= List of Mexican actresses =

This is an alphabetical list of notable Mexican Actresses.

== A ==
- Chantal Andere
- Jacqueline Andere
- Yolanda Andrade
- Yalitza Aparicio
- Angélica Aragón
- Lilia Aragón
- Aracely Arámbula
- Socorro Avelar

== B ==
- Nuria Bages
- Rocío Banquells
- Melissa Barrera
- Angelique Boyer
- Jacqueline Bracamontes
- Diana Bracho
- Erika Buenfil

== C ==
- Leticia Calderón
- Itatí Cantoral
- Irán Castillo
- Daniela Castro
- Martha Mariana Castro
- Verónica Castro
- Ana Colchero
- Ninel Conde
- Ana Brenda Contreras
- Claudia Alvarez Ocampo

== D ==
- Kate del Castillo
- Consuelo Duval

== E ==
- Kika Edgar
- Julieta Egurrola
- Ana Bertha Espín

== F ==
- Virginia Fábregas
- María Félix
- Laura Flores
- Adriana Fonseca

== G ==
- Bibi Gaytán
- Edith González
- Eiza González
- Susana González

== H ==
- Salma Hayek
- Lorena Herrera

== I ==
- Claudia Islas
- Giselle Itié

== J ==
- Altair Jarabo

== L ==
- Adriana Lavat
- Andrea Legarreta
- Laura Leon
- Olivia Leyva
- Karyme Lozano
- Lucero
- Lety López

== M ==
- Patricia Manterola
- Angelica Maria
- Ana Martín
- Lucía Méndez
- Galilea Montijo
- Lisette Morelos

== N ==
- Silvia Navarro
- Patricia Navidad
- Adriana Nieto
- Adela Noriega
- Nailea Norvind
- Renata Notni
- Lupita Nyong'o

== P ==
- Dominika Paleta
- Ludwika Paleta
- Leticia Palma
- Maite Perroni
- Silvia Pasquel
- Christina Pastor

== R ==
- Patricia Reyes Spíndola
- Angélica Rivera
- Lorena Rojas
- Ana Patricia Rojo
- Helena Rojo
- María Rojo
- Daniela Romo
- Victoria Ruffo

== S ==
- Susana Salazar
- Carmen Salinas
- Nora Salinas
- Blanca Sánchez
- Mariana Seoane
- Sherlyn
- Sofía Sisniega
- Stephanie Sigman
- Sasha Sokol
- María Sorté

== T ==
- Arleth Terán
- Thalía

== V ==
- Angelica Vale
- Zuria Vega
- Michelle Vieth
- Mayrín Villanueva
- Grettell Valdéz

== Z ==
- Laura Zapata
