= Roberto Tello =

Mexican actor, comedian and director (born 1969)

- Born: 27 January 1969 (age 57); Mexico City, Mexico
- Status: Active
- Other name: El Coreano
- Occupations: Actor, director
- Notable credit(s): Dos Mujeres, un Camino, Volver a Empezar

Roberto Tello (born 27 January 1969 in Mexico City, Mexico) is a Mexican actor, comedian and director. He is best known for his characterization of "El Coreano" ("The Korean one"), a character that he usually plays alongside Carlos Miguel Suarez, who plays "El Coreano"'s best friend, "Poncho". The pair has acted as "Poncho" and "Coreano" in such Televisa telenovelas as Volver a Empezar and Tú y Yo.

== Early life ==
Tello was born in Mexico City. As a young man, he studied acting at Televisa's CEA.

== Acting career ==
Tello featured in telenovelas such as Mi pequeña Soledad ("Little Soledad"), Muchachitas ("Young Girls") and Magica Juventud ("Magic Youth"), before landing the role that made him famous, as "El Coreano", in Volver a Empezar ("Starting Again"), in 1994. Volver a Empezar was a major hit in Mexico and internationally, giving Tello fame in other places, such as the United States and Peru.

Tello then acted in El premio mayor, ("The Big Price"), which was another major hit in Mexico, the United States and the rest of Latin America. His other credits include Dos Mujeres, un Camino ("Two Women, One Way"), Tú y Yo, La Piloto ("The Pilot") and La Piloto 2. In 2018, he was recognized by the Asociacion Nacional de Actores for his by-then 25-year career as an actor.

He played "Romuanldo Brayan Donovan" in the television comedy, Una Familia de 10 ("A Family of 10").

The actor has caused some controversy in Mexico for his theatrical run in which he plays a woman named "Queta Manon" (a name which in Spanish sounds like "how huge!"), a chubby lady.

== Hotel VIP ==
Tello participated in a television reality show named Hotel VIP, There was an incident in which he tried to help actress Manola DIez keep her balance during a competition and she responded by slapping him on the face. Diez complained to actor and show host Roberto Palazuelos about Tello's behavior towards her. Diez and Tello had some tense moments during the show, leading to the incident. Tello quit on September 5, 2023, and Diez was eventually eliminated out of the show on November 15 of the same year.

== Personal life ==
He is married to Gabriela Renata Cuevas. He has two children, including a daughter whom he was falsely accused of kidnapping in 2019.

Tello has shared friendships with several co-workers in real life, including Monica Dossetti and Carlos Miguel Suarez, both of whom acted alongside him in Volver a Empezar. He is seen frequently visiting Suarez at Suarez's taco stand.

== Health issues ==
In June 2020, Tello suffered a car accident when he was driving towards Mexico City on the Toluca to Mexico City highway. He and his passenger were taken to a hospital for observation and tests but were reportedly uninjured.

During 2022, Tello had a gastric bypass surgery performed, in order to lose some weight.

== See also ==
- List of Mexicans
