= Itatí Cantoral =

Mexican actress

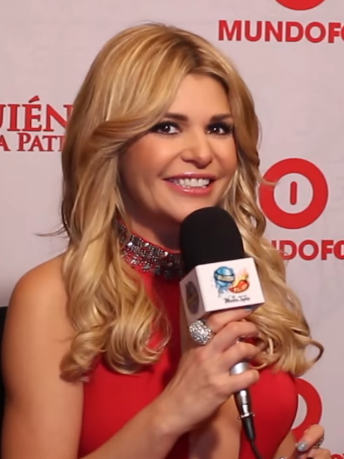
- Cantoral in February 2015
- Born: Itatí Cantoral Zucchi; May 13, 1975 (age 51); Mexico City, Mexico
- Occupations: Actress, singer, dancer, producer
- Years active: 1986–present
- Height: 1.60 m (5 ft 3 in)
- Spouses: Eduardo Santamarina (m. 1999; div. 2004) Carlos Cruz (m. 2008; div. 2017)
- Children: 3
- Father: Roberto Cantoral

Itatí Cantoral Zucchi (born May 13, 1975) is a Mexican actress, singer, dancer, and producer. She is best known for her roles as Soraya Montenegro in María la del Barrio (1995) and Alejandra Álvarez del Castillo Fernández "La Licenciada" in Hasta que el dinero nos separe (2009), both telenovelas produced by Televisa.

== Early life and education ==
Cantoral was born in Mexico City, Mexico. She is the daughter of Mexican composer and songwriter Roberto Cantoral, and Argentine actress of Italian descent, Itatí Zucchi. Cantoral has three brothers: Carlos, Roberto, and José Cantoral, who is also an actor and singer.

A child actress, Cantoral was accepted into the Televisa actors' academy, Centro de Educación Artística, at the age of 13. She made her television debut in the series La telaraña in 1986 and later appeared in the telenovela Muchachitas in 1991.

== Career ==
In 1993, Cantoral appeared in Dos mujeres, un camino with Erik Estrada, Laura León, Bibi Gaytán, Lorena Herrera, Selena Quintanilla, Jorge Salinas, and members of Grupo Bronco. This production exposed her to wider audiences in Mexico and Latin America. She took the role of the villain Soraya Montenegro in María la del Barrio from 1995 to 1996, alongside Thalía and Fernando Colunga. In 1996 and 1997 she appeared in Tú y yo, with Maribel Guardia and Joan Sebastian; and in Salud, dinero y amor, the sequel to Mexican telenovela El premio mayor.

In 2001, Cantoral played the antagonic role of Raquel Villavicencio in Sin Pecado Concebido, another Televisa production starring Angelica Rivera and Carlos Ponce. She starred in the Brazilian-American co-production Vale todo in 2002; and in 2003, Telemundo's El alma herida, as a teenage girl who crosses the Mexican–American border to find her long-lost mother. In 2004, she was Sally Bowles in Mexico City's Teatro Insurgentes production of Cabaret, and in 2006, she starred with Francisco Gattorno in the Telemundo production of Julio Jimenez's La Viuda de Blanco.

In 2009–2010, she played the character Alejandra Alvarez Del Castilo in Televisa's hit telenovela Hasta que el dinero nos separe with actor and singer Pedro Fernández, for which she won Best Actress at the Premios TVyNovelas, where the telenovela also won the main category; while the actors won Best Couple of the Year at the show.

Cantoral protagonized many famous plays in Mexican theatre, such as Aventurera, Sweet Charity, Mame the Musical and many more.

In 2018, she starred as Mexican actress Silvia Pinal in the biographical television series Silvia Pinal, Frente a Ti, for which she was nominated as Best Actress in a TV series for the Premios TVyNovelas.

On November 18, 2015, Cantoral was named Mr. Amigo, which is an association in Brownsville, Texas that honors a Mexican citizen each year to promote international friendship and good will between the U.S. and Mexico. Itatí is the second member of the Cantoral family to be awarded Mr. Amigo after her father, Roberto Cantoral, was awarded in 1981.

As a singer, Cantoral has released two albums, one of them being Itatí Canta a Roberto Cantoral, which was produced by her late father Roberto Cantoral. In 2018, she was part of the tribute album to her father "Roberto Cantoral: Siempre Vivo" with the song "Me Esta Gustando".

== Filmography ==
=== Film ===
Year	Title	Role	Notes
1996	Bonita	Bonita	
2002	De cuando el pescado murió de placer	Television conductor	Short film
2003	La hija del caníbal	Airline saleswoman	
2003	Ya no los hacen como antes	Perla	
2004	Man on Fire	Evelyn	Uncredited role
2006	Cansada de besar sapos	Cecilia	
2006	Los pajarracos	Fina	
2006	No hay derecho joven	Lawyer	
2007	One Long Night	Patty	
2009	Amar	Lisa	
2012	El Santos vs la Tetona Mendoza	La Lisiada Novela Actress	
2014	Amor de mis amores	Elva	
2014	La dictadura perfecta	Lucrecia Lascuráin	
2017	Sobre tus huellas	Horse Riding Instructor	
2019	No Manches Frida 2	Camila	
2022	My Mother-in-law Hates Me	Regina	
2022	Turning Red	Ming Lee	Dubbing role (Sandra Oh)

=== Television ===
Title	Year	Role	Notes
1986	La telaraña		
1991	Muchachitas	Lucía Aguilera	
1991	La pícara soñadora	Melissa	
1992	De frente al sol	Lupita	
1993	Dos mujeres, un camino	Graciela Torres Núñez	
1994–96	Mujer, casos de la vida real	Various roles	4 episodes
1994	Lo que se vio y no se vio de Dos mujeres, un camino	Graciela Torres Núñez	Archive footage, television film
1995	María la del Barrio	Soraya Montenegro	
1996	Tú y yo	Casandra	
1997	Salud, dinero y amor	Estrella Pérez	
1994	Derbez en cuando	Soraya Montenegro	Archive footage
1999	Cuento de Navidad	Sebring Cirrus	
1999	Infierno en el paraíso	Francesca Paoli Prado	
2001	Sin pecado concebido	Raquel Villavicencio Rojas	
2001	Amigas y rivales	Eduviges	
2002	Vale todo	Raquel	
2003	El alma herida	Eugenia Granados	
2006	La viuda de Blanco	Alicia Guardiola	
2008	Tiempo final	Silvia	Episode: "Mala noche"
2008	Mujeres asesinas	Sandra Arvide	Episode: "Sandra, trepadora"
2009–10	Hasta que el dinero nos separe	Alejandra Álvarez del Castillo	Main role; 231 episodes (season 1)
2011	El sexo débil	Helena Román	
2012	Capadocia	Leonor Cantú	Recurring role; 4 episodes (season 3)
2013	Fortuna	Comisionada Paloma Alarcón	
2015	¿Quién mató a Patricia Soler?	Sara Fernández / Isabel	
2015	Amores con trampa	Isabel	Main role; 128 episodes (season 1)
2016	El Vato	Wendy Lozada	9 episodes
2016–17	El Chema	Blanca	Main role; 79 episodes (season 1)
2018	José José, el príncipe de la canción	Natalia "Kiki" Herrera	Main role
2019	Silvia Pinal, frente a ti	Silvia Pinal	Main role
2019	Se rentan cuartos	Graciela Garza De La Garza y Más Garza	Main role
2020	La mexicana y el güero	Andrea Ibarrola Gil	Main Role
2022	Daddies on Request	Maricarmen	
2022	High Heat	Gloria	Main Role
2024	El Señor de los Cielos	Belén San Román / Blanca Lovato	Main role
2025	Velvet: El nuevo imperio	Isabel Juárez	

== Awards and nominations ==
=== TVyNovelas Awards ===
Year	Category	Telenovela	Result
1993	Best Young Lead Actress	De frente al Sol	Nominated
1994	Best Young Lead Actress	Dos mujeres, un camino	Nominated
1996	Best Female Antagonist	María la del Barrio	Won
2002	Best Female Antagonist	Sin pecado concebido	Won
2010	Best Lead Actress	Hasta que el dinero nos separe	Won
2020	Best Lead Actress in a Series	Silvia Pinal, Frente a ti	Won

=== Premios People en Español ===
Year	Category	Telenovela	Result
2010	Best Actress	Hasta que el dinero nos separe	Won
2010	Best Couple (with Pedro Fernandez)	Hasta que el dinero nos separe	Won

=== Festival Mercado TV-Fiction International Awards ===
Year	Category	Telenovela	Result
2011	Best Lead Actress	El Sexo Débil	Won

=== Association of Theatre Journalists Awards ===
Year	Category	Production	Result
2012	Best Lead Actress	Misery	Won

=== Other awards ===
- Medal Omecihuatl 2011 Awarded by Inmujeres DF
- Part of "Los 50 más bellos" by magazine People en Español (2011, 2015)
- Queen of Voceadores (2010)
- Queen of Veracruz television
- Premio Palmas de oro (Best Villain)
- Jealous of the popularity
- Premio Bravo
- Premio ACE of New York
- El Sol de oro
- Premio Fama New York (2002)
- Queen of Mariachi (2015)
- Mr. Amigo (Nov. 18, 2015)
