= Mágica juventud =

Mexican telenovela

- Genre: Telenovela
- Created by: Emilio Larrosa
- Written by: Verónica Suárez; Alejandro Pohlenz
- Directed by: Antonio Serrano; Alfredo Gurrola; José Ángel García
- Starring: Kate del Castillo; Héctor Soberón; Marisol Santacruz; Carmen Montejo; Sergio Sendel; Amairani; Gabriela Platas
- Opening theme: Mágica juventud by Lorena Tassinari
- Country of origin: Mexico
- Original language: Spanish
- No. of episodes: 110

Production
- Executive producer: Emilio Larrosa
- Production locations: Mexico City, Mexico
- Running time: 41-44 minutes
- Production company: Televisa

Original release
- Network: Canal de las Estrellas
- Release: November 30, 1992 – April 30, 1993

Related
- Las secretas intenciones; Los Parientes Pobres

Mágica juventud (English title: Magic youth) is a Mexican telenovela produced by Emilio Larrosa for Televisa in 1992.

Kate del Castillo and Héctor Soberón starred as protagonists, while Sergio Sendel, Amairani and Marisol Santacruz starred as antagonists. Gabriela Platas starred as young antagonist. Raymundo Capetillo and Gilberto Román starred as adult antagonists. Carmen Montejo starred as stellar performance.

== Plot ==
Miguel is a young man working in a zoo. He has a dark secret: a few years ago, he was part of a criminal gang, which was captured. Miguel went to jail, but far from being reformed after serving his sentence he has become aggressive and resentful against society.

One day assists the restaurant called "La Hamburguesa Mágica" very popular among young people served by Pepita, friendly old woman who is a friend of all. There he meets Fernanda, a cute young cheerful and kind, and both fall in love.

Miguel believes he has finally found the love he was missing and intends to change his behavior. Fernanda begins investigating his past, which causes Miguel to return to his former behavior and distance himself from her. He later realizes how much he loves Fernanda and tries to reconcile with her, but Leonardo Grimaldi, also pursues her and interferes with their relationship.

== Cast ==
- Kate del Castillo as Fernanda Gutiérrez Mercedes
- Héctor Soberón as Miguel Hernández Sarmiento
- Marisol Santacruz as Patricia Grimaldi Retana
- Carmen Montejo as Leonor Jiménez Vda. de Retana/Pepita
- Sergio Sendel as Leonardo Grimaldi Retana
- Amairani as Consuelo Gutiérrez
- Gabriela Platas as Brenda del Conde Sierra
- Raymundo Capetillo as Ernesto Grimaldi Ornelas
- Gilberto Román as Gonzalo Zapata
- Karen Sentíes as Laura Alonso Suárez
- Carlos Cámara as Ezequiel Morales López
- María Montejo as Carmen Mercedes de Gutiérrez
- Roberto Sen as Eusebio Gutiérrez Maldonado
- Manuel Saval as Javier Cuartas Toledo
- Hilda Aguirre as Clara Aguirre Fernández
- Tina Romero as Silvia Aguirre Fernández
- Sussan Taunton as Claudia Roldán Martínez
- Ramón Abascal as Gerardo Núñez García
- Jorge Salinas as Héctor Rueda Montoya
- Raúl Alberto as Alejandro Zapata Martín
- Claudia Silva as Merlina Sán Miguel Sinisterra
- Mauricio Islas as Alfredo Camacho Talavera
- Vanessa Villela as Alicia Talamonti Cuadrado
- Roberto Palazuelos as himself
- Antonio Miguel as Don Cástulo
- Raquel Morell as Eleonor Retana Jiménez
- José Ángel García as Víctor
- Radamés de Jesús as Carlos
- Alejandra Morales as Yolanda
- Óscar Vallejo as Chucho
- Magaly as Odette
- Raúl Magaña as Miguel
- Roberto Ruy as Rosálio
- Pedro Romo as Pedro
- Pablo Ferrel as Pablo
- Paco Ibáñez as Paco
- Carlos Miguel as Ricardo
- José Antonio Iturriaga as César
- Adriana Lavat
- Juan Carlos Casasola
- Vilma Traca
- Karla Ganem
- Roberto Tello
- Michelle Vieth
