= Salud, dinero y amor =

Mexican telenovela

- Genre: Telenovela; Romance; Drama
- Created by: Emilio Larrosa
- Written by: Alejandro Pohlenz; Saúl Pérez Santana
- Directed by: Salvador Garcini; Alfredo Tappan; José Ángel García
- Starring: Itatí Cantoral; Eduardo Santamarina; Carlos Bonavide; Frances Ondiviela; Sergio Kleiner
- Opening theme: Salud, dinero y amor by Lorena Tassinari; Salud, dinero y amor by Itatí Cantoral & Carlos Bonavides
- Country of origin: Mexico
- Original language: Spanish
- No. of episodes: 110 (Original version); 92 (International version)

Production
- Executive producer: Emilio Larrosa
- Production locations: Filming; Televisa San Ángel; Mexico City, Mexico; Locations; Mexico City, Mexico
- Running time: 41-44 minutes (episodes 1-75); 21-22 minutes (episodes 76-110)
- Production company: Televisa

Original release
- Network: Canal de las Estrellas
- Release: August 4, 1997 – January 2, 1998

Related
- El premio mayor (1995)

Salud, dinero y amor (English title: Health, Money and Love) is a Mexican telenovela produced by Emilio Larrosa for Televisa in Mexico, which serves as a sequel of 1995 Mexican telenovela El premio mayor.

In Mexico, Canal de las Estrellas broadcast the entire series from August 4, 1997, replacing Pueblo chico, infierno grande until January 2, 1998 when Volver a empezar replaces it, as the former would be later cancelled.

Carlos Bonavides, Itatí Cantoral and Eduardo Santamarina starred as protagonists, while Frances Ondiviela, Martha Julia, Maribel Fernández, Héctor Suárez Gomis, Laura Forastieri and Sergio Klainer starred as antagonists. Mónica Dossetti, Arath de la Torre and Dinorah Cavazos starred as stellar performances.

== Cast ==
- Itatí Cantoral as Estrella Pérez Jiménez
- Eduardo Santamarina as Dr. Jorge Miguel Fontanot
- Carlos Bonavides as Luis "Huicho" Domínguez López
- Frances Ondiviela as Adriana Rivas Cacho de Fontanot
- Sergio Kleiner as Dr. Damián Zárate
- Maribel Fernández as Celia "La Condesa" Jiménez Viuda de Pérez
- Martha Julia as Consuelo Flores de Domínguez/de Zárate
- Mónica Dossetti as Karla Greta Reyes Retana y de las Altas Torres
- Héctor Suárez Gomis as El Tacubayo
- Arath de la Torre as Francisco José "Pancho" Martínez
- Laura Forastieri as Dalilah
- Dinorah Cavazos as Leticia "La China" Martínez
- Leonor Llausás as Doña Anita López de Domínguez
- Óscar Vallejo as Enrique "Quique" Domínguez Molina
- Sergio DeFassio as Cosme Gutiérrez
- Bobby Larios as Sebastián
- Ricardo Silva as Agustín Villagrán
- Alfonso Mier y Terán as Tobi Reyes Retana y de las Altas Torres
- Magdalena Cabrera as Fulgencia Pérez
- Claudia Vega as Mercedes/Edwina
- Alberto Mayagoitia as Federico Montiel
- Guillermo García Cantú as Felipe
- Kitty de Hoyos as María Cristina de Montiel
- Gustavo Rojo as Don Federico Montiel
- Tania Prado as Malena Sánchez
- Sharis Cid as Lidia Rivas Cacho
- Anghel as Etelvina
- José Luis Rojas as Hipólito "Cachito"
- Samuel Gallegos as El Darvader
- José María Calvario as El Cacahuate
- Paola Flores as Rufina
- Radamés de Jesús as Giorgio
- Consuelo Duval as Carolina
- Alea Yolotl as Juventina
- Gabriela Arroyo as Reina Sánchez de Reyes Retana
- Irina Areu as Tracy Smith
- Antonio Escobar as Rodrigo
- Fernando Manzano as El Hidráulico
- Rodolfo de Alejandre as Pollo
- Sylvia Valdés as Ruperta
- José Antonio Iturriaga as Nemesio
- Arturo Muñoz as Pedro
- Miguel Serros as Tony
- Nelly Horsman as Jorge Miguel's mother
- Manola Diez as Lorena
- Joana Brito as Mother Superior
- Sheyla as Sister Dominga
- Marichelo as Sister Inés
- Monica Riestra as Secretary agency underwear
- Julio Mannino as Ricardo
- Enrique Hidalgo as Doctor Cabrera
- Andrea Torre as Adriana Rivas Cacho (teenager)
- Rubén Morales as Adriana's father
- Odemaris Ruiz as Estrella Pérez (child)
- Genoveva Pérez as Refugio
- Polo Salazar as Cobarrubias
- Perla Jasso as Claudia
- Juan Ángel Esparza as Eugenio
- Adriana Rojo as Social worker
- Eduardo Cuervo as Daniel
- Jacqueline Arroyo as Huicho's lover
- Mayra Murrieta as Esperanza
- Ingrid Martz as Ingrid Sandoval
- Ivonne Montero as Ivonne Sanchéz

== Awards ==
Year	Award	Category	Nominee	Result
1998	16th TVyNovelas Awards	Best Antagonist Actor	Héctor Suárez Gomís	Won
