= Infierno en el paraíso =

Mexican telenovela

- Genre: Telenovela
- Created by: Nora Alemán
- Written by: Nora Alemán; Nora Sánchez; Alejandra León de la Barra; Martín Támez
- Directed by: Sergio Cataño; Mario Mandujano
- Starring: Juan Ferrara; Diana Bracho; Alicia Machado; Héctor Suárez Gomis; Magda Guzmán; Rosa María Bianchi; Julio Bracho; Sergio Corona; Arsenio Campos; Julieta Rosen
- Opening theme: Si he sabido amor by Alejandro Fernández
- Country of origin: Mexico
- Original language: Spanish
- No. of episodes: 90

Production
- Executive producer: Carlos Sotomayor
- Producer: Rafael Urióstegui
- Production locations: Filming; Televisa San Ángel; Mexico City, Mexico
- Cinematography: Armando Zafra; Aurelio García
- Running time: 41-44 minutes
- Production company: Televisa

Original release
- Network: Canal de las Estrellas
- Release: June 21 – October 22, 1999

Infierno en el paraíso (English title: Hell in Paradise) is a Mexican telenovela produced by Carlos Sotomayor for Televisa in 1999.

It stars Juan Ferrara, Diana Bracho, Alicia Machado, Héctor Suárez Gomis, Magda Guzmán Rosa María Bianchi, Julio Bracho, Sergio Corona, Arsenio Campos and Julieta Rosen.

== Cast ==
=== Main ===
- Juan Ferrara as Alejandro Valdivia
- Diana Bracho as Dariana Valdivia
- Alicia Machado as Marián Ordiales
- Héctor Suárez Gomis as Ricardo Selma
- Magda Guzmán as Fernanda "Nanda" Viuda de Prego
- Rosa María Bianchi as Dolores Almada de Fernández
- Julio Bracho as Antonio Valdivia
- Sergio Corona as Father Juan
- Arsenio Campos as Santiago
- Julieta Rosen as Fernanda Prego de Valdivia

=== Recurring ===
- Aurora Molina as Herminia
- Arturo Laphan as Fermín
- Sharis Cid as Claudia
- Consuelo Mendiola as Beti
- Israel Jaitovich as Gerardo
- Sebastián Moncayo as Eduardo
- Paco Ibáñez as Federico Ordiales
- Amparo Garrido as Amparo
- Marco Uriel as Dr. Lapuente
- Rafael del Villar as Lawyer Villanueva
- Mariana Sánchez as Lucina
- Manola Díez as Azela
- Alejandro Ávila as Felipe
- Martha Aline as Cecilia
- Roxana Castellanos as Janet
- Archie Lafranco as Paul
- Tony Bravo as Javier
- Sylvia Derbez as Angélica Viuda de Clemente

=== Guest star ===
- Itatí Cantoral as Francesca Paoli Prado

== Awards ==
Year	Award	Category	Nominee	Result
2000	Bravo Awards	Best Antagonist Actress	Diana Bracho	Won
