= Muchachitas como tú =

- Genre: Telenovela
- Created by: Emilio Larrosa; Verónica Suárez; Alejandro Pohlenz
- Based on: Muchachitas by Emilio Larrosa
- Written by: Verónica Suárez; Ricardo Barona; Emilio Larrosa; Ramón Larrosa; Saúl Pérez Santana; Lorena Medina
- Directed by: José Ángel García; Claudio Reyes Rubio; Víctor Manuel Fouilloux
- Starring: Ariadne Díaz; Gloria Sierra; Gabriela Carrillo; Begoña Narváez
- Opening theme: "Muchachitas" by Belinda; "Vuelen alto" by Ariadne Díaz, Gabriela Carrillo, Begoña Narváez and Gloria Sierra
- Ending theme: "El amarre" by Laura León
- Composer: Yesou Godinez
- Country of origin: Mexico
- Original language: Spanish
- No. of episodes: 145

Production
- Executive producer: Emilio Larrosa
- Producer: Arturo Pedraza Loera
- Production locations: Televisa San Ángel; Mexico City, Mexico
- Cinematography: Gerardo Gómez Lapena; Luis Monroy
- Camera setup: Multi-camera
- Running time: 41-44 minutes
- Production company: Televisa

Original release
- Network: Canal de las Estrellas
- Release: April 23 – November 9, 2007

Muchachitas como tú (English title: Young Girls Like You) is a teen Mexican telenovela produced by Emilio Larrosa for Televisa in 2007. It is an adaption of the Mexican telenovela Muchachitas, also produced by Emilio Larrosa. It premiered on April 23, 2007, and ended on November 9, 2007.

This telenovela tells the story of four girls: Elena Olivares, Isabel Flores, Leticia Hernández and Monica Sánchez Zuñiga. The villain is Federico Cantú, a psycho killer who will stop at nothing until he gets Guillermo's fortune (Monica's dad). Muchachitas como tú, although being strongly criticized in Mexico, was a great success; in its final episodes it was the most watched telenovela in Mexico, surpassing Pasión, the most watched telenovela in Mexico at that time.

Ariadne Díaz, Begoña Narváez, Gabriela Carrillo and Gloria Sierra starred as protagonists, while Fabián Robles, Silvia Mariscal, Angelique Boyer, Carlos Cámara Jr., Claudia Troyo, Jorge de Silva and Manuela Imaz starred as antagonists.

The main theme song was performed by Spanish singer Belinda.

== Plot ==
Elena, Isabel, Mónica and Leticia are four girls who meet at an acting school (TAES).They belong to different social classes, but for them it is not important, because their main value is friendship. Monica's mother and Elena's father have a past and it turns out that Elena and Monica are half-sisters. Federico Cantú (Fabián Robles) is Monica's cousin, he has been working for Guillermo, his uncle, who trusts him even though Federico's only interest is stealing his uncle's money. Lety lies about her financial status and pretends to be wealthy.

== Cast ==
=== Main ===
- Laura León as Carmen Márquez de Barbosa

The Muchachitas

- Ariadne Díaz as Leticia Hernández Fernández/Herfer
- Begoña Narváez as Isabel Flores
- Gabriela Carrillo as Elena Olivares
- Gloria Sierra as Mónica Sánchez-Zúñiga Vásquez

The Muchachitos

- Marco Méndez as Joaquín Barbosa
- José Ron as Jorge
- Mike Biaggio as Rodrigo Suárez
- Mauricio Barcelata as Roger Guzmán
- Arturo Carmona as Diego Velázquez

Villains of "Muchachitas"

- Claudia Troyo as Lucy Montenegro
- Fabian Robles as Federico Cantú Sánchez-Zúñiga
- Elizabeth Aguilar as Virginia Vélez
- Mar Contreras as Lorena
- Karla Luna as Gabriela
- Thelma Dorantes as Lucia
- Manuela Ímaz as Raquel Ortigosa
- Eduardo Liñán as El Diablo
- Silvia Mariscal as Martha Sánchez-Zúñiga
- Mariana Morones as Renata
- Raúl Ochoa as Abel
- Jorge da Silva as Valente Quintanar
- Oscar Traven as Felipe Montenegro

=== Supporting ===
- Angelique Boyer as Margarita Villaseñor
- Erika Garcia as Mariana
- Tania Ibañez as Natalia
- Lucero Lander as Esperanza Fernández
- Ricardo Barona as Francisco "Pancho" Hernández
- Maria Isabel Benet as Leonor Santos
- Sergio Reynoso as Alfredo Palacios Flores
- Dulce as Esther Cervantes #1
- Socorro Bonilla as Esther Cervantes #2
- Carlos Camara Jr. as Jose "Pepe" Olivares
- Cecilia Gabriela as Verónica Vázquez
- Roberto Blandón as Guillermo Sánchez-Zúñiga
- Carlos Bracho as Bernardo Barbosa
- Lalo "El Mimo" as Héctor Suárez
- Yaxkin Santa Lucia as Rolando
- Ramon Valdes as Raúl
- Lorena de la Garza as Laura
- Dylan Obed as Claudio
- Hugo Aceves as Tolomeo
- Lucia Zerecero as Mercedes
- Fernanda Ruizos as Dra. Gwendolin
- Lorena Velázquez as Teresa Linares
- Danna Paola as Paola Velásquez
- Alfredo Alfonso as Comandante Rubio
- Mario Casillas as Luis Villaseñor
- Silvia Manríquez as Constanza de Villaseñor
- Paulina Martell as Silvia Hernández Fernández
- Ricardo Silva as Lic. Julio César
- Zoila Quiñones as Professor Custodia Zamarripa
- Mario Sauret as Professor Timoteo
- David Rencoret as Dr. Jacobo
- Marina Marín as Trinidad "Trini"

=== Special guests ===
- Maribel Guardia as herself
- Lorena Enriquez as herself
- Angélica María as herself
- Eduardo de la Garza Castro as himself
- Místico as himself
- Jacqueline Voltaire as Fashion Hostess
- Jesus More as TV Producer
- Victor Jiménez as Judge
- Gabriel Roustand as Police
- Adriano Zendejas as Patricio

== Original cast returns for special appearances ==
For this version, Laura León, best known as La Tia Carmen, returns to Televisa. Producer Emilio Larrosa and his team wrote a special character for her. This new character will guide the Muchachitas through their troubles. Laura León originally played Esther in the original version of Muchachitas.

The actor who portrays Pancho (Leticia's father) on the current version of the show acted as Abel Federico's assistant on the previous Muchachitas.

== Music group ==
At the end of this telenovela, the four Muchachitas will form a group and record an album.

== Awards ==
Year	Award	Category	Nominee	Result
2008	26th TVyNovelas Awards	Best Antagonist Actor	Fabián Robles	Nominated
2008	26th TVyNovelas Awards	Best Leading Actress	Silvia Mariscal	Nominated
2008	26th TVyNovelas Awards	Best Female Revelation	Ariadne Díaz	Nominated
2008	26th TVyNovelas Awards	Best Female Revelation	Gloria Sierra	Nominated
2008	26th TVyNovelas Awards	Best Child Performance	Danna Paola	Nominated
