= Palazuelos =

Palazuelos may refer to:

== People ==
- Palazuelos (surname)

== Places ==
- Palazuelos, Guadalajara, village in Guadalajara, Spain
- Palazuelos de Muñó, municipality in Burgos, Castile and León, Spain
- Palazuelos de Eresma, village in Segovia, Castile and León, Spain
- Palazuelos de la Sierra, municipality in Burgos, Castile and León, Spain
