= Maribel Fernández =

Mexican actress

Maribel Fernández (born 9 March 1953 in Mexico City, Mexico) is a Mexican television and film actress, also known in some works as La Pelangocha.

== Career ==
Maribel Fernández has worked in many Mexican films and telenovelas. She also worked with Chespirito, playing one of the versions of the character "Gloria" in El Chavo del Ocho, the others being portrayed by Olivia Leyva in 1975, Regina Torné in 1978, and Maricarmen Vela in 1987.

== Filmography ==
=== Films ===
Year	Title	Role	Notes
1971	Los campeones justicieros	Miss Jalisco	
1971	Papá en onda		
1971	Los Beverly de Peralvillo	Paty, esposa de Paco	
1972	Mecánica nacional	Young girl in the group	
1973	¡Qué familia tan cotorra!	Paty, esposa de Paco	
1974	Presagio		
1974	Negro es un bello color		
1977	El moro de Cumpas		
2022	Cuando sea mas Joven		

=== Television ===
Year	Title	Role	Notes
1972	El Chapulín Colorado	Esposa	Uncredited "La fuga/El museo/El ladrón de comida" (Season 1, Episode 3)
1972-1974	El Chavo del Ocho	Gloria	Uncredited: "Gloria llega a la vecindad" (Season 1, Episode 4); "Gloria y Patty" (Season 1, Episode 5); "Everything Has an End" (Season 1, Episode 450)
1974	Mundo de juguete	Secretaria	
1975	Mi secretaria		
1980	Querer volar	Bárbara	TV mini-series
1980	No temas al amor	Alicia	
1981	Extraños caminos del amor	Alicia	
1993	Los parientes pobres	Amalia de Zavala	
1994	Hasta que la muerte los separe	Elisa	11 episodes
1994	La risa en vacaciones 5	Maribel	Television film
1995	La risa en vacaciones 6	Maribel	Television film
1996	Tú y yo	Doña Chela	
1997	Salud, dinero y amor	La Condesa	
1998	¿Qué nos pasa?		6 episodes
1999-2000	Mujeres engañadas	Concepción	4 episodes
2000-2003	Mujer, casos de la vida real	Various roles	10 episodes
2002	Cómplices al rescate	Macrina Bautista	
2003	De pocas, pocas pulgas	Gladys	
2004	Amar otra vez	Lucía "Lucy" Vidal	
2004	La Jaula	Doña Paquita	Episode: "Los Big Tacos"
2004	Misión S.O.S. aventura y amor	Ángeles	
2005	Estudio 2	Gladys	4 episodes
2005	Los perplejos	Herself	"Veintiuno" (Season 1, Episode 21)
2006-2007	La fea más bella	Martha de Hurtado de Muñoz	
2007	Tormenta en el paraíso	Carmelita	
2008	Querida enemiga	Olga	
2011-2012	Dos hogares	Enriqueta "Queta" Pérez	144 episodes
2011-2014	Como dice el dicho	Yolanda	"Ora veraz huarache" (Season 1, Episode 4); "Más vale feo" (Season 2, Episode 52); "Pies para qué los quiero" (Season 4, Episode 52)
2013	Corazón indomable	Dominga	"Maricruz al reclusorio" (Season 1, Episode 149); "Carola ataca de nuevo" (Season 1, Episode 150); "Pelea en la cárcel" (Season 1, Episode 151); "José Antonio inválido" (Season 1, Episode 152); "Maricruz es aislada" (Season 1, Episode 153); "Anibal muere" (Season 1, Episode 154)
2015	Amores con trampa	Conchita	
2022	Tal para cual	Nacorita	
