= Pedro Romo (actor) =

Mexican actor and comedian

Pedro Romo (born 17 June 1957) is a Mexican actor and comedian. He is known mostly for his roles as Don Filemon in the sitcom Skimo, and Pedro in the La risa en vacaciones film series.

== Filmography ==
Year	Film	Role	Notes
1989	Placeres Divertidos		
1990	Deliciosa Sinvergüenza	Agent 42	
1990	Goza Conmigo		
1990	La Risa en Vacaciones	Pedro	
1990	La Risa en Vacaciones 2	Pedro	TV movie
1991	Verano peligroso	Hotel receptionist	
1992	Soy Libre		
1992	La Risa en Vacaciones 3	Pedro	TV movie
1993	Me Muero de la Risa		
1993	Dónde Quedó la Bolita		
1994	La Risa en Vacaciones 4	Pedro	TV movie
1994	La Risa en Vacaciones 5	Pedro	TV movie
1994	Me Permites Matarte?	Calavera	
1994	Chilindrina en Apuros	Don Coglione	
1995	La Risa en Vacaciones 6	Pedro	TV movie
1996	La Buenota Risa		
1996	La Risa en Vacaciones 7	Pedro	TV movie
1997	La Crisis me da Risa		
2000	Recompensa		
2000	Secretarias Privadísimas		TV movie
2000	Cuando Calienta El Sol		
2006	¡Qué Rica la Risa!		

== Television work ==
Romo has starred and guest starred in many sitcoms such as Skimo, Vecinos and Yo amo a Juan Querendón, and dramas such as Abrázame muy fuerte and Por tu Amor just to name a few.
