= Claudio Báez =

Mexican actor

- Born: 23 March 1948; Guadalajara, Mexico
- Died: 19 November 2017 (aged 69); Cuernavaca, Morelos, Mexico
- Occupation: Actor
- Years active: 1983–2017

Claudio Báez (23 March 1948 – 19 November 2017) was a Mexican television actor. He is best known for his work in Televisa telenovelas.

== Filmography ==
=== Television ===
Year	Title	Role	Notes
1983	Cuando los hijos se van	Jorge	
1984	Los años felices	Gabriel	
1984	Guadalupe	Unknown role	
1985	Vivir un poco	Armando Larrea	
1986	Martín Garatuza	Pedro Mejía	
1987–88	Rosa Salvaje	Federico Robles	8 episodes
1989	Mi segunda madre	Gerardo	
1989	Lo blanco y lo negro	Unknown role	
1989	Simplemente María	Gustavo del Villar	
1990	En carne propia	Padre Gerardo Servet	
1991	Sweating Bullets	Unknown role	Episode: "Forget Me Not"
1991–2005	Mujer, casos de la vida real	Efraín	12 episodes
1992	Carrusel de las Américas	Unknown role	
1993	Dos mujeres, un camino	Enrique Vidal	
1995	El premio mayor	Sergio	
1996	Tú y yo	Roberto Álvarez Albarrán	
1997	El secreto de Alejandra	Édgar	
1998–99	El privilegio de amar	Cristóbal	69 episodes
1999	Por tu amor	Luciano Higueras	
1999	Nunca te olvidaré	Comandante Patiño	
2001	Mujer bonita	Somoza	10 episodes
2001	La intrusa	Alirio Roldán	
2003	Bajo la misma piel	Ramón Gutiérrez	
2004	Mujer de madera	Benjamín Gómez	
2006–07	Mundo de fieras	Federico Velásquez	66 episodes
2007	Amor sin maquillaje	Unknown role	
2007–08	Al diablo con los guapos	Francois	
2008	La rosa de Guadalupe	Lorenzo	Episode: "Una luz de esperanza"
2009	Mi pecado	Luciano Ordorica	2 episodes
2010	Locas de amor	Ingeniero	25 episodes
2010	Soy tu dueña	Óscar Ampúdia	24 episodes
2011	Como dice el dicho	Unknown role	Episode: "Diablo te hiciste..."
2012	Un refugio para el amor	Lastra	64 episodes
2013	Gossip Girl: Acapulco	Eugenio Ruíz De Hinojosa	2 episodes
2014	La Gata	Ernesto	3 episodes
2014–15	Muchacha italiana viene a casarse	Máximo	13 episodes
2016	Despertar contigo	Coronel	9 episodes
