= Palazuelos (surname) =

Palazuelos is a Spanish surname. Notable people with the surname include:

- Roberto Palazuelos (born 1967), Mexican actor, model, and producer
- Rubén Palazuelos (born 1983), Spanish footballer
- Susana Palazuelos (born c. 1935), Mexican chef and businesswoman

== See also ==
- Pablo Palazuelo (1916–2007), Spanish painter and sculptor
