= Hotel VIP =

- Genre: Reality competition
- Based on: El hotel de los famosos
- Presented by: Roberto Palazuelos; Karina Banda
- Country of origin: Mexico
- Original language: Spanish
- No. of seasons: 1
- No. of episodes: 45

Production
- Executive producers: Diego Guebel; Yordi Rosado; Manolo Fernández
- Producer: Mario Ruiz de Chávez
- Production companies: TelevisaUnivision; Boxfish TV

Original release
- Network: Canal 5
- Release: 16 August – 1 November 2023

Hotel VIP is a Mexican reality competition television series that premiered on Canal 5 on 16 August 2023. It is an adaptation of the Argentine series El hotel de los famosos. The series follows a group of celebrities living together in a hotel competing for the cash grand prize. It is presented by Roberto Palazuelos and Karina Banda.

== Format ==
Sixteen celebrities are selected to spend a vacation at the Hotel VIP. However, the hotel has no employees, so the celebrities will face challenges that determine their status. Those who win the challenges will be the VIP members of the hotel and can enjoy all the comforts and luxuries, while those who fail will be the staff members of the hotel and must take care of the chores. At the end of each week, an elimination duel will be held to determine who leaves the hotel.

== Celebrities ==
Celebrity	Notability	Status	Ref.
Luis "Jawy" Méndez	Reality TV star	Winner on November 1, 2023	
Tefi Valenzuela	Model / singer	Runner-up on November 1, 2023	
Ligia Uriarte	Actress	3rd place on November 1, 2023	
Nicolás Vallejo-Nágera "Colate"	Entrepreneur	Eliminated on October 31, 2023	
Pee Wee	Singer	Eliminated on October 30, 2023	
Silverio Rocchi	Association football player	Eliminated on October 30, 2023	
Araceli Ordaz "Gomita"	Influencer / TV host	Eliminated on October 26, 2023	
Fer Sagreeb	TV host	Eliminated on October 24, 2023	
Jorge "Burro" Van Rankin	Actor / TV host	Eliminated on October 16, 2023	
Martha Figueroa	Journalist / TV host	Eliminated on October 16, 2023	
Vielka Valenzuela	TV host	Eliminated on October 5, 2023	
Manola Díez	Actress	Eliminated on September 25, 2023	
Carlos López "El Chevo"	Comedian	Eliminated on September 14, 2023	
Natália Subtil	Actress / singer	Eliminated on September 6, 2023	
Roberto Tello	Actor	Quit on September 5, 2023	
Christian Estrada	Reality TV star	Eliminated on August 29, 2023	
Mariana Ávila	Actress	Eliminated on August 22, 2023	

== Production ==
Filming of the series took place in Argentina from January to April 2023.

== Episodes ==
No.	Title	Original release date	Mexico viewers (millions)
1	"Desafío de equipos entre Staff y Huéspedes"	16 August 2023	0.93
2	"Manola Diez se enfrenta a Gomita y la hace llorar"	17 August 2023	0.81
3	"Christian Estrada y Tefi Valenzuela desatan fuertes sospechas de romance"	18 August 2023	0.72
4	"Manola Diez acusó a Roberto Tello de haberla golpeado durante fuerte pelea"	21 August 2023	0.70
5	"Tras una feroz competencia, Mariana Ávila deja el Hotel VIP"	22 August 2023	0.76
6	"La mala suerte persigue a Manola y le cae un estante encima"	23 August 2023	0.92
7	"Christian Estrada y Tefi Valenzuela se entregan a la pasión con un beso"	24 August 2023	0.65
8	"Manola Diez y Fer Sagreeb celebran su boda en el Hotel VIP"	25 August 2023	0.58
9	"Ligia y Silverio viven su primera cena romántica"	28 August 2023	0.57
10	"Christian Estrada se enfrenta a Tefi Valenzuela y sale del Hotel VIP"	29 August 2023	0.77
11	"Debido a una lesión, el Burro deja el Hotel VIP"	30 August 2023	0.78
12	"El Hotel VIP se engalana con la visita de Cristian Castro"	31 August 2023	0.71
13	"Gomita comparte su historia de supervivencia de violencia familiar"	4 September 2023	0.71
14	"Roberto Tello abandona la competencia"	5 September 2023	0.68
15	"Natália Subtil no participa en el Duelo de la H y es la tercera eliminada de Hotel VIP"	6 September 2023	0.58
16	"Carlos Ponce llegó al Hotel VIP para sorprender a Karina Banda"	7 September 2023	0.62
17	"Huéspedes y staff disfrutan de una fiesta para relajarse"	11 September 2023	0.61
18	"Ligia Uriarte se siente traicionada por Fer y su equipo peligra"	12 September 2023	0.58
19	"Gomita recibe un fuerte comentario anónimo sobre su cuerpo"	13 September 2023	0.52
20	"Chevo es eliminado en el Hotel VIP tras un reñido Duelo de la H"	14 September 2023	0.55
21	"Gomita es la primera en entrar a la Zona de Riesgo por mayoría de votos"	18 September 2023	0.42
22	"Ligia Uriarte le reclama a Manola Diez que dejó a la Mafia"	19 September 2023	0.41
23	"Jawy Méndez es el nuevo integrante del Hotel VIP"	20 September 2023	0.46
24	"El amor entre Silverio Rocchi y Ligia Uriarte en la cuerda floja"	21 September 2023	0.43
25	"Manola Diez y Martha Figueroa se enfrentan a la eliminación"	25 September 2023	0.47
26	"Silverio Rocchi protagoniza fuertes discusiones con Tefi y Vielka Valenzuela"	26 September 2023	0.54
27	"Silverio Rocchi y Ligia Uriarte están a un paso de la reconciliación"	27 September 2023	0.46
28	"Ligia Uriarte enfrentó por primera vez el Laberinto del Hotel VIP"	28 September 2023	0.53
29	"Vielka Valenzuela, la primera duelista, planea cambiar de bando"	2 October 2023	0.52
30	"Vielka Valenzuela se enfrenta a Fer Sagreeb en el Duelo de la H"	5 October 2023	0.49
31	"El regreso del Burro Van Rankin pone de cabeza al hotel"	9 October 2023	0.45
32	"Ligia Uriarte casi se queda sin aliados dentro del Hotel VIP"	10 October 2023	0.51
33	"El acercamiento entre Ligia y Jawy pone tensos a los demás"	11 October 2023	0.50
34	"Yordi Rosado llega al hotel como invitado especial"	12 October 2023	0.57
35	"Por primera vez hubo dos eliminados en Hotel VIP"	16 October 2023	0.40
36	"Pee Wee y Gomita revelan duras historias de su niñez"	17 October 2023	0.49
37	"Silverio le da un beso a Gomita"	18 October 2023	0.60
38	"Ante el rechazo de Silverio, Ligia se refugia en Jawy"	19 October 2023	0.38
39	"El Todos contra Todos se volvió una guerra contra Silverio"	23 October 2023	0.55
40	"Fer Sagreeb y Silverio Rocchi se enfrentan en el Duelo de la H"	24 October 2023	0.50
41	"Una votación diferente"	25 October 2023	0.49
42	"Desafío"	26 October 2023	N/A
43	"Laberinto"	30 October 2023	0.41
44	"Cerca de la final"	31 October 2023	0.49
45	"Final de impacto"	1 November 2023	0.48

== Ratings ==
Viewership and ratings per season of Hotel VIP
Season	Timeslot (CT)	Episodes	First aired		Last aired		Avg. viewers (millions)
Season	Timeslot (CT)	Episodes	Date	Viewers (millions)	Date	Viewers (millions)	Avg. viewers (millions)
1	Mon–Fri 8:00 p.m. (1–20); Mon–Thurs 10:00 p.m. (21–45)	44	16 August 2023	0.93	1 November 2023	0.48	0.57
