= Volver a Empezar (TV series) =

Mexican telenovela

- Genre: Telenovela; Romance; Drama
- Created by: Emilio Larrosa
- Written by: Verónica Suárez; Alejandro Pohlenz
- Directed by: Salvador Garcini; José Ángel García
- Starring: Yuri; Chayanne
- Opening theme: Volver a Empezar by Yuri; Atado a tu amor by Chayanne
- Country of origin: Mexico
- Original language: Spanish
- No. of episodes: 145

Production
- Executive producer: Emilio Larrosa
- Running time: 41-44 minutes
- Production company: Televisa

Original release
- Network: Canal de las Estrellas
- Release: July 25, 1994 – February 10, 1995

Related
- Prisionera de amor; María José

Volver a Empezar (English title: Starting Again) is a Mexican telenovela produced by Emilio Larrosa for Televisa in 1994–95. It originally released on the Mexican television network Canal de las Estrellas.

Yuri and Chayanne starred as protagonists, while Rafael Sánchez Navarro and Claudia Silva starred as antagonists.

== Plot ==
The telenovela revolves around the story of Mexican diva Renata or "Reny" and Puerto Rican singing legend Chayanne. Other significant characters include Lalo, Tony, Sandra, Poncho and Jessica. Reny is a 26-year-old whose father leaves her a fortune upon dying. Reny who is an aspiring singer, dreams of someday meeting Chayanne. Chayanne is (in real life and in the telenovela) an international singing star and teen idol.

Reny’s dream comes true when her boyfriend, Santiago, a music producer, arranges a meeting to happen after one of Chayanne's concerts. As the drama unfolds, Reny becomes increasingly famous, and her bond with Chayanne evolves into romance.

However, Santiago becomes increasingly jealous and angry. Reny becomes afraid of Santiago and starts seeing him less often. Santiago's lawyer, Tony, starts to develop an interest in Reny. While this plays out, Reny’s sister Sandra also becomes jealous of her success and the fact that their father left the family fortune to Reny.

Unknown to viewers for most of the telenovela is that Sandra suffers from a degenerative mental illness, which explains Reny’s father not leaving the fortune to Sandra. Sandra and Santiago create a diabolic plan where they will make Reny have an accident during one of her concerts. Their plan succeeds, leaving Reny paralyzed and with amnesia after her fall.

Eventually, she recovers and begins to walk again, and plans to return to the show business under the name of Chaquira. She uses this pseudonym to not tip off her enemies as to who she really is and that she's still alive.

Through all of this, and before Reny’s accident, a fan of hers, Lalo, becomes her friend and falls in love with her. This causes tension with Jessica, who has just broken up with Poncho. Jessica becomes enemies with Reny and her attraction towards Lalo fuels Poncho's anger and jealousy.

Chayanne had to leave Reny because of his professional compromises. During this time, Tony started to move in on her. He became her greatest ally and protector during the time she was in her wheelchair, and a great deal of love grows between them.

Tony ended up protecting Reny from Santiago, who himself ends up paralyzed and jailed. Jessica moved to Guadalajara, Jalisco after finding she was suffering a terrible disease, Lalo purposely gets himself killed in a motorcycle crash, and Chayanne decides that he and Reny should stay only as good friends due to their busy singing careers.

Sandra gets committed to a mental hospital. Reny starts using her real name again and makes a big comeback into the musical world where she goes on a tour. At the end, Tony marries her and they have a family together.

== Cast ==
- Yuri as Renata "Reny" Jiménez / Chaquira
- Chayanne as himself
- Rafael Sánchez Navarro as Santiago Ugalde
- Carmelita González as Encarnación
- María Elena Saldaña as Tina
- Claudia Silva as Sandra "Sandy" Jiménez / Sandunga
- Silvia Suárez as Susana Ugalde
- Pilar Montenegro as Jessica
- Carlos Miguel as Poncho
- Luis Couturier as Gabriel Jiménez
- Margarita Isabel as Aurora
- Raúl Alberto as Mike
- Mauricio Islas as Freddy Landeros
- Guillermo García Cantú as Antonio "Tony" Resendiz
- Fernando Ciangherotti as Eduardo "Lalo" Villafañe
- Paco Ibáñez as Gustavo
- Luisa Huertas as Magda
- Vilma Traca as Teodora
- Roberto Tello as Coreano
- Alejandro Aragón as Dr. Francisco
- Ricardo Barona as Humberto Navarro
- Sussan Taunton as Rita
- Radamés de Jesús as Paul
- José Luis Avendaño as Dr. Humberto
- Karyme Lozano as Liliana de Zares
- Leonor Llausás as Anita
- Isadora González as Sonia
- Adriana Lavat as Flor
- Patricia Martínez as Ágata
- Alfonso Mier y Terán as Toby Reyes Retana de las Altas Torres
- Mónica Dossetti as Karla Greta Reyes Retana de las Altas Torres
- Beatriz Monroy as Adelina
- Konnan as Himself
- Beatriz Martinez
- María Montejo
- Gustavo Bermudez
- Fernando Pinkus
- Jaime Puga
- Roberto Ruy
- Lorena Álvarez
- Verónica Macías
- Graciela Magaña
- Baltazar Oviedo
- Rubén Santana
- Alfredo Escobar
- Paola Rodríguez
- Roxana Castellanos
- Ramón Coriat
- Abigail Martínez
- Ricardo Silva
- Manuel Benítez
- Rafael Valdés
- Laura Serrano as herself

== Awards and nominations ==
Year	Award	Category	Nominee	Result
1995	13th TVyNovelas Awards	Best Telenovela	Emilio Larrosa	Nominated
1995	13th TVyNovelas Awards	Best Antagonist Actor	Rafael Sánchez Navarro	Nominated
1995	13th TVyNovelas Awards	Best Leading Actress	Carmelita González	Nominated
1995	13th TVyNovelas Awards	Best Young Lead Actor	Guillermo García Cantú	Nominated
1995	13th TVyNovelas Awards	Best Female Revelation	Claudia Silva	Nominated
1995	13th TVyNovelas Awards	Best Male Revelation	Radamés de Jesús	Nominated
1995	13th TVyNovelas Awards	Highest-rated Telenovela in Mexico		Won
1995	Eres Awards	Best Musical Theme	Volver a empezar by Yuri	Won
