= Claudia Silva (actress) =

Mexican actress, radio host and writer

- Born: October 9, 1972 (age 53); Mexico City, Mexico
- Occupations: television and radio actress, writer

Claudia de Guadalupe Silva Zamora (born October 9, 1972 in Mexico City) is a Mexican actress and writer. She is perhaps best known for her role of "Sandra" (also known as "Sandy" and "Sandunga") on the 1994 Televisa television telenovela "Volver a Empezar", for which she received a nomination at the 1995 Premios TVyNovelas as the best feminine revelation of the year. She is also a radio show host and a book writer.

== Early life ==
Silva was born in Mexico City.

When she was only fourteen years old, Silva debuted on Mexican television, acting in Televisa's sitcom, "Papá soltero" ("Single Dad"), where she participated in several episodes.

== Career ==
Silva's career and celebrity took off when "Volver a Empezar", a telenovela in which she acted alongside Yuri (playing Yuri's character's sister "Sandra"), Puerto Rican singer and actor Chayanne, Pilar Montenegro and Rafael Sanchez Navarro, among others, was shown on Televisa during 1994.

After appearing in various other telenovelas and sitcoms for the next twenty or so years, Silva decided to retire from television in 2013, but she returned in 2021 on a show named "Que Le Pasa a mi Familia?".

== Radio career ==
Silva also participates in a radio show, named "Dispara, Margot, Dispara!" ("Shoot, Margot, Shoot") which is transmitted on the Mexican radio station, MVS Radio.

Silva is known for her characterization of "Ximena de la Macorra", a well-to-do upscale-society young girl who believes there is no poverty in Mexico.

== Book ==
In 2016, Silva published a book, named "Diario de una Niña Bien" ("A well-off Girl's Diary"), based on her character "Ximena de la Macorra".

== See also ==
- List of Mexicans
