= Tú y yo (TV series) =

- Genre: Telenovela; Romance; Drama
- Directed by: Alfredo Tappan
- Starring: Maribel Guardia; Joan Sebastian; Olga Breeskin; Itatí Cantoral; Francisco Gattorno
- Theme music composer: Joan Sebastian & Maribel Guardia
- Opening theme: Tú y Yo by Joan Sebastian & Maribel Guardia
- Country of origin: Mexico
- Original language: Spanish
- No. of episodes: 141

Production
- Executive producer: Emilio Larrosa
- Production locations: Filming; Televisa San Ángel; Mexico City, Mexico
- Running time: 41-44 minutes 21-22 minutes
- Production company: Televisa

Original release
- Network: Canal de las Estrellas
- Release: September 9, 1996 – March 20, 1997

Tú y yo (English: You and Me) is a Mexican telenovela produced by Emilio Larrosa for Televisa in 1996.

On Wednesday, September 9, 1996, Canal de las Estrellas started broadcasting Tú y yo weekdays at 9:30pm, replacing Cañaveral de Pasiones. The last episode was broadcast on Thursday, March 20, 1997.

Maribel Guardia and Joan Sebastian starred as protagonists, while Olga Breeskin, Itatí Cantoral, Arleth Terán and Claudio Báez starred as antagonists. Francisco Gattorno, Lola Merino, Arath de la Torre and Sebastián Ligarde starred as stellar performances.

== Cast ==
- Maribel Guardia as Estela Díaz-Infante de Santillana
- Joan Sebastian as Tomás Santillana
- Olga Breeskin as Lucrecia Álvarez Albarran
- Itatí Cantoral as Cassandra Santillana Álvarez
- Francisco Gattorno as Ricardo Vásquez
- Lola Merino as Alicia Santillana Díaz-Infante
- Sebastián Ligarde as Arturo Álvarez
- Claudio Báez as Roberto Álvarez Albarran
- Ramón Valdés Urtiz as Fernando Santillana Díaz-Infante
- Anahí as Melissa Álvarez
- Alfredo Adame as Carlos Augusto Beltran Hinojosa
- Lourdes Munguía as Alejandra
- Maribel Fernández as Doña Graciela "Chelo" López Beristain
- César Bono as Ciriaco "El Toques"
- José Ángel García as Juan José Iturralde
- Anel as Laura/Elena Campos
- Juan Carlos Casasola as Gonzalo
- José Flores as Wilfredo Díaz
- María Montejo as Cleofas
- Lisette Morelos as Linda López
- Arleth Terán as Bárbara Camacho Urrea
- Arath de la Torre as Javier Álvarez Albarran/Saúl Gutiérrez
- José Joel as Francisco "Paco" Vásquez
- Silvia Eugenia Derbez as Yolanda Vásquez
- Ana María Aguirre as Virginia de Vásquez
- Mónika Sánchez as Martha
- Carlos Rotzinger as Adolfo Montemayor
- Ana Luisa Peluffo as Catalina Vda. de Díaz-Infante
- Andrea García as Lucrecia (young)
- Marlene Favela as Luisa Marcano Rojas
- Alejandro Ávila as Tomás (young)
- Jorge Poza as Humberto
- Roxana Castellanos as Elizabeth
- Bobby Larios as Sebastián Domínguez
- Scarlet Gruber as Isabel Morelos
- Galilea Montijo as Resignacion del Carmen
- Carlos Miguel Suarez as Poncho
- Roberto Tello as Coreano

== Awards ==
| Year | Award | Category | Nominee | Result |
|---|---|---|---|---|
| 1997 | 15th TVyNovelas Awards | Best Debut Actress | Galilea Montijo | Nominated |
| 1997 | 15th TVyNovelas Awards | Best Debut Actress | Lisette Morelos | Nominated |
| 1997 | 15th TVyNovelas Awards | Best Debut Actor | Ramón Valdés Urtiz | Nominated |
