= Mi segunda madre =

Mexican telenovela

- Genre: Telenovela; Drama
- Created by: Abel Santa Cruz
- Written by: Eric Vonn; Nora Alemán; Eduardo Quiroga; Lorena Salazar
- Directed by: Miguel Córcega; José Caballero; Irma Lozano
- Starring: María Sorté; Enrique Novi; Fernando Ciangherotti; Daniela Castro; Alejandra Maldonado; Alfredo Adame; Liliana Abud
- Opening theme: Sóla by María Sorté
- Ending theme: Moments in Love by Art of Noise; Donna by Art of Noise
- Country of origin: Mexico
- Original language: Spanish
- No. of episodes: 200 (duration of 26-30 min); 100 (duration of 56-60 min)

Production
- Executive producer: Juan Osorio
- Producer: Alessandro Jacchia
- Production locations: Mexico City, Mexico; Monterrey, Mexico
- Cinematography: Gabriel Vázquez Bulmán; Alejandro Frutos; Ernesto Arreola; Leopoldo Terrazas; Juan Carlos Frutos
- Running time: 21-22 minutes

Original release
- Network: Canal de las Estrellas
- Release: January 16 – October 13, 1989

Related
- Nuevo amanecer; Un rostro en mi pasado; Por siempre mi amor (2013)

Mi segunda madre (English: My second mother) is a Mexican telenovela produced by Juan Osorio for Televisa and broadcast by Canal de las Estrellas in 1989. It starred María Sorté, Enrique Novi and Daniela Castro as protagonists, with Fernando Ciangherotti and Alejandra Maldonado and Cynthia Klitbo as antagonists.

== Plot ==
Daniela Lorente is an excellent designer, owner of a prestigious fashion house. She is married to Alberto, a bad man who has another wife and two children and steals money from him. One day Daniela discovers Alberto and decides to call the police to lock him up. When denounced by his wife Alberto he is sentenced to 10 years of imprisonment, swearing revenge on Daniela for having handed him over.

On the other hand, Juan Antonio Méndez Davila is an important businessman who has just suffered the death of his wife, leaving him only with a little girl named Mónica. Unfortunately for the little girl, her father has a frivolous and vain lover, Irene Montenegro. Daniela and Juan Antonio, both separately, decide to take a cruise to rest and forget about the problems that afflict them, in this way they meet on board and inevitably fall in love

The fortune to know each other is so great and the two are so happy that they decide to marry but Mónica does not want to accept Daniela as her second mother, even so Daniela loves her husband's daughter and little by little she manages to win the girl, who is Badly advised by Leticia, a schoolmate who envies Monica and pretends to be her friend to put ideas into her head against Daniela. After a time and various treatments, Daniela manages to get pregnant, which revives Monica's jealousy causing her to reject Daniela again. As her pregnancy progresses, the evil Irene pays a criminal named Germán who causes her a car accident. The event has terrible consequences for both Daniela and her son: Daniela is sterile due to the complications of delivery and her baby is premature and dies three weeks later.

Daniela is on the verge of suicide due to the death of her son. Monica seeing Daniela's suffering begins to love her and one day she finally calls her mom. 8 years later, Monica has grown up and is a beautiful woman and is the girlfriend of Lalo, Alberto's oldest son. Juan Antonio continues with great success in business but Daniela has not been able to overcome the death of her baby. In truth, Daniela's suffering is far from over: the past threatens her when Alberto leaves prison ready to take revenge on her for having sentenced him to confinement, for which he seduces Monica to destroy her family.

== Cast ==
- María Sorté as Daniela Lorente de Saucedo / de Méndez Dávila
- Daniela Castro as Mónica Méndez Dávila
- Enrique Novi as Juan Antonio Méndez Dávila
- Fernando Ciangherotti as Alberto Saucedo Maldonado
- Alejandra Maldonado as Irene Montenegro Olvera de Sánchez
- Alfredo Adame as Hans Lutmann
- Liliana Abud as Sonia Méndez Villanueva de Ramos
- Claudio Báez as Gerardo Peña Domínguez
- Arsenio Campos as Felipe Bretón
- Gina Moret as Gina Reis
- Ada Carrasco as Dolores "Lolita" de Astuariz
- Ernesto Gómez Cruz as Ignacio "Nacho"
- Cynthia Klitbo as Leticia Platas Amador
- Irma Lozano as Eva Enriquez Platas
- Héctor Suárez Gomis as Ramón
- Toño Mauri as Federico "Fico"
- Lola Merino as María Gardenia "Margarita"
- Andrés Bonfiglio as Eduardo "Lalo" Saucedo Morales
- Blanca Torres as Amanda Morales
- Ana Bertha Espín as Amelia López
- Irlanda Mora as Angélica Hurtado
- Angelina Peláez as Arcelia Gomez
- Roberto Blandón as Marcelo
- Raquel Morell as Raquel de Astuariz
- Roberto Palazuelos as David
- Juan Verduzco as Enrique Ramos
- Gastón Tuset as Alejandro Oviedo
- Guy de Saint Cyr as Gonzalo
- Francesca Guillen as Luisita Peña
- Diana Ferretti as Carolina Morales Chávez de Saucedo
- Abel Salazar as Rafael Iglesias
- Carlos Riquelme as Justino Aguilar
- Berenice Dominguez as Mónica Méndez (girl)
- Lucero Lander as Lucía de Méndez Dávila
- Héctor Pons as Lalo (child)
- Alejandra Gollas as Leticia (girl)
- Lupita Ochoa as Margarita (girl)
- Cristian Castro as Rubén Saucedo
- Estela Ruiz as Malena
- Gabriel Pingarrón as Germán
- David Rencoret as Manuel "Manolo" Astuariz
- María Almela as Dora
- Rubén Rojo as Leopoldo Sánchez
- Jorge Fegán as Matías
- Mauricio Ferrari as Roberto
- Andrea Legarreta as Denisse
- Alejandro Aragón as Fernando
- Alejandra Espejo as Matilde
- Aurora Cortés as Melina
- Polly as Brenda
- Teresa Guízar as Rosa "Rosi" Almirez
- Fernanda Ruizos as Mariana
- Agustín López Zavala as "El Maldita Sea"
- José María Torre as Manuel Justino "Tino"

== Awards ==
Year	Award	Category	Nominee	Result
1990	8th TVyNovelas Awards	Best Telenovela of the Year	Juan Osorio	Won
1990	8th TVyNovelas Awards	Best Actress	María Sorté	Won
1990	8th TVyNovelas Awards	Best Actor	Enrique Novi	Nominated
1990	8th TVyNovelas Awards	Best Antagonist Actress	Alejandra Maldonado	Nominated
1990	8th TVyNovelas Awards	Best Antagonist Actor	Fernando Ciangherotti	Won
1990	8th TVyNovelas Awards	Best Young Lead Actress	Daniela Castro	Nominated
1990	8th TVyNovelas Awards	Best Debut Actor	Alfredo Adame	Won
1990	8th TVyNovelas Awards	Best Original Story or Adaptation	Eric Vonn	Won
1990	8th TVyNovelas Awards	Best Direction of the Cameras	Alejandro Frutos	Won
