= Amargo destino =

- Directed by: Roberto Guinar
- Written by: Roberto Guinar
- Produced by: Charito Guinar
- Starring: Roberto Guinar; Lorena Herrera
- Cinematography: Marcelo López
- Release date: 1993
- Country: Mexico
- Language: Spanish

Amargo destino Is a film that stars Roberto Guinar and Lorena Herrera and is directed by Roberto Guinar.

== Cast ==
- Roberto Guinar
- Lorena Herrera
- Guillermo Inclán
- Abril Campillo
- Queta Lavat
- Charito Guinar
- José Loza
- Enrique Márquez
- Francisco Garduño
- Marcelo López
- Manuel Cepeda
- Cheryl Mackey
- Marco Bacuzzi
- Rafael Estrada
- José L. Sanabria
- Carmen Navarrete
- Armando Cruz
