= Martha Julia =

Mexican actress

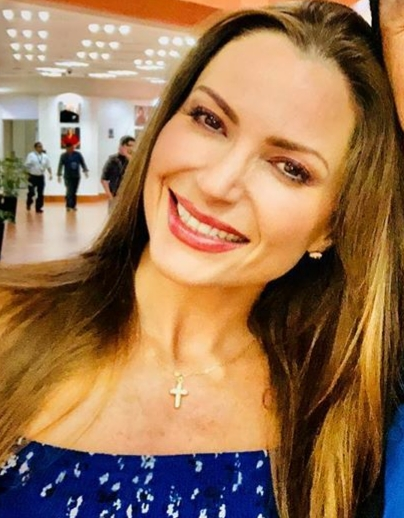
- Martha Julia
- Occupation: Actress
- Children: Richie

Martha Julia (Spanish pronunciation: [ˈmaɾtaˈxulja]) is a Mexican actress. She is best known for playing Isadora Duarte Montalvo in the telenovela Destilando Amor.

== Career ==
Martha Julia debuted as soap opera actress in 1995 playing Consuelo Flores, a mistress, in the melodrama El premio mayor. Two years later she returned as the same character in Salud, dinero y amor. She returned to television in 2001 in the soap opera Amigas y rivales playing the character of Margarita.

She acted in the soap operas Las vías del amor (2002) and Luciana y Nicolás (2003), the latter which was filmed in Peru. In May 2004, she participated as a housemate/tenant in Big Brother VIP 3 (Part 2). In 2005, she acted in the soap opera La Madrastra as the character Ana Rosa.

Later in 2007, Martha Julia was in the soap opera Destilando Amor playing the antagonist Isadora. In 2008, she joined the cast of Alma de Hierro as Paty, which was produced by Roberto Gómez Fernández.

In 2010, she was a villain in Niña de mi corazón, a production of Pedro Damián, playing the character Tamara. In October of that same year, she had a role as a maid-of-honor in Soy tu dueña, a production of Nicandro Díaz González. Later that year she joined the cast of Cuando me enamoro, produced by Carlos Moreno Laguillo, in the role of Marina.

Martha Julia played the antagonist Flor Escutia in Corona de lágrimas.

== Filmography ==
=== Television roles ===
Year	Title	Role	Notes
2026	Mi rival	Georgina Rodríguez	Main cast
2024	Amor amargo	Magdalena Murray	Main cast
2023	Tierra de esperanza	Adriana Espinoza	Main cast
2023	Mi camino es amarte	Marisol	Guest role
2022	La madrastra	Florencia Linares de Tejada	Main cast
2021	Diseñando tu amor	Patricia	Main cast
2021	La mexicana y el güero	Vanessa	Guest role
2019	El Club	Regina	Supporting role
2018	Por amar sin ley	Denise	4 episodes
2017	En tierras salvajes	Alba	Supporting role
2017	La candidata	Jessica	Guest role
2015-2016	A que no me dejas	Ileana	Recurring role
2013-2014	Por siempre mi amor	Gabriela	Main cast
2012-2018	Como dice el dicho	Various roles	5 episodes
2012-2022	Corona de lágrimas	Flor Escutia	Supporting role
2012	Por Ella Soy Eva	Samantha	Guest Star
2010-2011	Cuando me enamoro	Marina Sepúlveda	Supporting role
2010	Niña de mi Corazón	Tamara Diez	Supporting role
2008-2009	Alma de Hierro	Patricia 'Paty' Jiménez de la Corcuera	Main cast
2007	Destilando Amor	Isadora Duarte	Main cast
2006	Olvidarte Jamas	Lucrecia Montero	Main cast
2005	La Madrastra	Ana Rosa Márquez	Supporting role
2003-2004	Luciana y Nicolás	Lorena	Supporting role
2002-2003	Las Vías del Amor	Sandra Irribaren	Main cast
2001-2002	Mujer, Casos de la Vida Real	Various roles	5 episodes
2001	Amigas y Rivales	Margarita	Supporting role
1997-1998	Salud, dinero y amor	Consuelo	Supporting role
1995-1996	El premio mayor	Consuelo	Supporting role
