= Muchachitas =

Mexican telenovela

- Genre: Telenovela; Romance; Drama
- Created by: Emilio Larrosa
- Written by: Emilio Larrosa; Verónica Suárez; Alejandro Pohlenz
- Directed by: Alfredo Gurrola; José Ángel García
- Starring: Alejandro Camacho; Cecilia Tijerina; Tiaré Scanda; Emma Laura; Kate del Castillo; Laura León
- Theme music composer: Lorena Tassinari
- Opening theme: "Muchachitas" by Lorena Tassinari
- Country of origin: Mexico
- Original language: Spanish
- No. of episodes: 200

Production
- Executive producer: Emilio Larrosa
- Production locations: Mexico City; Acapulco; Cancún; New York City
- Running time: 41-44 minutes
- Production company: Televisa

Original release
- Network: Canal de las Estrellas
- Release: June 24, 1991 – March 27, 1992

Muchachitas (English title: Girls) is a Mexican telenovela produced by Emilio Larrosa for Televisa in 1991. The telenovela was also shown on Univisión in the early 1990s.

It stars Alejandro Camacho, Cecilia Tijerina, Tiaré Scanda, Emma Laura, Kate del Castillo and Laura León.

== Plot ==
Four girls (Mónica, Elena, Leticia and Isabel) enroll in an art academy to pursue their dreams of careers in acting and singing. The four are from different backgrounds:

- Monica is wealthy but humble and sweet. She dates Rodrigo, who works under her father at their supermarket and drives a taxi on the side. When Rodrigo is framed by Monica's cousin Federico and sent to jail for industrial espionage, she stands by him, but she cannot forget her previous boyfriend Roger, who was also the object of attempted murder by Federico.
- Elena is poor and tough. She was Rodrigo's first girlfriend, but Rodrigo dumped her for Monica, causing a rift between the two girls. Later, however, it is revealed that Elena's father is also Monica's biological father; their respective mothers, also active in theater, had been friends and rivals.
- Isabel is middle-class and selfless. She lives with her widowed father. She gets involved with Pedro, who turns out to be married, but though Pedro's terminally ill wife forgives her and entrusts her with the care of their daughter, Betty, she distrusts Pedro.
- Leticia is a middle-class social climber, who is not hesitant to speak her mind and to pretend to get on with rich men. She eventually "marries" Federico, not realizing that the wedding has no legal effect (the license was not properly filed). She is later sent to work for her grandmother, who was also once a social climber but has mellowed and grown wiser.

== Cast ==
- Cecilia Tijerina as Mónica Sánchez-Zúñiga Montealegre
- Tiaré Scanda as Elena Olivares Pérez
- Kate del Castillo as Leticia Bustamante Ballesteros
- Emma Laura as Isabel Flores Falcón
- Jorge Lavat as Guillermo Sánchez-Zúñiga
- Alejandro Camacho as Federico Cantú Sánchez-Zúñiga
- Laura León as Esther Pérez de Olivares
- Pilar Pellicer as Martha Sánchez-Zúñiga Vda. de Cantú
- Roberto Palazuelos as Roger Guzmán
- María Rojo as Esperanza Ballesteros de Bustamante
- July Furlong as Verónica Montealegre de Sánchez-Zúñiga #1 (episodes 1–96)
- Tina Romero as Verónica Montealegre de Sánchez-Zúñiga #2 (episodes 97–200)
- Diego Schoening as Rodrigo Suárez
- Carlos Cardán as José "Pepe" Olivares
- Sergio Kleiner as Alberto Barbosa
- Gabriela Araujo as Profesora Carmen Márquez
- Edith Kleiman as Angélica Benítez
- Antonio Medellín as Alfredo Flores
- Manolita Saval as Enriqueta
- Armando de Pascual as Francisco "Pancho" Bustamante
- Charlie Massó as Mauricio Rubio
- Mercedes Pascual as Bertha Vda. de Ballesteros
- Mario Sauret as Don Julio Linares
- Ari Telch as Joaquín Barbosa
- Arturo Alegro as Don Héctor Suárez
- Kenia Gazcón as Margarita Villaseñor
- Lorena Herrera as Claudia Villaseñor
- Carlos Rotzinger as Luis Villaseñor
- Tere Salinas as Paola
- José Flores as Rolando Fasoles
- Raúl Alberto as Raúl Rivas
- Sergio Sendel as Pedro Ortigoza Domínguez
- Ana María Aguirre as Constanza de Villaseñor
- Anahí as Betty Ortigoza
- Itatí Cantoral as Lucía Aguilera
- Carlos Miguel Suarez as Óscar Luna
- Guillermo Orea Jr. as Tolomeo
- Héctor Soberón as Víctor
- Lorena Tassinari as Lucrecia Pons
- Ricardo Barona as Abel
- Karen Sentíes as Renata Chompester
- Yolanda Ventura as Gloria
- Vanessa Villela as Andrea
- Marigel as Noemí
- Miguel Garza as Sergio
- Luis Cárdenas as Bernardo Trueba
- Karina Castañeda as Silvia Bustamante Ballesteros
- Gloria Izaguirre as Laura
- María Prado as Rosa Rivas
- Dolores Salomón "La Bodoquito" as Concha "Conchita"
- Rocío Sobrado as Andrea de Ortigoza
- Patricia Valdés
- Fernando Pinkus
- Evelyn Murillo
- Susana Carens
- Edmundo Barahona
- Amparo Garrido
- Roberto Tello

== Awards and nominations ==
Year	Award	Category	Nominee	Result
1992	10th TVyNovelas Awards	Best Antagonist Actor	Alejandro Camacho	Nominated
1992	10th TVyNovelas Awards	Best Co-lead Actor	Ari Telch	Nominated
1992	10th TVyNovelas Awards	Best Supporting Actress	Laura León	Won
1992	10th TVyNovelas Awards	Best Revelation	Kate del Castillo	Nominated
1992	10th TVyNovelas Awards	Best Revelation	Tiaré Scanda	Won
1993	Latin ACE Awards	Best Supporting Actor	Alejandro Camacho	Won
