= Mi pequeña traviesa =

Mexican telenovela

- Genre: Telenovela
- Starring: Enrique Rocha; Michelle Vieth; Héctor Soberón; Carmen Salinas
- Opening theme: "Te quiero tanto, tanto" by OV7
- Composer: Memo Mendez-Guiu
- Countries of origin: United States; Mexico
- Original language: Spanish (1997-1998)
- No. of episodes: 100

Production
- Executive producer: Pedro Damián

Original release
- Network: Canal de las Estrellas
- Release: December 8, 1997 – April 24, 1998

Related
- Me llaman Gorrión (1972); Gorrión (1994); Pequena Travessa (2002); Niña de mi corazón (2010)

Mi pequeña traviesa, (Little Miss Mischief) is a Mexican telenovela produced by Pedro Damián for Televisa in 1997–1998. Michelle Vieth and Héctor Soberón star as the protagonists, and Arleth Terán, Mariana Seoane and Khotan as the antagonists. It is based on the Argentine telenovela Me llaman Gorrión. It was remade in Brazil as Pequena Travessa.

== Cast ==
- Michelle Vieth as Julia Paz
- Héctor Soberón as Alberto Miranda
- Arleth Terán as Déborah Quinto
- Khotan Fernández as Ignacio "Mercurio"
- Mariana Seoane as Bárbara
- Mauricio Islas as Juan Felipe
- Enrique Rocha as Antonio Miranda
- Rafael Inclán as Marcello
- Martha Roth as Elena
- Rosario Gálvez as Sofia
- Anahí as Samantha
- Eduardo Arroyuelo as Eje 8
- Aitor Iturrioz as Hugo #1
- Arath de la Torre as Hugo #2
- Margarita Magaña as Mariana
- José María Torre as Toño
- Katie Barberi as Pamela
- Beatriz Moreno as Rosa
- Mariagna Prats as Fernanda
- Juan Carlos Bonet as Diego
- Ricardo Dalmacci as Gerardo
- Gerardo Murguía as Manuel
- Alejandra Peniche as Amalia
- Judy Ponte as Carmen
- Lorena Velázquez as Catalina
- Adrián Ramos as Don Vicente "Chente"
- Carmen Salinas as Doña Mati
- Alejandro Camacho as Dr. Raúl
- Eduardo Iduñate as Andrés
- Laisha Wilkins as Lorena
- Cecilia Suárez as Pily
- Julio Bracho as El Galaxi
- Polo Ortín as Macario
- Gerardo Albarrán as Comandante Guerra
- Cinthia Arvide as Mari Trini
- Katalina Krueger as Oxana
- Renato Bartilotti as El Sopas
- Gustavo Navarro as Martín
- Mapy Sordo as Geisha
- Odiseo Bichir as Salvador
- Tomás Goros as El Raspa
- Irán Castillo as Preciosa
