= Mujeres engañadas =

Mexican telenovela

- Genre: Telenovela
- Created by: Emilio Larrosa
- Written by: Emilio Larrosa; Alejandro Pohlenz; Ramón Larrosa; Saul Pérez Santana
- Directed by: Sergio Jiménez; José Ángel García
- Starring: Laura León; Andrés García; Arturo Peniche; Michelle Vieth; Kuno Becker; Sabine Moussier; Eric del Castillo; Elsa Aguirre
- Opening theme: Mujeres engañadas by Laura León; Infiel (only in United States) by Rocío Dúrcal
- Country of origin: Mexico
- Original language: Spanish
- No. of episodes: 120

Production
- Executive producer: Emilio Larrosa
- Production locations: Filming Televisa San Ángel Mexico City, Mexico; Locations Mexico City, Mexico
- Camera setup: Multi-camera
- Running time: 41-44 minutes
- Production company: Televisa

Original release
- Network: Canal de las Estrellas
- Release: October 25, 1999 – April 7, 2000

Mujeres engañadas (English: Deceived Women, also known as The Deceived Wife) is a Mexican telenovela produced by Emilio Larrosa for Televisa in Mexico, starring Laura León, Andrés García, Arturo Peniche, Michelle Vieth, Kuno Becker, Sabine Moussier, Eric del Castillo and Elsa Aguirre. The telenovela tells the story of four couples who live in the same apartment building.

It was broadcast on Canal de las Estrellas from October 25, 1999 until April 7, 2000 weeknights at 9 pm when it was replaced by La casa en la playa 3 days later.

International rights to the series are currently handled by the Indian-based Flair Communications, while original rights are still owned by the show's production company Televisa in Mexico and has since then made it available to stream on the Vix streaming service.

== Plot ==
Mujeres engañadas tells the story of four couples that live in the same building, within which lies and infidelity are the principal relationship and family problems that confront those involved.

The first couple are Yolanda and Javier Duarte (Laura León and Andrés García). Yolanda is a woman of humble origins who married Javier, a rich man who has two teenage daughters, María Rosa (Marisol Mijares) and Jessica (Anahí). Javier cheated on his wife, Yolanda, with a lady named Monica Romero. Javier also has an illegitimate son named Javierito with Monica.

The second couple is composed of Diana and Alejandro Lizárraga (Sabine Moussier) and Arturo Peniche). Diana is a vain and selfish woman who is obsessed with finding the secret of eternal youth. Alejandro, on the other hand, is a decent and honest man who dreams of having a child with his wife. Diana cheats on Alejandro with Pablo Rentería. When Alejandro discovers his Diana's infidelity with Pablo, he plans to get revenge on Pablo.

Paola Montero (Michelle Vieth) and César Martínez (Kuno Becker) are a young couple. Paola is very religious and lives in Veracruz, while César is an attractive young man whose greatest pleasure is to conquer women. César sleeps Maru and an angry Paola blames Maru for being intimate with César.

The fourth couple is Cecilia and Jorge Martínez (Elsa Aguirre and Eric del Castillo), César's parents, who have been married for thirty years and whose relationship has fallen into routine. Jorge cheats on his wife with a young woman named Ivette del Sagrario Campuzano del Castillo.

== Cast ==
- Laura León as Yolanda Jiménez de Duarte
- Andrés García as Javier Duarte Cortés
- Arturo Peniche as Alejandro Lizárraga
- Sabine Moussier as Diana Fernández de Lizárraga
- Michelle Vieth as Paola Montero
- Kuno Becker as César Martínez Onderain
- Eric del Castillo as Jorge Martínez
- Elsa Aguirre as Cecilia Onderain de Martínez
- Diana Golden as Mónica Romero
- Susana González as Ivette del Sagrario Campuzano
- Juan Peláez as Jefe
- Carlos Bracho as Lic. Ernesto Sierra
- Anahí as Jessica Duarte Jiménez
- José María Torre as Ricardo Hernández Chávez
- Marisol Mijares as María Rosa Duarte Jiménez
- Carlos Bonavides as Maclovio Hernández
- Maribel Fernández as Concepción "Concha" Chávez de Hernández
- Jorge De Silva as Raúl
- Víctor Noriega as Pablo Rentería
- Raymundo Capetillo as Ramiro Cifuentes
- Joana Benedek as Johanna Sierra
- Irina Areu as Florinda
- Ingrid Martz as Adriana Falcón
- Lucy Tovar as Casilda de Montero
- Andrea Becerra as Sonia Lizárraga
- Alejandra Becerra as Monserrat Lizárraga
- Elizabeth Arciniega as Guadalupe "Lupe" Edelmira Silis Chacón
- Carla Ortiz as Marujita "Maru" Lfaraopéz Guerra
- Gustavo Negrete as Aurelio
- Antonio Miguel as Liberio
- Martha Roth as Catalina Cortés
- Jorge Brenan as Edmundo
- Antonio Brenan as Ramón
- Karla Álvarez as Sonia Arteaga
- Dulce as Montserrat
- Marlene Favela as Leticia
- Oscar Traven as Roberto Duarte Cortés
- Jorge Antolín as Esteban
- Tania Vázquez as Aracely
- Claudia Troyo as Carolina Susana Montero
- Aitor Iturrioz as Manuel
- Carlos Miguel as Pastrana
- Sergio Acosta as Francisco Duarte Cortés
- Eduardo Rivera as Teniente José Luis Ortega
- Estrella Lugo as Lucía "Lucy"
- Bobby Larios as Pedro
- Ramón Valdés Urtiz as Gerardo Quintero
- Marco Antonio Maldonado as Javier "Javierito" Duarte Romero
- Juan Romanca as Sebastián
- Néstor Leoncio as Humberto Quintero
- Enrique Grey as Demetrio Zamudio
- Liliana Arriaga as La Chupitos
- Zoila Quiñones
- Ivonne Montero

== Awards and nominations ==
Year	Award	Category	Nominee	Result
2000	18th TVyNovelas Awards	Best Antagonist Actor	Víctor Noriega	Nominated
2000	18th TVyNovelas Awards	Best Leading Actor	Eric del Castillo	Won
2000	18th TVyNovelas Awards	Best Supporting Actress	Martha Roth	Won
2000	18th TVyNovelas Awards	Best Young Lead Actress	Joana Benedek	Nominated
2000	18th TVyNovelas Awards	Best Young Lead Actor	Kuno Becker	Won
2000	18th TVyNovelas Awards	Best Revelation	Anahí	Won
2000	18th TVyNovelas Awards	Best Direction	Sergio Jiménez	Won
2000	Bravo Awards	Best Production	Emilio Larrosa	Won
