= Bobby Larios =

Mexican actor, dancer, singer, conductor, radio host, and zen coach

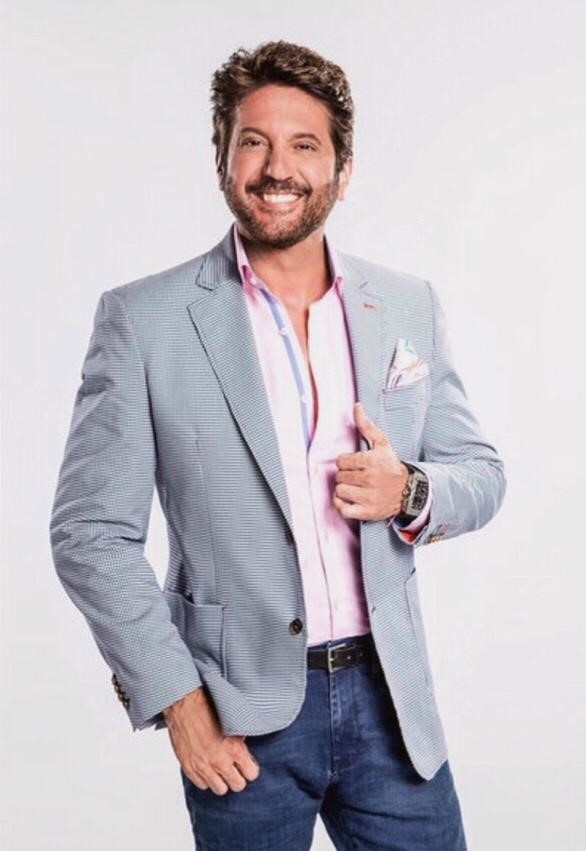
- Bobby Larios 2018
- Born: Roberto Larios
- Occupations: Actor; conductor; dancer; singer; radio host
- Years active: 1996–present
- Spouse: Evelyn Umpierrez y Niurka Markos (m. 2017)
- Children: Santiago Larios

Bobby Larios (born in Guadalajara, Jalisco, Mexico) is a Mexican actor, dancer, singer, conductor, radio host, and zen coach. He began his career in 1996. He resides in the United States.

== Acting career ==
In 1999, Larios had his first opportunity at acting in a telenovela, when he participated in Mujeres Engañadas.

Another character would follow, when he was hired for Tres Mujeres, filmed that same year. His second character, however, was a feature character. He played Mauro in Tres Mujeres.

In 2002, Larios participated as Julián de la Colina in Las Vías del Amor, and in the smash hit Clase 406, where he played Cesar.

By 2003, he was cast in his first starring role in Velo de Novia.

== Filmography ==
=== Telenovelas ===
- 2009: Valeria - David Barros
- 2007–08: Amor comprado - Hilario
- 2007: Isla Paraiso - Jorge
- 2006: La verdad oculta - Marcos Rivera Muñoz
- 2003: Velo de novia - Beto
- 2002: Las vías del amor - Julián de la Colina
- 2002: Clase 406 - César
- 1999: Mujeres engañadas - Pedro
- 1999: Tres mujeres - Mauro
- 1997: Salud, dinero y amor - Sebastián
- 1996–97: Tú y yo - Sebastián Dominguez

=== Reality shows ===
- 2010: Amigos y Rivales KR 3 - Participant with Fiorella Chirichigno (model)
