= La verdad oculta =

Mexican telenovela

- Genre: Telenovela; Romance; Drama
- Based on: El Camino Secreto by José Rendon
- Written by: José Rendon
- Directed by: Claudio Reyes; José Ángel García
- Starring: Galilea Montijo; Alejandra Barros; Gabriel Soto; Eduardo Yáñez; Julio Alemán
- Theme music composer: Manuel Alejandro
- Opening theme: "Si Te Perdiera" by Luis Miguel
- Country of origin: Mexico
- Original language: Spanish
- No. of episodes: 120

Production
- Executive producer: Emilio Larrosa
- Producer: Arturo Pedraza L.
- Production locations: Filming; Televisa San Ángel; Mexico City, Mexico; Locations; Mexico City, Mexico
- Cinematography: Gerardo Gomez Lapena; Luis Monroy
- Editors: Mauricio Cortés; Juan Alfredo Villareal
- Camera setup: Multi-camera
- Running time: 41-44 minutes
- Production company: Televisa

Original release
- Network: Canal de las Estrellas
- Release: February 27 – August 11, 2006

La verdad oculta (English: The Hidden Truth) is a Mexican telenovela produced by Emilio Larrosa for Televisa in 2006.

On Monday, February 27, 2006, Canal de las Estrellas started broadcasting La verdad oculta weekdays at 9:00pm. The last episode was broadcast on Friday, August 11, 2006.

Galilea Montijo, Gabriel Soto, Alejandra Barros and Eduardo Yáñez starred as protagonists, while Julio Alemán, Margarita Magaña, Fabián Robles, Marco Méndez and Cecilia Tijerina starred as antagonists. Héctor Ortega, Eric del Castillo, María Sorté, Irma Lozano and Genoveva Pérez starred as stellar performances.

== Plot ==
"This is a touching story of love, intrigue and secrets that revolves around two couples. The first one is David Genovés and Gabriela Guillén, a kind-hearted, intelligent girl who works as a waitress in the restaurant that David manages and belongs to his father, Mario Genovés.

The second couple is formed by Juan José, who spent 11 years in prison for a crime he did not commit and Alejandra, a young architect, who belongs to the elite social class, much too high for Juan José, but he falls in love with her at first sight and will fight to win her heart.

When Gabriela and her sister Julieta start working in the restaurant, David feels immediately drawn to her, but he is not the only one; Carlos, his partner, is also impressed by the young girl’s beauty. They soon become fierce rivals, but even though Gabriela is in love with David, the problems that arise between them make her doubt his sincerity, especially when she meets Leonardo, a police commander who becomes her protector, and cannot reveal that he too has fallen in love with her. Months will go by before she finally accepts that she truly loves David, and that his affection is real; however, their relationship will be difficult and conflictive due to Carlos’ intrigue and David’s jealous nature.

Gabriela is unaware of the fact that Fausto, her father, and Mario Genovés knew each other many years ago, and they share a dark, painful secret. Now, the reunion of these two men coincides with a terrible tragedy: Mario learns that he has an inoperable tumor and has little time left to live. To protect his son’s inheritance, knowing that his partner Adolfo is a ruthless, corrupt individual who would steal all his money, Mario persuades Fausto to wear a disguise and take his place to deceive everyone, until the term of his partnership with Adolfo expires. To this end, he builds a secret tunnel connecting his mansion with the abandoned house next door. There, Fausto will install his make-up workshop, in order to impersonate Mario.

Alejandra shares her uncle Mario’s secret and is in charge of building the secret tunnel. Juan José learns that he has inherited a fabulous fortune, which will enable him not only to fight for Alejandra’s love, but to ally himself with Fausto and Mario in their daring plan, since he, also, has an account to settle with Adolfo."

== Cast ==
=== Main ===
- Galilea Montijo as Gabriela Guillén/Gabriela Guzmán Saldívar de Genovés/Martha Saldívar de Guzmán
- Alejandra Barros as Alexandra Balmori Genovés de Victoria
- Gabriel Soto as David Genovés Ordóñez
- Eduardo Yáñez as Juan José Victoria Ocampo

=== Also main ===
- María Sorté as Yolanda Rey/Yolanda Ávila
- Julio Alemán as Adolfo Ávila
- Héctor Ortega as Santiago Guzmán/Fausto Guillén/Mario Genovés
- Irma Lozano as Dora Ramírez
- Lalo "El Mimo" as Asunción Limón
- Eric del Castillo as Gregorio Pineda
- Fabián Robles as Roberto Zárate
- Marco Méndez as Carlos Ávila Saldívar
- Cecilia Tijerina as Susana "La Chola"
- Arturo Carmona as Mauricio Medina
- Bobby Larios as Marcos Rivera Muñoz
- Margarita Magaña as Bertha Balmori Genovés
- Harry Geithner as Leonardo Faidella
- Mario Sauret as Abelardo Sánchez
- Carlos Miguel as Félix Méndez
- Jacqueline Voltaire as Déborah
- Bibelot Mansur as Guillermina "Mina" Álvarez
- Alfredo Alfonso as Salomón Zárate
- Alberto Loztin as Ramón Caballero
- Karla Lozano as Caramelo/María del Carmen Victoria Balmori
- Roberto Tello as Marrano
- Claudia Troyo as Julieta Guillén/Julieta Guzmán Saldívar
- Silvia Ramírez as Elsa Rivera Muñoz
- Dylan Obed as Chucho Chicles
- Genoveva Pérez as Doña Piedad Ocampo

=== Special participation ===
- Mónica Dossetti as Zaida Castellanos
- Rossana San Juan as Yolanda Rey (young)
- Raúl Valerio as Edgar Fausto
- Marisol González as Jimena

== Awards ==
Year	Award	Category	Nominee	Result
2006	Premios Califa de Oro	Best Performance	Marco Méndez	Won
2007	25th TVyNovelas Awards	Best Telenovela of the Year	La verdad oculta	Nominated
2007	25th TVyNovelas Awards	Best Actress	Alejandra Barros	Nominated
2007	25th TVyNovelas Awards	Best Actor	Eduardo Yáñez	Won
2007	25th TVyNovelas Awards	Best Antagonist Actress	Margarita Magaña	Nominated
2007	25th TVyNovelas Awards	Best Leading Actor	Eric del Castillo	Won
2007	25th TVyNovelas Awards	Best Leading Actor	Julio Alemán	Won
2007	25th TVyNovelas Awards	Best Young Lead Actress	Claudia Troyo	Nominated
2007	25th TVyNovelas Awards	Best Young Lead Actress	Silvia Ramírez	Nominated
2007	25th TVyNovelas Awards	Best Direction	Claudio Reyes Rubio and José Ángel García	Nominated
2007	Premios Bravo	Best Children Actress	Karla Lozano	Won
2007	Premios Bravo	Best Children Actor	Dylan Obed	Won
