= Soñadoras =

Mexican telenovela

- Genre: Telenovela
- Created by: Emilio Larrosa; Rocio Taboada; Braulio Pedraza
- Written by: Alejandro Pohlenz; Saúl Pérez; Pedro Pablo Quintanilla
- Directed by: Salvador Garcini
- Starring: Alejandra Ávalos; Arturo Peniche; Ariel López Padilla; José Carlos Ruiz; Aracely Arámbula; Michelle Vieth; Angélica Vale; Laisha Wilkins
- Opening theme: "Soñadoras" by Sentidos Opuestos
- Ending theme: "Soñadoras" by Sentidos Opuestos
- Country of origin: Mexico
- Original language: Spanish
- No. of seasons: 1
- No. of episodes: 174

Production
- Executive producer: Emilio Larrosa
- Producer: Arturo Pedraza
- Cinematography: Miguel Lopéz; Luis Monroy; Miguel Valdés
- Editors: Adrián Frutos; Juan Carlos Frutos
- Production company: Televisa

Original release
- Network: Canal de las Estrellas
- Release: August 31, 1998 – April 30, 1999

Soñadoras (Dreamers in English) is a Mexican telenovela produced and created by Emilio Larrosa with Rocio Taboada and Braulio Pedraza for Televisa in 1998.

The original rights to the series currently belongs to the show's production company Televisa, which made the entire series available to stream on ViX in Mexico, while international rights to it are currently held by India's Flair Communications.

== Plot ==
Psychologist Fernanda, grieving the murder of her fiancé and her father's paralysis from a shooting, works at a rehab center. She's pursued by ruthless drug lord Eugenio, while finding comfort with writer Jose Luis, who hides a dark secret.

As Fernanda and Jose Luis's relationship grows, Eugenio plots against him, discovering his own daughter Jaqueline also loves Jose Luis. Jaqueline is pursued by Manuel, while her friend Emilia, a dancer, is in a relationship with rocker Gerardo until dancer Enrique falls for her. These intertwined relationships create a web of love and rivalry.

Wealthy but unattractive Lucía falls for Gerardo, while being pursued by Beto. Julieta, ashamed of her poverty, develops bulimia and lies about being wealthy, initially pursuing wealthy doctor Carlos before becoming interested in affluent student Ruben. When Ruben discovers her lies, he breaks up with her, believing she was after his money.

Julieta then dates Beto. Lucía, with Ana's help, undergoes a transformation and seeks revenge on Gerardo, who was pity-dating her. Gerardo discovers Lucía is actually Adriana, but they reconcile.

Boxer Lenny meets Jaqueline and falls for her, but their relationship is complicated by Manuel, who also loves her and makes Lenny his rival. Lenny, known for his temper, also seeks revenge on drug lord Eugenio's henchman, David, for getting his friend Sandro addicted to drugs.

== Cast ==
=== Main cast ===
- Alejandra Ávalos as Fernanda Guzmán
- Arturo Peniche as Don José Luis Dueñas
- Ariel López Padilla as Enrique Bernal
- José Carlos Ruiz as Don Eugenio de la Peña, a drug lord and Jacqueline's father. Main villain
- Arath de la Torre as Adalberto "Beto" Roque
- Eduardo Verástegui as Manuel Jr.
- Diego Schoening as Benjamín "El Terco"
- Jan as Gerardo Rinalde
- Julián Moreno as Leonard "Lenny" Paleta
- Aracely Arámbula as Jacqueline de la Peña
- Michelle Vieth as Lucía de la Macorra
- Angélica Vale as Julieta Ruiz Castañeda
- Laisha Wilkins as Emilia González

=== Supporting cast ===
- Alejandro Aragón as Dr. Carlos Muñoz
- Gustavo Rojo as Don Alfredo Guzmán, Fernanda's father
- Silvia Eugenia Derbez as Rosita Ruiz Castañeda
- Mónica Dossetti as Vanessa
- Antonio Miguel as Director
- Alfonso Kaffiti
- Theo Tapia as Don Manuel
- Polo Ortín as Octavio Ruiz
- Zoila Quiñones as Maité Castañeda de Ruiz
- Lupita Lara as Viviana
- Santiago Perez as Don Felipe Paleta
- Mariana Karr as Nancy González
- Rudy Casanova as David "El Cubano", Don Eugenio's henchman
- Sergio DeFassio as Pedro Roque
- Ramón Valdés as Rodolfo
- Roberto Tello as Victorio
- Dulce as Antonia de la Macorra

=== Extended cast ===
- Irán Castillo as Ana Linares
- Kuno Becker as Rubén Berraizábal
- Mike Biaggio as Adolfo

=== Special participation ===
- Raymundo Capetillo as Horacio de la Macorra
