= Héctor Soberón =

Mexican actor

- Born: Héctor Soberón Lorenzo; August 11, 1964 (age 61); Mexico City, Mexico
- Years active: 1991-present
- Spouse(s): Janet Durón (2006–present); Michelle Vieth (2002–2004)
- Children: 2

Héctor Soberón Lorenzo (born August 11, 1964), better known as Héctor Soberón, is a Mexican actor.

== Acting career ==
Hector Soberon is a well known theater, film and television actor. He was born in Mexico City. He obtained a bachelor's degree as an electronic engineer and his artistic career began as a professional model in 1987. Emphasized by his discipline, Hector was awarded with the "omni" as the best model for pasarela and fixed photography. He filmed over 100 TV. Commercials for outstanding brands and was selected to be the only model for Hugo Boss in Mexico in that time. In 1992 begins his TV. Trajectory as an actor, working for the two mayor broadcasting companies of greater international prestige in Mexico ( Televisa and TV.Azteca ) where he participated in many series and soap operas of great success such as: "Muchachitas", "Maria la del Barrio", "el Amor no es como lo pintan", "papa soltero" and "mi pequena traviesa" among others. He has participated in films, like just to name a few : "morena", "sexual education in brief lessons", "la curva del olvido" while in the international arena he shares credits with Harvey Keitel and Miguel Sandoval in the film called "Puerto Vallarta Squeeze", and also "cuento sin hadas", "carpem diem". In theater his most outstanding projection came with his participation in the play "ps. Your Cat is Dead" sharing credits with famous actor Mr. Otto Sirgo, where they were both awarded bye the critics as revelations for the years 1997. Hector has also participated as a host for festivals like "Acapulco Fest" and recently participated in radio broadcasting with his own programs. In 2005 Hector decides to go one step forward with his acting career by immigrating to the United States of America, where he was very well received by the audiences after personifying a villain for the soap opera "olvidarte jamas" produced by Univision. Recently we saw him acting the role of a personal disease in the productions "other people's sins" by Telemundo. Hector is currently participating in several projects where emphasizes his passion to his career by delivering all his professionalism, and respect in every single project where he is involved.

== Films ==
- 2011: Cuento sin hadas
- 2009: Carpe Diem as Alain
- 2008: Mea Culpa as Raúl Villanueva
- 2005: Cafe Estrés
- 2004: La curva del olvido
- 2003: Puerto Vallarta Squeeze as Rivera's Driver
- 1997: Campeón
- 1994: Educación sexual en breves lecciones as Esteban
- 1994: Morena as Juan Casas

== Telenovelas ==
- 2017: Milagros de Navidad as Marquez
- 2014: Siempre Tuya Acapulco as Ulises Santander
- 2011: Corazon Apasionado as Alvaro Martinez
- 2010: Alguien Te Mira as Daniel Vidal
- 2007–2008: Pecados Ajenos as Gary Mendoza
- 2006: Mi Vida Eres Tu as Lucho
- 2006: Acorralada as Horacio
- 2006: Olvidarte Jamas as Renato
- 2001: Como En El Cine as Enrique
- 2000: El amor no es como lo pintan as César Segovia Sabatié
- 1999: Marea Brava as Daniel
- 1998: Gotita de amor as Dr. Alberto
- 1997: Mi pequeña traviesa as Alberto Miranda
- 1996: Para toda la vida as Alfredo
- 1995: María la del Barrio as Vladimir de la Vega
- 1995: María José as Darío
- 1992: Mágica juventud as Miguel
- 1991: Muchachitas as Víctor
