= Emilio Larrosa =

Mexican producer

- Born: Emilio Larrosa Irigoyen; November 23, 1941 (age 84); Mexico City
- Occupation: Producer
- Years active: 1958-2015
- Spouse: Norma Philippe

Emilio Larrosa (born Emilio Larrosa Irigoyen in Mexico) is a Mexican producer who has produced cultural programs, sitcoms, newscasts, telenovelas / soap operas among other contents for Televisa.

== Filmography ==
Executive Producer, Original Stories, Adaptation
| Year | Title | Notes |
|---|---|---|
| 1986-87 | El Camino Secreto | Executive Producer |
| 1991-92 | Al filo de la muerte | Executive Producer |
| 1991-92 | Muchachitas | Original Stories |
| 1991-92 | Muchachitas | Executive Producer |
| 1992-93 | Mágica juventud | Original Stories |
| 1992-93 | Mágica juventud | Executive Producer |
| 1993-94 | Dos mujeres, un camino | Executive Producer |
| 1994-95 | Volver a Empezar | Executive Producer |
| 1995-96 | El premio mayor | Original Stories |
| 1995-96 | El premio mayor | Executive Producer |
| 1996-97 | Tú y yo | Executive Producer |
| 1997-98 | Salud, dinero y amor | Executive Producer |
| 1998-99 | Soñadoras | Original Stories |
| 1998-99 | Soñadoras | Executive Producer |
| 1999–2000 | Mujeres engañadas | Executive Producer |
| 2001 | Amigas y rivales | Original Stories |
| 2001 | Amigas y rivales | Executive Producer |
| 2002–2003 | Las vías del amor | Original Stories |
| 2002–2003 | Las vías del amor | Executive Producer |
| 2004–2005 | Mujer de madera | Original Stories |
| 2004–2005 | Mujer de madera | Executive Producer |
| 2006 | La verdad oculta | Executive Producer |
| 2007 | Muchachitas como tú | Adaptation |
| 2007 | Muchachitas como tú | Executive Producer |
| 2009–2010 | Hasta que el dinero nos separe | Adaptation |
| 2009–2010 | Hasta que el dinero nos separe | Executive Producer |
| 2011–2012 | Dos hogares | Original Stories |
| 2011–2012 | Dos hogares | Executive Producer |
| 2013 | Libre para amarte | Adaptation |
| 2013 | Libre para amarte | Executive Producer |
| 2015 | Amores con trampa | Executive Producer |

== Awards and nominations ==
=== Premios TVyNovelas ===
As Executive Producer
| Year | Category | Telenovela | Result |
|---|---|---|---|
| 1987 | Best Telenovela of the Year | El Camino Secreto | Nominated |
| 1992 | Best Telenovela of the Year | Muchachitas | Nominated |
| 1994 | Best Telenovela of the Year | Dos mujeres, un camino | Nominated |
| 2000 | Best Telenovela of the Year | Mujeres engañadas | Nominated |
| 2007 | Best Telenovela of the Year | La verdad oculta | Nominated |
| 2010 | Best Telenovela of the Year | Hasta que el dinero nos separe | Won |
| 2012 | Best Telenovela of the Year | Dos hogares | Nominated |

As Writer
| Year | Category | Telenovela | Result |
|---|---|---|---|
| 1996 | Best Original Idea | El premio mayor | Won |
| 2010 | Best Original Story or Adaptation | Hasta que el dinero nos separe | Nominated |
| 2012 | Best Original Story or Adaptation | Dos hogares | Nominated |

=== Premios People en Español ===
| Year | Category | Telenovela | Result |
|---|---|---|---|
| 2010 | Best Telenovela | Hasta Que el Dinero Nos Separe | Won |
| 2010 | Best Remake | Hasta Que el Dinero Nos Separe | Nominated |
