= Héctor Suárez Gomís =

Mexican actor and singer

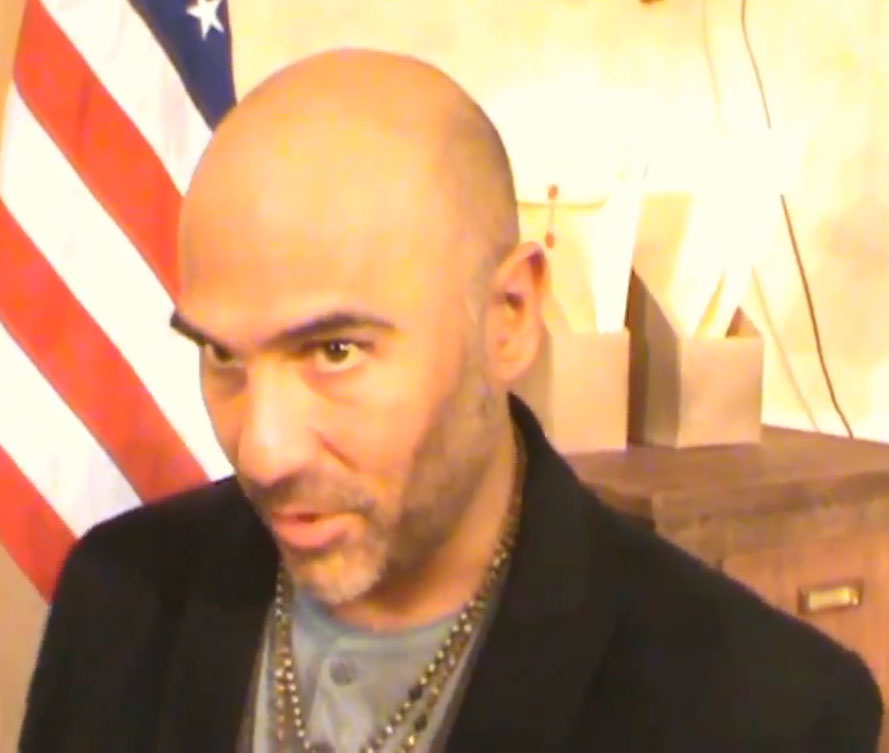
Hector Suarez Gomis interview

Héctor Suárez Gomís (born December 6, 1968) is a Mexican actor and former singer. Formerly known as Héctor Suárez Jr. and Héctor Suárez hijo, he is the son of Héctor Suárez, who was also an actor and of Pepita Gomís a television host.

== Career ==
He was born in Mexico City and started his acting career as part of the cast of the play Vaselina, the Spanish language version of Grease. He immediately obtained a role in the telenovela Principessa on Televisa. Five years later he recorded his first album alternating with his work on television. In 1991 he made his first movie and next year he participated in the film version of the telenovela Alcanzar una estrella, after participating in the telenovela version of it and its sequel.

== Films ==
- One Long Night (2007) .... Felix
- Corazón marchito (2004)
- El tesoro de Clotilde (1994)
- La quebradita (1994) as Víctor
- Más que alcanzar una estrella (1992) as Alejandro
- Tres son peor que una (1992) as Enrique
- Federal de narcóticos (División Cobra) (1991)

=== Talk shows ===
- El pelón de la noche (2004)

== Sitcoms ==
- Diseñador ambos sexos (2001) as Juan Felipe Martínez 'Jean Phillipe Martin'
- Salud, dinero y amor (1997) as El Tacubayo

== Telenovelas ==
=== Imagen Television ===
- Muy padres (2017) as Ricardo Pérez Valdez

=== TV Azteca ===
- Amor sin Condiciones (2006) as Braulio
- Mirada de mujer: El regreso (2003)

=== Televisa ===
- Por Siempre mi Amor (2013) as Fernando
- Como dice el dicho (2013) as Federico
- Carita de ángel (2000) as Omar Gasca
- Infierno en el Paraíso (1999) as Ricardo Selma
- Preciosa (1998) as Lorenzo 'Pantera' Ortiz
- El premio mayor (1995) as El Tacubayo
- Sueño de amor (1993)
- Alcanzar una estrella II (1991) as Pedro
- Alcanzar una estrella (1990) as Pedro
- Mi segunda madre (1989)
- Un nuevo amanecer (1988) as Pavo
- Principessa (1984)

=== Telemundo ===
- 'Til Jail Do Us Part (2022) as Alberto
- 100 días para enamorarnos (2020–2021) as Luis Casas
- Betty en NY (2019) as Hugo Lombardi
- Zorro: La Espada y la Rosa (2007) as Capitán Anibal Pizarro
- El Juramento (2008)

== Theater ==
- P.D. Tu gato ha muerto ("P.S. Your Cat Is Dead")
- Vaselina ("Grease", 1984) as Ricky Rockero

== Albums ==
- Con Ganas de Amar (1991)
- Quiero Todo de Ti (1989)
