= Dos mujeres, un camino =

- Genre: Telenovela
- Written by: Emilio Larrosa; Alejandro Pohlenz; Verónica Suárez
- Directed by: José Ángel García; Salvador Garcini; Alfredo Gurrola; Antonio Acevedo
- Starring: Erik Estrada; Laura León; Enrique Rocha; Bibi Gaytán
- Music by: David Rojo
- Opening theme: "Dos mujeres, un camino" performed by Laura León
- Ending theme: "Dos mujeres, un camino" performed by Grupo Bronco
- Country of origin: Mexico
- Original language: Spanish
- No. of seasons: 1
- No. of episodes: 229

Production
- Executive producer: Emilio Larrosa
- Producer: José Ángel García
- Cinematography: Antonio Acevedo
- Editors: Adrián Frutos; Juan Franco
- Camera setup: Multi-camera
- Production company: Televisa

Original release
- Network: Canal de las Estrellas
- Release: August 16, 1993 – July 1, 1994

Dos mujeres, un camino (English title: Two Women, One Path) is a Mexican neo-noir telenovela produced by Emilio Larrosa for Televisa in 1993–1994. This production was exhibited in 47 countries, including Indonesia, had high viewer ratings, and has been described as one of Televisa's most successful telenovelas.

Erik Estrada, Laura León, and Bibi Gaytán starred as the protagonists, while Enrique Rocha, Claudio Báez, Luz María Jerez, Elizabeth Dupeyrón, Lorena Herrera, Eduardo Liceaga, and Rodrigo Vidal starred as the antagonists. Tejano singer Selena appeared in two episodes.

== Plot ==
The series tells the story of Juan Daniel, known as Johnny, a U.S.-born Mexican truck driver and family man who falls in love with a woman he meets in his travels, and of the complications as a consequence of his new love. Dos Mujeres... used the then-new North American Free Trade Agreement (NAFTA) as a backdrop to the story; Johnny transported merchandise from Mexico to the United States.

Johnny had enemies in Tijuana, where he was blamed for the death of Bernardo Montegarza (Eduardo Liceaga), son of the Montegarza family. Johnny is still very much in love with his wife (Laura León) when he falls for a young waitress, Tanya (Bibi Gaytán), whose mother owns a restaurant that Johnny frequents.

Tanya does not know he is married, and Raymundo, a police officer in love with Tanya, is working with fellow officer Ángel to pursue the head of the family that blames Johnny for the young man's death. It is later discovered that Johnny did not cause Bernardo's death (his own sister Alejandra, who was secretly in love with Johnny, had sabotaged a truck thinking that Johnny would use it), and while he was struggling to decide whether he wants to stay with his wife or his girlfriend, Tanya dies taking a knife thrust intended for her rival – Johnny's wife – Ana Maria.

A side story involves Tanya's friend Graciela being pursued by Bernardo's younger brother Ricardo, and egged on by her mother, but preferring Ángel, who along with Raymundo are pursuing a drug trafficker known simply as Medusa, who turns out to be Bernardo, who was taken in by a drug cartel and changed his identity. Graciela becomes pregnant with Ricardo's child, but she begins to like Ángel more as a potential husband. It is also revealed that Tanya's real father was in fact Ismael Montegarza, patriarch of the Montegarza family and father of Bernardo, Alejandra and Ricardo; Ismael refuses to have anything to do with Bernardo after realizing what he had been doing, and decides to support Ricardo, the only son who was truly loyal to him.

Johnny and Ana Maria seem to reconcile after Tanya's death. The final scene shows the couple retiring for the evening; Johnny, however, in the middle of the night, has a nightmare about Tanya's death, and calls her name in his sleep. When he awakes in the morning, Ana Maria and the children are gone, but in a letter, she promises that he will see the children, but not her.

== Cast ==
=== Main ===
- Erik Estrada as Juan Daniel "Johnny" Villegas
- Laura León as Ana María Romero de Villegas
- Bibi Gaytán as Tania García Pérez / Tania Montegarza Pérez

=== Supporting ===
- Enrique Rocha† as Don Ismael Montegarza
- Luz María Jerez as Alejandra Montegarza Almonte
- Elizabeth Dupeyrón as Amalia Núñez de Toruño
- Claudio Báez† as Enrique Iliades
- José Flores (1957-1997) as Emiliano
- Rodrigo Vidal as Ricardo "Richi" Montegarza Almonte
- Itatí Cantoral as Graciela Toruño Nuñez / Graciela Torres Nuñez
- Roberto Palazuelos as Raymundo Soto #1
- Sergio Sendel as Raymundo Soto #2
- Juan Carlos Casasola as Leobardo
- María Clara Zurita as Elena Pérez de García
- Mario Sauret as Agustín García Ordoñez
- Jorge Salinas as Ángel Lascuraín
- Francisco Huerdo as Guillermo "Memo" Villegas Romero
- Carlos Miguel as Cristóbal Platas
- Gabriela Platas as Paola Iliades
- Members of Grupo Bronco as Themselves
- Lorena Herrera as Lorena Arau Bermúdez

=== Recurring ===
- Hugo Macías Macotela as El Comanche
- Roberto Tello as Odilón
- Salvador Garcini as Roberto Toruño / Roberto Torres
- Eduardo Liceaga as Bernardo Montegarza Almonte "Medusa"
- Marina Marín as Lucrecia Almonte de Montegarza
- Anadela as Anadela
- Monica Dossetti as Alicia
- Horacio Almada as Homero
- Queta Carrasco† as "Grandmother Drugdealer"
- Magdalena Cabrera as Silvia
- José Antonio Iturriaga as Armando
- Oyuki Manjarrez as Lupita
- Jorge Becerril as "El Diablo"
- Rodolfo de Alejandre as Lucas
- Silvia Valdez as Dominga
- Alfredo Alonso as Gerente
- Rodrigo Ruiz as Freddy
- Magdalena Cabrera as Shirley
- Sussan Taunton as Susana
- Yaxkin Santalucía as Arturo
- Amparo Garrido as Bertha
- Rodolfo Velez as Germán*
- Selena† as herself
- Gustavo Aguilar "Manotas"
- Alfonso Kafiti as Commander Sergio Buenrostro
- Jaime Puga as Commander Camilo Martínez
- Carlos Bonavides as himself
- Carlos González as "El Toro"
- Miguel "El Piojo" Herrera as himself
- Juan Raúl Hernández
- Isadora González
- Guillermo Iván
- Rodrigo Zurita
- Rodrigo de la Colina
- Carlos Osiris
- Raúl Ruíz
- Ángeles Yáñez
- Félix Córdova

== Awards ==
Year	Award	Category	Nominee	Result
1994	12th TVyNovelas Awards	Best Telenovela of the Year	Emilio Larrosa	Nominated
1994	12th TVyNovelas Awards	Best Antagonist Actor	Enrique Rocha	Nominated
1994	12th TVyNovelas Awards	Best Leading Actor	Enrique Rocha	Won
1994	12th TVyNovelas Awards	Best Young Lead Actress	Itatí Cantoral	Nominated
1994	12th TVyNovelas Awards	Best Young Lead Actor	Rodrigo Vidal	Won
