= Susana Palazuelos =

Mexican chef and cookery writer

Palazuelos in 2009

Susana Palazuelos Rosenzweig (born c. 10 December, 1944), is a Mexican well-known chef and wedding organizer. She is also a book writer, having written cook books such as "Mexico the Beautiful: Authentic Recipes from the Regions of Mexico" and "Mexican Favorites".

In 1977, Palazuelos opened a restaurant in her native Acapulco, named "Banquetes Susana Palazuelos". She is the owner and general director of the restaurant.

During her career, Palazuelos, considered by some to be the creator of outdoor weddings in Mexico, has cooked for royalty, including the king of Malaysia and Queen Elizabeth II.

Susana has a son, Eduardo Palazuelos, a chef from Mexico and the owner of the restaurants Zibu (Acapulco) and Mar del Zur (Monterrey).

She is the aunt of famous actor Roberto Palazuelos, who considers her to be his real mother, as she raised him.
