= Mónica Dossetti =

Mexican actress

- Born: Mónica Dossetti Merlo; Tlaxcala City, Tlaxcala

Mónica Dossetti Merlo is a Mexican actress. She made her debut as an actress as the rich and socialite Karla Greta Reyes Retana y de las Altas Torres in Volver a Empezar, role which she had reprised in El Premio Mayor and Salud, Dinero y Amor.

== Telenovelas ==
Year	Title	Character	Note
2012	Porque el amor manda	Cassandra	
2009	Camaleones	Señora de Díaz	Supporting Role
2006	La Verdad Oculta	Zaida Castellanos	Supporting Role
2003	Velo de novia	Francisca Rivero	Supporting Role
2002	Así son ellas	Ivette Molina	Supporting Role
2002	Las vías del amor	Molina Mariela Andrade Molina	Supporting Role
2002	Cómplices al rescate	Sonia	
2001	La Intrusa	Silvana Palacios	Supporting Role
2001	Mujer bonita	Sandra	
2000	Carita de ángel	Lorena Campos	Supporting Role
2000	Siempre te amaré	Rossana Banderas	Supporting Role
1999	Serafín	Edith	Main Antagonist
1998	Soñadoras	Vanessa	Supporting Role
1997	Salud, dinero y amor	Karla Greta Reyes Retana y de las Altas Torres	Supporting Role
1995	El premio mayor	Karla Greta Reyes Retana y de las Altas Torres	Supporting Role
1994	Volver a empezar	Karla Greta Reyes Retana y de las Altas Torres	Supporting Role
1993	Dos mujeres, un camino	Alicia	Minor Role
