= Lorena Herrera =

Mexican singer and actress

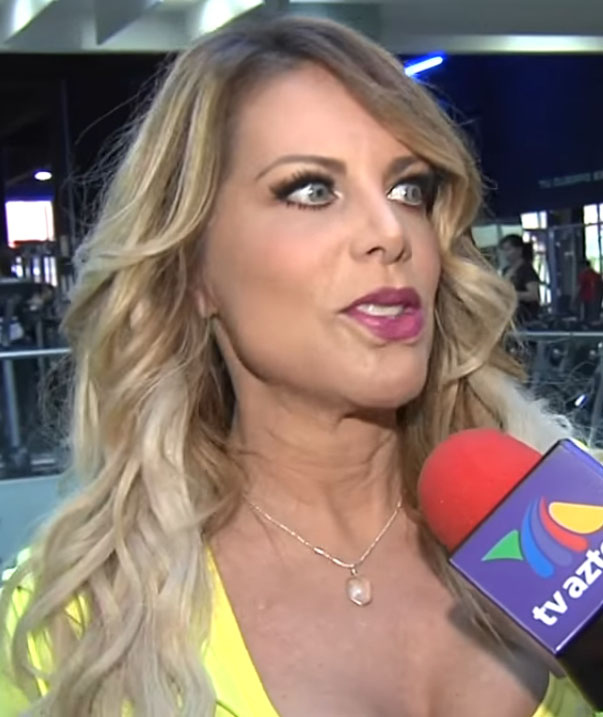
- Lorena in 2018
- Born: Lorena Herrera de la Vega; Mazatlán, Sinaloa, Mexico
- Occupations: Actress; singer
- Years active: 1991–present
- Spouse: Roberto Assad (m. 2007)

Lorena Herrera de la Vega (born in Mazatlán, Sinaloa, Mexico), known professionally as Lorena Herrera, is a Mexican singer and actress.

== Biography ==
Lorena was born in Mazatlán, Sinaloa, Mexico, and later moved with her family to Mexico City. She began her fashion modeling career there and quickly achieved success in Mexico, gaining international recognition by appearing in advertising campaigns across Mexico and South America. As a model, she won the "Look of the Year" contest in Mexico.

Following her modeling career, Lorena began working in Mexico's low-budget film industry. She has appeared in more than seventy-five films and also started her career in telenovelas.

In addition to acting, she has released six music albums, including five studio albums and one remix album titled Soy (Remix), released in 1997.

For her contributions to the film industry, recording industry, and television, Lorena Herrera's handprints were embedded in the Paseo de las Luminarias in 2012.

== Soap opera ==
Lorena Herrera met producer Emilio Larrosa, who had Televisa connections, who gave her a chance to star in his 1991 telenovela production Muchachitas ("Young Girls"), which was a huge hit across Latin America.

She was then hired to participate in the mega-hit telenovela Dos Mujeres, un Camino, where she played the mistress of a villain.

Herrera has since acted in many other telenovelas, including El Premio Mayor. She is also a singer, having released various Mexican music CDs and toured Mexico and the United States. She has been approached by Playboy Mexico to pose nude for that magazine (she appeared in the Mexican Playboy in the December 1987 issue, under the name "Bárbara Ferrat"). She has also released various calendars in which she assumed sensual poses, and she posed naked for Playboy again in March 2011 at 44 years of age.

On the Univision show El Gordo y la Flaca, Lorena shared a bathtub with "El Gordo", Raul De Molina.

She worked as the evil stepmother of Lola (Monserrat) in Lola...Erase Una Vez. She is the mother of Grettell Valdez which interprets Carlota in Lola and she is also the mother of Zoraida Gomez in the soap opera Lola.

She has said that she likes singing, but acting is her favorite activity.

She has worked with Carla Estrada, Emilio Larosa, Pedro Damian and other producers.

She said recently on the Mentiras y Verdades show that she did not like to make novelas with Emilio Larrosa after El Premio Mayor told her that her part was going to be the antagonist.

=== Telenovelas ===
Year	Title	Character	Note
2019	Un poquito tuyo	Catalina de Solano	Antagonist
2015	Amores con trampa	La Pantera	Co-Antagonist
2010	Niña de mi Corazon	Silvana Quinto de Gasca	Main Antagonist
2009	Atrévete a soñar	Maestra	Special Appearance
2009	Verano de Amor	Señora	Special Appearance
2007-2008	Lola...Erase una vez	Monserrat Torres-Oviedo de Santo Domingo	Main Antagonist
2004	Amy, la niña de la mochila azul	Leonora Rivas	Main Antagonist
2000	Mi destino eres tú	Olga Ramos Moret	Antagonist
1997-1998	Maria Isabel	Lucrecia Fontaner	Main Antagonist
1995-1996	El premio mayor	Antonia Fernández de Domensain	Main Antagonist
1993-1994	Dos mujeres, un camino	Lorena Bermudez	Antagonist
1993	Entre la vida y la muerte	Jéssica	Supporting Role
1991-1992	Muchachitas	Claudia Villaseñor	Antagonist

== Filmography ==
- 1990 Justiciero callejero
- 1993 Amargo destino
- 2022 Siempre Reinas

seasons 1 lead

- 2023 Siempre Reinas

Season 2 lead

== Discography ==
Soy (1996)

1. "Tri Tri"
2. "Soy"
3. "Olvidate"
4. "Los Pecados De Amor" (Single)
5. "Oh Yeah!"
6. "Pim Pam Pum"
7. "Esa Soy Yo"
8. "Corazonadas"
9. "Yo Vivire"
10. "Soy Remix"

Soy Remix (1997)

Desnudame El Alma (2000)

1. "Ritmo Tequila"
2. "Nunca Dejaré de Amarte"
3. "Desnudame El Alma"
4. "Despacito"
5. "Dame Amor"
6. "Sienteme"
7. "Eo Deséo"
8. "Más Allá Del Mómento"
9. "El Amor Que No Tiene Rival"
10. "Los Magos de La Noche"

Sobrevivire (2003)

1. "Sobreviviré"
2. "Que Culpa Tengo Yo"
3. "Dejame"
4. "Mi Amor Por Ti"
5. "Como La Flor"
6. "Eres Mi Todo"
7. "Que No Quede Huella"
8. "De Que Me Sirve"
9. "Obsesion"
10. "Abrazame"
11. "Abrazame (Jota Remix)"

Aqui Estoy (2005)

1. "Aquí Estoy"
2. "Déjame"
3. "Amame"
4. "Abrazando Tu Recuerdo"
5. "Oro Molido"
6. "Callaré"
7. "Vamos a Darnos Tiempo"
8. "Envidia Me Da"
9. "Recuerdos"
10. "Baila Mi Ritmo"

Desnudame El Alma (2009)

1. "Desnudame El Alma"
2. "Gritaremos Ante el Mundo"
3. "Chica Espacial"
4. "Sobredosis"
5. "Ya"
6. "Sexy Lover"
7. "Sexy"
8. "Dame Amor [Version en Espanol]"
9. "Solo Quiero"
10. "Dentro de Ti"

Masoquista Single (2015)

Flash Single (2015)

1. "Flash (Versión Original)"
2. "Flash (Versión NEIKO)"

Plastik Single (2016)

Karma Single (2016)

1. "Karma"
2. "Soy (Versión 2016)"

FREAK Single (2017)

TÓCAME Single (2018)

SOY LA MÁS Single (2018)
