= La risa en vacaciones =

Mexican comedy film series

La risa en vacaciones is a Mexican comedy film series that has spawned eight sequels. The movies are popular in Mexico, Latin America and among the Hispanics of the United States.

La risa en vacaciones (Laughter on vacations) are movies where non-actors unwillingly participate. There are hidden cameras filming as people, mainly tourists, fall prey to pranks. These people, usually tourists, then have to sign a paper authorizing for their images to be used for the movie. Usually, the movies are shot in hotels, airports and fishing areas in Acapulco, Cancún or Cabo San Lucas, among other destinations. Three famous Mexican actors, who are identified in the movie only as "Pedro", "Pablo" and "Paco", appear in the movie as the pranksters.

Typical movie jokes usually involve the actors putting balloons on an unsuspecting woman's dress, causing the back of the dress to flip up once she leaves her seat, or turning a public telephone upside down when a person is using it, making a toilet in a public restroom throw water back at the user, delivering the wrong food to a client at a hotel's restaurant, telling awaiting passengers at an airport that their airplane has been designed to arrive at a different terminal, then have the passengers go back to their original terminal after announcing there has been "another change" and the plane will arrive in the same terminal they had been originally told to wait at, or Pedro pretending to be a homosexual and entering a men's restroom where he would tell other men how much he admires their private parts.
