= El premio mayor =

Mexican telenovela

- Genre: Telenovela
- Written by: Emilio Larrosa; Verónica Suárez; Alejandro Pohlenz
- Directed by: Salvador Garcini; Carlos Suárez; Carlos Miguel
- Starring: Carlos Bonavides; Laura León; Sasha Sokol; Sergio Goyri; Claudio Báez; Marcelo Buquet
- Opening theme: "El premio mayor" by Laura León
- Ending theme: "Mi premio mayor" by Sasha Sokol
- Country of origin: Mexico
- Original language: Spanish (1995-1996)
- No. of episodes: 190

Production
- Executive producer: Emilio Larrosa
- Cinematography: José Luis Gómez Alegría
- Production company: Televisa

Original release
- Network: Canal de las Estrellas
- Release: September 4, 1995 – May 24, 1996

Related
- Bajo un mismo rostro; Morir dos veces

El premio mayor, is a Mexican telenovela produced by Emilio Larrosa and written by Verónica Suárez and Alejandro Pohlenz.

Carlos Bonavides, Laura León, Sasha Sokol and Sergio Goyri star as the main protagonists, while Claudio Báez, Lorena Herrera, Martha Julia and Rodrigo Vidal as the main antagonists.

== Plot ==
Huicho Domínguez (Carlos Bonavides), an uneducated, womanizing family man with two children in working-class Mexico, wins the grand prize jackpot ("el premio mayor") in the national lottery. He and his family subsequently move into a large mansion and attempt to adjust to the newfound fame and customs associated with the upper class. Huicho begins to fill his mansion with flamboyant tacky items, and wastes his money shamelessly. The arc of the storyline revolves around him finding a way to balance the seductive aura of his recent wealth - and the beautiful gold-diggers that appear in his life - with not losing the love of his life, his wife Rebeca (Laura Leon).

Alongside them is Rosario (Sasha Sokol), a good and noble girl who was adopted by Rebeca and Huicho. She is humiliated and mistreated by Huicho and his two children; however, Rebecca is good and sweet towards her and considers her as her own daughter. Rosario has a boyfriend, (Rodrigo Vidal) Diego, who seems to be the ideal man who loves her too; however, he ends up becoming a villain when his boss, Jorge (Sergio Goyri), an unlucky journalist, falls for Rosario too.

The new, rich Huicho begins using his money to attract women and have numerous affairs with the support of his oldest son, Luis Gerardo (Sergio Sendel), who has always been interested in Rosario and becomes another obstacle between her and Jorge, who has two siblings, Lorenzo (Marcelo Buquet) and Sergio (Claudio Báez). Lorenzo is noble and supports the relationship between Rosario and his brother, while Sergio is evil and jealous of Lorenzo. Together with his sister-in-law and mistress Antonia (Lorena Herrera), who is Lorenzo's wife, and Sergio's daughter Deborah (Sussan Taunton), they are responsible for countless misdeeds, including making Jorge lose his family.

When Huicho's affairs come to light, mainly due to the sensual and interested Consuelo (Martha Julia), Lorenzo admits his own feelings for Rebeca, leading to devastating family conflicts that will shake the protagonists' faith in money as the solution to their problems.

== Cast ==
- Carlos Bonavides as Luis "Huicho" Domínguez
- Laura León as Rebeca Molina de Domínguez
- Sasha Sokol as Rosario 'Charo' Domínguez
- Sergio Goyri as Jorge Domensain
- Lorena Herrera as Antonia Fernández de Domensain / Amelia de Bausate / Florencia de Robledo / Roberta de Reyes Retana / Isabel Villagrán
- Claudio Báez as Sergio Domensain
- Luz María Jerez as Cristina Molina
- Sergio Sendel as Luis Gerardo Domínguez
- Rodrigo Vidal as Diego Rodríguez
- Martha Julia as Consuelo Flores
- José Ángel García as Esteban Mirélez
- Marcelo Buquet as Lorenzo Domensain
- Sussan Taunton as Déborah Domensain
- Leonor Llausás as Doña Anita López de Domínguez
- Yaxkin Santalucía as Pepe Domínguez
- Diego Luna as Quique Domínguez
- Elsa Navarrete as Concepción 'Conchita' Domínguez
- Irina Areu as Tracy Smith
- Gabriela Araujo as Patricia Molina
- Magdalena Cabrera as Fulgencia Pérez
- Mónica Dossetti as Karla Greta Reyes Retana y de las Altas Torres
- Héctor Suárez Gomis as Gabriel Robledo
- Yolanda Ciani as Gladis
- Roberto Tello as El Carnicero/ Ángel Gómez
- Sergio DeFassio as Cosme Gutiérrez / Demetrio Iregaray de Fuentes y Mares
- Ricardo Silva as Agustín Villagrán
- Carlos Durán as Don Federico Estrada
- Antonio Escobar as Rodrigo
- Lorena Tassinari as Reyna Sánchez (#1)
- Gabriela Arroyo as Reyna Sánchez (#2)
- Patricia Álvarez as Mimí
- José Luis Rojas as Hipólito 'Cachito'
- Anghel as Etelvina
- Alfonso Mier y Terán as Tobi Reyes Retana
- Alejandro Villeli as Aristóteles
- Marita de Lara as Pocahontas
- José Antonio Iturriaga as Nemesio
- Anthony Álvarez as El Tiburón
- Perla Encinas as Elizabeth Dominguez Molina
- Laura Forastieri as Irene
- Luis Couturier as Anthony Wilson
- Marina Marín as Bety
- Rodrigo Ruiz as Carlos Fernández
- Rodrigo Abed as Gustavo
- Galilea Montijo as Lilí
- Ramón Valdés Urtiz as Jorgito Domensain
- Marco Antonio Regil as Toño
- Francisco Mendoza as Alex
- Salvador Garcini as Juan
- Vanessa Angers as Gema
- Dinorah Cavazos as Iris
- Annette Cuburu as Tracy
- Jorge Becerril as José Ospina
- Oyuki Manjarrez as Lolita
- Fernando Manzano as El Hidráulico
- Osvaldo Benavides as Chicles
- Zayda Castellón as Pascuala
- Ranferi Negrete as Damián
- Juan Romanca as Comandante Hugo Ortega
- Rodolfo de Alejandre as Pollo
- Sylvia Valdés as Ruperta
- Iván Perea as El Perico / Omar Sánchez
- Mónica Prado as Mamá de Mimí
- Alejandro Avila as Hugo
- Octavio Menduet as Comandante Torres
- Mariana Huerdo as Andrea
- Jonathan as Jonathan
- Archie Lafranco as Daniel
