= Carlos Miguel Suárez =

Mexican actor (died 2026)

Carlos Miguel
- Died: 19 October 2026
- Other name: Poncho
- Occupations: Actor; salesman
- Years active: 1991–2024
- Notable credit(s): Dos Mujeres, un Camino, Tú y yo
- Children: 2

Carlos Miguel Suárez Soto (died 19 October 2026), better known as Carlos Miguel, was a Mexican actor and salesman. In the 1980s and 1990s, he acted in a number of Televisa telenovelas, such as Dos Mujeres, un Camino and Tú y yo, the latter of which perhaps garnered him the most public recognition, for his characterization of "Poncho".

Suárez died on 19 October 2026.

== Kidnapping ==
Suárez was kidnapped in Mexico City and taken to the school where his two daughters studied. They asked his daughters for the time, to show him they had access to them. They had him retained for four days, causing him injuries to his mouth and robbing him of some savings. Following the event, Suárez became a taco salesman at a small corner stand in Mexico City.

== See also ==
- List of Mexicans
- Roberto Tello – his personal friend and collaborator
