= Laura León =

Mexican actress and singer

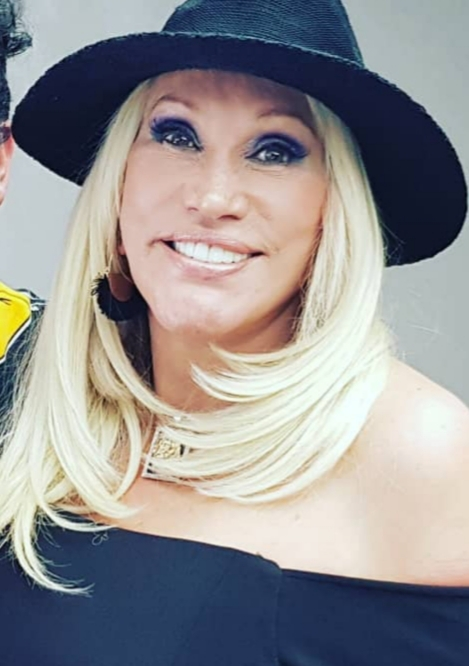
- Born: Rebeca Velderraín Vera; November 24, 1952 (age 73); Comalcalco, Tabasco, Mexico
- Other name: La Tesorito
- Occupations: Actress, singer
- Years active: 1976–present

Laura León (born Rebeca Velderraín Vera on November 24, 1952, in Comalcalco, Tabasco) is a Mexican actress and singer.

== Discography ==
- 1978: La Máquina del Sabor
- 1982: El Fuego del Trópico Hecho Mujer
- 1982: La Tesorito de Oro
- 1982: El Fuego del Tropico Hecho Mujer
- 1984: Ritmo Ardiente
- 1985: Mi Tesorito
- 1987: Laura León con Sabor a...
- 1988: No Me Toques Que Me Rompo
- 1992: El Club de Mujeres Engañadas
- 1993: Tesorito... Baila Conmigo
- 1994: Boleros para el Amor
- 1995: Embajadora de la Cumbia
- 1996: Es el Premio Mayor
- 1998: Laura León
- 1999: Mujeres Engañadas
- 2000: Mi Tesoro Eres Tú
- 2009: Lo Nuevo
- 2011: Yo soy la cumbia

== Filmography ==
Film roles
Year	Title	Roles	Notes
1976	Zona roja		
1979	Tierra sangrienta	Lucy	
1981	Noche de juerga	Singer at bar	
1981	Lagunilla, mi barrio		

Television roles
Year	Title	Roles	Notes	Ref(s)
1976	Mundos Opuestos	Unknown role		
1982	El amor nunca muere	Azucena		
1988	Amor en silencio	Alejandra		
1991	Muchachitas	Esther Pérez de Olivares	TVyNovelas Award for Best Co-lead Actress	
1993-1994	Dos mujeres, un camino	Ana María de Villegas		
1995-1996	El premio mayor	Rebeca Molina de Domínguez		
1999-2000	Mujeres engañadas	Yolanda Jiménez		
2005-2006	Señora León	Herself	Host	
2007	Muchachitas como tú	Carmen Márquez		
2011	Dos hogares	Refugio Urbina		
2021	El juego de las llaves	Gloria		
