= Michelle Vieth =

Mexican actress

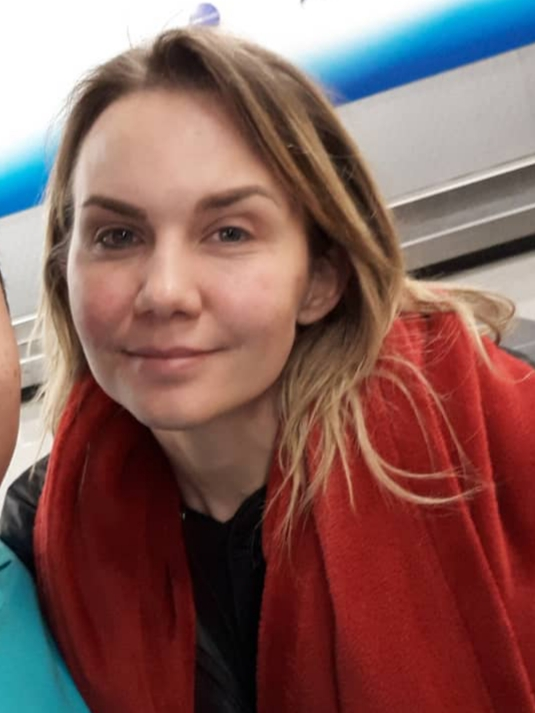
- Vieth in 2020
- Born: Acapulco
- Citizenship: American; Mexican
- Occupations: Actress; presenter
- Years active: 1995–present
- Spouse: Héctor Soberón (2002-2004)
- Partners: Leandro Ampudia (2004-2010); Christian Aparicio (2011-2019)
- Children: 4

Michelle Vieth (Spanish pronunciation: [miˈtʃel βjet]) is an American-Mexican actress and television personality known for her starring roles in Mexican telenovelas between the late 1990s and early 2000s.

== Biography ==
Michelle's mother and father met in Marshalltown, Iowa, United States. Her mother's family lived in Acapulco, Guerrero, Mexico at that time. Her father and his side of the family are from Marshalltown. For that reason, from a young age, Michelle was flying back and forth through both countries. At the age of 15 while in Acapulco, she was invited as an extra in the telenovelas "El Premio Mayor" produced by Emilio Larrosa, "Acapulco, Cuerpo y Alma" produced by Jose Alberto Castro and its English version produced by Carlos Sotomayor. But It was VP of Televisa and Producer Valentín Pimstein's last discovery for the company after discovering figures like Veronica Castro and Thalia. Pimstein saw something unique in Michelle so he took her to Mexico City and his team of specialists, who then decided that Michelle was going to be enrolled at the Centro de Educación Artistica (CEA) to study acting and modeling. Almost a year later, Pedro Damián, who was part of Valentin's team, called her and offered her to be Mi Pequeña Traviesa, marking her debut in television as an actress.

In 2004, she was on Big Brother Celebrity VIP2 Mexico, and exited the fourth week of the show, finishing in 11th place.

== Personal life ==
Vieth was married to Hector Soberon from 2001 to 2004, and the marriage was later annulled. She was engaged but never married to Leandro Ampudia from 2004 to 2010, with whom she had a son, Leandro (born 2005), and a daughter, Michelle (born 2007). Since 2011, she's been in a long-term relationship with Christian Aparicio, and they have a son, Christian Aparicio, Jr. (born 2014), and a daughter, Selika (born 2016).

More than a decade ago, a private video of Vieth surfaced on the internet, a situation that she still considers heartbreaking and difficult to overcome. Vieth supports a citizen initiative that seeks the approval of the Vengeance Pornography Law, to prevent harassment through the network and the circulation of unauthorized sexual content of which she herself was a victim. After living it in her own flesh, Vieth contacted women's rights defender Matan Uziel from Real Women Real Stories, who helped her to tell her story.

== Filmography ==
Telenovelas, Series, Theater, TV Show
Year	Title	Role	Notes
1995-1996	Acapulco, cuerpo y alma		Special appearance
1997-1998	Mi pequeña traviesa	Michelle vieth/ Hector Soberon	Michelle Vieth
1998-1999	Soñadoras	Lucía de la Macorra	Main role
1998	De Estos Locos Quedan Pocos		Theatrical Performance
1998	Mi Preciosa Traviesa		Theatrical Performance
1998	Festival Acapulco	Herself/Presenter	TV show
1999-2000	Mujeres engañadas	Paola Montero	Main role
2001	Amigas y Rivales	Laura González	Main role
2002-2003	Clase 406	Nadia Castillo Bojorquez	Recurring role
2003	Mujer, casos de la vida real		TV series
2003	Un Big Enredo		Theatrical Performance
2004	Copa América	Herself/Presenter	TV special Program
2005	La Madrastra	Viviana Sousa de San Román	Main cast
2006-07	Mundo de Fieras	Karen Farias Rivas del Castillo	Main cast
2006	Emisiones del teleton	Herself/Presenter	TV show
2006	Big Brother VIP 2	Herself	Reality Show-Finished 11th Place
2007-08	Al Diablo con los Guapos	Pilar	Guest star
2008	La traición	Michelle Phillips	Recurring role
2008-09	Cuidado con el Angel	Ana Julia Villaseñor	Recurring role
2012-13	La Otra Cara del Alma	Daniela de la Vega Quijano/Daniela Aldama de la Vega	Main role
2013	La Isla, el reality	Herself	Reality Show-Finished 18th Place
2013	Mexico Baila	Herself	Reality Show
2021-22	Mi fortuna es amarte	Fernanda Diez Acuña	Main cast
2023	Bola de locos	Herself	Episode: "Amigos y rivales"

== Awards and nominations ==
Year	Award	Category	Telenovela	Result
1998	TVyNovelas Awards	Best Female Revelation	Mi Pequeña Traviesa	Nominated
1999	TVyNovelas Awards	Debut of the Year	Mi Pequeña Traviesa	Won
2004	Premios Bravo	Best Actress in Television		Won

Other awards

- Recognition by Career from Government of Acapulco in 2006
- Recognition for Lifetime Achievement from Programa Mueveteb in 2006
- Recognition by the Ministry of Tourism Acapulco and the Trust for Tourism Promotion of Acapulco in 2009
