= Roberto Palazuelos =

Mexican actor (born 1967)

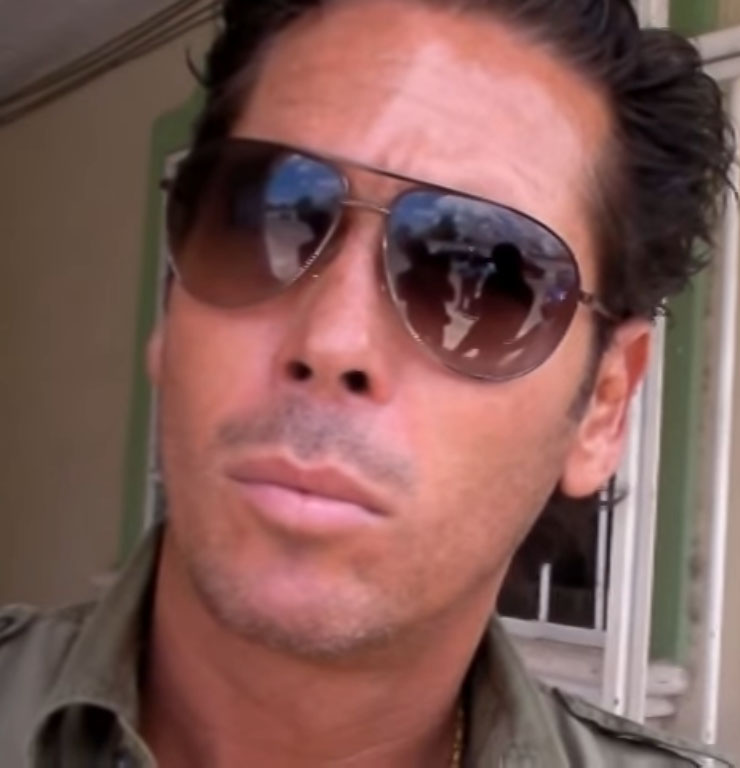
- Born: Roberto Palazuelos Badeaux; January 31, 1967 (age 59); Acapulco, Guerrero, Mexico
- Other name: El Diamante Negro
- Occupations: Actor, producer, model
- Years active: Late 1980s–present
- Children: 1

Roberto Palazuelos Badeaux (born January 31, 1967), better known as Roberto Palazuelos (Spanish pronunciation: [roˈβeɾto palaˈswelos]) or El Diamante Negro ('The Black Diamond'), is a Mexican actor, model, and producer best known for his work in Mexican telenovelas.

== Early life ==
Roberto Palazuelos was born to a Mexican father and a mother of French origin. He is the only child from that relationship, but has five half-siblings.

Palazuelos was raised by his aunt, noted Mexican chef Susana Palazuelos.

His nickname, El Diamante Negro, was given to him by Mexican actor and comedian Omar Chaparro, mixing the name of Palazuelos's hotel, El Diamante K, and his appearance of being overly tanned.

== Television ==
Palazuelos has been known in Mexico since the late 1980s for his work in popular telenovelas such as Mi segunda madre ('My Second Mother') and Simplemente María ('Simply María'). His performance as Roger in the successful teen-oriented Muchachitas ('Girls') propelled him to fame. Dos mujeres, un camino ('Two Women, One Path'), Amada enemiga ('Beloved Enemy'), and Salomé are also among his best known works.

In 2003, Palazuelos was one of the participating personalities of Big Brother Mexico. He also hosted the Mexican reality TV show El Bar Provoca, in 2006.

Palazuelos usually plays the villain in Mexican soap operas. He was featured as an antagonist character in the telenovelas Mañana es para siempre ('Tomorrow is Forever'), Llena de amor ('Filled with Love'), Qué bonito amor ('What a Beautiful Love'), and Hasta el fin del mundo ('Until the End of the World').

== Film ==
Palazuelos's first professional acting gig was in 1988, playing John in Don't Panic.

== Politics ==
Palazuelos Badeaux sought election as one of Quintana Roo's senators in the 2024 Senate election, occupying the first place on the Citizens' Movement's two-name formula. The Citizens' Movement (MC) placed third in the election and, accordingly, neither candidate was elected to Congress.

== Personal life ==
Palazuelos was married to Yadira Garza. Cristian Castro sang the opening song at their wedding reception. Another guest, Pablo Montero, sang Ave Maria during the wedding Mass. They have had one child, named Roberto Palazuelos Jr.

Palazuelos received, both, his Jr. High School and High School certifications and Diploma, when he was already 41 years old. In 2008, Palazuelos went back to college to prepare for a law degree.

Palazuelos owns and runs a bed and breakfast, located in Guerrero. He also owns several hotels in Tulum, Quintana Roo.

On October 15, 2020, he received an honorary doctorate for his artistic work by the Colegio Internacional de Profesionales C&C an organization that operates in a gray area of professional associations that confer honorary titles without formal academic standing, essentially functioning as a recognition society rather than an accredited educational institution.

== Filmography ==
Year	Title	Role	Note
2014–2015	Hasta el fin del mundo	Mauro Renzi	Antagonist
2013	Gossip Girl: Acapulco	Santiago Ochoa "El Capitán"	Supporting Role
2012–2013	Qué bonito amor	Giuliano Rina	Main Antagonist
2011–2012	Una familia con suerte	Michael Robert Anderson	45 episodes
2010–2011	Llena de amor	Mauricio Fonseca	Antagonist
2008–2009	Mañana es para siempre	Camilo Elizalde	Antagonist
2007	Bajo las riendas del amor	Cristian del Valle	Antagonist
2006–2007	La fea más bella	Pedro Barman	Special Appearance
2006	Mi Vida Eres Tú	Aristeo Borgia	Main Antagonist
2004–2005	Apuesta por un amor	Francisco Andrade	Supporting Role
2003	Niña amada mía	Rafael Rincón del Valle	Antagonist
2002–2003	¡Vivan los niños!	Pantaleón Rendon	Supporting Role
2001–2002	Salomé	Beto 'El Figurín'	Antagonist
2000–2001	Carita de ángel	Flavio Romero	Antagonist
1999	Amor Gitano	Claudio	Supporting Role
1997	Amada enemiga	Mauricio	Supporting Role
1996	Para toda la vida	Rolando	Supporting Role
1995	Pobre niña rica	Gregorio	Antagonist
1993	Dos mujeres, un camino	Raymundo Soto #1	Supporting Role
1991–1992	Muchachitas	Roger Guzmán	Protagonist
1989-90	Simplemente María	Pedro Cuevas	Supporting Role
1989	Mi segunda madre	David	Supporting Role

== Sources ==
- Biografías Roberto Palazuelos (in Spanish) Esmas.com Retrieved: 2010-05-10.
