= Anahí discography =

Mexican singer discography

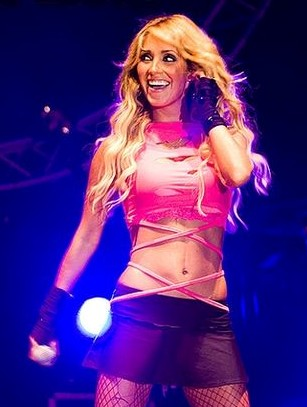
- Anahí during a show in 2008.
- Studio albums: 6
- Extended plays: 1
- Compilation albums: 3
- Singles: 29
- Music videos: 22
- Promotional singles: 10

Mexican singer Anahí has released 6 studio albums, 3 compilation albums, 1 extended play (EP), 29 singles (including 3 as a featured artist), 10 promotional singles and 22 music videos. Before RBD, Anahí released 4 albums. The success of them was more limited, none of them officially charted. She has sold three million albums as a solo artist.

In 2009, she released the album Mi Delirio. The album had a moderate success, selling one million copies worldwide. The first single of the album charted on the US Latin Pop chart. The album was certified gold in Brazil for over 20,000 copies sold.

== Albums ==
=== Studio albums ===
Title	Album details	Peak chart positions					Certifications
Title	Album details	US Latin	US Latin Pop	MEX	SPA	BRA	Certifications
Anahí	Released: March 22, 1993; Label: Discos America; Formats: CD, cassette, LP, digital download	—	—	—	—	—	
¿Hoy Es Mañana?	Released: June 16, 1996; Label: Paramúsica; Formats: CD, cassette, digital download	—	—	—	—	—	
Anclado en Mi Corazón	Released: April 18, 1997; Label: Paramúsica; Formats: CD, cassette, digital download	—	—	—	—	—	
Baby Blue	Released: August 26, 2000; Label: Fonovisa; Formats: CD, cassette, digital download	—	—	—	—	—	
Mi Delirio	Released: November 24, 2009; Label: EMI, Capitol; Formats: CD, LP, digital download	4	2	14	—	7	BRA: Gold
Inesperado	Released: June 3, 2016; Label: EMI; Formats: CD, digital download	17	6	4	77	1	
"—" denotes releases that did not chart or were not released.

=== Compilation albums ===
Title	Album details
Antología	Released: 2005; Label: Fonovisa; Formats: CD, digital download
Una Rebelde en Solitario	Released: July 4, 2006; Label: Fonovisa; Formats: CD, digital download
Antes de Ser Rebelde	Released: 2007; Label: Paramúsica; Formats: CD, digital download

=== EPs ===
Title	EP details
Alérgico (Fan Edition)	Released: November 9, 2010; Label: EMI; Formats: CD, digital download

== Singles ==
=== As lead artist ===
Title	Year	Peak chart positions									Certifications	Album
Title	Year	US Latin Pop Airplay	US Latin Rhythm Songs	US Latin Tropical Songs	MEX Español Airplay	MEX Top Pop Songs	MEX Top General Songs	ARG	CHI	ESP	Certifications	Album
"Corazón de Bombón"	1996	—	—	—	—	—	—	—	—	—		¿Hoy Es Mañana?
"Por Volverte a Ver"	1996	—	—	—	—	—	—	—	—	—		¿Hoy Es Mañana?
"Descontrolándote"	1996	—	—	—	—	—	—	—	—	—		¿Hoy Es Mañana?
"Anclado en Mi Corazón"	1997	—	—	—	—	—	—	—	—	—		Anclado en Mi Corazón
"Escándalo"	1997	—	—	—	—	—	—	—	—	—		Anclado en Mi Corazón
"Salsa Reggae"	1997	—	—	—	—	—	—	—	—	—		Anclado en Mi Corazón
"Primer Amor"	2000	—	—	—	—	—	—	—	—	—		Baby Blue
"Superenamorándome"	2000	—	—	—	—	—	—	—	—	—		Baby Blue
"Desesperadamente Sola"	2001	—	—	—	—	—	—	—	—	—		Baby Blue
"Tu Amor Cayó del Cielo"	2001	—	—	—	—	—	—	—	—	—		Baby Blue
"Mi Delirio"	2009	29	22	—	18	—	—	41	—	—		Mi Delirio
"Me Hipnotizas"	2010	—	—	—	—	7	11	52	64	—		Mi Delirio
"Quiero"	2010	—	—	—	—	—	—	—	—	—		Mi Delirio
"Alérgico" (solo or featuring Renne or Noel Schajris)	2010	—	—	—	—	2	2	63	72	—		Mi Delirio
"Libertad" (with Christian Chávez)	2011	—	—	—	9	—	—	—	—	—		Libertad
"Para Qué"	2011	68	11	—	—	—	43	—	—	18		Mi Delirio
"Dividida"	2011	40	20	—	82	27	—	—	—	12		Non-album single
"Click" (with Bryan Amadeus and Ale Sergi)	2011	—	—	—	7	—	—	—	—	—		Popland! La Música
"Absurda"	2013	—	—	—	—	—	—	—	—	—		Non-album single
"Rumba" (featuring Wisin)	2015	32	23	1	8	4	16	—	—	—	PMB: Gold	Inesperado
"Boom Cha" (featuring Zuzuka Poderosa)	2015	—	—	—	—	—	—	—	—	—		Inesperado
"Eres" (featuring Julión Álvarez)	2016	—	—	—	—	6	—	—	—	—		Inesperado
"Amnesia"	2016	—	—	—	—	—	17	—	—	—		Inesperado
"Latidos"	2020	—	—	—	—	—	—	—	—	—		Non-album single
"Nuestro Amor" (with Moderatto)	2021	—	—	—	—	—	—	—	—	—		Rockea Bien Duro
"Déjame Vivir" (with Juan Gabriel)	2022	—	—	—	—	—	—	—	—	—		Los Dúo, Vol. 3
"—" denotes releases that did not chart or were not released.

=== As featured artist ===
Title	Year	Peak chart positions				Album
Title	Year	US Latin Pop	US Latin Rhythm	MEX	SPA	Album
"El Regalo Más Grande" (Tiziano Ferro featuring Anahí and Dulce María)	2009	—	—	4	—	A Mi Edad
"Bailando Sin Salir de Casa" (Matute featuring Anahí)	2016	—	—	44	—	Poderes de Los Duetos Fantásticos ¡Actívense!
"Me Hipnotizas (Live from Mexico City) [Live]" (MIRUD featuring Anahí)	2026	2	3	11	32	Standalone single

=== Promotional singles ===
Title	Year	Album
"Te Doy un Besito"	1992	Anahí
"Mensajero del Señor"	1993	Anahí
"Juntos" (with Kuno Becker)	2001	Primer Amor a 1000 X Por Hora
"Te Puedo Escuchar"	2009	Mi Delirio
"Él Me Mintió"	2009	Mi Delirio
"Hasta Que Llegues Tú"	2009	Mi Delirio
"Aleph"	2010	Mi Delirio
"Rendirme en Tu Amor" (with Carlos Ponce)	2011	Non-album promotional single
"Están Ahí"	2015	Inesperado
"Siempre Tú"	2016	Inesperado

== Guest appearances ==
Title	Year	Other artist(s)	Album
"Contando Borreguitos"	1986	—N/a	Chiquilladas: Canta Con Sus Amigos
"Bibidi Babidi Bu"	1996	—N/a	Disneymania
"Eres Tan Especial"	1997	—N/a	Disco Amarillo
"Adela"	1999	—N/a	El Diario de Daniela
"Baile de los Muñecos"	1999	—N/a	Ellas Cantan a Cri Cri
"Primer Amor" (Remix)	2001	—N/a	Primer Amor a 1000 X Por Hora
"Por Estar Juntos"	2010	Artists of Televisa	Non-album songs
"Amigo Francisco"	2016	Julión Álvarez	Non-album songs

== Music videos ==
List of music videos, showing year released, other artist(s) credited and director(s)
Title	Year	Other artist(s)	Director(s)	Ref.
As lead artist
"Corazón de Bombón"	1996	None	Rubén Galindo	
"Primer Amor"	2000	None	Pedro Damián	
"Superenamorándome"	2000	None	Fernando de Garay	
"Tu Amor Cayó del Cielo"	2001	None	—N/a	
"Mi Delirio"	2009	None	Max Gutiérrez	
"Me Hipnotizas"	2010	None	Ricardo Moreno	
"Quiero"	2010	None	Ricardo Moreno	
"Alérgico" (Portuguese Version)	2010	Renne	Rafael Kent	
"Alérgico"	2011	Noel Schajris	—N/a	
"Para Qué" (Live)	2011	None	Rafael Kent	
"Libertad"	2011	Christian Chávez	Max Gutiérrez	
"Dividida"	2011	None	David Ruiz "Leche"	
"Click"	2011	Bryan Amadeus and Ale Sergi	Diego Martínez Ulanosky; Giannfranco Quatrini	
"Rumba"	2015	Wisin	Jessy Terrero	
"Boom Cha"	2015	Zuzuka Poderosa	Pablo Croce	
"Amigo Francisco"	2016	Julión Álvarez	—N/a	
"Eres"	2016	Julión Álvarez	Charly Rusansky	
"Amnesia"	2016	None	Pablo Croce	
"Nuestro Amor"	2022	Moderatto	—N/a	
"Déjame Vivir"	2022	Juan Gabriel	Andrea Grain; Caro de Luna	
As featured artist
"El Regalo Más Grande"	2009	Tiziano Ferro featuring Dulce María	Gaetano Morbioli	
"Por Estar Juntos"	2010	Artists of Televisa	—N/a	
