= List of awards and nominations received by Anahí =

Anahí awards and nominations
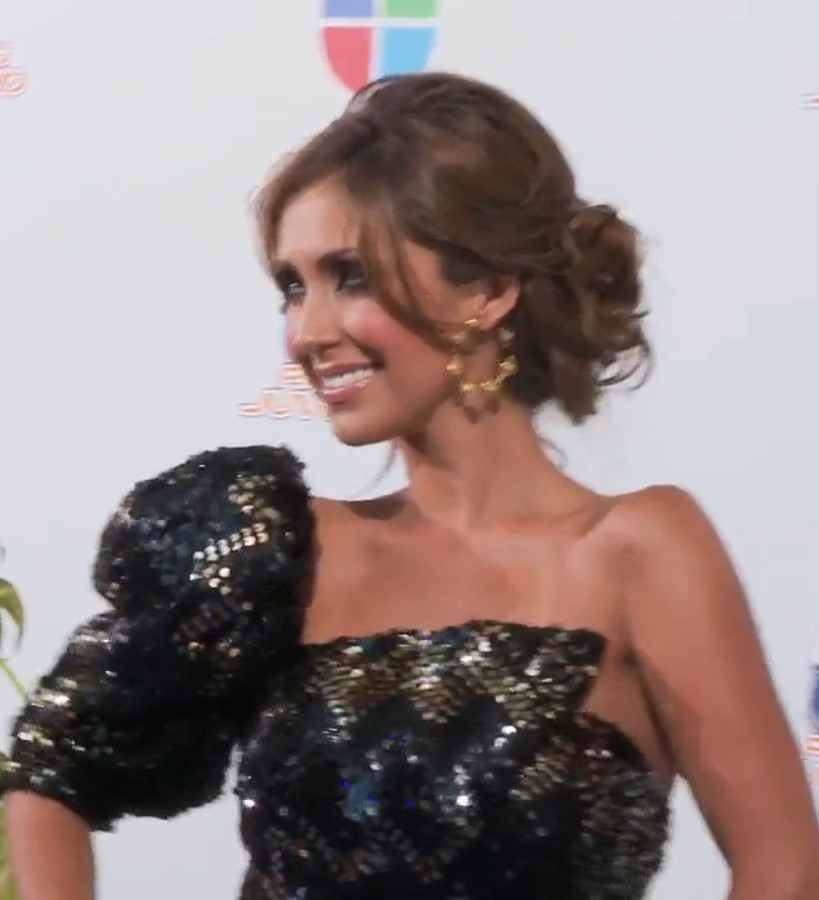
- Anahí at Premios Juventud red carpet in 2009
Awards and nominations
Award	Wins	Nominations

Totals (Note: Certain award groups do not simply award one winner. They acknowledge several different recipients, have runners-up, and have third place. Since this is a specific recognition and is different from losing an award, runner-up mentions are considered wins in this award tally. For simplification and to avoid errors, each award in this list has been presumed to have had a prior nomination.)
- Wins: 41
- Nominations: 102

Anahí is a Mexican singer, songwriter, actress, record producer and dancer.

== Ariel Awards ==
The Ariel Award is the Mexican Academy of Film Award. It has been awarded annually since 1947. The award recognizes excellence in motion picture making, such as acting, directing and screenwriting in Mexican cinema. It is considered the most prestigious award in the Mexican movie industry. Anahí has received one award.

#	Year	Nominated	Category	Result
#1	1991	Había Una Vez Una Estrella	Best Child Performance	Won

== Latin Music Italian Awards ==
#	Year	Nominated	Category	Result
#1	2014	Herself	Artist Saga	Nominated
#2	2015	Herself	Best Latin Female Artist of The Year	Won
#2	2015	Herself	Artist Saga	Won
#2	2015	"Rumba"	Best Latin Female Video of The Year	Won
#2	2015	"Rumba"	Best Latin Collaboration of The Year	Won

== TVyNovelas Awards ==
The TVyNovelas Awards, also known as the Premios TVyNovelas are presented annually by Televisa and the magazine TVyNovelas to honour the best Mexican television productions, especially telenovelas. Anahí received five nominations and one win.

#	Year	Nominated	Category	Result
#1	2000	Mujeres engañadas	Best Revelation	Won
#2	2001	Primer Amor - A Mil Por Hora	Best Lead Actress	Nominated
#3	2006	Rebelde	Best Young Lead Actress	Nominated
#4	2012	Dos Hogares	Best Lead Actress	Nominated
#5	2012	"Rendirme En Tu Amor" (with Carlos Ponce)	Best Musical Theme	Nominated

== Billboard Music Video Award ==
The Billboard Music Video Awards are sponsored by Billboard magazine to honor artists and their music videos. Anahí has received one nomination.

#	Year	Nominated	Category	Result
#1	2000	Primer Amor	Best New Artist Clip of the Year	Nominated

== OTTI Awards ==
#	Year	Nominated	Category	Result
#1	1991	Primer Amor - A Mil Por Hora	Best Stellar Performance	Won

== Palme d'Or Awards ==
#	Year	Nominated	Category	Result
#1	1991	Anahí	Children Artistic Career	Won
#2	2000	Anahí	Palma de Oro	Won

== Eres Awards ==
Anahi has received one award.

#	Year	Nominated	Category	Result
#1	2001	Primer Amor - A Mil Por Hora	Best Young Performance Stellar Female	Won

== G1 Globo Awards ==
Made by globo.com Brazilian portal launched in 2000, and belongs to the company Organizações Globo, Anahi won by the election of the public with his album "Mi Delirio" in 2009.

#	Year	Nominated	Category	Result
#1	2009	Mi Delirio	Album of the Year	Won

== Galardon a los Grandes Awards ==
Created by Raul Velasco, the program Siempre en Domingo. Anahí has received one nomination.

#	Year	Nominated	Category	Result
#1	2010	Anahí	Pop Female Artist of the Moment	Nominated

== Nickelodeon ==
The Nickelodeon Kids' Choice Awards is an annual awards show, that honors the year's biggest television, movie, and music acts, as voted by the people.

=== Argentina Kids' Choice Awards ===
The Kids' Choice Awards Argentina were established in 2011. Anahí has received one nomination.

#	Year	Nominated	Category	Result
#1	2011	Anahí	Favorite Latin Artist	Nominated

=== Mexico Kids' Choice Awards ===
Mexico Kids' Choice Awards, also known as Mis Prémios Nick, were established in 2010. Anahí has received two awards from five nominations.

#	Year	Nominated	Category	Result
#1	2010	Anahí	Favorite Artist or Band	Won
#2	2010	Anahí	Favorite Look	Won
#3	2010	"Mi Delirio"	Favorite Song	Nominated
#4	2012	Dos Hogares	Favorite Actress	Nominated
#5	2013	Anahí	Favorite Twitterer	Nominated
#6	2016	Anahí	Chica Trendy	Won

== Orgullosamente Latino Awards ==
Orgullosamente Latino Awards is the Latino awards organised by the Ritmoson Latino. The show has been held annually since 2004 and is voted on by the general public. Anahí has received one award from four nominations.

#	Year	Nominated	Category	Result
#1	2010	Anahí	Latin Solo Artist of The Year	Nominated
#2	2010	"Me Hipnotizas"	Latin Song of the Year	Won
#3	2010	Mi Delirio	Latin Record of the Year	Nominated
#4	2010	"Mi Delirio"	Latin Video of the Year	Nominated

== Arlequin Awards ==
Anahi award received by his artistic career in Mexico.

#	Year	Nominated	Category	Result
#1	2011	Anahí	Artistic Trajectory	Won

== E! Entertainment Awards ==
Anahí has received one award.

#	Year	Nominated	Category	Result
#1	2011	Anahí	Celebrity of The Year	Won

== People en Español Awards ==
People en Español Awards is a music award granted every year by the magazine People en Español. Anahí has received three awards from eight nominations.

#	Year	Nominated	Category	Result
#1	2010	Anahí	Best Singer / Pop Group	Nominated
#2	2010	Mi Delirio	Best Album	Nominated
#3	2010	"Mi Delirio"	Best Song of The Year	Nominated
#4	2010	Anahí	Best Hairstyle of the Year	Won
#5	2011	Anahí	Best Singer / Pop Group	Won
#6	2011	"Libertad" (with Christian Chávez)	Video of the Year	Won
#7	2012	Anahí	Queen of Twitter	Nominated
#8	2013	Anahí and Manuel Velasco	The Couple More Social	Nominated
#9	2014	Anahí	Selfie of Year	Won

== Prêmio Febreteen ==
#	Year	Nominated	Category	Result
#1	2016	"Rumba"	Melhor Clipe Internacional	Won

== Premios Juventud ==
The Premios Juventud is an awards show for Spanish-speaking celebrities in the areas of film, music, sports, fashion, and pop culture, presented by the television network Univision. Anahí has received twenty seven nominations.

#	Year	Nominated	Category	Result
#1	2005	Anahí	She's Got Style	Nominated
#2	2005	Anahí	Girl of my Dreams	Nominated
#3	2006	Anahí	She's Got Style	Nominated
#4	2006	Anahí	Girl of my Dreams	Nominated
#5	2007	Anahí	Best Moves!	Nominated
#6	2007	Anahí	She's Got Style	Nominated
#7	2007	Anahí	Girl of my Dreams	Nominated
#8	2007	Anahí	My Idol Is...	Nominated
#9	2007	Anahí	In The spotlight of Paparazzi	Nominated
#10	2008	Anahí	She's Got Style	Nominated
#11	2008	Anahí	Girl of my Dreams	Nominated
#12	2008	Anahí	My Idol Is...	Nominated
#13	2009	Anahí	Girl of my Dreams	Nominated
#14	2009	Anahí	My Idol Is...	Nominated
#15	2009	Anahí	She's Got Style	Nominated
#16	2009	"El Regalo Más Grande" (feat. Tiziano Ferro and Dulce María)	The Perfect Combination	Nominated
#17	2009	Anahí	In the spotlight of Paparazzi	Nominated
#18	2009	Anahí and Rodrigo Ruiz de Teresa	Hottest Romance	Nominated
#19	2010	Anahí	Best Moves!	Nominated
#20	2010	"Mi Delirio"	Catchiest Tune	Nominated
#21	2010	"Mi Delirio"	My Favorite Video	Nominated
#22	2010	"Mi Delirio"	My Ringtone	Nominated
#23	2010	Mi Delirio	CD to Die For	Nominated
#24	2010	Anahí	Pop Artist	Nominated
#25	2010	Anahí	My Idol Is...	Nominated
#26	2010	Anahí	In the Spotlight of Paparazzi	Nominated
#27	2010	Anahí	Girl of my Dreams	Nominated
#28	2011	"Alérgico"	Ballad	Nominated
#29	2011	Anahí	Follow me The Good	Nominated
#30	2012	"Dividida"	Best Theme Novelero	Nominated
#31	2012	Anahí	Follow me The Good	Nominated
#32	2012	Dos Hogares	Girl of my Dreams	Nominated
#33	2016	"Rumba" (feat. Wisin)	The Perfect Combination	Nominated
#34	2016	"Rumba" (feat. Wisin)	Catchiest Tune	Nominated
#35	2016	"Eres" (feat. Julión Álvarez)	Best Ballad	Nominated
#36	2016	Anahí	Voice of the Moment	Nominated
#37	2016	Anahí	Pop-rock Artist	Nominated

== Quiero Awards ==
Anahí has received one nomination.

#	Year	Nominated	Category	Result
#1	2011	"Mi Delirio"	Best Female Video Artist	Nominated

== Red Diez Social Awards ==
Anahí has received two awards.

#	Year	Nominated	Category	Result
#1	2011	Anahí	The Most Influential	Won
#2	2011	Anahí	Female Artist	Won

== Telehit Awards ==
Telehit Awards is the Latino awards organised by the Telehit. Anahí has received one nomination.

#	Year	Nominated	Category	Result
#1	2010	Anahí	Young Artist of the Year	Nominated

== Texas Awards ==
Texas Awards is an annual awards show for Spanish-speaking celebrities that honors the year's biggest music acts. Anahí has received two nomination.

#	Year	Nominated	Category	Result
#1	2011	Anahí	Best Rock-Pop Artist	Nominated
#2	2012	Anahí	Best Rock-Pop Artist	Nominated

== Top TVZ Awards ==
Top TVZ Awards are organised by the program TVZ, Brazil. This trophy is to reward the top 10 national and international singers.

#	Year	Nominated	Category	Result
#1	2010	Anahí	Trofeo TVZ	Won

== Tu Mundo Awards ==
The "Tu Mundo Awards" are organized by the U.S. television network Telemundo, being the 30 August the first installment of the awards, taking place in the city of Miami. It has 24 categories and awards the best of music and television, as well as sports and modeling.

#	Year	Nominated	Category	Result
#1	2012	Anahí	I'm Sexy And I Know It	Won

== Recognitions ==
Year	Notes	Ref.
2008	The newspaper "The New York Times" named her as the voice of the moment.	
2009	Anahi was considered the second most searched for Latin artist in Google.	
2010	VIP Magazine chose her as one of "The 10 Sexiest Women on the Planet".	
2010	The magazine People en Español named her one of "50 Most Beautiful".	
2010	The magazine People en Español named her one of "The 25 Most Powerful Women".	
2010	Anahi became the most followed artist on social networks in Mexico.	
2010	VIP Magazine chose her as one of "The 100 Sexiest Women of 2010".	
2011	Anahi receive recognition in the event Oye 89.7.	
2011	Anahi heads the list of "The 10 most influential artists of Mexico".	
2011	Sexenio Magazine named her one of "The 36 leaders of 2011".	
2011	The magazine Caras Mexico named her one of "The 10 Most Beautiful Faces of Television".	
2011	VIP Magazine chose her as one of "The 100 Sexiest Women of 2011".	
2012	Sexenio Magazine named her one of "The 36 Leaders of 2012".	
2012	The magazine Maxim named her as "One of The World's Sexiest Women", in the Maxim Hot 100 of 2012.	
2018	The magazine People en Español named her one of "The 25 Most Powerful Women".	
