= Anahí (disambiguation) =

Anahí is a Mexican actress and singer.

Anahí may also refer to:

- Anahí (album), a 1993 album by Anahí
- Anahí de Cárdenas, a Peruvian actress, model, dancer and singer
- María Dora "Anahí" Sánchez, a former Argentine Senator
- Anahi, from Guarani ana-i “cockspur coral tree (Erythrina crista-galli)”.
