= 2011 Premios Juventud =

8th Premios Juventud
- Date: July 21, 2011
- Location: Watsco Center in Coral Gables, Florida
- Website: Official Page

Television/radio coverage
- Network: Univision

The Premios Juventud 2011 were held on July 21, 2011. The nominees were announced on May 16, 2011

== Winners and nominees ==
=== Special Award "Supernova" ===
- Antonio Banderas

=== Mi Artista Urbano ===
- Daddy Yankee
- Don Omar
- Pitbull
- Tito El Bambino
- Wisin and Yandel

=== La Más Pegajosa ===
- Bon Bon" by Pitbull
- "Heart" Sin Cara "by Prince Royce
- "Danza Kuduro" by Don Omar and Lucenzo
- "The Best of My Life Is You" by Ricky Martin and Natalia Jiménez
- "Loca" by Shakira

=== Mi Video Favorito ===
- "Corazon Sin Cara" by Prince Royce
- "Danza Kuduro" by Don Omar and Lucenzo
- "The Best of My Life Is You" by Ricky Martin and Natalia Jiménez
- "Loca" by Shakira and El Cata
- "Tu Angelito" by Chino y Nacho

=== Lo Toco Todo ===
- "Euphoria" by Enrique Iglesias
- "Foreign First Part" of Dulce María
- "Los Vaqueros" El Regreso "by Wisin y Yandel
- "Music, Soul and Sex" by Ricky Martin
- "Sale El Sol" by Shakira

=== La Combinación Perfecta ===
- Enrique Iglesias and Juan Luis Guerra Cuando Me Enamoro
- Enrique Iglesias and Pitbull "I Like It"
- Ricky Martin and Natalia Jiménez "The Best of My Life is You"
- Enrique Iglesias and Wisin y Yandel "Do not Tell Me Not"
- Jennifer Lopez and Pitbull "On The Floor"

=== Mi Artista de Rock ===
- Alejandra Guzmán
- Juanes
- La Secta All Star
- Mana
- Panda

=== Mi Artista Tropical ===
- Aventura
- Juan Luis Guerra
- Marc Anthony
- Olga Tañón
- Prince Royce

=== Mi Artista Regional Mexicano ===
- Alejandro Fernández
- Banda El Recodo
- Espinoza Paz
- Gerardo Ortiz
- Jenni Rivera

=== Mi Artista Pop ===
- Camila
- Enrique Iglesias
- Luis Fonsi
- Ricky Martin
- Shakira

=== Qué Rico Que Se Mueve ===
- Chayanne
- Dulce María
- Pitbull
- Ricky Martin
- Shakira

=== Voz del Momento ===
- Camila
- Espinoza Paz
- Gerardo Ortiz
- Prince Royce
- Wisin and Yandel

=== Qué Actorazo ===
- Antonio Banderas
- Gael García Bernal
- Jaime Camil
- Javier Bardem
- Kuno Becker

=== Actriz Que Se Roba La Pantalla ===
- Blanca Soto
- Jennifer Lopez
- Michelle Rodriguez
- Salma Hayek
- Zoe Saldaña

=== Película Más Padre ===
- "America"
- "Beverly Hills Chihuahua 2
- "Beautiful"
- From Prada to Nada
- "Machete"

=== Canción Corta-venas ===
- "Aléjate de mi" by Camila
- "Alérgico" of Anahí
- "Bésame" by Camila
- "Heart Without Face" by Prince Royce
- "El" by Jenni Rivera

=== Chica Que Me Quita El Sueño ===
- Belinda
- Blanca Soto
- Danna Paola
- Lucero
- Maite Perroni

=== Quiero Me Vestir Como Ella ===
- Fanny Lu
- Natalia Jiménez
- Dulce María

=== Quiero Me Vestir Como Él ===
- Prince Royce
- Aarón Díaz
- Pee Wee

=== Está Buenísimo ===
- Alfonso Herrera
- Fernando Colunga
- Guy Ecker
- Julián Gil
- William Levy

=== Mejor Tema Novelero ===
- "El" by Jenni Rivera
- "Golondrinas Viajeras" by Lucero and Joan Sebastian
- "Full of Love" by Luis Fonsi
- "Me Enamoré de Ti" by Chayanne
- "Tres Palabras" by Luis Miguel

=== Deportista de Alto Volage ===
- Alex Rodriguez
- Carlos Arroyo
- Guillermo Ochoa
- Javier Hernández
- Lionel Messi

=== La Nueva Promesa del Deporte ===
- Al Horford
- Juan Agudelo
- Monica Puig
- Neymar da Silva Santos Jr.
- Yuriorkis Gamboa

=== Super Tour ===
- "Stand By Me Tour 2011" Prince Royce

=== Mi Ringtone ===
- "Bon Bon" - Pitbull
