= Quiero (Anahí song) =

Single by Anahí

from the album Mi Delirio
- Released: March 16, 2010 (Spain)
- Recorded: 2009
- Genre: Pop
- Length: 3:47
- Label: EMI
- Songwriters: Alejandro Landa; Fernando Montesinos
- Producer: Armando Ávila

Anahí singles chronology
"Me Hipnotizas" (2010)	"Quiero" (2010)	"Alérgico" (2010)

Music video
- "Quiero" on YouTube

"Quiero" (English: "I Want") is a song by Mexican singer Anahí from her fifth studio album Mi Delirio (2009). The song was released as the first single in Spain and third official single overall on March 16, 2010. "Quiero" was nominated as the song of the 2010 in Israel.

== Music video ==
Anahí on her music video for "Quiero".

=== Development ===
A music video was filmed in Los Angeles, California by music video director Ricardo Moreno, co-directed by herself and Guillermo Rosas, with the choreography by American choreographer Robert Rich and animation made in Spain and Philippines.

=== Synopsis ===
The video starts off with Anahí walking in the road. Next, she and her love interest are sitting playing with their hands and making a choreography, where with some gestures show indecision about their actions. She is later shown walking in various places, video ends, it shows a reconciliation as a part of she and her love interest where they finally embrace but she ends up alone. The music video was premiered on May 26, 2010 at Los 40 Principales website.

== Track listing ==
iTunes digital single

No.	Title	Writer(s)	Producer(s)	Length
1.	"Quiero"	Alejandro Landa; Fernando Montesinos	Armando Ávila	3:47

== Chart performance ==
In Spain, the song debuted at number 43.

=== Charts ===
Chart (2010)	Peak position
Spain (Promusicae)	43
