= Mi Delirio (song) =

Single by Anahí

from the album Mi Delirio
- Released: August 14, 2009
- Recorded: 2009
- Genre: Electropop; dance-pop
- Length: 3:12
- Label: EMI
- Songwriters: Anahí Puente; Miguel Blas; Gilberto Cerezo; Ulises Lozano
- Producers: Gil Cerezo; Ulises Lozano

Anahí singles chronology
"El Regalo Más Grande" (2009)	"Mi Delirio" (2009)	"Me Hipnotizas" (2010)

Music video
- "Mi Delirio" on YouTube

"Mi Delirio" (English: "My Delirium") is a song by Mexican actress and singer Anahí from her fifth studio album, Mi Delirio (2009). It was released on digital download on August 14, 2009, through EMI Music. "Mi Delirio" is an electropop and dance-pop song. The song covers topics such as power, seduction and madness.

Anahí performed the song live on several occasions, even as part of the promotion of the album. The first presentation took place during the 2009 edition of Premios Juventud, on July 16 of that year. The song then was named to two award categories. Having not won at all. In Brazil, with the Mi Delirio World Tour, the song was first performed on November 2, 2009, during the participation of the interpreter in the Programa do Jô.

The accompanying music video for "Mi Delirio", directed by Max Gutiérrez, was released on November 17, 2009. It features Anahí in a mental hospital where she appears wearing black lingerie. Soon after the release of the video, it was censored in some countries for "inappropriate content". However, the video reached number one of the most requested videos of Brazil by MTV, which no Mexican act had achieved before. The impact the singer earned two nominations to targeted categories will videos, one for the Premios Juventud and one for Latin Orgullosamente.

== Background ==
The song was written by herself, Gil Cerezo, Ulises Lozano members from Mexican band Kinky and Miguel Blas, it was produced by Gil Cerezo and Ulises Lozano and it's her first solo single since she released her last album Baby Blue in 2000 after almost ten years without a solo album, "Mi Delirio" was performed first time in Premios Juventud 2009 on July 16 in Miami, Florida and was used to close the show. Back later, the song was included on her mini promotional tour Anahí Promo Tour started on August 7, 2009. The official remix features Ken-Y by reggaeton duo R.K.M & Ken-Y was leaked onto the internet and YouTube on December 1, 2009, this remix was produced by Myztiko. An acoustic version was also made in December 2009, which was included in the deluxe edition of Mi Delirio. Another remix was leaked in January 2010 called "Remix Kinky".

== Chart performance ==
The song debuted on the US Billboard Latin Pop Songs chart at number 40, later peaking at number 29. In Venezuela, it has reached number 20.

== Music video ==
Anahí using a straitjacket on her music video for "Mi Delirio".

The video of the song was directed by Max Gutierrez, recorded the October 16, 2009 in Los Angeles, California. It was premiered on November 17, 2009. Launch took place in the following November by the US Univision site. The story told in the video, and the song is about unrequited love that makes crazy Anahí, causing her to be admitted to a mental hospital. On November 30 of that year, through the Vevo service, the video was posted on their official YouTube account. But later it came to be blocked in some countries to present "inappropriate content." This clip video reached number one of the most requested videos in Brazil by MTV, which no Mexican interpreter had managed before. On January 11, 2010, was released the list of the best clips from the portal POPLine, where Anahí was in the first position, leaving behind singers like Lady Gaga, Rihanna, Beyoncé and Britney Spears.

=== Synopsis ===
Anahi is a patient in an insane asylum. During the day, she's inconspicuous while in the night she is seen dancing and having a good time. The video begins with Anahi wearing a straitjacket and pantyhose simulating a mentally broken down attack. It later shows her and the "patients", having neurological problems taking pills, As the chorus kicks off, she is seen wearing a black top showing her stomach and a black skirt dancing with her backup dancers. In the second verse, Anahí appears tied in a table, receiving electroshocks, and in a bed with red sheets wearing all black lingerie through the chorus again. Through the third verse, she is seen sitting in a swing and later disappearing. The video ends with Anahi having a party with her dancers and all of the patients.

=== Controversy ===
The music video caused controversy since it shows the supposed inside of a psychiatric clinic, to what many people felt offended, causing the possibility that the video had been banned from YouTube. The music video was later uploaded to YouTube by her record label.

== Awards and nominations ==
Year	Ceremony	Award	Result
2010	Premios Juventud	Catchiest Tune	Nominated
2010	Premios Juventud	My Favorite Video	Nominated
2010	Premios Juventud	My Ringtone	Nominated
2010	Orgullosamente Latino Award	Latin Music Video of the Year	Nominated
2010	Premios People en Español	Song of the Year	Nominated
2010	Kids' Choice Awards México	Favorite Song	Nominated
2011	Premios Quiero	Music Video of the Year	Nominated

== Track listing ==
iTunes digital single

No.	Title	Writer(s)	Producer(s)	Length
1.	"Mi Delirio"	Anahí; Miguel Blas; Gil Cerezo; Ulises Lozano	Gil Cerezo; Ulises Lozano	3:12

== Charts ==
Chart (2009)	Peak position
US Latin Pop Airplay (Billboard)	29
US Latin Rhythm Airplay (Billboard)	22
Mexico Espanol Airplay	18

== Remixes and versions ==
- Album Version – 3:12
- Ken y Mix (featuring Ken-Y) – 3:25
- Acoustic Version (included on Mi Delirio: Edición Deluxe) – 3:26
- Remix Kinky (included on Mi Delirio: Edición Deluxe) – 4:08

== Release history ==
Region	Date	Format/Version	Label
United States	August 14, 2009	Digital download	EMI
United States	October 1, 2009	Radio premiere	EMI
México	January 19, 2010	Remix Kinky	EMI
México	January 19, 2010	Ken y Mix	EMI
