= Dos hogares =

- Genre: Telenovela; Romance; Drama
- Created by: Emilio Larrosa
- Written by: Emilio Larrosa; Ricardo Barona; Saúl Pérez Santana
- Directed by: Gerardo Gómez; Luis Monroy; Víctor Manuel Fouilloux; Armando Quiñones
- Starring: Anahí; Carlos Ponce; Sergio Goyri; Alfredo Adame; Laura León; Jorge Ortiz de Pinedo
- Theme music composer: Orlando Rodríguez; Diego Girón; Anahí
- Opening theme: "Dividida" performed by Anahí
- Ending theme: "Rendirme En Tu Amor" performed by Anahí and Carlos Ponce; "Dos hogares" performed by Laura León
- Country of origin: Mexico
- Original language: Spanish
- No. of episodes: 150

Production
- Executive producer: Emilio Larrosa
- Producer: Arturo Pedraza L.
- Production locations: Filming; Televisa San Ángel; Mexico City, Mexico; Locations; Mexico City, Mexico; Texas, United States
- Editors: Mauricio Cortés; Norma Ramírez; Rodrigo Morales; Víctor Quiroz
- Camera setup: Multi-camera
- Running time: 41-44 minutes
- Production company: Televisa

Original release
- Network: Canal de las Estrellas
- Release: June 27, 2011 – January 20, 2012

Dos hogares (English title: Two Homes, Double Life) is a Spanish-language Mexican drama thriller telenovela produced by Emilio Larrosa for Televisa in 2011.

Anahí, Carlos Ponce and Sergio Goyri starred as protagonists, while Alfredo Adame, Jorge Ortiz de Pinedo, Olivia Collins, Malillany Marín and Joana Benedek starred as antagonists.

== History ==
Canal de las Estrellas aired Dos Hogares from June 27, 2011 to January 20, 2012, with Abismo de Pasión replacing it. From October 31, 2011 to May 29, 2012, Univision broadcast Dos Hogares at 3pm central, replacing one hour of Ni Contigo Ni Sin Ti.

== Plot ==
Angélica Estrada (Anahí) is a veterinarian committed to her job. She is engaged to Santiago Ballesteros (Carlos Ponce), a young and good-looking architect. She lives with her mother and her brother, Jorge.

Santiago's mother, widow Patricia Ortiz Monasterio (Olivia Collins), doesn't like Angelica and wants Santiago to marry Jennifer (Malillany Marín), Armando Garza's (Alfredo Adame) daughter. Her other son, Claudio (Abraham Ramos), studies Law. Patricia and Ricardo Valtierra (Sergio Goyri) are lovers. In the past, Ricardo was married to Yolanda Rivapalacio (Joana Benedek) but they divorced after Yolanda cheated on him with a man.

Ricardo is the main shareholder at a food company entitled Grupo KNG. Armando, Patricia and he are all members of the Board of Directors of this company. Armando Garza wants to take revenge on Ricardo Valtierra because his father went into bankruptcy and committed suicide because of Ricardo's father.

Angélica marries Santiago. Soon after, Santiago suffers an accident and disappears, being declared "officially dead". Jennifer dates Jorge. Dario Colmenares (Victor Noriega) is Yolanda's lover but he also likes Pamela (Maya Mishalska). Refugio (Laura Leon) is married to Cristobal (Jorge Ortiz de Pinedo) and they have a son named Oscar and a daughter named Cristina. Cristobal is polygamous and he has another wife named Mara with whom he has a boy and a girl, and a mistress called Dayana. Cristina works with Claudio and they start dating.

After two years of mourning, Angélica finds love in Ricardo Valtierra. Ricardo breaks up with Patricia and marries Angélica. Pamela falls in love with Ricardo. Patricia starts dating Armando. Cristobal gets married for the third time, with Dayana. Ricardo and Angélica return from their honeymoon because his mother suffered a stroke. Yolanda claims back her actions at Grupo KNG from Ricardo and she becomes the main shareholder. She is still in love with him. In San Antonio, Texas, Oscar starts dating Dayana.

Santiago reappears and tries to recover his life and Angélica's heart. Angélica now faces a big dilemma: she is married to two different men, both of whom she loves and needs. Santiago suffers from amnesia and lives with a woman named Flor Lopez who loves him. They met in the village where Santiago was found by a woman after his accident. Angelica allows them to stay together and pays for his recovery treatment but she doesn't tell him she's also married to Ricardo. She hides him and doesn't tell the others that he is alive.

Armando hires a woman called Abril to make Jorge fall in love with her and separate him and Jennifer. Dario Colmenares is elected president of the Board of Directors of Grupo KNG but the company faces financial problems and loses millions of pesos because of a fraud committed by Cristobal, Pamela and her step-father Eleazar. Ricardo is presumed guilty by Armando and his rights in the company are canceled by the members of the Board. Dario resigns. Armando becomes president of Grupo KNG. Mara turns out to be Yolanda's cousin. Mara, together with her children, abandons the house where she used to live with Cristobal, goes to Ciudad de Mexico, and becomes Yolanda's personal assistant.

Ricardo is arrested for the fraud at Grupo KNG. Patricia offers him her help to get out of prison in exchange of him leaving Angelica. He declines. By coincidence, Cristina becomes Ricardo's lawyer. Jennifer meets Santiago and afterwards tells Patricia, Claudio and others that he is alive and hidden by Angelica but nobody believes her. Adela, an ex-student of Santiago who is in love with him, discovers that he is alive and starts dating him. Ricardo is released from prison. Jennifer and Dario start dating but she has a one-night stand with Jorge. Ricardo sees Yolanda and Armando kissing in an office. Armando tells him that she cheated on him with Armando. They fight.

Jennifer confesses to Jorge that she dates Dario. Dario and Jorge get into a fight. Cristobal's brother loves Refugio and helps her to become a singer. Claudio and Karina had an affair and she got pregnant. He does not want to marry her. Santiago moves in the same block of flats where Refugio and her family live. One day he hears noise in Refugio's apartment as Servando, a man that Cristina dated for a while, was about to rape Cristina and he saves her. Patricia hires Julian to follow Angelica. He sees her with Santiago and he blackmails her to give him more money than Patricia to keep silence. Jorge wants to shoot Dario but it is he who is injured. Eventually, Julian tells Patricia that her son is alive. Angelica has to choose between her love with Santiago or Ricardo. She chooses Ricardo after Santiago starts dating her godmother's niece Adela. She goes live with Ricardo in his ranch. Unfortunately, Refugio finds out that Cristobal her husband has two other wives, makes him leave the house. Claudio proposes to Cristina and she accepts however when they tell the news to Patricia she lies and says they can't because they're siblings. Heartbroken Cristina and Claudio go do a DNA test, the results turn out negative.

They decide marry since they aren't siblings. Santiaho has trouble loving Adela since he still thinks of Angelica. Jorge goes missing who makes his mom heartbroken. Cristina and Claudio marry and go to their honeymoon. At the ranch, Angelica does what she can so Ricardo isn't in danger due to a bad guys who want rob Ricardo ranch since they heard there is a secret area in the ranch that has gold. Jennifer dad Armando teams up with them to avenge his dad's death which has nothing to do with Ricardo his dad chose to end his life and blames Ricardo instead. At Angelicas wedding to Ricardo, Ricardo gets shot and dies. Heartbroken, Angelica reconnects with Santigo which Adela left him realizing he will always love Angelica. They get married and have two children.

== Cast ==
=== Main ===
- Anahí as Angélica Estrada
- Carlos Ponce as Santiago Ballesteros
- Sergio Goyri as Ricardo Valtierra
- Olivia Collins as Patricia Ortiz Monasterio Ballesteros
- Alfredo Adame as Armando Garza
- Laura León as Refugio Urbina
- Jorge Ortiz de Pinedo as Cristóbal Lagos/Chris Lakes
- Joana Benedek as Yolanda Rivapalacio

=== Recurring ===
- Víctor Noriega as Darío Colmenares
- Claudia Álvarez as Adela Arismendi
- Maya Mishalska as Pamela Ramos
- Theo Tapia as Enrique Arismendi
- Marcus Ornelas as Javier
- Lorena Velázquez as Carmela de Valtierra
- Miguel Palmer as Hernán Colmenares
- Mariana Huerdo as Xochitl
- Carlos Bonavides as Eleazar Pérez
- Abraham Ramos as Claudio Ballesteros
- Malillany Marín as Jennifer Garza Larrazábal
- Lalo "El Mimo" as Gaspar Rincón
- Gabriela Carrillo as Cristina Lagos
- Pablo Magallanes as Óscar Lagos
- Silvia Manríquez as Amparo Mejía
- Maribel Fernández as Enriqueta "Queta" Sánchez
- Érika García as Flor Lopez

=== Guest cast ===
- Pietro Vanucci as Alexander Vadín
- Marisol Santacruz as Mara Sevedo
- Ana Bekoa as Dayana Díaz
- Arturo Vázquez as Julián Martínez
- Gabriela Goldsmith as Verónica Larrazábal
- José Carlos Femat as Jorge Estrada
- Hugo Aceves as Luis Miguel Sánchez "El Ojos Verdes"
- Roberto Tello as Rodolfo de la Colina
- Mauricio García Muela as Mauricio Pérez
- Benjamin Rivero as Braulio
- Elizabeth Valdez as Beatriz Noriega
- Lola Merino as Juana Maria
- José Luis Cordero as Mario
- Rudy Casanova as Don Fidel
- Luis Felipe Montoya as "El Charal"
- Mundo Siller as "El Jagger"
- Marco Uriel as Baldomero Lagos
- Alfredo Alfonso as Julio Cesar Palma
- Sergio Acosta as Cornelio Mendoza
- Diana Golden as Paola Diaz
- Javier Herranz as Leopoldo Garcia
- Diana Villa as Gardenia
- Ivonne Ley as Jacinta
- Xorge Noble as Filemon
- Carlos Miguel as Goyo
- Rogelio Guerra as Rodrigo Valtierra
- Esteban Franco as Artemio "El Lagarto"
- Yolanda Ciani as Martha de Colmenares
- Manuel Landeta as Ernesto
- Edith Kleiman as Dolores
- Archie Lafranco as Servando Uriostegui
- Dobrina Cristeva as Sofía
- Silvia Váldez as Abril
- Emma Escalante as Karina
- Eduardo de Guise as Octavio
- David Rencoret
- Marco Munoz as Esteban
- Felipe Najera as Guillermo
- Alberto Estrella

== Awards and nominations ==
Year	Award	Category	Nominee	Result
2011	Califa de Oro	Best Telenovela of the Year	Emilio Larrosa	Won
2012	Premios TVyNovelas	Best Telenovela	Emilio Larrosa	Nominated
2012	Premios TVyNovelas	Best Actress	Anahí	Nominated
2012	Premios TVyNovelas	Best Actor	Sergio Goyri	Nominated
2012	Premios TVyNovelas	Best Antagonist Actor	Jorge Ortiz de Pinedo	Nominated
2012	Premios TVyNovelas	Best Antagonist Actress	Olivia Collins	Nominated
2012	Premios TVyNovelas	Best Young Lead Actress	Claudia Álvarez	Nominated
2012	Premios TVyNovelas	Best Musical Theme	"Rendirme En Tu Amor" by Anahí and Carlos Ponce	Nominated
2012	Premios TVyNovelas	Best Original Story or Adaptation	Emilio Larrosa; Ricardo Barona; Saúl Pérez Santana	Nominated
2012	Premios Juventud	What a Hottie!	Carlos Ponce	Nominated
2012	Premios Juventud	Girl of my Dreams	Anahí	Nominated
2012	Premios Juventud	Best Theme Novelero	"Dividida" by Anahí	Nominated
2012	Kids' Choice Awards Mexico	Favorite Actress	Anahí	Nominated
