= 2010 Premios Juventud =

7th Premios Juventud
- Date: July 15, 2010
- Location: Watsco Center in Coral Gables, Florida
- Hosted by: Ninel Conde and Pee Wee
- Website: Official Page

Television/radio coverage
- Network: Univision

The 7th Annual Premios Juventud (Youth Awards) were broadcast by Univision on July 15, 2010.

== Performers ==
| Artist (s) | Song (s) |
|---|---|
| Intro | "Premios Juventud 2010" 01:12 |
| Shakira | "Gitana" "Waka Waka (This Time For Africa)" 06:00 |
| Enrique Iglesias Featuring Juan Luis Guerra | "Cuando Me Enamoro" 04:16 |
| Wisin & Yandel | "Irresistible" 02:50 |
| Jowell & Randy Featuring Wisin & Yandel | "Loco" 02:01 |
| Anahí | "Te Puedo Escuchar" 03:14 |
| Chino & Nacho | "Niña Bonita" 04:00 |
| Espinoza Paz | "Al Diablo Lo Nuestra" |
| Pitbull | "The Anthem" "Hotel Room Service" "Watagatapitusberry" "Krazy" "Shut It Down" "I Know You Want Me" 04:29 |
| Juanes | "Yerbatero" |
| Pedro Fernández | "Amarte A La Antigua" |
| Juan Luis Guerra | "Bachata En Fukuoka" "La Guagua" 03:03 |
| Prince Royce | "Stand By Me" |
| Camila | "Aléjate De Mi" |
| Carlos Baute Featuring Marta Sánchez | "Colgando En Tus Manos" |
| Ivy Queen | "La Vida Es Asi" 03:14 |
| Larry Hernandez | "Carita De Angel" |
| Belinda featuring Pitbull | "Egoista" |
| Cristina | "Lo Fiado" |
| Diego Torres Featuring Noel Schajris | "Guapa" |
| Dulce María | "Inevitable" (Ending Act) 03:14 |

== Presenters ==
- Anahí
- Víctor Manuelle
- María Fernanda Yépez
- Fedro
- Dulce María
- Amelia Vega
- Marlon Moreno
- Eugenio Siller
- Blanca Soto
- Andrea Gómez
- Michel Brown
- María Elena Salinas
- Belinda
- Jacqueline Bracamontes
- Selena Gomez
- Joey King
- Ivy Queen
- Juanes
- Diego Torres
- William Levy
- Noel Schajris
- Guy Ecker
- Dyland & Lenny
- Amado Guevara
- Alfonso de Anda
- Scarlet Ortiz
- Wilmer Valderrama
- Ana Patricia González
- Sebastián Zurita
- Rodner Figueroa

== Special awards ==
=== Supernova Award ===
- Shakira

=== Idol of Generations Award ===
- Juan Luis Guerra

=== The Best Dressed Award ===
- Belinda (Female)
- Pitbull (Male)

== Winners and nominees ==
Bold denotes winner not revealed during the ceremony.

=== Music ===
| La Combinacion Perfecta (The Perfect Combination) | ¡Qué Rico se Mueve! (Best Moves) |
|---|---|
| **"Somos El Mundo" - Various Artist**: "All Up to You" - Aventura, Wisin & Yandel and Akon; "Colgando en Tus Manos" - Carlos Baute and Marta Sánchez; "Recuérdame" - La Quinta Estación and Marc Anthony | **Chayanne**: Anahí; Ricky Martin; Shakira |
| Voz del Momento (Voice of the Moment) | La Más Pegajosa (Catchiest Tune) |
| **Espinoza Paz**: Aventura; Chayanne; Luis Fonsi | **"Dile al Amor" - Aventura**: "El Amor" - Tito "El Bambino"; "Me Enamoré de Ti" - Chayanne; "Mi Delirio" - Anahí |
| Me Muero Sin Ese CD (CD To Die For) | Mi concierto favorito (My Favorite Concert) |
| **The Last - Aventura**: Mi Delirio - Anahí; No Hay Imposibles - Chayanne; Primera Fila - Thalía | **La Revolución Tour - Wisin & Yandel**: Dos Mundos Tour - Alejandro Fernández; The Last Tour - Aventura; Palabras del Silencio Tour - Luis Fonsi |
| Canción Corta-venas (Best Ballad) | Mi Video Favorito (My favorite Video) |
| **"Mientes" - Camila**: "Dile al Amor" - Aventura; "Equivocada" - Thalía; "Me Enamoré de Ti" - Chayanne | **"Loba" - Shakira**: "Dile al Amor" - Aventura; "Me Enamoré de Ti" - Chayanne; "Mi Delirio" - Anahí |
| Mi Ringtone Favorito (My Ringtone) | Mi Artista Regional Mexicano Favorito Es |
| **"El Amor" - Tito "El Bambino"**: "Dile al Amor" - Aventura; "Loba" - Shakira; "Mi Delirio" - Anahí | **Espinoza Paz**: Alejandro Fernández; Jenni Rivera; Vicente Fernández |
| Mi Artista Rock Favorito Es... (Favorite Rock Artist) | Mi Artista Pop Favorito es... (Favorite Pop Artist) |
| **Alejandra Guzmán**: Juanes; La Secta All Star; Maná | **Chayanne**: Anahí; Luis Fonsi; Thalía |
| Mi Artista Tropical Favorito Es... (Favorite Tropical Artist) | Mi Artista Urbano Favorito Es... (Favorite Urban Artist) |
| **Aventura**: Luis Enrique; Olga Tañón; Víctor Manuelle | **Wisin & Yandel**: Daddy Yankee; Don Omar; Tito "El Bambino" |

=== Fashion and Images ===
| ¡Está Buenísimo! (What a Hottie!) | Chica Que Me Quita el Sueño (Girl that takes the sleep away) |
|---|---|
| **William Levy**: Chayanne; Anthony "Romeo" Santos; Luis Fonsi | **Jacqueline Bracamontes**: Anahí; Maite Perroni; Thalía |

=== Movies ===
| ¡Qué Actorazo! (Can He Act or What?) | Actriz que se Roba la Pantalla (She Steals the Show) |
|---|---|
| **Alfonso Herrera - (Venezzia)**: Antonio Banderas - (Thick as Thieves); Benicio del Toro - (The Wolfman); Gael García Bernal - (Rudo y Cursi); Kuno Bécker - (From Mexico With Love) | **Zoe Saldaña - (Star Trek and Avatar)**: Ana de la Reguera - (Cop Out); Kate del Castillo - (Julia); Penélope Cruz - (Nine); Salma Hayek - (Cirque Du Freak) |
| Película Más Padre (Favorite Flick) | |
**Avatar**: Cop Out; Our Family Wedding; Rudo y Cursi

=== Pop Culture ===
| Mi Idolo Es (My Idol Is) | Tórridos Romances (Hottest Romance) |
|---|---|
| **Chayanne**: Anahí; Ricky Martin; Thalía | **Adamari López and Luis Fonsi**: Belinda and Giovanni dos Santos; Jenni Rivera and Esteban Loaiza; Niurka Marcos and Eduardo Antonio |
En la Mira de los Paparazzi (Paparazzi's Favorite Target)
**Luis Miguel**: Anahí; Niurka Marcos; William Levy

=== Sports ===
| El Deportista de Alto Voltaje (Most Electrifying Guy Jock) | La Deportista de Alta Tensión (Most Electrifying Girl Jock) |
|---|---|
| **Alex Rodriguez** (The New York Yankees): Cuauhtémoc Blanco (Tiburones de Veracruz); Guillermo "Memo" Ochoa (Las Águilas del América); Javier Hernández (Chivas del Guadalajara) | **Lorena Ochoa** (Golf): Kina Malpartida (Boxing); Marta (Brazilian Soccer League); Milka Duno (Auto Racing) |
| Me Pongo la Camiseta de... (I'm a Die-Hard Fan of...) | La nueva Promesa (The New Pledge) |
| **New York Yankees**: Las Águilas del América; Las Chivas de Guadalajara; Mexican Soccer League | **Jonathan dos Santos** (FC Barcelona): Mark Sanchez (NY Jets); Pablo Barrera (Pumas de la UNAM); Saúl "Canelo" Alvarez (Boxing) |
