= ¿Hoy Es Mañana? =

Studio album by Anahí
- Released: June 16, 1996
- Recorded: December 1995 – March 1996
- Genre: Teen pop
- Label: Paramúsica
- Producer: Peter J. Honerlage

Anahí chronology
Anahí (1993)	¿Hoy Es Mañana? (1996)	Anclado en Mi Corazón (1997)

Singles from ¿Hoy Es Mañana?
- 1. "Corazón de Bombón" Released: 1996; 2. "Por Volverte a Ver" Released: 1996; 3. "Descontrolándote" Released: 1996

¿Hoy Es Mañana? (Today is Tomorrow?) is the second studio album by Mexican singer Anahí, released in Mexico on June 16, 1996. It did not chart anywhere.

This record marks the comeback of Anahí to the music scene, following her eponymous debut LP from 1993. The album featured three singles, with the lead, "Corazón De Bombom" being released alongside a music video. The second single and third singles, "Por Volverte a Ver" and "Descontrolándote", soon followed. All three singles were released in the same year. The record was re-released on 23 November 2011, through digital download in Mexico, Brazil, Spain and the United States. The album uses the imagery of butterflies.

== Disclosure ==
Anahí began promoting the album with live performances of simple songs o the album. In 1996, she sang the theme "Corazón de Bombón" on Mexico's Siempre en Domingo led by Raul Velasco. Anahí performed at the Día del Niño (Children's Day; Day of the Child) Festival singing "Corazón de Bombón". She sang the song again at Galavision Mexico. In 1997, she performed the aforementioned song and "Por Volverte a Ver" at the Teatro Alameda in Mexico City, where she filmed a DVD in VHS format as part of the promotion of her third album Anclado en mi Corazón. In 1998, in an episode of the telenovela Vivo Por Elena, where Anahí played Talita Carvajal, she sings "Corazón de Bombón" as part of a dream sequence.

== Track listing ==
No.	Title	Length
1.	"Descontrolándote"	3:35
2.	"Por Volverte a Ver"	3:13
3.	"Soy Como Soy"	3:14
4.	"Bailar"	3:41
5.	"Mascaras"	3:27
6.	"Fin de Semana"	3:26
7.	"Historia Entre Amigas"	3:24
8.	"Corazón de Bombón"	2:48
9.	"Teléfono Suena"	3:19
10.	"No Me Comparen"	3:40
11.	"Por Volverte a Ver" (Remix)	5:00
