= Anclado En Mi Corazón =

Anclado en Mi Corazón

Studio album by Anahí
- Released: April 18, 1997 (Mexico); February 3, 1998 (US)
- Recorded: October 1996; (Miami, Florida)
- Genre: Latin pop; teen pop; dance-pop
- Label: Paramúsica
- Producer: Peter J. Honerlage

Anahí chronology
¿Hoy Es Mañana? (1996)	Anclado en Mi Corazón (00000000)	Baby Blue (2000)

Singles from Anclado en Mi Corazón
- 1. "Anclado en Mi Corazón" Released: 1997; 2. "Escándalo" Released: 1997; 3. "Salsa Reggae" Released: 1997

Anclado en Mi Corazón is the third studio album by Mexican actress and singer Anahí, released on April 18, 1997, by Paramúsica. The album was produced entirely by Peter J. Honerlage and Anahí recorded her vocals in Miami, Florida.

== Track listing ==
1. "Salsa Reggae" (Rubén Amado) – 5:04
2. "Anclado en Mi Corazón" (Rubén Amado) – 3:09
3. "Para Nada" (Rubén Amado, Juanjo Novaira) – 3:59
4. "Sexy" (Rubén Amado, Juanjo Novaira) – 3:40
5. "A un Metro del Suelo" (Rubén Amado) – 4:07
6. "Porción de Amor" (Rubén Amado, Juanjo Novaira) – 3:59
7. "Con los Brazos en Cruz" (Rubén Amado) – 3:10
8. "Química" (Rubén Amado) – 3:23
9. "Escándalo" (Rubén Amado) – 3:30
10. "Salsa Reggae (Remix)" (Rubén Amado) – 7:43
11. "Anclado en Mi Corazón (Energy Mix Radio)" (Rubén Amado) – 4:10

== Personnel ==
- Assistant – Ivan Doc Rodriguez
- Engineer – Brian Stoltz
- Vocals – Raquel Garcia
- Engineer, mixing – Andres Garcia
- Make-up, stylist – Eduardo Arias
- Engineer – Armando Castro
- Remixing, pre-production – Jesús Castañeda
- Photography – Blanca Charolet
- Arranger, mixing, programming, remixing – Ishmael Ledesma
- Electric guitar – Daniel Leis
- Vocals – Jackie Aguirre
- Executive producer, concept – Peter J. Honerlage
- Engineer – Mario Altamirano
- Assistant – David Rodriguez Jr.
- Design – José Ferrer
- Vocals, vocal arrangement, dirigida, realization – Ruben Amado
- Mastering – Frank Cesarano
- Coordination – Teresa Gomez
