= Inesperado =

Studio album by Anahí
- Released: June 3, 2016
- Recorded: 2015–16; Los Angeles; Mexico City
- Genre: Latin pop
- Length: 39:11
- Language: Spanish; English; Portuguese
- Label: EMI; Universal
- Producer: Cheche Alara; Ettore Grenci; Sebastian J.

Anahí chronology
| Mi Delirio (2009) | Inesperado (2016) |

Singles from Inesperado
- 1. "Rumba" Released: July 24, 2015; 2. "Boom Cha" Released: December 11, 2015; 3. "Eres" Released: February 12, 2016; 4. "Amnesia" Released: May 27, 2016

Inesperado is the sixth studio album by Mexican singer Anahí, released on June 3, 2016, by EMI, it is her first album in seven years.

== Singles ==
- "Rumba" is the lead single and was released via iTunes on July 24, 2015. The music video was filmed in Miami on July 18 and premiered on August 28, 2015.
- "Boom Cha" was selected as the official second single, the song was released on December 11, 2015.
- "Eres" is the third single from the album. It was released digitally on February 12, 2016.
- "Amnesia" is the fourth single from the album. It was released digitally on May 27, 2016.

=== Promo singles ===
Prior to the release of the album, two promotional singles were released exclusively on Apple's iTunes Store as a "Countdown to Inesperado".

- "Están Ahí" was the first promotional single, released on May 25, 2015.
- "Siempre Tú" was the second promotional single, released on May 20, 2016.

== Track listing ==
Standard edition
| No. | Title | Writer(s) | Producer(s) | Length |
|---|---|---|---|---|
| 1. | "Están Ahí" | Julio Reyes; Ximena Muñoz; Andres Torres | Ettore Grenci | 3:28 |
| 2. | "Juntos En La Oscuridad" | Claudia Brant; Alex Cantral; Lazaro Fraga | Grenci | 3:29 |
| 3. | "Temblando" | David Summers | Grenci | 3:31 |
| 4. | "Siempre Tú" | Gloria Trevi; Rosas | Sebastian J. | 3:32 |
| 5. | "Me Despido" | Edgar Barrera; Andrés Castro; Martin Chavero; Mónica Vélez | Torres | 2:59 |
| 6. | "Arena y Sol" (featuring Gente de Zona) | Jovany Barreto; Alexander Delgado; Jesus Herrera; Randy Martinez; Luis Salazar; Paolo Tondo; Tat Tong | Barreto; Herrera; Salazar | 3:26 |
| 7. | "Rumba" (featuring Wisin) | Anahí; Juan Morera; Luis O' Neil | Morera; Sara Lacombe | 3:15 |
| 8. | "Boom Cha" (featuring Zuzuka Poderosa) | Anahí; Alfio Antico; Brant; Rosas; Urales Vargas; Cassiano Juliano; David Quinones | DJ Buddha; DJ Kassiano | 3:39 |
| 9. | "Amnesia" | Brant; Noel Schajris | Torres | 3:27 |
| 10. | "La Puerta de Alcalá" (featuring David Bustamante) | Miguel Campos; Bernardo Fuster; Luis Munoz; Francisco Villar | Grenci | 3:44 |
| 11. | "Eres" (featuring Julión Álvarez) | Anahí; Mariana Vega; Barreto; Salazar; Tondo; Tong | Barreto; Salazar; Swaggernautz | 3:40 |
| 12. | "Inesperado" | Brant; Rafael Esparza; Ettore; Lazaro Fraga | Torres; Mauricio Rengifo | 3:41 |

== Charts ==
| Chart (2016) | Peak position |
|---|---|
| Brazilian Albums (ABPD) | 1 |
| Mexican Top 20 Albums Spanish (AMPROFON) | 3 |
| Mexican Top 100 Albums (AMPROFON) | 4 |
| Spanish Albums (PROMUSICAE) | 77 |
| US Top Latin Albums | 17 |
| US Latin Pop Albums | 6 |

== See also ==
- 2016 in Latin music
