= Mi Delirio World Tour =

2009–11 concert tour by Anahí

- Tour by Anahí
- Location: South America • North America • Europe
- Associated album: Mi Delirio
- Start date: November 3, 2009
- End date: April 24, 2011
- Legs: 3
- No. of shows: 14 in South America; 6 in North America; 7 in Europe; 27 in total

Anahí concert chronology
- El Universo Conspira: Pocket Show (2009–11); Mi Delirio World Tour (2009–11)

Mi Delirio World Tour (also known as "MDWT") was the first worldwide concert tour by Mexican singer Anahí, in support of her fifth studio album, Mi Delirio (2009). The tour was officially announced in August 2009 during her promotional tour in Brazil. According to Billboard, Mi Delirio World Tour was the seventh most profitable tour of 2010.

== Concert synopsis ==
=== Mi Delirio World Tour ===
The tour had its debut on 3 November 2009, in São Paulo, Brazil, with more than 3,000 people, and it ended on 25 March 2010, at the Teatro Metropólitan in Mexico.

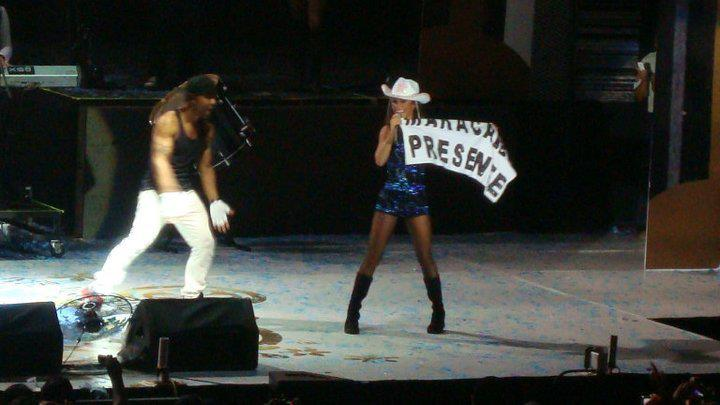
Anahí performing in San Cristóbal, Venezuela.

In addition to São Paulo, the Brazilian cities the tour visited were Rio de Janeiro on 5 November and Fortaleza on 7 November. On 5 December, the singer visited Argentina for the first time since the separation of RBD, and on 6 December she visited Chile.

In March 2010, Anahi gave three concerts in Europe, beginning in Serbia on 10 March, Slovenia on 12 March and Romania on 13 March. That same month, Anahi first sang in Mexico since the separation of RBD. There were three concerts, one in Monterrey on 20 March, one in Guadalajara on the 21st, and ending the tour in Mexico City on the 25th at the Teatro Metropólitan. The concerts counted with the presence of various guests, including Amanda Miguel, Mario Sandoval and his niece, Ana Paula. According to Billboard, the tour was the seventh most profitable in 2010 with only 10 concerts attended by over 35,000 people. The concert on 1 September 2010 alone raised more than $851,000. The opening sets of the tour was in the hands of the Mexican group Matute.

=== Mi Delirio World Tour Reloaded ===
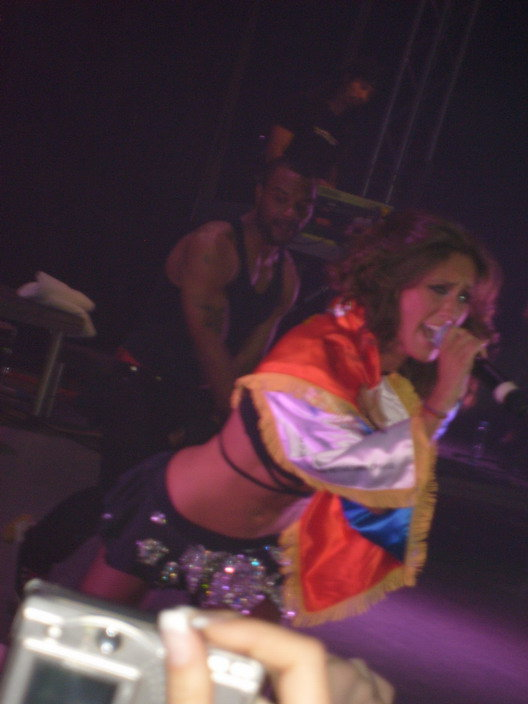
Anahí performing in Serbia, 2010.

In June 2010, it was officially announced by Guillermo Rosas, Anahí's manager, and RRPRO (Rafael Reisman Productions) that MDWT was planned to have a second stage called Mi Delirio World Tour Reloaded. It started on 6 October 2010, in Fortaleza, Brazil with an acoustic show. The entire show with its revamped setlist was performed for the first time three days later in Rio de Janeiro.

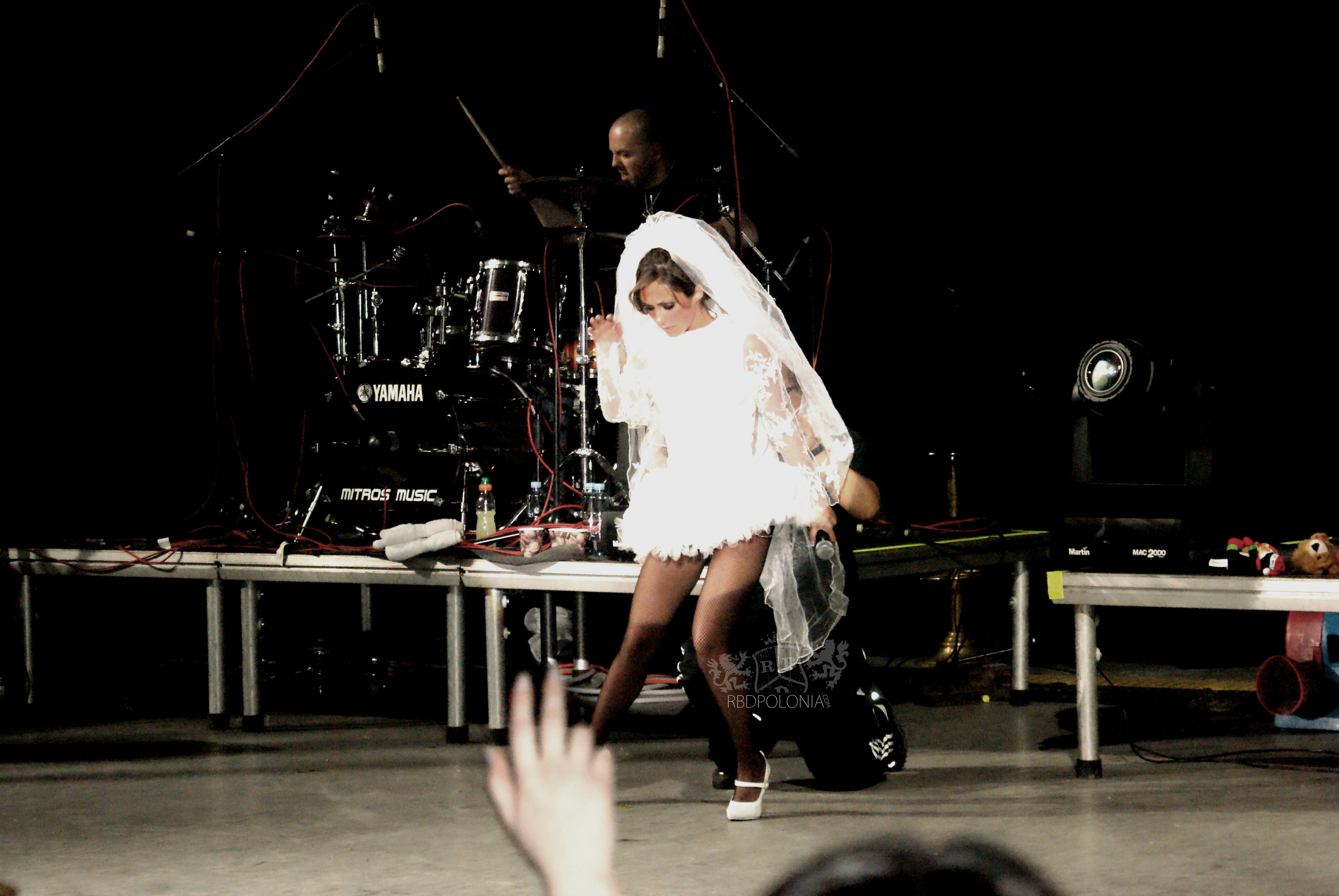
Anahí wearing a wedding dress, while performing "El Me Mintio" during the show.

In December, the tour visited Europe, with the first show in Madrid on December 11, 2010. The writer Paulo Coelho was going to watch this show but for some unknown reason, he did not arrive on time. The show included the participation of singer Jaime Terrón. Other European countries that were visited were Romania, Croatia and Serbia, which had the participation of Guatemalan singer Penya.

The official DVD of the tour was planned to be recorded in this phase. A big part of it was recorded on October 10, 2010, in São Paulo. Anahí confirmed that the DVD would contain footage from the shows in São Paulo, Spain, Romania, Croatia, and Serbia. Besides the footage from the concerts, the DVD also included images from backstage, and her visits in countries like Brazil, Spain and Romania. In the acoustic show on February 9, 2011, in Mexico, Anahi sang the song "Alérgico" with Noel Schajris and "Aleph" with Mario Sandoval; they composed the song together for the book "O Aleph" by Paulo Coelho.

=== Go Any Go ===
MDWT had a third phase called Go Any Go. This phase started with two special shows on March 26 and 27, 2011, in São Paulo and Rio de Janeiro. These shows were made in collaboration with Christian Chávez, who presented his Libertad World Tour mixed with Go Any Go. The tour occurred in Mexico, offering their last 4 concerts in Mexico City, Querétaro and Monterrey. In Mexico, they sang Chavez's song "Libertad".

== Tour dates ==
Date	City	Country	Venue
Leg 1 – Mi Delirio World Tour
November 3, 2009	São Paulo	Brazil	HSBC Brasil
November 4, 2009	São Paulo	Brazil	Carioca Club
November 5, 2009	Rio de Janeiro	Brazil	Vivo Rio
November 6, 2009	Rio de Janeiro	Brazil	Scala Rio
November 7, 2009	Fortaleza	Brazil	Siará Hall
December 5, 2009	Buenos Aires	Argentina	Luna Park
December 6, 2009	Santiago	Chile	Teatro Oriente
January 31, 2010	Caracas	Venezuela	Hipódromo La Rinconada
March 10, 2010	Belgrade	Serbia	Dom Sindikata
March 12, 2010	Ljubljana	Slovenia	Hala Tivoli
March 13, 2010	Bucharest	Romania	Sala Palatului
March 20, 2010	Monterrey	Mexico	Auditório Luiz Elizondo
March 21, 2010	Guadalajara	Mexico	Teatro Galerías
March 25, 2010 ^{[A]}	Mexico City	Mexico	Teatro Metropolitan
Leg 2 – Mi Delirio World Tour Reloaded
October 9, 2010	Rio de Janeiro	Brazil	Vivo Rio
October 10, 2010	São Paulo	Brazil	HSBC Brasil
November 6, 2010	Tabasco	Mexico	La Condesa
December 11, 2010^{[B]}	Madrid	Spain	Palácio Municipal
December 17, 2010	Bucharest	Romania	Arenele Romane INDOOR
December 19, 2010	Zagreb	Croatia	Aquarius Club
December 20, 2010	Belgrade	Serbia	Belgrade Arena
January 22, 2011	San Cristóbal	Venezuela	Plaza de Toros
March 2, 2011	Veracruz	Mexico	Auditorio Benito Juárez
March 7, 2011	Ambato	Ecuador	N-Vidia Club
Leg 3 – Go Any Go
March 26, 2011^{[D]}	São Paulo	Brazil	Via Funchal
March 27, 2011^{[D]}	Rio de Janeiro	Brazil	Vivo Rio
April 24, 2011	Querétaro	Mexico	Teatro del Pueblo

Additional Notes

- A During her presentation in Mexico City, Anahi was joined by Amanda Miguel during "Él Me Mintio" and Mario Sandoval during "Hasta Que Me Conociste".
- B In Madrid, Anahí was joined by Jaime Terrón during "No Te Quiero Olvidar".
- D For the show in São Paulo and Rio de Janeiro, Anahí was joined by Noel Schajris during "Alérgico", "Entra En Mi Vida", and "Te Vi Venir", and Christian Chávez during "Feliz Cumpleaños" and "Libertad".

Cancellations and rescheduled shows

December 4, 2009	Asunción, Paraguay	Club Sol de America	Cancelled
June 18, 2010	Caracas, Venezuela	Centro Sambil	Cancelled
December 14, 2010	Warsaw, Poland	Stodoła	Cancelled

== Gallery ==
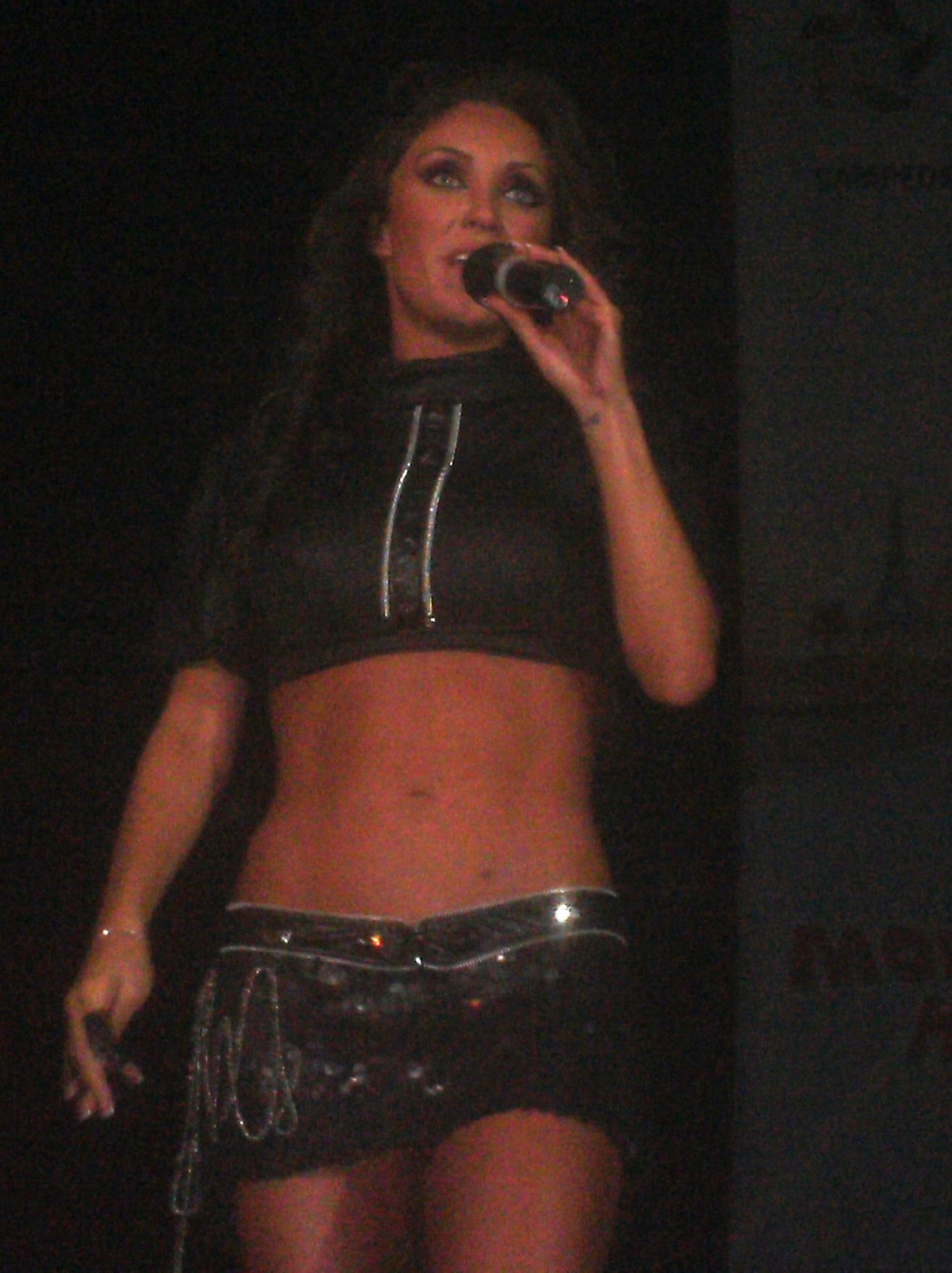
Argentina

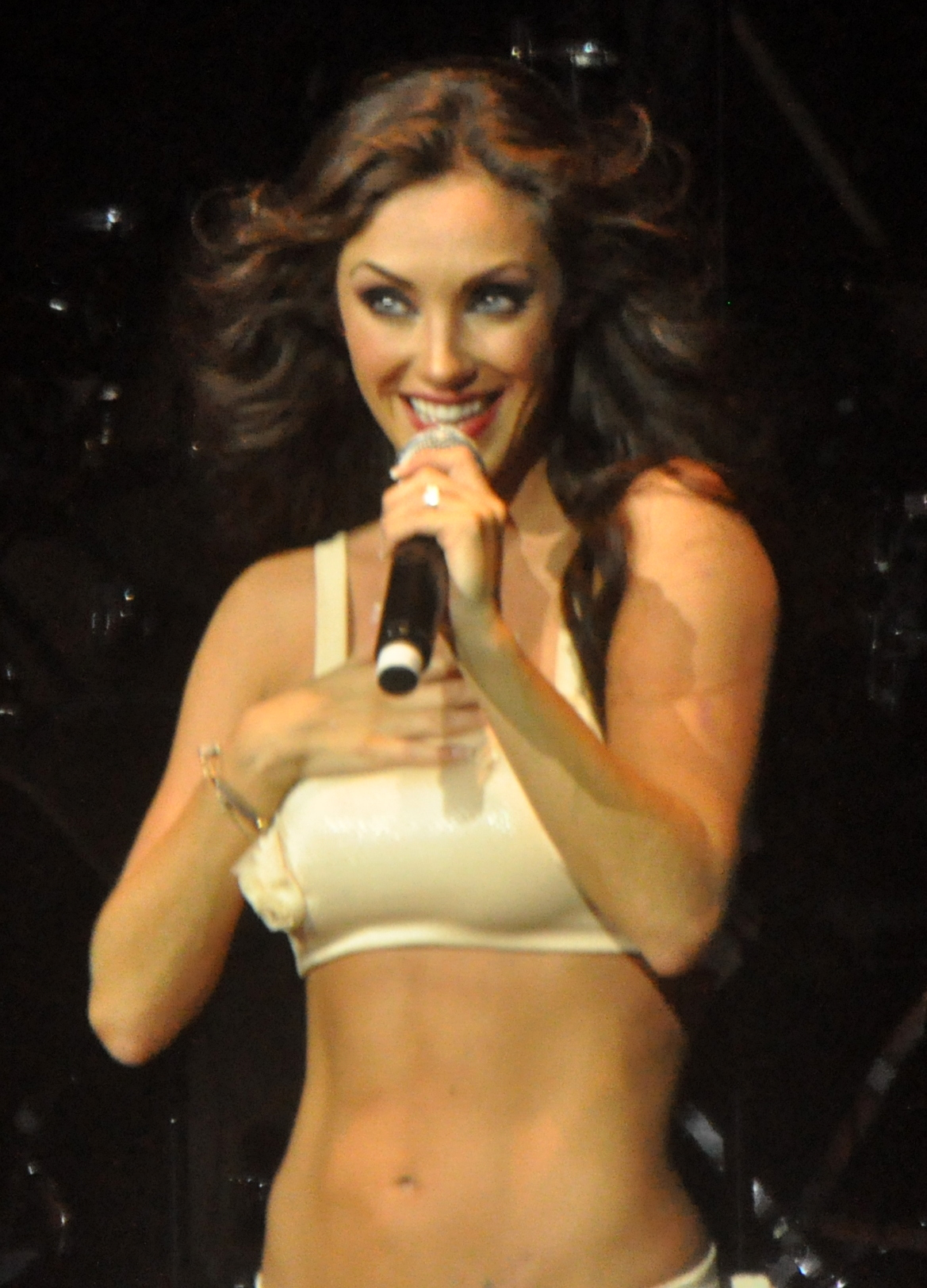
Brazil

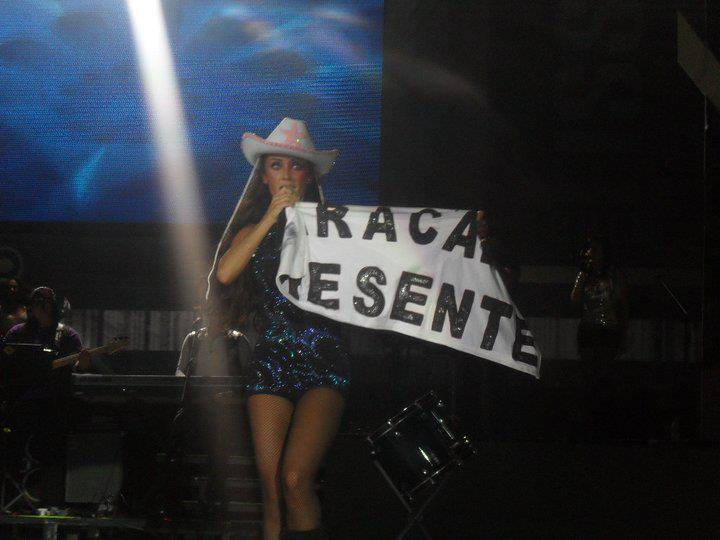
Venezuela

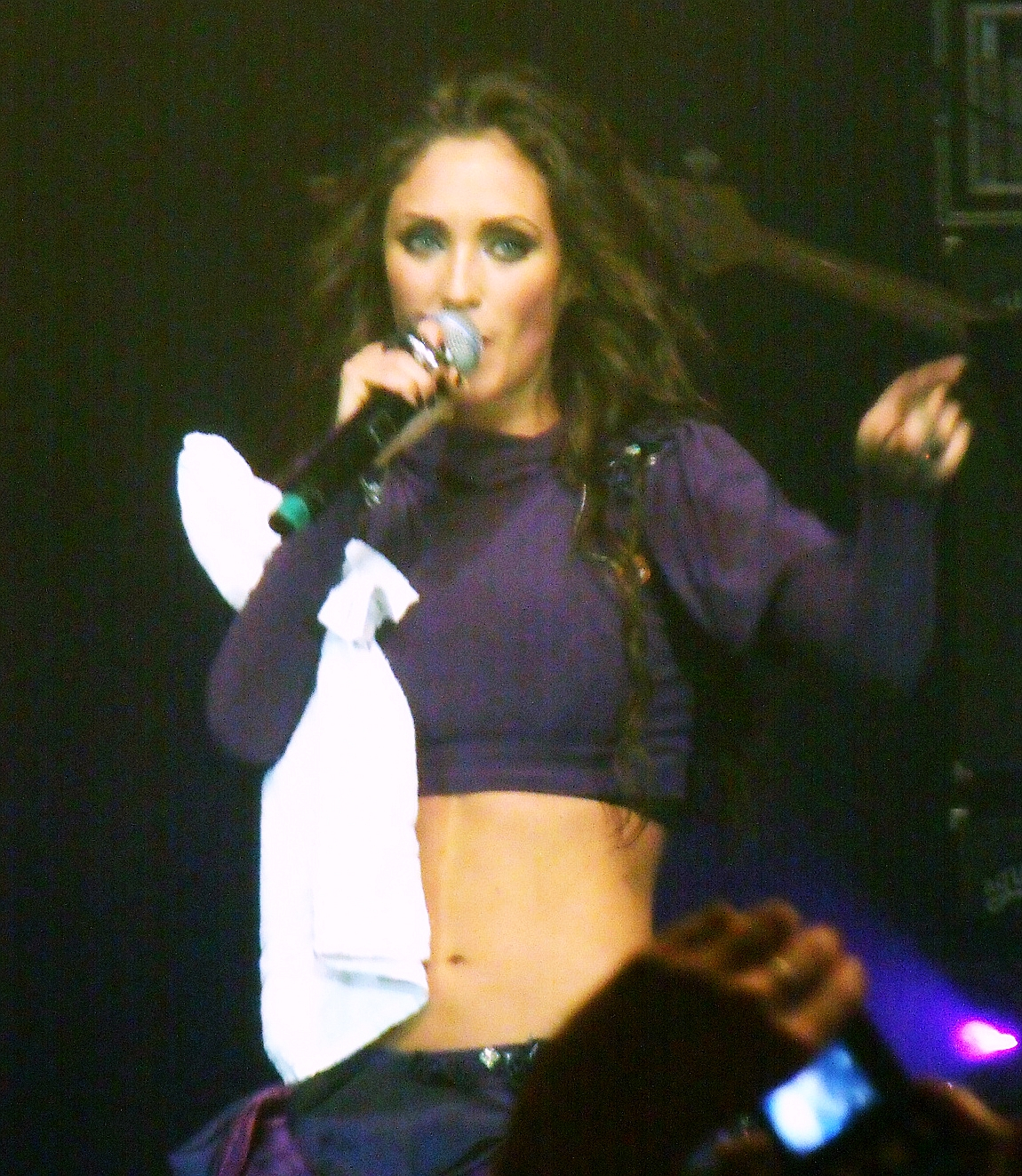
Brazil

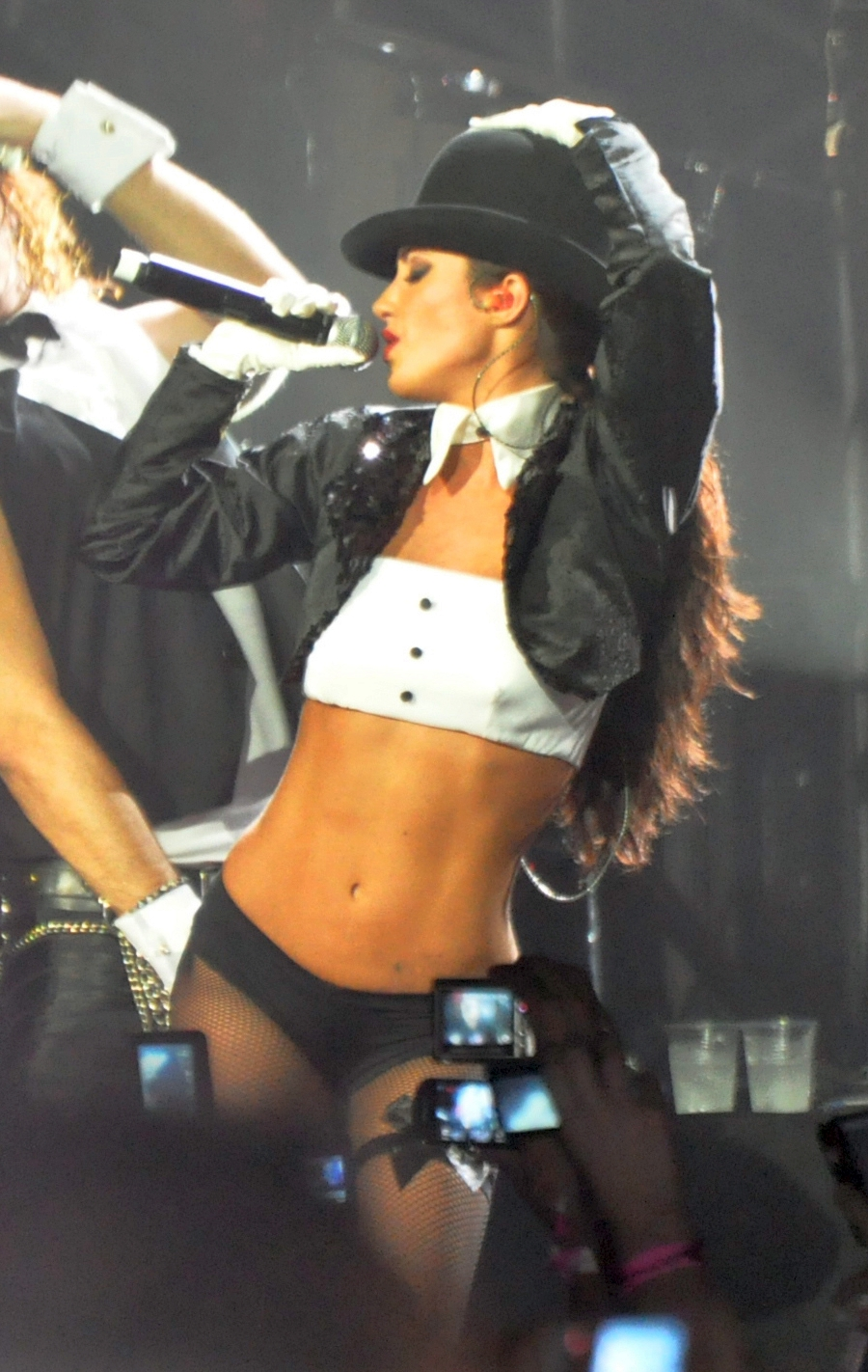
Brazil
