= Me Hipnotizas =

Single by Anahí

from the album Mi Delirio
- Released: March 16, 2010
- Recorded: August 2009
- Genre: Dance-pop
- Length: 3:53
- Label: EMI
- Songwriter: Gloria Trevi
- Producers: Gil Cerezo; Ulises Lozano

Anahí singles chronology
"Mi Delirio" (2010)	"Me Hipnotizas" (2010)	"Quiero" (2010)

Music video
- "Me Hipnotizas" on YouTube

"Me Hipnotizas" (English: "You Hypnotize Me") is a song recorded by Mexican singer Anahí for her fifth studio album Mi Delirio (2009). It was revealed that the song is the second single from the album released on February 22, 2010, on radio, and digitally on March 16, 2010.

== Background ==
In early August 2009, Anahí revealed that Gloria Trevi had given her, two songs composed by herself for her new album; "Me Hipnotizas" and "Mala Suerte" (not included on Mi Delirio). Later, on August 20, 2009, she finally revealed the song's name produced by Gil Cerezo and Ulises Lozano from Kinky and the possibility to include it on her album. Only "Me Hipnotizas" was included on the album. While "Mala Suerte" was excluded from the final track listing, she performed the song on tour, and the studio version was subsequently leaked.

== Music video ==
=== Development ===
A music video for the song was filmed in Woodland Hills, Los Angeles, California in April 2010. It was directed by Ricardo Moreno, with a team of 40 people of different countries. The filming took six hours; she also supervised and collaborated with the design team in charge of wardrobe, animation, and makeup.

Anahí on the music video for "Me Hipnotizas".

The music video director was Ricardo Moreno, a highly respected director who has worked with big names such as: Juan Gabriel, Pepe Aguilar, Los Tigres del Norte and worldwide rock band, Foo Fighters.

=== Synopsis ===
The story plot evolves around a mystical tree that hides a man which has broken Anahí's heart. The video was shot in four main sets, which take Anahí from the desert, streets, forest, and battle zone where she confronts a platoon of soldiers. In the video, she wears several outfits, including an Arab garb in golden tones type, a silver dress and a look very similar to her role in Rebelde. Anahí, is a huge supporter protecting the original entity of nature, in this video she transmits her love for Mother Nature. She also conveys a hidden message of the negative outcome that comes with war.

== Track listing ==
iTunes digital single

No.	Title	Writer(s)	Producer(s)	Length
1.	"Me Hipnotizas"	Gloria Trevi	Gil Cerezo; Ulises Lozano	3:53

== Awards and nominations ==
Year	Ceremony	Award	Result
2010	Orgullosamente Latino Award	Latin Song of the Year	Won

== Charts ==
On the Mexican charts, the song was charted at number 11.

Chart (2010)	Peak position
Mexican Singles Chart	11

== Release history ==
Region	Date	Format	Label
Worldwide	February 22, 2010	Radio premiere	EMI
Worldwide	March 16, 2010	Digital download	EMI
