= Anahí (album) =

Studio album by Anahí
- Released: March 22, 1993
- Genre: Teen pop; Latin pop; children music
- Label: Discos America

Anahí chronology
Anahí (1993)	¿Hoy Es Mañana? (1996)

Anahí is the first LP by Mexican singer Anahí. The songs were recorded when she was nine years old. However, it was hampered by a lack of recording and production cohesion and did not do well commercially. Anahí recorded this LP with Discos America in 1993. It is officially a promotional album – it is not considered an official album from Anahí's discography and is no longer available. The song "Te Doy un Besito" served to close a children's show in Mexico and was the only track to promote the album. All the tracks were written by Daniel Garcia and Mario Schajris, with "El Ratón Pérez" written alongside Sciamerella.

== Track listing ==
No.	Title	Writer(s)	Length
1.	"El Ratón Pérez"	Daniel Garcia; Mario Schajris; Sciamerella	2:17
2.	"Apaguen el Despertador"	Garcia; Schajris	2:31
3.	"No le Tengo Miedo al Doctor"	Garcia; Schajris	2:14
4.	"Pastel de Chocolate"	Garcia; Schajris	1:57
5.	"Somos Amigos"	Garcia; Schajris	3:27
6.	"El Blues de la Paleta"	Garcia; Schajris	2:10
7.	"Hay un Chico Que Me Gusta"	Garcia; Schajris	2:36
8.	"El Twist de Mi Hermano"	Garcia; Schajris	2:27
9.	"Los Dos al Agua"	Garcia; Schajris	2:20
10.	"Un Casamiento en el Zoologico"	Garcia; Schajris	2:45
11.	"A Bailar la Conga"	Garcia; Schajris	3:33
12.	"Te Doy un Besito"	Garcia; Schajris	1:11
13.	"Mensajero del Señor" (Cassette only)		3:35
