= Alérgico =

Single by Anahí

from the album Mi Delirio
- Released: September 10, 2010 (airplay); October 19, 2010 (digital)
- Recorded: 2010
- Genre: Pop
- Length: 3:55 (album version); 4:03 (Portuguese version); 4:01 (duet with Noel Schajris)
- Label: EMI
- Songwriters: Anahí; Ana Mónica Vélez Solano; Noel Schajris
- Producer: Noel Schajris

Anahí singles chronology
"Quiero" (2010)	"Alérgico" (2010)	"Libertad" (2011)

Renne singles chronology
"Só Para Te Ver" (2010)	"Alérgico" (2010)	"Quero Sentir Você" (2011)

Noel Schajris singles chronology
"La Única En Mi Vida" (2010)	"Alérgico" (2011)	"Quién Como Tú" (2011)

Music video
- "Alérgico (ft. Renné)" on YouTube

Music video
- "Alérgico (ft. Noel Schajris)" on YouTube

"Alérgico" (English: "Allergic") is a song by Mexican singer Anahí released on October 19, 2010. The song is included and taken of the re-release album of Mi Delirio (2009) released as the fourth single. Three versions of the song were recorded, the album version with Anahí only, the Portuguese version featuring Brazilian singer Renne (from Hevo84), included on the deluxe edition (Brazilian edition) from the album, on a duet version featuring Argentinian singer Noel Schajris, released digitally on January 11, 2011, and included on the deluxe edition (Colombian edition) from the album. The song is considered her most successful single from the album in Mexico, since reached number two on the main airplay chart, as well the strong sales in digital marketplaces.

== Background ==
The song is a pop ballad, co-written by herself and Ana Mónica Vélez Solano, and written and produced by Noel Schajris. It was first presented live at the Awards Kids Choice Mexico, September 4, 2010. It was released as a digital download through iTunes Store, in countries United States, Mexico, Spain, Japan, Netherlands, France, Italy, Germany and Montenegro. Anahí confirmed on MTV Brasil that will be three music videos with three versions: Spanish, Portuguese and one in collaboration with Noel Schajris. Rumors say that an English version with Katy Perry was going to be recorded soon, but was never officially confirmed. The song was included in Mi Delirio World Tour.

== Music videos ==
The first music video to be released was the Portuguese version, featuring Renne, premiered on December 12, 2010. The video for the Spanish duet version was premiered on March 9, 2011, featuring Noel Schajris. Both versions have a plot completely different, the Portuguese version shows her and Renne in a break-up attitude, while on the duet version it shows her alongside Noel performing, while Noel plays the piano.

== Track listing ==
Digital download (album version) (Released: October 19, 2010)

1. "Alérgico" – 3:56

Digital download Alérgico (Fan edition) – EP (Released: November 9, 2010)

1. "Alérgico" – 3:55
2. "Me Hipnotizas" – 3:51
3. "Pobre Tu Alma" – 3:18
4. "Ni Una Palabra" – 2:48
5. "Aleph" – 4:15

Digital download (duet version) (Released: January 11, 2011)

1. "Alérgico" (featuring Renne) – 4:03
2. "Alérgico" (featuring Noel Schajris) – 4:01

== Awards and nominations ==
Year	Ceremony	Award	Result
2011	Premios Juventud	Best Ballad	Nominated

== Chart performance ==
Chart (2010)	Peak position
Mexican Airplay Chart	2
