= Rumba (song) =

Single by Anahí featuring Wisin

from the album Inesperado
- Released: July 24, 2015
- Genre: Latin pop
- Length: 3:14
- Label: Universal Latin
- Songwriters: Anahí; Juan Luis Morera; Luis O' Neil
- Producers: Morera; Sara Lacombe

Anahí singles chronology
"Absurda" (2013)	"Rumba" (2015)	"Boom Cha" (2015)

Wisin singles chronology
"Baddest Girl in Town" (2015)	"Rumba" (2015)	"Que Se Sienta El Deseo" (2015)

Music video
- "Rumba" on YouTube

"Rumba" is a song recorded by Mexican singer Anahí for her sixth studio album Inesperado (2016). It features vocals by Puerto Rican rapper Wisin.

== Live performances ==
On July 16, 2015, Anahí and Wisin took the stage of Premios Juventud to perform "Rumba" for the first time.

== Awards and nominations ==
Year	Award	Category	Resulted
2016	Premios Juventud	La Combinación Perfecta	Nominated
2016	Premios Juventud	La Más Pegajosa	Nominated

== Release history ==
Country	Date	Format	Label
World	July 24, 2015	Digital download	Universal Latin

== Charts ==
Chart (2015)	Peak position
Mexico (Monitor Latino Top pop)	4
Mexico (Monitor Latino Top general)	16
Mexico Airplay (Billboard)	34
Mexico Espanol Airplay (Billboard)	8
US Tropical Airplay (Billboard)	1
US Latin Pop Airplay (Billboard)	32
US Latin Rhythm Airplay (Billboard)	23
US Billboard Global Excl. U.S	8

== Certifications ==
Region	Certification	Certified units/sales
Brazil (Pro-Música Brasil)	Gold	30,000^{‡}
^{‡} Sales+streaming figures based on certification alone.
