= Mi Delirio =

Studio album by Anahí
- Released: November 24, 2009
- Genre: Dance-pop
- Length: 39:50
- Labels: EMI; Capitol
- Producers: Anahí; Gil Cerezo; Ulises Lozano; Armando Ávila; Sebastian Jácome

Anahí chronology
Baby Blue (2000)	Mi Delirio (2009)	Inesperado (2016)

Alternative cover
- North American cover

Alternative cover
- Deluxe edition cover

Singles from Mi Delirio
- 1. "Mi Delirio" Released: August 18, 2009; 2. "Me Hipnotizas" Released: March 16, 2010; 3. "Quiero" Released: March 16, 2010

Singles from Mi Delirio: Deluxe
- 1. "Alérgico" Released: October 19, 2010

Mi Delirio (My Delirium) is the fifth studio album by Mexican singer Anahí, released on November 24, 2009, through EMI and Capitol Records. It was her first solo album in nine years since 2000's Baby Blue and after the disbandment of Mexican pop group RBD, which she was a member of for five years. Musically, it is inspired by electronic music, dance, rock, pop and electropop. The album was released simultaneously in Mexico, Spain, Costa Rica, United States, Argentina and Colombia. The singer announced the project after the debut of the first single of the same name "Mi Delirio". Anahí served as composer of select songs on the album and was also involved in art direction and design. She worked along with producers such as Gil Cerezo, Ulises Lozano, Armando Avila and Sebastian Jácome which she had worked with during her time with RBD. The album includes a cover of Mexican singer Amanda Miguel's hit "El Me Mintío", as well as an answer song to Juan Gabriel's "Hasta que te Conocí" titled "Hasta que me Conociste".

In the United States, the album debuted at the second spot on the Billboard Latin Pop Albums and fourth on the Billboard Top Latin Albums, where it sold 11,000 copies. The album also positioned itself in the top spots of Venezuela, Argentina, Mexico and Brazil; the latter sold 20,000 copies. Mi Delirio received a positive reception from critics, who noted the renewed style rarely seen in Latin pop.

== Background ==
The album contains a mixture of electropop, dance and soft ballads. Writing and production from the album includes contributions from Claudia Brant, Rudy Maya, Emilio Ávila (with whom she had worked in RBD), Gloria Trevi, Ángel Reyero of La 5ª Estación, Guillermo Rosas, as well as Anahí herself, who is accredited as co-writer and producer on some songs. The difference from the previous album, Baby Blue, is that there are joyful, sensual and positive songs, which shows a great artistic maturity by the singer. The album was recorded between May and September 2009 in Los Angeles and Mexico City, and directed by Gil Cerezo, Ulises Lozano, Sebastian Jacome and Armando Avila.

In the United States, the album debuted at number four on the Billboard Top Latin Albums and number two on the Latin Pop Albums, falling to the number 19 position the following week, rising to the number 11 position in its third week. The album sold 11,000 copies in the United States. In Mexico, the album debuted at number 28 and the re-edition number 14 on the Mexican Pop Albums chart, getting 15 weeks in the top 100. The Polish site Sunhk Music Day held in the disc as the higher production and co-production of the presented songs among them stand out "Mi Delirio", "Para Qué" and "Hasta Que Llegues Tu" as was displayed in the list of 100 best albums of the year in Poland, where Anahí ranks second in the rankings, leaving behind artists like Lady Gaga and Rihanna. The album received positive reviews, as the magazine People en Español has published:. "This is pop themes with electronic touches, although the arrangements are risky, are innovative and distinct from others already seen in Latin pop yet emphasized the fact all production appears to have been very well done and planned." The song "Quiero" in addition to becoming the Hit of the Summer on the radio from Spain, reached the top of the first virtual radio Rocks Mine in the UK, making Anahí the only Latin to enter the chart for the first time. "Alérgico" was the second-most-played song in Mexico in 2010, being named to the Juventud Awards 2011.

== Composition ==
The album contains 15 tracks, written by composers in particular Noel Schajris, Claudia Brant, Gloria Trevi, Gil Cerezo, Sebastian Jacome, Ulises Lozano, Armando Ávila, Mario Sandoval, Guillermo Rosas, Maya and Rudy and Anahi who co-wrote seven songs on the album. "Ni Una Palabra" was composed by Rudy Maya and Claudia Brant, and was the first single; however, for reasons unknown to date, the song was replaced by "Mi Delirio", and only entered the deluxe version of the album. When producing the album, Anahí asked the Mexican singer Gloria Trevi to write a song for her, because she wanted a composition on her album.

Trevi wrote "Me Hipnotizas" song was the second single from the album. The song "Te Puedo Escuchar" was written by Anahi in honor of her friend Juan Pablo, who died in a car accident in 2007. "Él Me Mintió" is a cover of the Argentine singer Amanda Miguel, who won more modern arrangements. "No Quiero Te Olvidar" was composed by Armando Ávila, with whom he worked several times while in the RBD, and Angel Reyero. Noel Schajris composed with Anahí and Ana Mónica Vélez Solano the song "Alérgico" one of the greatest hits album. Claudia Brant also composed "Pobre Tu Alma" which would be the fourth and final single from the album, however, because the recordings of the Soap Opera Dos Hogares, Anahí ended the release of the album.

== Chart performance ==
In the United States, Mi Delirio debuted at number four on Billboard Top Latin Albums, to later fall to number 56, and climbing back to number 36 in its third week. On the Billboard Latin Pop Albums, the album debuted at number two, falling 17 spots to number 19 the next week, rising to number 11 in its third week charting. In Mexico, the album debuted and peaked at number 28 on the Mexican Albums Chart and number seven on the Mexican Pop Albums.

== Singles ==
- "Mi Delirio" is the lead single and was released via iTunes on August 18, 2009. The music video was filmed in Los Angeles on October 16 and premiered on November 17, 2009. The song was included on her mini-tour Anahí Promo Tour.
- "Quiero" was selected as the lead single in Spain, released on January 30, 2010, and digitally on March 16, 2010. The music video was premiered on May 26, 2010.
- "Me Hipnotizas" a dance-pop song composed by Gloria Trevi was selected as the official second single, the song was released on February 22, 2010, and digitally on March 16, 2010. The music video was premiered on June 1, 2010.
- "Alérgico" is the fourth and last single from the album, which entered the deluxe version of this album. It was released digitally on October 19, 2010. Anahí confirmed on MTV Brasil that will be three music videos with three versions: Spanish, Portuguese (with Renne from Brazilian band, Hevo 84) and one in collaboration with Noel Schajris.

=== Promo singles ===
Prior to the release of the album, three promotional singles were released exclusively on Apple's iTunes Store as a "Countdown to Mi Delirio".

- "Te Puedo Escuchar" was the first promotional single, released on November 3, 2009.
- "Él Me Mintió" was the second promotional single, released November 10, 2009. The song is a cover by the singer Amanda Miguel.
- "Hasta Que Llegues Tú" was the third and final promotional single, released on November 17, 2009.
- "Para Qué" Is the fifth and last promotional single from the album. It was released via iTunes on April 11, 2011. The music video for this song was filmed on October 10, 2010, during a concert that featured the singer in São Paulo, Brazil, from her tour Mi Delirio World Tour or MDWT. It premiered across the YouTube channel of the singer on 18 March 2011.

=== Other songs ===
- "Probadita de Mi" is performed at the end of each show, and in YouTube is now his studio version.
- "Mala Suerte" is another song written by Gloria Trevi along with "Me Hipnotizas" for the album, is also his studio version on YouTube.
- "Claveles Importados" was interpreted in some of the concert, is very popular and welcome among fans because the guitar chords makes it Anahi, although no known studio version but is expected.

== Track listing ==
Standard edition
No.	Title	Writer(s)	Producer(s)	Length
1.	"Mi Delirio"	Anahí; Miguel Blas; Gil Cerezo; Ulises Lozano	Cerezo; Lozano	3:12
2.	"Quiero"	Alejandro Landa; Fernando Montesinos	Armando Ávila	3:47
3.	"Qué Más Da"	Amerika Jimenez; Antonio Rayo	Ávila	3:57
4.	"Hasta Que Llegues Tú"	Rafael Ruiz; Gaby Moreno; Jonathan Mead	Ávila	3:28
5.	"No Te Quiero Olvidar"	Armando Ávila; Angel Reyero	Ávila	3:49
6.	"Me Hipnotizas"	Gloria Trevi	Cerezo; Lozano	3:53
7.	"Para Qué"	Ximena Muñoz; Sebastian Jacome	Jácome	3:22
8.	"Te Puedo Escuchar"	Anahí; Claudia Brant; Rudy Maya; Guillermo Rosas	Ávila	4:24
9.	"Él Me Mintió"	Amanda Miguel; Diego Verdaguer; Graciela Carballo	Cerezo; Lozano	3:09
10.	"Gira La Vida"	Anahí; Richard Harris; Facundo Monty	Ávila	3:26
11.	"Hasta Que Me Conociste"	Alberto Aguilera Valadez	Cerezo; Lozano	3:16

Deluxe edition
No.	Title	Writer(s)	Producer(s)	Length
12.	"Alérgico"	Anahí; Noel Schajris; Ana Solano	Schajris	3:55
13.	"Ni Una Palabra"	Maya; Brant	Maya	2:47
14.	"Pobre Tu Alma"	Anahí; Brant; Mark Porttman; Rosas	Ávila	3:18
15.	"Aleph"	Anahí; Mario Sandoval	Sandoval	4:14
16.	"Mi Delirio" (Acustic)	Anahí; Blas; Cerezo; Lozano	Cerezo; Lozano	3:26
17.	"Mi Delirio" (Remix Kinky)	Anahí; Blas; Cerezo; Lozano	Cerezo; Lozano	4:09

Deluxe edition (Colombian edition bonus track)
No.	Title	Writer(s)	Producer(s)	Length
18.	"Alérgico" (featuring Noel Schajris)	Anahí; Schajris; Solano	Grenci	4:01

Deluxe edition (Brazilian edition bonus track)
No.	Title	Writer(s)	Producer(s)	Length
18.	"Alérgico" (featuring Renne)	Anahí; Schajris; Solano; Renne Fernandes	Grenci	4:03

Alérgico (Fan edition) – EP
No.	Title	Writer(s)	Producer(s)	Length
1.	"Alérgico"	Anahí; Schajris; Solano	Schajris	3:55
2.	"Me Hipnotizas"	Trevi	Cerezo; Lozano	3:53
3.	"Pobre Tu Alma"	Anahí; Brant; Porttman; Rosas	Ávila	3:18
4.	"Mi Delirio"	Anahí; Blas; Cerezo; Lozano	Cerezo; Lozano	3:12
5.	"Ni Una Palabra"	Maya; Brant	Maya	2:47
6.	"Aleph"	Anahí; Sandoval	Sandoval	4:14

Notes:

- "Él Me Mintió" is a cover by Amanda Miguel.
- "Hasta Que Me Conociste" contains samples to "Hasta Que Te Conocí" by Juan Gabriel.
- In the United States, the deluxe edition of the album was not released; instead of this, an Alérgico (Fan edition) – EP was put on sale.

== Awards and nominations ==
Year	Ceremony	Category	Result
2009	G1 Globo Awards	Album of the Year	Won
2010	Premios Juventud	CD To Die For	Nominated
2010	Orgullosamente Latino Awards	Latin Album of the Year	Nominated
2010	People en Español Awards	Best Album	Nominated

== Charts and certifications ==
Chart (2009–10)	Peak position
Croatian International Albums (HDU)	7
Mexican Albums Chart	14
Mexican Pop Albums Chart	7
US Top Current Albums	195
US Top Latin Albums	4
US Latin Pop Albums	2
Brazil Top 10 Album	7

=== Certifications and sales ===
Region	Certification	Certified units/sales
Brazil (Pro-Música Brasil)	Gold	30,000^{*}
^{*} Sales figures based on certification alone.

== Personnel ==
Credits for Mi Delirio:

- Anahí – composer, songwriter, coros, primary artist
- Armando Ávila – composer, coros, Mellotron, mezcla, piano
- Miguel Blas – composer
- Claudia Brant – composer
- Orozco Buendía – viola
- Graciela Carballo – composer
- María Valle Castañeda – cello
- Gil Cerezo – composer
- Sergio Arturo Vargas Chapela – violin
- José Del Aguila Cortés – violin
- Ricardo David – viola
- Jesús De Rafael – violin
- Rafael Esparza-Ruiz – composer
- Alejandra Galarza García – cello
- Enrique "Bugs" Gonzáles – bateria
- Juan Carlos Guzmán – violin
- Richard Harris – composer
- Edith Citlali Morales Hernández – violin
- Sebastian J. – composer
- Amerika Jimenez – composer
- Alejandro Landa – composer
- Alan Lerma – violin
- Ulises Lozano – composer
- Rudy Maya – composer
- Jonathan Mead – composer
- Amanda Miguel – composer
- Arturo Fonseca Miquel – violin
- Fernando Montesinos – composer
- Facundo Monty – composer
- Gaby Moreno – composer
- X. Muñoz – composer
- Luis Miguel Ortega – violin
- López Pérez – violin
- Ulises Manuel Gomez Pinzón – viola
- Antonio "Rayito" Rayo – composer
- Ángel Reyero – composer
- Sergio Rodriguez – cello
- Guillermo Rosas – composer
- Gloria Trevino – composer
- Alberto Aguilera Valadez – composer
- Diego Verdaguer – composer
- Andy Zulla – mezcla
