= Baby Blue (Anahí album) =

Studio album by Anahí
- Released: August 26, 2000
- Recorded: 2000
- Studio: Midnight Blue Studios; (Miami, Florida)
- Genre: Latin pop
- Label: Fonovisa
- Producer: Estéfano

Anahí chronology
Anclado en Mi Corazón (1997)	Baby Blue (2000)	Mi Delirio (2009)

Singles from Baby Blue
- 1. "Primer Amor" Released: May 2000; 2. "Superenamorándome" Released: September 2000; 3. "Desesperadamente Sola" Released: January 2001; 4. "Tu Amor Cayó del Cielo" Released: April 2001

Baby Blue is the fourth studio album by Mexican actress and singer Anahí, released on August 26, 2000, by Fonovisa Records.

== Track listing ==
1. "Es el Amor" (Estéfano) – 4:28
2. "Como Cada Día" (Estéfano) – 4:03
3. "Tranquilo Nene" (Estéfano) – 3:59
4. "Superenamorándome" (Estéfano) – 3:53
5. "Primer Amor" (Estéfano) – 5:06
6. "Aquí Sigues Estando Tú" (Estéfano) – 4:13
7. "Tu Amor Cayó del Cielo" (Estéfano) – 4:06
8. "Volverás a Mí" (Estéfano) – 4:28
9. "Desesperadamente Sola" (Estéfano) – 4:50
10. "Sobredosis de Amor" (Eduardo Paz, Jeronimo) – 3:43
11. "Primer Amor" (Remix) (Estéfano) – 3:40
