= Anahí =

Mexican singer, songwriter and actress

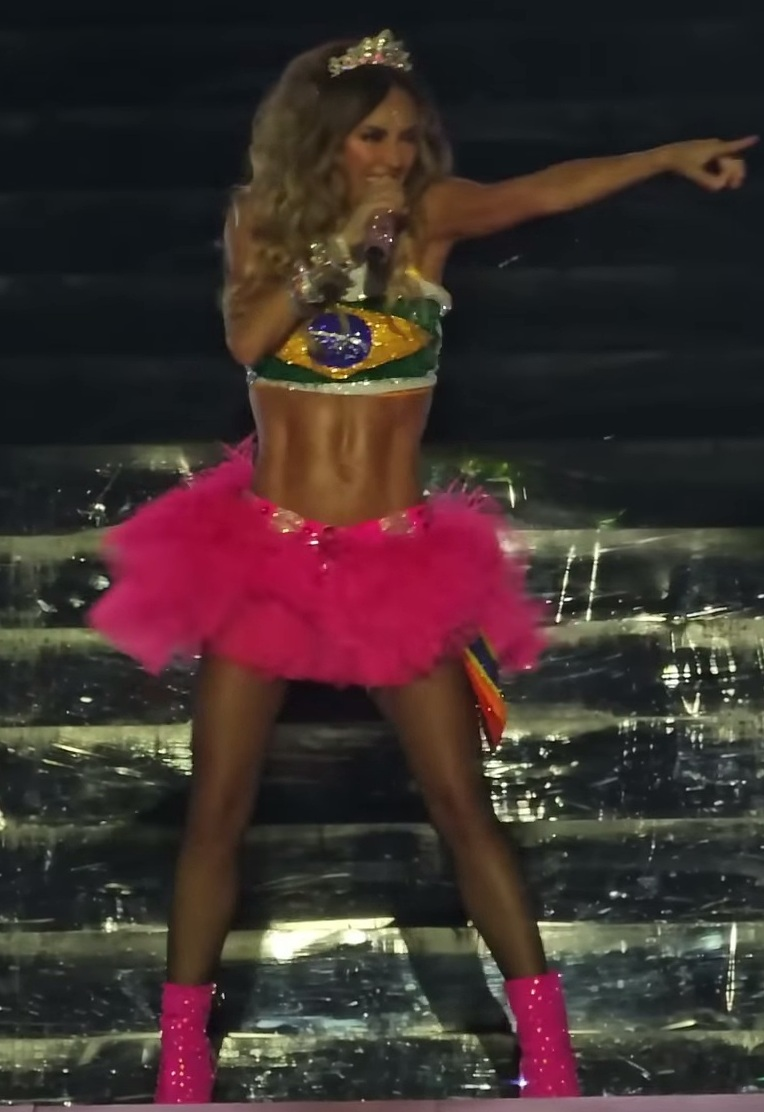
- Anahí in 2023

First Lady of Chiapas
- In role 25 April 2015 – 7 December 2018
- Governor: Manuel Velasco Coello
- Preceded by: Isabel Aguilera
- Succeeded by: Rosalinda López Hernández
- Born: Anahí Giovanna Puente Portilla; 14 May 1983 (age 43); Mexico City, Mexico
- Occupations: Singer; songwriter; actress
- Years active: 1986–2012 (actress); 1986–present (singer)
- Spouse: Manuel Velasco Coello (m. 2015)
- Children: 2
- Awards: Full list
- Musical career
- Genres: Pop; Latin pop
- Instrument: Vocals
- Label: Discos Americá • Paramúsica • Fonovisa • EMI • Capitol • Universal
- Formerly of: RBD

Anahí Giovanna Puente Portilla (born 14 May 1983), known mononymously as Anahí, is a Mexican singer, songwriter and actress. In 1986, she started her acting career when she was cast on Chiquilladas. After working on many successful telenovelas produced by Televisa, including Alondra (1995), Vivo por Elena (1998), El Diario de Daniela (1998) and Mujeres Engañadas (1999), her first leading role was in Pedro Damián's production, Primer Amor... A Mil por Hora (2000). In 2003, she joined the cast of Clase 406. Anahí reached international success in 2004 after starring in Rebelde and being part of the twice-Latin Grammy Award-nominated group RBD, which has sold over 15 million records worldwide. In 2011, she starred in Dos Hogares, her last telenovela to date.

In 1993, at the age of 10, Anahí released her debut self-titled studio album. In 1996, she released her second album, ¿Hoy Es Mañana?, which featured the singles "Corazón de Bombón", "Por Volverte a Ver" and "Descontrolándote". She went on to record two additional albums titled Anclado en Mi Corazón (1997) and Baby Blue (2000). In 2009, Anahí released her fifth album, Mi Delirio, which sold 500,000 copies worldwide. The album debuted at number two on Billboard's Latin Pop Albums chart and number four on Billboard's Top Latin Albums chart, and was certified Gold in Brazil. Mi Delirio World Tour was her first worldwide tour. According to Billboard, Mi Delirio World Tour was the seventh most profitable tour of 2010.

Anahí's sixth studio album, Inesperado (2016), was preceded by the singles "Rumba", "Eres" and "Amnesia". "Rumba", a collaboration with reggaeton singer Wisin, peaked at number one on Billboard's Tropical Songs chart. The album debuted on Billboard's Latin Pop Albums and Top Latin Albums charts, while it was number one on Billboard Brazil, making Anahí the first Mexican artist to achieve that. She has sold over five million albums worldwide in her career as a solo artist, being the best-selling RBD member in the United States. Anahí sings in various languages apart from Spanish, including English, Portuguese and Italian.

== Early life ==
Anahí Giovanna Puente Portilla was born on 14 May 1983, in Mexico City, Mexico, to Spanish father Enrique Puente López, a former singer who later became a television producer, and Mexican mother María del Consuelo "Marichelo" Portilla Gómez. She has an older sister, television personality Marichelo Puente (born 1978), and an older half-sister, Diana Puente Hidalgo (born in Peru in 1965), from her father's previous marriage.

== Acting career ==
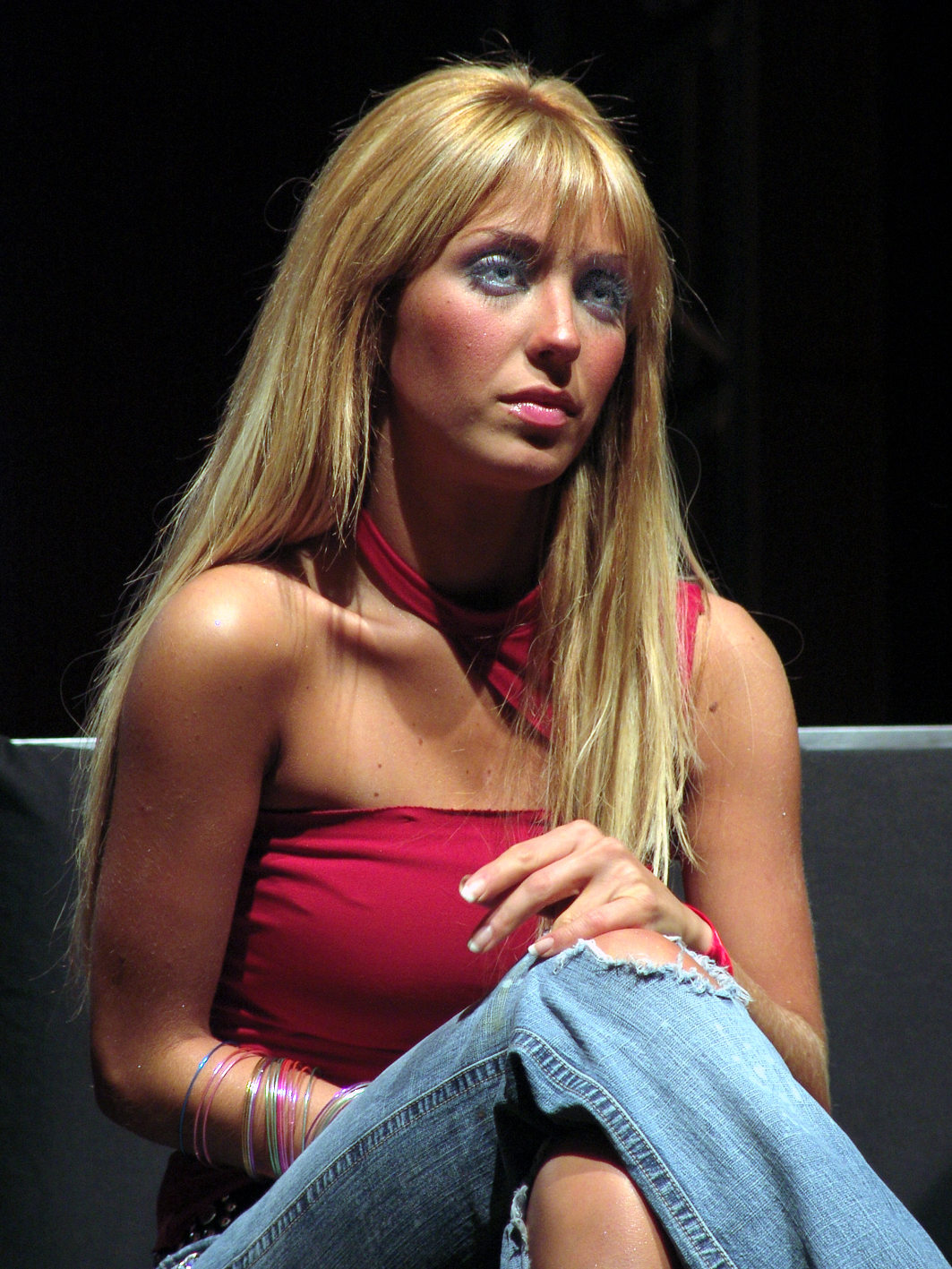
Anahí at a press conference in 2006

Anahí began her career on a Mexican television program called Chiquilladas when she was two years old. She then starred in numerous films, including Nacidos para Morir and Había Una Vez Una Estrella, with the latter earning her an Ariel Award for Best Child Actress in 1989. She then went on to star in several telenovelas, including Mujer, Casos de la Vida Real, Hora Marcada, Vivo por Elena, La Telaraña and El diario de Daniela.

In 2001, Anahí was cast as the fourteen-year-old Jovanna Luna in Primer Amor, alongside Kuno Becker, Ana Layevska, and Mauricio Islas. The teen-oriented soap opera was one of the highest-rated in its time-slot during its run.

In 2002, she was cast as Jessica in Clase 406, where she worked alongside Alfonso Herrera, Dulce María, and Christian Chávez, who later became her RBD bandmates.

She starred in Rebelde in 2004, a Mexican remake of the hit Argentine telenovela Rebelde Way. Before Rebelde, Anahí had coincidentally starred in Ángeles Sin Paraíso with Felipe Colombo, star of the original Rebelde Way. On Rebelde, Anahí portrayed Mia Colucci, a popular girl from a wealthy family. Rebelde was an international hit and had over 440 episodes, airing from 2004 to 2006.

Following the success of Rebelde, in 2007, Televisa released RBD: La familia, which starred the members of RBD. The sitcom was based on the fictional lives of the members of RBD. The characters of the sitcom were not based on the band's characters in Rebelde, but were instead intended to be similar to the actors' real personalities. RBD: La Familia was the first Mexican show shot entirely in HDTV. The show ran from 14 March 2007, to 13 June 2007, lasting 13 episodes.

In February 2011, four years after her last appearance in a TV series, Anahí was chosen to play the lead role in Dos Hogares, a telenovela written and produced by Emilio Larrosa. After prolonged negotiations, Anahí accepted the role. Filming began on 25 April 2011, and ended on 14 January 2012. The TV series premiered on 27 June 2011, and aired its final episode on 20 January 2012.

== Music career ==
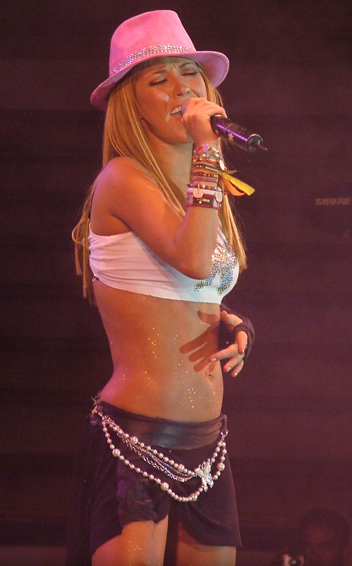
Anahí performing in Tijuana, México (2009)

In 1993, at the age of 10, Anahí released her eponymous debut LP. The project is not considered an official album, and no tracks were released as singles. She later released a second album, ¿Hoy Es Mañana?, which featured the singles "Corazón de Bombón", "Por Volverte a Ver", and "Descontrolándote". She went on to record two additional albums titled Anclado En Mi Corazón and Baby Blue.

The success of Rebelde launched RBD. RBD released nine studio albums, including records in Spanish, Portuguese and English. They have sold over 20 million albums worldwide, 17 million digital downloads, and have toured across South America, North America, Central America and Europe.

In 2006, following the success of RBD, Anahí re-released her solo album, Baby Blue, under the name Una Rebelde en Solitario. The following year, a compilation album was released, titled Antes de Ser Rebelde.

On 15 August 2008, RBD released a statement, stating that they had decided to split up. They went on one final tour, Gira del Adiós World Tour, which ended in late 2008. In November 2008, Anahi and Dulce María collaborated with Tiziano Ferro on a song called "El Regalo Más Grande".

In April 2009, Anahí launched an official website and Twitter page announcing her first solo album since RBD's split. She debuted her first solo single since RBD, "Mi Delirio", at the 2009 Premios Juventud in Miami, Florida. It was released for digital download on 18 August 2009. Mi Delirio was released on 24 November 2009. The album has been certified Gold in Brazil, Anahí becoming the second Mexican artist — after Thalía — who was certified Gold in that country.

According to Billboard, Mi Delirio World Tour was the seventh most profitable tour in 2010. She performed in 10 concerts, attended by over 35,000 people.

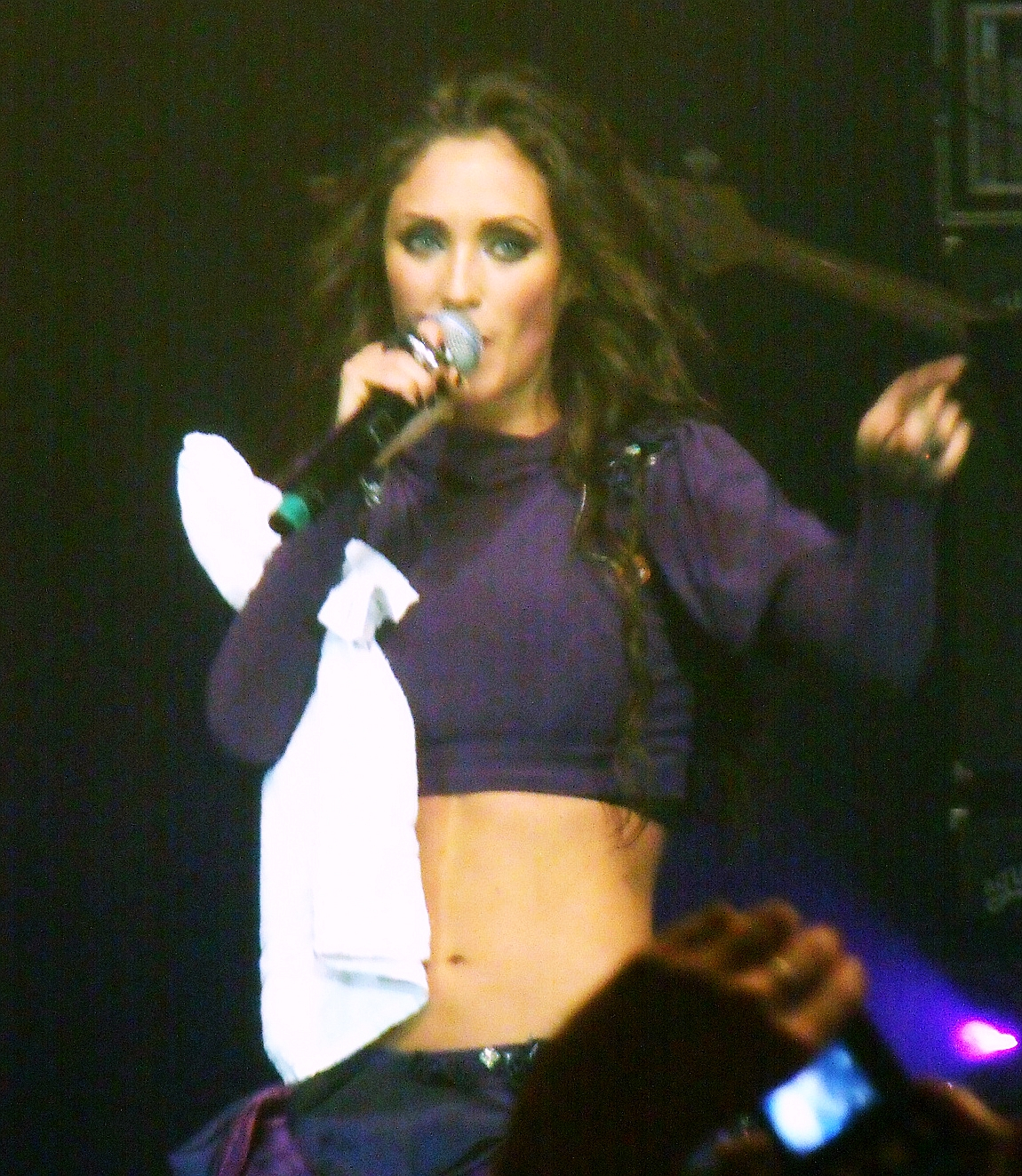
Anahí at her Mi Delirio World Tour at São Paulo, Brazil (2010)

Following the success of Mi Delirio, on 23 November 2010, Anahí released Mi Delirio – deluxe edition. The album includes all the songs released with the first album, plus four bonus tracks: "Alérgico", "Pobre Tu Alma", "Ni Una Palabra" and "Aleph". The first two were released as singles. The album also contains a letter from Brazilian author Paulo Coelho to Anahí, a photo gallery, and a written message from Anahí to her fans. The album contains a song inspired by Coelho's book Aleph, which follows the third single "Alérgico". There are three known versions of the song: the album version with Anahí only; the Portuguese version featuring Brazilian singer Renee Fernandes, included in the Mi Delirio – deluxe edition (Brazilian edition bonus track); and a duet version featuring Noel Schajris, included in the Mi Delirio – deluxe edition (Colombian edition bonus track). (In the US, this version is instead being on a special edition, Alérgico (Fan edition) – EP.)

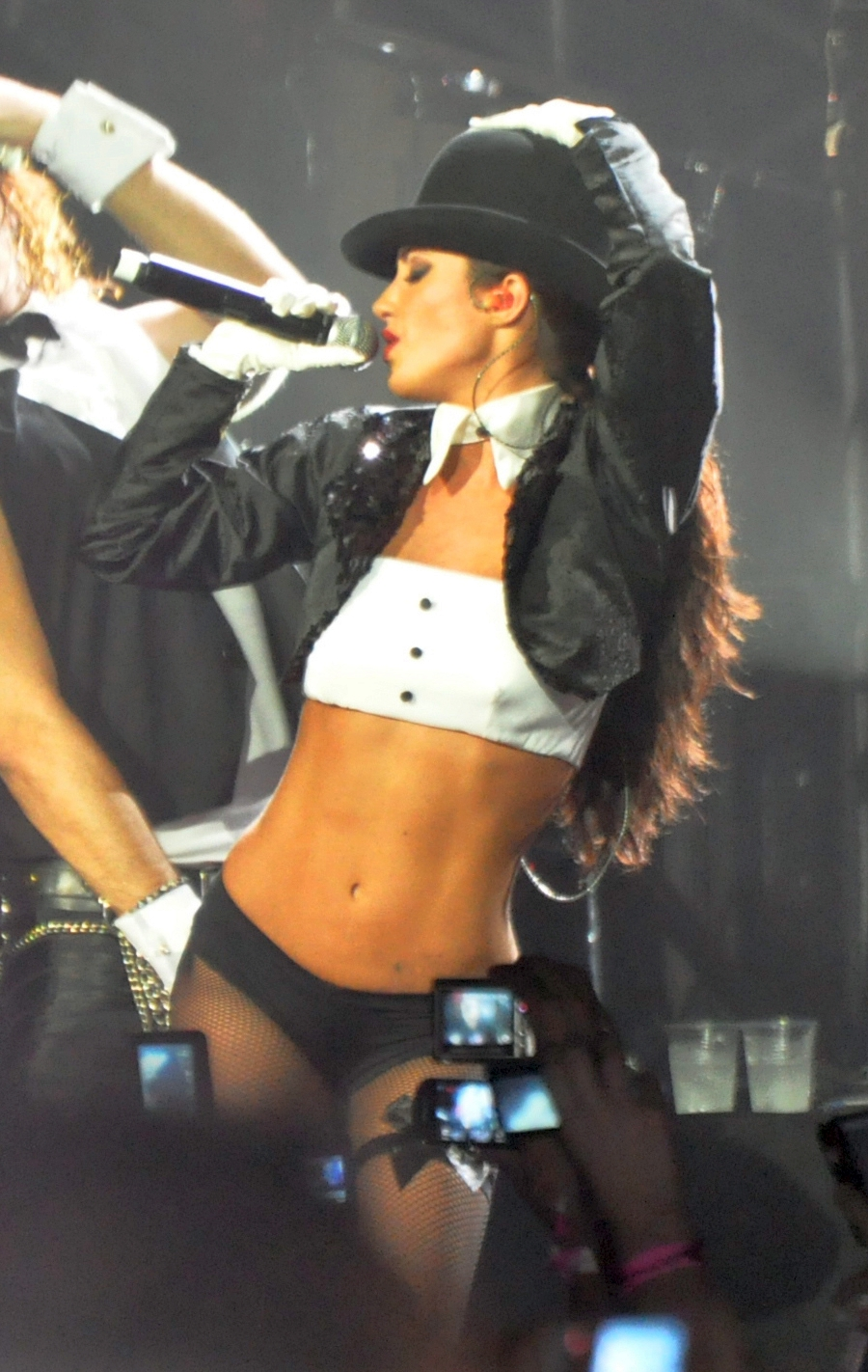
Anahí at her Mi Delirio World Tour at Rio de Janeiro, Brazil (2011)

In 2010, Anahí presented the Kids Choice Awards Mexico and was nominated in three categories, winning for Favorite Artist and Favorite Look. She performed as well, introducing her single, "Alérgico". The album debuted at number 14 in Mexico, spending seven consecutive weeks in the top 100. "Alérgico" became the second most played song in Mexico for 11 weeks, and was number one on iTunes.

In 2011, Anahí and Christian Chávez worked together for the first time since the dissolution of RBD. They recorded a song, "Libertad", which was released on iTunes on 12 April 2011. The song was included on Christian Chávez's album. In May 2011, Anahí and the Latin pop stars Bryan Amadeus and Ale Sergi were invited by MTV Latin America to perform the opening theme for the TV series Popland!. The song, entitled "Click", was released on iTunes on 13 September 2011. On 5 July 2011, Anahí released a new single, "Dividida", which is also the opening theme of the TV series she starred in, Dos Hogares. She also recorded the ending theme with Carlos Ponce, "Rendirme En Tu Amor", which was released on J 24 July 2011. In December 2011, Anahí was invited by Mexican singer Juan Gabriel to be featured on a song with him on his album of duets, entitled "Con Tu Amor".

Anahí released a song called "Absurda" in late 2012, and its lyric video was released on YouTube on 30 January. On 4 February 2013, the single was released for digital download. A new album was announced with a 2013 release date, but was later cancelled.

Anahí released a song, "Están Ahí", without any previous promotion, on 25 May 2015. The song's lyrics pay homage to her fans. A month later, she announced the return of her musical career and released a comeback single "Rumba" featuring Puerto Rican rapper Wisin, and the album Inesperado was released in 2016.

Anahí and her RBD bandmates reunited for a live concert, held on 26 December 2020.

== First Lady of Chiapas ==
Anahí

First Lady of Chiapas
- In role 25 April 2015 – 7 December 2018
- Governor: Manuel Velasco Coello
- Preceded by: Isabel Aguilera
- Succeeded by: Rosalinda López Hernández

On 25 April 2015, Anahí married Manuel Velasco Coello, the Governor of Chiapas, elected in December 2012. While her marriage to the sitting governor would normally make her the head of the Chiapas chapter of the National System for Integral Family Development, the position had already been granted to Leticia Coello, the mother of the then-unmarried Governor, in 2012.

She was widely criticized on social media for wearing a dress costing the state 120,000 Mexican pesos (US$7572, equivalent to $10,285 in 2025) during the 2015 celebrations of the Cry of Dolores in Chiapas. Many of the criticisms focused on the fact that Chiapas is the poorest State in the Union.

== Personal life ==
In the early 2000s, Anahí struggled with anorexia nervosa and bulimia. She weighed approximately 75 pounds (34 kg) at her lowest weight. She spent time in five different treatment centers, and visited doctors and psychologists across the country. In 2001, after returning from a family vacation, she began to feel faint, and was rushed to a hospital, where her heart stopped for eight seconds. She has since recovered and became a vocal spokesperson against eating disorders in Mexico. In 2008, with the support of Televisa, Anahí launched a campaign against anorexia and bulimia.

In 2006, the tax administration of Mexico froze four of Anahí's bank accounts as a preventive measure because she was under investigation for tax fraud. In 2008, after taking the issue to court, Anahí was granted her accounts back, two with Banamex and two at Scotiabank.

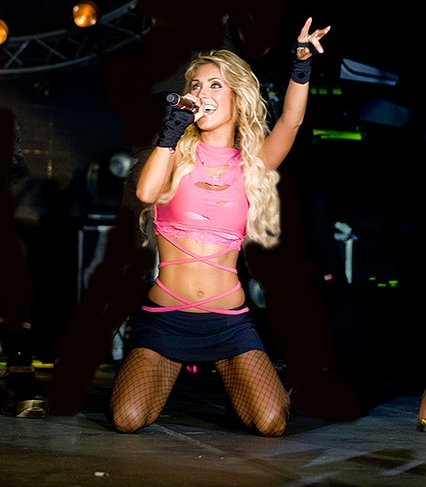
Anahi in 2008

In 2007, a Barbie doll version of Anahí, Dulce Maria, and Maite Perroni were released, based on their characters in Rebelde. People en Español named her one of their "50 Most Beautiful" in 2010.

On 11 March 2011, doctors discovered that Anahí's brain was being deprived of a large percentage of oxygen due to a deviated septum. It was determined that this was the main cause of several ailments that had plagued Anahí, including a heart attack. She underwent a successful operation.

On 23 March 2011, Anahí became the spokeswoman for Snickers in Latin America. The advertising campaign that was launched sparked controversy, with National Council to Prevent Discrimination and the National Institute of Women deeming the commercial sexist and filing complaints. Anahí defended the campaign, saying that the commercial wasn't intended to offend anyone. Effem Mexico, the company behind Snickers, disagreed with the sexism complaints. However, before the advertisement aired, they conducted a survey among women, asking their opinions on the content. According to Effem, the majority of the women surveyed did not feel the advertisement was discriminatory.

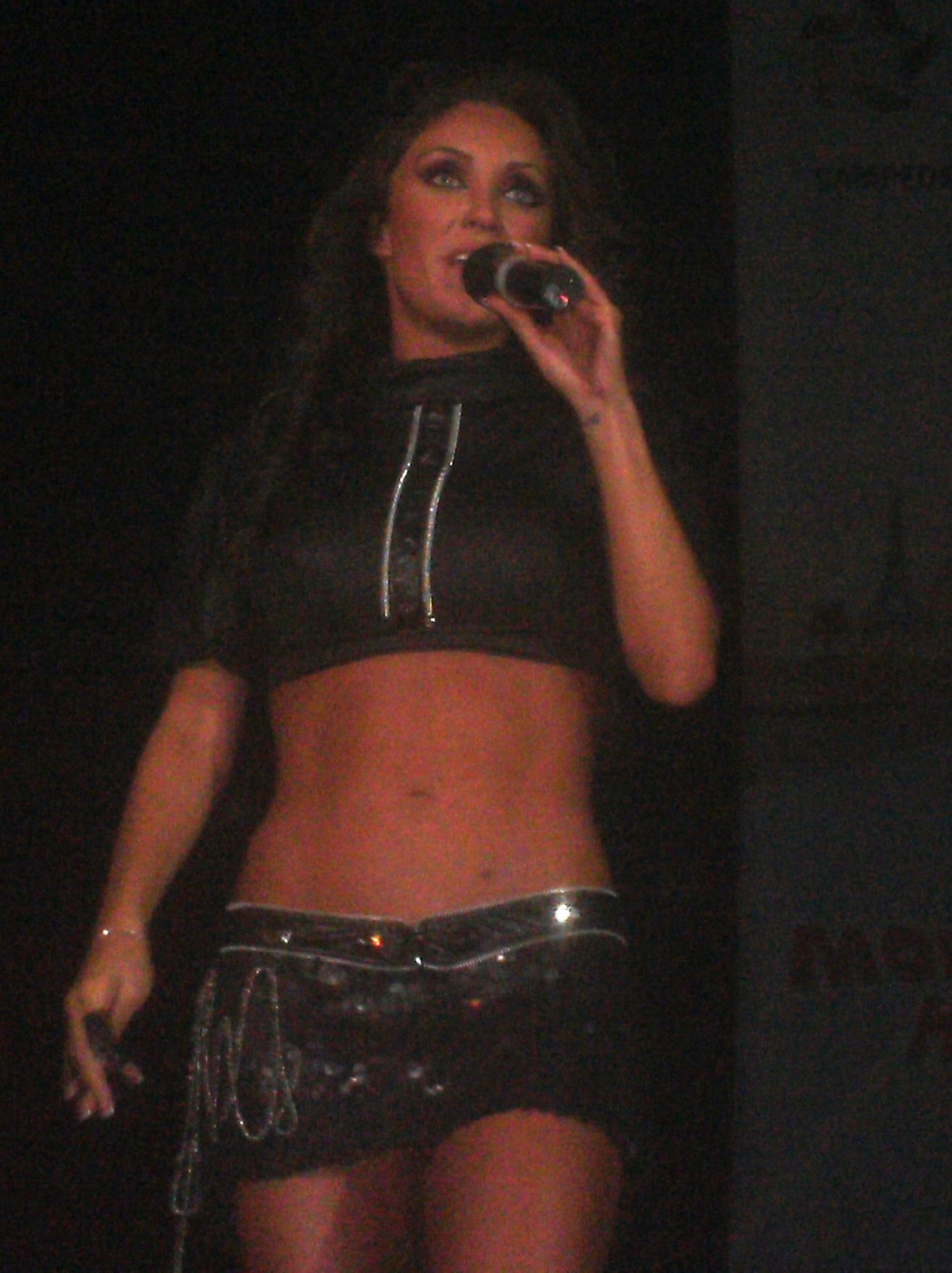
Anahí performing on the Mi Delirio World Tour (2010)

On 18 September 2011, National Geographic aired the original production of "Obsession: Bodies That Scream", filmed in Latin America, which featured the testimonies of people who suffer from body dysmorphia and eating disorders. Anahí spoke about the five-year period in which she suffered from anorexia, and her recovery. On 12 October 2011, Anahí joined the Non-Violence Project's campaign, "Imagine One Billion Faces For Peace", as a Global Ambassador. The campaign's ambassadors include public figures such as Paul McCartney, Yoko Ono, and Ringo Starr. The campaign aims to honor the legacy of the late John Lennon by calling for peace and non-violence worldwide.

During the 2012 Summer Olympics in London, Anahí, alongside other Global Ambassadors, performed in an event for The Non-Violence Project presented by Yoko Ono. Maxim named her as one of the Maxim Hot 100 of 2012, calling her a "Mexican beauty" who represents "a true triple threat: she sings, she acts, and writes hilarious tweets".

On 16 July 2013, a nail polish line by Anahí titled "BE by Anahí" was released. The line is a collection of 25 different colors, with names relating to her music like "rebelde", "delirio", "absurda", "click", "hipnótico" and "Sálvame".

In April 2012, Anahí began dating the governor of Chiapas, Manuel Velasco Coello. They became engaged in October 2014 and married on 25 April 2015, in a private religious ceremony held in San Cristóbal de las Casas. They have two sons: Manuel, born on 17 January 2017 and Emiliano, born on 2 February 2020.

Anahí is Catholic.

== Discography ==
- Anahí (1993)
- ¿Hoy Es Mañana? (1996)
- Anclado En Mi Corazón (1997)
- Baby Blue (2000)
- Mi Delirio (2009)
- Inesperado (2016)

== Filmography ==
=== Television ===
Title	Year	Role	Notes
Chiquilladas	1986	Sundry	
Super Ondas	1989	Marisol	
La hora marcada	1989	Cristina / Doll	
La Telaraña	1989	Paty	
Madres egoístas	1991	Child Gabriela "Gaby" Cantú	
Muchachitas	1991	Betty Ortigoza	
Ángeles sin paraíso	1992	Claudia Cifuentes	Lead role
Papá Soltero	1992	María Eugenia	
Alondra	1995	Margarida Leblanc	
Tú y Yo	1996	Melissa Álvarez	
Mujer, Casos de la Vida Real	1996	Ana	Guest role
Mi pequeña traviesa	1997	Samantha López Carrillo	
Vivo Por Elena	1998	Natalia "Talita" Carvajal	Main cast
Mujeres engañadas	1998	Jéssica Duarte	Main cast
El diario de Daniela	1999	Adela Monroy	Main cast
Locura de amor	2000	Giovanna Luna Guerra	Guest appearance; Episode 115
Primer amor, a mil por hora	2000	Giovanna Luna Guerra	Lead role
LFilmra Pico	2000	Herself	Special guest
Clase 406	2002	Jéssica Riquelme Drech	Main cast; Seasons 2–3
Rebelde	2004	Mía Colucci Cáceres	Main role
RBD: La familia	2007	Annie	Main role
Lola, érase una vez	2007	Herself	Special guest; Episode 137
Viña del Mar International Song Festival	2010	Herself	Judge / Performer
Dos hogares	2011	Angélica Estrada Mejía Ballesteros	Lead role
Lucky Ladies	2015	Herself	Special guest
La Más Draga	2022	Herself	Guest judge; Season 5
¿Quién es la máscara?	2024	Panelist	Season 6

Title	Year	Role
Una Pura y Dos Con Sal	1988	Britany
Asesinato A Sangre Fría	1989	Vitoria
Había Una Vez Una Estrella	1989	María Juana
Nacidos Para Morir	1991	Júlieta
Ayudame Compadre	1992	Carla
El Ganador	1992	Mariana Sant
No me defiendas compadre	1996	Estephania
Inesperado Amor	1999	Ana
Tarde Azul	2000	Nicole

=== Web / Internet ===
Title	Year	Note	Channel	Notes
An^{a}	2019	Herself	AnByAnahi	Nutrition / Cooking, Yoga, Fitness Vlog and Podcast Blog

== Tours ==
- 1997–98: Anclado en Mi Corazón Tour
- 2009–11: El Mundo Conspira: Pocket Show
- 2009–11: Mi Delirio World Tour

== Bibliography ==
- Puente, Anahí. Valiente. MAPorrúa. p. 177. ISBN 978-607-524-263-7.
