= 15th TVyNovelas Awards =

1997 Mexican TV awards

- Date: May 15, 1997
- Location: Teatro Alameda, San Ángel, México D.F.
- Hosted by: Raúl Velasco, Marco Antonio Regil, Julissa & Liza Echeverría

Highlights
- Most awards: Cañaveral de pasiones (10)
- Most nominations: La antorcha encendida (14)

Television/radio coverage
- Network: Canal de las Estrellas

The 15th TVyNovelas Awards were an academy of special awards to the best soap operas and TV shows. The awards ceremony took place on May 15, 1997 in Teatro Alameda, San Ángel, México D.F. The ceremony was televised in Mexico by Canal de las Estrellas.

Raúl Velasco, Marco Antonio Regil, Julissa and Liza Echeverría hosted the show. Cañaveral de pasiones won 10 awards, the most for the evening, including Best Telenovela. Other winners La antorcha encendida won 9 awards, Bendita mentira, Luz Clarita and Sentimientos ajenos won 2 awards and Tú y yo won 1 award.

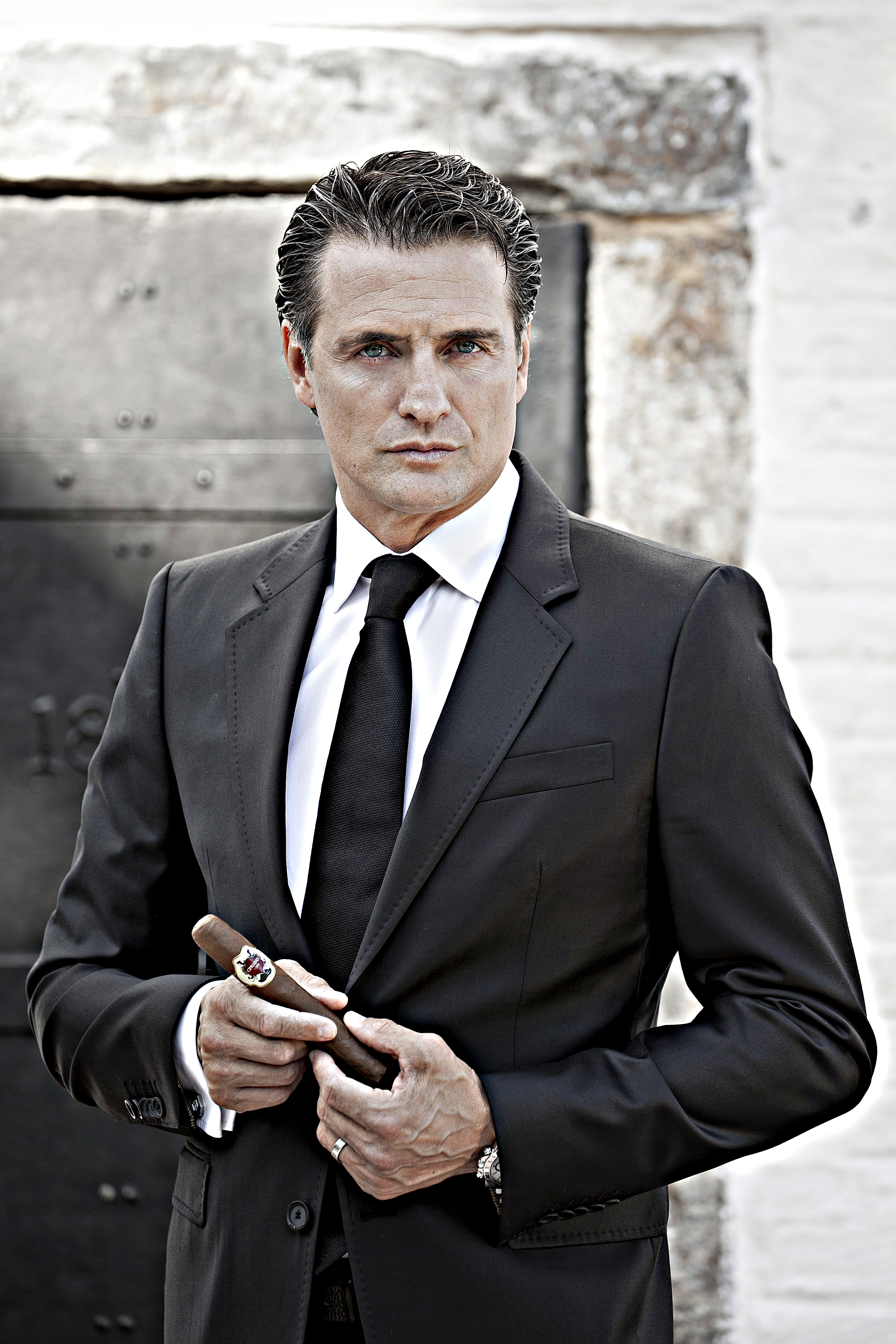
Juan Soler, winner for Best Actor.

== Summary of awards and nominations ==
Telenovela	Nominations	Awards
La antorcha encendida	14	9
Cañaveral de pasiones	12	10
La sombra del otro	5	0
Luz Clarita	4	2
Marisol	4	0
Bendita mentira	3	2
Sentimientos ajenos	3	2
Tú y yo	3	1
Confidente de secundaria	2	0
La culpa	2	0
Para toda la vida	2	0
Azul	1	0
Canción de amor	1	0

== Winners and nominees ==
=== Telenovelas ===
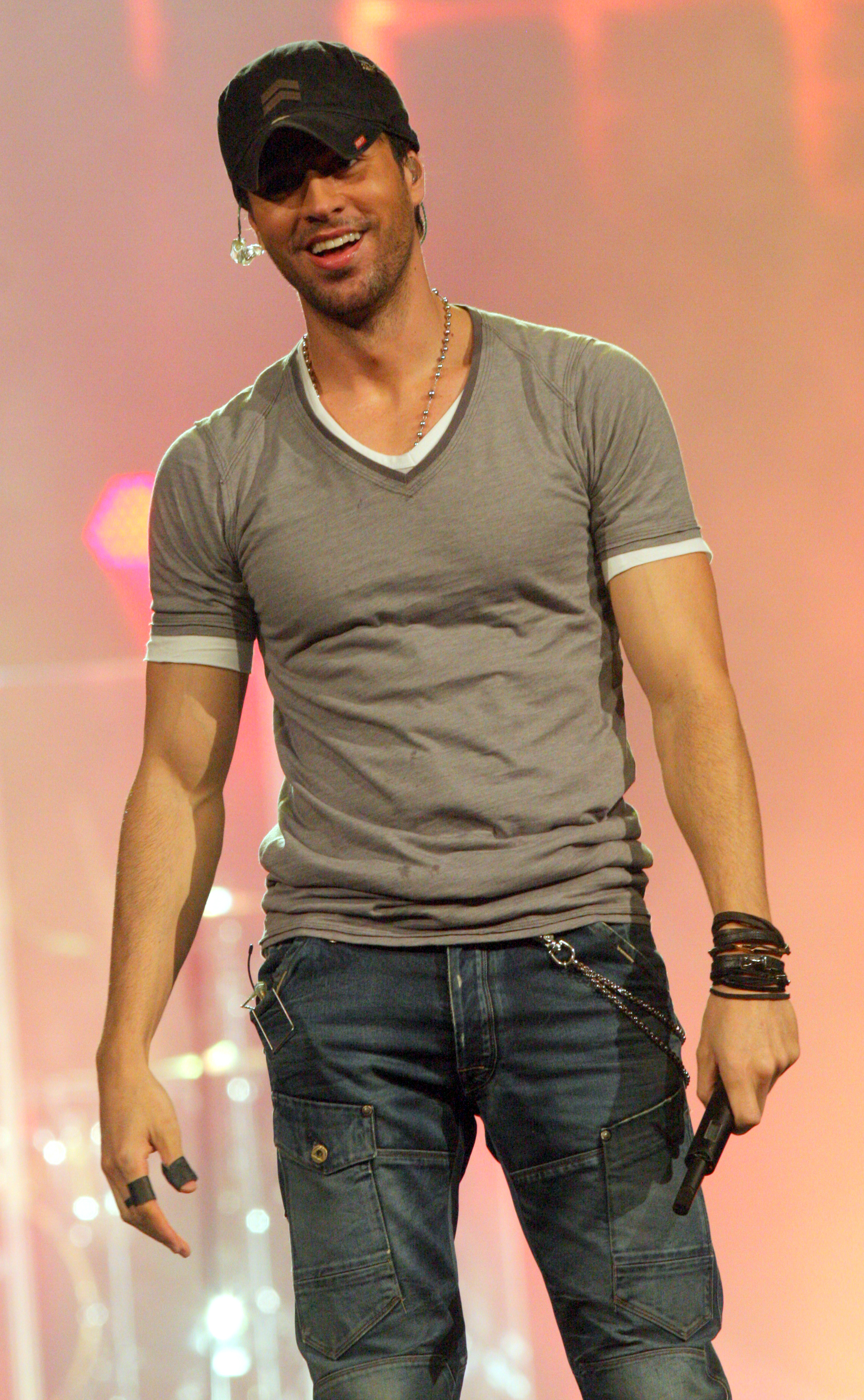
Enrique Iglesias, winner for Male Singer of the Year.

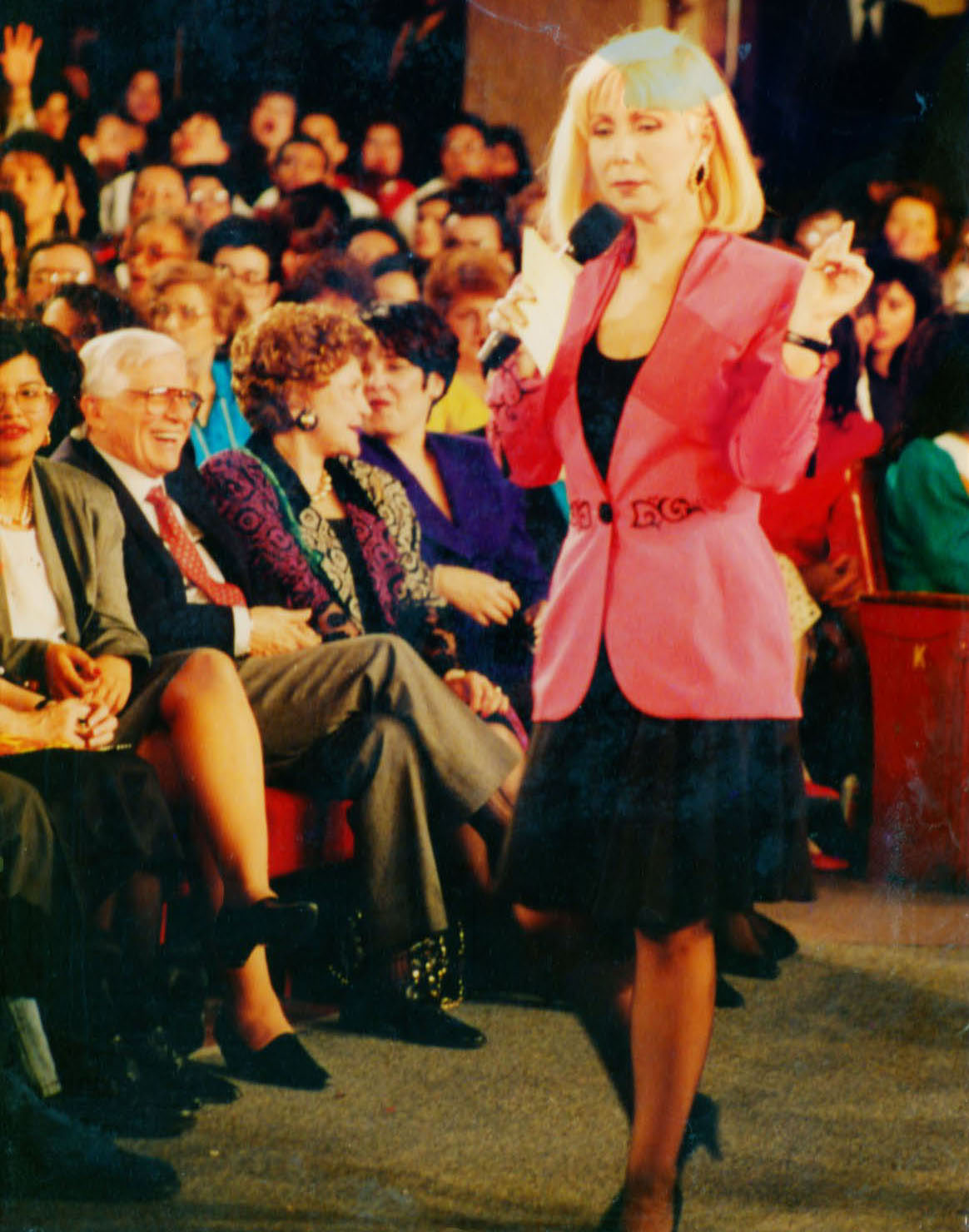
Cristina Saralegui, awarded with a Special Award for Best Latin Hostess with International Projection.

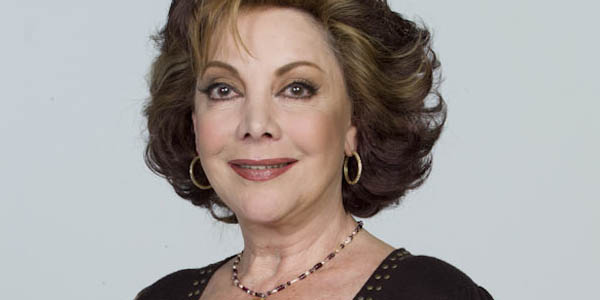
Jacqueline Andere, awarded with a Special Award for her Career as an Actress.

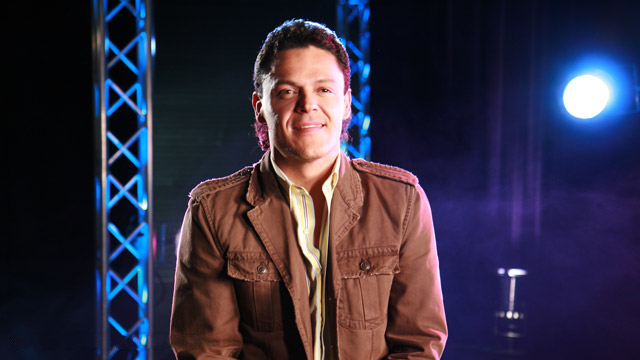
Pedro Fernández, awarded with a Special Award for his Career as a Male Singer.

Best Telenovela	Best Original Story or Adaptation
Cañaveral de pasiones; La antorcha encendida; Sentimientos ajenos	Cuauhtémoc Blanco and Mª del Carmen Peña – Cañaveral de pasiones
Best Actress	Best Actor
Daniela Castro – Cañaveral de pasiones; Erika Buenfil – Marisol; Leticia Calderón – La antorcha encendida	Juan Soler – Cañaveral de pasiones; Eduardo Santamarina – Marisol; Rafael Rojas – La sombra del otro
Best Antagonist Actress	Best Antagonist Actor
Chantal Andere – Sentimientos ajenos; Ana Patricia Rojo – Bendita mentira; Azela Robinson – Cañaveral de pasiones	Roberto Ballesteros – Cañaveral de pasiones; Alejandro Camacho – La sombra del otro; Juan Ferrara – La antorcha encendida
Best Leading Actress	Best Leading Actor
Angélica María – Bendita mentira; Angélica Aragón – Cañaveral de pasiones; Ofelia Medina – Para toda la vida	Jorge Russek – Cañaveral de pasiones; Carlos Bracho – La sombra del otro; Pedro Armendáriz Jr. – La culpa
Best Supporting Actress	Best Supporting Actor
Alma Delfina – Cañaveral de pasiones; Andrea Legarreta – La sombra del otro; Angélica María – La antorcha encendida	Leonardo Daniel – Cañaveral de pasiones; Juan Peláez – La antorcha encendida; Odiseo Bichir – La sombra del otro
Best Female Revelation	Best Male Revelation
Patricia Navidad – Cañaveral de pasiones; Aylín Mújica – Canción de amor; Nora Salinas – Confidente de secundaria	Carlos Ponce – Sentimientos ajenos; Gerardo Quiroz – Confidente de secundaria; Gustavo Ganem – Azul
Best Direction	Best Direction of the Cameras
Benjamín Cann and Claudio Reyes Rubio – Cañaveral de pasiones	Jesús Acuña Lee and Carlos Guerra – La antorcha encendida

=== Others ===
Best Debut Actress	Best Debut Actor
Galilea Montijo – Tú y yo; Lisette Morelos – Tú y yo; Ximena Sariñana – Luz Clarita	Sergio Catalán – Bendita mentira; Kuno Becker – Para toda la vida; Ramón Valdés Urtiz – Tú y yo
Best Young Lead Actress or Actor	Best Child Performance
Verónica Merchant – Luz Clarita; Christian Ruiz – Marisol; Renée Varsi – Marisol	Daniela Luján – Luz Clarita; Eleazar Gómez – Luz Clarita; Paula Sánchez – La culpa
Best Production	Excellence in Performance
Carlos Sotomayor – La antorcha encendida	Ernesto Laguardia – La antorcha encendida; Juan Ferrara – La antorcha encendida; Juan Peláez – La antorcha encendida
Best Scenography	Best Decor
Isabel Cházaro, Ricardo Matamoros and Miguel Ángel Medina – La antorcha encendida	Ricardo Brizuela – La antorcha encendida
Best Costume Design	Best Editing
Cristina Sauza and Beatrice Vázquez – La antorcha encendida	Marcelino Gómez and Roberto Nino – La antorcha encendida

=== Special awards ===
- Career as an Actress: Jacqueline Andere
- Career as an Actor: Ernesto Alonso
- Female Singer of the Year: Lucero
- Male Singer of the Year: Enrique Iglesias
- Career as a Female Singer: María Victoria
- Career as a Male Singer: Pedro Fernández
- Best Latin American Hostess with International Projection: Cristina Saralegui

=== Commercial Awards ===
- Most Beautiful Figure: Mónika Sánchez awarded for Super Jeans Shop
- Most Beautiful Skin: Ana Patricia Rojo awarded for Lubrider

=== Absent ===
People who did not attend the ceremony and were nominated in the shortlist in each category:

- Benjamín Cann
- Humberto Zurita
- Jorge Russek (For health reasons, his daughters, Zully and Vanessa, received the award)
