= Irán Castillo =

Mexican actress and singer (born 1977)

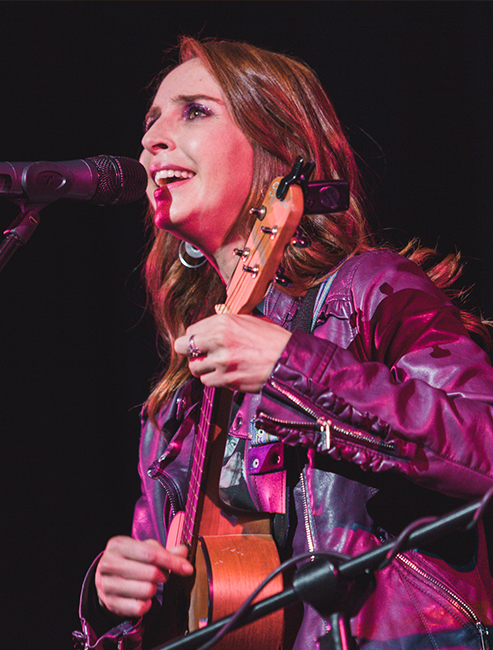
- Born: Irán Castillo Pinzón; 4 January 1977 (age 49); Veracruz, Veracruz, Mexico
- Occupations: Actress, singer
- Years active: 1990–present
- Children: 2
- Website: www.irancastillo.com.mx

Irán Castillo Pinzón (Veracruz, January 4, 1977) is a Mexican singer and actress.

She is known on television for her work in Televisa telenovelas during the 1990s and early 2000s, such as Agujetas de color de rosa, Soñadoras, Preciosa, Confidente de secundaria, and Clase 406, among others. In 1997, she also gained recognition as a singer with the song “Yo por él.”

In film, she stood out for her role in El tigre de Santa Julia, a film for which she won the Best Actress award at the 2003 Heraldo Awards. She was nominated in 2011 for the Ariel Award for her performance in the film Victorio. On television, she has appeared in well-known series such as Mujeres asesinas, Hasta que te conocí (the biographical series on Juan Gabriel), and Los secretos de Lucía.

== 1983–1989: Artistic beginnings ==
Irán was born on January 4, 1977, in the port city of Veracruz, Mexico. The daughter of Carlos Castillo and Martha Pinzón, she showed an early interest in entertainment and asked her mother to take her to audition for the children's television show Chiquilladas. Although she was not selected for the show, someone from the production team invited her to appear in commercials. This marked the beginning of her career in modeling for magazines and television at the age of six.

She began formal acting training at the age of 12 when she enrolled in the acting workshop run by Martha Zavaleta and Pedro Damián, appearing in anthology programs such as Mujer, casos de la vida real.

== 1989–1996: Musical and television debut ==
By the late 1980s, she auditioned to join the group La Onda Vaselina, but due to her height, she was selected to be part of another girl group called Mosquitas Muertas. The group was formed by four girls assembled by Julissa, the same creator of La Onda Vaselina. In 1991, they released a self-titled album with songs such as "Me ha llegado el amor" and "Siempre hay una solución", which were later recorded by Jeans and Kabah respectively.

Around the same time, she began appearing in telenovelas such as Ángeles blancos, De frente al sol, and Entre la vida y la muerte. She also worked as a reporter on the children's program El Club de Gaby.

In 1994, she got her breakthrough role as Cecilia in the telenovela Agujetas de color de rosa, alongside Angélica María, Natalia Esperón, and José María Torre, among others. During the show, she continued her musical career by recording songs for the series' soundtrack, including the lead track "La vida es rosa".

In parallel with the telenovela, she entered the world of theater, starring in the musical Vaselina produced by Julissa, opposite Alejandro Ibarra. At the same time, Irán starred in the television series ¡Qué chavas! and in 1995 appeared in Retrato de Familia alongside Diana Bracho and Yolanda Andrade. In 1996, she landed her first lead role in the telenovela Confidente de secundaria, and continued recording music for the series, including its theme song. That same year, she also starred in the stage play Ce-los Dije.

== 1996–1997: Tiempos Nuevos ==
In 1996, with the support of her mother, Irán Castillo recorded two acoustic tracks, including the song “Tiempos Nuevos.” These recordings were sent to Sony Music, which eventually signed her to release her debut solo album, Tiempos Nuevos, in 1997. The album featured 10 tracks in the Mexican edition and 11 in the U.S. version.

The lead single was the hit “Yo por él,” written by J.R. Florez, which led to an extensive promotional tour across Latin American countries such as Panama, Costa Rica, El Salvador, and Guatemala, as well as performances at radio festivals. The singles “Locos de Amor” and “La Flor del Paraíso” followed.

The album was produced by Mario Figueroa Carvajal, Leticia Rio, and Carlos Cabral Jr., with photography by Ricardo Trabulsi. The sound leaned toward rhythmic ballads, although Castillo has mentioned that she originally intended to record rock music. Thanks to the success of her music and her visibility through telenovelas, Irán Castillo became one of the most iconic figures of late 1990s pop culture in Mexico.

After promoting the album, her song “Feliz Navidad,” included in the compilation Estrellas de Navidad, was selected as the official promotional single for the holiday season.

== 1998–2005: Youth telenovelas and second album ==
In 1998, she starred in the youth telenovela Preciosa alongside Mauricio Islas, performing the opening theme “Girando en el tiempo.” That same year, she joined the main cast of Soñadoras, singing the closing theme “Sola.” This track led to the promotion of her second studio album Tatuada en tus besos, released in 1999. The lead single was “Por ti, por mí,” followed by “No Vendrá,” “Di que no,” and “Y pienso en ti.” The album was well received by the public, prompting the release of several remixes. Produced by Mario Figueroa, Eduardo Posada, and Pablo Pinilla, the album explored a musical balance between pop, ballads, rhythmic ballads, and touches of reggae and dance.

By the end of 1999, she replaced Alejandra Guzmán in the stage production of Gypsy. That same year, she starred in the film La segunda noche and provided the voice for Jessie in the Latin American version of Toy Story 2. (The first male “startalent” was legendary actor Mario Moreno 'Cantinflas'.) She also became the face of brands such as Pantene, M&Ms, and Coppel.

In 2000, after promoting her second album, she joined the cast of the telenovela Locura de amor, appearing alongside Juan Soler during the final week of the show. Later that year, she contributed to the soundtrack of Primer amor... a mil por hora with a remix of her song “Y pienso en ti.”

In 2001, she appeared in the telenovela El derecho de nacer, and made a guest appearance in Aventuras en el tiempo. Her next major television role came in 2002 with the telenovela Clase 406, marking her final youth-oriented project. That same year, she appeared in her third feature film, El tigre de Santa Julia, earning a nomination for Favorite Actress at the MTV Movie Awards México and winning Best Actress at the Heraldo Awards.

After taking a year off and traveling to India, she returned to television in 2004 to star in the telenovela Amar otra vez, produced by Lucero Suárez. The melodrama premiered in January 2004 in the United States and in May of the same year in Mexico. In 2005, she appeared in the historical telenovela Alborada, produced by Carla Estrada. She played Catalina, the sister of Hipólita (portrayed by Lucero), a young woman forced to become a nun despite lacking a religious vocation. For this role, she received a nomination for Best Young Actress at the TVyNovelas Awards.

== 2006–2013: Focus on film ==
Irán decided to take a break from television to pursue a career in film. In 2006, she filmed the movie Amor Xtremo and made a special appearance in the film Efectos Secundarios. On television, she had a role in Mundo de fieras, which would be her last telenovela appearance for several years. That same year, she competed on the reality show Bailando por la boda de mis sueños, becoming one of the finalists and later joining her partner Romeo in a touring show called Show Dancing Club.

In 2007, she appeared in the music video “Ya no sé ni dónde estoy” by Grammy-nominated band Volován, from their album Monitor. She also featured in Aleks Syntek's video Historia de Danzón, alongside other well-known stars. The following year, she was invited to join the popular television series El Pantera, playing the role of Rosaura alongside Luis Roberto Guzmán. She also participated in short independent films directed by her friend Joel Nuñez, including El Secuestro and Chiles Xalapeños. At the same time, she appeared in the episode “Mónica, Acorralada” from the first season of the series Mujeres asesinas, produced by Pedro Torres.

Also in 2008, she filmed the movie Victorio, playing a sex worker who lives among Central American gang members. The film, directed by Alex Noppel, premiered at the Expresión en Corto Film Festival that year. Although it had limited theatrical release, Victorio earned Irán Castillo a nomination for the Ariel Award in 2011.

In 2009, she portrayed a photographer in the film Cabeza de Buda. She also did voiceover work for the animated Mexican film Sabel Redemption, and appeared in the thriller Viernes de ánimas, which premiered at the Riviera Maya Film Festival. That same year, she was the face of the “Hidalgo en la piel” tourism campaign for the state of Hidalgo. Irán also supported fellow actor Aarón Díaz by performing in his musical show at a bar in Mexico City. She returned to the stage at the end of the year in the play 12 mujeres en pugna, produced by Jorge Ortiz de Pinedo, and also in the stage adaptation of Hitchcock's The 39 Steps, alongside Arath de la Torre.

In early 2010, she joined the cast of the stage production El Mago de Oz 2010, replacing actress Susana González. That same year, Irán prepared to form a trip-hop band called Desert Monday with friends in Playa del Carmen. The group recorded songs in English, released them on MySpace, and performed live locally. Also in 2010, she collaborated again with Disney Latin America to record two main songs for Tinkerbell: Hadas al Rescate, and reprised her role as the voice of Jessie in Toy Story 3. In mid-2010, she began filming the romantic comedy 31 días, directed by Erika Grediaga in Guadalajara, which would be released in January 2013.

In 2011, she acted in the short films Verde and Contraluz: fotografía un momento que no puedes ver, both produced by Tecnológico de Monterrey. She also premiered the horror film Viernes de ánimas. That year, she co-hosted the television program Arriba el Telón with Gerardo Quiroz, showcasing theater listings and related interviews. In the final quarter of the year, Irán gave birth to her first daughter, whom she named Irka, meaning “when the sun rises.”

The following year, she starred in the horror film Morgana, and won first place in the dance competition Mi Sueño es Bailar on Estrella TV. That same year, she was invited by Venevisión to star in the police drama series Los secretos de Lucía alongside Colombian actor Juan Pablo Raba. After a year of filming, the series premiered simultaneously in Mexico and Venezuela.

== 2014–2017: Return to music – Amanecer ==
In 2014, Irán began recording what would become her third studio album after a 15-year hiatus from music. The album, titled Amanecer, was released independently and produced by Joan Romagosa and Federico Vega, the latter of whom co-wrote most of the songs with her. The first single, “Sabes Que,” featured a music video directed by Ricardo Trabulsi, who also shot the album's photography. The song was well received on digital platforms, helped by her renewed public profile following her appearance as a finalist on the reality show Bailando por un sueño.

She was also cast as the lead in the musical Vaselina, playing Sandy for the third time in her career. In 2015, she made a guest appearance in the telenovela Que te perdone Dios, while continuing to promote her album with the second single, “Libertad,” a song written by her mother, Martha Pinzón. The music video was filmed in Acapulco.

On stage, she starred in Amor de mis amores by Manolo Caro, as well as in the plays Chamaco, Cita a Ciegas at Foro Shakespeare, and Blanca Nieves, a children's musical. She also appeared in the comedy series El Torito for Claro Video.

In 2016, she appeared in the biographical series Hasta que te conocí and Por siempre Joan Sebastian, based on the lives of singers Juan Gabriel and Joan Sebastian, respectively. She also starred in the crime drama Perseguidos, once again acting alongside Mauricio Islas.

In 2017, she formally returned to telenovelas with El bienamado, alongside Jesús Ochoa, Chantal Andere, and Nora Salinas, produced by Nicandro Díaz González for Televisa. She also returned to the stage as part of the 90's Pop Tour, performing alongside acts such as OV7, Aleks Syntek, JNS, Caló, Pablo Ruiz, and Ernesto D'Alessio. She joined the tour performing her most iconic 1990s songs such as “Yo por él,” “Por ti, por mí” (with JNS), and “Sola” (with OV7), touring across Mexico and the United States. She remained with the tour for a year and a half before leaving in 2018.

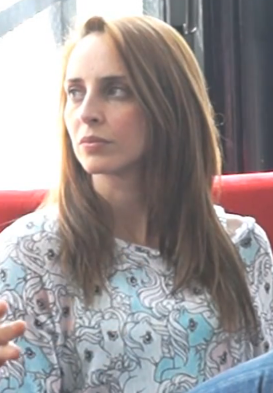
Irán Castillo in 2015.

== 2018–2021: Healing music ==
In 2018, Irán returned to television with guest roles in the comedy series Según Bibi and 40 y 20. She also portrayed “Vanessa Espinoza” in the third season of El Chapo, a character based on actress Kate del Castillo.

On stage, she joined the cast of Estelas del Narco, alongside actresses Gala Montes, Ximena Herrera and Lisa Owen, and starred in the children's play El lápiz de Sebastián, replacing Consuelo Duval. In 2019, she appeared in the film Solteras, and starred in the Telemundo series Decisiones: Unos ganan, otros pierden, produced by Argos Comunicación. She also returned to voice Jessie the cowgirl in Toy Story 4.

Musically, she began a new phase focused on “healing music,” visiting children's hospitals and performing with specific sound frequencies to promote well-being. She released a ho'oponopono-inspired version of “Lo Siento, Perdón, Gracias, Te Amo” on YouTube, followed by original songs such as “Madre, te amo” and “Código Sagrado.” She also composed “Fuerza México” in response to the 2017 earthquake in Mexico, and “Hoy me levanto” during the COVID-19 pandemic in 2020. That same year, she released a kundalini yoga song titled “Eterno Sol,” a cover of Balwant Kaur and Gurinder Singh, and launched her own meditation channel on YouTube, Ekata Meditaciones.

In the pop genre, she released a digital cover of “De Repente” by the late Colombian singer Soraya, and later, a version of “Mujer que bota fuego” originally by Manuel Medrano and Natalia Jiménez. Alongside her sister, she also performed “Dreams” by The Cranberries.

At the end of 2019, she filmed the movie Sin Copa alongside Osvaldo de León, and joined the cast of the television series Los pecados de Bárbara. In 2020, she began the year with stage productions such as Habitación 306, and Fiebre de Sábado por la Noche. Both productions were suspended shortly after their premieres due to the COVID-19 pandemic.

Mid-year, she began filming the telenovela La mexicana y el güero for Televisa, and joined the second season of the Telemundo series Enemigo íntimo, starring Fernanda Castillo. She also participated in the short film La peste del insomnio, inspired by the novel One Hundred Years of Solitude by Gabriel García Márquez. At the end of the year, she released the single “Sanación divina” as part of her healing music project.

In 2021, she joined the cast of the reboot Dr. Cándido Pérez, playing “Silvina,” a role originally portrayed by Nuria Bages. She also appeared in episode 5 of Amarres, the first Mexican original series for HBO Max. In the second half of the year, she starred in the telenovela S.O.S me estoy enamorando alongside Daniel Arenas for Televisa. Musically, she released the ballad “Después de tanto tiempo” and collaborated with Agrupación Cariño on the track “Me Muero.”

== 2022–present: El Castillo de Irán and podcast ==
In 2022, during the final stages of filming the telenovela S.O.S me estoy enamorando, Irán revealed her second pregnancy. After the show ended, she took time to become a certified doula and began assisting in childbirths, incorporating healing music into the experience. After giving birth to her son, Demian, she released a new version of her song “Código Sagrado” alongside her partner Pepe Ramos, featuring their baby in the music video. She also promotes humanized birth through online courses for pregnant women.

Professionally, she played “Flor” in the HBO Max series Las Bravas, alongside Mauricio Ochmann, and reprised her role in the musical Fiebre de Sábado por la Noche. She also appeared on the reality show ¿Quién es la máscara? as “Geisha,” finishing in seventh place. She also toured with Soundtrack: La Gira, performing her 1990s hits.

In 2023, she released the healing song “El Perdón,” and in October launched her family-friendly music project El Castillo de Irán, alongside her partner Pepe Ramos. The project includes original children's songs, lullabies, and covers of classic kids' music, distributed on YouTube Kids and digital platforms. Songs like “El mundo de los sueños” and “Gracias” went viral online and sparked widespread commentary.

In 2024, she and Pepe Ramos launched a podcast titled Me late ser humano, focusing on motivational stories and interviews with public figures, such as actress Michelle Renaud, who served as the podcast's "godmother".

On stage, she starred in the children's musical School of Rock with Diego de Erice. She also starred in the Vix series Juegos interrumpidos alongside Jorge Salinas and Silvia Navarro. On the big screen, she appeared in the comedy film Mesa de regalos.

In 2025, she returned to the stage as a solo artist with the concert Tiempos Nuevos, celebrating 28 years since the release of her debut album of the same name. That same year, she released the single “Voy a casarme conmigo,” described as a follow-up to her 1997 hit “Yo por él.” The music video featured actor Francisco Rubio, who also appeared in the original. The song explores themes of self-love and emotional maturity.

She also filmed the family comedy Familia a la Deriva, starring Mauricio Ochmann. Filming took place in Campeche and Ciudad del Carmen, highlighting the region's natural beauty. The film is expected to premiere in 2026.

== Personal life ==
In 2003, Castillo stepped away from the spotlight to embark on a personal journey to India, where she deepened her practice of meditation and yoga, disciplines she continues to practice today. In 2006, she lived temporarily in Vancouver, Canada, while studying English at CSLI and participating in independent short films such as Bittersweet Sin-phony.

Her first daughter, Irka Castillo, was born in October 2011, from a previous relationship with Gabriel Castañeda.

In 2015, she was kidnapped for three days in Mexico City after leaving a theater performance. Friends and family helped resolve the situation, including singer Gloria Trevi, who contributed financially to the ransom. In a later interview, Castillo revealed that she experienced Stockholm syndrome, which initially caused her to hesitate in cooperating with authorities. With psychological therapy, she was able to heal from the incident.

In February 2022, at age 45, she became a mother for the second time, with her partner Pepe Ramos, advocating for humanized birth.

== Discography ==
=== Albums ===
- Tiempos Nuevos (1997)
- Tatuada en tus besos (1999)
- "Amanecer" (2014)

== Singles ==
Tiempos Nuevos (1997)

- Yo Por El
- Locos De Amor
- La Flor Del Paraíso

Tatuada en tus besos (1999)

- Por Ti, Por Mi
- Sola
- No Vendrá
- Di Que No
- Y Pienso En Ti

Amanecer (2014)

- Sabes Que
- Libertad

Others

- Voy A Casarme Conmigo (2025)
- Me Muero (2021)
- Después de Tanto Tiempo (2021)
- Que Hable El Amor (2020)
- Dreams (2020)
- Mujer que bota fuego (2019)
- De Repente (2018)
- Amandote from Confidente de Secundaria (1995)
- Confidente De Secundaria from Confidente De Secundaria (1995)
- Feliz Navidad from Estrellas de Navidad (1997)
- Girando En El Tiempo from Preciosa (1998)

== Filmography ==
=== Films ===
| Year | Title | Role | Notes |
|---|---|---|---|
| 1998 | ¡Qué vivan los muertos! | | |
| 1999 | Toy Story 2 | Jessie | Latin American Spanish dubbing |
| 1999 | La segunda noche | Rosalía | |
| 2002 | El tigre de Santa Julia | Gloria Galicia | |
| 2006 | Amor xtremo | Melisa | |
| 2006 | Efectos secundarios | Gabriela | |
| 2007 | El secuestro | Diana | Television film |
| 2008 | Chiles xalapeños | Sarita | |
| 2008 | Victorio | Gabriela | Nominated - Ariel Award for Best Actress |
| 2009 | Sabel Redemption | Isha | |
| 2009 | Cabeza de buda | Angélica | |
| 2010 | Contraluz | Ximena | Short film |
| 2011 | Viernes de Ánimas: El camino de las flores | | |
| 2011 | Bittersweet Sin-phony | Sophia | Short film |
| 2012 | Morgana | Daniela | |
| 2013 | 31 días | Eva Sagarrondo | |
| 2019 | Solteras | Ilse | |
| 2021 | The Exorcism of God | Magali | |

=== Television ===
| Year | Title | Role | Notes |
|---|---|---|---|
| 1990 | Ángeles blancos | Biela | |
| 1991-1997 | Mujer, casos de la vida real | Various roles | 5 episodes |
| 1993 | El club de Gaby | | |
| 1993 | Entre la vida y la muerte | Anita | |
| 1994 | Agujetas de color de rosa | Cecilia | Main role |
| 1994 | ¡Qué chavas! | | |
| 1994 | Más allá del puente | Irán | |
| 1995-1996 | Retrato de familia | Cristina Preciado Mariscal | Main role |
| 1996 | Confidente de secundaria | Jackie | Lead role |
| 1997 | Mi pequeña traviesa | Preciosa | |
| 1998 | Preciosa | Preciosa Ruiz | Lead role |
| 1998 | Soñadoras | Ana Linares | Main role |
| 2000 | Locura de amor | Natalia Sandoval | Lead role |
| 2001 | El derecho de nacer | Isabel Cristina Armenteros del Junco | Main role |
| 2001 | Aventuras en el tiempo | Azusena | |
| 2002 | Clase 406 | Magdalena Rivera | |
| 2004 | Amar otra vez | Rocío Huertas Guzmán | Lead role |
| 2005–2006 | Alborada | Catalina Escobar y Díaz | Main role |
| 2006–2007 | Mundo de fieras | Cecilia | 12 episodes |
| 2007–2009 | El Pantera | Rosaura | 16 episodes |
| 2008 | Mujeres asesinas | Mónica Fernández | Episode: "Mónica, acorralada" |
| 2013 | Los secretos de Lucía | Lucia Reina | Lead role |
| 2015 | Que te perdone Dios | Young Renata | 5 episodes |
| 2016 | Por Siempre Joan Sebastian | Celina Esparza (Alina Espin) | 5 episodes |
| 2016 | Hasta que te conocí | María Romero | |
| 2017 | El bienamado | Santina Samperio | Main role |
| 2020 | Los pecados de Bárbara | Georgina "Coqui" Godínez | Main role |
| 2020 | Enemigo íntimo | Carmen Govea | Main role (Season 2) |
| 2020–2021 | La mexicana y el güero | Gladys Carmona | Supporting role |
| 2021-2022 | S.O.S me estoy enamorando | Sofia Fernandez | Lead role |
| 2023 | El colapso | Eva | Episode: "La comunidad" |
| 2024-2025 | Juegos interrumpidos | Melissa Suárez | Main role |
| 2025 | Mi verdad oculta | Nuria Campuzano de Lizárraga | Supporting role |
