= Sussan Taunton =

Mexican actress (born 1970)

- Born: Sussan Grace Taunton Thomas; February 13, 1970 (age 56); Santiago, Chile
- Height: 5 ft 8 in (1.73 m)
- Spouse: Jorge Levy

Sussan Grace Taunton Thomas (Spanish: [ˈsusaŋ ˈɡɾejs ˈtonton ˈtomas, - ˈtawnton -], (Note: In isolation, Sussan and Grace are pronounced Spanish pronunciation: [ˈsusan] and Spanish pronunciation: [ɡɾejs] respectively.) popularly known as Sussan Taunton; born February 13, 1970) is a Chilean-born Mexican actress.

== Early life and education ==
Taunton Thomas was born to Chilean descendants of British settlers, and has four siblings. She revealed in July 1999 in the late show Otro Rollo with Adal Ramones that she was kidnapped for over 2 months when she was 12 years old in Durango, Mexico.

She studied acting at the Centro de Educación Artística of Televisa for over 3 years. Her classmates included Jorge Salinas.

== Career ==
Taunton began her career as an actress with a small participation in 1990 in the telenovela El milagro de vivir, produced by Televisión Nacional de Chile; this was the first telenovela produced by the state network after the end of the military dictatorship in Chile.

She came to Mexico seeking for an opportunity in 1988 and became an instant hit, having notable roles in the most important soap operas of Televisa. She has made over a hundred TV commercials throughout her career, some being the spokeswoman of important brands such as Calvin Klein Latin America, Marinela (Bimbo), Scribe (notenooks) and magazines such as Vogue and Hola Mexico.

She dated Diego Schoening, who wanted and helped her to become a member of Timbiriche but her rivalry with Paulina Rubio was stronger and the producers decided to keep Paulina and choose Thalia instead, moreover Taunton has performed in many important plays mainly in Mexico.

Taunton was nominated for a Latin Grammy in 1995.

== Personal life ==
Taunton is the partner of producer Jorge "Coco" Levy. She has two daughters with Claudio Antonovich.

== Telenovelas ==
- El milagro de vivir (1990) .... Martita
- La picara soñadora (1991) .... Agripina
- Mágica juventud (1992–1993) .... Claudia
- Dos mujeres, un camino (1993–1994) .... Susy
- Volver a Empezar (1994–1995) .... Rita
- El premio mayor (1995–1996) .... Déborah Domenzáin
- Luz Clarita (1996–1997) .... Érika Lomelí
- Camila (1998–1999) .... Renata
- El niño que vino del mar (1999) .... Bernardette Fontaner
- Cuando me enamoro (2010–2011) .... Luciana Peniche
- Esperanza del corazón (2011–2012) .... Karyme
- Porque el amor manda (2012–2013) .... Delia Torres
- Por siempre mi amor (2013–2014) .... Lorenza
- Mi corazón es tuyo (2014–2015) .... Doctora
- Pasión y poder (2015–2016) .... Agripina
