= Los hijos de nadie =

- Genre: Telenovela
- Created by: Miguel Sabido
- Screenplay by: Kary Fajer; Rosa Ana Curiel; Enrique Alfaro
- Directed by: Pedro Damián; Karina Duprez
- Starring: Alpha Acosta; Ramón Abascal; Yolanda Andrade; Rossie Montenegro
- Music by: Belén-Teresa Oller
- Opening theme: "Los hijos de nadie" by Rossie Montenegro
- Country of origin: Mexico
- Original language: Spanish
- No. of seasons: 1
- No. of episodes: 85

Production
- Executive producers: Miguel Sabido; Irene Sabido
- Producer: Esteban Osorio
- Cinematography: Alberto Cárdenas
- Production company: Televisa

Original release
- Network: Canal de las Estrellas
- Release: February 24 – June 20, 1997

Los hijos de nadie (English title: Nobody's Children) is a Mexican juvenile telenovela produced by Irene Sabido for Televisa in 1997. This telenovela was a way to raise awareness among society regarding the serious issue of street children. This telenovela was supported by UNICEF.

On February 24, 1997, Canal de las Estrellas started broadcasting Los hijos de nadie weekdays at 5:00pm, replacing Luz Clarita. The last episode was broadcast on June 20, 1997, with El alma no tiene color replacing it the following Monday.

Silvia Derbez, Alpha Acosta, Ramón Abascal, and Rossie Montenegro starred as protagonists, while Yolanda Andrade starred as the main antagonist.

== Plot ==
Doña Leonor lives happily with the only family she has; her daughter and her granddaughter. However, both are killed in a tragic accident, leaving Doña Leonor distraught. To combat her loneliness, she decides to be the mother figure for a group of street children.

Verónica is a noble young woman who loves entertaining the street children with her marionettes; this is in sharp contrast to Lucila Villarreal, who begins manifesting extreme hatred towards the children for a prank they pulled by ruining the cake on her wedding day. Lucila's hatred is so intense that she declares war on the children, particularly Rosi, and begins exploiting them and making their lives miserable. Little by little, her attacks intensify and rise to the level of cruelty; she also begins obsessing over Veronica's boyfriend Francisco and plots to separate him from Veronica.

In light of her hatred towards any children, Lucila becomes pregnant but then decides to abort the fetus, rendering her barren. Losing touch with reality, Lucila begins exhibiting a pattern of violent behavior, killing Lourdes and then framing Veronica for the murder to separate her from Francisco. As time passes and the truth is revealed, Lucila completely loses her sanity and begins wandering the streets of Mexico in her wedding dress, eventually making her way to Francisco and Veronica's wedding, where she is taken away and institutionalized. The street children are relieved at the removal of Lucila from their lives, and they celebrate the union of Francisco and Veronica, along with the new hope for a better future they have before them.

== Cast ==
- Silvia Derbez as Doña Leonor
- Alpha Acosta as Verónica
- Ramón Abascal as Francisco
- Rossie Montenegro as Rosi/Angelita
- Yolanda Andrade as Lucila Villarreal
- Miguel Ángel Ghigliazza as Justino
- Ricardo Blume as Don Chuy
- Tere Velázquez as Tere
- Martha Ofelia Galindo as Celes
- Rosa de Castilla as Amparo
- Jorge Antolín as Vinicio
- Claudia Vega as Brenda
- Juan Carlos Barreto as Felipe
- Sergio Sendel as Mauricio
- Mariana Seoane as Carolina
- Evelyn Solares as Mela
- Carola Vázquez as Micaela
- Fabiola Campomanes as Lourdes
- Marco Zapata as Charal
- Goyo as Triques
- Yamiro as Muelas
- Alondra Torres as Pelos
- Luis Daniel as Luis
- Liuba de Lasse as Almendra
- Ulises Pliego as Miguel Ángel (child)
- Germán Robles as Germán
- Jorge del Campo as Antenor Villarreal
- Luis Cárdenas as Pablo
- Rocío Sobrado as Melisa
- Estela Barona as Evelia
- Sergio Acosta as Arturo
- Maripaz García as Sandra
- Lucía Paillés as Otilia
- Ricardo de Pascual as Rosendo
- Arturo García Tenorio as Roberto
- Roberto Sen as José
- Amelia Zapata as Emma
- Zayda Castellón as Tres Vueltas
- Malusa Munguía as Jose/Josefina
- Magda Karina as Yolanda
- Lourdes Canale as Martha
- Renata Flores as Teacher
