= Las secretas intenciones =

Mexican telenovela

- Genre: Telenovela
- Created by: Alberto Rudich
- Directed by: Francisco Franco
- Starring: Cristián Castro; Yolanda Andrade; Helena Rojo
- Theme music composer: Annette Fradera
- Opening theme: "Instrumental"
- Country of origin: Mexico
- Original language: Spanish
- No. of episodes: 80

Production
- Executive producer: Lucy Orozco
- Cinematography: Carlos Sánchez Zúñiga

Original release
- Network: Canal de las Estrellas
- Release: August 17 – November 27, 1992

Related
- Mágica juventud

Las secretas intenciones is a Mexican telenovela produced by Lucy Orozco for Televisa in 1992. It stars Cristián Castro and Yolanda Andrade with Helena Rojo, Silvia Pasquel and David Ostrosky as the main antagonists.

== Cast ==
- Cristián Castro as Miguel Ángel Curiel
- Yolanda Andrade as Larissa Cardenal
- Helena Rojo as Antonieta Alcántara
- Silvia Pasquel as Olivia Cardenal
- Enrique Rocha as Doctor Daniel Baguer
- Blanca Sánchez as Carolina Curiel
- Orlando Carrió as Carlos Cardenal
- Claudio Brook as Óscar Arteaga
- Juan Carlos Colombo as José Manuel Curiel
- Laura Almela as Georgina Alcántara
- Alejandra Procuna as Clara Cardenal
- Rodolfo Árias as Salvador "Chava"
- Felipe Casillas as Néstor
- Juan Ángel Esparza as Guillermo
- Andrés García Jr. as Arturo
- David Ostrosky as Dr. Gilberto Fuentes
- Mariagna Prats as Esperanza
- Ninón Sevilla as Julieta
- Anna Ciocchetti as Diana
- Verónica Langer as Paty
- Alberto Estrella

== Transmission ==
From Monday May 10, 1993 through Friday August 6th, 1993 Univision showed 'Las secretas intenciones' weekday afternoons replacing La traidora with Clarisa replacing it the following day.

From Monday August 12, 2002 through Friday November 1st, 2002 TLNovelas showed 'Las secretas intenciones' weekdays replacing Lazos de Amor with Imperio de cristal replacing it the following day.
