= Retrato de familia (TV series) =

Mexican telenovela television series

- Genre: Telenovela; Romance; Drama
- Created by: Jesús Calzada
- Written by: Jesús Calzada; Humberto Robles; Rosario Velicia
- Directed by: Francisco Franco
- Starring: Helena Rojo; Alfredo Adame; Diana Bracho; Yolanda Andrade; Raúl Araiza; Saby Kamalich; Alicia Montoya; Alejandro Tommasi; Irán Castillo; Claudio Brook; Regina Torné
- Theme music composer: Annette Fradera; Pepe Stephens
- Opening theme: "Retrato"
- Ending theme: "Vals"
- Country of origin: Mexico
- Original language: Spanish
- No. of episodes: 60

Production
- Executive producer: Lucy Orozco
- Producer: Maika Bernard
- Production locations: Filming; Televisa San Ángel; Mexico City, Mexico; Locations; Guadalajara, Jalisco, Mexico
- Cinematography: Jesús Nájera Saro
- Running time: 42-44 minutes 21-22 minutes
- Production company: Televisa

Original release
- Network: Canal de las Estrellas
- Release: 23 October 1995 – 19 January 1996

Related
- El secreto (2001)

Retrato de familia (Family Portrait) is a Mexican telenovela produced by Lucy Orozco for Televisa in 1995.

The series stars Helena Rojo, Alfredo Adame, Diana Bracho, Yolanda Andrade, Raúl Araiza, Saby Kamalich, Alicia Montoya, Alejandro Tommasi, Irán Castillo, Claudio Brook and Regina Torné.

== Plot ==
Pilar de Mariscal (Saby Kamalich) and her two daughters, Cecilia (Helena Rojo) and Irene (Diana Bracho), live in the city of Guadalajara. Cecilia is married to Agustín Preciado (Julián Pastor) with whom she has three children: Elvira (Yolanda Andrade), Octavio (Aitor Iturrioz) and Cristina (Irán Castillo). Despite the bad relationship between Cecilia and Agustín, she always tries to ensure the well-being of her children. However, Elvira has despised her mother her entire life and instead idolizes her father and her aunt, Irene.

Irene is married to Álvaro (Alejandro Rábago), a very promising architect. However, Irene's impatience to achieve a good social position and the fact that they did not marry for love, but that their marriage was arranged by Doña Pilar, causes the couple to drift apart. In fact, Irene has always been secretly in love with Agustín and they have been lovers for years.

Years later Cecilia and Agustín get divorced and he leaves the family home. Elvira has become the worst enemy of her mother and an ally of her aunt. Mother and daughter grow even further apart when they both fall in love with the same man, the young doctor Esteban Acuña (Alfredo Adame).

Elvira becomes obsessed with Esteban and even more so when he confesses to her that he loves Cecilia. That obsession leads her to leave Diego (Raúl Araiza), her lifelong boyfriend. On the other hand, Agustín goes to Esteban's clinic due to serious health problems, but he ends up dying. Elvira mistakenly believes that Esteban and Cecilia murdered her father, so she begins a revenge against her own mother and the man she claimed to love.

== Cast ==
- Helena Rojo as Cecilia Mariscal
- Alfredo Adame as Esteban Acuña
- Diana Bracho as Irene Mariscal
- Yolanda Andrade as Elvira Preciado Mariscal
- Raúl Araiza as Diego Corona
- Saby Kamalich as Pilar Viuda de Mariscal
- Alicia Montoya as Candelaria
- Alejandro Tommasi as Nicolás Negrete
- Irán Castillo as Cristina Preciado Mariscal
- Claudio Brook as Gabino Acuña
- Regina Torné as Miriam de Acuña
- Nicky Mondellini as Patricia Cortés
- Julián Pastor as Agustín Preciado
- Ana María Aguirre as Nora de Corona
- Rodolfo Arias as Julián Bárcenas
- Mariana Ávila as Mónica Bárcenas
- Julio Bracho as Raúl
- Fabiola Campomanes as Malena
- Álvaro Carcaño as Antonio Mercader
- Andrés García Jr. as Joaquín Acuña
- Aitor Iturrioz as Octavio Preciado Mariscal
- Verónica Langer as Mercedes de la Canal
- Martha Navarro as Rosario de Bárcenas
- Mercedes Pascual as Leonarda "Narda" Viuda de Negrete
- Alejandro Rábago as Álvaro Balcázar
- Abraham Ramos as Jaime
- Héctor Sáez as Sebastián Corona
- Mariana Seoane as Araceli
- Theo Tapia as Honorio Bárcenas

== Awards and nominations ==
Year	Award	Category	Nominee	Result
1996	14th TVyNovelas Awards	Best Telenovela	Lucy Orozco	Nominated
1996	14th TVyNovelas Awards	Best Actress	Helena Rojo	Nominated
1996	14th TVyNovelas Awards	Best Antagonist Actress	Yolanda Andrade	Nominated
1996	14th TVyNovelas Awards	Best Antagonist Actor	Alejandro Tommasi	Nominated
1996	El Heraldo de México Awards	Best Telenovela	Lucy Orozco	Nominated
1996	El Heraldo de México Awards	Best Actress	Helena Rojo	Nominated
1996	El Heraldo de México Awards	Best Actor	Alfredo Adame	Nominated
