= Alpha Acosta =

Mexican actress

- Born: Colima, Colima, Mexico
- Occupation: Actress
- Years active: 1991-present

Alpha Acosta (born 21 January 1973), birth name Ana Alfa Christina Acosta Lucas, is a Mexican actress and assistant director best known for her roles in Morelia (1995), Dias de combate (1994) and Absuelto para matar (1995).

== Filmography ==
Television roles
Year	Title	Role	Notes
1992	Tenías que ser tú	Roxana	
1993	Televiteatros	Unknown role	
1993	Buscando el paraíso	Unknown role	
1994	Prisionera de amor	Mariana	
1995	Morelia	Morelia Solorzano Montero de Campos Miranda	Main role
1997	Los hijos de nadie	Verónica	85 episodes
1999	Romántica obsesión	Tamara	84 episodes
2001	Cara o cruz	Cony	
2003	La hija del jardinero	Consuelo Alcántara de Sotomayor	
2006-2007	La hija del mariachi	Teniente Guadalupe Morales	
2014	La Impostora	Valentina Altamira / Leticia	61 episodes
2016	Un día cualquiera	Mercedes	Episode: "El estrés y sus manías"
2018	Enemigo íntimo	Minerva Zambrano	
2018	Niños Asesinos	La Juez	
2018	José José, el príncipe de la canción	Anel	Main role

== Awards and nominations ==
Year	Award	Category	Telenovela	Result
1996	TVyNovelas Awards	Launching of the Year	Morelia	Nominated
