= Yolanda Andrade =

Mexican actress

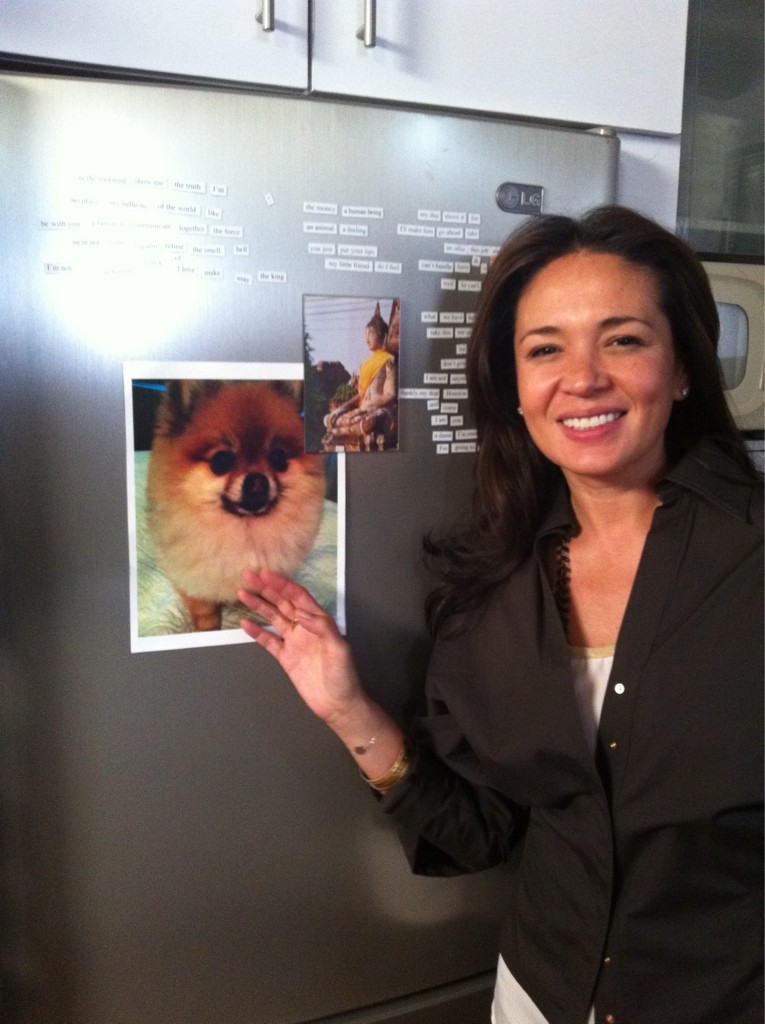
- Born: Yolanda Josefina Andrade Gómez; 28 December 1970 (age 55); Culiacán, Sinaloa, Mexico
- Occupations: Actress, television presenter

Yolanda Josefina Andrade Gómez (born 28 December 1970) is a Mexican actress and television presenter born in Culiacán, Sinaloa. She started her career at the telenovela Yo no creo en los hombres (1991), along with Gabriela Roel and Alfredo Adame, which allowed her to work in bigger productions such as Las secretas intenciones (1992) with Cristian Castro.

== Biography ==
Yolanda Josefina Andrade Gómez was born on 28 December 1970 in Culiacán, Sinaloa, Mexico. After completing high school there, she moved to Mexico City and started her acting studies at the Centro de Educación Artística (CEA) in Televisa for 3 years. Upon completion of her acting studies, she obtained her first role in a soap opera Yo no creo en los hombres. Her next role was as Larissa in Las secretas intenciones acting next to Cristian Castro, for which she obtained a TVyNovelas Award as Best Young Actress.

She then continued towards other soap operas until she obtained a leading role. Her first starring role was in Buscando el Paraíso (1993) with Karla Alvares and Alex Ibarra, then Retrato de Familia (1995); Sentimientos Ajenos (1996) with Carlos Ponce and Chantal Andere, Los Hijos de Nadie (1997) with Silvia Derbez and Ramón Abascal. On that same year she also participated in the Mexican movie ¿Quién Diablos es Juliette?.

Throughout her career, she received public and media attention and was awarded several “Best Actress” honors.

On March 1, 2000, Yolanda hosted the TV show Hijas de la Madre Tierra with her friend Montserrat Oliver. The show was very successful and they even did a special transmission from the 2000 Olympics in Sydney, Australia

Like many other Mexican celebrities, in 2003 she entered Big Brother VIP where she won second place after the winner Omar Chaparro.

== Television ==
=== Soap operas ===
- 1997: Los hijos de nadie – Lucila
- 1996: Sentimientos Ajenos – Sofia
- 1995: Retrato de Familia – Elvira
- 1994: Buscando el Paraiso – Dalia
- 1993: Las Secretas Intenciones – Larissa
- 1991: Yo no creo en los hombres – Clara

=== Drama shows ===
- 1995: Mujer, casos de la vida real – El Lugar Ideal
- 1994: Mujer, casos de la vida real – Perdon por Amor

=== Reality shows ===
- 2002: Big Brother VIP – as herself
- 2023: La lei de la serva (Netflix) – as herself

=== Variety shows ===
- 2007: Mojoe – as herself
- 2006: Netas Divinas – as herself
- 2005: Otro Rollo – as herself
- 2003: Gran Musical – as herself
- 2003: Las Hijas de la Madre Tierra – as herself
