= Dr. Cándido Pérez (2021 TV series) =

Mexican comedy television series

- Genre: Sitcom
- Based on: Dr. Cándido Pérez, señoras by Abel Santa Cruz
- Written by: Jorge Ortiz de Pinedo
- Starring: Arath de la Torre; Irán Castillo; Raquel Garza; Lorena de la Garza; Marcia Coutiño; David Ramos; Ana Paula del Moral
- Country of origin: Mexico
- Original language: Spanish
- No. of seasons: 1
- No. of episodes: 13

Production
- Executive producers: Jorge Ortiz de Pinedo; Pedro Ortiz de Pinedo
- Producer: Ramón Salomón
- Production company: Televisa

Original release
- Network: Las Estrellas; Univision
- Release: 13 June – 13 December 2021

Dr. Cándido Pérez is a Mexican comedy television series that premiered first in the United States on Univision on 13 June 2021. It is a reboot of the earlier series of the same name. It stars Arath de la Torre in the title role, alongside Irán Castillo, Raquel Garza, Lorena de la Garza, Marcia Coutiño, David Ramos, and Ana Paula del Moral.

== Premise ==
The comedy follows the young Dr. Cándido Pérez, a gynecologist who has to resist the temptation of his attractive patients before returning to his wife. This premise serves as the main source of tension, conflict, and comedy in the show.

== Cast ==
- Arath de la Torre as Dr. Cándido Pérez
- Irán Castillo as Silvina
- Raquel Garza as Doña Cata
- Lorena de la Garza as Claudia
- Marcia Coutiño as Paula
- David Ramos as Father Camilo
- Ana Paula del Moral as Perlita

== Production ==
The sitcom was announced on 15 October 2020 at Visión21 upfront. The main cast was revealed on 1 March 2021, with production beginning the same day. A total of 13 episodes have been confirmed. In Mexico, the series was pulled from the Domingos de sofá Sunday block after 7 episodes. On 19 August 2021, it was announced that the series would move to the Noche de buenas weekday block in October 2021.

== Episodes ==
| No. | Title | Mexico air date | U.S. air date | Mexico viewers (millions) | U.S. viewers (millions) |
|---|---|---|---|---|---|
| 1 | "Cándido" | 18 July 2021 | 13 June 2021 | 1.5 | 0.81 |
| 2 | "El premio y el tesorito" | 18 July 2021 | 20 June 2021 | 1.5 | 0.89 |
| 3 | "Silvina agente inmobiliario" | 18 July 2021 | 27 June 2021 | 1.5 | 0.68 |
| 4 | "La evaluación" | 25 July 2021 | 4 July 2021 | 1.0 | 0.60 |
| 5 | "El collar de aniversario" | 25 July 2021 | 8 August 2021 | 1.0 | 0.70 |
| 6 | "Muestra gratis" | 8 August 2021 | 15 August 2021 | 1.3 | 0.73 |
| 7 | "Secreto de confesión" | 8 August 2021 | 22 August 2021 | 1.3 | 0.75 |
| 8 | "Espíritus y crepas" | 18 November 2021 | 29 August 2021 | 1.3 | 0.76 |
| 9 | "Cuidado con la Chucu" | 25 November 2021 | 5 September 2021 | 1.4 | 0.75 |
| 10 | "El fisgón" | 2 December 2021 | 12 September 2021 | N/A | 0.73 |
| 11 | "Doble sorpresa" | 9 December 2021 | 6 December 2021 | N/A | TBA |
| 12 | "Entre maletas y locas, las broncas no son pocas" | 16 December 2021 | 6 December 2021 | 1.6 | TBA |
| 13 | "Lo que Claudia se llevó" | 23 December 2021 | 13 December 2021 | N/A | TBA |
