= La otra familia =

2011 Mexican film

La Otra Familia
- Theatrical release poster
- Directed by: Gustavo Loza
- Screenplay by: Gustavo Loza
- Produced by: Gustavo Loza; Ricardo Kleinbaum
- Starring: Jorge Salinas; Luis Roberto Guzmán; Ana Serradilla; Bruno Loza; Carmen Salinas; Ana Soler; Nailea Norvind; Juan Ríos Cantú
- Edited by: Kris Fitzgerald
- Music by: Zbigniew Paleta
- Production companies: Fox International Productions; Río Negro Producciones; Barracuda Films
- Distributed by: 20th Century Fox
- Release date: May 25, 2011 (Mexico)
- Country: Mexico
- Language: Spanish

La otra familia is a 2011 Mexican family drama film starring Jorge Salinas, along with Luis Roberto Guzmán, Bruno Loza, Carmen Salinas and Ana Serradilla. It was directed and written by Gustavo Loza. The film was produced by the Black River Productions company and Barracuda Films. The filming began in 2010 in Saltillo, Coahuila and was released on March 25, 2011.

== Plot ==
Hendrix is the seven-year-old son of drug-addicted Nina. After she has left Hendrix home alone for three days, Nina's friend Ivana takes him away, but cannot house him. Instead, she gives him to her friends, Jean Paul and Chema, a well-to-do, stable, gay couple. At first, Chema bristles at the intrusion, and the couple's maid and gardener worry that homosexual men cannot make good role models for a young boy, but soon they become a warm, loving family. Meanwhile, Nina's drug-addicted lover and dealer Patrick decides that selling Hendrix would be a good way to pay off a debt to his own dealer. He helps Nina track down her son, and she insists on taking him away, although Hendrix wants to stay with his new family. While Nina is in a drug-induced stupor, Patrick takes Hendrix and sells him to a couple who are having marital problems after the loss of their infant son. Not long after the couple is left with Hendrix, the boy insists on calling his "dads", who come to get him. The husband, worried about gay men taking Hendrix, calls the police. The police arrest Jean Paul and Chema for kidnapping and sexual assault, though there is no evidence of abuse to hold them for long. Distraught over losing her son again, Nina overdoses and dies. Patrick, trying to meet with the husband again to get money, is arrested. In the end, Hendrix is returned to Jean Paul and Chema and allowed to resume a healthy life as their son.
