= S.O.S me estoy enamorando =

Mexican telenovela

- Genre: Telenovela
- Based on: El sodero de mi vida by Jorge Maestro and Ernesto Korovsky
- Developed by: Lucero Suárez; Edwin Valencia
- Written by: Carmen Sepúlveda; Luis Reynoso
- Directed by: Rubén Nelhiño Acosta; Juan Pablo Blanco
- Starring: Irán Castillo; Daniel Arenas; César Évora; Nuria Bages; Marcelo Córdoba; Ana Patricia Rojo; Yolanda Ventura
- Theme music composer: J. Eduardo Murguía; Mauricio L. Arriaga; José Luis Roma; Raúl Roma
- Opening theme: "Por fin me enamoré" by Río Roma
- Composers: Jordi Bachbush; Jorge Domínguez
- Country of origin: Mexico
- Original language: Spanish
- No. of seasons: 1
- No. of episodes: 97

Production
- Executive producer: Lucero Suárez
- Producer: Ángel Villaverde
- Editors: Mauricio Cortés; Norma Ramírez
- Production company: Televisa

Original release
- Network: Las Estrellas
- Release: 6 September 2021 – 16 January 2022

S.O.S me estoy enamorando (English: S.O.S I'm Falling In Love) is a Mexican telenovela that aired on Las Estrellas from 6 September 2021 to 16 January 2022. The series is produced by Lucero Suárez. It is an adaptation of the Argentine telenovela El sodero de mi vida, and stars Irán Castillo and Daniel Arenas. Production began on 31 May 2021.

== Plot ==
Alberto Muñoz must save the print shop that his family has had for several generations and must reach an agreement with his "new" partners. The deal, which seemed favorable, soon falls apart because the partners have other plans for the land where the shop sits on. Things get complicated when Alberto falls in love with Sofía, the daughter of one of the partners. The bond between them is deep, but they must overcome many obstacles to be happy.

== Cast ==
- Irán Castillo as Sofía Fernández
- Daniel Arenas as Alberto Muñoz Cano
- César Évora as Leopoldo Fernández
- Nuria Bages as Delia Muñoz Cano
- Marcelo Córdoba as Omar Kattan
- Ana Patricia Rojo as Inés Paredes Nava
- Yolanda Ventura as Elsa Fernández
- Juan Martín Jauregui as Diego Miranda
- Lourdes Reyes as Leonor Muñoz Cano
- Norma Lazareno as Eugenia Campoamor
- Alejandro Ibarra as Orlando Maqueto
- Óscar Bonfiglio as Miguel Escobedo
- Luz Edith Rojas as Fabiana
- Pierre Angelo as Raúl Peralta
- Pierre Louis as Daniel Soto
- Dari Romo as Romina Muñoz Cano
- Jorge Trejo Reyes as Nicolás Lozano
- Adriana Montes de Oca as Titi
- Candela Márquez as Mónica Muñoz Cano
- Rocío de Santiago as Cecilia
- Victoria Viera as Ana Fernández
- Manolo Bonfiglio as Chucho
- Pedro Prieto as Gotcha
- Siouzana Melikián as Laura Díaz
- Magda Karina as Martha
- José Carlos Femat as Sergio
- Leonardo Herrera as Federico "Fede" Miranda Fernández
- Jorge Salinas as Vicente Ramos

=== Recurring ===
- Tamara Vallarta as María
- Montserrat Marañón as Zulma
- Carlos Bracho as Estanislao
- Olivia Collins as Mima
- Herson Andrade as Luisito
- Ricardo Kleinbaum as Mario Trejo
- Sachi Tamashiro as Verónica
- Queta Lavat as Caridad
- Mauricio Abularach as Manolo
- Vanessa Acosta as Andrea
- Maya Ricote as Erika

== Ratings ==
Viewership and ratings per season of S.O.S me estoy enamorando
Season	Timeslot (CT)	Episodes	First aired		Last aired		Avg. viewers (millions)
Season	Timeslot (CT)	Episodes	Date	Viewers (millions)	Date	Viewers (millions)	Avg. viewers (millions)
1	Mon–Fri 6:30 p.m.	89 (Note: Should reflect the number of episodes that contribute to the average given in the last column.)	6 September 2021	2.5	16 January 2022	3.3	2.61

== Episodes ==
No.	Title	Original release date	Mexico viewers (millions)
1	"Como un ángel"	6 September 2021 (Note: Premiered early online through Las Estrellas website on 3 September 2021.)	2.5
Alberto saves Fede from a fire. Sofía explodes against the father of her son. Alberto suffers for the death of his brother. Alberto does not receive the loan from the bank. Fede tells the story of Captain Eagle at his school. Sofía suffers a mishap when she tries to avoid running over a dog just outside Alberto's silkscreen printing shop. The workshop is closed. Vicente and Laura meet. Fede is reunited with Alberto.
2	"Señales del destino"	7 September 2021	2.7
Sofía takes Fede to Alberto and Fede is very happy to see Captain Eagle. Alberto invites Sofía and Fede to his office and tells the story of his family and invites Sofía for coffee. Titi visits Alberto and tries to manipulate him to come back to her, but he makes it clear that it's over between them. Alberto receives a proposal to buy his land but does not accept it. Alberto invites Sofía on a date, but a medical emergency with Toño prevents him from seeing her and Sofía is disappointed. Fede suffers an accident.
3	"Coincidencias"	8 September 2021	2.8
Fede introduces his grandmother to Alberto and Sofía is happy to see him in the hospital. Alberto gets upset with Mónica because of her boyfriend Sergio. Leonor helps pay Toño's hospital expenses. Leopoldo looks for Alberto to make him a new purchase proposal. Leonor argues with Romina about why she doesn't want her to wear makeup. Laura decides to get even with Vicente for his bad mood.
4	"Estoy enamorado de ti"	9 September 2021	2.6
Leopoldo manages to convince Alberto to become partners. Ana continues to get into trouble at school. Cecy asks Alberto for a job and he accepts. Laura goes to Vicente's house to give him the book he forgot in the cafe. Romina sees the great chemistry between Laura and Vicente. Omar declares his love to Sofía. Romina decides to give Vicente a push to open his heart. Ana manages to get a school and there she meets Sofía.
5	"Tu corazón está libre"	10 September 2021	2.2
Alberto prepares to reopen the workshop, but Mónica is upset when she learns that he is going into partnership with strangers and did not ask for her opinion. Alberto invites Sofía to go for coffee again. Titi buys a pregnancy test. Leopoldo's double life begins to take its toll on him, but he decides to go through with his plan to get the land from Alberto's workshop. Titi discovers she is pregnant. Sofía and Alberto kiss.
6	"Me volví loca de amor"	13 September 2021	2.4
Sofía and Alberto give each other a kiss and Titi sees them and leaves very upset. Vicente is surprised to learn that his brother is very happy. Alberto decides to take the contract with him before signing it. Titi looks for Alberto and confesses that she is pregnant. Titi calls Sofía to tell her that the father of her child rejected her and she no longer wants to live. Titi threatens to take her own life if Alberto does not marry her; Sofía finds out and despises Alberto. Omar asks Alberto to stop looking for Sofía.
7	"No hay ningún nosotros"	14 September 2021	2.3
Alberto tries to clear things up with Sofía, but she rejects him and asks him to be careful of her father and Orlando, since it seems that they want to deceive him with one of the clauses of the contract. Titi looks for Sofía to demand that she leave Alberto alone. Alberto confesses his feelings to Leopoldo. Laura accompanies Vicente to the library. Sofía rejects Alberto's love, after Titi blackmails her. Fede registers 'Captain Eagle' for the competitions and he accepts. Miguel confronts Alberto. Leonor accepts that Romina attends school.
8	"Mónica es detenida"	15 September 2021	2.3
Alberto questions Sofía when he sees her near Omar. Nicolás receives help from Alberto to stay in the workshop while he finds his uncle. Mónica reports the robbery at her job. Ana seeks out Sofía to find comfort for her parents' rejection. Lieutenant Pedro arrests Mónica as the alleged culprit in the store robbery. Inés calls Sofía at home to postpone their date and Leopoldo becomes very nervous. Nicolás becomes ill.
9	"Ten cuidado con Omar"	16 September 2021	2.5
Gotcha explains to Alberto and Vicente what happened to him in Spain and how Marlene came into his life. Chucho visits Mónica in the police station and Romina is interested in Nicolás' life. Mónica is released when it is discovered that Sergio was the one who robbed the store. Laura brings a small gift to Vicente. Gotcha is happy to be at Alberto's house and Chucho is happy to see Mónica free. Alberto looks for Sofía to try to fix things and confesses his distrust of Omar.
10	"Al mal paso darle prisa"	17 September 2021	2.4
Omar prevents Alberto from seeing Sofía. Chucho suffers when he sees Mónica kissing Commander Pedro. Leopoldo promises to go to Sofía's appointment and confess the truth. Sofía learns that Alberto went to look for her and Omar did not tell her. The shop may be closed. Leopoldo and Inés are about to see Sofía but he pretends to feel sick. Leopoldo will no longer be Alberto's partner. Ana and Inés reject Leopoldo. Vicente humiliates Laura. Mónica accepts to be Pedro's girlfriend. Sofía puts a stop to Omar.
11	"La única verdad"	20 September 2021	2.2
Sofía makes it clear to Omar that she doesn't like lies. Laura receives bowling lessons from Dani. Leopoldo is about to be discovered by his wife while talking to Ana and Inés. Titi arrives at Alberto's house to demand asylum, but since he tells her to leave, Titi tells Sofía that Alberto asked her to abort the baby. Mónica looks for a job with Don Miguel. Alberto demands Titi to tell the truth in front of Sofía. Alberto shows up at the mini-Olympics. Vicente accepts that he is interested in Laura.
12	"Nunca te he dejado de querer"	21 September 2021	2.3
Fede and Alberto celebrate winning the mini Olympics. Laura cuts herself when the power goes out in the cafeteria, Vicente cures her and teaches her to read Braille, but due to a confusion Vicente gets upset with Laura. Sofía thanks Alberto for accompanying Fede. Delia shoots a bullet in the middle of a family reunion. After seeing Alberto's affection for Fede, Sofía decides to take a new path with Alberto and they kiss. Leopoldo discovers that Ana was at his house.
13	"Se acabaron las vacas flacas"	22 September 2021	2.2
Sofía and Alberto settle their differences and decide to give each other a chance in love. Romina suffers knowing that no one will ever love her, but Alberto talks to her and tries to explain. Laura makes a proposal to Vicente. Inés visits Elsa to tell her the truth. Alberto signs the contract with Orlando and Leopoldo. Titi arrives at the workshop celebration but Alberto makes her leave. Sergio looks for Mónica. Orlando and Leopoldo ask Alberto to reduce costs by firing some employees.
14	"El amor es ciego"	23 September 2021	2.1
Laura enters the Muñoz-Cano house to talk to Vicente, confesses her love and kisses him, but he does not react as she expected. Leonor asks Sofía for help for her daughter Romina. Vicente decides to leave the house to help Alberto. Fede is sad not to hear from his father and does not want to go to school. Romina learns that she will go to therapy with Sofía. Inés warns Leopoldo that Ana is coming home, so he hides between the armchairs. Sergio kisses Mónica and asks her to go away with him. Alberto has a great idea to cheer up Fede.
15	"Medidas drásticas"	24 September 2021	2.5
Captain Aguila and Pollito save the great Sansón. Mónica vents to Romina because she is confused by Sergio. Sofía receives a threatening letter from Ana's father. Alberto is furious to see the accountant who stole from him. Fede tells his friends how Captain Aguila and Pollito saved the great Sansón. Alberto confronts Orlando about the accountant who arrived at the workshop. Mónica decides to escape with Sergio to Córdoba, but the police intercept them. Inés tells Leopoldo to leave after receiving a humiliation.
16	"Por ti hago lo que sea"	27 September 2021	2.2
Mónica suffers from having helped Pedro so that Sergio could be arrested. Fede is happy to talk to his dad. Romina asks Nicolás to close his eyes and kisses Nicolás on the mouth. Alberto asks Laura to stay away from Vicente, as he will not be able to reciprocate her love. Omar hears that Sofía is going out with Alberto. Vicente complains to Alberto for talking to Laura and asks him to stay out of his life. Leonor does not understand Romina. Omar prevents Sofía from seeing Alberto, but he confronts him and they fight.
17	"Esa relación no iba a llegar a ningún lado"	28 September 2021	2.3
Alberto puts Omar in his place by hitting him. Vicente looks for Laura to confess his love. Pedro makes it clear to Mónica that he loves her well. Leopoldo looks for Inés to offer her an apology. Omar tries to win points with Fede and Sofía. Sofía doesn't understand why Alberto doesn't answer her calls and messages. Sofía and Alberto have a fight. Pedro proposes to Mónica. Inés is depressed to see that Leopoldo does not treat her the same as Elsa, so she decides to break up with him for good.
18	"No quiero a mi lado a un hombre violento"	29 September 2021	2.3
Inés decides to confess to her daughter that she is separating from Leopoldo. Sofía is upset to learn that Alberto hit Omar. Alberto seeks out Sofia to offer an apology, but Sofía complains that he hit Omar and decides to break up with him. Elsa takes Leopoldo to the doctor. Titi suffers an accident. Orlando causes the printing shop to lose a good client. Sofía is surprised to see that Alberto hit Orlando.
19	"Romina huye de la casa"	30 September 2021	2.5
Alberto beats up Orlando for ruining a sale of the workshop and Sofía ends up becoming more disappointed in him. Romina suffers from feeling that no one loves her. Mónica is happy about her marriage. Titi manages to move into Alberto's house. Anita vents to Sofía about her parents' separation. Leopoldo will have to undergo emergency surgery. Titi gets jealous when she sees Alberto with Leonor. The Muñoz-Cano family suffers when they see that Romina has left; they all go out to look for her.
20	"Nadie tiene la vida comprada"	1 October 2021	2.2
Romina comes clean with Vicente and tells him why she ran away from home. Sofía advises Leonor to be more understanding with her daughter. Leopoldo's health worsens and his life is in danger. Titi becomes a nuisance in Alberto's house. Leonor takes Romina to a specialist who prescribes he a medication. Inés learns that Leopoldo is in the hospital and runs to see him. Alberto finds Omar with Sofía at the hospital. Vicente asks Laura never to lie to him.
21	"Escucha mi corazón"	4 October 2021	2.2
Leopoldo asks Alberto to take good care of his family in case he is absent because his health condition is very serious. Alberto arrives by surprise at Sofía's office, the two cannot stand the tension between them and kiss passionately. Leopoldo is taken care of by Elsa, but receives a call from Inés and a visit. Vicente complains to Leonor for giving Romina pills, the reason is that she wants her to forget Nicolas.
22	"Quiero estar cerca de Fede"	5 October 2021	2.6
Diego returns unexpectedly to Sofía's life, however she is indignant with him because he never spoke to Fede until now. Diego will try to conquer Sofía again but she is already in love with Alberto. Inés feels guilty about Elsa's kindness. Vicente learns that he has been deceived. Leopoldo escapes from home to visit Inés. Elsa is not left in doubt and goes to Alberto directly to ask if her husband was with him.
23	"¿Por qué el amor duele tanto?"	6 October 2021	2.6
Miguel gets angry with Alberto for returning Titi to his house. Diego visits Sofía's house where Leopoldo receives him aggressively, but he has to calm down because Fede is there. Fede is very excited about Diego's arrival, so he will ask Alberto to stay away from his mother so that she and his father can be together again.
24	"Algo siempre se atraviesa"	7 October 2021	2.2
Sofía is furious to hear that Diego wants to stay with Fede and decides to go after her son. Laura is disappointed by Vicente's attitude and plans to return to her town. Fede wants to see his parents together again, but Sofía opposes because of her affection for Alberto. Ana unburdens herself to Sofía and tells her that her father is married to another woman. Claudia tells Vicente that Laura is about to return to her town. Leopoldo offers Diego money to stay away from his daughter and Fede. Vicente tries to fix his situation with Laura, but it is too late. Alberto urges Vicente to look for Laura. Orlando does his job and the workshop suffers a short circuit that completely affects production. Leopoldo is about to be discovered by his daughters. Fede gets terrible news when he learns that he will no longer be able to see his father.
25	"Un golpe definitivo"	8 October 2021	2.3
Leopoldo can't stand that his grandson Fede is so excited for his father Diego. Vicente and Laura get together again. The trip that Diego was planning is cancelled because Sofía has already made the decision to take him out of her life. Alberto will have to keep Sofía out of his life for a while because of Fede. Anita will discover Leopoldo's secret. Diego will take Fede away.
26	"Mi papá se fue por tu culpa"	11 October 2021	2.1
Diego will deceive Fede by lying to him that Sofía does not want him to see him anymore. Vicente manages to find Laura in her town and she will forgive him. Leopoldo's lies leave him more and more at risk. Fede is very hurt to think that he will never see his father again because of Sofía. Elsa begins to suspect that Leopoldo is unfaithful.
27	"No te quiero ver nunca más"	12 October 2021	2.2
Fede is very hurt at the thought that he will never see his father again and blames Sofía. Orlando wants to enforce the clause in the contract to keep Alberto's business. Romina celebrates with her family that she passed her exam. Elsa continues to suspect that Leopoldo is unfaithful. Sofía complains to Diego for not communicating with Fede. Elsa continues to investigate Leopoldo and confuses things. Daniel kisses Leonor. Pedro wants to throw a party to formally ask for Mónica's hand.
28	"Todo fue un error"	13 October 2021	2.4
Elsa confronts Leopoldo about his infidelity and ends up running him out of the house. Inés looks for Elsa and learns that Leopoldo is with someone else. Inés decides to break up with Leopoldo for good and Vicente is uncomfortable when his ex seeks him out at the café to ask him for a favor. Laura is confused by Vicente's reaction. Elsa accepts that she made a mistake and apologizes to Leopoldo. Romina organizes a party at her house without permission. Chucho is arrested for hitting some men who were bothering Mónica.
29	"Me quiero ir a vivir con mi papá"	14 October 2021	1.9
Omar suffers an accident that leaves him with several injuries. Alberto looks for Gocha to help him against Orlando. Fede is very happy when his father comes to pick him up. Laura is upset by Vicente's attitude and he gives her an explanation. Inés and Diego meet. Leonor accepts that Romina goes out with Nicolás.
30	"Me muero de la tristeza"	15 October 2021	1.9
Sofía suffers because of Fede's decision to move in with Diego. Inés complains to Leopoldo for not confronting Sofía. Elsa and Leopoldo suffer because Sofía accepts Fede's decision to go with his father. Romina goes out with a friend and finds her mother very affectionate with Daniel. Fede is ready to leave with his dad, but neither Sofía nor his grandparents are ready to say goodbye. Sofía suffers for Fede's departure and looks for Alberto to find comfort and they end up giving in to passion. Laura confronts Paula. Gocha gives Alberto bad news.
31	"Una tremenda golpiza"	18 October 2021	2.1
Pedro surprises Mónica by showing her the apartment he bought for when they live together. Alberto finds Paula all beaten up and helps her. Alberto takes Paula home, Vicente and Sofía support her in reporting the beatings she received. Ana is uncomfortable seeing Diego with her mother. Laura is upset to see Paula with Vicente and makes a scene. Leopoldo complains to Inés about her new relationship. Marco takes revenge on Alberto and beats him up.
32	"De mí no se van a burlar"	19 October 2021	2.1
Alberto is beaten by Marco and Marco complains to him for helping Paula. Sofía arrives to help Alberto. Titi is furious to see that Alberto doesn't make it to the ultrasound. Vicente looks for Laura to explain Paula's situation. Nicolás helps Romina with her doubts about the tests. Leonor rejects Daniel once again and he agrees to go out with Ceci. Titi goes to Alberto's house so that together they can reveal the sex of the baby. Diego discovers that Leopoldo is Inés' lover. Sofía receives a patient who puts her in danger because of Titi.
33	"Revoloteo de mariposas"	20 October 2021	2.4
Sofía receives a patient who puts her in danger because of Titi. Laura argues again with Vicente because of Paula's presence. Sofía goes to the newspaper and discovers that Titi was the one who placed the erotic ad. Martha continues to treat Fede badly. Sofía confronts Titi for placing the ad in the newspaper. Romina wins a painting contest and kisses Nicolás.
34	"Mamá, ven por mí"	21 October 2021	2.6
Laura and Paula confront each other during Romina's party. Fede continues to be mistreated by his aunt Martha. Romina and Nicolás become a couple. Fede suffers at Martha's house and talks to Sofía to come get him. Diego kisses Inés and assures her that he has found his soul mate. Sofía thanks Alberto for his support. Diego ill-advises Inés to ask Leopoldo for a trust fund for Ana. Laura explodes with jealousy when she sees Vicente with Paula.
35	"Al toro por los cuernos"	22 October 2021	2.5
Laura decides to break up with Vicente. Sofía makes it clear to Diego that he will not be able to see Fede until they see a judge. Leopoldo asks Alberto for advice and ends up deciding to tell Sofía everything. Mónica decides not to show up for her proposal and receives Orlando's support. Leopoldo regrets telling Sofía the truth. Laura decides to return to her town. Orlando takes advantage of Mónica's vulnerability. Leopoldo discovers that Diego is Inés' new boyfriend and confronts him. Sofía discovers her father and Alberto together outside Ana's house.
36	"Sacar tajada"	25 October 2021	2.3
Sofía is surprised to see Alberto and her father outside Anita's house. Inés claims that Ana just wants to get her attention, but Sofía warns her about what Anita wants to do. Diego blackmails Leopoldo. Titi commits an indiscretion. Pedro sees Mónica hugging Chucho and confronts them, she finally reveals the reason why she left him. Sofía suspects that something is going on with her father when he agrees to let her see Fede without his consent. Diego manages to seduce Inés and they make love. Anita tells Sofía that her mother did not come home.
37	"Así es la vida"	26 October 2021	2.3
When Vicente learns that Marco has been arrested, he informs Paula to go home and Paula says goodbye to all the Muñoz Cano family, thanking them for their great support. Anita is indifferent to Diego. Alberto apologizes to his family for the problems they are having on the property. Mónica asks Orlando not to look for her again. Romina comes to visit Nicolás' house; he shows her his bedroom and she misunderstands things. Leopoldo gets Alberto in trouble with Sofía, who thinks her father is losing his memory.
38	"¡Hora de independizarse!"	27 October 2021	2.6
Leopoldo reveals to Inés that Diego is Sofía's ex-husband and prevents Diego from telling Elsa everything. Leonor tells Romina that she has already found an apartment to live alone. Alberto complains to Leopoldo for getting him in trouble with Sofía. Leopoldo lies to Sofía again. Inés complains to Diego for hiding his identity from her. Sofía and Alberto reconcile. Leopoldo asks Alberto to stay away from Sofía and Fede because of Diego's threats.
39	"La edad no es un obstáculo"	28 October 2021	2.4
Sofía accompanies Leopoldo to the neurologist and learns that Fede suffered an accident at school while playing soccer with Felipe. Sofía worries about her father's memory. Alberto refuses to see Sofía and Fede on Leopoldo's instructions, but Sofía complains to him for his indifference and rejection. Nicolás and Romina enjoy an evening at the bowling alley, but Romina is embarrassed to see her mother with Daniel. Leopoldo is in trouble as Ana arrives at the dealership.
40	"¡Mi abuela se sacó la lotería!"	29 October 2021	2.2
Adrián jeopardizes Leopoldo's double life by taking Anita to work, for which he ends up firing him. However, Anita complains to him and makes Leopoldo rectify his decision. Inés' ex flirts with Elsa. Elsa puts a stop to Inés' ex. Elsa clears things up with Inés about her ex. Diego blackmails Leopoldo. Titi tells Raul that the baby she is expecting may be his. Diego takes money from Inés, in addition to deceiving her. Alberto and Sofía talk about marriage thanks to Fede. Alberto's family wins the lottery.
41	"Dar para recibir"	1 November 2021	2.2
The whole Muñoz Cano family is happy to learn that Delia won the lottery. Diego is upset to learn that he will have to buy tennis shoes for Fede. Mónica is afraid of being alone. Delia and Alberto decide to use the money to pay the debt and to help those who work in the workshop. Diego tries to blackmail Alberto, but Alberto stops him by telling him to take care of his son.
42	"No te va a querer"	2 November 2021	2.4
Eugenia unburdens herself to Omar after discovering that Alicia her daughter is dead, Omar pretends to feel pain. Anita makes it clear to Leopoldo that she is dating Adrián. Diego tells Fede that Alberto will despise him when he marries Sofía. Omar wants to stop the investigation of Alicia's death. Chucho prepares for his date with Mónica. Nicolás is taken to the Torito. Fede does not want to see Alberto and is rude to him. Mónica breaks Chucho's heart when she stands him up and discovers that she preferred to date someone else.
43	"Una lección de vida"	3 November 2021	2.4
Raúl receives help from a stranger when he chokes in a restaurant. Chucho complains to Raúl for not giving him Mónica's message and hits him. Eugenia is sad about Alicia's death. Romina and Delia witness Nicolás being hit by his aunt Georgina. Fabiana is dazzled by Vicente. Alberto finds out about Mónica's date with Orlando. Alberto tries to surprise Fede but discovers that he left with Diego. Leopoldo gives Alberto a few beers but they both drink too much and Diego is upset to see him in that state. Omar kisses Sofía.
44	"La segunda noche que pasamos juntos"	4 November 2021	2.9
Omar steals a kiss from Sofía and Alberto sees them. Diego continues to blackmail Leopoldo and Leopoldo agrees to continue paying him for his silence. Leonor becomes jealous of Cecilia. Elsa tells Leopoldo and Sofía that Diego is Ines' boyfriend. Daniel invites Cecilia to a concert. Fabiana agrees to have dinner with Chucho, but discovers that their signs are not compatible. Titi and Alberto are mugged and must spend the night tied up. Inés asks Leopoldo to come back. Cecilia kisses Daniel.
45	"Hasta aquí la dejamos"	5 November 2021	2.6
Diego sees Alberto and Titi in a restaurant and takes pictures of them. Sofía learns that Alberto spent the night with Titi. Alberto ends his partnership with Leopoldo and Orlando. Inés sees Diego very affectionate with another woman and confronts him for using her. Sofía does not understand Alberto's attitude when he spends the night with Titi. Romina is still worried about Nicolás. Romina has a crisis. Sofía complains to Alberto for spending the night with Titi, but he is still angry after seeing her kissing Omar. Georgina tries to seduce Nicolás. Diego reveals the truth.
46	"¡Te robaste al frijol!"	8 November 2021	2.7
Leopoldo hires some men to prevent Diego from revealing his infidelity and gets a big shock when he is kidnapped. Georgina tries to seduce Nicolás but he rejects her again. Fabiana continues flirting with Vicente. Mónica congratulates Chucho for dating Fabiana. Nicolás' uncle beats him and kicks him out from home when he learns that he wanted to make a pass at his wife. Alberto is furious when he learns that Sofía is going on a trip with Omar.
47	"Omar está de por medio"	9 November 2021	2.8
Nico finds a vacancy as a waiter and applies to continue his studies. Inés and Luis attend dinner at Elsa's house and both continue with the lie of being married and Leopoldo gets uncomfortable with Luis. Eugenia wants to leave her inheritance to Omar. Diego continues to have nightmares. Chucho and Fabiana make a plan for Alberto and Sofía to get together and settle their differences.
48	"El amor se acabó"	10 November 2021	2.7
Sofía and Alberto are unable to reconcile and both think their relationship is lost. Diego continues with the cleanse to get rid of his fear after his kidnapping. Nicolás fails as a waiter. Sofía unburdens herself with Elsa after her breakup with Alberto. Fede doesn't want his mom to stay with Omar. Mónica falls into Orlando's hands. Fede talks to Alberto. Ines faints. Daniel is sure he loves Leonor. Omar takes advantage of his trip to the congress to try to get closer to Sofía.
49	"Desviando fondos"	11 November 2021	2.5
Leopoldo leaves immediately to help Anita. The doctor informs Inés that she must undergo several tests, as she could be pregnant. Diego looks for Fede to tell him that he will have to leave for a few days and Fede is furious to learn that he will be leaving him again. Alberto is distracted from his breakup. Fabiana reveals to Eugenia that she doubts Omar's honesty. Vicente meets María, a new friend. Omar makes a proposal to Sofía.
50	"Me voy de aquí"	12 November 2021	2.5
The Muñoz-Cano disapprove of Mónica's relationship with Orlando and she decides to leave the house. Omar is happy to know that Sofía will give him a chance. Fabiana does everything to get Sofía back with Alberto, but Sofía gets upset. Mónica gets upset when Chucho complains about her leaving with Orlando. Inés gets her studies done. Fede prevents Sofía from going out with Omar, who begins to be investigated by Eugenia. Vicente meets with María in a park.
51	"No puedo vivir sin él"	15 November 2021	2.7
Alberto provokes Sofía's jealousy. Inés learns that she must have surgery to remove the cancer. Vicente arrives for his date with María. Eugenia makes it clear to Omar that she will return to the foundation. Alberto and Sofía begin to rebuild their lives, but Romina enters a crisis when she discovers that Nicolás went out with Rebeca, this causes Sofía and Alberto to unite again.
52	"Sofía visita a Inés"	16 November 2021	2.7
Sofía manages to reassure Romina after the crisis she suffered and recommends Leonor to take her to a psychiatrist. Omar and Sofía kiss. Verónica must pay for a meal for Alberto. Orlando offends Mónica and she slaps him so he ends up kicking her out of his apartment. Inés arrives at the hospital for surgery. Sofía runs into her father at the hospital where Inés is hospitalized; he fears that he could be discovered. Nicolás discovers that Romina has had a crisis.
53	"¡No me digas así!"	17 November 2021	2.9
Romina receives Nicolás' letter, arrives at her date with him and they end up reconciling. Leopoldo manages to get out of his lie without problems. María leaves her house to meet Vicente but gets lost. Leopoldo takes Fede to Alberto so that he can go to the hospital with Inés. Bárbara insults Romina, who ends up throwing a rock at her. Vicente finds a way to communicate with María.
54	"Intento de homicidio"	18 November 2021	2.6
Romina is arrested for attempted murder after injuring Bárbara with a stone. Leonor and Alberto do everything they can to get Romina released. Nicolás learns that Bárbara is seriously ill in the hospital and visits her, but her father makes him leave and makes it clear that he wants justice. Sofía and Gotcha help Romina to be sentenced to house arrest while the judge determines her sentence, but Romina asks Nico to take her to see Bárbara at the hospital.
55	"¡Hasta aquí llegamos!"	19 November 2021	2.6
Bárbara's father rejects Leonor's apology and assures her that he will put Romina in an asylum. María decides to confide in Vicente. Elsa rejects Leopoldo. Diego loses control at the spiritual retreat and decides to leave. Diego returns, out of fear, to the retreat. Daniel tries to return to Leonor. Elsa asks Leopoldo for a divorce.
56	"Personas con el corazón duro"	22 November 2021	2.9
Bárbara's father threatens to put Romina in the asylum. Omar's shady business dealings come to light. Vicente tries to help María, but neither Zulma nor her mother will allow him. Alberto discovers Raúl speaking ill of Romina and fires him from the workshop. Leopoldo receives a call from Elsa at Inés' house. Raúl learns that Leopoldo has another daughter besides Sofía, he will take advantage of this to try to get his job back.
57	"Un amor prohibido"	23 November 2021	3.1
Leopoldo's double life is taking its toll on him, as he is realizing what he lost when he let Elsa go. The social worker seems to be in love with Alberto, which makes her jealous of Leonor as she suspects the two of them of having a relationship.
58	"En estado de shock"	24 November 2021	2.7
A misunderstanding due to the jealousy of the social worker will complicate the situation between Alberto and Sofía. Bárbara's situation does not improve, so her father will take the most severe actions so that Romina is not free.
59	"Tenemos que ser fuertes"	25 November 2021	2.9
Leopoldo arrives unexpectedly at the house, but Elsa will not allow him to stay. Romina is sent to an asylum. Inés will not allow Leopoldo to see her face. Alberto is devastated by Sofía's confession.
60	"No puedo vivir sin ti"	26 November 2021	2.6
Ana learns that her team will not be able to participate in the mini-Olympics and asks the school authorities for an explanation. Ana disobeys the principal's orders and gets a suspension. The doctor who is treating Bárbara discovers that she has a hematoma, and upon questioning her, he concludes that the birth control pills she is taking caused the damage. The judge determines that Romina is innocent. Elsa gives Leopoldo another chance.
61	"Los días sin ti fueron eternos"	29 November 2021	2.9
Gotcha informs all the Muñoz Cano family that Romina will be released from the asylum. Inés scolds Ana for being expelled from school. Fabiana kisses Chucho. All the Muñoz-Cano family receive Romina with love after her release from the clinic. Delia invites Sofía to Romina's welcome party and runs into Verónica. Omar suffers severe pain.
62	"El destino se empeña en juntarnos"	30 November 2021	2.8
Sofía is worried when she sees Omar in bad shape and with Alberto's help he is taken to the hospital. Verónica is uncomfortable when she learns of Titi's pregnancy, due to Sofía’s indiscretion. Romina is cleared of all charges. Alberto and Sofía end up having dinner alone and he confesses his love for her.
63	"No le importo a nadie"	1 December 2021	2.9
Sofía rejects Alberto, as she does not want to leave Omar. Romina poses for a photo shoot and proves she has great modeling skills. Inés demands Leopoldo that Luis retracts his decision to change Anita's school. Romina manages to keep the modeling job. Leonor suffers when she sees that no one remembered her birthday.
64	"¡Ya va a nacer el bebé!"	2 December 2021	2.9
The Muñoz Cano family prepare everything and give Leonor a surprise party. Mónica finds out that Chucho is with Fabiana. Leonor breaks up with Daniel. Titi suffers strong contractions, Sofía and Fabiana take her to the hospital. Vicente and María almost kiss. Inés learns of Elsa's trip.
65	"¡Ya nació el bebé de Titi!"	3 December 2021	3.1
Inés complains to Leopoldo about his trip to Europe and demands that he also take her. Titi has to have a C-section and gets upset with Alberto. María feels bad about being rejected by Vicente. Diego blackmails Leopoldo. Zulma discovers Vicente and Salomón's lie. Everyone waits to meet Titi’s baby, but when they see him, they are shocked by his resemblance to the real father.
66	"Caprichoso es el amor"	6 December 2021	2.7
Miguel is furious at Titi for lying to him. Sofía and Alberto meet to talk about what Titi did, but end up kissing and making love. María escapes from Zulma and manages to get to Alberto's house. Sofía doesn’t know how to break up with Omar.
67	"Agradezco haberte conocido"	7 December 2021	2.9
Sofía tries to break up with Omar during dinner but he takes out his finished book and she decides not to say anything to him. Octavio demands that María return to the house, but Vicente defends her. Octavio fires Zulma. Sofía sees how insensitive Omar is and breaks up with him. Romina manages to make her first commercial. Vicente supports María in finding her grandfather.
68	"Tengo los días contados"	8 December 2021	3.1
Leopoldo and Elsa go on a trip to Europe. Diego tells Sofía that he has a terminal illness and she invites him to live in her house. Vicente takes María to her grandfather. Inés suffers because of Leopoldo's trip. Octavio orders Vicente to be beaten. Alberto is surprised to learn that Diego will live with Fede and Sofía.
69	"Te voy a extrañar"	9 December 2021	2.8
Alberto is surprised to learn that Diego will live with Sofía and Fede because of the terrible disease he is suffering from. Mónica argues with Alberto for meddling in her life. María thanks Vicente for his help and they say goodbye with a romantic kiss. Leonor discovers Romina's secret and Mónica discovers Adam's secret.
70	"¿Te casarías conmigo?"	10 December 2021	3.0
Adán manages to hide from Mónica that he is still married. Daniel tries to start a relationship with Cecilia. Fabiana catches Chucho with Mónica because of Raúl’s message. María has an operation. Chucho confronts Raúl. Alberto prepares a big surprise to propose to Sofía with Fede's help. Monica discovers that Adán is still with his wife.
71	"Ni loco te voy a dar el divorcio"	13 December 2021	2.7
Sofía agrees to marry Alberto. Mónica confronts Adán in front of his wife for cheating on both of them. Elsa and Leopoldo are happy with Alberto's marriage proposal. Diego does not want to give Sofía a divorce, since he does not want Alberto to be Fede's stepfather. Omar confronts Sofía because of her engagement to Alberto. Alberto looks for Diego but things get out of control.
72	"Una vil estafadora"	14 December 2021	2.9
Diego insists on not giving Sofía a divorce. A woman gets Alberto in trouble after accusing him of stealing her purse. Diego has a plan in mind to stop Sofía from getting married. Omar with Orlando's help hires a man to accuse Sofía of plagiarism. Delia gets a job doing commercials. Diego threatens Sofía with taking Fede away from her if she insists on a divorce.
73	"El amor no tiene edad"	15 December 2021	2.7
Diego threatens Sofía with taking Fede away from her if she goes through with the divorce, but Gotcha promises to help her get a divorce. Vicente fears that María will leave him when she regains her sight, so he asks her to forget him. Anita discovers that her father has another daughter. Inés complains to Leopoldo about his trip. Vicente accepts that he loves María and looks for her.
74	"¡Por los futuros esposos!"	16 December 2021	2.9
Sofía and Alberto have in mind to look for a place to live and Anita helps them view the apartment that is for rent in her building. The Muñoz-Cano's get together to celebrate Alberto and Sofía's engagement. Leopoldo is shocked to learn that Sofía wants to live in the same building as Ana and Inés.
75	"Eres tal como te imaginaba"	17 December 2021	2.9
Leopoldo plans to unite Diego with Mima Palacios. Sofía gets upset with Alberto for his lousy attitude in choosing the apartment. Alberto asks Gotcha for help and they both end up making Sofía angry. Romina gets jealous because of Bárbara. María comes out well from surgery and sees Vicente for the first time.
76	"Te espera una nueva vida"	20 December 2021	3.0
María is happy to see again. Leopoldo wants Anita and Inés to go live far away. Cecilia kisses Dani in front of Leonor out of jealousy. Anita asks Sofía for help. Fede fights at school. Cecilia decides to break up with Dani. Leopoldo enters a crisis and pretends that Clara, his supposed wife, suffered a heart attack, after this news Inés says that Clara died.
77	"Las mentiras tienen las patas muy cortas"	21 December 2021	2.7
Leopoldo manages to trick Anita with Gocha's help. Fede apologizes to his classmate for hitting him. Vicente is disappointed in María, as he makes it clear that now that she can see she is no longer interested in him and doesn't need him either. Diego wants to take Fede on a trip, but Sofía does not like the idea.
78	"Haríamos buena pareja"	22 December 2021	N/A
Alberto talks to Vicente after rejecting María. Vicente has a dream with Leonor and begins to behave very affectionate with her. Diego tells Sofía that he is cured. Elsa, Sofía and Leopoldo meet Diego's girlfriend Mima. Diego reveals Leopoldo's secret to Mima. Anita invites Sofía to her Quinceañera party. Mima plans to open Elsa's eyes about Leopoldo.
79	"De tripas corazón"	23 December 2021	N/A
Mima tries to tell Elsa the truth. María invites Vicente to Barcelona. Sofía and Alberto celebrate Diego's acceptance of the divorce and Alberto questions Sofía about the possibility of having another child. Sebastián humiliates Mónica when he learns that she loves Bernardo, but Alberto comes to her defense. Elsa finally discovers that Leopoldo has another family and that Anita is his daughter.
80	"El peor día de mi vida"	24 December 2021	N/A
Elsa suffers after discovering Leopoldo's infidelity, but pretends not to know anything. Vicente and María end their relationship. Alberto is reunited with Andrea, an ex-girlfriend. Elsa buys rat poison to take revenge on Leopoldo. Leopoldo wants to prevent Sofía from going to Anita's quinceañera party.
81	"Mi vida es una mentira"	27 December 2021	2.6
Leopoldo continues with his plans to prevent Elsa from attending Anita's party, but she takes it upon herself to bring him a surprise to Inés' house. Fede's absence in the house causes Sofía to cancel her attendance to Anita's party and this ruins Elsa's plans.
82	"Todo pasa por algo"	28 December 2021	3.0
Sofía explodes against Diego for not fulfilling the deal to take Fede at the right time and this prevents her from going to Ana's party. Leopoldo manages to enjoy Ana's party without any pressure. Elsa is fed up with Leopoldo's lies and seeks Gonzalo's help to divorce him, even though it means leaving her husband with nothing.
83	"Álbum de fotos"	29 December 2021	2.9
Anita wants Sofía to know in detail what happened at her birthday party and wants to show her her photo album. Leopoldo's secret is in danger, but he will do everything to hide it. Sofía is fed up with Fede's attitude after living with his father and Mima, but everything reaches its worst point because Diego forgot to pick up Fede at school.
84	"Me quiero divorciar de tu padre"	30 December 2021	N/A
Elsa confirms with Gonzalo that she is ready to file for divorce from Leopoldo and decides to confess to her daughter. Gotcha finally reveals to his brother that he is gay. While Leopoldo enjoys a vacation with Anita, Elsa explains to the employees of the dealership that she is the new general manager.
85	"La verdad sobre Leopoldo"	31 December 2021	2.1
Sofía doesn’t understand her son's attitude. Elsa meets with Inés and the latter tells her about her relationship with Leopoldo. Elsa cries over her decision to separate from Leopoldo and when he returns from her trip she confronts him to file for divorce.
86	"Perdí a quien más quería"	3 January 2022	N/A
Elsa asks for Leopoldo for a divorce because of his infidelity, and kicks him out of the house and the dealership. Romina is attacked in a phone call by the producer of the commercial. Inés unburdens herself to her mother. Alberto hears at the funeral that Cosme was not Erika's father, so he questions Andrea.
87	"Tengo una hija"	4 January 2022	N/A
Alberto is shocked to learn that Erika is his daughter. Fede suffers when he learns that his grandparents are getting divorced like his parents. The Muñoz Cano family is happy to see Romina's second commercial. Vicente offends Leonor for Romina's work and she slaps him, but he steals a kiss. Alberto tells Sofía about Erika and she does not react well to the news. Anita wants to return home.
88	"Por tu culpa se perdió"	5 January 2022	3.0
Sofía apologizes to Alberto. Fede is happy to see his grandfather, but Leopoldo in an oversight causes Timoteo to get lost. Andrea asks Alberto for help to get a job. Fede suffers when he realizes that Timoteo is lost and blames his grandfather for not taking care of him. Leonor kisses Vicente. Ana and Inés decide to return to Mexico City, but on the way they have an accident.
89	"Dile que la quiero con toda el alma"	6 January 2022	N/A
Alberto manages to find Timoteo. Inés and Anita have an accident on the road, Leopoldo arrives to support them but Inés begins to feel ill and asks Leopoldo to take care of Anita. Inés undergoes emergency surgery for a hemorrhage, but during the operation she suffers a heart attack and dies. Leopoldo suffers when he gives the news to Anita.
90	"Ese es mi papá"	7 January 2022	3.4
Leopoldo informs Anita that her mother is dead. Anita is devastated and thinks she is alone, but Leopoldo promises to be by her side. Sofía learns of Anita's terrible moment and goes to the funeral home to support her. Leopoldo is surprised to see Sofía at Inés' funeral and is confronted by his daughters.
91	"Engañada por partida doble"	10 January 2022	3.1
Sofía discovers Leopoldo and Alberto's betrayal and decides to end their engagement. Anita finds out about her father's lies and decides to run away from Leopoldo. Sofía unburdens herself to her mother. Anita steals from a store out of necessity and is arrested. Sofia comes to Anita's aid. Elsa allows Anita to stay at her house and receives her with much love.
92	"Me quedé vacío"	11 January 2022	3.3
Sofía wants to make up for lost time with Anita and decides to get her things so she can live with her. Eugenia is ready to catch Omar. Fede is happy to learn that Anita is his aunt. Mima and Diego will fight for Fede. Leopoldo tries to explain to Sofía what happened. At the hospital, Eugenia confronts Omar about his crimes, he accepts them and confesses to having killed her daughter Alicia.
93	"¿Quieres un anillo?"	12 January 2022	3.6
Omar kills Eugenia. Sofía consoles Omar. Vicente gives Leonor an engagement ring, as he wants to spend the rest of his life by her side. Vicente and Leonor make love and confess their relationship. Diego is upset to learn of Mima's prenuptial contract. Erika hears Vicente say that Alberto is her father and confronts him.
94	"Nunca serás mi papá"	13 January 2022	3.4
Salomón is impressed by Cecilia's beauty. Erika does not accept Alberto as her father and runs away from home. Salomón declares his love for Ceci and they kiss. Alberto looks for Sofía to clarify what happened with Leopoldo. Erika leaves for Querétaro. Omar and Sofía attend the reading of Eugenia's will.
95	"Él no te hizo nada"	14 January 2022	3.1
Omar is furious to learn that Sofía is the heir to his mother-in-law's fortune, so he will try to kill her to prevent her from getting away with it. Alberto learns of Erika's whereabouts and lets her mother know. Fabiana warns Sofía about Omar. Dani is caught in a mix-up by criminals who kidnap him away from the city. Mario Trejo, Eugenia's private investigator, lets Sofía know about Omar's shady dealings. Leopoldo engages in small talk with Elsa and Sofía.
96	"De tripas corazón"	16 January 2022	3.3
97	"Te voy a amar toda la vida"	16 January 2022	3.3
Sofía will do everything to make Omar pay for his crimes. Nicolás makes a promise to Romina and says goodbye to everyone to go study in Boston. Mima wants to put Diego in jail. Sofía asks Omar to help her with the foundation. Fabiana hands over everything for the audit. Diego wants to buy the hotel in Huatulco. Leopoldo explains everything to Sofía. Fede follows Alberto's plan, they manage to get Sofía alone with Alberto. Alberto asks Sofía to marry him again, she forgives him and they end up reconciling. Mónica resigns from her job to dedicate herself to her home. Elsa asks Leopoldo to return to the dealership, they decide to have a good relationship for Anita. Diego is the victim of a swindle when he buys a hotel in ruins. Time goes by, Sofía and Alberto arrange everything for their wedding. Vicente organizes a bachelor party for Alberto. Sofía and Alberto arrive at the altar to unite their lives. Omar ends up in jail for his theft from the foundation. Diego and his aunt sell quesadillas to survive. Fede and Alberto are happy that Sofía will have triplets.
