= Aitor Iturrioz =

Mexican actor (born 1970)

- Born: Aitor Antonio Iturrioz Ortiz; 9 April 1970 (age 54); Mexico City, Mexico
- Occupation: Actor

Aitor Antonio Iturrioz Ortiz (born 9 April 1970) is a Mexican actor. He is best known for his roles in telenovelas Clase 406 as Max Brouer, Rebelde as Esteban Nolasco, and Al diablo con los guapos as the antagonist Mateo.

Iturrioz is of Basque descent.

== Career ==
Aitor Iturrioz began his television career as the program presenter for Don Francisco Presenta. Later on he acted in several television soap operas such as Retrato de Familia (1995) and Luz Clarita (1996).

In 2004, he was cast in the first season of the telenovela Rebelde, playing the role of Esteban Nolasco, but was replaced the next year by Tony Dalton. In 2006, he appeared in the series La fea más bella, a remake of the Colombian telenovela Yo soy Betty, la fea. The following year he starred in the production Lola: Once Upon a Time.

== Filmography ==
Year	Title	Role
1995	Retrato de Familia	Octavio
1996	Luz Clarita	Jose Mariano
1998	Mi pequeña traviesa	Hugo
1999	Por tu amor	Agustín Higueras Ledesma
2000	DKDA: Sueños de juventud	Aitor
2001	Primer amor... a mil por hora	Boris
2003	Tu Historia de amor	Marcos
2003	Velo de Novia	Marcos
2003	Clase 406	Max Brouer
2004	Don Francisco Presenta	Aitor
2004–2005	Rebelde	Esteban Nolasco Landeros
2005	La Fea más bella (13 Episodes)	Rafael
2006	Lola Érase una vez (1 Episode)	Richard
2007	Al Diablo con los Guapos	Mateo
2013	Como dice el dicho	Kai
