= Tatuada en tus besos =

Tatuada En Tus Besos

Studio album by Irán Castillo
- Released: June 15, 1999
- Recorded: (Mexico City, Mexico) and (Spain)
- Genre: Pop
- Length: 53:38
- Label: Sony Music
- Producers: Mario Figueroa, Eduardo Posada, Pablo Pinilla.

Irán Castillo chronology
Tiempos Nuevos (1997)	Tatuada En Tus Besos (1999)	TBA (2008)

Tatuada En Tus Besos is the second album by Mexican femme singer-songwriter Irán Castillo, released by Sony Music Mexico in the United States and Mexico on June 15, 1999 (see 1999 in music). It includes the singles "Por Ti, Por Mí", "Sola" from the soap opera Soñadoras, "Di Que No", and "No Vendrá".

The American edition of this album, includes the bonus track of "Girando En El Tiempo", theme of the soap opera Preciosa.

== Track listing ==
1. "Por Ti, Por Mí" (Difelisatti, Miguel Luna) – 3:24
2. "Vuélveme A Tocar" (M. Cazaubon) – 4:11
3. "Ámame Ahora Y Siempre" (David Santisteban) – 4:05
4. "Nada Más Que Hablar" (E.Posada, S. Pérez, F.Bustos) – 3:49
5. "Y Pienso En Ti" (Difelissati, Miguel Luna) – 4:24
6. "Tatuada En Tus Besos" (M. Carbari, Irán Castillo) – 3:47
7. "Toda Para Ti" (Eduardo Posada, S. Pérez, M. Pérez, F. Bustos) – 3:37
8. "Sola" (M. Carbari, M. Cazaubon) – 4:08
9. "Di Que No" (Difelisatti, Miguel Luna) – 4:24
10. "Tus Puntos Dormidos" (Irán Castillo) – 3:28
11. "Amor Incondicional" (Difelisatti, Miguel Luna) – 3:08
12. "Libre Mariposa" (E.Posada, D.Posada, Sergio Pérez, F.Bustos) – 4:17
13. "No Vendrá" (Difelisatti, Miguel Luna) – 3:51
14. "Sabor De Tu Boca" (E.Posada, S. Pérez, F.Bustos) – 3:05

USA bonus tracks

- 1. "Girando En El Tiempo" (L.América, M. Francisco Navarrete) - 3:43
