= Morelia (TV series) =

- Genre: Telenovela; Romance; Drama
- Created by: Delia Fiallo
- Written by: Ximena Suárez
- Directed by: Grazio D'Angelo; Andrei Zinca
- Starring: Alpha Acosta; Arturo Peniche; Cecilia Bolocco; Marcela Cardona; Lupita Ferrer; Jorge Salinas; Salvador Pineda; Sergio Basañez
- Theme music composer: Jorge Avendaño Lührs
- Opening theme: "Morelia" by Cristian Castro
- Country of origin: Mexico
- Original language: Spanish
- No. of episodes: 235

Production
- Executive producers: José Enrique Crousillat; Malú Crousillat
- Production locations: Miami, Florida, United States
- Running time: 42-45 minutes
- Production company: Televisa

Original release
- Network: Canal de las Estrellas; Univisión
- Release: May 29, 1995 – April 19, 1996

Related
- La zulianita (1977); María de nadie (1986); Maribel (1989); Un refugio para el amor (2012)

Morelia is a Mexican telenovela produced by José Enrique Crousillat and Malú Crousillat for Televisa in 1995. Alpha Acosta and Arturo Peniche starred as protagonists, while Cecilia Bolocco starred as the main antagonist.

== Plot ==
The story begins when the man who Morelia thinks is her father dies without revealing the secret of her true origin. A landowner in her hometown, Michoacán, harasses her and she is forced to run away. She arrives in Miami, where she has no choice but to work in a nightclub. During her first day at work, an insolent customer, Le Blanc goes too far with her. Morelia slaps him, and he accuses her of stealing his wallet after that.

Thanks to Carlos Montero, a lazy lawyer, she avoids going to jail, however she loses her job. Thus, Morelia begins to work as a maid at the Campos Miranda's residence, where she meets the oldest son, Jose Enrique. They fall in love, but their romance will be opposed by many.

== Cast ==
- Alpha Acosta as Morelia Solórzano Ríos/Morelia Montero Iturbide/Amanda Weiss
- Arturo Peniche as José Enrique Campos Miranda
- Cecilia Bolocco as Karina Lafontaine Smith de Montero
- Lupita Ferrer as Ofelia Campos Miranda de Santibáñez
- Jorge Salinas as Alberto "Beto" Solórzano Ríos
- Salvador Pineda as Federico Campos Miranda
- Sergio Basañez as Luis Campos Miranda
- Herminia Martínez as Antonia Iturbide Pimentel Vda. de Campos Miranda
- Norma Zúñiga as Mercedes
- Raquel Montero as Luisiana Smith Vda. de Lafontaine
- Javier Alberdi as Gustavo Santibáñez
- Odalys García as Reina
- Ana Margo as Kika
- Ana Bertha Espín as Magdalena Ríos Vda. de Solórzano
- Ramón Abascal as Germán Doré
- Manuel Guízar as Avelino Robles
- Patricia Noguera as Dania
- Rene Lavan as Rony
- Mario Martín as Benjamín Le Blanc
- Marcela Cardona "Scarlata" as Jacqueline "Jackie" Campos Miranda Iturbide de Solórzano
- Marisela González "Kanela" as Juanita
- Humberto Rosenfeld as Tomy
- Adriana Catano as "Esmeralda"
- Eugenio Cobo as Arturo Solórzano
- Juan Pablo Gamboa as Osvaldo Valenzuela
- Mara Croatto as Sarah
- Giselle Blondet as Liza Marsella
- Daniel Alvarado as Lorenzo Campos Miranda
- Fernando Carrera as Bosco Sartini
- Raúl Durán as Efraín
- Araceli Martínez as Mireya
- Maritza Morgado as Lizette
- Jorge Bustamante as Landa
- Teresa Mayan as Carmita
- Julio Martínez as Barbarito
- Manolo Pérez Morales as Carlos
- Nuri Flores as Lala
- Liliana Rodríguez as Lulu
- Armando Roblan as Calvo
- Marta Velasco as Omara
- Andy Mendez as Pillete
- Yovana de la Cruz

== Awards ==
Year	Award	Category	Nominee	Result
1996	14th TVyNovelas Awards	Launching Female	Alpha Acosta	Nominated
