= Sentimientos Ajenos =

Mexican telenovela

- Genre: Telenovela; Romance; Drama
- Created by: Arturo Moya Grau
- Written by: Lorena Salazar; Eduardo Quiroga; Luz Orlín
- Directed by: Aurora Molina; José Acosta Navas
- Starring: Yolanda Andrade; Carlos Ponce; Chantal Andere; Olivia Bucio; Arsenio Campos; Mario Cimarro; Lourdes Deschamps; Isaura Espinoza; Ernesto Godoy
- Opening theme: Sentimientos ajenos by David Torrens
- Ending theme: No puedo vivir by Carlos Ponce
- Country of origin: Mexico
- Original language: Spanish
- No. of episodes: 60

Production
- Executive producer: José Alberto Castro
- Producer: Ernesto Hernández
- Production locations: Filming; Televisa San Ángel; Mexico City, Mexico
- Cinematography: Fernando Chacón; Isabel Basurto
- Running time: 41-44 minutes (episodes 1-20); 21-22 minutes (episodes 21-100)
- Production company: Televisa

Original release
- Network: Canal de las Estrellas
- Release: August 19, 1996 – January 3, 1997

Related
- Un ángel en el fango (1967)

Sentimientos Ajenos (English: Feelings of Others) is a Mexican telenovela produced by José Alberto Castro for Televisa. It aired on Canal de las Estrellas from Monday August 19, 1996 to Friday January 3, 1997, and it is based on radionovela Dos mujeres y un hombre, written by Arturo Moya Grau.

Yolanda Andrade and Carlos Ponce starred as protagonists, while Chantal Andere starred as main antagonist.

== Plot ==
Sentimientos Ajenos is the story of Sofía, a sweet young painter who falls in love with Renato with no idea that her love would release a tide of hatred from her own sister. Leonor will let nothing keep her from her goal of preventing their marriage and failing that, she tries a million ways to steal her sister's husband, something which sends their father to his grave. Up to her tricks, Leonor seduces an impetuous and passionate young man while masquerading as Sofia. When Renato discovers the supposed affair between his wife and Humberto, he bitterly throws her from the house. Confused and hurt, Sofia must fight to recover her life from the grasp of an enemy whom she would never expect.

== Cast ==
- Yolanda Andrade as Sofía
- Carlos Ponce as Renato Aramendia
- Chantal Andere as Leonor de la Huerta Herrera - sister of Sofía
- Olivia Bucio as Eva Barrientos - godmother of Renato and mother of Gerardo
- Arsenio Campos as Joaquín - in love with Leonor
- Ernesto Godoy as Gerardo Barrientos - Cousin of Renato
- Mario Cimarro as Ramiro - friend of Dario
- Lourdes Deschamps as Raquel - in love with Ramiro
- Isaura Espinoza as Aurora Mendiola - mother of Dario
- Carmelita González as Inés - housekeeper at Sofía's house
- Susana González as Norma - best friend of Sofía
- Aarón Hernán as Andrés Barrientos - godfather of Renato and father of Gerardo
- Gloria Izaguirre as Lucha - housekeeper at Barrientos house
- Manuel Landeta as Miguel Ángel - in love with Sofía
- Ana Bertha Lepe as Teresa - owner of guesthouse
- Adalberto Martínez as Pedro - gardener at Barrientos house
- Orlando Miguel as Darío Mendiola - lover of Leonor
- Marcela Matos as Malena - girlfriend of Gerardo
- Edith Márquez as Marcela - sister of Humberto
- Javier Ortiz as Humberto - in love with Leonor
- Katia del Río as Delia - girlfriend of Ramiro
- Héctor Sáez as Fernando - father of Malena
- Edi Xol as Felipe Bonilla - lawyer
- Gabriela Arroyo as Judith - therapist of Marcela, in love with Humberto
- José Elías Moreno as José María de la Huerta - father of Sofía and Leonor
- Antonio Miguel as Father Efraín
- Dina de Marco as Donata
- Dolores Beristáin as Graciana
- José Viller as Ernesto
- Marisol del Olmo as Lupita
- Eduardo Lugo as Don Jesús
- Alejandra Jurado as Amalia
- Gustavo Negrete
- Enrike Palma
- Héctor Rubio
- Tomás Leal
- Sergio Márquez
- Fernanda Franco
- Manuel Cepeda
- José Luis Llamas
- Susana Contreras
- Rubén Gondray

== Awards ==
Year	Award	Category	Nominee	Result
1997	15th TVyNovelas Awards	Best Telenovela of the Year	José Alberto Castro	Nominated
1997	15th TVyNovelas Awards	Best Antagonist Actress	Chantal Andere	Won
1997	15th TVyNovelas Awards	Best Male Revelation	Carlos Ponce	Won
