= Juegos interrumpidos =

- Genre: Drama
- Created by: Socorro González Ocampo
- Written by: Fernando Garcilita; Silvia Pasternac; Tania Tinajero
- Directed by: Luis Eduardo Reyes
- Starring: Silvia Navarro; David Chocarro; Luis Felipe Tovar; Irán Castillo; Laura Carmine; Luis Gatica; Ian Andrade; Jorge Salinas
- Composer: Xavier Asali
- Country of origin: Mexico
- Original language: Spanish
- No. of seasons: 2
- No. of episodes: 20

Production
- Executive producer: Carlos Moreno Laguillo
- Producer: Hilda Santaella
- Editors: Pablo Peralta; Viridiana Murillo
- Camera setup: Multi-camera
- Production company: TelevisaUnivision

Original release
- Network: Vix
- Release: 30 August 2024 – 2 May 2025

Juegos interrumpidos is a Mexican streaming television series produced by Carlos Moreno Laguillo for TelevisaUnivision. It is an original story created by Socorro González Ocampo. It stars Silvia Navarro, Jorge Salinas and David Chocarro. The series premiered on Vix on 30 August 2024. The second season premiered on 2 May 2025.

== Cast ==
=== Main ===
- Silvia Navarro as Karen
- David Chocarro
- Luis Felipe Tovar
- Irán Castillo
- Laura Carmine
- Luis Gatica
- Ian Andrade as Arturo
- Jorge Salinas as Damián

=== Recurring and guest stars ===
- Vanessa Bauche
- Roberto Sosa
- Alma Delfina
- Otto Sirgo
- Alberto Agnesi
- David Calderón
- Fausto Espejel
- María José de la Cruz
- Adriana Makala
- Luciana Bautista
- Antonio Denetro
- Karolina Gutze
- Arthur Pratts
- Fabiola Rivera
- Axel Santos
- Manuel Riguezza
- Arturo Vinales
- Fabio Levy
- José Camilo Apolonio
- Manolo Bonfiglio
- Rodrigo Mendoza
- Fernando Manzano
- Andrea Pears
- Juan Carlos Tavera

== Episodes ==
| Season | Episodes | Originally released |
|---|---|---|
| 1 | 10 | 30 August 2024 |
| 2 | 10 | 2 May 2025 |

=== Season 1 (2024) ===
| No. overall | No. in season | Title | Original release date |
|---|---|---|---|
| 1 | 1 | "El auto rojo" | 30 August 2024 |
| 2 | 2 | "La iglesia de la estrella" | 30 August 2024 |
| 3 | 3 | "Mamá" | 30 August 2024 |
| 4 | 4 | "La fruta amarga" | 30 August 2024 |
| 5 | 5 | "La pelota de colores" | 30 August 2024 |
| 6 | 6 | "Una puerta verde" | 30 August 2024 |
| 7 | 7 | "La canción de cuna" | 30 August 2024 |
| 8 | 8 | "Aguja en el pajar" | 30 August 2024 |
| 9 | 9 | "El hijo" | 30 August 2024 |
| 10 | 10 | "La última pieza" | 30 August 2024 |

=== Season 2 (2025) ===
| No. overall | No. in season | Title | Original release date |
|---|---|---|---|
| 11 | 1 | "Victoria" | 2 May 2025 |
| 12 | 2 | "Ciudad Solares" | 2 May 2025 |
| 13 | 3 | "Un buen papá" | 2 May 2025 |
| 14 | 4 | "Honor, coraje y compromiso" | 2 May 2025 |
| 15 | 5 | "Culpable" | 2 May 2025 |
| 16 | 6 | "Retoño" | 2 May 2025 |
| 17 | 7 | "Marine" | 2 May 2025 |
| 18 | 8 | "Reencuentro" | 2 May 2025 |
| 19 | 9 | "La despedida" | 2 May 2025 |
| 20 | 10 | "Volver a ti" | 2 May 2025 |

== Production ==
The series was first announced in January 2019, during the NATPE 2019 presentation. Two years later, it was announced that the series would be co-produced by Caracol Television and SOMOS Productions. However, on 17 October 2023, it was announced that TelevisaUnivision had ordered the series for Vix, with Carlos Moreno Laguillo as executive producer. That same day, Silvia Navarro, Jorge Salinas, David Chocarro, Irán Castillo and Laura Carmine were announced as the main cast. The series premiered on 30 August 2024. The second season premiered on 2 May 2025.

== Awards and nominations ==
| Year | Award | Category | Nominated | Result | Ref |
|---|---|---|---|---|---|
| 2025 | Produ Awards | Best Crime Series | Juegos interrumpidos | Nominated | |
