= Tiempos Nuevos =

Studio album by Irán Castillo
- Released: September 2, 1997
- Recorded: Conway Studios, LA (Mexico City) Sony Music Studios Mexico (Mexico City)
- Genre: Pop
- Length: 41:22
- Label: Sony Music
- Producers: Mario Figueroa Carvajal, Leticia Rio, Carlos Cabral (Junior)

Irán Castillo chronology
Tiempos Nuevos (1997)	Tatuada en tus besos (1999)

Tiempos Nuevos is the debut album by Mexican femme singer-songwriter and actress Irán Castillo, released by Sony Music in the United States and Mexico on September 2, 1997 (see 1997 in music).

The Sony Music label released "Yo Por Él" as the first single in Mexico which was very successful in that time. Following the singles "Locos De Amor", and "La Flor Del Paraíso" with a special remix.

== Track listing ==
1. "La Flor Del Paraíso" (J.R. Flórez, Fredi Marugán) – 3:44
2. "Soy Una Mujer" (Miguel Luna, César Lazcano) – 3:46
3. "Por Amor" (Herik Guecha) – 3:29
4. "Yo Por Él" (J.R. Flórez, Mauro Contarini) – 4:32
5. "Si No Estás Aquí" (D. Vaona, F. Vaona, David Santiestéban) – 4:41
6. "Por Mi Piel " (Herik Guecha) – 3:46
7. "Locos De Amor" (David Santiestéban, D. Vaona, J. López) – 3:49
8. "Devuélveme El Corazón" (Carlos Lara) – 4:28
9. "Si Yo Fuera Tu Chica" (Miguel Luna) – 4:12
10. "Tiempos Nuevos" (Herik Guecha) – 4:44

== Credits ==
- Irán Castillo: Lead and background vocals.
- Acoustic Bass: Alex Zepeda as a special guest
- Background vocals - Paty Tanus, Laura Barbosa, Mary Chuy, Magui Vera, Irán Castillo.
- Bass: Pepe Hernandez, Mario Figueroa.
- Sax Solo: Hammadi D. Bayard.
- Electric guitar: Carlos Cabral (Junior)
- Trumpet, Fluglehorn: Chucho Lopez, Hammadi D. Bayard, Felix Mendez.
- Mix: Isaias G. Asbun.
- Art: Cesar Saldaña Aguas
- Photography: Ricardo Trabulsi.
- Logo: Jose Manuel Ponce.
