= Confidente de secundaria =

Mexican telenovela

- Genre: Telenovela
- Written by: Susan Crowley; Sergio Schmucler; Ely Tadeo; Carme Sepulveda
- Story by: Carlos Aguilar; Rosa Salazar
- Directed by: Otto Sirgo
- Starring: Alexis Ayala; Irán Castillo; Flavio César
- Theme music composer: Carlos Páramo
- Opening theme: "Confidente de secundaria"
- Country of origin: Mexico
- Original language: Spanish
- No. of episodes: 135

Production
- Executive producer: Luis de Llano Macedo
- Producers: Fides Velasco Ibarra; Marco Flavio Cruz
- Editor: Juan Alfredo Villareal
- Production company: Televisa

Original release
- Network: Canal de las Estrellas
- Release: March 25 – September 27, 1996

Confidente de secundaria, is a Mexican telenovela produced by Luis de Llano Macedo for Televisa and broadcast in 1996 by Canal de las Estrellas.

The series stars Alexis Ayala as Quico, Irán Castillo as Jackie and Flavio César as Héctor.

== Synopsis ==
Confidente de secundaria tells the story about the lives of some Mexican high school students which are linked through a famous radio show.

== Cast ==
=== Main ===
- Alexis Ayala as Quico
- Irán Castillo as Jackie
- Flavio César as Héctor

=== Recurring ===
- Julio Alemán as Simón
- Luis Gimeno as Ulises
- Hilda Aguirre as Marcela
- Margarita Isabel as Soledad
- Sergio Ramos as Eladio
- Ofelia Cano as Adriana
- Karyme Lozano as Marilú
- Charlie as Marcos
- Nora Salinas as Bianca
- Francesca Guillén as Belén
- Gerardo Quiroz as Polo
- Enrique Borja Baena as Yeyo
- María Luisa Alcalá as Connie
- Ricardo de Pascual as Anselmo
- Aurora Alonso as Delia
- José Luis Cordero as Apolonio
- Diego Schoening as Roberto
- Martha Aguayo as Mónica
- Beatriz Aguirre as Dinorah
- Julieta Rosen as Cristina
- Gustavo Rojo as Miramontes
- Alejandra Barros as Laura
