= Luz Clarita =

Mexican telenovela

- Genre: Telenovela; Romance; Family
- Created by: Abel Santa Cruz
- Written by: Viviana Pimstein; Celia Alonso; Lucia Campero de Mendizabal; Dolores Ortega; Alejandro Oribe
- Directed by: Pedro Damián
- Starring: Verónica Merchant; César Évora; Daniela Luján; Ximena Sariñana; Aitor Iturrioz; Paty Díaz; Frances Ondiviela; Sussan Taunton; Lili Garza
- Opening theme: "Luz Clarita" by Daniela Luján & Ximena Sariñana
- Country of origin: Mexico
- Original language: Spanish
- No. of episodes: 105

Production
- Executive producer: Mapat L. de Zatarain
- Production locations: Filming; Televisa San Ángel; Mexico City, Mexico
- Running time: 21–22 minutes (episodes 1–70); 41–44 minutes (episodes 75–105)
- Production company: Televisa

Original release
- Network: Canal de las Estrellas
- Release: 30 September 1996 – 21 February 1997

Related
- Andrea Celeste (1979); Chispita (1982)

Luz Clarita (Spanish pronunciation: [lus klaˈɾita]) is a Mexican telenovela produced by Mapat L. de Zatarain for Televisa. The series is a remake of Andrea Celeste and Chispita. It premiered on Canal de las Estrellas on 30 September 1996 and ended on 21 February 1997.

The series stars Verónica Merchant, César Évora, and Daniela Luján, co-stars Ximena Sariñana, Aitor Iturrioz, and Paty Díaz, with Frances Ondiviela, Sussan Taunton, and Lili Garza as the villains.

== Plot ==
Luz Clarita (Daniela Luján) is a sweet little girl who wants to find her mother and in her search will live through moments of great sadness and joy. Thanks to a series of coincidences, Mariano de la Fuente (César Évora)'s family decides to open the doors of their home to the little orphan and although at the start it would seem that said girl only had come to create chaos in their lives, little by little they realize that she has arrived in order to teach them, the children and the adults the most important of lessons: that love is the essence of happiness.

The process is not easy because Luz Clarita has her own problems: she is convinced that she is not an orphan, that her mother did not die as all seems to indicate, but that she is somewhere waiting to be reunited with Luz Clarita, and armed only with her faith, and with the silent complicity of Padre Salvador (Alejandro Tommasi), she is given the task of searching for her mother.

With the de la Fuente family, Luz Clarita creates problems with little Mariela who sees in her a potent rival, and since the first day she dedicates herself to making Luz Clarita's life impossible. In this house she meets Natalia (Paty Díaz), the young servant who is secretly in love with José Mariano de la Fuente (Aitor Iturrioz); Luz Clarita decides to help the two to realize their love for one another, and in Natalia she finds support and care.

In the course of her life, Luz Clarita encounters Soledad (Verónica Merchant), a young woman with a mysterious past who coincidentally arrives to work in orphanage on the very day that Luz Clarita leaves to go to the mansion of the de la Fuentes, and for whom Luz Clarita comes to feel a special affection, so much that, seeing the immediate feelings that Soledad and Mariano exhibit upon meeting, she decides to try to unite them.

The love and goodness of Luz Clarita encounter serious obstacles, like Brígida (Lili Garza), the strict housekeeper at the de la Fuente mansion, where alongside innocence there are always dark interests, like those of Bárbara (Frances Ondiviela) and Erika (Sussan Taunton), a pair of cocky women who are determined to conquer Mariano and José Mariano at all costs.

In addition to all of these obstacles, Luz Clarita fights to find happiness at her mother's side. While this all happens, Luz Clarita illuminates the lives of all those who have the fortune to meet her, as the darkness disappears with just a little bit of Luz Clarita (clear light).

== Cast ==
- Verónica Merchant as Soledad Martínez/Rosario Vertis vda. de Gonzalo
- César Évora as Mariano de la Fuente
- Daniela Luján as Luz Clara Gonzalo Vertis "Luz Clarita"
- Ximena Sariñana as Mariela de la Fuente
- Aitor Iturrioz as José Mariano de la Fuente
- Paty Díaz as Natalia
- Frances Ondiviela as Bárbara Vda. de Lomelí
- Alejandro Tommasi as Father Salvador Uribe
- Sussan Taunton as Erika Lomelí
- Miguel Pizarro as Roque
- Lili Garza as Brígida
- Tomás Goros as Anselmo
- Elsa Cárdenas as Hada Reina
- Adriana Acosta as Panchita
- Gerardo Murguía as Servando
- Evangelina Martínez as Prudencia
- Lucero Lander as Sister Caridad
- Julio Mannino as Bruno
- Margarita Isabel as Verónica
- Eleazar Gómez as Martín "El Chanclas"
- Esteban Franco as Arnulfo
- José María Torre as Israel
- Rocío Sobrado as Belinda
- Eva Calvo as Cata
- Graciela Bernardos as Mrs. Director
- Sagrario Baena as Hortensia
- Raúl Azkenazi as Rústico Domínguez
- Liza Echeverría as Dana
- Maleni Morales as Pilar
- Roxana Saucedo as Graciela Stockton
- Miguel Arteaga
- Ninel Conde as Elsa Cárdenas
- José Antonio Marros
- Sabine Moussier

== Awards ==
Year	Award	Category	Nominee	Result
1997	15th TVyNovelas Awards	Best Young Lead Actress	Verónica Merchant	Won
1997	15th TVyNovelas Awards	Best Child Performance	Daniela Luján	Won
1997	15th TVyNovelas Awards	Best Child Performance	Eleazar Gómez	Nominated
1997	15th TVyNovelas Awards	Best Debut Actress	Ximena Sariñana	Nominated

== See also ==
- Carita de ángel – a 2000 Mexican children's soap opera with similar storyline
