= Jorge Salinas =

Mexican actor (born 1968)

- Salinas in 2026
- Born: Jorge Salinas Pérez; July 27, 1968 (age 58); Mexico City, Mexico
- Occupation: Actor
- Years active: 1983–present
- Spouses: Fátima Boggio (m. 1995; div. 2009) Elizabeth Álvarez (m. 2011)

Jorge Salinas Pérez (born July 27, 1968) is a Mexican television and film actor, best known for his leading roles in telenovelas.

== Career ==
Salinas then enrolled at Centro de Educación Artística (CEA) in 1990 and after finishing his studies, he received his first opportunity in the telenovela Valeria y Maximiliano. He also appeared in the telenovelas El abuelo y yo (1991), Mágica juventud (1992), Dos mujeres, un camino (1993) and María Isabel (1997).

In 1999, Salinas starred in the main cast of Sexo, pudor y lágrimas and in 2000, he appeared in the film Amores perros.

Salinas played leading roles in the telenovelas Tres mujeres (1999), Mi Destino Eres Tú (2000), Las Vías del Amor (2002), Mariana de la Noche (2003) and La esposa virgen (2005).

In 2008, Salinas was one of the leading actors of the successful telenovela Fuego en la sangre, where he shared credits with Adela Noriega and Eduardo Yáñez. In 2011, he starred in La que no podia amar as the lead Rogelio Montero Baez.

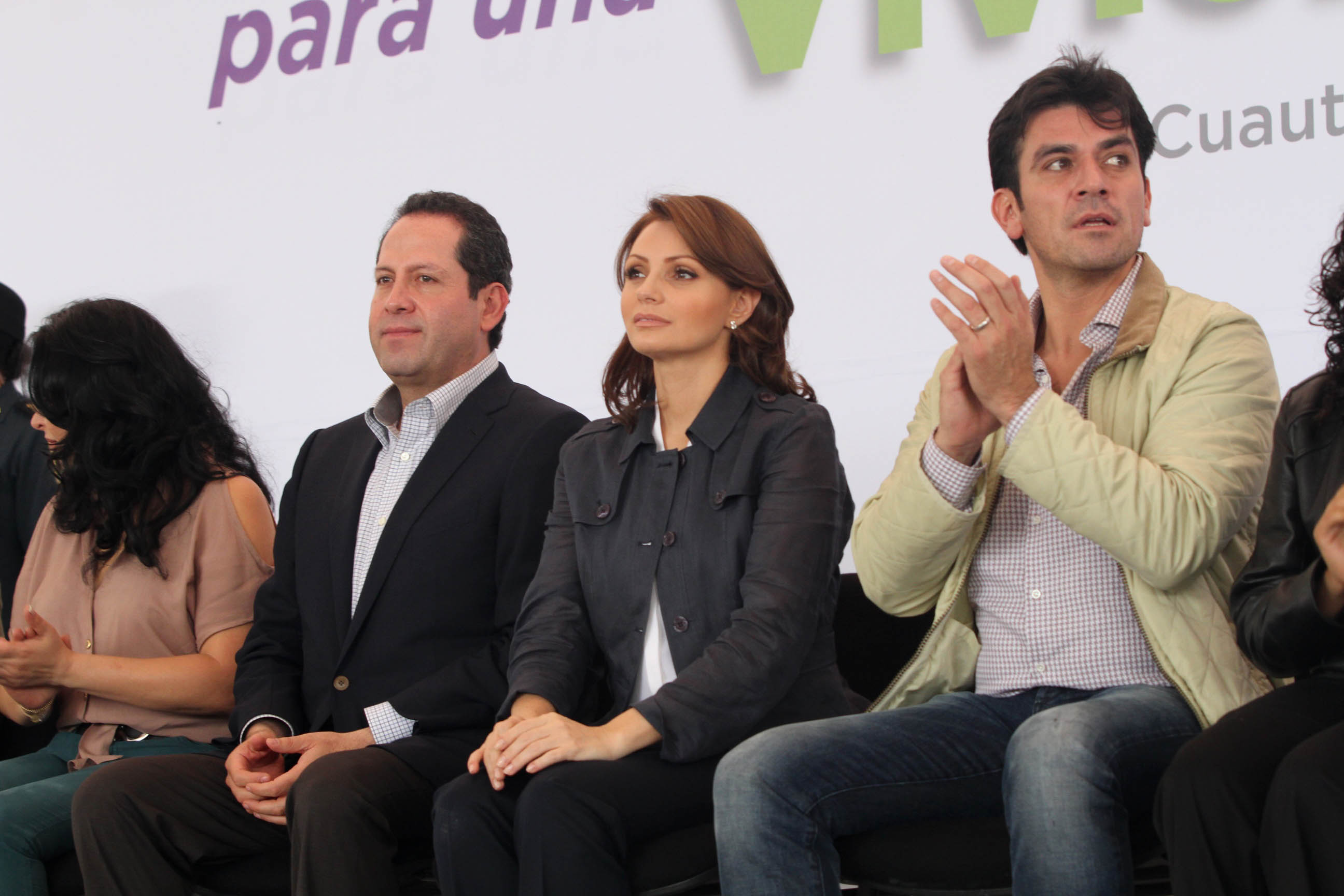
Salinas at a May 2013 SNDIF event with Governor Eruviel Ávila Villegas and First Lady Angélica Rivera

In 2012, producer Salvador Mejía Alejandre cast Salinas in the starring role for Qué bonito amor, a new version of the Colombian telenovela La hija del mariachi.

In 2014, Salinas starred in the telenovela Mi corazon es tuyo (My Heart is Yours). This won the best novela of the year. He played the protagonist,(Fernando Lascurian Borbolla) alongside Silvia Navarro (Ana Leal) and the villain Mayrin Villanueva.

In 2017, Salinas starred with César Évora in the stage play Variaciones Enigmáticas, written by Eric-Emmanuel Schmitt.

In 2019, Salinas starred in "Un Poquito Tuyo" as Antonio Solano with Majorie de Sousa as Juelita Vargas.

In 2020, Salinas starred in "Te Doy La Vida" as Ernesto Rioja Armida with Eva Cedeno as Elena Villasenor and Jose Ron as Pedro Garrido.

== Personal life ==
Salinas had a brief relationship with actress Adriana Cataño, and the couple have one daughter, Gabriella (born September 1995). He married Fátima Boggio in 1996; they had twin sons together, Santiago and Jorge Emilio (born 2005), before their divorce in 2009.

On October 15, 2011, Salinas married actress Elizabeth Álvarez, whom he worked with on Las Vías del Amor, La Fea Más Bella, and later starred alongside in Fuego En La Sangre. The couple had twins, daughter Máxima and son León, on December 2, 2015.

== Filmography ==
=== Films ===
Year	Title	Role	Notes
1992	Como cualquier noche		Short film
1998	¡Engañame!, si quieres	Sr. Gómez	
1999	Sexo, pudor y lágrimas	Miguel	
2000	Amores perros	Luis	
2003	La hija del caníbal	Security guard	
2011	La otra familia	Jean Paul	Nom— Canacine Awards for Mexican Actor of the Year
2011	Labios rojos	Ricardo	
2015	The Fifth Sun	Aaron	Pre-production
2018	Mi pequeño gran hombre	Leon Godoy	

=== Television ===
Year	Title	Role	Notes
1991	Cadenas de amargura	Roberto Herrera	Television debut
1991	Valeria y Maximiliano	Damián Souberville	
1992	El abuelo y yo	Ernesto "Neto" Sánchez	
1992	Mágica juventud	Héctor Granados	
1993	Dos mujeres, un camino	Ángel Lascuráin	Co-lead role
1995-1996	Morelia	Alberto "Beto" Solórzano Ríos	
1996	Canción de amor	Damián Ruiz	
1996	Mi querida Isabel	Alejandro Iturbe	
1996-1997	Mujer, casos de la vida real	Various roles	Episode: "El amor, siempre es el amor" Episode: "Hermanas"
1997	María Isabel	Rubén Álvarez	
1999-2000	Tres mujeres	Sebastián Méndez Morrison	Lead role
2000	Mi destino eres tú	Eduardo Rivadeneira del Encino	Lead role
2001	Atrévete a Olvidarme	Daniel González Rivas-Montaño	Lead role
2002–2003	Las vías del amor	Gabriel Quezada Barragán	Lead role
2003–2004	Mariana de la noche	Ignacio Lugo-Navarro Vargas "Halcón Luna"	Lead role
2005	La esposa virgen	Dr. José Guadalupe Cruz	Lead role
2006–2007	La fea más bella	Rolando "Ruli" Vargas	Recurring role
2008	Fuego en la sangre	Óscar Robles Reyes	Lead role
2011–2012	La que no podía amar	Rogelio Montero Báez	Lead role
2012–2013	Qué bonito amor	Santos Martínez de la Garza Treviño / Jorge Alfredo Vargas	Lead role
2014–2015	Mi corazón es tuyo	Fernando Lascurain	Lead role
2015–2016	Pasión y poder	Arturo Montenegro Rivas	Lead role
2019	Un poquito tuyo	Antonio Solano Díaz	Lead role
2020	Te doy la vida	Ernesto Rioja Armida / Miguel Hernández Flores	Main role
2021–2022	S.O.S me estoy enamorando	Vicente Ramos	Main role
2023	Perdona nuestros pecados	Armando Quiroga	Main role
2024	El ángel de Aurora	Antonio Murrieta	Main role
2024	Juegos interrumpidos	Damián	Main role
2027	Luz de mis noches	Aristeo	

== Awards and nominations ==
Year	Award	Nominated work	Category	Result	Ref
2000	TVyNovelas Awards	Tres mujeres	Best Lead Actor	Won	
2001	TVyNovelas Awards	Mi Destino Eres Tú	Best Kiss with Lucero	Nominated	
2003	TVyNovelas Awards	Las vias del amor	Best Lead Actor	Nominated	
2004	TVyNovelas Awards	Mariana de la Noche	Best Lead Actor	Nominated	
2009	TVyNovelas Awards	Fuego en la sangre	Best Lead Actor	Nominated	
2012	TVyNovelas Awards	La que no podia amar	Best Lead Actor	Won	
2012	Premios People en Español	La que no podia amar	Best Actor	Nominated	
2012	Premios People en Español	La que no podia amar	Best Couple with Ana Brenda Contreras	Won	
2012	Premios Canacine	La otra familia	Mexican Actor of the Year	Nominated	
