= 28th TVyNovelas Awards =

2010 Mexican TV awards

- Date: March 14, 2010
- Location: Mundo Imperial Forum, Acapulco, Guerrero
- Hosted by: Yuri

Highlights
- Most awards: Atrévete a soñar (4); Sortilegio (4)
- Most nominations: Corazón salvaje (9); Hasta que el dinero nos separe (9)

Television/radio coverage
- Network: Canal de las Estrellas

The 28th TVyNovelas Awards were an academy of special awards to the best soap operas and TV shows. The awards ceremony took place on March 14, 2010 in the Mundo Imperial Forum, Acapulco, Guerrero. The ceremony was televised in Mexico by Canal de las Estrellas.

Yuri hosted the show. Atrévete a soñar and Sortilegio won 4 awards, the most for the evening. Other winners Hasta que el dinero nos separe won 3 awards, including Best Telenovela, En nombre del amor won 2 awards and Los exitosos Pérez, Mañana es para siempre, Mi pecado and Un gancho al corazón won 1 each.

== Summary of awards and nominations ==
Telenovela	Nominations	Awards
Hasta que el dinero nos separe	9	3
Corazón salvaje	9	0
Sortilegio	8	4
Mi pecado	8	1
Mañana es para siempre	7	1
Atrévete a soñar	6	4
En nombre del amor	5	2
Un gancho al corazón	4	1
Los exitosos Pérez	2	1
Camaleones	1	0
Verano de amor	1	0

== Winners and nominees ==
=== Telenovelas ===
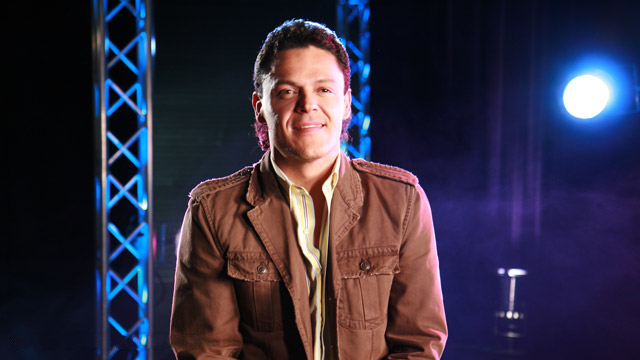
Pedro Fernández, winner for Best Actor

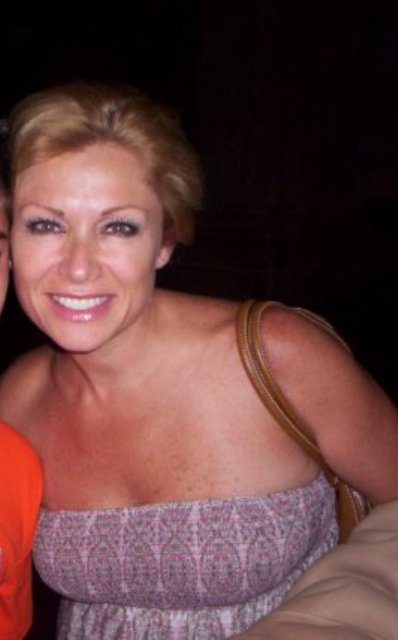
Leticia Calderón, winner for Best Antagonist Actress

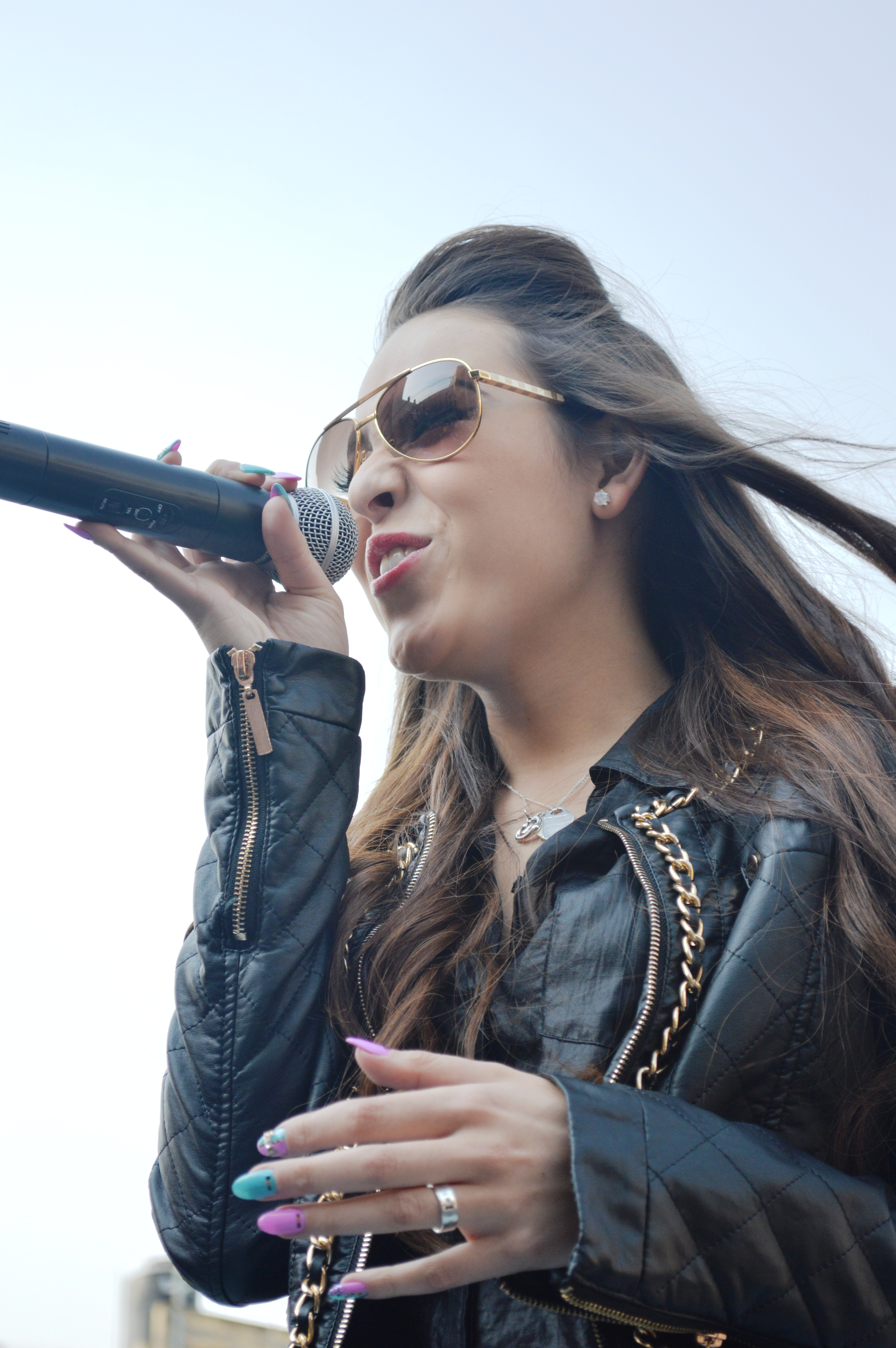
Danna Paola, winner for Best Young Lead Actress and Best Musical Theme

Best Telenovela	Best Musical Theme
Hasta que el dinero nos separe; Corazón salvaje; Mañana es para siempre; Mi pecado; Sortilegio	"Mundo de caramelo" — Danna Paola – Atrévete a soñar; "Hasta que el dinero nos separe" — Pedro Fernández – Hasta que el dinero nos separe; "Mañana es para siempre" — Alejandro Fernández – Mañana es para siempre; "Me enamoré de ti" — Chayanne – Corazón salvaje; "Un gancho al corazón" — Playa Limbo – Un gancho al corazón
Best Actress	Best Actor
Itati Cantoral – Hasta que el dinero nos separe; Aracely Arámbula – Corazón salvaje; Jaqueline Bracamontes – Sortilegio; Lucero – Mañana es para siempre	Pedro Fernández – Hasta que el dinero nos separe; Arturo Peniche – En nombre del amor; Fernando Colunga – Mañana es para siempre; Sebastián Rulli – Un gancho al corazón; William Levy – Sortilegio
Best Antagonist Actress	Best Antagonist Actor
Leticia Calderón – En nombre del amor; Altaír Jarabo – En nombre del amor; Aracely Arámbula – Corazón salvaje; Cynthia Klitbo – Atrévete a soñar	David Zepeda – Sortilegio; Cristián de la Fuente – Corazón salvaje; Rogelio Guerra – Mañana es para siempre
Best Leading Actress	Best Leading Actor
Daniela Romo – Sortilegio; Carmen Salinas – Hasta que el dinero nos separe; Daniela Castro – Mi pecado; Helena Rojo – Corazón salvaje	Luis Gimeno – Mañana es para siempre; Enrique Rocha – Corazón salvaje; Sergio Goyri – Mi pecado
Best Co-lead Actress	Best Co-lead Actor
Violeta Isfel – Atrévete a soñar; Claudia Troyo – Hasta que el dinero nos separe; Laura Flores – Corazón salvaje	Raúl Araiza – Un gancho al corazón; Gabriel Soto – Sortilegio; Mario Iván Martínez – Mañana es para siempre
Best Young Lead Actress	Best Young Lead Actor
Danna Paola – Atrévete a soñar; Angelique Boyer – Corazón salvaje; Maite Perroni – Mi pecado	José Ron – Los exitosos Pérez; Eleazar Gómez – Atrévete a soñar; Gonzalo García Vivanco – Verano de amor
Best Female Revelation	Best Male Revelation
Samadhi Zendejas – Atrévete a soñar; Gabriela Carrillo – Mi pecado; Malillany Marín – Hasta que el dinero nos separe	Sebastián Zurita – En nombre del amor; Diego Amozurrutia – Mi pecado; Pee Wee – Camaleones
Best Direction	Best Direction of the Cameras
Mónica Miguel and Karina Duprez – Sortilegio; Aurelio Ávila and Jorge Fons – Mi pecado; Benjamín Cann and Alejandro Gamboa – Los exitosos Pérez	Lino Gama Esquinca – Sortilegio; Armando Zafra – Un gancho al corazón; Luis Monroy – Hasta que el dinero nos separe
Best Original Story or Adaptation
Cuauhtémoc Blanco, María del Carmen Peña and Víctor Manuel Medina – Mi pecado; Fernando Gaitán and Emilio Larrosa – Hasta que el dinero nos separe; Martha Carrillo and Cristina García – En nombre del amor

=== Others ===
Best Entertainment Program	Best Restricted TV Program
100 mexicanos dijeron; 12 corazones; Hoy; Resbalón	Está cañón; Glam Girls; MoJoe; Netas divinas
Best Special Program	Best Series Made in Mexico
Ricardo Arjona desde el centro de la tierra; Elige estar bien; Mexicanas, mujeres de valor; Recordar es vivir	María de todos los Ángeles; El pantera; Los simuladores

=== Special awards ===
- 25 Years of Musical Career: Aleks Syntek
- 42 Years as a Producer: Enrique Segoviano
- A Lifetime on Stage: María Victoria

=== Special Event ===
- TVyNovelas Debut: Paulina Goto

=== Performers ===
Name(s)	Performed
Aleks Syntek	"Loca"
Miguel Bosé	"Estuve a punto de..."
Ninel Conde	"Mujeriego"
Pedro Fernández	"Hasta que el dinero nos separe"
Yuri	"Hacia la eternidad"

=== Absent ===
People who did not attend the ceremony and were nominated in the shortlist in each category:

- Aracely Arámbula
- Emilio Larrosa
- Fernando Colunga
- Leticia Calderón (Karina Duprez received the award in her place)
