= Chivo =

Chivo may refer to:

- USS Chivo (SS-341), a US Navy submarine
- El Chivo, a telenovela
- Emmanuel Lubezki (born 1964), Mexican cinematographer occasionally nicknamed "Chivo"
- Chivo, an electronic wallet - see Bitcoin in El Salvador

== See also ==
- Estadio Universitario Alberto "Chivo" Córdoba, a multi-use stadium in Toluca, Mexico, on the campus of the Universidad Autónoma del Estado de México
