= Solkin Ruz =

Mexican television actor

- Born: Solkin Ruz Ondátegui; 30 March 1991 (age 35); Mexico City, Mexico
- Other name: Solkin
- Occupation: Actor
- Years active: 2012–present

Solkin Ruz (born as Solkin Ruz Ondátegui on 30 March 1991) is a Mexican television actor best known for his role of Javi in the Televisa telenovela La vecina. His other notable TV roles include Yago, Por siempre Joan Sebastian as Pancho, Enamorándome de Ramón as Chava and Un poquito tuyo as Wisin Garcia. He also debuted in the Mexican film directed by Germán Quintero titled Como te ves me vi in 2017.

== Biography ==
Solkin Ruz Ondátegui was born on 30 March 1991 in Mexico City, Mexico. Before making his acting debut, he graduated from the Centro de Educación Artística de Televisa in 2012.

== Career ==
=== 2010s ===
Since 2012, Solkin has participated in additional episodes in television series such as La rosa de Guadalupe and Como dice el dicho. In 2015, he participated in the telenovela La vecina produced by Lucero Suarez, along with Esmeralda Pimentel and Juan Diego Covarrubias. In 2016, he has participated in series such as Yago and Por siempre Joan Sebastian. In 2017, Solkin debuted in the Mexican film Como te ves me vi, shared credits with Cristina Rodlo, Rocío Verdejo and Juan Ríos also he participates in the soap opera Enamorándome de Ramón, again produced with Lucero Suarez, along with Esmeralda Pimentel and José Ron.

In 2019, he participated in the soap opera Un poquito tuyo, alongside Jorge Salinas, Lorena Herrera and Marjorie de Sousa.

== Filmography ==
=== Film ===
Year	Title	Role	Notes	Source
2017	Como te ves me vi	Beto	Man role	

=== Television ===
Year	Title	Role	Notes	Source
2012–2019	La rosa de Guadalupe	Various	60 episodes	
2012–2020	Como dice el dicho	Various	42 episodes	
2015–2016	La vecina	Javi	84 episodes	
2016	Yago		2 episodes	
2016	Por siempre Joan Sebastian	Pancho	1 episode	
2017	Enamorándome de Ramón	Salvador ″Chava″	56 episodes	
2018	La piloto	Agente Delgado	Season 2	
2019	Un poquito tuyo	Wisin Garcia	60 episodes	
2019	Por amar sin ley	Beto	Season 2	
2021	Si nos dejan	Lucas Bejarano		
2022-2023	Mi secreto	Tony		
