= Hasta que el dinero nos separe =

Television series

- Genre: Telenovela
- Created by: Emilio Larrosa
- Based on: Hasta que la plata nos separe by Fernando Gaitán
- Written by: Ramón Larrosa; Ricardo Barona; Saúl Pérez Santana
- Directed by: Víctor Fouilloux; Emilio Larrosa
- Creative director: Ignacio Lebrija
- Starring: Pedro Fernández; Itatí Cantoral
- Music by: Carlos Páramo
- Opening theme: "Hasta que el dinero nos separe" by Pedro Fernández
- Country of origin: Mexico
- Original language: Spanish
- No. of episodes: 231

Production
- Executive producer: Emilio Larrosa
- Producer: Arturo Pedraza
- Cinematography: Ángeles Márquéz
- Editors: Juan Alfredo Villareal; Mauricio Cortés; Norma Ramírez
- Camera setup: Multi-camera
- Production company: Televisa

Original release
- Network: Canal de las Estrellas
- Release: June 29, 2009 – May 16, 2010

Related
- Un gancho al corazón; Llena de amor; Hasta que la plata nos separe

Hasta que el dinero nos separe (English: Until Money Do Us Part) is a Mexican telenovela premiered on Canal de las Estrellas on June 29, 2009, and concluded on May 16, 2010. The series is created and produced for Televisa by Emilio Larrosa, based on the Colombian telenovela Hasta que la plata nos separe written by Fernando Gaitán. It stars Pedro Fernández and Itatí Cantoral as the titular characters.

The series received several awards in the 28th TVyNovelas Awards for Best Telenovela of the Year, Best Actress, and Best Actor.

== Plot ==
The main character is Rafael Medina; he meets Alejandra Álvarez del Castillo when he crashes in to her car and sends it over the side of the road. He takes her to a hospital where he tells the doctors he is her husband for fear of getting thrown in jail for causing the accident. However, the situation worsens when Alejandra's boyfriend, Marco, shows up at the hospital and has Rafael arrested. In exchange for his freedom, Rafael has to pay for the damage he caused, thus he is forced to find a job so that he is able to pay the outrageous sum of money.

Alejandra makes a deal with Rafael and hires him to work in Autos Siglo so he can pay her back. Rafael immediately falls in love with her, but he has a girlfriend Vicky who is determined to marry Rafael even though he might not feel the same. Lucky for her, she has two older brothers and her dad, who own and work in a butcher shop, often intimidating Rafael to make sure Vicky gets what she wants.

After a series of events, Alejandra and Rafael both realize that they are in love with each other. The most memorable events include a party in Juchitepec, their trip to Puerto Vallarta, Jalisco, and of course their daily interaction at Autos Siglo. Many try to keep them apart, especially Vicky and Marco. However, both Vicky and Marco have cheated on their significant others. Marco does not love Alejandra, but wants to marry her for her money and hacienda, which is one of the most beautiful in the country.

After several events, another woman, named Marian Celeste, makes her appearance and eventually falls in love with Rafael. She tries to make him fall in love with her; she even goes as far as to wear a sexy bikini to seduce Rafael and help him gain clients at Autos Siglo. After many problems, love triumphs as Rafael and Alejandra get married. Together they get back to the now recovered house of los Alvarez del Castillo, which had been lost as a side effect of one of Marco's schemes to keep Alejandra and Rafael apart, and Rafael serenades Alejandra with the song that brought them together in Juchitepec.

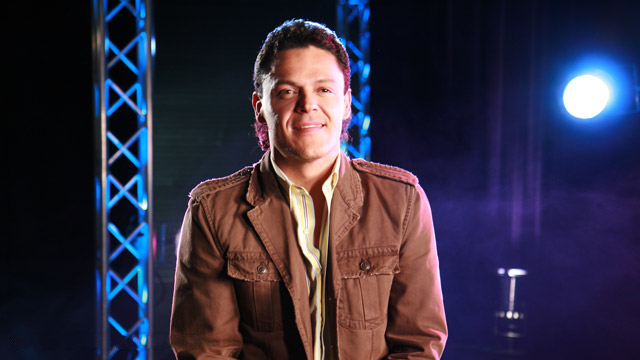
Pedro Fernandez.

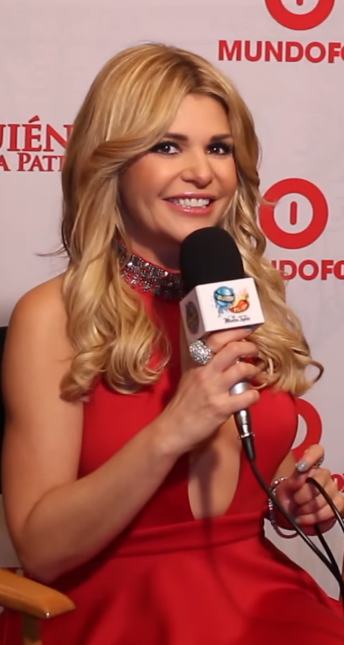
Itatí Cantoral.

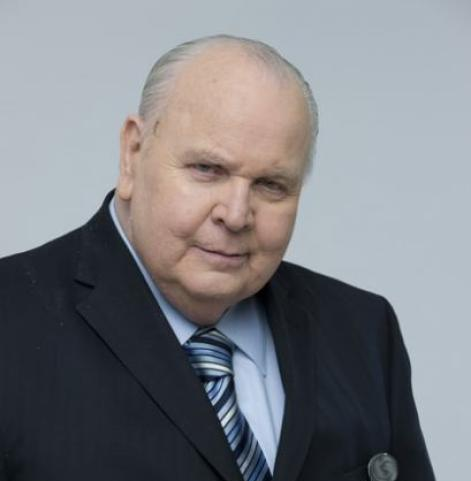
Carlos Cámara.

== Cast ==
=== Main cast ===
- Pedro Fernández as Rafael Medina Núñez / Manuel Rivera
- Itatí Cantoral as Lic. Alejandra Álvarez del Castillo De Medina
- Víctor Noriega as Lic. Marco Valenzuela "El Abogaducho"
- Luz Elena González as Victoria "Vicky" de la Parra "La Pajarita"
- Carlos Cámara as Lic. Francisco Beltrán
- Sergio Corona as Don Jorge Álvarez del Castillo
- Rodrigo Vidal as Jaime del Rincón Ferrán
- Lalo "El Mimo" as Vicente Chávez Méndez / Benjamín Rosas "La Rata"
- Sergio DeFassio as Ismael Dueñas "El Bebé"
- Harry Geithner as Édgar Marino "El Zorro"
- Carlos Bonavides as Ramiro Jiménez "El Ay Dios Mío"
- Joana Benedek as Lic. Marian Celeste
- Frances Ondiviela as Rosaura Suárez De la Grana "La Casada"
- Diana Golden as Isabel Duarte "La Generala"
- Carlos Ignacio as Germán Ramírez Betancourt "El Teórico"
- Claudia Troyo as Susana Hadad "Noninsita"
- Érika García as Julieta Medina Núñez
- Malillany Marín as Claudia Bermúdez "La Buenota"
- Héctor Sandarti as Nelson José Ospina "El Dandy"
- Ana Bekoa as Rubí
- Alberto Loztín as Efraín Zetina
- Ferdinando Valencia as “El Rizos”
- Agustín Arana as Daniel Zepeda de los Monteros Quintana
- Gaby Ramírez as Ovidia “Ovi”
- Pedro Weber "Chatanuga" as Don Gastón de la Parra
- Norma Lazareno as Doña Rosario Álvarez del Castillo
- Leticia Perdigón as Doña Leonor Núñez de Medina
- Carmen Salinas as Doña Arcadia Alcalá, Vda. del Rincón

=== Also as Main ===
- Ana Bekoa as Rubí
- Pablo Cheng as Bugambilia
- Éric Prats as Samuel Ocampo “Sr. Cabello”
- Julio Vega as Amador
- Rudy Casanova as Tadeo
- Ricardo Guerra as José Tomás Moreno “Pepeto”
- Roberto Mikel as Francisco de la Parra
- Fernando Manzano as Felipe de la Parra
- Íngrid Marie Rivera as Milagros Valtierra
- Alfredo Alfonso as Enrique Quintana
- Anghel as Elvira Jiménez
- Marisela Arriola as Jiménez’s mother-in-law
- Roberto Tello as Juan Tovar "Trapito"
- Sofía Tejeda as Azucena
- Elizabeth Aguilar as Doña Dolores Sansores
- Horacio Beamonte as El Gran Brujo Mololongo
- Marco Uriel as Lic. Humberto Urdiales
- José Antonio Iturriaga as Rendón
- Zoila Quiñónez as Ramírez’s mother
- Mario Casillas as Don Ignacio Rubiales “El Camarón”
- Gisella Aboumrad as Janet

=== Special participation ===
- María Elisa Camargo as Mónica Ledesma
- Alicia Machado as Karen Sandoval
- Pietro Vanucci as Guillermo Soler
- Rafael Origel as Frank, friend of Chávez
- Diana Herrera as Lic. Carmela Muñoz
- Raúl Ochoa as Lic. Antonio Gómez
- Susana Diazayas as Cristina
- Giselle Aragón as Daughter of Alejandra and Rafael
- Christian Chávez as Sergio
- David Bisbal as himself
- Galilea Montijo as herself
- Chef Alfredo Oropeza as himself
- La Sonora Santanera featuring Margarita, la Diosa de la Cumbia as themselves
- Consuelo Duval as Rebeca Madariaga "La Leona"
- Guadalupe Pineda as herself
- Lolita Ayala as herself
- Patricio Cabezut as himself
- Úrsula Prats as Manuela Olivares
- Jorge Arvizu as Isidoro Hernández
- Alejandra Barros as Lic. Alicia Ávila del Villar
- Sergio Mayer as Johnny Alpino “El Catrín”
- Lourdes Munguía as Laura Fernández del Villar
- Ricardo Barona as Hernán Linares
- Manuel "Flaco" Ibáñez as Casimiro Gutiérrez "El Guitierritos"
- Luis Gimeno as Lic. Fernando Bernal
- Tania Vázquez as Roxana Ferrón García “Roxanita”
- Mauricio Islas as Edgardo Regino
- Jonathan Rosales as Fluffy Guzmán
- Nahomi Salinas as La Jefa
- Ramón Valdés Urtiz as Germán
- Fabiola Campomanes as Lola Sansores
- Jorge Ortiz de Pinedo as Don Rafael Medina Santillán

== Awards and nominations ==
Year	Award	Category	People	Result
2010	28th TVyNovelas Awards	Best Telenovela Of The Year	Emilio Larrosa	Won
2010	28th TVyNovelas Awards	Best Actress	Itati Cantoral	Won
2010	28th TVyNovelas Awards	Best Actor	Pedro Fernández	Won
2010	28th TVyNovelas Awards	Best Leading Actress	Carmen Salinas	Nominated
2010	28th TVyNovelas Awards	Best Female Revelation	Malillany Marín	Nominated
2010	28th TVyNovelas Awards	Best Original Story or Adaptation	Fernando Gaitán and Emilio Larrosa — Hasta que el dinero nos separe	Nominated
2010	28th TVyNovelas Awards	Best Direction Of The Cameras	Luis Monroy - Hasta que el dinero nos separe	Nominated
2010	28th TVyNovelas Awards	Best Musical Theme	"Hasta que el dinero nos separe" — Pedro Fernández — Hasta que el dinero nos separe	Nominated
2010	Premios Bravo	Best Female Actress	Itati Cantoral	Won
2010	Premios Bravo	Best Female Revelation	Malillany Marín	Won
2010	Premios People en Español	Best Telenovela	Hasta que el dinero nos separe	Won
2010	Premios People en Español	Best Refrit	Hasta que el dinero nos separe	Nominated
2010	Premios People en Español	Best Actor	Pedro Fernández	Nominated
2010	Premios People en Español	Best Revelation Of The Year	Luz Elena González	Nominated
2010	Premios People en Español	Best Couple	Itati Cantoral And Pedro Fernández	Won
