= Nadie como tú (TV series) =

- Genre: Telenovela
- Based on: Espírito Indomável by Sandra Santos
- Written by: Antonio Abascal; Carlos Daniel González; Dante Hernández Miranda; Sol Rubí Santillana; Claudia E. Pérez Salinas
- Directed by: Juan Pablo Blanco; Claudia Elisa Aguilar
- Starring: Eduardo Santamarina; Karla Esquivel; Brandon Peniche; Diego Olivera; Alejandra Barros; Irina Baeva; Iván Arana; Elizabeth Álvarez
- Theme music composer: Jorge Eduardo Murguía; Mauricio L. Arriaga
- Opening theme: "Nadie como tú" by Majo Aguilar
- Composers: Jorge Eduardo Murguía; Mauricio L. Arriaga; Ricardo Larrea
- Country of origin: Mexico
- Original language: Spanish
- No. of seasons: 1
- No. of episodes: 122

Production
- Executive producer: Ignacio Sada Madero
- Producer: Arturo Pedraza Loera
- Editors: Israel Flores Ordaz; Luis Antonio Paz
- Production company: TelevisaUnivision

Original release
- Network: Las Estrellas
- Release: 14 August 2023 – 28 January 2024

Nadie como tú (English title: One of a Kind) is a Mexican telenovela produced by Ignacio Sada Madero for TelevisaUnivision. The series is based on the 2010 Portuguese telenovela Espírito Indomável, created by Sandra Santos. It aired on Las Estrellas from 14 August 2023 to 28 January 2024. The series stars Eduardo Santamarina, Karla Esquivel, Brandon Peniche, Diego Olivera, Alejandra Barros, Irina Baeva, Iván Arana and Elizabeth Álvarez.

== Plot ==
Twenty-one years ago, Raimundo Madrigal and José María Figueroa move to San Miguel Arcángel with their families to become mezcal producers. Teresa, Ramundo's wife, has an affair with José María and when Raimundo finds out he attacks her. Teresa flees with her children, but Raimundo pursues her and causes a car accident where Bianca, the youngest of the Madrigals, is left for dead. Bianca is rescued by Eréndira, who takes her home to pass her off as her deceased daughter, Ximena. Meanwhile, Teresa decides to distance herself from José María and stay with Raimundo. Having been accused of witchcraft, Eréndira escapes with Hugo and Bianca (Ximena), and finds a job at the Figueroa estate. Years later, Ximena falls in love with Salvador, José María's son. Eréndira confesses to Ximena that she is actually Bianca Madrigal, causing Ximena to doubt her entire life. The hatred between the Madrigals and the Figueroas is reignited with the revelation of Ximena's origin, which prevents her and Salvador from being together.

== Cast ==
=== Main ===
- Eduardo Santamarina as Raimundo Madrigal Canales
- Karla Esquivel as Ximena Santana García / Bianca Madrigal Arreola
- Brandon Peniche as Salvador Figueroa Toledano
- Diego Olivera as José María Figueroa Arce
- Alejandra Barros as Teresa Arreola Villaseñor
- Irina Baeva as Romina Ortuño Vieri
- Iván Arana as Jonás Madrigal Arreola
- Elizabeth Álvarez as Begoña Toledano Maciel
- Daniela Alvarez as Jazmín Figueroa Toledano
- Ramsés Alemán as Eduardo Madrigal Arreola
- Paty Díaz as Eréndira Santana García
- Ricardo Franco as Tristán
- Claudia Troyo as Martha
- Ignacio Guadalupe as Aurelio
- Evangelina Sosa as Jacinta
- Hugo Aceves as Laureano
- Axel Trujillo as Néstor
- Fabiola Andere as Piedad
- Dayren Chávez as Celia
- Fernanda Bernal as Carmen
- Sharon Gaytán as Toña
- Guty Carrera as Fabián Armenta Rivas
- Tania Saenz as Lola
- María José Parga as Citlali
- Carlos Speitzer as Hugo Santana García
- Marco Méndez as Abel Miravalle
- Anahí Fraser as Marcela Hidalgo
- Felipe Nájera as Claudio
- Roberto Tello as Laredo

=== Recurring and guest stars ===
- Hans Gaitan as Matías Figueroa Toledano
- Daniel Rascón
- Paulina de Labra
- Alejandra Jurado
- Martín Rojas
- George López
- Horacio Beamonte
- Priscila Gee
- Pepe Olivares
- Khiabet Peniche
- Eva Daniela as Lorena
- Lalo Zayas
- José Montini
- Rocío Gallardo
- Luis Felipe Montoya
- Eduardo Marbán

== Production ==
In February 2023, it was reported that Ignacio Sada Madero had begun pre-production on his next telenovela. On 15 March 2023, Brandon Peniche was announced in the lead role, with Irina Baeva being cast as the antagonist of the story. On 24 March 2023, Karla Esquivel was announced to star opposite of Peniche. Filming began on 8 May 2023.

== Ratings ==
Season	Timeslot (CT)	Episodes	First aired		Last aired	
Season	Timeslot (CT)	Episodes	Date	Viewers (millions)	Date	Viewers (millions)
1	Mon–Fri 4:30 p.m.	122	14 August 2023	5.2	28 January 2024	4.1

== Episodes ==
No.	Title	Original release date
1	"Ella es Ximena"	14 August 2023 (Note: Premiered early online through Las Estrellas website on 11 August 2023.)
With Begoña's help, Raimundo discovers that José María and Teresa are seeing each other behind his back and confronts them. Teresa suffers an accident in which she believes that Bianca loses her life, but in reality she is rescued by Eréndira, who decides to adopt her as Ximena. Eréndira asks José María for help to flee from Raimundo, but he decides to take them in as part of his family. Years later, Ximena is reunited with Salvador.
2	"¡Mataron a mi hermano!"	15 August 2023
Jonás advises Raimundo to get rid of the ranch in San Miguel Arcángel, but he refuses so as not to forget his hatred for José María. Ximena overhears Romina and Salvador speaking ill of her and upon discovering her, she despises him. Raimundo interrupts Salvador's party and warns José María that he has not forgotten his grudge. Matías and Salvador go out to hunt coyotes but a shooter surprises them on Raimundo's orders and Matías dies.
3	"Estamos a mano"	16 August 2023
Raimundo shows up at Matías' funeral to enjoy José María's grief. Romina cannot hide her jealousy of Ximena and demands that she away from Salvador. As Salvador walks through the ranch, he sees Ximena swimming in the waterfall; he expresses his admiration for her, while she expresses her distrust. Raimundo learns that he lost the purchase of La Encantada, because José María made a higher offer to be close to his enemy and prove his guilt in Matías' death.
4	"¿Quién era esa mujer?"	17 August 2023
José María assures Ximena that justice will be done for Matías' death, but she wants it to be by her own hand and Salvador opposes. Begoña tells Romina that Ximena is interested in Salvador, but asks her to stay at the ranch to get rid of her. Teresa arrives at La Encantada and is surprised to see José María again. Raimundo finds Ximena walking around his land and threatens to kill her, but Salvador defends her.
5	"Tan bonita y tan fiera"	18 August 2023
Hugo sees the argument between Ximena and Salvador, so he puts a stop to him to prevent Ximena from getting hurt. José María denounces Raimundo for the threats against his people. Begoña manages to sneak her lover into the ranch. After a few drinks, Salvador cannot resist Ximena's charms and ends up kissing her, despite his engagement to Romina.
6	"Fue un error"	21 August 2023
Salvador looks for Ximena to clarify what happened and affirms that their kiss was a mistake. Eduardo accompanies Jazmín to the door of her house, but this causes a problem between their families. Raimundo forces his son to denounce José María for what he did to him, but he refuses because he wants to avoid problems between the families. Romina warns Tristán that she will not allow him to kiss her again. Ximena enters Salvador's room and finds him in his underwear with Ximena.
7	"Quiero conocerte como amigos"	22 August 2023
Teresa visits José María at his house to ask him to leave, since they are guilty of a mistake. Raimundo sees Eduardo with Jazmín again and lashes out at her, due to the enmity that exists between the Madrigals and the Figueroas. Jonás finds Ximena in town and tries to approach her. Teresa reveals to Eduardo that she had an affair with José María. Salvador finds Ximena talking to Jonás and confronts them to find out what is going on between them.
8	"Yo soy la mujer de su vida"	23 August 2023
After being caught with Fabián, Begoña reveals to Romina that she wants to win José María's heart again. Salvador can't stand seeing Jonás next to Ximena and confronts him, Jonás pulls out a gun, but Ximena prevents things from getting out of control. Romina tells Ximena that she will marry Salvador, and Ximena reveals that she kissed Salvador.
9	"He decidido quedarme"	24 August 2023
Romina is disappointed to learn that Salvador did indeed kiss Ximena. Salvador confronts Ximena for telling Romina that he kissed her and questions her about whether she is interested in his family's money, she slaps him. Romina wants to leave the ranch, but Salvador opposes because he insists that his family needs him. Faced with his refusal, Romina asks him to choose between her or Ximena. In the middle of a family dinner, Salvador reveals that he has decided to stay at the ranch even though it could change his life completely.
10	"Jugar con fuego"	25 August 2023
Romina wants to leave Salvador, but he asks her to stay in Matatlan and help the community. Although Ximena and Salvador are happy because they will spend more time together, everything ends when they talk about their love life. Begoña asks Romina to respect Salvador's decision and stay at the ranch to prevent Ximena from getting her way. Teresa confronts Raimundo and defends herself against the accusations against her. Desperate, Teresa asks Eduardo to take a message to José María. Romina looks for Tristán and proposes to spend some time together without anyone knowing.
11	"Jonás me gusta"	28 August 2023
José María is surprised by Teresa's decision to win back Raimundo's love. Carmen makes a jealous scene with Jonás after seeing him with Ximena. Romina tells Salvador that she wants to stay in Matatlan with him. Ximena explains to her godfather the reasons for her closeness to Jonás and admits that she likes him, which surprises Salvador.
12	"El que juega con fuego se quema"	29 August 2023
Raimundo assures Teresa that if she wants to be a good wife, she will have to fulfill him as a woman, but she resists. Ximena tells José María her plans to get closer to Jonás to find out if the Madrigals planned Matías' death. Jazmín questions José María about the type of relationship he had with Teresa in the past, but he refuses to reveal anything. Teresa decides to attend talks with the father of the town with Raimundo and runs into José María and Begoña. Ximena overhears Romina's argument with one of the craftswomen and discovers that she has stolen from her.
13	"No soy plato de segunda mesa"	30 August 2023
Ximena confronts Romina in front of the entire Figueroa family for stealing from the town's embroiderers, but is surprised by Romina's response. Ximena assures Salvador that he is not loyal to his girlfriend and puts him to the test by challenging him to kiss her. Begoña finds out about Eréndira's massages to José María and decides to confront her. Romina wants to spend some time alone with Tristán. Ximena insists on denouncing the Madrigals as soon as possible.
14	"Meter la nariz donde no llaman"	31 August 2023
Raimundo arrives home with one of his mistresses and throws it in Teresa's face, but she slaps him. Ximena and Salvador enter the warehouse where the Madrigals have the adulterated mezcal, but the presence of Raimundo's men has them cornered. Jonás and Carmela spend a moment together, but he cannot forget Ximena and this sparks a fight between them. Romina loses control when she sees Salvador next to Ximena. After arguing with Salvador for spending the night with Ximena, Romina seeks out Tristán to take out her anger.
15	"Dios nos libre a todos del odio"	1 September 2023
Romina pays Chelo for getting Toña to separate from Tristán. Raimundo and Commander Laurean show up at the Figueroas house to make Salvador pay for entering his property. Ximena takes the blame for what happened on the Madrigal's property to rescue Salvador, but Jonás stops her. Romina confronts Ximena for being involved in her relationship with Salvador and tries to humiliate her, but Ximena slaps her. Jacinta confesses to José María that Teresa is one more victim of Raimundo and he is willing to help her.
16	"Te amo Ximena"	4 September 2023
Ximena assures Jonás that she will not go out with him until he proves to her that he is sincere, Jonás tries to steal a kiss as proof of his affection. Salvador discovers all that Ximena has done for him to get him out of jail and can no longer hide his feelings for her. Ximena tells her mother everything Salvador revealed to her, but refuses to begin a relationship with him. Carmen bumps into Ximena in town and insists on separating her from Jonás. José María visits Eréndira at her home and tries to give her a massage, but Hugo suddenly arrives home.
17	"Lo quiero todo contigo"	5 September 2023
After a strong argument with Jonás because of his closeness with Ximena, Carmen faints, but Jonás ignores her. Ximena is willing to kiss Jonás in exchange for dropping the charges against Salvador, but he wants her to give herself completely. Ximena confesses to Salvador that she cannot return his love because she is in love with Jonás. Ximena assures the Figueroas that she wants nothing to do with Salvador and this causes Begoña and Romina's happiness. Eduardo talks to his mom about their plans to run away together, but Teresa is unaware that Raimundo is listening to the conversation.
18	"Lo mejor será terminar"	6 September 2023
Salvador invites Romina to a special dinner and this raises Begoña's suspicions of a possible engagement in the relationship. Raimundo runs into Eréndira in town and asks her to stay away. Salvador surprises Romina by asking her to put their relationship on pause due to his confused feelings, she slaps him. After the breakup with Salvador, Romina takes refuge with Tristan. Teresa falls asleep from the drink Raimundo gave her and this prevents her from escaping with Eduardo.
19	"No te vas a quedar con mi hombre"	7 September 2023
Salvador and Ximena have an argument because of the partners they each have, but Salvador assures that he will stay away to continue with his wedding. Carmen informs Jonás that she is expecting his child. After arguing with Romina, Ximena takes a walk in the countryside and falls off her horse. Hugo insists on knowing what happened between his mother and Raimundo and gives him a strong warning. Salvador finds Ximena injured in the middle of the field and this causes a closeness between them.
20	"Hasta que la muerte nos separe"	8 September 2023
Salvador questions Romina about whether she caused Ximena to fall off the horse. Romina asks Begoña for help to stay by Salvador's side; when she refuses, Romina threatens Begoña with revealing her secret. José María follows Jazmín to Eduardo's hotel and finds her in a compromising situation. Jonás kills Carmen, but is almost caught by Ximena who is nearby.
21	"Quiero besarte"	11 September 2023
Jacinta is worried because Carmen doesn't show up and asks Jonás to explain what kind of relationship they have. Jonás keeps his word to get Nestor out of jail and kisses Ximena; Salvador sees them and is jealous. Toña is back in town and wants to give herself to Tristán.
22	"¡Tú eres Bianca!"	12 September 2023
Salvador doubts Ximena's feelings for Jonás and questions her. Jonás enters Carmen's house and finds her diary, but he is in danger of being discovered. Romina sends a compromising audio to Tristán, but Toña could find out about their affair. Eduardo questions his father about Teresa's health, Raimundo can't stand his accusations and slaps his son. Teresa wakes up, sees Ximena and assures that she is Bianca, her missing daughter.
23	"Te da miedo estar cerca de mí"	13 September 2023
José María insists that Jazmín not be near a Madrigal and tells her to stay in his house but she prefers to leave. Father Anselmo exposes Tristán's sins to Toña. Jacinta arrives at the Madrigals' house and questions Jonás because she is sure he knows Carmen's whereabouts, Raimundo learns of this. Salvador tells Ximena that she is afraid to be near him, all this after sharing a room together.
24	"Tu corazón arde igual que el mío"	14 September 2023
Eréndira tells Hugo the truth about her past with Raimundo. Ximena and Salvador spend their first night together. Ximena receives a call from José María asking about Salvador, but she assures him that she is not with him. After Toña's comments, Romina calls Salvador to ask if he slept with Ximena, but he denies it. Salvador is jealous of Ximena's relationship with Jonás and complains about it. On the other hand, Ximena thinks it was just another night for Salvador.
25	"Me entregué en cuerpo y alma"	15 September 2023
Jonas can't forget what he did to Carmen. Eduardo takes Jazmín to the church to ask her to marry him. Hugo arrives at the Madrigal's house and threatens Raimundo for having caused serious harm to his mother. Ximena confesses to José María that she slept with Salvador, but José María does not approve of their relationship. Laureano finds Ximena in the hospital and comments that she is a suspect in Carmen's disappearance.
26	"¿Quieres casarte conmigo?"	18 September 2023
José María confronts Salvador for not telling him about his breakup with Romina and sleeping with Ximena. Ximena tells Eréndira that Teresa confused her with Bianca Madrigal; Eréndira fears that her secret will come out. Romina overhears José María's conversation with Salvador and learns of the latter's affair with Ximena. Romina asks Salvador for an explanation and wants to know if he is in love with Ximena. Eréndira confesses to Ximena that she was another of Raimundo's victims, reason why Hugo confronted him.
27	"¡Hugo es tu hijo!"	19 September 2023
Jonás begins to hallucinate Carmen everywhere. Jacinta warns Ximena that she could be the next one to disappear if she continues to be with Jonás. Eréndira looks for Raimundo to ask him not to send Hugo to jail, since he is his son. Ximena arrives at the Figueroas house to ask for their help for everything that is happening with her family and confesses the crime that Raimundo committed with Eréndira.
28	"Sí voy a ser tu esposa"	20 September 2023
While caring for Hugo, Eréndira remembers how Raimundo ended her happiness and her family. Romina confronts Ximena about her closeness to Salvador and gives her an ultimatum. Raimundo assures Eréndira that he will drop the charges against Hugo in exchange for her never knowing his origin. Begoña throws Fabián out of her house for having slept with Lola. He prepares to leave, but first he confesses to her family that she is not in poor health. Ximena knocks Jonás unconscious with a strong substance so she can check his phone.
29	"Acabas de firmar tu sentencia de muerte"	21 September 2023
Ximena goes to the Madrigal's house to put Raimundo in his place for what he did against her family. Salvador tries to settle Raimundo and Ximena's argument, but Raimundo demands that Ximena apologize or he will send Hugo to jail. Eduardo discovers that his mother is once again unconscious and threatens to denounce the clinic where she is. Romina overhears the farm workers talking about Ximena's betrayal and discovers the video of her with Jonás at a hotel and sends it to Salvador.
30	"Te están viendo la cara"	22 September 2023
Romina tells Salvador that Ximena is engaged to Jonás. Salvador confronts Ximena for lying to him about her feelings and getting engaged to Jonás. Eduardo and Jazmin arrive at the clinic where Teresa is hospitalized, but are not allowed to enter. Eduardo looks for Salvador to help him get his mother out of the clinic, but José María is upset to see him. Romina looks for Jonás to reveal that Ximena slept with Salvador.
31	"No acepto perderte"	25 September 2023
Jonás questions Ximena about her supposed relationship with Salvador and warns her that he could kill her if she does not marry him. Raimundo is desperate about Teresa's disappearance from the clinic and gets angry when he learns that Eduardo married Jazmín. Teresa confesses to José María that she lied to him about her feelings to protect him, in response, José María kisses her. Raimundo and the police arrive at the Figueroas house to question José María about Teresa's disappearance. Eréndira asks her son to forget about Jazmín because he could get hurt, but he refuses to see her happy with another man.
32	"El corazón es traicionero"	26 September 2023
José María surprises Teresa with a romantic dinner and they promise to fulfill all their dreams together. Salvador interrupts Jonás' serenade to Ximena and wants to know if their relationship is serious. Ximena heals Salvador's wounds after his fight with Jonás, but Salvador questions her to find out if her feelings are honest or if everything is a lie. Faced with Ximena's rejection, Salvador looks for a way to recover his relationship with Romina.
33	"Eres una cazafortunas"	27 September 2023
José María and Teresa argue over Eduardo and Jazmín's relationship, to which he is completely opposed. Romina goes through the belongings left by Jazmín and finds a letter for Ximena. Romina shows Ximena the letter in which Matías confesses his love and calls her the worst, Ximena slaps Romina. Teresa surprises José María with her decision to separate from him, as she wants to rediscover herself without the need of a man by her side. Hugo reads a newspaper in town and notices Ximena's resemblance to Bianca, the Madrigal's daughter who supposedly disappeared.
34	"A mí lo único que me interesa es el dinero"	28 September 2023
José María takes refuge with Eréndira after letting Teresa flee to the city. José María faces the accusations of his children for his infidelity with Teresa. Hugo confronts Eréndira because he wants to know the truth of her past, but she denies everything. Salvador confronts Ximena about her supposed relationship with Matías, but she makes him believe that she is a gold digger. The Figueroas lose all hope of justice after learning that El Aguila was captured in Mexico in critical condition.
35	"Ponerla en bandeja de plata"	29 September 2023
José María asks Ximena to clarify everything about Matías' letter and she reveals how she felt about him. Jonás forces Ximena to get married as soon as possible. Ximena tells José María that she will follow her wedding plan with Jonás, even if it costs her happiness. Salvador sees Ximena in her wedding dress and is disappointed to learn that she is going through with her plans to marry Jonás. Hugo finds Raimundo in the cantina and asks him to take a DNA test to find out if he is a Madrigal.
36	"Dejé ir a una mujer buena"	2 October 2023
Jonás finds Salvador in the bar and emphasizes that he will soon marry Ximena, which sparks a fight. Romina surprises Tristán in disguise and he gives in to her charms. Jonás confesses to Eduardo about everything that is going on in his mind and fears he is losing his sanity. Salvador wants to spend the night at Romina's side, but they are spied on by Ximena, who is heartbroken to hear this.
37	"Vas a conocer mi lado malo"	3 October 2023
Ximena receives a call from Jonás, but notices Salvador's presence, so she lies about her feelings. In the middle of an argument, Ximena admits that it was a mistake to have spent the night with Salvador. Begoña's plans are still in place to pretend she is sick, but Fabián questions her about the doctor's interests. In the middle of an argument with his father, Eduardo lashes out at Raimundo, but Jazmín intervenes and Eduardo hits her by mistake.
38	"Ojalá nunca te hubiera conocido"	4 October 2023
Hugo asks Jazmín what happened to her face, Eduardo admits that he hit her. Ximena finds the dress and wig that Romina used to seduce Tristán. At the moment of confronting her, Salvador arrives. Ximena confesses what she overheard when Romina was talking on the phone, but Salvador is not on Ximena's side. Ximena insists that Romina only wants Salvador's money and believes that she could betray the family. Raimundo's men carry out their boss's orders and attack Ximena.
39	"Lo perdimos todo"	5 October 2023
Mario follows Raimundo's plans, but Ximena and Erasmo's lives are in danger when they are trapped inside the burning cellar. Ximena and Erasmo manage to get out of the fire thanks to the help of the ranch workers, but the mezcal production is lost. The doctors are unable to save Erasmo's life, this hits Ximena who is comforted by Salvador. Romina and Begoña decide not to back out of the lie they planned, even though it could kill them. Tragedy follows the Figueroas, but Salvador and Ximena promise to unite to get José María out of his misfortune.
40	"Punto de quiebre"	6 October 2023
Romina's surgery gets complicated and she goes into cardiac arrest. Judith visits the Madrigal's house and this makes Raimundo upset and he refuses to listen to her, but she assures him that he will not be able to avoid her. Laureano shows Jonás all the evidence he has of Carmen's death, so he decides to confront him.
41	"Los demonios andan sueltos"	9 October 2023
Judith follows Jonás to the cemetery to talk to him, but Raimundo prevents her from talking any further. Eréndira bewitches José María and gets him to look for her to make love to her. Salvador receives a call from Commander Barrera in which he confirms that Jonás sent Matías to be killed and swears revenge. Ximena wants to clear up misunderstandings with Salvador about Jonás, but they are interrupted. Eduardo manages to get into Raimundo's office thanks to Jazmín's help, the information he finds seems to benefit him.
42	"Quiero ser tu esposa"	10 October 2023
Judith demands a large sum of money from Raimundo or she will reveal that he is not Jonás' father. Romina asks Salvador to marry her before she dies. After learning that Jonás is not his son, Raimundo tries to regain Eduardo's affection. Romina asks Salvador to return to Matatlán on her supposed deathbed.
43	"Romina es mi esposa"	11 October 2023
Raimundo spies on Eduardo and Jazmín's conversation, and discovers that everything is ready for Teresa to ask for a divorce. Ballardo reveals in front of the Figueroas that Jonás paid him to kill Matías, but José María wants to know more. The judge arrives at the hospital to marry Romina and Salvador. Salvador returns to Matatlán and although Ximena is willing to confess her feelings to him, everything falls apart with the news of his marriage to Romina.
44	"Una boda interrumpida"	12 October 2023
Begoña visits Teresa to confront her for having slept with José María. Ximena and Jonás visit the priest of the town to confirm their wedding date. Salvador seeks out Ximena to discuss their pending conversation, but is surprised by her decision to marry Jonás. The police interrupt Jonás and Ximena's wedding to arrest Jonás for the death of Matías.
45	"Jamás me voy a volver a enamorar"	13 October 2023
Disappointed by Salvador and Jonás' lies, Ximena burns her wedding dress and vows never to believe in any man again. Jonás demands Raimundo to help him leave to take care of Ximena's betrayal and, upon his refusal, threatens to reveal everything he knows about him. Hugo confesses to José María the rumors he heard about Eduardo stealing from Jazmín's accounts. Jazmín overhears Raimundo's conversation in which he orders someone to be eliminated.
46	"¿Quién te ha hecho tanto daño?"	16 October 2023
Abel meets Ximena, but she is suspicious of him and threatens him; he introduces himself and they end up becoming friends. Romina blackmails Salvador once again with the subject of her supposed health problem and asks him to marry her in church. Raimundo orders to end Ballardo's life and thus eliminate any relationship that could send him to jail. Teresa seeks a new look that will make her leave her past behind. Raimundo assures that he lied about the possibility of helping Jonás get out of jail and could leave him there forever.
47	"Un impulso muy fuerte"	17 October 2023
Jonás confesses his crime in front of the police, all thanks to Jacinta and Aurelio setting him up. Salvador believes that Abel's intentions are not the best, but Ximena defends him. Abel discovers that Salvador is jealous of his presence at the ranch and his closeness with Ximena. Jacinta and Aurelio are determined to leave the Madrigal ranch because of the accusation against Jonás, but Raimundo assures them that there will be justice for Carmen.
48	"Yo soy tu madre"	18 October 2023
José María surprises the Figueroas by showing up with Eréndira and her family for dinner and admits that he will share all the ranch's profits with them. Romina takes advantage of Ximena's presence to tell her that she will marry Salvador in church. Judith visits Jonás in jail and reveals to him that she is his mother. Ximena learns that Jonás accused her of being his accomplice in the warehouse fire and this calls into question her loyalty to the Figueroas. Abel visits Marcela, his ex-wife, and she complains to him for having abandoned her despite her condition.
49	"¡Jonás escapó!"	19 October 2023
Jazmín begs Hugo to withdraw the complaint against Eduardo, but Hugo says he can't because of José María's orders. Jonás gets an accomplice to help him escape prison. Tristán rejects Toña after learning that she has a husband and her pleas, Tristán assures her that their relationship is over. Salvador cannot withstand his jealousy of Abel after finding him in the kitchen with Ximena.
50	"Mal de amores"	20 October 2023
Noé arrives at the Figueroa ranch to take Toña away, Ximena and Salvador discover that she was sold when she was young. Ximena insists that Romina is lying and is determined to prevent Salvador's wedding, but Romina finds out and confronts her. Tristán confesses to Ximena that he and Romina are lovers. Ximena asks Tristán to gather his courage because they are going to prevent Romina's wedding, but a sudden phone call changes their plans.
51	"Vas a pagar con tu vida"	23 October 2023
Hugo overhears Ximena wanting to stop Salvador's wedding, but asks her to set her sights on Abel for his money. Ximena arrives accompanied by Tristán at the Figueroas house and he confesses to being Romina's lover, but Salvador and Chema do not believe his word or Ximena's. Jonás shows up at Néstor's house and takes him as his hostage so that Ximena can look for him. Abel discovers that Ximena is in danger at Jonas' side and confronts him. Seeing her marriage in danger, Romina lies and tells Salvador that Tristán abused her.
52	"La muerte de Jonás"	24 October 2023
Abel tries to rescue Ximena from Jonás but is shot by him. Hugo proposes to Raimundo to join forces to put an end to José María, but also asks him to be his heir. Salvador arrives with the authorities to take Romina's statement about what Tristán did to her. Hugo tells Teresa that José María lured Eréndira into bed with him. Romina tells Ximena that by discrediting her and Tristán, she will be able to marry Salvador. Jonás confronts Raimundo and Judith for their abandonment; Raimundo fights with him and mortally wounds him.
53	"¡Tú lo mataste!"	25 October 2023
Raimundo confronts Ximena for betraying Jonás and blames her for his death. Eréndira discovers Hugo is power-crazed and gives him a warning, but he threatens to reveal her secret. In the middle of a conversation, Ximena tries to get closure with Salvador, but he refuses to do so because of his love for her. Teresa seeks José María to clarify their sentimental situation, but ends up disappointed and prefers to end their romance.
54	"Trapos sucios"	26 October 2023
José María recognizes Ximena's effort and appoints her as the plantation's new master mezcal cultivator. Begoña finds Hugo in José María's office and confronts him about the powers he has in the ranch, but he manages to blackmail her. Begoña gives José María the document in which she cedes part of her property to Eréndira. Hugo tells José María that Begoña is cheating on him with Fabián.
55	"Las personas no son lo que parecen"	27 October 2023
Ximena and Salvador arrive in time to San Lorenzo to rescue Toña from Noé. Salvador confesses to Ximena that Abel has a criminal record. Ximena confronts Abel for lying to her and he explains what happened with his ex-wife. Tristán confesses to Toña that he never forced Romina to be together; Toña is disappointed and decides to end their relationship. Begoña complains to José María for having slept with Eréndira, but he points out that she has a lover in her own house.
56	"¡Bianca está viva!"	30 October 2023
Although Tristán denies any kind of aggression against Romina, the police find evidence that could get him into problems. Begoña seeks to rebuild her marital life with José María, but he only wants her as his business partner. Hugo tells Raimundo that his daughter Bianca is not dead and he knows her whereabouts, but in exchange he needs to be an heir to the Madrigal family. José María asks Ximena if she likes Abel, she admits to being interested in him.
57	"Me puedo morir en cualquier momento"	31 October 2023
During the confrontation with Romina, Tristán assures her that they were both lovers and that he did not force her to do anything. Romina gets dizzy in the middle of the confrontation with Tristan and the doctor reveals that she is really sick. Eréndira refuses to receive help from Ximena and is furious to see her with Teresa, her birth mother. Ximena asks Eréndira to tell her the truth about Teresa and the reasons why she does not want her to spend time with her. Raimundo visits Teresa to tell her that Bianca did not lose her life, but has an argument with Ximena. After confronting Ximena, Raimundo has a nightmare about his daughter's accident.
58	"Divina tentación"	1 November 2023
Abel confesses his love to Ximena, but she still hesitates because he did not tell her the truth. Salvador learns that Tristán could be released from prison and explodes with anger, demanding justice for Romina. Ximena finds her birth certificate and discovers an error with her age.
59	"¿Soy hija de Raimundo?"	2 November 2023
Ximena confronts her mother for hiding details of her birth and asks her to confess who her father is, Eréndira responds with a slap. Salvador tries to talk some sense into his father about Abel, but José María refuses because he believes he is jealous of him. Romina overhears Ximena and Toña's conversation in the kitchen and confronts Ximena due to her feelings for Salvador. Salvador receives the news that Tristán cannot stay in jail due to lack of evidence. Abel visits Marcela to clarify their relationship, but Marcela discovers that he receives a call from Ximena, so she decides to get rid of her.
60	"Todo o nada"	3 November 2023
Salvador cannot resist Ximena and they spend the night together. Eduardo and Jazmín find Hugo at the Madrigal's house, but are suspicious of his good intentions. After spending the night, Ximena rejects the men who have any romantic intentions with her, including Abel. José María looks for Begoña to end their relationship and ask her to formalize their divorce, Begoña slaps him. Ximena confesses to Martha that she knows it was wrong to spend the night with Salvador, but she cannot forget him.
61	"Estoy embarazada"	6 November 2023
Salvador is willing to talk to Romina and clarify everything about their relationship, but she surprises him with the news that she is pregnant. After talking to Hugo, Ximena remembers every moment she has spent with Teresa and suspects she could be Bianca. Begoña learns of Romina's pregnancy and questions her, but Salvador is determined to accept the child as his own. Toña overhears Romina's conversation about the child she is expecting and confronts her and asks if it is Tristán's child.
62	"Tú eres Bianca Madrigal"	7 November 2023
Ximena decides to clarify everything about her relationship with Salvador and both come to the conclusion to break up, despite their love for each other. Ximena insists Eréndira to tell her the truth about her past and Eréndira can't take it anymore and reveals to Ximena that she is Raimundo and Teresa's daughter. After Hugo's confession, Raimundo is furious and explodes against Eréndira for having taken his daughter away from him for years. Ximena flees far from the ranch, but Salvador finds her location. Ximena confesses that she does not want to be Raimundo Madrigal's daughter.
63	"Soy Bianca, tu hija"	8 November 2023
Toña finds Tristán after his release from prison and reveals to him that Romina is expecting a child that is probably his. Tristán assures Romina that if the child she is expecting is his, he is willing to take responsibility, but she is determined to prevent it. Eréndira regrets all the evil she caused Ximena and chooses to hang herself, but Hugo arrives in time. Ximena confesses to Teresa that she is Bianca, despite the latter's disbelief, she manages to recognize her daughter.
64	"Lo que hizo Eréndira no tiene perdón"	9 November 2023
Raimundo visits the Figueroas house to confront Eréndira and take justice into his own hands, but Begoña convinces him to join forces against her. Abel takes care of Ximena while she sleeps and she takes comfort in his arms, they are seen by Salvador. José María tries to resolve his situation with Teresa, but she is determined not to be with him again. Teresa arrives at Eréndira's house to question her for having taken her daughter away from her. The police arrive at Eréndira's house to arrest her for the crimes she committed with Bianca Madrigal.
65	"Quiero que defiendas a mi madre, Salvador"	10 November 2023
Abel confesses to Ximena that he is in love with her. Salvador questions Ximena for spending the night with Abel. Begoña visits Eréndira in jail to confront her for her crimes, which destroyed the Madrigal and Figueroa families. Romina tells Ximena that she does not believe her version of her origin and accuses her of being a social climber; Ximena responds by slapping her.
66	"Vengo a ver a mi hija Bianca"	13 November 2023
Ximena is determined to leave the Figueroas ranch, but a conversation with José María makes her think things over. Raimundo shows up at Teresa's house to talk to Ximena, but she refuses, claiming that there is no bond between them. Raimundo insists on getting to know Ximena better, but she refuses. Despite Salvador's insistence, Ximena does not want to see Eréndira. Salvador visits Eréndira in prison to talk to about the problem she is facing, but she admits her mistakes.
67	"Quiero a Bianca de regreso"	14 November 2023
Romina goes into Toña's bedroom to find out who is the man that she brought to the ranch, but is caught by Toña. Ximena visits Eréndira in prison to confront her for lying about her origins. Ximena visits Raimundo to clear things up.
68	"Eres una heredera, Ximena"	15 November 2023
Before Eréndira gets transferred to prison, Ximena forgives her for what she did to her. Raimundo proposes to Abel to be partners in the mezcal company and although at first Abel refuses, Raimundo puts him in a predicament because he knows he has no money. Romina questions Ximena about her relationship with Raimundo. Ximena tries to avoid any discussion, but everything gets heated with Salvador and Abel.
69	"No sé lo que siento por ti, Abel"	16 November 2023
Abel confesses to Ximena that he is in love with her and kisses her, but she is confused about his feelings. Begoña insists on making life impossible for José María and sleeps with Raimundo as part of her revenge. José María finds Tristán at his ranch and believes it is part Ximena's plan, just as Romina says, so he asks Ximena to leave. Hugo sees Ximena with Raimundo and decides to record them. Claudio wants to know if Teresa is single.
70	"Defenderé a Ximena con uñas y dientes"	17 November 2023
Salvador looks for Ximena and asks her to return to the ranch, but they are surprised by Abel, who is fed up with Salvador. Jazmín confesses to her mother that she is pregnant and Begoña does not miss the opportunity to hint that she wants to preserve the surnames of both families, as well as the fortunes. José María regrets letting Ximena leave his ranch and asks her to return.
71	"Vamos a incriminar a Ximena"	20 November 2023
Begoña questions Raimundo about whether he is still interested in Teresa and he assures her that he only thinks of her as part of his revenge. Hugo reveals to José María that Jazmín is expecting Eduardo's child. José María asks Jazmín to return home and raise her son as a Figueroa, but she objects. Marcela shows up at the inauguration of Piedad's mezcal production and slaps Abel in front of everyone. Ximena questions Abel after all of Marcela's statements, but he denies everything.
72	"Por obra y gracia de Dios"	21 November 2023
Salvador confronts Abel about the whole Marcela scandal and asks Ximena not to trust him. Several health problems occur on the day of the inauguration of the mezcal production, all because of the drink of 'Los Tres Figueroa'. Raimundo's plans go perfectly and he begins to blame José María for causing a health problem at the mezcal plant. Romina recognizes that she misses Tristán and decides to take refuge in Salvador's arms. Hugo confesses to José María that Teresa and Claudio spent the night together.
73	"Todo te puede incriminar, Ximena"	22 November 2023
Ximena and Salvador arrive at the hospital to find out the state of health of the municipal president, but they learn that he has died. Ximena is sure that everything was correct in the production of the mezcal, so Salvador suspects that someone adulterated it. Marcela assures Abel that she is willing to let him go in exchange for a night together. Raimundo surprises Abel by confessing that he knows all about the disappearance of the mezcal bottles that intoxicated everyone at the party, but he needs him.
74	"Aléjate de Abel para siempre"	23 November 2023
Marcela tries to convince Ximena to stay away from Abel and confesses that she spent the night with him. Abel gets tired of Salvador's insinuations, shows him that they are already business partners, and throws his jealousy in his face because he is with Ximena. Ximena confronts Abel for having spent the night with Marcela, but when he explains what happened, she realizes that she can never trust anyone.
75	"Ximena y yo tenemos una relación"	24 November 2023
Romina accuses Ximena of ruining the Figueroas mezcal because she is supposedly an accomplice of her father. Hugo visits Jazmín and assures her that he wants to be the godfather of the child she is expecting, which takes Jazmín by surprise. Abel asks Ximena to start a relationship and she responds with a kiss, without imagining that they are being seen by Salvador and Romina. Teresa visits Eréndira in prison to thank her for taking care of Ximena all these years, even though it was wrong to hide the whole truth. Salvador blames Ximena for their failed relationship, but she asks him to let her be happy.
76	"Siempre voy a proteger a Ximena"	27 November 2023
Abel asks Ximena to take their relationship as seriously as possible, which she accepts and is willing to make a life with him. Eréndira asks Salvador to fight for Ximena, but he respects her relationship with Abel. Eduardo and Jazmín receive the news that they lost their son and cannot believe the news. José María arrives at the hospital to support his daughter, but Jazmín throws him out because of the wishes he had for her son.
77	"Estás embarazada, Ximena"	28 November 2023
After a series of medical exams, Ximena confirms that she is pregnant with Salvador's child and does not know whether to tell him or not. Ximena dreams of the possibility of getting back together with Salvador and forming a family for their son. Hugo takes advantage of Jazmín's condition in the hospital to kiss her, but it all ends when Eduardo finds him and José María in the room. Jazmín receives a visit from her mother in the hospital and Begoña blames her for losing her child.
78	"Eréndira da su último suspiro"	29 November 2023
Raimundo sends Eréndira's food to be poisoned as part of his revenge for taking Bianca away from him. José María goes to the hospital to talk to Jazmín, but she asks him if he will accept Eduardo this time; he objects. Salvador gathers Ximena and Hugo to tell them that Eréndira died in jail, but immediately speculations of Raimundo's revenge arise. Ximena confronts Raimundo with a gun after learning of Eréndira's death and is not afraid to blame him out as the culprit.
79	"Quiero que Ximena sea feliz contigo"	30 November 2023
Hugo visits his mother's grave and complains to her for having preferred Ximena, even though she did not have her blood. Raimundo receives a visit from Hugo, but the latter claims that he poisoned his mother, but Raimundo denies everything. Ximena thanks Abel for all the love he has given her, he hopes she will soon be his wife. Salvador calls Abel to his house and assures him that he will never come between him and Ximena again, but she listens to them. Hugo lies to José María when he confesses that Eréndira and Ximena have tried to take advantage of the Figueroas.
80	"Ximena es inocente"	1 December 2023
Hugo generates doubts in José María and he asks to talk to Ximena to clarify everything, but Salvador asks him to think things over and not to make a mistake. Ximena faints in Salvador's arms after finding out what Hugo is saying about her. In the middle of her recovery, Ximena is about to confess to Salvador that they are going to be parents. Abel asks Hugo to stop telling lies about Ximena, but he defends himself. Teresa warns Ximena not to trust Raimundo. Toña cannot contain her joy and confesses to Ximena that she will marry Tristán, Ximena discloses that she is pregnant.
81	"Ximena está coludida con los Madrigal"	4 December 2023
Hugo finds the right moment and accuses Ximena of the worst, even though she denies everything, José María thinks poorly of her. Hugo gets José María to believe all his lies and Ximena is thrown out of the ranch. José María talks to his family because Ximena will not return to the ranch. Salvador reacts in the worst way and manages to get his father to kick him out as well. Ximena arrives at the Madrigal's house to confront Raimundo for manipulating Hugo and getting her kicked out of the Figueroa ranch. Ximena finds Hugo in the cantina and lashes out at him for damaging the image she had with José Maria.
82	"¿Quieres ser mi esposa, Ximena?"	5 December 2023
Salvador recognizes that he makes a great team with Ximena and takes advantage of every moment to be by her side. Abel asks Ximena to marry him, but she refuses because of the child she is expecting from Salvador. Salvador tries to make his father see reason for all the bad decisions he has made, but José María is blinded by Hugo's comments. Ximena demands that Raimundo cut her out of his will, but he refuses completely.
83	"Todos los Madrigal son iguales"	6 December 2023
José María does not want Ximena to be the master mezcal producer at La Encantada, despite Salvador and Abel's insistence. Romina questions Salvador about his interest in Ximena, but he is adamant about defending Ximena from any accusations. José María calls Eduardo to ask him to settle their problems, but this could pose a problem for Hugo's plans. Abel lets Ximena to know that his plans to start a family with her are still in place, even though she is pregnant with Salvador's child. Hugo makes José María believe that Eduardo hit Jazmín. José María loses control due to his condition and Hugo takes advantage of it to attack Eduardo.
84	"Te voy a refundir en la cárcel, José María"	7 December 2023
Hugo's plans continue to go perfectly and José María is arrested for making an attempt on Eduardo's life. Raimundo takes advantage of the fact that Ximena is in the hospital to tell her what kind of person José María is. Begoña makes it clear that she will not support José María and plans to throw all his mistakes in his face. Teresa visits José María throw what he did with Eduardo in his face and promises to throw him in jail if anything happens to her son.
85	"La vida de Eduardo ya no será igual"	8 December 2023
The Madrigal family receives news of Eduardo's state of health and although he is alive, he may not be able to walk again. Raimundo insists on looking for the culprits of what happened to his son and believes that everything was triggered by Teresa's infidelity with José María. Eduardo wakes up with the news that he will probably never be able to walk again. Teresa visits Eduardo in the hospital and he assures that the only thing he wants is to see José María in jail for what he did. Ximena confronts Hugo because she knows that he could be the person who acted against Eduardo and not José María.
86	"Acepto casarme contigo, Abel"	11 December 2023
Hugo needs money so that Mario does not reveal anything about Eduardo's accident and asks Raimundo for help. Ximena visits José María in jail, but he does not believe her words and asks her to leave. After talking about the future of their relationship, Ximena accepts Abel's proposal. Jazmín asks the doctors about Eduardo's chances of walking again, but the diagnosis is not encouraging. Salvador argues again with Romina because of Ximena.
87	"La ambición es un pecado, Hugo"	12 December 2023
Although Romina is still with Salvador as planned, she still thinks about Tristán. Begoña and Raimundo confirm their alliance and to make it formal, they will reveal to everyone that they are in a relationship. Eduardo refuses to receive help to do his activities. Hugo kills Mario so that he does not reveal the crime he committed with Eduardo.
88	"Te amo en silencio, Ximena"	13 December 2023
Jazmín tries to encourage Eduardo, despite his condition, but gets an unpleasant reaction because he asks her to look for another man. Abel discovers that Ximena is not wearing the ring he gave her and when he questions her, she assures him that she will wear it until everything is formal. Romina calls her friend to ask her to help her alter the results of her pregnancy and thus benefit from any inconvenience. José María receives a visit from his employees and they inform him that Ximena is now the master mezcal producer of the Madrigal house. Romina puts a pair of scorpions on Toña's wedding dress, all this when she learns that she will marry Tristán.
89	"Tú eres el padre de mi bebé, Salvador"	14 December 2023
Ximena can no longer hide her engagement to Abel and decides to tell Salvador, even though she knows it will break his heart. Toña arrives in serious condition at the hospital and they need to know which insect stung her in order to administer medication, but Romina uses her power to prevent it. Hugo corners Óscar for what he went to tell the prosecutor's office and to silence him, decides to kill him. Ximena looks for Jazmín to confess that José María is not to blame for her misfortunes, but rather Hugo, and Eduardo overhears this.
90	"Estoy esperando un hijo tuyo, Salvador"	15 December 2023
Jazmín wants to confront Hugo for ruining her life and surprises Eduardo by telling him that she accepts to separate. Ximena reveals to Salvador that she is expecting his child. Begoña demands Salvador to stay away from Ximena forever and give Romina her place, but Salvador surprises her with the news that Ximena is pregnant with his child. Romina lashes out at Salvador for cheating on her with Ximena and receives Begoña's consolation. José María rejects Ximena after getting out of jail, but Salvador confesses that they are expecting a child.
91	"El bebé de Ximena no va a nacer"	18 December 2023
José María assures that Ximena's pregnancy was planned because she is interested in the Figueroas money. Romina loses control and opposes the birth of Ximena's child. José María looks for Teresa to talk about his alcoholism treatment and she asks him to reconsider his hatred for Ximena.
92	"Vamos a tener una bebita, Salvador"	19 December 2023
José María meets Claudio who does not want to see him near Teresa and asks for explanations. Teresa confirms Raimundo and Begoña's relationship, but doubts their love. Jazmín goes to great lengths to find a doctor for Eduardo, but her hopes are exhausted. Ximena reveals to Salvador that they are expecting a girl and he cannot contain the happiness he feels.
93	"Tus horas están contadas, Teresa"	20 December 2023
Romina makes fun of Toña tfor not marrying Tristán and hints that she might be in for a surprise about the real father of her son. José María seeks help to stop feeling hatred and the priest of the town helps him and asks him to reconcile with Raimundo. Jazmín insists on doing everything possible to make Eduardo walk again, but he gives up on the idea. José María calls Jazmín to apologize, but she refuses to answer.
94	"No merezco tu perdón Jazmín"	21 December 2023
Tristán confirms to Toña that the child that Romina is expecting is his, this causes Toña to end their relationship. Ximena discovers Abel at the hotel with Marcela and wants to know the relationship that keeps them together. Romina avoids at all costs that Salvador intervenes in her health issues because he might find out that she never had surgery to help Begoña. Jazmín meets with her father and José María regrets everything he did.
95	"Raimundo es tu nuevo socio"	22 December 2023
Romina assures Tristán that if he does not spend the night with her, his son will be the one to suffer the consequences. José María tries to solve the differences he had with the people around him and one of them is Ximena, with whom he apologizes for his attitude. Abel refuses to give in to Marcela's blackmail, but she swears that she will do everything to stop him from marrying Ximena. Ximena goes to Marcela's appointment and, unbeknownst to her, discovers that Abel is an ally of Raimundo.
96	"Nuestra boda queda cancelada, Abel"	25 December 2023
Ximena questions Raimundo about the loan he made to Abel to invest in the Figueroas business and in disbelief, she decides to call Abel. Hugo is cleared of charges for what happened with Eduardo. Raimundo receives a visit from Hugo and although at first he does not believe his words, he is later entangled by Hugo's lies. Ximena confronts Abel for having lied to her about the money from the Figueroas business, which leads her to end their engagement.
97	"Tenemos que cuidarnos de Hugo"	26 December 2023
Abel swears that he partnered with the Figueroas with Raimundo's money all to save Ximena from the Madrigal's plans. Romina offers to talk to Hugo so that he can leave the Figueroas land. Abel confronts Raimundo and Raimundo swears that everything he says is a lie because he had no money to invest with the Figueroas. Begoña and Raimundo confirm their partnership in order to make José María's life impossible.
98	"Me llevé al baile a José María Figueroa"	27 December 2023
Ximena cries on Salvador's shoulder and ends up confessing to him that Abel betrayed them, since he is Raimundo's front man. José María begins to feel bad after learning that Hugo is the owner of his mezcal brands. Romina informs Salvador and Ximena that José María's health condition is due to the fact that he found out that the mezcal brands are in Hugo's name. Ximena arrives home and discovers Hugo's celebration, so she decides to put a stop to it by slapping him. Raimundo offers Hugo a sum of money in exchange for the rights to the Figueroa's mezcal, but the latter refuses.
99	"Raimundo y Begoña se casan"	28 December 2023
Abel arrives at Salvador's office, but is not well received by him, who asks him to stay away from his family. Raimundo and Begoña get married at the Figueroa ranch and José María interrupts the marriage to expel them from his house. Romina and Hugo promise to put an end to the Figueroas and Ximena, but they close their deal by sleeping together. Hugo's lawyer informs Salvador that Hugo's demands to return the mezcal brands are to become a partner of the Figueroas.
100	"Tenerte cerca es una maldición, Ximena"	29 December 2023
Tristán confesses to Ximena that Abel put himself at risk to look for the mezcal bottles hidden by Raimundo and she reflects on whether Abel was telling the truth. Salvador accepts before Ximena that he loves her and kisses her. Romina prepares a dinner to reconcile with Salvador and in the middle of this moment, they kiss, but they are observed by Ximena. Salvador rejects Romina and this causes her to lose control, to the point of confessing that she does not love him and only wants him to provide for her son. Begoña knows that Ximena is an obstacle in her life and tries to persuade Raimundo to leave her aside, but he refuses.
101	"Ximena aprende a defenderse"	1 January 2024
Ximena arrives at her new house, but Hugo wants to kick her out, Salvador follows her and defends her from Hugo. Ximena refuses to listen to what Abel has to tell her. Eduardo returns to work at the clinic, his first patient turns out to be José María, who asks him to forgive him for everything he has caused him. Raimundo bursts in on Teresa's sentimental moment only to humiliate her. Hugo takes advantage of the fact that Jazmín has left Eduardo at the clinic to go to look for her and tell her something that seems important, but he is hiding something.
102	"Ximena encara a Romina"	2 January 2024
Hugo's offers have a risk, at the same time that Abel gives all his shares to Ximena disinterestedly. Lorena warns Marcela of what Abel has done with his shares in the mezcal company and now they must think of something to fix it. Jazmín's attitude gives away that something has happened to her, so Eduardo manages to find out what is wrong with her, however, Jazmín prefers not to put him in danger. Elvira's life and her baby are at risk, so they baptize her son as soon as possible, pushing Ximena and Salvador as godparents.
103	"Ximena pierde la memoria"	3 January 2024
Ximena arrives at the hospital and her life could be at risk. Ximena's hospital stay causes problems among people in her close circle. The son of one of the artisans finds on the internet that their garments are for sale at exorbitant prices, but they have not received any profit. After being unconscious for a while, Ximena wakes up but does not recognize Abel.
104	"Ximena logra reconocer a Salvador"	4 January 2024
The forensic examiner manages to unlock Ximena's phone, but they are unable to find the video that Tristán was talking about, however, this begins to raise suspicions. Eduardo explains to everyone the situation of Ximena's health. Everyone goes one by one to talk to Ximena but she is already asking about Salvador, Abel on the other hand wants to convince her to marry him. Eduardo learns from Hugo that he was hired at the clinic because Jazmín talked to the doctor. After a pause in the visits, Salvador sneaks in to see Ximena, he tries to introduce himself but she remember him.
105	"Ximena comienza a sentir culpa al no recordar su pasado"	5 January 2024
Ximena's dreams about Salvador make her trust him unconsciously. Romina takes advantage of Ximena's memory loss and tricks her into believing they were friends. Ximena has returned home and sees Hugo, who acts hypocritically and plans to hurt her by deceiving her, taking advantage of the fact that she does not remember many things.
106	"Lo recuerdo todo, Salvador"	8 January 2024
Ximena manages to remember the bad relationship with her brother and fears for her life, but she already drank some of the tea he gave her. Ximena manages to get to the town clinic, where she is unsure that her daughter will survive the tea that Hugo gave her. Abel looks for Hugo to warn him that if he does anything to Ximena again, he will have to deal with him. Salvador informs Ximena that her daughter is out of danger. Ximena remembers everything that happened with Tristán and Romina, so she is ready to reveal everything.
107	"Ximena perdió al bebé"	9 January 2024
Romina looks for Eduardo to comfort herself in his arms, but he opposes any romance with her; Jazmín sees them kissing. Salvador confronts Romina and makes her see that her lie has been exposed. Jazmín goes to Romina's room to put her in her place, but she denies everything. Ximena makes everyone believe that her baby died to deceive Hugo. Begoña tells Raimundo that his granddaughter is not going to be born because of Hugo and Raimundo loses control with the news.
108	"Perdiste por tu soberbia, Hugo"	10 January 2024
Hugo tries to reclaim his place in José María's company, but is surprised to learn that his shares are worthless and that he fell into a trap. Salvador finds Ximena in Abel's hotel room. Salvador confronts Romina after learning of all her lies. Romina knows that her secret could come out since Salvador wants a paternity test. Raimundo prevents Begoña from leaving the house and compares her to Teresa, to the point of abusing her.
109	"A Romina se le castigará con la cárcel"	11 January 2024
Ximena manages to unmask Romina in front of Salvador and José María, so the latter asks her to leave his house. Romina admits to Salvador that she was Tristán's lover, but she will not let him see his son. Lorena shares with Abel the reports about the Figueroa's mezcal company and confirms that Romina has generated fraud in the company. Raimundo asks Ximena to give him her shares in José María's mezcal company, but she refuses and asks him to stay away from her. Romina is cornered by the artisans she swindled and they want her to pay them.
110	"La señora de Hugo Madrigal"	12 January 2024
Romina arrives at the hospital in serious condition after her confrontation with the artisans, but her vital signs are alarming. Tristán asks Toña to be his wife and she accepts. Hugo threatens Jazmín with harming Eduardo if she does not marry him. Ximena has a nightmare about Romina and Hugo as she thinks they are going to hurt her and her daughter. Begoña remembers the moment when Raimundo humiliated her and vows to make him pay.
111	"La muerte de Begoña"	15 January 2024
Begoña overhears the loud argument between Raimundo and Aurelio, but is surprised to learn that Raimundo killed her son Matías. Salvador learns that Romina never donated one of her kidneys to Begoña, so he decides to confront her. Romina accepts her mistake. Romina receives a visit from Laredo who makes her realize that she will have to answer for her crimes. Begoña cries inconsolably after learning the truth about her son's death and regrets having distanced herself from her family. Raimundo finds Begoña in his office, but this is all a trap to kill her.
112	"Quiero estar contigo siempre, Ximena"	16 January 2024
Salvador visits Romina in the hospital and warns her that he will report her to the authorities for all her mistakes. Hugo suspects that Raimundo has something to do with Begoña's disappearance, so he decides to investigate and finds evidence. The commander summons Raimundo because of Begoña's disappearance, but takes the opportunity to question him about other crimes for which he is accused. Jazmín accepts Hugo's deal to get married in exchange for leaving Eduardo alone. Romina wants to inject Ximena with a drug so that she can lose her daughter, but they struggle and she ends up injecting herself.
113	"No puedo perder a mi bebé"	17 January 2024
Salvador looks for Raimundo to ask for explanations of Begoña's disappearance, Raimundo assures that he does not know her whereabouts. Salvador receives the paternity test results of Romina's son and confirms that he is not the father. Romina's plans get out of control, after having lost her son and not being able to keep Salvador by her side.
114	"Ayúdame a escapar, Hugo"	18 January 2024
Raimundo demands Hugo to return the money for the shares he sold him, otherwise he could kill him, just as he did with Begoña. Salvador gives Tristán the paternity test of Romina's son, confirming that she is pregnant with Tristán's child. Romina asks for Hugo's help to escape from Matatlán or else she could betray him and reveal everything they did together. Ximena follows Hugo's steps until she finds him with Romina.
115	"Romina, quedas detenida"	19 January 2024
Romina and Hugo are arrested at the hotel where they are staying. Salvador visits Romina in the hospital to announce that the lawsuit for their divorce is ready. Hugo visits Romina in the hospital and promises to help her, but she must remain silent about all the crimes they have committed together. Hugo sends a package to Ximena with the intention of warning her of a misfortune with her child. Salvador finds Ximena and refuses to lose her, so he asks her not to get married. Abel lashes out against him.
116	"¡Ximena se fue de Santiago Matatlán!"	22 January 2024
Ximena assures Salvador that she will marry Abel, but avoids answering the question of whether she really loves him. Abel wants to know if Ximena will only marry him out of gratitude and asks her to reconsider if she is ready for the wedding. Salvador throws it in Abel's face that Ximena does not love him, this provokes an argument. Abel wants to know where Ximena is, since everything is ready for the wedding, but the priest announces that she has left town for good.
117	"No puedo seguir a tu lado, Abel"	23 January 2024
The priest gives Salvador a letter from Ximena in which she thanks him for everything they have been through, but she prefers to leave town for her daughter's sake. The police arrive at the Figueroa's house to notify that Begoña has been found dead. Raimundo puts a stop to Hugo for everything he is saying in town and assures him that he will never be at the level of a Madrigal. Raimundo loses control and swears revenge against José María after reading the letter in which Ximena disowns him as her father.
118	"¿Me extrañaste Ximena?"	24 January 2024
Hugo manages to find Ximena's location and intends to go against her. Salvador goes to the Matatlan police to demand Hugo's immediate arrest for fear that something might happen to Ximena. The police go to Raimundo's house to request proof of Begoña's death, but Raimundo refuses to cooperate. Hugo finds the cabin where Ximena is staying and plans to take revenge against her.
119	"Vas a pagar por todo, Hugo"	25 January 2024
Hugo has an accident that leaves him immobilized and Ximena takes advantage of the situation to hold him hostage. Romina recovers from her health problems, but her days in the hospital are numbered, as she will have to spend her recovery in prison. José María helps Teresa and Eduardo escape from Raimundo, but they are caught. Eduardo confronts his father and makes it clear that he is ready to leave the ranch. Ximena seeks help to have Hugo sent to prison.
120	"Hugo está muerto"	26 January 2024
Ximena seeks the help of the police to arrest Hugo, but on the way she meets Salvador who tries to help her, but they discover that Hugo escaped. Hugo decides to make everyone believe that he died in a fire. Salvador says goodbye to Ximena and wishes that she can be happy with Abel. Abel asks Ximena to be honest with him, she can no longer hide her feelings for Salvador and accepts that she still loves him. Raimundo wants to confront José María and so he confesses that he ordered Matías to be killed.
121	"Que Dios lo perdone, Raimundo Madrigal"	28 January 2024
122	"Te prometo una vida juntos, Ximena"	28 January 2024
Raimundo and Hugo's lives are in danger after their plans do not go as expected, both undergo emergency surgeries. Raimundo is sorry for what he did and apologizes to Ximena before passing away. Ximena confesses to Salvador that her plans with Abel are canceled. Everything starts to improve in Eduardo's life and Jazmin surprises him with the news that they will be parents. Salvador surprises Ximena with a reunion of family and friends to ask her to marry him. Romina needs to make a living, but all doors are closed to her, so her only option is to be a call girl. Salvador successfully resolves his separation from Romina and marries Ximena in church so they can live happily forever.
