= Un poquito tuyo =

Mexican telenovela

- Genre: Telenovela
- Based on: Tranquilo papá by Rodrigo Bastidas
- Screenplay by: Rossan Negrín; Daniel Iglesias; Berenice Cárdenas; Joaquín Casasola
- Directed by: Víctor Herrera; Felipe Aguilar; Pablo Chozas
- Starring: Jorge Salinas; Marjorie de Sousa; Lorena Herrera; Raúl Coronado
- Opening theme: "Un poquito" by Diego Torres & Carlos Vives
- Country of origin: Mexico
- Original language: Spanish
- No. of seasons: 1
- No. of episodes: 79

Production
- Executive producers: Aurelio Valcárcel Carroll; Agustín Restrepo
- Producer: Rafael Gutiérrez
- Editor: Marco Iván González
- Camera setup: Multi-camera

Original release
- Network: Imagen Televisión
- Release: 25 February – 17 June 2019

Un poquito tuyo is a Mexican telenovela produced by Imagen Televisión. It stars Marjorie de Sousa and Jorge Salinas. It is an adaptation of the Chilean telenovela titled Tranquilo papá created by Rodrigo Bastidas. Production began on 31 October 2018 and concluded in March 2019. It premiered on 25 February 2019 and ended on 17 June 2019.

== Plot ==
Antonio Solano is an extremely successful family father who comes from a humble family, so he strives to give his family everything he could not have in his youth. In his eagerness that his family does not lack anything, Antonio is generous to the point of spoiling his wife and children; as a result the three kids, Eduardo, Javier, and Viviana become good-for-nothing spoiled brats, doing nothing but spend the money in superficial things, while his wife Catalina only worries about staying beautiful with surgeries. To top, his own sister Leticia and her husband as well as Catalina's mother are on-and-off moochers of his wealth as well.

On the day of his birthday, Antonio realizes what he has caused when none of his loved ones remembers to congratulate him, and to top it off they only appear to ask for more and more. That's when Antonio finally snaps and decides to put a limit: from now on each of them will have to work to earn a living. His life falls apart with the arrival of Julieta, whom he almost hits with his car as she was running away from her wedding once she discovered the truth about her groom. Julieta becomes a person from whom he will not be able to separate.

== Cast ==
- Jorge Salinas as Antonio Solano
- Marjorie de Sousa as Julieta Vargas
- Lorena Herrera as Catalina Montiel
- Raúl Coronado as Elvis Ramón Rosales
- Thali García as Viviana Solano
- Alexa Martín as Madonna Rosales
- Daniel Tovar as Elton Rosales
- María José Magán as Elena Vargas
- David Palacio as Eduardo Solano
- David Caro Levy as Javier Solano
- Eugenio Montessoro as Francisco "Paco" Vargas
- Nubia Martí as Lupita
- Ariane Pellicer as Gregoria
- Christian de la Campa as Álvaro
- Carlos Athié as Mateo
- Eva Cedeño as Leticia "Lety" Solano
- Andrea Carreiro as Violeta
- Camila Rojas as Azucena
- Josh Gutiérrez as Beto
- Sergio Rogalto as Johnny Green
- Carlos Speitzer as Fonsi
- Solkin Ruz as Wisin
- Silvana Garriga as Rebeca
- Lucas Bernabé as Fabián
- Adriana Montes de Oca as Mileidy
- Daya Burgos as Sara Escobar
- Erick Velarde as Adrián Jiménez
- Edmundo Velarde as Iván Jiménez

== Ratings ==
Viewership and ratings per season of Un poquito tuyo
| Season | Episodes | First aired | | Last aired | | Avg. viewers (millions) | 18–49 rank |
| Season | Episodes | Date | Viewers (millions) | Date | Viewers (millions) | Avg. viewers (millions) | 18–49 rank |
|---|---|---|---|---|---|---|---|
| 1 | 78 | 25 February 2019 | 0.64 | 17 June 2019 | 0.46 | 0.47 | TBD |

== Episodes ==
| No. | Title | Original release date | Viewers (millions) |
|---|---|---|---|
| 1 | "Un poquito tuyo" | 25 February 2019 | 0.64 |
| 2 | "¿Crees en el destino?" | 26 February 2019 | 0.61 |
| 3 | "Esto es la guerra" | 27 February 2019 | 0.52 |
| 4 | "La verdad" | 28 February 2019 | 0.61 |
| 5 | "Hasta otra vida" | 1 March 2019 | 0.56 |
| 6 | "Cansada de ser pobre" | 4 March 2019 | 0.50 |
| 7 | "Solo amigos" | 5 March 2019 | 0.62 |
| 8 | "El límite de Cata" | 6 March 2019 | 0.47 |
| 9 | "El amor tiene su ciclo" | 7 March 2019 | 0.56 |
| 10 | "El amor te puede hacer caer" | 8 March 2019 | 0.49 |
| 11 | "Un peligro evitado" | 11 March 2019 | 0.49 |
| 12 | "Rivales en negocio" | 12 March 2019 | 0.51 |
| 13 | "Quédate con tu esposa" | 13 March 2019 | 0.50 |
| 14 | "Al rescate del hogar" | 14 March 2019 | 0.51 |
| 15 | "Mujeres resentidas" | 15 March 2019 | 0.48 |
| 16 | "Terapia fallida" | 18 March 2019 | 0.38 |
| 17 | "Adios a casa" | 19 March 2019 | 0.46 |
| 18 | "En defensa propia" | 20 March 2019 | 0.45 |
| 19 | "Sin mentiras no es amor" | 21 March 2019 | 0.43 |
| 20 | "La estafa maestra" | 22 March 2019 | 0.33 |
| 21 | "Desleal competencia" | 25 March 2019 | 0.37 |
| 22 | "Peor es nada" | 26 March 2019 | 0.48 |
| 23 | "La última cena" | 27 March 2019 | 0.55 |
| 24 | "Destinos cruzados" | 28 March 2019 | 0.48 |
| 25 | "Sin armas para dar batalla" | 29 March 2019 | 0.45 |
| 26 | "Hasta los golpes de ser necesario" | 1 April 2019 | 0.62 |
| 27 | "Divide y vencerás" | 2 April 2019 | 0.48 |
| 28 | "Yo mo a Elvis" | 3 April 2019 | 0.55 |
| 29 | "Amor consumado" | 4 April 2019 | 0.45 |
| 30 | "Un perdón termina todo" | 5 April 2019 | 0.49 |
| 31 | "Juicio a papá" | 8 April 2019 | 0.42 |
| 32 | "Aprendiendo a ser papá" | 9 April 2019 | 0.32 |
| 33 | "Nadie elige de quien enamorarse" | 10 April 2019 | 0.39 |
| 34 | "Accidente inducido" | 11 April 2019 | 0.39 |
| 35 | "Persona 'non grata'" | 12 April 2019 | 0.43 |
| 36 | "Daño permanente" | 15 April 2019 | 0.44 |
| 37 | "Un milagro para Javi" | 16 April 2019 | 0.40 |
| 38 | "La luz al final del túnel" | 17 April 2019 | 0.37 |
| 39 | "Termina la reeducación" | 22 April 2019 | 0.46 |
| 40 | "Mi lugar es contigo" | 23 April 2019 | 0.39 |
| 41 | "Destruiste a nuestra familia" | 24 April 2019 | 0.48 |
| 42 | "Nos quieren separar" | 25 April 2019 | 0.47 |
| 43 | "Tú eres mi corazón" | 26 April 2019 | 0.43 |
| 44 | "La cachetada" | 29 April 2019 | 0.42 |
| 45 | "Don Paco en el hospital" | 30 April 2019 | 0.42 |
| 46 | "Corazones rotos" | 1 May 2019 | 0.43 |
| 47 | "Javi mueve la mano" | 2 May 2019 | 0.42 |
| 48 | "Él es mi hijo" | 3 May 2019 | 0.38 |
| 49 | "¿Ya no me deseas?" | 6 May 2019 | 0.43 |
| 50 | "El otro papá" | 7 May 2019 | 0.45 |
| 51 | "Una visita inesperada" | 8 May 2019 | 0.43 |
| 52 | "Cada quien en su papel" | 9 May 2019 | N/A |
| 53 | "Me voy de la casa" | 10 May 2019 | 0.41 |
| 54 | "Mataron a Beto" | 13 May 2019 | 0.52 |
| 55 | "El beso" | 14 May 2019 | 0.58 |
| 56 | "¿Quieres tener hijos conmigo?" | 15 May 2019 | 0.48 |
| 57 | "Sol en casa" | 16 May 2019 | 0.54 |
| 58 | "¿No volverá a caminar?" | 17 May 2019 | 0.46 |
| 59 | "No estoy enamorada de ti" | 20 May 2019 | 0.45 |
| 60 | "Quédate con mi hermana" | 21 May 2019 | 0.51 |
| 61 | "Tenemos que decirle la verdad" | 22 May 2019 | 0.45 |
| 62 | "La peor noticia" | 23 May 2019 | 0.40 |
| 63 | "El reencuentro matrimonial" | 24 May 2019 | 0.40 |
| 64 | "Siempre serás el amor de mi vida" | 27 May 2019 | 0.43 |
| 65 | "¿Quieres volver a ser mi esposa?" | 28 May 2019 | 0.39 |
| 66 | "Están despedidos" | 29 May 2019 | 0.41 |
| 67 | "Nos besamos" | 30 May 2019 | 0.37 |
| 68 | "Bienvenidos a la joyería" | 31 May 2019 | 0.44 |
| 69 | "La primera noche juntos" | 3 June 2019 | 0.46 |
| 70 | "Viviana confiesa" | 4 June 2019 | 0.48 |
| 71 | "¿Quieres casarte conmigo?" | 5 June 2019 | 0.54 |
| 72 | "Una nueva oportunidad" | 6 June 2019 | 0.40 |
| 73 | "A corazón abierto" | 7 June 2019 | 0.51 |
| 74 | "¿Lo amas?" | 10 June 2019 | 0.36 |
| 75 | "¿Quieres ser mi esposa?" | 11 June 2019 | 0.40 |
| 76 | "Tenemos a su hija" | 12 June 2019 | 0.43 |
| 77 | "Vamos por Viviana" | 13 June 2019 | 0.47 |
| 78 | "El rescate fallido" | 14 June 2019 | 0.45 |
| 79 | "Episodio final" | 17 June 2019 | 0.46 |
