= Nicole Block =

Chilean pornographic actress and model (born 1989)

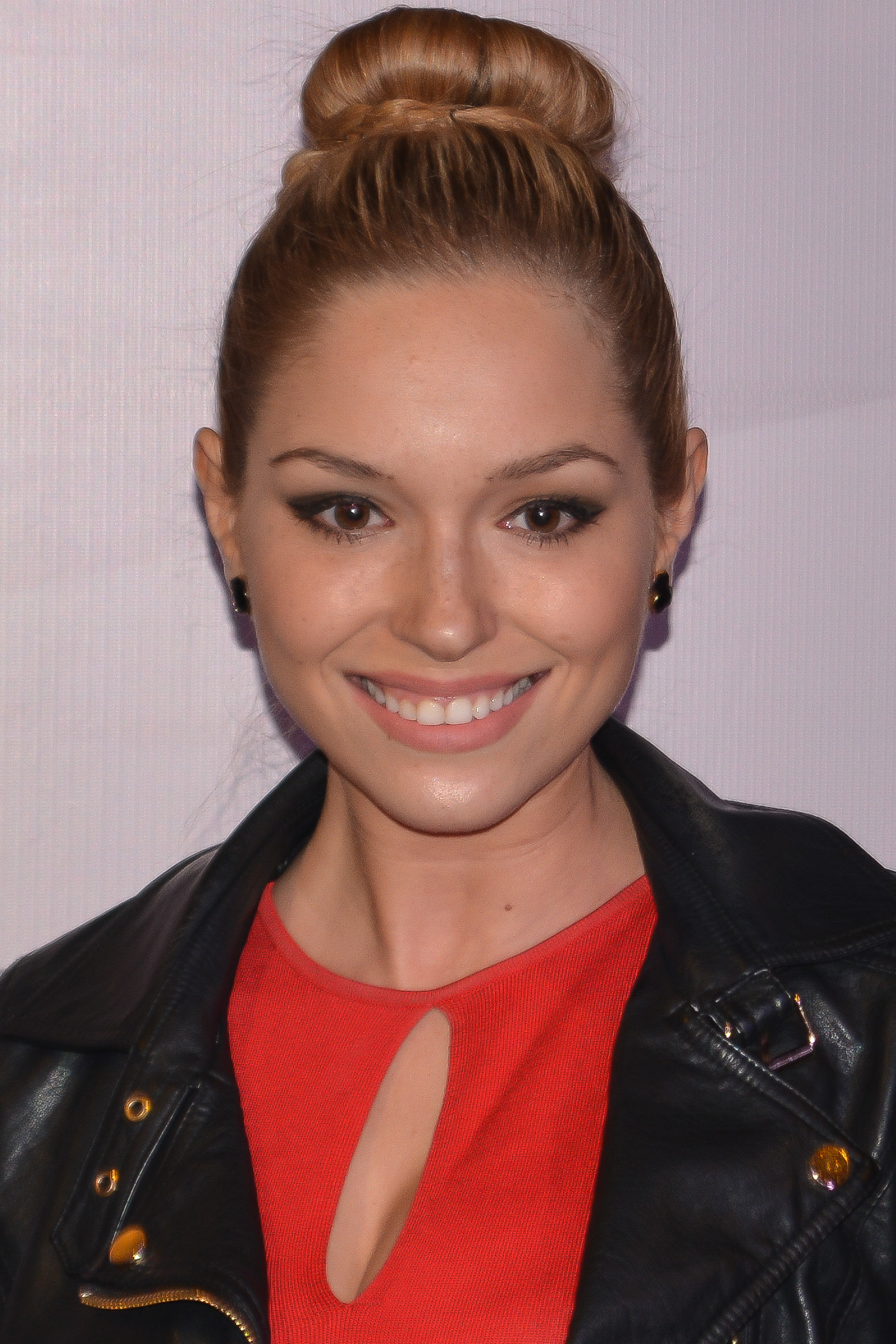
- Block in 2017
- Born: Nicole Alejandra Urzúa Avilés; July 30, 1989 (age 37); Chile
- Other name: Nicole Block Davis
- Occupations: Pornographic actress; model; producer; director
- Years active: 2024–present (pornography); 2016–2023 (mainstream)
- Spouse: Juan Cristóbal Meza (m. 2018; sep. 2021)

Nicole Alejandra Urzúa Avilés (born July 30, 1989), better known as Nicole Block, is a Chilean pornographic actress, model, producer, and former mainstream actress. She began her career as an actress in Chilean soap operas, and in 2024 she transitioned to the adult entertainment industry. In 2025, she began acting in pornographic series with her erotic content production company BlockHot.

== Career ==
=== 2016–2023: TV roles and reality competition shows ===
Block debuted as an actress in 2016 with the telenovela El camionero (2016–2017), produced and aired by the public television network TVN. In 2017, she joined the cast of the telenovela Tranquilo papá (2017–2018), created by Chilean actor and screenwriter Rodrigo Bastidas, where she plays Fernanda Aldunate as her first major television role. In 2023, Block participated in the reality competition show Tierra brava, and was eliminated after losing a tough test against one of the participants.

=== 2024–present: Transition to adult entertainment ===
In March 2024, Block joined adult content subscription service Arsmate, and she became one of the most influential content creators on the platform in a short time. Many of her followers sparked controversy after she announced through her social media that she had joined the platform. Block stated that she created an account as a result of a financial need and independence. She also decided to create her erotic content production company to focus outside of her signature thematic content, and in which she would do explicit collaborations with prominent adult content creators, dispensing with returning to soap operas. Block also joined the OnlyFans platform.

== Personal life ==
Block married Chilean musician Juan Cristóbal Meza on May 5, 2018. At the end of January 2021, Block revealed that she had ended her relationship with Juan Cristóbal Meza. However, the couple wanted to give themselves a second chance, and resumed their relationship by moving back in together and undergoing therapy. But the relationship did not thrive and they ended up separating at the end of 2021.

== Filmography ==
Television roles
Year	Title	Role	Notes
2016–2017	El camionero	Noemí Cárdenas	
2017–2018	Tranquilo papá	Fernanda Aldunate	
2023	Tierra brava	Herself	Reality competition show

Filmmaking credits
Year	Title	Functioned as	Notes
2020	Jailbreak Pact	Producer	Music department

== Awards and nominations ==
Year	Award	Category	Result
2025	Arsmate Awards	Best content creator	Won
