= El Mariachi (2014 TV series) =

- Genre: Crime thriller
- Created by: Lina Uribe; Darío Vanegas
- Based on: El Mariachi by Robert Rodriguez
- Story by: Robert Rodriguez
- Directed by: Chava Cartas; Mauricio Cruz
- Starring: Iván Arana; Martha Higareda
- Countries of origin: Colombia; United States
- Original language: Spanish
- No. of seasons: 1
- No. of episodes: 71

Production
- Executive producers: Daniel Ucros; Juan Pablo Posada; Gabriela Valentán
- Cinematography: Luis Ávila; Patricio López
- Camera setup: Multi-camera
- Production companies: Teleset Colombia; Rodriguez International Pictures; Sony Pictures Television

Original release
- Network: AXN
- Release: March 10, 2014

El Mariachi is a 2014 Spanish-language crime drama television series created by Darío Vanegas and Lina Uribe based on the 1993 American film of the same name directed by Robert Rodriguez. It is a production between Teleset Colombia and Sony Pictures Television recorded in Mexico. The series stars Iván Arana and Martha Higareda as main characters.

== Plot ==
The series revolves around of Martín (Iván Arana), a young man who is imprisoned by mistake. There, Martin will initiate an honest friendship with two inmates to face the dangers of prison, save his life and regain his freedom. In the midst of this chaos, Martín knows the love of his life, Celeste (Martha Higareda), who will believe him guilty of having committed a murder. Martín will fight to unmask those who made him go to prison and to recover his honor and the woman he loves.

== Cast ==
- Iván Arana as Martín Aguirre
- Martha Higareda as Celeste Sandoval
- Julio Bracho as Fernando Sandoval
- Gustavo Sánchez Parra as El Buitre
- Manuel Balbi as Víctor Cruz
- Gerardo Taracena as Mauro Tapias
- Enoc Leaño as Mario Urdaneta
