= Tranquilo papá =

- Genre: Telenovela
- Created by: Rodrigo Bastidas
- Written by: Rodrigo Bastidas; Elena Muñoz; Milena Bastidas; Hugo Castillo; Nicolás Mena
- Directed by: Claudio López de Lérida; Enrique Bravo
- Starring: Francisco Melo; Francisca Imboden; Íngrid Cruz; Fernando Godoy
- Opening theme: "Walking on Sunshine" by Katrina and the Waves
- Country of origin: Chile
- Original language: Spanish
- No. of seasons: 1
- No. of episodes: 187

Production
- Executive producer: Daniela Demicheli
- Producer: Claudia Cazenave
- Camera setup: Multi-camera
- Production company: Mega

Original release
- Network: Mega
- Release: April 10, 2017 – January 9, 2018

Related
- Un poquito tuyo

Tranquilo papá is a Chilean telenovela created by Rodrigo Bastidas, that premiered on Mega on April 10, 2017 and ended on January 9, 2018. It stars Francisco Melo, Francisca Imboden, Íngrid Cruz and Fernando Godoy.

== Plot ==
Domingo Aldunate is a successful old-fashioned businessman. He lives in a time of ostentation, therefore, Domingo has wanted to give everything to his children: cell phones, cars, trips, etc., thus satisfying all their needs. Domingo feels guilty, like many parents, for not being present at home due to his work. He does not know how to say no. Especially to his wife Pepa who always wants to look young, and therefore, has many plastic surgeries. This is how his family has become lazy and selfish. From one moment to another, Domingo decides to turn his life around to re-educate them. That is when he begins to say no, which causes a shake in the family.

== Cast ==
- Francisco Melo as Domingo Aldunate
- Francisca Imboden as María Josefa "Pepa" Vial
- Íngrid Cruz as Pamela Morales
- Fernando Godoy as Elvis Poblete
- Montserrat Ballarin as Cinthia Morales
- Augusto Schuster as Santiago "Santi" Aldunate
- Paula Luchsinger as Madonna Poblete
- Jaime Vadell as Agustín "Cucho" Vial
- Maricarmen Arrigorriaga as Olga Poblete
- Fernando Farías as Alberto "Don Tito" Morales
- Nicolás Saavedra as Arturo Torres
- Dayana Amigo as Soledad Aldunate
- Juan David Gálvez as Willson Lucas Fuentes
- Rodrigo Muñoz as Juan Carlos Gacitúa
- Francisco Puelles as Cristóbal Anguita
- Nicole Block as Fernanda "Fe" Aldunate
- Francisco Reyes Cristi as Raimundo "Rai" Aldunate
- Karla Melo as Natalia Flores
- Steffi Mendez as Martina Acuña
- Daniel Contesse as Bill "Gringo" Seymour
- Andres Pozo as Leandro "El Crespo" Poblete
- Cristián Gajardo as El Chino
- Pedro Campos as Pablo García
- Francisca Walker as Antonia Goycolea
- Tomás Vidiella as Leopoldo Sánchez
- María José Necochea as Marisol Cruz
- Andrea Munizaga as Lourdes
- Pelusa Troncoso as Fabiola
- Cristián Alamos as Leonel "Leo" Sepúlveda
- Sofía González as Sofía Gacitúa
- Carlos Niño as Gaspar Gacitúa
- Eduardo Niño as Benito Gacitúa
- Oscar Castro Aguirre as Sergio
- Andrea Zuckermann as Teresa
- Ángeles Valdés as Tatiana
- Yamila Reyna as Luciana de la Oz
- Sebastián Layseca as Fabio
- Nathalia Aragonese as Romina Soto
- Magdalena Müller as Laura Martínez
- Giordano Rossi as Matías Fischer

== Ratings ==
Season	Episodes	First aired		Last aired		Average
Season	Episodes	Date	Rating	Date	Rating	Average
1	187	April 10, 2017	27.9	January 9, 2018	18.3	16.8
