= Como te ves me vi =

- Directed by: Germán Quintero
- Cinematography: Perla María Gutiérrez
- Music by: Chuy Chávez
- Release date: 17 February 2017 (Mexico)
- Country: Mexico
- Language: Spanish

Como te ves me vi is a 2017 Mexican drama film directed by Germán Quintero. The film is based on the 2001 book entitled Como te ves, me vi: una historia que podría ser la tuya of Quintero. The plot revolves around a teenager misunderstood by his parents and confused in the love he learns to make decisions while living to the limit. The film premiered on 17 February 2017 in Mexico, and is stars Solkin Ruz, Cristina Rodlo, Rocío Verdejo, and Juan Ríos.

== Cast ==
- Solkin Ruz as Beto
- Cristina Rodlo as Karla Quiñones
- Rocío Verdejo as Diana Quiñones
- Juan Ríos as Gerardo Quiñones
- Carlos Aragón as Artemio
- Juan Pablo Blanco as Lázaro
- Mauro Sánchez Navarro as Marco
- Karen Sandoval as Miriam
- Gustavo Sánchez Parra as Humberto
