= Iván Arana =

Mexican actor

- Born: Luis Iván Arana Zúñiga; June 21, 1987 (age 39); Guadalajara, Jalisco, Mexico
- Other name: Iván Arana Zuñiga
- Occupation: Actor
- Years active: 2006—present

Luis Iván Arana Zúñiga (born June 21, 1987 in Guadalajara, Jalisco, Mexico) is a Mexican actor (Television and film).

== Filmography ==
=== Film roles ===
Year	Title	Roles	Notes
2009	Oveja negra	Jerónimo	
2009	Bajo tierra	Nico	Short film
2011	Ladies Mafia	Vampi	
2013	Tlatelolco, verano del 68		
2013	Polos	Leonardo	
2014	Dame tus ojos	Pedro	
2014	Cantinflas	Pedro Srmedariz	
2014	Happy Times	Rigo	
2014	Me quedo contigo	El Vaquero	
2014	Tekuani, the Guardian	Adolfo	
2014	Princesas de cartón	Paco	
2020	Cuidado con lo que deseas	Esteban	

=== Television roles ===
Year	Title	Roles	Notes
2010–2012	Soy tu fan	Emilio Cruz	Recurring role (seasons 1–2); 20 episodes
2014	El Mariachi	Martín Aguirre	Main role; 70 episodes
2014	El Chivo	Lázaro Conde	Main role; 70 episodes
2016	La querida del Centauro	Sergio Gómez "El Perro"	Recurring role (season 1); 3 episodes
2016–2024	El Señor de los Cielos	Ismael Casillas Guerra	Recurring role (seasons 4–5), main role (seasons 6–9)
2019	La Bandida	Pedro Núñez	Main role
2020–2021	Imperio de mentiras	Darío Ramírez	Main role
2022	El último rey	Vicente Fernández Jr.	Main role
2022	'Til Jail Do Us Part	Miguel	Main role
2023	Nadie como tú	Jonás Madrigal Arreola	Main role
2025	La Jefa	Eduardo Torres	Lead role
2025	Amanecer	Aldo Bocanegra	Guest star
