= Cuidado con lo que deseas =

- Theatrical poster
- Directed by: Agustín Tapia
- Written by: Agustín Tapia
- Produced by: Leonardo Zimbron; Agustín "Oso" Tapia; Diego Gallangos
- Starring: Fernanda Castillo; Iván Arana; Juan Rios; Valery Sais
- Cinematography: Javier Morón
- Edited by: Raul Kintaing
- Music by: Daniel Hidalgo
- Distributed by: Cinepólis Distribución
- Release dates: April 20, 2020 (Morelia Film Festival); August 20, 2020 (Mexico)
- Running time: 91 minutes
- Country: Mexico
- Language: Spanish

Cuidado con lo que deseas (lit. 'Be careful what you wish for') is a 2020 Mexican horror thriller film written and directed by Agustín Tapia. It was produced by Leonardo Zimbron, Agustin Tapia, and Diego Gallangos. It follows the story of a family on a weekend vacation to celebrate their daughter's eighth birthday. When she receives a jester doll as a gift, it exposes their darkest secret desires.

It was a box-office success in Mexico, but critics found fault with its plot and "confusing" writing.

== Plot ==
Pamela, a seven-year-old girl and horror film fan, is taken by her parents, Nuria and Bernardo, to her family's cabin in the woods to celebrate her eighth birthday. Her paternal uncle, Esteban, joins them as well. Once there, Pam finds Esteban's gift: a jester puppet doll named Hellequin, who, according to her uncle, is based on a real jester who was hanged when he failed to amuse his king.

That night, Nuria and Esteban who are having a secret affair, meet at the shack's shed and have sex. They plot against Bernardo; Esteban plans to kill his brother but make it look like an accident. Meanwhile, Pam is awakened by Hellequin, who uses puppets to reveal her uncle and mother's secret affair, and their plan to kill her father. Pam tries to warn her family of the situation, but Hellequin stops her claiming that if she does, he will take their souls to hell.

Following Nuria and Esteban's plan, the family throws a private party for Pam. Pam tries to warn her family with a puppet play of a king betrayed by his wife, and sings songs to both Bernardo and Esteban with clues of the hideous plans. Hellequin reveals to Pam that her parents are actually pretending to be on Esteban's side, and instead they have their own plan to kill Esteban in the toolshed. As Esteban begins to worry about his plan's success, he discovers in a book that a part of Hellequin's background might be true, where it is revealed that his soul was trapped inside the doll by a wizard.

On the last day of the weekend, Esteban and Bernardo get ready to kill each other. Esteban apparently kills his brother Bernardo by hitting him in the head with a pole. However, when he and Nuria go to the shed, they are ambushed by Bernardo, who had protected himself with a hidden helmet. Bernardo tries to kill Esteban with a shotgun, but his attempt backfires as Nuria disassembles the munitions, forcing both brothers to confront each other with an axe and a rake in a violent battle. Bernardo finally kills Esteban with a rake. Bernardo tries to kill Nuria as well and chases her through the woods, but he is instead killed by his wife when he falls into a bear trap and is beaten to death with the shotgun. Pam learns everything thanks to Hellequin, who again uses puppets to show her what has happened.

Days later, Nuria inherits her husband's and brother-in-law's family business, as planned. In revenge, Pam kills Nuria, by making her fall from the stairs.

== Cast ==
- Iván Arana
- Fernanda Castillo
- Juan Ríos

== Production ==
=== Writing ===
The film was written and directed by Agustín Tapia who was inspired by Agatha Christie stories, Alfred Hitchcock films, and The Twilight Zone episodes. Tapia wrote the film as a mystery drama with influences of fantasy and psychological manipulation in order to make the audience believe any character could be the villain, and wonder whether the doll is alive.

=== Filming ===
The principal photography took place in Valle de Bravo and Ajusco. Filming concluded in early 2020 as the original premiere date was April 2020, but the premiere was delayed due to the COVID-19 pandemic.

== Reception ==
=== Box office ===
The film premiered in Mexico on August 20, 2020, and it was the third most successful film during its opening weekend. It was one of the first films shown during theater reopenings after the first wave of the pandemic in Mexico. It grossed a total of 438,728 pesos for its domestic box office and worldwide.

The film was eventually distributed by Netflix in December 2020 and became one of the most watched films that month.

=== Critics ===
The film was met with mostly mixed to negative reviews.

Jose Roberto Landaverde from CinePremiere gave it 3.5 stars out of 5, calling the film a waste of creative obsessions that nonetheless kept the best of every genre it explores, writing: "From terror to thriller going through true crime; this is a fresh take".

Conversely, Javier Quintanar Polanco from Tomatazos graded it as "disappointing", specifically for its plot and narrative commenting: "It persists in proposing an ambiguous moral judgment about the consequences of our negative actions that also fails to bear fruit, and is reduced to a hollow and pedestrian discourse."
