= Juan Ríos (actor) =

Juan Ríos Cantú
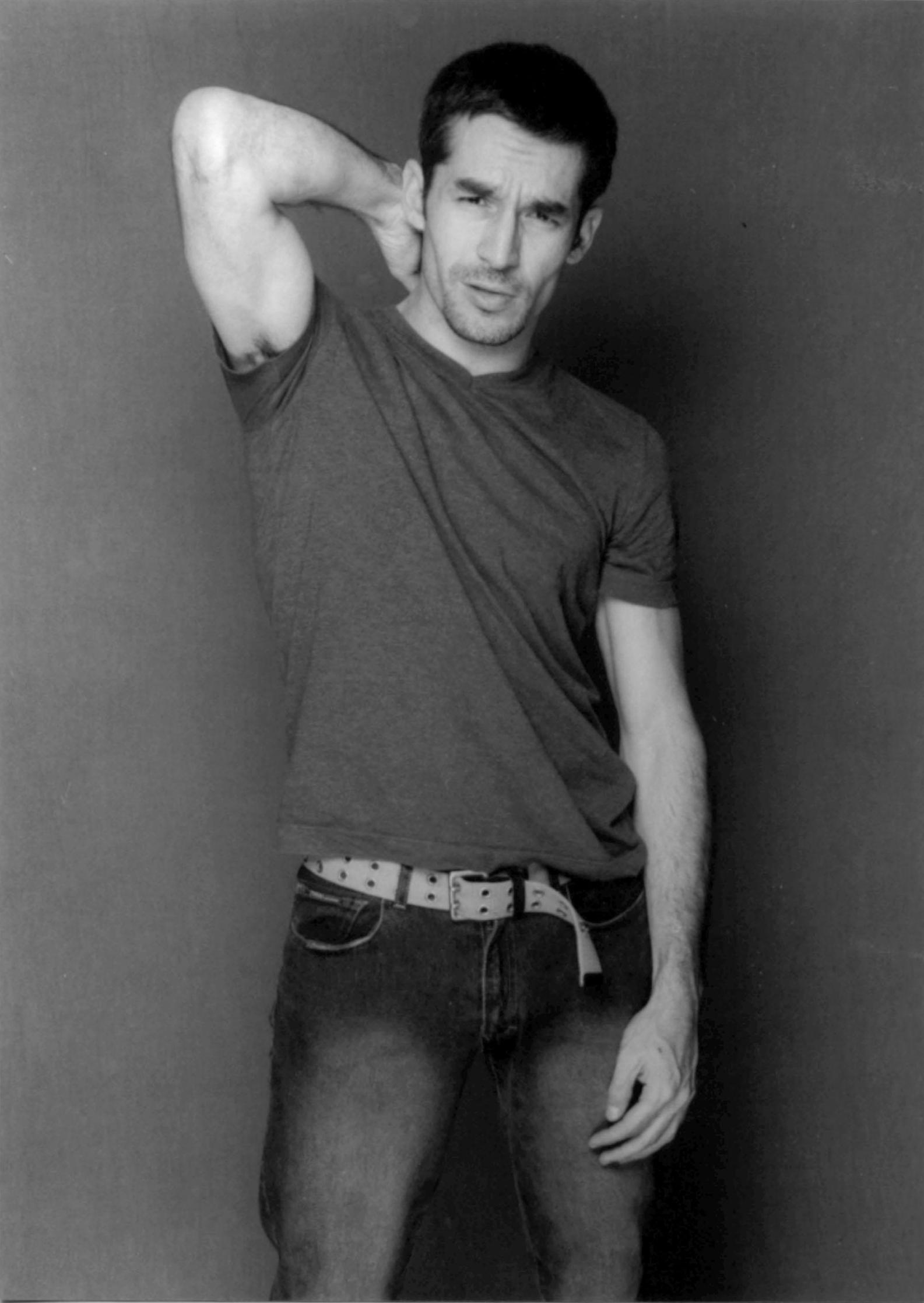
- Born: 13 November 1974 (age 50); Reynosa, Tamaulipas, Mexico
- Other names: Juan Ríos Cantú
- Years active: 1981–present

Juan Ríos Cantú (born 13 November 1974 in Reynosa, Tamaulipas), is a Mexican television actor.

== Filmography ==
=== Films ===
Year	Title	Role	Notes
1981	Zoot Suit	Crow	
2002	Francisca	Unknown role	
2002	El tigre de Santa Julia	Pedro Luna	
2003	Tú mataste a Tarantino	Unknown role	Short film
2004	Puerto Vallarta Squeeze	Inspector	
2005	La noche de siempre	Alfredo	Short film
2005	Bitácora	Unknown role	Short film
2006	Cansada de besar sapos	Asistente Roberto	
2006	Sea of Dreams	Cristobal	
2006	Así del precipicio	Ramiro	
2007	Párpados azules	Párpados Azules, él	
2007	El resultado del amor	Don Río	
2007	Niña que espera	Unknown role	Short film
2007	Todos los días son tuyos	Gallego	
2008	El vengador	Unknown role	Short film
2009	Gravedad	Padre	Short film
2010	No eres tú, soy yo	Martín	
2011	La otra familia	Agustín	
2011	Días de gracia	Ramiro	
2013	El otro Cochiloco	Gerardo Medina	
2015	Solitude	Marc	Short film
2016	Rumbos paralelos	Lic. Huerta	
2017	Como te ves me vi	Gerardo Quiñones	
2020	Cuidado con lo que deseas	Bernardo	

=== Television roles ===
Year	Title	Roles	Notes
1997	Esmeralda	Claudio	
1999	Tres mujeres	El Carita	
1999	Cuentos para solitarios	Richu	Episode: "La mano"
2000	Ramona	El Norteño	
2000	El derecho de nacer	Raúl de la Reguera	
2001–2005	Mujer, casos de la vida real	Various roles	5 episodes
2003	Ladrón de corazones	Emilio Escobar	
2007	Lola, érase una vez	Eduardo	
2008	Mujeres asesinas	Pablo	Episode: "Martha, asfixiante"
2009	Tiempo final	Bernardo	Episode: "El hijo perfecto"
2010–2011	Para volver a amar	Faber Esparza	Series regular; 143 episodes
2012	Infames	Ignacio Cabello	
2013	Gossip Girl: Acapulco	Gerardo Fuenmayor	Episode: "12 uvas"
2013	Las trampas del deseo	Álvaro Luján	
2013	El Señor de los Cielos	General Daniel Jiménez Arroyo "El Letrudo"	Recurring role (season 1); 61 episodes
2015	Amor de barrio	Saúl	2 episodes
2016	Hasta que te conocí	David Bencomo	3 episodes
2016–2017	La Doña	Rafael Cabral	Series regular (season 1); 106 episodes
2017	El Chema	General Daniel Jiménez Arroyo "El Letrudo"	Recurring role (season 1); 11 episodes
2017	Nada personal	Salvador Suárez	
2017	Club de Cuervos	Director comercial	Episode: "Church and State"
2017	3 familias	César Guerra	
2019	Cuna de lobos	Omar Vega	Recurring role; 25 episodes
