= El Chivo =

- Genre: Telenovela
- Created by: Humberto "Kiko" Olivieri
- Based on: The Feast of the Goat by Mario Vargas Llosa
- Story by: Mario Vargas Llosa
- Directed by: Andrés Biermann; Rolando Ocampo; Alfonso Pineda Ulloa
- Creative director: Gabriela Monroy
- Starring: Julio Bracho; Eileen Moreno; Iván Arana; Diana Hoyos
- Music by: Oliver Camargo; José Carlos María
- Original language: Spanish
- No. of seasons: 1
- No. of episodes: 70

Production
- Executive producer: Madeleine Contreras
- Cinematography: Hobardo Chicangana; Ciro Alexander Nuñez; Roberto Cortés
- Editors: Alba Merchan Hamann; CJosé Luis Varón
- Camera setup: Multi-camera
- Production companies: RTI Producciones; Televisa

Original release
- Network: UniMás
- Release: September 23 – December 31, 2014

El Chivo is a telenovela produced by RTI Producciones and Televisa for United States–based television network Univisión and for Colombia-based television network Caracol Television. It is an adaptation of the book La fiesta del Chivo (The Feast of the Goat) from Mario Vargas Llosa based on the history of Dominican Dictator, Rafael Trujillo. The telenovela began filming in May 2014.

== Plot ==
Rafael Leónidas Trujillo is a cattle thief. In a confusing event, he meets Mariana Durán, his current wife, who saved him from death. Some time later, Rafael enters the army and forges a career of several years that leads him to the rank of general. From this position, he forges a coup against the dictator at the time, Eusebio Porras. After an interim period in the governing military junta, Trujillo took power after a suspicious Dominican election that had him winning over a lot of opponents (students and guerrillas).

== Cast ==
Actor	Character
Julio Bracho	Rafael Leónidas Trujillo
Eileen Moreno	Mariana Durán
Diana Hoyos	Ángela Durán
Manuela González	Susana
Iván Arana	Lázaro Conde
Javier Delgiudice	Arístides Guerrero
Juan Sebastián Calero	Jhonny
Julio Sánchez Cóccaro	Agustín Cabral
Cristina García	Urania Cabral
Leonardo Acosta	Domenech
Laura Ramos	Rosita
Camilo Sáenz	Padre Guzmán
Lina Tejeiro	Celia
Catherine French	Xiomara De Trujillo
