= Malillany Marín =

Cuban-Mexican actress and model (born 1980)

- Born: Malillany Marín; December 23, 1980 (age 45); Havana, Cuba
- Occupations: Actress; model
- Years active: 2004-present

Malillany Marín (born Malillany Marín Rodríguez; December 23, 1980 in Havana, Cuba) is a Cuban-Mexican actress and model.

== Filmography ==
Film performances
Year	Title	Roles	Notes
2014	Volando Bajo	Estrellita Martinez	
2023	Hombres hay muchos	Raquel	

Television performances
Year	Title	Roles	Notes
2004-06	Rebelde	Luz Viviana Olivier	Supporting role
2005-06	Peregrina	Argelia	Supporting role
2006-07	La Fea Más Bella	Dora	Guest star
2007	Destilando Amor	Albertina	Guest star
2007-08	Tormenta en el paraíso	Fabiola Sarmiento	Supporting role
2007-10	El NotiFiero	Caridad Cienfuegos	
2008	Querida Enemiga	Vanessa	Supporting role
2008-09	Un gancho al corazón	Anastasia	Guest star
2009-10	Hasta Que el Dinero Nos Separe	Claudia Bermúdez de Urdiales	Supporting role
2011-12	Dos Hogares	Jennifer Garza Larrazabal	
2012-18	Como dice el dicho	Cristina Lucía Paola	Episode: "Piensa el ladrón..." Episode: "El que limpio juega, limpio se queda" Episode: "A quien más se resiste, con más fuerza el amor embiste"
2012-13	Qué Bonito Amor	Elvira Hernández	Main role
2013	Mira Quien Baila	Herself	Finished 6th place
2014	Estrella2	Herself	
2015–16	Hoy	Herself/co-hostess	
2015	Divorciémonos mi amor		Theatrical performance
2016	Nosotros los guapos	Rosita	Main role (season 1)
2018	José José, el príncipe de la canción	Sara Salazar	
2019-23	Esta historia me suena	Anaís Teresa Ofelia	Episode: "Despacito" Episode: "Bella señora" Episode: "Mala hierba"
2021	Dr. Cándido Pérez	Gloria	Episode: "La evaluación"
2024	Vivir de amor	Jimena Díaz	

== Awards and nominations ==
=== Premios TVyNovelas ===
Year	Category	Telenovela	Result
2010	Best Female Revelation	Hasta Que el Dinero Nos Separe	Nominated

=== Premios Bravo ===
Year	Category	Telenovela	Result
2010	Best Female Revelation	Hasta Que el Dinero Nos Separe	Won
