= Claudia Troyo =

Mexican actress

- Born: June 20, 1977 (age 47); Maravatío, Michoacán, Mexico
- Occupation: Actress
- Years active: 1998–present
- Height: 1.65 m (5 ft 5 in)

Claudia Troyo (born June 20, 1977) is a Mexican actress known for her work in soap operas produced by Emilio Larrosa: Amigas y rivales, Las vías del amor, and Hasta que el dinero nos separe. Troyo started her career as an actress with the soap opera La Mentira (The Lie) which was produced by Carlos Sotomayor.

When the producer Emilio Larrosa saw the way she worked he thought she had talent and would achieve many things as a Mexican actress, so he asked her if she could work for him and told her that she would have many opportunities as a famous actress. She accepted and started with him with the soap opera Mujeres engañadas (Deceived Women), and then a year later she worked on Amigas y rivales (Friends and Rivals). In Hasta que el dinero nos separe, she plays Susana Hadad, a very spiritual vegetarian, who is the main character's secretary and best friend.

== Filmography ==
Television
| Year | Title | Role | Notes |
|---|---|---|---|
| 1998 | Soñadoras | Ruben's Friend | 1 episode |
| 1998 | La mentira | Irazema | |
| 1998 | Camila | Secretary | |
| 1999–2000 | Mujeres engañadas | Carolina Susana Montero | |
| 2001–2007 | Mujer, casos de la vida real | Various roles | 15 episodes |
| 2001 | Amigas y rivales | Mónica Oviedo | |
| 2002–2003 | Las vías del amor | Claudia Jiménez | 220 episodes |
| 2004 | Corazones al límite | Coral | 7 episodes |
| 2004–2005 | Mujer de madera | Deborah "Deby" San Román | 138 episodes |
| 2005 | Piel de otoño | Carmina | 13 episodes |
| 2006 | La verdad oculta | Julieta Guillén | 120 episodes |
| 2007 | Muchachitas como tú | Lucy Montenegro | 143 episodes |
| 2008–2019 | La rosa de Guadalupe | Various roles | 9 episodes |
| 2009 | Mañana es para siempre | Adriana Bravo | 2 episodes |
| 2009–2010 | Hasta que el dinero nos separe | Susana Hadad | 230 episodes |
| 2010 | Mujeres asesinas | Luzma | Episode: "Azucena, Liberada" |
| 2011 | El Equipo | Ana | 2 episodes |
| 2012–2018 | Como dice el dicho | Various roles | 8 episodes |
| 2012 | Una familia con suerte | Minerva Sandoval | 3 episodes |
| 2013 | Libre para amarte | Olivia Garza | 106 episodes |
| 2015–2016 | Simplemente María | Estela Lozano | 122 episodes |
| 2017 | Nosotros los guapos | Ximena | Episode: "Ya bailaron" |
| 2018 | Por amar sin ley | Marcela Quiroz de Pérez | 1 episode |
| 2018 | Tenías que ser tú | Eliana Landino | 5 episodes |
| 2018 | La bella y las bestias | Andrea | 8 episodes |
| 2019 | Silvia Pinal, frente a ti | Ariadna Welter | 4 episodes |
| 2020–2021 | Quererlo todo | Luisa Zermeño | 6 episodes |
| 2022 | Esta historia me suena | Lucía | Episode: "Dos mujeres, un camino" |
| 2023 | Nadie como tú | Martha | |
| 2025 | A.mar, donde el amor teje sus redes | Teresita | |
