= Horacio Beamonte =

Mexican actor and singer

- Born: Horacio Alfonso Beamonte Ortiz; February 4, 1977 (age 49); Mexico City, Mexico
- Occupations: Actor, Singer

Horacio Alfonso Beamonte Ortiz (born 4 February 1977), is a Mexican actor, singer, songwriter, and Christian Pastor. Across his career, he has appeared in over 40 telenovelas, 20 television series, and several anthology programmes.

== Early life ==
Beaumonte was born in Mexico City, Mexico, on 4 February 1977. He was raised primarily by his maternal grandmother, mother (Lucero Campos), and his sister. His mother, Lucero Campos, is a singer and actress.

== Career ==
Beaumonte has been in several Mexican TV shows including Amigos x Siempre, El Pantera (2007), and El amor invencible (2023).

== Personal Life & Health ==
Beaumonte was diagnosed with Philadelphia chromosome-positive acute lymphoblastic, an aggressive blood cancer, on 9 April 2025. By February 2026, the leukaemia had spread to his central nervous system, causing seizures and blindness in his left eye.
