= 35th TVyNovelas Awards =

2017 Mexican TV awards

- Date: March 26, 2017
- Location: Mexico City, Mexico
- Hosted by: Maite Perroni & Cristián de la Fuente

Highlights
- Most awards: La candidata (8)
- Most nominations: La candidata (20)

Television/radio coverage
- Network: Las Estrellas

The 35th TVyNovelas Awards were an academy of special awards to the best soap operas and TV shows. The awards ceremony took place on March 26, 2017. The ceremony was televised in Mexico by Las Estrellas and in the United States by Univision.

Maite Perroni and Cristián de la Fuente hosted the show for the first time. La candidata won 8 awards, the most for the evening including Best Telenovela. Other winners Vino el amor won 4 awards, Tres veces Ana won 3 awards, El hotel de los secretos and Sueño de amor won 2 awards each and Las amazonas won 1 award.

== Summary of awards and nominations ==
Telenovela	Nominations	Awards
La candidata	20	8
El hotel de los secretos	17	2
Sin rastro de ti	13	0
Tres veces Ana	11	3
Vino el amor	9	4
Corazón que miente	9	0
Sueño de amor	6	2
Las amazonas	6	1
Un camino hacia el destino	6	0
Despertar contigo	2	0
Simplemente María	2	0

== Winners and nominees ==
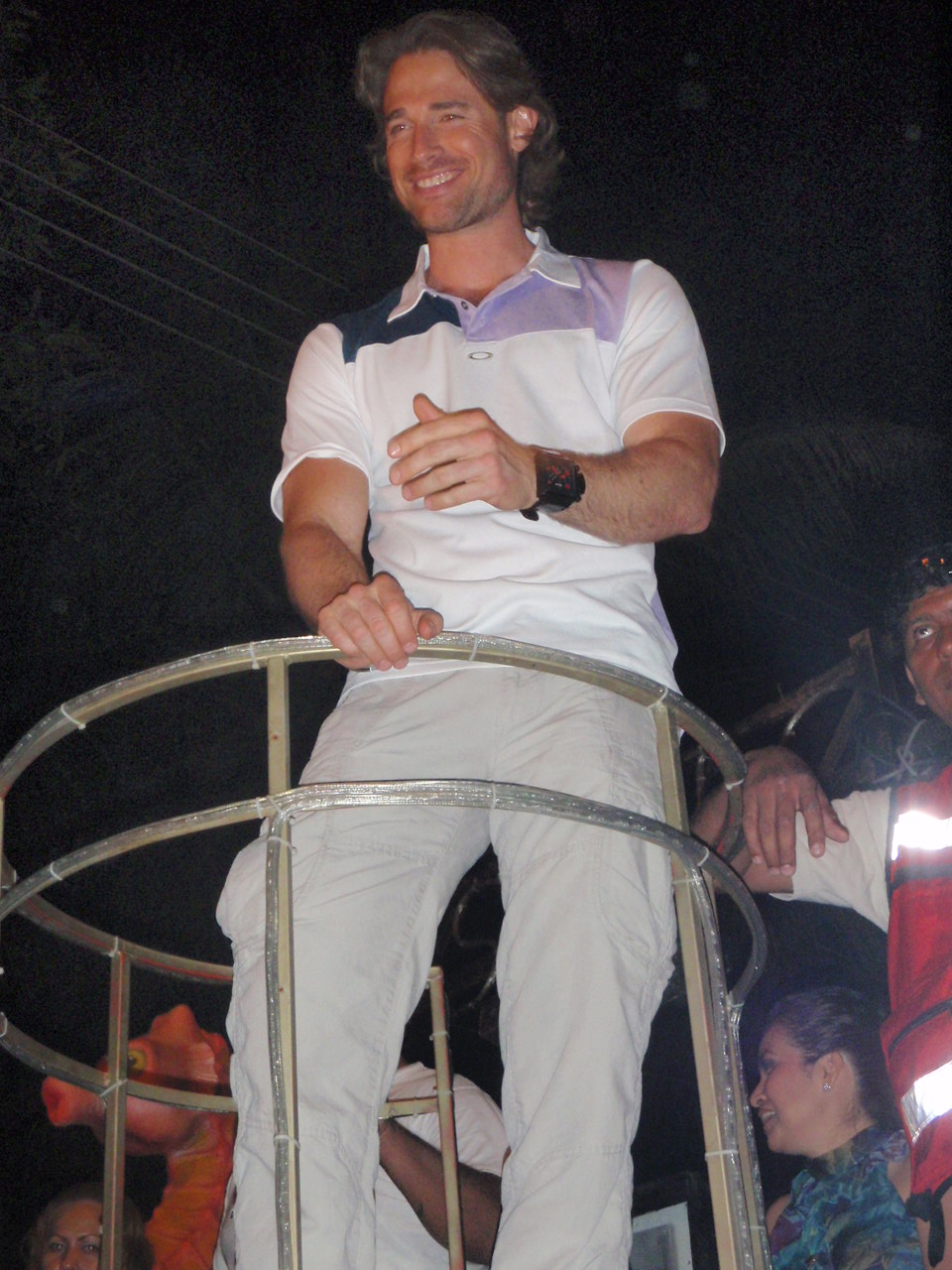
Sebastián Rulli, winner for Best Actor

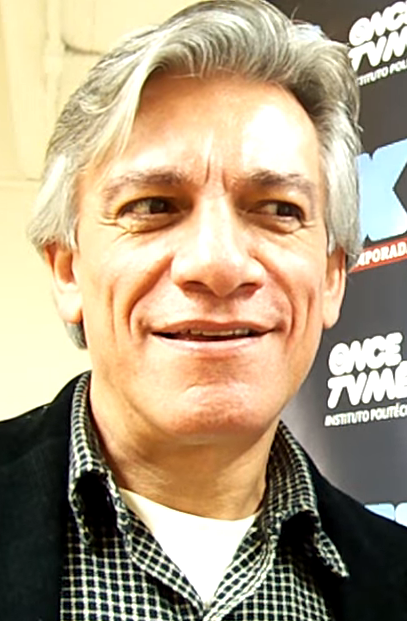
Juan Carlos Barreto, winner for Best Antagonist Actor

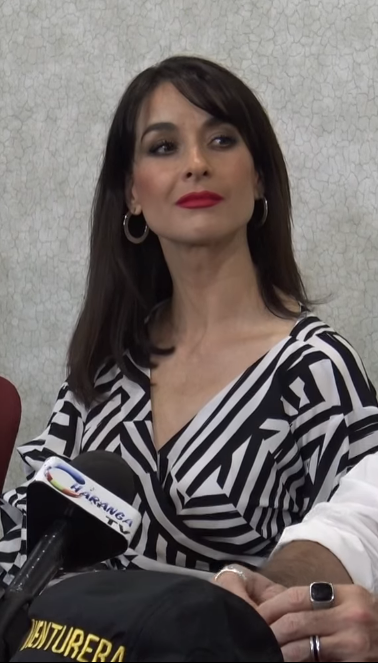
Susana González, winner for Best Co-lead Actress

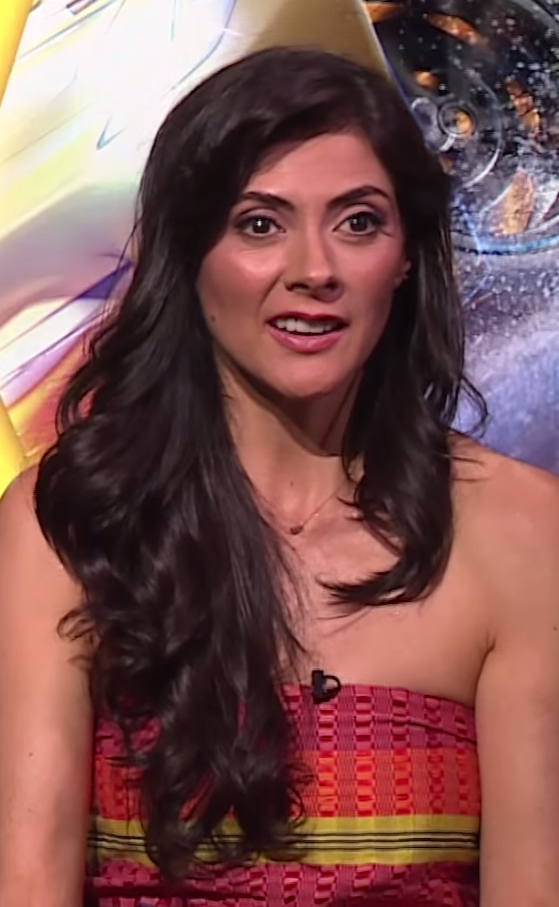
Verónica Jaspeado winner for Best Supporting Actress

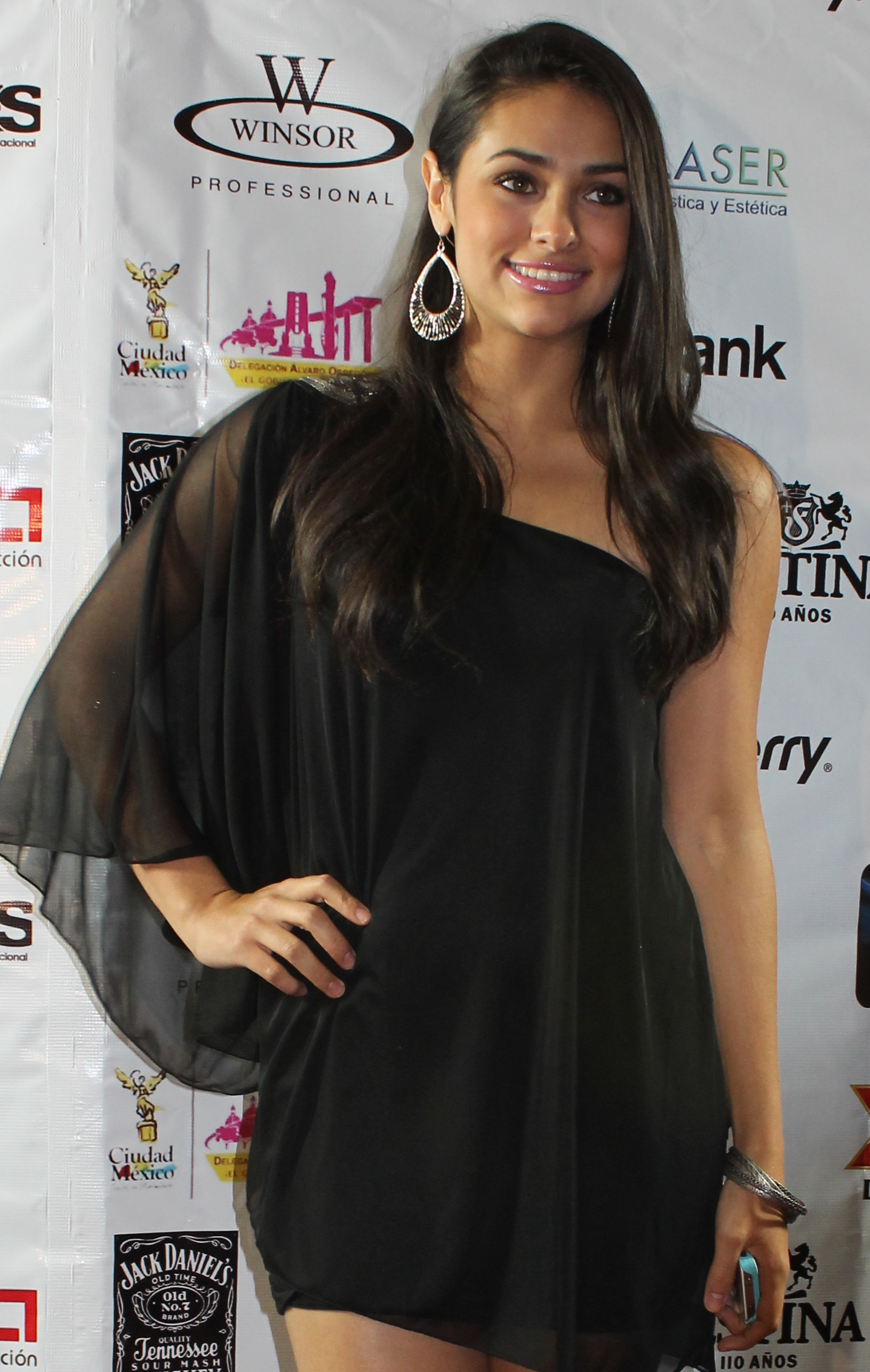
Renata Notni, winner for Best Young Lead Actress

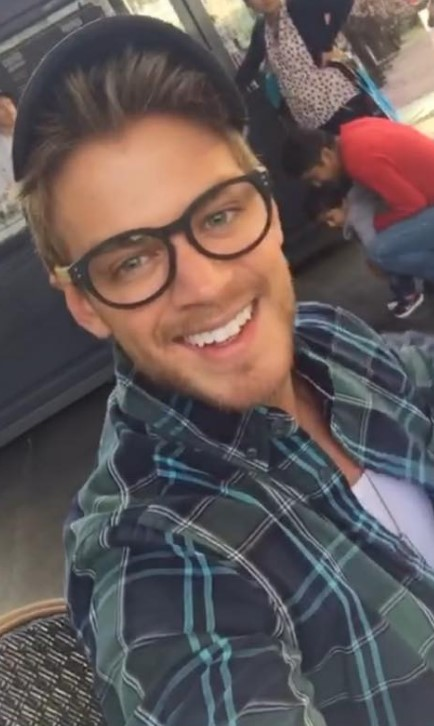
Polo Morín winner for Best Young Lead Actor

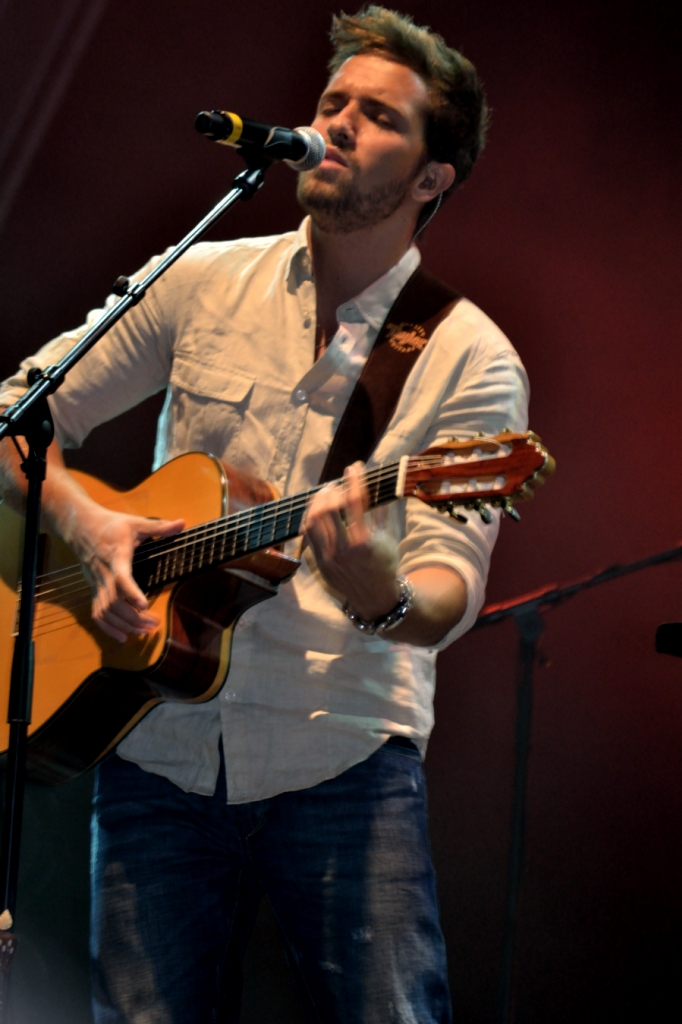
Pablo Alborán, winner for Best Musical Theme

=== Telenovelas ===
Best Telenovela	Best Cast
La candidata; Corazón que miente; El hotel de los secretos; Sin rastro de ti; Un camino hacia el destino; Vino el amor	La candidata; Despertar contigo; El hotel de los secretos; Las amazonas; Tres veces Ana
Best Actress	Best Actor
Angelique Boyer – Tres veces Ana; Adriana Louvier – Sin rastro de ti; Claudia Álvarez – Simplemente María; Irene Azuela – El hotel de los secretos; Silvia Navarro – La candidata	Sebastián Rulli – Tres veces Ana; Andrés Palacios – Las amazonas; Erick Elías – El hotel de los secretos; Pablo Lyle – Corazón que miente; Víctor González – La candidata
Best Antagonist Actress	Best Antagonist Actor
Azela Robinson – Vino el amor; Ana Layevska – Sin rastro de ti; Diana Bracho – El hotel de los secretos; Nailea Norvind – La candidata; Sabine Moussier – Sueño de amor	Juan Carlos Barreto – La candidata; Alejandro Tommasi – Corazón que miente; Jorge Poza – El hotel de los secretos; José Elías Moreno – Sin rastro de ti; Julián Gil – Sueño de amor
Best Leading Actress	Best Leading Actor
Helena Rojo – La candidata; Blanca Guerra – Tres veces Ana; Cynthia Klitbo – Vino el amor; Daniela Romo – El hotel de los secretos; Patricia Reyes Spíndola – Un camino hacia el destino	César Évora – Las amazonas; Alexis Ayala – Corazón que miente; Eric del Castillo – Tres veces Ana; Jesús Ochoa – El hotel de los secretos; Patricio Castillo – La candidata
Best Co-lead Actress	Best Co-lead Actor
Susana González – La candidata; Eugenia Cauduro – Un camino hacia el destino; Grettell Valdéz – Las amazonas; Ilse Salas – El hotel de los secretos; Leticia Huijara – Despertar contigo	Carlos Rivera – El hotel de los secretos; Diego Olivera – Corazón que miente; Ferdinando Valencia – Simplemente María; Juan Pablo Medina – Sin rastro de ti; Rafael Sánchez Navarro – La candidata
Best Supporting Actress	Best Supporting Actor
Verónica Jaspeado – Vino el amor; Arcelia Ramírez – Un camino hacia el destino; Laisha Wilkins – Tres veces Ana; María Sorté – Corazón que miente; Pilar Mata – La candidata	Juan Vidal – Vino el amor; Ari Telch – La candidata; Eduardo España – El hotel de los secretos; Otto Sirgo – Tres veces Ana; Pablo Perroni – Sin rastro de ti
Best Young Lead Actress	Best Young Lead Actor
Renata Notni – Sueño de amor; Karla Farfán – La candidata; Mariluz Bermúdez – Las amazonas; Sachi Tamashiro – Tres veces Ana; Sofía Castro – Vino el amor	Polo Morín – Sueño de amor; Federico Ayos – La candidata; José Pablo Minor – Sin rastro de ti; Josh Gutiérrez – El hotel de los secretos; Juan Pablo Gil – Las amazonas
Best Female Revelation	Best Male Revelation
Bárbara López – Vino el amor; Alejandra Robles Gil – Sin rastro de ti; Jessica Segura – Corazón que miente; Michelle González – La candidata; Regina Blandón – El hotel de los secretos	Carlos Rivera – El hotel de los secretos; Federico Ayos – Corazón que miente; Juan Martín Jáuregui – La candidata; Juan Martín Jáuregui – Sin rastro de ti; Santiago Ramundo – Sueño de amor
Best Musical Theme	Best Original Story or Adaptation
"Se puede amar" — Pablo Alborán – Tres veces Ana; "Instrumental" — Jordi Bachbush – La candidata; "Mi camino eres tú" — Paulina Goto – Un camino hacia el destino; "Mi verdad" — Maná and Shakira – Sueño de amor; "Que lo nuestro se quede nuestro" — Carlos Rivera – Sin rastro de ti	Leonardo Bechini – La candidata; Carlos Quintanilla and Adriana Pelusi – Sin rastro de ti; Janely Lee – Vino el amor; María Antonieta "Calú" Gutiérrez – Un camino hacia el destino; María Renée Prudencio Mier – El hotel de los secretos
Best Direction	Best Direction of the Cameras
Eric Morales and Juan Pablo Blanco – La candidata; Claudio Reyes Rubio and Sergio Cataño – Tres veces Ana; Francisco Franco and Ana Lorena Pérez Ríos – El hotel de los secretos; Salvador Sánchez and Santiago Barbosa – Vino el amor; Walter Doehner and Ana Lorena Pérez Ríos – Sin rastro de ti	Armando Zafra and Luis Rodríguez – La candidata; Manuel Barajas and Armando Zafra – Tres veces Ana; Marco Vinicio, Óscar Morales and Bernardo Nájera – Corazón que miente; Vivian Sánchez Ross, Manuel Barajas and Daniel Ferrer – El hotel de los secretos; Walter Doehner and Luis Rodríguez – Sin rastro de ti

=== Others ===
Best Unit Program	Best Series
Como dice el dicho; La rosa de Guadalupe	Mujeres de negro; Blue Demon; Login; Yago
Best Actress in a Series	Best Actor in a Series
Ana Brenda Contreras – Blue Demon; Gabriela de la Garza – Yago; Laura Montijano – Login; Mayrin Villanueva – Mujeres de negro	Diego Olivera – Mujeres de negro; Alan Alarcón – Login; Iván Sánchez – Yago; Tenoch Huerta – Blue Demon
Best Comedy Program	Best Entertainment Program
Nosotros los guapos; 40 y 20; Burócatas; Doble sentido	Hoy; Cuéntamelo ya; El coque va; El juego de las estrellas; Recuerda y gana
Best Restricted TV Program
MoJoe; Es de noche... y ya llegué; Hacen y deshacen; Miembros al aire; Netas divinas

=== Univision Awards ===
The following awards were presented on the Univision broadcast that aired on April 16, 2017

Best Reality Show	Revelation as a Host
Nuestra Belleza Latina; La banda; Pequeños gigantes USA	Francisca Lachapel; Clarissa Molina; Karina Banda; Sebastián Villalobos; William Valdés

=== Special recognitions ===
- Carla Estrada for Por siempre Joan Sebastian
- 20 Year Anniversary: ¡Despierta América!

== Performers ==
Name(s)	Performed
CNCO	"Reggaetón Lento (Bailemos)"
Cristian Castro	"Tú estás aquí" during the annual In Memoriam tribute
Joey Montana	"Picky"
José Manuel Figueroa	"Tatuajes"
Juanes	"Fuego" "La camisa negra"
Kabah; Magneto; Mercurio; Sentidos Opuestos	"Únete a la fiesta"
