= 34th TVyNovelas Awards =

2016 Mexican TV awards

- Date: April 17, 2016
- Location: Acapulco, Guerrero, Mexico
- Hosted by: Marjorie de Sousa & Gabriel Soto

Highlights
- Most awards: A que no me dejas (7)
- Most nominations: Antes muerta que Lichita (19)

Television/radio coverage
- Network: Canal de las Estrellas

The 34th TVyNovelas Awards were an academy of special awards to the best soap operas and TV shows. The awards ceremony took place on April 17, 2016 in Acapulco, Guerrero. The ceremony was televised in Mexico by Canal de las Estrellas and in the United States by Univision.

Marjorie de Sousa and Gabriel Soto hosted the show for the first time. A que no me dejas won 7 awards, the most for the evening. Other winners Pasión y poder won 5 awards, including Best Telenovela, Antes muerta que Lichita and La sombra del pasado won 3 awards and La vecina, Muchacha italiana viene a casarse and Que te perdone Dios won 1 each.

== Summary of awards and nominations ==
Telenovela	Nominations	Awards
Antes muerta que Lichita	19	3
La sombra del pasado	17	3
A que no me dejas	14	7
La vecina	14	1
Pasión y poder	9	5
Muchacha italiana viene a casarse	8	1
Amor de barrio	7	0
Amores con trampa	6	0
Que te perdone Dios	5	1
Hasta el fin del mundo	3	0
Lo imperdonable	3	0

== Winners and nominees ==
=== Telenovelas ===
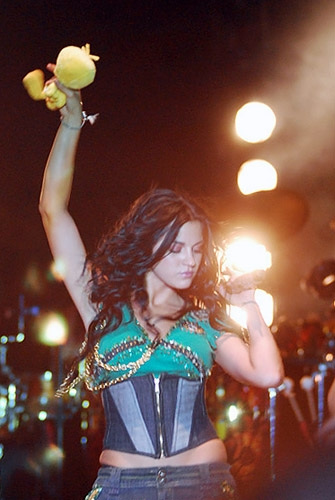
Maite Perroni, winner for Best Actress

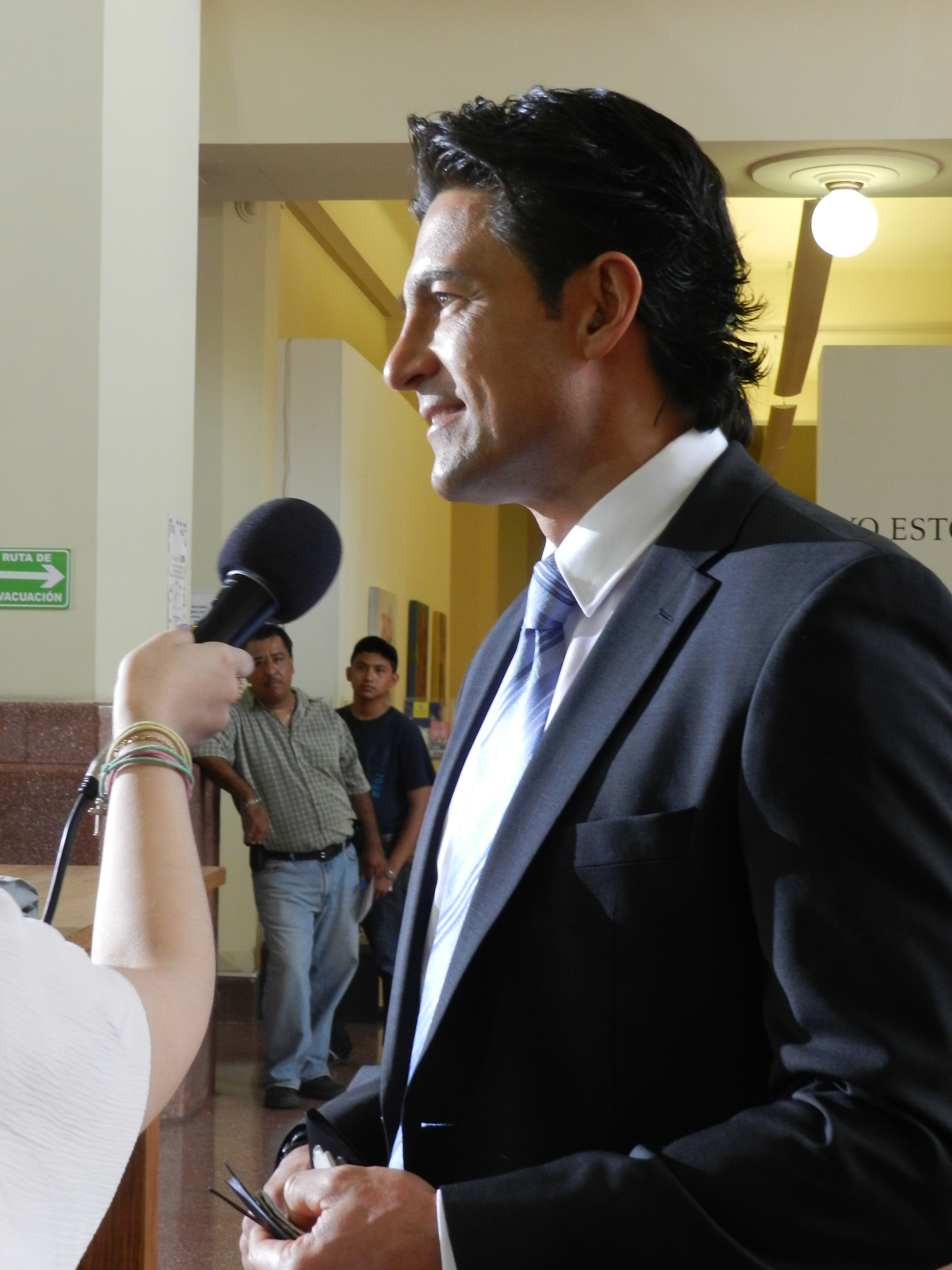
Fernando Colunga, winner for Best Antagonist Actor

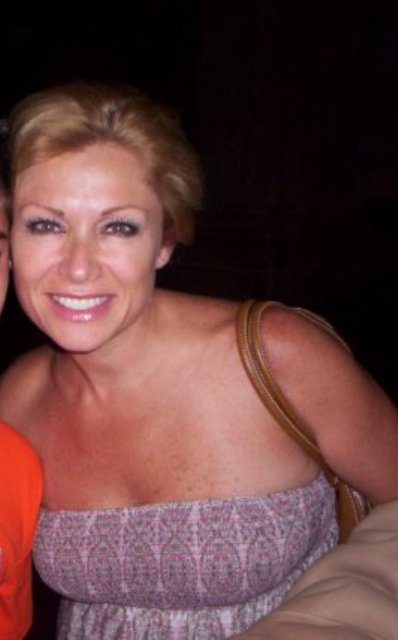
Leticia Calderón, winner for Best Leading Actress

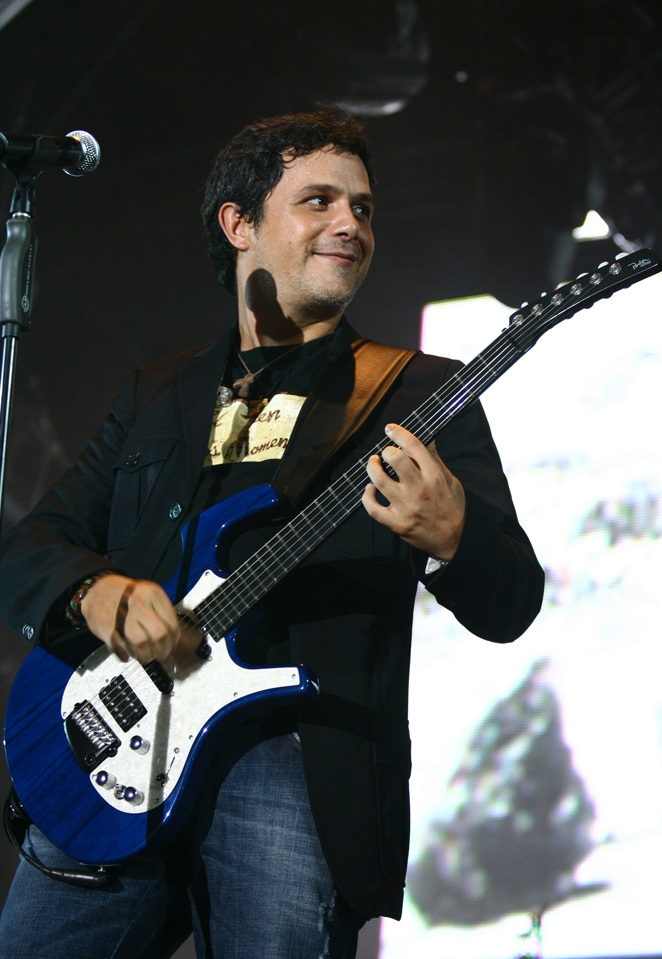
Alejandro Sanz, winner for Best Musical Theme

Best Telenovela	Best Multiplatform Telenovela
Pasión y poder; Antes muerta que Lichita; A que no me dejas; La sombra del pasado; La vecina; Muchacha italiana viene a casarse	Antes muerta que Lichita; Amor de barrio; Amores con trampa; A que no me dejas
Best Actress	Best Actor
Maite Perroni – Antes muerta que Lichita; Esmeralda Pimentel – La vecina; Livia Brito – Muchacha italiana viene a casarse; Michelle Renaud – La sombra del pasado; Zuria Vega – Que te perdone Dios	Pablo Lyle – La sombra del pasado; Arath de la Torre – Antes muerta que Lichita; Jorge Salinas – Pasión y poder; Juan Diego Covarrubias – La vecina; Osvaldo Benavides – A que no me dejas
Best Antagonist Actress	Best Antagonist Actor
Laura Carmine – A que no me dejas; Alejandra Barros – La sombra del pasado; Grettell Valdez – Lo imperdonable; Íngrid Martz – Antes muerta que Lichita; Marisol del Olmo – Amor de barrio	Fernando Colunga – Pasión y poder; Alejandro Ávila – Que te perdone Dios; Alexis Ayala – La sombra del pasado; Eduardo Santamarina – Antes muerta que Lichita; Julián Gil – Hasta el fin del mundo
Best Leading Actress	Best Leading Actor
Leticia Calderón – A que no me dejas; Ana Bertha Espín – Que te perdone Dios; Cynthia Klitbo – La sombra del pasado; Isela Vega – Muchacha italiana viene a casarse; Sylvia Pasquel – Antes muerta que Lichita	Arturo Peniche – A que no me dejas; Carlos Bracho – La vecina; Ignacio López Tarso – Amores con trampa; Luis Bayardo – Pasión y poder; Manuel "Flaco" Ibáñez – Antes muerta que Lichita
Best Co-lead Actress	Best Co-lead Actor
Susana González – La sombra del pasado; Alejandra García – Amor de barrio; Cecilia Gabriela – A que no me dejas; Chantal Andere – Antes muerta que Lichita; Claudia Ramírez – Lo imperdonable	José Pablo Minor – Pasión y poder; Alejandro Ibarra – La vecina; Diego Olivera – Hasta el fin del mundo; Osvaldo de León – Lo imperdonable; Pablo Valentín – Antes muerta que Lichita
Best Supporting Actress	Best Supporting Actor
Fabiola Guajardo – Pasión y poder; Beatriz Moreno – La sombra del pasado; Jessica Coch – Amor de barrio; Luz Elena González – Antes muerta que Lichita; Raquel Garza – Muchacha italiana viene a casarse	Pierre Angelo – La vecina; Alejandro Tommasi – Hasta el fin del mundo; Manuel "Flaco" Ibáñez – La sombra del pasado; Manuel Landeta – Amor de barrio; Ricardo Fastlicht – Antes muerta que Lichita
Best Young Lead Actress	Best Young Lead Actor
Wendy González – Antes muerta que Lichita; Alejandra García – Que te perdone Dios; Gabriela Carrillo – Amor de barrio; Scarlet Dergal – Amores con trampa; Thelma Madrigal – La sombra del pasado	Brandon Peniche – Que te perdone Dios; Alfonso Dosal – A que no me dejas; Alfredo Gatica – La vecina; Diego de Erice – La sombra del pasado; Paul Stanley – Amor de barrio
Best Female Revelation	Best Male Revelation
Ela Velden – Muchacha italiana viene a casarse; Ana Paula Martínez – Antes muerta que Lichita; Edsa Ramírez – La vecina; Irina Baeva – Pasión y poder; Jessica Decote – Amores con trampa	José Carlos Farrera – La sombra del pasado; Aldo Guerra – Amores con trampa; Danilo Carrera – Pasión y poder; Ignacio Casano – A que no me dejas; José Manuel Lechuga – La vecina
Best Musical Theme	Best Original Story or Adaptation
"A que no me dejas" — Alejandro Sanz – A que no me dejas; "La trampa" — Joan Sebastián – Amores con trampa; "La vecina" — Los Ángeles Azules – La vecina; "Si alguna vez" — Thalía – Antes muerta que Lichita; "Te prometí" — Mijares – La sombra del pasado	Martha Carrillo and Cristina García – A que no me dejas; Antonio Abascal – La sombra del pasado; Edwin Valencia, Lucero Suárez, Carmen Sepúlveda and Luis Reynoso – La vecina; María Eugenia Cervantes, Luis Mariani, Mario Iván Sánchez, Mariana Palos and Rocío Lara – Muchacha italiana viene a casarse; Pedro Armando Rodríguez, Alejandra Romero Meza, Humberto Robles and Héctor Valdés – Antes muerta que Lichita
Best Direction	Best Direction of the Cameras
Lily Garza and Fernando Nesme – A que no me dejas; Benjamín Cann and Rodrigo Zaunbos – Antes muerta que Lichita; Claudia Elisa Aguilar and Juan Pablo Blanco – La vecina; José Elías Moreno – La sombra del pasado; Juan Carlos Muñoz and Luis Pardo – Muchacha italiana viene a casarse	Alejandro Frutos Maza and Jorge Amaya Rodríguez – A que no me dejas; Bernardo Nájera and Víctor Soto – La vecina; Daniel Ferrer and Alejandro Álvarez – Antes muerta que Lichita; Marco Vinicio – La sombra del pasado; Vivian Sánchez – Muchacha italiana viene a casarse
Best Cast
Pasión y poder; Antes muerta que Lichita; A que no me dejas; La sombra del pasado; La vecina

=== Others ===
Best Unit program	Best Variety Program
Como dice el dicho; La rosa de Guadalupe; Laura	Hoy; Adal, el show; Estrella2; Sabadazo
Best Entertainment Program	Best Competitions Program
Me caigo de risa; Diablito show; Tour nocturno; Vas con todo; Zona ruda	Noches de traje; Me pongo de pie; Recuerda y gana
Best Restricted TV Program
Está cañón; Amordidas; Miembros al aire; MoJoe; Netas divinas

=== Performers ===
Name(s)	Performed
Alejandro Sanz	"Un zombie a la intemperie"
Alejandro Sanz; Jesse & Joy	"No soy una de esas"
Emmanuel; Mijares	"Corazón de melao" and "Baño de mujeres"
J Balvin	"Ahi vamos" and "Ginza"
Maite Perroni	"Yo te extrañaré" during the annual In Memoriam tribute
Osmani García	"El taxi"

=== Absent ===
People who did not attend the ceremony and were nominated in the shortlist in each category:

- Alexis Núñez
- Emilio Larrosa
- Javier Labrada
- Juan Carlos Muñoz
- Laura Bozzo
- Luis Pardo
- Manuel Landeta
- Rubén Galindo
- Santiago Galindo

== In Memoriam ==
- Ninón Sevilla
- Hector Carrion
- Magda Guzmán
- Perro Aguayo Jr.
- María Elena Velasco
- Jaime Almeida
- Jacobo Zabludovsky
- Alicia del Lago
- Joan Sebastian
- Julián Pastor
- Barbara Gil
- José Ángel Espinoza
- Germán Robles
- Juan Carlos Serran
- Alfred Rojas
- María Luisa Alcalá
- Carlos Cámara
- Pedro Weber
