= Muchacha italiana viene a casarse =

Muchacha italiana viene a casarse may refer to:

- Muchacha italiana viene a casarse (1971 TV series)
- Muchacha italiana viene a casarse (2014 TV series)
- Muchacha italiana viene a casarse, a 1969 Argentine telenovela starring Alejandra Da Passano and Rodolfo Ranni
