= Ela Velden =

Mexican actress

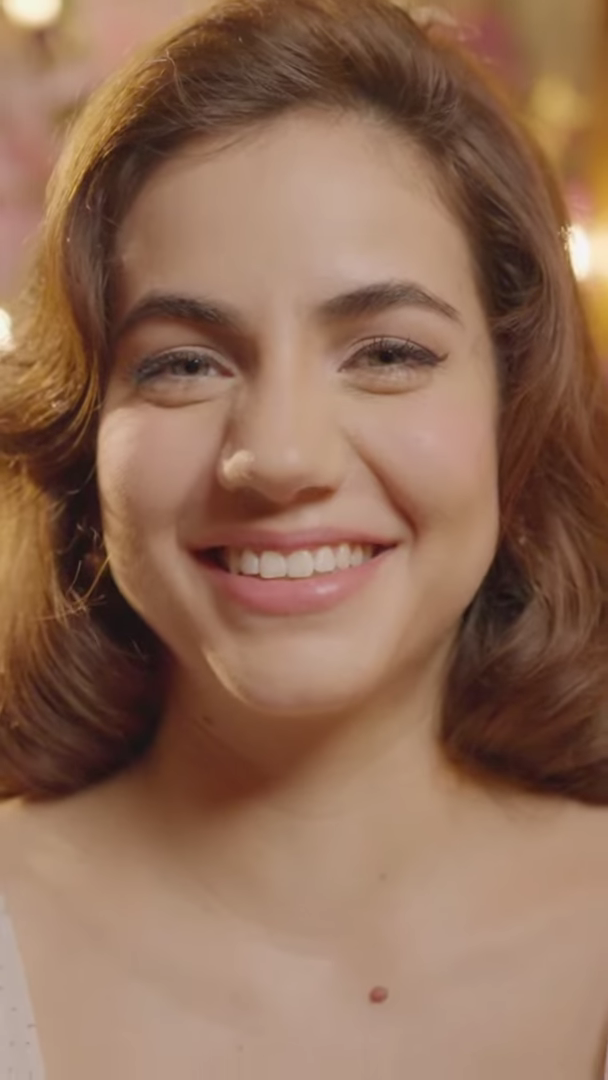
- Velden in 2023
- Born: Daniela Campos Reséndiz; Querétaro, Querétaro, Mexico
- Occupations: Actress; model
- Years active: 2012–present

Ela Velden (born Daniela Campos Reséndiz) is a Mexican actress and model. In October 2014, she made her telenovela debut co-starring in producer Pedro Damián's remake, Muchacha italiana viene a casarse. In 2016, she starred as the lead role in Despertar contigo.

== Early life ==
Daniela Campos Reséndiz was born in Querétaro. She has a sister. She began modeling at 13 and appeared in commercials, editorials, and fashion shows as a teenager. She also appeared in ads for Garnier's "100% de color" campaign alongside singer Dulce Maria in 2010. When she was 18 years old, she left Querétaro and settled in Mexico City where she studied at Televisa's acting school, Centro de Educación Artística from 2011 to 2013. She appeared in several school productions and graduated after completing a three-year course in 2013. Her artistic name was chosen after she unsuccessfully attempted to register as an actress under her birth name.

== Acting career ==
In 2013, Velden debuted as an actress in the Mexican television series, Gossip Girl: Acapulco. Originally, she was cast as "Jenny Parra" and filmed a promotional trailer for the show, but when the role was recast, she later appeared in a recurring role as "Gaby". The show was filmed on location in Acapulco, Mexico from January to May 2013. It premiered exclusively on the subscription channel, Golden Premier, in Mexico on August 5, 2013. The show was canceled after one season. Following the conclusion of Gossip Girl: Acapulco, she filmed an appearance on the teen-oriented telenovela, Niñas Mal 2 for MTV Latin America. She also participated in several episodes of the Mexican television drama series, Como dice el dicho, in the spring and summer of 2014.

In May 2014, Velden auditioned in Mexico City for a role in producer Pedro Damián's latest telenovela remake, Muchacha italiana viene a casarse. The telenovela is based on the popular 1971 Mexican telenovela of the same name. In July of that same year, she was announced as one of the actors in the final considerations for a role in the telenovela. In August, Velden's participation in Muchacha italiana viene a casarse was officially confirmed. This is her debut role in a telenovela. Prior to production, she studied Italian for six months in order to more accurately portray her character. Filming began on August 25, 2014 where she and some of the cast traveled to Maratea, Italy and filmed scenes and promotional material for two weeks. Scenes for the finale were filmed in Maratea and Naples, Italy, where production was completed in mid-May 2015. The telenovela aired weekdays on Canal de las Estrellas, following its premiere on October 20, 2014. Its final episode aired on June 21, 2015 in Mexico.

=== 2015 to present ===
On May 28, 2015, Velden made her theater debut as "Susana" in the original production, Gélidas Caricias. The drama also starred Jorge Gallegos, Jade Fraser and Nicole Vale who both alternated as "Susana". The play premiered on May 21, 2015 in Mexico City at Teatro en Corto. It ran every week until June 28, 2015. Beginning on July 19, 2015 until late August 2015, Velden appeared in the play, El Profesor alongside Damián Alcázar. The play was performed at Foro Cultural Chapultepec in Mexico City. Later, the cast embarked on a small theater tour throughout Mexico in August 2015. She also appeared in the comedy play, Tenis, an adaptation of the highly successful Argentine version. The play premiered at La Teatrería in Mexico City on September 17, 2015 and ran until November 19, 2015. She had a role in the telenovela drama, A que no me dejas, in the program's second season. The telenovela began airing its second season on November 3, 2015 on Canal de las Estrellas.

For her work in Muchacha italiana viene a casarse, Velden received the award for "Mejor Actriz Revelación" (Best Female Revelation) at the 2016 Premios TV y Novelas award show, held in Acapulco on April 17, 2016. On May 14, 2016, Velden was announced as the lead actress for producer Pedro Damián's telenovela, Despertar contigo. Despertar contigo premiered on Canal de las Estrellas on August 8, 2016 and aired weeknights. It later premiered in the U.S. on Univision on August 30, 2016 where it aired weeknights. In 2020, she appeared in six episodes as "Lupe" in the second season of Diablero, a Mexican series for Netflix.

== Personal life ==
Velden was in relationship with Argentine actor Federico Ayos from 2017 to 2018. In late 2018, she confirmed on Instagram to be in a relationship with actor Emiliano Zurita. Their relationship ended after four years; their separation was confirmed in 2023. She is the co-founder and co-owner of the female-led media production agency, Ellas Cuatro.

Due to the negative environmental and social impacts of fast fashion, she expressed a desire to open a clothing stall to sell and donate her clothing in a 2024 interview with the Mexican entertainment press. She further explained to the media that she does not own any designer clothing and prefers buying "ropa de paca", or secondhand clothing imported to Mexico from the United States and other countries and sold at flea markets and thrift stores.

== Filmography ==
=== Television roles ===
Year	Title	Role	Notes
2013	Gossip Girl: Acapulco	Gaby / Jenny Parra	21 episodes
2013	Niñas mal	Flavia	1 episode
2014	La rosa de Guadalupe	Lucina	Episode: "Me alquilo para ser novio"
2014	Como dice el dicho	Marifer Andrea Candela	Episode: "Cada quien busca su cebolla..." Episode: "Apuesta ilegal..." Episode: "Cada quien es arquitecto..."
2014–2015	Muchacha italiana viene a casarse	Gianna Bianchi	Supporting role; 173 episodes
2015–2016	A que no me dejas	Fernanda Ricart Medina	Main role; 65 episodes
2016–2017	Despertar contigo	Maia Alcalá González	Lead role; 122 episodes
2017	Renta congelada	Jules	Episode: "Alta seducción"
2017–2018	Caer en tentación	Mía Becker Cohen	Main role; 101 episodes
2017–2018	40 y 20	Mónica	Guest star; 2 episodes
2019–2021	El juego de las llaves	Siena	Main role (season 1-2); 18 episodes
2020	Diablero	Lupe Reyna	6 episodes
2020	Rubí	Carla Rangel / Fernanda Perez Ochoa	Main role; 26 episodes
2021	Who Killed Sara?	Marifer Fernández Gálvez (young)	Recurring role; 19 episodes
2023	Horario central	Jimena del Solar	10 episodes
2023	Senda prohibida	Nora López Jiménez / Corina	Lead role; 21 episodes
2024–2025	Las hijas de la señora García	Mar Sánchez García	Main role; 82 episodes
2026	Mi rival	Bárbara Cruz García	Lead role; 50 episodes

=== Music videos ===
Year	Artist	Title
2017	Río Roma and CNCO	"Princesa"
2019	Vadhir Derbez	"Toda La Banda"

== Awards and nominations ==
Year	Category	Nominated work	Award Show	Result
2015	Favorite Revelation	Muchacha italiana viene a casarse	Nickelodeon Mexico Kids' Choice Awards	Nominated
2016	Best Female Revelation	Muchacha italiana viene a casarse	Premios TVyNovelas	Won
2018	Best Young Lead Actress	Caer en tentación	Premios TVyNovelas	Won
