= La candidata =

Mexican telenovela

- Genre: Telenovela
- Created by: Leonardo Bechini; Óscar Tabernise
- Based on: La Candidata by Ariana Martín; Marta Azcona; Jordi Arencón; Miguel Hervás; Covadonga Espeso
- Written by: María Elena López
- Screenplay by: Óscar Tavernise
- Story by: Leonardo Bechini; Ariana Martín; Marta Azcona; Jordi Arencón; Miguel Hervás; Covadonga Espeso
- Directed by: Juan Pablo Blanco; Eric Morales
- Creative director: Jimena Galeotti
- Starring: Silvia Navarro; Víctor González; Rafael Sanchez Navarro; Susana González
- Music by: Jordi Bachbush
- Opening theme: "La candidata"
- Country of origin: Mexico
- Original language: Spanish
- No. of seasons: 1
- No. of episodes: 61

Production
- Executive producer: Giselle González
- Producer: Julieta de la O.
- Cinematography: Luis García; Alfredo Kassem; Luis Arturo Rodríguez; Armando Zafra
- Editors: Julio Abreu; Juan José Segundo; Juan Franco
- Camera setup: Multi-camera
- Production company: Televisa

Original release
- Network: Las Estrellas
- Release: November 21, 2016 – February 12, 2017

Related
- Sin rastro de ti; La doble vida de Estela Carrillo

La candidata is a Mexican telenovela produced by Giselle González for Televisa. It is an original story about the world of politics. A total of 60 episodes have been confirmed so far.

La Candidata was well received by critics, with its divergence in tone from previous telenovelas and the addressing of topics, such as political corruption, being particularly praised. It won eight awards at the 35th TVyNovelas Awards, including Best Telenovela of the Year.

== Plot ==
The main character, Regina, is a senator married to the leader of her city's government. The show follows Regina's attempts to improve the political situation for the people she represents against a backdrop of her strained relationship with her husband and the rebellion of her young son.

When Regina's husband Alonso decides to run for the presidential candidacy, he reveals darker aspects of his personality as he ruthlessly pursues his political ambitions. Regina's political ideals clash with her husband's as he disregards her earlier contributions to his success and takes steps to destroy his current political adversaries, not realizing his wife is now among their number. As the political tension between Regina and her husband becomes untenable, Regina's former lover, a man named Gerardo, reappears in her life. Gerardo becomes Alonso's rival in both politics and love. Regina decides that her life with Alonso has been a lie and takes steps to end their relationship.

Many of Alonso's corrupt political dealings are made public, confirming for Regina that she made the correct choice to leave him. The revelations about Alonso's political activities also convinces Regina that someone must permanently destroy Alonso's political career in order to put an end to his corruption. Gerardo puts aside his own political ambitions in order to support Regina as she joins the race for the presidential nomination and becomes the candidate herself.

== Cast ==
=== Main ===
- Silvia Navarro as Regina Bárcenas
- Víctor González as Gerardo Martínez
- Rafael Sánchez Navarro as Alonso San Román
- Susana González as Cecilia Aguilar

=== Secondary ===
- Nailea Norvind as Teresa Rivera
- Ari Telch as Ignacio
- Helena Rojo as Natalia de San Román
- Patricio Castillo as Omar San Román
- Luz María Jerez as Noemí
- Juan Carlos Barreto as Mario Bárcenas
- Juan Carlos Colombo as Morales
- Verónica Langer as Magda
- Adalberto Parra as Mauro Castillo
- Pilar Ixquic Mata as Isela Aguilar
- Gilberto de Anda as Almirón
- Enrique Arreola as Pacheco
- Irineo Álvarez as Larreta
- José Carlos Ruiz as Presidente del Senado
- Fabiola Guajardo as Florencia
- Fernanda Borches as Daniela
- Federico Ayos as Emiliano San Román Bárcenas
- Juan Martín Jáuregui as Hernán
- Karla Farfán as Ximena Martínez Rivera
- Aleyda Gallardo as Nieves
- Ángel Cerlo as Ochoa
- Ricardo Crespo as Javier
- Bárbara Falconi as Nayeli
- Michelle González as Marcia
- Fabián Robles as José Montero
- Aurora Clavel as José's mother

=== Special participation ===
- Liz Gallardo as Déborah Rondero
- Fernando Larrañaga as Pablo Contreras
- Tony Marcín as Mother of Hugo
- Martha Julia as Jéssica Manjarrez

== Production ==
Filming began on August 16, 2016, at Televisa San Ángel.

=== Casting ===
Casting for the telenovela began from June through August 2016. Actors Juan Carlos Barreto, Helena Rojo, Luz María Jerez, Nailea Norvind, Ari Telch, Federico Ayos and Adalberto Parra were cast in unknown Roles. On July 13, 2016, Susana González was cast as the sister of the protagonist. Two days later, Rafael Sánchez Navarro was cast as the husband of the protagonist. Blanca Guerra was cast as the titular role, but was replaced by Silvia Navarro because of tight schedule. For the role of the main male protagonist, Mark Tacher, Víctor González and Juan Pablo Medina were nominees, but ultimately the role went to Víctor González.

== Reception ==
Following the premiere, television critic Álvaro Cueva said La Candidata represented a fundamental change for the better of the national television industry. Besides its theme (which he contrasted with previous political telenovelas), Cueva also praised the cinematography, hair and makeup, wardrobe, and music. After the finale, Cueva lauded the creators for the original script and for their depiction of a gritty situation in Mexico, rather than making another remake or Cinderella story.

In November 2016, certain media outlets that support MORENA leader Andrés Manuel López Obrador, a likely presidential candidate, expressed their belief that this television program was created in order to favor former First Lady Margarita Zavala, possible PAN candidate, in the 2018 Presidential Election. In an overview after the show's finale, Milenio commentator Fernando Mejía Barquera mentioned these assertions saying that those "who held this position must have abandoned it during the course of the telenovela because nothing of the main character was reminiscent of the former first lady." With the main character being described as a populist.

== Episodes ==
No.	Title	Original release date	U.S. air date	US viewers (millions)
1	"Buscando un culpable"	November 21, 2016	May 29, 2017	0.58
2	"Cecilia teme por su vida"	November 22, 2016	May 30, 2017	0.62
3	"Regina sospecha que su padre tiene un amante"	November 23, 2016	May 31, 2017	0.55
4	"Alonso y Cecilia trabajarán juntos"	November 24, 2016	June 5, 2017	0.55
5	"Mario es secuestrado"	November 25, 2016	June 6, 2017	0.58
6	"Regina en contra de la corrupción"	November 28, 2016	June 7, 2017	0.58
7	"Regina se disculpa con Cecilia"	November 29, 2016	June 9, 2017	0.40
8	"Regina y Gerardo quedan expuestos"	November 30, 2016	June 12, 2017	0.52
9	"Omar manda a matar a Javier"	December 1, 2016	June 13, 2017	0.34
10	"El encuentro de Cecilia y Alonso"	December 2, 2016	June 14, 2017	0.35
11	"Emiliano se culpa por la muerte de Hugo"	December 5, 2016	June 15, 2017	0.30
12	"Omar amenaza a Natalia"	December 6, 2016	June 16, 2017	0.38
13	"Regina presentará su candidatura"	December 7, 2016	June 19, 2017	0.36
14	"Mario sufre un infarto"	December 8, 2016	June 20, 2017	0.31
15	"La mentira de Gerardo"	December 9, 2016	June 21, 2017	0.30
16	"Pacheco investiga a Cecilia"	December 12, 2016	June 22, 2017	0.31
17	"Regina rechaza el amor de Gerardo"	December 13, 2016	June 26, 2017	0.24
18	"Alonso trata de recuperar el amor de Regina"	December 14, 2016	June 27, 2017	0.17
19	"Gerardo y Alonso se enfrentan"	December 15, 2016	June 29, 2017	0.23
20	"Gerardo ataca a Ignacio"	December 16, 2016	June 30, 2017	0.17
21	"Gerardo dispuesto a todo por Regina"	December 19, 2016	July 3, 2017	0.20
22	"Regina cede ante el amor de Gerardo"	December 20, 2016	July 4, 2017	0.29
23	"Teresa le hace un escándalo a Regina"	December 21, 2016	July 5, 2017	0.25
24	"Regina enfrenta a Cecilia"	December 22, 2016	July 6, 2017	0.25
25	"Regina pone a Gerardo en su contra"	December 23, 2016	July 10, 2017	0.28
26	"Cecilia revela que tiene una hermana"	December 26, 2016	July 17, 2017	0.21
27	"Noemí es atropellada"	December 27, 2016	July 18, 2017	0.22
28	"Cecilia celosa de Lorena"	December 28, 2016	July 20, 2017	0.36
29	"Natalia intenta escapar"	December 29, 2016	July 21, 2017	0.23
30	"Emiliano es víctima de Cecilia"	December 30, 2016	July 24, 2017	0.41
31	"Regina renuncia a su partido"	January 2, 2017	July 25, 2017	0.32
32	"Mauro es el nuevo gobernador"	January 3, 2017	July 26, 2017	0.28
33	"Regina y Gerardo envueltos el deseo"	January 4, 2017	July 27, 2017	0.18
34	"Regina comienza la guerra contra Alonso"	January 5, 2017	July 28, 2017	0.19
35	"Cecilia inicia su venganza contra Regina"	January 6, 2017	July 31, 2017	0.25
36	"Gerardo o tu familia"	January 9, 2017	August 1, 2017	0.22
37	"Teresa está embarazada"	January 10, 2017	August 2, 2017	0.29
38	"Nayeli le pone una trampa a Ximena"	January 11, 2017	August 3, 2017	0.17
39	"Teresa arruinará la vida de Gerardo"	January 12, 2017	August 4, 2017	0.16
40	"Omar ordena matar a Mario"	January 13, 2017	August 7, 2017	0.24
41	"Mario estalla frente a Cecilia"	January 16, 2017	August 8, 2017	0.20
42	"Alonso usa a Emiliano"	January 17, 2017	August 9, 2017	0.19
43	"Ignacio ataca a Almirón"	January 18, 2017	August 10, 2017	0.21
44	"Emiliano contra Alonso"	January 19, 2017	August 11, 2017	0.14
45	"Alonso deja todo por Regina"	January 20, 2017	August 14, 2017	0.20
46	"Regina se postula como La Candidata"	January 23, 2017	August 15, 2017	0.25
47	"Emiliano es culpable"	January 24, 2017	August 16, 2017	0.27
48	"Alonso amenaza de muerte a Regina"	January 25, 2017	August 17, 2017	0.28
49	"Emiliano sufre un atentado"	January 26, 2017	August 18, 2017	0.22
50	"Teresa provoca una pelea con Regina"	January 27, 2017	August 21, 2017	0.25
51	"Teresa pide que Alonso mate a Gerardo"	January 30, 2017	August 24, 2017	0.24
52	"Gerardo es acusado por Teresa"	January 31, 2017	August 25, 2017	0.19
53	"Cecilia pide hundir a Regina"	February 1, 2017	August 28, 2017	0.30
54	"Gerardo va a la cárcel"	February 2, 2017	August 29, 2017	0.29
55	"Omar sufre un terrible accidente"	February 3, 2017	August 30, 2017	0.25
56	"Regina se entera que Cecilia es su hermana"	February 6, 2017	August 31, 2017	0.24
57	"Mario suplica la ayuda de Cecilia"	February 7, 2017	September 1, 2017	0.27
58	"Lorena en manos de "El Chulo""	February 8, 2017	September 4, 2017	0.32
59	"Regina se enfrenta con Mario"	February 9, 2017	September 5, 2017	0.34
60	"Alonso y Escalante deciden ser socios"	February 10, 2017	September 6, 2017	0.27
61	"Gran final"	February 12, 2017	September 7, 2017 September 8, 2017	0.33 0.33

== Awards and nominations ==
Year	Award	Category	Nominated	Result
2017	35th TVyNovelas Awards	Best Telenovela of the Year	Giselle González	Won
2017	35th TVyNovelas Awards	Best Actress	Silvia Navarro	Nominated
2017	35th TVyNovelas Awards	Best Actor	Victor González	Nominated
2017	35th TVyNovelas Awards	Best Antagonist Actress	Nailea Norvind	Nominated
2017	35th TVyNovelas Awards	Best Antagonist Actor	Juan Carlos Barreto	Won
2017	35th TVyNovelas Awards	Best Leading Actress	Helena Rojo	Won
2017	35th TVyNovelas Awards	Best Leading Actor	Patricio Castillo	Nominated
2017	35th TVyNovelas Awards	Best Co-lead Actress	Susana González	Won
2017	35th TVyNovelas Awards	Best Co-lead Actor	Rafael Sánchez Navarro	Nominated
2017	35th TVyNovelas Awards	Best Supporting Actress	Pilar Mata	Nominated
2017	35th TVyNovelas Awards	Best Supporting Actor	Ari Telch	Nominated
2017	35th TVyNovelas Awards	Best Young Lead Actress	Karla Farfán	Nominated
2017	35th TVyNovelas Awards	Best Young Lead Actor	Federico Ayos	Nominated
2017	35th TVyNovelas Awards	Best Female Revelation	Michelle González	Nominated
2017	35th TVyNovelas Awards	Best Male Revelation	Juan Martín Jáuregui	Nominated
2017	35th TVyNovelas Awards	Best Original Story or Adaptation	Leonardo Bechini	Won
2017	35th TVyNovelas Awards	Best Direction	Eric Morales and Juan Pablo Blanco	Won
2017	35th TVyNovelas Awards	Best Direction of the Camaras	Armando Zafra and Luis Rodríguez	Won
2017	35th TVyNovelas Awards	Best Musical Theme	"Instrumental" (n/a)	Nominated
2017	35th TVyNovelas Awards	Best Cast	La candidata	Won
