= The Stray Cat =

Mexican telenovela

- La Gata
- Genre: Telenovela
- Written by: María Antonieta Calú Gutiérrez; Tere Medina; Dolores Ortega
- Story by: Inés Rodena; Carlos Romero
- Directed by: Víctor Fouilloux; Victor Rodriguez
- Starring: Maite Perroni; Daniel Arenas; Laura Zapata
- Theme music composer: Jorge Eduardo Murguía; Mauricio Arriaga
- Opening theme: "Vas a querer volver" performed by Maite Perroni
- Country of origin: Mexico
- Original language: Spanish
- No. of episodes: 121

Production
- Executive producer: Nathalie Lartilleux
- Producer: Leticia Díaz
- Production locations: Mexico City, Mexico; New York City, New York, U.S.
- Editors: Alfredo Frutos Maza; Marco Antonio Rocha

Original release
- Network: Canal de las Estrellas
- Release: May 5 – October 19, 2014

Related
- Por siempre mi amor; Muchacha italiana viene a casarse; La gata (1968)

The Stray Cat (Original title: La Gata; lit. 'The Cat') is a Mexican telenovela produced by Nathalie Lartilleux for Televisa. It is a remake of the Venezuelan telenovela La Gata, produced in 1968.

Maite Perroni, Daniel Arenas and Laura Zapata star in the lead roles.

== Plot ==
The story takes place in the outskirts of Mexico City, where a 12-year-old girl named Esmeralda lives; she is always "disheveled and dirty" like a "Stray Cat" (una "gata"). Esmeralda is a young girl from a poor neighbourhood who grew up without her parents and learned to be happy with what little she had. She was raised from childhood by an elderly woman named Mrs. Rita who exploited her by making her go ask alms, sell candy and newspapers. Esmeralda could neither read nor write. She meets Pablo Martínez-Negrete, a high society rich boy who teaches her to read and write and with whom she becomes friends. Since then, Esmeralda notices that he is the first person to call her by her name and the first one who really truly cares for her. But Pablo's mother, Lorenza, opposes his friendship with "The Stray Cat".

Several years later, Esmeralda grows up and becomes a beautiful young woman who has not changed since childhood. Pablo realizes that he sees "The Stray Cat" as more than a friend and feels confused as to what he truly feels for her. Esmeralda starts looking for job thanks to Pablo, since she does not want to keep asking for alms and she does not want Pablo to keep giving her money. Lorenza strongly opposes the friendship between her son and Esmeralda and alienates her from him. Pablo is pushed to fall in love with Mónica, a girl who comes from "a good social position" and is also his "cousin".

Agustín, Pablo's father, convinces Pablo that he should study for his master's degree abroad and marry Mónica once he returns, a trick to separate him from Esmeralda. Pablo and Esmeralda decide to marry secretly before he goes abroad. From New York City, Pablo emails his father asking him to help him fix travel papers for Esmeralda so she can reunite with him there. Pablo's father pretends to want to help him but has no interest in doing so.

After several months, Esmeralda gives birth to twins, a boy and a girl. Doña Rita, who has always sought to benefit from "The Stray Cat", forces her to marry Doménico "El Italiano" Almonte. Esmeralda, having no other solution, agrees to marry him only to purchase medicine for her daughter, Leticia, who is sick.

"El Silencioso", Esmeralda's biological father, gets out of jail and vows to take revenge on those who locked him up unjustly for using self-defense. Esmeralda later meets him, but ignores her true origin. The man takes her into his house and promises her that he wants to be a father to her and a grandfather to her children. Pablo returns from abroad to marry Mónica, believing Esmeralda had betrayed him. He thinks that the twins are not his and that she has a relationship with "El Silencioso". "The Stray Cat" will have to use her strong character to get Pablo's love back.

== Cast ==
=== Main ===
- Maite Perroni as Esmeralda "The Stray Cat" / Renata de la Santa Cruz
- Daniel Arenas as Pablo Martínez-Negrete
- Laura Zapata as Lorenza de Martínez-Negrete

==== Secondary ====
- Erika Buenfil as Rafaela "Fela" / Blanca Rafaela de la Santa Cruz
- Manuel Ojeda as "El Silencioso" / Don Fernando de la Santa Cruz
- Pilar Pellicer as Doña Rita Olea Pérez
- Jorge Poza as Mariano Martínez-Negrete
- Leticia Perdigón as Leticia "La Jarocha"
- Juan Verduzco as Agustín Martínez-Negrete
- Lupita Lara as Eugenia Castañeda
- Socorro Bonilla as Mercedes "Doña Meche" Reyes
- Carlos Bonavides as Doménico "El Italiano" Almonte
- Ianis Guerrero as Damián Reyes
- Mariluz Bermúdez as Virginia Martínez-Negrete
- Pierre Louis as Carlos "El Centavito"
- Óscar Ferreti as Don Lupe
- Teo Tapia as Roberto Elizalde
- Alejandra Robles Gil as Inés Olea Pérez
- Jorge Alberto Bolaños as Omar
- Benjamín Rivero as Jesús Olea Pérez "Tílico" / Juan Garza
- Ruth Rosas as Dorita
- Ricardo Baranda as Garabato / Víctor de la Fuente
- Jorge Ortín as Osorio
- Laurinne Kuaka as Verónica
- Claudio Báez as Ernesto Cantú
- Elizabeth Dupeyrón as Carolina de Cantú
- Antonio Medellín as Director of jail
- Anic Moss as Alicia
- Patricia Maqueo as Child Esmeralda
- José Eduardo Álvarez as Child Pablo
- Ana Sofía Durand as Child Virginia
- Christian Vega as Child Mariano
- Mauro Navarro as Child Garabato
- Karim Cadet as Child Centavito
- Rogelio Hernández as Child Damián

=== Guest star ===
- Mónika Sánchez as Gisela Sinfuegos

== Mexico broadcast ==
La gata premiered on May 5, 2014, and earned 17.7 points of rating in its 4 p.m. time slot. It was the third highest rated telenovela of the evening on Canal de las Estrellas. Univision started broadcasting La Gata in the United States on September 1, 2014, weeknights at 7pm/6c replacing De que te quiero, te quiero. The last episode was broadcast on February 13, 2015, with La sombra del pasado replacing it on February 16, 2015.

Season	Timeslot (ET/PT)	No. of episodes	Premiered		Ended	
Season	Timeslot (ET/PT)	No. of episodes	Date	Premiere Ratings	Date	Finale Ratings
2014	Monday to Friday 4:15 PM	121	May 5, 2014	17.7	October 19, 2014	20.9

== Awards and nominations ==
Year	Award	Category	Nominated	Result
2014	Kids Choice Awards México	Favorite Actress	Maite Perroni	Nominated
2014	People en Español Awards	Best Telenovela	La Gata	Nominated
2014	People en Español Awards	Best Actress	Maite Perroni	Nominated
2014	People en Español Awards	Heartthrob of the Year	Daniel Arenas	Nominated
2014	People en Español Awards	The Meanest Bad Girl	Laura Zapata	Nominated
2014	People en Español Awards	Best On-Screen Chemistry	Maite Perroni; Daniel Arenas	Nominated
2014	TV Adicto Golden Awards	Best International Star	Laura Zapata	Won
2014	TV Adicto Golden Awards	Best Female Lead	Maite Perroni	Won
2015	TVyNovelas Awards	Best Actress	Maite Perroni	Nominated
2015	TVyNovelas Awards	Best Actor	Daniel Arenas	Nominated
2015	TVyNovelas Awards	Best Leading Actor	Manuel Ojeda	Nominated
2015	TVyNovelas Awards	Best Co-lead Actor	Patricio Castillo	Nominated
2015	Juventud Awards	Favorite Female Protagonist	Maite Perroni	Nominated
2015	Juventud Awards	Favorite Male Protagonist	Daniel Arenas	Nominated
2015	Juventud Awards	Best Telenovela Theme	"Vas a querer volver" performed by Maite Perroni	Nominated
