= Despertar contigo =

Mexican telenovela

- Genre: Telenovela
- Screenplay by: María Cervantes Balmorí; Mario Iván Sánchez; Mariana Palos; Luis Mariani; Rocío Lara
- Story by: Juan Carlos Pérez Florez; Adriana Suárez
- Directed by: Juan Carlos Muñoz; Pedro Damián; Luis Pardo
- Creative director: Alexis Covasevich
- Starring: Daniel Arenas; Ela Velden; Aura Cristina Geithner; Enoc Leaño
- Theme music composer: Carlos Vives
- Opening theme: "Volví a Nacer" performed by Carlos Vives and Maluma
- Country of origin: Mexico
- Original language: Spanish
- No. of episodes: 121

Production
- Executive producer: Pedro Damián
- Producer: Luis Luisillo
- Cinematography: Vivian Sánchez Ross; Salvador Ortega; Daniel Ferrer
- Editors: Erika Castañeda; Noé Galindo; Yuri Murúa
- Camera setup: Multi-camera
- Production company: Televisa

Original release
- Network: Las Estrellas
- Release: August 8, 2016 – January 22, 2017

Related
- Pobre Pablo

Despertar contigo (English title: Waking up with you) is a Mexican telenovela produced by Pedro Damián for Televisa. It is a free version of the Colombian telenovela Pobre Pablo. The series originally aired from August 8, 2016 to January 22, 2017

The series is starring Daniel Arenas as Pablo Herminio, Ela Velden as Maia Alcalá, Aura Cristina Geithner as Antonia and Enoc Leaño as Othón.

== Plot ==
At a flower-growing convention, destiny brings together two young people whose love story begins when they meet. Maia and Pablo come from different social classes. Maia is Othón's oldest and only daughter after losing his son, Gael, in a house fire. Othón is one of the most important entrepreneurs of the flower cultivation and is heavily strict towards her. On the other hand, Pablo is part of the bodyguard squad of Antonia, the rival of Othón ... two people with many account slopes.

And it is because Antonia and Othón have known each other since they were young and do not miss a chance to hurt themselves, Antonia takes advantage of the meeting between Maia and Pablo to deceive Maia by saying that Pablo is one of the most important floriculturists of the country ... a lie whose purpose is not to hurt Maia, who does not care if Pablo is from a rich social class or not, but Othón, who is heavily strict towards Maia, wants her to be married to a wealthy man and would be actually more than destroyed if he knew that she loves a poor man.

But in addition, the love between Maia and Pablo is not only condemned by the entanglements that surround their encounter, but also by their former flames: Cindy and Federico. Cindy, who was Pablo's girlfriend in the past and calls him by his middle name, Herminio, comes back into his life, wanting Pablo back in a desperate and obsessive manner. Meanwhile, Federico is a junior who is with Maia for interest and wants to marry her with Othón's support (who believes that he is a millionaire). Both will do whatever they can to prevent a "stretched" and "naughty" from taking away, what they believe, belongs to them. With making things even worse for both Maia and Pablo, Maia turns out to be pregnant with Pablo's baby and decides to keep this a secret, by claiming that the baby is Federico's.

Bad blood, spite and jealousy are the condiments of this love story, which is born suddenly in the least expected place and tests the ingenuity and decision of Maia and Pablo.

== Cast ==
=== Main ===
- Daniel Arenas as Pablo Herminio Leal Bueno
- Ela Velden as Maia Alcalá González
- Aura Cristina Geithner as Antonia Santamaría
- Enoc Leano as Othón Alcalá

==== Secondary ====
- Alejandro Calva as Rafael Reyna
- Anna Ciocchetti as Cynthia Madrigal / Isaura Hidalgo de Reyna
- Antonio De Carlo as Rogelio
- Mara Cuevas as Carmen González de Alcalá
- Arturo García Tenorio as Ismael
- Leticia Huijara as Tulia Ventura
- Rodrigo Murray as Eligio Vallejo
- Sara Corrales as Cindy Reyna
- Christian Chávez as Christian Leal
- Estefanía Villarreal as Frida Díaz de la Vega
- Daniel Tovar as Rodolfo Soler
- Eloy Ganuza as Álvaro
- Gonzalo Peña as Federico Villegas
- Marcus Ornellas as Néstor
- Lucas Bernabé as Wilson
- Alejandro Valencia as Ferney
- Roberta Damián as Jenny Paola Leal
- Sebastián Poza as Abel
- Isidora Vives as Rosalía
- Claudia Acosta as Rufina
- Luz Aldán as Flora
- Armando Silvestre as Silvestre Leal

=== Guest ===
- Claudio Báez as El Coronel
- Maluma as Himself

== Awards and nominations ==
Year	Award	Category	Nominated	Result
2017	35th TVyNovelas Awards	Best Co-lead Actress	Leticia Huijara	Nominated
2017	35th TVyNovelas Awards	Best Cast	Despertar contigo	Nominated
