= Carla Cardona =

Mexican model and actress

- Born: Carla Denise Cardona González; May 10, 1987 (age 37); Cananea, Sonora, Mexico
- Occupation(s): Model, actress
- Years active: 2009–present
- Title: Nuestra Belleza Sonora 2007

Carla Cardona (born Carla Denise Cardona González on May 10, 1987, in Cananea, Mexico) is a Mexican model, actress and former beauty pageant titleholder . Career began after winning the contest Nuestra Belleza Sonora 2007.

== Biography ==
Cardona was on May 10, 1987, in Cananea, Sonora, Mexico. After winning the contest Nuestra Belleza Sonora 2007, she graduated from the CEA of Televisa. In 2009 played in Camaleones as Mercedes Márquez. In 2012 she had a special participation in Por ella soy Eva and also participated in the new production of Mapat L. de Zatarain, titled La mujer del Vendaval. She also acted as Maestra Eloisa in La rosa de Guadalupe in 2012.

In 2015 she was summoned for the telenovela Antes muerta que Lichita. In 2016 has a special participation in the telenovela Corazón que miente. The following year, in 2017, she was given a starring role in the telenovela Mi adorable maldición and the films La Jaula and El que busca, encuentra.

== Filmography ==
Telenovelas, Television, Films
Year	Title	Role	Notes
2009/10	Camaleones	Mercedes Márquez	Recurring role
2011	La fuerza del destino	Berenice Escalante	Recurring role
2012	Por ella soy Eva	Lover of Juan Carlos	Special appearance
2012	La mujer del Vendaval	Damiana Hernández Cotilla de Castelló	Special appearance
2012	La rosa de Guadalupe	Maestra Eloisa	1 Episode: "Las Verdaderas Pruebas del Amor"
2014	Como dice el dicho	Alejandra	1 Episode: "El que nunca ha tenido y llega a tener"
2015/16	Antes muerta que Lichita	Martha de Vidal	Recurring role
2016	Corazón que miente	Elena Solis Saldivar (young)	Special appearance
2016	Por Siempre Joan Sebastian	Angélica María	Special appearance
2017	La Jaula	Gabriela	Film
2017	El que busca, encuentra		Film
2017	Mi adorable maldición	Nadia del Valle	Recurring role
