= Eclipse de luna =

Album by Maite Perroni

Studio album by Maite Perroni
- Released: August 23, 2013 (World); November 14, 2013 (Brazil); July 15, 2014 (Editión De Luxe)(Mexico)
- Recorded: 2013
- Genre: Latin pop, Bachata
- Label: Warner Music

Maite Perroni chronology
Discography of RBD (2004-2009)	Eclipse de luna (2013)

Singles from Eclipse de Luna
- 1. "Tú y Yo" Released: June 17, 2013; 2. "Eclipse de Luna" Released: September 17, 2013

Singles from Eclipse de Luna: Deluxe Edition
- 1. "Vas a querer volver" Released: April 29, 2014; 2. "Como se Explica o Amor? (Brazil)" Released: July 15, 2014; 3. "Todo Lo Que Soy" Released: August 23, 2014

Eclipse de luna (English: Lunar Eclipse) is the debut solo studio album by Mexican singer and actress Maite Perroni. It was released on August 23, 2013 through Warner Music Group. Its physical edition was distributed four days later. On September 6, Perroni announced her record label was going to launch a Brazilian edition with appearance by Thiaguinho.

== Background ==
In February 2013, it was announced that the singer moved to New York City to study music and prepare her solo debut album. On April 12, 2013, during an interview with People en Español, Perroni stated - "It is a hard pretentious. We are not here to bring sounds never heard before. Just want to feel , to move the body and soul. I've been writing for a couple of weeks and need to record four songs to finish the album."

On June 17, 2013, through a twit cam, Perroni released the lyric video for the song " Tú y Yo"; the first single from the album in her official channel on YouTube. The single's release was scheduled for June 14, but was released on June 18, 2013, digitally.

== Track listing ==
1. Vas a querer volver
2. Tú y yo
3. Eclipse de luna
4. Todo lo que soy
5. Inexplicable
6. Como yo
7. Me va
8. Y lloro
9. Agua bendita
10. Llueve llueve
11. Melancolía (Saudade)
12. Que te hace falta
13. Sueno contigo
14. Ojos divinos
15. Los cangrejos
16. Loca de amor

== Charts ==
The album debuted on the Billboard Top Latin Albums at number 9 and at number 2 on the Latin Pop Albums. On the Mexican Albums Chart the album debuted at number 3.

Charts (2013)	Peak position
Mexican Albums Chart	3
U.S. Billboard Top Latin Albums	9
U.S. Billboard Latin Pop Albums	2

=== Year-end charts ===
Chart (2013)	Position
Brazilian Albums Chart	99

Chart (2014)	Position
Brazilian Albums Chart	88

=== Singles ===
Year	Song	Peaks									Album
Year	Song	MEX Monitor Latino	MEX Monitor Latino Pop	MEX Billboard México Airplay	MEX Billboard México Español Airplay	GRE Billboard Digital Songs	COS Monitec	US Latin Pop	US Latin Digital	US Latin Digital Pop	Album
2013	Tú y Yo	65	25	9	4	4	1	20	25	12	Eclipse de Luna
2013	Eclipse de Luna	122	43	27	12	11	5	—	—	—	Eclipse de Luna
2014	Vas a Querer Volver	62	20	19	6	—	3	19	—	19	Eclipse de Luna
2014	Todo Lo Que Soy (feat. Alex Ubago)	—	—	24	6	—	—	—	—	—	Eclipse de Luna
