= 2015 Premios Juventud =

12th Premios Juventud
- Date: July 16, 2015
- Location: Watsco Center in Coral Gables, Florida
- Hosted by: Ninel Conde, Alejandra Espinoza, William Levy and El Dasa
- Website: Official Page

Television/radio coverage
- Network: Univision

The 12th Annual Premios Juventud (Youth Awards) were broadcast by Univision on July 16, 2015.

== Winners and nominees ==
=== Music ===
La Combinación Perfecta	Lo Toco Todo
"Bailando" - Enrique Iglesias ft. Gente de Zona & Descemer Bueno; "Yo también" - Romeo Santos ft. Marc Anthony; "Qué tiene fe malo" - Calibre 50 ft. El Komander; "Mi Verdad" - Maná ft. Shakira; "El Perdón" - Nicky Jam & Enrique Iglesias	Quiero ser tu dueño - Luis Coronel; Alegre y enamorado - El Dasa; El karma - Ariel Camacho y Los Plebes del Rancho; Farruko Presents los menores - Farruko; Sex and Love - Enrique Iglesias
Voz del Momento	La Más Pegajosa
Luis Coronel; Ariel Camacho y Los Plebes Del Rancho; Larry Hernández; Prince Royce; Romeo Santos	"Bailando" - Enrique Iglesias ft. Gente de Zona & Descemer Bueno; "Ay Vamos" - J Balvin; "Cuando la miro" - Luis Coronel; "El karma" - Ariel Camacho y Los Plebes del Rancho; "El Perdón" - Nicky Jam & Enrique Iglesias; "Te metiste" - Ariel Camacho y Los Plebes del Rancho
El Súper Tour	Canción Corta-venas
Sex and Love Tour - Enrique Iglesias; Cambio De Piel Tour - Marc Anthony; De Líder A Leyenda VIP Tour - Yandel; Vol. 2 Tour - Romeo Santos; Soy el Mismo Tour - Prince Royce; Viaje Tour - Ricardo Arjona	"Perdón" - Camila; "Como quiero odiarte" - Favela; "Ojalá que te vaya mal" - Larry Hernández; "Te metiste" - Ariel Camacho y Los Plebes del Rancho; "Vas A Querer Volver" - Maite Perroni
Mi video favorito	Mi ringtone favorito
"Bailando" - Enrique Iglesias ft. Gente de Zona & Descemer Bueno; "Como tiene que ser" - Arcángel; "Cuando la miro" - Luis Coronel; "Tenerte" - Luis Coronel; "Yo también" - Romeo Santos & Marc Anthony	"Bailando" - Enrique Iglesias ft. Gente de Zona & Descemer Bueno; "Ay Vamos" - J Balvin; "Cuando la miro" - Luis Coronel; "Dímelo Papi -Tamo' Activo" - Fainal, Sara Tunes and Nicky Jam; "El Karma" - Ariel Camacho y Los Plebes del Rancho; "Vas A Querer Volver" - Maite Perroni
Mi letra favorito	Mi artista Regional Mexicano
"Contigo" - Calibre 50; "El hilito" - Romeo Santos; "Lo poco que tengo" - Ricardo Arjona; "Mi verdad" - Maná & Shakira; "Perdón" - Camila; "¿Porqué la engañé?" - Espinoza Paz	Luis Coronel; Ariel Camacho y Los Plebes Del Rancho; El Dasa; Gerardo Ortiz; Julión Álvarez; Larry Hernández
Mi artista Pop/Rock	Mi artista Tropical
Enrique Iglesias; Alejandra Guzmán; Becky G; Camila; Maná; Ricky Martin	Prince Royce; Chino y Nacho; Juan Luis Guerra; Marc Anthony; Romeo Santos; Víctor Manuelle
Mi artista Urbano	Revelación juvenil
Pitbull; Daddy Yankee; Farruko; J Balvin; Nicky Jam; Wisin	Remmy Valenzuela; Cheyo Carrillo; Eli Jas; Johnny Sky; Jonatán Sánchez; Laritza Bacallao; Matisse; Rolf Sanchez; Sofía Reyes; Yunel Cruz
Favorite HitMaker	Favorite Hit
Beyonce; Austin Mahone; Drake; Katy Perry; Taylor Swift	"Shower" - Becky G; "Blank Space" - Taylor Swift; "Stuck on a Feeling" - Prince Royce & Snoop Dogg; "Thinking Out Loud" - Ed Sheeran; "Uptown Funk" - Mark Ronson & Bruno Mars

=== Television ===
Mi Protagonista Favorito	Mi Protagonista Favorita
Jorge Salinas - Mi corazón es tuyo; Cristián de la Fuente - Quiero amarte; Daniel Arenas - La gata; David Zepeda - Hasta el fin del mundo; Mark Tacher - Que te perdone Dios	Silvia Navarro - Mi corazón es tuyo; Maite Perroni - La gata; Marjorie de Sousa - Hasta el fin del mundo; Paulina Goto - Mi corazón es tuyo; Zuria Vega - Que te perdone Dios
Mejor Tema Novelero
"Aunque ahora estés con él" - Calibre 50; "La malquerida" - Cristian Castro, Jesús Navarro & Melissa Robles; "Mi corazón es tuyo" - Kaay and Axel; "Te amaré" - Alejandro Fernández; "Vas A Querer Volver" - Maite Perroni

=== Movies ===
¡Qué Actorazo!	Actriz Que Se Roba La Pantalla
William Levy; Antonio Banderas; Gael García Bernal; Jaime Camil; Mauricio Ochmann	Jennifer López; Aislinn Derbez; Kate Del Castillo; Salma Hayek; Sofía Vergara
Película Más Padre
The Boy Next Door; Addicted; A la mala; McFarland; Spare Parts

=== Sports ===
Deportista de Alto Voltaje	La Nueva Promesa
Javier "Chicharito" Hernández; Cristiano Ronaldo; James Rodríguez; Guillermo "Memo" Ochoa; Lionel Messi	Jesús "El Tecatito" Corona; Carlos Correa; Héctor Herrera López; Jürgen Damm; Miguel Sano
