= Si Alguna Vez =

2015 song by Thalía

Single by Thalía
- Released: October 23, 2015
- Recorded: 2015
- Genre: Latin pop
- Length: 3:20
- Label: Sony Music Latin
- Songwriters: Thalía, Lalo Murguía, Mauricio Arriaga

Thalía singles chronology
"Sólo Parecía Amor" (2015)	"Si Alguna Vez" (2015)	"Desde Esa Noche" (2016)

Lyric video
- "Si Alguna Vez" on YouTube

"Si Alguna Vez" (English: If Sometime) is a song by Mexican singer-songwriter Thalía. The song served as the official theme for the telenovela Antes muerta que Lichita. It was released by Sony Music Latin on October 23, 2015.

== Background and release ==
The song was released onto all digital platforms on October 23, 2015. The song marked Thalía's return to telenovelas after 16 years as the song was the official theme for Antes muerta que Lichita.

== Reception ==
The song was well received by music critics, being nominated for Best Musical Theme at the 2016 TVyNovelas Awards and Premios Juventud. This was Thalía's first nomination for a TvyNovelas Awards since 2000.

== Video ==
The song does not have an official music video, however Thalía released an audio video on her YouTube channel on October 27, 2015 and an official lyric video on November 8, 2015.

== Accolades ==
The song was nominated for Best Theme Song at the TVyNovelas Awards and Premios Juventud.

Year	Award	Category	Nominated	Result
2016	TVyNovelas Awards	Best Musical Theme	Si Alguna Vez	Nominated
2016	Premios Juventud	Best Theme Novelero	Si Alguna Vez	Nominated
