= Senda prohibida (2023 TV series) =

- Genre: Drama
- Based on: Senda prohibida by Fernanda Villeli
- Developed by: Leticia López Margalli
- Written by: Leticia López Margalli; Laura Sosa; Nayura Aragón
- Directed by: Juan Pablo Blanco; Gustavo Ron
- Starring: Ela Velden; Raúl Méndez; Iliana Fox; Plutarco Haza; José Manuel Rincón; Esteban Soberanes; Danny Perea; Luz María Zetina
- Narrated by: Mayrín Villanueva
- Theme music composer: Jordi Bachbush
- Country of origin: Mexico
- Original language: Spanish
- No. of seasons: 3
- No. of episodes: 21

Production
- Executive producers: Carla Gómez; Vincenzo Gratteri; Giselle González
- Producer: Julieta de la O
- Editors: Irving Rosas; Gabriela Torres
- Camera setup: Multi-camera
- Production company: TelevisaUnivision

Original release
- Network: Vix
- Release: 23 June – 15 September 2023

Senda prohibida is a Mexican streaming television series produced by Giselle González for TelevisaUnivision. It is based on the 1958 Mexican telenovela of the same name, created by Fernanda Villeli. It stars Ela Velden, Raúl Méndez and José Manuel Rincón. The series premiered on Vix on 23 June 2023. The second and third seasons premiered on 15 September 2023.

== Premise ==
The series follows Nora (Ela Velden), an ambitious woman who starts a rivalry between a father and son in order to get the luxurious life she has always wanted.

== Cast ==
=== Main ===
- Ela Velden as Nora López Jiménez / Corina
- Raúl Méndez as Federico Rubio
  - Miguel Revelo as young Federico
- Iliana Fox as Irene Rubio
  - Luz Mireya Velasco as young Irene
- Plutarco Haza as Raymundo Corrales
- José Manuel Rincón as Roberto Rubio
- Esteban Soberanes as Enrique
- Danny Perea as Clementina
- Luz María Zetina as Clara

=== Recurring and guest stars ===
- Concepción Márquez as Francisca
- Bernardo Flores as Julio
- Dalexa Meneses as Martha Rubio
- Fabián Corres as Rafael
- Armando Hernández as Ceferino
- Alfredo Huereca as Eladio
- Mayrín Villanueva as the narrator of the series
- Susana Zabaleta as Bolero singer
- Oka Giner as Silvia Derbez
- Armando Espitia as Cosme
- Fernanda Rivas as Chabela
- Bruno Romagnoli as Pablo
- Luis Casan as Mariano
- Sebastián Maltrana as Gerardo
- Rafa Farías as Sergio
- Alberto Yáñez as Bonifacio
- Óscar Treviño as El Rojo
- Eduardo Victoria as Carlos Cueva
- Mario Morán as Ernesto
- Leticia Calderón as TV wife
- Patricia Reyes Spíndola as TV mother
- Erik Rubín
- Alexander Acha
- Edison Ruiz as Serrano
- Mario Escalante as Ochoa
- Alexis Ayala as Lawyer
- María León as Singer
- Paulina de Labra as Cuca

== Episodes ==
Series	Episodes	Originally released
1	7	23 June 2023
2	8	15 September 2023
3	6	15 September 2023

=== Season 1 (2023) ===
No. overall	No. in season	Title	Original release date
1	1	"El destino tiene mil ojos"	23 June 2023
2	2	"Bodas de agua"	23 June 2023
3	3	"Mentiras que matan"	23 June 2023
4	4	"De mi pasado preguntas todo"	23 June 2023
5	5	"Lazos de sangre"	23 June 2023
6	6	"Sortilegio de amor"	23 June 2023
7	7	"Perfidia"	23 June 2023

=== Season 2 (2023) ===
No. overall	No. in season	Title	Original release date
8	1	"Puro teatro"	15 September 2023
9	2	"El olvido"	15 September 2023
10	3	"Incertidumbre"	15 September 2023
11	4	"Ay, corazón..."	15 September 2023
12	5	"Pecados capitales"	15 September 2023
13	6	"¿Verdad o mentira?"	15 September 2023
14	7	"Secretos"	15 September 2023
15	8	"La caja de pandora"	15 September 2023

=== Season 3 (2023) ===
No. overall	No. in season	Title	Original release date
16	1	"Entre las almas..."	15 September 2023
17	2	"Traición"	15 September 2023
18	3	"Prisioneros"	15 September 2023
19	4	"El desengaño"	15 September 2023
20	5	"Infames"	15 September 2023
21	6	"Perdona nuestras ofensas..."	15 September 2023

== Production ==
On 16 February 2022, the series was announced as one of the titles for TelevisaUnivision's streaming platform Vix. On 8 August 2022, it was announced that filming of the series had begun.

== Release ==
The series premiered on Vix on 23 June 2023. The second and third seasons premiered on 15 September 2023
