= Antes muerta que Lichita =

Mexican telenovela

- Genre: Telenovela
- Created by: Pedro Armando Rodríguez
- Written by: Humberto Robles; Alejandra Romero Meza; Héctor Octavio Valdés; Pedro Armando Rodríguez
- Screenplay by: Pedro Armando Rodríguez
- Story by: Jordi Arencón; Marta Azcona; Covadonga Espeso; Ariana Martín
- Directed by: Benjamín Cann; Rodrigo Hernández
- Creative director: Florencio Zavala
- Starring: Maite Perroni; Eduardo Santamarina; Arath de la Torre; Ingrid Martz; Chantal Andere; Manuel "Flaco" Ibáñez; Luz Elena González; Macaria; Gabriela Platas
- Narrated by: Maite Perroni
- Theme music composer: Eduardo Murguía; Mauricio Arriaga; Thalía
- Opening theme: "Si Alguna Vez" by Thalía
- Country of origin: Mexico
- Original language: Spanish
- No. of seasons: 1
- No. of episodes: 131

Production
- Executive producer: Rosy Ocampo
- Producers: Eduardo Meza; María Alba Espinosa
- Cinematography: Daniel Ferrer; Alejandro Álvarez Ceniceros
- Editors: Pablo Peralta; Víctor Mollinedo Arias
- Camera setup: Multi-camera
- Production company: Televisa

Original release
- Network: Canal de las Estrellas
- Release: August 24, 2015 – February 21, 2016

Related
- El amor no es como lo pintan

Antes muerta que Lichita, (English title: Anything but Plain)(More literally, I'd Rather be Dead Than Lichita) is a Mexican telenovela produced by Rosy Ocampo for Televisa.

== Plot ==
Lichita (Maite Perroni) has been working at Iconika Ad Agency for 10 years but feels undervalued and invisible. She decides to make a change and transforms herself from the office “whipping girl” into the empowered Alicia. However, no climb to the top is ever easy and, along the way, she faces situations that test her character and values.

== Production ==
Production of Antes muerta que Lichita officially started on May 18, 2015. The telenovela was formerly known as Más canija que ninguna. It will be the first telenovela in 4K resolution format produced by Televisa.

=== Webnovela ===
During the Univision Upfront, it was confirmed that Antes muerta que Lichita, it will have its own webnovela, which can be seen in the same telenovela and by the Televisa website.

== Cast and characters ==
=== Main characters ===
- Maite Perroni as Alicia Gutiérrez López / Lichita, she is the assistant of Elías and other entrepreneurs of Icónika.
- Eduardo Santamarina as Augusto de Toledo y Mondragón, he is the general president of Icónika.
- Arath de la Torre as Roberto Duarte, he is a fake journalist who reaches Icónika order to obtain a high position in the company.
- Ingrid Martz as Luciana de Toledo y Mondragón, she is the niece and later revealed as the biological daughter of Augusto.
- Chantal Andere as Sandra Madariaga, she is the chief executive officer of Icónika.
- Manuel "Flaco" Ibáñez as Ignacio "Nacho" Gutiérrez, he is the father of Lichita and Magos.
- Luz Elena González as Jesusa “Chuchette”
- Macaria as Fátima
- Gabriela Platas as Beatriz Casablanca de Toledo y Mondragón

=== Recurring characters ===
- Pablo Valentín as Gumaro
- Roberto Blandón as Rafael De Toledo y Mondragón
- Sherlyn as Magos, she is the younger sister of Lichita.
- Eddy Vilard as Alejandro de Toledo y Mondragón Casablanca, he is the son of Augusto and Beatriz, and hides to the world that he is gay for fear of bullying.
- Patricio Borghetti as Néstor Acosta, he is the "account executive" in Icónika.
- Ricardo Fastlicht as Elías Merchant, he is the creative director general of Icónika.
- Felipe Nájera as Marcelo
- Mónica Ayos as Valeria Iribarren
- Wendy González as Brisa Pacheco, she is the art director in Icónika.
- Diego de Erice as Braulio Moncada, he is the "account executive" in Icónika.
- Ana Paula Martínez as Ximena Gutiérrez López
- Vanessa Díaz as Dafne De Toledo y Mondragón Casablanca
- Patricio de la Garza as Mateo Duarte Uribe
- Jana Raluy as Venus Rodríguez
- Luis Ramón Orozco as El vigilante
- Carla Cardona as Martha
- Ilse Ikeda as Ivonne
- Rebeca Gucón as Ivette
- Oswaldo Zárate as Gerardo "El Gerrys"
- Estrella Solís as Paula
- Ivan Nevelitchki as Draco
- Sylvia Pasquel as Elsa López de Gutiérrez, she is the mother of Lichita and Magos.

=== Guest stars ===
- Roberto Sen as Héctor Ontiveros
- Fernando Larrañaga as Agente de la API #3
- José María Negri as Macario Santillana
- Roberto D'Amico as Agente de la API #2
- Gonzalo Peña as Ángel
- Mark Tacher as Luis Altamirano
- Gabriel Soto as Santiago de la Vega
- Patricia Navidad as Marlene Garbo
- Dominika Paleta as Sheyla

== Awards and nominations ==
Year	Award	Category	Nominated	Result
2016	TVyNovelas Awards	Best Telenovela of the Year	Rosy Ocampo	Nominated
2016	TVyNovelas Awards	Best Lead Actress	Maite Perroni	Won
2016	TVyNovelas Awards	Best Lead Actor	Arath de la Torre	Nominated
2016	TVyNovelas Awards	Best Female Antagonist	Ingrid Martz	Nominated
2016	TVyNovelas Awards	Best Male Antagonist	Eduardo Santamarina	Nominated
2016	TVyNovelas Awards	Best Leading Actress	Silvia Pasquel	Nominated
2016	TVyNovelas Awards	Best Leading Actor	Manuel "Flaco" Ibáñez	Nominated
2016	TVyNovelas Awards	Best Co-star Actress	Chantal Andere	Nominated
2016	TVyNovelas Awards	Best Co-lead Actor	Pablo Valentín	Nominated
2016	TVyNovelas Awards	Best Supporting Actress	Luz Elena González	Nominated
2016	TVyNovelas Awards	Best Supporting Actor	Ricardo Fastlicht	Nominated
2016	TVyNovelas Awards	Best Young Lead Actress	Wendy González	Won
2016	TVyNovelas Awards	Best Young Lead Actor	Diego de Erice	Nominated
2016	TVyNovelas Awards	Best Female Revelation	Ana Paula Martínez	Nominated
2016	TVyNovelas Awards	Best Musical Theme	"Si Alguna Vez" (Thalía)	Nominated
2016	TVyNovelas Awards	Best Original Story or Adaptation	Pedro Armando Rodríguez, Alejandra Romero Meza, Humberto Robles and Héctor Valdés	Nominated
2016	TVyNovelas Awards	Best Direction of the Camaras	Benjamín Cann and Rodrigo Zaunbos	Nominated
2016	TVyNovelas Awards	Best Cast	—N/a	Nominated
2016	TVyNovelas Awards	Best Telenovela multi-platform	—N/a	Won
2016	Premios Juventud	Favorite Actor	Arath de la Torre	Nominated
2016	Premios Juventud	Favorite Actress	Maite Perroni	Won
2016	Premios Juventud	Best Theme Novelero	"Si Alguna Vez" - (Thalía)	Nominated

== Mexico broadcast ==
Timeslot (ET/PT)	No. of episodes	Premiered		Ended	
Timeslot (ET/PT)	No. of episodes	Date	Premiere Ratings	Date	Finale Ratings
Monday to Friday 8:20PM	131	August 24, 2015	18.4	February 21, 2016	—N/a
