= Vas a querer volver =

Single by Maite Perroni

from the album Eclipse de Luna
- Released: 27 May 2014
- Genre: Latin pop; bachata
- Length: 3:54
- Label: Warner Music
- Songwriters: Eduardo Murguia; Mauricio Arriaga
- Producer: Koko Stambuk

Maite Perroni singles chronology
"Eclipse de luna" (2013)	"Vas a querer volver" (2014)	"Todo lo que soy" (2014)

Music video
- "Vas A Querer Volver" on YouTube

"Vas a querer volver" is a song by Mexican singer Maite Perroni, released as the third single from the deluxe edition of her solo debut album, Eclipse de Luna.

The song is the main theme of the Mexican telenovela La Gata, where Perroni was the protagonist. The song was released on 27 May 2014, and Perroni performed it for the first time on 10 July in the official presentation of the telenovela. The song belongs to the genre of bachata.

== Charts ==
Chart (2014)	Peak position
Mexico Español Airplay (Billboard)	6
Mexico Airplay (Billboard)	13
US Latin Pop Songs (Billboard)	19

== Awards and nominations ==
Year	Award	Category	Result
2015	Juventud Awards	Best Theme Novelero	Nominated
