= Wendy González =

Mexican actress (born 1985)

- Born: Wendy González; August 17, 1985 (age 41); Monterrey, Nuevo Leon, Mexico
- Occupation: Actress
- Years active: 1999–present

Wendy González (born August 17, 1985) is a Mexican actress. She is best known for her main role in the series Como dice el dicho and her role as co-protagonist in the telenovela Antes muerta que Lichita.

== Filmography ==
=== Films ===
Year	Title	Role	Notes
2006	Bienvenido paisano	Asunción	
2014	Prax: un niño especial	Cristina	Short film

=== Television ===
Year	Title	Role	Notes
1999	Nunca te olvidaré	Child Esperanza Gamboa Martel	Recurring role
2000	Siempre te amaré	Jazmín Elizondo	Recurring role
2003	Clap, el lugar de tus sueños	Jazmin	Recurring role
2004	Misión S.O.S. aventura y amor	Mónica Espino	Recurring role
2005	Vecinos	Tatiana San Román / Daria	"La vampira bonita" (Season 1, Episode 3); "Noche de Halloween" (Season 1, Episode 18)
2006–07	Amor mío	Violeta Sinclair	Recurring role; 42 episodes
2007	Objetos perdidos	Host	Archive footage "Objeto 5" (Season 1, Episode 5)
2008	La rosa de Guadalupe	Rosa	Episode: "Promesas incumplidas"
2009	Sortilegio	Paula Samaniego	Recurring role
2010	Cuando me enamoro	Adriana Beltrán	Recurring role; 46 episodes
2011–14	Como dice el dicho	Isabel León	Lead role; 276 episodes
2015–16	Antes muerta que Lichita	Brisia	Co-lead role
