= Federico Ayos =

Argentine actor

- Born: May 22, 1992 (age 34); Buenos Aires, Argentina
- Education: Televisa Arts Education Center
- Occupation: Actor
- Years active: 2000; 2013–present
- Mother: Mónica Ayos
- Relatives: Diego Olivera (stepfather)

Federico Ayos (born May 22, 1992, Buenos Aires, Argentina) is an Argentine actor, best known for his role Santiago in Televisa's telenovela Corazón que miente (2016), and Emiliano in La candidata (2016). Subsequently, he got a recurring role in the first season of the telenovela Mi marido tiene familia. Federico is the son of actress Mónica Ayos, and stepson of actor Diego Olivera. He studied acting at the Televisa Arts Education Center, together with Ela Velden, whom he had dated from 2016-2018.

== Filmography ==
Television roles
Year	Title	Roles	Notes
2000	Los Iturralde	Federico	Recurring role; 38 episodes
2013–2014	La rosa de Guadalupe	Vidal Elías	Episode: "Tan linda como el sol II" Episode: "Recobrar nuestra vida"
2014	Mi corazón es tuyo	Unknown role	Recurring role; 11 episodes
2014–2015	Como dice el dicho	Mauricio Rodrigo	Episode: "Apuesta ilegal" Episode: "El que se enaltece"
2016	Corazón que miente	Santiago	Series regular; 62 episodes
2016–2017	La candidata	Emiliano	Series regular; 59 episodes
2017	Mi marido tiene familia	Bruno	Series regular (season 1); 72 episodes
2019	Por amar sin ley	Julio	Recurring role (season 2); 8 episodes
2019	El Dragón: Return of a Warrior	El Flaco	Recurring role (season 1); 33 episodes
2019–2020	Médicos	Rafael Calderón	
2021	Te acuerdas de mí	Gastón Cáceres	
2022	Amor dividido	Gabriel Núñez	
2023	Pienso en ti	Omar Miranda	
