= María Antonieta Gutiérrez =

Venezuelan telenovelas screenwriter

- Occupation: Script writer
- Parent: María Antonieta Gómez

María Antonieta "Calú" Gutiérrez is a Venezuelan telenovelas screenwriter. After starting her career in her home country, she moved to Mexico to adapt classic novels, also known as rose novels, in modern versions for Televisa. She is considered as a disciple of Carlos Romero and Alberto Gómez.

== Personal life ==
Gutiérrez is the daughter of the screenwriter María Antonieta Gómez.
