= Maite Perroni =

Mexican actress and singer

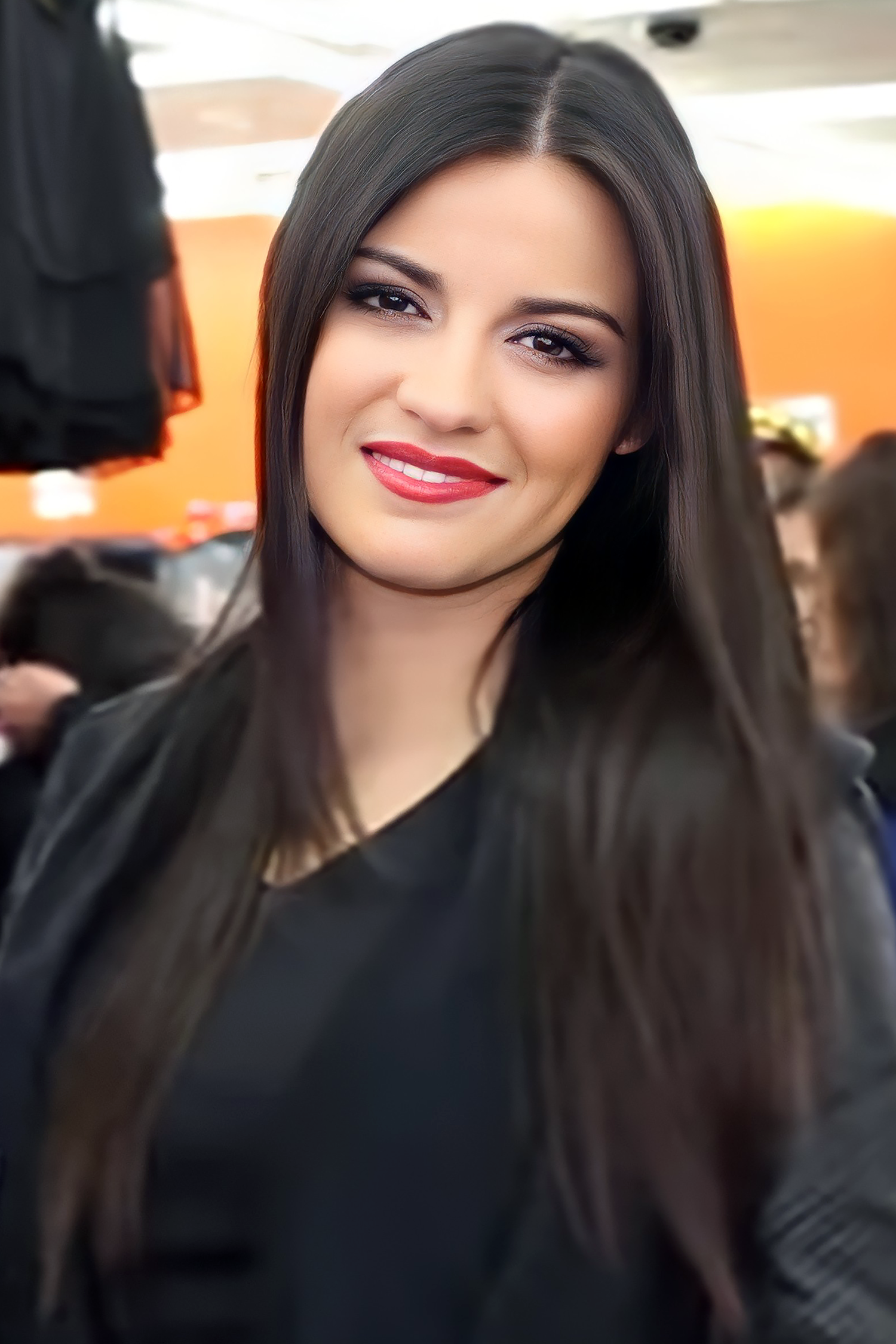
- Born: Maite Perroni Beorlegui; 9 March 1983 (age 43); Mexico City, Mexico
- Occupations: Actress; singer; songwriter; producer
- Years active: 2004–present
- Spouse: Andrés Tovar (m. 2022)
- Children: 1
- Musical career
- Genres: Latin pop; Bachata
- Instruments: Vocals; piano
- Label: Warner
- Formerly of: RBD
- Website: maiteperroni.world

Maite Perroni Beorlegui (born 9 March 1983) is a Mexican actress, singer, songwriter, and producer. She gained international fame in 2004 after starring in the Mexican youth telenovela Rebelde, which launched the pop-rock group RBD, nominated for a Latin Grammy.

As an actress, Perroni's career began in 2004, and she has since starred in numerous television series. She gained acclaim in 2009 when she was named "The New Queen of Telenovelas" by Univision. In 2016, she won the Premios TVyNovelas for Best Actress for her work in Antes muerta que Lichita. She has also starred in the Netflix series Dark Desire and Triada, portraying triplets in the latter. She has also lend her voice to the Huevos franchise since its third film, voicing the character Di. Perroni also provided the voice for the Tooth Fairy in the Latin American Spanish dub of the 2012 DreamWorks Animation film Rise of the Guardians.

In 2012, Perroni signed a contract with Warner Music Group and the following year released her debut solo album Eclipse de Luna (2013), which debuted at number 3 on the AMPROFON chart, the main table of Mexican albums, and peaked at numbers nine and two on the Billboard Top Latin Albums and Latin Pop Albums charts, respectively.

== Biography ==
=== Early life ===
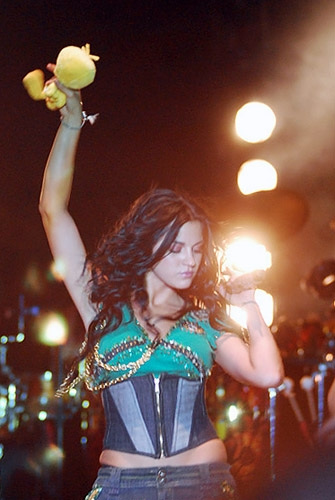
Perroni in 2008.

Maite Perroni Beorlegui was born in Mexico City but grew up in Guadalajara until 1995, when her family moved back to Mexico City. She has two younger brothers, Adolfo (born in 1986) and Francisco (born in 1992). In early childhood, Perroni had an inclination towards acting and appeared in many TV commercials and in some music videos. In school she was involved in acting, art, singing and dancing.

She also participated as a dancer in a Disney Channel show. After graduating from high school, Perroni signed up for the Centro de Educación Artística (CEA), an acting school run by Televisa, and signed up for a three-year course, though it only took her two years to complete. She graduated and landed the role Guadalupe "Lupita" Fernandez, in the Mexican telenovela Rebelde. She was one of the six protagonists alongside Anahí, Dulce María, Christian Chávez, Alfonso Herrera, and Christopher von Uckermann. The series lasted three seasons.

Through the musical group she was a part of, RBD, she is a recording artist, performing sold-out concerts throughout Brazil, Mexico, Spain and Ecuador. Her first solo album, Eclipse de Luna, was released on the Warner Brothers label in August 2013, and was considered a commercial success. It quickly climbed to number 3 on the Mexican Albums Chart and number 2 on the Billboard Latin Pop Albums chart.

In 2014, she launched her own clothing line, known as Colección Maite Perroni. She has hosted prestigious awards shows such as the 2015 "Lo Nuestro Awards" and "The 25th Annual Hispanic Heritage Awards Ceremony." She has 8 million followers on Facebook, over 4 million on Twitter, more than 9 million on Instagram, and more than 2 million YouTube subscribers.

During the 2010s, Maite voiced the lead roles in the Spanish language versions of several movies such as the DreamWorks movie "El Origen de los Guardianes" (Rise of the Guardians) being "El Hada de los Dientes" (Tooth Fairy), Nahuala Film's "Selección Canina" (K9 World Cup) as "Maite Terranova" and Huevocartoon's "Un gallo con muchos huevos" (Huevos: Little Rooster's Egg-cellent Adventure) as "Di".

Maite's TV career began when she starred in the telenovela (soap opera) "Rebelde". From the show came the musical group RBD, which featured Maite as a lead singer. She helped carry the group to worldwide recognition and acclaim; they won several awards including "Best Group of the Year," "Best album of the Year," "Best Concert," and "Best Song of the Year." RBD has sold over 50 million records and entirely sold venues such as "Estadio Maracaná" in Brazil, Madison Square Garden in New York, L.A. Coliseum, American Airlines Arena in Miami, Estadio Vicente Calderón in Spain, Auditorio Nacional and Palacio de los Deportes in Mexico City among others.

Her popularity was cemented in 2008 when she was selected by Mexico's youth to become one of the first Latin women to have an iconic Barbie doll fashioned after her. The Maite Perroni Barbie was a success in Mexico, elsewhere in Latin America, the United States, and Spain.

Perroni has won numerous awards including the Tvynovelas Award's "Best Young Actress" for the soap opera, "Cuidado con el Ángel" (Don't mess with an Angel), Tvynovelas Award's "Most Popular Social Media Artist 2011", "Alta Inspiration Award 2016" by Alta Med, Tvynovelas Award's "Best Actress in a Leading Role" and "Favorite Leading Actress" at the "Premios Juventud 2016" both for the soap opera "Antes Muerta Que Lichita" (Anything But Plain).

She released her first solo album in 2013, entitled "Eclipse de Luna" (Moon Eclipse). The release of the music video for the album's first single, "Tu y Yo" was during the "Premios Juventud 2013" (2013 Youth Awards), which aired on Univision and was seen by over 13 million viewers. The CD reached No. 2 on the U.S. Latin Pop Charts.

In July 2016, she released a new single, Adicta. Its official video has over 7.5 million views on YouTube. During that year she also won numerous music awards such as "Best Latin Female Artist / Best Latin Female Video - Adicta" at the "Latin Music Italian Awards 2016" and "Latin Artist of the Year" by "La Caja de Música" in Spain.

Renowned for her beauty, Maite was selected to be among the top ten of the "100 Most Beautiful Faces 2016" by TC Candler - the only Mexican on the list for 5 years in a row. She has also made "The 50 Most Beautiful People in the World" list by People Magazine En Español for 8 years running. Maite has been an ambassador for the brand Proactiv in the U.S. Hispanic market for a long time.

Maite is fluent in Spanish and English. She is an Ambassador for PADF, an organization with the mission of raising awareness and combatting child labor. Variety picked Maite as one of the "Top 10 Latinas to Watch" in 2015 Maite is a longtime time Brand Ambassador for Proactiv in the U.S. Hispanic market.

She also has a record deal with Warner Music.

== Career ==
=== Acting career ===
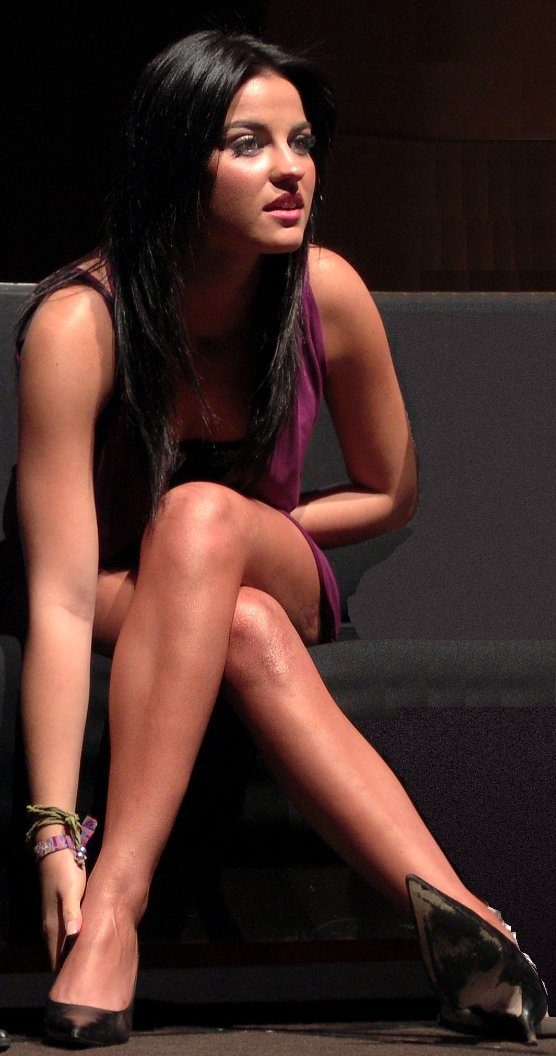
Perroni in 2006.

Perroni made her acting debut starring in Rebelde, a remake of the acclaimed Argentine novela Rebelde Way. She portrayed Guadalupe "Lupita" Fernández, a teenage girl from a lower-class family who gets the opportunity to study at the fictitious Elite Way School. Rebelde ran from 2004 to 2006, filming 440 episodes.

Following the success of Rebelde in 2007, Televisa released RBD: La Familia, which starred the members of RBD. The characters of the sitcom were not based on the band's characters in Rebelde, but intended to be similar to the actors' real personalities. RBD: La Familia was the first Mexican show shot entirely in high definition and ran from March 14, 2007, to June 13, 2007, and only lasted 13 episodes.

In 2008, she starred as the lead character in Cuidado con el ángel, opposite William Levy. The show had great success around the world. She starred in her third leading role in Mi Pecado opposite Eugenio Siller. She was part of the third season of Mujeres Asesinas in the sixth episode called Las Blanco, Viudas along with Diana Bracho, Luz Maria Aguilar, and Mark Tacher.

In 2009, Perroni was named the new queen of the telenovelas by Univision.

In 2010, Maite was confirmed to star with her previous co-star, William Levy, in Triunfo del Amor, a remake of the Venezuelan classic Cristal.

In 2012, Perroni was confirmed to star with Pedro Fernandez in Cachito de Cielo, her fifth lead role.

In 2014, it was confirmed that Perroni was to star in her sixth lead role in a telenovela called La Gata along with Daniel Arenas, Erika Buenfil, and Laura Zapata. It aired on May 5, 2014.

On July 12, 2014, People en Español named Perroni the new queen of Mexican telenovelas.

In 2015, Perroni landed her seventh lead role next to Arath De La Torre, called "Antes muerta que Lichita". It became a hit right away in Mexico and the U.S., where she was invited to promote it, as she has a huge fanbase in North America.

Then in 2017, she landed her eighth lead role with Sebastian Rulli, called "Papá a toda madre". More recently, she signed an overall deal with Pantaya.

=== Musical career ===
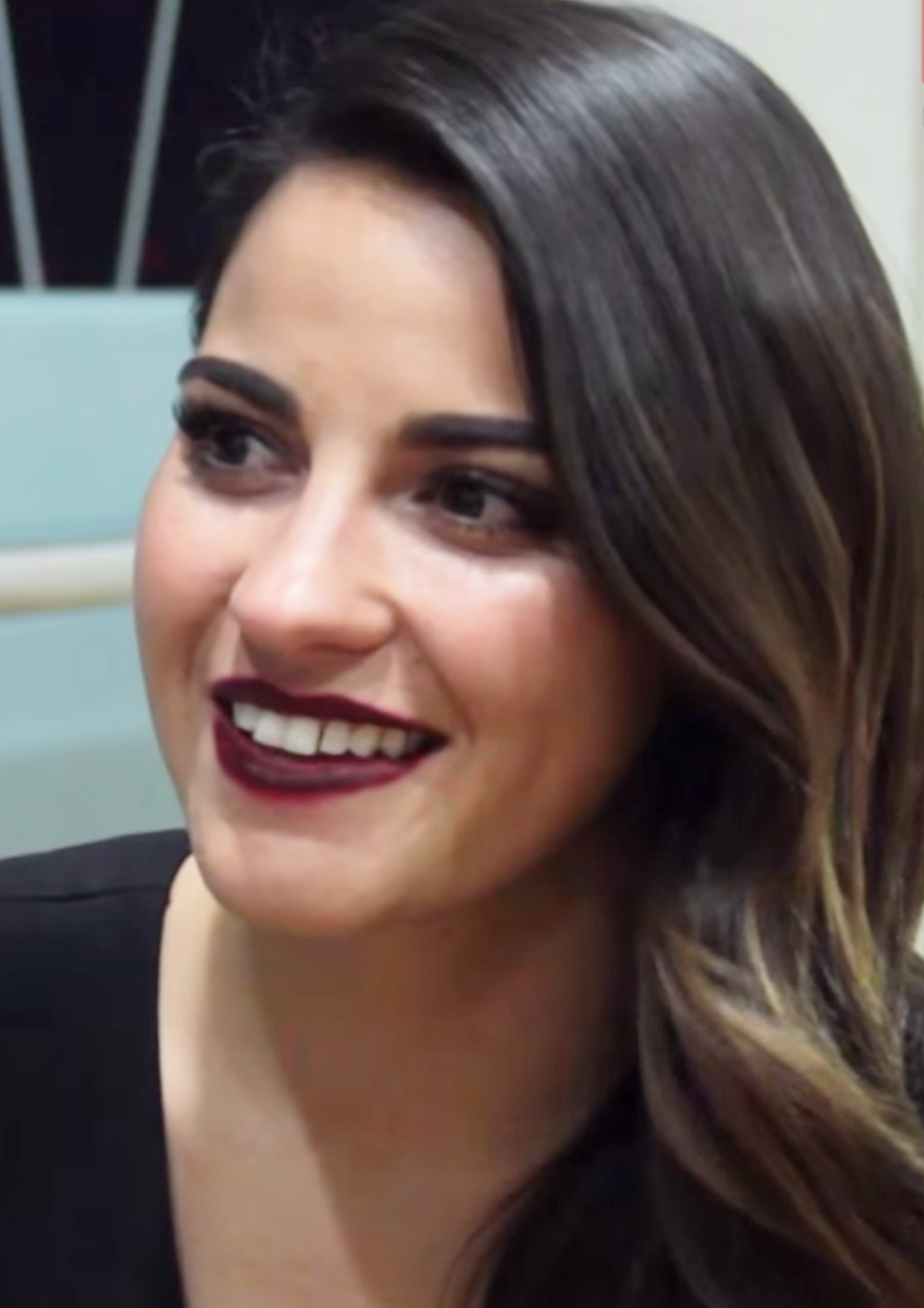
Maite Perroni at International Film Festival in Guadalajara, in March 2016

Perroni was a member of the popular band RBD, which was launched off of the success of the most-watched telenovela in years, Rebelde. To date, RBD has made 9 studio albums, including albums in Spanish, Portuguese, and English. They have sold over 15 million albums worldwide, and have embarked on various international tours including shows throughout Latin America and Europe.

Mai composed "Tal Vez Mañana", for RBD's fourth Spanish language album, Empezar Desde Cero and sang solo on the title track for the album.

On August 8, 2008, RBD released a message telling fans that they had decided to split up. They went on one final tour, Gira Del Adios World Tour, which ended in early 2009. Perroni was absent part of the tour, due to her filming of Cuidado con el ángel.

For her role in Cuidado con el ángel, Perroni recorded three songs for the show called "Esta Soledad", "Separada De Ti", and "Contigo".

She recorded a song with Reik, entitled "Mi Pecado", which was used as the opening song for the telenovela, Mi Pecado.

She recorded a song with Marco di Mauro called "A Partir De Hoy" which forms part of the musical soundtrack of the telenovela Triunfo del Amor, her fourth lead role.

In 2012, Perroni released a single called "Te daré mi corazón" that was used for her telenovela "Cachito de Cielo".

In late 2012, Perroni announced that she will record her first solo album called Eclipse de Luna.

On July 16, 2013, Perroni released a bachata song called "Tu y Yo".

In May 2014, Perroni released another bachata song called "Vas A Querer Volver" which is also the theme song for her soap opera La Gata.

In June 2014, Perroni released a duet song with Alex Ubago called "Todo lo que soy" which was the couple's theme song in the telenovela La Gata.

On July 14, 2016, Perroni released her first single called Adicta. She performed it at Premios Juventud 2016. It will be included in her new album soon to be released.

=== Products and endorsements ===
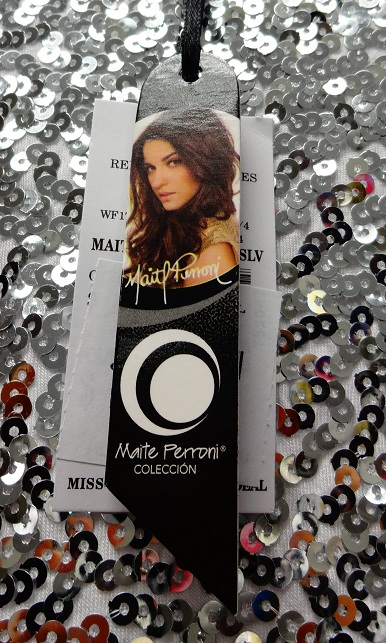
Maite Perroni Coleccion.

Mai is the spokesmodel for NYX Cosmetics. In 2007, a Barbie doll version of Perroni was released based on her character in Rebelde.

In June 2009, Perroni announced her support for the Ecologist Green Party of Mexico.

Mai stars in commercials for Giraffas, Pepsi, Proactiv, Teleton, Pantene, and Coppel.

In fall 2014, Perroni partnered with National Stores to introduce her Coleccion Maite Perroni, a contemporary fashion line inspired by her favorite designers reflecting her own personal taste. "Latinas who accept, love themselves... who want to look good and feel better, who maximize your qualities and analyze the defects you project onto the world...and discover that you love yourself and you are passionate... "And you know how to face life, how to live life, give life and be alive, who are who they are and don't follow stereotypes."

== Personal life ==
Perroni is currently living in Los Angeles, California. She was in a relationship with Chilean musician and producer Koko Stambuk from 2013 to 2020.

In 2021, Perroni began dating producer Andrés Tovar. They announced their engagement in September 2022 and got married on October 9, 2022. On January 6, 2023, Perroni announced she was pregnant with their first child. Their daughter, Lía, was born in May of the same year.

== Discography ==
=== Albums ===
Year	Album details	Peaks				Certifications (sales threshold)
Year	Album details	US Latin	US Latin Pop	MEX AMPROFON TOP100	MEX AMPROFON TOP20 Español	Certifications (sales threshold)
2013	Eclipse de Luna: Release date: August 23, 2013; Label: Warner Music; CD, Digital download	9	2	6	3	

=== Singles ===
Year	Song	Peaks									Album
Year	Song	MEX Monitor Latino	MEX Monitor Latino Pop	MEX Billboard México Airplay	MEX Billboard México Español Airplay	GRE Billboard Digital Songs	COS Monitec	US Latin Pop	US Latin Digital	US Latin Digital Pop	Album
2013	"Tú y Yo"	65	25	9	4	4	1	20	25	12	Eclipse de Luna
2013	"Eclipse de Luna"	122	43	27	12	11	5	—	—	—	Eclipse de Luna
2014	"Vas a Querer Volver"	62	21	13	6	—	3	23	—	19	Eclipse de Luna
2014	"Todo Lo Que Soy" (featuring Alex Ubago)	—	20	24	8	—	4	—	—	—	Eclipse de Luna
2016	"Adicta"	—	17	35	6	—	—	—	—	—	TBA
2017	"Loca" (featuring Cali & El Dandee)	—	14	27	14	—	41	36	—	—	TBA
2018	"Como Yo Te Quiero" (featuring Alexis & Fido)	—	12	36	—	—	—	—	—	—	TBA
2018	"Bum Bum Dale Dale" (featuring Reykon)	—	15	—	—	—	—	—	—	—	TBA

=== Duets ===
Year	Song	Peaks										Album
Year	Song	MEX Monitor Latino	MEX Monitor Latino Pop	MEX Billboard México Airplay	MEX Billboard México Español Airplay	COS Monitec	US Hot Latin Songs	US Latin	US Latin Pop	US Latin Digital	US Latin Digital Pop	Album
2009	Mi Pecado (with Reik)	—	—	—	—	—	—	—	—	—	—	Un Día Más – Edición Especial
2011	A Partir De Hoy (a dueto con Marco Di Mauro)	4	3	2	1	1	44	44	24	29	17	Algo Que Me Faltaba

=== Promotional singles ===
Song	Year	Album
"Te Daré Mi Corazón"	2012	Cachito de Cielo
"Así Soy"	2017	The Greatest Showman

== Filmography ==
=== Films ===
Year	Title	Role	Notes
2012	El arribo de Conrado Sierra	Ninfa	
2014	El Origen de los Guardianes	Tooth Fairy	Voice role; Latin-American Spanish dub
2015	Selección Canina	Maite Terranova	Voice role
2015	Un gallo con muchos huevos	Di	Voice role
2018	Dibujando el cielo	Sofia	
2019	Doblemente embarazada	Cristina	Also producer
2020	Un rescate de huevitos	Di	Voice role
2021	Sin ti no puedo	Blanca	Lead role
2022	Huevitos congelados	Di	Voice role
2024	El roomie	Daniela	

=== Television ===
Year	Title	Role	Notes
2004	Rebelde	Guadalupe "Lupita" Fernández	Main role; 439 episodes
2007	RBD: La familia	Mai	Main role; 13 episodes
2007	Lola, érase una vez	"The New Cinderella"	1 episode
2008	Cuidado con el ángel	María de Jesus "Marichuy" Velarde	Lead role
2009	Mi pecado	Lucrecia Córdoba Pedraza de Huerta	Lead role
2010	Mujeres asesinas	Estela Blanco	Episode: "Las Blanco, Viudas"
2010	Triunfo del amor	María Iturbide Gutiérrez de Sandoval	Main role
2012	Cachito de cielo	Renata Landeros De Franco	Main role
2014	La Gata	Esmeralda "La Gata" / Renata de la Santa Cruz	Main role
2015	Antes muerta que Lichita	Alicia "Lichita" Gutiérrez López	Main role
2017	Papá a toda madre	Renée Sánchez Moreno	Main role
2019–2021	El juego de las llaves	Adriana "Adri" Romero	Main role; 18 episodes
2020	Herederos por accidente	Lupita "Lu" Marques	Main role; 13 episodes
2020	Cómo sobrevivir soltero	Herself	Episode 7: "Romcom"
2020–2022	Dark Desire	Alma Quintana Solares	Main role; 33 episodes
2022	¿Quién mató a Sara?	Alma Quintana Solares	Episode 3: "Viva o Muerta"
2023	Tríada	Rebecca Fuentes / Aleida Trujano / Tamára Sanchez (identical triplets)	Main role

== Achievements ==
=== TVyNovelas Award ===
3 wins out of 10 nominations and 1 special award

Year	Category	Nominated	Result
2009	Best Young Lead Actress	Cuidado Con El Ángel	Won
2010	Best Young Lead Actress	Mi Pecado	Nominated
2012	Best Lead Actress	Triunfo del Amor	Nominated
2012	Musical Theme	"A Partir de Hoy" (with Marco DiMauro)	Nominated
2012	Award of most influential		Recipient
2015	Best Lead Actress	La Gata	Nominated
2016	Best Lead Actress	Antes muerta que Lichita	Won
2018	Best Lead Actress	Papá a toda madre	Won
Favoritos del público
2013	The Prettiest	Cachito de cielo	Nominated
2013	Favorite Couple (with Pedro Fernández)	Cachito de cielo	Nominated
2013	Favorite Kiss (with Pedro Fernández)	Cachito de cielo	Nominated

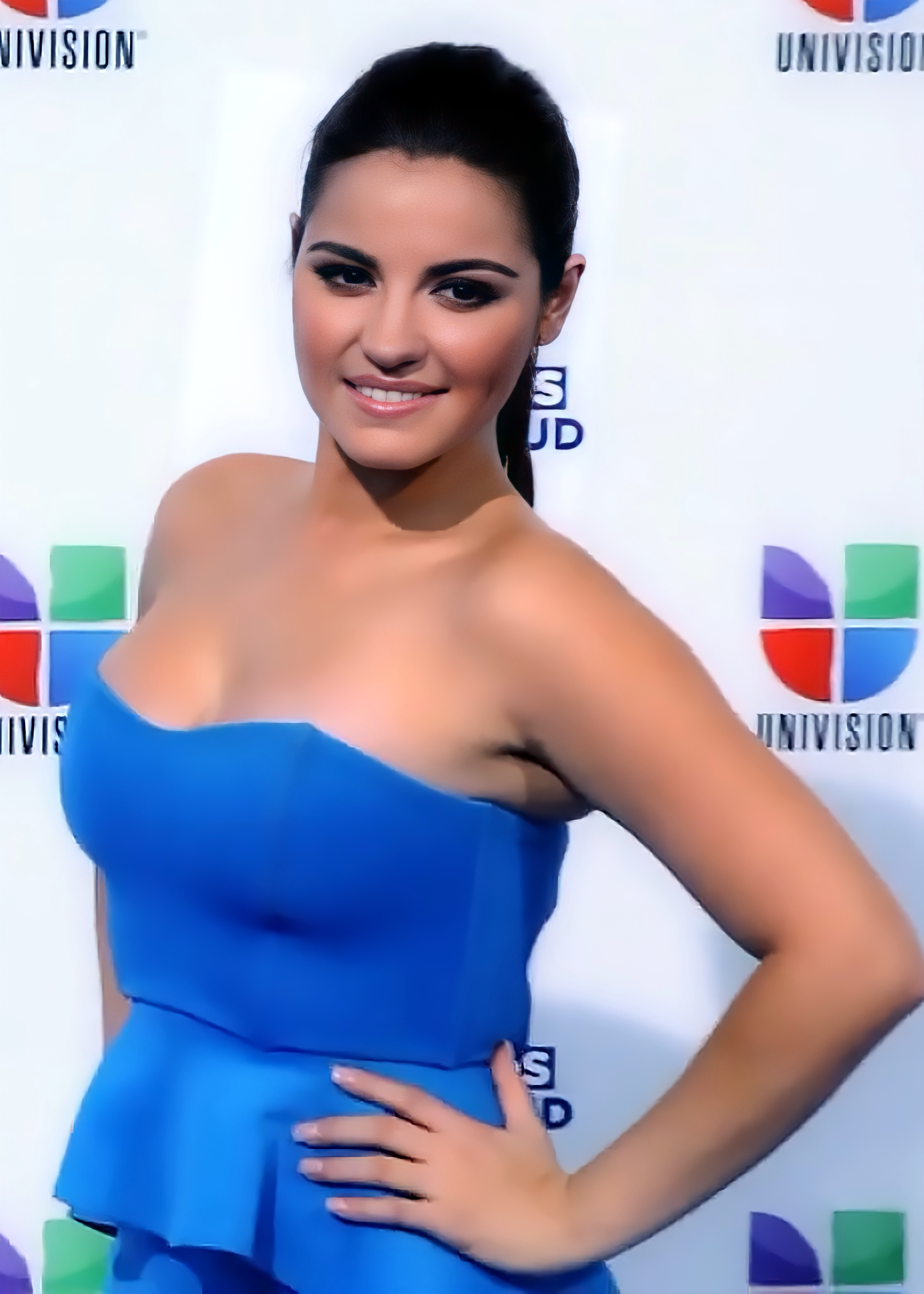
Maite Perroni at 2011 Premios Juventud

=== Premios Juventud ===
3 wins out of 11 nominations

Year	Category	Nominated	Result
2008	The Girl of My Dreams	RBD: La Familia	Nominated
2009	She's Got Style	Herself	Nominated
2009	The Girl of My Dreams	Cuidado Con El Ángel	Won
2010	The Girl of My Dreams	Mi Pecado	Nominated
2011	The Girl of My Dreams	Triunfo del Amor	Won
2014	The Girl of My Dreams	Cachito de Cielo	Nominated
2015	Favorite Actress	La Gata	Nominated
2015	Best Theme Novelero	"Vas A Querer Volver"	Nominated
2016	Favorite Actress	Antes muerta que Lichita	Won
2016	Actress Who Steals the Show	Un Gallo con Muchos Huevos	Nominated
2016	Best Fans	Perronitos	Nominated
2022	Me Enamoran (with Alejandro Speitzer)	Oscuro Deseo	Pending

=== People en Español Award ===
2 wins out of 16 nominations

Year	Category	Nominated	Result
2009	Best Actress	Cuidado con el ángel	Nominated
2009	Best Couple (with William Levy)	Cuidado con el ángel	Nominated
2010	Best Actress	Mi Pecado	Nominated
2010	Best Couple (with Eugenio Siller)	Mi Pecado	Nominated
2010	Best Young Lead Actress	Mi Pecado	Nominated
2011	Best Actress	Triunfo del Amor	Nominated
2011	Best Couple (with William Levy)	Triunfo del Amor	Won
2012	Queen of Twitter	Maite Perroni	Won
2013	Album of the Year	Eclipse de Luna	Nominated
2013	Song of the Year	"Tú y Yo"	Nominated
2013	Music Video of the Year	"Tú y Yo"	Nominated
2013	Best New Artist	Maite Perroni	Nominated
2013	The Most Beautiful Instagram	Maite Perroni	Nominated
2014	Best Couple (with Daniel Arenas)	La Gata	Nominated
2014	Best Actress	La Gata	Nominated
2014	Best Theme Song	"Vas a Querer Volver"	Nominated

=== Kids' Choice Awards Mexico ===
0 wins out of 3 nominations

Year	Category	Nominated	Result
2013	Favorite Actress	Cachito de Cielo	Nominated
2013	Favorite Voice from an Animated Movie	El Origen de los Guardianes	Nominated
2014	Favorite Actress	La Gata	Nominated

=== Estilo DF ===
1 win out of 1 nomination

Year	Category	Nominated	Result
2014	Artist With Best Style	Herself	Won

=== GQ Men of the Year Awards ===
1 win out of 1 nomination.

Year	Category	Nominated	Result
2020	Mexican Actress of the Year	Oscuro Deseo	Won

=== People en Español's 50 Most Beautiful ===
12 consecutive years: 2008–2019

== Tours ==
Tours
Year	Title
2010	Maite Perroni Brazilian Tour 2010
2013–15	Eclipse de Luna Tour
2016–18	Tour Love
2018	Maite Perroni Live Tour
