= Muchacha italiana viene a casarse (2014 TV series) =

2014 Mexican telenovela

- Genre: Telenovela
- Based on: Muchacha italiana viene a casarse by Delia González Márquez
- Written by: María Cervantes Balmorí; Luis Mariani
- Screenplay by: Mario Iván Sánchez; Mariana Palos; Rocío Lara
- Directed by: Pedro Damián; Juan Carlos Muñoz; Luis Pardo
- Creative director: Alexis Covacevich
- Starring: Livia Brito; José Ron; Enrique Rocha; Fernando Allende; Isela Vega; Salvador Pineda; Maribel Guardia; Lourdes Munguía; Francisco Gattorno; Nailea Norvind
- Theme music composer: Eduardo Magallanes; Mario Molina Montes
- Opening theme: "A dónde va nuestro amor" by Playa Limbo
- Country of origin: Mexico
- Original language: Spanish
- No. of seasons: 1
- No. of episodes: 176

Production
- Executive producer: Pedro Damián
- Producer: Luis Luisillo
- Production locations: Maratea, Italy; Naples, Italy; Televisa San Ángel; Mexico City
- Cinematography: Salvador Ortega
- Editors: Martin Fuentes Wilchis; Noé Galindo; Yuri Murúa
- Camera setup: Multi-camera
- Production company: Televisa

Original release
- Network: Canal de las Estrellas
- Release: October 20, 2014 – June 21, 2015

Related
- The Stray Cat; Amor de barrio; Muchacha italiana viene a casarse (1971)

Muchacha italiana viene a casarse (English: Italian Bride) is a Mexican telenovela produced and directed by Pedro Damián for Televisa. It is a remake of the 1971 Mexican telenovela Muchacha italiana viene a casarse.

Livia Brito and José Ron star as the protagonists, while Nailea Norvind and Mike Biaggio star as the antagonists of the telenovela.

On October 20, 2014, Canal de las Estrellas began airing "Muchacha Italiana viene a casarse" weekdays at 4:15 p.m., replacing La gata. The series finale aired in Mexico on June 21, 2015. Two alternative endings for the telenovela were available for streaming on the telenovela's official site following its finale. It started airing weeknights on August 25, 2015 on Univision.

== Plot ==
Hoping to get medical care for her sister, Gianna, who suffers from a heart condition, Fiorella Bianchi, a recently orphaned Italian woman, moves to Mexico and accepts a marriage proposal from her late father's deceptive, but wealthy friend. After her fiance abandons the sisters, Fiorella works as a maid for the prominent Ángeles family, where she falls in love with Pedro Ángeles, a man whose family legacy is based on mysterious circumstances.

== Background and production ==
Pedro Damián announced his intention to produce a remake of Muchacha italiana viene a casarse in the spring of 2014. Casting for the telenovela was conducted from May through July in Mexico City. In July and early August, Eleazar Gomez, José Pablo Minor, Jessica Coch, and newcomer Ela Velden were among some of the first actors to be confirmed for the telenovela. Irán Castillo was previously attached to the project, but later dropped out, citing health-related concerns. Livia Brito and José Ron were officially confirmed as the protagonists on August 18, 2014.

=== Filming ===
Production officially began on August 25, 2014. Brito, Ron, and Velden filmed scenes and promotional spots in Maratea, Italy for two weeks. The cast began filming in Mexico City in early September. Livia Brito and Ela Velden studied Italian in order to more accurately portray their roles.

Production in Mexico City ended in late April 2015. In early May 2015, Brito, Ron, Velden, Isela Vega, Maribel Guardia, Fernando Allende, and José Pablo Minor traveled to Maratea, Naples, and other Italian locations, including a beach in Cersuta, where they spent time filming the telenovela's finale. Production was officially completed on May 12, 2015 in Italy. The cast returned to Mexico City in late May.

=== Promotion ===
On October 6, 2014, the cast participated in a Tibetan Buddhist prayer ceremony, which was also attended by the Italian ambassador to Mexico, Alessandro Busacca. On October 15, 2014, the cast, crew, and a promotional trailer, featuring exclusive new scenes, were presented to media in a special event at Televisa San Ángel; it was streamed live for fans on the telenovela's official website.

== Cast ==
=== Main ===
| Actor | Character |
|---|---|
| Livia Brito | Fiorella Bianchi |
| José Ron | Pedro Ángeles |
| Enrique Rocha | Vittorio Dragone |
| Fernando Allende | Sergio Ángeles |
| Isela Vega | Eloísa Ángeles |
| Salvador Pineda | Dante Dávalos |
| Maribel Guardia | Julieta |
| Lourdes Munguía | Joaquina |
| Francisco Gattorno | Aníbal Valencia |
| Nailea Norvind | Federica Ángeles |

=== Supporting ===
| Actor | Character |
|---|---|
| Ela Velden | Giana Bianchi |
| José Pablo Minor | Gael Ángeles |
| Eleazar Gómez | Benito Segura |
| Paula Marcellini | Roxana Rivera |
| Ricardo Blume | Mario Bianchi |
| Raquel Garza | Adela de Segura |
| César Bono | Reynaldo Segura |
| Claudio Baez | Máximo Ángeles |
| Mike Biaggio | Osvaldo Ángeles |
| Mimi Morales | Sonia Ángeles |
| Jessica Coch | Tania Casanova |
| Vanesa Restrepo | Alina |
| Irina Baeva | Katia |
| Sol Mendez Roy | Diana Alarcón |
| Arturo Garcia Tenorio | Fidel |
| Alicia Encinas | Libia Alarcón |
| Dobrina Cristeva | Belinda |
| Candela Márquez | Aitana de la Riva |
| Carmen Rodríguez | Celeste de la Riva |
| José Antonio Barón | Benigno de la Riva |

== Mexico broadcast ==
| Timeslot (ET/PT) | No. of episodes | Premiered | | Ended | |
| Timeslot (ET/PT) | No. of episodes | Date | Premiere Ratings | Date | Finale Ratings |
|---|---|---|---|---|---|
| Monday to Friday 4:15PM | 176 | October 20, 2014 | 18.1 | June 21, 2015 | 15.4 |

== Awards and nominations ==
| Year | Award | Category | Nominated | Result |
|---|---|---|---|---|
| 2015 | Kids Choice Awards México | Favorite Actor | Eleazar Gómez | Nominated |
| 2015 | Kids Choice Awards México | Favorite Actress | Livia Brito | Nominated |
| 2015 | Kids Choice Awards México | Favorite Revelation | Ela Velden | Nominated |
| 2015 | Kids Choice Awards México | Favorite Program or Series | Muchacha italiana viene a casarse | Nominated |
