= Muchacha italiana viene a casarse (1971 TV series) =

Mexican telenovela

- Genre: Telenovela
- Created by: Fernanda Villeli; Marissa Garrido
- Written by: Luis Reyes de la Maza
- Story by: Delia González Márquez
- Directed by: Alfredo Saldaña; Ernesto Alonso
- Starring: Ricardo Blume; Angélica María
- Opening theme: "A dónde va nuestro amor" by Angélica María
- Country of origin: Mexico
- Original language: Spanish
- No. of episodes: 209

Production
- Executive producer: Ernesto Alonso
- Production company: Televisa

Original release
- Network: Canal de las Estrellas
- Release: August 30, 1971 – 1972

Related
- Muchacha italiana viene a casarse (2014)

Muchacha italiana viene a casarse (Italian Girl Comes to Get Married) is a 1971 Mexican telenovela by Televisa produced by Ernesto Alonso and directed by Alfredo Saldaña, starring Angélica María and Ricardo Blume. Writing credits belong to Delia González Marquez (original story), Fernanda Villeli (adaptation), Marissa Garrido (adaptation), Miguel Sabido (adaptation) and Carlos Lozano Dana (adaptation)

The series featured two theme songs: "A dónde va nuestro amor" and "Lo que sabemos del amor". Both songs were written by Eduardo Magallanes and performed by Angélica María.

== Plot ==
Valeria and Gianna Donatti live happily in Naples with their father, until he suddenly gets ill and dies. The sisters must then travel to Mexico City to meet with Vittorio Maglione, Valeria's fiancé . Valeria and Vittorio have never met since their marriage was arranged by her parents; so the two have no idea of what they look like. Believing Valeria will never arrive, Vittorio (the impatient fool he is) stops waiting.

Valeria and Gianna arrive in Mexico and are lost in the city, when they get robbed and are practically on the street. At nightfall, the concierge of a luxury apartment complex lets them stay in her room. Finally Valeria and Vittorio meet but she is disappointed because he is an old man. Valeria decides not to marry him and looks for a cleaning job to make a living. departments and friend Sylvia ago Gianna falls ill and the doctor says Valeria need expensive treatment, while Sylvia commits suicide and leaves power Valeria a letter.

Valeria reads the letter and decides to use it against Juan Francisco de Castro to blackmail him and make him marry her to pay for treatment of her sister, as Juan Francisco was the lover of Sylvia, same portraying him as responsible for his suicide. Before reaching Juan Francisco, Valeria finds work in a couple's house very good people, and Teresa Vicente, who become friends and recommend Valeria Castro home.

After working at Juan Francisco, Valeria holds its plan and likewise discovers the opposition and enmity of Mercedes grandmother, cousin Eduardo and the wife of this, apart from Elena and Joseph Butler sinister mansion knows all the secrets of the old Mercedes and becomes the same helper in the task of removing Valeria their lives, Dulce cook becomes the mainstay of Valeria addition to Fanny, a friend of the family who discovers Valeria is the result of a love he had when he was admitted to a school in Naples. While Juan Francisco lives by Valeria resentful toward blackmail, gradually discovers that Valeria is the love of his life. The same applies to Valeria, who stops seeing Juan Francisco as a stranger and goes really falling for him.

== Main cast ==
- Angélica María - Valeria Donatti
- Ricardo Blume - Juan Francisco de Castro
- Isabela Corona - María Mercedes de Castro
- Celia Castro - Fanny Iglesias del Campo
- Miguel Manzano - Vicente
- Nelly Meden - Analia de Castro
- Aarón Hernán - Patricio de Castro
- Silvia Pasquel - Gianna Donatti
- Rafael Banquells - Joseph
- Hortensia Santoveña - Teresa #1
- Alicia Montoya - Teresa #2
- María Rubio - Elena Harrington
- Socorro Avelar - Dulce
- Eduardo Alcaraz - Vittorio Maglione
- Héctor Gómez - Eduardo
- Javier Ruán - Héctor
- Magda Guzmán - Analia
- Lucía Méndez - Raquel
- Daniela Rosen - Cecilia
- César del Campo - Ricardo
- Martha Zavaleta - Carmen
- Alfonso Meza
- Héctor Flores - Chato
- Susana Dosamantes
- Ernesto Gómez Cruz - Humberto
- José Antonio Ferral - Jaime
- Atilio Marinelli - Príncipe Andrés de Orsini
- Joaquín Arizpe - Pedro
- Ignacio Rubiel - Nacho
- Raymundo Capetillo
- Cristina Moreno - Silvia
- Hector Saez - Luis Alberto

== Additional cast members ==
Martha Zavaleta, Alfonso Meza, Héctor Flores, Lucía Méndez, Susana Dosamantes, Ernesto Gómez Cruz, Daniela Rosen, Atilio Marinelli, Héctor Gomez, Javier Ruan, Magda Guzmán and Hortensia Santoveña.

== Original version ==
- Muchacha italiana viene a casarse (1969, Argentina, Teleteatro) with Alejandra Da Passano and Rodolfo Ranni.

== Remakes ==
There have been three further remakes of "Muchacha italiana viene a casarse", which are:

- Esa Provinciana (1983, Argentina) with Camila Perisé and Juan José Camero.
- Victoria (1987, Mexico) with Victoria Ruffo and Juan Ferrara.
- Muchacha italiana viene a casarse with Livia Brito and Jose Ron.
