= Patricio Castillo (actor, born 1940) =

Mexican actor (1940–2021)

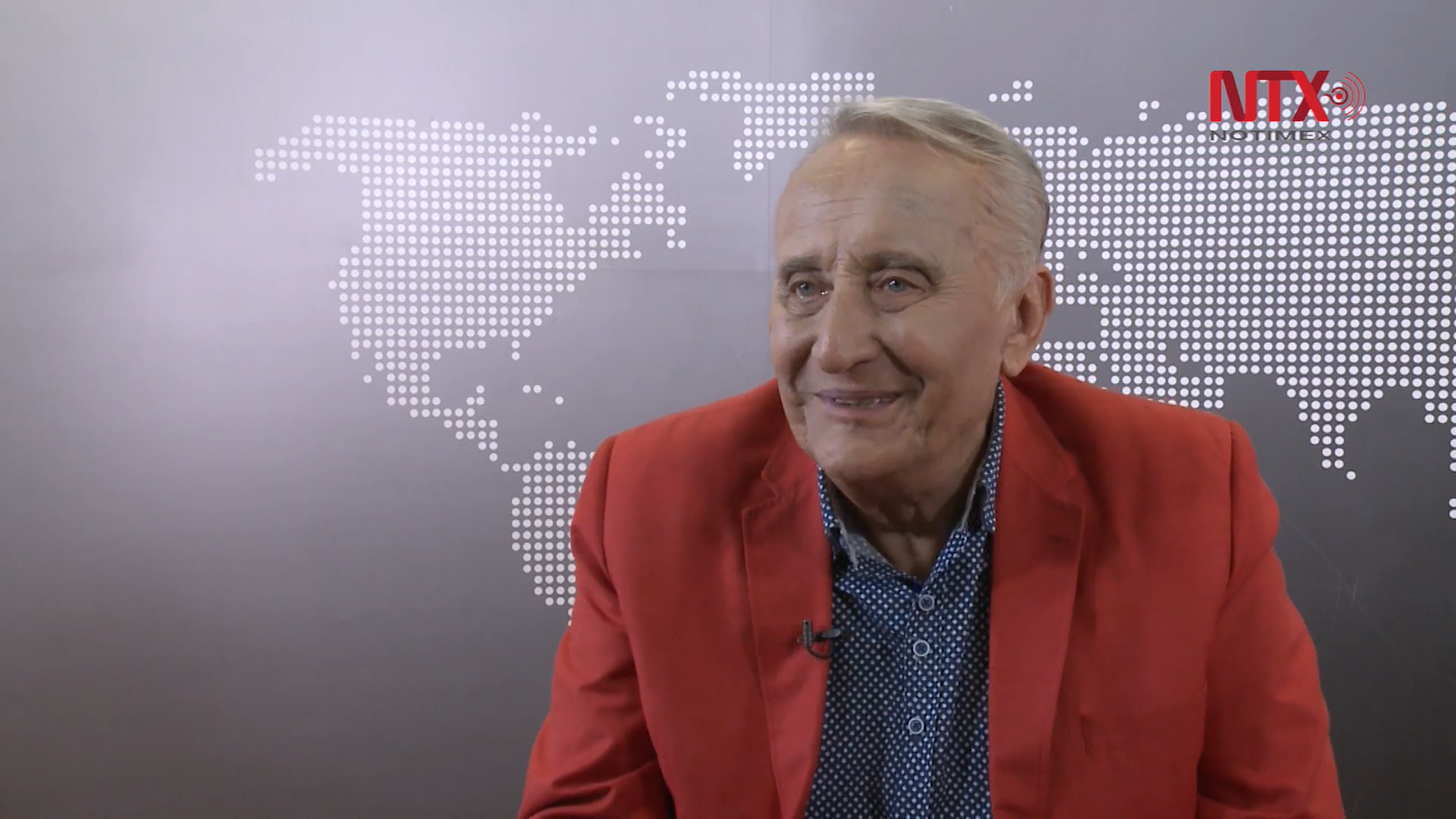
Patricio Castillo, 2019

Jaime García Márquez Patricio Castillo San Juan, better known as Patricio Castillo (18 November 1940 – 15 April 2021) was a Chilean born Mexican actor.
