= Lourdes Reyes =

Mexican television actress and singer (born 1972)

- Born: María Lourdes Reyes Barragán; June 15, 1972 (age 54); San Luis Potosí City, San Luis Potosí, Mexico
- Occupation: Actress
- Years active: 1987–present

Lourdes Reyes (born María Lourdes Reyes Barragán on June 15, 1972 in San Luis Potosí City, San Luis Potosí, Mexico) is a Mexican television actress and singer. She is the daughter of Jesus Reyes and Lourdes Barragan. Lourdes is active in television and social activism.

== Biography ==
Lourdes began her singing career in 1987, participating in a local musical group of San Luis Potosi. In 1991, she participated in Valores Juveniles Bacardi & Cia.

== Career ==
Lourdes television debut was in 1993, acting in some episodes of Televiteatros. She subsequently enters the Centro de Educación Artística de Televisa (CEA), where she graduated in 1994. In 1998, Lourdes is cast in the telenovela Camila, playing the character of 'Selene Olivares'. Later the same year, she appears in the melodrama Sin ti. A year later Lourdes joined the cast of ¿Qué nos pasa? and the telenovela Por tu amor.

In 2000, Lourdes was called to appear in two telenovelas: Amigos x siempre and Por un beso. Between 2001 and 2004, she recorded more than 10 episodes of the series Mujer casos de la vida real. In 2003 Lourdes gave life to 'Rocio' in the children's telenovela De pocas, pocas pulgas. In 2004 she stars in the film comedy Dos tragedia, along actress Rosa Maria Bianchi. Sueños y caramelos (2005) is the soap opera in which Lourdes replaces Adriana Fonseca as 'Melissa' due to Fonseca being indiscipline. That same year, she also entered the cast of Piel de otoño, sharing credits with Laura Flores and Sergio Goyri. In 2006, Lourdes was part of the cast of the teen telenovela of the moment, Rebelde, where she played the role of the teacher 'Julia Lozano'. In January 2007, Lourdes ventured into the world of driving with the Metrópolis program, broadcast by 4TV, sharing credits with Laisha Wilkins and Verónica del Castillo, among others.

For 2008, Lourdes was called by producer, MaPat Lopez de Zatarain, to participate in the telenovela Juro que te amo, starring as the antagonistic couple next to Alexis Ayala. In 2011 Lourdes had a small role in the telenovela Ni contigo ni sin ti. In 2012, she joined the infamous series and at the end enlivens Ilse in La mujer de Vendaval. Lourdes also participated in the soap opera Las trampas del deseo and the second season of Señora de Acero.

Lourdes returned to Mexican melodramas in 2016 with the telenovela Corazón que miente, playing "Rafaela", one of the main antagonists, with Thelma Madrigal, Pablo Lyle, Diego Olivera, Dulce María, and Alejandro Tommasi.

Recently, Lourdes participated with a starring character in the production of Carlos Moreno Laguillo, Mujeres de negro, playing Rita and sharing credits with once again with Mayrín Villanueva, Diego Olivera, Alexis Ayala with Alejandra Barros and Ximena Herrera.

== Filmography ==
=== Television roles ===
Year	Title	Role	Notes
1995	María la del Barrio	Sylvia	
1996	Confidente de secundaria	Renata	
1997	Sin ti	Ángeles	
1998–99	Camila	Selene Olivares	77 episodes
1999	Por tu amor	María Fernanda "Marifé" Cifuentes Álvarez	
2000	Amigos x siempre	Melissa Escobar	
2000	Por un beso	Estela Hidalgo	
2001–05	Mujer, casos de la vida real	Various roles	19 episodes
2003	De pocas, pocas pulgas	Rocío	
2005	Sueños y caramelos	Selene de Monraz	
2005	Piel de otoño	Claudia Lambarri	
2006	Rebelde	Julia Lozano	
2008–09	Juro que te amo	Malena de Fregoso	140 episodes
2009	Mujeres asesinas	Diana Alvarado	Episode: "Tita Garza, estafadora"
2009	Los simuladores	Elisa	Episode: "Fin de semana"
2010–12	La rosa de Guadalupe	Ana / Leticia / Atenas	3 episodes
2011	Como dice el dicho	Unknown role	Episode: "Cara de beato"
2011	Ni contigo ni sin ti	Doctora	2 episodes
2012	Infames	Yalda Adam	
2012	Capadocia	Nuria Arjona	4 episodes
2012–13	La mujer del Vendaval	Ilse Sánchez	75 episodes
2013	Las trampas del deseo	Roberta Jáuregui	Episode: "Pilot"
2015–17	Señora Acero	Cayetana Roca	Recurring role
2016	Dios Inc.	Miriam	11 episodes
2016	Corazón que miente	Rafaela	68 episodes
2016	Mujeres de negro	Rita	51 episodes
2017	La doble vida de Estela Carrillo	Luisa	Recurring role
2017	Ingobernable	Sofía	Episode: "Declaration of Independence"
2018	Señora Acero	Cayetana Costa	Recurring role
2019	Dani Who?	Puri Ibáñez	4 episodes
2019	Decisiones: Unos ganan, otros pierden	Valentina	Episode: "Decidí volver "
2020	Vencer el desamor	Josefina Miranda	Recurring Role
2021	SOS me estoy enamorando		
