= Sachi Tamashiro =

Mexican telenovela actress (born 1980)

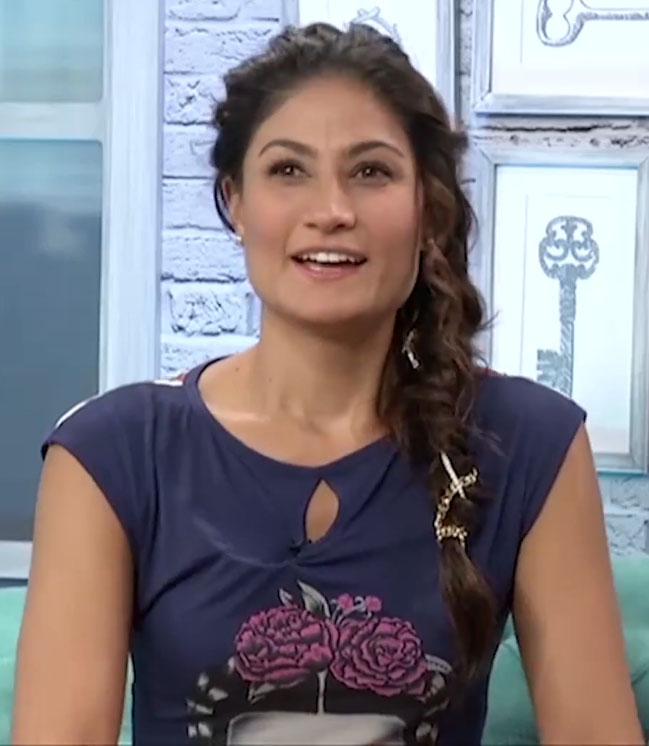
- Sachi Tamashiro in an interview
- Born: April 28, 1980 (age 45); Mexico City, Mexico
- Education: Centro de Educación Artística by Televisa
- Occupation: Actrees
- Years active: 2010–present

Sachi Tamashiro ([ˈsatʃi tamaˈʃiɾo]; born April 28, 1980) is a Mexican telenovela actress.

== Early life ==
Sachi Tamashiro was born on April 28, 1980, in Mexico City, to a father of Japanese origin and a Mexican mother. Initially she worked in international trade in New Zealand. She studied in the Centro de Educación Artística of Televisa.

== Career ==
She appeared in the telenovelas Cuando me enamoro, Ni contigo ni sin ti and Un refugio para el amor. She played July Barbosa in La Mujer del Vendaval.

In 2016, she appeared in Tres veces Ana as Maribel and later starred in Enamorándome de Ramón.

== Filmography ==
Film roles
Year	Title	Roles	Notes
2010	Lo que tu ganas	Scort	Short film

Television roles
Year	Title	Roles	Notes
2010–2015	Parenthood	Amber Hole	Voice role; Spanish dubbing
2011	Ni contigo ni sin ti	Yolanda "Yola" Zorrilla	
2011	Cuando me enamoro	Eulelia	
2011–2015	Como dice el dicho	Julia / Azucena / Luz	4 episodes
2012–2018	Teen Wolf	Lydia Martin	Voice role; Spanish dubbing
2012	Hollywood Heights	Melissa Sanders	Voice role; Spanish dubbing
2012	Un refugio para el amor	Vicky	
2012–2013	La mujer del Vendaval	July Barbosa	
2014	Por siempre mi amor	Unknown character	Episode: "Gran final: Part 2"
2014–2015	La sombra del pasado	Dolores	
2016	Tres veces Ana	Maribel	
2017	Enamorándome de Ramón	Margarita	
2018	Tenías que ser tú	Joaquina "Jaquie"	
2020	Te doy la vida	Vicky	
2020–2021	Quererlo todo	Berenice Cabrera	
2021–2022	S.O.S me estoy enamorando	Verónica	
2022	Los ricos también lloran	Dr. Altamira	2 episodes
2023	Vencer la culpa	Susana Ortega	
2024	Fugitivas, en busca de la libertad	Frida Segovia	
2025	La Jefa	Ernestina Guzmán	Main cast

== Awards and nominations ==
Year	Award	Category	Works	Result
2017	35th TVyNovelas Awards	Best Young Lead Actress	Tres veces Ana	Nominated
