= Verano de amor =

Mexican telenovela

- Genre: Telenovela
- Written by: Patricia Maldonado
- Screenplay by: María Balmorí; Alejandra Romero; Pedro Armando Rodríguez
- Story by: Claudio Lacelli; Amparo Iribas; Fidel Chiatto; Marily Pugno; Betina Sancha; José Ierfino
- Directed by: Juan Carlos Muñoz; Luis Pardo
- Creative director: Alexis Covacevich
- Starring: Enrique Rocha; Juan Ferrara; Dulce María; Mark Tacher; Lola Merino; Gonzalo García Vivanco; Victoria Díaz; Cristina Mason; Brandon Peniche; María Elisa Camargo; Pablo Lyle; Natasha Dupeyrón; Carlos Speitzer; Karla Souza; Esmeralda Pimentel; Yago Muñoz; Sharis Cid; Lourdes Canale; Analía del Mar; Felipe Nájera; María Fernanda García; Luz María Jerez; Jorge Ortín
- Theme music composer: Carlos Lara; Pedro Damián
- Opening theme: "El verano" performed by Dulce María
- Country of origin: Mexico
- Original language: Spanish
- No. of seasons: 2
- No. of episodes: 120

Production
- Executive producer: Pedro Damián
- Producer: Luis Luisillo
- Cinematography: Vivian Sánchez Ross
- Editors: Julio Abreu; Juan Franco; Juan José Segundo; Luis Horacio Valdés
- Camera setup: Multi-camera

Original release
- Network: Canal de las Estrellas
- Release: February 9 – July 24, 2009

Verano de amor (English title: Summer of Love) is a Mexican telenovela produced by Televisa. It is a remake of a famous Argentine telenovela, Verano del 98, adapted for the Mexican audience. It premiered on February 9, 2009, and ended on July 24, 2009.

== Plot and themes ==
Verano de amor is the story of four teenagers who have always lived in the city of Tlacotalpan, Veracruz, Mexico. The story's message emphasizes the distinction between the importance of pursuing one's dreams and the importance of pursuing material things. The show's creators chose Tlacotalpan for its setting in large part because of its natural beauty; the storyline of Verano de amor incorporates messages promoting environmentalism, an extension of Televisa's "Televisa Verde" initiative focused on the environment.

== Cast ==
- Dulce María as Miranda Perea Olmos de Villalba
- Gonzalo García Vivanco as Mauro Villalba Duarte
- Christina Masón as Zoé Palma
- Brandon Peniche as Dylan Morett Carrasco
- Pablo Lyle as Baldomero Perea Olmos
- Mark Tacher as Dante Escudero
- Victória Díaz Arango as Flora Palma
- Lola Merino as Sofía Duarte
- Ana Layevska as Valéria Michel
- Enrique Rocha as 'Vito Rocca Provenzano
- Juan Ferrara as Othon Villalba de Limonquí
- Luz Maria Jeréz as Aura De Rocca
- María Fernanda García as Reyna Olmos
- Felipe Nájera as Federico Carrasco
- Sharis Cid as Frida Morett de Carrasco
- Manuel Landeta as Marcos Casar
- Rebeca Manríquez as Zulema Esdregal
- Ariane Pellicer as Adelina Olmos
- Manuel Ojeda as Clemente Matus
- Ari Borovoy as Elías Lobo
- Analía del Mar as Feliciana Clavería
- Lourdes Canale as Etelvina Garcia González
- Juan Carlos Muñóz as Santino Rocca
- Rebeca Mankita as Lina Corvalán
- Jorge Ortín as Adriano Bonfiglio
- Maria Elisa Camargo as Isabela Rocca
- Viviana Macouzet as Jennifer Montili
- Alan Estrada as Fabián Escudero
- Natasha Dupeyrón as Berenice Perea Olmos
- Imanol Landeta as Daniel Gurzan
- Carlos Speitzer as Narciso Sotelo Peréz
- Karla Souza as Dana Villalba Duarte
- Yago Muñoz as Enzo Rocca
- Esmeralda Pimentel as Adalberta Claveria
- Andréa Muñoz as Milena Carrasco
- Manelick de la Parra as Bruno Carrasco
- Alicia Moreno as Sol Montili
- Héctor de la Peña as Rocco Levín
- Martín Barba as Jordí Heidi
- Michelle as Brisa Palma
- Juan José Origel as Bruno Gallaza
- Yessica Salazar as Giovanna Reyes
- Araceli Mali as Fátima Villalobos
- Samantha López as Eugénia Villalobos
- Carmen Rodriguez as Eva Rocca
- Fernando Robles as Donato Vallejo
- Lourdes Munguía as Violeta Palma
- Alejandro Peraza as Custódio Santoscoy
- Rebeca Mankita as Celina Carrasco
- Verónica Jaspeado as Greta Perea Olmos
- Andrea Torre as Sandra Palacios
- Archi Lanfranco as William
- José Carlos Femat as Bobby
- Santiago Toledo as Iván
- Arturo de la Garza as Armando
- Ana Isabel Meraza as Felicitas
- Michelle Renaud as Débora
- Ilse Ikeda as Palmira
- Mónica Blanchet as Virgínia
- Rubén Cerda as Rubén
- Pedro Damián as Benito
- Bruno Danzza as Santos Diablitos
- Patricia Cantú as Paty
- Juan Manuel Puerto as Oso
- José Blanchet as José
- Pope Lopto as Pope
- Axel Valero as Axel
- Mark Batak as Mark

=== Special guests ===
- Christopher Uckermann
- Wisin & Yandel
- Axel
- Paty Cantú

== Theme songs ==
The theme "El Verano" performed by Dulce Maria, is the main theme of the telenovela, which sounds both at the entrance and in the end credits.

As the novel progressed, new themes are introduced, for example: "Light up the world tonight" (by Christopher Uckermann) and "I want my life" (by the fictional band Bikini's).

With the premiere of the second season, also premiered the new song of the telenovela, "Déjame Ser", also starring Dulce María, which is used at the entrance of the telenovela.

== Awards and nominations ==
| Year | Award | Category | Nominated | Result |
|---|---|---|---|---|
| 2009 | Premios People en Español | Mejor Actor/Actriz Juvenil | Dulce María | Won |
| 2009 | Premios People en Español | Mejor Actor/Actriz Juvenil | Gonzalo García Vivanco | Nominated |
| 2009 | Premios Juventud | Chica que me Quita el Sueño | Dulce María | Nominated |
| 2009 | Premios Juventud | La Más Pegajosa | El Verano - Dulce María | Nominated |
| 2010 | Premios TVyNovelas | Mejor actor juvenil | Gonzalo García Vivanco | Nominated |
| 2010 | 4º Voces de Turismo Canadá | Mejor Producción de Televisión | Verano de Amor | Won |
