= Cermeño (surname) =

Cermeño is a surname. Notable people with the surname include:

- Antonio Cermeño (1969–2014), Venezuelan boxer
- Carlos Cermeño (born 1995), Venezuelan footballer
- Fernando Cermeño (born 1980), Spanish actor and model
- Nehomar Cermeño (born 1979), Venezuelan boxer
- Sebastian Rodriguez Cermeño (1560–1602), Portuguese explorer
