= Thelma Madrigal =

Mexican actress

- Born: Thelma Madrigal Gálvez; 31 December 1984 (age 40); Mexico City, Mexico
- Occupation: Actress
- Years active: 2010–2020; 2025–present

Thelma Madrigal (born Thelma Madrigal Gálvez on 31 December 1984) is a Mexican actress, model and ballerina.

== Career ==
Madrigal began her career in television in 2010, in the telenovela Para volver a amar, Mexican version of the Colombian telenovela El último matrimonio feliz, in this project she played Paola González, and thanks to that she was nominated at the 29th TVyNovelas Awards of 2011 in the category Best Female Revelation.

For the year 2011, the producer Luis de Llano Macedo chose her as a youth protagonist in the telenovela Esperanza del corazón, there she played Lisa, a young dancer who helps her mother to get ahead and fight for love and achieve her dreams. The following year she was nominated at the 30th TVyNovelas Awards of 2012 in the category Best Young Lead Actress.

In that same year, she played Nisa Casteló in the telenovela La mujer del Vendaval, Mexican version of the Venezuelan telenovela Un esposo para Estela. And also she participated in an episode of the Mexican series Como dice el dicho. A year later she was nominated again at the 32nd TVyNovelas Awards in the category Best Young Lead Actress for her role of Nisa Casteló.

In 2013, producer Ignacio Sada Madero chose her as the youth protagonist of Por siempre mi amor, adaptation of the 1989 telenovela by Abel Santacruz entitled Mi segunda madre. In 2014, she obtained her first role as a villain, in the telenovela La sombra del pasado, where she shared credits mostly with Pablo Lyle, and Michelle Renaud. She was subsequently nominated again as Best Young Lead actress at the 34th TVyNovelas Awards of 2016.

In 2015, she obtained her first role as the protagonist in the telenovela Corazón que miente, which started production in the same year, and subsequently premiered in 2016. In that project she shared mostly credits again with Pablo Lyle, with whom she had previously worked in Por siempre mi amor, and La sombra del pasado.

In films the actress has only participated in two, The Last Death in 2011, and Fish Bones in 2018.

Although her last project was in 2018, she since 2016 has not participated again in other television projects such as series or telenovelas. She recently confirmed that she moved to Colombia, where she currently lives with her family, and that she would be away from Mexican television for a long period unless it is a project carried out between Colombia and Mexico. In March 2025, it was announced that Madrigal would return to acting in the telenovela Regalo de amor.

== Filmography ==
Television roles and films performance
Year	Title	Roles	Notes
2010–2011	Para volver a amar	Paola González	Main cast; 145 episodes; Nominated—29th TVyNovelas Awards for Best Female Revelation
2011	La última muerte	Lizzy Wilkins	Film
2011–2012	Esperanza del corazón	Lisa Duprís Landa / Mónica	Main cast; 145 episodes; Nominated—30th TVyNovelas Awards for Best Young Lead Actress
2012	Como dice el dicho	Lucy	Episode: "Ahora es cuando chile verde"
2012–2013	La mujer del Vendaval	Nisa Casteló	Main cast; 156 episodes; Nominated—32nd TVyNovelas Awards for Best Young Lead Actress
2013–2014	Por siempre mi amor	Aranza	Main cast; 122 episodes
2014–2015	La sombra del pasado	Valeria	Main cast; 130 episodes; Nominated—34th TVyNovelas Awards for Best Young Lead Actress
2016	Corazón que miente	Mariela	Main role; 70 episodes
2018	Fish Bones	Friend #1	Film; cameo
2020	Operación pacífico	Liliana Neira	4 episodes
2020	De brutas, nada		Episode: "El día que no fue"
2025	Regalo de amor	Ivana	
