= La sombra del pasado =

- Genre: Telenovela
- Screenplay by: Antonio Abascal; Daniel González; Dante Hernández
- Story by: José Cuauhtémoc Blanco; María del Carmen Peña; Víctor Manuel Medina
- Directed by: Mauricio Rodríguez; José Elías Moreno
- Starring: Michelle Renaud; Pablo Lyle; Alexis Ayala; Alejandra Barros; Alfredo Adame
- Music by: Carlos Páramo
- Opening theme: "Te prometí" performed by Manuel Mijares
- Country of origin: Mexico
- Original language: Spanish
- No. of episodes: 136

Production
- Executive producer: Mapat L. de Zatarain
- Producer: Marco Vinicio
- Cinematography: Leonardo Hernández; Óscar Morales; Marco Vinicio
- Editors: Gabriela Torres; Óscar Morales
- Camera setup: Multi-camera
- Production company: Televisa

Original release
- Network: Canal de las Estrellas
- Release: November 10, 2014 – May 17, 2015

Related
- La malquerida; La vecina; El Manantial

La sombra del pasado (English title: Shadows of the Past) is a Mexican telenovela, produced by MaPat López de Zatarain for Televisa. It is a remake of the telenovela written by José Cuauhtémoc Blanco and Víctor Manuel Medina Cervantes El Manantial in 2001.

Michelle Renaud and Pablo Lyle stars as the protagonists, while Alexis Ayala and Alejandra Barros stars as the antagonists. There is a special participation of Susana González and René Strickler, with Alfredo Adame, Manuel "Flaco" Ibáñez and first actress Cynthia Klitbo.

Production of La sombra del pasado officially started on August 18, 2014.

== Plot ==
Two very different families live in the village of Santa Lucía who are involved in a whirlwind of passion, pain, and revenge. The rivaling families are the Mendozas and the Alcocers.

Severiano Mendoza and Candela Santana are a rich and powerful marriage who live at the ranch, "Las Ánimas", along with their young son, Cristóbal. Roberta and Raymundo Alcocer also have a daughter named Aldonza; however, they do not live with the same luxuries as the Mendoza family, which causes frustration and resentment in Roberta as nothing is enough to fill the inferiority complex that follows her like a shadow.

She is in love with her past love, a priest but will need to resist the temptation. She and Severiano will stop at nothing to ruin Aldonza and Cristóbal's love, keeping them apart with their intense family rivalry.

Aldonza and Cristóbal will face many hurdles and deceptions. By the end of the story, they overcome these obstacles and continue their relationship together.

== Cast ==
=== Main ===
- Michelle Renaud as Aldonza Alcocer Lozada de Mendoza
- Pablo Lyle as Cristóbal Mendoza Santana
- Alexis Ayala as Severiano Mendoza
- Alejandra Barros as Candela Santana de Mendoza
- Alfredo Adame as Padre Jerónimo

=== Recurring ===
- Susana González as Roberta Lozada Torres de Alcocer
- Cynthia Klitbo as Prudencia Garduño de Zapata
- René Strickler as Raymundo Alcocer
- Manuel "Flaco" Ibáñez as Melesio Olegario
- Thelma Madrigal as Valeria Zapata
- Alex Sirvent as Emanuel Zapata
- Lisset as Adelina Lozada
- Sachi Tamashiro as Dolores "Lola" Olegario
- Beatriz Moreno as Dominga de Olegario
- Horacio Pancheri as Renato Ballesteros
- Luis Xavier as Humberto Zapata
- Arleth Terán as Isadora
- Diego de Erice as Tomás Garcés
- Aarón Hernán as Padre Sixto
- Fernando Cermeño as Joaquín
- Juan Carlos Nava as Edmundo
- José Carlos Farrera as Abelardo Lagos
- Fernanda López as María de los Ángeles "Mary" Lagos
- Arlette Pacheco as Simoneta Saavedra / Viviana

== Mexico broadcast ==
On November 10, 2014, Canal de las Estrellas broadcast of La sombra del pasado weeknights at 7:15pm, replacing La malquerida. The last episode was broadcast on May 17, 2015, with La vecina replacing it on May 25, 2015, weekdays at 6:10pm.

Timeslot (ET/PT)	No. of episodes	Premiered		Ended	
Timeslot (ET/PT)	No. of episodes	Date	Premiere Ratings	Date	Finale Ratings
Monday to Friday 7:15PM	136	November 10, 2014	20.2	May 17, 2015	—N/a

== Awards and nominations ==
Year	Award	Category	Nominated	Result
2015	Kids Choice Awards México	Favorite Actress	Michelle Renaud	Nominated
2016	Premios TVyNovelas	Best Telenovela of the Year	Mapat L. de Zatarain	Nominated
2016	Premios TVyNovelas	Best Actress	Michelle Renaud	Nominated
2016	Premios TVyNovelas	Best Actor	Pablo Lyle	Won
2016	Premios TVyNovelas	Best Antagonist Actress	Alejandra Barros	Nominated
2016	Premios TVyNovelas	Best Antagonist Actor	Alexis Ayala	Nominated
2016	Premios TVyNovelas	Best Leading Actress	Cynthia Klitbo	Nominated
2016	Premios TVyNovelas	Best Co-lead Actress	Susana González	Won
2016	Premios TVyNovelas	Best Young Lead Actress	Thelma Madrigal	Nominated
2016	Premios TVyNovelas	Best Young Lead Actor	Diego de Erice	Nominated
2016	Premios TVyNovelas	Best Supporting Actress	Beatriz Moreno	Nominated
2016	Premios TVyNovelas	Best Supporting Actor	Manuel "Flaco" Ibáñez	Nominated
2016	Premios TVyNovelas	Best Male Revelation	José Carlos Farrera	Won
2016	Premios TVyNovelas	Best Original Story or Adaptation	Antonio Abascal	Nominated
2016	Premios TVyNovelas	Best Direction	José Elias Moreno	Nominated
2016	Premios TVyNovelas	Best Direction of the Cameras	Marco Vinicio	Nominated
2016	Premios TVyNovelas	Best Musical Theme	"Te prometí" (Manuel Mijares)	Nominated
2016	Premios TVyNovelas	Best Cast	La sombra del pasado	Nominated
