= Quererlo todo =

Mexican telenovela

- Genre: Telenovela
- Based on: Herencia de amor by Enrique Estevanez
- Written by: Antonio Abascal; Carlos Daniel González; Dante Hernández Miranda; Sol Rubí Santillana
- Directed by: Claudia Elisa Aguilar; Sandra Schiffner
- Starring: Michelle Renaud; Danilo Carrera; Víctor González; Sara Corrales; Scarlet Gruber; Alexis Ayala
- Opening theme: "Amantes prohibidos" by El Bebeto
- Country of origin: Mexico
- Original language: Spanish
- No. of seasons: 1
- No. of episodes: 122

Production
- Executive producer: Ignacio Sada Madero
- Producer: Arturo Pedraza L.
- Production company: Televisa

Original release
- Network: Las Estrellas
- Release: 9 November 2020 – 25 April 2021

Quererlo todo (International title: To Want It All) is a Mexican telenovela produced by Ignacio Sada Madero that aired on Las Estrellas from 9 November 2020 to 25 April 2021. It is an adaptation of the Argentine telenovela titled Herencia de amor created by Enrique Estevanez. It stars Michelle Renaud and Danilo Carrera. Production of the series began on 3 August 2020 and concluded on 20 February 2021. The story takes place in a town called "El Rosario", where the Montes family, heirs of "La Noria" farm, will fight fiercely for wealth and power.

== Plot ==
Valeria Fernández (Michelle Renaud) has been the lifelong girlfriend of Leonel Montes (Víctor González) without ever questioning her love for him. After Leonel's father, a wealthy landowner, dies, a war begins between the heirs to the fortune. In the midst of this commotion, Valeria meets Mateo Santos (Danilo Carrera), son of the executor of the inheritance, and will fall in love with his nobility and passion for life.

== Cast ==
- Michelle Renaud as Valeria Fernández Cosío
- Danilo Carrera as Mateo Santos Coronel
- Víctor González as Leonel Montes Larraguibel
- Sara Corrales as Sabina Curiel
- Scarlet Gruber as Sandy Cabrera Tellez
- Alexis Ayala as Artemio Cabrera
- Olivia Bucio as Dalia Coronel de Santos
- Eugenia Cauduro as Esmeralda Santos Coronel
- Luz María Jerez as Minerva Larraguibel
- Roberto Blandón as Tirso Quintero
- Mimi Morales as Magdalena Bustamante
- Juan Ángel Esparza as Father Gabriel
- Claudia Troyo as Luisa Zermeño
- Sachi Tamashiro as Berenice Cabrera Tellez
- Gina Predet as Eva Téllez
- Ignacio Guadalupe as Servando
- Rubén Branco as Remi
- Jorge Gallegos as Basurto
- Lalo Palacios as Lorenzo
- Marcos Moreno as Alejandro Moreno
- Fabiola Andere as Corina
- Enrique Montaño as Juan
- Karen Leone as Camelia
- Nacho Ortiz Jr. as Facundo
- Zoe Itzayana as Angelita
- Alejandro Tommasi as Aarón Estrada

=== Recurring ===
- Mundo Siller as Justino

=== Guest stars ===
- Manuel Ojeda as Patricio Montes
- Mirta Reneé as Amara
- Martín Muñoz as Dr. Flavio
- Eduardo Marbán as Fercho
- Vanessa Mateo as Jessica
- Gregorio Reséndiz

== Ratings ==
Season	Timeslot (CT)	Episodes	First aired		Last aired	
Season	Timeslot (CT)	Episodes	Date	Viewers (millions)	Date	Viewers (millions)
1	Mon–Fri 3:30pm	122	9 November 2020	3.2	25 April 2021	2.6

== Episodes ==
No.	Title	Original release date
1	"La muerte de Patricio Montes"	9 November 2020
Leonel and Valeria arrive surprisingly to La Noria, a visit that unleashes several problems with Patricio just on the day of his wedding with Sabina.
2	"La última voluntad de Patricio Montes"	10 November 2020
The notary announces to the whole family that Dalia will be the executor of Don Patricio's estate under certain conditions. Valeria agrees to stay at the farm with Leonel.
3	"¡Mateo y Valeria casi se besan!"	11 November 2020
Mateo and Valeria pose for a photo shoot in which they must kiss, but Leonel arrives to confront Mateo. Esmeralda hides the money but someone steals it.
4	"¡Secuestran a Valería!"	12 November 2020
Mateo returns to work at La Noria. Artemio blames Lorenzo for Berenice's disappearance. Valeria is kidnapped.
5	"Mateo es herido de muerte"	13 November 2020
Mateo rescues Valeria, but on the run he is confronted by the kidnappers and stabbed. Leonel asks Valeria to return to Mexico City.
6	"¡Mateo besa a Valeria!"	16 November 2020
Mateo hallucinates in the hospital and surprisingly kisses Valeria. Lorenzo asks Angelita to take care of the money he found. Leonel denounces Artemio.
7	"Sandy presiona a Mateo para casarse"	17 November 2020
After seeing him recovered, Sandy demands Mateo to get married as soon as possible. Leonel and Valeria thank Mateo for everything he did for them.
8	"Sabina y Angelita sufren un accidente"	18 November 2020
Sabina finds Patricio's money, steals it and runs away with Angelita, but because she is drunk they have a car accident.
9	"Somos muy distintos"	19 November 2020
Mateo tells Valeria that she is just as self-serving as the Montes. Lorenzo gives the money to Berenice. Leonel kicks out Sabina.
10	"Berenice confiesa su amor al padre Gabriel"	20 November 2020
Father Gabriel seeks out Berenice to find out if it is true that she loves him, she agrees to have feelings for him. Leonel humiliates Valeria during an interview.
11	"¡El cuerpo de Patricio Montes ha desaparecido!"	23 November 2020
12	"Yo soy un asesino"	24 November 2020
13	"Sabina intenta seducir a Leonel"	25 November 2020
14	"¡Mateo está en peligro de muerte!"	26 November 2020
15	"Sandy desconfía de Valeria"	27 November 2020
16	"Leonel amenaza de muerte a Mateo"	30 November 2020
17	"Valeria decide irse de La Noria"	1 December 2020
18	"Nunca me voy a olvidar de usted"	2 December 2020
19	"Adiós Mateo"	3 December 2020
20	"¿Dónde está Valeria?"	4 December 2020
21	"¡Valeria está viva!"	7 December 2020
22	"¡Mateo encuentra a Valeria!"	8 December 2020
23	"Valeria está al borde de la muerte"	9 December 2020
24	"Valeria rechaza el amor de Leonel"	10 December 2020
25	"Me hace bien tenerte cerca"	11 December 2020
26	"A mí no me vas a llevar a la cama"	14 December 2020
27	"¡El heredero sería Mateo!"	15 December 2020
28	"¡Magdalena es la madre de Valeria!"	16 December 2020
29	"No me gusta estar presa"	17 December 2020
30	"Mateo rompe su compromiso con Sandy"	18 December 2020
31	"Mateo se va a casar conmigo le guste o no"	21 December 2020
32	"Sabina es la verdadera asesina de Amara"	22 December 2020
33	"No puedo dejar de amarte"	23 December 2020
34	"El nuevo acalde del Rosario"	24 December 2020
35	"Mostrar las garras"	25 December 2020
36	"Leonel busca a su hermano perdido"	28 December 2020
37	"¿Por qué te preocupas tanto por mi?"	29 December 2020
38	"Me muero por darte un beso"	30 December 2020
39	"Remi encuentra a la mamá de Valeria"	31 December 2020
40	"El nuevo Leonel Montes"	1 January 2021
41	"A los enemigos hay que tenerlos cerca"	4 January 2021
42	"Leonel manda a callar a Remi"	5 January 2021
43	"Sabina atenta contra su vida"	6 January 2021
44	"¿Por qué te tengo tan metida en la piel?"	7 January 2021
45	"Mateo le confiesa su amor a Valeria"	8 January 2021
46	"El nuevo rumbo de La Noria"	11 January 2021
47	"Un problema serio"	12 January 2021
48	"Cada quien con lo tuyo"	13 January 2021
49	"Lo vas a pagar con sangre"	14 January 2021
50	"Sandy y Leonel se dejan llevar por la pasión"	15 January 2021
51	"Creí que lo habías hecho por amor a mí"	18 January 2021
52	"Te tengo atravesado en el pecho"	19 January 2021
53	"Olvídame para siempre"	20 January 2021
54	"El padre Gabriel rechaza oficiar la boda de Mateo"	21 January 2021
55	"No sé qué estamos haciendo juntos"	22 January 2021
56	"Voy a retomar las riendas de mi vida"	25 January 2021
57	"Sandy está embarazada"	26 January 2021
58	"Luisa termina con Artemio"	27 January 2021
59	"Adiós para siempre"	28 January 2021
60	"¿Yo hijo de don Patricio?"	29 January 2021
61	"Sandy y Mateo se casan"	1 February 2021
62	"Ahora sí soy tu mujer"	2 February 2021
63	"¿Te quieres casar conmigo?"	3 February 2021
64	"Empezamos con el pie izquierdo"	4 February 2021
65	"Una segunda oportunidad"	5 February 2021
66	"¡Eres un Montes!"	8 February 2021
67	"Somos familia"	9 February 2021
68	"Nunca te voy a olvidar"	10 February 2021
69	"Carta a una madre"	11 February 2021
70	"Carta a una madre"	12 February 2021
71	"¿Por qué tienes que casarte con él?"	15 February 2021
72	"Una maldición en la familia"	16 February 2021
73	"Soltar una bomba"	17 February 2021
74	"Lo mejor que nos pudo pasar"	18 February 2021
75	"Limar asperezas"	19 February 2021
76	"No confió en ella"	22 February 2021
77	"Tiempos oscuros"	23 February 2021
78	"Matar dos sapos de una pedrada"	24 February 2021
79	"Tú me haces ser mala"	25 February 2021
80	"Monstruo"	26 February 2021
81	"Duda legítima"	1 March 2021
82	"Soy tu madre"	2 March 2021
83	"La caja de pandora"	3 March 2021
84	"Mateo es tu hijo"	4 March 2021
85	"Yo soy tu madre"	5 March 2021
86	"La hora de la verdad"	8 March 2021
87	"Aarón intenta quitarse la vida"	9 March 2021
88	"El verdadero Leonel Montes"	10 March 2021
89	"Valeria se va de La Noria"	11 March 2021
90	"Mereces que te mate"	12 March 2021
91	"Del infierno no sale"	15 March 2021
92	"Artemio es el padre de Tito"	16 March 2021
93	"Ya nada me queda en esta vida"	17 March 2021
94	"Poner reglas"	18 March 2021
95	"¡Eres una hipócrita!"	19 March 2021
96	"Artemio se lleva a Tito"	22 March 2021
97	"No tengo nada, Valeria"	23 March 2021
98	"¡Se roban a la novia!"	24 March 2021
99	"Valeria acepta ser la esposa de Leonel Montes"	25 March 2021
100	"Los tiempos de Dios son perfectos"	26 March 2021
101	"Ahora yo mando y el obedece"	29 March 2021
102	"El último hombre con el que me casaría"	30 March 2021
103	"Me estoy ahogando"	31 March 2021
104	"Esta batalla va a ser muy fuerte"	1 April 2021
105	"Sandy le declara la guerra a Mateo"	2 April 2021
106	"Yo soy tu papá"	5 April 2021
107	"Dos donadores para Angelita"	6 April 2021
108	"Unidos por Angelita"	7 April 2021
109	"Artemio escapa de la justicia"	8 April 2021
110	"No quiero que te pase nada"	9 April 2021
111	"Para que dejes de sufrir"	12 April 2021
112	"Mateo despierta del coma"	13 April 2021
113	"Viviendo con el enemigo"	14 April 2021
114	"Valeria sigue enamorada de ti"	15 April 2021
115	"Mataron a Artemio Cabrera"	16 April 2021
116	"¡Artemio está vivo!"	19 April 2021
117	"Todos están destinados a una muerte trágica"	20 April 2021
118	"Tiene que pagar por lo que hizo"	21 April 2021
119	"Hoy te mueres"	22 April 2021
120	"Ya podemos estar juntos y para siempre"	23 April 2021
121	"Leonel está buscando sangre"	25 April 2021
122	"Unidos por el corazón"	25 April 2021
Leonel threatens Mateo to burn La Noria and take revenge on Valeria, so he sends one of his men to kidnap her. After overcoming all adversity, Valeria and Mateo get married and toast to happiness with the whole family. Valeria and Mateo decide what to do with Patricio Montes' fortune.
