= Mi adorable maldición =

Mexican telenovela

- Genre: Telenovela
- Created by: Gabriela Ortigoza
- Based on: Lola Calamidades by Julio Jiménez
- Screenplay by: Gerardo Sánchez Luna; Félix Cortés-Schöler; Ricardo Tejeda
- Story by: Félix Cortés-Schöler; Julio Jiménez; Palmira Olguín; José Lerfino
- Directed by: Sandra Schiffner; Eduardo Said
- Starring: Renata Notni; Pablo Lyle; Laura Carmine; Roberto Blandón; José Carlos Ruiz; Patricia Navidad; Maya Mishalska
- Theme music composer: Jorge Eduardo Murguía; Mauricio Arriaga
- Opening theme: "Me quedo aquí contigo" by La Adictiva Banda San José de Mesillas
- Country of origin: Mexico
- Original language: Spanish
- No. of episodes: 121

Production
- Executive producer: Ignacio Sada
- Producer: Arturo Pedraza
- Editors: Víctor Hugo Flores Ordaz; Israel Flores Ordaz
- Camera setup: Multi-camera
- Production company: Televisa

Original release
- Network: Las Estrellas
- Release: January 23 – July 9, 2017

Related
- Despertar contigo; El vuelo de la victoria; Bella Calamidades

Mi adorable maldición ("My adorable curse") is a Mexican telenovela produced by Ignacio Sada. It is an adaptation of the Colombian story written by Julio Jiménez titled Lola Calamidades, whose most recent version at the time, Bella Calamidades, starred Danna García. The series was adapted for television by Gabriela Ortigoza and directed by Sandra Schiffner, Eduardo Said and Martha Montufar. It premiered on January 23, 2017, and ended on July 9, 2017. A total of 120 episodes were initially confirmed, but the show ran for 121 episodes.

The series stars Renata Notni as Aurora Sánchez, Pablo Lyle as Rodrigo Villavicencio, Laura Carmine as Mónica Solana, Roberto Blandón as Severo Trujillo, José Carlos Ruiz as Ponciano Juárez, Patricia Navidad as Apolonia Ortega and Maya Mishalska as Elsa Solana.

== Plot ==
Mi adorable maldición tells the story of Aurora, a beautiful teenager who, when born, was stigmatized by Macrina the midwife, as a creature born of evil, a carrier of misfortune, pain, and death. This is because Macrina discovers in Aurora a lunar in the form of skull on her navel, and the mother of Aurora dies just after the delivery. Anselmo, father of Aurora, fails to overcome the loss of his wife, Carmen. He dumps all his love in Aurora and insists on protecting and keeping her away from the people of the town who point her as an evil creature. Aurora's curious spirit takes her one day to disobey her father and approach the village. At first, Aurora does not understand why her father has denied meeting these people who are so kind, but everything changes the moment she meets Macrina, who recognizes Aurora and the supposed curse that weighs on her. The people, when identifying her, attack Aurora. Rodrigo, a boy of 15 years, intervenes to defend her. From that moment Aurora and Rodrigo initiate a beautiful friendship that will eventually become the first and only love of both.

== Production ==
Filming began on December 12, 2016, at Televisa San Ángel. The telenovela was formerly known as "La bella Lola", but was later renamed "Mi adorable maldición". On February 20, 2017, it was announced Conan O'Brien would have a guest appearance on the show.

== Cast ==
=== Main cast ===
- Renata Notni as Aurora Sánchez
- Pablo Lyle as Rodrigo Villavicencio
- Laura Carmine as Monica
- Roberto Blandón as Severo Trujillo
- José Carlos Ruiz as Ponciano Juárez
- Patricia Navidad as Apolonia Ortega
- Maya Mishalska as Elsa Solana
- Cecilia Gabriela as Corinne
- Socorro Bonilla as Macrina Romero
- Paty Díaz as Brígida Sánchez
- Erik Díaz as Rafael Galicia
- Alejandro Ávila as Camilo Espinosa
- Juan Ángel Esparza as Jerónimo Ríos
- Alejandro Ruíz as Comandante Onesimo Quiñones
- Bárbara Gómez as Altagracia
- Iliana de la Garza as Maximina
- Catalina López as Xócthil Romero
- Aldo Guerra as Luis Delgado
- Gema Garoa as Pilar Alarcón
- Ilse Ikeda as Bonifacia Mujica
- Christian Andrei as Wenceslao
- Fabiola Andere as Epifania
- Santiago Hernández as Gonzalo Galicia
- Ana Tena as Young Aurora
- Mikel as Young Rodrigo
- Ricardo Zertuche as Tobías Ávila Juárez
- Ignacio Guadalupe as Anselmo Sánchez
- Héctor Cruz Lara as Abundio Ibarra
- Virginia Marín as Gloria Júarez
- Carlos Athié as Ernesto
- Ernesto Gómez Cruz as Padre Basilio

=== Recurring ===
- Eva Cedeño as Inés Bustos
- Arturo Vásquez as Dionisio Ávila
- Raúl Coronado as Lucas Almada

=== Guest appearances ===
- Conan O'Brien as Joseph Robinson the Cheese Merchant

== Awards and nominations ==
Year	Award	Category	Nominated	Result
2018	TVyNovelas Awards	Best Leading Actor	José Carlos Ruiz	Nominated
