= Roberto Blandón =

Mexican actor

- Born: Roberto Blandón Jolly; March 8, 1961 (age 65); Mexico City, Mexico
- Spouse: Rebeca Mankita (m. 2011)
- Children: Regina Blandón

Roberto Blandon (born Roberto Blandon Jolly; March 8, 1961 in Mexico City) is a television actor in Mexico who starred in soap operas in that country in 1989, including the role of Henry in the soap opera "Mi segunda madre" producer Juan Osorio. He was among the first actors to join the broadcaster TV Azteca, then returned to Televisa. It has also been featured in theater performances and recently found in the soap opera recordings Camaleones.

== Biography ==
He studied drama and theater in high school performance of Andres Soler in the mid-1980s. He debuted in 1989 under the cast of the telenovela Mi segunda madre playing Henry. In 1990, participating in telenovelas Cuando llega el amor and Amor de nadie of both the producer Carla Estrada, which allowed his name to be increasingly popular within the media.

In 1994 made participation in Mujer, casos de la vida real and a year later in 1995 participated in Maria La Del Barrio and José María Cano one of the antagonists of the story, the same year he participated in the telenovela Bajo un mismo rostro playing Alejandro again one of the antagonistic character at the end of the latter includes the production of Para toda la vida.

In 1996, makes a special appearance on the soap opera Canción de amor, a year later made Mi querida Isabel the villain in Oscar history, this will be his last soap opera on Televisa in the old millennium and a year later in 1998, integrates the ranks of TV Azteca in the telenovela La Chacala where he played David, one of the main characters.

In 1999 Robert made the telenovela El candidato who staged Humberto Zurita and Lorena Rojas playing Adrian Cuevas, in 2000 reunites with actress Lucía Méndez telenovela in Golpe bajo and German Santos one of the antagonists of the story. In 2001, again worked with Lorena Rojas in Como en el cineas in love with the protagonist in July, this would be his last participation in TV Azteca.

In 2003, he resumed his career in Televisa with an antagonistic role on the telenovela Mariana de la noche and Ivan Lugo, later featured in Mujer de madera. In 2006, he took part in the teen telenovela Código Postal as one of the main characters. In 2007, a teen telenovela done again Muchachitas como tu playing Guillermo father of one of the girls played by Gloria Sierra. The same year he made a soap telenovela / comedy Al diablo con los guapos with a temporary character in history as the father of villanita Florence, played by Ariadne Diaz.

In 2008, he recorded the pilot episode of the series Mujeres Asesinas in chapter Jessica, toxica with Alejandra Barros and Odiseo Bichir. That year Oscar Cardenas played the villain in the telenovela Un gancho al corazon. In 2009, he worked in the production of Juan Osorio, Mi pecado.

== Filmography ==
=== Films ===
Year	Title	Role	Notes
2010	El atentado	Octaviano Liceaga	

=== Television ===
Year	Title	Role	Notes
1988	Amor en silencio	Unknown role	
1989	Mi segunda madre	Marcelo	
1990	Cuando llega el amor	Enrique	
1990	Amor de nadie	Carlos	
1994–2007	Mujer, casos de la vida real	Unknown role	"Hay justicia?" (Season 11, Episode 13); "Si pudiera amarte" (Season 12, Episode 28); "Una canción de amor" (Season 12, Episode 33); "La última advertencia" (Season 13, Episode 2); "Cosas de hombres: De hombre a hombre" (Season 24, Episode 1)
1995	María la del Barrio	José María Cano "Papacito"	Antagonist
1995	Bajo un mismo rostro	Alejandro	
1996	Para toda la vida	Lorenzo	
1996	La antorcha encendida	Félix Flores Alatorre	
1996	Canción de amor	Javier	
1996–1997	Mi querida Isabel	Óscar	
1997–1998	La chacala	David	
1999–2000	El candidato	Adrián Cuevas	
2000–2001	Golpe bajo	Germán Santos	
2001–2002	Como en el cine	Julio Escalante	
2003–2004	Mariana de la noche	Iván Lugo Navarro	
2004–2005	Mujer de madera	Marco Antonio Yáñez	
2005	Sueños y caramelos	André San Martin	
2006–2007	Código postal	Raúl González De La Vega	
2007	Vecinos	Ejecutivo	"¿Dónde está Rambo?" (Season 2, Episode 5)
2007	Muchachitas como tú	Guillermo Sánchez-Zúñiga	
2007–2008	Al diablo con los guapos	Domingo Echavarría	
2008	Mujeres asesinas	Luis Castillo	"Jéssica, tóxica" (Season 1, Episode 4)
2008–2009	Un gancho al corazón	Óscar Cárdenas	
2009	Mi pecado	Paulino Córdoba	
2009–2010	Camaleones	Javier Saavedra	
2010–2011	Llena de amor	Ricardo	"Deseo material" (Season 1, Episode 15)
2011	El Equipo	Sigfrido Martínez "El Jefe Sigma"	
2012	Un refugio para el amor	Maximino Torreslanda	Supporting Role
2013	Noches Con Platanito	Himself	"Roberto Blandon/Rebeca Mankita/Recoditos" (Season 2, Episode 2)
2013	La Tempestad	Unknown role	"Un nuevo comienzo" (Season 1, Episode 1)
2013–2014	Qué pobres tan ricos	Adolfo	"Un nuevo comienzo" (Season 1, Episode 1)
2014	El color de la pasión	Alfredo Suárez	Supporting Role
2014–2015	Como dice el dicho	Rulex / Ariel	"La conciencia vale más..." (Season 4, Episode 28); "Un padre supone más..." (Season 5, Episode 19)
2015–2016	Antes muerta que Lichita	Rafael	Special Participation
2016	Simplemente María	Enrique Montesinos	Special Participation
2017	Mi adorable maldición	Severo Trujillo	Main Antagonist
2019	Doña Flor y sus dos maridos	Oscar Hidalgo/Celeste	Supporting Role
2020	Quererlo todo	Tirso Quintero	Supporting Role
2021	Vencer el pasado	Heriberto	
2022	La Herencia	Chavita	

== Theatre ==
- 12 hombres en pugna
- La indigación
- Los 7 ahorcados
- Canto verde
- José el soñador
- Don Quijote de la Mancha
- El diluvio que viene
- Galileo Galilei
- La bella y la bestia
- Los miserables
