= Verónica Jaspeado =

Mexican actress (born 1976)

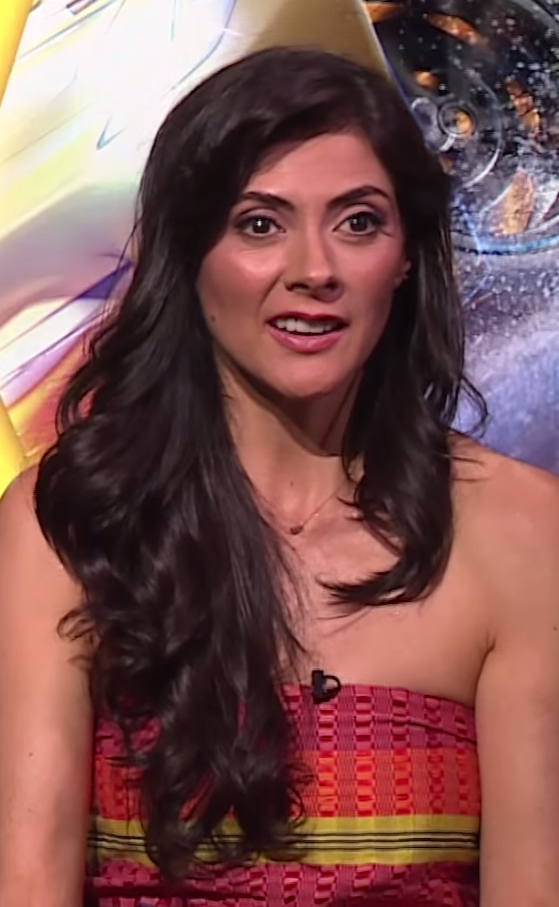
- Jaspeado in 2017
- Born: Verónica Alejandra Jaspeado Martínez; September 6, 1976 (age 49); Puebla, Mexico
- Other name: Veró Jaspeado
- Occupation: Actress
- Years active: 1994–present

Verónica Alejandra Jaspeado Martínez (born September 6, 1976) is a Mexican actress.

== Biography ==
She was born in Puebla, Mexico, on September 6, 1976. Veronica studied at the Centro de Capacitación Artística de Televisa (CEA). She also participated in the Acrobatics workshop at Centro Universitario de Teatro (CUT), of the UNAM. She has a sister. She has a band called DKDA and wrote the song "Pólvora Mojada". In 1994, she won the title of Nuestra Belleza Tlaxcala 1994, advancing her to that year's Miss Universe qualification finals for Mexico, Nuestra Belleza México 1994.

== Career ==
Jaspeado, who has modeled at national level, received her first opportunity as an actress in the telenovela DKDA: Sueños de juventud (1999), in which she played the role of Camila Saldivar. Two years later, Jaspeado got her second chance on the small screen to participate in El Derecho de Nacer (2001). She participated in La Otra, and Amor mío. Jaspeado made her debut in the musical comedy Los muchachos de Nueva York and later worked in Anastasia, the musical. This work led her to be recognized by the PTCA as "Revelación en teatro 1999". Professionalism and perseverance were the perfect combination for Jaspeado to be able to work under the guidance of 'Mr. Telenovela', Ernesto Alonso, in the melodrama Amarte es mi pecado. She shared credits with the great performance figures as Aaron Hernan, Macaria, Tiare Scanda and Odysseus Bichir, among others. She was involved in Un Gancho al Corazón as Ximena Sermeño, with Danna García and Sebastián Rulli. Jaspeado portrayed Josefina Valverde in Lo que la vida me robó. In mid-2016 she was cast as Sonia for the telenovela Vino el amor (2016). She dubbed Cruz Ramírez in the 2017 animated film Cars 3.

== Television series ==
- Tan cerca de ti, nace el amor – (2026) Nuria Miranda
- El precio de amarte – (2024) Roseta Saldìvar
- La herencia – (2022) Bertha Restrepo
- La desalmada – (2021) Juana Durán
- Papá a toda madre – (2017–2018) Verónica Valencia de Barrientos
- Vino el amor – (2016–2017) Sonia Ortiz
- Lo que la vida me robó – (2013–2014) Josefina "Finita, Josefa" Valverde de Mendoza / de Argüelles
- Verano de amor – (2009) Greta Perea Olmos
- Un gancho al corazón – (2008–2009) Ximena Sermeño
- Mujeres asesinas – (2008) Claudia
- Amor mío – Vera Esmeralda (2006–2007)
- Mujer, casos de la vida real (2001–2002)
- Amarte es mi pecado (2004) – Mirta Fernández
- Casting... Busco fama (2003)
- La Otra – (2002) Apolonia Portugal
- El derecho de nacer – (2001) Teté Puk de la Reguera
- DKDA: Sueños de juventud (1999) – Camila #eme15
- The Vow (2022) as herself
