= La herencia (2022 TV series) =

Mexican telenovela

- Genre: Telenovela
- Based on: Hijos del Monte by Víctor Carrasco
- Developed by: Pablo Ferrer García-Travesí; Santiago Pineda Aliseda
- Written by: Jaime Sierra; Helena Aguilera; Hugo Moreno Cano
- Directed by: Sandra Schiffner; Aurelio Avila
- Starring: Michelle Renaud; Matías Novoa; Emmanuel Palomares; Daniel Elbittar; Mauricio Henao; Juan Pablo Gil
- Theme music composer: Pedro Galindo Galarza; Elpidio Ramírez Burgos
- Opening theme: "La Malagueña" by Ángela Aguilar
- Ending theme: Regálame un instante by Michelle Renaud and Jessi Uribe
- Country of origin: Mexico
- Original language: Spanish
- No. of seasons: 1
- No. of episodes: 80

Production
- Executive producers: Roy Nelson Rojas; Juan Osorio
- Producer: Ignacio Ortiz Castillo
- Editors: Norma Ramírez Arias; Isabella Rodríguez; Socorro Manrique Díaz; Mónica Hernández
- Camera setup: Multi-camera
- Production company: TelevisaUnivision

Original release
- Network: Las Estrellas
- Release: 28 March – 15 July 2022

La herencia (English title: Legacy) is a Mexican telenovela that aired on Las Estrellas from 28 March 2022 to 15 July 2022. The series is produced by Juan Osorio for TelevisaUnivision, and is an adaptation of the Chilean telenovela Hijos del Monte. It stars Michelle Renaud, Matías Novoa, Daniel Elbittar, Emmanuel Palomares, Juan Pablo Gil, and Mauricio Henao.

== Plot ==
The telenovela takes place in an avocado farm called "Santa Catalina", where Severiano del Monte and Catalina Arango, Severiano's wife, and their five adopted sons live. Catalina was never able to get pregnant, but Severiano always wanted to have male descendants and opted for adoption. Severiano passes away, and the lives of his sons change on the day of the reading of the will, with the unexpected appearance of Sara, their sister, whom they did not know existed. Sara is the daughter of Deborah Portillo, Severiano's former lover. Sara grew up believing that her father was never interested in her. As Severiano's only biological child, Sara is willing to accept the inheritance. Everything gets complicated because the will has a suspensive condition clause that obliges the six siblings to live for a year in the farm in order not to lose their right to the inheritance.

== Cast ==
=== Main ===
- Michelle Renaud as Sara del Monte Portillo
- Matías Novoa as Juan del Monte
- Emmanuel Palomares as Simón del Monte
- Daniel Elbittar as Pedro del Monte
- Mauricio Henao as Mateo del Monte
- Juan Pablo Gil as Lucas del Monte
- Elizabeth Álvarez as Deborah Portillo
- Tiaré Scanda as Rosa Gutiérrez de Millán
- Paulina Matos as Julieta Millán
- Julián Gil as Próspero Millán Rico
- Juan Carlos Barreto as Modesto Pérez
- Diego de Erice as Cornelio Pérez
- Amaranta Ruíz as Adela Cruz
- Verónica Jaspeado as Bertha Restrepo
- Gloria Aura as Beatriz Hernandez
- Mildred Feuchter as Paloma Pérez
- Nicole Curiel as Jessica Millán
- Esmeralda Gómez as Alondra Millán
- Christian Ramos as Brayan Cruz
- André de Regíl as Brandon Cruz
- Farah Justiniani as Dulce Pérez
- Andrés Ruanova as Tadeo Pérez
- Sergio Basañez as Dante Alamillo
- Roberto Blandón as Salvador "Chavita" Pérez
- Rafael Inclán as Agustín Cruz

=== Recurring and guest stars ===
- Leonardo Daniel as Severiano del Monte
- Ana Ciocchetti as Catalina Arango
- Lucero Lander as Aurora Delgado
- Tian Altamirano as Amado
- Alberto Pavón as Henry Miller
- Manuel Riguezza as Bruno
- Gina Pedret as Irma

== Production ==
Filming began of the telenovela began in December 2021. The first teaser was shown on 28 February 2022. Filming concluded in May 2022.

== Ratings ==
Viewership and ratings per season of La herencia
| Season | Timeslot (CT) | Episodes | First aired | | Last aired | | Avg. viewers (millions) |
| Season | Timeslot (CT) | Episodes | Date | Viewers (millions) | Date | Viewers (millions) | Avg. viewers (millions) |
|---|---|---|---|---|---|---|---|
| 1 | Mon–Fri 8:30 p.m. | 80 | 28 March 2022 | 3.1 | 15 July 2022 | 3.6 | 3.01 |

== Episodes ==
| No. | Title | Mexico air date | U.S. air date | Mexico viewers (millions) | U.S. viewers (millions) |
|---|---|---|---|---|---|
| 1 | "La familia es lo más importante" | 28 March 2022 (Note: Premiered early online through Las Estrellas website on 26 March 2022.) | 11 July 2022 | 3.1 | 1.46 |
Sara receives a call from the bank to remind her that if she does not pay her debts, she may soon be foreclosed. Severiano del Monte announces his departure from the company and leaves his son Juan in charge, causing the envy of some of his brothers. Deborah asks Sara to ask for her father's help to pay the mortgage, which she refuses. Severiano asks Modesto to take care of his children in case he is absent. During the del Monte's party, Juan formalizes his engagement to Julieta and makes it public. Severiano confronts Pedro because he discovers that he has stolen from him, but he denies it. Simón complains to his father for his mother's suffering because of his infidelities. After their argument, Simón and Severiano have an accident on the road.
| 2 | "Los mismos derechos" | 29 March 2022 | 12 July 2022 | 3.2 | 1.41 |
Severiano dies after the car accident. After Severiano's death, the Del Monte's learn that they have a sister with whom they will share their inheritance. Faced with uncertainty, Sara shows up to meet the rest of her family. Severiano sets conditions to validate the delivery of the inheritance to his six children. Julieta arrives at the Del Monte's house and meets Sara and Deborah. Juan offers Sara a sum of money in exchange for her renouncing the inheritance, but she opposes and is willing to fight for what is rightfully hers.
| 3 | "Entrar en la boca del lobo" | 30 March 2022 | 13 July 2022 | 3.4 | 1.54 |
Juan warns Julieta that he will have to put up with Sara for a year because that is what their father stipulated in his will. Pedro confronts Juan to find out what his plans are with Sara, but he swears that he has nothing to do with her and leaves the way clear for his brother. Sara visits Juan to propose working in the family business, but he tells her that she must first discuss it with the rest of her siblings for their approval. Sara arrives at the chapel of the farm and says goodbye to her father's ashes, but rebukes him for all his mistakes. Julieta asks Mateo to forget about her, but he refuses to do so. Simón finds Déborah in his parents' room and gets upset when he sees his mother's photograph in the trash and decides to take out Déborah’s things, but she slaps him.
| 4 | "Una tregua" | 31 March 2022 | 14 July 2022 | 3.2 | 1.46 |
Sara defends her mother from Simón's attacks and Juan proposes that they all live together in peace for the rest of the year stipulated in the will. Julieta once again surprises Sara and Juan together, she asks Sara to participate in the planning of her wedding. Beatriz seeks Pedro in his office to reveal that Tadeo is their son. Deborah asks Prospero to take her for a walk after the argument with the Del Monte's, but the moment ends in a kiss. Sara tries to avoid Pedro. Julieta tells her mother that she is suspicious of Sara and Juan's good relationship. The Del Monte brothers go to the town's bar to find Mateo. Salvador is upset to see the rest of the Del Monte brothers in his bar and shoots Simón for the relationship he has with his daughter. Sara presents Juan with a proposal to reduce costs in the company and hopes that this will get her a job.
| 5 | "Va a sacar lo peor de todos" | 1 April 2022 | 15 July 2022 | 3.1 | 1.45 |
Juan gathers his siblings to decide if Sara can work in the company. In spite of everything, Sara wins the majority of votes and gets her job. Tadeo suffers an accident while playing at home and is knocked unconscious. Julieta cannot hide her jealousy for the closeness of Sara and her fiancé, so she complains to Juan for his attentions to his sister. Pedro runs to the hospital when he learns of Tadeo's accident and is surprised by his reaction. Prospero is afraid of being unfaithful to his wife. Cornelio and Beatriz argue over their son's accident and she confesses that she no longer loves him. Julieta’s jealousy causes her to lash out at Sara.
| 6 | "Darnos un tiempo" | 4 April 2022 | 18 July 2022 | 2.8 | 1.40 |
Mateo seeks out Juan and confesses his interest in Julieta. Sara visits Julieta at her house to talk about what happened between them, but Julieta's refusal makes Sara give her an ultimatum. Juan and Sara arrive at Chavita's cantina to ask him to reconsider what happened with her brothers, but everything gets out of control when a group of men try to take advantage of Sara. Pedro talks to his brothers about the possibility of him having a child, despite their different opinions, they all support him. Juan asks Julieta for time in their relationship, but she blames Sara for this decision. Juan decides to ends his relationship with Julieta because of her attitude.
| 7 | "Una cercanía muy peligrosa" | 5 April 2022 | 19 July 2022 | 3.0 | 1.34 |
Simón argues with Paloma over her revelation and asks her to leave his life forever. Pedro and Beatriz fight over Tadeo's paternity and are observed by Modesto. Pedro and Beatriz take Tadeo to a laboratory for a DNA test to prove who is the father of the child. Pedro warns Beatriz that if Tadeo is a Del Monte, he will take him away from her. Julieta begins to worry after Pedro's comments about Juan and Sara. Julieta enters Sara's room and begins to break all of her things because she believes she is to blame for her separation from Juan. Modesto surprises Julieta and tries to calm her down.
| 8 | "La mejor parte de la historia" | 6 April 2022 | 20 July 2022 | 3.3 | 1.30 |
Lucas asks Sara to confess if she is interested in Juan. Beatriz confesses to Cornelio that she cheated on him with Pedro Del Monte. Rosa confronts Juan for having cancelled the wedding with her daughter. Simón remembers the damage that Déborah did to his family, for this reason he will prevent Sara from collecting her part of the inheritance. Cornelio looks for Pedro to clear things up. Beatriz arrives at the Del Monte's house and confesses to Sara about Pedro's plans. Juan tries to clarify what happened with Cornelio, but he is inconsolable. Pedro gathers his brothers and confesses to them that Tadeo is a Del Monte.
| 9 | "El amor es una guerra" | 7 April 2022 | 22 July 2022 | 3.1 | 1.15 |
Pedro is determined to give his last name to Tadeo and take him to the farm. Mateo finds Julieta and asks her to run away together to live their relationship, but she rejects him. Deborah warns Sara that Juan's closeness to her is because he wants to manipulate her and leave her without an inheritance. Mateo takes off in his motorcycle and has an accident. Julieta tries to prevent Sara's work from being done efficiently. Pedro confesses to Beatriz that the DNA test proves that Tadeo is his son.
| 10 | "Sigues siendo un bebé" | 8 April 2022 | 25 July 2022 | 3.0 | 1.38 |
Dante informs Juan of Sara and her mother's financial problems. Sara and Julieta reach an agreement to work together. Julieta visits Mateo in the hospital and he promises not to bother her again. Agustín remembers Severiano's accident, but is unable to reveal what happened. Deborah reveals to Julieta her plan to separate Sara from Juan, but makes a request. Lucas has an equine-assisted therapy project in mind and asks for the support of his siblings, but only Sara is on his side. In the face of the refusal, Lucas threatens to leave the farm and give up his part of the inheritance.
| 11 | "Un regalo del cielo" | 11 April 2022 | 27 July 2022 | 2.8 | 1.22 |
Julieta reacts to Deborah's advice, but she warns her that she has already lost Juan's love. Juan seeks out Lucas to ask him to think things through and not to give up his part of the inheritance. Modesto confesses to Sara the truth about Juan and Pedro's past. Deborah obtains the liquidation of her debts thanks to Dante. Sara is determined to leave the house, but Juan asks her not to do that because he has changed thanks to her. Simón surprises Paloma at the cantina to show his love. Pedro arrives at Julieta's appointment and she asks him to join forces to separate Sara from Juan. Sara looks for Beatriz at her house and Beatriz confesses that Pedro is Tadeo's father.
| 12 | "Respetar las normas" | 12 April 2022 | 28 July 2022 | 2.9 | 1.13 |
Julieta has a surprise for Juan, and promises him that she will fight for his love. Cornelio and Beatriz reach an agreement to begin divorce proceedings. Sara almost catches her mother lusting after Dante. Pedro insists on putting Mateo in a place to help him with his illness. Dante confesses to Sara that the mortgage on her house was paid off by Juan. The Del Monte brothers stroll through the center of town and an attack occurs that endangers everyone. Juan explodes at Sara’s lack of commitment and gives her a severe scolding in front of Julieta and Pedro. Sara reacts and is not afraid of being fired, but Juan refuses to do so.
| 13 | "Cambiar el pasado" | 13 April 2022 | 29 July 2022 | 2.9 | 1.11 |
Julieta is sure that she can win Juan back, despite their differences. Simón reacts to Juan's order to work with Sara and everything gets out of control when he reveals all that Deborah did to separate their parents. Pedro needs someone to help him remove Juan from the presidency of the company and believes that Dante is the right person. Deborah visits Mateo after his accident, and gives him a bottle of wine, despite knowing about his illness. Pedro proposes to Dante to ally to remove Juan as president of the company, in exchange Dante would receive Refugio Santa Catalina. Sara confesses to Pedro that she already knows about his relationship with Tadeo. Juan and Lucas enter Mateo's room and find him unconscious from drinking alcohol.
| 14 | "Me quitaste a Julieta" | 14 April 2022 | 1 August 2022 | 2.3 | 1.23 |
Mateo drinks again. Cornelio threatens to shoot Pedro. Sara accepts that she felt something for Juan when she met him. Cornelio arrives at Beatriz's house to take her son. Mateo confesses to Juan that Julieta is the love of his life and that he took her away from him. Deborah warns Pedro to beware of her. Juan gets Simón to apologize to Deborah. Sara suggests to her mother that she go back to the apartment because she is tired of the problems. Juan ends his relationship with Julieta when he learns that she was his brother's girlfriend.
| 15 | "No me sueltes" | 15 April 2022 | 2 August 2022 | 2.3 | 1.24 |
Julieta believes that Juan ended their relationship because of Sara. Próspero asks Deborah to stop provoking him because he would be ashamed if his daughters discover that he is unfaithful to Rosa. Juan asks Sara to stay by his side so that the two of them can find some tranquility. Deborah assures Pedro that Sara is only conquered by men like Juan. Julieta assures Juan that Sara and Pedro make a beautiful couple. Rosa finds Jessica making out with Bryan. Julieta makes a rude remark to Sara.
| 16 | "No te vas de aquí" | 18 April 2022 | 4 August 2022 | 3.2 | 1.16 |
Julieta reveals in front of everyone at the party that her engagement to Juan is over. Rosa lashes out against Sara. Deborah tries to make an alliance with Pedro to separate Sara from Juan. Lucas tells Juan that Sara has left the farm after the scandal at the party. Juan finds Sara and reveals his feelings for her. Mateo apologizes to Juan for his feelings about Julieta. Simón confesses to his brothers that he is willing to marry Paloma. Deborah makes uncomfortable comments about the Del Monte's and Sara asks her to leave the house if she does not apologize. Simón is wanted by the police on charges of gender violence and assault against Déborah.
| 17 | "Ningún secreto más en la familia" | 19 April 2022 | 5 August 2022 | 3.4 | 1.25 |
Pedro argues with Beatriz about Tadeo's situation and he threatens to take him away from her. Sara tells her mother to leave the farm because of what happened with Simón. Simón manages to leave the public prosecutor's office without charges against him, but Juan decides to confront Déborah to kick her out of the farm. Pedro walks around the farm next to Tadeo and confesses to him that he is his father. Julieta arrives at the Del Monte farm to apologize for what happened with her mother. Juan learns of Pedro's paternity over Tadeo. Modesto reveals to Sara that Déborah has always received financial support from Severiano. Cornelio and Pedro confront each other about Tadeo's presence at the farm, but this sparks an argument between the Del Monte brothers.
| 18 | "Te voy a amar toda mi vida" | 20 April 2022 | 8 August 2022 | 3.0 | 1.27 |
Sara looks for Pedro to console him after the argument with his brothers, but they are surprised by Juan. Jessica arrives home holding Brayan's hand and reveals that they are married, Rosa opposes this relationship. Juan takes advantage of Dante's visit to scold him for what he planned with Pedro. Pedro is determined to get Tadeo back. Juan tells Sara that she is the woman of his life. Cornelio learns that Pedro is Tadeo's real father. Cornelio asks Juan to leave Tadeo by his side.
| 19 | "No se puede ocultar el amor" | 21 April 2022 | 9 August 2022 | 3.0 | 1.19 |
Cornelio declares himself the enemy of the rest of the Del Monte brothers. Déborah plans to join forces with Cornelio to defeat the Del Monte brothers. Pedro finds Juan kissing Sara in the patio of the farm and confronts them for what is going on between them. Pedro gathers his brothers to tell them about Juan and Sara's relationship. None of the Del Monte brothers are willing to accept the relationship. Simón runs into Paloma's arms and ends up confessing to her that he killed his father. Mateo and Julieta arrive for their date, but are interrupted by Juan and Sara. Julieta learns of Juan and Sara’s relationship and her reaction surprises everyone.
| 20 | "Destruyes todo lo que tocas" | 22 April 2022 | 11 August 2022 | 2.6 | 1.29 |
Débora reveals to Modesto that Tadeo is Pedro's son and he cannot believe this. Julieta informs Juan that the new fertilizers have ruined the avocado production. In desperation, Juan warns Sara that if this is her fault she will be in trouble. Mateo confronts Sara for allegedly causing a tragedy with the avocado production and Juan questions her about whether she added anything to the fertilizers.
| 21 | "Voy a dar mi herencia" | 25 April 2022 | 12 August 2022 | 3.0 | 1.15 |
Juan reproaches Sara for what is happening at the farm and she assumes all the consequences. Julieta talks to Pedro to assure him that the loss of the harvest is good for him because he can spend more time with Sara. Modesto confronts Beatriz because he already knows that Tadeo is Pedro's son. Pedro seeks out Henry to offer him a new deal to eliminate Juan from the company. The Del Monte brothers discuss the problem with the change of fertilizer and under pressure, Sara decides to give her part of the inheritance to solve this, but Juan also assumes his share of responsibility. Sara thanks Lucas for having supported her in front of his brothers. Juan continues to have doubts about Sara and remembers his father's advice.
| 22 | "Me gustas mucho, Sara" | 26 April 2022 | 15 August 2022 | 3.2 | 1.32 |
Próspero asks Déborah to be more discreet with their relationship if they want to stay together. Pedro takes advantage of the estrangement between Sara and Juan to spend time with her, and confesses his feelings for her. Modesto is ready to leave Santa Catalina and says goodbye to Juan. Sara asks Pedro to control his feelings because she loves Juan. Simón asks for Paloma's hand, but Chavita refuses to give in, however Paloma confronts her father. Dante and Déborah warn Sara not to give away her fortune to save the company. Pedro asks his brothers to stick together because of Juan's bad business dealings. Henry confronts the Del Monte's about the absence of the production and threatens Juan with a lawsuit.
| 23 | "No se mezcla el amor con el trabajo" | 27 April 2022 | 16 August 2022 | 3.0 | 1.22 |
Juan asks his brothers to leave if they are not comfortable in the company. Agustín reveals to Adela that Simón abandoned his father on the day of his death. The Cruz family arrives for dinner at the Millán's house. Juan confesses to Sara that he distrusts everyone when it comes to work, even her. Modesto decides to leave to be by his son's side. Juan calls Pedro's attention to his behavior with Modesto, but Pedro admits that he hates Modesto because he is reminded of his father's love for Juan. Déborah confesses her relationship with Prospero to Sara.
| 24 | "Cuidado con el amor" | 28 April 2022 | 17 August 2022 | 3.1 | 1.12 |
After finding out that her mother is Próspero's lover, Sara calls her a homewrecker. Pedro and Juan argue over Tadeo's presence at the farm, but it later turns into a fight for Sara's love. Cornelio arrives for Tadeo to take him to school, but they actually plan to escape far from everything. Juan questions Dante about his father's disengagement from Sara and Dante confirms it. Lucas kisses Alondra. The Del Monte's pursue Cornelio after learning that he is about to take Tadeo away. Although they prevent Cornelio from stopping in the middle of the road, Pedro ends up shooting him.
| 25 | "Asume tu responsabilidad" | 29 April 2022 | 18 August 2022 | 2.7 | 1.37 |
Mateo shows Julieta how he feels about her with a kiss. Juan warns Sara to beware of Pedro, since his brother knows how to conquer women and assurers her that it was a mistake to appoint her as financial manager without having extensive knowledge of the field. Julieta tries to humiliate Sara, but Sara puts her in her place. Julieta asks Pedro to protect Sara. Modesto asks Mateo not to relapse into alcohol. Pedro is convinced that Sara is innocent and claims that someone manipulated the harvest to harm her.
| 26 | "Las cosas se saben tarde o temprano" | 2 May 2022 | 19 August 2022 | 2.9 | 1.16 |
Juan apologizes to Sara for what happened and assures her that he will always make professional demands on her. Chavita reveals to Paloma that her mother is alive. Jessica confesses to Alondra that Déborah is their father's mistress. Pedro tells Sara about his past. Sara cannot stand Julieta's insults and slaps her. Tadeo hears Cornelio say that he is not his father and he questions his parents. Irma is back in town and asks Déborah for help to get closer to her daughter. Próspero confesses to his family that they have gone bankrupt. Alondra reacts to her Próspero's news and assures him that it is all because of his mistress. Henry unleashes a scandal on the Del Monte family. Pedro assures Juan that he will take over the business because of his inability to run it.
| 27 | "Agarrar el toro por los cuernos" | 3 May 2022 | 22 August 2022 | 2.8 | 1.18 |
Amado seeks out Déborah to ask for her help and to bring him closer to his brother Lucas. Juan decides to respond to Henry's accusations and makes it clear that Sara is his girlfriend. After Juan's message on social media, he makes it clear to Pedro that he is willing to continue in the company. Chavita tries to prevent Irma and Paloma from meeting again. Pedro insists on wanting the presidency and Juan confronts him for the frauds he has done in the company and assures that he will do everything to get him out of the business. Juan arrives at Henry's office to complain about the scandal he caused and they come to blows.
| 28 | "Legado de odio" | 4 May 2022 | 23 August 2022 | 2.7 | 1.03 |
Simón confronts Sara for everything he says his sister has done. Sara can't stand the accusations against her and puts Simón in his place. Simón insists that Sara is a social climber like Déborah, takes her by force and throws her out of the house in the rain, but Sara swears to him that she will never forget this humiliation. Sara decides not to say anything to Juan about what happened. Déborah arrives at Santa Catalina and reveals to the Del Monte that Pedro loves her daughter. Simón announces to his brothers that he is ready to marry Paloma, but Pedro asks him to make sure she is not his sister.
| 29 | "Abrázame fuerte" | 5 May 2022 | 24 August 2022 | 3.1 | 1.20 |
After a strong argument with his brothers, Pedro reveals to all the Del Monte that he and Juan are the sons of a prostitute. Próspero throws Mateo out of his house for being drunk. Simón avoids the conversation about what happened with Sara at all costs. After making love, Juan and Sara are discovered by Pedro, who is surprised to see them together.
| 30 | "No me dejo de nadie" | 6 May 2022 | 25 August 2022 | 2.7 | 1.09 |
Mateo and Julieta expose Déborah and Dante for going out together to a restaurant. Julieta and Déborah’s throw their drinks at each other during their argument. Henry interrupts Sara's speech at the congress and assures everyone that she is a bastard. Sara calls out Henry's behavior and receives the applause of everyone in the congress. Juan desperately searches for Sara and Pedro after they leave the congress, because of a threatening phone call he receives. The Del Monte brothers are intercepted and beaten by a group of hooded men who knock them unconscious.
| 31 | "Lucha por tu vida" | 9 May 2022 | 26 August 2022 | 3.4 | 1.13 |
Juan discovers Sara and Pedro in a very bad state after being intercepted in the middle of the road. Paloma arrives desperate with Simón to tell him what happened with her mother. Paloma is surprised of Simón's violent attitude, when she learns that he threw Sara into the mud. Deborah arrives at the hospital to know Sara's condition and points out the Del Monte family as the culprits. Irma arrives at the Millán's house to threaten Rosa with revealing that she was Severiano Del Monte's lover. Lucas reveals the secret of what happened between Sara and Simón, a fact that makes Juan angry.
| 32 | "Voy a tener un hijo" | 10 May 2022 | 29 August 2022 | 2.1 | 1.23 |
The argument between Juan and Simón continues. Déborah informs Rosa that she will have to return to Santa Catalina to defend her daughter's property. Juan regrets the situation with his brothers and assures them that he will have to make a difficult decision. Próspero is fed up with Rosa's accusations and asks for a divorce due to the lack of love in their relationship. Pedro cries before Sara and confesses that she and Tadeo are the most important things in his life. Julieta looks for Juan to announce that she is expecting his child. Pedro looks at Sara's vulnerability and cannot resist kissing her and vows to fight for her love.
| 33 | "Voy a matar a Sara" | 11 May 2022 | 30 August 2022 | 3.1 | 1.23 |
Paloma has doubts about marrying Simón and prefers to postpone the wedding. Sara wakes up and finds Juan in the hospital room. After the problem she experienced, Sara asks Juan to marry her. Irma seeks Simón's help to help her get Paloma back. Simón is intercepted by a group of men who end up wounding him in the foot. Sara learns that Henry lost his life and listens to Pedro's speculation about this. Juan continues to receive threats of harming Sara and prefers to stay away from her to save her life. Déborah and Dante reveal to Lucas that his birth mother is alive. Juan is willing to take care of Julieta’s son, as long as it is proven that he is the father.
| 34 | "Mal de ojo" | 12 May 2022 | 1 September 2022 | 2.8 | 1.25 |
Pedro warns Juan that he will not allow him to take advantage of Sara and everything gets out of control when Pedro claims that his brother killed Henry. Julieta looks for Mateo to tell him to leave her alone now that she is going to live at the farm. Rosa tells Próspero that Julieta is pregnant. Sara returns home, but Déborah wants to take control of the farm. Dante confesses to Pedro that Juan already knows about the embezzlement of the company.
| 35 | "Voy a impugnar el testamento" | 13 May 2022 | 2 September 2022 | 3.0 | 1.08 |
Juan tells Sara that he must leave the farm because Julieta is pregnant and he is ready to start a family with her. Pedro lies to Simón and tells him that Juan has embezzled from the company. Déborah arrives at the hacienda with Amado and surprises Lucas by revealing that he is his brother. Sara bursts into tears in front of her father's portrait and swears that she will become the sole heir. Sara seeks her mother's support to help her with everything that is going on around her. Sara gathers her siblings to confess that she will fight for all of her father's inheritance, since she is Severiano's only legitimate daughter.
| 36 | "Les voy a quitar todo" | 16 May 2022 | 5 September 2022 | 3.1 | 1.18 |
Dante informs Julieta that Déborah's lover is Próspero. Faced with the news, Julieta decides to confront Déborah. Lucas confesses to Mateo that he has a blood brother. Sara begins to make decisions about the future of the farm. Brayan enters the Millán family, but surprises everyone with his behavior. Sara tells Juan that she feels betrayed by what he did, but she promises to stay at the farm and has a warning. Déborah finds Próspero in the farm and kisses him, but they are surprised by Julieta.
| 37 | "El amor que merezco" | 17 May 2022 | 5 September 2022 | 3.2 | 1.18 |
Amado tries to convince Lucas to meet his mother. Déborah and Rosa argue about Julieta's presence at the Del Monte's house. Irma reveals to Déborah that Rosa was Severiano's lover. Sara has a new strategy for the partners of the company, but prefers to do it without the consent of her brothers. Mateo prefers to stay away from Julieta, but she pursues him until she kisses him. The argument between Julieta and Mateo continues until he accidentally hits her.
| 38 | "No se van a deshacer de mí" | 18 May 2022 | 6 September 2022 | 2.9 | 1.32 |
Déborah wants to get rid of Catalina's portraits, but Modesto and Adela prevent her. Juan receives a new threat and asks Sara to leave the company. The Del Monte brothers discover that Déborah removed Catalina's portrait from the house and confront her, but Deborah changes the conversation by confessing that Modesto was her ally. Dante warns Sara that Juan will take her share of the inheritance. Simón discovers that his mother's portrait is missing and threatens to kill Sara.
| 39 | "No habrá paz" | 19 May 2022 | 7 September 2022 | 2.8 | 1.29 |
Juan questions Simón about whether he sent him the threats about Sara, but he denies it. Amado beats up Cornelio when he learns that he revealed that Lucas is his brother. Sara looks for Julieta to see how she is doing, but Julieta brags that she is going to be Juan’s wife. Pedro learns that there is already an investigation about the threats to Sara. Sara surprises Juan by assuring that she could live her life with Pedro. Modesto wishes to clarify his situation with the Del Monte's and Juan accepts his apology.
| 40 | "Tomar cartas en el asunto" | 20 May 2022 | 7 September 2022 | 2.7 | 1.29 |
Mateo reveals that the child Julieta is expecting is his, Juan sees him drunk and assures him that he does not know what he is saying. Juan asks Julieta to take a DNA test. Sara recommends Juan to admit Mateo to a rehab clinic. Mateo assures Juan he is telling the truth, Juan informs him that he is going to enter a rehab clinic. Pedro and Sara almost kiss.
| 41 | "Este bebé es tuyo" | 23 May 2022 | 8 September 2022 | 2.9 | 1.24 |
Lucas tells Simón that Amado is his blood brother and that Déborah is one of the few people who knew this. Simón confronts Déborah about the beating that Lucas received, as he suspects she is behind it. Cornelio arrives at Beatriz's house and tries to abuse her. Próspero surprises his family with a makeover to win back his wife. Sara discovers what happened between Cornelio and Beatriz, so she tries to convince her to report her ex-husband. The Del Monte's desperately search for Lucas and after finding him, he refuses to return to the farm. Juan confirms that the child Julieta is expecting is his, but confesses that he does not want to marry her.
| 42 | "Una familia rota" | 24 May 2022 | 8 September 2022 | 2.7 | 1.24 |
Tadeo finds Déborah and Dante kissing in the barn. Beatriz arrives to report Cornelio to the public prosecutor's office. Dante arrives with Juan and warns him that he will start the proceedings so that Lucas loses his part of the inheritance. Sara questions Juan for not preventing Lucas from leaving the estate. Próspero confesses to his wife that he has another woman, but Rosa believes that the lover is Bertha. While walking through town, Prospero is saddened because he failed to impress Rosa with his new look and finds Adela and confesses to her that he was Déborah's lover. Cornelio accuses Sara of aggression and gets a restraining order against her. Modesto can't take it anymore and reveals to Juan what Agustín said about Simón and Severiano's death.
| 43 | "Los declaro marido y mujer" | 25 May 2022 | 9 September 2022 | 2.8 | 1.24 |
Déborah tries to convince Bertha to work at her side after being fired by Rosa. Cornelio confesses to his father what he did with Beatriz. Paloma is ready to celebrate her wedding, but her father opposes attending. Once at the church, Simón is surprised with Lucas and Mateo’s arrival. Chavita surprises everyone when he arrives at the church for his daughter's wedding. Lucas confesses to his brothers what really happened with his biological mother. Pedro questions Sara about whether she still loves Juan.
| 44 | "Una nueva guerra" | 26 May 2022 | 9 September 2022 | 2.4 | 1.24 |
Pedro feels jealous of Juan's presence around Sara. Dante breaks the news to Sara that her father's will is contested and she stands firm with the decision. Juan receives a mysterious call assuring that it is his mother who is on the other side. Rosa visits Juan in the office to demand that he marries Julieta, but he opposes this imposition. Lucas visits the company with his mother, but Déborah's comments provoke a health crisis in this woman. Dante looks for Aurora, Juan and Pedro's mother, and plans a reunion between them.
| 45 | "Las cosas se van a poner mal" | 27 May 2022 | 12 September 2022 | 2.7 | 1.37 |
Déborah and Rosa arrive at the same restaurant where Dante is and he lies when he introduces Aurora. Julieta overhears Mateo's phone call with another woman and tells on him for this. Lucas finds the guys who assaulted him and they threaten him once again. Sara confronts Juan and accuses him of shady business dealings outside the company. Déborah confesses to Rosa that she is Próspero's lover. Chavita visits Agustín's house to confess to him that he is interested in Adela. Rosa learns that her daughters already knew of Próspero's infidelity with Déborah and she decides to stay away. Julieta argues with Sara and makes Juan believe that she wanted to throw her down the stairs.
| 46 | "No es fácil perdonar" | 30 May 2022 | 12 September 2022 | 2.9 | 1.37 |
Sara explains to Juan what happened on the stairs with Julieta, but the only one who believes her is Mateo. Próspero tries to apologize and make Rosa see reason for his infidelity with Déborah, but she decides to leave the house. Pedro wants to know if Sara is Severiano's legitimate daughter and asks Déborah for the documents. Rosa arrives at the Del Monte house and confesses that Déborah stole Prospero's love. Déborah reveals that Rosa was Severiano's lover. Pedro surprises Beatriz by giving her the deeds of the house where she lives. Beatriz doubts the possible sisterhood of Julieta and Sara.
| 47 | "La peor pesadilla" | 31 May 2022 | 13 September 2022 | 3.0 | 1.41 |
Lucas manages to forgive his mother in the midst of the agony she suffers. Déborah assures Dante that she could take Rosa's business because of the papers she made her sign. Julieta shows Juan her son's first heartbeats. Aurora appears in Sara's office and asks for her help to recover Juan and Pedro's affection. Lucas' assailants arrive at the cantina to hold him accountable, but Lucas' brothers will put them in their place.
| 48 | "Nadie se mete con los Del Monte" | 1 June 2022 | 13 September 2022 | 2.7 | 1.41 |
Lucas confesses to his brothers that the men who attacked him were the same ones who tried to assault him. Déborah finds Rosa's letters to Severiano. Cornelio learns that Pedro bought the house for Beatriz and her son. Amado confesses to Simón that Victorio tried to kill him. Próspero looks for Rosa to ask for a second chance, but she opposes and he decides to divorce her. Lucas reveals to his brothers that Victorio and his men were about to rape him. Victorio and his men break into Santa Catalina to harm the Del Monte's. Modesto fights the Victorio’s men and is wounded.
| 49 | "Déjame ser feliz con quien yo quiera" | 2 June 2022 | 15 September 2022 | 2.7 | 1.27 |
One of Victorio's men is captured by the police, but ends up disarming one of the officers and thus threatening the Del Monte family. Pedro talks to Sara to confess his love and she gives him hope. Déborah interrupts Próspero's conversation with Rosa to threaten her. Sara looks for Juan to announce that she is giving up her love for him so that he can be happy with Julieta, she is determined to rebuild her life with Pedro. Pedro finds Victorio's location and makes him pay for what he did with the Del Monte family.
| 50 | "Sanar las heridas" | 3 June 2022 | 15 September 2022 | 2.5 | 1.27 |
Julieta agrees to marry Juan, even though she knows he does not love her. Modesto awakens after being seriously wounded. Dante asks Aurora to control Pedro in exchange for money. Julieta finds Sara in Pedro's room and takes photos of them, which she later sends to Juan. The news of Victorio's death reaches Santa Catalina. Mateo introduces his new girlfriend. Juan takes advantage of the fact that the whole family is gathered to tell them that he will marry Julieta.
| 51 | "Todo llega cuando menos lo esperas" | 6 June 2022 | 16 September 2022 | 2.9 | 1.25 |
Pedro proposes to Sara to be his girlfriend. Agustín asks Chavita to report Cornelio for the crime he committed. Sara tells Pedro that Aurora is back. Lucas admits to Juan that the torment he experienced with Victorio has brought him problems in his relationship. Pedro rejects the idea of seeing his mother again and is willing to make her pay for what she did to him and Juan. Déborah reveals to Rosa and Próspero that she is the new owner of the store. Mateo announces to his siblings that he is willing to give up his share of the inheritance, but Sara informs the Del Monte's that the will is contested, Simón is outraged and wants to put a stop to her plans.
| 52 | "Sara, la ambiciosa" | 7 June 2022 | 16 September 2022 | 2.9 | 1.25 |
Bryan seeks a raise, but Pedro humiliates him. Sara warns Juan that she wants the entire inheritance, including the office where he works. Pedro threatens Bryan with dispossessing his family of the house they are in. Lucas confesses to Alondra that he was about to be tormented by Victorio and his men. Próspero asks Rosa if she was in love with Severiano, but she denies it. Modesto returns to Santa Catalina.
| 53 | "Soy Aurora, su madre" | 8 June 2022 | 19 September 2022 | 2.8 | 1.21 |
Tadeo tells Pedro that he overheard Dante talking about Henry's death. Déborah brags to Julieta about taking over her mother's store and Julieta slaps her. Brayan talks to Sara to ask for a raise, but Pedro's appearance makes him nervous. Cornelio admits to Simón that Déborah was involved in his attack. Aurora appears at the farm before Juan and Pedro, but is met with rejection from her sons. Pedro confesses to Juan that Aurora had already tried to look for them. Simón confronts Déborah for having him beat up. Sara asks her mother to return the textile store to Rosa, but Déborah opposes.
| 54 | "Que la razón no le gane al corazón" | 9 June 2022 | 19 September 2022 | 3.1 | 1.21 |
Juan is alone with Sara and tries to kiss her and ask her if she has feelings for Pedro. Pedro threatens Dante with revenge if he finds out that he had anything to do with Aurora's appearance. Juan warns Julieta that he does not plan on having a church wedding. Pedro shows Sara documents that prove that Juan stole from the company. Déborah complains to Cornelio about what he told to Simón. Juan is willing to see his mother again. Mateo rejects Julieta's kisses and assures her that the child she is expecting is his.
| 55 | "Pedro del Monte es un monstruo" | 10 June 2022 | 20 September 2022 | 2.7 | 1.30 |
Juan explains to Sara that he separated from her because of the extortion calls, but Sara does not believe him. Brayan arrives at the appointment with Pedro. Rosa asks Bertha to help her recover the letters that Deborah has. Jessica is desperate because Brayan does not arrive at the house and in her fury, offends her father, and Próspero throws her out of the house. Sara believes that there can be no reconciliation with Juan because of the lies. Brayan arrives at Chavita's cantina and confesses to Cornelio everything Pedro did to him. Sara questions Juan about whether he committed fraud in the company, but he denies everything, she assures him that she has proof.
| 56 | "Se paga con cárcel" | 13 June 2022 | 20 September 2022 | 3.1 | 1.30 |
Dante tries to manipulate Aurora to take advantage of the Del Monte fortune. Juan appears at every moment in Sara's life, even in her dreams. Alondra makes Julieta see that she is jealous of Mateo's new relationship. Brayan returns to the Millan's house, but finds himself in shock. The Del Monte's arrive at the meeting, but Pedro tries to ruin Juan's reputation. Juan tries to make his brothers believe that Henry is the one who was in charge of planning the fraud against the company, but when he talks privately with Pedro, Juan lets him see that he already knew everything.
| 57 | "Perro que ladra no muerde" | 14 June 2022 | 21 September 2022 | 3.5 | 1.25 |
Aurora tells Pedro that she was sent by Dante, Pedro is furious and confronts Dante. Julieta suffers a hemorrhage during her visit to the office. Déborah throws Tadeo down the stairs, but he falls on Sara. Adela defends Tadeo from Déborah's accusations and gets slapped. Dante threatens Pedro. Sara forces Déborah to apologize to Adela. Dante looks for Aurora to threaten her for what she said to Pedro, but she has a proposal for him. Sara is nauseous and raises suspicions about a possible pregnancy. Pedro confronts Déborah and puts a stop to her plans.
| 58 | "Te voy a perder para siempre" | 15 June 2022 | 23 September 2022 | 3.3 | 1.25 |
Pedro apologizes to his brothers for having pointed out Juan as a thief. Simón tries to run over Déborah with his truck. Mateo enters Juan's office to look for Julieta's DNA test. Juan tells Aurora to stay away from him and Pedro, but she assures him that this will happen in exchange for refuge at Santa Catalina. Sara and Juan enjoy their last dance together before he gets married, he assures her that he could call off his wedding if she asks him to. Sara's pregnancy test is positive, but she can't do anything about it because Juan is about to marry Julieta.
| 59 | "El corazón se me rompe en mil pedazos" | 16 June 2022 | 23 September 2022 | 3.2 | 1.25 |
Juan and Julieta get married. Lucas tells Sara that he already knows about her pregnancy and is willing to support her. Rosa and Déborah fight over the textile store in the middle of Juan and Julieta's wedding. Julieta provokes Sara and asks her to leave the farm, but Sara refuses. Pedro tries to take care of Sara, but discovers that she is pregnant and pretends not to have seen the test. Lucas tries to spend the night with Alondra, but memories of the night he was attacked prevent him from being able to give himself to her. The Del Monte's have a competitor who offers better prices and has taken several clients away from them.
| 60 | "Las máscaras se caen" | 17 June 2022 | 26 September 2022 | 2.9 | 1.35 |
Déborah finds the textile store closed and confronts Rosa and Próspero. Mateo finds the DNA test of Julieta's son in Pedro's room. The Del Monte's have a meeting because a new company has taken away their most important clients and Dante asks Pedro to reveal the name of the owner of the company Campo Verde in front of his brothers. Déborah receives a bottle of wine as a gift and believes it is from Dante, she drinks the wine and is poisoned. Cornelio looks for Pedro to ask him not to take Tadeo to Santa Catalina anymore because of what might happen to him, Pedro assures that they should not fear Déborah.
| 61 | "Justicia divina" | 20 June 2022 | 27 September 2022 | 3.3 | 1.46 |
Sara visits her mother in the hospital and Déborah goes into cardiac arrest. Sara believes that Simón is to blame for what happened to Déborah. Bertha asks Modesto if he wants to marry her. Rosa makes a bad comment about Déborah in front of Sara and is kicked out of Santa Catalina. Pedro believes that Lucas is interested in Sara and asks him to stay away. Juan visits Agustín to talk about the suspicions he had about Simón after his father's death. Julieta overhears Sara telling Adela that she is pregnant and loses control, until Mateo arrives to help her. Brayan is ready to leave the Millán house and gives Jessica an ultimatum. Pedro assures that Sara's child will not be born.
| 62 | "Por la familia uno es capaz de todo" | 21 June 2022 | 28 September 2022 | 3.3 | 1.35 |
Julieta confesses to Pedro that she knows about Sara's pregnancy and they are willing to get rid of the baby. Juan agrees to give his share of Santa Catalina to Aurora in exchange for her to stop tormenting Pedro. Simón confronts Paloma for taking birth control pills. Pedro explodes with anger because he sees his mother at the farm. Julieta objects to Mateo's girlfriend visiting him. Brandon is accused of selling drugs at the town's high school, but he denies everything. Pedro seeks Aurora to ask her for the part of Santa Catalina in exchange for shares in the company, she ends up accepting and tells him everything that is going on with Dante. Julieta Baby is willing to support Mateo and find out if Julieta's son is his.
| 63 | "La verdadera cara de Pedro" | 22 June 2022 | 29 September 2022 | 3.6 | 1.29 |
Juan reveals to Simón that he gave part of Santa Catalina to his biological mother. Sara faints at the office. Beatriz manages to persuade Juan that everything that is happening with Sara is due to gastritis. Lucas tells Juan about Pedro's threats. Brandon proves that Matilde is the owner of the backpack with drugs. Sara asks Pedro to keep their distance, but he refuses to do so. Julieta provokes Simón's fury for her comments about Déborah. Mateo tries to convince Julieta that he will forget about the child she is expecting, but gets the DNA test. Pedro meets with Aurora at the barn, but she confronts him with a gun. Julieta tries to stop Sara from talking alone with Juan, but she does not fall for her comments. Modesto discovers that the barn is a place where Pedro annihilates his enemies, one of them Aurora.
| 64 | "Voy a luchar por alguien más" | 23 June 2022 | 30 September 2022 | 3.0 | 1.37 |
Sara tells Juan that she is pregnant. Pedro kills Aurora and buries her body in the farm, but is observed by Modesto. The Millán's arrive at the Cruz's house to try to clarify the situation between Jessica and Brayan. Sara announces to the Del Monte's that she is giving up her inheritance because she is leaving the farm, but Juan and Pedro oppose her decision. Cornelio proposes to Brayan to put a stop to all of Pedro's evil deeds. Tadeo thinks that his father no longer cares about him because Pedro has distanced himself from him. Brayan confesses to Chavita that Cornelio went in search of his father because of the danger he is in in Santa Catalina.
| 65 | "¡Sara no es una Del Monte!" | 24 June 2022 | 3 October 2022 | 2.9 | 1.43 |
Sara leaves the farm, but Pedro and Julieta have an accident planned; however, they Juan prevents the accident. Modesto worsens after seeing Pedro take Aurora's life and decides to leave Santa Catalina. Déborah wakes up and when questioned by Sara, she tries to remember who poisoned her. Juan learns that Julieta gave an order to the employees to neglect the horses. Pedro arrives at the hospital and overhears Dante tell Déborah that her daughter Sara should never have suffered. Pedro believes that Sara knew all of Dante and Deborah's plans. Julieta blames Simón for Sara's accident. Cornelio confesses to Juan that Pedro had ordered for him to get killed. Pedro tells Sara that Déborah and Dante are lovers.
| 66 | "Sara no resiste el encanto de Juan y lo besa" | 27 June 2022 | 4 October 2022 | 3.0 | 1.27 |
Sara assures Pedro that the accusations about her mother are a lie. Mateo confirms that Julieta's son is not Juan's. Juan confronts Pedro about the rumors of wanting to kill Cornelio, but Pedro denies everything. Mateo feigns a truce with Julieta after learning the DNA results. Déborah returns to her daughter's apartment after leaving the hospital and Sara asks her if she is Dante's lover, as Pedro told her. Déborah points to Próspero Millán as the culprit of her poisoning. Pedro confronts Déborah because he already knows that Sara is not Severiano Del Monte's daughter. Juan talks to Sara to tell her that their separation was due to the threats he received.
| 67 | "Pedro sabe el secreto de Sara" | 28 June 2022 | 5 October 2022 | 3.3 | 1.53 |
Pedro proposes to Déborah to get rid of Sara's child in exchange for not revealing the name of Sara's real father. Simón looks for Paloma in the cantina and makes a scandal when he sees her singing. Pedro keeps imagining that his mother is everywhere and begins to lose control. Cornelio reveals to Modesto that he was an accomplice to Victorio's attack on the farm out of hatred for Pedro. Dante asks Juan to take care of Sara now that he will be away from the farm. Pedro reveals to Sara that he knows of her pregnancy. Jessica humiliates Brayan and asks for a divorce. The Del Monte's are ready to celebrate their father's birthday, despite his absence, but Simón suffers a crisis and reveals to be Severiano's murderer.
| 68 | "Se destapa la verdad sobre tres hijos" | 29 June 2022 | 6 October 2022 | 3.4 | 1.39 |
Simón describes everything that happened on the day of his father's accident and assures that he is to blame for everything; however, he receives the support of all his siblings. Sara talks to Simón to try to calm his pain and wishes that soon he can stop hating her. Déborah looks for Próspero to try to find out if he was the one who poisoned her. Pedro reveals to his brothers that Sara is pregnant and Juan will be a father of two children. Déborah confronts Dante for supposedly poisoning her, slaps him and tells him that Pedro already knows that Sara is not Severiano's daughter. Juan snubs Julieta at his father's mass. Chavita tells Próspero that he suspects that Cornelio may have poisoned Déborah. Adela cannot find the chest with Rosa's letters. Déborah tries to give tea to Sara, but regrets it at the last minute. During the baby shower, Mateo and Lucas carry out their plan to make Julieta confess the truth in front of everyone.
| 69 | "Una nueva oportunidad para amar" | 30 June 2022 | 7 October 2022 | 3.2 | 1.42 |
Julieta admits to everyone that Mateo is the father of her son, Juan is furious with her for hiding this news and will divorce her. Julieta loses control and Juan throws her out of the farm forever. Mateo seeks out Julieta for what happened, but she threatens to never let him see his son. Dante tells Sara that she is a great woman, Sara thanks him for the gesture and hugs him. Juan arrives at Sara's apartment to tell her what happened with Julieta and asks her to resume their relationship. Pedro lashes out at Dante for not putting him in the presidential chair and ends up killing him. Juan promises Sara to give up the inheritance if she returns to his side. The Milláns worry about Julieta's condition. Déborah arrives at Santa Catalina and breaks the Del Monte painting, Simon is furious and throws her out of the farm. Paloma slaps Déborah for speaking ill of her mother. Déborah reveals that Paloma is Severiano's daughter. Sara interrupts her mother to announce that she will make her life with Juan for the good of her family.
| 70 | "Rupturas y reencuentros" | 1 July 2022 | 10 October 2022 | 2.9 | 1.41 |
Sara surprises her mother with her decision to return to Juan. Deborah finds Rosa's letters in the chapel of the farm. Sara looks for Simón to make peace. Pedro warns Déborah that if she does not get rid of Sara's son, he could kill both of them. Paloma overhears her father and Agustín's conversation in which Chavita doubts that he is Paloma's biological father. Sara talks to the Del Monte's about the possibility of returning to Santa Catalina to form a family together, but Pedro's refusal surprises everyone. Pedro imagines Dante at the farm and begins to freak out. Brayan is opposed to revealing to Juan everything that happened with Pedro for fear of what will happen to his family. Pedro takes Dante's body in the middle of the farm to bury him.
| 71 | "Los Del Monte están malditos" | 4 July 2022 | 11 October 2022 | 3.1 | 1.52 |
Juan confesses to Sara that Pedro is the owner of Campo Verde and the one who stole from the company. Adela and Jessica doubt the possibility that Brayan has resigned from the farm because of Pedro. Agustín assures that Rosa was indeed Severiano Del Monte's lover. Lucas and Alondra spend the night together after his crisis because of Victorio. Sara informs her mother that she will return to the farm without her because she is manipulative and Déborah slaps her. Déborah blames Dante for her poisoning. Cornelio convinces Brayan to talk to Juan so that he will reveal the torture he was the victim of at the hands of Pedro. Julieta shows up at the company and loses control when she sees Sara at Juan's side, threatening to end her son's life. Próspero arrives with a team of doctors to attend to his daughter's psychological state. Cornelio and Brayan arrive at the farm to throw Pedro out, but are beaten up by Pedro. Pedro arrives at the Cruz's house after arguing with Brayan and Cornelio to kick them out of the Del Monte property.
| 72 | "Todo cae por su propio peso" | 5 July 2022 | 12 October 2022 | 3.3 | 1.51 |
Juan arrives at the Cruz's house to find out what happened, Brayan reveals in front of everyone that Pedro tortured him. Pedro assures everyone that none of what he Brayan said was true and takes them to the shed where there is no proof of anything. Juan tries to convince the Cruz's to stay in the house they live in Santa Catalina, but they prefer to leave. Simón admits that his relationship with Sara has improved. Mateo confronts Pedro for what he did to the Cruz's, but Sara tries to calm the situation and only receives insults from Pedro. Dante's wife arrives at Santa Catalina because she does not know his whereabouts. Déborah tries to humiliate Paloma by reminding her of her origin, but Paloma ends up kicking her out of Santa Catalina. Juan gathers his brothers to tell them about their problems and of Pedro's behavior, but they are overheard by Pedro.
| 73 | "Regar veneno" | 6 July 2022 | 13 October 2022 | 3.0 | 1.59 |
Déborah threatens Pedro with harming Tadeo if he hurts Sara or her son, but also confesses to him that she knows all about his frauds along with Dante. Julieta Baby confesses her feelings to Mateo, but he can't reciprocate as she wants him to. Brayan tells Jessica that he was tormented by Pedro. Próspero asks Juan to leave his daughter Julieta alone. Julieta returns to her family's side. Juan and Sara spend the night together, but he asks her if she wants to stay by his side in Santa Catalina. Pedro accepts that he did the fraud in the company, he assures that the idea was Dante's, but his brothers do not believe him and they get another surprise when Pedro admits that he is the owner of Campo Verde. Julieta returns to Santa Catalina and asks Mateo to forgive her for what she did to their son. Déborah arrives at the Millán's vow renewal to read Rosa's letters to Severiano in front of everyone. Sara visits Santa Catalina and Pedro reveals to her that she is not Severiano Del Monte's daughter, but Dante's daughter.
| 74 | "Una profunda decepción" | 7 July 2022 | 14 October 2022 | 3.2 | 1.42 |
Sara does not believe Pedro's accusations, but he assures her that if she does not leave the farm he will end up killing her. Rosa asks Próspero not to believe Déborah, but Próspero leaves from the vow renewal ceremony. Juan confronts Pedro to find out if he helped Julieta to alter the DNA test and a strong argument breaks out with Mateo. Pedro admits to Juan that he is haunted by the memory of his mother. Julieta is surprised to read her mother's letters to Severiano Del Monte. Sara kicks her mother out of the house after having lied to her about her father. Rosa is fed up with the life she leads and is ready to get rid of all her prejudices. Déborah leaves her house and vows to take revenge on Pedro.
| 75 | "No formo parte de esta familia" | 8 July 2022 | 17 October 2022 | 3.0 | 1.64 |
Sara lies to Juan when she tells him that she argued with Déborah because she thought Severiano didn't care about her. Julieta admits to Mateo that she was wrong in how she treated him. Simón threatens John with denouncing Pedro for everything he has done. Julieta is convinced to rebuild her life with Mateo and asks him to marry her. Juan tries to stop the workers who invaded Santa Catalina, but Pedro prevents him. The Del Monte's confront Pedro and in the discussion Sara reveals that she is not Severiano's daughter. Próspero arrives home and asks Rosa for a divorce. Despite Sara's explanations, the Del Monte brothers think that she and their mother planned everything to keep their father's inheritance. Déborah reveals all of Pedro's secrets to Cornelio. Tadeo begins to worry about her attitude. Juan and Sara look for Déborah to warn her of the coming accusation against her, but she surprises them by assuring them that Pedro killed Dante. Julieta confronts her mother to find out if what the letters to Severiano say are the truth and Rosa accepts that Julieta is a Del Monte. Sara tries to apologize to the Del Monte family for what happened, but Pedro reveals that Sara's real father is Dante Alamillo.
| 76 | "Ustedes decidan mi destino" | 11 July 2022 | 18 October 2022 | 3.4 | 1.57 |
Julieta is furious with her mother when she learns that she is Severiano Del Monte's daughter. Simón asks Sara to remove her Del Monte name. Lucas is willing to put himself at risk to get the truth out of Pedro. The Del Monte's find Déborah in Santa Catalina and threaten to sue her for deceiving them about Sara's origin. Modesto tells Pedro that he knows his secret about Aurora's death, Pedro denies that he took Aurora's life. Mateo informs his brothers that he plans to make his life at Julieta's side. Modesto is beaten by Pedro, but the appearance of Tadeo causes him to stop, however he threatens Modesto. Mateo proposes to Julieta, but she confesses that she has brain cancer. Rosa arrives at the cantina to apologize to Brayan for all the insults against him. Juan confronts Pedro because he wants to know the reason for Dante's disappearance.
| 77 | "Muerte en Santa Catalina" | 12 July 2022 | 19 October 2022 | 3.5 | 1.65 |
Juan doubts Pedro's word and believes he is guilty of what happened with Dante. Julieta looks for Sara and reveals that she has cancer. Juan receives a call from the bank to announce that Dante's computer is at his disposal. Julieta tells Próspero that she is a Del Monte. Deborah tries to humiliate Rosa, but is surprised to learn that Julieta is a Del Monte. Próspero confronts Rosa when he learns that Julieta is not his daughter and decides to kick her out of the house. Lucas tries to support Pedro and manages to obtain the audios that Henry sent him. Juan opens the documents left by Dante and respects the will to see the video he left in the company of all the Del Monte family. Agustín meets Pedro in the Santa Catalina lands and after an argument, Pedro kills Agustín.
| 78 | "Pedro es el dueño de todo" | 13 July 2022 | 20 October 2022 | 3.6 | 1.39 |
Rosa complains to Julieta for having told Próspero the whole truth. The Cruz family arrives at Santa Catalina and find Agustín dead and during the wake, Adela accuses Pedro of being a murderer and a strong argument breaks out. Juan arrives at his office and discovers that Dante's laptop is not in the safe. Julieta confesses to her sisters that she is Severiano Del Monte's daughter and acknowledges that Próspero is her only father. A fight breaks out at Paloma and Beatriz's performance in which Sara ends up stabbed. Simón has to donate blood to save Sara's life. Sara loses her son after being stabbed and after being sedated, Juan reveals to Sara that Simón donated blood to save her, which causes them to forgive each other. After the discussion with Juan, Pedro reveals that he is the new owner of the company Campo verde Del Monte, but also reveals that Julieta is Severiano's daughter.
| 79 | "Que comience la fiesta en Santa Catalina" | 14 July 2022 | 21 October 2022 | 3.5 | 1.56 |
Julieta admits that what Pedro said is true, but defends herself by assuring that he was behind altering her baby's DNA studies. Modesto confesses Pedro's secret to Juan. The Del Monte's begin excavating part of Santa Catalina and discover Aurora's body. Pedro is ready to escape with Tadeo, arrives at Santa Catalina, confesses his crimes and shoots Juan. Sara tells Déborah that she has hurt her a lot, which is why they decide to separate. Julieta apologizes to Sara for the harm she caused her. The Del Monte family learns the contents of Dante's USB and are surprised by everything that he narrates. Pedro returns to Santa Catalina and manages to capture Sara. Pedro kidnaps Sara and Julieta, but agrees to free them in exchange for the lives of his brothers. Tadeo is abandoned by Pedro, but Déborah finds him and she threatens Pedro with harming him if he does anything to Sara.
| 80 | "Siempre triunfa el amor" | 15 July 2022 | 24 October 2022 | 3.6 | 1.99 |
Sara and Julieta are held hostage by Pedro, but Déborah's sudden appearance threatening Pedro with harming Tadeo causes them to flee from him. Pedro confronts his brothers in the middle of Santa Catalina and is wounded by Déborah. Juan follows Pedro, but when he arrives at the house where they lived with Aurora, he discovers that Pedro ingested poison. Three months after Pedro's death, the Del Monte siblings celebrate the union they have longed for since the absence of Catalina and Severiano. Juan and Sara get married. Mateo remembers the moment when he said goodbye to Julieta and visits her tomb. Pedro was to blame for Severiano's death. Rosa was the one who sent the poisoned bottle of wine to Déborah. While Déborah ends up with a new identity and conquering more millionaire men, Sara enjoys peace with the Del Monte family and is pregnant with Juan's son.
