= Corazón que miente =

Mexican telenovela

- Genre: Telenovela
- Based on: Laberintos de pasión by Cuauhtémoc Blanco and María del Carmen Peña
- Screenplay by: Antonio Abascal; Carlos Daniel González; Dante Hernández
- Story by: Caridad Bravo Adams
- Directed by: José Elías Moreno; Mauricio Rodríguez
- Creative director: Gabriela Barbosa
- Starring: Thelma Madrigal; Pablo Lyle; Diego Olivera; Mayrín Villanueva; Alexis Ayala; Alejandro Tommasi; Dulce María; María Sorté; Lourdes Reyes
- Theme music composer: Alberto Fortis; Evelyn de la Luz
- Opening theme: "Corazón Que Miente" by David Bisbal
- Ending theme: "Dejarte De Amar" by Dulce María
- Country of origin: Mexico
- Original language: Spanish
- No. of seasons: 1
- No. of episodes: 70

Production
- Executive producer: Mapat L. de Zatarain
- Producer: Marco Vinicio
- Cinematography: Óscar Morales; Bernardo Nájera; Marco Vinicio
- Editors: Ioma Carmona; Mauricio Coronel; Gabriela Torres; Pablo Peralta
- Camera setup: Multi-camera
- Production company: Televisa

Original release
- Network: Canal de las Estrellas
- Release: 8 February – 14 May 2016

Related
- A que no me dejas; Las amazonas

Corazón que miente (English: Lying Heart) is a Mexican telenovela produced by Mapat L. de Zatarain for Televisa. It is a remake of the telenovela Laberintos de pasión produced in 1999 by Ernesto Alonso. It is created by Caridad Bravo Adams and developed by Cuauhtémoc Blanco and Maria del Carmen Peña. The series originally aired from February 8, 2016 to May 14, 2016.

The series stars Thelma Madrigal as Mariela, Pablo Lyle as Alonso, Diego Olivera as Leonardo, Mayrín Villanueva as Lucía, Alexis Ayala as Daniel, Alejandro Tommasi as Démian, Dulce María as Renata, María Sorté as Carmen and Lourdes Reyes as Rafaela.

== Plot ==
Mariela Salvatierra is orphaned at the age of 12, after losing her grandfather, Manuel, a death she believes was caused by Démian Ferrer. As his protégé, Mariela leaves the city with Leonardo Del Río, a man who believes that Démian is also the murderer of the death of Lucía, Démian's wife. Fifteen years later, the two return to avenge the deaths of their loved ones while meeting great obstacles: one being that Ferrer is a powerful, unprincipled and perfidious man who not only takes pleasure in others' downfall, but he also does not even care about the well being of his family. Mariela falls in love with Démian's eldest son, Alonso, whom she was friends with as children. Mariela and Alonso have to fight all the external forces that compromise their relationship in order to live their love story.

== Cast ==
=== Main ===
- Thelma Madrigal as Mariela Salvatierra Morán
- Pablo Lyle as Alonso Ferrer Castellanos
- Diego Olivera as Leonardo del Río Solórzano
- Mayrín Villanueva as Lucía Castellanos Sáenz
- Alexis Ayala as Daniel Ferrer Bilbatúa
- Alejandro Tommasi as Demián Ferrer Bilbatúa
- Dulce María as Renata Ferrer Jáuregui
- María Sorté as Carmen Oceguera
- Lourdes Reyes as Rafaela del Moral Sáenz

=== Recurring ===
- Alejandro Ávila as Rogelio Medina Sánchez
- Gerardo Murguía as Eduardo Moliner Arredondo
- Eric del Castillo as Manuel Salvatierra Teri
- Ricardo Margaleff as Cristian Mena Souza
- Alejandra Procuna as Elena Solís Saldívar
- Vanesa Restrepo as Denise Shapiro Berlanga
- Alejandra Jurado as Amalia González de Valvidia
- Jorge Ortín as Noé Valvidia Pérez
- Fátima Torre as Leticia "Lety" Valdivia González
- Federico Ayos as Santiago Ferrer Castellanos
- Emmanuel Palomares as Lisandro Moliner Bustos
- David Palacio as Julio Solís Saldívar
- Jessica Mas as Karla Bustos de Moliner
- Valentina Azouri as Mariela Salvatierra Morán (young)
- Santiago Torres Jaimes as Santiago Ferrer Castellanos (young)
- Nikolás Caballero as Alonso Ferrer Castellanos (young)
- Monserrat Gim as Leticia "Lety" Valdivia González (young)
- Jessica Decote as Florencia Moliner Bustos
- Mónica Zorti as Marcia
- Jessica Segura as Cirila Reyes Medina
- Benjamín Islas as Mario Preciado
- Ricardo Vera as Preciado
- Iliana de la Garza as Eva
- Ricardo Guerra as Sanabria
- Vicente Torres as Ponciano
- Helena Rojo as Sara Sáenz de Castellanos

== Episodes ==
No. overall	No. in season	Title	Original release date
1	1	"¡El corazón sigue latiendo!"	February 8, 2016
2	2	"¡Lucía decidida a terminar su matrimonio!"	February 9, 2016
3	3	"¡Lucía y Leonardo se besan!"	February 10, 2016
4	4	"¡La muerte de Manuel!"	February 11, 2016
5	5	"¡Corazón en fuga!"	February 15, 2016 (Note: Episode 5 did not air on February 12, due to Papal visit, instead it aired on February 15.)
6	6	"¡La muerte de Lucía!"	February 16, 2016
7	7	"¡El collar de corazón!"	February 17, 2016
8	8	"¡Mariela y Alonso se rencuentran!"	February 18, 2016
9	9	"Leonardo enfrentará al pasado"	February 19, 2016
10	10	"Renata, una mina de oro"	February 22, 2016
11	11	"Marcela y Alonso desempolvan el pasado"	February 23, 2016
12	12	"Renata en conquista de los Ferrer"	February 24, 2016
13	13	"Mariela encara a Demián"	February 25, 2016
14	14	"Del odio nace el amor"	February 26, 2016
15	15	"Santiago en problemas de amor"	February 29, 2016
16	16	"Alonso besa a Renata"	March 1, 2016
17	17	"Mariela, en la mira de todos"	March 2, 2016
18	18	"Denise desata los celos de Mariela"	March 3, 2016
19	19	"Leonardo, ¿enamorado?"	March 4, 2016
20	20	"Julio contra Rogelio"	March 7, 2016
21	21	"La decisión de Lisandro"	March 8, 2016
22	22	"Rafaela en contra de Demián"	March 9, 2016
23	23	"Sara sospechará de Demián"	March 10, 2016
24	24	"¡Cristian y Lisandro se conocen!"	March 11, 2016
25	25	"Renata al descubierto"	March 14, 2016
26	26	"El amor entre Alonso y Mariela"	March 15, 2016
27	27	"¿Alonso o Leonardo?"	March 16, 2016
28	28	"Leonardo sufre por amor"	March 17, 2016
29	29	"¡Florencia cancela la boda!"	March 18, 2016
30	30	"¡Santiago sufre un aparatoso accidente!"	March 21, 2016
31	31	"¡Demián es un monstruo!"	March 22, 2016
32	32	"Alonso y su propuesta de amor"	March 23, 2016
33	33	"Un compromiso que lo cambiará"	March 24, 2016
34	34	"¡Leonardo confiesa su amor!"	March 25, 2016
35	35	"¡Leonardo se va!"	March 28, 2016
36	36	"El punto débil de Renata"	March 29, 2016
37	37	"El sucio plan de Rogelio"	March 30, 2016
38	38	"¡El día de la boda llegó!"	March 31, 2016
39	39	"El sacrificio de Mariela"	April 1, 2016
40	40	"El amor de Alonso se convierte en odio"	April 4, 2016
41	41	"¡El padre de Mariela aparece!"	April 5, 2016
42	42	"¡Daniel se entera de la verdad!"	April 6, 2016
43	43	"Rafaela en manos de Rogelio"	April 7, 2016
44	44	"¡Florencia muere!"	April 8, 2016
45	45	"Leonardo regresa por Mariela"	April 11, 2016
46	46	"Lisandro y Cristian comienzan una relación"	April 12, 2016
47	47	"Renata quiere el corazón y el dinero de Alonso"	April 13, 2016
48	48	"Eduardo atropella a Rogelio"	April 14, 2016
49	49	"Santiago es operado"	April 15, 2016
50	50	"La confesión de Rogelio"	April 18, 2016
51	51	"Daniel en busca de la verdad"	April 19, 2016
52	52	"¡Leonardo y Mariela se besan!"	April 20, 2016
53	53	"Santiago y Lety se hacen novios"	April 21, 2016
54	54	"Antonio en la mira de Demián"	April 22, 2016
55	55	"¡Demián ataca a Daniel!"	April 25, 2016
56	56	"Lisandro tras la verdad"	April 26, 2016
57	57	"Alonso y Renata se comprometen"	April 27, 2016
58	58	"Cris deja a Lisandro"	April 28, 2016
59	59	"Renata destruye la hermandad de los Ferrer"	April 29, 2016
60	60	"¡Rogelio y Demián en apuros!"	May 2, 2016
61	61	"El funeral de Daniel"	May 3, 2016
62	62	"La carta de Lucía"	May 4, 2016
63	63	"¡Leonardo es el padre de Alonso!"	May 5, 2016
64	64	"Leonardo en la mira de Demián"	May 6, 2016
65	65	"Leonardo renuncia al amor de Mariela"	May 9, 2016
66	66	"Demián deja Quadrum"	May 10, 2016
67	67	TBA	May 11, 2016
68	68	"¡Mariela es secuestrada!"	May 12, 2016
69	69	TBA	May 13, 2016
70	70	TBA	May 14, 2016

== Awards and nominations ==
Year	Award	Category	Nominated	Result
2016	Premios Televisa.Com	Mejor Pareja de la Pantalla	Pablo Lyle and Thelma Madrigal	Nominated
2016	Premios Televisa.Com	La Villana del Año	Dulce María	Won
2016	TV Adicto Golden Awards	Mejor adaptación	Corazón que Miente	Won
2017	35th TVyNovelas Awards	Best Telenovela of the Year	Mapat L. de Zatarain	Nominated
2017	35th TVyNovelas Awards	Best Actor	Pablo Lyle	Nominated
2017	35th TVyNovelas Awards	Best Antagonist Actor	Alejandro Tommasi	Nominated
2017	35th TVyNovelas Awards	Best Leading Actor	Alexis Ayala	Nominated
2017	35th TVyNovelas Awards	Best Co-lead Actor	Diego Olivera	Nominated
2017	35th TVyNovelas Awards	Best Supporting Actress	María Sorté	Nominated
2017	35th TVyNovelas Awards	Best Female Revelation	Jéssica Segura	Nominated
2017	35th TVyNovelas Awards	Best Male Revelation	Federico Ayos	Nominated
2017	35th TVyNovelas Awards	Best Direction of the Camaras	Marco Vinicio, Óscar Morales and Bernardo Nájera	Nominated
