= Lorena Álvarez =

Mexican actress (born 1973)

- Born: Lorena Álvarez Trejo; January 10, 1973 (age 52); Mexico City, Mexico
- Occupation: Actress
- Years active: 1994-present

Lorena Álvarez (born Lorena Álvarez Trejo, January 10, 1973 in Mexico City, Mexico) is a Mexican actress.

== Filmography ==
Telenovelas, Series, Films, TV Show
Year	Title	Role	Notes
1994-95	Agujetas de color de rosa		Special appearance
1994-95	Volver a Empezar		Special appearance
1995	La Dueña		Supporting role
1995	A sangre fría		Film
1995	Crímenes de pasión		Film
1995-96	El premio mayor		Supporting role
1997	Al ritmo de la noche		TV show
1997	Herencia fatal		Film
1997	La perra		Film
1998-99	Cero en conducta		TV series
1999	Humor es... los comediantes		TV series
1999	La sentencia de un pesado		Film
2001-02	Salomé	Luisa	Supporting role
2003	Amor Real	Bernarda Aguirre	Supporting role
2004-05	Mujer de Madera	Dalia	Supporting role
2006	El güero, el tuerto y el cojo		Film
2007	Muchachitas como tú		Special appearance
2008	La Rosa de Guadalupe		TV series
2008-09	Juro Que Te Amo	Adelaida Lacayo	Supporting role
2009-10	Corazón salvaje		Supporting role
2010-11	Llena de amor		Supporting role
2012	Como dice el dicho		TV series
