= Juro Que Te Amo =

Mexican telenovela

- Genre: Telenovela; Romance; Drama
- Based on: Los Parientes Pobres by Liliana Abud
- Written by: Antonio Abascal; Carlos Daniel González; Rossana Ruiz; Marimar Oliver
- Screenplay by: Gabriela Ortigoza
- Directed by: Lily Garza; Mauricio Rodríguez
- Starring: Ana Brenda Contreras; José Ron; Patricia Navidad; Alejandro Ávila; Alexis Ayala
- Theme music composer: David Bisbal
- Opening theme: Juro que te amo performed by David Bisbal
- Country of origin: Mexico
- Original language: Spanish
- No. of episodes: 140

Production
- Executive producer: Mapat L. de Zatarain
- Producer: Marco Vinicio López de Zatarain
- Production locations: Filming; Televisa San Ángel; Mexico City, Mexico; Locations; Mexico City, Mexico; Puerta del cielo, Santa Clara del Cobre, Mexico
- Cinematography: Óscar Morales; Mauricio Manzano
- Camera setup: Multi-camera
- Running time: 41-44 minutes
- Production company: Televisa

Original release
- Network: Canal de las Estrellas
- Release: July 28, 2008 – February 6, 2009

Juro Que Te Amo (English title: I Swear I Love You) is a Mexican telenovela produced by Mapat L. de Zatarain for Televisa. It aired on Canal de las Estrellas from July 28, 2008, to February 6, 2009. It is a remake of the 1993 Mexican telenovela Los parientes pobres.

The telenovela stars Ana Brenda Contreras, José Ron, Patricia Navidad, Alejandro Ávila and Alexis Ayala.

== Plot ==
Violeta Madrigal is a beautiful girl who lives in a provincial town, Puerta del Cielo, with her parents, Amado and Antonia, her brothers Julio and Daniel, and her sister Lia. The family was the richest in town, but after losing their fortune they realized the hypocrisy of people who previously seemed to love and respect them. They face a lot of situations that lead to the town creating and spreading rumors about their family.

Justino Fregoso is the most powerful of the Madrigal family's former friends. He made his fortune through shady deals that ended the stability of the goldsmith company previously owned by the Madrigal family and caused them to be near bankruptcy. This new situation benefits his wife Malena Fregoso, who enjoys their new rich position, and their daughter Mariela, who takes every opportunity to humiliate Violeta.

Mariano Lazcano is a wealthy man who used to live in Puerta del Cielo and left for Mexico City after suffering heartbreak. He goes on to create a successful company and marries Leonora. They share three kids: Renato, Pablo, and Ivanna. After years of not seeing Antonia, he returns to Puerta del Cielo when she needs help with her family and company.

The lives of all three families will become entangled in different situations that will lead to love, drama, and heartbreak.

== Cast ==
=== Main ===
- Ana Brenda Contreras as Violeta Madrigal Campero
- Patricia Navidad as Antonia Campero de Madrigal/de Lazcano
- José Ron as José María Aldama
- Alejandro Ávila as Mariano Lazcano Madrigal
- Pepe Gámez as Julio Madrigal Campero
- Alexis Ayala as Justino Fregoso
- Lourdes Reyes as Malena de Fregoso
- Florencia del Saracho as Mariela Fregoso de Cueller
- Cecilia Gabriela as Leonora Cassis Zuloaga de Lazcáno
- Marcelo Córdoba as Maximiliano "Max" Cueller
- Mariana Karr as Fausta Zuloaga
- Liliana Goret as Ivanna Lazcano Cassis

=== Supporting ===
- Joana Brito as Jesusa Ponciano
- Hector Sáez as Toribo
- Xavier Marc as Padre Basilo Herrera
- José Elías Moreno as Rogelio Urbina
- Natasha Dupeyrón as Rosalía "Lía" Madrigal Campero
- Jessica Coch as Cristina de Urbina
- Alberto Agnesi as Renato Lazcano Cassis
- Imanol Landeta as Pablo Lazcano Cassis
- Osvaldo de León as Rodrigo Charolet
- Claudia Godinez as Celia
- Adriano Zendejas as Daniel Madrigal Campero
- Sury Sadai as Coralito
- Graciela Bernarndos as Adelina
- Cecilia Romo as Olvido
- Lorely Mancilla as Candela
- Roberto Miquel as Delfino
- Ariane Pellicer as Janis
- Antonio Escobar as Pantaleón
- Lorena Álvarez as Adelaida Lacayo
- Gerardo Murguía as Celestino Charolet

=== Guest stars ===
- Germán Gutiérrez as Dr. Alejandro Rangel
- Kelchie Arizmendi as Irma
- Luis José Santander as Amado Madrigal Pereira
- Francisco Rubio as Claudio Balcázar
- Lizzeta Romo as Florencia
- María Marcela as Sara
- Óscar Ortiz de Pinedo as Osciel
- Alejandra Jurado as Chona
- Sergio Mayer as Producer
- Mónica Garza as Gracia Lacayo
- Rocío Sobrado as Nurse
- Marco Muñoz as Andrés

== Awards ==
Year	Award	Category	Nominee	Result
2009	TVyNovelas Awards	Best Actor	Alejandro Avila	Nominated
2009	TVyNovelas Awards	Best Antagonist Actor	Alexis Ayala	Nominated
2009	TVyNovelas Awards	Best Young Lead Actor	José Ron	Nominated
