= Michelle Renaud =

Mexican actress (born 1988)

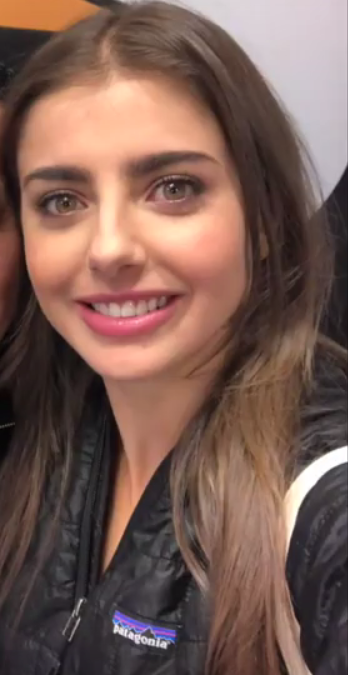
- Michelle Renaud in 2019
- Born: Michelle Renaud Ruesga; September 9, 1988 (age 37); Mexico City, Mexico
- Other names: Michelle Renaud
- Occupation: Actress
- Years active: 1992, 2006-present
- Spouses: Josue Alvarado (m. 2016; div. 2018); Matías Novoa (m. 2023)
- Children: 2

Michelle Renaud (born Michelle Renaud Ruesga; September 9, 1988) is a Mexican actress.

== Early life ==
Renaud debut was as a child in 1992 telenovela Ángeles sin paraíso. In 2004 returned to the telenovela Rebelde, she played "Michelle Pineda". In 2009 she played in the telenovela Camaleones with Belinda and Alfonso Herrera. The next years she played in the telenovelas Llena de Amor, Ni Contigo Ni Sin Ti and La Mujer del Vendaval.

In 2014, she appeared as special guest in the telenovela El Color de la Pasión. Later that year, she made her debut as a lead actress when she was cast in the telenovela La sombra del pasado with Pablo Lyle.

== Personal life ==
Renaud has two brothers. Her mother, who had stage 4 breast cancer, died from cancer in 2014. Renaud stated that there was no known history of breast cancer in her family prior to her mother's diagnosis. Since 2017, Renaud has appeared in advertisements to educate the public about breast cancer awareness in Mexico. She became vegan in 2010, following her mother’s cancer diagnosis.

She was married to Mexican restaurateur and musician Josué Alvarado from 2016 to 2018; they met through Renaud's brother and remained a couple for 6 years until their divorce. They married when Renaud was three months pregnant with her first child. They have one son, who was born in 2017. She later publicly accused Alvarado of being toxic during their marriage. She married Matias Novoa in a small ceremony in December 2023. She announced her pregnancy with her second child, a son, in early 2024. She and Novoa, decided to have a baby via IVF; Renaud underwent the procedure in late 2023. The couple decided to leave Mexico City and settle in Spain, where their first child is expected to be born in June 2024.

She is an avid painter in her spare time and shares her work with fans on her Instagram account.

== Filmography ==
Television
Year	Title	Role	Notes
1992	Ángeles sin paraíso		
2004–2006	Rebelde	Michelle Pineda	Recurring role
2009	Camaleones	Betina Montenegro	
2010	Llena de amor	Lorena Fonceca	"Deseo material" (Episode 15)
2011	Ni contigo ni sin ti	Concepción "Cony" Chamorro de Garnica	
2012–2013	La mujer del Vendaval	Alba María Morales	
2014	El color de la pasión	Young Rebeca Murillo Rodarte	Recurring role; 5 episodes
2014	Como dice el dicho	Analú	"Ni bebas agua que no veas" (Season 4, Episode 29)
2014–2015	La sombra del pasado	Aldonza Alcocer Lozada	Lead role
2015–2016	Pasión y poder	Regina Montenegro	
2017	Súper X	Vicky	
2018	Hijas de la luna	Juana Victoria Ramírez Nieto	Lead role
2019	La reina soy yo	Yamelí Montoya / Lari Andrade	Lead role
2020–2021	Quererlo todo	Valeria Fernandez	Lead role
2022	La herencia	Sara del Monte	Lead role
2025	Camino a Arcadia	Valeria	Main role

== Awards and nominations ==
=== TVyNovelas Awards ===
Year	Category	Telenovela	Result
2014	Best Young Lead Actress	La Mujer del Vendaval	Nominated
2015	Best Young Lead Actress	El color de la pasión	Nominated
2016	Best Actress	La sombra del pasado	Nominated
