= Por siempre mi amor =

Mexican telenovela

- Genre: Telenovela
- Created by: Nora Alemán; Denisse Pfeiffer; Gabriela Ortigoza
- Written by: Julián Aguilar; Ricardo Tejeda
- Story by: Eric Vonn; Abel Santa Cruz
- Directed by: Ana Lorena Pérez Ríos; Édgar Ramírez; Eduardo Said
- Creative director: Martha Ladrón de Guevara
- Starring: Susana González; Guy Ecker; Dominika Paleta; Héctor Suárez Gomís; Ana Martín
- Theme music composer: Mauricio Arriaga; Jorge Eduardo Murguía
- Opening theme: "Para enamorarme de ti" performed by David Bisbal
- Country of origin: Mexico
- Original language: Spanish
- No. of episodes: 151

Production
- Executive producer: Ignacio Sada
- Producers: José Antonio Arvizú; Bosco Primo de Rivera
- Production location: Mexico City, México
- Cinematography: Claudio Lara; Jesús Nájera; Gabriel Vázquez Bulman
- Editors: Israel Flores; Víctor Hugo Flores
- Camera setup: Multi-camera

Original release
- Network: Canal de las Estrellas
- Release: October 7, 2013 – May 4, 2014

Related
- Wild at Heart; The Stray Cat; Mi segunda madre

Por siempre mi amor (English title: Forever Yours) is a Mexican telenovela produced by Ignacio Sada for Televisa. It is a remake of Mi segunda madre, produced by Juan Osorio in 1989.

Susana González and Guy Ecker star as the protagonists, while Thelma Madrigal and Pablo Lyle star as the co-protagonists. Dominika Paleta, Héctor Suárez Gomís, Sofía Castro and Lola Merino star as the antagonists.

== Plot ==
Arturo De La Riva is an architect who has been happily married to Eugenia for ten years, and they have a daughter, Aranza. However they do not imagine that Sonia, Eugenia's cousin, is secretly obsessively in love with Arturo and secretly hates Eugenia for that and tries to get rid of her by secretly switching Eugenia's medications, causing her a coma, to have Arturo for herself.

Meanwhile, Isabel López Cerdán is an interior decorator who has been married to Fernando Córdova for two years.

Eugenia passes away, coinciding with the time Isabel discovers that Fernando is a swindler who has been stealing her money and also has been married to a young woman named Andrea for ten years and has two sons with her, Esteban and Angel, the latter having been born while Fernando was supposedly married with Isabel, so Isabel has him sent to jail.

After these blows, Isabel and Arturo are united by destiny in a paradise-like beach of Mexico, initiating a relation that will have to overcome different obstacles like Sonia's manipulation of Aranza, so that she does not accept Isabel and also Fernando who escapes from jail to get revenge on both Isabel and Andrea.

== Cast ==
=== Main ===
- Susana González - Isabel López Cerdán de De la Riva
- Guy Ecker - Arturo De la Riva Acevedo
- Dominika Paleta - Sonia Arenas Lozano
- Héctor Suárez Gomís - Fernando Córdova Miranda / Javier Castillo de la Fuente
- Ana Martín - María Luisa "Tita" Valverde Vda. de Escudero
- Zuria Vega - Eloisa De La Riva

=== Also main ===
- Martha Julia - Gabriela "Gaby" San Román
- Macaria - Minerva Gutiérrez
- Humberto Elizondo - Osvaldo de la Riva
- Luz María Zetina - Eugenia Arenas de De la Riva
- Lola Merino - Marcela Zambrano
- Víctor Noriega - Fabricio De la Riva Oropeza
- Gabriela Platas - Andrea Gutiérrez de Córdova / de Narváez
- Alejandro Ruiz - Bruno Escudero Valverde
- Alejandro Aragon - Mauricio Narváez
- Isabel Martínez "La Tarabilla" - Cuca
- Carlos Bonavides - Padre Adalberto
- Ricardo de Pascual - Gabino Hidalgo
- Dacia González - Lucha de Hidalgo
- Archie Lafranco - Nicolás Belmonte
- Dacia Arcaráz - Ágatha
- Elena Torres - Almudena Quijano de Escudero
- Silvia Lomelí - Teresa
- Thelma Madrigal - Aranza De la Riva Arenas
- Pablo Lyle - Esteban Narváez Gutiérrez
- Tania Lizardo - Marianela
- Sofía Castro - Dafne Quintana Herrera
- Carlos Speitzer - Pablo Noriega "El Borlas"
- Jade Fraser - Ileana Portillo
- Erick Díaz - Cristian
- David Ostrosky - Gilberto Cervantes
- Pablo Cruz Guerrero - Daniel Cervantes Arenas

=== Special participation ===
- Francisco Rubio - Gonzalo Carbajal
- Emma Escalante - Gemma
- José Montini - Baltazar
- Alejandro Villeli - Efrén Gómez
- Juan Verduzco - Dr. Elías Carranza
- Karyme Hernández - Aranza (girl)
- Federico Porras - Esteban (boy)
- Camila Peña - Dafne (girl)
- Valentina Hauzori - Ileana (girl)

== Broadcast ==
Production of Por Siempre mi Amor officially started on August 15, 2013.

On October 7, 2013, Canal de las Estrellas started broadcasting Por Siempre mi Amor weekdays at 4:15pm, replacing Corazón indomable. The last episode was broadcast on May 4, 2014, with La Gata replacing it the following day.

On December 2, 2013, Univision started broadcasting Por Siempre mi Amor on weeknights at 8pm/7c, replacing one hour of Corazón Indomable. The last episode was broadcast on May 9, 2014, with two hours of De que te quiero, te quiero replacing it on May 12, 2014.

== Awards and nominations ==
| Year | Award | Category | Nominee | Result |
|---|---|---|---|---|
| 2014 | Premios Juventud | Best Theme Novelero | David Bisbal, “Para Enamorarte De Mi” | Nominated |
