= Alexis Ayala =

Mexican film, television, and stage actor

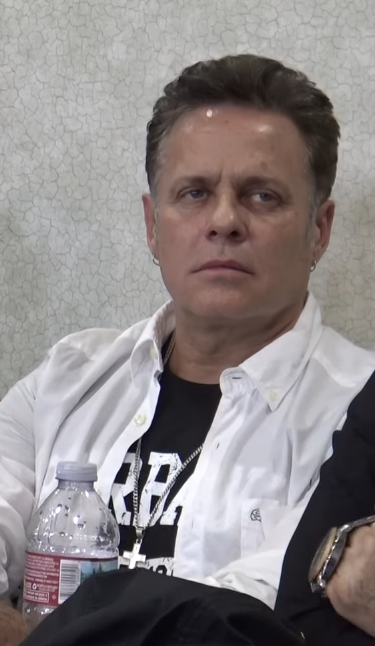
- Ayala in an interview with Dulce Osuna on 2 June 2017
- Born: August 9, 1965 (age 60); San Francisco, California, U.S.
- Occupation: Actor
- Spouses: Karla Álvarez (m. 1994; div. 1996) Fernanda López (m. 2014; div. 2021) Cinthia Aparicio (m. 2023)
- Children: 2

Alexis Ayala (born David Alexis Ayala Padró on 9 August 1965) is an American-born Mexican actor of telenovelas and the cinema of Mexico.

== Biography ==
=== Career ===
Ayala debuted as an actor at the age of 22 with the film En peligro de muerte ("In danger of death") and after completing his studies at the Centro de Educación Artística (CEA) of Televisa three years later he obtained a small role in Mi pequeña Soledad ("My little Soledad") with Verónica Castro.

In 1992, he appeared on Baila conmigo where he met Karla Álvarez, who he would later marry. Next year he obtained a more important role in the telenovela Los parientes pobres ("Poor Relatives"), a telenovela starred by singer Lucero. Both actors had shared the television screen in Cuando llega el amor ("When love arrives"). In 1999 he obtained his first starring role in Tres mujeres and with fellow actor and friend Sergio Mayer he produced the show Sólo para Mujeres where with Mayer and other celebrities they performed a strip-tease.

The show was successful and, in spite of local opposition from Catholic groups, they took the show on tour all over Mexico. The show was later presented in other Latin American countries and the United States. Although he is no longer part of the ever-changing cast, as of 2005 he remains a producer of the show.

== Filmography ==
List of acting performances in film and television
Title	Years	Role	Notes	Source
En peligro de muerte	1988		Film	
En carne propia	1990	Alejandro Tamaris	Television	
Mi pequeña Soledad	1990	Jorge "Coque"	Television	
Cuando llega el amor	1990	Nico	TV series	
Cadenas de amargura	1991	Víctor	TV series	
La pícara soñadora	1991	Carlos Pérez	Television	
Baila conmigo	1991	Tomás de la Reguera	Television	
Las cosas simples	1993		TV movie	
Los parientes pobres	1993	Bernardo Ávila	Television	
Agujetas de color de rosa	1994	Julián Ledezma	Television	
Confidente de secundaria	1996	Quico	Television	
Mujer, casos de la vida real	1996–01		Television, 2 episodes	
¡Engañame!, si quieres	1998	Ricardo	Film	
Huracán	1998	Raimundo	Television	
Tres mujeres	1999	Daniel Subiri	Television	
Carita de ángel	2000	Leonardo Larios	Television	
Atrévete a olvidarme	2001	Manuel Soto	Television	
Así son ellas	2002	Diego Montejo	Television	
Esclavo y amo	2003	Benjamín Solero	Film	
Fantasías	2003	Antonio	Film	
Amarte es mi pecado	2004	Leonardo Muñoz de Santiago	Television	
Cero y van 4	2004	Jorge Villalobo	Film	
Contra viento y marea	2005	Ricardo Sandoval	Television	
La última noche	2005	Cirujano	Film	
Barrera de amor	2005	Federico Gómez Valladolid	Television	
Yo amo a Juan Querendón	2007	César Luis Farell Carballo	Television	
Mejor es que Gabriela no se muera	2007		Film	
Mujeres asesinas	2007	Carlos Ocampo	Television, 1 episode	
Divina confusión	2008		Film	
Juro que te amo	2008–09	Justino Fregoso	Television	
El Pantera	2009	Comandante Orozco	Television, 2 episodes	
Cabeza de buda	2009	Guest #1	Film	
Gritos de muerte y libertad	2010	Corregidor Miguel Dominguez	Television	
Slaughter Weekend	2010	Toby	Film	
Llena de amor	2010–11	Lorenzo Porta-López / Lorenzo	Television	
From Prada to Nada	2011	Gabriel Dominguez Sr.	Film	
Abismo de pasión	2012	Edmundo Tovar	Television	
Me Late Chocolate	2013	Ricardo	Film	
Gossip Girl: Acapulco	2013	Emiliano Zaga	Television, 15 episodes	
Lo que la vida me robó	2013–14	Ezequiel Basurto	Television	
La sombra del pasado	2014–15	Severiano Mendonza	Television	
Corazón que miente	2016	Padre Daniel Ferrer Bilbatúa	Television	
Mujeres de negro	2016	Julio	Television	
Santiago Apostol	2017	Brujo Hermogenes	Film	
Hijas de la luna	2018	Darío Iriarte	Television	
Amar a muerte	2018–19	Léon Carvajal	Television	
Quererlo todo	2020–21	Artemio Cabrera	Television	
Si nos dejan	2021	Sergio Carranza	Television	
Vencer la ausencia	2022	Braulio Dueñas	Television	
Pienso en ti	2023	Federico Pérez	Television	
La historia de Juana	2024	Rogelio Fuenmayor	Television	
Más vale sola	2024	Gastón	Television	
Tan cerca de ti, nace el amor	2026	Aurelio Arellano	Television	

== Theater ==
- Sólo para Mujeres (1999) as himself Divorciemonos mi amor (2015) as Meliton
