= Fernando Cermeño =

Spanish actor

- Born: Fernando Cermeño Sánchez; November 11, 1980 (age 45); Ávila, Spain
- Other name: Fernando Sánchez
- Occupations: Actor, model

Fernando Cermeño Sánchez (born November 11, 1980, in Ávila) is a Spanish actor and model. He is known for participating in several telenovelas of Telemundo.

== Filmography ==
Television
Year	Title	Role	Notes
2008	El Rostro de Analía	Magnate Millonario	Supporting role
2010	El fantasma de Elena	Rómulo	Supporting role
2010	Aurora	Gastón	Supporting role
2011	La casa de al lado	Pablo López	Supporting role
2011	Una Maid en Manhattan	Rolando Lozano	Supporting role
2012	Corazón valiente	Gael Sánchez	Special participation
2014–15	La sombra del pasado	Joaquín	Main cast
2015	Como dice el dicho	Rodrigo	Guest appearance
2018	Fuel	Raúl	Main actor
