= Pablo Lyle =

Mexican actor (born 1986)

- Born: Pablo Daniel Lyle López; November 18, 1986 (age 39); Mazatlán, México
- Occupation: Actor
- Years active: 2006–2019
- Spouse: Ana Araujo (m. 2014)
- Children: 2

Pablo Daniel Lyle López (born November 18, 1986) is a Mexican actor.

== Career ==
After graduating from a Catholic school in his hometown, he started his career in modeling. In 2005, he started acting. His breakout role was in La Sombra del Pasado as the male lead protagonist. In 2015 Lyle was voted "Los 50 Más Bellos" ("50 Most Beautiful") by People en Español.

== Manslaughter charges ==
In April 2019, Lyle admitted to punching 63-year-old Juan Ricardo Hernández (of Cuban origin) in the face during a road rage incident in Miami, Florida. The victim was hospitalized and died four days after the attack. Lyle was charged with manslaughter after the elderly man died. He had been originally charged with battery before Hernández died. There is a video of the incident in which Lyle is seen running to punch Hernández. Lyle was convicted in October 2022. Lyle was sentenced to 5 years in state prison and 8 years probation in February 2023.

== Filmography ==
Film roles
Year	Title	Roles
2019	Mirreyes contra Godínez	Santi

Television roles
Year	Title	Roles	Notes
2009	Verano de amor	Baldomero Perea Olmos	Series regular; 120 episodes
2010	Mujeres asesinas	Marcelo	Episode: "Azucena, liberada"
2011–2012	Una familia con suerte	Pepe López Torrés	Series regular
2012	La rosa de Guadalupe	Cano	Episode: "Encontrar el camino"
2012	Cachito de cielo	Matías Salazar Silva / Matías Landeros Silva	Series regular; 102 episodes
2013	Como dice el dicho	Sandro	Episode: "Los deseos se cumplen"
2013–2014	Por siempre mi amor	Esteban Narváez Gutiérrez	Series regular; 110 episodes
2014–2015	La sombra del pasado	Cristóbal Mendoza Santana Rivero	Main role; 132 episodes
2016	Corazón que miente	Alonso Ferrer Castellanos	Main role; 62 episodes
2017	Mi adorable maldición	Rodrigo Villavicencio	Main role; 121 episodes
2017	Conan	Himself	Episode: "Conan Without Borders: Made in Mexico"
2017	Érase una vez	Esteban	Episode: "Blanca Nieves"
2019	Yankee	Malcolm Moriarty	Main role; 25 episodes
