= Lo mejor que me pasó en la vida =

Studio album by Alex Sirvent
- Released: December 12, 2013
- Recorded: 2012–2013
- Genre: Latin music, Latin pop
- Length: 46:52
- Label: Alman Music
- Producer: Alex Sirvent, Alberto Mantovani

Lo mejor que me pasó en la vida (English: The best thing that happened to me in life), is the first studio album by singer-songwriter Alex Sirvent. Launched on December 12, 2013, by Alman Music. Some of the songs on this album are part of the soundtrack of the telenovela Lo que la vida me robó.

== Track listing ==
No.	Title	Length
1.	"Gracias"	3:52
2.	"Junto a ti (feat. Ximena Herrera)"	3:33
3.	"Celos"	4:53
4.	"Bajemos la guardia"	3:56
5.	"Frío"	3:11
6.	"Todo va a estar bien"	4:38
7.	"Cruzaré mil mares (feat. Paola Márti)"	3:53
8.	"Sobran las palabras"	3:53
9.	"Volver a amar"	3:25
10.	"Cuentos de vaqueros"	3:13
11.	"Perdemos los dos"	5:22
12.	"Junto a ti"	3:15
