= Laura Carmine =

Puerto Rican actress

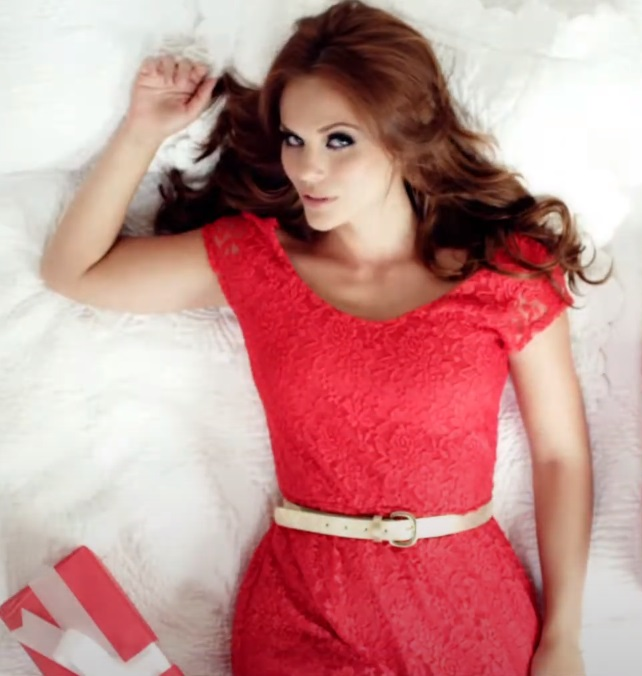
- Born: Laura Yliana Carmine Miranda; April 1, 1989 (age 37); San Juan, Puerto Rico
- Occupation: Actress
- Years active: 2008–present
- Height: 1.62 m (5 ft 4 in)

Laura Carmine (born Laura Yliana Carmine Miranda; April 2, 1989) is a Puerto Rican actress who resides in Mexico. She won the 2016 Premios TVyNovelas Best Antagonist Actress award for her portrayal as Nuria Murat in the 2015 telenovela, A que no me dejas.

== Early life ==
Carmine was born in San Juan, Puerto Rico, but soon moved with her family to Mexico. She was born with heterochromia iridum.

She obtained two degrees, one in advertising and marketing. In 2003, she began a master's degree in international marketing, but interrupted her studies in 2006 when she was accepted to Televisa's renowned Centro de Educación Artística (CEA).

== Career ==
Carmine began her television career in 2008, in exclusive programs at SKY México.

In 2011, Carmine landed her first lead role in the telenovela Ni contigo... ni sin ti, alongside Eduardo Santamarina. In 2012, she made a guest appearance on Por ella soy Eva. In that same year, she was cast in the telenovela Amor bravío, produced by Carlos Moreno, where she portrayed her first antagonist role as Ximena, the sister of Camila (played by Silvia Navarro). She also landed her second lead role in ¿Quién eres tú?, a remake of La usurpadora, where she played as the identical twin sisters Natalia and Veronica. In 2013, Carmine starred as the antagonist Esthercita in Salvador Mejía's La tempestad, with Ximena Navarrete and William Levy. In 2014, she also played a recurring role as Simona in Lucero Suárez's De que te quiero, te quiero, starring Livia Brito and Juan Diego Covarrubias.

In 2015, Carmine landed her most breakthrough role in Carlos Moreno's A que no me dejas. Nuria is the resentful and envious older sister of Paulina Murat (Camila Sodi). Carmine's portrayal of Nuria earned a nomination at the 34th Premios TVyNovelas where she won the award for Best Antagonist Actress (Mejor Villana). In 2016, she was also cast in José Alberto Castro's Vino el amor in a special guest role as Lisa, the beloved wife of David (Gabriel Soto) who was killed by her sister Graciela (Kimberly Dos Ramos). In 2017, she was cast as the main antagonist of Mi adorable maldición, produced by Ignacio Sada, and starring Renata Notni and Pablo Lyle.

In 2021, Carmine was part of José Alberto Castro's La desalmada, a highly-successful telenovela with a large ensemble cast headed by Livia Brito, José Ron and Eduardo Santamarina. She played as Ángela, a friendly and kind woman who is the best friend of Isabella (Kimberly Dos Ramos).

== Personal life ==
In 2016, Carmine was in a relationship with actor Adriano Zendejas, who is 13 years younger than her. They later broke up after ten months.

== Filmography ==
| Year | Title | Role | Notes | Ref. |
|---|---|---|---|---|
| 2011 | Ni contigo ni sin ti | Nicole Lorentti Tinoco | Lead role | |
| 2012 | Por ella soy Eva | Camila de Fairbanks | Guest role | |
| 2012 | Amor bravío | Ximena Díaz Santos | Supporting role | |
| 2012 | ¿Quién eres tú? | Natalia Garrido and Verónica Garrido de Esquivel | Lead role | |
| 2013 | Nueva vida | Linda | "Linda" (Season 1, Episode 3) | |
| 2013 | La Tempestad | Esthercita Salazar Mata | Main role | |
| 2014 | De que te quiero, te quiero | Simona Verduzco | Recurring role | |
| 2015 | Azul Violeta | Azul | Main role | |
| 2015 | A que no me dejas | Nuria Murat Urrutia | Main role | |
| 2016 | Vino el amor | Lisa Palacios de Robles | Guest role | |
| 2017 | Mi adorable maldición | Mónica "Monique" Solana Pineda | Main role | |
| 2018 | Por amar sin ley | Berenice Ortíz de Argudí | Guest role (season 1) | |
| 2019-20 | Médicos, línea de vida | Dr. Paulina Serrano Briceño | Guest role | |
| 2021 | La desalmada | Ángela Hinojosa | Main role | |
| 2022 | Vencer la ausencia | Lenar Ramirez | Supporting role | |
| 2024 | Juegos interrumpidos | Laura Suárez | Main role | |
| 2025 | A.mar, donde el amor teje sus redes | Erika | | |

== Awards and nominations ==
=== Premios TVyNovelas ===
| Year | Category | Telenovela | Result |
|---|---|---|---|
| 2012 | Best Female Revelation | Ni contigo ni sin ti | Won |
| 2013 | Best Co-lead Actress | Amor bravío | Nominated |
| 2016 | Best Antagonist Actress | A que no me dejas | Won |
