= 30th TVyNovelas Awards =

2012 Mexican TV awards

- Date: February 24, 2012
- Location: Mundo Imperial Forum, Acapulco, Guerrero
- Hosted by: Jacqueline Bracamontes, Alan Tacher & Ximena Navarrete
- Preshow hosts: In Mexico; Andrea Legarreta & Raúl Araiza; In United States; Mauricio Clark & Odalys Ramírez

Highlights
- Most awards: La fuerza del destino (5)
- Most nominations: Una familia con suerte (11)

Television/radio coverage
- Network: Canal de las Estrellas

The 30th TVyNovelas Awards were an academy of special awards to the best soap operas and TV shows. The awards ceremony took place on February 24, 2012 in the Mundo Imperial Forum, Acapulco, Guerrero. The ceremony was televised in Mexico by Canal de las Estrellas.

Jacqueline Bracamontes, Alan Tacher and Ximena Navarrete hosted the show. La fuerza del destino won 5 awards, the most for the evening, including Best Telenovela. Other winners Una familia con suerte won 4 awards, Triunfo del amor won 3 awards, La que no podía amar won 2 awards and Esperanza del corazón and Ni contigo ni sin ti won 1 each.

== Summary of awards and nominations ==
Telenovela	Nominations	Awards
Una familia con suerte	11	4
Triunfo del amor	9	3
La fuerza del destino	8	5
Esperanza del corazón	8	1
La que no podía amar	7	2
Dos hogares	7	0
Ni contigo ni sin ti	3	1
Amorcito corazón	3	0
Rafaela	3	0

== Winners and nominees ==
=== Telenovelas ===
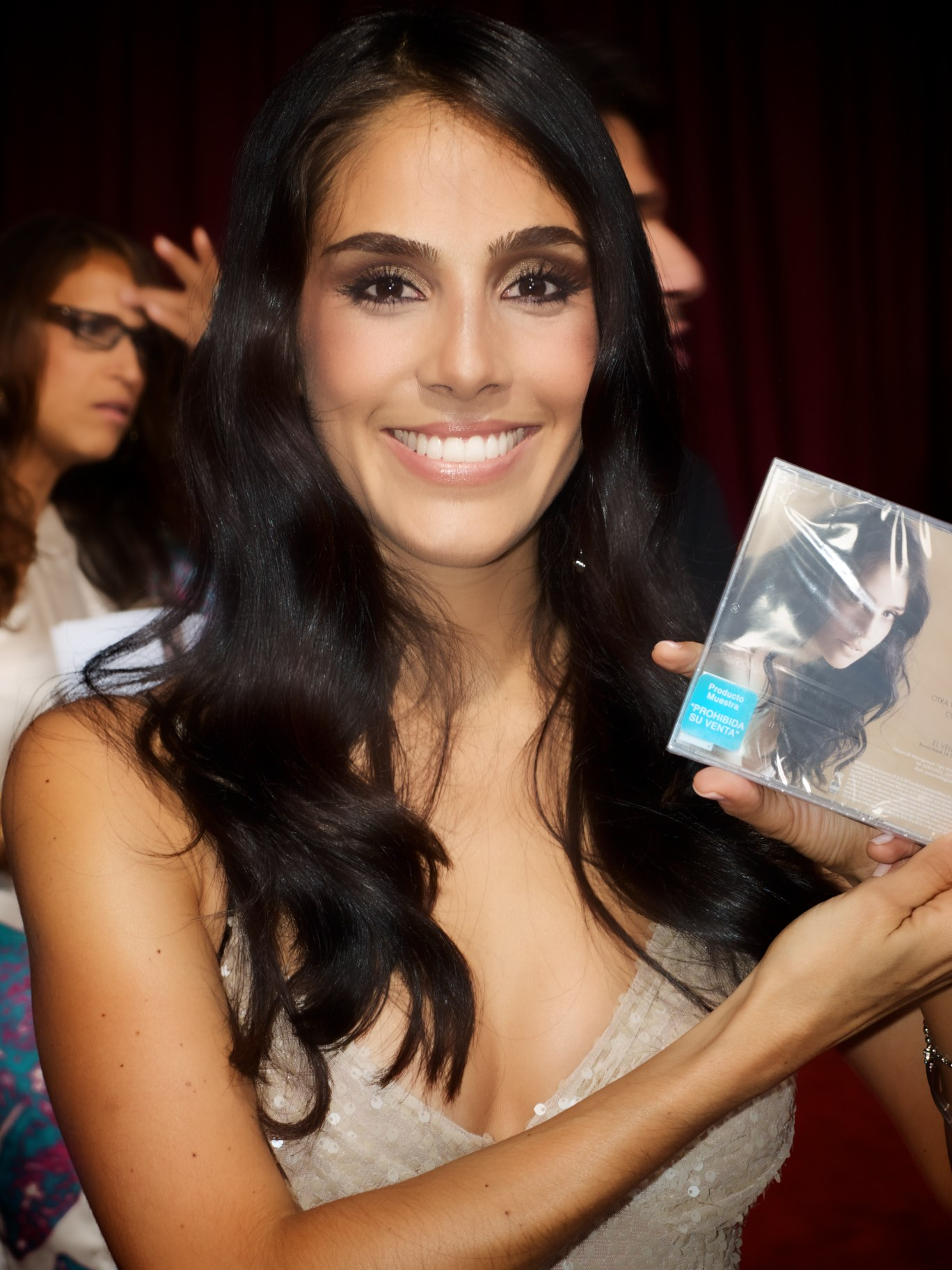
Sandra Echeverría, winner for Best Actress

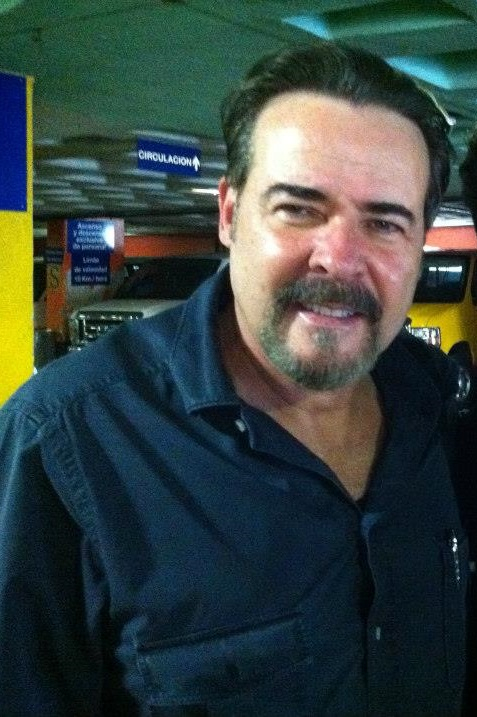
César Évora, winner for Best Leading Actor

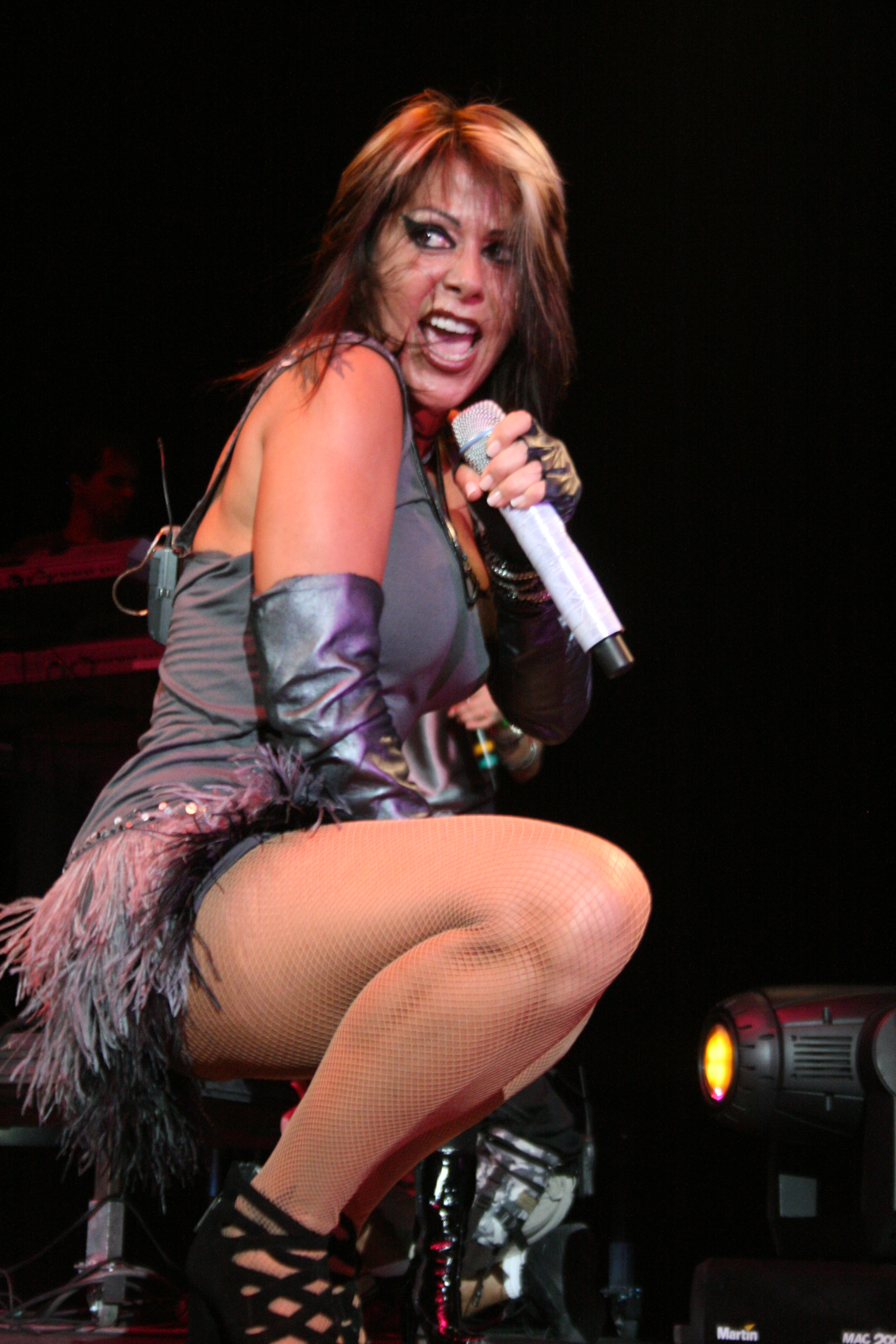
Alejandra Guzmán, winner for Best Musical Theme

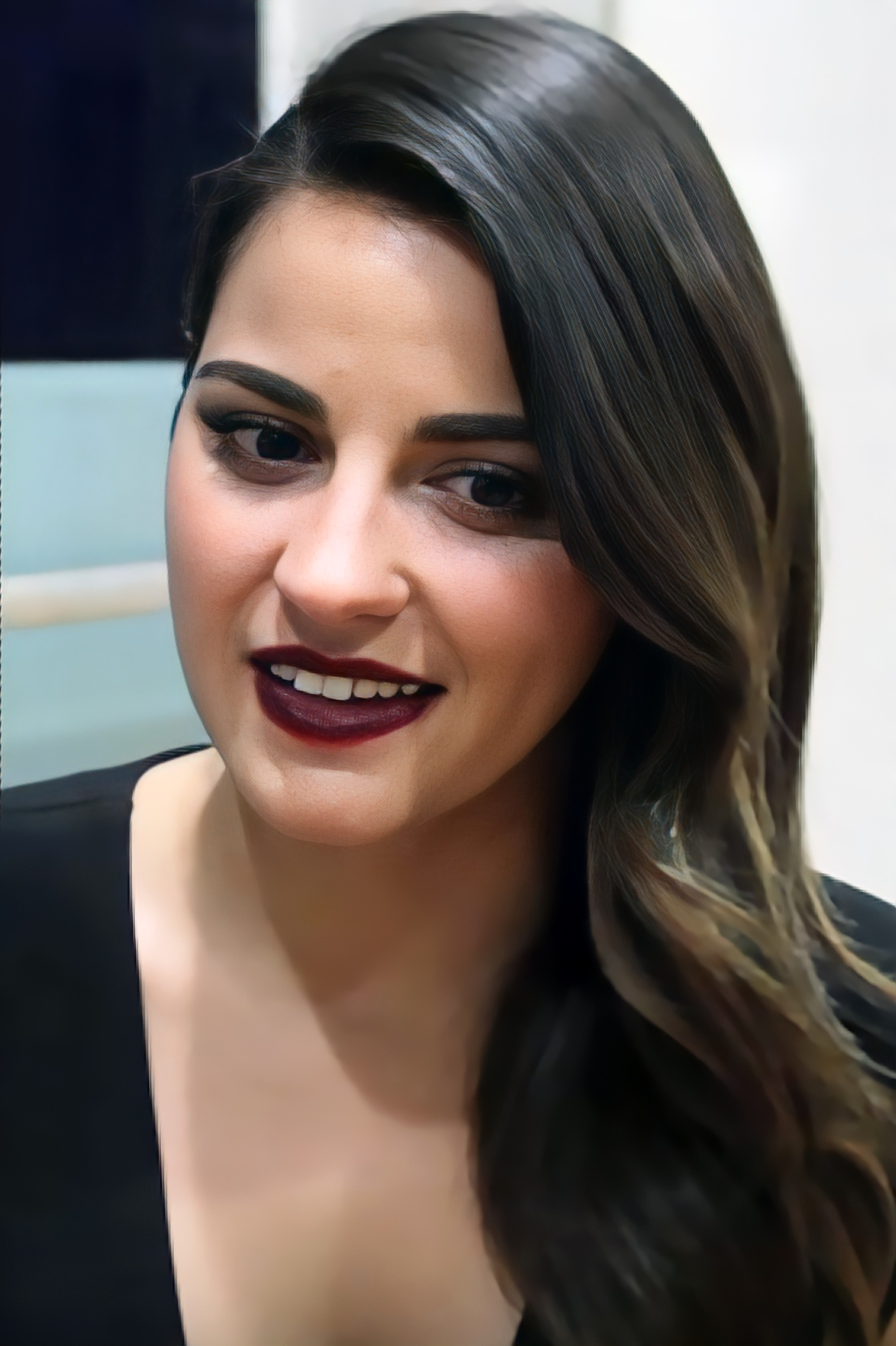
Maite Perroni, awarded with a Special Award as Most Popular Artist in Social Media

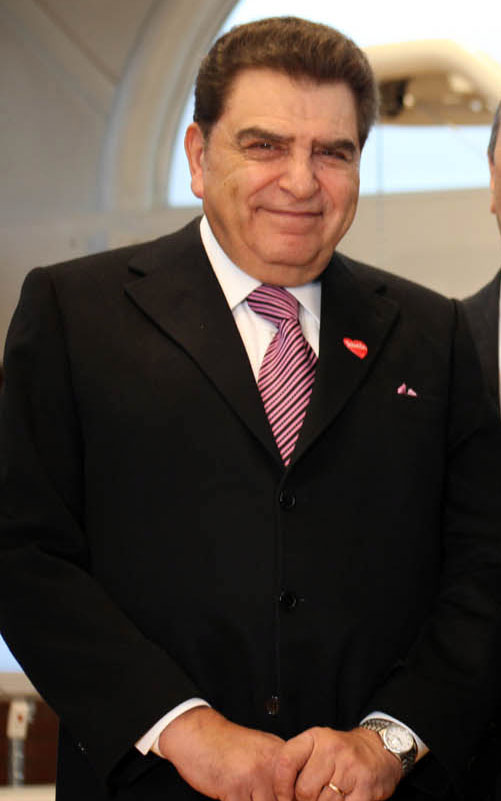
Don Francisco, awarded with a Special Award for 50 years in Television

Best Telenovela	Best Musical Theme
La fuerza del destino; Dos hogares; La que no podía amar; Triunfo del amor; Una familia con suerte	"Día de suerte" — Alejandra Guzmán – Una familia con suerte; "A partir de hoy" — Maite Perroni and Marco DiMauro – Triunfo del amor; "La fuerza del destino" — Sandra Echeverría and Marc Anthony – La fuerza del destino; "Rendirme en tu amor" — Anahí and Carlos Ponce – Dos hogares; "Te dejaré de amar" — Reyli – La que no podía amar
Best Actress	Best Actor
Sandra Echeverría – La fuerza del destino; Ana Brenda Contreras – La que no podía amar; Maite Perroni – Triunfo del amor; Mayrín Villanueva – Una familia con suerte	Jorge Salinas – La que no podía amar; Arath de la Torre – Una familia con suerte; David Zepeda – La fuerza del destino; Sergio Goyri – Dos hogares
Best Antagonist Actress	Best Antagonist Actor
Daniela Romo – Triunfo del amor; Chantal Andere – Rafaela; Laisha Wilkins – La fuerza del destino; Olivia Collins – Dos hogares	Juan Ferrara – La fuerza del destino; Jorge Ortiz de Pinedo – Dos hogares; Lisardo – Esperanza del corazón
Best Leading Actress	Best Leading Actor
Delia Casanova – La fuerza del destino; Ana Bertha Espín – La que no podía amar; Carmen Salinas – Triunfo del amor; Lucía Méndez – Esperanza del corazón; Patricia Reyes Spíndola – Rafaela	César Évora – Triunfo del amor; Enrique Rocha – Una familia con suerte; Fernando Allende – Esperanza del corazón; Rogelio Guerra – Rafaela
Best Co-lead Actress	Best Co-lead Actor
Marisol del Olmo – Esperanza del corazón; Alicia Machado – Una familia con suerte; Ximena Herrera – Ni contigo ni sin ti	José Ron – La que no podía amar; Alejandro Ibarra – Amorcito corazón; Mark Tacher – Triunfo del amor; Pedro Moreno – Una familia con suerte
Best Young Lead Actress	Best Young Lead Actor
Livia Brito – Triunfo del amor; Claudia Álvarez – Dos hogares; Gaby Mellado – Amorcito corazón; Thelma Madrigal – Esperanza del corazón	Osvaldo de León – Una familia con suerte; Alejandro Speitzer – Esperanza del corazón; Brandon Peniche – Ni contigo ni sin ti; Diego Amozurrutia – Amorcito corazón
Best Female Revelation	Best Male Revelation
Alejandra García – Una familia con suerte; Laura Carmine – Ni contigo ni sin ti; Carmen Aub – Esperanza del corazón	Pablo Lyle – Una familia con suerte; Juan Diego Covarrubias – Una familia con suerte; Mané de la Parra – Esperanza del corazón
Best Original Story or Adaptation
María Zarattini and Claudia Velazco – La fuerza del destino; Emilio Larrosa, Ricardo Barona and Saúl Pérez Santana – Dos hogares; Liliana Abud and Ricardo Fiallega – Triunfo del amor; Ximena Suárez, Julián Aguilar and Janely E. Lee – La que no podía amar

=== Others ===
Best Entertainment Program	Best Competitions Program
Hoy; Sabadazo; Se vale	100 mexicanos dijeron; 1, 2, 3 por México; Resbalón
Best Restricted TV Program	Best Special Program
MoJoe; Morir en martes; Pa' la banda Night Show; SuSana adicción	Gran Gala Panamericana Guadalajara 2011; Fiesta mexicana; La boda real inglesa; México suena; Nuestra Belleza México
Best Talent Show	Best Series
La Voz... México; La vida es mejor cantando; Pequeños gigantes	El encanto del águila; Los héroes del norte; Mujeres asesinas 3

=== Special awards ===
- Most Watched Telenovela: Triunfo del amor
- Most Popular Artist in Social Media: Maite Perroni
- TVyNovelas Debut: Fernanda Vizzuet
- 50 years in Television: Don Francisco
- A Lifetime in Telenovelas: Silvia Pinal
- A Lifetime in Television: Xavier López "Chabelo"

=== Performers ===
Name(s)	Performed
Laura León	"Dos hogares"
La Voz... México	Temas musicales de telenovelas
Los héroes del norte	"La miedosa"
Mané de la Parra	"Esperanza del corazón"
Pablo Montero	"Regalito del cielo"
Paulina Rubio	"Me gustas tanto"
Pepe Aguilar	"Ni contigo ni sin ti"
Sandra Echeverría	"La fuerza del destino"
Susana Zabaleta	"Haciendo historia"

=== Absent ===
People who did not the attend ceremony and were nominated in the shortlist in each category:

- Alejandra Guzmán (Juan Osorio received the award in her place)
- Anahí
- Carlos Ponce
- Daniela Romo
- Mark Tacher

== In Memoriam ==
- Carlos Monden
- Enrique Caceres Mendez
- Eugenio Toussaint
- Facundo Cabral
- Gaspar Henaine
- Guillermo Zarur
- Jorge Lavat
- Juan Calderon
- Juan Ramon Saenz
- Julia Marichal
- Lilia Michel
- Lolo Navarro
- Lorenzo de Rodas
- Manuel Esperón
- Manuel López Ochoa
- Miguel Courtier
- Rosángela Balbó
- Pedro Armendáriz Jr.
