= Ni contigo ni sin ti =

- Genre: Telenovela; Romance; Drama comedy
- Created by: Cassiano Gabus Méndez
- Written by: Antonio Abascal; Carlos Daniel González; Rossana Ruiz; Susana Walls
- Screenplay by: Gabriela Ortigoza
- Directed by: José Elías Moreno; Mauricio Rodríguez
- Starring: Eduardo Santamarina; Laura Carmine; Erick Elías; Alessandra Rosaldo; Ricardo Franco
- Theme music composer: Jorge Eduardo Murguía; Mauricio L. Arriuga; Pepe Aguilar
- Opening theme: Ni contigo ni sin ti performed by Pepe Aguilar
- Ending theme: Eres performed by Alessandra Rosaldo
- Country of origin: Mexico
- Original language: Spanish
- No. of episodes: 130

Production
- Executive producer: Mapat L. de Zatarain
- Producer: Marco Vinicio López de Zatarain
- Production locations: Filming; Televisa San Ángel; Mexico City, Mexico; Locations; Puebla, Mexico
- Cinematography: Óscar Morales; Mauricio Manzano; Marco Vinicio López de Zatarain
- Editor: Gabriela Torres
- Camera setup: Multi-camera
- Running time: 41-44 minutes
- Production company: Televisa

Original release
- Network: Canal de las Estrellas
- Release: February 28 – August 26, 2011

Related
- Te Contei? (1978) ¿Te conté? (1990)

Ni contigo... ni sin ti (English title: With You, Without You) is a Spanish-language Mexican telenovela produced by Mapat L. de Zatarain for Televisa. It premiered on February 28, 2011, and ended on August 26, 2011.

Eduardo Santamarina, Laura Carmine, Erick Elías and Alessandra Rosaldo starred as protagonists, while Andrea Torre, Ricardo Franco and Luz María Jerez starred as antagonists. Sabine Moussier, María Marcela, Otto Sirgo, Ximena Herrera and the leading actresses Luz María Aguilar and Beatriz Aguirre starred as stellar performances.

In the United States it premiered on Univision on October 18, 2011, and ended on April 6, 2012.

== Plot ==
Leo (Eduardo Santamarina) became blind because of an accident that occurred when he was 15 years old. His personality does not correspond to television stereotypes of disabled persons. On the contrary, Leo is optimistic and happy. Nicole (Laura Carmine) moves into Leo's building after leaving her home town due to the destruction caused by a hurricane.

Leo works selling encyclopedias and teaching Braille at the local museum while Nicole studies design. They meet and fall in love. Nicole works in an exclusive boutique run by Eleonor (Sabine Moussier). Eleonor has a daughter named Veronica (Lili Gorett). Besides having a complicated mother-daughter relationship, they share a secret. Julia (Alessandra Rosaldo) also lives there and is constantly looking for job. Julia is about to marry Octavio (Otto Sirgo), a wealthy, middle-aged man who gets everything his way. She is marrying him out of gratitude because he got her out of a strip club. She meets Iker (Erick Elías), a good-looking young man. There is a misunderstanding between them and Iker feels rejected.

The story tells about other couples, rich and humble. Rich people have a nice house in a district of uptown. Humble people have jobs that provide basic support.

== Cast ==
=== Main ===
- Eduardo Santamarina as Leonardo "Leo" Cornejo Fernández
- Laura Carmine as Nicole Lorentti Tinoco de Cornejo
- Erick Elías as Iker Rivas Olmedo
- Alessandra Rosaldo as Julia Mistral de Rivas
- Sabine Moussier as Eleonor Cortázar Armenta de Rivas
- María Marcela as Doña Carola "Caro" Tinoco Vda. de Lorentti
- Andrea Torre as Fabiola Escalante de Rivas
- Ricardo Franco as José Carlos Rivas Olmedo
- Luz María Jerez as Irene Olmedo de Rivas
- Ximena Herrera as Isabela Rivas Olmedo Reyes
- Beatriz Aguirre as Doña Miranda de la Reguera de Fernández

=== Also main ===
- César Bono as Don Gelasio Lorentti
- Gaston Tuset as Alejandro Rivas
- Mauricio Mejía as Marco Rábago
- Lili Gorett as Verónica Galindo Cortázar
- Yousi Díaz as Flora Topete
- Jorge Ortín as Don Chuy Turrubiates
- Sharis Cid as Salma Rábago de Chamorro
- Amparo Garrido as Doña Adela "Adelita" Vda. de Chamorro
- Robin Vega as Tobías Marcelino "Tobi" Topete
- Michelle Renaud as Concepción "Cony" Chamorro de Garnica
- Pepe Gamez as Alfonso "Poncho" Chamorro
- Brandon Peniche as Diego Torreslanda
- René Mussi as Eduardo "Lalo" Garnica
- Sachi Tamashiro as Yolanda "Yola" Zorrilla
- Óscar Zamanillo as Bosco Rosado
- Marifer Galindo as Laura
- Maité Valverde as Mary

=== Special participation ===
- Graciela Döring as Doña Felipa
- Iliana de la Garza as Refugio "Cuca"
- Beatriz Moreno as Clara Fernández de la Reguera Vda. de Cornejo
- Luz María Aguilar as Doña Natalia Armenta de Cortázar
- Otto Sirgo as Octavio Torreslanda
- José Elías Moreno as Dr. Esteban Lieja
- Luis Gatica as Lawyer of Fabiola

== Awards and nominations ==
=== TVyNovelas Awards ===
Year	Category	Nominee	Result
2012	Best Female Revelation	Laura Carmine	Won
2012	Best Co-lead Actress	Ximena Herrera	Nominated
2012	Best Young Lead Actor	Brandon Peniche	Nominated

=== La Maravilla Awards ===
Year	Category	Nominee	Result
2012	Best Performance by an Actor	Eduardo Santamarina	Won
2012	Best Performance by an Actress	Sabine Moussier	Won

=== TV Adicto Golden Awards ===
Year	Category	Nominee	Result
2012	Best Character Design	Gabriela Ortigoza, Antonio Abascal and Carlos Daniel González	Won

=== Oye (México) Awards ===
Year	Category	Nominee	Result
2012	Best Theme of Telenovela, Series, Theater or Movie in Spanish	Pepe Aguilar	Nominated
