= La que no podía amar =

Mexican telenovela

- Genre: Telenovela
- Created by: Ximena Suárez
- Written by: Julián Aguilar; Janely E. Lee; Vanesa Varela
- Story by: Delia Fiallo
- Directed by: Salvador Garcini; Alejandro Gamboa
- Creative director: Sandra Cortés
- Starring: Jorge Salinas; José Ron; Susana González; Ana Brenda Contreras
- Theme music composer: Reyli Barba
- Opening theme: "Te dejaré de amar" performed by Reyli
- Country of origin: Mexico
- Original language: Spanish
- No. of episodes: 162

Production
- Executive producer: José Alberto Castro
- Producers: Ernesto Hernández; Fausto Sáinz
- Cinematography: Alejandro Frutos; Narciso Colunga
- Editors: Juan Ordóñez; Héctor Flores; Arturo Rodríguez
- Running time: Multi-camera
- Production company: Televisa

Original release
- Network: Canal de las Estrellas
- Release: August 1, 2011 – March 18, 2012

Related
- Monte Calvario (1986); Te sigo amando (1996); Amanecer (2025)

La que no podía amar (The One Who Couldn't Love) is a Mexican telenovela produced by José Alberto Castro for Televisa that aired on Canal de las Estrellas from August 1, 2011 to March 18, 2012.

The script is written by Ximna Suárez, based on an original story by Delia Fiallo. The series stars Jorge Salinas, José Ron, Susana González and Ana Brenda Contreras.

In the United States it aired on Univision from January 2, 2012 to August 10, 2012.

La que no podía amar won 2 awards at the 2012 TVyNovelas Awards in the categories of Best Actor and Best Co-lead Actor.

== Plot ==
The story begins in Tuxtla Gutiérrez, Chiapas, Mexico, where Ana Paula Carmona (Ana Brenda Contreras) lives. As a child, she had to care for her ailing mother. After her mother's death, Ana Paula decided to study nursing so she could always help others.

At the beginning, Ana Paula is about to graduate and meets Bruno (Julián Gil), the lawyer of the fearsome Rogelio Montero (Jorge Salinas). Bruno is looking for a nurse to attend to his boss; the salary is good and Ana Paula accepts the job to financially support her aunt, Rosaura (Ana Bertha Espín), who has looked after her and her brother, Miguel (Osvaldo Benavides), since they were children. Rosaura bitterly complains about having missed opportunities in love in order to raise them and expects them to be the ones to assist her, for which she pretends to be ill. Miguel is the boyfriend of Dany (Íngrid Martz), a bubbly and enthusiastic young woman who tries to change his insecure personality. She is also Ana Paula's best friend; the two studied nursing together.

What Ana Paula doesn't imagine is that she will have to work in very difficult conditions at the "Del Fuerte" ranch, a remote and isolated place. Rogelio's character is very difficult, having not recovered from the consequences of an accident that occurred when he was about to marry Vanesa (Mar Contreras), a frivolous and selfish woman who, upon learning he was disabled, broke up with him. In addition to Rogelio, at the "Del Fuerte” ranch lives his sister, Cinthia (Susana González). She feels trapped because he hasn't given her the inheritance she is entitled to, forcing her to stay by his side to see after him. To avoid boredom, Cinthia begins an affair behind his back with Efraín (Fabián Robles), the ranch's foreman, who truly cares for her.

Ana Paula meets Gustavo Durán (José Ron), a noble and hard-working engineer. They fall in love, but their happiness is cut short when Rogelio also falls for her, forming a love triangle with terrible consequences. When Miguel causes a serious accident and is about to lose his hand and go to prison for life, Rogelio saves him in exchange for Ana Paula marrying him. She sacrifices herself for her brother but has no idea of the ordeal that awaits her at Rogelio's side when he discovers she loves someone else.

== Cast ==
=== Main ===
- Jorge Salinas as Rogelio Montero Báez
- José Ron as Gustavo Durán
- Susana González as Cinthia Montero Báez
- Ana Brenda Contreras as Ana Paula Carmona Flores

=== Recurring and guest stars ===
- Ana Martín as María Gómez
- Ana Bertha Espín as Rosaura Flores Nava
- Íngrid Martz as Daniela Gutiérrez
- Julián Gil as Bruno Rey
- Fabián Robles as Efraín Ríos
- Paty Díaz as Macaria
- Osvaldo Benavides as Miguel Carmona Flores
- Mar Contreras as Vanesa Galván
- Alejandro Ávila as Ernesto
- Marco Méndez as Esteban
- Michelle Ramaglia as Consuelo Herrera
- Anaís as Mercedes Durán
- Germán Gutiérrez as Ulises Hernández
- Adanely Núñez as Carmen
- Ignacio López Tarso as Fermín Peña
- Jorge Aravena as Eng. David Romo
- Elizabeth Dupeyrón as Elsa de Galván
- Humberto Elizondo as Federico Galván
- Javier Ruán as Máximo
- Polly as Elena
- Elena Torres as Rocío
- Mario del Río as Juan
- Ricardo Mendoza "El Coyote" as Engineer
- Uriel del Toro as Hugo Dueñas
- Tania Lizardo as Maripaz Hernández
- Martín Brek as Rutilio

== Reception ==
In the United States, the series premiered with an average of 4.1 million viewers. The finale averaged 5.8 million viewers.

=== Mexico ratings ===
Timeslot (CT)	# Ep.	Premiere		Finale		TV Season
Timeslot (CT)	# Ep.	Date	Premiere share (in points)	Date	Finale share (in points)	TV Season
Monday-Friday; 7:15 pm	166	August 1, 2011	17.2	March 18, 2012	24.4	2011-12

== Awards and nominations ==
Year	Award	Category	Nominee(s)	Result
2011	TV Adicto Golden Awards			
2011	TV Adicto Golden Awards	Best Actress in a Supporting Role	Susana González	Won
2011	TV Adicto Golden Awards	Best Male Villain	Jorge Salinas	Won
2012	TVyNovelas Awards			
2012	TVyNovelas Awards	Best Telenovela	José Alberto Castro	Nominated
2012	TVyNovelas Awards	Best Actress	Ana Brenda Contreras	Nominated
2012	TVyNovelas Awards	Best Actor	Jorge Salinas	Won
2012	TVyNovelas Awards	Best Leading Actress	Ana Bertha Espin	Nominated
2012	TVyNovelas Awards	Best Co-lead Actor	José Ron	Won
2012	TVyNovelas Awards	Best Musical Theme	"Te dejaré de amar" by Reyli	Nominated
2012	TVyNovelas Awards	Best Original Story or Adaptation	Ximena Suárez; Julián Aguilar; Janely E. Lee	Nominated
2012	Bravo Awards			
2012	Bravo Awards	Best Actress	Ana Brenda Contreras	Won
2012	People en Español Awards			
2012	People en Español Awards	Best Telenovela	La que no podía amar	Won
2012	People en Español Awards	Best Actress	Ana Brenda Contreras	Nominated
2012	People en Español Awards	Best Actor	Jorge Salinas	Nominated
2012	People en Español Awards	Best Supporting Actress	Susana González	Won
2012	People en Español Awards	Best Supporting Actor	José Ron	Nominated
2012	People en Español Awards	Best Female Villain	Ana Bertha Espín	Nominated
2012	People en Español Awards	Best Male Villain	Julián Gil	Nominated
2012	People en Español Awards	Best Couple	Ana Brenda Contreras; Jorge Salinas	Won
2012	Juventud Awards	Girl of my Dreams	Ana Brenda Contreras	Won
2012	Juventud Awards	What a Hottie!	Jorge Salinas	Nominated
2012	Juventud Awards	What a Hottie!	José Ron	Nominated
