= Siete años de matrimonio =

- Directed by: Joel Núñez
- Written by: Natalia Armienta
- Starring: Ximena Herrera; Víctor González; Cristián de la Fuente
- Cinematography: Juan Hernández
- Music by: Tomás Barreiro; Pablo Chemor
- Release date: 25 January 2013 (Mexico)
- Running time: 100 min
- Country: Mexico
- Language: Spanish

Siete años de matrimonio also known as 7 años de matrimonio, is a Mexican film written by Natalia Armienta Oikawa and directed by Joel Núñez. Starring by Ximena Herrera and Víctor González. It was premiered on 25 January 2013.

== Plot ==
A romantic comedy that has the ups and downs of a couple to hold marriage when honeymoon with his insatiable rabbit is a thing of the past. Most only last seven years! According to who? It is a fetish or actually is the circle of life? Every seven years all is renewed. The cells of your body change, biologically we are new people; It changes the lyrics, taste and... the genetic interest is lost. Alberto deeply loves Ana and believes that relationships are based on respect but Pepe, his best friend, writes that they are based on diamonds and viagra.

== Cast ==
- Ximena Herrera as Ana
- Víctor González as Alberto
- Cristián de la Fuente as Bernardo
- Roberto Palazuelos as Pepe
- Alex Sirvent as Franco
- Yolanda Andrade as Luna
- Jacqueline Andere as Adriana
- María Sorté as Edna
- Alejandra Procuna as Tessie
- Jorge Campos as Jorge
- Arturo García Tenorio as Sergio
- Daniela Savala as Abogada
- Daniel Villar as Emmanuel
- Katherine Porto as Laura
