= La desalmada =

Mexican telenovela

- Genre: Telenovela
- Based on: La dama de Troya by: Alejandro Torres; Guido Jácome; Felipe Forero
- Developed by: Ximena Suárez
- Written by: Julián Aguilar; Janely Lee; Isabel de Sara; Fabiola López Neri
- Directed by: Salvador Garcini; Fez Noriega
- Starring: Livia Brito; José Ron; Eduardo Santamarina; Marjorie de Sousa; Marlene Favela
- Theme music composer: Espinoza Paz
- Opening theme: "Mi venganza" by Espinoza Paz
- Country of origin: Mexico
- Original language: Spanish
- No. of seasons: 1
- No. of episodes: 85 (Note: In Mexico, the telenovela was abridged to 85 broadcast episodes, while in other countries it remained with the 90 episodes produced.)

Production
- Executive producer: José Alberto Castro
- Producers: Ernesto Hernández; Fausto Sáinz
- Camera setup: Multi-camera
- Production company: Televisa

Original release
- Network: Las Estrellas
- Release: 5 July – 29 October 2021

La desalmada (English title: Heartless) is a Mexican telenovela produced by José Alberto Castro for Televisa. It is based on the 2008 Colombian telenovela La dama de Troya created by Felipe Forero, Alejandro Torres and Guido Jácome. Livia Brito stars as the titular character, alongside José Ron, Eduardo Santamarina, Marjorie de Sousa, and Marlene Favela. It aired on Las Estrellas from 5 July to 29 October 2021.

== Plot ==
Fernanda Linares is a woman who only seeks to avenge her husband, who was murdered on their wedding night, where in addition to this unfortunate event, she was raped. Fernanda's memory is not clear, which leads her to doubt and making mistakes in judgement. When she meets Rafael Toscano, she falls deeply in love with him, but confuses him with the man who harmed her. Over time, as her memory clears up, Fernanda realizes her error and that it was not Rafael, but his father, Octavio Toscano, who ruined her life.

== Cast ==
=== Main ===
- Livia Brito as Fernanda Linares
- José Ron as Rafael Toscano
- Eduardo Santamarina as Octavio Toscano
- Marjorie de Sousa as Julia Torreblanca de Gallardo
- Marlene Favela as Leticia Lagos de Toscano
- Azela Robinson as Martina Fernández de Estudillo
- Sergio Basáñez as Germán Gallardo
- Alberto Estrella as Carmelo Murillo
- Kimberly Dos Ramos as Isabela Gallardo
- Gonzalo García Vivanco as Rigoberto Murillo
- Francisco Gattorno as Antonio Estudillo
- Verónica Jaspeado as Juana Durán
- Laura Carmine as Ángela Hinojosa
- Alejandra García as Rosalina Santos
- Julio Vallado as David Estudillo
- Gabriela Zamora as Flor / Dora Franco
- Mauricio Abularach as José Vargas
- Gaby Mellado as Clara Ochoa
- Gonzalo Vega Jr. as Piero Vázquez
- Cecilia Galliano as Miriam Soler
- Macarena Miguel as Mary Pérez
- Carlos Gatica as Gabriel Rojas
- Claudia Arce as Candela Benítez
- Fiona Muñoz as Sandra Fuentes
- Ana Martín as Pachita Pérez
- Raúl Araiza as Luis Vázquez
- Daniel Elbittar as César Franco

=== Recurring and guest stars ===
- Yahir as Santiago Ramírez
- Espinoza Paz as himself
- Fernando Robles as Calixto Linares
- Rosita Bouchot as Chona
- José Montini as Moreno
- Alfonso Iturralde as Alberto Tsubaki
- Jackie Sauza as Brenda
- Mónica Ayos as Viviana
- Homero Ferruzca as Rosendo Futanasio
- Pedro Moreno as Caimán

== Production ==
La desalmada was announced on 15 October 2020 at Televisa's Visión21 upfront. The main cast was revealed on 11 March 2021. Filming of the telenovela took place from 17 March to 21 August 2021. On 17 May 2022, TelevisaUnivision confirmed that the series had been renewed for a second season. By August 2023, however, production on the second season had been put on hold due to cast members moving on to other projects.

== Episodes ==
No.	Title	Original release date	Mexico viewers (millions)
1	"Es de mala suerte"	5 July 2021 (Note: Premiered early online through Las Estrellas website on 2 July 2021.)	3.0
Fernanda and Santiago will soon marry, a moment that fills them with happiness. Julia tells Germán that it is necessary to buy an apartment for Isabela since she is worried that she will share a room with unknown people. Fernanda decides to wear her mother's wedding dress on her wedding day after Santiago accidentally sees her in her original dress. Isabela in the company of her father arrives in the city and are reunited with Rafael and David. Santiago surprises Fernanda on her wedding day. Octavio, with the help of Carmelo, arrive at Santiago's house in order to force him to sign and thus be able to sell his lands; however things get out of control and Octavio shoots Santiago, killing him.
2	"Acaba con ella"	6 July 2021	3.6
After Santiago's death, Fernanda is raped, but while trying to flee, Carmelo shoots her and she loses consciousness and falls into the river. Isabela arrives in town and meets with Rafael. Juana and Luis arrive at the river and discover that Fernanda is injured so they take her home to save her life. Fernanda confesses to Juana what some hooded men did to her. Luis informs Juana that Santiago died and they staged his death as a car accident. Antonio assures Octavio that as long as he is mayor, he will always be well protected, so Octavio leaves him a portfolio full of money as a thank you. Carmelo informs Octavio that the deal to purchase Santiago’s land has already been closed. Octavio confesses that Julia chose Germán over him when she found out that Germán had an inheritance from his parents, so now he seeks to lead them to ruin.
3	"Estoy muerta en vida"	7 July 2021	3.4
Fernanda assures Juanita that her soul and her life left with Santiago's. Octavio begins his revenge against Germán. Julia assures Isabela that Rafael is the ideal man for her. Luis and Juanita advise Fernanda that it is best for her to go home to avoid being caught by Octavio’s men. Julia catches Isabela talking to Rigoberto and asks him to learn to mind his place. Fernanda confesses to her father, Calixto, that Santiago was killed. Fernanda vows revenge on the man who took Santiago's life, so she is no longer afraid of anyone. Calixto tells Fernanda that after what happened she is not the same, when he looks into her eyes, it is like looking at a dead person. Calixto dies in the arms of his daughter.
4	"Nada me va a detener"	8 July 2021	3.8
Three years go by and Juana and Luis, upon learning of Fernanda's intentions to take revenge, try to convince her to forget what happened and ask her to start a new life, but she refuses. Isabela and Rafael get engaged, but he asks her to live on the farm for a while before going to Italy. Germán asks Octavio for help, but he refuses. Fernanda arrives at Octavio's packing house ready to start her revenge and thus seek justice for Santiago, so she leaves a message for him. Octavio reads the message that Fernanda left him and knows that the attack was personal. Rigoberto finds out that Isabela is going to marry Rafael. Rafael mistakes Fernanda for a thief so when he sees that she was close to him, he decides to catch her, without thinking that it is a woman. Rigoberto warns Isabela that he does not intend to keep their relationship a secret.
5	"¡Está viva!"	9 July 2021	3.6
Rafael rejects the gift that his father gave him and assures him that he has other plans, upon hearing the news, Octavio gets upset. Fernanda asks Luis for accommodation. Rafael confesses to David that he was impressed with Fernanda's beauty. Julia complains to Germán for not having talked about the wedding between Isabela and Rafael with Octavio. After winning the horse race, Fernanda is discovered by Octavio, but Carmelo assures him that it cannot be her, since he verified that she was dead the night she was shot. Germán and his family are evicted from their ranch. Rafael, seeing that Fernanda won the race, seeks to approach her to offer an apology for having mistaken her for a thief, but she avoids him. Octavio asks Carmelo to investigate Fernanda's identity. Julia is ashamed when she learns that they have stayed on the street.
6	"Te vas a encontrar con el diablo"	12 July 2021	3.4
Rafael, seeing that Fernanda won the horse race again, challenges her to a race between the two of them, assuring her that if he loses, he pays 200 thousand pesos, but if he wins, he wants a kiss from her. Octavio identifies that the woman who vandalized the packing plant is the same one who was harmed three years ago. Julia and her family come to live on Octavio's farm. Octavio gives the order to arrest Fernanda and asks that she be taken to the packing house, so she is locked in the freezer where the cattle is kept. Isabela confesses to Rafael that she is afraid that her father will not accept her wedding. Fernanda does not believe that Santiago has sold his lands, since there was no secret between the two of them. Octavio begins to learn more about Fernanda and discovers that she is Santiago's widow.
7	"Pagar la apuesta"	13 July 2021	3.8
Rafael takes advantage of the fact that his father is at the farm to inform him that he is going to marry Isabela. Octavio, upon hearing the news, gets upset and has a strong fight with his son. Julia tries to reassure Octavio with a kiss. Fernanda manages to meet with Juana and Luis. After finding her in bed with Rigoberto, Isabela confesses to Ángela that he is very special to her, but she cannot be with Beto, as she affectionately calls him, because he is poor. Octavio does not resist Julia's charms and they indulge in passion. Fernanda and Rafael face off in the horse race, but Centella presents a problem that causes Fernanda to lose the competition, Rafael demands that Fernanda pay the bet and when he is about to kiss her on the cheek, he turns around and steals a kiss on the mouth.
8	"A mí no me tiembla la mano"	14 July 2021	3.6
Fernanda slaps Rafael hard after he stole a kiss from her. Rafael confesses to David that he regrets his attitude. Fernanda discovers that Centella was given a star to hurt her during the competition and thus she lost the race. Fernanda, upon discovering that Rafael hurt Centella so that he could win, decides to face him and assures him that she likes to win the hard way, so she asks for a rematch. Julia asks Germán for a divorce. Carmelo hits Juana on the head. Fernanda realizes that Octavio is chasing her so she does not hesitate to confront him, but he pretends to be a good man to the point of making her a business proposal. Fernanda arrives at the packing house and comes out in defense of her friends. Octavio sees a photo of Fernanda and confesses his desire for her.
9	"Tomar lo que es mío"	15 July 2021	3.6
Isabela manages to get Rafael to advance the wedding so they make it official. Rigoberto, upon seeing that his father was hit on the back, suspects that it was Octavio, but Carmelo denies it. Fernanda makes a strong warning at the packinghouse. Fernanda, upon winning the race, demands that Rafael give her his horse, but he refuses and in exchange for Marajá, offers him the amount of 200 thousand pesos. Rafael is willing to teach Fernanda a lesson. When Adolfo sees the amount of money he lost by betting on Rafael, he confronts him. Fernanda gets her way and gets Rafael's horse. Rafael takes responsibility for the missing horse. Miriam returns to Luis's house.
10	"Voy a ser tu patrona"	16 July 2021	3.8
Candela tells Rosalina that everything in the house is in Miriam's name, so Luis would not hesitate for a moment to rush them to be okay with his ex-wife. For this reason, Candela proposes to Rosalina that they remove Miriam from the house and thus the lawsuit will only continue between the two of them. Rafael arrives to demand that Fernanda return his horse but she receives him with a shotgun in hand and tells him that she won it right. After a while of arguing, Rafael apologizes to her and tells her that he just wanted to beat her hard but she asks him about the kiss he stole from her. Isabela and Rigoberto are in the stable kissing when they leave and see Rafael and although he does not suspect, he asks her what she is doing there if she does not like the smell of the stable but Isabela cleverly replies that she went riding with Ángela. Carmelo tells Octavio that Adolfo Guzmán beat Rafael up because he bet a lot of money in his favor in the races and lost. Octavio does not stay with his hands crossed and faces Guzmán to the death.
11	"Desnuda en el rio"	19 July 2021	3.5
Fernanda is upset with Rafael to discover that he saw her naked while swimming in the river. Octavio ends up with Guzmán's workers. Julia asks Leticia to talk to Rigoberto so that he gets away from Isabela, but she responds in the best way. Juana informs Rafael that he is fired since Fernanda is very heartfelt for him. Fernanda learns that Leticia Lagos is the majority partner of the packing company. Octavio discovers that Fernanda is investigating the packing house so he is willing to kill her. Guzmán is determined to take revenge on Octavio, so he takes advantage of the fact that he is in the river to shoot him. Fernanda, seeing that there is a wounded man, runs to his aid.
12	"Me salvaste la vida"	20 July 2021	3.9
Fernanda arrives at the hospital where Octavio is and asks him to tell her the reason why he was chasing her, but he manages to divert the subject, arguing that he feels very grateful for having saved his life. In his eagerness to obtain Fernanda's forgiveness, Rafael serenades her, but when she sees the whole show that is being done, she gets upset, but Rafael clings to staying at the ranch until he hears that he was forgiven and that he can return to comply with the agreement. Juana becomes suspicious of Fernanda's feelings for Rafael. Octavio assures Carmelo that he is willing to risk himself for Fernanda, since he deserves to have a woman like her. Julia finds Isabela in bed with Rigoberto.
13	"No me dejes morir"	21 July 2021	3.8
Fernanda is in a very serious condition after being bitten by a snake, so Rafael, seeing her, runs to her aid. Julia threatens to kill Rigoberto and Carmelo suspects that his son interfered with Isabela. Rafael manages to stabilize Fernanda and while watching his dream he confesses that he had never met such a wonderful woman before. Isabela assures Ángela that if her mother had hurt Rigoberto, she would die. Isabela plans to have a romantic moment with Rafael; However, when she communicates with him, she discovers that he is with another woman. Carmelo takes Don Octavio to the cabin where he wants to be with Fernanda. Rafael surprises Fernanda.
14	"¿Podemos ser amigos?"	22 July 2021	3.5
Juana realizes that with the arrival of Rafael, Fernanda's life was re-illuminated. Julia is determined to divorce Germán and warns him that she will ask for a large fortune. Octavio is willing to surprise Fernanda. Isabela and Rafael have an uncomfortable moment. Fernanda, seeing Rafael's good intentions, decides to start treating him as a friend. Octavio arrives at the ranch ready to deliver the cattle to Fernanda, but Juana assures him that her friend and partner will not accept the detail, Julia tries to manipulate Isabela with her advice.
15	"No quiero un hombre en mi vida"	23 July 2021	3.7
Fernanda, knowing that Rafael did not let Trujillo buy the cattle, decides to confront him, but is tremendously surprised when Gabriel informs her that Rafael has already sold all the cattle, Fernanda is filled with emotion and Rafael does not hesitate to hug her. Julia feels used by Octavio after he assured her that he is not exclusive to any woman. Rigoberto, upon learning that Isabela is getting ready for her wedding rehearsal, surprises her by assuring her that he will take her to her in-laws' house, but in reality he has another plan. David realizes that his friend Rafael likes Fernanda. Rafael does not hesitate to go to Luis's party and seeing Fernanda with a different style assures her that she looks beautiful. Juana confirms that between Rafael and Fernanda something more than an employment relationship begins to exist. Rafael decides to leave Luis's party, after Fernanda rejected his friendship. Rigoberto doesn't want to lose Isabela so he proposes to her.
16	"Me muero por besarte"	26 July 2021	3.9
Rafael wants to be close to Fernanda so he takes advantage of the moment and invites her to dance, but when she assures him that she doesn't know how to, he offers to teach her. Isabela confesses to Rigoberto that she loves him. Julia confronts Ángela. Julia, knowing that Isabela was already in the town's parish, decides to go look for her to ask for an explanation, but when she sees that her daughter comes out in defense of Rigoberto, she prefers not to question her and manipulates her by assuring her that it would be humiliating if her wedding with Rafael is canceled. Juana asks Fernanda to accept that she likes Rafael and asks her to be happy again. Rafael, knowing that Isabela did not come to the wedding rehearsal either, decides to come to her defense and blame himself for what happened, so he apologizes to his parents and the Bishop. Fernanda assures Rafael that she is afraid of everything she is feeling and confesses that for some time she has not felt so happy, but in reality she is telling this to Santiago in a dream. Octavio discovers that his son Rafael is interested in someone else.
17	"No imagino mi vida sin ti"	27 July 2021	3.7
Fernanda is determined to return the cattle to Octavio so she arrives at the 'Primor'; however during her visit to the hacienda she discovers that Rafael is Octavio's son. Isabela realizes that her wedding dress was exchanged for a fishing tackle, while Rosalina receives the dress and believes that Luis sent it to her. Leticia discovers that Octavio gave some steers to a woman, so she confronts him and asks him to tell her the truth. Rafael learns that Fernanda saved his father's life. Miriam asks to speak to Rosalina. Octavio discovers that Rafael and he are interested in Fernanda, so he will not allow it. Fernanda feels betrayed by Rafael when he hides from her that he is Octavio's son. Rafael confesses to Fernanda that he has fallen in love with her and asks her not to hide her feelings, so they do not hesitate to kiss.
18	"Tengo miedo de volver a amar"	28 July 2021	3.8
Fernanda assures Rafael that she cannot maintain a relationship with him and asks him not to touch her again. Isabela thinks Rafael is hiding something from her, so she doesn't want to leave him. Fernanda confesses to Juana that she is betraying Santiago. Leticia informs Julia that Octavio is having an affair with a woman who had the nerve to enter her house. Octavio is delighted with the decoration of his cabin and says he is going to use it for the first time with Julia. Octavio tries to convince Rafael not to get married so they can continue to be the perfect business couple. Leticia arrives at 'Nuevo amanecer' in search of the woman who is circling Octavio. David assures Rafael that the best thing to do is to forget Fernanda and for him to continue with his life; however, Fernanda arrives at the moment when he is talking about his wedding.
19	"Está muerto para mí"	29 July 2021	3.7
Octavio complains to Leticia for having gone to the Nuevo amanecer ranch and threatens her with divorce if she continues with her jealousy. Fernanda confesses before Santiago's grave that she is afraid of becoming heartless for all the damage that man did to her, but recognizes that she feels something special for Rafael. Fernanda discovers that Rafael is going to marry Isabela. Rafael assures David that he wants to talk to Fernanda to clear things up and confess that he is very much in love. Julia does not hesitate to humiliate Germán. Fernanda assures Juana that she deserves this betrayal for believing in Rafael, he arrives at the ranch Nuevo amanecer to talk to Fernanda, but she confronts him for hiding his marriage to Isabela and before the anger, she does not hesitate to slap him. Fernanda calls Rafael cynical and takes out a shotgun to remove him out of her house.
20	"El gran día llegó"	30 July 2021	3.8
Octavio takes advantage of the fact that the family is gathered to give Rafael his bull necklace, and assures him that when the eldest son of a Toscano marries, he inherits this important symbol. Fernanda assures Juana that it is best to never feel anything for anyone so as not to run any risk. Rafael meets Fernanda minutes before his wedding and runs after her. Julia learns that Leticia has already reconciled with Octavio. Minutes before his wedding with Isabela, Rafael assures David that he cannot forget Fernanda so he is willing to go looking for her. After Rafael's betrayal, Fernanda is determined to take revenge on the Toscano family so now more than ever she is convinced that she is heartless. Rafael refuses to marry Isabela, causing the astonishment of all the guests.
21	"Nos engañó a las dos"	2 August 2021	3.7
Rafael confesses to Fernanda that he loves her and that was the reason why he did not marry Isabela. Julia complains to Octavio about the humiliation that Rafael put her daughter through, but he assures her that what hurts her most is that she does not have the economic support of the Toscano family. Fernanda complains to Rafael for having played with her, but he assures her that he loves her and he never imagined loving someone as much as he feels for her. Germán learns that Isabela cheated on Rafael with Rigoberto. Rafael apologizes for what happened with Isabela and confesses that the reason he did not agree to marry her was because he fell in love with another woman. Rafael confesses to Octavio that he fell in love with Fernanda Linares, Octavio forbids him to have a relationship with a ranchera. Octavio is ready to declare war on Fernanda.
22	"Contigo hasta la Luna"	3 August 2021	3.9
Isabela assures Rafael that she is willing to forgive him and Fernanda is still reluctant to give Rafael a chance. Octavio starts the war against the woman his son is in love with and Isabela returns to Rigoberto's shelter. Isabela and Leticia arrive at the ranch 'Nuevo amanecer' in search of Fernanda to confront her; however, they do not find her. Rafael makes a proposal to the woman who stole his heart and she does not hesitate to accept, but she will not allow him to play with her feelings again. Fernanda assures Rafael that if his way of making peace is to be an exhibitionist, she prefers to leave things as they are. Fernanda agrees to give Rafael a chance, he doesn't hesitate to steal a kiss and she reciprocates. Fernanda and Rafael spend the night together. Leticia informs Isabela that Rafael did not come to sleep at the hacienda.
23	"Rafael Toscano es el hombre que más odio en la vida"	4 August 2021	4.0
Rafael gives Fernanda an incredible time. Rigoberto assures Isabela that he enjoys watching her swallow her pride so as not to lose Rafael. Julia intrigues about the women who are around Octavio and Rafael, which makes Leticia doubt. David confesses to Clara that he likes her and kisses her. Leticia sees how upset Octavio gets when he finds out that Rafael spent the night with Fernanda and confronts him, who, feeling attacked, assures her that he is getting fed up with her. Julia asks Isabela to focus on keeping the Toscans away from Fernanda and Juana. Fernanda decides to spend the night with Rafael and does not hesitate to give herself to him. After the romantic moment, Fernanda discovers that Rafael is wearing the bull charm. Fernanda arrives at 'Nuevo amanecer' and confesses to Juana that Octavio's son is the man who raped her and took Santiago's life.
24	"Maté a Rafael Toscano"	5 August 2021	3.9
Juana doubts that Rafael is the man who raped Fernanda and killed Santiago. Isabela assures Rigoberto that Rafael will pay for everything he did to her, so she is ready to take revenge on him. Rafael arrives at 'Nuevo amanecer', but Gabriel forbids him to enter, assuring him that he will kill him first before he hurts Fernanda again, so they come to blows. Julia asks Isabela to continue humiliating herself in front of Rafael. Germán tries to win back the trust of the town's ranchers. Rafael comes to Fernanda's defense and confronts his father by assuring him that he was also a social climber with his mother so that he would be the owner of great wealth, for which Octavio slaps him. Fernanda takes advantage of Rafael being alone in the river to shoot him in the back. Luis tries to make Fernanda see reason and not regret it for the rest of her life.
25	"No dejes que el mal te gane"	6 August 2021	3.8
Fernanda fights with Luis when she assures him that he has no proof that Rafael is innocent, so he asks for time. Fernanda learns that she was threatened and demands that Mateo tell her everything that happened the day of the ambush. Fernanda arrives at Santiago's grave and asks his forgiveness for not having killed the man who destroyed her life. Leticia learns that Rafael may never walk again. Sandra and Clara fight in front of David and he asks for an explanation. Fernanda confesses to Juana that she hopes that Luis will tell her that Rafael is innocent of Santiago's crime and that he did not rape her. Octavio, seeing that his son is debating between life and death, swears that he never wanted to fight with him and even less for a woman, for which he asks for forgiveness.
26	"Maté al hombre que amo"	9 August 2021	3.8
Isabela manages to see Rafael and assures him that she should not have neglected him since none of this would have happened and wishes him a speedy recovery. Fernanda continues with the idea that Rafael is the culprit since she has the evidence in her hands. David informs Fernanda that Rafael has already reacted after hearing his name and shares with her that he does not know if he will walk again, since the bullet hit him very close to his spine, so he begs her to visit him in the hospital. Germán asks Rigoberto to stay away from Isabela, since she does not love him. Fernanda, seeing that Rafael's life is in danger, shares with Miriam and Luis that the best thing to do is to take responsibility for what he did. Luis shows Fernanda a photo proving that Rafael was not there the night of the accident, since he was with his friends. Now that Fernanda recognizes that Rafael is not the culprit, she asks for a miracle to save him.
27	"Nunca vamos a poder estar juntos"	10 August 2021	3.9
Fernanda visits Rafael in the hospital to find out the truth. Isabela assures Rafael that she is willing to take care of him now that he starts his treatment, so he begins to suspect that something is wrong, Isabela tries to kiss him goodbye, but is rejected. Fernanda, wanting to know the truth, discovers that the bull pendant is not Rafael's but Octavio's, who gave it to him on his wedding day. Fernanda knows that she cannot continue her relationship with Rafael, so she says goodbye to him with a tender kiss. When Isabela meets Fernanda she does not hesitate to confront her and calls her a social climber for having taken Rafael's love away from her, Fernanda responds back with a slap so they start hitting each other. Rafael learns that he will not be able to walk. Antonio arrives at 'Nuevo amanecer' to interrogate Fernanda.
28	"Va a sufrir lo mismo que yo"	11 August 2021	3.8
Rigoberto assures Isabela that he is determined to do his best to give her what she deserves, and she tells him that even if he works all his life, he will not be able to live up to her standards. Rigoberto learns that his friend Rafael will not be able to walk. Octavio assures Fernanda that he is close to finding the man who hurt her son Rafael, so he takes advantage of his meeting with her to make her a proposal. Isabela asks Ángela to help her get Rigoberto out of her life to clarify her feelings. Rafael feels desperate knowing that he may not be able to walk again, so he asks the doctor to tell him the whole truth. Fernanda arrives at Octavio's hacienda to confirm that she wants to work with him, but she is already preparing her revenge. Isabela wants to accompany Rafael now that he wants to return to the city. Julia finds Germán with Ángela.
29	"Rafael podrá volver a caminar"	12 August 2021	3.8
Leticia, upon learning that Fernanda accepted Octavio's proposal, assures him that it is not a good idea because it would cause Rafael a lot of pain, so she rejects the job. Julia assures Isabela to take advantage of Rafael's condition to win him back. Germán assures Fernanda that he does not agree that Isabela should marry Rafael, and tries to convince her to sell the cattle to the packing plant, but she refuses because there is no fair payment. Fernanda learns that Rafael will be able to walk again. Isabela, knowing that they will be able to return to the hacienda, does not hesitate to kiss Rafael, but he only thinks of Fernanda. In order to get rid of Octavio, Fernanda enters the hacienda determined to take revenge on the man who hurt her. Rafael discovers that Fernanda is in 'El Primor' and questions her.
30	"Octavio Toscano está muerto como lo merece"	13 August 2021	3.7
Fernanda visits Rafael secretly, which puzzles him, because he asks her if it wasn't enough that she canceled their wedding, but she tells him that she just wanted to know how he was since it is too late for them. After talking to Rafael, Fernanda enters Octavio's bedroom and points a gun at him. The next day some papers appear announcing Octavio's death, so Juana asks Fernanda what she did. After seeing the papers announcing his death, Octavio becomes furious so Carmelo tells him that the only one who could be behind all this is Fernanda. Octavio confronts Fernanda to ask her why she is attacking him, to which she replies that she is defending what belonged to her husband and they took it from her.
31	"Alerta sanitaria"	16 August 2021	3.7
Fernanda convinces the ranchers to stop selling to Octavio Toscano, so now they are all willing to go to Encino Alto. Octavio assures Rafael that Isabela is a good woman. César has his plan ready to take revenge on Octavio. Candela assures Rosalina that she already knows how to get Miriam out of her way. Pachita confesses to Leticia that she has never seen Rafael so happy since he met Fernanda. Julia decides to break up with Octavio, but he kisses her by force and assures her that he likes it better when she resists. Fernanda is the victim of a roadblock that prevents her from reaching Encino Alto. César arrives at the packing plant. Rafael sees that Julia insulted his friend Rigoberto and asks her to apologize to him. Fernanda arrives at the packing plant in search of an explanation, but she witnesses a misfortune. Julia feels that Octavio abused her.
32	"La venganza es un plato que se come frío"	17 August 2021	3.7
After the explosion at the packing plant, Fernanda becomes the main suspect in the bombing. Octavio assures Fernanda that the two of them could be a very good business team. Fernanda sees that a man is hiding in his truck and confronts him and discovers that it was him who attacked Octavio's packing plant, so she asks him for an explanation, otherwise they will believe that they are accomplices. Rafael comes to Fernanda's defense and is sure that she had nothing to do with the explosion at his father's company. Ángela and Rigoberto kiss each other on the mouth when they say goodbye, a situation that makes them nervous. Rafael informs Octavio that he canceled his trip to Italy and plans to stay in town to confront the family's enemies. Fernanda proposes to César to unite against Octavio and think of something that will not fail so that he pays for all the damage he has caused. Rafael confronts his father for blocking the sale to the cattle ranchers in Encino Alto.
33	"De esta tierra me sacan muerto"	18 August 2021	3.7
Rafael shows Isabela that he can now hold himself up without the aid of any apparatus, but he falls on the bed and she takes the opportunity to kiss him. Juana assures Fernanda that César is a dangerous man. Rafael asks Octavio if he knows the reasons why Fernanda hates the Toscano so much. César warns Antonio that he plans to stay in town and Germán assures Ángela that he finds it strange to see her having a relationship with the man who wanted Isabela. Fernanda assures Rafael that no Toscano is a trustworthy person, so he comments that she does not have the right to say that about his family. Julia makes it clear to Octavio that what he did to her was the worst humiliation. When Juana learns that César is going to work at the hacienda, she complains to Fernanda and Fernanda assures her that César is her friend, only because he is Octavio's enemy. César discovers the reasons why Fernanda hates Octavio. Isabela looks for Rigoberto, but he rejects her.
34	"Un precio muy alto"	19 August 2021	3.6
Miriam, seeing that Luis is making a jealous scene because of the package she received from Giliberto Fregoso, asks him not to ask her about him anymore and takes advantage of the fact that she is with him to make it clear that he is still the man of her life. Rafael discovers that his father has nothing to do with Fernanda's accusations against him. Julia asks Leticia to let her live in her house, since she has a lot of problems with Germán. Juana is upset to see that Fernanda is making decisions about the ranch without taking her into account, so she confronts her. Fernanda confesses to Rafael that there cannot be a relationship between the two of them, only because he is Octavio Toscano's son. Isabela seeks Rigoberto for intimacy, but he rejects her and tells her what the townspeople are whispering. Octavio informs Rafael that Fernanda gave a job to the man who tried to kill him years ago.
35	"Deja tus sentimientos a un lado"	20 August 2021	3.6
Fernanda assures Juana that she will continue with her plans against Octavio, so Juana breaks their relationship as partners and also ends their friendship. Octavio assures Rafael that as long as he defends Fernanda, she will stab them in the back. Rafael confesses to Isabela that he still loves Fernanda and asks her to leave the hacienda. César assures Fernanda that she cannot hate Octavio and at the same time love her son Rafael. Ángela confronts Julia and assures her that she is willing to tell Rafael the truth. Fernanda and César discover that Rafael sold all his cattle in Encino Alto, so he blocks their sale. Fernanda informs the ranchers that they will not be able to sell and they react upset. Carmelo assures Octavio that everything went as planned.
36	"Me equivoqué al quererte"	23 August 2021	3.7
Rigoberto confesses to Ángela that he is still in love with Isabela, but he will not allow her to continue playing with his feelings so he decides to use Ángela to make Isabela jealous. Fernanda confronts Rafael for what he did to her in Encino Alto. Rafael discovers that César lives at the ranch with Fernanda and does not hesitate to insult her, so she does not let him and gives him a slap, César comes to her defense and hits Rafael. Rafael warns Fernanda that he will never see her again. Julia assures Isabela that the role of loser does not suit her since she is not defeated yet, Isabela realizes that her mother lost the earring that her grandmother gave her. César apologizes to Fernanda for what happened with Rafael and assures her that he is willing to confess the whole truth. Leticia finds an earring in Octavio's desk and discovers his infidelity.
37	"El punto débil"	24 August 2021	3.7
César assures Fernanda that she is the best option to enter the Primor and thus know all of Octavio's movements. Rafael informs his father that he has already verified that Fernanda has the man who tried to kill him living on her ranch. César reveals to Fernanda what Octavio did to him. Fernanda accepts Rafael's proposal to fall in love again so that both she and César can take revenge on Octavio. Fernanda and Juana ask Gabriel, Sandra and Clara to decide with whom they will leave, since their deal as partners is dissolved. César believes that the best way for Fernanda to approach Rafael is with Germán and advises her that for a good start she should apologize to Octavio's son. Now that she knows that Rafael will inherit all the business, Isabela is convinced that she cannot leave him. Fernanda, ready to start with her plan, looks for Germán at his house, but finds Rafael with Isabela. Leticia informs Julia that Octavio has a lover and shows her the earring she found in his desk.
38	"Fernanda propone una tregua a Octavio"	25 August 2021	4.0
Sandra can't stand that David has preferred Clara, so she assures him that he doesn't know what he really has as a girlfriend, a situation that upsets Clara and she slaps her in the face. Fernanda believes that Rafael has already returned with Isabela. César assures Fernanda that she should be very careful with Rafael because women like her are hard to forget. César and Fernanda arrive at the 'Primor', but are threatened by Carmelo. Clara asks Flor for help. Octavio is surprised by Leticia's attitude. Fernanda manages to see Octavio and assures him that she and César are only looking to work in peace. Fernanda offers Rafael an apology for what happened in Encino Alto and he does not hesitate to let her know that she is always in his thoughts, but swears that he will forget her, so she surprises him by stealing a kiss.
39	"Revivió en mí el amor"	26 August 2021	3.7
Fernanda confesses to César that when she saw Rafael she only wanted to hug him and be with him and refuses to hurt him. César asks Fernanda to make up her mind to do justice to Santiago or forget everything and continue with Rafael. Martina looks for Octavio to inform him that she has decided to be the next mayor of Ichámal, but he rejects the idea, she assures him that it is not convenient to have her as an enemy. César confesses to Fernanda that he is falling in love with a woman who may not listen to him. Fernanda apologizes to Sandra and assures her that she should not have been so hard on her. Carmelo learns that Don Octavio chose Edgar to launch him as a candidate for the presidency of Ichámal. In front of Santiago's grave, Fernanda assures César that the only way to destroy Octavio is to marry Rafael. Leticia advises Carmelo to tell Rigoberto how much he loves him and suggests him to rebuild his life, since he will do very well.
40	"En este mundo nada más hay dolor"	27 August 2021	3.9
When Juana learns of Fernanda's plans, she asks her to think things through so that she does not hurt Rafael again and takes advantage of the fact that she is with her to ask her not to divide the ranch, Fernanda does not hesitate and gives her a big hug. Rigoberto assures Mary that her advice did not work and learns that Isabela is going to work at the packing plant. Rafael, upon seeing Fernanda at the party organized by the ranchers, does not hesitate to highlight her beauty, but Isabela provokes Fernanda's jealousy. Ángela tries to make up for Julia's snub to Germán. Rigoberto arrives drunk at the cattlemen's party ready to confess his feelings for Isabela, Rafael tries to calm him down, but he attacks him, a situation that Ángela takes advantage of to cover for her friend so as not to arouse suspicion. Rafael tells David that he wants to show Fernanda that he can be happy without her. Octavio looks for Fernanda and assures her that they are not for entertainment.
41	"El nosotros ya no existe"	30 August 2021	3.7
Leticia believes that Octavio's lover is at the ranchers' party, so she begins to drink and does not hesitate to confront him and warns him that she will not allow him to make fun of her. Ángela confesses to Rigoberto that she loves him and that is why she wants him to move past Isabela. Isabela asks Fernanda to disappear from Rafael's life. When Fernanda sees Isabela trying to humiliate her, she defends herself and leaves her silent. César puts his life in danger and rescues Clara from Flor's bar. Carmelo learns of Rigoberto's scandal at the ranchers' party and does not hesitate to hit him, Leticia, witnessing Rigoberto's aggression, comes to his defense. Rafael tells Octavio that he can rest assured that there is nothing going on with Fernanda. Rafael and Fernanda know that they cannot be friends, because they both like each other, so Fernanda asks him to make peace. After César's action to save Clara, Juana manages to accept him at the ranch. Fernanda continues with her plan for revenge.
42	"Será una desaparecida más"	31 August 2021	3.7
Fernanda receives a call to participate in the Feria Ganadera, César assures her that he finds it strange that out of the blue she is asked to participate in this event. Rigoberto apologizes to Rafael. Octavio is ready to get Fernanda out of his way. Rigoberto asks Isabela to show him that she loves him and she kisses him passionately. Clara is ready to confess the truth to David, but Sandra prevents her from doing so. Leticia threatens to divorce Octavio if she proves that he is unfaithful. Carmelo initiates a plan against Fernanda, so he makes a phone call to her. Fernanda regrets sending Rafael a message. David surprises Clara with a romantic dinner. Fernanda boards the van that will take her to the exhibition center; however, during the trip she realizes that they have taken a detour and fears for her life.
43	"Cásate conmigo"	1 September 2021	3.8
Rafael confesses to Fernanda that since he saw her he knew she was the woman he had dreamed of, so he asks her to spend their lives together. Octavio is upset with Carmelo when he learns that he did not manage to kidnap Fernanda. Rigoberto takes advantage of the presence of Leticia, Isabela and Julia to kiss Ángela and thus provoke the jealousy of the woman he loves. Rafael wants Fernanda to have the best time of her life and seeks to spoil her. Fernanda agrees to marry Rafael and they both swear eternal love to each other, he shares with her that he wants to give her the engagement ring as he considers himself a romantic. Fernanda chooses her engagement ring and assures Rafael that she doesn't want his parents to think she is a gold digger, Rafael doesn't hesitate to tell her how much he loves her.
44	"Estoy loca de amor por ti"	2 September 2021	3.5
During the evening, Fernanda shares with Rafael that she was an only child, since her mother died in an accident. Rafael assures her that he is Octavio's weak point and questions Fernanda about her anger towards her father. César confesses to Flor that he is in love with a great woman. Rafael realizes that his dad is at the bar, so when he tries to say hello, Fernanda asks him to leave. Leticia shares with Germán that thanks to an earring, she discovered that Octavio is unfaithful. Isabela complains to Ángela for accepting that Rigoberto kissed her, but she threatens to tell the truth. Octavio discovers Fernanda with Rafael and does not hesitate to confront her and reminds her of his warning.
45	"Me voy a casar con Fernanda"	3 September 2021	4.0
When Octavio learns that Rafael plans to marry Fernanda, he gets so angry that he does not hesitate to hit his son. Fernanda asks Octavio not to underestimate her because he does not know what she is capable of. Julia insists on linking Isabela to the Toscano family's plans. Octavio gets drunk and confesses to Carmelo that he and Rafael are in love with Fernanda. Rigoberto and Piro prevent Pachita from scolding Mary for what she did. Julia is upset to hear how Germán highlights Leticia's virtues. Rafael looks for Isabela to tell her that he has decided to marry Fernanda, Germán upon learning that Rafael is going to marry Fernanda does not hesitate to hit him for making fun of his daughter Isabela. César asks Fernanda not to forget the oath she swore to Santiago.
46	"Renuncio a ser tu hijo"	6 September 2021	4.1
Octavio confronts Rafael again and assures him that he will not allow him to destroy his life by marrying Fernanda, Leticia prevents Octavio from hitting her son. Julia informs Isabela that she is going to convince Rafael to get back together with her. Octavio assures Rafael that if he marries Fernanda he will not let her live in the hacienda, so she tries to blackmail him, but he does not fall into her game. Julia offers her help to Leticia to get Fernanda out of the Primor. After the strong argument with his father, Rafael thinks it is best to leave the hacienda, Juana asks Fernanda if she is willing to confess to Rafael who Santiago was in her life. Octavio tries to make Rafael believe that Fernanda is in a relationship with César, but seeing his attitude, he returns the bull necklace and says he is no longer his son. Juana learns that Octavio also harmed César's family.
47	"Ideas de justicia"	7 September 2021	3.5
When Octavio discovers that Carmelo had a detail with Leticia, he assures her that he didn't like that he wanted to surprise his wife, so he decides to fire him from the hacienda. Fernanda confesses to César that she hopes Rafael will not let himself be manipulated by his father. Octavio tries to convince Germán that Rafael and Isabela should return. Germán receives the divorce certificate and assures Julia that he will not sign it since he hopes to save their marriage, but she refuses to stay with him and Isabela questions her mother if there is already someone else in her life. César asks Fernanda to convince Rafael to live in El primor. Rafael believes that Rigoberto is upset with him for what he did to Isabela and questions him. Octavio and Leticia get back together. Fernanda learns that Octavio threw Rafael out of the hacienda and she assures him that they should live in El primor, a comment that makes her fiancé uncomfortable. Clara surprises Martina with her good manners, but Rafael is not well received by his friend's mother.
48	"Va a correr sangre"	8 September 2021	4.1
Isidoro López witnesses Rigoberto's fight at Flor's bar and does not hesitate to offer him a job, assuring him that between the two of them they can make a lot of money as long as he is willing to give his parents and his girlfriend a better life. Fernanda surprises Rafael with a dish and remembers Santiago. Miriam shows Candela that she didn't like the trap she set so she assures her that her friend paid the consequences. Fernanda lets César know that Rafael is upset that he is at the ranch. Tsubaki seeks Octavio to clarify the situation in which the packing plant has been involved and warns him that if he finds irregularities, he is willing to break off their working relationship. Juana and Fernanda learn that Luis has disappeared. Carmelo informs Rafael that he no longer works for Octavio and warns him to stay away from Fernanda because he does not know the damage she will cause him.
49	"Quiero ser tu socio"	9 September 2021	4.0
Isabela looks for Fernanda and tells her that she understands that she was very rude to her and assures her that she does not want them to be enemies, so she asks her to start over. Fernanda swears to Leticia that she is willing to defend Rafael even from his own father, an attitude that pleases Leticia and congratulates her. Octavio learns that Isabela made peace with Fernanda, in order to keep her close and get to know her weak point. Fernanda confesses to Rafael that Leticia talked to her. Miriam and Luis reconcile. Fernanda asks Rafael to reconcile with his father, but he refuses because he is very hurt by what he did to her. Rafael agrees to stay at the ranch in exchange for Fernanda and Juana agreeing to become his partners. Fernanda assures Rafael that César is sorry for what he did and has already paid for his mistake in jail; however, he is not very convinced since there is something about César that he does not like. Leticia finds Julia in her bedroom.
50	"Esa mujer es mía"	10 September 2021	3.7
César arrives to talk to Fernanda but Rafael refuses to let them talk alone, so to everyone's surprise, he tells them that he decided to resign. Fernanda tells César that he shouldn't have resigned but he replies that he has many differences with Rafael and it was for the best, although they will continue with their plans. Isabela is deeply depressed because of Rafael's attitude, so she tells Rigoberto that she was about to grab her father's gun and shoot herself, because she feels that no one loves her. Rafael wants to take his cattle but Octavio arrives and forbids him to do so, telling him that this is what he gets for turning his back on his family. Rafael is not willing to be blackmailed, so he tells him that he will get ahead on his own. Juana is very excited to know that the ranch 'Nuevo amanecer' will grow and will be beautiful, but at that moment Rafael appears to tell Fernanda that he fought with his father and returned everything he had given him, because he could not stand him humiliating him.
51	"Rafael pide la mano de Fernanda"	13 September 2021	3.8
Fernanda asks Rafael to approach his father and show him that he has a place for sanity, Rafael thanks his girlfriend for her good heart. Germán discovers that Ángela is in love with Rigoberto. Octavio and Martina have a confrontation. Octavio confronts Leticia when he sees that Rafael took his belongings and she assures him that she is not an employee to take orders. Ángela confirms to Germán that she is in love with Rigoberto, so she hopes Isabela values him. Rafael complains to Octavio for blocking his job and assures him that the only thing he will do is make him disappointed in him, Octavio reiterates that he does not ask for permission, much less offer apologies. Rigoberto arrives to work with Isidoro. Rafael, in the company of Fernanda's loved ones, asks for her hand and gives her the engagement ring that belonged to his grandmother and mother. Rafael becomes jealous when he sees César holding Fernanda's hand.
52	"Regalo de bodas"	14 September 2021	4.1
Rafael is willing to marry Fernanda in church, but she assures him that only in a civil ceremony because it is too expensive to marry in church. Rigoberto saves Isidoro's life. Rafael asks César to stay away from Fernanda. Fernanda asks César to be more careful since Rafael is very jealous and shares with him that she is afraid that he will reveal his plan before she can have the evidence against Octavio. Rigoberto shares with Isabela what Rafael thinks of her. Fernanda asks Rafael to invite her mother to be her wedding gift. Octavio discovers that Rafael is at the hacienda and makes him leave, but before leaving, Rafael assures him that he misses him. Fernanda prevents Rafael from seeing her wedding dress because it is bad luck and remembers the night before her wedding with Santiago and how he saw her in her dress and everything was a disgrace. Isabela learns that Rafael is marrying Fernanda. Carmelo gives a piece of land to Rigoberto.
53	"Una viuda"	15 September 2021	3.2
Fernanda decides to refuse the gifts that Isabela brought Rafael and assures him that these gifts were for him and Isabela not for their new marriage. Fernanda decides to invite Isabela to her wedding. Octavio tells Carmelo to take the money he gave him as a settlement as a gift. Rafael confronts Fernanda when he discovers that she is a widow and she assures him that she has her reasons for keeping this secret, Juana seeing what is happening with her friends confesses the whole truth to Rafael. Rigoberto surprises Isabela with a gift. Fernanda asks Rafael to forgive her since it is difficult for her to talk about what happened to her late husband, he reiterates that he will not bring up the subject again. Octavio threatens Leticia if she goes to Rafael and Fernanda's wedding, so she is not willing to fall for his blackmail. Rigoberto and Isabela have a very romantic night. Octavio still can't believe that Fernanda has set her sights on Rafael.
54	"Los declaro marido y mujer"	16 September 2021	4.1
Hours before marrying Rafael, Fernanda confesses to feeling confused because she doesn't know what to do and is ready to go away and start a new life; however, César arrives at her room and asks her to continue with the plan. Isabela brags to Ángela about how much fun she had with Rigoberto. Octavio reminds Julia of when she swore she was going to marry him, but preferred Germán's money. Full of emotion, Rafael confesses to Fernanda the reasons why he chose her to become his wife and promises to make up for every day of sadness with lots of love. Luis learns of Fernanda's plans against the Toscano’s and is disappointed in her. Fernanda and Rafael get married by all means. Fernanda, knowing that Juana and Luis have already discovered her plans for revenge, asks them to decide whether they support her or not, since she does not intend to stop. Fernanda challenges Luis to confess the truth to Rafael, but he decides not to. Rafael shows Fernanda how happy he is, but she begins to remember the day she married Santiago and fears she will experience something similar. Octavio arrives at Nuevo Amanecer.
55	"Vine a pedir perdón"	17 September 2021	3.9
Octavio arrives at Nuevo Amanecer looking for Rafael to ask for his forgiveness, Fernanda believes that her father-in-law's visit is because he is going to offer money to his son in exchange for leaving her; however, Octavio assures her that she has a very bad idea of him. Rafael tells Fernanda that his father wants to make peace with them. Rafael does not want to accept his father's proposal since he is sure that with the passage of time he will return to his old self, so he wants to avoid hurting his wife. Fernanda does not hesitate to show Rafael how much she loves him. Clara gives herself to David. Miriam and Luis get back together. Fernanda arrives at the Primor willing to speak the truth and shows Leticia and Octavio that she married Rafael with a pre-nuptial agreement, thus proving to them that she is not interested in his money. Fernanda promises Leticia that she will try to get Rafael to reconcile with Octavio. Julia becomes jealous of Ángela.
56	"Voy a correr el riesgo"	20 September 2021	4.1
Fernanda manages to convince Rafael to return to live with his parents so they make it official and Octavio returns the bull pendant to his son. Rosalina discovers that she is pregnant and Isabela does not hesitate to help her, but she actually has another objective. Octavio asks Julia to return home. Julia upon learning that Fernanda and Rafael are going to live in El primor, wants to humiliate her for what she did to Isabela, Octavio warns Julia that if she plans to continue living in the hacienda, she must be very careful how she speaks to his son and Fernanda. Isabela begins her plan against Rafael and Fernanda. Fernanda assures Juana that this time it is Octavio Toscano who will lose out, so she is willing to take the risk. Carmelo reminds Octavio of his love for Fernanda. Rafael confesses to his wife what his father's bull pendant means to him. Julia becomes jealous when she sees how Octavio looks at Fernanda. Ángela thinks that Rigoberto is involved in bad things.
57	"¿Enamorado y mal correspondido?"	21 September 2021	3.9
Octavio sees Fernanda in a bathing suit and does not hesitate to desire her, but he knows he must be more careful and looks for Julia to overflow his passion and confuses her again with his daughter-in-law. Octavio arrives at his son's room and welcomes them, so he seeks to hug Fernanda, but she rejects him, arguing that she is wearing a bathing suit. Isabela prepares her revenge against Rafael and asks her mother to stay out of it. Fernanda assures Juana that she does not want to kill Octavio, she is only looking for evidence against him. Rafael wants to be intimate with Fernanda and is rejected and she asks him for some time. Octavio asks Isabela to stay away from Rafael and much less go to the Primor, since his son is starting a new life. Leticia makes a loan to Rafael and Fernanda to build the ranch Nuevo amanecer. Octavio tells Rafael that the next time he needs money, he should ask him for it, as he feels very sorry for what happened. Carmelo informs Fernanda that Octavio is looking for her and asked her to go alone.
58	"Aquí se aparece el diablo"	22 September 2021	4.0
In order to get along better, Octavio decides to give Fernanda his horse Maharajá, but she surprises him with her decision. Fernanda learns about the irregularities at the packing plant, thanks to Edgar's indiscretion. Martina calls Fernanda a social climber in front of Leticia, so Leticia puts a stop to her friend and asks for more respect for her son Rafael's wife. Julia is indignant with Fernanda after she did not allow her to call her Fer. Leticia asks Fernanda to try to convince Rafael to take charge of the packing. Fernanda, upon learning of the irregularities at the packing house, agrees with César to attack Octavio. Julia asks Isabela to get pregnant by Rigoberto to complete her plan. Octavio learns that his packing plant will be closed.
59	"¿Estás embarazada?"	23 September 2021	3.9
Isabela informs Rafael that she is expecting his child, so he does not hesitate to support her and respond as a man. César asks Fernanda to find the documents of the lands that Octavio stole. When Octavio sees that the packing plant is being closed, he loses control, but Rafael calms him down and assures him that he needs a man who will look after his interests. Rafael asks Isabela for time to assimilate the news that he is going to be a father. Isabela confesses to Rigoberto that she deceived Rafael with her pregnancy, but Rigoberto won't allow his friend to be made fun of so he is willing to tell the truth, but Isabela forbids it by blackmailing him. David advises Rafael to tell Fernanda that Isabela is expecting his child. Isabela seeks Fernanda to tell her the truth.
60	"No me voy a divorciar"	24 September 2021	3.9
After learning that Fernanda and César are responsible for closing the packing plant, Juana and Luis assure them that if Octavio's company closes, many people will be unemployed. Isabela does not have the opportunity to reveal the truth to Fernanda. After learning that Isabela is expecting Rafael's child, Fernanda makes it clear that she will stay married to him and the baby will grow up with all the rights of a Toscano. Rosalina confirms to Luis that she is pregnant. César, upon learning that Isabela is expecting Rafael's child, assures Fernanda that this will block her plans, but she makes it clear that she will stay married to Octavio's son. Octavio warns Julia that if Isabela is not pregnant, it will be very bad for them. Fernanda confesses to Juana that she feels confused because she thought that Isabela was making up her pregnancy.
61	"El próximo alcalde de Ichámal"	27 September 2021	4.1
Fernanda can't stand the idea that Rafael is going to become a father, so she asks him not to touch her again. Rigoberto is ordered to steal all the Corcuera family's cattle. Pachita discovers that Mary left with Piero. After the theft of the cattle, Octavio questions Rigoberto and Carmelo about what happened at the Corcuera hacienda, but they assure him that they know nothing. Fernanda agrees to bring Mary back to the hacienda. Piero tells Mary that they must make things right. Rafael meets Brenda after they almost had a car accident. Martina learns that Octavio has been chosen as a candidate for mayor of Ichámal and reminds her that he warned her not to mess with him. Octavio enters Fernanda's room to spy on her while she is taking a bath. Rafael, seeing that Brenda is very nervous after learning that her father has had an accident, offers to take her to the hospital.
62	"Ahora será diferente"	28 September 2021	3.8
Julia and Isabela surprise Leticia by showing her their purchases of the first baby clothes, a situation that makes Rafael's mother uncomfortable and she asks them to have respect for Fernanda. Octavio sends Tsubaki out of his way and rewards Carmelo very well. Fernanda shows César the gun she bought for herself, as she plans to defend herself against Octavio with it, and confesses that she discovered him spying on her while she was taking a bath. Isabela continues to use Rigoberto to get pregnant. Octavio informs Leticia that he is running to become the next mayor of Ichámal. Fernanda manages to enter Octavio's office, but is discovered by Carmelo who assures her that neither the living nor the dead can be in his boss's office, so she apologizes and leaves. Fernanda assures Octavio that he will get to know her as she really is, so the misunderstandings are forgotten, Octavio tries to kiss her, but she avoids it. Rigoberto finds Mary in Flor's bar and decides to rescue her.
63	"¿Estás celosa de Brenda?"	29 September 2021	3.7
After learning the reasons why Piero left Mary, Rigoberto decides to look for Piero to beat him up and let him know that Mary is not alone. Brenda apologizes to Rafael. Fernanda decides to surprise Rafael in the city so she asks Leticia for permission for one of the workers to take her, but Octavio overhears her and kindly offers to take her. Fernanda finds Rafael with Brenda and gets upset. Julia victimizes Isabela in front of Leticia. Fernanda expresses her jealousy to Rafael after she finds him with Brenda while holding her hand. Octavio confesses to Rafael and Fernanda that he is going to run for mayor for Ichámal, but Rafael gets upset because he and Fernanda are going to support David. Fernanda receives a message from César and Rafael wants to hear it.
64	"Voy a luchar por él"	30 September 2021	3.8
Rafael gets the closure seals removed from his father's packing plant. Brenda makes Fernanda have an uncomfortable moment when she asks her if she is pregnant. Ángela returns to Ichámal and confesses to Isabela that she will not allow her to make fun of Rigoberto since she is in love with him and warns her that she will fight for his love. Fernanda asks César not to send her messages as it gets her in trouble with Rafael. Isabela tries to catch Rafael's attention with her supposed pregnancy, but he assures her that as a father he will respond, but she must understand that he has a wife and cannot neglect her, so he promises to give her a house and child support so that they do not lack anything. Octavio does not hesitate to spy on Fernanda when he sees her in a bathing suit, but he is discovered by Julia, who cannot believe that Octavio has fallen in love with his son's wife.
65	"Isabela sí está embarazada"	1 October 2021	4.0
Fernanda assures Octavio that they will be fighting if she agrees to work with him and thanks him for taking her into account for his projects, even though it would be a challenge for both of them. Octavio forbids Julia to be jealous of him with Fernanda or any other woman, since he will only allow it to his wife. Germán overhears the conversation between Rigoberto and Isabela and discovers that his daughter is not pregnant, so he will not accept her lies and demands that she reveal the truth. Isabela plays the victim in front of Rafael. Octavio tries to hide the jealousy he feels when he sees his son with Fernanda. Ángela tells Rigoberto that Isabela is only using him to make her pregnancy lie work and takes the opportunity to confess that she loves him and they give in to passion, but he assures her that he only wants her as a friend. Julia provokes Fernanda with the supposed baby, but Fernanda puts her in her place. Isabela fears that Rafael will discover that she is not pregnant, so she tries to buy off the doctor who is going to treat her, but during the check-up, she discovers that she really is pregnant.
66	"El precio que tengo que pagar"	4 October 2021	3.9
César begins to give Fernanda lessons so that she can defend herself when she feels in danger being with Octavio. Julia apologizes to Germán for the way she treated him and assures him that she made up the pregnancy story because they were desperate, so she asks him to sustain the lie. Julia learns that Isabela is pregnant. Octavio, unable to keep the appointment with Brenda, engages Rafael to represent him; however, Rafael gets upset and assures him that he cannot use his time. Fernanda becomes jealous when she hears what Rafael means to Brenda. Isabela proves to Germán that she is pregnant. Rafael makes it clear to Isabela that he does plan to give her a house, but it will be small because he does not have enough capital for a luxurious house. Fernanda surprises Octavio in his office and does not hesitate to seduce him with her white dress and assures him that the only man she is interested in is him and kisses him. Octavio has other intentions between Brenda and Rafael.
67	"No voy a renunciar a mi hijo"	5 October 2021	4.2
Julia takes advantage of the fact that she is with Octavio to kiss him, but she does not imagine that she is discovered by Isabela, who does not hesitate to confront her. Rigoberto learns that Isabela is pregnant. Octavio wants Rafael to be interested in Brenda. Rigoberto assures Isabela that if she only used him to get pregnant, he will not forgive her and is ready to confess the truth, but she manages to calm him down. Octavio is upset to see César in Nuevo amanecer. Julia, knowing that Rigoberto is willing to fight for his son, does not hesitate to insult him, but Leticia overhears the discussion and forbids her to mess with her employees, especially Rigoberto, who is part of the family. Fernanda wants to take advantage of the fact that Octavio is in love with her to complete her revenge.
68	"Solo el diablo puede ayudar"	6 October 2021	4.2
Octavio sees that Alberto Tsubaki is still alive and asks Carmelo to kill him, otherwise he will make an attempt on Rigoberto's life. Octavio and David start their electoral campaign. Carmelo is ready to kill Alberto, but just as he is about to carry out Octavio's order, he is surprised by Rafael and Brenda who question his visit. Fernanda is happy that Octavio has done well in the beginning of his political campaign, but she assures him not to be confident because his opponents can give him a fight and it will show who will fulfill the promises made to the people. Octavio asks Isabela to find the ideal excuse for her to return to live in Primor so she can separate Rafael and Fernanda and assures her that she will have his full support. Rafael questions César about the idea of Fernanda no longer living at the hacienda. Isabela asks Julia to stay out of his plans, otherwise, she does not know how she will respond. Fernanda is forceful with Octavio and rejects his gift.
69	"Amenaza de aborto"	7 October 2021	3.9
Octavio is attacked again with another message written in the packing plant, Germán assures him that this situation could affect his campaign as well as his business. Fernanda assures Rafael that it bothers her that Isabela uses her son as an excuse to get close to him. Fernanda arrives at the packing plant to inform Octavio that she agrees to work with him, but under certain conditions. Rafael announces to Octavio that Alberto has died. Rigoberto tells Isabela that the day they leave the hacienda, he will also take his father with him. Rafael believes that César is to blame for the attack on his father at the packing plant, so he confronts him and asks him to leave them alone. Octavio celebrates that things are going as he planned. Isabela has a bleeding while she is at the hacienda so she alerts everyone, the doctor informs Leticia and Julia that she suffered a threatened abortion, so she must have absolute rest. Leticia makes the decision that Isabela will stay to live in El Primor.
70	"En el pecado llevas la penitencia"	8 October 2021	4.0
Leticia informs Octavio that Isabela almost had a miscarriage, so she decided to let her stay at El Primor. Octavio tells Fernanda that he thinks it would be convenient for Brenda to spend a few days at the hacienda. Luis gets jealous when he sees Miriam and César getting closer. Leticia informs Fernanda that Isabela has suffered bleeding and the doctor asked her to rest. Octavio puts a stop to Julia and demands that she not question the Toscano family's decisions. Octavio arrives at the hacienda and assures Isabela that it is not necessary to pretend and makes it clear that now she has exceeded his expectations, so he asks her to be discreet and little by little Rafael will get closer to her. Fernanda reveals to Germán that Octavio is the owner of the estate Los laureles, he confronts him when he learns that his friend took his patrimony. Martina discovers Clara's past. David is already thinking about asking for Clara's hand.
71	"Eres parte de la familia"	11 October 2021	4.1
Fernanda finds a list of the people from whom Octavio supposedly bought their land to build the packing plant and after an investigation, she discovers that most of them died tragically, so she informs Juana and Luis and they join her in her plan for revenge. Octavio makes Germán believe that he bought 'Los laureles' to give it to his grandson. Octavio takes advantage of an intimate encounter with Julia to inform her that he is going to return her ranch now that his grandson will be born, so she does not hesitate to please him. Ángela learns that Isabela is expecting Rigoberto's child. After her father's death, Brenda accepts Octavio's invitation and decides to stay a few days at Primor. Fernanda, seeing the attitude Brenda has taken with Rafael, asks her not to call him guardian angel because he is not. Martina assures Octavio that she has evidence against him, so he feels attacked and hits her.
72	"Una aventura excitante"	12 October 2021	4.1
Brenda apologizes to Fernanda for the misunderstandings with Rafael and asks her not to be jealous since that is not her intention, so she is determined to leave the ranch; however, Fernanda prevents her so they become friends. Octavio is sure that Fernanda will be his again. Fernanda, seeing that she could be in danger being alone with Octavio, decides to invite Sandra for a walk. Isabela learns that Rafael wants Rigoberto to be the godfather of her son, but she rejects him, so she is determined to end up with the man she truly loves. Fernanda opens her heart to Brenda and tells her story with Santiago and how everything beautiful she was living with him turned into a nightmare. Sandra is willing to reveal to Octavio everything Fernanda does. Brenda seeks to know the reasons why her mother doesn't love her. Fernanda assures Juana that she will warn Sandra to watch out for Octavio.
73	"Fernanda, te amo"	13 October 2012	3.9
Miriam learns that Luis has already given an engagement ring to Rosalina, so he asks for her forgiveness for not keeping his word as a man. Octavio feels betrayed by Rafael since he has not shown his loyalty and is sure that Fernanda will not betray him. Viviana arrives at 'El Primor' ready to demand part of the inheritance from Brenda, so she takes the opportunity to reveal the reasons why she does not love her, Fernanda seeing the aggressions that Brenda is suffering, does not hesitate to defend her. Fernanda has a nightmare about Octavio. César does not hesitate to kiss Fernanda and confess his feelings, but she decides to walk away. Julia asks Isabela to convince Ángela that the child she is expecting is indeed Rafael's. Juana will give Fernanda a warning.
74	"Ya no puedo estar sin ti"	14 October 2021	3.7
Octavio takes advantage of Fernanda's distraction to touch her again, but she gets scared. Brenda tells Octavio that Leticia is very affectionate to the point that she has already adopted her as her daughter. Mary agrees to be Gabriel's girlfriend. Ángela discovers that Isabela is trying to use her to continue with her plans, she puts a stop to it and decides to walk away, Rafael asks Isabela for an explanation. Gabriel rushes Rosalina to the hospital. Fernanda enters Octavio's office looking for evidence against him, but when she is discovered she assures him that she did not resist sitting in his chair. César asks Fernanda to forgive him so that they can continue with their plan for revenge. Octavio confesses to Fernanda what she means to him, but Rafael discovers them.
75	"La señora de las buenas costumbres"	15 October 2021	3.6
Rafael finds Fernanda crying over Santiago's grave, so she reveals to him that he was her husband and she always carries him in her heart wherever she goes. Julia tells Rigoberto to leave or she will say that he is forcing himself on Isabela. When Rigoberto leaves, Julia slaps Isabela telling her that she is not willing to lose the ranch because of him. Rafael tells Brenda that Fernanda does not trust him by not telling him the truth about Santiago. Brenda decides to reserve a place to take Rafael out to eat and get rid of his sadness, but Fernanda arrives at that moment and ruining her chance.
76	"Quedar como el héroe"	18 October 2021	4.2
Octavio announces that he managed to recover the hacienda 'Los laureles', so when his grandson is born he is going to give it to him as a gift, this news bothers Fernanda. Octavio is sure that Fernanda could save herself a lot of trouble by being with him. Rafael confronts his father about the gift he is going to give his baby. Octavio finds out that Rafael and Fernanda are going to meet in the river to enjoy themselves as a couple, so he prevents that from happening and decides to surprise Fernanda by going skinny-dipping. Germán suspects that Octavio did let him down, but Fernanda asks him not to say anything so as not to alert him. During a political act, a supporter of Octavio assures that he cannot trust David's word, since if he lied to them about his future wife's past, he will most likely not fulfill his campaign promises. Clara, upon hearing the statements, does not hesitate to confess the truth to David. César manages to have evidence of Octavio's infidelity.
77	"El hijo que espera Isabela es mío"	19 October 2021	4.4
Clara assures David that she always wanted to confess her past to him, but he always refused to listen to her, Fernanda tells Clara that she is not to blame for what happened. Octavio celebrates that after David's scandal with Clara, his votes increased. Rafael does not accept that Clara has lied to his friend, so Fernanda comes to Clara’s defense and assures him that she has her reasons. Octavio, seeing what Fernanda is doing with the press, assures Rafael that she has already crossed the limit, so he emphasizes that if he is thinking of divorcing her, he has all his support. Rigoberto decides to confess to Rafael that the baby Isabela is expecting is his, so they beat each other up, Isabela in her defense says that Rigoberto abused her, but he denies it. Carmelo begs Rigoberto not to steal from Octavio, since he does forget betrayals and reveals that he is Octavio's thug.
78	"La muerte de Rigoberto"	20 October 2021	4.8
Fernanda proves her loyalty to Rafael once again, so she confronts the men who have broken in to rob the Primor, Rigoberto is injured during the assault. Carmelo comes clean with Leticia. Carmelo sees his wounded son and tries to save his life, but it is too late, so he tells him how much he loves him, Rigoberto dies in his arms. Carmelo blames Isabela for what happened to his son. Carmelo reports that Rigoberto died during the assault and thanks Rafael for having loved his son as a brother, so he asks him to forgive him so that he can rest in peace. Julia, upon learning of Rigoberto's death, is grateful for what happened, but Isabela is filled with contempt for her mother and kicks her out of her room. Pachita suffers for Rigoberto's death.
79	"Esta vez te tocó perder"	21 October 2021	4.7
Octavio goes crazy when he learns that David is the new mayor of Ichámal, so he raises his voice to Leticia, but Germán defends her. Ángela and David learn of Rigoberto's death. César warns Fernanda that he will kill Octavio. When Octavio learns of the millions he lost by the theft his cattle, he begins to feel pain in his arm, a situation that worries Rafael. Ángela gives her condolences to Carmelo. Mary gives Isabela the box where Rigoberto kept all the photos he had with her, as well as her letters. Sandra does not hesitate to tell Octavio that Fernanda and César have another kind of relationship. Juana sets a trap for Sandra.
80	"¡Fernanda es amante de César Franco!"	22 October 2021	4.3
Julia finds some compromising photos of Fernanda with César and uses them to her advantage. Octavio gives Carmelo the order to kill Sandra. Octavio shows Rafael the photos of Fernanda kissing César. Rafael assures Isabela that Ángela confessed the whole truth, so he wants nothing to do with her. Antonio tries to win Mary's affection. Rafael decides to confront Fernanda for her betrayal, but when he arrives at Nuevo Amanecer he finds her with César and assures César that he can have her. Carmelo complies with Octavio's order and kills Sandra. César, Miriam and Luis manage to kidnap Carmelo to take him to Octavio's cabin and thus learn all the secrets of his boss. Once again, Fernanda prevents Octavio from hurting her, thanks to Juana's help.
81	"Poner las cartas sobre la mesa"	25 October 2021	4.6
Octavio tries to abuse Fernanda again, but she defends herself and hits him. Octavio assures Rafael that Fernanda offered herself to him in exchange for forgiving César. Fernanda reveals to Rafael and Leticia that Octavio is a murderer since he built his packing plant on the patrimony of innocent people, he denies all the accusations, but she shows the video where Octavio is unfaithful to Leticia with Julia. Leticia slaps Julia after learning of her deception. Julia tries to play the victim, but Leticia no longer believes her. Fernanda reveals that Octavio raped her. Leticia assures Germán that the two of them should have married, so they kiss. Pachita confesses to David that Mary is his sister and asks him to take care of her.
82	"Solo me usaste"	26 October 2021	4.9
After learning that Mary is his sister, David, with the help of José, obtains a saliva test to perform the DNA test, David assures Mary that from now on he will take care of her, but Piero overhears him and misunderstands the situation. Isabela confesses to Fernanda that her mother wants to hurt her baby. Carmelo finds out that Fernanda's friends entered the cabin, so Octavio asks him to take revenge on Luis with what hurts him the most. Candela, seeing that Miriam is in danger, decides to impersonate her and is kidnapped. The doctor informs the family that Isabela lost her baby. Isabela thanks Fernanda for saving her life and takes the opportunity to ask her forgiveness and assures her that by following her mother's advice she only disappointed the people she loved the most. Carmelo learns of his grandson's death and bursts into tears. Isabela says goodbye to her baby.
83	"Hazte a un lado"	27 October 2021	4.9
Fernanda apologizes to Leticia and assures her that all she wanted was to show Rafael who his father is. Pachita tells Carmelo that she already knows about his feelings for Leticia. Fernanda wants Octavio dead. Octavio begs Leticia for a chance, but she no longer wants him in her life. Isabela buries her baby and Ángela manages to forgive her. César confesses to Rafael all the harm Octavio did to him, but he won't listen to reason. Brenda tells Fernanda that she is not convinced by her version so now she is willing to fight for Rafael and asks her to let her have her way. Brenda takes advantage of Rafael’s sadness to kiss him. Octavio tries to suffocate Julia.
84	"Gracias por todo el amor"	28 October 2021	4.9
Julia informs Isabela that Octavio threw her out of the cabin, so she begs her to give her money so she won't stay in the street, Isabela rejects her and asks her not to look for her. Rafael makes a request to his father. Fernanda refuses to sign the notice of the divorce, but she is told that if she does not attend she could be affected. David reveals to Antonio that Mary is his daughter. Pachita comes to Leticia's defense and confronts Octavio. Fernanda interns to talk to Rafael, but he asks her to sign the divorce since he does not want to see her again. Leticia has a fierce fight with Octavio, for which she kicks him out of the Primor, assuring him that she is the owner of the ranch and the packing plant. Carmelo, knowing the damage Antonio did to Pachita, does not hesitate to leave him seriously wounded. Pachita is rushed to the hospital and dies in the arms of her granddaughter Mary.
85	"Reniego de tu sangre"	29 October 2021	5.1
Rafael assures Fernanda that everyone is going through a difficult time and asks for a truce. Germán gives Rafael information to prove that Fernanda is not lying. David turns his father in to the authorities. Fernanda proves to Rafael that Santiago's signature is not the same on the marriage certificate as on the sales contract made by Octavio and confesses that she was the one who shot him, since she thought she had fallen in love with her rapist. Carmelo agrees to kill Leticia. Carmelo confesses to Leticia that Octavio did rape Fernanda and murder Santiago and reveals that the next victim is her, but first he expresses his feelings. Octavio is determined to abuse Fernanda again, but Rafael arrives to defend her and hits his father, Octavio seeing that his son turned his back on him tries to shoot him, but Fernanda gets in the way and is shot. Carmelo shoots Octavio. Julia, seeing herself without money, starts working in Flor's bar and calls herself Venenosa. David manages to put his mother in jail and she is filled with hatred towards her son. Octavio swears to return to take revenge for what Fernanda and Rafael did to him.

== Reception ==
=== Critical reception ===
Writing for Milenio, Álvaro Cueva predicted that La desalmada will be the most-watched telenovela in Mexico by stating, "something tells me that this is going to become a cultural reference that is more powerful than the versions of Rubí and Teresa made by this great producer. This is a José Alberto Castro traditional elevated to the n-th power, with all this experience, but refined and enhanced with the technical and editorial possibilities of 2021." He added that the story has "all the love, but also the female empowerment, the family values, and the search for justice." Cueva praised La desalmada as a magnificent serialized melodrama with colossal mastery for its cast, storyline, theme song, musical scoring, editing, locations, camera direction and image design. He also congratulated the telenovela for its deserving success by stating, "not only they're doing a great job, they're proving that telenovelas are more alive than ever, that there is nothing more powerful than free-to-air television, and that the traditional Mexican telenovela continues to be the queen of the market."

La desalmada was also honored as the only Latino fiction title highlighted by The Wit's Fresh TV Fiction session at the MIPCOM.

=== Ratings ===
Viewership and ratings per season of La desalmada
Season	Timeslot (CT)	Episodes	First aired		Last aired		Avg. viewers (millions)
Season	Timeslot (CT)	Episodes	Date	Viewers (millions)	Date	Viewers (millions)	Avg. viewers (millions)
1	Mon–Fri 9:30 p.m.	85	5 July 2021	3.0	29 October 2021	5.1	3.90

=== Awards and nominations ===
Year	Award	Category	Recipient	Results	Ref.
2022	Premios Juventud	My Favorite Actor	José Ron	Nominated	
2022	Premios Juventud	Best On-Screen Couple	Livia Brito & José Ron	Nominated	
