= Amparo Grisales =

Colombian actress (born 1956)

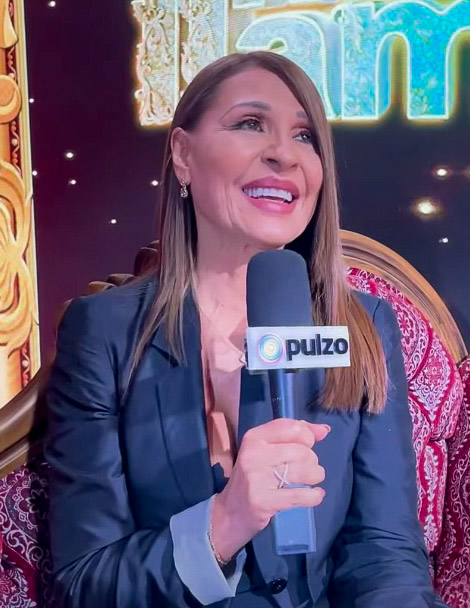
- Amparo Grisales in 2023
- Born: Amparo Grisales Patiño; 19 September 1956 (age 69); Manizales, Caldas, Colombia
- Occupations: Actress; model; television judge
- Years active: 1971–present
- Known for: Yo me llamo, Madre Luna
- Spouse: Germán Tessarolo (separated)
- Parents: Gustavo Grisales; Delia Patiño

Amparo Grisales de Tessarolo (née Grisales Patiño; 19 September 1956) is a Colombian actress. Best known for her role as Lucrecia Rivas in The Mafia Dolls. Also starred in the 2007 Telemundo serial Madre Luna ("Mother Moon"). She also appeared with tenor Plácido Domingo in a music video of the Peruvian song, "La Flor de la Canela", from his 1994 Grammy-nominated album, De Mi Alma Latina.

== Career ==
Grisales acted in telenovelas En cuerpo ajeno and La sombra del deseo.

After living in Los Angeles for several years, she returned to Colombia to star in Madre Luna opposite Gabriel Porras in a role written for her. As RTI had begun co-producing series with the much larger Telemundo, she hoped to benefit from the airing of Madre Luna to US viewers and then return to Los Angeles.

In 2011, Grisales began judging the reality show Yo me llamo. As of January 2022, she remains with the program.
