= Madre Luna =

- Developed by: Julio Jiménez, Iván Martínez Lozano
- Starring: Amparo Grisales; Gabriel Porras; Michel Brown; Alex Sirvent; Arap Bethke; Ana Lucía Domínguez; Mónica Dionne; Saby Kamalich
- Opening theme: "Madre Luna"; Adriana Ferrer
- Composer: Héctor Cardona Jr.
- Countries of origin: Colombia; United States
- Original language: Spanish
- No. of episodes: 141

Production
- Executive producer: Hugo León Ferrer
- Producer: Jorge Sastoque Roa
- Production locations: Bogotá and Girardot, Colombia
- Editor: José Luis Varón
- Camera setup: Multi-camera
- Running time: 42-45 minutes

Original release
- Network: Telemundo
- Release: July 2, 2007 – January 28, 2008

Related
- Marina; La traición

Madre Luna is a Spanish-language telenovela produced by the United States–based television network Telemundo and RTI Colombia. This limited-run series, also known as Grains of Love, debuted on July 2, 2007. Julio Jiménez developed the story as a vehicle for the actor Amparo Grisales. The show scored a 35 percent share of the Colombian audience during the summer of 2007. During November 2007, it averaged 571,000 core adult (ages 18–49) viewers. Luna's final episode aired Monday, January 28, 2008.

== Story ==
The series centers on Alejandra Aguirre (Amparo Grisales), a 50-year-old rice farmer living in the rural town of Castellón. She becomes involved in a romantic conflict between Leonardo Cisneros (Gabriel Porras) and his son Ángel (Michel Brown).

Years earlier, Leonardo had an affair with Alejandra, fathering her children Valentin and Demetrio, while concealing that he was already married to Flavia (Mónica Dionne), who is the mother of his son Ángel, for three years. Upon discovering his marriage, Alejandra ended the relationship and raised her children independently on land provided by Leonardo in Castellón.

When Leonardo re-enters her life, their renewed relationship draws hostility from Flavia's mother, Doña Trinidad Zapata (Saby Kamalich), estate manager Tirso Reinoso (Paulo Quevedo), who oversees the Cisneros property, and Comandante Veneno (Mauricio Aspe), leader of the Sierra Brigade.

Concurrently, Leonardo's son Ángel pursues a relationship with Alejandra, unaware of her history with his father. Meanwhile, Alejandra's sons, Valentin and Demetrio, both compete for the affections of Flavia's niece, Anabel Saldaña (Ana Lucía Domínguez). The overarching narrative explores class divides and intergenerational conflict between the wealthy Cisneros family and the local farming community.

== Title ==
The title Madre Luna refers to a recurring character in children's stories that Alejandra told her sons during their childhood. According to Telemundo's English promotional materials, the moon symbolizes the series' two female leads, Alejandra and Anabel.

== Production ==
Madre Luna is the last Telemundo-produced telenovela filmed in NTSC resolution. Variety called the show "exquisitely lensed," featuring "bronzed bodies, revealing dresses, hacienda lust and luxury, and pop scoring". Madre Luna is shot in Colombia and vehicles in the show bear yellow Colombian license plates. Jiménez said the setting is an imaginary locale inspired by Colombia's rice fields Despite the setting, Telemundo made product placement deals to promote Windex, Splenda and other U.S. brands during the show.

In addition, Telemundo is expected to air 130 hours of Madre Luna from Monday to Friday over about six months. As with most of its soap operas, the network broadcasts English subtitles as closed captions on CC3. This show replaced Marina in Telemundo's 8 p.m. ET/PT time slot.

== Changes ==
When Telemundo announced Madre Luna in May 2006, the original premise differed from the final version. Amparo Grisales was initially cast as Leonor Aguirre, a widow who returns to Castellón and falls in love with a younger man.

The primary antagonist, Isadora, was written to plot against Leonor after suspecting a past affair with her husband, leading to rumors that incite villagers to attack Leonor's home and kill her eldest son, driving a story centered on revenge.

Actor Javier Gómez was originally cast in a major role, but departed the project to join the cast of another Telemundo series, Sin Vergüenza.

== Cast ==
Actor	Character
Amparo Grisales	Alejandra Aguirre
Gabriel Porras	Leonardo Cisneros
Michel Brown	Ángel Cisneros Portillo
Mónica Dionne	Flavia Portillo Zapata de Cisneros
Arap Bethke	Demetrio Aguirre / Demetrio Cisneros Aguirre
Alex Sirvent	Valentín Aguirre / Valentín Cisneros Aguirre
Ana Lucía Domínguez	Anabel Saldaña Portillo
Saby Kamalich	Doña Trinidad "Trini" Zapata Vda. de Portillo
Judy Henríquez	Angustias García
Paulo César Quevedo	Tirso Reinoso
Mauricio Aspe	Román Garrido "Veneno"
Adriana Campos	Zulma Moreno
Daniela Tapia	Dulce Elena Márquez
José Saldarriaga	Fidelio Márquez
Julio del Mar	Ignacio Morales
Ana Beatriz Osorio	Violeta Cordero
Sebastián Boscán	Erasmo Casilimas
Pedro Roda	Bebo Cantillo
Alejandra Pinzón	Juana López
Mónica Pardo	Luzmila Morales
Sandra Guzmán	Marcela Pizarro
Gabriel González	Rosito Bocanegra
Margarita Durán	Berta
Freddy Ordóñez	Emilio Morales
Luz Stella Luengas	Irene de Márquez
Sigifredo Vega	Basilio Márquez
Maria Claudia Torres	Séfora
Maria Margarita Amado	Verónica
Olga Lucía Rojas	Marieta
Dorian Díaz	
Mauricio Alvarez	
Orlando Lamboglia	
Maria Angela Cubillos	
Jairo López	
Orlando Bonnet	
María Cristina Montoya	
Daniel Merizalde	
Ivette Zamora	
Toto Vega	
Nure Valbuena	
Antonio Puentes	
Richard Martínez	
Aída Bossa	

== Broadcasters ==
Country	Alternate title/Translation	TV network(s)	Series premiere	Series finale	Weekly schedule	Timeslot
United States	Madre Luna	Telemundo	July 2, 2007	January 28, 2008	Monday to Friday	20:00
Mexico	Madre Luna	Galavisión; Azteca 7 (rerun)	September 3, 2007; September 3, 2012	April 11, 2008; April 12, 2013	Monday to Friday	22:30; 22:15
Spain	Madre Luna	Antena 3	August 20, 2007	-	Monday to Friday	16:30
Serbia	Plamen ljubavi	Fox televizija	June 18, 2008	December 30, 2008	Monday to Friday	15:45
Bulgaria	Зрънце любов	bTV	September 9, 2007	April 14, 2008	Monday to Friday	17:00
Croatia	Plamen ljubavi	Doma TV	August 6, 2012	February 25, 2013	Monday to Friday	15:00/14:00
Armenia	Մայր Լուսին	SHANTTV	September 16, 2008	January 16, 2009	Monday to Friday	18:10
Argentina	Madre Luna	Telecentro TV	March 20, 2012	September 21, 2012	Monday to Friday	19:00
Paraguay	Madre Luna	Magna TV	February 13, 2012	August 12, 2012	Monday to Friday	18:55
