= Mónica Dionne =

American actress

- Born: Mónica Xóchitl Dionne Lazo; February 7, 1967 (age 58); Waterbury, Connecticut, U.S.
- Occupation: Actress

Mónica Xóchitl Dionne Lazo (born February 7, 1967) is an American actress born in Waterbury, Connecticut. She is of Mexican descent. Dionne is best known for her roles in telenovelas produced by TV Azteca. She also acted in movies such as Sexo, pudor y lágrimas where she played the role of "María".

In 2007 she played the role of Flavia Portillo de Cisneros in the telenovela Madre Luna.

== Filmography ==
Year	Title	Role	Notes
1994	Prisionera de amor	Teté	
1996	Nada personal	Alicia	Main cast
1999	Sexo, pudor y lágrimas	María	
2003	Mirada de mujer, el regreso	Paloma Santiago	
2007-2008	Madre Luna	Flavia Portillo Zapata de Cisneros	
2010	No eres tú, soy yo	Dra. Villar	
2014	Cuatro lunas	Aurora	
2016	No Manches Frida	Miss Gaby	
2017	La querida del Centauro	Leticia Solís	Season 2
2018	El club de los insomnes	Dr. Alejandra	
2018	Señora Acero	Rebeca Londoño	Season 5
2021	Si nos dejan	Rebecca	Main cast
2022-23	La mujer del diablo	Cayetana de Vallejo	Main cast
2022	Esta historia me suena	Macaria	Episode: "Me gusta"
2022	Sexo, pudor y lágrimas 2	María	
2024	Un buen divorcio	Gladys	Episode: "Baja el telón"
2024-25	El extraño retorno de Diana Salazar	Delfina	Recurring role
2024-25	Las hijas de la señora García	Graciela Portilla	Main cast
