= José Ron =

Mexican actor (born 1981)

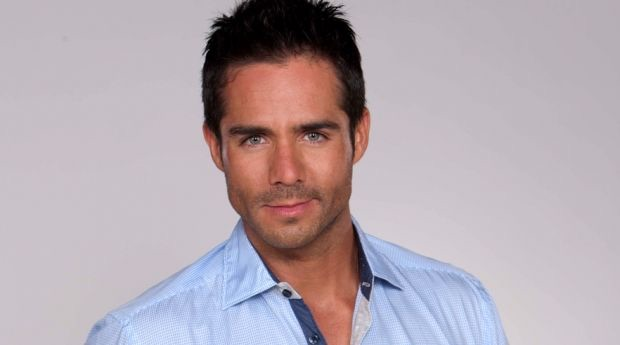
- Born: Édgar José Ron Vázquez; August 6, 1981 (age 45); Guadalajara, Jalisco, Mexico
- Occupation: Actor
- Years active: 2002–present
- Parents: Rómula Vázquez Castro (mother); Jacinto Ron Rodríguez (father)
- Relatives: Daniel Vázquez (brother); Alejandro Vázquez (brother); Julio Vázquez (brother)

Édgar José Ron Vázquez (born August 6, 1981), is a Mexican television actor best known for his roles in telenovelas such as Juro que te amo, Los exitosos Pérez, La que no podía amar, La mujer del Vendaval and Muchacha italiana viene a casarse.

== Personal life ==
Ron is the son of Rómula Vázquez Castro and Jacinto Ron Rodríguez. He has three brothers named Daniel Vázquez, Alejandro Vázquez and Julio Vázquez.

== Career ==
=== 2004-10: Early in his career ===
José Ron left his hometown of Guadalajara at age 18 to study acting in the "Centro de Actuación de Televisa". Ron began his acting career in 2004 on the telenovela Mujer de madera with Edith González, Ana Patricia Rojo, Jaime Camil and Gabriel Soto. In 2005 he participated in the television series Bajo el mismo techo, where he appeared in 11 episodes. In 2006 he participated in the third season of the telenovela Rebelde where he played Enzo. In this telenovela he shared credits with Maite Perroni, Dulce María, Anahí, Christian Chávez and Alfonso Herrera. In 2006, Ron was one of the protagonist in the telenovela Código postal, in which he stood out more as an actor. In 2007, he had a recurring role in the telenovela Muchachitas como tú. In 2008, he made his debut as a protagonist in the telenovela Juro que te amo where he shared credits with Ana Brenda Contreras. In 2010, he received several recognitions for his stakes in the telenovela Los exitosos Pérez, Locas de amor and Cuando me enamoro.

=== 2011-present: New projects ===
In 2011, Ron returned to star in another telenovela along with Ana Brenda Contreras entitled, La que no podía amar, for which he received the award TVyNovelas Award for Best Young Lead Actor. In 2012, he obtained his first leading role in the telenovela La mujer del Vendaval where he shared credits with Ariadne Díaz and Javier Jattin. In 2014 he starred next to Livia Brito, in the remake of the 1971 Mexican telenovela, Muchacha italiana viene a casarse, which was lengthened to 176 chapters due to its success in Mexico.

In 2015, Ron debuted in cinema in the film A la mala, starring Mauricio Ochmann and Aislinn Derbez. In that same year producer Ignacio Sada gave him the lead role in the telenovela Simplemente María, which is an adaptation of the 1989 telenovela, where he shared credits with Claudia Álvarez and Ferdinando Valencia.

== Filmography ==
=== Films ===
Year	Title	Role	Notes
2015	A la mala	Jerónimo	Film debut

=== Television ===
Year	Title	Role	Notes
2004–2005	Mujer de madera	Adrián	Television debut
2005	Bajo el mismo techo	Eugenio	
2006	Rebelde	Enzo	
2006–2007	Código postal	Patricio González	
2007	Muchachitas como tú	Jorge	
2008–2009	Juro que te amo	José María Aldama	
2009–2010	Los exitosos Pérez	Tomás Arana	TVyNovelas Award for Best Young Lead Actor
2010	Locas de amor	Marcos	
2010–2011	Cuando me enamoro	Matías Monterrubio	Main role
2011–2012	La que no podía amar	Gustavo Durán	Main role
2012–2013	La mujer del Vendaval	Alessandro Casteló	Lead role
2014–2015	Muchacha italiana viene a casarse	Pedro Ángeles	Lead role
2015–2016	Simplemente María	Alejandro Rivapalacio	Lead role
2017	Enamorándome de Ramón	Ramón López	Lead role
2018	Por amar sin ley	Ramón Ortiz	Guest star
2018	Mi lista de exes	Juan Miguel	Episode: "El Chef"
2019	Ringo	Juan José Ramírez "Ringo"	Lead role
2020	Rubí	Alejandro Cárdenas Ruiz	Lead role
2020	Te doy la vida	Pedro Garrido Salazar	Lead role
2021	La desalmada	Rafael Toscano Lagos	Lead role
2022	La mujer del diablo	Cristo Beltrán	Lead role
2023	El gallo de oro	Dionisio Pinzón	Lead role
2024	Papás por conveniencia	Tino	Lead role
TBA	Cruzando destinos: Marruecos en el corazón †	León	Lead role

=== Music videos ===
Year	Artist	Title
2015	Alex Sirvent	"Bajemos la guardia"
2017	Cristian Castro	"Simplemente tú"

== Awards and nominations ==
Year	Award	Category	Nominated	Result	Ref.
2009	27th TVyNovelas Awards	Best Young Lead Actor	Juro Que Te Amo	Nominated	
2010	28th TVyNovelas Awards	Best Young Lead Actor	Los exitosos Pérez	Won	
2012	30th TVyNovelas Awards	Best Co-lead Actor	La que no podía amar	Won	
2012	People en Español Awards	Best Supporting Actor	La que no podía amar	Nominated	
2014	Premios Juventud	What a Hottie!	La mujer del Vendaval	Nominated	
2016	Premios Juventud	My Favorite Protagonist	Muchacha italiana viene a casarse	Nominated	
2020	38th TVyNovelas Awards	Best Actor	Ringo	Won	
