= Alejandra Procuna =

Mexican actress (born 1969)

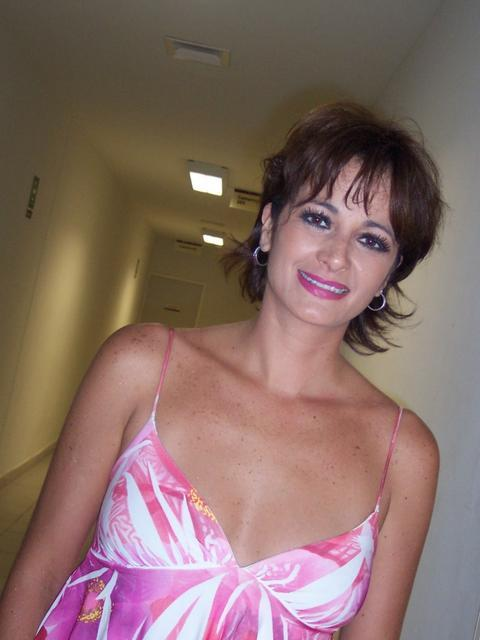
- Born: Alejandra Weinstein Procuna; August 14, 1969 (age 56); Mexico City, Mexico
- Occupation: Actress
- Years active: 1990–present

Alejandra Weinstein Procuna (born August 14, 1969, Mexico City, Mexico), is a Mexican actress. Her parents are Ernesto Weinstein Peña and Amparo Procuna Chamorro and she is the niece of writer Marcia del Río.

== Filmography ==
=== Films ===
Year	Title	Role	Notes
1995	La vibora	Pilar	
2013	Siete años de matrimonio	Tessie	

=== Television roles ===
Year	Title	Role	Notes
1990	Yo compro esa mujer	Georgette	
1990	Cenizas y diamantes	Cynthia	
1993	Las secretas intenciones	Clara Cardenal	
1995	María la del Barrio	Brenda	
1996	Te sigo amando	Elisa	
1996	Marisol	Malú	37 episodes
1997–06	Mujer, casos de la vida real	Various Roles	10 episodes
1998	Vivo por Elena	Ely	
1998	Huracán	Dayanira	
1999	Nunca te olvidaré	Mara Montalbán	
1999	Alma rebelde	Iris	
2000	Siempre te amaré	Olivia	
2000	Carita de ángel	Morelba	
2001	Salomé	Rebeca Santos	
2001	Navidad sin fin	Julieta	2 episodes
2002	¡Vivan los niños!	Diamantina Robles	
2004	Amy, la niña de la mochila azul	Minerva Camargo	
2006	Duelo de pasiones	Mariana Montellano	
2007	XHDRbZ	Ex-Alumna	Episode: "Reunión escolar"
2007	Tormenta en el paraíso	Martha Valdivia	
2009	Mujeres asesinas	Clarissa	Episode: "Soledad, cautiva"
2009	Los simuladores	Amalia Quiroz	Episode: "Workaholic"
2010	Soy tu dueña	Brenda Castaño Lagunes	25 episodes
2011	Una familia con suerte	Lidia	
2011–15	Como dice el dicho	Claudia / Coty	3 episodes
2013–14	Lo que la vida me robó	Dominga	103 episodes
2014	Hasta el fin del mundo	Rosa Valera	Episode: "Un matrimonio forzado"
2015	Que te perdone Dios	Eduviges	63 episodes
2016	Corazón que miente	Elena	49 episodes
2020–21	La mexicana y el güero	Isis de Robles	
2021	Contigo sí	Yolanda Morales	
2023–24	Golpe de suerte	Irma	
2024–25	Amor amargo	Dolores López	
