= Alex Sirvent =

Mexican actor, singer and composer

- Born: Alejandro Mariano Sirvent Bartón; October 18, 1979 (age 46); Mexico City, Mexico
- Occupations: Singer, actor
- Years active: 1992–present
- Spouse: Ximena Herrera (2010-2013)
- Partner: Anahí (2002-2003)

Alejandro Sirvent (born October 18, 1979), also credited as Alex Sirvent, is a Mexican actor, singer and composer.

His first TV series stint was playing the role of Eduardo Arellano Gómez in telenovela Corazones al límite. His filmography includes Bajo el mismo techo, Contra viento y marea, Vibe, Madre Luna and Para Volver a Amar. Some of his songs have gone on to be featured in some telenovelas. His duet with Ximena Herrera, Junto a Ti, was used as a theme song on the telenovela Abismo de Pasión. Another single, Cruzaré Mil Mares, was used as a theme song on Lo que la vida me robó.

== Filmography ==
Film roles
Year	Title	Roles	Notes
2012	El arribo de Conrado Sierra	Lotario	
2013	Siete años de matrimonio	Franco	
2017	Santiago Apóstol	Teodoro	

Television roles
Year	Title	Roles	Notes
2004	Corazones al límite	Eduardo Arellano Gómez	
2004–2006	Mujer, casos de la vida real	Various characters	Recurring role; 8 episodes
2005	Contra viento y marea	Chema	
2005	Bajo el mismo techo	Pablo	Episode: "Cuidado con la primera vez"
2007	Yo amo a Juan Querendón	Héctor	
2007	Madre Luna	Valentín Aguirre	Recurring role; 141 episodes
2008–2009	Un gancho al corazón	Rolando Klunder	Recurring role; 219 episodes
2010–2011	Para volver a amar	Alcides	Recurring role; 142 episodes
2012	Amor bravío	Rafael Quintana	Recurring role; 137 episodes
2013–2016	Sr. Ávila	El Chulo	Recurring role; 3 episodes
2013–2014	Quiero amarte	Marco Antonio / Young Mauro	Recurring role; 56 episodes
2014	Lo que la vida me robó	Erik	Recurring role; 16 episodes
2014–2015	La sombra del pasado	Emanuel	Recurring role; 125 episodes
2018	Por amar sin ley	Arturo	Guest role; 6 episodes
2018	Educando a Nina	Antonio Aguirre	Main role; 106 episodes

== Discography ==
- Lo mejor que me pasó en la vida (2013)

== Children ==
He is the brother of Paty Sirvent who is a former member and leader of the group Jeans.
