= Ximena Herrera =

Bolivian actress (born 1979)

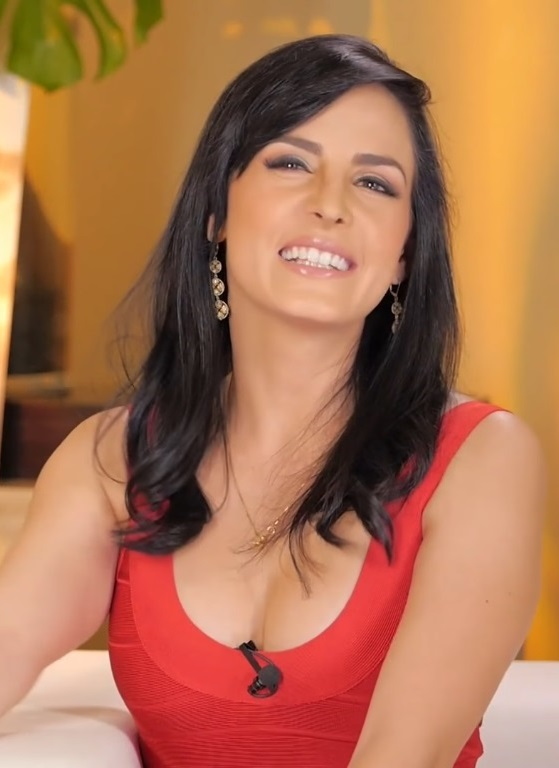
- Born: Carla Ximena Herrera Bowles; October 5, 1979 (age 46); La Paz, Bolivia
- Occupation: Actress
- Years active: 2004–present
- Spouse: Alex Sirvent (2010–2013)

Ximena Herrera (born Carla Ximena Herrera Bowles on October 5, 1979 in La Paz, Bolivia) is a Bolivian actress. She has acted in several telenovelas including La madrastra, El Señor de los Cielos, Mujeres de negro, Buscando a Frida, and Vuelve a mí.

Herrera was married to actor-composer Alex Sirvent, but they divorced in December 2013.

== Filmography ==
Film roles
Year	Title	Roles	Notes
2008	Volverte a ver	Sofía	
2010	El buen amigo	Claudia	Short film
2011	La otra familia	Unknown role	
2013	Siete años de matrimonio	Ana	

Television roles
Year	Title	Roles	Notes
2004	Corazones al límite	Malkah	Recurring role
2005	Mujer, casos de la vida real	Unknown role	Episode: "Mala paga"
2005	La Madrastra	Alma Muñoz / Alma Martínez	Recurring role
2006	Duelo de pasiones	Rosita	Recurring role
2007	Decisiones	Anabel	Episode: "Nadar por la vida"
2007	Bajo las riendas del amor	Maripaz García	Recurring role
2008	Las tontas no van al cielo	Irene	Recurring role
2009	El Pantera	Rosaura Barrio "La Reina"	2 episodes
2010	Niña de mi corazón	María Magdalena Bravo	Recurring role; 87 episodes
2011	Ni contigo ni sin ti	Isabela Rivas Olmedo	Recurring role; 122 episodes
2012	Infames	Dolores "Lola" Medina / Sara Escalante	Main role
2013–2014	El Señor de los Cielos	Ximena Letrán de Casillas	Main role (seasons 1–2); 152 episodes
2014–2015	Hasta el fin del mundo	Araceli	Recurring role; 141 episodes
2016	El hotel de los secretos	Cristina Olmedo	Guest role; 12 episodes
2016	Mujeres de negro	Katia	Main role; 52 episodes
2018	Sin miedo a la verdad	Carlota	Guest role
2019	El Dragón: Return of a Warrior	Paula Sandoval	Guest role
2021	Buscando a Frida	Marcela Bribiesca de Pons	Lead role
2022–2023	Mi camino es amarte	Karen Zambrano	Main role
2023	Vuelve a mí	Amelia San Román	Main role

== Awards and nominations ==
Year	Award	Nominated	Category	Result
2012	TVyNovelas Awards	Ni Contigo Ni Sin Ti	Best Co-star Actress	Nominated
2013	Premios Tu Mundo	El Señor de los Cielos	Favorite Lead Actress	Nominated
2013	Premios Tu Mundo	El Señor de los Cielos	The Perfect Couple (with Rafael Amaya)	Nominated
