= Atrapada =

Atrapada may refer to:

- Atrapada (1991 TV series)
- Atrapada (2018 TV series)
