= Las trampas del deseo =

Mexican telenovela

- Genre: Telenovela
- Created by: Verónica Velasco
- Written by: Alejandra Olvera; Jacques Bonnavent; Diana Cardozo; Zaria Abreu; Magali Urquieta; Reinolds Robledo
- Directed by: Moisés Ortiz Urquidi; Carlos Salces
- Creative director: Ana Celia Urquidi
- Starring: Marimar Vega; Javier Jattin; Alejandra Ambrosi; Lourdes Reyes
- Opening theme: "The Creature From The Blackened Room" by X: THC
- Country of origin: Mexico
- Original language: Spanish
- No. of episodes: 120

Production
- Executive producer: Rocío Barajas
- Producers: Carlos Payán; Verónica Velasco; Epigmenio Ibarra

Original release
- Network: Cadenatres
- Release: October 21, 2013 – April 4, 2014

Las trampas del deseo (English: The Pitfalls of Desire), is a Mexican telenovela produced and distributed by Argos Comunicación and MundoFox broadcast by Cadenatres. Produced by Epigmenio Ibarra, Carlos Payan and Verónica Velasco.

Starring by Marimar Vega and Javier Jattin, while Lourdes Reyes and Alejandra Ambrosi.

== Plot ==
The story shows a social reality immersed in a mix of melodrama and psychological-cop-politic thriller, of which their themes will be treated as they are, no makeup and a dose of truth. The story will be told through 3 women, each one looking to satisfy their most deep desires; Aura has fallen into an existential crisis after her mother's suicide, now looking for going beyond her mother's death, serve justice and committing suicide afterwards, but the only thing that can save her is Dario's love. Marina will look for justice after losing her sister by the hands of a white slave traffic ring and will end up infiltrating in said ring, which their leaders are Silvio and Gema. Lastly, Roberta is capable of anything in order to reach the highest echelons of power, reaching her most desired pleasure, being the first female president of Mexico.

== Cast ==
- Marimar Vega as Aura Luján Velázquez
- Javier Jattin as Darío Alvarado Jáuregui
- Alejandra Ambrosi as Marina Lagos / Emilia Robaina
- Lourdes Reyes as Roberta Jáuregui
- Carlos Torres as Cristóbal Larios / Pablo
- Adriana Parra as Mara
- Alexandra de la Mora as Lucía Salazar de Fuentes
- Juan Ríos as Álvaro Luján
- Bianca Calderón as Patricia de Santana
- Mario Loria as Mario Santana
- Diego Soldano as Silvio Galiano / Federico
- Camila Ibarra as Valeria Santana
- Julia Urbini as Larissa Fuentes Salazar
- Cristina Rodlo as Rubí
- Geraldine Zinat as Gema
- Rodrigo Abed as Gerardo Alvarado
- Aldo Gallardo as Everardo
- Constantino Costas as Fausto
- Paulina Dávila as Andrea / Johanna
- Amara Villafuerte as Reneé / Susana
- Jimena Guerra as Lorena Sarquis
- Alejandro Caso as Daniel Fuentes
- Jorge Almada as Jorge Sarquis
- Irineo Álvarez as Comandante Sergio
- José Astorga as Israel
- Daniela Avendaño as Cecilia
- Héctor Berzunza as Héctor Carvajal
- Jorge Caballero as Matías
- Mar Carrera as Romina
- Luz Ofelia Muñoz Catalán as Luz
- Ángel Cerlo as Senador Hernán Lascuráin
- Maruza Cinta as Galia
- Thanya López as Liliana Velázquez de Luján
- Carlos Athié as Jonás
