= Contigo sí =

Mexican telenovela

- Genre: Telenovela
- Based on: Viviana by Inés Rodena
- Developed by: Antonio Abascal; Carlos Daniel González; Dante Hernández; Sol Rubí Santillana
- Directed by: Juan Carlos Terreros Espinosa; Claudio Elisa Aguilar
- Starring: Alejandra Robles Gil; Danilo Carrera; Brandon Peniche; Ernesto Laguardia; Bárbara Islas; Anette Michel
- Theme music composer: J. Eduardo Murguía P.; Mauricio L. Arriaga; León Leiden; Kenia Os
- Opening theme: "Contigo sí" by Kenia Os & León Leiden
- Composers: Eduardo Murguía P.; Mauricio L. Arriaga; Ricardo Larrea
- Country of origin: Mexico
- Original language: Spanish
- No. of seasons: 1
- No. of episodes: 120

Production
- Executive producer: Ignacio Sada
- Producer: Arturo Pedraza Loera
- Editor: Israel Flores Ordaz
- Production company: TelevisaUnivision

Original release
- Network: Las Estrellas
- Release: 11 October 2021 – 25 March 2022

Contigo sí (English title: You Are the One) is a Mexican telenovela that aired on Las Estrellas from 11 October 2021 to 25 March 2022. The series is produced by Ignacio Sada. It is based on the 1978 Mexican telenovela Viviana created by Inés Rodena. The series stars Alejandra Robles Gil, Danilo Carrera, and Brandon Peniche.

== Plot ==
Ángela (Alejandra Robles Gil) is a nurse and medical student who lives in a town near the sea. She is seduced by Álvaro (Danilo Carrera), an ambitious young man who visits the town on a business trip to build a hospital. Ángela and Álvaro get married but then he abandons her and returns to Mexico City, where he is engaged to Samantha (Bárbara Islas) and marries her as well. Ángela decides to go to Mexico City in search of Álvaro, she discovers the deception and meets Leonardo (Brandon Peniche), a doctor who falls in love with her and becomes her protector. Ángela will tirelessly fight against the adversities of destiny, in the quest to find true love.

== Cast ==
=== Main ===
- Alejandra Robles Gil as Ángela Gutiérrez
  - Lara Campos as Child Ángela
- Danilo Carrera as Álvaro Villalobos Hurtado
- Brandon Peniche as Leonardo Santillana Morán
- Ernesto Laguardia as Gerardo Vega
- Bárbara Islas as Samantha Vega
- Anette Michel as Mirta Morán
- Áxel Ricco as Félix
- Gema Garoa as Alma Yazbek
- Francisco Rubio as Darío
- Tania Lizardo as Luz
- Carina Ricco as Beatriz Guardiola
- Emoé de la Parra as Doña Pura
- Felipe Nájera as Julio Vallejo
- Daniela Zavala as Adela
- Lisardo as Aníbal Treviño
- Alejandra Procuna as Yolanda
- Arlette Pacheco as Fedra
- Rebeca Mankita as Josefina
- Silvia Lomelí as Nancy
- Claudia Ortega as Nélida
- Carlos Speitzer as Abel
- Lalo Palacios as Pablo
- Nacho Ortiz Vera as Óscar
- Miranda Kay as Clarita
- Emilio Palacios as Eddie
- Kenneth Lavíll as Memo
- Manuel Landeta as Sandro Santillana

=== Recurring ===
- Pepe Olivares as Ugarte
- Gregorio Reséndiz as Judge Lorca
- Benjamín Rivero as Baldomero
- Salvador Ibarra as Benjamín
- Rafael Amador as Father Marcos
- Paulina de Labra as Pasiflora
- José Montini as Legaspi
- Esteban Franco as Gabino
- Martín Brek as Fulgencio
- Roberto Tello as El Chamuco
- Carlos Athié as Francisco

=== Guest stars ===
- Pedro Moreno as Josué
- María Prado as Conchita

== Production ==
In June 2021, it was reported that Ignacio Sada was producing a new version of the 1978 telenovela Viviana, with the working title being Volverte a ver. On 12 July 2021, Alejandra Robles Gil, Danilo Carrera, and Brandon Peniche were announced in the lead roles. Filming began on 26 July 2021. On 19 August 2021, it was announced that the official title of the telenovela would be Contigo sí. Filming concluded on 12 February 2022.

== Ratings ==
Season	Timeslot (CT)	Episodes	First aired		Last aired	
Season	Timeslot (CT)	Episodes	Date	Viewers (millions)	Date	Viewers (millions)
1	Mon–Fri 4:30 p.m.	120	11 October 2021	2.4	25 March 2022	2.8

== Episodes ==
No.	Title	Original release date
1	"Álvaro y Ángela se conocen a la orilla del mar"	11 October 2021 (Note: Premiered early online through Las Estrellas website on 8 October 2021.)
Álvaro and Ángela's paths crss when they both try to save a child from drowning. After getting to know her better, Álvaro asks Ángela to marry him.
2	"Ángela y Álvaro se casan"	12 October 2021
Ángela and Álvaro get married in a civil ceremony, but a few days later he abandons her and she suffers from the death of her grandmother Conchita.
3	"Leonardo rescata a Ángela"	13 October 2021
Ángela is mugged upon arriving in Mexico City and Leonardo rushes to her aid. Álvaro finds Ángela and swears they will make up for lost time.
4	"Álvaro y Samantha terminan"	14 October 2021
Álvaro realizes that Samantha does not really love him and decides it is better to end their relationship. Leonardo and Ángela meet and become friends.
5	"¿Te quieres casar conmigo?"	15 October 2021
After Gerardo's juicy offer, Álvaro decides to propose to Samantha. Ángela demands more attention from Álvaro.
6	"Me parto el alma por ti"	18 October 2021
Ángela sleeps over at Leonardo's house, Álvaro finds out and confronts her for not taking him into consideration. Beatriz has lung cancer.
7	"No eres el hombre del que me enamoré"	19 October 2021
Álvaro finds Ángela in the hospital where he works and approaches her, but she ignores him and leaves, vowing that she will make it on her own.
8	"Ese matrimonio fue un error"	20 October 2021
Álvaro travels to Mérida to annul his marriage with Ángela so he can marry Samantha. Ángela takes her exam and Leonardo fears he is falling in love with her. Samantha insists that Álvaro has a mistress.
9	"Félix secuestra a Memo"	21 October 2021
Félix secretly abducts Memo and everyone goes in search of him. Luz has a crisis. Ángela passes her exam. Álvaro takes Samantha to meet Clarita. Mirta threatens Julio.
10	"El mundo es de los audaces"	22 October 2021
Álvaro is determined to separately make both Samantha and Ángela happy. Ángela starts working as a maid. Sandro decides to divorce Mirta.
11	"¡Te casaste con otra mujer!"	25 October 2021
Samantha and Álvaro get married in a church, but Ángela arrives accompanied by Yolanda. Ángela confronts Álvaro about his betrayal. Mirta suffers a serious accident.
12	"Esto es una pesadilla"	26 October 2021
Ángela, with Luz's support, files a complaint against Alvaro for bigamy; Leonardo sees her suffering and consoles her.
13	"La legítima esposa"	27 October 2021
Ángela seeks out the Vega family to demand her rights as Álvaro's wife. Beatriz worsens. Mirta could lose her leg.
14	"No te quiero perder"	28 October 2021
Álvaro confesses to Samantha that the woman in the church was an old girlfriend; she gets angry, but he begs her n the name of their love. Ángela poses for Aníbal.
15	"Va a pagar por esto"	29 October 2021
Gerardo discovers Álvaro's bigamy and demands an explanation. Luz is upset to learn of the Perez y Perez cousins bet.
16	"Orden de aprehensión"	1 November 2021
Álvaro is arrested for the crime of bigamy. Adela flees San Jacinto because she is accused of having killed Gabino. Alma returns to Leonardo's life.
17	"Lo perdiste todo"	2 November 2021
Álvaro assumes his guilt before the judge, Ángela despises him and Samantha swears to take revenge on him. Mirta suffers when she sees that she has lost her leg.
18	"Dos víctimas"	3 November 2021
Álvaro assures Samantha that Ángela used both of them. Gerardo seeks out Ángela to find out her history with Álvaro.
19	"Cadena perpetua"	4 November 2021
Samantha decides to stay married to Álvaro to make him go through hell. Samantha tries to blame Ángela for everything that has happened.
20	"Cuestión de vida o muerte"	5 November 2021
Samantha decides to take several sleeping pills to get Álvaro to stay by her side. Darío takes Ángela to meet Clarita.
21	"Vendí mi alma al diablo"	8 November 2021
Samantha confesses to Óscar that she faked the suicide attempt. Ángela visits Álvaro in jail. Luz is willing to do anything to get Memo back.
22	"Encantador de serpientes"	9 November 2021
Ángela and Samantha finally talk and look to support each other. Ángela unburdens herself to Leonardo and they end up having a passionate kiss. Félix betrays Luz's trust.
23	"Ángela cae en la trampa de Aníbal"	10 November 2021
Pura suffers a diabetic coma. Ángela agrees to go to a private event to settle the debt with Aníbal, but falls into a dangerous trap. Alma tries to get Leonardo back.
24	"No quiero volver a verte"	11 November 2021
Ángela decides to pardon Álvaro so that he is released from jail and able to take care of Clarita. Ángela files a complaint against Aníbal, who asks Mirta for help.
25	"Nada que esconder"	12 November 2021
Álvaro is released. Ángela visits Beatriz and warns her of Samantha's plans. Mirta plans to get rid of Sandro, as she believes her husband is worth more dead than alive. Pura talks to her grandchildren.
26	"Es mi mujer"	15 November 2021
After being released from prison, Álvaro accuses Ángela of wanting to be with Leonardo out of interest. Pura dies, but her family plans to give her a proper send-off.
27	"La otra eres tú"	16 November 2021
Ángela and Samantha have a confrontation over Álvaro, while he and Leonardo come to blows. Memo manages to escape from Félix.
28	"El plan de Alma"	17 November 2021
Ángela's studies pay off and she gets more work, while Alma and Mirta plan to get rid of her. Memo returns to the city and the conciliation hearing between Álvaro and Ángela approaches.
29	"Un ángel en mi vida"	18 November 2021
Mirta gets her way and fires Ángela. Leonardo tries to make Samantha see that Álvaro is not good for her and is only with her out of interest. Luz learns of Memo's disappearance.
30	"Tentación latente"	19 November 2021
Beatriz hires Ángela as a nurse and Álvaro takes advantage by trying to kiss her. Fedra confesses to Sandro that Darío is their son. Luz discovers that Memo is in town.
31	"Enamorada de Leonardo"	22 November 2021
Álvaro tries to win Ángela back, but she tells him that she is with Leonardo. Mirta and Aníbal try to kill Sandro.
32	"Mi papá se murió"	23 November 2021
Leonardo finds Sandro unconscious and tries to help him, but he dies in the hospital. Mirta attempts to humiliate Ángela, but Leonardo presents her as his girlfriend.
33	"Ángela acepta sentir algo por Leonardo"	24 November 2021
Angela admits to falling in love with Leonardo. Leonardo learns that strange substances were found in Sandro's body.
34	"Meterse en la boca del lobo"	25 November 2021
Ángela agrees to work for Beatriz, but when she arrives at the Vega's house, Samantha confronts her.
35	"Hasta aquí llegó tu suerte"	26 November 2021
Ángela sets a trap for Aníbal, but he kidnaps her to avoid being arrested. Leonardo confesses to feeling jealous of Álvaro. Memo returns with Luz.
36	"Un dardo envenenado directo al corazón"	29 November 2021
Ángela is rescued by the police, but suffers from Alma anonymously publishing her photos. Leonardo reports Sandro's murder.
37	"Cada quien debe seguir su camino"	30 November 2021
Ángela decides to end her relationship with Leonardo. Alma uses Ugarte to disparage Ángela. Aníbal and Yolanda are convicted.
38	"De esta no te salvas"	1 December 2021
Ángela is attacked in a hearing provoked by Ugarte. Leonardo asks Ángela for her forgiveness. Gerardo sees the photos of Ángela and Samantha demands that he fire Ángela.
39	"Siempre voy a defenderte"	2 December 2021
Álvaro swears to Ángela that he will not allow anyone to hurt her. The police take possession of Mirta's house. Aníbal is received in prison.
40	"El amor es valentía y constancia"	3 December 2021
Álvaro defends Ángela at the hearing and declares his love for her, but she makes it clear that she loves Leonardo. Luz and Pablo kiss.
41	"Una guerra personal"	6 December 2021
Ángela wins the hearing, but Ugarte threatens her. Mirta offers Ángela a peace offering. Beatriz discovers how little love Samantha has for her.
42	"No concibo la vida sin ti"	7 December 2021
Leonardo confesses to Ángela that he wants her to be his wife. Álvaro swears to Samantha that he loves her. Luz accepts Félix's proposal.
43	"Vine a recuperar tu amor"	8 December 2021
Álvaro surprises Ángela in Real del Mar and says that he loves her. Adela remembers her past when she returns to the home she lived in the past.
44	"¡Es un milagro!"	9 December 2021
Ángela is shocked to see that Adela is alive. Samantha discovers Álvaro's lie. Aníbal is attacked in prison.
45	"Un nuevo comienzo"	10 December 2021
Álvaro gives Samantha a ring to renew their relationship. Clarita wakes up. Beatriz is rushed to the hospital.
46	"Te voy a amar siempre"	13 December 2021
Beatriz dies in Gerardo's arms. Leonardo is arrested for running over Edgardo. Clarita mentions Darío's name.
47	"¿De qué eres capaz por amor?"	14 December 2021
Alma blackmails Ángela to let go of Leonardo. Gerardo faints at Beatriz's funeral. Samantha attacks Ángela.
48	"La vida no nos deja ser felices"	15 December 2021
Ángela asks Leonardo to remember how much she loves him and accepts Alma's plan, who is determined to get him back. Álvaro teases Leonardo.
49	"No me busques"	16 December 2021
Ángela breaks up with Leonardo out of love for Álvaro. Gerardo kicks out Samantha from the house, but she confronts him. Julio looks for Mirta and threatens her.
50	"Ángela está embarazada"	17 December 2021
Ángela faints and finds out that she is pregnant, Leonardo confronts her for using him. Álvaro and Leonardo fight. Samantha threatens Adela.
51	"Un niño fruto de nuestro amor"	20 December 2021
Álvaro finds out that Ángela is pregnant and asks her to start a family. Samantha changes her tactics and pretends to be nice to smooth things over with Gerardo.
52	"Juega tus cartas a largo plazo"	21 December 2021
Samantha threatens Álvaro with taking everything from him if he doesn't prevent his son from being born. Ángela suffers when she loses her scholarship. Alma gets a fake boyfriend to make Leonardo jealous.
53	"Que sean muy felices"	22 December 2021
Ángela asks Álvaro not to marry Samantha, but they both get married in a ceremony to which Ángela attends accompanying Gerardo.
54	"Sacar los trapitos al sol"	23 December 2021
Legaspi finds evidence against Álvaro, but he puts him in check to keep him quiet. Memo undergoes surgery. Ángela sees Alma kissing Leonardo.
55	"Deja que el agua fluya"	24 December 2021
Alma asks Leonardo for a new chance and they kiss. Samantha plans to provoke an abortion to Ángela.
56	"Salva a mi bebé"	27 December 2021
Samantha's plan works and Angela's baby's life is in danger. Luz tries to make Gerardo see the truth about the jewelry theft.
57	"Te vas a tragar tus palabras"	28 December 2021
Ángela and her baby are out of danger. Alma gives Ángela news about her relationship with Leonardo, meanwhile he visits Ángela and questions her feelings for him.
58	"Me voy a olvidar de ti"	29 December 2021
Leonardo discovers that Angela's threatened abortion was no coincidence. Clarita discovers that Darío is Samantha's lover.
59	"Acepto casarme contigo"	30 December 2021
Leonardo resigns himself to not being with Ángela and gets engaged with Alma. Darío confesses to Álvaro that he is Samantha's lover.
60	"Alguien quiso matar a tu bebé"	31 December 2021
Ángela learns of Leonardo's engagement, while he confesses to her that someone tried to kill her baby.
61	"Te va a hacer muy infeliz"	3 January 2022
Ángela begs Leonardo not to marry Alma. Darío confesses his love for Clarita. Álvaro and Leonardo confront Samantha because of what happened to Ángela.
62	"Un juego sucio"	4 January 2022
Alma gives Ángela an invitation to her wedding and Ángela confronts Leonardo for Alma's mockery. The hospital is evacuated due to a gas leak.
63	"Tiene que saber la verdad"	5 January 2022
Ángela decides to tell Leonardo about Alma's blackmail, Alvaro offers his help. Darío discovers Estrellita's illness.
64	"Alma y Leonardo se casan"	6 January 2022
Alma and Leonardo get married. Ángela suffers because she could not prevent the wedding due to Álvaro's fault.
65	"Noche de bodas"	7 January 2022
Alma seduces Leonardo during their honeymoon, but he calls her Ángela. Mirta drugs Gerardo in order to spend the night together.
66	"Una loba disfrazada de oveja"	10 January 2022
Alma insults Ángela after seeing her with Leonardo, but Ángela defends herself. Samantha finds out that she is the majority shareholder of Grupo Vega.
67	"Tu mamá es una asesina"	11 January 2022
Samantha threatens Ángela with sending Adela to jail if they don't leave far away. Álvaro finds Darío kissing Clarita.
68	"Me voy para siempre"	12 January 2022
Ángela decides to go back to Real del Mar with her mom and says goodbye to her loved ones. Clarita escapes from Álvaro and goes to live with Darío.
69	"Vengo a entregarme"	13 January 2022
Adela turns herself in and confesses her love for Gerardo. Ángela confesses Alma's blackmail to Leonardo.
70	"Cuida tus flancos"	14 January 2022
Ángela unmasks Alma in front of Leonardo. Álvaro and Leonardo fight. Samantha will not allow anyone to take away what belongs to her.
71	"Me la tengo que jugar"	17 January 2022
Ángela tells Leonardo of Álvaro's plan to open the clinic. Samantha asks Darío to give her a child. Félix hits Pablo.
72	"Se va a desatar un infierno"	18 January 2022
Samantha fires Ángela from the hospital. Leonardo reveals to Ángela that he is still in love with her.
73	"Ya no puedo estar sin ti"	19 January 2022
Leonardo tells Ángela that he will fight for them to get back together. Darío reports Samantha for harassment. Fernando tries to abuse Ángela.
74	"Esto es la guerra"	20 January 2022
Samantha is betrayed by Álvaro and vows to take revenge on Gerardo. Samantha also denies Darío's accusations and threatens to attack Clarita.
75	"Álvaro es detenido"	21 January 2022
Samantha makes a suggestive proposal to Álvaro, meanwhile he is arrested. Alma is suspicious of the closeness between Leonardo and Angela.
76	"La verdad sobre tu origen"	24 January 2022
Cándida reveals to Clarita that she and Álvaro are her parents. Samantha wants Ángela fired from hospital.
77	"Voy a tener sola a mi bebé"	25 January 2022
Alma finds out that she is pregnant the same day Leonardo asks her for a divorce. Mirta kills Benjamín. Clarita confronts Álvaro for hiding the fact that he is her father.
78	"El bebé está a punto de nacer"	26 January 2022
Leonardo y Gerardo help Ángela after her water breaks. Cándida asks Clara for forgiveness and dies.
79	"Salven a mi bebé"	27 January 2022
Ángela begs Leonardo to take care of her son, who was born with lung problems. Félix shoots Pablo before marrying Luz.
80	"Los animales ponzoñosos no cambian"	28 January 2022
Álvaro swears that he is willing to change for his son, but Samantha mocks him and demands that he make love to her. Ugarte apologizes to Ángela.
81	"Paro respiratorio"	31 January 2022
Angela's son's health worsens and she decides to name him Josué. Mirta charges Julio for pleasure. Samantha threatens Adela.
82	"El precio que hay que pagar"	1 February 2022
Luz tries to kill Félix. Álvaro asks Ángela to go live together in Real del Mar. Ugarte dies in the hospital.
83	"Hacer algo drástico"	2 February 2022
Álvaro asks Samantha for a divorce, but she gets angry, hits him and drugs him to seduce him. Leonardo and Ángela say goodbye with a kiss.
84	"Todo lo hice por ti"	3 February 2022
Leonardo discovers that Julio is his father and confronts Mirta for hiding the secret. Darío refuses to marry Clara. Ángela y Samantha fight.
85	"Declaración de guerra"	4 February 2022
Samantha and Álvaro denounce each other. Alma offers Ángela money to build her clinic. Pablo needs a transplant.
86	"Nos vamos a separar"	7 February 2022
Leonardo learns that Alma faked her depression and confronts her. Félix shoots Ramón. Inspector Alfonso looks for Mirta's letter at the Vega's house.
87	"Ya estás conmigo"	8 February 2022
Angela finally carries her son and confesses to Leonardo that she would like to have a future at his side. Samantha refuses to give in to Álvaro's requests.
88	"Se hizo justicia"	9 February 2022
Samantha and Álvaro have an accident on the road. Adela is released from prison. Mirta and Alma have a plan to finish off Ángela.
89	"Cosechas lo que siembras"	10 February 2022
Samantha and Álvaro end up seriously wounded from the car accident. Ángela and Leonardo make love.
90	"Me convertí en un monstruo"	11 February 2022
Samantha blames Gerardo for her misfortune. Álvaro believes that what happened was a punishment from God. Alma confronts Ángela and Leonardo.
91	"Abandono de familia"	14 February 2022
Alma threatens to report Leonardo if he does not comply as a parent. Samantha kicks Álvaro out of the mansion and he asks Ángela if he can stay at her home.
92	"Mordiste la mano que te dio de comer"	15 February 2022
Gerardo confronts Álvaro about the fraud committed against the hospital and fires him. Abel wakes up. Baldomero blackmails Samantha.
93	"Mi ángel ejecutor"	16 February 2022
Samantha allies with Felix to take down her enemies. Alma tells Ángela that Leonardo is back in her arms.
94	"Pagar con odio"	17 February 2022
Samantha swears to Leonardo that she take revenge on Ángela, he confronts her. Ángela receives donations for her foundation.
95	"La verdad es una medicina amarga"	18 February 2022
Leonardo confronts Mirta about her past and she ends up disowning him. Alma looks for Álvaro to continue hurting Ángela.
96	"Jugar con fuego"	21 February 2022
Álvaro forcibly kisses Ángela a la fuerza, Leonardo sees them and confronts Ángela for her betrayal. Gerardo says goodbye to the consortium and splits his shares.
97	"Tú mataste a mi papá"	22 February 2022
Gerardo dies after an argument with Samantha and she blames Ángela for his death.
98	"Muerto el rey, que viva la reina"	23 February 2022
After Gerardo's death, Samantha appoints herself director of the Vega consortium with the help of the board and wants to remove Leonardo.
99	"Me robaron todo"	24 February 2022
Ángela discovers that her money and receipts for the donation were stolen. Samantha threatens Ángela with sending her to jail.
100	"El corazón no entiende de razones"	25 February 2022
Leonardo confronts Álvaro about kissing Ángela. Abel shoots Félix.
101	"El secuestro de Ángela"	28 February 2022
Álvaro decides to kidnap Ángela to avoid her going to jail. Mirta tells Leonardo that if he doesn't fight for Alma, she will leave him for another man.
102	"Aquí hubo mano negra"	1 March 2022
Leonardo suspects that Álvaro kidnapped Ángela. Meanwhile, Ángela tries to escape but suffers from hypothermia.
103	"Resiste"	2 March 2022
Ángela suffers from hypothermia and Álvaro calls Leonardo to save her. Mirta and Alma intrigue against Ángela to the police.
104	"Eres mi héroe"	3 March 2022
Leonardo saves Ángela's life and she thanks him with all her love. Félix threatens Samantha if she doesn't help him escape the hospital.
105	"Puedo ver"	4 March 2022
Álvaro partially recovers his sight, but asks his lawyer to keep quiet. Angela is arrested.
106	"Hacer una tregua"	7 March 2022
Álvaro and Leonardo decide to make peace for a while for Ángela's sake. Mirta confronts Ángela, while Adela confronts Samantha.
107	"Lecciones de moral"	8 March 2022
Adela confronts Mirta for assaulting Ángela. Alma threatens Leonardo with not letting him see his daughter if he insists on staying with Ángela.
108	"El panorama se ve negro"	9 March 2022
While Ángela faces justice to avoid going to prison, Álvaro seduces Samantha and Leonardo manages to steal from Mirta.
109	"Caiga quien caiga"	10 March 2022
Samantha accuses Mirta of being behind the fraud to the foundation and discovers that Mirta wants to take all her money.
110	"¡No está ciego!"	11 March 2022
Samanta tries to hit Álvaro, but, as he defends himself, she discovers that he can see. Leonardo threatens Mirta.
111	"¿Te quieres casar conmigo?"	14 March 2022
Leonardo proposes marriage to Ángela. Samantha searches for Mirta's letter and Nancy plans to expose them both.
112	"En el amor y la guerra todo se vale"	15 March 2022
Ángela hears Álvaro say that he can see again and confronts him about his betrayal. Mirta is fired from the foundation and confronts Ángela.
113	"Ha ganado la justicia"	16 March 2022
Ángela manages to recover the property that Gerardo inherited her. Mirta is pursued by the police and asks Félix for help to save herself.
114	"Voy a luchar hasta el final"	17 March 2022
Álvaro is not willing to leave Ángela, so he deceives her again. Samantha mistakes Ángela for Mirta and confesses to Sandro's murder.
115	"¡Nos estafaron!"	18 March 2022
Imanol notifies Alma that his son Iñaki has swindled them and taken all their money.
116	"La vida se ensaña con todos"	21 March 2022
Darío advises Ángela to ask for a loan from the hospital and to pledge her shares as collateral. Samantha has Mirta in her hands after she confesses her crimes. Alma running out of money returns to Leonardo's apartment and reveals to him that Iñaki swindled her and begins to feel sick. Álvaro learns that Samantha has had a serious relapse. Leonardo gives the inspector the letter he found from Yolanda and Mirta is arrested. Samantha threatens to hurt Ángela.
117	"¡Se robó a mi bebé!"	22 March 2022
Alma's health is in critical condition. Félix arrives in the neighborhood to take Ángela's son. Ángela contacts Leonardo to let him know what happened to her baby. Alma assures Leonardo that if anything happens to her it will be his fault. Samantha reveals to her lawyer where Ángela's baby is being held and he is willing to confess the truth in exchange for not involving him.
118	"Se le declaró en coma"	23 March 2022
Álvaro asks Samantha not to mess with his son. Ángela struggles with Félix to rescue her baby and they both have an accident. Inspector García seeks evidence to imprison Félix. Abel and Pablo manage to find Félix's accomplice. Alma asks Samantha that if something happens to her, she should not allow her daughter to stay in Ángela's care. Leonardo does not give Adela good news about Ángela's health. Alma comments to Leonardo that she doesn't want her baby to know about the mistakes she made. Samantha tries to run away to avoid being arrested. Leonardo asks Ángela to fight for her life because he needs her.
119	"Ángela perdió la memoria"	24 March 2022
Leonardo learns that Alma died after complications. Samantha manages to escape from the police. Ángela loses her memory. Adela asks Álvaro to help Ángela remember her present. Álvaro plans to take Ángela and her son from the hospital, but Samantha sets her revenge plan in motion. Gerardo surprises Samantha in jail.
120	"Trabajar por nuestro sueño"	25 March 2022
Gerardo confesses to Samantha that he faked his death just to teach her a lesson in life, Samantha comes to her senses and asks him to forgive her for all the mistakes she made. Felix is received by his accomplices in jail. Álvaro visits Samantha in jail to ask her forgiveness for the harm he did. Álvaro says goodbye to Ángela with a letter and leaves her a donation for the foundation, some time later, he is ready to rebuild his life with a millionaire woman. After opening her clinic in Real del Mar, Ángela and Leonardo get married.
