= Jessica Coch =

Mexican actress

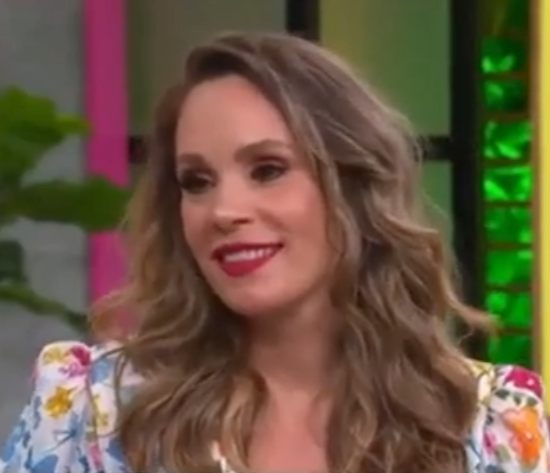
- In a 2024 interview
- Born: Jessica Alejandra Coch Montes de Oca; 4 November 1979 (age 46); Puebla, Mexico
- Other names: Jessy
- Occupation: Actress
- Years active: 2006–present
- Spouse: Roberto Gómez Fernández (m. 2010; div. 2011)
- Parent(s): Jorge Coch; Martha Montes de Oca

Jessica Coch (born Jessica Alejandra Coch Montes de Oca on 4 November 1979) is a Mexican actress.

== Biography ==
Coch was born on 4 November 1979, in the city of Puebla, Mexico. She is the daughter of an Argentine professional soccer player Jorge Coch and a Mexican mother, Martha Montes de Oca. Jessica started studying at the Centro de Educación Artística (CEA) of Televisa in the 1996 generation at only 16 years of age.

In 2006, she dated José Ron, while they worked together in Código Postal. In May 2010 she married the producer Roberto Gómez Fernández, son of the comedian Roberto Gómez Bolaños. They divorced in September 2011.

== Career ==
She received her first opportunities with small roles in the telenovelas Alborada and Rebelde. In 2006 she attended a casting for the juvenile telenovela Código Postal of the producer José Alberto Castro getting the antagonistic role of Johanna Villarreal, a seductive, clever and envious character where she shared credits with Africa Zavala.

For 2007, Coch started working again with José Alberto Castro with the character of María Inés Castrejón in the telenovela Palabra de Mujer.

In 2008 Ma Pat invited her to participate as Cristina in the telenovela Juro Que Te Amo where she worked again alongside José Ron. Later in 2009 she is called by the producer Juan Osorio to work in Mi Pecado as Renata, the villain. With this character she established herself as one of the stronger young actresses of the moment.

In 2010 she was alongside Silvia Navarro and Juan Soler in the telenovela Cuando me enamoro, which is a remake of the telenovela La Mentira.

In late October 2011, Jessica was confirmed by the producer Ignacio Sada Madero to star alongside Zuria Vega and Gabriel Soto in the soap opera Un Refugio para el Amor, a remake of the soap opera Morelia, where she played the main antagonist of the telenovela, the same role that was interpreted by former Miss Universe Cecilia Bolocco in the previous production. She had a special appearance in the series Muchacha italiana viene a casarse. Coch was the antagonist in Amor de barrio. She stars in the series Mi marido tiene familia as the co-protagonist.

== Filmography ==
Television
| Year | Title | Role | Notes |
|---|---|---|---|
| 2006-07 | Código Postal | Juana "Joanna" Villarreal | |
| 2007-08 | Palabra de Mujer | María Inés Castrejón | |
| 2008-09 | Juro Que Te Amo | Cristina de Urbina | |
| 2009 | S.O.S.: Sexo y otros Secretos | | |
| 2009 | Mi pecado | Renata Valencia | |
| 2010-11 | Cuando Me Enamoro | Roberta Monterrubio Álvarez/Roberta Gamba Álvarez | |
| 2011 | Malpaís | María Carranza | |
| 2012 | Un Refugio para el Amor | Gala Villavicencio de Torreslanda | Main cast |
| 2014-15 | Muchacha italiana viene a casarse | Tania Casanova | Guest star |
| 2015 | Amor de barrio | Tamara/Mona Lisa Altamirano | |
| 2017 | Mi marido tiene familia | Marisol Córcega | Main cast |
| 2023 | Los 50 | Herself | Contestant |
| 2024 | El Conde: Amor y honor | Leticia de Gallardo | |

== Theater ==
- PQLHAALC
- Chicas católicas...
- Tu Tampoco Eres Normal

== Awards and nominations ==
=== Premios TVyNovelas ===
| Year | Category | Telenovela | Result |
|---|---|---|---|
| 2011 | Best Co-star Actress | Cuando Me Enamoro | Nominated |
| 2016 | Best Supporting Actress | Amor de barrio | Nominated |
