= List of Simplemente María episodes =

Simplemente María (English: Simply María) is a Mexican telenovela produced by Ignacio Sada for Televisa. Based on an original story by the Argentine writer Celia Alcántara. It is a remake of the Mexican telenovela Simplemente María, produced in 1989. The series stars Claudia Álvarez as María, José Ron as Alejandro and Ferdinando Valencia as Cristóbal. The series originally aired from November 9, 2015, to May 1, 2016.

== Episodes ==
| No. overall | No. in season | Title | Original release date |
|---|---|---|---|
First stage
| 1 | 1 | "¡María se va a la ciudad!" | November 9, 2015 |
| 2 | 2 | "¡Alejandro queda flechado!" | November 10, 2015 |
| 3 | 3 | "¡María se entrega a Alejandro!" | November 11, 2015 |
| 4 | 4 | "¿María embarazada?" | November 12, 2015 |
| 5 | 5 | "¡Alejandro le rompe el corazón a María!" | November 13, 2015 |
| 6 | 6 | "¡El corazón roto de María!" | November 16, 2015 |
| 7 | 7 | "¡Alejandro arrepentido!" | November 17, 2015 |
| 8 | 8 | "¡Los malvados planes de Vanessa!" | November 18, 2015 |
| 9 | 9 | "¡María verá a su bebé!" | November 19, 2015 |
| 10 | 10 | "¡Alejandro tratará de seguir adelante!" | November 20, 2015 |
| 11 | 11 | "¡María da a luz!" | November 23, 2015 |
| 12 | 12 | "¡María se defiende de su patrón!" | November 24, 2015 |
| 13 | 13 | "¡Alejandro se entera que su hijo ya nació!" | November 25, 2015 |
| 14 | 14 | "¡María encuentra su meta en la vida!" | November 26, 2015 |
| 15 | 15 | "¡Vanessa conoce al bebé de María!" | November 27, 2015 |
| 16 | 16 | "¡Georgina aboga por María!" | November 30, 2015 |
| 17 | 17 | "¡María defiende a su bebé!" | December 1, 2015 |
| 18 | 18 | "¡Cristóbal muestra su amor por María!" | December 2, 2015 |
| 19 | 19 | "¡María y Alejandro se reencuentran!" | December 3, 2015 |
| 20 | 20 | "¡Pina pone en su lugar a Yolanda!" | December 4, 2015 |
| 21 | 21 | "¡Alejandro y Karina se vuelven novios!" | December 7, 2015 |
| 22 | 22 | "¡María y Pina pelean!" | December 8, 2015 |
| 23 | 23 | "¡El bautizo de Juan Pablo!" | December 9, 2015 |
| 24 | 24 | "¡Atropellan a María!" | December 10, 2015 |
| 25 | 25 | "¡Cristóbal corre a Alejandro del hospital!" | December 11, 2015 |
| 26 | 26 | "¡María descubre que Cristóbal la ama!" | December 14, 2015 |
| 27 | 27 | "¡Alejandro y María pelean por Juan Pablo!" | December 15, 2015 |
| 28 | 28 | "¡Alejandro y Cristóbal a un paso de los golpes!" | December 16, 2015 |
| 29 | 29 | "¡Georgina descubre que tiene un nieto!" | December 17, 2015 |
| 30 | 30 | "¡Karina amenaza a Vanessa!" | December 18, 2015 |
| 31 | 31 | "Georgina morirá" | December 21, 2015 |
| 32 | 32 | "El secreto de Vanessa" | December 22, 2015 |
| 33 | 33 | "¡Alejandro le propone matrimonio a María!" | December 23, 2015 |
| 34 | 34 | "Adolfo no apoya la relación de Alejandro" | December 24, 2015 |
| 35 | 35 | "¡Marco descubre a Didier!" | December 25, 2015 |
| 36 | 36 | "¡Vanessa se sale con la suya!" | December 28, 2015 |
| 37 | 37 | "¡Cristóbal acusado!" | December 29, 2015 |
| 38 | 38 | "¡Alejandro le salva la vida a Diana!" | December 30, 2015 |
| 39 | 39 | "¡Cristóbal descubre la mentira!" | December 31, 2015 |
| 40 | 40 | "¡Alejandro deja a María!" | January 1, 2016 |
| 41 | 41 | "¡Vanessa traidora!" | January 4, 2016 |
| 42 | 42 | "¡María y Alejandro juntos de nuevo!" | January 5, 2016 |
| 43 | 43 | "¡Karina ataca a María!" | January 6, 2016 |
| 44 | 44 | "¡Vanessa y Marco se casan!" | January 7, 2016 |
| 45 | 45 | "¡La boda de Vanessa!" | January 8, 2016 |
| 46 | 46 | "¡Alejandro descubierto!" | January 11, 2016 |
| 47 | 47 | "¡Plan para atrapar a Cristóbal!" | January 12, 2016 |
| 48 | 48 | "¡Don Juan rechaza a María!" | January 13, 2016 |
| 49 | 49 | "¡María entre la espada y la pared!" | January 14, 2016 |
| 50 | 50 | "¡Alejandro le propone matrimonio a María!" | January 15, 2016 |
| 51 | 51 | "¡La ilusión de Diana!" | January 18, 2016 |
| 52 | 52 | "¡María se quiere casar!" | January 19, 2016 |
| 53 | 53 | "¡Qué poco vale tu amor, Alejandro!" | January 20, 2016 |
| 54 | 54 | "¡Alejandro y Cristóbal se enfrentan de nuevo!" | January 21, 2016 |
| 55 | 55 | "¡Alejandro se casa por despecho!" | January 22, 2016 |
| 56 | 56 | "¡Cristóbal le declara su amor a María!" | January 25, 2016 |
| 57 | 57 | "¡Se arruina la boda de Diana!" | January 26, 2016 |
| 58 | 58 | "¡Diana se encontrará con María!" | January 27, 2016 |
| 59 | 59 | "¡María confronta a Diana!" | January 28, 2016 |
| 60 | 60 | "¡La maldad de Karina no tiene límites!" | January 29, 2016 |
| 61 | 61 | "¡Alejandro busca consuelo en María!" | February 1, 2016 |
| 62 | 62 | "¡María se reecuentra con viejas rivales!" | February 2, 2016 |
| 63 | 63 | "¡Adolfo ahora sí quiere a María!" | February 3, 2016 |
| 64 | 64 | "¡Cristóbal estalla en furia!" | February 4, 2016 |
| 65 | 65 | "¡Cristóbal le propone matrimonio a María!" | February 5, 2016 |
| 66 | 66 | "¡El corazón de María vuelve a latir!" | February 8, 2016 |
| 67 | 67 | "¡Alejandro se lleva a Juan Pablo!" | February 9, 2016 |
| 68 | 68 | "¡Se rompe el compromiso!" | February 10, 2016 |
Second stage
| 69 | 69 | "¡Un nuevo comienzo!" | February 11, 2016 |
| 70 | 70 | "¡Nace un nuevo amor!" | February 12, 2016 |
| 71 | 71 | "¡Juan Pablo y Lucía se vuelven novios!" | February 15, 2016 |
| 72 | 72 | "¡De nuevo la propuesta!" | February 16, 2016 |
| 73 | 73 | "¡El corazón roto de Juan Pablo!" | February 17, 2016 |
| 74 | 74 | "¡Se descubre la mentira de Sonia!" | February 18, 2016 |
| 75 | 75 | "¡Confesión de amor!" | December 10, 2015 |
| 76 | 76 | "¡María rechaza a Alejandro!" | February 22, 2016 |
| 77 | 77 | "¡Fausto confiesa sus sentimientos!" | February 23, 2016 |
| 78 | 78 | "¡No renunciaré de nuevo al amor!" | February 24, 2016 |
| 79 | 79 | "¡Sonia siembra la duda!" | February 25, 2016 |
| 80 | 80 | "¡El poder de las mentiras!" | February 26, 2016 |
| 81 | 81 | "¡María cae en las mentiras!" | February 29, 2016 |
| 82 | 82 | "¡María cierra su corazón!" | March 1, 2016 |
| 83 | 83 | "¡Alejandro aleja a Vanessa de su vida!" | March 2, 2016 |
| 84 | 84 | "¡Se disuelve el amor!" | March 3, 2016 |
| 85 | 85 | "¡Lucía se entrega a Juan Pablo!" | March 4, 2016 |
| 86 | 86 | "¡Iván abusa de Lucía!" | March 7, 2016 |
| 87 | 87 | "¡Alejandro y Don Juan se conocen!" | March 8, 2016 |
| 88 | 88 | "¡Vanessa mata a Don Juan!" | March 9, 2016 |
| 89 | 89 | "¡Juan Pablo odia a los Rivapalacio!" | March 10, 2016 |
| 90 | 90 | "¡Lucía está embarazada!" | March 11, 2016 |
| 91 | 91 | "¡Descubren el embarazo de Lucía!" | March 14, 2016 |
| 92 | 92 | "¡La verdadera madre de Vanessa!" | March 15, 2016 |
| 93 | 93 | "¡Lucía escapa sin dejar rastro!" | March 16, 2016 |
| 94 | 94 | "¡Cristóbal se da una nueva oportunidad!" | March 17, 2016 |
| 95 | 95 | "¡María encuentra a Lucía!" | March 18, 2016 |
| 96 | 96 | "¡Vannessa no es una Rivapalacio!" | March 21, 2016 |
| 97 | 97 | "¡La boda de Lucía y Juan Pablo!" | March 22, 2016 |
| 98 | 98 | "¡Vanessa descubre la verdad!" | March 23, 2016 |
| 99 | 99 | "¡Lucía muere!" | March 24, 2016 |
| 100 | 100 | "¡Vanessa se vuelve loca!" | March 25, 2016 |
| 101 | 101 | "¿Vanessa miente?" | March 28, 2016 |
| 102 | 102 | "¡Un nuevo amor para María!" | March 29, 2016 |
| 103 | 103 | "¡Cristóbal se casará de nuevo!" | March 30, 2016 |
| 104 | 104 | "¡A María se le rompe el corazón!" | March 31, 2016 |
| 105 | 105 | "¡Alejandro derrotado!" | April 1, 2016 |
| 106 | 106 | "¡Vanessa encuentra a la bebé!" | April 4, 2016 |
| 107 | 107 | "¡Por fin la felicidad!" | April 5, 2016 |
| 108 | 108 | "¡Juan Pablo le dispara a Vanessa!" | April 6, 2016 |
| 109 | 109 | "¡Todos tras Diego!" | April 7, 2016 |
| 110 | 110 | "¡Diego trata de escapar!" | April 8, 2016 |
| 111 | 111 | "¡Sus intenciones no son buenas!" | April 11, 2016 |
| 112 | 112 | "¡María cayó en la trampa!" | April 12, 2016 |
| 113 | 113 | "¡Cristóbal quiere el divorcio!" | April 13, 2016 |
| 114 | 114 | "¡Vanessa mata a su padre!" | April 14, 2016 |
| 115 | 115 | "¡Historias de amor!" | April 15, 2016 |
| 116 | 116 | "¡Ponen a Claudia en su lugar!" | April 18, 2016 |
| 117 | 117 | "¡Momentos de decisión!" | April 19, 2016 |
| 118 | 118 | "¡María esta embarazada!" | April 20, 2016 |
| 119 | 119 | "¡Secuestran a María!" | April 21, 2016 |
| 120 | 120 | "¡Tras la pista de María!" | April 22, 2016 |
| 121 | 121 | "¡La hija de María!" | April 25, 2016 |
| 122 | 122 | "¡Comienza una nueva vida!" | April 26, 2016 |
| 123 | 123 | "¡Alejandro encuentra a María!" | April 27, 2016 |
| 124 | 124 | "¡María nunca recuperará la memoria!" | April 28, 2016 |
| 125 | 125 | "¡Adiós, María!" | April 29, 2016 |
| 126 | 126 | TBA | May 1, 2016 |
