= Un refugio para el amor =

Mexican telenovela

- Genre: Telenovela; Romance; Drama
- Created by: Delia Fiallo
- Written by: Georgina Tinoco; Nora Alemán
- Directed by: Ana Lorena Pérez-Ríos; Eduardo Said
- Starring: Zuria Vega; Gabriel Soto; Laura Flores; Roberto Blandón; Zaide Silvia Gutiérrez; Jessica Coch
- Theme music composer: Jorge Eduardo Murguía Pedraza; Mauricio Lopez de Arriaga
- Opening theme: "Amor Sincero" by Alexander Acha and Zuria Vega
- Country of origin: Mexico
- Original language: Spanish
- No. of episodes: 165

Production
- Executive producer: Ignacio Sada
- Producer: J. Antonio Arvizu
- Production locations: Real de Catorce, San Luis Potosí; Barranca del Cobre; Mexico City; Tlayacapan, Morelos; Miami
- Cinematography: Gabriel Vázquez Bulman
- Editors: Víctor Hugo Flores; Israel Flores
- Camera setup: Multi-camera
- Running time: 41–45 minutes
- Production company: Televisa

Original release
- Network: Canal de las Estrellas
- Release: February 6 – September 23, 2012

Related
- La zulianita (1977); Morelia (1995)

Un refugio para el amor (English title: A Shelter For Love) is a Mexican telenovela produced by Ignacio Sada for Televisa. It aired on Canal de las Estrellas from February 6, 2012 to September 23, 2012 It is a remake of the Venezuelan telenovela La zulianita and the Mexican telenovela Morelia.

Zuria Vega and Gabriel Soto star as the main protagonists, while Laura Flores, Jessica Coch, Humberto Elizondo and Frances Ondiviela star as the main antagonists.

In the United States, Univision aired Un refugio para el amor from May 24, 2012 to November 30, 2012.

== Plot ==
Luciana is a beautiful and joyful young girl who, after her father’s death, escapes from the sexual harassment of Don Aquiles, the tyrant in the town where she grew up, and arrives in Mexico City. In order to survive, she has to take a job in “El Inferno”, a bar with a very bad reputation. One night, one of the customers tries to go too far with her, but she defends herself and scratches him on the face; a commotion is started and they end up in the police station. Luciana is accused of hurting a customer and when everything seems lost for her, Claudio, her attorney, rescues her. She sympathizes with him immediately and he offers her his unconditional help.

After this event, Luciana gets a job as a maid in the Torreslanda home, where she helps to take care of Patricio, one of their kids who suffered an accident and became quadriplegic. She immediately gets along with him and Jana, his sister; Patricio recovers his desire to live thanks to Luciana and she becomes his best friend and confidant.

There, she meets Rodrigo, the oldest son of the family, and she is impressed when she realizes that he is the same young guy that defended her during the commotion at the bar. Rodrigo is a handsome guy who holds a reputation as a lady-killer, but he is currently engaged with Gala, a beautiful and rich girl who is also a successful executive. A strong attraction grows between Rodrigo and Luciana, which little by little becomes a deep love; Rodrigo decides to end his engagement with Gala to secretly marry Luciana.

When Gala and Roselena, Rodrigo’s mother, find this out, they make a plan to separate them. They tell Rodrigo that the girl has manipulated him looking forward to taking his money and that she has escaped from her town because of a money debt she still has not paid, which made her family lose their poor home; moreover, they tell him that when she arrived in the city, she worked as a “table dancer” at a bar where there is still a formal complaint against her by one of her clients. Madly upset, Rodrigo confronts Luciana, who tries to defend herself, but everything accuses her. Rodrigo, blinded by jealousy, does not listen to her and he throws her out of his home and his life forever.

Devastated, Luciana looks for consolation in Claudio, who shortly after discovers he is Luciana’s biological father. When they discover this, both of them promise to make the Torreslanda family pay for all the pain they have caused them; Claudio spent many years in jail accused of a fraud that was in fact committed by Maximino, Rodrigo’s father, which stripped him of all his goods.

Later, Luciana realizes she is pregnant and she decides not to tell Rodrigo and have her baby on her own. Rodrigo, on the other hand, marries Gala and lives in hell because she makes his life miserable.

Luciana gives birth to Rodrigo Jr. during a risky labor, which almost kills her. Roselena learns that Luciana is having a child and plans to kidnap him; to stop her, Luciana escapes from the hospital but she faints in the way and loses the baby. A homeless musician takes the baby believing she is dead; when Luciana wakes up and does not see her baby, the pain drives her crazy and she spends her life looking for him.

Some years later, Rodrigo meets a boy who works in the street and they become friends, but he doesn't know that the kid he befriended is his biological son. On the other hand, his situation with Gala gets even worse and they decide to get divorced. He runs into Luciana one day and he apologizes to her, but she assures him with a cold look that she despises him now exactly with the same passion she once loved him. Rodrigo promises Luciana to find Rodrigo Jr....but only time will define the direction their destinies will take, which by now will remain united by the hope to find their son and be able to live together with him in.... “A Shelter for Love”.

== Cast ==
=== Main ===
Actor	Character
Zuria Vega	Luciana Jacinto Flores / Luciana Linares Talancón
Gabriel Soto	Rodrigo Torreslanda Fuentes-Gil
Laura Flores	Rosa Elena Fuentes-Gil de Torreslanda
Roberto Blandón	Maximino Torreslanda
Zaide Silvia Gutiérrez	Paz Flores Vda. de Jacinto
Jessica Coch	Gala Villavicencio Williams

=== Recurring ===
Actor	Character
Frances Ondiviela	Julieta "Julie" Williams Vda. de Villavicencio
Luz María Jerez	Constanza "Conny" Fuentes-Gil Vda. de San Emeterio
Humberto Elizondo	Aquiles Trueba Tajonar
Aleida Núñez	Violeta Ramos / Coral
Brandon Peniche	Patricio "Pato" Torreslanda Fuentes-Gil
José Carlos Ruiz	Galdino Jacinto
Angelina Pelaez	Sabina
Socorro Bonilla	Magdalena "Magda" Ramos
David Ostrosky	Claudio Linares
Claudio Báez	Lastra
Salvador Sánchez	Don Chelo
Lupita Lara	Chuy
Harry Geithner	Óscar Gaitán
Maricruz Nájera	Matilde
Oscar Bonfiglio	Padre Honesto
Yula Pozo	Estela
Salvador Ibarra	Marcos
Jaime Lozano	Lic. Barrera
José Antonio Ferral	Jerónimo
Roberto Miquel	Iván
Ilean Almaguer	Hannah Torreslanda Fuentes-Gil
Paul Stanley	Aldo San Emeterio Fuentes-Gil
Tania Lizardo	Melissa San Emeterio Fuentes-Gil
Erik Diaz	Lorenzo Jacinto Flores
Sachi Tamashiro	Vicky
Eduardo Cuervo	Polo
Lucero Lander	Dr. Hauser
Mauricio Mejía	Mirko
Fernando Robles	Pedro
Francisco Rubio	Fabián
Pepe Olivares	Procopio
Kelchie Arizmendi	Norma
Rafael del Villar	Marcial
Gabriel de Cervantes	Jorge
Sugchey Abrego	Serena
Úrsula Montserrat	Ofelia
Ricardo Vera	Dr. Diez
Raúl Padilla "Chóforo"	Don Serapio
Lucía Guilmáin	Brígida
Fernanda Sasse	Alexia Torreslanda Villavicencio
Federico “Fede” Porras Jr.	Mateo / Rodrigo Torreslanda Linares

=== Special participation ===
Actor	Character
Nora Salinas	Aurora Talancón de Linares

== Production ==
Production of Un Refugio para el Amor officially started on November 22, 2011.

== Reception ==
Though Canal de las Estrellas broadcast Un Refugio para el Amor in the afternoon, it became the most successful telenovela in the afternoon time slot, having more viewership than its predecessors Esperanza del corazón and Rafaela.

== Awards and nominations ==
Year	Association	Category	Nominated	Result
2012	Premios People en Español	Best New Talent of the Year	Zuria Vega	Won
2012	Premios People en Español	Best Supporting Actress	Laura Flores	Nominated
2012	Premios People en Español	Best Supporting Actor	Harry Geithner	Nominated
2013	31st TVyNovelas Awards	Best Actress	Zuria Vega	Nominated
2013	31st TVyNovelas Awards	Best Actor	Gabriel Soto	Nominated
2013	31st TVyNovelas Awards	Best Co-lead Actor	Brandon Peniche	Nominated
2013	31st TVyNovelas Awards	Best Female Revelation	Tania Lizardo	Nominated
2013	31st TVyNovelas Awards	Best Male Revelation	Erik Díaz	Nominated
2013	Los Favoritos del público	Favorite couple	Zuria Vega and Gabriel Soto	Won
2013	Los Favoritos del público	Favorite Villain	Laura Flores	Nominated
2013	Los Favoritos del público	The Most Handsome Guy	Gabriel Soto	Nominated
2013	Los Favoritos del público	Favorite Kiss	Zuria Vega and Gabriel Soto	Won
