= Tania Lizardo =

Mexican actress (born 1988)

- Born: October 10, 1989 (age 37); León, Guanajuato, México
- Other name: Thania Lizardo
- Education: Centro de Educación Artística
- Occupation: Actress
- Years active: 2009–present

Tania Lizardo (born October 10, 1989) is a Mexican actress best known for her work in television.

== Biography ==
Born in León, Guanajuato, Tania Lizardo decided to pursue a career in acting at age 18. She dropped out of Universidad La Salle where she had been studying architecture, and moved to Mexico City where she graduated from the Centro de Educación Artística (CEA). She made her television debut in the "María, pescadera" chapter of the TV series Mujeres asesinas in 2009. In 2011, producer José Alberto Castro, whom she had met while studying at CEA, gave her a role on the telenovela La que no podía amar. She has gone on to appear in other telenovelas such as Ni contigo ni sin ti, Un refugio para el amor, Por siempre mi amor, and Lo imperdonable.

In 2012, Lizardo made her feature film debut in the romantic comedy Viaje de generación.

== Filmography ==
=== Television ===
- La rosa de Guadalupe (2008–2014)
- Mujeres asesinas (2009) – "María, pescadora"
- Difícil Decisión (2011) – Claudia
- Como dice el dicho (2011–2016)
- Ni contigo ni sin ti (2011)
- La que no podía amar (2011–2012) – María Paz "Maripaz" Hernández
- Un refugio para el amor (2012) – Melissa San Emeterio Fuentes-Gil
- Nueva vida (2013)
- Por siempre mi amor (2013–2014) – Marianela
- En Medio De La Lluvia (2014) – Yolita
- Lo imperdonable (2015) – Blanca "Blanquita" Arroyo Álvarez
- Simplemente María (2016) – Magdalena Flores Ríos
- El vuelo de la Victoria (2017) – Usumacinta "Cinta"
- La doble vida de Estela Carrillo (2017) – Ernestina "Nina" Tinoco
- Rubí (2020) - Cristina Pérez Ochoa
- La mexicana y el güero (2020-2021) - Zulema Gutiérrez
- Contigo sí (2021-2022) - Luz
- Pacto de sangre (2023) - Julieta

=== Films ===
- Viaje de generación (2012)

== Awards and recognition ==
Event	Category	Work	Result
2013 TVyNovelas Awards	Best Female Revelation	Un refugio para el amor	Nominated
