= África Zavala =

Mexican actress (born 1985)

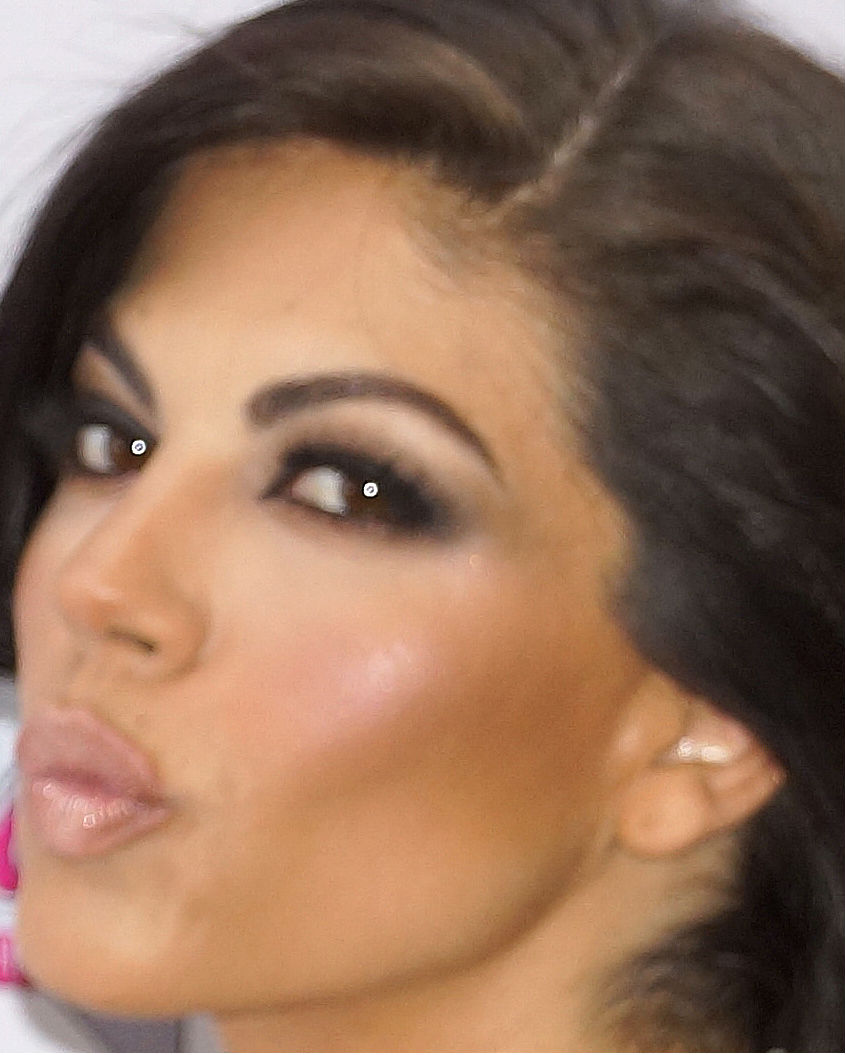
- Born: África Ivonne Zavala; 12 August 1985 (age 41); Mexico City, Mexico
- Other name: Africa Zavala
- Occupation: Actress
- Years active: 2005–present

África Ivonne Lechuga Zavala (Spanish pronunciation: [ˈafɾika saˈβala]; born 12 August 1985 in Mexico City) is a Mexican actress.

== Biography ==
=== 2000s ===
Graduated from the CEA of Televisa, she began her career at age 21 starring in the telenovela Peregrina next to Eduardo Capetillo.

Later in 2006, she starred in the telenovela Código postal alongside José Ron and Jessica Coch. In 2008 she obtained a starring role in the telenovela Cuidado con el ángel as Elsa Maldonado San Román, cousin of the protagonist of the telenovela, sharing credits with Maite Perroni.

In 2009, she received another starring role and traveled to Argentina to record the telenovela Los Exitosos Pérez alongside Ludwika Paleta and Jaime Camil.

=== 2010s ===
In 2010 she was selected to be one of the six protagonists in the telenovela Para Volver a amar beside Rebecca Jones, Nailea Norvind, Alejandra Barros, Sophie Alexander and Zaide Silvia Gutiérrez. In 2011 she starred in the telenovela Amorcito Corazón next to Elizabeth Álvarez, Diego Olivera and Daniel Arenas.

In July 2012 the producer José Alberto Castro confirmed that África Zavala would be the star of his telenovela Corona de lágrimas next to Victoria Ruffo.

In 2014 she starred in José Alberto Castro's La malquerida alongside Victoria Ruffo, Ariadne Díaz and Alberto Estrella.

In 2015 she starred in the telenovela Amores con trampa alongside Itatí Cantoral, Eduardo Yáñez and Ernesto Laguardia.

== Filmography ==
Film
Year	Telenovela	Role	Notes
2013	No sé si cortarme las venas o dejármelas largas	Camila	Film

Television
Year	Telenovela	Role	Notes
2005-06	Peregrina	Peregrina Huerta/Peregrina Alcocer/Marisela Alcocer Morales	Main role
2006-07	Mundo de Fieras	Aurora Cruz (Young)	Guest star
2006-07	Codigo postal	Victoria Villarreal	Main role
2008-09	Cuidado con el ángel	Elsa Maldonado San Román	Supporting role
2009-10	Los Exitosos Perez	Liliana "Lily" Cortéz	Supporting role
2010-11	Para Volver a Amar	Yorley Quiroga	Main role
2011-12	Amorcito Corazón	Lucía Lobo Carvajal de Pinzón	Main cast
2012	Abismo de pasión	Remedios González	Guest role
2012-22	Corona de lágrimas	Lucero Vásquez	Main cast
2014	La malquerida	Ana Alejandra Silva Gonzalez/Turquesa	Main cast
2014	La Gata	Leticia Martínez Negrete de la Santa Cruz (alternate ending)	Guest role
2015	Amores con trampa	María Sánchez Zamarripa de Carmona	Main role
2017	La doble vida de Estela Carrillo	Morgana	Main cast
2018	La jefa del campeón	Renata "Tita" Menchaca	Main role
2018	Atrapada	Mariana	Main role
2021	Vencer el pasado	Fabiola Mascaró Zermeño	Main cast
2023–2024	El Señor de los Cielos	Mercedes "Mecha" de la Cruz	Main cast (season 8)
2024	Papás por conveniencia	Federica	Main cast
2025	Monteverde	Carolina / Celeste	Main role
TBA	Cruzando destinos: Marruecos en el corazón †	Yasmine	Main role

== Awards and nominations ==
=== TVyNovelas Awards ===
Year	Category	Telenovela	Result
2013	Best Co-star Actress	Corona de lágrimas	Nominated
2015	Best Co-star Actress	La Malquerida	Nominated
2018	Best Antagonist Actress	La Doble Vida De Estella Carillo	Nominated
