= Michelle Ramaglia =

Mexican actress

- Born: Claudia Michelle Ramaglia Zavala; May 18, 1978 (age 48); Mexico City, Distrito Federal, Mexico
- Occupation: Actress
- Years active: 2000-present

Michelle Ramaglia (Spanish pronunciation: [miˈtʃel raˈmaɣlja]; born Claudia Michelle Ramaglia Zavala on May 18, 1978, in Mexico City, Distrito Federal, Mexico) is a Mexican actress.

Raised in San Miguel de Allende, Guanajuato and having been interested in acting since her childhood, Michelle Ramaglia decided to enroll in Televisa's Centro de Educación Artística (CEA), where thanks to her talent, she first received small roles in various episodes of Mujer, casos de la vida real. She became well known in 2004, with her participation in the telenovela Mujer de Madera, produced by Emilio Larrosa, where she played Virginia "Vicky" Galván. Ramaglia's most recent work was in Código Postal, Al Diablo con los Guapos with "Corazon Salvaje" and La que no podia amar.

== Soap operas ==
- Simplemente María (2015–16) .... Crispina Jaramillo "Pina"
- La Malquerida (2014) .... Nuria Vásquez (villain)
- Corazón indomable (2013) ... Aracely
- La que no podía amar (2011-12) .... Consuelo Herrera
- Rafaela (2011) - Felipa (villain)
- Cuando me enamoro (2010-11) -Priscila
- Corazón salvaje (2009-10) - Lulú
- Al diablo con los guapos (2007-2008) .... Adelina "Lina"
- Código postal (2006-2007) .... Daniela Gutiérrez Santos
- Mujer, casos de la vida real (2003-2005)
- Mujer de madera (2004-2005) .... Vicky Galván "Perla"
- Amarte es mi pecado (2004) .... Azafata
- Velo de novia (2003) .... Enfermera
- Mi destino eres tú (2000) .... Invitada en boda
