= Cruzando destinos: Marruecos en el corazón =

- Genre: Telenovela
- Based on: Muchacha italiana viene a casarse by Delia González Marquez
- Starring: África Zavala; José Ron
- Country of origin: Mexico
- Original language: Spanish

Production
- Executive producer: Rosy Ocampo
- Camera setup: Multi-camera
- Production company: TelevisaUnivision

Original release
- Network: Las Estrellas

Cruzando destinos: Marruecos en el corazón is an upcoming Mexican telenovela produced by Rosy Ocampo for TelevisaUnivision. It is based on the 1971 Mexican telenovela Muchacha italiana viene a casarse created by Delia González Marquez. The series stars África Zavala and José Ron. It is set to premiere on Las Estrellas on 18 January 2027.

== Cast ==
- África Zavala as Yasmine
- José Ron as León
- Claudia Álvarez as Almudena
- Daniela Romo as Valeria
- Luis Roberto Guzmán as Camilo
- Chantal Andere as Elena
- Mark Tacher as Yussef
- Arcelia Ramírez as Tere
- Alberto Estrella as Brahim
- Luis Gatica as Chendo
- Michel Duval as Eduardo
- Pedro de Tavira as Nabil
- Aarón Mercury as Humberto
- Tania Nicole as Amina
- Jesusa Ochoa as Ana Pau
- Lucca de la Torre as Daniel
- Alexis Ayala as Germán
- Alejandra García as Ángeles
- Abril Vela as Juliana
- Ana Belena as Giana
- Angélica María as Ornela Donatti

== Production ==
On 1 April 2026, Rosy Ocampo announced that pre-production on her next telenovela had begun. On 29 April 2026, África Zavala and José Ron were announced in the lead roles, with the rest of the cast being confirmed as well. Filming of the telenovela began on 25 May 2026. On 16 June 2026, Ariadne Díaz joined the cast in a guest role; however, she dropped the role due to scheduling conflicts and was replaced by Ana Belena. On 3 July 2026, Angélica María joined the cast in a guest role, marking her return to telenovelas after a 14-year absence. From 1 to 15 August 2025, filming occurred in Morocco. On 14 September 2026, Cruzando destinos: Marruecos en el corazón was announced as the title of the telenovela. Filming of the telenovela concluded on 9 October 2026.
