= La malquerida =

2014 Mexican telenovela

- Genre: Telenovela
- Created by: Ximena Suárez
- Based on: The Unloved Woman by Jacinto Benavente
- Screenplay by: Janely Lee; Alejandra Diaz
- Story by: Jacinto Benavente
- Directed by: Salvador Garcini; Juan Carlos Muñoz
- Creative director: Sandra Cortés
- Starring: Victoria Ruffo; Ariadne Díaz; Christian Meier; África Zavala; Arturo Peniche
- Theme music composer: Pablo Preciado; Román Torres Cuevas; Alejandro Pérez González
- Opening theme: "La malquerida" by Cristian Castro, Jesús Navarro and Melissa Robles
- Country of origin: Mexico
- Original language: Spanish
- No. of episodes: 116

Production
- Executive producer: José Alberto Castro
- Producers: Ernesto Hernández; Fausto Sáinz
- Production location: San Miguel de Allende, Guanajuato
- Cinematography: Óscar Morales; Bernardo Nájera
- Editors: Héctor Flores; Juan Ordóñez
- Camera setup: Multi-camera
- Running time: 45 minutes
- Production company: Televisa

Original release
- Network: Canal de las Estrellas
- Release: June 2 – November 9, 2014

Related
- Quiero amarte; La sombra del pasado

La malquerida (The Unloved Woman) is a Mexican telenovela created for Televisa by Ximena Suárez and produced by José Alberto Castro, based on the 1913 Spanish play titled The Unloved Woman by Jacinto Benavente. The series originally aired on Canal de las Estrellas from June 2, 2014 to November 9, 2014. It stars Victoria Ruffo, Ariadne Díaz, Christian Meier, África Zavala, and Arturo Peniche introduced in the telenovela in the second part of the history.

The series follows the life of Cristina (Victoria Ruffo) and her daughter, Acacia (Ariadne Díaz). When Cristina became a widow, she married Esteban (Christian Meier), who is rejected by her daughter, unaware that in reality they have awakened a deep love that both hide behind their mask of hostility. The worst comes when Esteban begins to get rid of all the men who surround Acacia.

The telenovela has three alternative endings, due to the criticisms and comments that were generated after the relationship between the characters of Christian Meier and Ariadne Díaz.

== Plot ==
Acacia (Ariadne Díaz) loses her father Alonso (Marcelo Córdoba) in an accident while he was riding a horse. Cristina (Victoria Ruffo), her mother and his wife, suddenly being widowed, learns that her husband had mortgaged the hacienda in order to cover the expenses of the sowings and livestock, not finding a solution to this, she decides to sell the hacienda and leave to live with her parents together with her daughter. The estate of her husband was rescued by Esteban, a worker of the hacienda, before being sold. After so much effort on the part of Cristina and Esteban (Christian Meier), they manage to raise the hacienda Benavente again and both begin to feel a "great sentimental attraction," Acacia, who was barely a girl, could not understand the love they had, overcome with the recent loss of her father and full of hatred does everything possible to leave the hacienda, while Juan Carlos (Ignacio López Tarso) and Elena (Silvia Mariscal), Cristina's parents, convince Cristina so that Acacia goes to live with them, while she manages to overcome the death of her father and to be able to accept the relationship of her mother with Esteban.

Ten years pass, but the hatred and resentment of Acacia towards Esteban have not changed, returning to the hacienda as a beautiful Woman, the first one to see her is Esteban who does not recognize her after a long time. Acacia is defiant and makes it clear that she is the owner of the Benavente farm. However, between the two begins to emerge a hidden love, which drives Esteban mad who begins to drive away any man who approaches Acacia, turning her into 'La Malquerida'. However, this is not the only subject that the novel deals with, it also talks about other issues such as prostitution, to which Alejandra (África Zavala) had to be submitted for many years; and the different problems that can be generated within a family by the lack of communication, as is the case of Norberto (Guillermo García Cantú) and Juliana (Nora Salinas).

=== Final chapter ===
Acacia (Ariadne Díaz) and Cristina (Victoria Ruffo) have a deep and tense talk, more than mother to daughter, they speak of woman to woman. Cristina tells her that she will not be able to forgive her, and Acacia informs her that she will leave the country not to disturb her. Esteban (Christian Meier) is intensely wanted by the police, he is the main suspect by the death of Manuel (Brandon Peniche). Prisoner of madness, returns to the Benavente with the purpose of taking with himself to Acacia. There, in front of Acacia and Cristina, threatens them with a gun and confesses that he killed Manuel with machetes, and not only that, he was to blame for the death of Alonso (Marcelo Córdoba), the first husband of Cristina and father of Acacia. Mother and daughter suffer from anger and impotence to finally know the truth. They arrive then; Norberto (Guillermo García Cantú), Héctor (Arturo Peniche) and Ulises (Mane de la Parra); the first to settle accounts with Esteban, because he is already aware that he took the life of his son, and the other two with the news that the police are on the way. Everything hurries, and Acacia is shot. The family prays because it works out well, while Esteban is caught.

Acacia reappears at the wedding of Alejandra (África Zavala), her best friend, and Germán (Osvaldo de León); that despite the difficulties and malice of Danilo (Alberto Estrella) can be happy.

In prison, Danilo is burned alive by his cellmates; while Braulio "El Rubio" (Fabián Robles) makes a final visit to Esteban, taking him a photograph of Acacia, and telling him that this adulterous love finally destroyed him. Esteban cries tightening the photo of his beloved. Finally, Cristina forgives Acacia; who in turn is given a chance with Ulises, the true love of her life. Hector leaves a plane ticket to Cristina in case she wants to follow him to Italy. Mother and daughter embrace and walk forward, avoiding the past in which they were, each in its own way, "La Malquerida".

== Cast ==
- Victoria Ruffo as Cristina Maldonado Reyes de Domínguez
- Ariadne Díaz as Acacia Domínguez Maldonado
- Christian Meier as Esteban Domínguez Parra
- África Zavala as Ana Alejandra Silva González / Turquesa
- Arturo Peniche as Héctor Robledo
- Guillermo García Cantú as Norberto Palacios Rincón
- Alberto Estrella as Danilo Vargas
- Nora Salinas as Juliana Salmerón de Palacios
- Sabine Moussier as Edelmira Pérez López / Perla
- Mane de la Parra as Ulises Torres Gallardo
- Ignacio López Tarso as Juan Carlos Maldonado
- Raquel Olmedo as Rosa Molina
- Silvia Mariscal as Elena Reyes de Maldonado
- Fabián Robles as Braulio "El Rubio" Jimenéz
- Osvaldo de León as Germán Palacios Salmerón
- Brandon Peniche as Manuel "Manolo" Palacios Salmerón
- Toño Mauri as Andrés Vivanco
- Lupita Jones as Carmen Gallardo Torres
- Michelle Ramaglia as Nuria Vázquez
- Gimena Gómez as Luisa Valero
- Gonzalo Peña as Arturo Torres Gallardo
- Joshua Gutiérrez as Guillermo "Memo" Gonzáles
- Marcelo Córdoba as Alonso Rivas
- Maritza Olivares as Olga
- Andrea Guerrero as Lizi

== Awards and nominations ==
Year	Association	Category	Nominated	Result
2015	33rd TVyNovelas Awards	Best Lead Actress	Ariadne Diaz	Nominated
2015	33rd TVyNovelas Awards	Best Male Antagonist	Alberto Estrella	Nominated
2015	33rd TVyNovelas Awards	Best Young Lead Actor	Brandon Peniche	Nominated
2015	33rd TVyNovelas Awards	Best Co-star Actress	Africa Zavala	Nominated
2015	33rd TVyNovelas Awards	Best Supporting Actor	Fabian Robles	Nominated
