= Simplemente María (2015 TV series) =

- Genre: Telenovela
- Created by: Gabriela Ortigoza
- Based on: Simplemente María by Celia Alcántara
- Written by: Nora Aleman; Alejandro Orive; Ricardo Tejeda; Pilar Pedroza
- Directed by: Eduardo Said; Sandra Schiffner
- Starring: Claudia Álvarez; José Ron; Ferdinando Valencia; Arleth Terán; Ana Martin; Eleazar Gómez; Alejandra Robles Gil
- Theme music composer: Eduardo Murguía; Mauricio Arriaga
- Opening theme: "Simplemente tú" performed by Cristian Castro
- Country of origin: Mexico
- Original language: Spanish
- No. of episodes: 126 (list of episodes)

Production
- Executive producer: Ignacio Sada
- Producer: J. Antonio Arvizu V.
- Editors: Víctor Hugo Flores Ordaz; Israel Flores Ordaz
- Camera setup: Multi-camera
- Running time: 42-45 minutes
- Production company: Televisa

Original release
- Network: Canal de las Estrellas
- Release: November 9, 2015 – May 1, 2016

Related
- Amor de barrio; Simplemente María (1989)

Simplemente María (English: Simply María) is a Mexican telenovela produced by Ignacio Sada for Televisa. Based on an original story by the Argentine writer Celia Alcántara. It is a remake of the Mexican telenovela Simplemente María, produced in 1989. The series originally aired from November 9, 2015 to May 1, 2016.

The series stars Claudia Álvarez as María, José Ron as Alejandro and Ferdinando Valencia as Cristóbal.

== Plot ==
María, is a young, beautiful yet naïve woman. Maria fled her beloved hometown after being harassed by Isauro, a man that she does not want to be with. Upon arriving in Mexico City, Maria dazzles Alejandro Rivapalacio with her beauty; and the handsome medical student, heir and successor of the medical empire his family owns, sets out to conquer her at all cost.

María falls in love with Alejandro and becomes pregnant. Maria is excited and happy that she will have a baby and marry the man she loves. However, her hopes and dreams are dashed when she becomes aware that Alejandro is not willing to marry her. María resolves to move forward alone with her son, who will be her reason and motive to survive and conquer all obstacles in her way in order to become a high end fashion designer.

Twenty years go by and Cristóbal confesses his feelings to María but she no longer believes in love. Despite Maria's rejection Cristóbal decides to give María time to heal her wounds in the hopes he can convince her of his love. Alejandro returns to Maria's life and a love triangle ensues between them. Love rivals make every attempt to destroy Maria's chances at love and through all the adversity, tribulations and obstacles, Maria fights to reach her dreams of success and maybe even find true love.

== Cast ==
=== Main ===
- Claudia Álvarez as María Flores Ríos
- José Ron as Alejandro Rivapalacio Landa
- Ferdinando Valencia as Cristóbal Cervantes Núñez
- Arleth Terán as Vanessa Rivapalacio Landa de Arenti
- Ana Martín as Felicitas Núñez Vda. de Cervantes "Doña Feli"
- Eleazar Gómez as Juan Pablo Flores Ríos / Juan Pablo Rivapalacio Flores
- Alejandra Robles Gil as Lucía Arenti Rivapalacio

=== Secondary ===
- Michelle Ramaglia as Crispina Jaramillo de Calleja "Pina"
- Francisco Rubio as Marco Arenti Serrano
- Carmen Becerra as Karina Pineda Hurtado
- Claudia Troyo as Estela Lozano
- Beatriz Moreno as Hortensia Miranda
- Carlos Bonavides as Inocencio Buenrostro Falcón
- Norma Herrera as Carmina
- Héctor Sáez as Zacarias Sánchez Mena
- Miguel Martínez as Fabián Garza Treviño
- Daniela Basso as Yolanda Bustos de Garza
- Erik Díaz as Fausto Garza Treviño
- Mónica Sánchez Navarro as Georgina Landa Mendizábal de Rivapalacio
- Silvia Manríquez as Marcela Arriaga
- Fernando Robles as Don Juan Flores
- Ricardo Barona as Luis
- Óscar Ferreti as Profesor Jiménez
- Josué Arévalo as Isauro Correa
- Benjamín Islas as Director
- Humberto Elizondo as Adolfo Rivapalacio Balaguer
- Ricardo Franco as Laureano Calleija
- Cinthia Aparicio as Coral Moreno Sánchez
- Roberto Romano as Gustavo "Tavo" Cervantes Núñez
- Jessica Diaz as Nayeli Cervantes Núñez
- Norma Lazareno as Olivia Aparicio Vda. de Bazaine
- Tania Lizardo as Magdalena Flores Ríos
- Vanessa Terkes as Sonia Aspíllaga
- Claudia Ortega as Belén Sánchez
- Jonnathan Kuri as Conrado Ricalde
- Carlos Athié as Ulises Mérida
- Lore Graniewicz as Claudia Lascuráin
- Estefanía Romero as Dolores Serna
- Eduardo Shacklett as Eugenio Galindo
- Hugo Aceves as Tomás Flores Ríos
- Juan Pablo Rocha as Raúl
- Rebeca Gucón as Paloma Montesinos
- Pietro Vannucci as Dr. Horacio De La Fuente
- Marychuy Aramburo as Zoé Garza Bustos
- Julio Vallado as Iván Sarabia
- Javier Ruán as Heriberto Rojas
- Arsenio Campos as Eugenio Ceniceros
- Eva Cedeño as Bertha de Mérida
- Elena Carrasco as Piedad
- Rebeca Mankita as Úrsula Lobato
- Ewout Rischen as Didier
- Virginia Marín as Enriqueta "Queta"
- Rocío Lázaro as Norma
- Sergio Acosta as "El Zopilote"
- Marina Marín as Madre Superiora
- Amparo Garrido as Madre Benigna

=== Recurring ===
- Marcelo Córdoba as Rodrigo Aranda
- Mariluz Bermúdez as Diana Bazaine Aparicio
- Roberto Blandón as Enrique Montesinos Villarnau
- Maricruz Nájera as Conchita
- Diana Golden as Thelma Lobato
- Lilia Aragón as Constanza Villarnau Vda. de Montesinos
- Óscar Bonfiglio as Lic. Castillo
- Patricio de la Garza as Martín
- Ana Paula Martínez as Lucía
- Fede Porras as Juan Pablo
- Miranda Kay as Nayeli
- Carlos Meza as Gustavo
- Shaula Satinka as Coral
- Omar Yubelli as Gustavo
- Salma Ponce de León as Coral
- Sahit Sosa as Diego Flores Ríos

=== Guest stars ===
- Zaide Silvia Gutiérrez as Zenaida Jaramillo
- Zuria Vega as Virginia Guerrero de Rivapalacio

== Production ==
=== Casting ===
The casting for the role of María began in June 2015 and participated actresses as Thelma Madrigal, Adriana Louvier, Claudia Álvarez, Danna García and Ariadne Díaz, the latter rejected the role because she had other plans. On July 9, 2015, producer Ignacio Sada confirmed that Claudia Álvarez will be the protagonist of the melodrama. The telenovela production began at the end of August 2015 and is expected to be released in November 2015.

Among the actors who made tests to be the protagonist of the novela are Andrés Palacios and Gabriel Soto. On August 7, 2015, it was confirmed that José Ron will be the protagonist of the story, together with Ferdinando Valencia as the co-protagonist.

== Reception ==
The series was released with a total of 13.5 of rating in its first chapter, it is the second telenovela of the Canal de las Estrellas less view for 2015.

== Awards and nominations ==
| Year | Award | Category | Nominated | Result |
|---|---|---|---|---|
| 2017 | 35th TVyNovelas Awards | Best Actress | Claudia Álvarez | Nominated |
| 2017 | 35th TVyNovelas Awards | Best Co-lead Actor | Ferdinando Valencia | Nominated |

== International broadcasting ==
- Vietnam - The series premiered on March 18, 2017, on VTV1 as Đơn giản tôi là Maria.
