= Ilean Almaguer =

Mexican actress (born 1984)

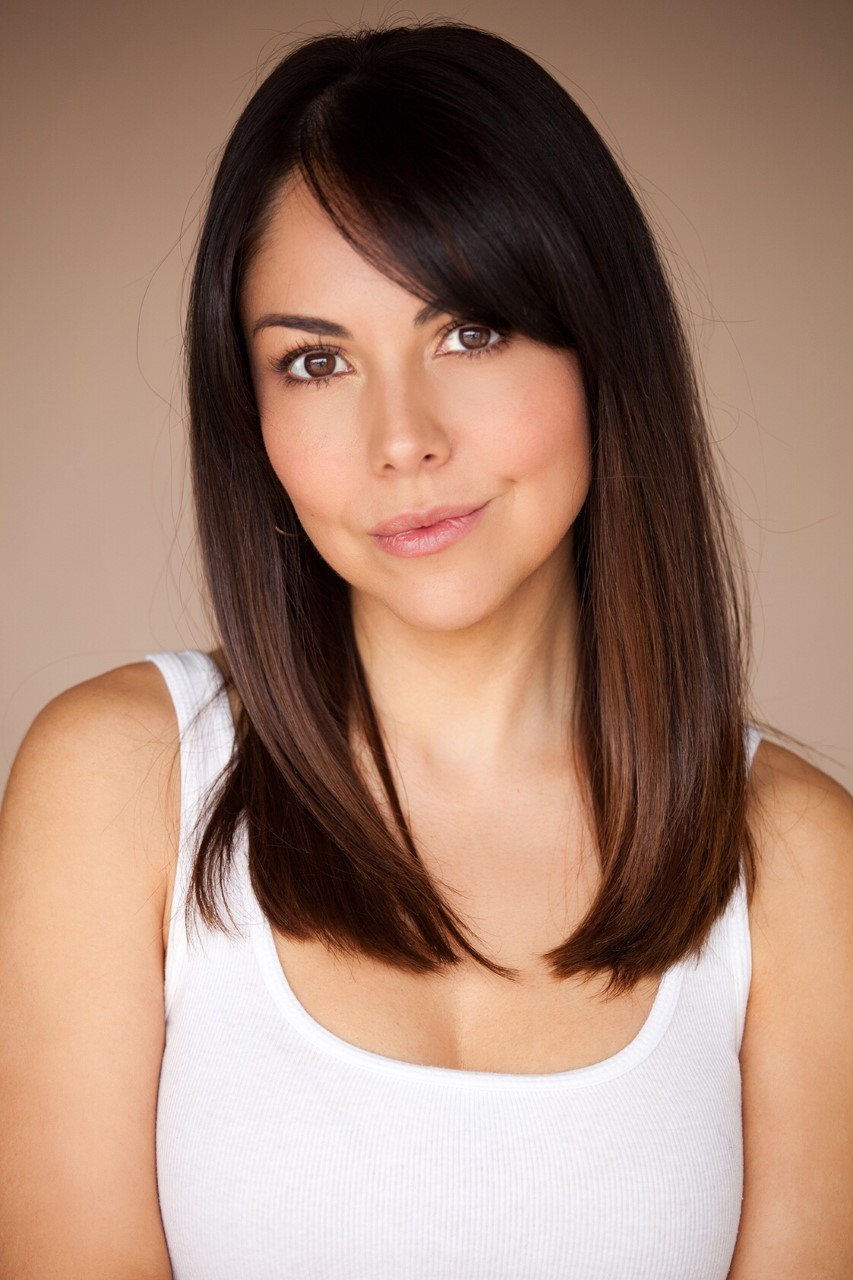
- Ilean Almaguer in 2024
- Born: Ilean Almaguer Ochoa; December 20, 1984 (age 40); Tuxtla Gutiérrez, Chiapas, Mexico
- Occupation: Actress
- Years active: 1997-present
- Spouse: Lucas Velásquez (2013-present)

Ilean Almaguer ((Spanish pronunciation: [iˈlean almaˈɣeɾ]) Born Ilean Almaguer Ochoa on December 20, 1984, in Tuxtla Gutiérrez, Chiapas, Mexico) is a Mexican actress.

== Biography ==
She is best known for her role in the Mexican soap opera "Atrévete a Soñar" playing Catalina (Cata) part of the Populares group. She has also starred in "La Rosa de Guadalupe" series. She is also a cast member of the novela Rafaela as Alicia De La Vega. She has starred in shows such as "Mujer, Casos de la Vida Real" She also appeared in "Rafaela" and "Gitanas".

Also is currently filming "El Quinto Mandamiento". She also played Hannah "Jana" in Un refugio para el amor in 2012. In 2013 she married Colombian actor Lucas Velásquez.

== Filmography ==
Year	Title	Role	Notes
1997	Madame le consul	Margarita	
2001	In the Time of the Butterflies	María Teresa 'Mate' Mirabal	1 Episode
2004	Gitanas	Camila	Supporting Role
2006	Cuentos de Pelos		6 Episodes: "Oncetv, once niños"
2006	Marina	Patricia "Patty" Alarcón Hernandez	Young Protagonist
2006	Los pajarracos	Blanquita	
2007	Quince años		Film
2007	13 Miedos	Rocío	
2007	Mujeres X	Leona Vicario	
2008	La rosa de Guadalupe		2 Episodes
2009	Decisiones de mujeres		2 Episodes
2009	Chabely hot news	Liliana	
2009	El quinto mandamiento	Gabriela	
2009-10	Atrévete a soñar	Catalina "Cata" Novoa	Supporting Role
2010	Ellas son la alegría del hogar	Valentina	
2011	Rafaela	Alicia de la Vega Echaverría	Supporting Role
2012	Un Refugio para el Amor	Hannah "Jana" Torreslanda Fuentes-Gil	Supporting Role
2014	Como dice el dicho	Cristina	
