= Arturo Carmona =

Mexican actor and footballer (born 1976)

- Born: 9 July 1976 (age 49); Monterrey, Nuevo León, Mexico
- Other name: El perro
- Occupations: Former footballer, actor
- Years active: 2002–present

Arturo Aram Carmona Rodriguez (born 9 July 1976) is a Mexican actor and former footballer.

== Biography ==
Carmona was born on 9 July 1976, in Monterrey, Nuevo León, Mexico. He is son of Arturo Carmona and Guadalupe Rodriguez. He has two siblings Judith and Daniel. He started his career as a footballer, but later he graduated to a sports program, his first steps in acting, were in some plays, and as a driver started in a magazine program called Club 34. Debuted in the telenovela Duelo de Pasiones. Next played in La verdad oculta as Mauricio Rivera. In 2006 hosted the program ¡Qué noche! and Hoy a morning television program. He participated in telenovelas Destilando Amor and Muchachitas como tú. In 2008 starred for the first time as a main antagonist in Cuidado con el ángel with Maite Perroni, William Levy and Helena Rojo. Next participated in telenovelas Mar de amor as co-protagonist, Triunfo del amor, Rafaela, Por ella soy Eva, Corona de lágrimas and La tempestad.

He has a daughter with Mexican singer Alicia Villarreal named Melenie Carmona Villarreal.

== Filmography ==
Television, Telenovelas, Films
Year	Title	Role	Notes
2002	Big Brother VIP 4	Himself/Contestant	Reality show, finished 11th
2006	Duelo de Pasiones		Guest star
2006	La verdad oculta	Mauricio Rivera	Supporting role
2006	¡Qué noche!	Himself/host	TV show
2006/08	Ugly Betty	Alejandro	uncredited
2006/08	Hoy	Himself/host	TV show
2007	Destilando Amor	Alfredo Loyola	Recurring role
2007	Muchachitas como tú	Diego Velásquez	Supporting role
2008/09	Cuidado con el ángel	Amador Robles	Main cast
2009	Mar de amor	Santos Nieves	Main cast
2010/11	Triunfo del amor	Gonzalo	Guest star
2011	Rafaela	Víctor Acuña	Supporting role
2012	Por ella soy Eva	Mario Lizárraga	Recurring role
2012/13	Corona de lágrimas	Apolinar "Polo" Pantoja	Supporting role
2013	La tempestad	José Manriquez	Supporting role
2013	Nueva vida	Esteban	TV series
2013	Las armas del alba	Pablo Gómez	Film
2015/16	La vecina	Fidel Chávez	Supporting role
2016	Un camino hacia el destino	Diego Martínez	Guest star
2016	El alien y yo	Guardia	Film
2017	Blue Demon	Ala Dorada	TV series
2017	Enamorándome de Ramón	Antonio Fernández Rivas	Supporting role
2019	Ringo	Alejo Correa	Supporting role
2020	Te doy la vida	Comandante Robles	Supporting role
2021	S.O.S me estoy enamorando	Teniente Pedro	Guest star
2022	Los ricos también lloran	Pedro Villarreal	Guest star
2023	La casa de los famosos	Himself/Contestant	Season 3
2024	Fugitivas, en busca de la libertad	Nicolás Arteaga	
