= Jery Sandoval =

Colombian actress and singer

- Born: Jery Luz Sandoval Sanabria; 18 December 1986 (age 39); Barranquilla, Colombia
- Other name: Jery
- Occupations: Singer, songwriter, actress and model
- Years active: 2000–present
- Label: Universal Music Latin
- Style: Pop, R&B, Europop

Jery Luz Sandoval Sanabria (born 18 December 1986) is a Colombian actress, singer, songwriter and model.

== Early life ==
Jery Sandoval was born in Barranquilla, Colombia and from a very early age lived at Carmen de Bolivar. There she studied at a Catholic school. Her artistic ability was demonstrated at 12 years of age; it was natural since her family had always supported her interest in singing and music. Sandoval began singing in her school's tuna (student orchestra). When she was 12, she became part of a group called "Notas y Colores," at Carmen de Bolivar, which sang ballads and afroantilian music. In addition, with her cousin Luis they formed another group, which won first place in a singing contest in Sincelejo. Between 14 and 16, Jery traveled constantly between Barranquilla and Bogotá. She knew people in the music business who asked her to record her first CD. She wrote several songs, among them "Te Amo", "Cómo Dejarte" and "Mi Primer Día sin Ti". In 2001, thanks to Iván Corredor Julio Navarra's agency, Sandoval participated in "Miss Miércoles", winning second position. Later, she got into television working in the local channel Telebarranquilla in a program called Entre la Rubia y la Morena.

== In television ==
On her 16th birthday, after having finished secondary school, Sandoval and her mother went to the Colombian capital to pursue her dream of being a singer. One day she met Iván Ramirez in a recording studio, who asked to represent her. She accepted, and just a short time later he sent her to be cast in the protagonist role in the series Al Ritmo de tu Corazón. When the producers of RCN TV saw her in the series, they proposed casting her for a role in Los Reyes. For this casting Sandoval tried several roles, and finally landed the role of "Maria". Sandoval prepared with Rubén di Pietro, and a month later the telenovela's production started. Los Reyes became a hit in Colombia reaching a 43.6% rating (comparable level to Betty la Fea). Its shooting schedule, however, became long and debilitating (at two episodes a day) causing several actors to leave, among them Sandoval who, aside from the hours dedicated to the soap opera (7:00 to 22:00 either the more) had to be studying English until 4:00.

In March 2006, Sandoval traveled to Mexico to audition for the Televisa series Código Postal, and became the first Colombian actress to star in Mexican television next to Verónica Castro. She was given the role of "Regina Corona". The series ran until October 2006. After several years in the 2025, she participated in the reality show la casa de los famosos Colombia.

=== MTV Popland ===
Jery Sandoval was on a soap opera called Popland produced by MTV Networks Latin America, written by Marcelo Camacho and Claudia Bono. Her character is Nicole, who is a model.

== Singing career ==
In February 2007, she went to Puerto Rico to begin musical production with White Lion Records, her producer being Elías de Léon, and has traveled between Puerto Rico and Bogotá. Since the beginning of 2008 she has been in Miami finishing her music recording with Universal Records and learning English at the University of Miami. In early 2011, Jery was invited to travel to New York and appear as a guest on the Dcan Guff songs "Ella" and "Todito De Ti".
