= Carolina Rincón =

Mexican actress

Carolina Rincon (born January 19, 1984) is a Mexican actress from Navojoa, Sonora. She debuted on Big Brother México. In 2006 she began playing the role of Venus Carvajal in the telenovela Código Postal.
