= Código Postal =

- Genre: Telenovela
- Created by: Sergio Vainman; Marily Pugno
- Written by: Ximena Suárez; Aída Guajardo; Janely Lee; Carlos Daniel González; Jesús Calzada; Gabriel Briceño; Enna Márquez
- Directed by: Benjamín Cann; Juan Carlos de Llaca
- Starring: África Zavala; Jery Sandoval; Jose Ron; Jessica Coch; Imanol Landeta; Altair Jarabo
- Opening theme: "Código Postal" by Ha*Ash
- Ending theme: "Código Postal" by Duho
- Country of origin: Mexico
- Original language: Spanish
- No. of episodes: 195

Production
- Executive producer: José Alberto Castro
- Production locations: Filming; Televisa San Ángel; Mexico City, Mexico; Locations; Acapulco, Mexico
- Cinematography: Fernando Chacón
- Camera setup: Multi-camera
- Running time: 21–22 minutes (episodes 1-10); 41–44 minutes (episodes 11-200)
- Production company: Televisa

Original release
- Network: Canal de las Estrellas
- Release: May 29, 2006 – February 23, 2007

Related
- Baie des flamboyants (2007)

Código Postal (lit. "Postal code") is a Mexican youth telenovela produced by José Alberto Castro for Televisa in 2006.

The serial takes place in Acapulco, a popular tourist destination in the state of Guerrero, Mexico. The series is set within an exclusive gated community where the bulk of the cast resides. Like many Mexican telenovelas the cast comprises young, attractive actors, and many of the plotlines revolve around suspense, heavy struggles, love and romance.

On Monday, May 29, 2006, Canal de las Estrellas started broadcasting Código Postal weekdays at 6:30pm, replacing Rebelde. The last episode was broadcast on Friday, February 23, 2007 with Lola...Érase una vez replacing it the following Monday.

Jery Sandoval which was replaced by Africa Zavala and José Ron starred as protagonists, Altair Jarabo, Imanol Landeta, Eugenio Siller, Jacqueline García, Ulises de la Torre and Claudia Godínez starred as young co-protagonists, while Andrea García, Jessica Coch, Ana Bertha Espín and Guillermo García Cantú starred as antagonists.

== Cast ==
=== Main ===
- África Zavala as Victoria Villarreal
- Jery Sandoval as Regina Corona
- José Ron as Patricio González de la Vega Mendoza/Patricio Zubieta Mendoza
- Andrea García as Ivette Fernández de de Alba
- Jessica Coch as Juana "Joanna" Villarreal
- Ana Bertha Espín as Jessica Mendoza de González de la Vega/Jessica Mendoza de Zubieta
- Guillermo García Cantú as Claudio Garza Moheno
- Altair Jarabo as Afrodita Carvajal
- Imanol Landeta as Pablo Rojas Alonso
- Eugenio Siller as Rafael Rojas Alonso
- Jacqueline García as Marcela Garza Durán
- Ulises de la Torre as Ezequiel Gutiérrez Santos
- Claudia Godínez as Inés Garza Durán

=== Supporting ===
- Verónica Castro as Beatríz Corona
- Roberto Blandón as Raúl González de la Vega
- Gabriela Goldsmith as Minerva Carvajal
- Diego Dreyfus as Óscar Zubieta
- Aarón Hernán as Don Guillermo de Alba
- Leticia Perdigón as Esperanza Santos de Gutiérrez
- Rafael Inclán as Avelino Gutiérrez
- Arlette Pacheco as Gloria Durán de Garza
- Luz María Jerez as Irene Alonso de Rojas
- Marco Muñoz as Adrián Garza Moheno
- Luis Gatica as Germán de Alba
- Roberto Ballesteros as Bruno Zubieta
- Rafael Puente Jr. as Héctor Garza Durán
- Michelle Ramaglia as Daniela Gutiérrez Santos
- Jorge Consejo as Ignacio Ibargüengoitia Rosas-Priego
- Jaye Alonzo Topete as Rodrigo Marquéz
- Mariana Rountree as Alexa Torres-Landa Haddad
- Carolina Rincón as Venus Carvajal
- Ferdinando Valencia as Guillermo "Memo" de Alba Fernández
- Daniel Berlanga as Luca Villarreal
- Elsa Cárdenas as Josefina de Alba
- Miguel Pérez as Jesús "Chuy" Gutiérrez Santos
- Renata Notni as Andrea Garza Durán
- Lucía Pailles as Toña*Beatriz Monroy as Flora
- Evelyn Solares as Chole*Martin Navarrete as
- Poncho de Nigris as Mateo Ayala
- Úrsula Montserrat as Rocío de la Peña
- Ilithya Manzanilla as Dafne de la Peña
- Rodrigo Santacruz as Willy

=== Notable guest stars ===
- Adal Ramones as Himself
- Yordi Rosado as Himself
- Mauricio Castillo as Himself
- Carlos Loret de Mola as Himself

== Awards ==
Year	Award	Category	Nominee	Result
2007	25th TVyNovelas Awards	Best Young Lead Actor	Imanol Landeta	Won
