= Rafaela (TV series) =

- Genre: Telenovela
- Created by: Delia Fiallo
- Written by: Katia R. Estrada; Enna Márquez
- Directed by: Victor Manuel Fouilloux; Xavier Romero
- Starring: Scarlet Ortiz; Jorge Poza; Diana Bracho; Rogelio Guerra; Chantal Andere
- Opening theme: Mi niña bonita performed by Chino & Nacho
- Ending theme: Pobre Corazón performed by Chino & Nacho
- Country of origin: Mexico
- Original language: Spanish
- No. of episodes: 120

Production
- Executive producer: Nathalie Lartilleux
- Producer: Leticia Díaz
- Production locations: Filming; Televisa San Ángel; Mexico City, Mexico; Locations; Faldas de Popocateptl, Mexico; Puebla, Mexico; Puerto Vallarta, Mexico; Jalisco, Mexico; San Cristóbal de las Casas, Mexico; Chiapas, Mexico; Mexico City, Mexico
- Camera setup: Multi-camera
- Running time: 42-45 minutes
- Production company: Televisa

Original release
- Network: Canal de las Estrellas
- Release: January 31 – July 15, 2011

Related
- Rafaela (1977)

Rafaela is a Spanish-language Mexican telenovela produced by Nathalie Lartilleux for Televisa, and aired on Canal de las Estrellas from January 31, 2011 to July 15, 2011. It is based on the Venezuelan telenovela of the same name produced in 1977.

Scarlet Ortiz and Jorge Poza starred as protagonists, while Diana Bracho, Chantal Andere, Arleth Terán, Arturo Carmona, Jan, Jorge Alberto Bolaños and Michelle Ramaglia starred as antagonists. Rogelio Guerra and Patricia Reyes Spíndola starred as stellar performances.

In the United States, Univision aired Rafaela from June 20, 2011 to October 14, 2011.

== Cast ==
=== Main ===
- Scarlet Ortiz as Rafaela Martínez/Rafaela de la Vega Martínez - Rafael and Caridad's daughter, Morelia's stepdaughter, sister of Alicia, Rosalba, Luli, Belen, Chucho and Goyito, Arely's friend, ex-wife of Angel, in love with Jose Maria
- Jorge Poza as José María Báez - Mireya's husband, Ileana's ex-boyfriend, in love with Rafaela

=== Also main ===
- Diana Bracho as Morelia Echaverria de de La Vega - Alicia's mother and Rafaela's stepmother, Rafael's wife, Rene's aunt
- Chantal Andere as Mireya Vival de Báez - Jose Maria's wife, Morelia's friend and accomplice
- Rogelio Guerra as Dr. Rafael de la Vega - Rafaela and Alicia's father, Morelia's husband, in love with Caridad
- Patricia Reyes Spíndola as Caridad Martinez, sister in law of Morelia and mother of Rafaela, Rosalba, Belen, Luli, Chucho, and Goyito, Braulio's partner, Rafael's love interest
- Tiare Scanda as Rosalba Martinez - Caridad's daughter, sister of Rafaela, Belen, Luli, Goyito, and Chucho, in love with Carlos Luis
- Manuel "El Loco" Valdés as Braulio

=== Recurring ===
- Arleth Terán as Ileana Contreras - Jose Maria's ex-girlfriend, Alfredo's ex-wife, Mireya's accomplice
- Rubén Zamora as Ángel Grajales - Rafaela's dedicated ex-husband
- Arturo Carmona as Victor Acuña - Footballer, Mireya's accomplice, obsessed with Rafaela
- Sheyla as Amanda - Nurse at the San Rafael Hospital, Rafaela's friend
- Ilean Almaguer as Alicia de la Vega Echaverria - Rafaela's sister, daughter of Morelia and Rafael, in love with Chucho
- Juan Carlos Flores as Chucho Martinez - Brother of Rafaela, Rosabla, Belen, Luli and Goyito, Caridad's son, in love with Alicia
- Arlette Pacheco as Amelia
- Isadora González as Elizabeth Jacome
- Jan as René Echevarría - Morelia's nephew
- Manuela Ímaz as Arely Herrera - Rafaela's friend, Carlos Luis's wife
- Juan Ángel Esparza as Carlos Luis Fernandez - Arely's husband
- Eduardo Rivera as Alfredo Contreras - Ileana's ex-husband
- Nicolás Menaas Raul Herrera
- Katherine Kellerman as Delia
- Silvia Ramírez as Camila Rojas
- Isabel Martínez "La Tarabilla" as Rosario
- Michelle Ramaglia as Felipa
- Rosángela Balbó a Sara
- Theo Tapia as Ernesto
- Jorge Alberto Bolaños as Porfirio - Bar owner, in love with Rosalba
- Mario Sauret as Cosme
- Evelyn Cedeño as Belén Martínez - Caridad's daughter, sister of Rafaela, Rosalba, Luli, Chucho and Goyito
- arai Meza as Luli Martínez - Caridad's daughter, sister of Rafaela, Rosabla, Belen, Chucho and Goyito
- Emanuel Chikoto as Goyito Martínez' - Caridad's son, brother of Rafaela, Rosabla, Belen, Chucho and Luli
- Sergio Jurado as Bruno
- Yulyenette Anaya as Romana
- Lourdes Canale as Doña Rocío
- Silvia Suárez as Suzette
- Oscar Ferreti as Canito
- Hugo Macías Macotela as Lino
- Geraldine Galván as Lupita
- Fernanda Ruiz as Refugio
- Arturo Laphan as Enrique
- Harding Junior as El Negro
- Mayahuel del Monte as Ninón
- Antonio Zamudio as Cienfuegos
- Oswaldo Zarate as El Flaco
- Marina Marín as Flor
- Maricruz Nájera as Constanza
- Ana Isabel Corral as Genoveva
- Rafael del Villar as Fernando
- Aurora Clavel as Refugio
- Sofía Tejeda as Isabel
- Javier Ruán as Chamula
- Benjamín Rivero as Fabián
- María Sandoval as Berta
- Nicolás Mena as Raúl
- Roberto Romano as Roger

== Awards ==
=== TVyNovelas Awards ===
| Year | Category | Nominee | Result |
|---|---|---|---|
| 2012 | Best Female Antagonist | Chantal Andere | Nominated |
| 2012 | Best First Actor | Rogelio Guerra | Nominated |
| 2012 | Best First Actress | Patricia Reyes Spíndola | Nominated |
