= Carlos Athié =

Mexican actor, model and TV presenter

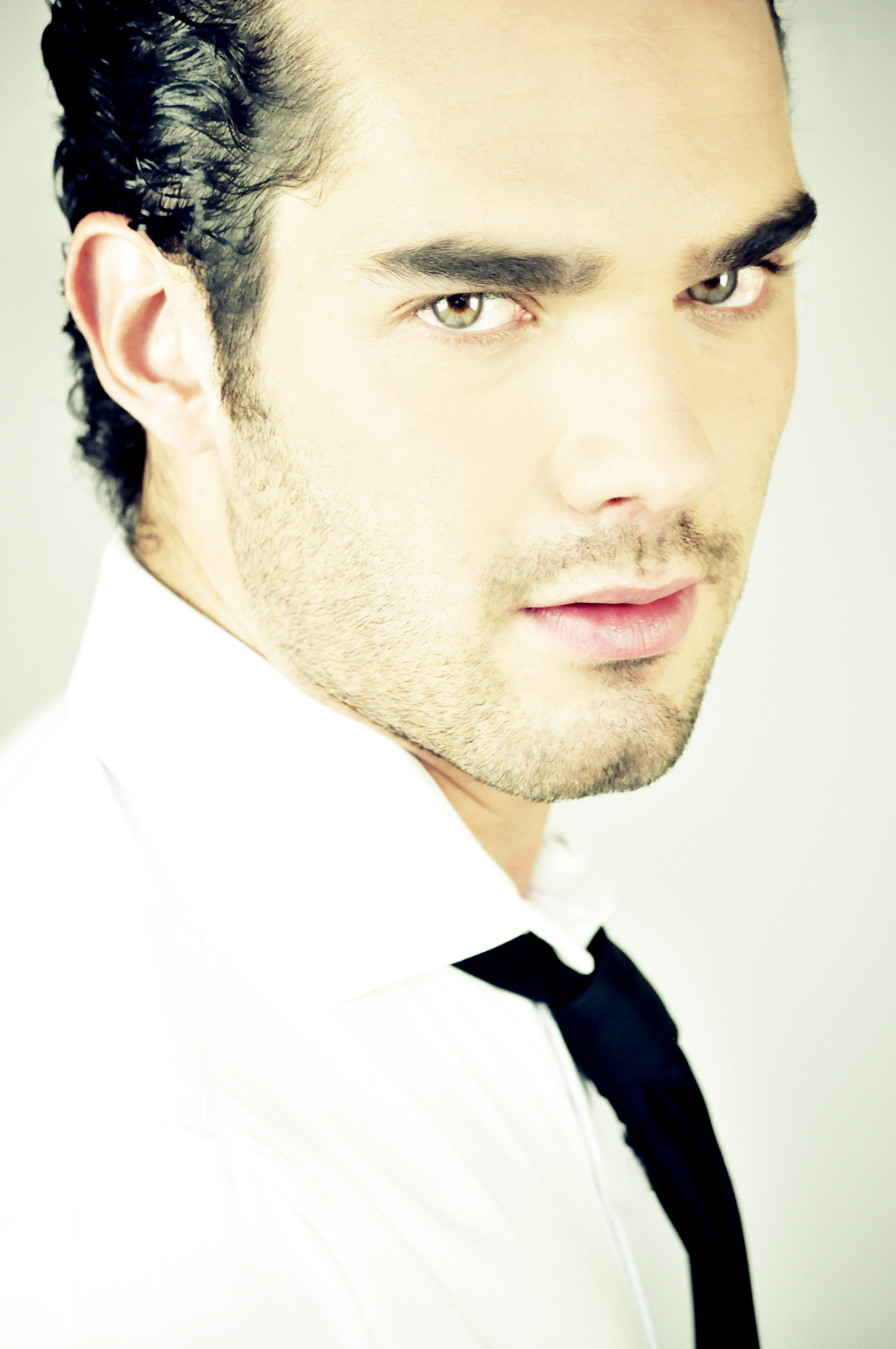
- Born: Carlos Harfuch Álvarez; February 27, 1987 (age 39); Mexico City, Mexico
- Occupations: Actor, model, TV presenter
- Years active: 1999-present
- Website: Carlos Athié's official site

Carlos Athié (born Carlos Harfuch Álvarez; on February 27, 1987, in Mexico City, Mexico) is a Mexican actor, model and TV presenter.

== Career ==
Carlos Athié has previously portrayed Alejandro Sandoval in La ruta Blanca (2012),his debut as Lucas in Telemundo program Una Maid en Manhattan (2011–2012), a bisexual character in Las Trampas del Deseo, and an architect in the Fernando Sariñana television show Amor sin Reserva.

== Filmography ==
Television
Year	Title	Role	Notes
2011	Una Maid en Manhattan	Lucas González	Television debut
2012	La ruta blanca	Alejandro Sandoval	Lead role
2013	Las trampas del deseo	Jonás	Special appearance
2014	Amor sin reserva	Esteban Martínez	
2015	Que te perdone Dios	Max	
2016	Simplemente María	Ernesto	
2017	Falsos Falsificados	Marcos	
2017	La doble vida de Estela Carrillo	El Baron	
2018	José José, el príncipe de la canción	Pedro Salas	
