= Verónica Velasco =

Mexican politician

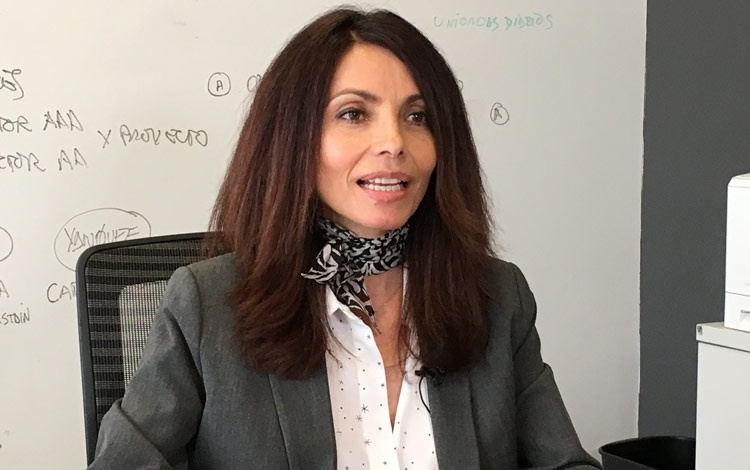
- Born: 23 January 1972 (age 54); Tampico, Tamaulipas, Mexico
- Occupation: Politician
- Political party: PVEM

Verónica Velasco Rodríguez (born 23 January 1972) is a Mexican politician affiliated with the Ecologist Green Party of Mexico. As of 2014 she served as Senator of the LVIII and LIX Legislatures of the Mexican Congress representing Baja California Sur and as Deputy of the LVII and LX Legislatures.
