= Atrapada (2018 TV series) =

- Genre: Drama
- Written by: Joaquín Gorriz; Roberto Jiménez
- Directed by: Javier Solar; Salvador Espinosa
- Starring: África Zavala; Erick Chapa
- Country of origin: Mexico
- Original language: Spanish
- No. of seasons: 1
- No. of episodes: 60

Production
- Executive producer: Marcel Ferrer
- Production company: Sony Pictures Television

Original release
- Network: Imagen Televisión
- Release: 3 September – 23 November 2018

Atrapada is a Mexican drama television series produced by Sony Pictures Television for Imagen Televisión, that premiered on 3 September 2018 and ended on 23 November 2018. The series revolves around Mariana, a beautiful young woman who becomes a professional thief after the murder of her parents. In the United States it premiered on UniMás on 21 January 2019 and ended on 23 April 2019.

== Plot ==
Mariana is an attractive and intelligent young woman, who is capable of seducing any man she desires. After witnessing the murder of her parents, Mariana, just a teenager, is forced to live in the streets and earn a living as a shoeshiner in order to support her younger siblings. She meets Sebastián, who turns her into a skilled white-collar thief. Years later, Mariana's life of theft takes an unexpected turn when Carlos Alberto Herrera, the head of a powerful Mexican family to which Mariana tried to trick, has kidnapped her brothers in exchange for the completion of an important mission. Mariana must infiltrate the Vargas family and seduce the two Vargas brothers to create dissension between them and finally destroy them. The mission becomes more difficult when Mariana realizes that she is falling in love with Felipe Vargas. Now, she will face the biggest challenge of her life to save her brothers. She finds herself face to face with the man who killed her parents. Mariana will not rest until she discovers the culprit of the death of her parents.

== Cast ==
=== Main ===
- África Zavala as Mariana Velasco/Luz Quintero
- Erick Chapa as Felipe Vargas
- Rubén Zamora as Sebastián Márquez
- Giuseppe Gamba as Alexander Vargas
- Verónica Merchant as Daniela Vargas
- Fernando Ciangherotti as Carlos Alberto Herrera
- Gabriela Roel as Amelia Herrera
- Camila Selser as Brenda Herrera
- Jaime Del Águila as Darío Herrera
- Pamela Almanza as Aurora de Vargas
- Ale Müller as Corina Herrera
- David Caro Levy as Pablo
- Alessio Valentini as Luis
- Sofía Garza as Noemí

=== Recurring ===
- Patricia Reyes Spíndola as Marcela
- Claudette Maillé as Renata Garay
- Evelyn Cedeño as Cristina
- Miguel Ángel Biaggio as Marcos
- Ricardo Kleinbaum as Porfirio Duarte
- María José Magan as Sofía

== Production ==
The start of production was confirmed on October 23, 2017. The series is produced by Sony Pictures Television, written by Joaquín Gorriz and Roberto Jiménez, directed by Javier Solar and Salvador Espinosa, and produced by Marcel Ferrer. A total of 60 episodes were confirmed.

=== Casting ===
On October 23, 2017, it was confirmed that África Zavala and Erick Chapa will be playing the main characters of the series, along with Giuseppe Gamba, Verónica Merchant and Fernando Ciangherotti.

== Ratings ==
=== Mexico ratings ===
Viewership and ratings per season of Atrapada
Season	Episodes	First aired		Last aired		Avg. viewers (millions)	18–49 rank
Season	Episodes	Date	Viewers (millions)	Date	Viewers (millions)	Avg. viewers (millions)	18–49 rank
1	60	3 September 2018	0.58	23 November 2018	0.57	0.47	TBD

=== U.S. ratings ===
Viewership and ratings per season of Atrapada
Season	Episodes	First aired		Last aired		Avg. viewers (millions)	18–49 rank
Season	Episodes	Date	Viewers (millions)	Date	Viewers (millions)	Avg. viewers (millions)	18–49 rank
1	60	21 January 2019	0.21	23 April 2019	0.31	0.25	TBD

== Episodes ==
No.	Title	Original air date	U.S. air date	Mexico viewers (millions)	U.S. viewers (millions)
1	"Atrapada"	3 September 2018	21 January 2019	0.58	0.21
Mariana leads a double life as a white-collar thief next to her mentor Sebastián. Mariana is discovered trying to steal from Carlos Alberto, an arms dealer, and to save the lives of her brothers she decides to help him destroy the Vargas.
2	"El pasado de Mariana regresa"	4 September 2018	22 January 2019	0.42	0.29
Mariana takes the identity of Luz and infiltrates the Vargas distillery to get closer to Felipe and Alexander. Mariana recognizes the murderer of her parents and swears revenge at the grave of her parents. Carlos asks Mariana to steal plans for the refurbishment of the distillery to close the factory. Pablo and Luis try to escape.
3	"Al borde del peligro"	5 September 2018	23 January 2019	0.34	0.30
Brenda makes it clear to her employees that she is the one makes decisions about the life of Pablo and Luis. Felipe does not want to continue with the arms business, but Daniela pressures him to continue. Darío orders Felipe to be killed, but Mariana manages to save him. At Felipe's engagement party to Noemí, Mariana attempts to obtain the plans requested by Carlos Alberto Herrera by accessing Daniela's safe, but things don't go as planned.
4	"Un regalo de bodas"	6 September 2018	24 January 2019	0.45	0.21
Mariana gains the trust of the Vargas family. Noemí suffers a revenge from which there will be no return. Carlos Alberto convinces Renata to use the plans that Mariana got to close the Vargas distillery. Darío kills Humberto for not fulfilling his orders.
5	"No me llames Lucecita"	7 September 2018	25 January 2019	0.40	0.32
Daniela blames Darío for Naomi's death through a false hit man and Felipe plans to take revenge. Pablo approaches Corina to ask for help and Brenda finds out. Daniela and Alexander take extreme measures to reopen the distillery.
6	"Esto quedará entre nosotros"	10 September 2018	28 January 2019	0.42	0.20
Mariana kills Vicente in self defense and Alexander helps her hide the body. The Vargas find out that Darío Herrera is still alive. The Vargas believe that there is an infiltrator and they begin to suspect of Mariana.
7	"Un millón de pesos"	11 September 2018	29 January 2019	0.32	0.24
Aurora is abducted and they ask for a million pesos for her life. The jealousy that Felipe feels towards Mariana leads him to accuse her of Aurora's abduction. Mariana advises Daniela to speak directly with Carlos Alberto to stop the war between Alexander and Darío.
8	"El beso"	12 September 2018	30 January 2019	0.47	0.26
Sebastián's plan takes effect and makes the Vargas turn their attention from Mariana towards him. The friction between Felipe and Alexander is growing by Luz, however, Felipe takes the lead. Carlos Alberto plans to take advantage of the truce with the Vargas and Darío's plan to marry Cristina. Sebastián discovers that Corina is his daughter.
9	"¿Quieres ver a mamá enojada?"	13 September 2018	31 January 2019	0.44	0.26
A client tries to acquire a batch of weapons and tries to decide between the Herrera and the Vargas. In order to close the important negotiation, Daniela forces Felipe to ask Luz for a very special favor. Alexander and Felipe find Sebastián.
10	"La traición"	14 September 2018	1 February 2019	0.45	0.23
Liberto decides to buy the weapons from the Vargas and Carlos Alberto asks Mariana to get the coordinates of the delivery to intercept it. Marcela sends her people to save Sebastián de los Vargas.
11	"Los sacrificios"	17 September 2018	4 February 2019	0.46	0.22
Felipe and Alexander survive the Vargas ambush. Mariana is increasingly earning the trust of the Vargas family, but the situation leaves sacrifices such as the farewell of Juana, the maid of the family. Daniela plans to use Porfirio to finish with the Vargas. Sebastián takes advantage of Corina's party to get into the Vargas' house and steal the jade mask.
12	"El plan de Mariana"	18 September 2018	5 February 2019	0.41	0.33
Darío suffers from an overdose and is taken to the hospital. Marcela tells Sebastián the truth about how his daughter was robbed. Daniela takes advantage of Carlos Alberto's business to put it in evidence and Brenda is arrested. Darío is agonizing, but Felipe Vargas wants to finish him off and plans to finish him off at the hospital.
13	"Jurar venganza"	19 September 2018	6 February 2019	0.46	0.23
Felipe tries to kill Darío and he confesses that he did not kill Noemí. Daniela wants Mariana to start a relationship with Felipe, but he still does not overcome Noemí's death and swears revenge against the one who killed her. Sebastián confirms through a DNA test that Corina is his daughter.
14	"El descubrimiento de Carlos Alberto"	20 September 2018	7 February 2019	0.47	0.27
Mariana opens her heart to Felipe. Pablo tells Corina that she is not Brenda's daughter and decides to contact Sebastián. Mariana and Sebastián have 48 hours to steal Marcela's jade mask and save the life of Pablo and Luis.
15	"La seducción"	21 September 2018	8 February 2019	0.39	0.23
Mariana seduces Alexander and convinces him to attack the Herrera ranch. Sebastián and Corina meet to talk about their lives. Carlos Alberto Herrera falls seriously ill, Amelia begins to poison him as revenge for his mistreatment.
16	"La negociación"	24 September 2018	11 February 2019	0.44	0.28
Alexander is captured by Carlos Alberto and asks Daniela to release Brenda in exchange for her son's life, but she refuses. Mariana does not manage to return the mask of Jade, but she offers to Carlos Alberto to obtain Brenda’s freedom. Daniela seeks to betray the negotiations and plans Alexander’s escape.
17	"Revelar la identidad"	25 September 2018	12 February 2019	0.49	0.18
Mariana discovers that Cristina and Daniela are allied against the Herrera. Daniela decides to take revenge on the Herrera by eliminating Renata, but Mariana prevents it. Brenda tells Corina part of the truth of how she adopted her. Renata ends her love affair with Carlos Alberto Herrera and warns him that Amelia is aware of it.
18	"Felipe duda de Mariana"	26 September 2018	13 February 2019	0.42	0.23
Felipe is involved in Inés’ death and both he and the police begin to suspect that Mariana had to do with the case. Carlos Alberto's health continues to deteriorate and he discovers that Amalia has been poisoning him.
19	"Mariana se queda sin coartada"	27 September 2018	14 February 2019	0.48	0.26
Sebastián is blamed for Ines’ death to save his life and make Mariana free. Mariana asks Carlos Alberto to release her brothers in exchange for giving him information about Cristina and Daniela. Corina is determined to escape from the Herrera ranch and plans to take Pablo and Luis with her.
20	"Cristina podría delatar a Mariana"	28 September 2018	15 February 2019	0.52	0.27
Brenda kills Cristina to make her pay for her betrayal. Darío saves Marcos' life and they decide to start a new life together. Corina carries out her plan to escape with Pablo and Luis but Carlos Alberto Herrera suspects that Mariana is involved and threatens to put a knife in her neck.
21	"El accidente de Corina"	1 October 2018	18 February 2019	0.50	0.27
Corina's accident puts her on the verge of death and Carlos Alberto Herrera seeks revenge by taking over Pablo's life. Sebastián looks for Luis in the forest. Daniela intends to use Felipe's plan to take the land from Carlos Alberto. Felipe continues to suspect Mariana's true intentions.
22	"Mariana se enfrenta a Brenda"	2 October 2018	19 February 2019	0.48	0.26
Darío must make a decision that puts Marcos' life at stake. Mariana has to fulfill a new mission for the Herrera, but her desperation leads her to confront Brenda. Brenda makes Mariana believe that Luis is dead. Felipe tries to buy the land near the distillery legally and meets with Carlos Alberto. Mariana offers to go with Alexander to Nuevo Laredo to bribe the chief of customs.
23	"En la mira"	3 October 2018	20 February 2019	0.45	0.23
Revealing the secrets of Carlos Alberto's bedroom, gives the Vargas a weapon that could hurt Mariana. She has a tough mission. Sebastián asks Marcela to get rid of Tepachero. Alexander and Mariana meet with Martin, the head of customs, to convince him to work for the Vargas. Mariana sabotages the agreement between the Vargas and Martín.
24	"Sembrar el odio"	4 October 2018	21 February 2019	0.47	0.28
Brenda decides to take responsibility for Luis to correct the mistakes she made with Corina. Carlos Alberto sows greed in Pablo. Mariana has a complicated mission. Daniela advises Porfirio to order the seizure of Herrera's weapons to earn points in the polls.
25	"La estafa maestra"	5 October 2018	22 February 2019	0.45	0.29
Mariana must choose between two sides. Aurora has a miscarriage. Pablo is on the verge of a crime. Daniela discovers that Sebastián was the one who stole Porfirio’s pre-Hispanic piece. Felipe proposes Mariana to start from scratch. Darío and Marcos decide to rob the Herrera casino.
26	"Los días contados"	8 October 2018	25 February 2019	0.43	0.23
Carlos Alberto forces Pablo to kill one of the peasants from nearby lands. Mariana discovers that Felipe has caught Pablo. Pancho stops Marcos and Darío before they finish robbing the casino.
27	"Un misterioso enemigo"	9 October 2018	26 February 2019	0.48	0.27
Mariana saves Pablo, but escapes after seeing her with Felipe. Carlos Alberto asks Pancho to look for the casino thief. Sebastián finds Pablo trying to visit Corina in the hospital. Mariana discovers that they are spying on her. Aurora continues with her plan to be able to have a son with Alexander Vargas.
28	"Una triste noticia"	10 October 2018	27 February 2019	0.40	0.26
Carlos Alberto decides that Pablo will take the place of Darío in the ranch. Esperanza has a vision about Luis and warns Mariana to find him before she loses him forever. Felipe decides to remove Mariana from the distillery.
29	"Los secretos de Carlos Alberto"	11 October 2018	28 February 2019	0.45	0.25
Amelia asks Mariana for help to get evidence to demonstrate the romance between Carlos Alberto and Renata. Brenda continues taking care of Luis to give him a better life. Daniela plans to use the foundation's truck to traffic weapons.
30	"El chantaje"	12 October 2018	1 March 2019	0.50	0.23
Renata is threatened with photos and documents that link her to Carlos Alberto and decides to withdraw from the race of the state government. Felipe decides to monitor the route of the truck of the foundation along with Sofía and Mariana.
31	"La pelea entre los Vargas"	15 October 2018	4 March 2019	0.40	0.24
Mariana hands over the shipment of weapons to Pancho. Felipe pressures Daniela and Alexander to give him the rights to the distillery. Pablo begins to learn from Carlos Alberto's business.
32	"El sabotaje"	16 October 2018	5 March 2019	0.38	0.23
Daniela seeks to ruin Felipe, sabotaging the "Don Edgardo" distillery and Mariana discovers her plan. Carlos Alberto finds Brenda taking care of Luis. Felipe asks Mariana to accompany him to visit a special friend. Mariana could break the promise not to sleep with any of her victims, in order to conquer Felipe.
33	"Entre dos bandos"	17 October 2018	6 March 2019	0.51	0.22
Corina wakes up with amnesia and unable to walk. Despite Mariana's efforts to prevent Daniela from sabotaging the distillery, a woman becomes intoxicated with one of the bottles of tequila. Daniela pressures Mariana to choose a side within the Vargas Family. But Mariana's heart gives her strength to face all those who want to hurt the people she loves.
34	"Somos novios"	18 October 2018	7 March 2019	0.47	0.22
Sofía tries to discover why Mariana hid the presence of chemicals in the tequila. The Vargas and Mariana give an interview to clean up the family name and the distillery. Felipe declares Luz as his girlfriend. She must support a side in the internal conflict of the Vargas family. Corina still does not recover her memory.
35	"Arriesgar el corazón"	19 October 2018	8 March 2019	0.47	0.27
Sebastián and Mariana have to steal from Felipe a work of art for Marcela. Darío decides to return to the ranch to support Brenda with Corina. Marcela betrays Sebastián and delivers him to the police, but he commits suicide to avoid it.
36	"El misterio de Luz"	22 October 2018	11 March 2019	0.42	0.20
Mariana discovers that Sebastián is alive. Sofía tries to unmask Mariana. Carlos Alberto confesses to Darío that Amelia tried to poison him. Sebastián approaches Brenda, posing as a doctor and thus helping Corina.
37	"La propuesta de matrimonio"	23 October 2018	12 March 2019	0.51	0.26
Sebastián discovers that Corina has been faking her amnesia. Felipe proposes marriage to Mariana. Darío begins to feel displaced by Pablo. Alexander can not accept that Mariana has chosen Felipe.
38	"En la cueva del lobo"	24 October 2018	13 March 2019	0.47	0.22
Darío murders Marcos to show his loyalty to Carlos Alberto. Pancho betrays Pablo to leave him ill before Carlos Alberto. Felipe and Mariana try to use an escort to put Porfirio at their side, but the situation gets out of control.
39	"Un mensaje de auxilio"	25 October 2018	14 March 2019	0.43	0.18
Mariana listens to a voice message from Luis, Sebastián gets a hacker to track the call. The hacker recognizes Mariana as Felipe's girlfriend and decides to deliver the information to him.
40	"Descubren a Luz"	26 October 2018	15 March 2019	0.45	0.26
Sebastián investigates the true intentions of Sofía, but she discovers him. Pablo is forced to kill a person for the first time. Sofía finds Sebastián and Mariana together and betrays her with Felipe. A new love could be born between Brenda and Jorge.
41	"La confesión"	29 October 2018	18 March 2019	0.45	0.23
Mariana reveals her true identity to Felipe and confesses that she really loves him. Sebastián confirms to Pablo that Luis is alive. Darío discovers that Carlos Alberto has been using Pablo to make sure that Mariana ends the Vargas.
42	"Un encuentro con la verdad"	30 October 2018	19 March 2019	0.39	0.25
Alexander approaches Mariana to take care of her. Pablo tells Corina that he will not leave the ranch now that he is one of Carlos Alberto's men. Carlos Alberto threatens Brenda with killing Luis. Sebastián manages to find Luis, but releasing him seems impossible.
43	"La seducción de Sofía"	31 October 2018	20 March 2019	0.45	0.24
Sofía tries to seduce Felipe on a night of drinking. Carlos Alberto hides Luis inside the ranch and Pablo finds him. Carlos Alberto and Brenda have a strong discussion to see who is staying with Luisito. Daniela has Porfirio win the governorship and asks her to include Renata in his team. Alexander and Mariana kiss without knowing that Felipe is close to them.
44	"Un arranque de pasión"	1 November 2018	25 March 2019	0.46	0.22
Felipe and Mariana try to be honest, but she confesses that she kissed with Alexander. Carlos Alberto is willing to find Mariana and puts Sebastián and Corina's escape plan at risk. Esperanza asks Felipe for help to save Mariana. Mariana has the courage to free her brothers from the clutches of Carlos Alberto Herrera.
45	"El secuestro"	2 November 2018	27 March 2019	0.39	0.25
Mariana and Felipe decide to continue with the wedding plans. Carlos Alberto tells Mariana that he needs to get half the distillery to keep the property. Sofía’s secrets put at risk the life of Mariana and Felipe when they are kidnapped.
46	"El plan de Felipe"	5 November 2018	28 March 2019	0.49	0.20
Felipe gives Mariana an idea to use the wedding as a means to recover her brothers and gives her the marriage contract Carlos Alberto asked for. Alexander looks for the culprits of the distillery robbery. Sofía asks Mariana for help to escape her problems.
47	"Rumbo al altar"	6 November 2018	29 March 2019	0.58	0.23
Mariana and Sebastián have a disagreement because Felipe's rescue plan does not include Corina. Felipe confesses to Mariana that he loves her and wants their wedding to be authentic. Carlos Alberto does not allow Luis to attend Mariana's wedding.
48	"La boda"	7 November 2018	1 April 2019	0.52	0.34
Felipe and Mariana get married, but during the party Pablo allows Darío and Pancho to sneak in among the guests to kidnap Renata. Darío attacks Daniela on Brenda's orders, unleashing a war between the Vargas and the Herrera.
49	"La venganza"	8 November 2018	2 April 2019	0.54	0.30
The Vargas seek revenge for the attack that Daniela suffered, which could trigger a war against the Herrera. Mariana and Felipe try to prevent Alexander from discovering that Pablo was the culprit of the attack. Amelia confronts Carlos Alberto for killing Renata. Pablo starts to separate from everyone including Corina.
50	"En las entrañas de la venganza"	9 November 2018	3 April 2019	0.53	0.24
Sebastián convinces Brenda to take Corina out of the ranch for her rehabilitation. Mariana confirms that the man who killed her parents is not dead and approaches him. Daniela asks Julián to kill Corina and Felipe tries to stop him.
51	"Un duro golpe de realidad"	12 November 2018	4 April 2019	0.43	0.23
Mariana finds the murderer of her parents and has in her hands the possibility of revenge. She discovers that their death was a rite of initiation for Felipe and Alexander. Daniela tries to put an end to the war between her sons and shares a part of her past.
52	"Amor y venganza"	13 November 2018	8 April 2019	0.51	0.30
Mariana discovers who is behind the murder of their parents and decides to collect revenge despite all the love she feels for one of the culprits. Carlos Alberto is affected by the operations of Porfirio and decides to agree a truce with Daniela. Brenda and Darío plan the way to kill the Vargas.
53	"La tregua"	14 November 2018	9 April 2019	0.44	0.27
Mariana's revenge unleashes a fury and will have fatal consequences. Mariana pressures Daniela to accede to the truce with the Herrera. Carlos Alberto meets with Porfirio to ask him to remove the police checkpoints. Mariana is run over. Carlos Alberto puts into action his plan to kill the Vargas during the meeting.
54	"Cría cuervos"	15 November 2018	10 April 2019	0.59	0.22
Brenda shoots Carlos Alberto and blames the Vargas for his death. Mariana confesses to Felipe the truth about the death of her parents. Aurora tells Alexander that the son she expects is not his.
55	"Lavar la culpa"	16 November 2018	15 April 2019	0.49	0.21
Brenda exposes the photographs of Porfirio, destroying the truce between Amelia and Daniela. Alcalá discovers that Sebastián is alive. Corina becomes the universal heiress of Carlos Alberto. Felipe tries to wash his guilt with Mariana by devising a plan to rescue her brothers. Mariana confesses to Sebastián that she is pregnant with Felipe's baby, for whom her plans to flee have to wait.
56	"Enfermos de poder"	19 November 2018	16 April 2019	0.47	0.27
The Herrera ranch goes into chaos due to lack of authority. Felipe reunites Mariana with Luis. Daniela decides to help Porfírio escape from the law. Julián confesses to Alexander and Mariana that he killed Noemi on Daniela's orders.
57	"Un as bajo la manga"	20 November 2018	17 April 2019	0.57	0.25
Mariana confesses to Felipe that Daniela and Julián killed Noemi. Pablo starts his plan and betrays Mariana to take Luis. Brenda discovers that Sebastián has been deceiving her.
58	"Una trampa para la libertad"	21 November 2018	18 April 2019	0.60	0.23
Brenda begins to lose control over her emotions and threatens to kill Pablo. Amelia helps Pablo, Luis, and Corina escape. Mariana confesses to Felipe that she is pregnant. Sofía tells Daniela the whole truth about Mariana.
59	"Identidad descubierta"	22 November 2018	22 April 2019	0.53	0.32
Daniela knows Mariana's true identity and sets a trap to be able to settle accounts face to face. Aurora meets with Darío and Amelia to give them the Vargas' list of contacts. Felipe coordinates with the police Daniela's arrest. Brenda finds Pablo, Luis, and Corina and shoots Sebastián.
60	"Final de Atrapada"	23 November 2018	23 April 2019	0.57	0.31
Daniela and Alexander play Russian roulette with Mariana before killing her. Pablo takes Sebastián to the hospital to prevent him from dying and Alcalá discovers them. Corina says goodbye to Brenda. Daniela reveals to her sons an important secret.
