= Ignacio Sada =

Mexican producer

Ignacio Sada Madero
- Born: Ignacio Sada Madero; Mexico
- Occupation: Producer
- Years active: 1987-present

Ignacio Sada Madero (born in Mexico) is a Mexican producer.

== Filmography ==
Executive Producer, Associate Producer, Production Manager, Production Assistant
Year	Title	Notes
1987-88	Rosa Salvaje	Production Assistant
1989-90	Carrusel	Production Manager
1989-90	Simplemente Maria	Production Manager
1999	Alma rebelde	Associate Producer
2001	Mujer bonita	Executive Producer
2001	La Intrusa	Executive Producer
2007	Bajo las riendas del amor	Executive Producer
2010	Soy tu dueña	Associate Producer
2012	Un refugio para el amor	Executive Producer
2013–2014	Por siempre mi amor	Executive Producer
2015–2016	Simplemente María	Executive Producer
2017	Mi adorable maldición	Executive Producer
2017–2018	Sin tu mirada	Executive Producer
2020–2021	Quererlo todo	Executive Producer
2021-2022	Contigo sí	Executive Producer
2023-2024	Nadie como tú	Executive producer
2025	A.mar, donde el amor teje sus redes	Executive producer
2026	Tan cerca de ti, nace el amor	Executive producer
