= Juan Alejandro Ávila =

Mexican–American actor

- Born: Juan Alejandro Ávila González; March 29, 1973 (age 52); Mexico City, Mexico
- Occupation: Actor
- Years active: 2002–present
- Known for: Some roles in La rosa de Guadalupe
- Television: (See below)
- Height: 1.81 m (5 ft 11 in)

Juan Alejandro Ávila (born as Juan Alejandro Ávila González on March 29, 1973, in Mexico City) is a Mexican–American actor. He is known for playing several roles in series and telenovelas of Televisa and Telemundo. Since 2010 he has participated in various television series produced by Televisa as La rosa de Guadalupe and Como dice el dicho. His last recent participation was in Sin miedo a la verdad of the second season as of 2019.

== Biography ==
Juan Alejandro Avila was born on March 29, 1973, in Mexico City.

=== Career ===
He made his debut as an actor in 2003 with a special participation in the telenovela El alma herida produced by Argos Comunicación of Telemundo, giving the role as Henry. Three years later he participated in the film in the movie Bienvenido paisano and participated in the telenovela Marina as Inspector León Felipe.

Since 2010, he joined Televisa and participated in the television series La Rosa De Guadalupe participating in various episodes.

In 2013, he participated in the television series Kipatla as Salvador. Juan participated in the telenovela La mujer del Vendaval in which he only participated in three episodes, together with the credits of Ariadne Díaz and José Ron. Also in that year, he returned to the United States to participate in the telenovela La patrona as lawyer. In 2014 he participated in the television series Dos Lunas as a military agent.

In 2015, he participated in the telenovela Los miserables portrayed Javier Arteaga. He also returned to Mexico to participate in the series Como dice el dicho. He later participated in the telenovela A que no me dejas in the second season, along with Camila Sodi and Ignacio Casano. Also in that same year, he participated in the series Escándalos:Todo es real excepto sus nombres as Vicente.

In 2016, he joined the cast of the bioserie Hasta que te conocí. In the same year, he participated in the telenovela Mujeres de negro and shortly after in the telenovela La candidata.

From 2017, he portrayed as Jacinto in the telenovela produced by Lucero Suarez Enamorándome de Ramón. Returns to the United States again to participate in the television series by Telemundo Señora Acero: La Coyote.

== Filmography ==
=== Film ===
Year	Title	Role	Notes
2017	El corazón delator	Police officer	Post-production
2017	Tenias que ser tu	Norman	
2006	Bienvenido paisano	Patrullero III	

=== Television ===
Year	Title	Role	Notes
2018–present	Sin miedo a la verdad	Meneses	34 episodes
2018	Por amar sin ley	Ministerio público	2 episodes
2017-18	Señora Acero: La Coyote	Jose Luis	11 episode
2017	Enamorándome de Ramón	Jacinto	6 episodes
2017	La Piloto		1 episode
2016	La candidata		1 episode
2016	Mujeres de negro	Duarte	
2016	Noches con Platanito	Herself	Special participation
2016	Hasta que te conocí	Police	Episode: La luna ya se metió
2015-16	A que no me dejas		47 episodes
2015	Como dice el dicho	Sergio	Episode: Ya no quiero queso... (season 5, episode 45)
2015	Los miserables	Javier Arteaga	2 episodes
2014	Dos Lunas	Militar	
2013	La patrona	Lawyer	16 episodes
2013	Kipatla	Salvador	Episode: En los zapatos de Paula
2013	La mujer del Vendaval	3 episodes	
2010–present	La rosa de Guadalupe	Various	125 episodes
2006-07	Marina	Inspector León Felipe	1 episode
2003	El alma herida	Henry	Television debut: 1 episode
