= Mujeres de negro =

Mexican telenovela

- Genre: Telenovela
- Created by: Martha Carrillo; Cristina García; Gowjejkl
- Based on: Mustat lesket by Laura Suhonen
- Directed by: Fernando Nesme; Lili Garza
- Creative director: Jerry Funes
- Starring: Mayrín Villanueva; Alejandra Barros; Ximena Herrera; Arturo Peniche; Diego Olivera; Alexis Ayala; Leticia Calderón
- Opening theme: "Mujeres de negro"
- Composer: Xavier Asali
- Country of origin: Mexico
- Original language: Spanish
- No. of seasons: 2
- No. of episodes: 51

Production
- Executive producer: Carlos Moreno
- Producer: Hilda Santaella
- Cinematography: Alejandro Frutos; Miguel Del Valle Prieto; Hugo Muñoz
- Editors: Alfredo Sánchez; Mauricio Coronel; Felipe Ortiz; Carlos Yáñez
- Camera setup: Multi-camera
- Production company: Televisa

Original release
- Network: Las Estrellas
- Release: August 22 – October 30, 2016

Mujeres de negro [international title Dressed for mourning] is a Mexican telenovela produced by Carlos Moreno for Televisa. It premiered on August 22, 2016. A total of 50 episodes have been confirmed so far.

The main protagonists are portrayed by Alejandra Barros, Mayrín Villanueva and Ximena Herrera. Leticia Calderón and Arturo Peniche portray the main antagonists, with Diego Olivera and Alexis Ayala.

== Plot ==
In the coastal town of Encino Blanco, three married couples spend the weekend at Coral Beach while their husbands go on a fishing trip on a yacht. Not far from the pier, the yacht explodes. Only chips remain on the surface. The women have to go on with their lives without their husbands, as they had planned.

Vanessa, Jackie and Katia have had comfortable lives and their marriages seem almost perfect, but in reality the women are extremely unhappy because of their husbands.

Julio, Vanessa's husband, has gotten into shady deals that endanger the lives of Vanessa and Diego, his nine-year-old son. Jackie's husband, Lorenzo, is controlling, and humiliates and beats her without allowing her to have a life of her own. Nicolás, Katia's husband, has been in depression for years, with several suicide attempts, breaking his wife's dreams of having a family.

After the "accident", the widows, who were thought to have a normal, quiet lives find their lives transformed into a whirlwind of emotions and imbalance, as the police discover a bomb caused the yacht explosion. Now the police must find the culprit. The three women get into a world in which their lives are always in danger and where the economic interests of laboratories harass them.

== Cast ==
=== Main ===
- Mayrín Villanueva as Vanessa Leal
- Alejandra Barros as Jackie Acosta
- Ximena Herrera as Katia Millán
- Arturo Peniche as Bruno Borgetti
- Diego Olivera as Patricio Bernal
- Alexis Ayala as Julio Zamora
- Leticia Calderón as Irene Palazuelos

=== Secondary ===
- Bruno Bichir as Zacarías Zaldívar
- Marcelo Córdoba as Eddy Quijano
- Mark Tacher as Nicolás Lombardo
- Francisco Gattorno as Lorenzo Rivera
- Lourdes Reyes as Rita Kuri
- Emmanuel Palomares as José Rivera
- Manuel Ojeda as Enríquez
- Julieta Egurrola as Isabella de Zamora
- Lilia Aragón as Catalina de Lombardo
- Diego Escalona as Diego Zamora
- Pedro Sicard as Arturo
- Marco de Paula as Sandro
- Yolanda Ventura as Giovanna
- Isabella Camil as Miriam del Villar
- Jean Paul Leroux as Lascurain
- Lupita Lara as Tania
- Juan Ángel Esparza as Víctor Martínez
- Iván Caraza as Esteban
- Paola Real as Danna Quijano

=== Recurring ===
- Adanely Núñez as Rebeca
- Arlette Pacheco as Elisa
- Ricardo Franco as Rico
- Jonathan Kuri as Alberto Ramos
- Sandra Kai as Ximena
- Jony Hernández as Ramírez
- Juan Alejandro Ávila as Duarte
- Michel Gregorio

== Series overview ==
Season	Episodes	Originally released	
Season	Episodes	First released	Last released
1	27	August 22, 2016	September 27, 2016
2	24	September 28, 2016	October 30, 2016

== Episodes ==
=== Season 1 ===
No. overall	No. in season	Title	Original release date
1	1	"¿Homicidio?"	August 22, 2016
2	2	"Julio sobrevive"	August 23, 2016
3	3	"Katia toca fondo"	August 24, 2016
4	4	"Zacarías es un gran peligro"	August 25, 2016
5	5	"Quiero mi dinero"	August 26, 2016
6	6	"Arrebatos"	August 29, 2016
7	7	"La oferta"	August 30, 2016
8	8	"Obsesiones"	August 31, 2016
9	9	"Todo tiene un precio"	September 1, 2016
10	10	"¡Julio aparece frente a Vanessa!"	September 2, 2016
11	11	"¡ZZ no se vende!"	September 5, 2016
12	12	"Silencio eterno"	September 6, 2016
13	13	"En contra de Palazuelos"	September 7, 2016
14	14	"Jackie toma el control"	September 8, 2016
15	15	"Palazuelos se doblega ante Jackie"	September 9, 2016
16	16	"Jackie entre la vida y la muerte"	September 12, 2016
17	17	"Julio reaparece y amenaza a Irene"	September 13, 2016
18	18	"¡Vanessa y Julio regresan para empezar de nuevo!"	September 14, 2016
19	19	"Katia cegada por los celos"	September 15, 2016
20	20	"Julio descubre la verdad"	September 16, 2016
21	21	"Borgetti secuestra a Julio"	September 19, 2016
22	22	"Julio se despide"	September 20, 2016
23	23	"Jackie y Patricio se entregan al amor"	September 21, 2016
24	24	"Miriam descubre la infidelidad de Bruno"	September 22, 2016
25	25	"Katia cae en la trampa"	September 23, 2016
26	26	"Bruno en contra de Patricio"	September 26, 2016
27	27	"Irene juega sucio para quedarse con todo"	September 27, 2016

=== Season 2 ===
No. overall	No. in season	Title	Original release date
28	1	"Miriam decide destruir a Borgetti"	September 28, 2016
29	2	"¡Julio logra escapar!"	September 29, 2016
30	3	"Julio quiere quedarse con Diego"	September 30, 2016
31	4	"Irene y Borgetti tienen nuevos planes"	October 3, 2016
32	5	"Vanessa se entera de la traición de Katia"	October 4, 2016
33	6	"Irene sufre por la muerte de Víctor"	October 5, 2016
34	7	"Diego y Julio sufren un terrible accidente"	October 6, 2016
35	8	"Borgetti secuestra a Diego"	October 7, 2016
36	9	"Borgetti encuentra el punto débil de Bernal"	October 10, 2016
37	10	"Irene es engañada por Borgetti"	October 11, 2016
38	11	"Sale a la luz que Borgetti y Rita tienen un hijo"	October 12, 2016
39	12	"Katia dispara contra Marcial"	October 13, 2016
40	13	"Vanessa quiere a Julio lejos de su vida"	October 14, 2016
41	14	"¡Julio Zamora está muerto!"	October 17, 2016
42	15	"Borgetti el nuevo dueño de Farmateca"	October 18, 2016
43	16	"Irene trata de escapar de la policía"	October 19, 2016
44	17	"Miriam es inculpada por los delitos de Farmateca"	October 20, 2016
45	18	"Vanessa, Arturo y Edy un triángulo amoroso"	October 21, 2016
46	19	"Patricio se entera de la verdad"	October 24, 2016
47	20	"Irene y Miriam van a la cárcel"	October 25, 2016
48	21	"Rita encuentra pistas para hundir a Borgetti"	October 26, 2016
49	22	"Borgetti quita a Irene de su camino"	October 27, 2016
50	23	"Patricio detiene a Jackie, Vanessa y Katia"	October 28, 2016
51	24	"Capítulo final"	October 30, 2016

== Awards and nominations ==
Year	Award	Category	Nominated	Result
2017	35th TVyNovelas Awards	Best Series	Carlos Moreno	Won
2017	35th TVyNovelas Awards	Best Actress in Series	Mayrin Villanueva	Nominated
2017	35th TVyNovelas Awards	Best Actor in Series	Diego Olivera	Won
