= Bajo la misma piel =

Mexican telenovela

- Also known as: El verdadero amor sólo se vive... Bajo la misma piel
- Genre: Telenovela; Drama; Romance
- Created by: Martha Carrillo; Cristina García
- Written by: Virginia Quintana; Ricardo Tejeda
- Directed by: Julián Pastor; Luis Reyes
- Starring: Kate del Castillo; Juan Soler; Diana Bracho; Alejandro Tommassi; Alejandro Camacho
- Opening theme: "Cuatro pasiones bajo la misma piel (Opening Medley)" by Marco Antonio Muñiz, José José, Nicho Hinojosa and Eduardo Capetillo
- Country of origin: Mexico
- Original language: Spanish
- No. of episodes: 95

Production
- Executive producer: Carlos Moreno Laguillo
- Production locations: Televisa San Ángel; Mexico City, Mexico
- Cinematography: Julián Pastor; Alfredo Sánchez
- Camera setup: Multi-camera
- Running time: 41-44 minutes
- Production company: Televisa

Original release
- Network: Canal de las Estrellas
- Release: September 15, 2003 – January 16, 2004

Bajo la misma piel (English title: Under your Skin) is a Mexican telenovela produced by Carlos Moreno Laguillo for Televisa. It is based on an original story by Martha Carrillo and Cristina García.

It premiered on September 15, 2003, and ended on January 16, 2004.

Despite huge exposure prior to its premiere, Bajo la misma piel was only a moderate success in its country of origin and a virtual flop during its airing in the United States by Univision.

The series stars Kate del Castillo, Juan Soler, Diana Bracho, Alejandro Tommassi and Alejandro Camacho.

== Plot ==
For 25 years, Sara (Diana Bracho) has been married to Bruno Murillo (Alejandro Camacho) and her life with him has been hell on earth. Bruno is a fifty-year-old dominant and harsh man, who cheats on her with other women and firmly believes that money can buy everything. It is evident that this is not an ideal marriage; however, Bruno would not let her divorce him.

Even though Sara's daughter, Miranda (Kate del Castillo), is a modern, vivacious and very intelligent young woman, she has fallen in the same type of relationship that her parents have. Her fiancé, Patricio (Sergio Catalán), is an ambitious and hypocritical man, whose low moral principles allowed him to become the secret lover of Paula (Laisha Wilkins), Miranda's half-sister, with no remorse.

Miranda begins to feel uncertain about her feelings for Patricio when she meets Alejandro (Juan Soler), for whom she has an irresistible attraction. Alejandro cannot deny his love for her either, and although there are countless obstacles between them, they are determined to struggle for their happiness.

Regina (Azela Robinson) is Sara's sister and temporarily lives with her. She was once a virtuous, pure young lady who believed in love, but her fiancé abandoned her a few days before their wedding.

Nowadays, Regina lives her sexuality to the fullest under just one rule: single men only. Her greatest conflict arises when she falls in love with Eugenio (Alejandro Tommassi), the husband of her best friend, and she cannot control her passion for him.

Esther (Marga López), Sara and Regina's mother, is the mainstay of the women of her family. She is the only one who experienced true love with her husband. Although she has lost the battle against cancer, she has not let depression put her down. With vigor and optimism, she keeps supporting her daughters and granddaughter to give them the strength they need to find and defend their true love.

== Cast ==
=== Main ===
- Kate del Castillo as Miranda
- Juan Soler as Alejandro
- Diana Bracho as Sara
- Alejandro Tommassi as Eugenio
- Alejandro Camacho as Bruno

=== Also main ===
- Susana Zabaleta as Ivonne
- Manuel Ojeda as Rodrigo
- Azela Robinson as Regina
- Pedro Armendáriz as Joaquín
- Marga López as Esther

=== Recurring and guest stars ===
- Lupita Lara as Rebeca
- Mariana Karr as Alina
- Sergio Catalán as Patricio
- Laisha Wilkins as Paula
- Ernesto D'alessio as Andrés
- Isadora González as Norma
- Andrea Torre as Roberta
- Alejandro Aragón as Marcos
- Dacia Arcaráz as Erika
- Jorge Alberto Bolaños as Navarro
- Mauricio Bonet as Darío
- Lourdes Canale as Esther and Rosita's friend
- Héctor Cruz as Hugo
- Anabel Gutiérrez as Rosita
- Jaime Lozano as Zúñiga
- María Marcela as Sonia
- Tere Mondragón as Esther and Rosita's friend
- Mary Carmen Vela as Esther and Rosita's friend
- Juan Verduzco as Aurelio
- Maria Fernanda Sasián as Triana
- Andrés Garza as Santiago
- Don Lorenzo de Rodas as Agustín
- Alfonso Iturralde as José María
- Adriana Roel as Blanca
- Claudio Báez as Gutiérrez
- David Ostrosky as Jaime
- Polo Ortín as Nicky
- Manuel Landeta as Ramiro
- Yolanda Ventura as Macarena
- Tiaré Scanda as Aurora
- Julio Bracho as Iker
- Eduardo Liñán as Benítez
- Victor Noriega as Gabriel
