= Mi amor sin tiempo =

- Genre: Telenovela
- Based on: Tres mujeres by Martha Carrillo & Cristina García
- Developed by: Martha Carrillo; Cristina García
- Directed by: Nelinho Acosta; Luis Eduardo Reyes
- Starring: Karla Esquivel; Andrés Baida; Leticia Calderón; Juana Arias; Mane de la Parra; Karyme Lozano; Alejandro Camacho; Michael Ronda
- Theme music composer: José Antonio Farías
- Opening theme: "Mi amor sin tiempo" by Shaila Dúrcal
- Composer: Xavier Asali
- Country of origin: Mexico
- Original language: Spanish
- No. of seasons: 1
- No. of episodes: 80

Production
- Executive producer: Carlos Moreno
- Producer: Hilda Santaella Hernández
- Editors: Alfredo Sánchez Díaz; Daniel Rentería Carmona; Viridiana Murillo Barroso
- Camera setup: Multi-camera
- Production company: TelevisaUnivision

Original release
- Network: Las Estrellas
- Release: 15 July – 1 November 2024

Mi amor sin tiempo (English title: Boundless Love) is a Mexican telenovela produced by Carlos Moreno for TelevisaUnivision. Developed by Martha Carrillo and Cristina García, it is based on their own 1999 telenovela Tres mujeres. The series stars Leticia Calderón, Karla Esquivel and Juana Arias. It aired on Las Estrellas from 15 July 2024 to 1 November 2024.

== Plot ==
The plot follows the lives of three women belonging to the same family who, being in different stages of life, face a very similar love situation. All three are in seemingly stable relationships, but when true love appears in their lives it will lead them to challenge themselves and do things they never imagined, even going against the norms of the society they belong to.

== Cast ==
- Karla Esquivel as Fátima
- Andrés Baida as Sebastián
- Leticia Calderón as Greta
- Juana Arias as Bárbara
- Mane de la Parra as Daniel
- Karyme Lozano as Renata
- Alejandro Camacho as Federico
- Michael Ronda as Adrián
- Yolanda Ventura as Lucía
- Luz María Jerez as Ana
- Alma Delfina as Jesusa
- Eric del Castillo as Álvaro
- Federico Ayos as Pablo
- Mauricio Abularach as Mario
- Damiana Bej as Triana
- Andrea de Fátima as Brenda
- Denia Agalianu as Carla
- Alejandra Abreu as Verania
- Paola Toyos as Genoveva
- Julia Argüelles as Carolina
- Rafaella Gavira Bigorra as Macarena
- Claudia Zepeda as Maricruz
- Raquel Morell as Maggie
- Laura Luz as Carmen
- María Marcela as Sara
- Roberto Mateos as José
- Ian Andrade as Remigio
- José Elías Moreno as Gonzalo
- Michel Duval as Claudio Altamirano
- Zoraida Gómez as Gisela

== Production ==
In December 2023, it was reported that Carlos Moreno would be producing a remake of Tres mujeres. In April 2024, Mi amor sin tiempo was announced as the title of the telenovela. On 2 May 2024, Leticia Calderón was confirmed as one of the lead roles. Filming of the telenovela began on 6 May 2024. A week later, a blessing ceremony was held at which the rest of the cast was announced.

== Episodes ==
No.	Title	Original release date	Mexico viewers (millions)
1	"Las cosas se harán a mi modo"	15 July 2024 (Note: Premiered early online through Las Estrellas website on 12 July 2024.)	2.14
Adrián and Fátima celebrate their engagement, but she fears that he is incapable of satisfying her in intimacy. Brenda complains to Adrián for not telling her that he would be engaged to Fátima, because despite agreeing to be his lover, she needs to be aware of the situation. Bárbara suffers when she realizes that she is not pregnant and decides to look for the next option, since she wants to have another child no matter what. Greta tries to impose her demands on Fátima's wedding, but she puts a stop to it by making it clear that it is not what she envisioned all along. Triana gets evidence that Adrián is unfaithful to Fátima, but he confronts her to make her retract herself.
2	"¿Eres feliz en tu matrimonio?"	16 July 2024	1.94
Adrián manages to make Fátima believe that his relationship with Brenda is nothing more than a close relationship between work colleagues. Federico confesses to Sebastián how sorry he feels for sending him to boarding school at a time when he needed his affection the most. Triana learns that Adrián lied to Fátima when he told her that Brenda's father was hospitalized, leading to more suspicions of his infidelity. Mario confesses to Bárbara his suspicions that she only wants to get pregnant to try to save their marriage. Fátima decides in favor of her own happiness and returns her engagement ring to Adrián.
3	"Tú vives a costa mía"	17 July 2024	2.36
Greta learns that Fátima canceled her engagement to Adrián and forces her to reconcile, as she does not intend to back out in front of all her friends. Fátima regrets having distrusted Adrián and looks for him ready to apologize for her mistrust. Greta reminds Gonzalo that he was only able to open his business thanks to her father's generous inheritance, so she is the one who sets the rules of the house. Fátima visits Adrián in his office and meets Brenda. Sebastián visits Renata's gallery and upon meeting Fátima, is struck by her beauty and the beauty of her art.
4	"Eres una frígida"	18 July 2024	2.03
Sebastián makes Fátima proud by filling her art with compliments and asks for a chance to see her again. Gonzalo confesses to Ana his intentions to divorce Greta after Fátima's wedding and Ana sees it as a reason to celebrate. Fátima tries to explain to Adrián his performance problem in bed and he explodes as he feels humiliated by his fiancée. After seeing Adrián's reaction, Fátima questions whether she should get married or call off the wedding. Adrián tries to prove to Fátima that there is nothing wrong with him, but Sebastián arrives at the gallery just in time to defend her.
5	"La vida te dio otra oportunidad"	19 July 2024	2.12
Adrián feels betrayed when he sees that Fátima defends Sebastián from his attacks to avoid more problems at work. Gonzalo warns Pablo that he will have to start working to pay for his studies unless he attends therapy to end his addiction. Pablo remembers the accident in which he was involved and thanks Greta for having prevented him from paying the consequences of his crime. Sebastián seeks Verania's opinion on whether to accept or reject his father's job offer. Adrián looks forward to his appointment as the company's new vice president, but is furious when he learns that Sebastien stole his position.
6	"¿De qué lado estas, Fátima?"	22 July 2024	2.36
Sebsatián is welcomed by everyone in the company except Adrián, who claims that he only got the job because he is the owner's son. Adrián vents his fury in Fátima's face, saying that the man he had problems with is Sebsatián, Federico's son, who came to take the vice-president's job from him. Verania regrets having rejected the insinuations of the client she visited, since he is a very influential man and it will be almost impossible for her to recover her career as a model. Greta confronts Pablo about the money stolen from her safe, making it clear that there would be serious consequences if he turns out to be the thief. Upon his arrival in New York, Sebsatián looks for Verania to make her a tempting job offer in Mexico, but he is surprised to see her kissing her agent.
7	"¿Una mujer insatisfecha?"	23 July 2024	2.36
Despite his problems with Bárbara, Mario refuses to give in to Erick's pressure to get involved with another woman. Sebastián tells Verania that he withdrew the job offer that could have given her back her career as a professional model. Adrián makes a jealous scene when he sees the friendship between Fátima and Daniel and she puts the wedding on hold until they can resolve their relationship problems. Seeing Fátima's indecision, Triana confesses the way Brenda and Adrián refer to her, revealing intimate details.
8	"Vete en mi espejo"	24 July 2024	2.16
Gonzalo defends Fátima from Greta for her decision to cancel her engagement, assuring her that he does not wish her a marriage like his. Adrián throws his engagement to Fátima in Sebastián's face, but Triana makes it clear to him that their wedding has already been called off. Bárbara complains to Mario that his job only delays her plans to get pregnant, and he makes it clear that without his hard work, they would never be able to afford their lifestyle. Sebastián runs into Fátima at the same bookstore and they are both excited to see each other again; Sebastián takes the courage to invite her for coffee.
9	"¡Desaprovechaste tu oportunidad!"	25 July 2024	2.11
Gonzalo punishes Pablo for being expelled from college, but he refuses to admit his guilt and chooses to look for another home rather than be forced to work. After his date with Fátima, Sebastián proves to be the gentleman she expected him to be. Fátima tries to make Pablo think again about his mistakes to prevent him from ruining his future. Maca sees her parents arguing again and suffers a breakdown for fear that they might get divorced.
10	"No hay hombre perfecto"	26 July 2024	1.86
Brenda shows her admiration for Sebastián's work in front of Adrián and he takes it as a betrayal, increasing his resentment towards him. Pablo finds a goldsmith willing to buy his mother's jewelry and then replace it with fake ones. Triana fulfills Fátima's order and returns Adrián's engagement ring and takes the opportunity to mock him about it. Sebastián saves Fátima from an accident and they share a kiss.
11	"No quiero nada de ti"	29 July 2024	2.14
Bárbara and Daniel criticize their different lifestyles between the countryside and the city. Adrián's and Fátima confess to Triana all about the kiss they shared and admit that they felt a feeling of love they had never experienced before. Sebastián demonstrates his honesty by refusing a company car, regardless of the fact that it is an employee benefit. Gonzalo overhears Adrián trying to force Fátima to marry him in exchange for his silence about her miscarriage and confronts him, causing him a pain in his chest that leaves him down.
12	"Estaba dispuesta a tener a mi hijo"	30 July 2024	2.19
Bárbara complains to Fátima for calling off her engagement to Adrián to get involved with Sebastián, assuring that she would never do such a thing. Adrián turns Greta against Fátima by revealing to her that he was willing to marry her daughter despite having an abortion; Fátima assures her mother that it was a miscarriage and that Adrián is manipulating the situation. Bárbara finds Daniel playing with Maca and is upset to see him near her daughter. Adrián confesses to Greta that he is afraid of seeing Fátima involved with a deadbeat like Sebastián.
13	"Tengo cinco días de retraso"	31 July 2024	2.10
Mario is forced to intercede in the problems between Bárbara and Daniel in order to keep the house in harmony. Federico blames himself for Greta's decision and remembers how she lost his love forever. Fátima receives a warning that she might be expecting Adrián's child and fears what might become of her life if it were true. Adrián demands that Brenda seduce Sebastián to keep him under surveillance at the company and away from Fátima.
14	"La duda hace más daño que la razón"	1 August 2024	1.98
Greta complains to Fátima for getting together with Sebastián and Fátima threatens to leave the house if she continues to try to control her life. Greta tries to convince Gonzalo not to divorce her by threatening to go public with his alleged past infidelity. Verania looks for Sebastián in his office, but finds Adrián willing to help her as long as she keeps him away from Fátima. Fátima and Sebastián end up talking about their past relationships and he confesses to her that he feels a much greater love with her than the one he experienced with Verania.
15	"No puedo vivir sin ti"	2 August 2024	1.83
Adrián promises Verania to do whatever it takes for her to win back Sebastián. Bárbara laments with the news that the in vitro fertilization could not succeed, Daniel notices and runs to comfort her. Fátima assures that Sebastián lied to her when he said he had separated from Verania and regrets having thought she could be happy with him.
16	"Loca de amor"	5 August 2024	2.02
Verania tells Adrián that thanks to a previous contract, Sebastián cannot be in Mexico for more than six months. Greta learns that Maggie is badmouthing her behind her back and makes sure everyone knows the real reason why Fátima canceled her engagement. Sebastián decides to take a step forward in his relationship with Fátima and asks her to be his girlfriend. Adrián tries to ruin Fátima's happiness by confessing that Sebastián will only be in the country for a short time, a secret that only Verania could have told him.
17	"Los planes cambian"	6 August 2024	2.11
Fátima offers her support to Bárbara in dealing with her miscarriages, but Bárbara rejects her, assuring that she does have Mario's support. Mario confesses that he has not discarded the idea of getting a divorce, as he assures that he would not have the patience to stay in a broken marriage. Sebastián objects to Verania becoming the international image of the company, knowing that it is an attempt by Adrián to sabotage his relationship with Fátima. Adrián decides to blackmail Fátima when he learns that she is already Sebastián's girlfriend and purposely crashes his car.
18	"Aléjate de Fátima"	7 August 2024	2.26
Gonzalo is reunited with his ex-girlfriend Carmen, who happens to be the owner of the restaurant where he always goes to eat with Ana. Genoveva warns Renata that José, her ex-husband has been released from prison and fears that he will carry out his threat to take revenge on her. Greta confronts Sebastián and warns him that she will never accept him as Fátima's boyfriend. Fátima recognizes Brenda and she confirms that she has been Adrián's lover since before he met her.
19	"Es hora de enterrar el pasado"	8 August 2024	1.93
Bárbara acknowledges her mistake in not having believed Fátima's word and promises to be a better sister to her. Álvaro advises Daniel not to let his painful past tarnish his future. Gonzalo finds Federico's ring and confronts Greta for keeping his memory alive throughout their marriage. Adrián urgently needs a blood donor and Sebastián turns out to be the only one compatible with him.
20	"Haces magia en mi vida"	9 August 2024	1.70
Bárbara is surprised to realize that she is becoming her mother by reacting the same way Greta did when Maca asked her for a pet. Renata confesses to Fátima the real reason for her concern and tells her how she sent her ex-husband to jail. Fátima and Sebastián recognize that their feelings go beyond anything they have ever felt before and decide to consummate their love. Adrián wakes up and threatens Maggie that he will refuse all treatment unless Fátima visits him.
21	"Antes eras divertida"	12 August 2024	2.10
Fátima explains to Adrián that thanks to Brenda's confession, she never wants to see him again in her life. Bárbara tries to denigrate Maricruz and everyone at the ranch by pointing out the different social classes they belong to. Federico warns Adrián that he pointed out Sebastián as responsible for his advertising campaign so that he can dedicate himself to healing in peace. Sebastián meets Carolina, the new model for his campaign and she makes her interest so evident that even Triana notices this.
22	"¿Por qué eres tan amargada?"	13 August 2024	2.00
Verania tries to make Fátima doubt Sebastián by warning her that he is not faithful. Renata realizes that someone is following her and confesses to Fátima her helplessness against José's revenge. Carolina confesses that Sebastián has interested her like no man before and is willing to do anything to make him hers. Daniel confronts Bárbara to put a stop to the terrible attitude with which she handles herself in front of everyone around her.
23	"Promesas que no se cumplieron"	14 August 2024	2.20
After their argument, Daniel tries to change Bárbara's mood by asking her for a smile. Bárbara looks for Mario in his room in Guadalajara, but a mysterious woman answers the call. Pablo finds Fátima with Sebastián and tries to warn him of the future that awaits him by being at his sister's side, mocking her misfortune. Bárbara regrets realizing that her marriage to Mario did not turn out to be the happiness they promised each other at the altar.
24	"El corazón no avisa"	15 August 2024	2.20
Gonzalo discovers that Pablo not only lied to him about his trip but also committed fraud against the company and suffers a heart attack. Remigio invites Maca to climb a tree, but being inexperienced she suffers a terrible fall. Fátima confronts Pablo for having criticized her moments after having committed the fraud that caused Gonzalo's heart attack. Federico visits Fátima to offer his support and is shocked to realize that her mother is Greta.
25	"Una segunda oportunidad"	16 August 2024	2.00
Fátima learns that Pablo was arrested for drunk driving and refuses to help him so that he understands the consequences of his actions. Greta surprises everyone by showing great interest in getting to know Sebastián better after finding out that he is Federico's son. Bárbara thanks Daniel for his efforts by inviting him to sleep at her house and he discovers a new side of her. Ana notices Greta's interest in Federico and demands respect for Gonzalo.
26	"Culpable de nuestra desgracia"	19 August 2024	1.90
Greta forces Ana to keep her secret, assuring that if she tells Gonzalo, it could cause a second heart attack. Adrián agrees to put the apartment where he lives in Brenda's name, but with a secret clause that ensures a betrayal. Greta is forced to lie to Federico and assures him that Gonzalo was the one who ordered Jesusa to lie to him about her supposed death.
27	"Tus mentiras tienen doble intención"	20 August 2024	1.80
Jesusa is sure that Greta lied to Federico and somehow, her lie is related to her sudden trip to Houston with Gonzalo. Mario confesses to Daniel how sorry he is for his infidelity and his doubts about whether or not to tell Bárbara the truth. Fátima complains to Pablo for helping Adrián infiltrate the house; Greta surprises everyone by agreeing with her. Carmen visits Gonzalo in the hospital and meets Greta, who immediately realizes the chemistry between the two.
28	"La mujer que más he odiado"	21 August 2024	2.10
Federico meets with Greta to finish their pending conversation and takes the opportunity to confess that not even her supposed death made him stop loving her. Federico confesses to Sebastián the relationship he had with Greta and begs him not to say anything to Fátima for fear of giving Gonzalo another heart attack. Sebastián confesses to Greta that he is aware of her secret and the contempt he feels for her, he warns her that if she does not reveal her secret to Fátima, he will have to tell her himself.
29	"Una mujer prohibida"	22 August 2024	1.90
Seeing Pablo's unwillingness to settle things, Gonzalo demands that he find a place to live, since he will no longer be welcome in his house; Greta is forced to support him. Sebastián warns Fátima, as she did with Carolina, that Diego has an interest in her beyond professional matters. Maricruz warns Bárbara that she will not give up until Daniel is only hers. Mario tries to get closer to Bárbara in intimacy, but she rejects him, demonstrating more than ever her emotional distance.
30	"Greta no es lo que aparenta"	23 August 2024	2.00
Jackie threatens Mario with sending Bárbara the intimate video she recorded with him unless he pays her what she wants for her silence. Triana overhears Federico confess that he is in love with Greta, letting her understand that he is the ex-boyfriend she could never forget. Fátima helps Greta look for Gonzalo's passport and accidentally finds Federico's letter, the same one she remembers seeing during her childhood.
31	"Te quiero con toda mi alma"	26 August 2024	1.90
Sebastián doubts whether his love for Fátima is strong enough to overcome the obstacles they will have to face, such as Greta's lies about her past. Bárbara suffers an accident on horseback and Daniel, refusing to relive the loss of María, confesses his love to her to make her react and they kiss. Carolina informs Sebastián that she was a victim of crime, so she must travel immediately and the advertising campaign must be postponed. Gonzalo ends his hope of reconciling with Greta when he learns that she only agreed to travel to Houston to undergo a series of medical treatments.
32	"Deja que este amor muera"	27 August 2024	2.10
Daniel kisses Bárbara again to force her to admit her feelings for him, but she is offended and slaps him. Thanks to Adrián's plan, Sebastián is forced to ask Verania to be the new image of the campaign, since no one else is available to go to the shoot. Ana confronts Federico to respect Gonzalo and Renata by staying away from Greta forever. Bárbara implies to Daniel that she feels the same for him, but begs him to forget her, since their love is impossible.
33	"Tengo miedo de perderte"	28 August 2024	2.00
Fátima becomes jealous when she learns that Sebastián had to hire Verania as the new image of the campaign. Bárbara confesses to Fátima that she is reconsidering her marriage to Mario, as she thinks the love is gone. Federico fears that Renata is aware of his relationship with Greta and that he himself is to blame for her discomfort.
34	"Nuestro amor es fuego"	29 August 2024	1.90
Daniel saves Bárbara from the rain and when she finds herself locked up with him, she can no longer keep silent about the love she feels. Federico confesses to Renata that Greta reappeared in his life and despite the time, he still loves her. Carolina takes advantage of Sebastián's last visit to confess her feelings for him since the moment they met. Pablo surprises everyone in the house with the news that he married Carla on the sly.
35	"Cometiste el peor error de tu vida"	30 August 2024	1.83
Despite the peace at the ranch, Lucía realizes that the relationship between Daniel and Bárbara has changed drastically from one moment to the next. Verania interrupts a video call between Sebastián and Fátima, causing Fátima's jealousy. Gonzalo tries to make Carla understand the mistake she made by marrying Pablo. Greta tries to buy Carla to stay away from Pablo and warns her that sooner or later, she will succeed in separating them.
36	"Hagan bien las cosas"	2 September 2024	2.01
Fátima insists on knowing the reason why Bárbara wants to divorce Mario and is surprised to learn that she fell in love with Daniel. Maricruz complains to Daniel for allowing Bárbara to trick him and threatens to tell his grandfather everything so that he will put an end to their affair. Fátima advises Bárbara to end her relationship with Daniel so she can focus on divorcing Mario before thinking about the future. Gonzalo is determined to take the opportunity life has given him to end his marriage and dedicate himself to his own happiness.
37	"Nuestro amor tuvo consecuencias"	3 September 2024	2.09
Lucía asks Bárbara to leave the ranch, as she is no longer willing to keep quiet about her affair with Daniel. Maricruz gets Mario's phone number to warn him about Barbara's infidelity. Diego celebrates Fátima's success and he takes the opportunity to let her know of his love and that he is willing to wait for her to make her happy. Greta confesses to Federico the real reason why she had to marry Gonzalo despite not loving him.
38	"Hay de errores a errores"	4 September 2024	2.06
Bárbara tries to put a stop to Maricruz's teasing for being with Daniel, but Maricruz proves to her that she is willing to do anything to separate them. Adrián sends Fátima the altered photos of Sebastián with Verania to make them break up. Faced with Maricruz's threats, Bárbara decides to return to the capital to confront Mario and tell him that she is in love with Daniel. Maca looks for Bárbara to send a letter to the city, but finds her making out with Daniel.
39	"¿Crees que me quedaré sola?"	5 September 2024	N/A
Gonzalo and Carmen are caught celebrating the future they are planning together. Greta agrees to divorce Gonzalo and criticizes his plan to rebuild his life with Carmen. Álvaro cannot tolerate that Daniel and Bárbara are still seeing each other on the sly and demands that his grandson leave the ranch. Greta prevents Gonzalo from meeting Federico by confessing that she has seen fooling him since she agreed to marry him.
40	"La muerte de Gonzalo"	6 September 2024	1.99
Greta tells Federico that she is in the hospital and reveals everything about Gonzalo's infidelity, not caring that he has little time left to live. Greta fears that Gonzalo has woken up, as she is sure that he will use the time he has left to reveal to Bárbara that she is not his daughter. Pablo agrees to visit Gonzalo despite his fear of his complaints, but is surprised to discover his father's love. Fátima, Pablo and Bárbara meet in Gonzalo's room to give him one last token of their love before he passes away.
41	"Las apariencias engañan"	9 September 2024	1.91
Greta is grateful for Gonzalo's death, because now she will be able to fight for her happiness with Federico without raising any suspicions about her morals. Carmen arrives at Gonzalo's funeral and Greta confronts her for her brazenness in assuring that Gonzalo was unfaithful with her. Mario confesses to Daniel that he became jealous of him when he saw the affection with which Bárbara received him during the funeral. Pablo forces Greta to tell him which of his sisters is not Gonzalo's daughter and she manipulates the facts so as not to lose her son's respect.
42	"Hay algo que nos une y nos separa"	10 September 2024	1.90
Sebastián is forced to end his relationship with Fátima so as not to hurt her by revealing the love that existed between their parents. Despite Mario's pleas, Bárbara makes it clear to him that their marriage was over before his infidelity. Greta reveals to Fátima her past with Federico and tries to tarnish Gonzalo's memory, but she refuses to believe everything her mother says. Fátima suspects that her mother's secret goes beyond what she told her and vows not to rest until she discovers the truth.
43	"No renuncies a tus sueños"	11 September 2024	1.89
Maca begs Maricruz to get back together with Daniel so that Bárbara can love her and Mario again. Bárbara suddenly faints and the doctor asks her for a series of tests, as she could be expecting a baby. Sebastián learns that someone has changed the deadline for his campaign, a mistake that could mean millions in losses for the company. Fátima takes her father's place in the factory and promises to do everything in her power to save it from imminent bankruptcy.
44	"Somos libres para amarnos"	12 September 2024	1.85
Bárbara confirms that she is pregnant, but prays to God that it is not true, because she assures that it is the worst time of her life to be pregnant. Renata goes to Federico's house to confirm if the accusations that he met with Greta are true. Lucía begs Bárbara to see her pregnancy as a sign to get her life back on track and get away from Daniel, but Maca interrupts them when she learns she will have a baby brother. Ana assures Greta that someday she will discover the truth behind all her secrets to clear Gonzalo's name.
45	"¿En qué te fallé?"	13 September 2024	1.72
Claudio recognizes Fátima's beauty and investigates her to find out the best way to win her heart. Fátima laments the absence of Gonzalo and Sebastián in her life and decides to focus on her art to get the pain out. Daniel confesses to Mario that he and Bárbara are in love and Daniel attacks him for betraying his trust and confronts Bárbara for being unfaithful. Fátima looks for Sebastián desperate to have a clear explanation as to why he broke up with her, or she will have to move on with her life.
46	"Espero contar con tu lealtad"	16 September 2024	1.98
Fátima insists that Greta tell her the terrible truth about why Sebastián ended their relationship, but Greta tries to get her to take her side by throwing in her face that she is her mother. Verania brags to Fátima that Sebastián is in New York preparing the house where they will live together. Greta gets fed up with Jesusa's interference in her life and decides to fire her once and for all. Federico asks Renata for the name of her ex-husband to have him investigated, but is shocked to learn that it is his friend, José.
47	"Perdóname, bebé"	17 September 2024	1.96
Bárbara visits the doctor to confirm her pregnancy and clarify her doubts regarding paternity tests. Fátima and Sebastián meet at the airport and she warns him that it could be too late when he decides to explain why he ended their relationship. Renata decides to meet with José to put an end once and for all to his threats to hurt her loved ones. Bárbara visits a clinic to terminate her pregnancy.
48	"Te amé con locura"	18 September 2024	2.08
Bárbara assures Greta that she will divorce Mario, as she refuses to follow in her footsteps and be in a loveless marriage. Fátima and Sebastián confess to each other the pain of their separation, but she confirms that she should not be with him when she sees Carolina arrive at his apartment. Verania visits Sebastián and is furious when she realizes that Carolina arrived before her to offer her affection. Greta begs for Federico's love, but he rejects her and she assures him that he has made an enemy thanks to his humiliation.
49	"Descubrí tu juego"	19 September 2024	1.99
Greta hires the services of a hacker to get rid of all the evidence Carla might have against her. Fátima discovers that Verania is sharing an apartment with Adrián and realizes that all this time, the two of them have been conspiring against her. Sebastián complains to Brenda for having changed his documents to try to sabotage his campaign without him realizing it. Federico makes sure that Brenda is arrested and brought to trial for her treason against the company.
50	"En la cárcel no hay boda"	20 September 2024	1.96
Fátima and Sebastián accidentally meet in a restaurant while each celebrates the success of their careers. Fátima rejects Sebastián making it clear to him that she no longer wants anything to do with him. Fátima asks Pablo to try to support Bárbara but he refuses, as he no longer sees her as his sister. Adrián surprises everyone in the office by appearing before Federico to acknowledge his guilt in Brenda's crimes.
51	"Quiero que me heredes en vida"	23 September 2024	2.28
Brenda confesses to Verania that for some time she has been gathering evidence that Adrián forced her to commit the crimes for which she could be imprisoned. Daniel asks Mario to stop forcing Bárbara to stay by his side, as he knows that their marriage has been over for a long time. Claudio offers to be one of the partners of the factory and invest a sum of millions in order to see Fátima happy. Fátima overhears Pablo blackmailing Greta with revealing the secret that one of his sisters is not really Gonzalo's daughter.
52	"Nuestro amor es más fuerte que la sangre"	24 September 2024	1.98
Faced with Greta's silence, Fátima forces Pablo to tell her everything he knows about Greta and Federico's relationship. Despite Sebastián's suspicions, Fátima refuses to believe that her mother is capable of inventing such lies about Bárbara's biological father. Carolina confronts Fátima to find out if she plans to get back together with Sebastián or if she has a free path to fall in love with him. Fátima reveals to Bárbara that Federico could be her biological father and Bárbara confirms it by remembering Gonzalo's last words before he died.
53	"Adiós, Sebastián"	25 September 2024	1.95
Greta makes her daughters believe that she had nothing to do with what Jesusa did to keep her away from Federico. Sebastián refuses to accept any agreement to make Brenda pay for her crimes, as he assures her that she will soon turn Adrián in. Fátima is disappointed when she realizes that Sebastián's hatred for Greta was much stronger than their love for each other and decides to put an end to their relationship. Daniel tries to run away from his problems when he disappoints Bárbara at the worst moment of her life, but ends up suffering a horseback riding accident.
54	"¡Ya no eres nadie en mi vida!"	26 September 2024	2.00
Renata is forced to share with Fátima her reasons for believing that Greta lied to her about Bárbara's father. Bárbara learns that Daniel suffered an accident and quickly rushes to the ranch; Maca feels that she abandoned her to be reunited with him. While comforting Pablo, Greta remembers how she manipulated everything to make her son disappointed in Carla. Maricruz demands that Bárbara stay away from Daniel, but seeing her mockery, she decides to put a curse on her and the baby she is expecting.
55	"Dudo de todo mundo"	27 September 2024	2.13
Greta accepts Federico's invitation without imagining that it would be an ambush to force her to tell the truth about her past. Mario forces Maca to choose which of her parents she prefers to live with, since Bárbara will no longer live at home. Pablo visits Gonzalo's crypt to confess how sorry he is for not being able to be the man he had hoped he would be. Triana confesses to Sebastián that for the moment, Fátima's main concern is not being able to fulfill Gonzalo's dream of the transformation of the factory.
56	"Siempre logro lo que quiero"	30 September 2024	2.21
Pablo realizes that his sisters share the same doubts as he does about Greta's secret and decide to join forces to investigate everything on their own. Fátima tries to distract herself with Claudio by talking about her personal life and her love life. Carolina thanks Sebastián for defending her from Verania's attacks, but for the first time she notices him willing to open his heart. Sebastián seeks a private meeting with Claudio to offer himself as the partner needed to move the Uriarte family's factory forward.
57	"¿Vas a reconocer a Bárbara?"	1 October 2024	1.76
Ana asks Renata for help, assuring that only by working together can they discover the truth that Greta is hiding. Fátima and Bárbara realize that Pablo is on the verge of alcoholism and beg Greta to do something about it to save his life. Greta listens to Rosa María's complaints and rushes to defend Bárbara from anyone who dares to speak ill of her family. Federico visits Greta to acknowledge his mistake in the hope that she will forgive him to revive their love.
58	"¡Fue Adrián!"	2 October 2024	2.21
Greta plans her future with Federico and decides it would be best to get rid of her children to avoid criticism for breaking the mourning. Sebastián confirms that Adrián was the one who planned all the attacks against him and confronts him to make him pay for all his crimes. Bárbara feels a cramp that horrifies her, as it could mean the end of her pregnancy. Fátima visits Adrián to confront him for his crimes, but he gets tired of her constant rejection and decides to take her by force.
59	"Te vas a pudrir en la cárcel"	3 October 2024	2.25
Adrián complains to Verania for betraying him with Sebastián and makes sure that she can never forget that they once worked together. Sebastián learns that Adrián tried to hurt Fátima and runs to her to show his support. Brenda discovers that she was yet another victim of Adrián's deceptions and seeks out Sebastián willing to turn over all the evidence she has against him. Sebastián confronts Adrian willing to make him pay for hurting Fátima and Verania.
60	"Entre la vida y la muerte"	4 October 2024	2.10
Fátima and Sebastián admit that they still love each other, but they could not get back together until they resolve their doubts about Greta. Verania tells Sebastián that he is the only thing she has in her life to try to keep him by her side. Greta warns Fátima that she is resuming her relationship with Federico and they have even talked about getting married. Adrián assures the police that Sebastián is the only one responsible for the attack that put his life at risk.
61	"La muerte de Adrián"	7 October 2024	2.07
Daniel decides to fire Maricruz from the ranch for having lost his trust in her after discovering that she interfered in his search for a job in the city. Fátima tries to convince Adrián to change his statement against Sebastián, but he dies without regretting his statement. Fátima feels guilty for having provoked Adrián's hatred for Sebastián, which eventually led him to his death. Fátima declares Adrián's last words, but the police agent takes it as if she also blames Sebastián for the attack.
62	"¿Crees que soy inocente?"	8 October 2024	2.27
Maca forces Mario to swear that he will never have a girlfriend, as she assures him that this is the only way they can be happy again. Thanks to Adrián's last words, Fátima begins to doubt Sebastián's innocence, causing more distance between the two of them. Fátima seeks to resolve with Claudio her doubts regarding Sebastián's innocence, but Claudio advises her regarding his own interests. Brenda assures the authorities that it was Sebastián who threatened Adrián the day he was fired from the company.
63	"No me busques más"	9 October 2024	2.02
Fátima visits Sebastián in the hope that he will forgive her for having doubted his innocence. Brenda breaks into Adrián's apartment to get her things back and get away from her crime. Federico reaches his limit with Greta's obsession and demands that she leave him alone once and for all. Thanks to Claudio, Fátima realizes that among the suspects in Adrián's death, Brenda is the only person who fits the forensic description of the attacker.
64	"Un acto de amor"	10 October 2024	N/A
Seeing Maca's pain at having to testify before the judge, Bárbara decides to put an end to the trial, sacrificing her happiness for that of her daughter. José takes advantage of the fact that Sebastián is his new prison mate and attacks him to take revenge on him and Federico. Thanks to Fátima, the police manage to arrest Brenda to make her pay for Adrián's death. Daniel offers Bárbara the option of moving to town with him to start a new life together.
65	"Yo amo a Sebastián"	11 October 2024	2.07
Before Sebastián is released from prison, José takes his revenge for having separated him from Renata. Brenda receives the news that she will never walk again and will soon be sent to prison. Triana reveals to Sebastián the deeds Fátima did in order to clear his name. Mario and Bárbara meet to receive the definitive proof of who is the father of the child she is expecting.
66	"Mi labor de madre se acabó"	14 October 2024	2.18
Fátima confirms that Greta was the one who gave Gonzalo a heart attack with the news that Bárbara is Federico's daughter. Greta disowns Pablo and demands that he leave the house immediately for having dared to steal from his own mother. Fátima regrets having defended Greta's lies, the same lies that separated her from Sebastián. Brenda receives the news that she could be sentenced to 20 years in prison for all the crimes she is accused of.
67	"Ya no quiero seguir viviendo"	15 October 2024	2.11
Sebastián decides to put in Fátima's name his part of the shares he bought for the restructuring of the plastics factory; Claudio questions him about his feelings. Feeling abandoned by his entire family and completely drunk, Pablo tries to put an end to his pain. Greta attacks Renata as a warning to end any kind of relationship with Federico. Faced with Fátima and Bárbara's demands, Pablo finally reacts and agrees to go to rehab to deal with his addiction.
68	"La peor de las mujeres"	16 October 2024	2.37
Bárbara and Federico receive the results of the DNA test they ordered to check if they are really father and daughter. Sebastián arrives at the hospital to help Fátima overcome the pain of discovering her mother's lies. Fátima learns that Greta went crazy after Federico's visit and fears that she might do something to hurt herself. Fátima, Bárbara and Pablo confront Greta for having caused Gonzalo's death because of her selfishness.
69	"Estoy planeando mi fuga"	17 October 2024	2.06
José calls Greta from jail and she sees it as the perfect opportunity to get revenge on Renata and get Federico back. While Bárbara celebrates her first day living with Daniel, Maricruz turns the town against her to force them to separate. Gisela warns Mario that by separating Maca from Bárbara he is also risking his future, because if he decides to rebuild his life, his daughter could see it as a betrayal. Fátima and Sebastián agree to move on with their lives and if they continue to love each other when they both return, they will undoubtedly get married.
70	"No pospongas tu vida"	18 October 2024	1.90
Mario decides to put aside the pain he feels so that he can begin to heal his life and not live full of resentment and hatred. Greta informs Claudio and Fátima of her decision to sell her shares in the factory in order to spend her fortune instead of passing it on to her children. Overwhelmed by the problems facing her family, Fátima considers canceling her trip to Spain so that she can keep an eye on everyone. Fátima is suspicious of the anonymous investor's intentions and demands to meet him before he buys Greta's shares or she will be forced to cancel the deal.
71	"Hasta pronto"	21 October 2024	2.32
Federico and Sebastián reveal that they have been the anonymous investors who have been interested in reviving Gonzalo's dream. Claudio meets Carolina and sees her as the perfect accomplice to separate Fátima and Sebastián for good. Fátima and Sebastián have one last kiss before beginning the next chapter of their respective lives. Maricruz orders a robbery at Bárbara's house that could put her life and that of the baby she is expecting at risk.
72	"Conozco tu mal corazón"	22 October 2024	2.19
Maca learns that Mario is dating Gisela and feels betrayed for breaking his promise that he would never have a girlfriend. Despite all the rejections, Greta keeps assuring her friends that she will soon walk down the aisle with Federico. Fátima and Sebastián realize how difficult it is to keep in touch during their separation, so they decide to break off all contact. Claudio visits Fátima in Madrid to confess his love and steals a kiss.
73	"El que persevera, alcanza"	23 October 2024	2.31
Carolina surprises Sebastián by being the only one to travel to Detroit to celebrate his birthday. Bárbara regrets when she realizes that in addition to her problems during pregnancy, her baby will be born ill. Claudio shocks Fátima by giving her a valuable piece of jewelry, which she rejects to avoid any misunderstandings. Claudio takes advantage of Carolina's trip to make Fátima disappointed in Sebastián; Carolina does the same.
74	"La vida compensa"	24 October 2024	2.25
The lieutenant confirms that Maricruz was the one who organized the robbery at Bárbara's house to scare her away from town. Now that Bárbara has returned to Mario's house, Maca insists that she forget about Daniel and get back together with Mario to become a family again. Greta looks for Fátima to complain to her for humiliating her by referring to Renata as a mother. Mario recognizes that thanks to Gisela's support he has been able to become a better man and tests her feelings with a kiss.
75	"¿Qué tiene mi bebé?"	25 October 2024	2.18
Bárbara and Daniel are shocked to discover that their son will be born with a congenital disease. Federico makes a romantic proposal to Renata to take the next step in their relationship. José manages to manage to get out of jail and get his revenge thanks to Greta's support. Sebastián and Fátima meet at the airport to discover that they will both be staying much sooner than expected.
76	"Lo que hace uno por amor"	28 October 2024	N/A
Fátima rejects Claudio when she realizes that all his favors are intended to buy her and control her life. Pablo gets out of rehab and asks Federico for a chance to earn his own money and eventually buy his share of the family business. Fátima convinces Maca to accept Daniel as Bárbara's boyfriend in order to leave the grudge behind and enjoy her new family. Greta realizes José's true plan for revenge and acts impulsively to save Federico's life.
77	"La muerte de Greta"	29 October 2024	2.24
Renata manages to get away from José and he ends up being caught by Federico's security personnel. Sebastián arrives at the hospital to offer comfort to Fátima, frustrating Claudio's plans to make her fall in love. Despite the visit of her children to bid her farewell, Greta can only think of her reconciliation with Federico after saving his life. During the reading of Greta's will, Pablo, Barbara and Fátima are surprised to learn what her last will was.
78	"Jugamos tu mismo juego"	30 October 2024	2.29
Fátima regrets partnering with Claudio when she hears what he really thinks of her and his plans to take revenge for rejecting him. Bárbara assumes her place as head of the Uriarte family and gathers everyone together to honor Gonzalo's wish. Barbara undergoes a delicate surgery to ensure the health of the baby she is expecting. With Federico's help, Fátima sets up a trap to confront Claudio for his evil intentions and force him to sell his shares in the company.
79	"Estoy embarazada"	31 October 2024	2.05
Sebastián organizes a dinner to ask Fátima to be his wife. Despite their distancing, Carolina visits Sebastián to tell him that she is expecting his child. Sebastián asks Federico for advice on how to deal with Carolina's pregnancy, as he fears that Fátima will cancel their engagement. Claudio gets ahead of Sebastián and warns Fátima about Carolina's pregnancy hoping that she will cancel her engagement.
80	"Estamos más unidos que nunca"	1 November 2024	2.18
Fátima recognizes Sebastián's obligation to the baby on the way and considers the option of walking away from him forever. Sebastián confirms that Carolina is indeed pregnant, but she removed her IUD so her pregnancy was planned. Fátima assures Sebastián that she wants to be by his side and that she will help him take care of his child. She also asks him to resume the wedding plans they had. Despite knowing Bárbara's stance on marriage, Daniel asks her to be his wife and hopes she will accept, but she doesn't accept as she wants to prove to herself that she can take care of herself and that she doesn't need a man to be happy. Carolina informs Sebastián that she miscarried the baby. Bárbara is surprised when she realizes that the child she is expecting will arrive early, but is moved when she sees him for the first time. Fátima and Sebastián manage to overcome all the obstacles that kept them apart and celebrate their love in a ceremony accompanied by their loved ones.

== Reception ==
=== Ratings ===
Viewership and ratings per season of Mi amor sin tiempo
Season	Timeslot (CT)	Episodes	First aired		Last aired		Avg. viewers (millions)
Season	Timeslot (CT)	Episodes	Date	Viewers (millions)	Date	Viewers (millions)	Avg. viewers (millions)
1	Mon–Fri 6:30 p.m.	77	15 July 2024	2.14	1 November 2024	2.18	2.06

=== Awards and nominations ===
Year	Award	Category	Nominated	Result	Ref
2024	Produ Awards	Best Short Telenovela	Mi amor sin tiempo	Nominated	
