= Leticia Calderón =

Mexican actress (born 1968)

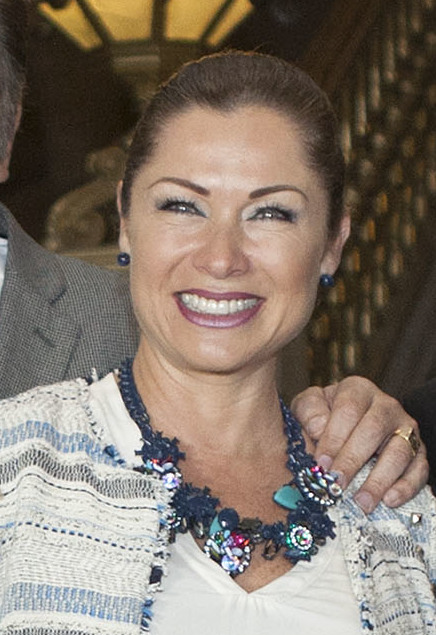
- Calderón in 2015, alongside Jorge Ortiz de Pinedo
- Born: Carmen Leticia Calderón León; July 15, 1968 (age 57); Guaymas, Sonora, Mexico
- Other name: Lety Calderón
- Occupation: Actress
- Years active: 1983-present
- Spouse: Marco López (m. 1997; div. 1999)
- Partner: Juan Collado (2002-2010)
- Children: 2
- Parent(s): Mario Calderón; Carmen León

Leticia Calderón (Spanish pronunciation: [leˈtisja kalðeˈɾon]; born Carmen Leticia Calderón León on July 15, 1968) is a Mexican actress.

She lived in Alvarado, Veracruz, Guaymas, Sonora, La Paz and Mexico City, where she studied at the Centro de Capacitación de Televisa (Televisa Educational Training Centre).

She has taken part in several theatrical plays and telenovelas. One of her most popular roles was in Esmeralda, a telenovela which was very successful, especially in Eastern European countries.

== Career ==
Calderón was born on July 15, 1968, in Guaymas, Sonora, Mexico.

=== 1980s ===
In 1983, aged 14, Leticia made appearances in telenovelas such as Bianca Vidal, Amalia Batista, Principessa, El ángel caído, and Monte Calvario.

She started taking mature roles in 1986 with the telenovela El camino secreto as an antagonist. Her first protagonist role was in 1987 when she starred in La indomable as María Fernanda Villalpando.

=== 1990s ===
In the 90s, Leticia starred in a number of telenovelas such as Yo compro esa mujer, Valeria y Maximiliano, Entre la vida y la muerte and made special appearances in Prisionera de amor and Lazos de amor.

In 1996 She would be cast as the main protagonist in the acclaimed telenovela La antorcha encendida where she plays the role of Teresa de Muñiz.

In 1997, she was a protagonist in Esmeralda alongside Fernando Colunga where she played blind.

In 1998, she made a special appearance in the telenovela El diario de Daniela.

In 1999, she starred as main heroine in Laberintos de pasión together with Francisco Gattorno and César Évora. She won the Premios TVyNovelas for Best Lead Actress for 2000 due to this role.

=== 2000s ===
During 2000–2008, she withdrew from telenovelas to dedicate more time to her children, one of whom has Down syndrome.

In 2003, she made a special appearance in Amor Real as Hanna de la Corcuera.

In 2006, she also had a special appearance in Heridas de amor as a younger version of the Nuria Bages character.

In 2008, Leticia participated in the series Mujeres asesinas, in the first episode of the show originally titled Sonia desalmanda next to Juan Soler and Grettel Valdéz.

In 2008, she starred as antagonist in En nombre del amor. She played the sister of Victoria Ruffo's character.

=== 2010s ===
In 2011, she made a special appearance in Rosy Ocampo's La fuerza del destino as Alicia Villagómez, mother to younger version of David Zepeda's character.

In 2012, she worked in the telenovela Amor bravío, in which she played the antagonist together with Silvia Navarro, Flavio Medina, Cristian de la Fuente and César Évora. Due to her performance she won the "Best Female Antagonist" award at the 31st TVyNovelas Awards in 2013.

In 2015, she was confirmed to star in another Carlos Moreno production, A que no me dejas, alongside Arturo Peniche, Camila Sodi and Osvaldo Benavides.

== Filmography ==
=== Films ===
Year	Title	Role	Notes
1992	Noches de ronda	Rosita	Film debut
1998	Angelito mío		
2008	Plaza Sésamo: Los monstruos feos más bellos	Lety	Direct-to-video
2024	El roomie	Elisa	

=== Television ===
Year	Title	Role	Notes
1982	Chispita		Television debut
1982	Bianca Vidal		
1983	Amalia Batista	Leticia	
1984	Principessa	Vicky	
1985	El ángel caído		
1986	Monte calvario	Tere	
1986	El camino secreto	Alma	
1987	Tal como somos	Meche	
1987	La indomable	María Fernanda	
1989	La casa al final de la calle	Teresa Altamirano Najera	
1990	La hora marcada	Lucía	Episode: "El taxi"
1990	Yo compro esa mujer	Ana Cristina	
1991	Valeria y Maximiliano	Valeria Landero	
1993	Entre la vida y la muerte	Susana Trejos	
1994	Mujer, casos de la vida real	Various roles	"Holocausto" (Season 10, Episode 5); "Te olvidaré" (Season 10, Episode 17)
1994	Prisionera de amor	Consuelo	
1995-1996	Lazos de amor	Asistente de Silvia Pinal	
1996	La antorcha encendida	Teresa de Muñiz	
1997	Esmeralda	Esmeralda Rosales-Peñarreal	
1998-1999	El diario de Daniela	Leonor Monroy	
1999-2000	Laberintos de pasión	Julieta Valderrama	
1999-2000	Cuento de Navidad	Spirit of Christmas Yet to Come	
2003	Amor real	Hanna De La Corcuera	
2006	Heridas de amor	Young Fernanda de Aragón	
2006	Plaza Sésamo	Lety	"Me da pena" (Season 10, Episode 15)
2008	Mujeres asesinas	Sonia Quevedo	"Sonia, desalmada" (Season 1, Episode 1)
2008-2009	En nombre del amor	Carlota Espinoza de los Monteros	
2011	Cuando me enamoro	Carlota Espinoza de los Monteros	Archive footage
2011	La fuerza del destino	Alicia Villagómez	
2012	Amor bravío	Isadora Viuda de Lazcano	
2015	A que no me dejas	Inés Urrutia de Murat	Season 1
2016	Mujeres de negro	Irene Palazuelos	
2019	El corazón nunca se equivoca	Elsa Reynoso Vargas	
2020	Soltero con hijas	Carmina Ríos/ de Montero	
2020-2021	Imperio de mentiras	Victoria Robles de Cantú	
2023	El amor invencible	Josefa Aizpuru de Torrenegro	
2024	Mi amor sin tiempo	Greta	

== Awards and nominations ==
=== Premios TVyNovelas ===
Year	Category	Telenovela	Result
1984	Best Actress Debut	Amalia Batista	Won
1987	Best Young Lead Actress	La indomable	Won
1991	Best Lead Actress	Yo compro esa mujer	Nominated
1993	Best Lead Actress	Valeria y Maximiliano	Nominated
1994	Best Lead Actress	Entre la vida y la muerte	Nominated
1997	Best Lead Actress	La antorcha encendida	Nominated
1998	Best Lead Actress	Esmeralda	Nominated
2000	Best Lead Actress	Laberintos de pasión	Won
2007	Best Presenter	Hoy	Nominated
2010	Best Female Antagonist	En nombre del amor	Won
2013	Best Female Antagonist	Amor bravío	Won
2016	Best Lead Actress	A que no me dejas	Won

==== Los Favoritos del Público ====
Year	Category	Telenovela	Result
2013	Favorite Antagonist	Amor bravío	Won

=== People en Español ===
Year	Category	Telenovela	Result
2009	Best Female Villain	En nombre del amor	Won
2012	Best Female Villain	Amor bravío	Won

=== Premios ACE ===
Year	Category	Telenovela	Result
1998	International Women's Figure of the Year	Esmeralda	Won
2010	Best Actress	En nombre del amor	Won
2013	Best Co-Star Actress	Amor bravío	Won

=== Galardón a los 30 grandes de TVyNovelas ===
Year	Category	Result
2009	Special Recognition for Artistic Career	Won

=== Cocktail de la moda ===
Year	Category	Result
2012	Special Recognition for Artistic Career	Won

=== Microfono de Oro ===
Year	Category	Telenovela	Result
2009	Artistic Excellence	En nombre del amor	Won

=== Premios Viktor (Slovenia) ===
Year	Category	Telenovela	Result
1998	Best telenovela	Esmeralda	Won
