= 31st TVyNovelas Awards =

2013 Mexican TV awards

- Date: April 28, 2013
- Location: Acapulco, Guerrero, Mexico
- Hosted by: Yuri, Alan Tacher & Galilea Montijo

Highlights
- Most awards: Abismo de pasión (6); Por ella soy Eva (6)
- Most nominations: Abismo de pasión (18)

Television/radio coverage
- Network: Canal de las Estrellas

The 31st TVyNovelas Awards were an academy of special awards to the best soap operas and TV shows. The awards ceremony took place on April 28, 2013, in Acapulco, Guerrero. The ceremony was televised in Mexico by Canal de las Estrellas and in the United States by Univision, which for the first time broadcast the awards simultaneously.

Yuri, Alan Tacher and Galilea Montijo hosted the show. Por ella soy Eva won 6 awards, the most for the evening, including Best Telenovela. Abismo de pasión also won 6 awards. Other winners Amor bravío and Corona de lágrimas won 3 awards each.

== Summary of awards and nominations ==
Telenovela	Nominations	Awards
Abismo de pasión	18	6
Por ella soy Eva	14	6
Amor bravío	11	3
Corona de lágrimas	7	3
Un refugio para el amor	5	0
Cachito de cielo	3	0

== Winners and nominees ==
=== Telenovelas ===
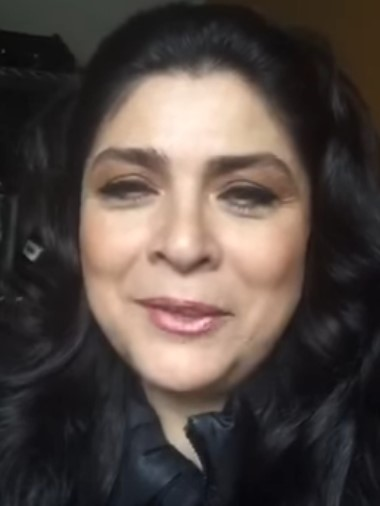
Victoria Ruffo, winner for Best Actress

David Zepeda, winner for Best Actor

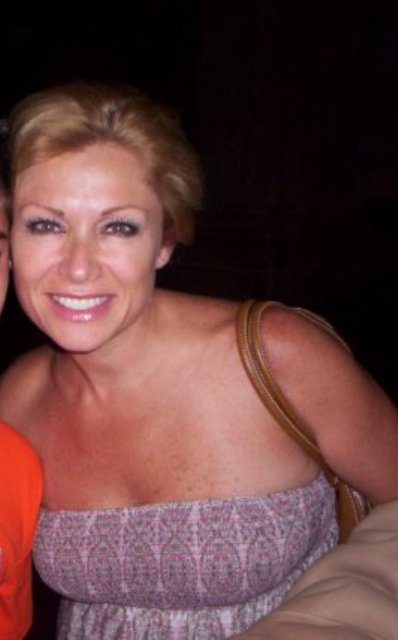
Leticia Calderón, winner for Best Antagonist Actress

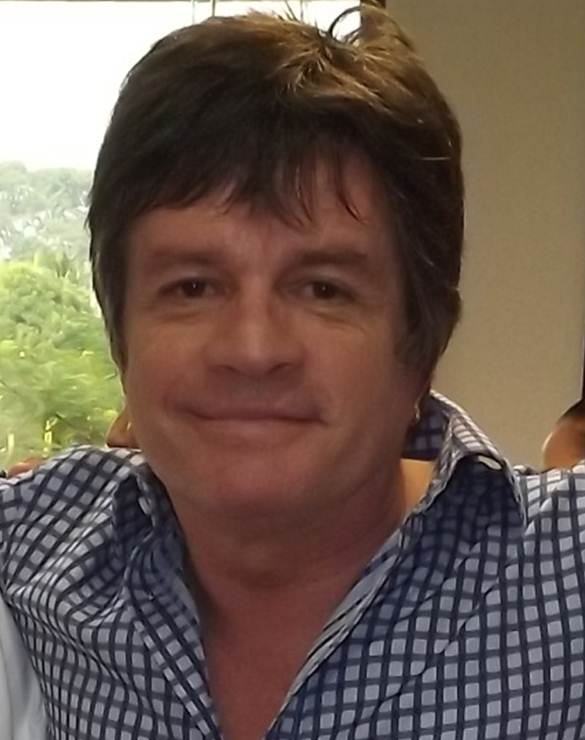
Alejandro Camacho, winner for Best Leading Actor

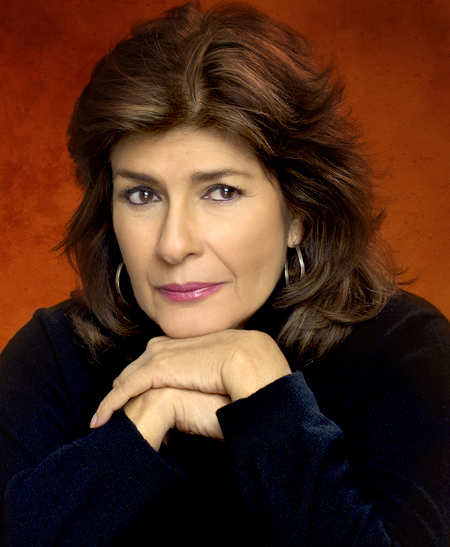
Raquel Olmedo, winner for Best Supporting Actress

Best Telenovela	Best Musical Theme
Por ella soy Eva; Abismo de pasión; Amor bravío; Corona de lágrimas	"Solo un suspiro" — Alejandra Orozco and Óscar Cruz – Abismo de pasión; "Corona de lágrimas" — Cristian Castro – Corona de lágrimas; "Cuando manda el corazón" — Vicente Fernández – Amor Bravío
Best Actress	Best Actor
Victoria Ruffo – Corona de lágrimas; Angelique Boyer – Abismo de pasión; Lucero – Por ella soy Eva; Zuria Vega – Un refugio para el amor	David Zepeda – Abismo de pasión; Cristian de la Fuente – Amor bravío; Gabriel Soto – Un refugio para el amor; Jaime Camil – Por ella soy Eva
Best Antagonist Actress	Best Antagonist Actor
Leticia Calderon – Amor bravío; Mariana Seoane – Por ella soy Eva; Sabine Moussier – Abismo de pasión	Marcelo Córdoba – Por ella soy Eva; César Évora – Amor bravío; Salvador Zerboni – Abismo de pasión
Best Leading Actress	Best Leading Actor
Blanca Guerra – Abismo de pasión; Helena Rojo – Por ella soy Eva; Raquel Olmedo – Abismo de pasión	Alejandro Camacho – Abismo de pasión; José Elías Moreno – Amor bravío; Manuel Ojeda – Por ella soy Eva
Best Co-lead Actress	Best Co-lead Actor
Patricia Navidad – Por ella soy Eva; África Zavala – Corona de lágrimas; Eugenia Cauduro – Abismo de pasión	Jesús Ochoa – Por ella soy Eva; Brandon Peniche – Un refugio para el amor; Francisco Gattorno – Abismo de pasión
Best Supporting Actress	Best Supporting Actor
Raquel Olmedo – Abismo de pasión; Laura Carmine – Amor bravío; Tiaré Scanda – Por ella soy Eva	Flavio Medina – Amor bravío; Eric del Castillo – Abismo de pasión; Pablo Valentín – Por ella soy Eva
Best Young Lead Actress	Best Young Lead Actor
Livia Brito – Abismo de pasión; Esmeralda Pimentel – Cachito de cielo; Mariana Van Rankin – Amor bravío	Ferdinando Valencia – Por ella soy Eva; Eddy Vilard – Amor bravío; Pablo Lyle – Cachito de cielo
Best Female Revelation	Best Male Revelation
Cassandra Sánchez Navarro – Corona de lágrimas; Esmeralda Pimentel – Abismo de pasión; Sofía Castro – Cachito de cielo; Tania Lizardo – Un refugio para el amor	Axel Ricco – Corona de lágrimas; Alberto Agnesi – Abismo de pasión; Erik Díaz – Un refugio para el amor
Best Original Story or Adaptation	Best Direction
Martha Carrillo, Cristina García and Denisse Pfeiffer – Amor bravío; Juan Carlos Alcalá, Rosa Salazar and Fermín Zúñiga – Abismo de pasión; Pedro Rodríguez, Alejandra Romero and Humberto Robles – Por ella soy Eva	Benjamín Cann and Rodrigo Zaunbos – Por ella soy Eva; Juan Carlos Muñoz and Alejandro Gamboa – Corona de lágrimas; Sergio Cataño and Claudio Reyes Rubio – Abismo de pasión

=== Others ===
Best Unit Program	Best Series
La rosa de Guadalupe; Como dice el dicho; La familia P.Luche	Los héroes del norte; Cloroformo; Miss XV
Best Entertainment Program	Best Competitions Program
Hoy; Los doctores; Sabadazo	La Voz... México 2; 100 mexicanos dijieron; Lo que más quieres; Parodiando; Pequeños gigantes 2
Best Restricted TV Program	Best Special Program
SuSana Adicción; Miembros al aire; Netas divinas	Festival Acapulco; América celebra a Chespirito; Bandamax Awards; Telehit Awards

== Audience's Favorites ==
The Audience's Favorites were categories that the audience chose through Twitter and the most voted were selected for the next round. Voting took place on the awards' official website. The awards ceremony took place on April 27, 2013, in Acapulco, Guerrero.

Mauricio Clark, Odalys Ramírez, Maxine Woodside and Jan hosted the show. Abismo de pasión won 3 awards, the most for the evening, including Favorite Telenovela. Other winners Amor bravío and Un refugio para el amor won 2 awards and Por ella soy Eva won 1 award.

=== Summary of awards and nominations ===
Telenovela	Nominations	Awards
Por ella soy Eva	7	1
Corona de lágrimas	6	0
Abismo de pasión	5	3
Amor bravío	5	2
Cachito de cielo	5	0
Un refugio para el amor	4	2

=== Winners and nominees ===
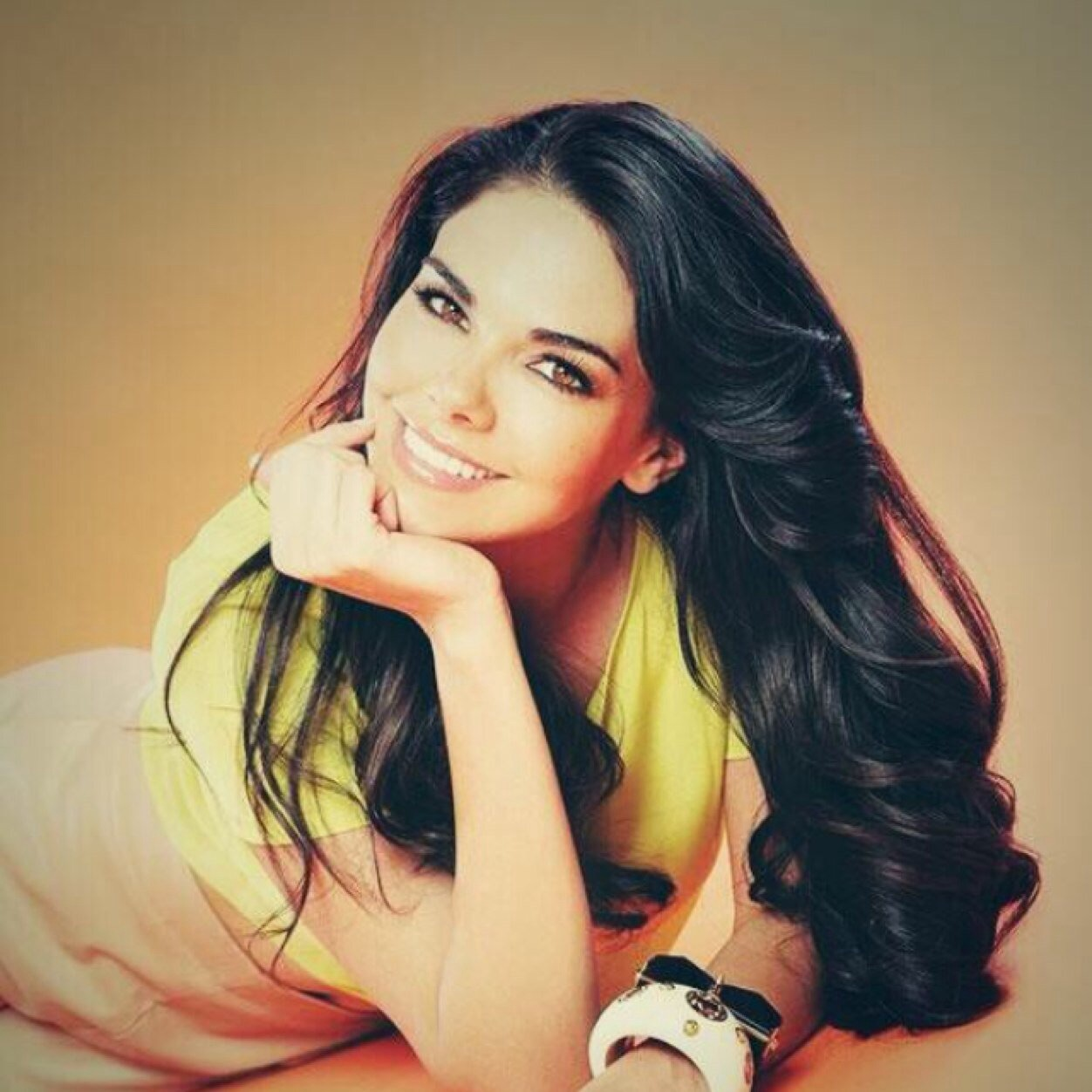
Livia Brito, awarded as The Most Beautiful Woman

Favorite Telenovela	Favorite Finale
Abismo de pasión; Cachito de cielo; Corona de lágrimas; Por ella soy Eva	Por ella soy Eva; Abismo de pasión; Cachito de cielo; Corona de lágrimas
The Most Beautiful Woman	The Most Handsome Man
Livia Brito – Abismo de pasión; Lucero – Por ella soy Eva; Maite Perroni – Cachito de cielo; Victoria Ruffo – Corona de lágrimas	David Zepeda – Abismo de pasión; Ferdinando Valencia – Por ella soy Eva; Gabriel Soto – Un refugio para el amor; Mane de la Parra – Corona de lágrimas
Favorite Villain	Favorite Slap
Leticia Calderón – Amor bravío; Adriana Louvier – Corona de lágrimas; Laura Flores – Un refugio para el amor; Sabine Moussier – Abismo de pasión	Silvia Navarro and Flavio Medina – Amor bravío; Fernanda Castillo and Cristián de la Fuente – Amor bravío; Lucero and Jaime Camil – Por ella soy Eva; Victoria Ruffo and Alejandro Nones – Corona de lágrimas
Favorite Kiss	Favorite Couple
Zuria Vega and Gabriel Soto – Un refugio para el amor; Lucero and Jaime Camil – Por ella soy Eva; Maite Perroni and Pedro Fernández – Cachito de cielo; Silvia Navarro and Cristián de la Fuente – Amor bravío	Zuria Vega and Gabriel Soto – Un refugio para el amor; Lucero and Jaime Camil – Por ella soy Eva; Maite Perroni and Pedro Fernández – Cachito de cielo; Silvia Navarro and Cristián de la Fuente – Amor bravío

== In Memoriam ==
- Rafael Baldwin
- Yuyu
- Yolanda Mérida
- Julio Alemán
- Juan "El Chato" Cejudo
- Carlos Cobos
- Alfredo Joskowicz
- Chavela Vargas
- Lourdes Canale
- Lucy Gallardo
- Luis De Llano Palmer
- Leonardo Favio
- Fernando Casanova (actor)
- Carlos Luis Castillo Preciado
- Jenni Rivera
- Gloria Mestre
- Arturo Rivera Ruiz
- Raul Araiza
- María Rivas (actress)
- Miguel Angel Ferriz
- Joaquín Cordero
- Carmen Montejo
- Sara Montiel
