= Entre la vida y la muerte =

Mexican telenovela

- Genre: Telenovela
- Created by: María Cristina Ribal
- Written by: María Cristina Ribal; Lourdes Barrios; Manuel Olvera Klunder; Georgina Tinoco
- Directed by: Miguel Córcega; Juan Carlos Muñoz; Mónica Miguel; Gastón Tuset
- Starring: Leticia Calderón; Fernando Ciangherotti; Sebastián Ligarde; Frances Ondiviela; Irán Eory; Roberto Cañedo; Beatriz Aguirre
- Opening theme: Entre la vida y la muerte by Eduardo Magallanes
- Country of origin: Mexico
- Original language: Spanish
- No. of episodes: 125

Production
- Executive producer: Angelli Nesma Medina
- Producer: Manuel Olvera Klunder
- Production locations: Chiapas, Mexico; Jalisco, Mexico; Guatemala City, Guatemala
- Cinematography: Isabel Basurto; Ricardo Hernández
- Running time: 21-22 minutes
- Production company: Televisa

Original release
- Network: Canal de las Estrellas
- Release: January 11 – July 2, 1993

Entre la vida y la muerte (Between Life and Death) is a Mexican telenovela produced by Angelli Nesma Medina for Televisa in 1993.

Leticia Calderón and Fernando Ciangherotti starred as protagonists, while Sebastián Ligarde and Frances Ondiviela starred as antagonists.

== Plot ==
Susana Trejos, a responsible doctor devoted to her patients, is about to marry Andrés del Valle, a lawyer with a shady past who carries on a secret affair with Ivonne, a hypocrite who claims to be Susana's best friend. However, Andrés' sister Paloma is the only one aware of the betrayal by both Andrés and his lover, but no one believes her. Susana is in love with Andrés, but he only wants to marry her to kill her and inherit her fortune. Mere hours before her church wedding, Susana receives a message that Andrés is in the Lacandon Jungle, gravely ill and near death.

True to her nature, Susana decides to fly by helicopter to save her beloved, only to find an archaeologist with the same name as her fiancé. Meanwhile, lawyer Andrés sets Susana’s apartment in Mexico City on fire, intending to kill her; however, one of Susana's friends is in the apartment and perishes in the fire, leaving her remains unrecognizable and everyone to assume it was Susana who died. Archaeologist Andrés receives Susana's medical care and as time passes, a romance blossoms between her and the archaeologist, even as betrayals and murders surround them, with a local woman, Mayán, plotting against Susana to win over the archaeologist for herself. Eventually, Susana and the archaeologist return to Mexico City. She reveals herself to some family members, but keeps her survival hidden from lawyer Andrés, so she can initiate a divorce after discovering his affair with Ivonne and his takeover of her assets.

== Cast ==
- Leticia Calderón as Susana Trejos
- Fernando Ciangherotti as Archaeologist Andrés del Valle
- Sebastián Ligarde as Lic. Andrés del Valle
- Frances Ondiviela as Ivonne del Castillo
- Irán Eory as Aída Trejos
- Roberto Cañedo as Rolando Trejos
- Beatriz Aguirre as Doña Rebeca
- Raúl Ramírez as Julián
- Mónika Sánchez as Angelica
- Lupita Sandoval as Carlota
- Maleni Morales as Constanza
- Óscar Bonfiglio as Lic. García
- Arsenio Campos as Francisco del Valle
- Dacia Arcaráz as Arlette
- Odiseo Bichir as Chon-Li
- Lucero Lander as Paloma del Valle
- Lorena Herrera as Jessica Rivas
- Wendy de los Cobos as Sandra
- María Cristina Ribal as Guadalupe del Valle
- Irán Castillo as Anita del Valle
- Alejandro Landero as Paco
- Ramiro Huerta as Bor
- Yadira Santana as Mayan/Cynthia
- Felicia Mercado as Cristina
- Andrea Cotto as Queta
- Alejandro Ciangherotti as Abraham del Valle
- Beatriz Martínez as Aurora del Valle
- Isabel Andrade as Claudia del Valle
- Alejandro Rábago as Melquiades
- Germán Gutiérrez as Dante
- Mario García González as Honorio
- María Luisa Coronel as Najbor
- Kokin as El Chino
- Ismael Larrumbe as El Perico

== Awards ==
Year	Award	Category	Nominee	Result
1994	12th TVyNovelas Awards	Best Actress	Leticia Calderón	Nominated
1994	12th TVyNovelas Awards	Best Antagonist Actor	Sebastián Ligarde	Won
