= Amor bravío =

Mexican telenovela

- Genre: Telenovela
- Created by: Martha Carrillo; Cristina García; Denisse Pfeiffer
- Based on: De pura sangre by María Zarattini
- Developed by: Ximena Suárez
- Written by: María Zarattini; Martha Carrillo; Cristina García
- Directed by: Jorge Robles; Fernando Nesme; Lily Garza
- Starring: Silvia Navarro; Cristián de la Fuente; Leticia Calderón; César Évora; Flavio Medina; René Strickler
- Theme music composer: Jorge Eduardo Murguía Perdaza; Mauricio López de Arriaga
- Opening theme: "Cuando manda el corazón" by Vicente Fernández
- Country of origin: Mexico
- Original language: Spanish
- No. of episodes: 166; 162 (International version); (list of episodes)

Production
- Executive producer: Carlos Moreno
- Production locations: Aculco; Mexico; Santiago de Chile
- Cinematography: Lino Gama; Jesús Nájera Saro
- Editors: Alfredo Sánchez Diaz; Mauricio Coronel
- Running time: 21-22 minutes (eps 1–10); 41-44 minutes (eps 11-166)
- Production company: Televisa

Original release
- Network: Canal de las Estrellas
- Release: March 5 – October 12, 2012

Related
- De pura sangre; La jaula de oro

Amor Bravío (International title: Valiant Love,) is a Mexican telenovela produced by Carlos Moreno Laguillo for Televisa that aired from March 5, 2012 to October 21, 2012. It is based on De pura sangre and En los cuernos del amor, a new story by Martha Carrillo and Cristina García. In the United States the telenovela aired from August 13, 2012 to April 12, 2013.

Silvia Navarro and Cristián de la Fuente star as the protagonists, while Leticia Calderón, César Évora, Flavio Medina, and Laura Carmine star as the antagonists.

== Plot ==
Camila Monterde is a beautiful veterinarian whose life has been torn apart by a tragic accident in which her fiancé, Luis, was killed. Hoping to ease her depression, her uncle, Daniel Monterde, invites her to live at his ranch, where she can rest and recover while caring for the many animals he keeps there. The ranch is managed by Alonso, an ambitious man who sees Camila’s arrival as the perfect opportunity to get his hands on the Monterde fortune; since Don Daniel has no children and loves Camila dearly, he assumes that she will be his heir. So Alonso, aided by his conniving mother Isadora, initiates his plan to win Camila’s heart and marry her.

Meanwhile, in Chile, Daniel Díaz lives a happy life with his wife, Miriam, who is expecting their first child. He has no idea that his fate is linked to the Monterdes in Mexico, or how drastically his life will soon change. Thirty years ago, Daniel’s late mother, Agatha, had an affair with Daniel Monterde but never told her son about it, or that she named him after the man she loved. However, Don Daniel recently began suspecting that Agatha’s son could be his only child. Daniel suddenly receives a letter stating that he has come into a substantial inheritance and must travel to Mexico to claim it. Surprised and curious, he’s about to make the trip when a vicious lie disrupts his plans and lands him in prison, causing him to lose the inheritance and his family.

Sometime later, deeply bitter and hungry for revenge, Daniel travels to Mexico determined to destroy the Monterde family, which he blames for his terrible misfortune. Assuming a false identity, he takes a job at the Monterde ranch to be close to his prey. His vengeance is perfectly planned except for one unexpected development: he and Camila fall passionately in love and that changes everything.

== Cast ==
=== Main ===
- Silvia Navarro as Camila Monterde Santos
- Cristián de la Fuente as Daniel Díaz Acosta / Andrés Duarte
- Leticia Calderón as Isadora González Vda. de Lazcano
- César Évora as Dionisio Ferrer / Héctor Gutiérrez
- Flavio Medina as Alonso Lazcano González
- René Strickler as Mariano Albarrán Mendiola

=== Also main ===
- José Elías Moreno as Leoncio Martínez
- Olivia Bucio as Agustina Santos
- Fernanda Castillo as Viviana Del Valle
- Yolanda Ventura as Piedad Martínez
- Laura Carmine as Ximena Díaz Santos
- Alex Sirvent as Rafael Quintana
- Héctor Sáez as Osvaldo Becerra
- Florencia del Saracho as Natalia Jiménez
- Ricardo Franco as Rodolfo Lara
- Eddy Vilard as Pablo Albarrán Mendiola / Pablo Monterde Mendiola
- Mariana Van Rankin as Luz María "Luzma" Martínez
- María Sorté as Amanda Jiménez Ulloa
- José Carlos Ruiz as Padre Baldomero Lozano
- Rogelio Guerra as Don Daniel Monterde
- Lisset as Miriam Farcas de Díaz
- Liliana Ross as Ágatha Acosta de Díaz
- Valentino Lanús as Luis del Olmo
- Toño Infante as Julián Hernández / Fidencio Hernández
- Alan Estrada as Aarón Quintana
- Alejandro Ruiz as Padre Anselmo Medrano
- Juan Diego Covarrubias as Yago Albarrán Mendiola
- Magda Guzmán as Refugio Chávez
- Norma Herrera as Rocío Mendiola de Albarrán
- Luis Couturier as Cayetano Albarrán
- Óscar Traven as Alberto Sodi
- Benjamín Rivero as Bruno Morán
- Raymundo Capetillo as Francisco Javier Díaz Velasco
- Tina Romero as Rosario "Chayo" Sánchez
- Luis Gatica as Hipólito

=== Recurring ===
- Abril Onyl as Irene
- Lorena del Castillo as Ileana Sodi
- Carlos Embry as Abraham Farcas
- Diego Soldano as Dante Barrienta
- Diego Denver as Andrés Duarte
- Patricia Conde as Ernestina "Netty"
- Khiabet Peniche as Dorotea
- Jorge Gallegos as Eleuterio
- Carmen Rodríguez as Felicia de Sodi
- Sandra Kai as Teresa "Tere" Medrano
- Ricardo Vera as Comandante Juárez
- Benjamín Islas as Salomón Morales León
- Macarena García as Ana Albarrán Mendiola
- Alfredo Alfonso as Estévez
- Vicente Herrera as Omar
- Ramón Valera as Gastón
- Mariana Díaz Araujo as Mayalén
- Ricardo Gómez as Román Quintana Del Valle

== Production ==
Production of Amor Bravío officially started on February 7, 2012. The program was originally called Lidia de Amor and was expected to have 220 episodes.

== Reception ==
In the United States the last episode reached 6.2 million Viewers.

=== Ratings ===
Timeslot (CT)	# Ep.	Premiere		Finale		TV Season
Timeslot (CT)	# Ep.	Date	Premiere ratings (in points)	Date	Finale ratings (in points)	TV Season
Monday-Friday; 7:45 pm (episodes: 1-10); Monday-Friday; 7:15 pm (episodes: 11-165)	166	March 5, 2012	22.3	October 21, 2012	22.5	2011

== Awards and nominations ==
Year	Award	Category	Recipient	Result
2012	Premios People en Español	Best Telenovela	Carlos Moreno Laguillo	Nominated
2012	Premios People en Español	Best Lead Actress	Silvia Navarro	Nominated
2012	Premios People en Español	Best Lead Actor	Cristián de la Fuente	Nominated
2012	Premios People en Español	Best Antagonist Actress	Leticia Calderón	Won
2012	Premios People en Español	Best Antagonist Actor	César Évora	Won
2012	Premios People en Español	Best Supporting Actor	René Strickler	Nominated
2013	31st TVyNovelas Awards	Best Telenovela	Carlos Moreno Laguillo	Nominated
2013	31st TVyNovelas Awards	Best Actor	Cristián de la Fuente	Nominated
2013	31st TVyNovelas Awards	Best Antagonist Actress	Leticia Calderón	Won
2013	31st TVyNovelas Awards	Best Antagonist Actor	César Évora	Nominated
2013	31st TVyNovelas Awards	Best Leading Actor	José Elías Moreno	Nominated
2013	31st TVyNovelas Awards	Best Co-lead Actress	Laura Carmine	Nominated
2013	31st TVyNovelas Awards	Best Co-star Actor	Flavio Medina	Won
2013	31st TVyNovelas Awards	Best Young Lead Actress	Mariana Van Rankin	Nominated
2013	31st TVyNovelas Awards	Best Young Lead Actor	Eddy Vilard	Nominated
2013	31st TVyNovelas Awards	Best Musical Theme	"Cuando manda el corazón" - Vicente Fernández	Nominated
2013	31st TVyNovelas Awards	Best Original Story or Adaptation	Martha Carrillo, Cristina Garcia and Denisse Phiffer	Won
2013	Los Favoritos del Público	Favorite Couple	Silvia Navarro and Cristián de la Fuente	Nominated
2013	Los Favoritos del Público	Favorite Villain	Leticia Calderón	Won
2013	Los Favoritos del Público	Favorite Slap	Silvia Navarro slapping Flavio Medina	Won
2013	Los Favoritos del Público	Favorite Kiss	Silvia Navarro and Cristián de la Fuente	Nominated
2013	Premios ACE	Best Co-star Actress	Leticia Calderón	Won
2013	Premios ACE	Best Supporting Actress	Magda Guzmán	Won
2013	Premios Juventud	What a Hottie!	Cristián de la Fuente	Nominated
2013	Premios Juventud	Girl of my dreams	Silvia Navarro	Nominated
2013	Premios Juventud	Best Soap Opera Theme	"Cuando manda el corazón" - Vicente Fernández	Nominated
