= Valeria y Maximiliano =

Mexican telenovela

- Genre: Telenovela; Romance; Drama
- Written by: Nora Alemán; Lorena Salazar; Eduardo Quiroga
- Directed by: Luis Vélez; José Acosta Navas; Claudio Reyes Rubio
- Starring: Leticia Calderón; Juan Ferrara; Marco Muñoz; Arturo Peniche; Ana Colchero; Cecilia Gabriela; Magda Karina
- Opening theme: Valeria y Maximiliano by Bebu Silvetti ¿Dónde andará el amor? by Denisse de Kalafe (rebroadcasting 2000)
- Ending theme: Promesas en la noche by Lourdes Munguía
- Country of origin: Mexico
- Original language: Spanish
- No. of episodes: 90

Production
- Executive producer: Carlos Sotomayor
- Producer: Rafael Urióstegui
- Production locations: Mexico City; Guadalajara; New York City, NY, United States
- Cinematography: Carlos Guerra Villareal
- Running time: 41-44 minutes
- Production company: Televisa

Original release
- Network: Canal de las Estrellas
- Release: December 23, 1991 – May 1, 1992

Related
- Heridas de amor (2006)

Valeria y Maximiliano is a Mexican telenovela produced by Carlos Sotomayor for Televisa in 1991.

Leticia Calderón and Juan Ferrara starred as protagonists, while Ana Colchero and Marco Muñoz starred as antagonists.

== Synopsis ==
This is the story of Valeria, the beautiful daughter of Miguel and Blanca Landero. Her beauty leads to jealousy and destruction while her strength helps her overcome all her family's troubles. Valeria rejects many men but the worst of which is Roman de la Fuente who destroys her family after she rejects him. Luckily Valeria is not alone, Maximiliano (who is in love with her) always lends a shoulder to cry on.

== Cast ==
Main

- Leticia Calderón as Valeria Landero de Franco de Riva
- Juan Ferrara as Maximiliano Riva
- Marco Muñoz as Román de la Fuente
- Arturo Peniche as Patricio del Val
- Ana Colchero as Susana Landero
- Cecilia Gabriela as Dulce Landero

Supporting

- Magda Karina as Nydia Ramos
- Gina Romand as Mercedes Ramos
- Rubén Rojo as Julio Souberville
- Rosita Arenas as Blanca Landero
- Claudio Obregón as Ernesto Ramos
- Carlos Bracho as Miguel Landero
- Magda Guzmán as Eugenia Landero "Mamá U"
- Eugenia Avendaño as Aunt Nena
- Juan Carlos Muñoz as Salvador Becerril
- Daniela Durán as Lucy Mora
- Héctor Parra as Dr. José Sánchez
- Hugo Acosta as Alberto de la Garza
- Luis Uribe as Captain Manuel Nava
- Ricardo Leal as Oficial Noriega
- Jorge Salinas as Damián Souberville
- Israel Jaitovich as Juan Pablo Souberville
- Guillermo Quintanilla as Matías
- Humberto Yáñez as Jiménez
- Cuca Dublán as Tomasa
- Rubén Camelo as Toño
- Tere Rábago as Benita
- Vivian Gray as Angélica Corso
- Georgina Pedret as Verónica
- Guadalupe Bolaños as Lety
- José María Negri as Fausto
- Graciela Bernardos as Psychiatrist
