= Basic (2003 film) =

2003 film by John McTiernan

- Theatrical release poster
- Directed by: John McTiernan
- Written by: James Vanderbilt
- Produced by: Mike Medavoy; Arnie Messer; James Vanderbilt; Michael Tadross
- Starring: John Travolta; Connie Nielsen; Samuel L. Jackson; Giovanni Ribisi; Brian Van Holt; Taye Diggs; Cristián de la Fuente; Dash Mihok; Tim Daly; Roselyn Sánchez; Harry Connick Jr.
- Cinematography: Steve Mason
- Edited by: George Folsey Jr.
- Music by: Klaus Badelt
- Production companies: Intermedia Films; Phoenix Pictures
- Distributed by: Columbia Pictures (United States, Canada and Japan; through Sony Pictures Releasing); Constantin Film (Germany); Intermedia (Overseas)
- Release date: March 28, 2003 (United States)
- Running time: 98 minutes
- Countries: United States; Germany
- Language: English
- Budget: $50 million
- Box office: $42.8 million

Basic is a 2003 crime-action thriller film directed by John McTiernan, written by James Vanderbilt, and starring John Travolta, Connie Nielsen and Samuel L. Jackson. It is the second film starring Travolta and Jackson after Pulp Fiction. The film follows DEA agent Tom Hardy solving the mystery of a bungled training exercise that leads to the deaths of multiple Army Ranger trainees and their instructor Nathan West.

Basic was released by Columbia Pictures (through Sony Pictures Releasing) on March 28, 2003 in the United States, Canada and Japan, with Constantin Film releasing in Germany. The film received negative reviews from critics regarding its overall plot and numerous twist endings. The film was also a box-office bomb, grossing only $42.8 million worldwide against a $50 million budget.

As of 2026, it is McTiernan's most recent film given his subsequent criminal charges and eventual incarceration related to wiretapping.

== Plot ==
On a live fire exercise in the jungles of Panama, a team of Army Rangers trainees is led by instructor and Master Sergeant Nathan West, tasked with traversing the jungle in hurricane weather, attacking pop-up metal targets with live ammunition and then reconvening at a small bunker. Sergeant Ray Dunbar emerges from the jungle carrying wounded Second Lieutenant Levi Kendall. The two men are pursued by Sergeant Mueller, whom Dunbar kills in self-defense. Although no other bodies are found, West's team is presumed dead. Dunbar refuses to talk to Military Police investigator Captain Julia Osborne, insisting on speaking to a fellow Ranger from outside the base by drawing an 8 on a piece of paper. The post commander, Colonel Bill Styles, tasks his friend Tom Hardy (a skilled interrogator, ex-Ranger and now DEA agent) to assist Osborne.

Interrogating the survivors, they learn that West was infamously abusive, particularly towards trainee Jay Pike, whose penchant for disobedience enraged West, potentially inspiring Pike to stage the murder. Kendall, the homosexual son of a Joint Chiefs of Staff general, claims West possibly ordered a "training accident" on him out of hatred and died when hit in the back with a phosphorus grenade. When Pike confessed to the crime, Dunbar volunteered to turn him in. Dunbar conversely claims that when West discovered Mueller and his fellow trainee Castro illegally selling prescription drug injection kits called "combat cocktails" intended to dull physical pain and sharpen the mind, Mueller used Pike's grenade to kill West and attempted to frame Pike. After confessing to supplying the drugs and falsifiying tests, physician Peter Vilmer, Osborne's intermittent lover and an old friend of Hardy, is placed under arrest.

Defying Styles' orders, Osborne and Hardy proceed to interrogate Kendall, who begins vomiting blood. Before dying, he draws an '8' with his own blood on Osborne's hand. Hardy explains a rumor about "Section 8", a group of ex-Rangers in Panama who apparently trained under West before turning rogue and becoming drug dealers. Furious, Styles relieves Osborne of duty and dismisses Hardy, deeming the investigation closed as a CID transport from Washington arrives to take Vilmer and Dunbar away.

Vilmer accidentally reveals that "Dunbar" is actually Pike, and Hardy removes Pike from the plane just before takeoff. Forcibly pressured by Hardy, Pike confesses that after West learned about the cocaine-smuggling operation occurring on base, he confronted the Rangers and threatened to turn them in to authorities. He corroborates Kendall's earlier testimony that after a firefight, West and the other trainees were killed, further adding that he took Dunbar's dog tags and carried Kendall to the extraction point. He gives Hardy, Osborne, and Styles the number of a crate where Vilmer had stowed cocaine. Hardy confronts Styles, determining that he masterminded the drug-dealing operation. West reported the operation to Styles, who then ordered Mueller and Kendall to kill him in the jungle, and poisoned Kendall to silence him. After unsuccessfully attempting to bribe Hardy, Styles attempts to shoot him. However, he is killed by Osborne, who had overheard their conversation.

As the investigation concludes, Osborne's suspicions of Hardy's involvement in the incident are confirmed when she watches Pike sneak into Hardy's car. Following them into Panama City and entering a building with an eight-ball hanging above, she attempts to arrest Hardy once inside, only to be surprisingly greeted by West, Pike and the missing members of the team – Castro, Dunbar, and Nuñez, whom Hardy reveals as his "colleagues". The members reveal that Section 8 is actually a covert black-ops anti-drug unit, posing as mercenaries to intimidate the cartels. While infiltrating the base undercover to investigate cocaine trafficking, they discovered that Mueller, Kendall and Vilmer were responsible. West, unaware that Styles was also involved, informed him of the drug dealing, after which the training mission became a covert operation to circumvent Mueller and Kendall and fake West's death to extract West from leadership and transfer him to Section 8. Hardy, therefore, was summoned to confirm Styles' and Vilmer's involvement. Impressed by Osborne's work, West and Hardy invite her to join the unit, revealing that Hardy's position as a DEA agent is a cover; he actually remains in the Army as Section 8's Colonel.

== Cast ==
- John Travolta as DEA Agent/Colonel Tom Hardy
- Connie Nielsen as Captain Julia Osborne
- Samuel L. Jackson as Master Sergeant Nathan West
- Tim Daly as Colonel Bill Styles
- Giovanni Ribisi as Second Lieutenant Levi Kendall
- Brian Van Holt as Sergeant Ray Dunbar
- Taye Diggs as Jay Pike
- Dash Mihok as Sergeant Mueller
- Cristián de la Fuente as Castro
- Roselyn Sánchez as Nuñez
- Harry Connick Jr. as Dr. Peter Vilmer

== Production ==
In May 2000, it was announced Phoenix Pictures had acquired James Vanderbilt's thriller script Basic for $400,000 against $700,000 following a heated bidding war with several other studios. In August of that year, it was announced Lee Tamahori had entered negotiations to direct the film. In October, Benicio del Toro and Catherine Keener were announced to be in final negotiations to play the leads. In July 2001, it was announced John McTiernan would be stepping in as director after Tamahori dropped out during realignment with Intermedia. After development of the project stumbled, the project was realigned when Intermedia came on board as a financier with del Toro and Keener having since dropped out. In September of that year, it was announced John Travolta and Samuel L. Jackson would star in the film.

In an interview with Empire in June 2014 McTiernan said of the production: "It was an absolute fucking nightmare. The week before shooting, I was told I was going to have to shoot the original draft of the screenplay, which didn't work. Furthermore, I was sent a lawyer's letter saying I couldn't tell this to the studio and would be sued if I tried to communicate it to them. I was able to squirrel away half-a-million dollars to do re-shoots, but the story still makes no sense. No sense at all."

== Reception ==
=== Box office ===
Basic earned $11.5 million in its opening weekend, ranking behind Head of State, Bringing Down the House and The Core. It grossed $26,793,311 in the US by the end of its theatrical run.

=== Critical response ===
On the review aggregator website Rotten Tomatoes, 21% of 140 critics' reviews are positive, with an average rating of 4.5/10. The website's consensus reads: "Basic gets so needlessly convoluted in its plot twists that the viewer eventually loses interest." Metacritic, which uses a weighted average, assigned the film a score of 34 out of 100, based on 33 critics, indicating "generally unfavorable" reviews. Audiences polled by CinemaScore gave the film an average grade of "B" on an A+ to F scale.

Roger Ebert wrote that it was "not a film that could be understood", and that "It is all smoke and no mirrors. If I were to see it again and again, I might be able to extract an underlying logic from it, but the problem is, when a movie's not worth seeing twice, it had better get the job done the first time through." Christopher Smith of the Bangor Daily News gave the film a D, saying, "The film tries too hard to be something it isn't - a smart, crafty little cross between The Usual Suspects, Rashomon and The General's Daughter as directed by John Woo after taking one heady snort of glue." Rob Blackwelder of SPLICEDwire explained that the film was "so full of cheap red herrings that watching it feels like gorging on a Long John Silver's all-you-can-eat buffet."

Elvis Mitchell of The New York Times gave the film a scoring of one out of four, saying, "Someone decided to put Rashomon in a Cuisinart along with A Few Good Men, The Usual Suspects and A Soldier's Story, and hit the pulverize button while forgetting to replace the top." Marjorie Baumgarten of The Austin Chronicle commended Travolta and Jackson for delivering "a couple of fun, over-the-top moments" and Giovanni Ribisi for scenery chewing "like nobody's business" but felt the film comes across as a "preposterous" mess, saying, "It begins in a muddle and ends in confusion. In between, Basic takes more silly twists than any that might be on display at a Chubby Checker look-alike contest."

Chuck Randolph of Slant Magazine was mixed on the overall cast's performances, commended McTiernan's "efficient technical direction", and criticized the multiple twist endings for putting the film's "straightforward" action thriller story into "kindergarten territory", saying that "Basic is actually boiled down to the most uncomplicated of summations: it makes absolutely no sense." Leonard Maltin's Movie Guide gave it two stars out of four and wrote that the film "keeps adding layers of confusion so that it becomes less interesting as it goes along! The final "twist" seems to negate the entire story, like a bad shaggy-dog joke."
