= List of A que no me dejas episodes =

This is a list of episodes for the Televisa telenovela A que no me dejas.

== Series overview ==
Season	Episodes		Originally released	
Season	Episodes		First released	Last released
1	141	71	July 27, 2015	November 2, 2015
1	141	70	November 3, 2015	February 7, 2016

== Episodes ==
=== Season 1 (2015–16) ===
No. overall	No. in season	Title	Original release date
Part 1
1	1	"La leyenda de la estrella de mar"	July 27, 2015
2	2	"Los Murat contra los Olmedos"	July 28, 2015
3	3	"Paulina o Julieta"	July 29, 2015
4	4	"Un amor condicionado"	July 30, 2015
5	5	"Una oportunidad para Camilo"	July 31, 2015
6	6	"El destino de Mauricio"	August 3, 2015
7	7	"Ama y sufre en silencio"	August 4, 2015
8	8	"Entre la espada y la pared"	August 5, 2015
9	9	"¡Malditos celos!"	August 6, 2015
10	10	"A que te enamoro una vez"	August 7, 2015
11	11	"Una mentira pone en duda mil verdades"	August 10, 2015
12	12	"Caras vemos, corazones no sabemos"	August 11, 2015
13	13	"Hay secretos que guardar y temores que enfrentar"	August 12, 2015
14	14	"Todo o nada"	August 13, 2015
15	15	"Rey sin reina"	August 14, 2015
16	16	"Sin salida"	August 17, 2015
17	17	"¡No más mentiras!"	August 18, 2015
18	18	"Cambio de planes"	August 19, 2015
19	19	"La boda"	August 20, 2015
20	20	"Todo en contra"	August 21, 2015
21	21	"Dispuesto a todo"	August 24, 2015
22	22	"Sin control"	August 25, 2015
23	23	"Ya no más"	August 26, 2015
24	24	"La confrontación"	August 27, 2015
25	25	"¡Decisiones peligrosas!"	August 28, 2015
26	26	"Amor y odio"	August 31, 2015
27	27	"¡Todo se descubre!"	September 1, 2015
28	28	"Se terminó la mentira"	September 2, 2015
29	29	"¡Sin perdón!"	September 3, 2015
30	30	"Sin oportunidad"	September 4, 2015
31	31	"La propuesta"	September 7, 2015
32	32	"¡Liberación!"	September 8, 2015
33	33	"El chantaje"	September 9, 2015
34	34	"La despedida"	September 10, 2015
35	35	"La promesa"	September 11, 2015
36	36	"Cuando todo acaba, algo comienza"	September 14, 2015
37	37	"Una nueva oportunidad"	September 15, 2015
38	38	"Mío y de nadie más"	September 16, 2015
39	39	"En la guerra y en el amor todo se vale"	September 17, 2015
40	40	"No todo es lo que parece"	September 18, 2015
41	41	"Ni premios ni castigos, solo consecuencias"	September 21, 2015
42	42	"La sorpresa"	September 22, 2015
43	43	"El juicio"	September 23, 2015
44	44	"Una nueva vida"	September 24, 2015
45	45	"Un amor eterno"	September 25, 2015
46	46	"La tragedia de Nuria"	September 28, 2015
47	47	"Adiós a Gonzalo"	September 29, 2015
48	48	"El oscuro pasado de Chelo"	September 30, 2015
49	49	"Inés rechaza el amor"	October 1, 2015
50	50	"¡Gonzalo asesino!"	October 2, 2015
51	51	"El rescate de Karen"	October 5, 2015
52	52	"Un nuevo amor para Inés"	October 6, 2015
53	53	"El accidente de Camilo"	October 7, 2015
54	54	"La muerte de Camilo"	October 8, 2015
55	55	"La boda de Adrián"	October 9, 2015
56	56	"El secreto de Paulina"	October 12, 2015
57	57	"El tiempo lo cambia todo"	October 13, 2015
58	58	"El sueño de Camilo"	October 14, 2015
59	59	"¡Raquel desaparece!"	October 15, 2015
60	60	"La custodia de Valentina"	October 16, 2015
61	61	"Adrián y Valentina se conocen"	October 19, 2015
62	62	"Julieta se queda sin libertad"	October 20, 2015
63	63	"Pau, aún te amo"	October 21, 2015
64	64	"¡Adrián es libre!"	October 22, 2015
65	65	"Juntos otra vez"	October 23, 2015
66	66	"Un amor eterno"	October 26, 2015
67	67	"La boda de Adrián y Paulina"	October 27, 2015
68	68	"El fin de un amor"	October 28, 2015
69	69	"Gonzalo sin consuelo"	October 29, 2015
70	70	"Valentina y Mau son separados"	October 30, 2015
71	71	"El lenguaje del amor"	November 2, 2015
Part 2
72	1	"Una nueva historia"	November 3, 2015
73	2	"La venganza de René"	November 4, 2015
74	3	"Tras la fortuna"	November 5, 2015
75	4	"Un amor en silencio"	November 6, 2015
76	5	"Revelaciones"	November 9, 2015
77	6	"El corazón roto de Mau"	November 10, 2015
78	7	"Lazos de sangre"	November 11, 2015
79	8	"En contra del pasado"	November 12, 2015
80	9	"Mau y Valentina se reencuentran"	November 13, 2015
81	10	"Valentina a la defensiva"	November 16, 2015
82	11	"René, un rival para Mau"	November 17, 2015
83	12	"La verdad duele"	November 18, 2015
84	13	"Adriana y Valentina se conocen"	November 19, 2015
85	14	"El odio resurge"	November 20, 2015
86	15	"René y Leonel se unen"	November 23, 2015
87	16	"¡Valentina no se va!"	November 24, 2015
88	17	"Gonzalo en la mira"	November 25, 2015
89	18	"Nuria en el exilio"	November 26, 2015
90	19	"La propuesta de Eugenio"	November 27, 2015
91	20	"Mau se da por vencido"	November 30, 2015
92	21	"¿Eugenio y René son él mismo?"	December 1, 2015
93	22	"Julieta enfurece"	December 2, 2015
94	23	"Gonzalo enamorado"	December 3, 2015
95	24	"¡René es descubierto!"	December 4, 2015
96	25	"Mau contra René"	December 7, 2015
97	26	"Valentina sufre por amor"	December 8, 2015
98	27	"La decepción de Valentina"	December 9, 2015
99	28	"¡Gonzalo en peligro!"	December 10, 2015
100	29	"El silencio de Tobías"	December 11, 2015
101	30	"¡Julieta enfurece contra Silvia!"	December 14, 2015
102	31	"René, la esperanza de Gonzalo"	December 15, 2015
103	32	"René se sale con la suya"	December 16, 2015
104	33	"Tobías en serios problemas"	December 17, 2015
105	34	"Julieta se renueva"	December 18, 2015
106	35	"Carolina besa a Mau"	December 21, 2015
107	36	"Maite con sed de venganza"	December 22, 2015
108	37	"Adriana entre dos amores"	December 23, 2015
109	38	"Gonzalo en la mira"	December 24, 2015
110	39	"Raquel recuerda todo"	December 25, 2015
111	40	"Micaela rompe el silencio"	December 28, 2015
112	41	"Gonzalo denuncia a Nuria"	December 29, 2015
113	42	"El secuestro de Valentina"	December 30, 2015
114	43	"Nuria pone en peligro a Valentina"	December 31, 2015
115	44	"Valentina tiene un precio"	January 1, 2016
116	45	"Maite en contra de Osvaldo"	January 4, 2016
117	46	"Las malas intenciones de Ileana"	January 5, 2016
118	47	"René arrepentido"	January 6, 2016
119	48	"Fer se sacrifica por Valentina"	January 7, 2016
120	49	"Mau y Alexis al rescate"	January 8, 2016
121	50	"Mau dispuesto a luchar por Valentina"	January 11, 2016
122	51	"¡Osvaldo a la cárcel!"	January 12, 2016
123	52	"Julieta castiga a Nuria"	January 13, 2016
124	53	"¡Nuria lo pierde todo!"	January 14, 2016
125	54	"Angélica y Mónica al rescate de Osvaldo"	January 15, 2016
126	55	"Alexis, ¿el enamorado de Valentina?"	January 18, 2016
127	56	"Tobías y sus excesos"	January 19, 2016
128	57	"Los celos de Valentina"	January 20, 2016
129	58	"Alexis y Fer"	January 21, 2016
130	59	"Ileana seduce a Gonzalo"	January 22, 2016
131	60	"Alan y Fer… ¿Amigos?"	January 25, 2016
132	61	"René entre la espada y la pared"	January 26, 2016
133	62	"La campaña de Mau"	January 27, 2016
134	63	"¡Alan en peligro de muerte!"	January 28, 2016
135	64	"La caída de Leonel se avecina"	January 29, 2016
136	65	"El secreto de Jaime se descubre"	February 1, 2016
137	66	"¡Carolina en peligro!"	February 2, 2016
138	67	"Mau y Vali confiesan su amor"	February 3, 2016
139	68	"El amor llegó para todos"	February 4, 2016
140	69	"¿René tras las rejas?"	February 5, 2016
141	70	"Gran final"	February 7, 2016
