= Sergio Catalán =

Chilean footballer (born 1991)

Personal information
- Full name: Sergio Pablo Catalán Duque
- Date of birth: 29 August 1991 (age 35)
- Place of birth: Santa Cruz, Chile
- Height: 1.80 m (5 ft 11 in)
- Position: Defender

Team information
- Current team: Colchagua
- Number: 13

Youth career
- Curicó Unido

Senior career*
Years	Team	Apps	(Gls)
2010–2015	Curicó Unido	75	(4)
2015–2017	Magallanes	23	(1)
2017–	Colchagua	15	(0)
- * Club domestic league appearances and goals as of 9 March 2018

Sergio Pablo Catalán Duque (born 29 August 1991) is a Chilean footballer that currently plays as defender for Chilean club Colchagua.

He began his career at Curicó Unido.
