= Cristián de la Fuente =

Chilean–American actor, presenter, model and producer

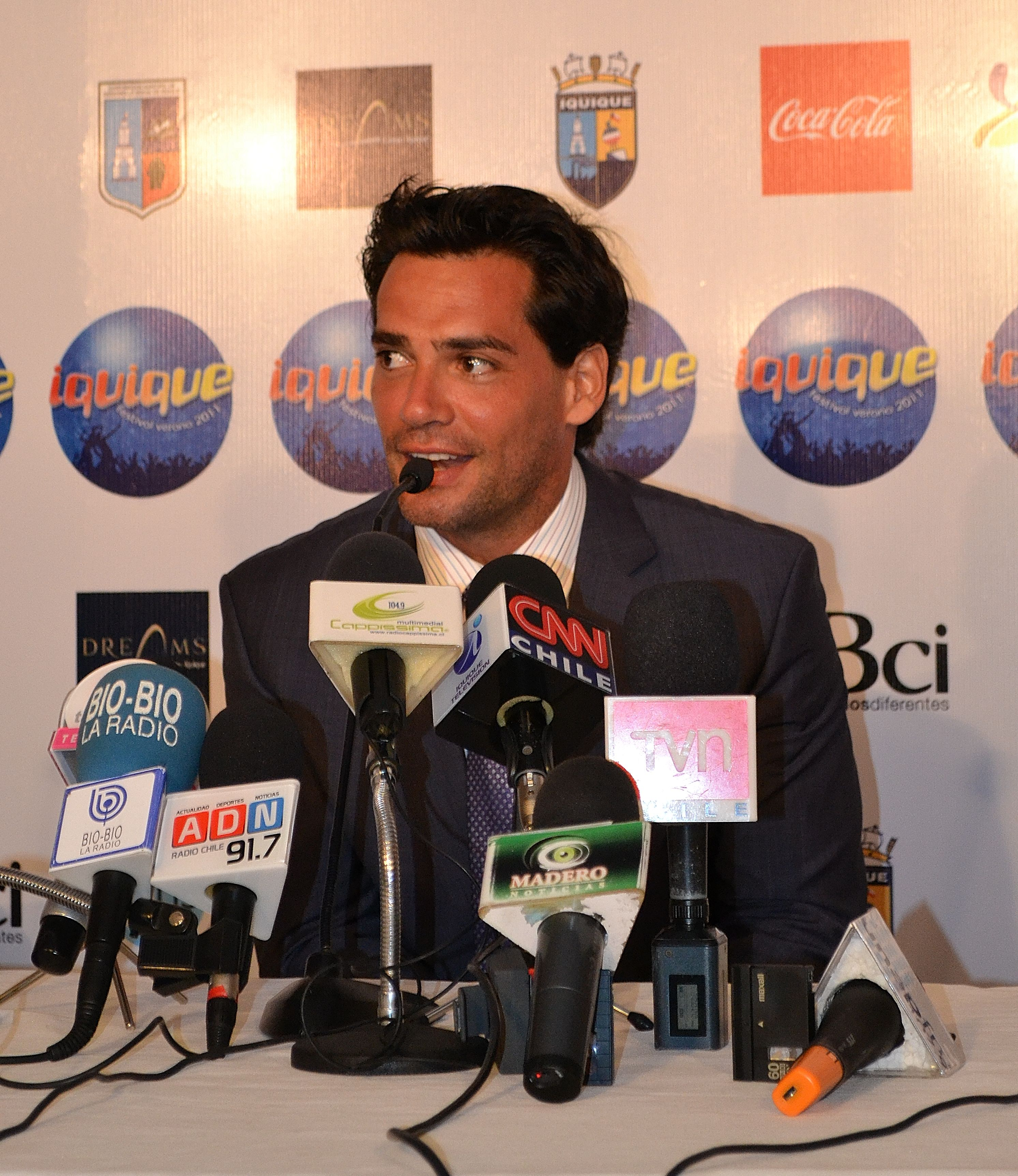
- de la Fuente in 2011
- Born: Cristián Andrés de la Fuente Sabarots; March 10, 1974 (age 52); Santiago, Chile
- Occupations: Actor; television presenter; model; producer
- Years active: 1994–present
- Height: 1.88 m (6 ft 2 in)
- Spouse: Angélica Castro (m. 2002; div. 2023)
- Children: 1

Cristián Andrés de la Fuente Sabarots (Spanish pronunciation: [kɾisˈtjan de la ˈfwente]; born March 10, 1974) is a Chilean actor, presenter, model and producer. He began his career appearing in Chilean telenovelas before moving to United States for starring in television series Family Law (1999–2001) and Hidden Hills (2002–2003). De la Fuente later made his big screen debut in the 2001 action film Driven and later appeared in films Vampires: Los Muertos (2002) and Basic (2003). In later years he was a regular cast member in In Plain Sight (2008–12) and Devious Maids (2015). De la Fuente also acted in a number of Spanish-language telenovelas.

== Early life and education ==
Cristian De la Fuente was born in Santiago, Chile, the only child of chemist Hugo de la Fuente (died 1996) and Adriana Sabarots, a homemaker of French descent. He served in the Chilean Air Force reserve prior to attending the Pontifical Catholic University of Chile, where he pursued a degree in civil engineering.

== Career ==
=== 1998–2003 ===
De la Fuente was spotted by a talent scout during his sophomore year as a civil engineering major at the Pontifical Catholic University of Chile, and won a contest as Chile's next "Super Teen". Beginning with small network roles in prime time, he quickly went on to star in four prime time dramas including Eclipse de Luna and the highly acclaimed televised theatrical production of La Tía de Carlos. He starred in Chile's number-one rated variety program Venga Conmigo, the comedy Mi Tío y Yo alongside Gonzalo Robles, and the MTV-style music and dance program Generación 2000.

In 1998, de la Fuente was contracted by Sony and Telemundo for a drama series remake of Starsky and Hutch called Reyes y Rey. The weekly hour format did not catch on with Hispanic viewers and it was soon cancelled. He was a guest star on Pensacola: Wings of Gold. He has also appeared regularly on CSI: Miami and Family Law. He has starred opposite Sylvester Stallone in Driven, in John Carpenter's Vampires: Los Muertos with Jon Bon Jovi, as well as the independent thriller Minimal Knowledge.

For his starring role in the independent thriller Minimal Knowledge, de la Fuente won the Individual Achievement Award for Best Male Actor at the Ajijic International Film Festival.

De la Fuente's hosting credits include MGM's Road to the Academy Awards for Latin America and the Walt Disney World Christmas Day Parade. He has also presented the Billboard Latin Music Awards, The World Music Awards, and the Alma Awards. De la Fuente also turned up in John McTiernan's military thriller Basic opposite John Travolta, and enjoyed several appearances on CSI: Miami as lab tech Sam Belmontes between 2003 and 2004.

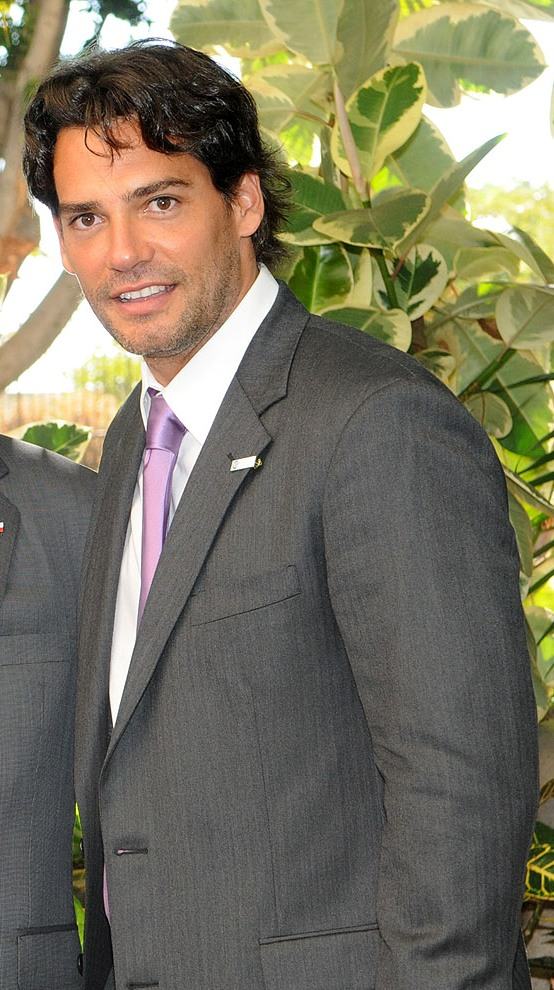
de la Fuente in 2010

=== 2004–2007 ===
In 2004, De la Fuente hosted alongside Kate del Castillo the first annual Premios Juventud on the Univision television network. In 2005, he starred in the Venevisión's Miami-made telenovela Soñar No Cuesta Nada, starring alongside Mexican actresses Karyme Lozano and Laura Zapata. It was a huge hit in the daytime slot on Univision. It ran for 191 episodes. On Univisión there were talks for him to host a night time talk show, but nothing came of it. He also had a recurring role as Aaron in the CBS sitcom The Class.

In 2005, Cristián was seen in supporting roles in the indie romantic drama Sueño with John Leguizamo and the Latin-themed comedy Once Upon a Wedding. He was a popular host for Spanish-language specials and series during this period, including the 2005 Latin Grammy Awards, the 2006 Premios Juventud, and the Chilean reality series Golpe Bajo, for which he also served as executive producer and writer. In 2005, he starred in the popular Venezuelan telenovela Soñar no Cuesta Nada, which filmed in Miami, Florida. De la Fuente also guest starred in three episodes of UPN's One on One, and in an episode of the wildly popular ABC show Ugly Betty. Amidst all the acting gigs, he continued to maintain his status with the Chilean Air Force, for which he occasionally performed as part of the aerial acrobatic troupe, Halcones. In the fall of 2007, he participated in the mini-series directed by Jennifer Lopez, Como Ama Una Mujer with the actress Leonor Varela.

=== 2008–present ===
De la Fuente appeared as a contestant on the sixth season of ABC's Dancing with the Stars with dance partner Cheryl Burke. They trained at Palm Beach, Florida's Paramount Ballroom, which is owned by former U.S. Nine-Dance Champion Alec Lazo. De la Fuente suffered a ruptured tendon in his left arm biceps on the April 28, 2008 episode of Dancing with the Stars. The following week, performing with his injured arm, he and Burke led the field. He was eliminated on May 20, 2008, in 3rd place.

De la Fuente hosted the Latin Grammy Awards of 2008 on November 13, 2008, in Houston, Texas.

In 2009, de la Fuente guest starred in the telenovelas Fuego en la sangre as Demian Ferrer, and Corazón salvaje as Renato.

From 2008 to 2010, de la Fuente played Raphael "Raph" Ramírez, a minor league baseball player and semi-boyfriend of Mary Shannon on In Plain Sight.

De la Fuente returned to Chile to film the season 2 of his TV show Golpe Bajo, similar to MTV's series Punk'd.

De la Fuente also had a recurring role on Brothers & Sisters from 2009 to 2010.

De la Fuente had recurring roles on ABC's Private Practice during its fourth season and on ABC Family's The Nine Lives of Chloe King during its first and only season.

De la Fuente starred as Maximiliano Montesinos, the protagonist in the Mexican telenovela Quiero amarte.

De la Fuente has been tapped to play Ricardo De La Cruz in the romantic comedy film Switch Up, helmed by Tara Pirnia in her directing debut.

==== Dancing with the Stars performances ====
Week #	Dance/Song	Judges' score			Result
Week #	Dance/Song	Inaba	Goodman	Tonioli	Result
1	Cha-cha-cha/ "Bang Bang"	7	7	7	N/A
2	Quickstep/ "Americano"	7	6	7	Last to be safe
3	Jive/ "Don't Stop Me Now"	8	8	9	Safe
4	Paso Doble/ "La Virgen de la Macarena"	9	8	9	Safe
5	Rumba/ "If You're Not the One"	7	8	8	Bottom Two
6	Foxtrot/ "Come Fly with Me"	9	9	9	Safe
7	Viennese Waltz/ "I'll Make Love to You"; Samba/ "Sobe Son"	8; 7	8; 7	9; 7	Safe
8	Tango/ "Beat It"; Mambo/ "Saca Tu Mujer"	10; 10	9; 9	9; 10	Safe
9 Semi-finals	Viennese Waltz/ "Satellite"; Samba/ "Sweetheart from Venezuela"	9; 10	9; 9	9; 10	Last to be Safe
10; Finals	Cha-Cha-Cha/ "Dancing on the Ceiling"; Freestyle/ "Suavemente"	8; 9	9; 8	9; 9	Third Place

== Filmography ==
=== Film ===
Year	Title	Role	Notes
2001	Driven	Memo Moreno	
2002	Minimal Knowledge	Matt Gallagher	
2002	Vampires: Los Muertos	Father Rodrigo	
2003	Basic	Castro	
2003	The Chosen One	Rodrigo	
2005	Once Upon a Wedding	Manolo	
2005	Sueño	Dr. López	
2009	Dawson Isla 10	Teniente Labarca	
2012	¿Alguien ha visto a Lupita?	Maxi	Also executive producer
2013	Siete años de matrimonio	Bernardo	
2014	Historias de Lavapiés	Teacher	
2015	Lushers		
2015	Enamorándome de Abril	Leo	Also producer

=== Television roles ===
Year	Title	Role	Notes
1994	Soltero a la medida	Ramiro Pérez Candia	
1995	Champaña	Tadeo Mc Millan	
1995	El amor está de moda	Lucas Correa	
1996	Marrón Glacé, el regreso	Blas	
1997	Eclipse de luna	Román Celis	
1998	Reyes y Rey	Rey / Alex "Rey" Reyes	
1999	Pensacola: Wings of Gold	Sgt. Dominguez	Episode: "Gypsy Tumble"
1999–2000	Family Law	Andres Diaz	Recurring role; 42 episodes
2000	Queen of Swords	Antonio	Episode: "Duel with a Stranger"
2002–2003	Hidden Hills	Manolo	Recurring role; 10 episodes
2003	Phil at the Gate		Television film
2003	Hope & Faith	Paolo	Episode: "Hope Has No Faith"
2003–2004	CSI: Miami	Sam Belmontes	Recurring role; 6 episodes
2004	Threat Matrix	Special Agent Wilmar Sánchez	Episode: "Mexico"
2004	Infidelidad	Miguel	Television film
2004	Eve	Dr. Anderson	Episode: "Footloose"
2005	Soñar no Cuesta Nada	Felipe Reyes Retana	191 episodes
2005–2006	One on One	Andrew	3 episodes
2006	The Class	Aaron	Recurring role; 7 episodes
2007	Ugly Betty	Rodrigo Veloso	2 episodes
2007	Psych	Zapato Dulce	Episode: "American Duos"
2007	Side Order of Life	Eduardo Encarnación	2 episodes
2007	Como ama una mujer	Andrés	Recurring role; 5 episodes
2008	Fuego en la sangre	Damián	Recurring role; 9 episodes
2008–2012	In Plain Sight	Raphael Ramirez	Recurring role; 23 episodes
2009	Brothers & Sisters	Cal	Episode: "S3X"
2009–2010	Corazón salvaje	Renato Vidal Montes de Oca / Renato Vidal	
2010–2011	Private Practice	Dr. Eric Rodriguez	4 episodes
2011	Love Bites	Marcelo (segment "Not to Speak")	Episode: "Stand and Deliver"
2011	The Nine Lives of Chloe King	Frank Cabrera	3 episodes
2011	Haven	Cornell Stamoran	Episode: "Friend or Faux"
2011	Prófugos	Ignacio Córdova	
2012	Maldita	Ignacio Echaurren	Recurring role; 9 episodes
2012	Amor Bravío	Daniel Díaz Acosta	Main role; 166 episodes
2013–2014	Quiero amarte	Maximiliano	Main role; 161 episodes
2014	Royal Pains	Tobias	2 episodes
2015	Devious Maids	Ernesto Falta	13 episodes
2016	Sueño de amor	Ricardo Alegría	Main role; 131 episodes
2017	En tierras salvajes	Daniel Otero	Main role

== Awards and nominations ==
Year	Premio	Category	Telenovela	Result
2010	28th TVyNovelas Awards	Best Actor Protagonist	Corazón Salvaje	Nominated
2012	Premios People en Español 2012	Best Lead Actor	Amor Bravío	Nominated
2012	Premios Telenovela de Oro	Best Actor Protagonist	Amor Bravío	Won
2013	31st TVyNovelas Awards	Best Actor Protagonist	Amor Bravío	Nominated
2013	31st TVyNovelas Awards	Favorite Couple	Silvia Navarro and Cristián de la Fuente	Nominated
2013	31st TVyNovelas Awards	Favorite Kiss	Silvia Navarro and Cristián de la Fuente	Nominated
2013	31st TVyNovelas Awards	El Mas Guapo (What A Hottie)	Cristián de la Fuente	Nominated
