= A que no me dejas =

Mexican telenovela

- Genre: Telenovela
- Screenplay by: Martha Carrillo; Cristina García; Denisse Pfeiffer
- Story by: Eric Vonn; Liliana Abud
- Directed by: Lili Garza; Fernando Nesme
- Creative director: Jerry Funes
- Starring: Camila Sodi; Osvaldo Benavides; Leticia Calderón; Arturo Peniche; Alfredo Adame; Cecilia Gabriela; Alejandra Barros; Erika Buenfil; César Évora
- Music by: Alejandro Sanz
- Opening theme: "A que no me dejas" performed by Alejandro Sanz
- Ending theme: "Pero tú" performed by Alejandro Sanz
- Country of origin: Mexico
- Original language: Spanish
- No. of seasons: 2
- No. of episodes: 141 (list of episodes)

Production
- Executive producer: Carlos Moreno
- Producer: Hilda Santaella
- Cinematography: Jorge Amaya; Alejandro Frutos
- Editors: Mauricio Coronel; Alfredo Sánchez
- Camera setup: Multi-camera
- Production company: Televisa

Original release
- Network: Canal de las Estrellas
- Release: July 27, 2015 – February 7, 2016

Related
- Amor en silencio; Háblame de amor

A que no me dejas, formerly known as A que no me dejas, corazón (English title: I Dare You to Leave), is a Mexican telenovela produced by Carlos Moreno for Televisa. It is a remake of the Mexican telenovela Amor en silencio, produced in 1988.

Production of A que no me dejas officially started on May 26, 2015 in Televisa San Ángel.

The series stars Camila Sodi as Paulina in the first part of the story and Valentina in the second part, Arturo Peniche, Cecilia Gabriela, Alejandra Barros, and Laura Carmine who appear in all episodes, Osvaldo Benavides as Adrián, Leticia Calderón as Inés, and Alfredo Adame as Alfonso in the first act and Erika Buenfil and César Évora and Ignacio Casano in the second act.

The series won seven awards at TVyNovelas Awards for Best Original Story or Adaptation, Best Direction and Best Direction of the Cameras. For its cast, Laura Carmine won for Best Antagonist Actress, Leticia Calderón for Best Leading Actress, Arturo Peniche for Best Leading Actor; its theme song "A que no me dejas" performed by Alejandro Sanz received the award for Best Musical Theme.

== Plot summary ==
A story where despite obstacles and betrayals, love succeeds, if not in the present, at least in the future and its generations. This is a heartbreaking story where power, envy, selfishness and the desire for possession tragically mark the deep love between Paulina (Camila Sodi) and Adrián (Osvaldo Benavides), who nevertheless manage to perpetuate their love and pass it on to their daughter Valentina (Camila Sodi) and Paulina's adopted son, their beloved Mauricio (Ignacio Casano). This melodrama is divided in two stages; in each one of them are the obstacles where love, first of Paulina and Adrian and later of Valentina and Mauricio, triumphs.

=== First stage ===
It is the story of Paulina and Adrián, a couple who love each other despite their families' dark past. Paulina is the daughter of Gonzalo Murat, a wealthy hotel entrepreneur who does not accept the relationship of his daughter with Adrián, with the reason that he does not have the same status as them. On the other hand, Julieta, Adrián's sister, is obsessed with him and blames Gonzalo for the death of her father; a situation that makes her feel a hatred for the entire Murat family. Julieta is right, Gonzalo is not the perfect man his wife, Inés, and his daughters Nuria and Paulina believe, since he is a man without a heart and double standards, because for more than ten years he has been having a relationship with Mónica, his former secretary with whom he also has two sons: René and Alan.

Nuria, sister of Paulina, join forces with Julieta to separate Paulina from Adrián. The multiple disagreements and misunderstandings caused by their rivals and enemies, cause Paulina and Adrián to be separated, not knowing that Paulina is pregnant.

Being away from Adrián, Camilo, an ex-boyfriend of Paulina, offers to take care and give his surname to the child. At the same time, Paulina decides to take charge of Mauricio, a deaf-mute child who adores Paulina and lives in the cover of the Murat family.

However, Adrián will return to the life of Paulina with the intention to win her love back. After they reconcile, they both decide to get married. On the joyous occasion, Julieta shows up, in order to murder Paulina, but instead shoots Adrián and Paulina. Sadly they both die in each other's arms, promising eternal love for one another.

=== Second stage ===
It has been 17 years since the tragedy that changed the life of Mauricio and Valentina, who have grown apart all this time, but communicating continuously. Valentina, who strongly resembles her mother physically, lives in Los Angeles along with Fernanda, her close friend, and Mauricio lives in Cancún, along with his grandmother Raquel.

Mauricio has been in love with Valentina since a child, and he will do everything possible to protect and care for her despite his disability and the obstacles that may arise.

Love is present in this story, as it was in the past, but Nuria, who remains resentful and full of frustration, will do whatever is in her power to get the fortune of her father. Julieta is determined to repeat history and put an end to the life of Valentina and Mauricio, as she did in the past with Paulina and Adrián.

== Episodes ==
Season	Episodes		Originally released	
Season	Episodes		First released	Last released
1	141	71	July 27, 2015	November 2, 2015
1	141	70	November 3, 2015	February 7, 2016

== Cast ==
=== Main ===
- Camila Sodi as Paulina Murat/Valentina Olmedo
- Osvaldo Benavides as Adrián Olmedo
- Leticia Calderón as Inés Murat
- Arturo Peniche as Gonzalo Murat
- Alfredo Adame as Alfonso Fonseca
- Cecilia Gabriela as Raquel Fonseca
- Alejandra Barros as Julieta Olmedo
- Erika Buenfil as Angélica
- César Évora as Osvaldo
- Laura Carmine as Nuria Murat
- Lisset as Mónica Greepé
- Alfonso Dosal as Camilo Fonseca
- Odiseo Bichir as Édgar
- Socorro Bonilla as Micaela
- Moisés Arizmendi as Jaime Córdova
- Salvador Zerboni as Leonel
- Luis Fernando Peña as Beto
- Gabriela Zamora as Chelo
- Florencia de Saracho as Karen
- Ernesto D'Alessio as Darió Córdova
- Martha Julia as Ileana
- Maya Mishalska as Maite
- Ignacio Casano as Mauricio Fonseca
- Brandon Peniche as René Greepe
- Juan Pablo Gil as Alan Greepe
- Ela Velden as Fernanda
- David Ostroky as Clemente
- Lenny de la Rosa as Alexis
- Adriano Zendejas as Tobías
- Jade Fraser as Carolina
- Jorge Gallegos as Félix
- Maricruz Nájera as Silvia

=== Recurring ===
- Diego Escalona as Child Mauricio
- Fede Porras as Child René
- Santiago Emiliano as Child Alan
- Maribel Lancioni as Elisa
- Adanely Núñez as Gisela
- Eva Cedeño as Odette Córdova
- Abril Onyl as Olga
- Jonnathan Kuri as Flavio Maccari
- Juan Colucho as Gastón
- Sergio Zaldívar as Julio
- Marcus Ornellas as Ariel
- Fernando Orozco as Joel
- Jaime De Lara as Fabricio
- Natalia Ortega as Adriana
- Daniela Cordero as Almudena
- Estrella Martín as Triana
- Tania Riquenes as Débora

== Soundtrack ==
No.	Title	Performer(s)	Length
1.	"Te busco"	Ainhoa	—
2.	"Ni lo intentes"	Lupita D'Alessio	—
3.	"Caso perdido"	Lupita D'Alessio	—
4.	"Cuando se ama como tú"	Lupita D'Alessio	—
5.	"Contigo"	José Hugo García Pellecer	—
6.	"Volví a nacer"	Carlos Vives	—
7.	"Quédate aquí"	Paco de María	—
8.	"Así como si nada"	Samo	—
9.	"Cuando estamos solos"	Eduardo Tagle	—
10.	"Ven"	Tommy Torres and Gaby Moreno	—
11.	"A que no me dejas"	Alejandro Sanz and Alejandro Fernández	—
12.	"A que no me dejas" (Opening theme)	Alejandro Sanz	—
13.	"Pero tú" (Opening theme "season 2")	Alejandro Sanz	—

== Awards and nominations ==
Year	Award	Category	Recipients and nominees	Outcome
2015	Presea Luminaria de Oro 2015	Performance Recognition	A que no me dejas	Won
2016	34th TVyNovelas Awards	Best Telenovela of the Year	A que no me dejas	Nominated
2016	34th TVyNovelas Awards	Best Actor	Osvaldo Benavides	Nominated
2016	34th TVyNovelas Awards	Best Antagonist Actress	Laura Carmine	Won
2016	34th TVyNovelas Awards	Best Young Lead Actor	Alfonso Dosal	Nominated
2016	34th TVyNovelas Awards	Best Leading Actress	Leticia Calderón	Won
2016	34th TVyNovelas Awards	Best Leading Actor	Arturo Peniche	Won
2016	34th TVyNovelas Awards	Best Co-lead Actress	Cecilia Gabriela	Nominated
2016	34th TVyNovelas Awards	Best Male Revelation	Ignacio Casano	Nominated
2016	34th TVyNovelas Awards	Best Direction	Lili Garza & Fernando Nesme	Won
2016	34th TVyNovelas Awards	Best Musical Theme	"A que no me dejas"	Won
2016	34th TVyNovelas Awards	Best Cast	Carlos Moreno	Nominated
2016	34th TVyNovelas Awards	Best Original Story or Adaptation	Martha Carrillo & Cristina García	Won
2016	34th TVyNovelas Awards	Best Direction of the Camaras	Alejandro Frutos Maza & Jorge Amaya Rodríguez	Won
