= Martha Carrillo =

Mexican journalist and writer (born 1963)

- Born: Martha Leticia Carrillo Perea; 4 March 1966 (age 60); CDMX, Mexico
- Occupations: Journalist; writer
- Writing career
- Notable awards: TVyNovelas Award for Best Original Story or Adaptation (2013)

Martha Carrillo (born Martha Leticia Carrillo Perea on October 25, 1963 in Mérida, Yucatán, Mexico) is a Mexican journalist and writer. She works for Televisa.

Her adaptations include: Tres mujeres in 1999, Bajo la misma piel in 2003, En Nombre Del Amor in 2008, Cuando Me Enamoro in 2010 and Amor bravío in 2012.

== Partial filmography ==
=== Reality television ===
- Operación Triunfo (Mexican TV series)

=== Series ===
- S.O.S.: Sexo y otros Secretos (with Cristina García)

=== Telenovelas ===
- A que no me dejas (with Cristina García)
- Alondra (Yolanda Vargas Dulché played a role)
- Amor bravío (with Cristina García and co-adapted with Denisse Pfeiffer)
- Atrévete a Olvidarme (with Roberto Hernández Vázquez and Martha Oláiz)
- Bajo la misma piel (with Cristina García)
- Cuando Me Enamoro (with Cristina García and partly co-adapted with Denisse Pfeiffer)
- Mi Destino Eres Tú (with Cristina García)
- Quiero amarte (with Cristina García)
- Tres mujeres (with Cristina García)
- Y mañana será otro día (with Cristina García)

== Prizes and nominations ==
=== Premios TVyNovelas ===
Year	Category	Soap opera	Result
2013	TVyNovelas Award for Best Original Story or Adaptation	Amor bravío	Win
2010	TVyNovelas Award for Best Original Story or Adaptation	En Nombre Del Amor	Nominated
