= Chris Pazcal =

Mexican actor (born 1993)

- Born: Christopher Pazcal Ancira; 16 May 1993 (age 33); Mexico City, Mexico
- Occupation: Actor
- Years active: 2014–present
- Mother: Magda Karina
- Relatives: Karina Duprez (grandmother); Magda Guzmán (great-grandmother)

Christopher Pazcal Ancira (born 16 May 1993), known professionally as Chris Pazcal, is a Mexican actor best known for his roles in telenovelas.

== Career ==
Pazcal was born on 16 May 1993, a descendant of a dynasty of actors, directors and writers, being the son of actress Magda Karina, grandson of director Karina Duprez and great-grandson of Magda Guzmán and Julián Duprez. He began his career appearing in the short films The Labyrinth of Minos, Escape and One Last Story. In 2015, he wrote and directed the short film Behind the Silence.

Pazcal's first television appearance was in 2018 when he was cast in the telenovela Y mañana será otro día, alongside Angélica Vale, Diego Olivera and Alejandra Barros; his grandmother Karina Duprez, was one of the directors of the telenovela. He then appeared in several telenovelas in recurring roles, including Cita a ciegas and Fuego ardiente. In 2021, Pazcal played Ricardo Manríque de Castro, one of the antagonists of the telenovela Diseñando tu amor. In 2022, he appeared in Mi secreto, portraying Gabino Ocampo. In 2024, Pazcal was cast in Fugitivas, en busca de la libertad, where he played Darío Estrada.

In 2025, Pazcal landed his first lead role in a telenovela in Regalo de amor. In the telenovela, he portrayed Eugenio de la Vega Mondragón. Later that year, he played Mateo Lizárraga Arenas, the main antagonist of Mi verdad oculta.

== Filmography ==
Film roles
| Year | Title | Role | Notes |
|---|---|---|---|
| 2014 | Subscribe | Christian | |
| 2014 | Labyrinth of Minos | Theseus | Short film |
| 2014 | Escape | Guard | Short film |
| 2015 | One Last Story | Captain Orz | Short film |
| 2015 | Behind the Silence | Director and writer | Short film |
| 2018 | The Command | Niko | |

Television roles
| Year | Title | Role | Notes |
|---|---|---|---|
| 2018 | Y mañana será otro día | Pablo Yáñez | Recurring role |
| 2019 | Por amar sin ley | Erick Galván | Guest star (season 2) |
| 2019 | Cita a ciegas | César | Recurring role |
| 2020 | Rubí | Gatillo | Recurring role |
| 2020 | Esta historia me suena | Darío | Episode: "Amiga mía" |
| 2021 | Fuego ardiente | David Arana | Recurring role |
| 2021 | Diseñando tu amor | Ricardo Manríque de Castro | Main cast |
| 2022-2023 | Mi secreto | Gabino Ocampo | Main cast |
| 2024 | Fugitivas, en busca de la libertad | Darío Estrada | Main cast |
| 2025 | Valiendo Madres | Waldo | Main cast |
| 2025 | Regalo de amor | Eugenio de la Vega Mondragón | Lead role |
| 2025-2026 | Mi verdad oculta | Mateo Lizárraga Arenas | Main cast |

Theater
| Year | Title | Role | Director | Venue |
|---|---|---|---|---|
| 2018 | Si mi amor, lo que tú digas | Miguel | Sebastián Sánchez Amunátegui | Teatro Rafael Solana |
| 2023 | Así de simple | Joaquín | Jorge Seleme | Teatro Centenario Coyoacán |
| 2025 | Siete vece adios | Él | Alan Estrada | Teatro Ramiro Jiménez |
