= Tomorrow is a New Day =

Mexican telenovela

- Genre: Telenovela
- Based on: Cuenta conmigo by José Ignacio Valenzuela
- Written by: Martha Carrillo; Cristina García; Edwin Valencia
- Directed by: Lily Garza; Fernando Nesme; Karina Duprez
- Starring: Angélica Vale; Diego Olivera; Alejandra Barros
- Opening theme: "Insomnio" by Aleks Syntek
- Country of origin: Mexico
- Original language: Spanish
- No. of seasons: 1
- No. of episodes: 77

Production
- Executive producer: Carlos Moreno
- Camera setup: Multi-camera
- Production company: Televisa

Original release
- Network: Las Estrellas
- Release: 16 April – 29 July 2018

Tomorrow is a New Day (Spanish title: Y mañana será otro día; stylized onscreen as Y mañana será otro día... mejor) is a Mexican telenovela produced by Carlos Moreno premiered on Las Estrellas on 16 April 2018. It is an adaptation of the 2009 Chilean telenovela Cuenta conmigo created by José Ignacio Valenzuela. The production started on February 26, 2018 at Forum 11 of Televisa San Ángel. It stars Angélica Vale as the main character.

== Plot ==
The series revolves around Mónica Rojas (Angélica Vale), a secretary dedicated entirely to her work in Media Link, the company founded and led by Camilo Sarmiento (Diego Olivera). Monica is not only responsible for the professional agenda of her boss, but also of his personal life, which includes his wife Diana (Alejandra Barros) and their children. Since Mónica meets Camilo, she falls deeply in love, even knowing that her love has no hope. But her love expectations will change, when Diana proposes to her to fall in love with Camilo when she dies due to a serious illness.

== Cast ==
- Angélica Vale as Mónica Rojas
- Diego Olivera as Camilo Sarmiento
- Alejandra Barros as Diana Alcántara Lazcano de Sarmiento
- Nuria Bages as Eugenia
- Ana Layevska as Margarita Rojas de González
- Fabián Robles as Adrián
- Diego de Erice as Manuel González
- Fernanda Borches as Laura
- Emmanuel Palomares as Rafael de la Maza
- Florencia del Saracho as Ximena Izaguirre
- Mauricio Abularach as Mauricio
- Socorro Bonilla as Chabela
- Estefanía Villarreal as Nora Solé
- Andrea Escalona as Lidia
- Miranda Kay as Regina Sarmiento
- Lizy Martínez as Bárbara "Barbie" Sarmiento
- Oliver Nava as Cristóbal
- Ari Placera as Nicólas "Nico" Sarmiento
- Chris Pazcal as Pablo
- Luis José Sevilla as Luis
- Sergio Saldívar as Dr. Juan
- Miguel Díaz-Morlet as Armando
- Alejandro Cervantes as Ferchi
- Sergio Madrigal as Damián
- Rocío Padilla as Paloma
- Monserrat Jiménez as Cristina Rivapalacios
- Janeth Ponzo as Pilar Embil
- Luis Hacha as Iñaki de la Maza
- Ana La Salvia as Almudena Cervantes
- Macaria as Mercedes Garza
- Leo Deluglio as El Killer

== Rating ==
| Season | Timeslot (CT) | Episodes | First aired | | Last aired | |
| Season | Timeslot (CT) | Episodes | Date | Premiere Ratings | Date | Finale Ratings |
|---|---|---|---|---|---|---|
| 1 | Mon–Fri 4:30pm | 77 | 16 April 2018 | 22.90 | 29 July 2018 | TBD |
