= Diseñando tu amor =

Mexican telenovela

- Genre: Telenovela
- Based on: Meu Amor by António Barreira
- Written by: Guillermo Quezada Correa; José Enrique Jiménez Díaz; Oscar Ortíz de Pinedo; Gabriel Rojas Carrillo
- Directed by: Juan Carlos Muñoz; Guido Sánchez; José Manuel Fernández
- Starring: Gala Montes; Juan Diego Covarrubias; Sergio Goyri; Ana Belena; Osvaldo de León; María Sorté
- Opening theme: "Un amor a la medida" by Gala Montes
- Composers: J. Eduardo Murguía; Mauricio L. Arriaga
- Country of origin: Mexico
- Original language: Spanish
- No. of seasons: 1
- No. of episodes: 120

Production
- Executive producer: Pedro Ortiz de Pinedo
- Producer: Liliana Cuesta Aguirre
- Production company: Televisa

Original release
- Network: Las Estrellas; Univision
- Release: 26 April – 8 October 2021

Diseñando tu amor (English title: The Thread of Love) is a Mexican telenovela that premiered on Las Estrellas and Univision on 26 April 2021. It ended on Las Estrellas on 8 October 2021. The series is produced by Pedro Ortiz de Pinedo. It is an adaptation of the Portuguese telenovela Meu Amor created by António Barreira, and stars an ensemble cast led by Gala Montes, Juan Diego Covarrubias, Sergio Goyri, Ana Belena, Osvaldo de León, and María Sorté. The series revolves around Valentina (Gala Montes) and Nora (Ale Müller), two sisters, with different personalities, who share the desire to stand out in the world of the fashion industry.

== Plot ==
Valentina (Gala Montes) is a young woman who dreams of succeeding in the world of fashion. She works in a pasteurizing factory belonging to Ricardo's (Chris Pazcal) family, who makes her believe that he will help her fulfill her dream, but only wants to take advantage of her and has put a large sum of money in her name, which he has stolen from his father (Marco Muñóz). Valentina and Ricardo's plan to escape is discovered, which will condemn Ricardo to take a trip alongside his father Armando, a successful businessman who does not forgive the betrayal of his son and who threatens to send him to jail as well as his accomplice. Unfortunately the trip turns into a tragedy as the plane suffers an accident. Ricardo loses his memory, disappears and is presumed dead. After losing her boyfriend as well as her father (Adalberto Parra) in the accident, Valentina and her sister Nora (Ale Müller) will arrive to Mexico City looking for their uncle Horacio (José Elías Moreno), where they meet Claudio (Juan Diego Covarrubias), Horacio's adoptive son. Claudio is a noble man who as a lawyer will help the members of his community with the legal problems they will face. Immediately the flame of love will light between Valentina and Claudio after meeting, but Nora will try to get in the way to win over Claudio. Valentina tries to make it on her own and find a job at the fashion house of Yolanda Pratas (Frances Ondiviela), a famous designer. Valentina shows great talent but due to her naivety, she allows her designs to be stolen and is fired. Claudio discovers Valentina's ability to design and takes her to Helena's (Ana Belena) workshop, without imagining that a family mystery will unite them for life. Ricardo recovers his memory and looks for Valentina, surprising everyone with the news that he did not die in the tragic plane crash, however is revealed to have his own agenda with Valentina.

== Cast ==
=== Main ===
- Gala Montes as Valentina Fuentes Barrios
- Juan Diego Covarrubias as Claudio Barrios
- Sergio Goyri as Guillermo Vargas Mota
- Ana Belena as Helena Vargas Reyna
- Osvaldo de León as Héctor Casanova Morales
- María Sorté as Consuelo Morales
- Martha Julia as Patricia Manrique de Castro
- Norma Herrera as Adelaida Vargas Villaponte
- Ale Müller as Nora Fuentes Barrios
- Omar Germenos as Alfonso Vargas Reyna
- Frances Ondiviela as Yolanda Pratas
- Chris Pazcal as Ricardo Manrique de Castro
- Armando Araiza as Enrique Avilés Ortega
- Adrián Di Monte as Leonardo Casanova Morales
- Adalberto Parra as Juan Fuentes
- Mariluz Bermúdez as Rosa María Ponce
- Marco Muñóz as Armando Manrique de Castro
- Daniela Álvarez as María José "Majo" Arriaga
- Ana Lorena Elorduy as Camila Casanova Morales
- Alejandra Jurado as Madre Superiora
- Archie Lanfranco as Ernesto
- Talia Rivera as Luna
- Raúl Orvañanos as Uriel
- Isabela Vázquez as Mina Casanova
- José Elías Moreno as Horacio Barrios

=== Recurring ===
- Natalia Madera as Beba
- Bibelot Mansur as Samara
- Emmanuel Torres as Chango
- Alfonso Escobedo as Bicho
- Diego Arancivia as El Cachas
- Carlos Meza as Mosquito
- Sergio Arturo Ruiz as El Perro
- Moisés Peñaloza as Brochas
- Carlos Miguel as Regino
- Manrique Ferrer as Cibernético
- Thabata González as Lucha
- Marcos Neta as Arcadio
- Flora Fernández as Mechita
- Tabata Campos as Lizia

== Production ==
The telenovela was announced on 15 October 2020 at Visión21 upfront. The cast was revealed in January 2021. Production began on 28 January 2021, and ended on 11 August 2021.

== Ratings ==
=== Mexico ratings ===
Season	Timeslot (CT)	Episodes	First aired		Last aired	
Season	Timeslot (CT)	Episodes	Date	Viewers (millions)	Date	Viewers (millions)
1	Mon–Fri 4:30 p.m.	120	26 April 2021	2.3	8 October 2021	3.2

=== U.S. ratings ===
Viewership and ratings per season of Diseñando tu amor
Season	Timeslot (ET)	Episodes	First aired		Last aired		Avg. viewers (millions)
Season	Timeslot (ET)	Episodes	Date	Viewers (millions)	Date	Viewers (millions)	Avg. viewers (millions)
1	Mon–Fri 8:00 p.m.	120	26 April 2021	1.57	19 October 2021	1.76	1.45

== Episodes ==
No.	Title	Mexico air date	U.S. air date	U.S. viewers (millions)
1	"Aléjate del hijo del patrón"	26 April 2021 (Note: Premiered early online through Las Estrellas website on 23 April 2021.)	26 April 2021	1.58
Claudio arrives at the hacienda in search of Don Armando, but upon arrival he meets Valentina and Nora. Valentina asks Ricardo to try to defend their relationship, but he assures her that no one can confront his father, Don Armando. Alfonso meets with Helena and her father in a restaurant in order for them to reconcile, but things don't go the way he expected. Nora confesses to Patricia that Ricardo and Valentina plan to escape, so she informs her father and prevents them from escaping. Valentina confronts Patricia and assures her that out of dignity she does not accept the money she is trying to offer her, after kicking them out of the ranch. Don Armando discovers that Ricardo stole money from him and confronts him during the flight. Valentina has a bad feeling.
2	"Una de las dos es su hija"	27 April 2021	27 April 2021	1.60
After the plane crash, Don Armando confesses to Ricardo that he is not his father, since his mother cheated on him with a driver and assures him that if it had not been for Patricia, he would have let him die. Valentina and Nora find out that their father died along with Ricardo and his family. Nora blames Valentina for the accident and assures her that if she had done things right with Ricardo, he would be alive by now. Consuelo hopes that her daughter Camila is alive. Juan reveals to Guillermo that Valentina or Nora is his daughter. Aledaila asks Helena to reconcile with her father, just as Alfonso wished.
3	"Por tu culpa mi hermano está muerto"	28 April 2021	28 April 2021	1.24
When Patricia sees Valentina and Nora arrive at her family's wake, she kicks them out and does not hesitate to humiliate them. Patricia assures Nora that she is willing to reveal that she was the one who told her that Valentina and Ricardo were going to escape. Valentina and Nora meet Guillermo at a bad time. Nora assures Valentina that she does not trust Patricia's help, so she convinces her that the best thing for both of them is to start a new life in the city. Guillermo arrives at the hacienda in search of Valentina and Nora. Valentina assures Nora that if she finds out that she had made her plans with Ricardo known, she will never forgive her, since she would become the culprit of the death of the man she loves.
4	"No te he olvidado ni un minuto"	29 April 2021	29 April 2021	1.40
Guillermo confesses to Enrique that Valentina or Nora, one of the two young women, may be his daughter. Helena informs Claudio that Juan, who could help him know the name of the woman who stole his heart, died in the plane crash, but he is willing to return to the ranch to look for her. Valentina arrives at her uncle Horacio's house in search of accommodation, but she meets Claudio who cannot believe that he is again in front of the woman who stole his heart. Horacio doubts that Valentina and Nora are his nieces, since he never knew of their existence. Claudio manages to convince his father that Valentina and Nora stay to live as long as necessary at home. Helena relives the beautiful moments she spent with her brother Alfonso.
5	"Héctor y Helena se besan"	30 April 2021	30 April 2021	1.37
Guillermo assures Helena that Alfonso is no longer here, so her presence at her brother's funeral is not essential. Valentina shows Claudio the audio that Ricardo sent her before he died. Claudio, upon learning that they unjustifiably fired Valentina and Nora from the ranch, is willing to help them to sue Patricia. Héctor questions Helena if she is willing to give herself a chance in love. Valentina is willing to sue Patricia for wrongful termination. Guillermo assures Adelaida that when he finds his daughter, she will inherit his entire fortune. Valentina learns that after signing the documents, she cleared the airline of any responsibility, so they will not be compensated. Claudio confesses to Valentina that she is an extraordinary woman and she assures him that he became her angel. Ricardo is alive.
6	"Loco de amor por ti"	3 May 2021	3 May 2021	1.53
Seeing that no family member has asked about Ricardo, Dr. Mario assures Dr. Rosa that it is best to let him die, since there is no one who can cover hospital expenses. Valentina decides to go out to find work since she does not want to become a burden for her uncle, she finds the opportunity to enter a tailor shop, but the owner of the place begins to harass her. Nora discovers that Claudio is interested in Valentina. Camila wakes up from the coma. Claudio surprises Valentina with a bouquet of flowers and assures her that he is crazy in love with her. Patricia learns that her father owed Helena a large amount of money.
7	"Bienvenida al Olimpo de la moda"	4 May 2021	4 May 2021	1.50
Valentina assures Claudio that there cannot be a romance between them, since they are first cousins, but he confesses that he is not Horacio's son. Nora asks Valentina to forget about Ricardo. Nora confesses to Claudio that since she met him she liked him and although she knows that he is not going to notice her because he is thinking about Valentina, she assures him that she is willing to wait as long as necessary. Héctor is annoyed by Leonardo's indifference to their sister Camila's situation. Claudio confesses to Horacio that he fell in love with Valentina from the day he met her. Valentina apologizes to Claudio and assures him that if she falls in love again it will be with him. Helena finds out that Yolanda Pratas invited models and designers to work in her workshop, just the same day that she is going to do the casting at her workshop. Yolanda seeing Valentina's designs decides to give her a job as her apprentice. Helena believes that someone on her team is betraying her.
8	"Un ángel que Dios puso en su camino"	5 May 2021	5 May 2021	1.37
Valentina meets Guillermo who is in poor health so she tries to help him. Patricia meets with the town's father who gives her the address of Valentina and Nora's uncle. Ricardo wakes up from the coma and Dr. Rosa begins to ask him a series of questions, but he doesn't remember who he is. Helena asks Héctor not to play with her feelings. Adelaida, knowing that Patricia did not hear from Valentina and Nora, asks her to stop looking for them because if she finds them, her future will change. Nora dreams of becoming a great model. Patricia makes Guillermo believe that Valentina and Nora went undocumented to the United States, but he asks her to do everything possible to find their whereabouts. Patricia assures Enrique that Valentina or Nora, one of them may be Guillermo's daughter, hence his insistence on finding them. Helena meets Valentina, but Yolanda confronts her by discovering her with her designs.
9	"No muerdas la mano que te da de comer"	6 May 2021	6 May 2021	1.36
Valentina and Claudio are in the kitchen and without saying a single word they show their love with a kiss. Nora threatens Leonardo with a knife, thinking that he is a criminal, but he assures her that he is Consuelo's son. After the scare, Nora tells Leonardo that she is a model and he hands her his card to look for him. Valentina knows that Yolanda is lying about meeting with Helena. Ricardo feels very grateful for the attention of his doctor. After learning that Yolanda is telling lies about what happened with Helena, Valentina is hesitating to continue at Olimpo Pratas. Helena is willing to confess the truth, but Claudio assures her that she needs the proof to the contrary, this situation could be her exit from the world of fashion. Helena finds out that Yolanda is accusing her of theft, since according to her, she wanted to appropriate her designs. Camila confesses to Claudio that she wants to become a nun. Leonardo is ready to betray Helena. Leonardo invites Helena a glass of wine and she faints. Ricardo has a hallucination with Valentina, but the doctor, seeing him so desperate, helps him and he kisses her.
10	"Un arma secreta"	7 May 2021	7 May 2021	1.08
Nora finds her sister kissing Claudio, but he tries to justify what she saw. Valentina confesses to Nora that she feels confused. Majo believes that Leonardo drugged Helena to rape her. Helena looks for Leonardo to explain what happened last night in her apartment, when he feels attacked, he signs his resignation and asks to be sued for sexual abuse and attempted rape. Consuelo and Horacio are about to kiss, but are interrupted by Nora. Beba in a haughty attitude asks Valentina to tell her what she talked about with Yolanda, but she assures her that it is something that does not interest her. Valentina hides to prevent Patricia from discovering her. Adelaida plans to move in with Helena. Camila shares with Nora that she will no longer be able to return to modeling, after her face was affected by the accident, Nora assures her that she should think about looking for a job where no one will see her. Ricardo learns that the hospital will cover his expenses. Patricia shares with Yolanda that she is not going to allow Helena to take her property from her, so Yolanda joins her and confesses that she has her support. Valentina asks Beba to make amends for the good of the two, but they are surprised in Olimpo Pratas by some criminals.
11	"No podía dejar de pensar en ti"	10 May 2021	10 May 2021	1.32
A group of armed men enter Yolanda's office in search of the safe, but Beba, upon seeing the criminals, decides to run away, putting her life in danger; however, Valentina defends her. Yolanda confesses to Patricia that she did not marry Guillermo because of Helena. Majo and Leonardo become friends with benefits. Yolanda blames Valentina for being an accomplice of the criminals, since she found out that she ate with Helena Vargas' lawyer, but Valentina makes it clear that this is not true and if she mistrusts her, it is best to resign, not without before telling Claudio the whole truth about Yolanda's photos. Adelaida confirms to Patricia that Valentina or Nora is Guillermo's daughter, so he is willing to leave her all his fortune. Patricia asks Adelaida that Helena cannot know that she has a sister. Valentina confesses to Claudio that when she was in the assault she couldn't stop thinking about him, so Claudio kisses her to calm her. Helena arrives at Héctor's house and meets Mina.
12	"Voy a acabar contigo, Valentina"	11 May 2021	11 May 2021	1.45
Helena seeks an explanation from Héctor for having hidden from her that he has a daughter and assures Majo that she does not know if she is willing to fight a battle with Mina's jealousy. Camila tells Héctor that Helena went to look for him and she already knows he's father, so she makes it clear that children should not be hidden. Ricardo has slight memories of a woman. Valentina gives Yolanda the designs for the fashion show and when she sees her work she is willing to steal them and make life miserable for her apprentice. Héctor tells Helena that he hadn't had the opportunity to tell her about his daughter and makes a strong confession to her. Helena asks Héctor for time and he does not accept the decision so he decides to leave from her life. Ricardo convinces Rosa to take the position as director of the hospital. Leonardo asks Helena not to make a catalog for fat women and she assures him that she was overweight a few years ago. Valentina arrives at Yolanda's office and discovers that she stole the idea and concepts from her designs for the fashion show. Enrique tells Claudio that Guillermo wants to buy the farm from Helena.
13	"Hacerse el héroe"	12 May 2021	12 May 2021	1.36
Leonardo turns himself in to the authorities after he accepted that he hit the photojournalist. Adelaida tells Patricia about Guillermo's relationship with Yolanda. Guillermo sees Valentina again, but while wanting to thank her for what she did for him, he can't reach her. Camila tells Valentina that her father sat next to her on the day of the accident and tells her his last words. Héctor, upon learning that his brother is detained, confesses that he was the one who hit the reporter. Claudio informs Helena and Héctor that Leonardo will be transferred to the prison. Claudio surprises Valentina with a bouquet of flowers. Helena decides to give Héctor another chance. Beba arrives at Valentina's house and asks her to give her Yolanda's jewels, so surprised, Valentina takes them out of her pants pocket.
14	"Todos son mi familia"	13 May 2021	14 May 2021	1.34
Beba arrives at Valentina's house to accuse her of stealing Yolanda's gold buttons and diamond brooch, but Horacio comes to his niece's defense and tells Beba to leave. Patricia tells Guillermo that it is rumored in the town that Valentina and Nora died while trying to cross the border by river. Leonardo asks Helena to cancel the fashion show since this way they will avoid a humiliation from Yolanda, in addition to the fact that they are not prepared either with the models or with the advertising campaign. Yolanda continues to use Valentina's ideas. Patricia shares with Adelaida that Father Damien will attest that Valentina and Nora are missing. Valentina confronts Beba and assures her that she was willing to tell Yolanda everything about the alleged robbery, but she did not let her. Claudio convinces Helena to do the fashion show. Yolanda is willing to destroy Valentina as she sees her as a great opponent and asks Beba that when she wants to kill her enemy, she must find the perfect moment to destroy them.
15	"¿Quieres ser mi novia?"	14 May 2021	17 May 2021	1.33
Patricia arrives at the hacienda and with a broken voice assures Héctor that she is going to lose it, since Helena plans to take it away. Ricardo undergoes hypnosis and with the help of Dr. Rosa María begins to remember events in his life. Mina is jealous of Helena. Valentina surprises Nora by taking her to a modeling school. Helena, when leaving Consuelo's house, runs into Valentina and confronts her, assuring her that she is a liar, since nothing she declared was true, Valentina tries to explain what happened, but Helena decides not to listen to her. Patricia invites Héctor to swim in the river. During dinner, Claudio promises Valentina that he will never leave her life, so he will take care of her forever. Helena begins preparations for her fashion show. Claudio asks Valentina to be his girlfriend. Yolanda begins her plan against Valentina and fires her from Olimpo Pratas.
16	"¿El camino fácil o el difícil?"	17 May 2021	18 May 2021	1.36
Yolanda is willing to accuse Valentina of theft, so she assures her that she awaits the lawsuit from her lawyer. Beba celebrates that Valentina no longer works for Yolanda and does not hesitate to humiliate her. Valentina promises herself that she will not allow anyone to continue making fun of her. Claudio confronts Yolanda and assures her that Valentina is not alone. Héctor suspects that Leonardo and the paparazzi are accomplices. Camila gives Nora modeling classes. Camila visits Helena in the workshop and she gives her a warm welcome. Valentina becomes fond of a baby from the orphanage and assures Claudio that someone must adopt her.
17	"¿Te quieres casar conmigo?"	18 May 2021	19 May 2021	1.27
Héctor confirms to Patricia that Helena is his girlfriend, so he asks her not to mention that they are friends, since she could misunderstand them. Valentina is determined to adopt Fátima, but Claudio assures her that it is not the time. Regino and Gil prepare their revenge against Horacio. Valentina is devastated to learn that Fátima is alone in the world, so she is willing to help her find parents to take care of her. Claudio, seeing that Valentina wants to adopt Fátima, proposes marriage so that in this way both of them can take care of the baby. Patricia learns that Guillermo will take over all of her father's businesses after he failed to pay him the loan.
18	"Sí me quiero casar contigo"	19 May 2021	20 May 2021	1.20
Valentina agrees to formalize her relationship with Claudio and he assures her that he gives her the ring that belonged to his mother. Guillermo reveals to Patricia that he will sell the pasteurizer so she is practically broke, Patricia feels betrayed by Enrique. Ricardo manages to remember Valentina's phone number and decides to call her, but when she sees that they only call her to annoy her, she asks to be left alone. Nora finds out that her sister is going to marry Claudio. Patricia, seeing that she practically stayed on the street, asks her Yolanda for a job, who names her as the new Artistic Director of Olimpo Pratas. Leonardo is released from prison and Héctor discovers that the paparazzi is his brother's accomplice. Valentina confesses to her uncle Horacio that she will never forget Ricardo.
19	"¿Qué haces tú aquí?"	20 May 2021	21 May 2021	1.30
Beba, feeling displaced in Olimpo Pratas, gives her resignation to Yolanda. Leonardo returns to the workshop and finds out that Helena is going to participate in fashion week. Valentina is saddened to learn that there are already families interested in adopting Fátima. Nora assures Valentina that if she marries Claudio it will ruin her plans, so she is willing to leave the house when she starts working. With Rosa María's help, Ricardo returns to the ranch and is reunited with Patricia, who cannot believe that her brother is alive. Valentina asks Helena for a job, who reacts annoyed when she sees her in her workshop.
20	"Ahora o nunca"	21 May 2021	24 May 2021	1.36
Helena, upon discovering that Valentina is in her workshop, kicks her out, without letting her give her an explanation. Patricia, seeing that it is not a dream and that her brother is actually alive, gives him a hug. Claudio informs Enrique that Helena agreed to sell the ranch, but under one condition. Ricardo calls Valentina's phone again, but Nora answers and assures her that she is going to sue him for harassment. Ricardo refuses to believe that Valentina is dead. Claudio finds out that Valentina asked Helena for a job and she treated her very badly. Yolanda is surprised to see Helena arrive with Héctor to the gala dinner for fashion week and does not hesitate to confront her, but she does not remain silent. Nora makes Claudio jealous of Ricardo, after Valentina refused his help. Nora is determined to start her modeling career, so she contacts Leonardo to ask for his help and assures him that she is ready for anything. Patricia discovers that Rosa María fell in love with Ricardo and does not hesitate to speak ill of Valentina. Helena sees Valentina's designs again and agrees to give her a job as a seamstress.
21	"Veo gente muerta"	24 May 2021	25 May 2021	1.48
Leonardo plans to support Nora in her modeling career, only under her conditions. Helena believes that her relationship with Valentina cannot be a good one. Majo shows Helena the news circulating about the relationship with Héctor. Adelaida and Guillermo still do not believe that Ricardo is alive. Valentina thinks she sees Ricardo alive, but Nora makes fun of her. Helena won't let Yolanda ruin her plans. Guillermo is reunited with Ricardo, but Patricia has a plan to keep the Vargas's inheritance. Héctor does not care about what is published in the media about him and Helena.
22	"¡Estás vivo!"	25 May 2021	26 May 2021	1.32
Patricia surprises Héctor in Helena's apartment. Helena is jealous of Patricia's closeness to Héctor, which will put their relationship at risk. Ricardo looks for Camila without knowing that Valentina is at her home, and leaves everyone speechless. Ricardo and Claudio confront each other for the love of Valentina, but neither thinks of leaving her. Ricardo hides from Patricia about his reunion with Valentina. Claudio wants to know what will happen in his relationship with Valentina now that Ricardo has returned and she confesses that she feels nothing for Ricardo.
23	"Mía o de nadie"	26 May 2021	26 May 2021	1.32
Valentina and Claudio continue with the wedding plans, but she needs to talk to Ricardo about what happened in the time he disappeared. Helena takes Valentina by surprise by assigning her as an assistant seamstress. Horacio breaks the oath he made to his father. Valentina reveals to Ricardo that their relationship cannot continue. Helena sells the ranch to Guillermo and he asks her never to see each other again. Ricardo does not assimilate that Valentina is with another man. Claudio doubts if Valentina is still in love with Ricardo. Valentina is surprised to see her sister at Helena's fashion house.
24	"Tomar propias decisiones"	27 May 2021	27 May 2021	1.20
Valentina does not accept that Nora works as a model, but Nora assures her that nothing will prevent it. Guillermo succeeds in business, but fears that his health will prevent all the plans he has. Valentina asks Leonardo not to play with her sister's feelings. Ricardo reveals to Rosa María about his meeting with Valentina and asks for her help to win her back. Ricardo fears for his health after the attacks he suffers. Leonardo has a warning for Nora before making her a model. Helena will not allow her father to continue hurting her. Helena plans to fight for Héctor's love after meeting who Patricia works for. Valentina and Claudio have to take Fátima to the hospital and discover that she may lose her sight. Nora has a hard time getting Helena to accept her into her fashion house. Rosa María requests Patricia's help to get Valentina away from Ricardo. Patricia arrives at the Barrios' house to speak with Héctor, but she could get a surprise with Valentina.
25	"Ardiente belleza"	28 May 2021	27 May 2021	1.20
Ricardo cannot bear the idea that Valentina is going to marry Claudio and thinks about preventing the marriage. Patricia arrives at the Barrios home, but Valentina remains hidden for fear of what might happen. Nora tries to persuade Valentina to stay by Ricardo's side because of his health condition. Leonardo announces to Helena that there is a campaign with Camila's Image, but without her consent, and Claudio is identified as the culprit. The adoption of Fátima is at risk due to the kiss that the mother superior witnesses between Valentina and Ricardo. Claudio is willing to go to the lengths to find the culprit who authorized the campaign. Rosa María questions Ricardo about his feelings for Valentina. Yolanda Pratas calls the press to point out Helena for what she did with Camila's image. Helena faces questions from the press and Camila decides to support her.
26	"Ponerle un alto"	31 May 2021	28 May 2021	1.28
Camila defends Helena in front of the press to clear her name and Yolanda is left as a liar. Ricardo meets Valentina in Helena's workshop and does not hesitate to speak to her as if she were his property. Claudio suspects that Leonardo is sabotaging Helena. Guillermo does not lose hope of finding his daughter. Valentina confesses to Claudio that Ricardo kissed her in front of the mother superior. Patricia confesses to Adelaida that she witnessed how her father killed her mother, so she asks him not to tell Ricardo about his past. Leonardo informs Nora that Helena gave her a job as a model. Ricardo communicates with Valentina and asks to see her to fix the misunderstandings. Enrique confesses to Ricardo that Patricia treated Valentina very badly on the day of his wake.
27	"Nadie sabe lo que tiene hasta que lo pierde"	1 June 2021	28 May 2021	1.28
Adelaida confesses to Helena that Guillermo has a daughter that he is looking for. Ricardo asks Nora to help him so that Valentina gets back together with him and does not hesitate to kiss her to convince her. Consuelo takes advantage of the fact that she is alone with Valentina and confesses that Yolanda Pratas stole her designs when she worked as her seamstress, but now she is afraid that Yolanda will take revenge for what happened in the past. Yolanda is sure that Consuelo is paying with her daughter Camila, for all the damage that she caused her in the past. Yolanda threatens Adelaida and she assures her that she is not afraid of her. Patricia warns Yolanda that Helena can sue her for moral damages. Valentina wants to help Ricardo and Nora manipulates her into giving him another chance.
28	"Atacar con las mismas armas"	2 June 2021	31 May 2021	1.32
Helena lets Nora know that she must prepare as a model so that in a few years she can shine on the catwalks and assures her that she gave her the opportunity just because she was Claudio's cousin. Ricardo calls Valentina's phone and Claudio listens to everything he says to his girlfriend. Yolanda informs the press that she will launch a men's clothing line with Ricardo as a model. Valentina informs Helena that Yolanda created the same concept for fashion week. Helena wants to cast Hector as a model. Valentina proposes to Helena that the concept of her runway be called “Honor” so she accepts it. Claudio assures Valentina that he is afraid of losing her. Leonardo learns that Helena accepted Nora.
29	"Unidos por un accidente"	3 June 2021	31 May 2021	1.32
Helena cannot forgive Héctor for spending the night with Patricia, but he assures her that nothing happened. Claudio confesses to Valentina that Ricardo's health condition is serious. Ricardo arrives at Valentina's house and runs into Camila, the woman whose life he saved. Nora calls Valentina a hypocrite since she does not feel her support now that she wants to launch herself as a model and reproaches her for all her attention being with Fátima. When Valentina sees that Leonardo raises his voice to her sister, she slaps him and forbids him to speak to Nora like that. Patricia vows revenge on Enrique after he betrayed her. Helena wants to avoid at all costs that Yolanda finds out that she no artistic director.
30	"Exhibir como trofeo"	4 June 2021	1 June 2021	1.46
Patricia proposes to Yolanda that she and Beba organize the fashion show, since she does not trust the artistic director. Héctor advises Claudio to fight for Valentina, otherwise he may regret his bad decisions. Majo arrives at Leonardo's office and finds him with Nora so she warns him that if Helena finds out, she is capable of firing Valentina's sister. Camila looks for Ricardo. Nora assures Héctor that Helena only wants to display him as her trophy at the fashion show, since she wants to compete with Yolanda, who is going to launch Ricardo as a model. Ricardo has a relapse and momentarily loses his memory, a situation that puts him in danger. Rosa María assures Ricardo that she is not going to lend herself to his mysteries and secrets, so if he is willing for her to stay, she asks him to speak the truth. Valentina and Claudio find out that Fátima is on the verge of death.
31	"Con la frente en alto"	7 June 2021	2 June 2021	1.40
Brochas' gang arrives at Horacio's house and Valentina recognizes one of them. Camila refuses to undergo surgery to be able to model. Ricardo meets with Nora to ask for her help and thus prevent Valentina's wedding, but she does not think it is an easy situation. Héctor arrives for the appointment with Yolanda and Patricia, but questions them about their relationship with Helena. Helena arrives at the same restaurant where Héctor is with Patricia and Yolanda, but she finds her boyfriend kissing her ex-sister-in-law. Guillermo will begin to investigate Ricardo. Helena, upon discovering Héctor's deception, is determined to break up with him, so Majo advises her to speak up and tell him things head-on. Claudio surprises Valentina with a gift.
32	"Punto sin retorno"	8 June 2021	4 June 2021	1.34
Valentina, seeing that Rosa María is taking advantage of the moment with Claudio, falls into Ricardo's game. Ricardo challenges Claudio that he is not going to marry Valentina and tempers are tense. Helena believes that Hector spent the night with Patricia. Valentina, upon discovering that Nora is beginning to have eating problems, threatens to tell Helena and assures her that Helena is capable of firing her, as it could get her into trouble. Ricardo tries to recover the money that he put in Valentina’s name. Horacio reveals Chelito's letters and is sure that he must get rid of them, for the sake of his nieces. Consuelo asks Helena not to allow Camila to participate in the fashion show, as that could cause serious health problems. Ricardo contacts the Fátima’s mother.
33	"Pagar los platos rotos"	9 June 2021	7 June 2021	1.29
Rosa María tries to victimize Ricardo in front of Valentina and Claudio for his illness and assures them that in one of his episodes he may lose his memory and never recover it again. Valentina meets Ricardo in the park and he asks her to resume their plans. Claudio is uneasy to learn that his fiancée is with Ricardo. Valentina discovers that it was Nora who revealed that she was going to escape with Ricardo, so she slaps her for feeling betrayed. Ricardo is determined to prevent Valentina's wedding with Claudio. After feeling attacked by her sister, Nora swears to take revenge with what hurts her the most. Héctor is upset that Leonardo wants to help Mina with her business.
34	"Tú y yo no somos hermanas"	10 June 2021	8 June 2021	1.22
Camila thinks she is in love with Ricardo. Patricia sets a trap for Guillermo to turn him against Enrique. Nora assures Valentina that she was unable to reveal all her plans to Ricardo's family, since from the beginning she always supported her, a situation that makes Valentina feel bad. Patricia looks for Helena to make her jealous with Héctor. Ricardo warns Claudio that the love that exists between him and Valentina continues to grow. Valentina feels very guilty about what happened with Nora, so she needs to apologize, but her uncle Horacio advises her that it is not the time. Nora begins her plan for revenge against her sister. Yolanda leaves Patricia out of her project. Guillermo realizes that Enrique was trying to steal from him by signing some documents in which he proves that he is the owner of everything. Nora leaves her uncle Horacio's house.
35	"Cría cuervos y te sacarán los ojos"	11 June 2021	9 June 2021	1.25
After leaving her uncle Horacio's house, Nara comes to live with Leonardo, but he accepts her only under one condition. Patricia celebrates that her plan turned out as she expected. Guillermo threatens Enrique with a gun, believing that he is robbing him. Camila assures Helena that she will not have the operation until after the fashion show, but Helena does not accept her decision. Nora fights with the main model of the fashion show and does not allow her to see her as her maid. Valentina arrives with Claudio at the hospital and they meet Fatima's mother. Helena gives Valentina an opportunity as a seamstress. Guillermo arrives at his house and while he tells Adelaida what happened with Enrique, he begins to feel bad until he faints. Claudio confirms that Analisse is Fátima's mother.
36	"Chapter 36"	14 June 2021	10 June 2021	1.31
Valentina agrees that Analisse take care of Fátima. Camila confesses to Valentina that she loves Ricardo. Beba is willing to beat Patricia, but Patricia assures her that she is very wrong, since her job depends on her. Valentina confirms to Claudio that their wedding plans are still in place. Ricardo is upset with Rosa María when he learns that she ruined his plan against Valentina. Rosa María makes Ricardo see that he no longer has a place in Valentina's heart, since she is in love with Claudio. Ricardo asks Rosa María for help to recover the money he put in Valentina’s name in exchange for a large sum of money. Horacio gives Valentina the letters left by her mother and assures her that in them she will discover the truth, since it is her story. Leonardo begins to confuse his feelings, after a kiss from Valentina. Patricia makes it clear to Helena that she has the battle won with Héctor.
37	"Esparcir veneno"	15 June 2021	11 June 2021	1.26
Valentina begins to read her mother's letters and reaffirms her great love for her. Ricardo accuses his father of millionaire embezzlement and plays the victim in front of Guillermo. Leonardo lets Nora know that Valentina does seem like a model, a situation that bothers her. Patricia asks Enrique to trust her. Rosa María joins Ricardo's plot with the sole purpose of making Claudio fall in love with her. Helena surprises Valentina by giving her an exclusive dress for the dinner she is going to have with Guillermo. Claudio finds out that Ricardo is about to die. Claudio and Valentina arrive on time for their appointment with Guillermo, who when he sees her remembers that it was she who helped him the day he got sick on the street. Patricia convinces Enrique that they both destroy Guillermo for all the damage he has caused them.
38	"El poder de la sangre"	16 June 2021	14 June 2021	1.43
Consuelo makes Héctor doubt Patricia's intentions. Patricia warns Valentina that Guillermo is a dangerous person and urges her to speak in private because her life and that of her sister are in danger. Majo realizes that Héctor never kissed Patricia. Valentina tells her uncle that she does not have the heart to tell Nora that she is not her sister, so Claudio assures her that she can be calm, since they will not say anything. Patricia meets with Valentina and Nora in order to confess the truth to them. Ricardo looks for Claudio to assure him that he did not abandon Valentina, only that he had to be in an accident where he was mistakenly pronounced dead, so he is ready to regain her love. Claudio and Valentina have to postpone the wedding at the orphanage.
39	"Saca tus mejores armas"	17 June 2021	15 June 2021	1.30
When Valentina sees that Patricia is determined to confess the truth, she prefers to go ahead and lie to Nora by assuring her that her father owed a large amount of money. Rosa María receives the proposal to be the director of the hospital. Ricardo is willing to recover Valentina's love and assures her that they were victims of fate, so both must continue fighting for their love. Valentina makes it clear to Ricardo that she loves Claudio and cannot accept his love. Leonardo thinks that Valentina and Nora are hiding something. In order to ruin Helena's fashion show, Leonardo steals her main dress, Valentina, knowing that the dress is missing, begins to make another with the help of Majo, but they refuse to break the news to Helena. Nora informs Valentina that Ricardo is on the brink of death.
40	"Un sello inconfundible"	18 June 2021	16 June 2021	1.33
Nora confuses Valentina by confessing that Ricardo is about to die. Helena is puzzled to learn that the main dress in the collection has disappeared. Ricardo remembers the accident he suffered and has an attack in the middle of the Yolanda Pratas fashion show. Helena suspects that Valentina or Nora are the culprits of stealing the dress. Claudio does not intend to leave Valentina and asks for Consuelo's help. Yolanda Pratas surprises the public and the press with her work on the fashion collection. Helena is happy with Valentina for the result of the new dress for the fashion show. Patricia believes that her brother is hiding something from her about Valentina's whereabouts and is willing to find out. Valentina reveals to Helena that Consuelo suffered a bad move from Yolanda. Nora is concerned about Ricardo's state of health and he reaffirms that he will do everything to win her back. Claudio accepts that he knew Ricardo's state of health and confronts Valentina. Ricardo takes Valentina by force, but they are discovered by Claudio.
41	"Jugar el todo por el todo"	21 June 2021	17 June 2021	1.40
Leonardo puts some substances in the food of Helena's models in order to ruin the show. Valentina is willing to help Ricardo, but she gives him a strong warning. Claudio distrusts Valentina's word. Camila visits Claudio and begs him to allow Ricardo to fulfill his desire to marry Valentina, now that his days are numbered. Patricia manages to convince Enrique to steal the money from Guillermo's foundation. Patricia arrives at Helena's fashion show and tries to humiliate her, but Helena slaps her. Yolanda discovers that Valentina is Helena's new apprentice. Leonardo makes Nora fulfill her dream of being the main model in a fashion show.
42	"Al filo de la navaja"	22 June 2021	21 June 2021	1.49
When Patricia sees Héctor in Helena's fashion show, she asks him to accompany her to the hospital since she feels very bad. Helena is upset to see Nora's work at the show. Helena asks Leonardo for an explanation of Nora's work and he, upon seeing the treatment he receives from Helena, decides to resign. Yolanda discovers that Valentina and Nora are sisters so she asks Beba to investigate their past and thus be able to put together a plan against Helena in order to discredit her. Now that they know that Ricardo has little time to live, Nora and Camila ask Valentina to marry him to make him happy in his last days. Héctor, seeing that Helena does not accept any explanation, decides to show her his love with a kiss. Guillermo meets Nora and Valentina.
43	"Una de ustedes es mi hija"	23 June 2021	22 June 2021	1.41
Consuelo, seeing that Héctor has been in trouble since he met Patricia, asks him to stay away from her and assures him that thanks to that woman he cannot be happy with Helena. Claudio lets Valentina know that what she did in the past with Ricardo does not matter to him. Helena assures Valentina that Guillermo Vargas is a very intelligent person since he never does anything without having an interest. Ricardo lets Patricia know that if Valentina is Guillermo's daughter, she will become the universal heir and will also have the money that was stolen from them, so it is convenient for him to continue fighting for her love to recover what is theirs. Guillermo invites Valentina and Nora to dinner at a luxurious restaurant where he reveals that one of them may be his daughter, and he also tells them how he met their mother.
44	"El destino lo convirtió en realidad"	24 June 2021	23 June 2021	1.34
Rosa María informs Adelaida that Ricardo's health is deteriorating, thus putting his life at risk. Horacio shows Claudio his great treasure and advises him to fight for Valentina's love. Héctor looks for Helena to settle their differences and apologizes for the times he has offended her without thinking and makes it clear that he loves her despite not being up to her standards. Horacio begs Claudio not to tell anyone about his secret. Valentina refuses to take the DNA test, but Nora is in favor of doing it. Rosa María informs Ricardo that his health has deteriorated and he has little time to live. When Nora knew that she could possibly be Guillermo Vargas's heir, she dreams of the life she has always wanted. Helena finds out that Valentina or Nora could be her sister.
45	"No hay que tener secretos"	25 June 2021	25 June 2021	1.36
Helena, knowing her father's secret, assures Valentina that she wants her to become her sister. Mina manages to convince Héctor to enroll in school to complete his studies. Enrique fears that Guillermo will discover that donations for the shelter have been stolen. Helena opens her heart to Valentina and shares that the reason why her relationship with her father was fractured was because she was to blame for her mother's death, but she details that the day they suffered the car accident, she found her mom kissing her boyfriend. Adelaida tells Patricia that Guillermo plans to do the DNA test on Valentina and Nora. Adelaida gets upset with Patricia when she sees her arrogant attitude. Nora informs Leonardo that she or Valentina may be the daughter of Guillermo Vargas.
46	"Amo a mi familia"	28 June 2021	28 June 2021	1.51
Adelaida informs Nora that both her and Valentina are going to take the DNA test, so they must be prepared, but she assures her that her sister is still reluctant to the idea. Leonardo tries to manipulate Nora now that he has in mind the idea that she may be Guillermo's daughter. Nora, convinced that she must be Guillermo's daughter, decides to alter the DNA test with some of Helena's hair, so she hands it over to the doctor in charge, while Valentina refuses to undergo the test. Helena and Héctor have a romantic moment. Yolanda knowing that Helena is gaining ground in the world of fashion, decides to compete to show her that she is the best. Nora tries to mess with Helena by assuring her that she saw Patricia meeting with Hector. Valentina feels confused with everything that is happening with Ricardo.
47	"Yo soy Nora Vargas"	29 June 2021	29 June 2021	1.33
Guillermo finally has the result of the DNA test and discovers that Nora is his daughter, so she immediately begins to feel like part of the family. Helena confesses to Majo that she hopes that Valentina is her sister. Nora, knowing that she is already a true Vargas, decides to move to her new home as soon as possible, but Valentina makes a request. After Majo's confession, Helena advises her to give herself her place as a woman. Patricia proposes to Ricardo to marry Nora for joint assets and thus the inheritance would also be his, but Ricardo rejects her idea. Nora informs her uncle Horacio and the whole family that she is the daughter of Guillermo Vargas.
48	"Seguir su camino"	30 June 2021	30 June 2021	1.43
When Nora finds out that she is the daughter of Guillermo Vargas, all she wants is to go live in her new home and start her life as a millionaire, but Valentina asks her to stay by her side, since they have always been together. Helena finds out that Nora is her sister. When Patricia sees that Nora is already installed in her house, she assures her that she will make her live a living hell. Yolanda finds out that she is going to participate as a jury in the fashion week in Madrid, news that fills her with emotion since in this way she will make Helena suffer. Ricardo has a crisis. Yolanda communicates with Nora in order to make her a proposal. Rosa María informs Patricia and Valentina that Ricardo may not endure another crisis.
49	"Tomar una decisión"	1 July 2021	1 July 2021	1.38
While waiting to receive the imported lace, Leonardo informs Helena that someone picked up the product even though it had the guide number. Patricia causes her vehicle to break down to ask Héctor for help. Claudio is sincere with Valentina and asks her to decide between him or Ricardo, since he is getting tired of the situation. Leonardo hands Yolanda the lace and she thanks him with a kiss. Nora agrees to be part of Olympo Pratas and does not hesitate to let her sisters Valentina and Helena know. Nora does not allow herself to be trampled by Patricia and puts her in her place.
50	"El destino nos vuelve a encontrar"	2 July 2021	2 July 2021	1.40
Nora reproaches Valentina for never believing in her, much less supporting her with the idea of being a model. Nora is upset when she finds out that Valentina is going to fashion week in Madrid, so she assures her that she is going to ask her father to buy her a plane ticket to be present at that important event. Adelaida assures Nora that Yolanda Pratas should not be trusted. Consuelo assures Yolanda Pratas that in the past she was afraid of her, but now she is willing to face her. Tired of the humiliations, Consuelo tries to hit Yolanda, but she assures her that if someone in her family wants to hurt her, she will never see the light of day again. Valentina begs Claudio not to leave her, since she always needs him. Valentina assures Helena that during the meeting that Guillermo organized to introduce Nora, she met Yolanda, but what caught her attention was that the dress she used had lace very similar to the ones stolen from them. Guillermo puts the cards on the table to Nora and asks for discipline.
51	"Cartas que jugar"	5 July 2021	7 July 2021	1.63
Yolanda announces to Helena that she will be a qualifying jury in fashion week, a situation that worries Helena. Nora arrives at her father's office and hears the call he has with Dr. Rosa María and discovers that he has a heart condition, but when she questions him, he rejects her. Yolanda seeing that her plan with the Spanish press to intrigue about Helena did not work for her, she asks Beba to be her accomplice so that on the day of the catwalk she steals the jewel that Camila will use from the Spanish designer. Nora is about to discover Ricardo's secret.
52	"Asumir las consecuencias"	6 July 2021	8 July 2021	1.63
Leonardo continues to humiliate Héctor, so he decides to stop him and the brothers get into a fight. Yolanda gives the victory to the designer Cayetana De Alba in the fashion week event in Madrid, leaving Helena in second place. Beba takes advantage of the fact that the models and all the organizers are distracted to steal the bracelet that Camila used from the famous Spanish designer. Claudio arrives at Ricardo's house to talk about Valentina, but Ricardo assures Claudio that he is not going to leave his way free since Valentina belongs to him. The police do not find the bracelet and they arrest Helena and Camila. Adelaida advises Nora to study a degree and tells her that the entire Vargas family has a university degree. Guillermo asks Rosa María out.
53	"Voy a estar contigo cada día de tu vida"	7 July 2021	9 July 2021	1.46
Patricia tries to make Nora feel less, but Nora leaves her quiet by assuring her that the only thing she is interested in is getting involved with other women's men, since she saw her when she kissed Héctor and the visits that Enrique made to her. Horacio manages to stop Brochas. Yolanda, upon learning that Helena and Camila were released, gets upset with Beba and assures her that it is all her fault for not following her instructions well and now she must plan another trick for Helena. Guillermo rejects the idea of Nora working with Yolanda and asks her to pursue a university degree so that she can become a great businesswoman. Héctor arrives at Helena's apartment in order to console her for all the bad things she experienced in Madrid, Helena does not hesitate to give herself to her great love. Yolanda leaks to the Spanish press that Helena stole the bracelet that the famous designer had lent her.
54	"Un daño irreparable"	8 July 2021	12 July 2021	1.57
The Spanish press has revealed that Helena tried to steal a diamond during fashion week in Madrid. Patricia congratulates Yolanda for her successful plan against her enemy. Guillermo arrives for Rosa María at the hospital and surprises her with a bouquet of flowers. Leonardo informs Yolanda that the brands are calling to cancel contracts with Helena. Valentina asks Nora not to work with Yolanda since she planned for her and Helena to be accused of theft. Leonardo upon learning that his mother is willing to confront Yolanda Pratas begins to humiliate her, but Consuelo slaps him. Nora causes Humberto to be scolded by Guillermo.
55	"Declarar la guerra"	9 July 2021	13 July 2021	1.50
Patricia questions Ricardo about the alleged money he is asking the airline, but realizes that his sister has information that only he knew, so Nora informs them that Lichita is Patricia's spy since she listens to everyone's conversations. Leonardo lets Yolanda know that his mother is willing to confront her. Majo faints. Yolanda looks for Valentina and assures her that she is not to blame for the video leaking to the press where it is seen that she is taking her jewelry, but Valentina does not believe her and calls her a liar. Guillermo surprises Rosa María again and she believes that she does not deserve anything that she is experiencing, since at first she wanted to separate Valentina and Claudio and then lied about Ricardo's illness. Majo discovers that she is pregnant and assures Helena that Leonardo is not the father of her child. Yolanda is already preparing another strong blow for Helena, after Valentina declared war on her. After learning that Majo is pregnant, Leonardo asks her to interrupt her pregnancy since he does not plan to take care of the baby, but she refuses. Valentina confesses to Helena that the loss of the two contracts was her fault.
56	"Nuestra realidad"	12 July 2021	14 July 2021	1.28
Leonardo confesses to Helena that he accompanied Majo to undergo artificial insemination and reiterates that he did sleep with Majo, but they took care of each other. Guillermo organizes a dinner at his house as a thank you for the attention that Dr. Rosa María has had with him. After a heated argument with Héctor, Guillermo suffers a heart attack and is rushed to the hospital. Leonardo apologizes to his mother for disrespecting her. Seeing that her father was about to lose his life, Helena tries to reconcile with him, but Guillermo reacts in a negative way. Horacio finds Valentina in bed with Claudio. Helena complains to Héctor for having told her that he was working when in fact he was at his father's house with Patricia.
57	"¡Vamos a casarnos!"	13 July 2021	15 July 2021	1.54
Nora agrees to work for Yolanda and assures that one day all the people who did not trust her will regret it. Leonardo informs Yolanda that perhaps Nora is not Guillermo's daughter. Claudio and Valentina advance their wedding. Leonardo tries to hurt Majo now that he knows that she is expecting a baby of his. Valentina informs Nora that she already has a date for her wedding with Claudio. Ricardo finds out about Valentina's plans. Héctor makes a proposal to Helena. Yolanda, upon learning that the journalist retracted, is determined to use Nora to attack Valentina. Ricardo arrives and prevents Valentina's wedding, Claudio tries to run him off, but Ricardo refuses and they get into a fist fight.
58	"Los cuentos de hadas no existen"	14 July 2021	16 July 2021	1.36
Ricardo is left unconscious after receiving a strong blow from Claudio, Rosa María assures Valentina and Patricia that Ricardo may never wake up. Valentina and Claudio fight over Ricardo's situation. After what happened with Ricardo, Patricia threatens Valentina in the hospital. Ricardo assures Valentina that they are together again, but she swears that it was all because he interrupted their wedding. Valentina asks Claudio to talk about what happened, but he assures her that the best thing is to end their relationship. Nora sleeps with Leonardo in order for him not to investigate if she is actually Guillermo's daughter.
59	"Lo perdí para siempre"	15 July 2021	19 July 2021	1.51
Rosa María confesses to being in love with Claudio so she does not plan to miss the opportunity. Majo tries to cheer up Valentina. Adelaida reveals to Ricardo a secret about her biological father. Valentina, seeing that her relationship with Claudio ended, decides to leave the house, but her uncle Horacio takes the opportunity to claim what he did to his son. Yolanda has another plan in mind to attack Helena Vargas, but now it will be at the hands of Francesco. Valentina, seeing that her relationship with Claudio ended, decides to leave the house, but her uncle Horacio takes the opportunity to claim what he did to his son. Yolanda has another plan in mind to attack Helena Vargas, but now it will be at the hands of Francesco.
60	"Hacer sacrificios"	16 July 2021	20 July 2021	1.83
Helena could have a new business partner, but Leonardo listens to this deal. Ricardo does not want to continue in his psychological treatment and this implies never recovering. The estrangement between Valentina and Claudio is more evident in front of the workers of the fashion house. Brochas and Perro are surprised by Consuelo trying to rob Horacio's house. The hacienda staff looks for Valentina with the support of the orphanage staff. Camila begins to fall in love with Ricardo and their meeting is about to take place with a kiss. Claudio quits his job to avoid contact with Valentina. Helena offers her support to Valentina and becomes her lead designer. Valentina tries to fix things with Claudio and he assures that he will not wait for her forever. Consuelo is distraught because Horacio and his family are in danger, but this could bring them closer together.
61	"Una mala acción siempre trae un karma"	19 July 2021	21 July 2021	1.37
Nora, knowing that Claudio no longer plans to look for Valentina and that their relationship ended forever, is willing to fight for Claudio's love. Héctor makes Helena have a very pleasant time. Patricia asks Leonardo to help her investigate whether Nora is not Guillermo's daughter. Beba achieves her mission and makes the video of Camila's statements against Yolanda viral. Valentina finds out that Claudio had a date with Rosamaría, which provokes her jealousy. Valentina seeing that she is locked up with Claudio, she asks him not to leave and does not hesitate to kiss him.
62	"Sacrificar corderos"	20 July 2021	23 July 2021	1.40
Leonardo upon learning of Beba's plan does not hesitate to confront her for damaging the image of his sister Camila again. Enrique suggests that Guillermo perform a second DNA test on Nora due to the question of the name change procedures, but at this request, Nora fears being discovered. Claudio, realizing that his father's house is being robbed by Brochas, decides to confront him, but is run over, Valentina has a bad feeling. Horacio believes that the robbery of his house was due to the curse of the treasure. Minutes before starting the press conference, Yolanda surprises Helena with her visit to the workshop. Ricardo, upon learning that Valentina is being investigated for tax evasion, informs the agents where they can find her.
63	"Hay amores que no se deben dejar ir"	21 July 2021	26 July 2021	1.40
Claudio knows that Valentina is the woman of his life, so he is determined to get her back so he surprises her in his apartment and she does not hesitate to give herself to him. Ricardo uses Camila to get his hands on Valentina. Leonardo takes advantage of the fact that Valentina combed her hair on the dressing table and obtains the hair for the DNA test that Patricia wants to carry out and thus find out who Guillermo's daughter is. Yolanda reveals the reasons why she hates Helena Vargas. Patricia, with the help of Enrique, pretends to be kidnapped only to catch Hector's attention and thus be able to conquer him. Adelaida is determined to get her son back. Valentina is in danger because of Fatima's father.
64	"Ahora yo soy la dueña"	22 July 2021	27 July 2021	1.46
Nora questions Valentina about what she would do if she were Guillermo Vargas's daughter. Helena finds Héctor kissing Patricia. Camila feels desperate because of all the pressure from the media. Consuelo arrives in Olimpo Pratas and does not hesitate to confront Yolanda for all the torment that her daughter Camila is experiencing. Valentina seeks to have a good gesture with her sister Nora, but she assures her that she spoiled all her dreams. Adelaida, upon discovering that Nora will be the new owner of the Manrique ranch, assures her that her resentment towards Patricia will not bring her anything good and what she is really looking for is revenge. Patricia has Valentina's hair analyzed to find out if she is really Guillermo's daughter.
65	"Te espera mucho dolor"	23 July 2021	28 July 2021	1.49
When Valentina arrives at her apartment, she meets Emma who is determined to read tarot cards to her, but when she reaches one of them, she assures Valentina that she could not know what her future holds for her; however, she realizes that moments of great pain await Valentina. Nora lets Patricia know that now she is the owner of the Manrique ranch. After having Valentina's hair analyzed, Patricia discovers that she is actually Guillermo Vargas's daughter. Leonardo will find a way to prevent Majo from having his baby and Ricardo asks Valentina to talk to Nora about getting the ranch back to them. Enrique manages to convince Nora to sign some documents with the idea that she will soon be the owner of the Manrique ranch, but in reality Nora signed the papers in which she authorizes half of Guillermo's fortune to be transferred to a ghost account in the Cayman Islands. Valentina arrives at Patricia's office to come to Nora's defense, but she shows her some documents in which she accredits the millionaire embezzlement that Nora carried out. Camila asks Ricardo for a chance and doesn't hesitate to kiss him.
66	"La maldad tiene muchos rostros"	26 July 2021	30 July 2021	1.20
Yolanda continues with her revenge plan against Helena and now her main ally is Rocío, whom she asks to register the designs in her name, making her become another of her allies to destroy her worst enemy. Patricia assures Valentina that if she refuses to marry Ricardo, she is going to put Nora in jail. Nora takes advantage of the fact that Humberto is in love with her to propose a plan, so he does not hesitate to accept. Horacio is attacked by Regino. Patricia assures Ricardo that Valentina is still madly in love with him. To prevent Nora from being accused of robbery and having to go to jail, Valentina communicates with Patricia and confirms that she is going to marry Ricardo. Helena manages to communicate with Francesco and discovers that he lied to her. Yolanda informs Nora that Sara Eva will be her new titular model and now she will have to compete with her.
67	"Tiro de gracia"	27 July 2021	2 August 2021	1.50
Valentina tries to console Helena for what happened with her workshop, but she feels at her worst, so she asks her to call a meeting. Patricia makes Leonardo believe that Nora is Guillermo's daughter. Mina leaves the house. Helena informs her work team that they are bankrupt, making it the end of the haute couture workshop. Beba and Sara Eva humiliate Nora, she declares war on them. Valentina confirms to Ricardo that she is going to marry him. Leonardo causes an accident to Majo which causes her to lose her baby. Valentina informs Claudio that she is going to marry Ricardo, Claudio, knowing the decision that Valentina made, asks her to leave his life and not speak to him again.
68	"El corazón no entiende razones"	28 July 2021	3 August 2021	1.50
Adelaida remembers when Yolanda revealed to Armando that she was pregnant, a situation that led to her having to separate from her son. Rosa María finds out that Claudio broke off his engagement with Valentina. Helena is in charge of informing Majo that she lost her baby. Mina confesses to Consuelo and her father that she is not willing to share her with anyone. Claudio cries because of Valentina's decisions. Ricardo promises Valentina eternal love and assures her that he still cannot believe that they are getting married. Guillermo shares with Nora that Valentina is a very admirable woman. Helena announces to all her workers that "Casa Helena Vargas" will close its doors. Héctor arrives at Helena's workshop and sees his brother Leonardo hugging her, so he doesn't hesitate to beat him up. Helena informs Valentina that from today she will start occupying Claudio's office. Patricia assures Nora that her sister is going to marry Ricardo and believes that her love for Valentina is because she is up to something and is willing to find out.
69	"Plato de segunda mesa"	29 July 2021	4 August 2021	1.43
Ricardo communicates with Camila to inform her that he is going to marry Valentina, but he does not hesitate to tell her that he has feelings for her. Patricia seeks to know how Enrique will manage to appropriate the ranch that belonged to her father and that is valued in millions of pesos. Nora assures Valentina that Claudio will forget her very quickly, a comment that saddens her. Horacio shares with Consuelo that he doesn't want to lose her, so they decide to stay together, but being very discreet. Ricardo visits Valentina at Helena's workshop, but she rejects him. Helena confesses to Majo that she believes that Yolanda was the culprit of her accident in complicity with Rocío, since she checked the cameras and they stopped recording just at the moment that she fell down the stairs, Uriel when listening to Helena's conversation communicates with Leonardo and assures him that they are in trouble. Guillermo falls for Yolanda's seduction and asks her that if she wants them to continue seeing each other, she should avoid talking about the past. Valentina sees Claudio with Rosa María.
70	"No dejes de luchar"	30 July 2021	5 August 2021	1.40
Valentina and Nora arrive at the same restaurant where Claudio and Rosa María are, so they sit at the same table, causing an uncomfortable moment. Patricia finds out that Ricardo is interested in Camila. Nora takes advantage of the fact that she is left alone with Rosa María and questions her about her intentions for Claudio. Rosa María does not hesitate to make a strong comment to Nora, but Nora does not remain silent. Valentina assures Claudio that she loves him, but he no longer believes her. Yolanda assures Valentina that Nora is working with her just because she is Guillermo's daughter, otherwise she would consider her like any worker. Guillermo discovers that Nora works with Yolanda as a model, a situation that causes him anger, but Valentina comes to her sister's defense and convinces Guillermo to let her realize her dream. Patricia arrives at Helena's apartment and assures her that everything that happened was a mistake, so she seeks to reconcile and befriends Helena.
71	"Una mujer comprometida"	2 August 2021	6 August 2021	1.36
Claudio offers to take Valentina home and when they say goodbye they almost kiss, but he assures her that the best thing is to get away. Majo receives a call where she is assured that the accident she suffered was provoked. Helena is afraid of getting fat again now that she is full of problems. Leonardo asks Uriel to accept in front of Helena that it was he who helped Rocío to betray her. Valentina assures Helena that everything reminds her of Claudio so she does not feel comfortable occupying his office. Guillermo blames Humberto for breach of trust. Helena, when she sees Rocío in her workshop, confronts her and refuses to do some kind of business with the woman who betrayed her. Valentina assures Rocío that she stole her work. Nora arrives to look for Claudio with other intentions. Camila agrees to be with Ricardo despite his commitment to Valentina. Consuelo warns Camila that she is not going to allow her to get in the way of Ricardo and Valentina.
72	"Una hermana modelo"	3 August 2021	9 August 2021	1.38
Nora arrives at Claudio's house in order to convince him to give her private lessons now that she is going back to school and seeing that they are alone, she does not hesitate to flirt with him. Helena says goodbye to her workers. Guillermo, upon seeing the millionaire embezzlement in his bank accounts, dismisses Humberto and asks his security to remove him from the company. Yolanda seeks to win back Guillermo so she sees in Nora a great ally. Valentina rejects Ricardo's requests. Claudio shares with Rosa María that his relationship with Valentina is hopeless, a situation that she takes advantage of to try to kiss him, but they are interrupted by Guillermo. Patricia asks Valentina to go live at Guillermo's house, otherwise she threatens to put Nora in jail. Leonardo continues to humiliate his mother for the way she lives, but Majo listens to him and comes to Consuelo's defense.
73	"El amor se fortalece en la tormenta"	4 August 2021	10 August 2021	1.29
Majo demands that Leonardo apologize to his mother for his way of being. Nora throws a glass of water at Beba and assures her that very soon Olympo Pratas will be hers, so she asks her to become her ally. Adelaida finds her son David. Valentina dreams that Nora is imprisoned. Valentina confesses to Claudio that before getting married she is going to live with Ricardo, so he assures her that he cannot accept her decision, Valentina promises to be faithful to him since she will not allow Ricardo to touch her. Guillermo tells Nora that Yolanda is anything but charming. Helena is notified that her shop and apartment will be repossessed. Rosa María assures Guillermo that nothing can exist between the two of them, while Yolanda is in his life. Patricia will find Ricardo with Camila and annoyingly assures her that her brother is only for Valentina. Nora refuses to let Valentina live in her house.
74	"Voy a estar en la calle"	5 August 2021	11 August 2021	1.40
Patricia gives the order that Valentina not enjoy any privilege in Guillermo's house, otherwise she will find herself in dire need to fire Lucha and Mechita. Yolanda is willing to acquire Helena's debt to keep her assets. Ricardo learns that the treasury has frozen all the money in Valentina's account, so it will be impossible to recover it. Guillermo asks Rosa María to give him the opportunity to see each other as friends. Horacio assures Consuelo that it is very well known that Leonardo is her spoiled son. Yolanda arrives at Helena's workshop to inform her that she is now the new owner of the property. Guillermo welcomes Valentina and assures her that he is going to protect her as if she were her daughter. Nora records a video of Ricardo's reception of her sister and sends it to Claudio. Héctor promises Helena that he will do everything in his power to make her happy.
75	"Esto es una cárcel"	6 August 2021	12 August 2021	1.43
Yolanda looks for Guillermo to have another chance encounter, but he assures her that it is best not to see each other anymore, so Yolanda suspects that it is all because he is in love with Rosa María. Nora becomes jealous of Valentina's arrival at her house. Valentina takes advantage of the fact that she is alone with Ricardo and assures him that she stopped loving him the day he preferred to go with his father and leave her alone and now that she met Claudio she discovered true love. Patricia assures Nora that she has the perfect plan for her to conquer Claudio. Nora begins her plan against Valentina and takes advantage of the fact that her sister's cell phone is on the table to move it around, but accidentally drops it on the soup. Ricardo tries to forcibly kiss Valentina and she defends herself by slapping him, Patricia assures Valentina that she is forbidden to leave the house until she shows that she is in love with her brother Ricardo.
76	"Echarse la soga al cuello"	9 August 2021	13 August 2021	1.42
Yolanda arrives at Rosa María's office and demands that she stay away from Guillermo, otherwise she will see the consequences. Patricia will make a confession to Valentina and Nora will not hesitate to kiss Ricardo. Valentina informs Guillermo that Patricia forbade her to leave the house, so he comes to her defense and warns Lucha that he is the one in charge of the house. Leonardo advises Helena to ask Patricia for help, but she refuses. Guillermo learns that Helena lost her workshop. Nora, seeing that the ranch will not be hers until she finishes a career, asks Enrique to give her the documents she signed, but Patricia assures her that this is not possible. Guillermo visits Yolanda and asks her not to mess with Rosa María. Valentina accepts Ricardo to take her to Helena's workshop and questions him about his relationship with his father, so he bursts into tears and she does not hesitate to console him, but Claudio finds them.
77	"El amor es algo complicado"	10 August 2021	16 August 2021	1.61
Ricardo begs Patricia to help him in a plan against Valentina, so she does not hesitate to accept the proposal. Leonardo asks Regino to assault Héctor. Claudio believes that Valentina has already forgiven Ricardo. Beba deletes the videos where it is clear that it was Consuelo who stole Yolanda's designs and assures her that the security team did not capture the person who entered her office. Yolanda is ready to stop Nora from modeling if she refuses to help her with Guillermo. Héctor arrives at his mother's house and discovers her making out with Horacio. Nora swears to Yolanda that she has spoken highly of her to her dad, so she asks her to try harder, otherwise she will say goodbye to her modeling career. Patricia discovers that Ricardo is dating Camila, but she stops him and demands that he stop looking for her. Helena is worried about Majo's health. Héctor and Horacio are in danger.
78	"Majo está al borde de la muerte"	11 August 2021	17 August 2021	1.63
Majo is taken to the hospital where she undergoes emergency surgery. Camila arrives at Ricardo's house and Mina defends her aunt from Patricia's attacks. Claudio asks Valentina for an explanation about the kiss she gave Ricardo. Consuelo confesses to Horacio that she broke into Yolanda's office to look for Camila's video. Valentina steals a kiss from Claudio and he doesn't hesitate to kiss her back. Helena learns that her dresses were stolen. Rosa María informs Helena that Majo's health condition is critical. Ricardo invites Camila to his room and they get caught up in the moment. Valentina learns that Nora was the one who told Claudio that she and Ricardo spent the night together. Claudio takes advantage of Nora's arrival at the hospital to confront her. Yolanda does not want Nora in Olimpo Pratas until she sees that Guillermo is looking for her again.
79	"Yo no te dejaba ir por nadie"	12 August 2021	19 August 2021	1.69
Camila gives herself to Ricardo and confesses how much she loves him, but when he hears her confession, he prefers to keep silent. Claudio is determined to find the reasons why Ricardo wants to marry Valentina, so he interrogates Rosa María. Nora assures Claudio that he misunderstood her message. Tired of the humiliations, Beba records a conversation with Yolanda where she confesses the robbery she did to Helena. Camila opens her heart to her mother and reveals that she gave herself to Ricardo. Leonardo takes advantage of the fact that he is alone with Majo to reveal that he caused the accident so she would lose the baby. Nora proposes to Claudio that he be her full-time teacher in exchange she will investigate the reasons why Valentina decided to marry Ricardo, so she does not hesitate to seduce him and Valentina discovers her. Ricardo finds the man he believes to be his father. Uriel confesses to Valentina that someone forced him to deactivate the cameras just at the time of Majo's accident.
80	"Una luz de esperanza"	13 August 2021	20 August 2021	1.36
Uriel is about to reveal the whole truth about what happened with Helena's fashion house, but Leonardo interrupts the moment. Camila is sad about her situation of not being reciprocated by Ricardo. Rosa María informs Helena that Majo went into a coma. Rosa Maria explains to Helena that Majo has a small hope of life only if she makes it through the night. Claudio questions Horacio to learn more about his biological father. Adelaida has a plan to destroy Yolanda, but needs Consuelo's support. Valentina takes care of Helena, but discovers that there is something wrong with the way she feeds herself. Nora provokes an uncomfortable meeting between Valentina, Claudio and Ricardo.
81	"No te dejes vencer"	16 August 2021	23 August 2021	1.62
Yolanda has in her possession the order to evict Helena Vargas from her workshop and apartment. Valentina questions Leonardo if he believes that Majo's accident was provoked. Helena receives good news about Majo's health. Leonardo makes Valentina believe that Claudio or Majo could be the people betraying Helena's trust. Patricia confirms to Enrique that Valentina is Guillermo's daughter. Nora is upset with her aunt Adelaida and her father when she learns that they want to invite Valentina to be part of the foundation. Ricardo surprises Valentina by giving her her mother's sewing machine and all her sewing equipment. Valentina makes a proposal to Nora. Yolanda arrives to evict Helena from her workshop and apartment.
82	"Todos merecemos una segunda oportunidad"	17 August 2021	24 August 2021	1.50
Valentina, seeing that Nora arrived with Yolanda, does not hesitate to confront her and assures her that money has turned her into a stupid girl. Patricia tries to win Helena over. Adelaida gets upset with Guillermo when she sees that he does not intend to help his daughter Helena. Yolanda proposes Leonardo to work for her since she wants to keep Helena's best employees. Adelaida gives all her support to her niece. Valentina sees Guillermo and does not hesitate to tell him that everyone should have a second chance. Nora assures Valentina that now that she is going to marry Ricardo, she is willing to take Claudio's love away from her and things get complicated for Valentina's wedding to Ricardo.
83	"La boda del año"	18 August 2021	25 August 2021	1.39
When Helena learns that her friend Majo is debating between life and death, she feels very sad because she misses her so much that she takes refuge in food. Yolanda takes Nora out of the competition because of Guillermo's rejection. Yolanda starts remodeling Helena's former workshop and shows Leonardo her new office and discovers that Uriel will be the new Art Director. Claudio agrees to work with Guillermo, but under certain conditions and Camila finds Ricardo with Valentina. Beba inadvertently bumps into Uriel and he assures her that he is there to serve her and to consider him as her friend and ally. Nora informs Claudio that Valentina and Ricardo's wedding is only one day away. Nora takes revenge and provokes Valentina to explode against Patricia, believing that she tore her dresses. Ricardo, seeing the situation, tries to reassure his future wife, but she assures him that she will marry him because she has no other choice.
84	"La boda de Valentina y Ricardo"	19 August 2021	26 August 2021	1.49
Nora makes her sister believe that it hurts her to see her sad, but Valentina assures her that she does not recognize her because she is never there when she needs her. Leonardo, when he learns that Helena will not be at the dinner that his mother has organized, decides to leave the house. Claudio confesses to Helena that he will start working with Guillermo, which makes her feel betrayed. Yolanda meets Guillermo at her new workshop and assures him that she is willing to take back what is hers. Leonardo, upon learning of the relationship between Consuelo and Horacio, does not hesitate to humiliate his mother. Valentina looks for Claudio and assures him that she will not be able to keep her promise, so she leaves him free. Despite not being in love with Ricardo, Valentina marries Patricia's brother. Rosa María confesses to Claudio the reasons why Ricardo wants to marry Valentina.
85	"Como alma en pena"	20 August 2021	27 August 2021	1.34
Patricia celebrates that her plan turned out as she thought it would, but now she must prevent being discovered that Valentina and Ricardo's wedding was a fake. Valentina warns Nora not to dare to take away Claudio's love. Horacio tries to encourage Helena. Claudio assures Rosa María not to comment on Ricardo's plans, since Valentina's freedom is in danger. Regino will not rest until Hector is dead. Leonardo makes a pass at Beba. Ricardo surprises Valentina in her room and thanks her for giving him the privilege of becoming her husband and reiterates that he will respect her and asks her to be friends. Lucha tells Valentina that Arcadio saw Nora enter her room with a pair of scissors. Ricardo finds out that the money he has in the bank is being watched by the police. Valentina meets Nicolás, Ricardo's father.
86	"Te necesito más que nunca"	23 August 2021	30 August 2021	1.61
Héctor returns to Patricia the gifts she gave Mina and makes it clear that he is disappointed in her since he did not expect to find her enjoying Helena's apartment. Yolanda learns that Sara Eva was mugged and during the robbery, her leg was broken. Ricardo arrives home and is reunited with Nicolás, his father, so when he sees him he gives him a big hug. Nora discovers that it was Leonardo who planned the robbery of Sara Eva and he assures her that she should be grateful for the favor he did her. Enrique continues his revenge against Guillermo. Rosa Maria gives Guillermo a chance and confirms it with a kiss. Nicolás confesses to Ricardo the reasons why he separated from his mother. Yolanda believes that Nora is related to the robbery of Sara Eva, but assures her that her plan didn't work because a top model is about to arrive to take the main place. Patricia finds Valentina and Ricardo in bed and does not hesitate to photograph them.
87	"Cada quien forja su propio destino"	24 August 2021	31 August 2021	1.63
Beba proposes to Nora to appear at the press conference as Yolanda Pratas' new model. After learning how his mother died, Ricardo confronts Patricia and does not hesitate to make an attempt on his sister's life. Nora assures Yolanda that she is doing Olympo Pratas a favor, so she asks her to focus on her work and she will take care of the rest. Patricia tells Leonardo that his proposal is not working out with Héctor and shares that his proud brother returned Mina's gifts. Leonardo reveals to Patricia the reasons why he hates his brother Héctor. Valentina confesses to Claudio that she suspects Leonardo had to do with what happened with Helena. Camila and Ricardo get back together. Leonardo assures Yolanda that he has nothing to do with what happened to Sara Eva and Yolanda threatens to take revenge on the person in charge of ruining her plans. Mina learns about the condition of her friend Carlitos.
88	"Escucha a tu corazón"	25 August 2021	1 September 2021	1.54
Valentina confesses to Claudio that she cannot be happy because he is not by her side and reiterates that he is the only man she wants to be with. Leonardo assures Patricia that she must be very skilled to be able to make Héctor fall in love. Beba confesses to Uriel that all the bad things she has done are in order to get Yolanda Pratas' acceptance, but the only thing she has gained are humiliations, so she gives Uriel the paparazzi's information and assures him that if Camila's video comes to light, it will be the beginning of the end for Yolanda. Valentina lets Claudio know that she doesn't want to cause him any more misfortune. Valentina swears her unconditional love to Claudio and does not hesitate to give herself to him again. Adelaida’s son arrives at Guillermo's house. Nora realizes that Valentina spent the night with Claudio. Patricia surprises Héctor by assuring him that Helena's apartment will be inherited by Mina, since she was never able to have children.
89	"Momento de crisis"	26 August 2021	2 September 2021	1.41
Adelaida proposes to Consuelo to take revenge on Yolanda and shares her plan to get rid of the woman who hurt them so much. Patricia wins Héctor's trust again, after assuring him that Helena's apartment will be put in Mina's name. Nora will not allow Valentina to be with Claudio again. Guillermo learns that his company lost a large amount of money, after he supposedly sent an e-mail where he canceled the orders, a situation that he denies, but Lizia assures him that he has made changes several times and then does not remember them. Adelaida discovers that her son was in the house. Nora seeks revenge on Valentina, so she takes her phone and pretends to be Valentina to send a message to Claudio in which she assures him that she no longer wants to have anything to do with him because she regrets having cheated on Ricardo. Consuelo confesses to her daughter that out of revenge she took away the man Yolanda Pratas loved so much, a situation that angers Camila and assures her that she feels disappointed in her. Adelaida is reunited with her son David.
90	"Valentina encuentra a Claudio en la cama con Nora"	27 August 2021	3 September 2021	1.46
Claudio proposes to Guillermo to sell the ranch in order to get out of the crisis of his company, Nora refuses to stay without her inheritance and invites Claudio to dinner, where she takes the opportunity to drug him. Majo begins to remember that Leonardo caused the accident and that upsets her. Patricia confesses to Ricardo the reasons why Valentina agreed to marry him and leaves open the possibility that Nora may not be Guillermo's real daughter. Rosa María is convinced that at some point, Majo could come out of the coma. Leonardo discovers that Beba is spying on him and decides to confront her, but she confronts him by assuring him that she is nothing like she seems, so he threatens her. Nora succeeds in taking Claudio to bed, so Valentina enters her sister's room and finds them together. Leonardo learns about his mother's past.
91	"No te quiero volver a ver en mi vida"	30 August 2021	6 September 2021	1.35
Valentina finds Claudio with Nora and confronts them and with a broken heart, she swears that she wants nothing to do with them. Guillermo tells Claudio to leave and asks Nora to respect the house. Yolanda assures Patricia that with her new plan, she will be able to get closer to Héctor. Valentina does not assimilate that her sister has betrayed her after she practically gave her life to raise Nora. Helena and Horacio are upset with Claudio for what he did to Valentina and Consuelo puts her plan into action. Adelaida reveals to Guillermo that she had a son with Armando Manrique, for which she is willing to defend him, he cannot believe that his sister abandoned her own son and gets upset. Ricardo assures Valentina that he already found out what Nora and Claudio did to her, so he is willing to help her. Helena proposes to Valentina to start a new business so they can both get ahead.
92	"Tú y yo ya somos pareja"	31 August 2021	7 September 2021	1.40
Claudio returns to the bar where he went with Nora in the hope that they can help him; however, the owner of the place denies him access, but he manages to filter into the area where they have the security cameras. Yolanda falls into Consuelo's trap and asks Beba to register Josefina's designs in her name. Valentina assures Ricardo that she does not plan to return to Guillermo's house. Ricardo asks Valentina if she has thought that she might be Guillermo's real daughter and not Nora, but she assures him that this cannot be true. Nora visits Claudio at his house and makes it clear that after the night they spent together, means something to her. Yolanda has everything ready to make Consuelo pay for all the damage she caused her by taking Andres' love away from her. Now that Valentina has refused to return to Guillermo's house, Ricardo manages to convince her to stay in a hotel and does not hesitate to surprise her with her favorite dish. Nora learns of the existence of a cousin.
93	"Todo terminó mal"	1 September 2021	8 September 2021	1.47
Patricia stays at Consuelo's house and shares with them that her brother Ricardo is finally having a marriage life with Valentina. Helena cannot believe Patricia's attitude towards Mina and Héctor assures his mother that she will soon discover Leonardo's true face. Guillermo meets Valentina and Ricardo in a restaurant and congratulates them for being together, but she asks him not to misinterpret the moment and assures him that she will not return to live at his house. Nora visits Claudio and asks him for advice on how to help her father without having to sell the ranch. Claudio asks Valentina to accompany him to the restaurant where he was with Nora, and at the restaurant they discover that Nora did put a drug in his drink. Yolanda confesses to Consuelo that Leonardo is her lover and Consuleo does not hesitate to confront Yolando and slap Leonardo. Helena finds Héctor with Luna.
94	"El que juega con fuego termina quemado"	2 September 2021	9 September 2021	1.56
Yolanda mocks Leonardo by assuring him that he is not a good lover and fires him from Olympo Pratas, he vows revenge. Claudio prevents Valentina from confronting Nora. David meets the Vargas family. Being rejected by Guillermo, Yolanda will not stop her revenge against Adelaida and will make her pay with what she loves most. Consuelo confesses to Camila that Leonardo has been an accomplice of Yolanda Pratas. Nora will not allow Adelaida's son to take away her inheritance and assures Claudio that she will convince her father to rehire him. Nora confesses to her father that she is very much in love with Claudio. Héctor reproaches his mother that all his effort has been for nothing, since she will always agree with Leonardo. Guillermo blackmails Claudio with giving him back his job, in exchange for him marrying Nora, she is thrilled to hear the proposal, knowing that she will finally be with the man she loves. Héctor decides to leave his mother's house. Majo reacts.
95	"Juntas podemos tener poder"	3 September 2021	10 September 2021	1.55
Claudio assures Guillermo that he cannot marry a woman he does not love, to which he assures him that he expected him to respond like a gentleman. Guillermo plans to withdraw support for the orphanage. Héctor arrives at Guillermo's house to confront Ricardo and demands that he leave his sister Camila alone. Leonardo swears to his mother that everything Yolanda told her is a lie. Rosa María assures Helena that she is doing everything possible to get Majo back. Nora makes a proposal to Yolanda and assures her that together, they can have a lot of power so she is willing to do anything, also to prevent Guillermo from selling the ranch she has a plan in mind that will put everyone in danger. Claudio reveals to Valentina that Guillermo is blackmailing him to marry Nora, otherwise, he will withdraw all support to the orphanage. Yolanda, Nora and Patricia join forces to put an end to their enemies.
96	"Ya fue suficiente"	6 September 2021	13 September 2021	1.64
Valentina seeks out Nora to ask her not to take away the help for the children at the orphanage, but she refuses and assures her that whatever it takes, she will keep Claudio's love. Guillermo insults Adelaida with her past and she does not hesitate to slap him in the face. Majo reacts and reveals that Leonardo caused her accident. Valentina assures Ricardo that she is willing to find out the reasons why Patricia forced her to get married immediately. Yolanda asks Regino to do to Leonardo what he did to Sara Eva. Ricardo arrives at Patricia's apartment to find out if Valentina is Guillermo's daughter, but when he sees that she has a guest at home, he does not hesitate to make a bad comment to her and she reacts with a slap. Valentina reveals to Claudio the real reasons why she married Ricardo. Nora sets fire to Guillermo's house, with the sole purpose of keeping the ranch.
97	"El dinero de tu papá"	7 September 2021	14 September 2021	1.47
Valentina wants to annul her marriage to Ricardo, so Claudio advises her that to find the truth, they must play Patricia's game. Lizia is ready to take revenge on Enrique when she discovers his deceit. Guillermo, upon learning of Majo's condition, decides to visit her and thanks her for having been an extraordinary friend to Helena and shares with her that he wants to reconcile with his daughter. Héctor swears to Luna that she has a very special place in his life and no one will take it away from her. Leonardo takes advantage of Helena's grief over her friend Majo's situation to try to kiss her, but she puts a stop to it. Camila discovers that she is pregnant. After an argument between sisters, Valentina slaps Nora and Guillermo comes to his Nora’s defense and asks Valentina not to return to live in the house, Claudio tries to defend her, but Ricardo assures Valentina that it is his duty to be by her side.
98	"Un corazón para Carlitos"	8 September 2021	15 September 2021	1.60
After the fire, Guillermo takes Nora and her family to what will be their new home. Guillermo reiterates that the sale of the ranch will help him with the problem he has with the importer, but his daughter rejects the idea and asks him to collect the insurance on the house. Patricia refuses to let Ricardo and Valentina spend the night in her apartment. Leonardo steals Horacio's jewelry, so he is willing to sell them and with the money he gets he knows he will be able to survive to continue with his plan to leave Yolanda in the street. Valentina and Claudio learn that Carlitos needs a heart transplant as soon as possible. Consuelo discovers that Horacio is guarding a great treasure and asks for an explanation to which he assures her that the treasure is cursed. Leonardo takes the jewels to be valued and realizes that they can give him a fortune, but when he leaves the place he is hit on the head. Adelaida learns of her brother Guillermo's terrible suffering and he assures Enrique that he is willing to cede the ranch to Patricia so that she can sell it and the company can recover.
99	"Mi golpe más fuerte"	9 September 2021	16 September 2021	1.48
Nora announces nationwide that Claudio gave her the engagement ring, he gets upset when he hears the news and Valentina wants to confront her sister. Mina gets into a fight with a schoolmate after he makes fun of Carlitos' health. Camila informs Ricardo that she is expecting his child, but upon hearing the news he questions her if he is really the father, a reaction that makes Camila angry and she slaps him. Patricia assures Nora that she should not be so calm that the ranch is for her. Valentina confronts her sister Nora and asks her to leave her alone, since now she has everything she wanted, Yolanda seeing that they are fighting in her workshop decides to kick out Valentina. Claudio asks Héctor to get closer to Patricia so that he can discover the truth. Nora assures Yolanda that she wants to beat Valentina because she is tired of her perfection and always being compared to her.
100	"Donación dominó"	10 September 2021	17 September 2021	1.25
Claudio goes to the bank to find out what is happening with Valentina's accounts and if he can help her. Helena suffers from trying to forget Majo and clings to this feeling. Adelaida is surprised by Helena's letter to Guillermo. Yolanda confronts Beba and they talk about the loyalty that should exist between them, but she puts her to the test. Uriel asks Leonardo to trust him if he wants revenge on Yolanda. Helena faces her feelings and dedicates a farewell message to her friend. Horacio believes that Valentina is Guillermo's real daughter. Claudio wants nothing to do with Nora and reaffirms his love for Valentina. Guillermo wants to clarify his situation with Helena and asks her to talk about the past. Ricardo tries to apologize to Camila, but she rejects him. Valentina goes to visit Majo, but minutes later she is declared brain dead.
101	"Héctor y Patricia se entregan a la pasión"	13 September 2021	20 September 2021	1.55
Helena learns that her father needs a heart transplant and that her donor will be Majo. Ricardo asks Yolanda for help and she does not hesitate to offer her support in exchange for a favor. Yolanda remembers the day she hired a young man to make Helena and Estela fall in love at the same time so that Guillermo would stay away from them and stay with her. Lucha suspects that Nora is to blame for the fire at Guillermo's house. Upon learning that Majo is brain dead, Helena begins to remember the beautiful moments she spent with her only best friend. Patricia manages to seduce Hector and he falls for her charms. Valentina learns that it was Leonardo who hurt Majo. Guillermo discovers that the fire at his house was arson.
102	"Que caiga todo el peso de la ley"	14 September 2021	21 September 2021	1.62
When Patricia finds out that Ricardo got Camila pregnant, she confesses that Valentina is Guillermo's real daughter. Yolanda asks Nora for a favor. Valentina tries to convince Helena to donate Majo's heart to Carlitos. Yolanda asks Ricardo to keep an eye on Nora since she is sure that she has something to do with Ulises and his spy network and warns him that if they find the culprits, they will suffer the worst punishment. Guillermo informs the family that the house fire was arson so he is willing to find the culprits. Lucha is convinced that Nora was the culprit in the fire at Guillermo's house, so she asks Meche to help her look for the evidence. Guillermo asks Claudio to proceed against whoever is responsible for the fire at his house and discovers that Nora is the culprit. Valentina arrives at Majo's room and is shocked to meet Judith, Majo’s twin. Rosa María tells Judith about her sister's health and the possibility of her becoming a donor, but Judith sets a very important condition.
103	"El amor no se puede forzar"	15 September 2021	22 September 2021	1.63
Judith informs Rosa Maria that she wants 10 million pesos in exchange for Majo's heart, otherwise she will not authorize the donation. Yolanda wants to check Beba's cell phone to find out who is betraying her. Claudio realizes that Horacio is in danger as he is willing to confront Regino with Héctor’s help. Nora suspects that the family that Yolanda destroyed is her father's family. Valentina is willing to convince Judith to donate Majo's organs. Guillermo summons Helena to his office with the purpose of reconciliation; however, they remember their past and fight. Héctor leaves his house and is beaten by Leonardo to the point of unconsciousness, Consuelo realizes that the young man that was being beaten is Héctor.
104	"No ruegues amor a quien no sabe darlo"	16 September 2021	23 September 2021	1.54
Héctor is taken to the hospital after a terrible beating by Leonardo. David is opposed to taking medication to control the pain he is suffering, as he remembers the distressing past he had. Judith does not want to donate her sister's organs, only if it is in exchange for a large sum of money. Nora plans to use David to separate Guillermo from Rosa Maria. Helena learns of Héctor's serious health condition and goes to the hospital, but discovers that Patricia is there. Héctor is surprised by Helena's presence at the hospital, but Patricia interrupts them to confess the affair they had. Rosa María hears Leonardo confess the crime he committed with Majo. Nora discovers that Guillermo will cede the rights to the ranch to Patricia and the confrontation provokes a crisis in Guillermo.
105	"Asuntos pendientes"	17 September 2021	24 September 2021	1.53
Ricardo reiterates to Valentina that he did marry for love, but she asks him to tell her what he talked about with his father the day he separated them. Judith sees that Guillermo needs a heart transplant and reminds Rosa Maria of her offer. Valentina manages to recover Helena's camera and hopes to find some videos that can lift her friend's spirits; however, she discovers a truth. Yolanda asks to check Beba's cell phone because she suspects that she is Uriel's accomplice. Helena, seeing that her father is torn between life and death, decides to visit him in the hospital and assures him that this is not the time to think about the past, but he makes a confession. Horacio confronts Regino, putting his life in danger. Helena finds Patricia kissing Enrique and does not hesitate to slap her. Valentina confronts Nora with the idea that she could be the cause of the fire in Guillermo's house.
106	"Aceptar los errores"	20 September 2021	27 September 2021	1.69
When Enrique learns that Patricia slept with Héctor, he assures her that he no longer wants to have anything to do with her despite the promise they made to each other, so he gives her the documents of the ranch and asks her to get Guillermo's signature. Horacio manages to beat Regino in the fight, but is badly injured. Valentina shows the videos to Guillermo and discovers that Estela was actually unfaithful to him, which upsets him. Ricardo swears unconditional love to Camila and her baby. Valentina shows Helena a video of her mother with her lover and she verifies Estela's betrayal, so Valentina informs her that her father is sorry because he wasted many years away from her. David assures Rosa María that he wants to be Guillermo's heart donor. Helena arrives at Guillermo's house and upon seeing each other, they don't hesitate to give each other a hug. Ricardo confesses to Camila the fraud he committed and she asks him to tell Valentina the whole truth.
107	"No te va a salvar ni Dios"	21 September 2021	28 September 2021	1.71
Nora informs Yolanda that Guillermo is in poor health and assures her that she does not want her father to die, while Yolanda makes it clear that since they are very similar, she could become her successor. Lizia betrays Enrique and sends an e-mail alerting Guillermo about his employee's dirty dealings. Consuelo gets into Leonardo's car and discovers that he beat Héctor and confesses it to Horacio. Héctor assures Patricia that the only thing he can offer her is his friendship. Guillermo wants to know who wrote the letter and caused the estrangement with his daughter Helena. Yolanda makes it clear to Nora that she already knows that she is not Guillermo's daughter. Lucha and Meche tell Adelaida that Nora was to blame for the fire in the house. Ricardo confesses to Valentina that he stole from his father in order to get revenge for everything he did to him and does not hesitate to reveal that she is the real daughter of Guillermo Vargas.
108	"Se va a hacer justicia"	22 September 2021	30 September 2021	1.54
Claudio asks Valentina to be careful with Nora because it is very likely that she will betray her again. Valentina learns that she is being accused of tax fraud because of the bank account that Ricardo opened in her name, but Claudio assures her that he will help her to get out of trouble. Camila asks Ricardo to divorce Valentina. Ricardo confesses to Camila that he plans to declare that he opened the bank account behind Valentina's back to prove that she is innocent. Enrique discovers that Lizia stole all his money. Leonardo threatens Horacio about the treasure he is guarding. Leonardo tries to sell the jewels he stole from Horacio and discovers that they belonged to a former Empress. Ricardo is afraid of Patricia's reaction when she learns that he stole the money from her father. Valentina assures Nora that she already knows that she is Guillermo's real daughter and confirms that she is sure she betrayed her, Nora accepts her evil and reveals the reasons why she hates her so much. Valentina demands Nora to be the one to tell Guillermo the whole truth.
109	"Soy capaz de todo"	23 September 2021	1 October 2021	1.57
Adelaida discovers Enrique's fraud and does not hesitate to confront him. Patricia is convinced that Valentina will not tell on Nora. Consuelo confirms to Helena that her parents did love each other, but Yolanda's wickedness separated them. Now that she knows the truth, Valentina is willing to help Helena and between the two of them they will be able to fulfill their dreams. Helena shares with Consuelo that Leonardo caused Majo's accident. Guillermo confronts Enrique and asks the police to arrest him. Nora, seeing that she could lose her fortune now that Valentina knows the truth, is ready to get her out of her way. Héctor complains to Leonardo for abandoning his daughter and assures him that he gave up his plans in order to give Mina a home. Valentina confirms to Ricardo that she will return the money in exchange for him to let her be happy with Claudio.
110	"Un as bajo la manga"	24 September 2021	4 October 2021	1.67
Nora assures Beba that in reality Yolanda has no friends and spends most of the day with them, so she does not doubt that it is Patricia who may be betraying her. Horacio threatens Leonardo with a gun to get him to let Héctor go. Héctor assures Helena that he should have been smarter to support her and reiterates that he will not betray her again. Nora assures Patricia that she will find out what she is up to. Guillermo learns that David wants to donate his heart. Judith returns to Guillermo's office and confesses to him that life should not be conditioned, so she will begin the process to donate Majo's heart, he offers her a job as a thank you. Leonardo takes advantage of the situation at home and through an anonymous phone call asks for five million pesos in return of Mina's freedom. Nora begins to put ideas to Yolanda against Patricia.
111	"Tomar medidas extremas"	27 September 2021	5 October 2021	1.66
Beba and Uriel continue with their plan to take down Yolanda Pratas, but in order not to be discovered, Uriel dresses up as a woman so they can meet, but when they make clear the points to follow, Beba and Uriel say goodbye with a kiss. Patricia plans to use Mina to get Héctor to marry her. Nora questions Valentina about her future plans and she discovers that none of them include Claudio, so she is sure that when she talks to Claudio she will be able to convince him to stay with her. Ricardo discovers that Mina is in Patricia's apartment and is attacked by Leonardo, so Leonardo threatens Patricia that if she says anything he will attack Mina. Héctor, seeing that Leonardo has Mina, decides to confront him, putting his life in danger. Guillermo thanks Majo for being an excellent person, Helena listens to the words her father dedicated to her best friend and does not hesitate to hug him.
112	"Un amor para siempre"	28 September 2021	6 October 2021	1.75
Guillermo, knowing that Carlitos is debating between life and death, decides to reject Majo's heart and proposes that it should be donated to Carlitos. Patricia tells Héctor what really happened with Leonardo. Héctor swears to Mina that he will always be with her. Ricardo takes advantage of being alone with Patricia and confesses that he has already revealed the whole truth to Valentina. Claudio is questioned by Valentina about his future plans and she shares with him that she wants to study to present her collection as Helena did in Madrid. Consuelo discovers that Leonardo is Mina's real father, so when she sees that he made an attempt on his own daughter's life, she decides to kick him out of the house and not to know anything about him. Valentina does not hesitate to reveal to Helena that she is her real sister. Claudio begins with the divorce proceedings of Valentina and Ricardo, but when he wants to obtain the marriage certificate, he realizes that it is not registered in the system and discovers a secret of Ricardo.
113	"Ese matrimonio nunca existió"	29 September 2021	8 October 2021	1.74
Patricia asks Nora to work as a team now that she knows she is not Guillermo's daughter. Valentina tells Helena and Adelaida that Patricia did a DNA test and found out the truth. Leonardo threatens Yolanda with showing the video of Camila. Leonardo, trying to escape from the police, goes up the stairs of Yolanda's atelier, but he meets Judith and when he sees her he thinks she is Majo, he loses his balance and falls from the second floor. Consuelo asks Héctor for forgiveness for all the harm she caused him. Ricardo informs Claudio that Valentina's safety is in danger after he told Patricia that he wanted a divorce, so Claudio assures him that a divorce is not necessary, since they were never married. After Leonardo's accident, Yolanda shares with Beba that everyone gets what they deserve. Nora is impressed to see Majo's sister in Yolanda's atelier.
114	"Muerto en vida"	30 September 2021	11 October 2021	1.72
Valentina confesses to Helena that in her life plan she does not see herself with Claudio since he has other plans very different from hers, so she believes they are not destined to be together. Patricia falls into Beba's trap. Ulises is photographed by Yolanda's detective. Nora questions Claudio if he is willing to give up his dreams to follow Valentina's dreams. The doctor informs Consuelo that after the accident, Leonardo will no longer have mobility in his body. Leonardo confesses to his mother that he caused Majo’s accident because he did not want his son to be born. Judith takes advantage of the fact that Leonardo is in the hospital to impersonate a nurse and thus reveal to him that she got revenge for what he did to Majo. Valentina tells Nora that Adelaida already knows that she is Guillermo's daughter and gives her a day to tell her father the truth. Rosa María informs Helena that it is time to disconnect Majo. Nora proposes a plan to Patricia so that the two of them don't end up on the street.
115	"Si nos amamos podemos con todo"	1 October 2021	12 October 2021	1.54
Helena arrives at the hospital to say goodbye to her friend Majo, who is about to enter the operating room to begin the organ donation. Patricia wants to silence Enrique so that she does not end up in jail. Patricia sends men to beat up Enrique in jail, but he goes crazy to the point of shaving his head. After learning of Guillermo's decision, Judith assures him that she admires him even more. Nora does not hesitate to denounce Valentina. Héctor, seeing how badly Leonardo is suffering, offers him his support, but Leonardo rejects him and reveals his hatred, assuring him that he does not regret all the harm he did to him. Adelaida congratulates Beba and Uriel for the good work they have done to unmask Yolanda. Claudio and Valentina vow to support each other to fulfill their dreams.
116	"Pagar el precio"	4 October 2021	13 October 2021	1.60
Patricia takes advantage of being with Héctor to let him know that she has been showing signs of pregnancy lately. Horacio feels very proud of how great Valentina and Helena are, so he is sure that Guillermo has the best daughters. Guillermo, knowing that he is in very delicate health, proposes Claudio to take charge of his business and the foundation. Nora is willing to silence Adelaida so that she does not reveal the truth. Patricia obtains a positive pregnancy test and looks for Héctor. Valentina does not want Claudio to give up his dreams. Guillermo threatens Yolanda and assures her that he will recover the workshop that once belonged to his daughter Helena. Nora will feel betrayed by Patricia. Adelaida faints after drinking the tea to which Nora put some drops to kill her.
117	"Valentina es detenida"	5 October 2021	14 October 2021	1.53
Camila is ready to start a new life, so she decides to face her reality by removing the patch she wears to hide the scar left by the plane crash. Yolanda assures Nora that they must prepare for a new battle. Rosa María informs Guillermo that Adelaida was poisoned. Ricardo confesses to Patricia that he stole all the money from Armando so he could elope with Valentina, but thanks to her ratting them out, she ruined his future. Helena, Consuelo and Valentina receive great news about their fashion show. Adelaida, seeing that an attempt was made on her life, decides to confess to Guillermo who his real daughter is. Valentina is arrested for tax evasion. Adelaida mocks Nora and assures her that this time her plan failed since she could not finish her off and reveals that she already confessed the whole truth to Guillermo. Patricia informs Héctor that she is pregnant.
118	"Yolanda Pratas es un fraude"	6 October 2021	15 October 2021	1.63
Patricia takes advantage of Helena's arrival at her apartment to reveal that she is expecting Héctor's child. Guillermo learns that Valentina will remain under the protection of the authorities while the trial takes place. Consuelo surprises Yolanda in her workshop and takes advantage of the press to present the evidence that Yolanda has stolen the designs of the dresses that she presents as hers. Claudio demonstrates with a video that it was Ricardo who extracted all the money, but for the judge, it is not enough evidence of Valentina's innocence. Guillermo shows his support to Valentina and reveals that he already knows that she is really his daughter, so he asks her to call him dad. Valentina obtains her freedom. Nora seeks Guillermo's forgiveness, but he confronts her. Ricardo, feeling ill, says goodbye to Patricia and makes it clear that he always saw her as a mother.
119	"¿Te quieres casar conmigo?"	7 October 2021	18 October 2021	1.85
Claudio surprises Valentina with a serenade and takes advantage of the romantic moment to ask her to marry him. Valentina learns that Nora put her in jail, but asks Guillermo to forgive Nora. Héctor and Helena arrive at Patricia's apartment and discover that Ricardo is dead, Patricia goes crazy and wants to hurt Helena. Leonardo asks Héctor to kill him. Nora is humiliated in the street. Yolanda threatens Helena to ruin her fashion now and reveals that she caused her mother's death. Nora, seeing Valentina's success, will not allow her to continue to succeed and is ready to take revenge. Horacio proposes to Consuelo. Nora arrives at the fashion show.
120	"Que el amor te acompañe hoy y siempre"	8 October 2021	19 October 2021	1.76
Nora closes Valentina and Helena's fashion show with the dress she stole from Camila, without imagining that Yolanda had poisoned the dress. Valentina cries inconsolably at the loss of her sister. Yolanda seeks to kill Helena. Yolanda is sent to prison and seeing that Patricia has gone mad, she does not hesitate to make fun of her, but Patricia shows her who is in charge in prison. After a family gathering at his house, Guillermo’s heart begins to feel sick and asks Rosa María not to take him to the hospital because he wants to die at home with the people he loves the most. Finally Valentina achieves her dream of marrying Claudio and in the company of her loved ones they swear eternal love. Valentina assures Consuelo that she has been more than a mother to her. Claudio celebrates that he can finally be with Valentina and assures her that he will be in charge of giving her love every day, while she swears that she will be by his side to make him forget the bad times. Helena tells Héctor that she is pregnant.
