= Bendita mentira =

Mexican telenovela

- Genre: Telenovela; Romance; Drama
- Created by: Inés Rodena
- Written by: Celia Alonso; Andrea Ordóñez; Lila Yolanda Andrade; Tere Medina; Alberto Aridjis
- Directed by: Lorenzo de Rodas; Karina Duprez
- Starring: Angélica María; Mariana Levy; Sergio Catalán; Ana Patricia Rojo; Ramón Abascal; Marisol Mijares; Joel Núñez
- Opening theme: Bendita mentira by Angélica María
- Country of origin: Mexico
- Original language: Spanish
- No. of episodes: 90

Production
- Executive producer: Carlos Moreno Laguillo
- Producer: Jorge Lozano Soriano
- Production locations: Filming; Televisa San Ángel; Mexico City, Mexico
- Cinematography: Juan Carlos Frutos; Luis Toledo
- Running time: 41-44 minutes
- Production company: Televisa

Original release
- Network: Canal de las Estrellas
- Release: August 5 – December 6, 1996

Related
- Corazón de madre (1969); Soledad (1980-1981)

Bendita mentira (English: Blessed Lie) is a Mexican telenovela produced by Carlos Moreno Laguillo for Televisa in 1996. On August 5, 1996, Canal de las Estrellas started broadcasting Bendita mentira weekdays at 5:00pm, replacing Para toda la vida. The last episode was broadcast on December 6, 1996 with Luz Clarita replacing it the following Monday.

== Cast ==
- Angélica María as Esperanza Martinez de de la Mora
- Mariana Levy as Carolina
- Sergio Catalán as Diego de la Mora
- Ana Patricia Rojo as Mireya de la Mora
- Ramón Abascal as Fabricio de la Mora
- Marisol Mijares as Liliana "Lili" de la Mora
- Joel Núñez as Saúl de la Mora
- Constantino Costas as David Grajales/Teo
- Mariana Karr as Mariana
- Alejandra Meyer as Petronila
- Angélica Vale as Margarita
- Zully Keith as Flora
- José María Torre as Benny
- Karla Graham as Jessica
- Evita Muñoz "Chachita" as Goya
- Héctor Gómez as Don Erasmo de la Mora
- Guillermo Aguilar as Fernando Zambrano
- Socorro Avelar as Veneranda
- María Idalia as Julia
- Marina Marín as Gloria
- Alicia Montoya as Virtudes
- Gabriela Murray as Aurora
- Julio Monterde as Benjamín
- Maty Huitrón as Ramona
- Guillermo Rivas as Father Roque
- Susana Lozano as Maripaz
- Beatriz Martínez as Amelia
- Sergio Sánchez as Edgardo
- Riccardo Dalmacci as Angelo Fontanelli
- María Prado as Ruperta
- Rubén Morales as Ramiro
- Salvador Ibarra as Agustín
- Plutarco Haza as Dr. Sandoval
- Fabián Ibarra as Omar
- Fernando Torres Lapham
- Dolores Solana
- Luis Ferrer
- Luis Bernardos
- Moulay Peralta
- José Luis Sedeno
- Susana Ruiz
- Arturo Lorca
- Luis Ferrer
- Jesús Carrasco
- Néstor Leoncio

== Awards ==
Year	Award	Category	Nominee	Result
1997	15th TVyNovelas Awards	Best Antagonist Actress	Ana Patricia Rojo	Nominated
1997	15th TVyNovelas Awards	Best Leading Actress	Angélica María	Won
1997	15th TVyNovelas Awards	Best Co-lead Actress	Mariana Levy	Nominated
1997	15th TVyNovelas Awards	Best Male Revelation	Sergio Catalán	Nominated
