= Mi verdad oculta =

- Genre: Telenovela
- Based on: Amanda by Luis Ponce
- Developed by: Martha Carrillo; Cristina García
- Directed by: Nelinho Acosta; Luis Eduardo Reyes
- Starring: Susana González; David Chocarro; Andrés Palacios
- Theme music composer: Gustavo Farías
- Opening theme: "Mi verdad oculta" by Lucero
- Composer: Xavier Asali
- Country of origin: Mexico
- Original language: Spanish
- No. of seasons: 1
- No. of episodes: 82

Production
- Executive producer: Carlos Moreno
- Producer: Hilda Santaella Hernández
- Editors: Alfredo Sánchez Díaz; Daniel Rentería Carmona; Viridiana Murillo Barroso
- Camera setup: Multi-camera
- Production company: TelevisaUnivision

Original release
- Network: Las Estrellas
- Release: 10 November 2025 – 1 March 2026

Mi verdad oculta (English: My Secret Truth) is a Mexican telenovela produced by Carlos Moreno for TelevisaUnivision. It is based on the 2016 Chilean telenovela Amanda, created by Luis Ponce. The series stars Susana González, David Chocarro and Andrés Palacios. It aired on Las Estrellas from 10 November 2025 to 1 March 2026.

== Plot ==
Aitana is a nurse hired by Eloísa Arenas, an elderly woman who needs special care. Aitana strives to care for Eloísa and earn her trust, but her approach has an underlying motive, as she was abused by her patient's sons and has returned to seek justice. Eloísa's sons are Luciano, Iñigo, Mateo, and Bruno. Aitana arrives at the estate with the intention of gaining the trust of each of the brothers and thus, little by little, carrying out her plan.

Aitana is surprised to run into Zacarías, the livestock technician at the Lizárraga ranch, who immediately recognizes her. Aitana was certain that Zacarías no longer worked for the family and that she would never see him again. For him, she was his first love, and she disappeared from his life without a trace. He has not forgotten her, despite believing her to be dead or missing. Although he is in a relationship with Ximena, Zacarías becomes unconditionally devoted to Aitana, which causes conflict between them. Carrying out her plans, Aitana begins to feel attracted to Luciano, and this torments her.

== Cast ==
=== Main ===
- Susana González as Aitana Fernández / Adriana Rodríguez
  - Karla Esquivel as young Adriana
- David Chocarro as Luciano Lizárraga Arenas
- Andrés Palacios as Zacarías Castillo Pérez
  - Christian Ramos as young Zacarías
- Chris Pazcal as Mateo Lizárraga Arenas
- Geraldine Bazán as Larisa Rubido
- Ferdinando Valencia as Iñigo Lizárraga Arenas
- Michel Duval as Bruno Lizárraga Arenas
- Rosa María Bianchi as Eloísa Arenas de Lizárraga
- Luis Felipe Tovar as Juventino Castillo
- Alma Delfina as Clementina Pérez
- Irán Castillo as Nuria Campuzano de Lizárraga
- Fernando Alonso as Juan José Palacios
- Mayra Rojas as Micaela Guerrero
- Isadora González as Karime
- Ana Paula Martínez as Belinda Lizárraga Ortiz
- Michelle Marie Colón as Ximena Ortega
- Erick García as Gael Corral Pérez
- Nina Rubín as Cecilia Campuzano
- David Calderón as Negro
- Mariano Meouchi as Rolando
- Fernando Manzano
- María Marcela as Miriam Fernández
- Rafaella Gavira as Erika Lizárraga Campuzano
- Paula Perez Rocha as Hanna Lizárraga Campuzano
- Fernando Ciangherotti as Amador Rubido

=== Recurring and guest stars ===
- Alfredo Gatica as Lomelí
- Moma Moreno as Catalina "Caty" Mendoza
- Desirée Medina as Florencia
- Raúl Vega
- Marcos Montero as Tomás

== Production ==
On 1 July 2025, Susana González, David Chocarro and Andrés Palacios were announced in the lead roles of Asignatura pendiente, produced by Carlos Moreno. On 14 July 2025, Mi verdad oculta was announced as the official title of the telenovela. Filming of the telenovela took place from 21 July to 20 November 2025.

== Ratings ==
Viewership and ratings per season of Mi verdad oculta
Season	Timeslot (CT)	Episodes	First aired		Last aired		Avg. viewers (millions)
Season	Timeslot (CT)	Episodes	Date	Viewers (millions)	Date	Viewers (millions)	Avg. viewers (millions)
1	Mon–Fri 6:30 p.m.	64	10 November 2025	4.09	1 March 2026	4.14	3.96

== Episodes ==
No.	Title	Original release date	Mexico viewers (millions)
1	"Sé bien quién es ella"	10 November 2025 (Note: Premiered early online through Las Estrellas website on 7 November 2025.)	4.09
2	"Ellos son como lobos"	11 November 2025	3.81
3	"Un matrimonio por conveniencia"	12 November 2025	4.53
4	"¡Larisa tiene un amante!"	13 November 2025	3.72
5	"Entre tú y yo no hay futuro"	14 November 2025	3.86
6	"Nadie debe hacernos daño"	17 November 2025	3.90
7	"Tienes que proteger a Ximena"	18 November 2025	3.92
8	"Perdí a mi familia"	19 November 2025	4.33
9	"El único con las manos limpias"	20 November 2025	3.96
10	"La única que pudo hacerlo"	21 November 2025	3.45
11	"Quiero tu silencio, no tu opinión"	24 November 2025	3.94
12	"No pertenezco a esta familia"	25 November 2025	4.31
13	"Viviré eternamente agradecido"	26 November 2025	4.34
14	"Mi felicidad será su castigo"	27 November 2025	4.01
15	"Mateo mató a Lobo"	28 November 2025	4.39
16	"Vamos a hacer justicia juntos"	1 December 2025	3.75
17	"Su propia miseria los va a hundir"	2 December 2025	3.98
18	"Tenemos que hacer algo drástico"	3 December 2025	3.86
19	"Todos van a caer"	4 December 2025	4.04
20	"Hay dolores que no pasan"	5 December 2025	3.95
21	"Seré el salvador de la familia"	8 December 2025	N/A
22	"Mateo se merece ese dolor"	9 December 2025	3.80
23	"Podemos ser un buen equipo"	10 December 2025	3.98
24	"Para un beso se necesitan dos"	11 December 2025	3.74
25	"Yo soy tu futuro"	12 December 2025	3.88
26	"Tu carroza se convirtió en calabaza"	15 December 2025	4.03
27	"Asumámoslo ante el mundo"	16 December 2025	4.17
28	"Guárdate tus promesas"	17 December 2025	3.94
29	"¿Hay dos Lucianos?"	18 December 2025	N/A
30	"La duda me está matando"	19 December 2025	N/A
31	"No te quiero en mi vida"	22 December 2025	N/A
32	"El responsable de mi abuso fue Luciano Lomelí"	23 December 2025	N/A
33	"Adriana y Aitana son la misma persona"	24 December 2025	N/A
34	"Maté a Luciano Lomelí"	25 December 2025	N/A
35	"¿No murió?"	26 December 2025	N/A
36	"Tu hija no murió"	29 December 2025	N/A
37	"Zacarías puede ser su padre"	30 December 2025	N/A
38	"Hay un testigo menos"	31 December 2025	N/A
39	"Yo asumo la paternidad"	1 January 2026	N/A
40	"Iñigo me traicionó"	2 January 2026	N/A
41	"Traicionaste a la familia"	5 January 2026	4.44
42	"Conmigo nadie juega"	6 January 2026	4.03
43	"Tu juego conmigo se terminó"	7 January 2026	4.18
44	"No te conviene ponerte en mi contra"	8 January 2026	4.06
45	"Terminé con Larisa"	9 January 2026	3.92
46	"El amor lo cura todo"	12 January 2026	3.55
47	"No quiero que me encuentre"	13 January 2026	3.94
48	"De mis hijos no hago uno"	14 January 2026	N/A
49	"Nuestro amor se lo merece"	15 January 2026	4.26
50	"La vida da sorpresas crueles"	16 January 2026	3.74
51	"El último heredero"	19 January 2026	3.66
52	"El que nada debe, nada teme"	20 January 2026	3.92
53	"Una víctima de tu familia"	21 January 2026	4.07
54	"¡Encontré a mi mamá!"	22 January 2026	3.97
55	"Mi vida va a cambiar"	23 January 2026	4.04
56	"Atada de pies y manos"	26 January 2026	3.73
57	"¡Yo soy su madre!"	27 January 2026	3.82
58	"¡No seas cobarde!"	28 January 2026	3.90
59	"Voy a exigir mi herencia"	29 January 2026	3.84
60	"La pesadilla se terminó"	30 January 2026	3.88
61	"Cásate conmigo"	2 February 2026	3.64
62	"Prefiero decirte adiós"	3 February 2026	3.69
63	"No pienso ceder lo nuestro"	4 February 2026	3.43
64	"¡Mataste a Mateo!"	5 February 2026	4.33
65	"¿Cual es tu juego?"	6 February 2026	3.64
66	"Tu novio es un pervertido"	9 February 2026	3.90
67	"Durmiendo con el enemigo"	10 February 2026	3.89
68	"¡Renuncio!"	11 February 2026	4.07
69	"Tu tiempo está corriendo"	12 February 2026	3.69
70	"Luciano no es como nosotros"	13 February 2026	3.89
71	"Belinda no puede saberlo"	16 February 2026	4.06
72	"Sin denuncia, no hay delito"	17 February 2026	3.79
73	"Ese bebé no va a nacer"	18 February 2026	4.14
74	"¿Quién es mi familia?"	19 February 2026	3.98
75	"El llamado de la sangre"	20 February 2026	3.77
76	"Estamos a punto de lograrlo"	23 February 2026	4.16
77	"Nunca es tarde para el amor"	24 February 2026	4.33
78	"Estás fuera de mi testamento"	25 February 2026	3.74
79	"Tu familia es parte de mi pasado"	26 February 2026	4.33
80	"No voy a tener compasión"	27 February 2026	4.07
81	"Ojalá Dios te perdone"	1 March 2026	4.14
82	"Con amor, todo es posible"	1 March 2026	4.14
