= Carlos Moreno (producer) =

Mexican telenovelas producer

Carlos Moreno Laguillo
- Born: Mexico
- Occupation: Producer
- Years active: 1996-present
- Relatives: Maricarmen Moreno (sister)

Carlos Moreno Laguillo (born in Mexico) is a Mexican telenovelas producer.

== Filmography ==
Executive Producer, Associate Producer
Year	Title	Notes
1996	Bendita mentira	Associate Producer
1999	Nunca te olvidaré	Associate Producer
1999	Nunca te olvidaré	Executive Producer
2001	El secreto	Executive Producer
2003-04	Bajo la misma piel	Executive Producer
2005	Sueños y caramelos	Executive Producer
2008-09	En nombre del amor	Executive Producer
2010-11	Cuando me enamoro	Executive Producer
2012	Amor bravío	Executive Producer
2013-14	Quiero Amarte	Executive Producer
2015-16	A que no me dejas	Executive Producer
2016	Mujeres de negro	Executive Producer
2018	Y mañana será otro día	Executive Producer
2021	Fuego ardiente	Executive Producer
2022-23	Mi secreto	Executive Producer
2024	Mi amor sin tiempo	Executive Producer
2024	Juegos interrumpidos	Executive Producer
2025-26	Mi verdad oculta	Executive Producer
2027	Luz de mis noches	Executive Producer

== Awards and nominations ==
=== Premios TVyNovelas ===
Year	Category	Telenovela	Result
2011	Best Telenovela of the Year	Cuando me enamoro	Nominated
2013	Best Telenovela of the Year	Amor bravío	Nominated
2016	Best Telenovela of the Year	A que no me dejas	Nominated
2016	Best Cast	A que no me dejas	Nominated

=== Premios ACE ===
Year	Category	Telenovela	Result
2010	Best Telenovela	En nombre del amor	Won

=== Premios People en Español ===
Year	Category	Telenovela	Result
2009	Best Remake	En nombre del amor	Nominated
