= Magda Karina =

Mexican actress (born 1966)

- Born: Magdalena Karina Talamantes Descalzó; July 27, 1966 (age 59); Mexico City, Mexico
- Other name: Karina Ancira
- Occupation: Actress
- Years active: 1982–present

Magda Karina (born Magdalena Karina Talamantes Descalzó on July 27, 1966) is a Mexican actress.

== Biography ==
Karina was born on July 27, 1966, in Mexico City, Mexico. She is the daughter of actress and director Karina Duprez and granddaughter of actress Magda Guzmán and theater director Julián Duprez. By the marriage of his mother with actor Carlos Ancira, she became his adopted daughter.

She began her acting career while still a child, debuting in theater at sixteen years old in theatrical performance El soldadito de plomo. On television she debuted in the telenovela Déjame vivir in 1982.

In recent years, Magda Karina has used a new artistic name in some television works as Karina Ancira, adopting her stepfather's last name, Carlos Ancira.

== Filmography ==
| Year | Title | Role | Notes |
|---|---|---|---|
| 1982 | Déjame vivir | Mercedes | Recurring role |
| 1983-84 | Amalia Batista | Iris | Recurring role |
| 1984 | Guadalupe | Rosario "Chayo" Pereyra | Supporting role |
| 1986-87 | Cicatrices del alma | Gabriela | Supporting role |
| 1987 | Cuna de lobos | Lucero "Lucerito" Espejel | Supporting role |
| 1987-88 | Rosa salvaje | Angélica | Supporting role |
| 1988 | Dos vidas | Eloísa | Supporting role |
| 1989 | El cristal empañado | Luisa | Supporting role |
| 1990-91 | Amor de nadie | Elisa Hernández | Supporting role |
| 1991-92 | Valeria y Maximiliano | Nydia Ramos | Co-protagonist |
| 1994-96 | Mujer, casos de la vida real | | 2 Episodes |
| 1996 | Canción de amor | Jessica | Supporting role |
| 1996 | La antorcha encendida | Brígida Almonte | Recurring role |
| 1997 | Los hijos de nadie | Yolanda | Guest star |
| 1998 | Rencor apasionado | Marina Rangel | Main cast |
| 2005 | Alborada | Sara de Oviedo (young) | Guest star |
| 2009 | Mi pecado | Delfina "Fina" Solís | Supporting role |
| 2010-11 | Cuando me enamoro | Maritza Del Río/Blanca Ocampo/Dominique de la Rivera | Supporting role |
| 2011 | La rosa de Guadalupe | Rosalba/Aurora/Mirta/Soledad/Mercedes | 4 Episodes |
| 2011-12 | Dos hogares | Aura | Guest star |
| 2012-13 | La mujer del Vendaval | Sagrario Aldama de Reyna | Supporting role |
| 2014-15 | La sombra del pasado | Teresina "Tere" | Guest star |
| 2017 | Enamorándome de Ramón | Reyna | Guest star |
| 2018 | Tenías que ser tú | Covadonga | Guest star |
| 2018-19 | Por amar sin ley | Sonia Reyes | Supporting role |
| 2019 | Lorenza | Juana Guadarrama | TV series |
| 2023 | Perdona nuestros pecados | Clemencia | Recurring role |
| 2024 | Vivir de amor | Alma Trejo | |
| 2024–25 | Amor amargo | Alicia Sánchez | |
