= Karina Duprez =

Mexican director and actress (1946–2026)

- Born: Karina Julia Descalzó Guzmán; 23 December 1946; Mexico City, Mexico
- Died: 22 April 2026 (aged 79)
- Occupations: Actress, director
- Years active: Actress (1960s–1990); Director (1989–2026)
- Spouse: Carlos Ancira (1979–1987; his death)
- Children: Magda Karina
- Parent(s): Magda Guzmán; Julián Duprez
- Relatives: Gerardo & Mirtha (siblings) Carlos (half-brother)

Karina Duprez Guzmán (Note: In this Mexican name, the surname is Duprez and the second or maternal family name is Guzmán.) (23 December 1946 – 22 April 2026) was a Mexican director and television and film actress.

== Life and career ==
Duprez was born in Mexico City on 23 December 1946. She was a daughter of actress Magda Guzmán and Julián Duprez. She had two siblings, Gerardo and Mirtha Duprez, and one half-brother, Carlos Falcón, from her mother's second marriage.

She was the mother of actress Magda Karina. In 1979, she married actor Carlos Ancira. Their marriage lasted until his death in 1987.

At the age of 5, she participated in the theatrical production of Juegos prohibidos. She later studied acting at the Andres Soller Academy, then at the National Institute of Fine Arts and the Faculty of Philosophy and Literature at the National Autonomous University of Mexico. She then went to London to study theater directing. She made her television and film debut in the mid-1960s.

Duprez died on 22 April 2026, at the age of 79.

== Filmography ==
Year	Title	Role	Notes
1973	Los miserables	Obrera	Recurring role
1974/77	Mundo de juguete	Matilde	Recurring role
1977	La venganza	Lucía "Lucy"	Main antagonist
1982/83	Vivir enamorada	Karina	Protagonist
1985	Juana Iris	Rosa	Supporting role
1987	Rosa salvaje	María Elena Torres de Robles	Supporting role
1989	El cristal empañado	Karla	Supporting role
1989/90	Balada por un amor	—N/a	Director (1st Part)
1990	La fuerza del amor		Recurring role
1992/93	Tenías que ser tú	—N/a	Director
1994/95	Agujetas de color de rosa	—N/a	Director
1996	Para toda la vida	—N/a	Director (1st Part)
1996	Bendita mentira	—N/a	Director
1997	Los hijos de nadie	—N/a	Director
1997	Esmeralda	—N/a	Director
1998	La usurpadora	—N/a	Director (1st Part)
1998	Gotita de amor	—N/a	Director
1999	Rosalinda	—N/a	Director
1999	Alma rebelde	—N/a	Director (2nd Part)
2001	Mujer bonita	—N/a	Director
2005	Sueños y caramelos	—N/a	Director
2007/08	Pasión	—N/a	Director
2008/09	En nombre del amor	—N/a	Director
2009	Sortilegio	—N/a	Director (2nd Part)
2010/11	Cuando me enamoro	—N/a	Director (1st Part)
2011–?	La rosa de Guadalupe	—N/a	Director
2016	Por siempre Joan Sebastian	—N/a	Director (1st Part)
2018	Y mañana será otro día	—N/a	Director

== Awards and nominations ==
Year	Award	Category	Telenovela	Result
2006	TVyNovelas Awards	Best Direction	Sueños y caramelos	Nominated
2008	TVyNovelas Awards	Best Direction	Pasión	Nominated
2010	TVyNovelas Awards	Best Direction	Sortilegio	Won
