= Daniela Álvarez =

Daniela Álvarez may refer to:

- Daniela Álvarez (model) (born 1993), Mexican beauty pageant titleholder
- Daniela Álvarez (tennis) (born 1983), Bolivian professional tennis player
- Daniela Álvarez Mendoza (born 2001), Spanish beach volleyball player

== See also ==
- Daniella Álvarez, Colombian model
