= Fugitivas, en busca de la libertad =

- Genre: Telenovela
- Based on: Preciosas by Diego Muñoz
- Developed by: Lucero Suárez; Jimena Merodio
- Written by: Carmen Sepúlveda; Luis Reynoso
- Directed by: Jorge Robles; Santiago Barbosa
- Starring: Arap Bethke; Erika Buenfil; César Évora; Juan Martín Jáuregui; Arturo Carmona; Daniela Álvarez
- Theme music composer: Jordi Bachbush
- Opening theme: "Fugitivas" by Jordi Bachbush
- Composer: Christian Moreno
- Country of origin: Mexico
- Original language: Spanish
- No. of seasons: 1
- No. of episodes: 80

Production
- Executive producer: Lucero Suárez
- Producer: Ángel Villaverde
- Editors: Rodrigo Morales; Socorro Manrique
- Camera setup: Multi-camera
- Production company: TelevisaUnivision

Original release
- Network: Las Estrellas
- Release: 1 July – 18 October 2024

Fugitivas, en busca de la libertad (English: Fugitives, Seeking Justice) is a Mexican telenovela produced by Lucero Suárez for TelevisaUnivision. It is an adaptation of the 2016 Chilean telenovela Preciosas, created by Diego Muñoz. The series stars Daniela Álvarez, Sachi Tamashiro, Rocío de Santiago, Marlene Kalb, Arap Bethke and Erika Buenfil. It aired on Las Estrellas from 1 July 2024 to 18 October 2024.

== Premise ==
The telenovela follows four women who escape from prison and take refuge in a bar looking to start a new life.

== Cast ==
=== Main ===
- Arap Bethke as Alejandro Castillo "El Abogado"
- Erika Buenfil as Martha Pineda "La Superiora"
- César Évora as Patricio Rojas "El Polícia"
- Juan Martín Jáuregui as Ismael Domínguez "El Fiscal"
- Arturo Carmona as Nicolás Arteaga
- Daniela Álvarez as Lorena Martínez "La Martillo"
- Guillermo Quintanilla as Arturo Márquez
- María Alicia Delgado as Charo Hernández
- Sachi Tamashiro as Frida Segovia
- Edsa Ramírez as Amanda Rojas
- Rocío de Santiago as Lisset Parra
- Marlene Kalb as Montserrat "Montse" Torres
- Chris Pazcal as Dario Estrada
- Paulette Hernández as Florencia Márquez
- Flor Martino as Verónica Linares
- Aldo Guerra as Erick Sotomayor
- Luz Edith Rojas as Sofía
- Gema Garoa as Carmen López "Perla"
- Edward Castillo as Vicente Márquez
- Michelle Pellicer as Gabriela Martínez
- Alex Carabias as Matías Estrada

=== Guest stars ===
- Sugey Abrego as Melania
- Carlo Guerra as Juan Pablo Correa
- Dari Romo
- Ana Patricia Rojo as Esther Suárez

== Production ==
=== Development ===
In December 2023, it was reported that Lucero Suárez would be producing a remake of 2016 Chilean telenovela Preciosas, with the working title of the telenovela being Profugas. Filming began on 26 February 2024, with Fugitivas, en busca de la libertad being the official title of the telenovela.

=== Casting ===
Scarlet Gruber was initially considered for one of the four lead roles but later dropped out. On 26 February 2024, Sachi Tamashiro, Daniela Álvarez, Rocío de Santiago and Marlene Kalb were announced in the lead roles, with the rest of the cast being announced as well.

== Episodes ==
No.	Title	Original release date	Mexico viewers (millions)
1	"Lorena es condenada"	1 July 2024 (Note: Premiered early online through Las Estrellas website on 28 June 2024.)	3.22
Lorena is excited about her first day at work and meets Ismael, with whom she begins a relationship. Ismael confesses to Lorena that he is a married man, but is currently separated because his marriage is going through a crisis; Lorena discovers that he is the husband of her boss. During the construction company's anniversary ceremony, Juan Pablo is found dead; Ismael tries to revive him, but to no avail. Alejandro fails to collect enough evidence and Lorena is found guilty of Juan Pablo's death and is sentenced to 45 years in prison. Ismael, knowing that Lorena was sentenced, doesn't want to know anything about her and refuses to support her as a lawyer.
2	"Si te vas a fugar, me voy contigo"	2 July 2024	2.88
Martha, witnessing Lorena's suffering, asks her not to let anyone hurt her because she could have a very bad time in prison. Lorena overhears a conversation with Lisset where she confirms that she is going to escape from the prison, she assures her that she can keep her secret as long as she helps her escape. Frida, seeing Lorena's nervousness, confirms that she is going to escape with Lisset and joins her plan. Florencia doesn't hesitate to surprise Ismael with details to make him forget a little of the pain he is going through because of the death of his best friend. Lorena, Lisset and Frida along with other inmates try to escape from the prison, however, a guard prevents them from escaping.
3	"¿Tiene una razón personal para capturar a Lorena?"	3 July 2024	2.87
Martha helps her jailmates escape from the prison, Lorena takes them to her home to change their clothes and asks Gabriela, her sister, to be ready to flee the country. Lisset arrives at the place where some time ago she had saved 200,000 pesos so that when she regained her freedom she could invest them, but discovers that Erick, her boyfriend, stole them. Ismael confirms to the media that Lorena Martínez is among the inmates who escaped from the prison and denies that it is a personal matter to find her whereabouts. After serving her sentence, Martha returns home, but when she is reunited with her son Darío, he doesn't hesitate to ignore his mother. Ismael discovers that Gabriela is about to meet with her sister, so he begins to follow her, and when he arrives at the park, he surprises Lorena.
4	"Voy a demostrar tu inocencia"	4 July 2024	2.90
Ismael intercepts Lorena to arrest her, she defends herself and manages to flee; however, her sister Gabriela doesn't have the same fate and is interrogated by the authorities. Lorena arrives at Alejandro's apartment to take shelter, he assures her that he will continue his investigations to prove her innocence. Florencia tries to convince Ismael to abandon the case of the escaped prisoners, but when he refuses, she demands an explanation about what happened with Lorena. Ismael confesses to Patricio and Nicolás that he had a romantic relationship with Lorena months before Juan Pablo's murder. Lorena and the other escaped prisoners arrive at a bar ready to get a job, but when they enter they find Martha who puts them in safety so that they will not be discovered by the commander and his family.
5	"¿Me engañaste con Lorena Martínez?"	5 July 2024	2.74
Martha confesses to Carmen that after Darío's father died, she distanced herself from her son for work reasons since he stayed with his grandparents. Florencia meets with Nicolás to find out if Ismael has another affair, he doesn't hesitate to reveal to her that her husband had a relationship with Lorena Martínez. Vicente asks Gabriela out, he discovers that she is Lorena Martinez's sister and learns of her strong family history. To avoid being discovered, Lorena, Frida, Lisset, Elsa and Montse change their appearance to avoid being identified by the authorities and seek Alejandro's help. Ismael apologizes to Florencia for the argument they had the night before, she takes advantage of the moment to question him if he cheated on her with Lorena.
6	"Eres maravillosa"	8 July 2024	3.01
Lorena confesses to Alejandro that Verónica had many motives to eliminate Juan Pablo, since the night of the construction company's anniversary he confronted her to get her to stay away from him. Lisset surprises Erick at the bar to demand some false documents for her and her friends as well as some cell phones, seeing his refusal, she forces him to answer after the robbery he did to her. Elsa manages to put her son in a safe place, Lorena begs her to leave before the police arrive, knowing what happened to Ramón, but she prefers to turn herself in. Frida convinces Darío to give her and her friends a chance to work at the bar. Lorena informs her friends that Elsa turned herself in to the authorities. Florencia arrives at Nicolás' apartment to unburden herself for what Ismael did to her; however, he lets himself go and kisses her.
7	"Así que te llamas Estrella y tú Carmen"	9 July 2024	2.93
After learning that Lorena and her fellow jailmates are planning to cross the border, Ismael orders an operation to find the fugitives before they put their plan into action. Frida asks Carmen to keep her mouth shut, otherwise, she is ready to reveal to Darío that his wife is actually named Perla and worked for El Turco. Gabriela invites Vicente to watch a movie at her house, he steals a kiss and tries something else, but she puts a stop to it. Alejandro gets tired of Amanda's pestering for wanting to know if he has contact with the fugitives, mainly Lorena, so he asks her to consider if it is worth continuing their relationship. Carmen changes her mind and asks Darío that it would be better not to fire the girls he hired for the bar.
8	"Nunca más me vuelvas a buscar"	10 July 2024	2.91
Matías confirms that his father's employees are the fugitives and in exchange for his silence, he gives them a list of requests that includes a video game console, Lisset is in charge of getting it and contacts Erick. After hearing that the fugitives have already crossed the border, Gabriela contacts Ismael to complain to him for not speaking the truth and now fears for her sister Lorena's life. Martha reminds Frida that her son Darío already has a partner and forbids her to approach him with other intentions, she confesses to Lorena that Carmen's real name is Perla. Lorena confirms to Alejandro that she had a relationship with Ismael, he goes mad with anger and assures her that he never wants to see her again and kicks her out of his house.
9	"¿Qué te pasa con Lorena Martínez?"	11 July 2024	3.09
Verónica and Florencia insult Gabriela for being Lorena's sister, Vicente defends her and assures them that Juan Pablo was just a hustler, Verónica slaps him for defaming her former partner. Verónica confesses to Florencia that she is beginning to have feelings for Nicolás, so she is determined to win him over. Alejandro wants to prove with the information provided by Sofía that Lorena is innocent because a woman named Rosario could be the presumed culprit of Juan Pablo's death. Lorena warns Gabriela to stay away from Vicente since his family cannot be trusted. Darío gets upset with Martha and assures her that she is the only criminal in the house, so he is sure that she is the one who stole the money.
10	"¿Será su amante?"	12 July 2024	2.33
Darío confesses to Carmen that his mother was not really in La Paz, but in prison, Martha tries to explain that she did not kill Darío's father, she simply defended herself from his attacks, but they do not believe her. Alejandro shows Lorena the image of the woman with whom Juan Pablo had contact, she discovers that it is Charo, the lady who works for the Marquez family. Lorena finds Juan Pablo's second cell phone in Verónica's apartment, but they are almost discovered by her and Nicolás. After recovering Juan Pablo's cell phone, Alejandro calls the last number he had registered and it is Florencia's cell phone.
11	"¿Quién tiene ese celular?"	15 July 2024	2.69
Frida, seeing that Carmen is trying to make her life impossible, warns her not to mess with her, otherwise she will confess to Darío her dark past, and she will look for El Turco to reveal her whereabouts. Gabriela receives a message from Lorena asking her to be careful because she found a possible clue that could lead her to Juan Pablo's murderer. Gabriela confesses to Vicente that she left the nightclub because his friends made her feel bad for not having money and riding public transportation, he apologizes for giving her a bad night. Lisset, seeing that Carmen is very close to Erick, asks him to be cautious since she was the one who planted the money that was supposedly lost at the bar. Alejandro thinks that for the moment it is better to stop the search for possible clues to Lorena's innocence, as they must be very cautious, otherwise things could get complicated.
12	"Tengo muchas ganas de tener un hijo contigo"	16 July 2024	2.50
Florencia suggests to her father that in order to get Vicente back, the best way is to win Gabriela over by making her believe that she has nothing to do with Lorena's legal situation. Upon confirming that Charo knows who Juan Pablo's mistress is, Lorena is determined to enter the Marquez family home to recover the suitcase and discover who she is covering for. Given the problems with Darío, Carmen assures Martha that the best thing to do is for her to leave the house, otherwise the situation will get worse. Arturo seeks out Vicente to assure him that he will not oppose his relationship with Gabriela and to prove that he is changing, he invites them to breakfast at the house. Ismael thinks it is time to expand the family, so he proposes to Florencia to have a child.
13	"Siento que Lorena no significó nada en tu vida"	17 July 2024	2.83
Lisset has an accident while looking for the evidence Lorena needs, so she asks Lorena to come into the house to help her. Lorena and Lisset ask Gabriela for help so they can escape from the Marquez house. Martha says goodbye to Frida. Gabriela questions Ismael about the love he claimed to feel for Lorena, he asks her not to mention her sister's name again now that they are going to live together as a family. Lisset gives Lorena a letter from Juan Pablo that she found in Charo's room, and shows her the photos she took of the picture frame in her room. Gabriela gets nervous when she learns that Vicente may discover that she has contact with Lorena, he thinks she is dating someone else.
14	"No quiero volver a verte"	18 July 2024	2.64
In order to avoid further conflict with each other, Gabriela admits to Vicente that she maintains contact with her sister. Sofía warns Alejandro about detective Amanda. Montse blackmails Carmen after discovering that she is married. Lorena is left without the support of Gabriela and Alejandro. Commander Patricio helps Martha get a job. Alejandro breaks up with detective Amanda and complains to her for meddling in his business.
15	"Te quise como a nadie en mi vida"	19 July 2024	2.58
Frida questions Montse about her friendship with Carmen, she assures her that she only takes a favorable view of her and that is why she gave her the lipstick. Ismael confesses to Lorena that at some point he thought she was playing with him and Juan Pablo, which is why he denied his support when she went to jail. Lorena confesses to Ismael that Juan Pablo had a lover and she is sure she was married, he agrees to help her, but in exchange he wants her to turn herself in to the authorities. Montse confesses to Frida that Carmen is very accessible to her since she found out she is married. Darío is upset with Lorena for not showing up for work so when he sees her arrive at the bar, he fires her.
16	"Lo mejor es que me vaya"	22 July 2024	2.76
Florencia complains to Ismael for not arriving at the dinner that her father organized and assures him that she is tired of pretending that everything is fine in their marriage. Verónica places Gabriela in a warehouse so that she can start working, Vicente realizes what they did to her and asks Florencia to relocate his girlfriend to a better place. Lorena confesses to Frida that she spent the night with Ismael, but swears that she didn't tell him anything about the other fugitives. Frida is disappointed to learn that Lorena is betraying them. Carmen, seeing that Darío defends Frida and her friends a lot, gets upset and makes it clear to him that when it comes to advice, he should ask her for it.
17	"Ya no puedo confiar en ti"	23 July 2024	2.76
Gabriela confesses to Vicente that her sister Lorena never left the country, she helped her to confuse the authorities. Frida makes a recommendation to Darío on how to attract more clients to the bar, Carmen seeing that she has a special approach warns her not to mess with her husband. Lisset arrives at the Márquez family's house with the intention of getting information from Charo; however, she notices that they are looking for female employees and applies. Darío shows Frida the documents that prove that his mother gave him the house, she recognizes that Martha is an excellent person, and when he hears her, he doesn't hesitate to kiss her.
18	"Estás fuera del caso"	24 July 2024	2.84
Florencia doesn't resist Nicolás' desire and gives herself to him, but warns him that this cannot be repeated since she is a married woman. Florencia takes advantage of Ismael's phone call to check the documents he has on the table and discovers that he has the address of the apartment where she was seeing Juan Pablo. Amanda informs Ismael that her father resigned as commander because Nicolás is not doing a good job. Ismael makes the decision to take the case of the fugitives away from Nicolás, he asks for a chance because of their friendship, but is denied.
19	"Florencia era la amante de Juan Pablo"	25 July 2024	2.43
Nicolás accepts in front of Patricio and the whole work team that he made a mistake and offers them an apology. After discovering that Ismael is beginning to investigate more details of Juan Pablo's death, Florencia confesses to Charo that she is determined to tell him the whole truth. Ismael surprises Alejandro in his apartment and asks him that if he sees Lorena to warn her to be careful, as she is in danger. Obtaining an important piece of information about her investigation, Lorena, with Lisset's help, confirms that Florencia was Juan Pablo's lover.
20	"¿De dónde sacaste que ella era amante de Juan Pablo?"	26 July 2024	2.37
Patricio asks Martha out, but she prefers to stay out of his life because she doesn't want to have any relationship with someone related to the police. Ismael tells Lorena that all the clues he gave her are true and that Juan Pablo's wife has a lot of money, she reveals that Florencia was Juan Pablo's mistress. Frida prevents Darío from discovering that Carmen's real name is Perla and that she is married to Sergio. Verónica takes advantage of the closeness she has with Ismael to confess to him that Juan Pablo has always cheated on her, and when he listens to her, he confirms Florencia's infidelity.
21	"¿Lorena está en la ciudad de México?"	29 July 2024	2.79
Florencia accepts in front of Ismael that she was unfaithful with Juan Pablo and assures him that she felt abandoned and that is why she looked for someone else's affection. Amanda believes that Alejandro spent the night with another woman and makes it clear that she is tired of his mysteries, since he has never introduced her to his family and friends. Ismael confesses to Commander Patricio that Lorena is in Mexico as she returned because she is worried about her sister; however Nicolas overhears all the information. Ismael holds a press conference to inform the fugitives that if they turn themselves in to the authorities they will not receive any punishment for having escaped; however, a journalist questions him about Lorena's whereabouts.
22	"La voy a defender hasta el final"	30 July 2024	2.73
Alejandro assures the fugitives that Ismael's reaction to the press was normal since he could not compromise himself with any statement and he is sure that someone close to him set him up. Darío confesses to Frida that when he is close to her he can't help but feel something, but he knows he can't hurt Carmen either since she is a good woman. Upon learning that Lorena is in Mexico, Verónica warns Gabriela that she will watch her every step to prove that she is also bad like her sister. Alejandro declares nationally that he doesn't recommend Lorena to turn herself in to the authorities since she was convicted of a crime she did not commit, so he is willing to prove her innocence.
23	"Ya no confío en ti"	31 July 2024	2.32
Ismael asks Arturo not to get involved in the problems he has with Florencia, Arturo warns him to think things through, otherwise he could become his own worst enemy. Carmen approaches Erick to beg him not to reveal to Darío that he saw her kissing another man, he swears he won't say anything. Vicente confesses to Florencia that Arturo is not an exemplary father, since he discovered him in a compromising situation with Victoria, his personal assistant. Florencia looks for Ismael to beg him for a chance, but the first thing he does is to question her if she had anything to do with Juan Pablo's death.
24	"Me encontré con Esther Suárez"	1 August 2024	2.56
Arturo arrives at Alejandro's apartment to demand that he retract his statements and ask for a public apology for having tarnished his name, Alejandro doesn't hesitate to warn him that he can sue him for creating false evidence against Lorena. Lorena confesses to Frida that when she boarded public transportation she was recognized by a woman, so she immediately got off and ran to hide. Esther threatens Martha with revealing to Estefanía that she was the one who leaked to the police the address of where she was hiding, so she asks her for a large sum of money for her silence. Gabriela accepts in front of Lorena that she has not been a good sister for which she asks her forgiveness, Lorena assures her that she is the most important thing in her life.
25	"Se están escondiendo en un sitio público"	2 August 2024	2.42
Arturo bursts with anger when he learns that his business is falling because of Alejandro's statement. Florencia can no longer hide her affair and confesses to her father that she slept with Juan Pablo, but was discovered by Ismael. Martha fails to stop Esther from entering the bar and discovers that the rest of the fugitives are working there. Alejandro learns that Claudio Vilchis delivered the documents that match the evidence against Lorena.
26	"Ismael y el comandante están aquí"	5 August 2024	2.58
Esther invites Montse to eat at an exclusive restaurant in the city, but when it's time to ask for the bill, she pretends that her wallet was stolen to avoid paying. Darío demands the truth from Carmen about what she did with the money she took from the business since he found out that her sister Sara was not hospitalized. Patricio takes Ismael to the bar to meet Martha, but Lorena notices his presence and fears that she and the fugitives will be discovered, Erick tries to help them. Lorena takes refuge in her room to avoid being recognized by Ismael, but Carmen threatens to fire her if she doesn't go back to work.
27	"La seguridad de todos está en tus manos"	6 August 2024	2.78
Nicolás is tired of Verónica's harassment so he reveals to her that he is interested in someone else. Verónica confesses to Florencia that she is going to find the woman who wants to take Nicolás away from her. Esther realizes that Ismael went up to the bedrooms looking for Lorena, so she confronts him and threatens to accuse him of stealing something, he tries to remember her face since she looks familiar. Lorena thanks Esther for saving her, but Esther assures her that a thank you will not be enough and asks her to think about how she will repay her for the favor. Lisset confesses to Darío that they are escaping from a man who only makes Lorena's life miserable, Esther waits for Darío to leave to threaten Lorena with denouncing her.
28	"Me encantaría volver a verte"	7 August 2024	2.98
Esther tells the fugitives the plan she has to extort money from some friends who are full of money, they accept but ask for 50 percent of the profit. Esther is in charge of revealing to Matías that Martha was in jail for 18 years, he confronts his grandmother to tell him the truth, but Darío prevents her from doing so. Montse pretends to be Cecilia and meets Arturo, who is enchanted by her beauty and asks her not to be the last time they see each other. Esther puts on the table the project that will change the beauty industry; however, Adelaida refuses to invest her money in the product because she is distrustful.
29	"Con las judas no me peleo"	8 August 2024	2.47
Montse, seeing that Adelaida and Isadora no longer want to invest, makes an offer to Esther for the same amount, they regret it and give her a check with a large sum of money. Alejandro confronts Arturo by assuring that he is the main suspect in the robbery of his apartment since the thieves happened to take Lorena's file. Florencia congratulates Gabriela for convincing Vicente to stay in town, but doesn't hesitate to find out about Lorena's relationship with Ismael. Martha confronts Esther for having revealed to her grandson that she was in jail and when she sees that the fugitives betrayed her, she kicks them out of the house.
30	"Van anular tu juicio"	9 August 2024	2.40
Esther convinces Montse to go to Spain with her, Lisset, Frida and Lorena ask her to reconsider since Esther is not going to keep any of her promises. Darío begs Martha not to leave the house as it is a good opportunity to recover their relationship as mother and son. Frida and Lisset plan to split the money so they can go on their trip, but when they open the bag, they realize that Esther swindled them. Lorena puts her plan into action and says goodbye to her friends to turn herself in to the authorities, Alejandro learns that Vilchis will not come to testify and desperately looks for Lorena.
31	"Vas a pagar por todo"	12 August 2024	2.70
Vilchis informs Ismael that Lorena was the one who hurt him because days ago she appeared to demand that he change his statement, otherwise he would regret it for the rest of his life. Lorena is heartbroken since she cannot prove her innocence and everything is complicated, Martha asks her not to lose hope. Arturo informs Florencia that she no longer has to worry about the witness who was going to testify on Lorena's behalf and asks her to gain Gabriela's trust since he doesn't believe that she has no contact with her sister. Alejandro informs Lorena what happened with Vilchis, but Amanda discovers that he has contact with her and she threatens to put her in jail.
32	"Lorena Martinez quedas detenida"	13 August 2024	2.20
Carmen begs Darío not to kick her out, he asks her to take her things since he is not interested in knowing anything about her. Amanda suggests to Ismael that he should deny to Alejandro that Lorena is a victim of the system so they can show society what kind of criminal she is. Vilchis confesses to his sister that he is sorry for the harm he is causing Lorena, his sister fears that the authorities will discover that everything he has declared is a lie. Lorena arrives at the restaurant to meet Alejandro, but Amanda recognizes her and is ready to arrest her.
33	"Vete al diablo Ismael Dominguez"	14 August 2024	2.50
Lorena manages to run to safety and avoids being arrested by Amanda, Lisset assures her that she should be careful since the authorities are after Alejandro. Lorena confesses to Frida that Ismael pretended to love her just to sleep with her and is convinced that he wants to put her in jail no matter what. Lorena calls Ismael to explain how things happened the day Juan Pablo died, he assures her that the only thing he cares about is catching her so that she pays for her crimes. Ismael asks Florencia to stay in the apartment to try to recover their marriage. Patricio assures Amanda that she is acting viscerally.
34	"Arturo Márquez tiene que estar tras las rejas"	15 August 2024	2.70
Verónica confirms to Florencia that Nicolás is cheating on her since he was seen entering his apartment with a blonde woman, Florencia wants to avoid being discovered and offers her help to find the lover. Florencia asks Nicolás to go back to Verónica because that way they will not be exposed as lovers. Arturo tries to deny the defamations published by journalist Quiroga in his article, but Florencia proposes to Alejandro to keep quiet. Patricio can no longer hide his feelings for Martha and begs her for a chance, she is surprised and asks for time.
35	"No digas algo que no quiero escuchar"	16 August 2024	2.30
Vicente denies that his father is involved in Juan Pablo's death since he always saw him as his son. Ismael tells Patricio that they searched Alejandro's house to get information about Lorena and if they find anything, he plans to denounce him for cover-up and thus Lorena will be on her own. Arturo tries to manipulate Gabriela with the idea that her sister did kill Juan Pablo and had Vilchis beaten, since he is incapable of hurting anyone. Alejandro swears to Lorena that he will not give up on proving her innocence, they both let their feelings take over and kiss.
36	"Nunca podré demostrar mi inocencia"	19 August 2024	2.50
Alejandro asks Lorena for a chance, but she turns him down as she plans to escape. Verónica sees the photographs that the detective sent her and confirms that Nicolás was unfaithful with Amanda; Florencia celebrates that her plan went perfectly. Frida begins to read Lorena's letter where she says goodbye to the fugitives forever. Alejandro decides to escape with Lorena and takes her to his grandfather's cabin, but the caretaker threatens them when he realizes that they entered without his consent.
37	"Me vuelvo a sentir feliz"	20 August 2024	2.40
Matías confesses to Frida that he accepts that she is his father's partner, but asks her to reveal that she and all her friends are fugitives from the law. Ismael questions Nicolás about the name of the reporter who leaked Vilchis' information, but he assures him that the commander and detective Rojas also had knowledge of the case and he is suspicious of them. Alejandro confesses to Lorena that he wishes that in his next life they would meet sooner so that he could spend more time by her side. Alfredo arrives at the cabin and in front of Lorena threatens to turn her in to the authorities for being a fugitive. Ismael intercepts Alejandro's phone.
38	"Nos encontraron"	21 August 2024	2.60
Alfredo doesn't hesitate to ask Lorena's forgiveness when he learns that she is an innocent woman, so he extends his help, Alejandro assures her that the best thing to do is to go somewhere else. Vicente informs Gabriela that Ismael managed to find Lorena's whereabouts, so he will deploy an operation to arrest her. Patricio confesses to Martha that when he met her he felt like he had been brought back to life, she admits that she never thought she would get her hopes up again, he doesn't hesitate to give her a kiss. Alfredo informs Alejandro that the police have blocked all the exits of the town, Lorena doesn't want to turn herself in to the authorities.
39	"Estoy harta de tus desprecios"	22 August 2024	2.60
Alfredo leaves the cabin and assures the authorities that the people they are looking for are not there, Ismael and Patricio corroborate the information. Alejandro and Lorena take refuge in the basement, but Alejandro is willing to face reality. Carmen demands Darío that she be the co-owner of the Oasis bar, since living in a common-law marriage, she is entitled to half of everything he has and if he refuses she will sue him. Gabriela gets tired of Verónica's insults and puts a stop to her, Vicente tries to calm the situation, but it is impossible. Ismael informs Alejandro that he will be taken to the prosecutor's office.
40	"Sus identificaciones"	23 August 2024	2.50
Ismael gives up the search for Lorena, Alejandro assures her that she is safe, but the only thing that worries him is the whereabouts of his uncle Alfredo. Nicolás informs Arturo that Lorena is still at large since they were unable to arrest her, he gets upset and assures him that the entire police force is useless. Nicolás overhears a conversation with Amanda and discovers that she is the one who is leaking confidential information from the prosecutor's office, so he is ready to expose her to Ismael. Alejandro and Lorena begin their trip to Guatemala; however, when they want to leave, they find themselves at a checkpoint where they are asked for their IDs.
41	"¿Qué tienes que ver con Vilchis?"	26 August 2024	2.50
Lorena presents a fake ID at the police checkpoint and after answering a series of questions she and Alejandro manage to get through to Guatemala. Florencia is grateful that Alejandro has not been arrested, otherwise he would reveal her affair with Juan Pablo and her marriage to Ismael would be over. Montse decides to get ready to go shopping for Matías' gift, but at the store she meets a wealthy man who invites her for coffee. Vicente recognizes that one of the men who took care of Vilchis in the hospital is with his father, so he questions him if he has something to do with Lorena's case.
42	"No me subestimes"	27 August 2024	2.70
Amanda informs Nicolás that her father has accepted her as part of the team that is going to arrest Soledad, he tries to hug her as a thank you, but she asks him not to confuse things. Carmen gives Darío a copy of the lawsuit she will file against him if he refuses to give her what she is owed for the bar. Alejandro knows he must return to the city so as not to raise suspicions with the authorities and swears to Lorena that he will soon return to be by her side. Frida bursts into tears when she learns that she will soon have to separate from Darío since the fugitives have raised the money to buy the plane tickets to Brazil.
43	"¿Dónde está Vilchis?"	28 August 2024	2.60
Amanda confronts Soledad and her people to get Nicolás to safety, and immediately calls for reinforcements to capture her. Patricio is upset to learn that the operation against Soledad could have ended in disgrace only because of Nicolás' outburst, Amanda tries to intervene, but her father no longer wants him in his plans. Erick invites Lisset to dinner and tells her that he has the address where her mother works, she no longer wants to look for her, but he tries to convince her to see her before her trip to Brazil. Nicolás invites Amanda to dinner as a thank you, but they are surprised by Verónica who doesn't hesitate to insult her, believing that she is her boyfriend's mistress.
44	"¿Es tu hijo?"	29 August 2024	2.80
Arturo's people threaten Alejandro with harm to his family and Gabriela if he doesn't stay away from Lorena forever. Alejandro asks Sofía to help him investigate when Vilchis left the hospital and warns her to be careful because Arturo's people could hurt her. Nicolás tries to prove to Amanda that Ismael is doing everything he can to avoid arresting Lorena and assures her that he didn't want them to stay at the meeting with Castillo for a reason.
45	"Lo mejor es que nos separemos"	30 August 2024	2.64
Martha kicks out Lisset from the house for provoking Matías to turn against her, she defends herself and assures her that her grandson has confused things. Florencia complains to Verónica for meddling in her life and warns her that if she keeps talking about things that do not concern her she will lose her friendship and her job. Lisset and Montse try to wake Frida up so she can get ready and go down to work, but she is so tired that she can't get out of bed; Darío is determined to take her to the doctor. Gabriela leaves her apartment to go to school but when she crosses the street she is run over.
46	"Urge localizar a Lorena"	2 September 2024	2.65
Alejandro informs Lorena that her friends are still working at the Oasis and confesses that he hid their location from Gabriela because she must stay out of the way due to her closeness to the Marquez family. Frida is examined by the doctor and discovers that she has a couple of red spots on her abdomen, so he sends her for a series of tests to rule out any danger. Vicente receives the news that Gabriela has fallen into a coma due to the severe blow to her head. Montse finds out that Lorena's sister is in danger. Erick urges Alejandro to locate Lorena since Gabriela was run over and her life is in danger, Alejandro remembers the threat he received.
47	"¿Cuánto tiempo te queda de vida?"	3 September 2024	2.66
Alejandro informs Lorena that Gabriela was run over and is now in a coma, Lorena is determined to return, but he prevents her and assures her that he will let her know everything that happens. In view of her sister's difficult situation, Lorena decides to return to Mexico. Alejandro asks Sofía to help him investigate the man who threatened him. Florencia asks her father to confirm that he had nothing to do with Gabriela's accident, Arturo denies it and assures her that it hurts him that she distrusts him. Carmen surprises Frida by revealing that she has found out that she has little time left to live.
48	"Hermanita ya estoy aquí"	4 September 2024	2.53
Frida confesses to a cab driver that she has a disease that is killing her and now that she has found love in a wonderful man, she doesn't know how long she has left to live. Lorena asks Alejandro to help her get into the hospital to see her sister, he warns her that it may be too risky since the Márquez have not left the building. Ismael confesses to Nicolás that his marriage to Florencia is over for good, Nicolás calls Florencia to invite her to dinner at his house to celebrate the news. Alejandro gets Lorena a nurse's uniform and helps her get into the hospital so she can be reunited with Gabriela.
49	"Nunca vas a poder contra nosotros"	5 September 2024	N/A
Nicolás proposes to Amanda to accuse Ismael of not doing his job well, she defends him and assures Nicolás that Ismael is doing things as he should. Alejandro puts together an entire plan to find the man who ran over Gabriela, but to find him, Arturo must first fall. Martha tells Frida that she ran into Carmen and that she did not miss the opportunity to speak badly about her. Frida confesses that she met Carmen years ago and that her name is actually Perla and she is married. Alejandro arrives on time for his appointment to meet Arturo's accomplice. He admits that he set a trap for him, but when he tries to hit him, Amanda stops him.
50	"¿Sabías que Yulissa se escapó de la cárcel?"	6 September 2024	2.53
Aldo informs Arturo that Castillo was arrested, so now he needs his help to regain his freedom. Ismael complains to Alejandro for wanting to act against Aldo, Alejandro assures him that Vilchis escaped out of fear and it was he who ran over Gabriela on the orders of Arturo Márquez. Lisset tells Lorena that Arturo keeps money, a hard drive and documents in his safe, she is sure that among his belongings there is something that proves that he is connected to Juan Pablo's death. Darío notices that Matías left a letter for Lisset, he decides to read it and discovers that she escaped from prison.
51	"Voy a llamar a la policía"	9 September 2024	2.59
Frida confirms to Darío that she is also a fugitive, he wants nothing to do with her and kicks her out of the house. Martha takes some food to Patricio at the police station, he sees her good gesture and kisses her; however, they are seen by Amanda. Lisset proposes to the fugitives to escape from Darío's house because they could go to prison again and if he denounces them to the police. Vicente finds Florencia kissing Nicolás, he confronts them and assures them that they are scum for deceiving Ismael.
52	"No las voy a denunciar"	10 September 2024	2.51
Ismael tells Amanda how he met Lorena and shares that he thought she was a good person until she killed his best friend. Lorena, Lisset and Montse apologize to Darío for hiding the fact that they escaped from prison and thank him for all the support he gave them to work at the Oasis. Matías suggests to Martha that she talk to Commander Patricio and reveal the whole truth about the fugitives, but not to arrest them, but to help them stay in hiding. Darío informs Lorena, Lisset, Frida and Montse that he will not denounce them, but they have two days to leave his house.
53	"Reportaron a una prófuga en la clínica 34"	11 September 2024	2.51
Alejandro confronts Attorney Castro when he discovers his friendship with Juan Pablo as well as with the Márquez family. Vicente reveals to his father that Florencia is having an affair with Nicolás, Arturo opposes and forbids her from continuing her relationship with Ismael's best friend. Frida faints at Martha's house and when she sees that her life is in danger Martha takes her immediately to the hospital. Nicolás learns that Arturo already knows about his relationship with Florencia. Lorena and Lisset are reassured to know that Frida is stable, while Ismael receives a call alerting him that one of the 14 fugitives is hospitalized.
54	"Tu bebita ya va a nacer"	12 September 2024	2.60
Frida doesn't want Martha to hear her diagnosis and asks her to leave her alone with the doctor, who informs her that if she doesn't undergo proper treatment, she will have little time left to live. Natalia realizes that the police are at the hospital and noticing Frida's presence, alerts her and both decide to escape with Martha's help. Ismael and Amanda deploy an operation to arrest Natalia. Martha asks Natalia where she is living, she tells her that she is living in an abandoned house, but in two weeks her baby is expected to be born. Lisset worries about what Darío will say when he sees Natalia in the house. Martha talks to Darío to convince him to let Natalia stay since she is about to become a mother; however, she begins to feel contractions and Martha assures her that her baby is about to be born.
55	"Los Márquez son malos"	13 September 2024	2.45
Verónica insults Amanda when she sees her with Ismael and makes a huge scandal in the restaurant where minutes later they are asked to leave. Sofía assures Alejandro that Florencia is responsible for Juan Pablo's death and that is why Arturo avoided the scandal that his daughter was unfaithful to Ismael. Martha, with the help of the fugitives, manages to get Natalia to give birth to a baby girl. Darío accepts that Frida and her friends stay at home until she recovers. Lorena, knowing that Gabriela is in better health, asks her not to trust the Márquez family because they are not good people, Vicente listens to her and defends himself.
56	"¡Estás embarazada!"	16 September 2024	2.36
Florencia asks her father to contact Attorney Castro to handle her divorce, but he refuses because he doesn't want Ismael to see any kind of work relationship. Florencia learns that she is pregnant, the doctor asks her to return in two weeks with her husband so they can both hear the baby's heartbeat. Vicente seeks Lucre to help her overcome her addictions and recover her son Teo, but she prefers to stay away so as not to continue hurting him. Lisset places a camera in Arturo's office and Sofía gets the combination to open his hard drive and find out what is hidden on it.
57	"Lorena Martínez"	17 September 2024	2.68
Ismael proposes to Martha to collaborate with him so that she can help him find the fugitives, she refuses because she does not want to have any relationship with the police. Sofía takes advantage of the fact that there is no one at the Márquez's house and opens Arturo's safe, she asks Lisset to take pictures of all the documents, while she takes care of copying the information from the hard drive. Charo sees Alejandro and insults him for being Lorena's lawyer, he confronts her and suspects that she may also be responsible for Juan's death. Florencia sees in the distance a woman very similar to Lorena, so she decides to get out of the car to confirm her suspicions, but when she calls the woman by that name, she discovers that she is Lorena.
58	"Estamos perdidos"	18 September 2024	2.58
Montse reveals to Darío that Carmen is a married woman and her real name is Perla, besides working in a bar as a dancer, she always stole from him, that is why money was missing in the Oasis cash box. Alejandro finds a complaint filed by Juan Pablo against Vicente Márquez for damages to private property, Lorena is sure that Arturo's son is the murderer so she wants to alert her sister of the danger she runs being with him. Florencia informs Arturo that she ran into Lorena, who assured her that she has evidence against her, so Florencia asks her father to do something, because if the police discover the truth, they are lost. Ismael is determined to end any relationship with Florencia so he arrives at her office to deliver the divorce complaint. Nicolás blackmails Amanda with backing her as long as she does everything he asks of her.
59	"Tienes que alejarte de Vicente, estás en peligro"	19 September 2024	2.68
Amanda confesses to Ismael that Nicolás plans to take the fugitives' case away from her, and also reveals that she was the one who leaked Vilchis' information to the press. Upon learning of Amanda's betrayal, Ismael asks her to take all her things and leave the prosecutor's office, but first, she confesses that Arturo Márquez is supporting prosecutor Arteaga. Lorena contacts Gabriela to inform her that it was Vicente who killed Juan Pablo, but Gabriela refuses to believe the accusation. Florencia visits her psychologist to talk about what has happened in her life and confesses that she doesn't know whether to continue with her pregnancy or terminate it.
60	"¡Policía, no te muevas!"	20 September 2024	2.49
Lorena bursts into tears when she learns that Gabriela wants nothing to do with her. After a romantic dinner, Patricio asks Martha to stay with him so that she can tell him all about her life, she assures him that she might bore him, but he convinces her with a kiss. Amanda is not willing to play along with Nicolás, so she confronts him and assures him that she is not afraid that he will reveal everything she did. Natalia arrives at the restaurant where Daniel works and tells him the news that he became a father, he excitedly asks to meet his daughter, but they are discovered by Amanda.
61	"Estaremos los tres como una familia"	23 September 2024	2.72
Vicente asks his father if anyone in the family is involved in Juan Pablo's death. After learning that Natalia was arrested, Montse proposes to Martha to keep Elenita since Natalia did not want the baby to grow up in jail, Darío opposes since they could be accused of kidnapping. Amanda questions Natalia about the whereabouts of her daughter, she assures her that some friends have her, but refuses to reveal more details for fear that her daughter will grow up in jail and the fugitives will be discovered. Daniel hopes that Natalia's sentence will be reduced, but she assures him that it will be increased for having escaped.
62	"¿Tú hija está aquí?"	24 September 2024	2.41
Darío bursts into tears in front of Frida when he confesses that he felt very helpless for not defending Natalia, and he is grateful that she did not accompany her because it would have been a disgrace. Ismael informs Patricio and Amanda of Nicolás' plans against him, so he asks them to make him believe that he is in control and that his presence at the office is very useful. Vicente opens his heart to Gabriela and confesses that his mother was a dominant woman who caused him many problems, but their relationship broke up when he organized a party at her house and one of his guests stole all of his mother's jewelry. Martha complies with Natalia's request and gives Daniel her daughter Elenita, but Patricio arrives home and hears a baby crying.
63	"¡Vamos a ser papás!"	25 September 2024	2.57
Verónica accompanies Florencia to her doctor's appointment for an ultrasound so that she can hear her baby's heart for the first time. Daniel arrives at the prison so that Natalia can be reunited with Elenita since he cannot keep the baby until a judge gives him custody. Montse gets upset with her friends for wanting to force her to stay home and not meet with her friend. Florencia assures Ismael that she does not intend to sign the divorce decree since she is expecting his child.
64	"Necesito que seas honesto"	26 September 2024	2.40
Ismael takes Florencia home after learning that she is expecting his child, but Arturo, upon seeing him, kicks him out after witnessing how he despises his daughter. Gabriela tells Arturo that Vicente was arrested after getting into a fight in a bar and leaving the bartender seriously injured, she immediately remembers her sister's words that he is a violent man. Ismael confesses to Amanda that he is considering the idea of getting back together with Florencia since he doesn't agree with the education his son could receive if he grows up in the Márquez house. Castro becomes Vicente's lawyer and asks him to speak the truth to think about his defense since it is not the first time he gets into trouble.
65	"Te agradezco una vez más tu apoyo"	27 September 2024	2.67
Vicente gets upset with Gabriela for having told his father that he was under arrest, she assures him that if the lawyer can't fix his problem, jail awaits him. Castro presents the judge with proof that Vicente couldn't have attacked the bartender because he had surgery on his right hand, which prevents him from having the strength to break a bottle on another person. Lorena learns that a week before Juan Pablo's death, Vicente had surgery on his right hand, so he is innocent because his condition prevented him from having the strength to become a murderer. Arturo thanks Castro for all his support in the problems he has had and also doesn't forget that with his help he obtained the land in Playa Dorada that belonged to Juan Pablo's father.
66	"Perdóname por no haber creído en ti"	30 September 2024	2.95
After hearing Arturo's confession about the land in Playa Dorada, Charo immediately remembers the day Juan Pablo was worried and assured her that when he had news he would share it with her. Martha confirms that the police are after Frida, Lisset and Montse, because of the testimony of a woman who saw them the day Paola Farfán was arrested, the agents suspect that the three of them are together. Ismael realizes that Alejandro received a message from Lorena and pretends to be him to meet her in a park to set her up. Ismael apologizes to Lorena and assures her that he is convinced that she is innocent because Arturo Márquez is behind many shady things.
67	"No voy a permitir que me arrebates a mi hijo"	1 October 2024	2.69
Arturo believes that Ismael is covering for a murderer and begins to look for Lorena throughout the apartment, Alejandro finds her, but manages to get her to safety. Ismael announces to Nicolás that Florencia is seven weeks pregnant, Nicolás asks him to make sure it is really his child since she may have been involved with another man. Alejandro is upset with Lorena for agreeing to go to Ismael's apartment knowing that he is still in love with her, Lorena assures him that she went only because he is willing to help her put Arturo Márquez in jail. Nicolás is sure that the child Florencia is expecting is his, so he is willing to give her his surname, she reiterates that it is Ismael's.
68	"¡Fue detenida Frida Segovia!"	2 October 2024	2.79
Martha, upon learning that Frida has little time left to live, begs her to fight for her life and recommends an excellent doctor. Arturo remembers Guillermo and assures that he took over his partner's business after he lost interest in it, Charo mentions that soon after her boss bought the land in Playa Dorada. Martha arrives at Patricio's house and bursts into tears when she reveals that a very dear friend of hers does not have long to live. After giving her statement for the altercation she had in the market, Frida is recognized by the authorities as one of the fugitives from the Santiago prison.
69	"¡No vuelva a buscarme!"	3 October 2024	2.84
Lorena consoles Darío when he learns that Frida was arrested after an altercation in the market, she tries to ask Alejandro for help. Martha intercepts Patricio's car to implore him to release Frida since she is the friend who has little time left to live and doesn't want her last moments to be spent in jail. Martha returns to the Oasis with Frida and reveals to her family that she took advantage of Patricio's love for her. Patricio arrives at the police station without Frida and wounded. Martha contacts Patricio to thank him for what he did for Frida and for her, he asks her not to look for him again.
70	"¡Te odiaba profundamente!"	4 October 2024	2.82
Lorena, Montse, Frida and Lisset take advantage of the fact that they have finished working at the Oasis to escape, Martha discovers their plan and prevents them from putting themselves at risk with the police. Montse makes Facundo believe that her father is still in delicate condition and given the situation the family is going through, the best thing to do is to break up since she will return to live with them. Eréndira surprises Lisset when she arrives at the Oasis and warns her that she needs someone like her for one of her jobs. Verónica asks everyone present to dedicate a few words to Juan Pablo, but when it is Arturo Márquez's turn, she takes the floor and reveals the enmity that existed between the two of them.
71	"Eso nos confirma que fue Arturo Márquez"	7 October 2024	2.73
Ismael proposes to Florencia to move to a bigger house now that the baby is born, but he assures her that everyone will have their own bedroom since he does not want any relationship with her. Charo seeks Alejandro to help her understand some documents from Playa Dorada since she heard Mr. Castro tell Arturo Márquez that he had a hard time making the sale of the land look legal, and she is sure that Lorena is innocent. Alejandro assures Charo that Arturo may be the main suspect in Juan Pablo's death, but she denies it since he loved him like a son; however, she suspects of Castro. Lorena corroborates that Castro was not invited to Arturo's event and Alejandro confirms that it was Arturo killed Juan Pablo.
72	"Hoy no la cuentas"	8 October 2024	3.00
Lisset rejects the money Eréndira offers her for the work she did and asks her not to appear in their lives again, Lisset returns to the Oasis and tells the fugitives that they will no longer be bothered. Eréndira takes Matías hostage to force Martha to denounce La Cirujano and Aidé, but Martha refuses to be part of this revenge. Ismael accepts in front of Alejandro that their relationship will only be to help prove Lorena's innocence, during the conversation Ismael learns that Arturo swindled Juan Pablo's father. Amanda arrives at the bar where La Cirujano and Aidé are with the intention of arresting them, but they recognize her and immediately subdue her.
73	"Está metida en la boca del lobo"	9 October 2024	2.78
Amanda puts herself at risk to stop La Cirujano and Aidé, Patricio suspects that something is not right with his daughter and arrives at the bar to save her. Florencia gives Nicolás the results of the paternity test and confirms that the child she is expecting is Ismael's and not his. Nicolás assures Ismael that he should concentrate on catching Lorena Martínez because with that capture he will gain the respect of the Márquez family and unveils in front of the team his affair with Lorena. Charo contacts Alejandro to find out how the investigation of the documents she gave him is going, he assures her that Arturo most likely killed Juan Pablo to avoid going to jail for the land in Playa Dorada.
74	"¡Reconozca que eliminó a Juan Pablo!"	10 October 2024	N/A
Charo leaves a farewell letter to Arturo in which she assures him that she cannot forgive him for the harm he did to Juan Pablo and informs him that the documents of Playa Dorada are already in the possession of Mr. Castillo. Ismael and Alejandro meet with Juan Pablo's psychoanalyst and she reveals that Arturo swindled her client's father, so they want to find more evidence to put Arturo in jail. Martha arrives at Facundo's house ready to convince Montse that it is not her place, but Montse refuses and asks that she let her live her life as she has become the lady of the house. Alejandro realizes that Arturo is afraid that it will be confirmed that he murdered Juan Pablo after it was discovered that he swindled his father, Castillo asks him to recognize his crime.
75	"La recompensa convierte la situación en una cacería"	11 October 2024	2.92
Alejandro refuses to give Arturo the documents of Playa Dorada, Arturo assaults him and assures him that he is not a murderer since he loved Juan Pablo as a son and reiterates that the real culprit is Lorena. Arturo informs nationwide that he is being threatened by Lorena Martínez and asks all citizens to look for the fugitive and whoever provides information for her capture will be given three million pesos. After learning that Arturo is offering money for Lorena's capture, Ismael decides to send a press release to inform that the prosecutor's office disagrees with the actions taken by Arturo. Gabriela complains to Arturo for risking Lorena's life because for the amount offered people are capable of doing anything, Arturo is exalted and assures her that this is the least she deserves because he will not allow any more threats.
76	"La vi en un bar llamado Oasis"	14 October 2024	2.80
Ismael sends a message to Arturo to complain to him for having appeared on the newscast to demerit the work being done at the station. Ismael insists on knowing where Lorena is to protect her, but Alejandro refuses to give him the address as it would put her at risk, Ismael insists that Alejandro ask Lorena if she wants to turn herself in to the authorities. Eréndira surprises Arturo to assure him that she is willing to hand Lorena Martínez over to him, but in exchange they must make a deal between the two of them without the police intervening and the money must be in cash. Patricio begins to read the information about the supposed whereabouts of Lorena Martínez, but in one of the calls he is assured that the most wanted fugitive is in a bar where the waitresses wear colorful wigs.
77	"¡Nos descubrieron!"	15 October 2024	3.01
Arturo contacts Eréndira to agree on how she will hand over Lorena, but first, she asks for half of the reward in 500 bills. Arturo receives a call that makes Montse suspicious, so she chases him and discovers that someone will hand over Lorena and he will deliver the rest of the money in exchange. Patricio arrives at the Oasis and finds Lorena, but when he is about to stop her, Eréndira surprises them and threatens to hurt them and is ready to take Lorena. Lorena, Lisset and Frida take advantage of Eréndira's distraction to escape, so they ask Alejandro for shelter. Martha and Alejandro are arrested, but Eréndira is shot and killed by La Piraña.
78	"¡Soy Montserrat Torres y vengo a entregarme!"	16 October 2024	3.10
Montse returns to her friends and apologizes for leaving and confesses that Facundo would never forgive her for being a fugitive. Frida reveals to Lorena, Montse and Lisset that she has an incurable disease that is draining her life, so she asks them to treat her normally. Martha regrets that the situation has gotten out of hand for having let the fugitives into her house, Patricio asks her to keep her explanations to herself and now she will have to face a charge with the justice system. Montse turns herself in to the authorities with Alejandro's help so that Martha and Darío can be released, assuring Ismael that she had threatened them with harming Matías.
79	"¡Lorena no vengas!"	17 October 2024	2.88
Nicolás discovers that the child Florencia is expecting is his and asks for a DNA test, Verónica finds out and doesn't hesitate to reveal the news to Ismael. Martha reveals to Darío that Frida is terminally ill and that her life is coming to an end. When he learns the terrible news, Darío decides to look for her and swears that he is willing to accompany her until her last breath. Lorena receives a call from Gabriela, but in reality it is Arturo who threatens to harm her sister if she refuses to go to the apartment. Knowing that Lorena is in danger, Lisset takes Darío's car to chase Arturo and takes advantage of the fact that he stopped at a traffic light to hit him and cause an accident.
80	"¡Soy muy feliz!"	18 October 2024	3.11
Lisset asks Arturo to keep silent otherwise she is ready to reveal that he had two women deprived of their freedom in his car, she is arrested when she confirms that she is a fugitive from the Santiago prison. Florencia confirms that she was the one who killed Juan Pablo because she found him strangling her father and to separate them, she took a hammer and hit his head, Vicente denounces his sister. Ismael confronts Nicolás when he sees that he doesn't want to make valid the deal he offered to the fugitives and assures him that it cannot be modified since there is a verdict involved and explains that now he will be Lorena's defense. Lorena manages to get out of prison and with Alejandro's help she fulfills her dream of becoming a pharmaceutical chemist, Lisset and Montse each start the business they had dreamed of and Frida becomes a mother, but she dies from her illness.

== Reception ==
=== Ratings ===
Viewership and ratings per season of Fugitivas, en busca de la libertad
Season	Timeslot (CT)	Episodes	First aired		Last aired		Avg. viewers (millions)
Season	Timeslot (CT)	Episodes	Date	Viewers (millions)	Date	Viewers (millions)	Avg. viewers (millions)
1	Mon–Fri 8:30 p.m.	78	1 July 2024	3.22	18 October 2024	3.11	2.67

=== Awards and nominations ===
Year	Award	Category	Nominated	Result	Ref
2025	Produ Awards	Best Contemporary Telenovela	Fugitivas	Pending	
