= Corona de lágrimas (2012 TV series) season 2 =

Corona de lágrimas
- Season 2
- Starring: Victoria Ruffo; Maribel Guardia; Ernesto Laguardia; África Zavala; Mané de la Parra; José María Torre; Alejandro Nones
- No. of episodes: 110

Release
- Original network: Las Estrellas
- Original release: 29 August 2022 – 27 January 2023

The second season of the Mexican telenovela Corona de lágrimas takes place 10 years after the events of the first season, that aired in 2012. The season is produced by José Alberto Castro for TelevisaUnivision.

The season was announced on 4 August 2021, and stars Victoria Ruffo, José María Torre, Mané de la Parra and Alejandro Nones.

The season premiered on 29 August 2022 and ended on 27 January 2023.

== Plot ==
Ten years after the imprisonment of Rómulo Ancira (Ernesto Laguardia) for his crimes, Refugio (Victoria Ruffo) and her sons: Patricio, Edmundo and Ignacio, have been coping with life and the consequences of their good and bad decisions. After Olga (Geraldine Bazán) leaves for Spain, she hands over to Patricio (Alejandro Nones) the guardianship of Esperanza (Lara Campos), their daughter. Refugio has managed to rebuild her life next to Julian Corona, with whom she has a happy marriage. They have established their home in Coyoacán and share it with Patricio and his daughter, whom is affectionately nicknamed "Petita", since her father has to travel frequently on business. As the years have passed, Petita has had the desire to meet her mother, whom she never saw again after her departure.

Edmundo (José María Torre) lives with his wife Lucero (África Zavala. Due to his criminal record, Edmundo has not been able to get a stable job. Ignacio (Mané de la Parra) traveled to Italy with Chelito, his girlfriend, but little by little her new profession and Ignacio's studies separated them. This led Ignacio to return to Mexico. The love and solidarity of the Chavero family will unite them in a single effort and objective when adversity confronts them again, embodied in the vileness of Rómulo Ancira, who threatens to destroy the happiness of Refugio and her family.

== Cast ==
- Victoria Ruffo as Refugio Chavero
- Maribel Guardia as Julieta Vázquez
- Ernesto Laguardia as Rómulo Ancira
- África Zavala as Lucero Vázquez
- Mané de la Parra as Ignacio Chavero
- José María Torre as Edmundo Chavero
- Alejandro Nones as Patricio Chavero
- René Strickler as Lázaro Huesca
- Lola Merino as Mercedes Cervantes
- Sharis Cid as Diana
- Geraldine Bazán as Olga Ancira
- Ana Belena as Fernanda Varela
- Raquel Garza as Martina Durán
- Arturo Carmona as Apolinar Pantoja
- Lisardo as Dr. Rogelio Cáceres
- Amairani as Erika Córdero
- Daniela Álvarez as Eréndira
- Ulises de la Torre as Agustín Galindo
- Sebastián Poza as Renato
- Claudia Zepeda as Rebeca
- Paulette Hernández as Roxana
- Vicente Torres as Silvestre
- Ricardo Mendoza as Fidel
- Pisano as Germán Morales
- Carlos Velasco as Iñigo
- Martha Julia as Flor Escutia
- Humberto Elizondo as Ulloa
- Moisés Arizmendi as Bátiz
- María Clara Zurita as Guillermina
- Lara Campos as Esperanza "Petita" Chavero
- Roxana Castellanos as Leonarda

=== Guest stars ===
- Pedro Moreno as Judge Julián Corona

== Production ==
=== Development ===
In May 2017, it was reported by People en Español that José Alberto Castro was planning on making a sequel series of Corona de lágrimas titled Los Chavero. In August 2021, Castro confirmed that the second season would begin filming in December 2021. In October 2021, the second season was presented at Televisa's upfront for 2022. Filming began on 6 December 2021.

=== Casting ===
On 27 October 2021, Adriana Louvier confirmed that she would not be returning for the second season due to scheduling conflicts, being replaced by Geraldine Bazán in the role of Olga Ancira. On 6 December 2021, an extensive list of new and returning cast members was published by El sol de México.

== Episodes ==
No. overall	No. in season	Title	Original release date	Mexico viewers (millions)
113	1	"Hay que estar preparado para lo peor"	29 August 2022 (Note: Premiered early online through Las Estrellas website on 26 August 2022.)	2.3
The Chavero's celebrate Mother's Day with Refugio. Julián receives a mysterious call and leaves in search of his children. Mercedes asks Olga to look for Petita and take her to her side before she dies, but Olga opposes the reunion with her daughter. Refugio is worried about Julián's disappearance and calls Diana to ask for her help. Edmundo avoids entering his mother's house because of the problems with Julián. Rómulo summons Agustín and Martín to plan his release from jail, but demands loyalty. Refugio is ready to travel to Ensenada to find out what happened with Julián. Petita defends her mother from defamations by her classmates. Agustín wants to know more about Rómulo's plans. Refugio arrives in Ensenada, but still does not know more about Julián.
114	2	"¡No, mi marido no!"	30 August 2022	2.7
Petita is taken to the principal's office for the argument with her classmates. Lázaro informs Refugio that Julián suffered a heart attack and died. Nacho informs the family that Julián died. Lázaro and Diana pressure Refugio with Julián's inheritance so they threaten to take possession of the property, regardless of Refugio's homelessness. Julieta is worried about Refugio being alone is Ensenada. Judge Úlloa visits Rómulo to help him prepare for his release from prison.
115	3	"Me siento vacía"	31 August 2022	2.3
Nacho asks Mundo to reconsider his mistakes and apologize to their mother for what happened with Julián years before. Refugio receives news of Julián's death that raises some doubts. Edmundo is fired from his job because of his criminal record. Rómulo seeks Agustín's help to ask him to investigate everything about the Chaveros because he plans to take revenge. Olga contacts Patricio to ask for Petita. Refugio arrives home with Julián's ashes to give him a family farewell. At the funeral, Mundo regrets his attitude towards Julián and apologizes to both him and Refugio.
116	4	"Tengo que averiguarlo"	1 September 2022	2.4
Edmundo remembers what happened to the son he was expecting with Lucero. Diana informs her children that their father died; Rebeca suffers a crisis and Lázaro helps her, but with bad intentions. Rebeca remembers the conversation with her father in which she informed him of Lázaro's treatment. Renato calls Refugio to talk about his father's death and she invites him to her house to attend Julián's mass. Fernanda asks Patricio to look for Olga for the sake of Petita. Diana asks Renato not to have any contact with Refugio. Nacho receives a message from Chelito, his ex-girlfriend, expressing her condolences for the death of Julián and remembers their breakup.
117	5	"Mi mamá no me quiere"	2 September 2022	2.2
Flor, Rómulo's former lover, visits him in jail. After a phone call with Lázaro, Refugio has doubts about her husband's death. To appease the pain of the loss of his son, Edmundo goes back to drinking and gambling. Lucero fears that she will become pregnant again and have another miscarriage. Olga calls Patricio to resume their conversation, Petita listens and takes the phone away but Olga does not want to hear from her. Lucero discovers that Edmundo gambled again. During the case review hearing, Rómulo is granted a review of his trial; released until a new sentence is deliberated.
118	6	"Cobrar todas lo que me deben"	5 September 2022	2.5
Patricio goes to Petita's school principal to complain about how the reprisals were only against his daughter. Rebeca tricks Diana into signing travel permits so that she and Renato can attend Julián's funeral. As Rómulo is released from jail, he is attacked but is unharmed. By accident, Agustín meets Nacho and begins to follow him, obeying Rómulo's orders.
119	7	"La confianza es como el cristal"	6 September 2022	2.3
Upon learning of the twins' plans to travel to the city, Lázaro agrees to a family event in order to prevent it. The doctor tries to convince Olga to please her mother so that she will have a purpose to fight for in life. Determined to go back to work, Refugio looks for her old job, but finds that the building was demolished. During Julián's funeral, Refugio is surprised with the arrival of Rebeca and Renato.
120	8	"Van por la casa"	7 September 2022	2.7
Rómulo plans a trip to Madrid to see the state of his properties and to find the whereabouts of his granddaughter, Esperanza. Iñigo calls Patricio to explain the delicate situation his mother-in-law is in as well as his desire to see Petita again. Nacho brings Renato up to date with Lázaro's intentions to recover the house, the twins do not wish to take Refugio out of her house. The doctor gives Edmundo the news that Lucero is pregnant.
121	9	"El hombre que necesitas"	8 September 2022	2.2
The judge arrives at the apartment to complain to Rómulo about his intentions to travel to Madrid when he is forbidden to leave the country until he is acquitted. Rebeca explains to Refugio her fear of returning home and continuing to put up with Lázaro's comments. Mercedes calls Patricio to allow her to see her granddaughter, Petita, one last time. Agustín shares with the judge his concern that Rómulo's trial will drag on, as he does not want to continue to be mistreated by anyone.
122	10	"Nada permanece oculto para siempre"	9 September 2022	2.0
Mercedes complains to Olga about the negligence with which she avoids talking to Petita. Refugio discusses with Patricio his concerns about Rebeca's well-being. Rebeca fears sharing a secret. Patricio overhears how Petita wishes that Fernanda would disappear.
123	11	"No quiero causar más desgracias"	12 September 2022	2.4
Patricio complains to Petita for wishing harm to Fernanda and Refugio defends her. Polo must travel back to Monterrey, as he discovers that his partners are involved in illicit business. Refugio questions Rebeca about the letter she found in her room in Ensenada. Nacho offers to take Petita to school and meets her teacher, Eréndira.
124	12	"Refugio es mejor mamá que tú"	13 September 2022	2.3
Polo tells Julieta that her suspicions were true and that they have lost everything they had in the scam. Mercedes calls Erika to ask for support with Olga, as she fears how the reunion with Petita will go. Rebeca and Renato return home, but are not well received by their mother. Having located Patricio, Rómulo instructs Agustín to follow him and Refugio to begin his revenge. Mercedes manages to convince Olga to do everything to win back Petita's love. Diana decides to send Rebeca to a boarding school and Rebeca accepts it as long as she does not live with Lázaro. Lucero and Refugio find Agustín taking pictures of them, so they confront him.
125	13	"Mejor es tener cuidado"	14 September 2022	2.2
Agustín's identity is revealed after Refugio, Julieta and Lucero manage to recognize him. Diana tries to apologize to Lázaro for what happened with her children, he warns Diana that if he should lose the election, he will no longer need to be married to her. Refugio tells Patricio that Agustín is close to the family and Patricio prefers to keep an eye out in case Rómulo plans something against them. Martina plans to take a vacation away from the shop and asks Nacho for his support in taking care of the business. Patricio organizes a family dinner where he proposes marriage to Fernanda.
126	14	"Yo solo tengo una mamá"	15 September 2022	1.8
Petita refuses to congratulate her father and Fernanda on their engagement. Rómulo plans to use Petita to hurt Olga and Patricio. Refugio manages to convince Petita to apologize to Fernanda. Petita wants to meet Rómulo. Patricio informs Mundo and Nacho that Agustín has been following their mother. Petita tells her grandmother that she does not want to go see her mother in Spain. Mundo interrogates Lucero and Julieta for not warning that Agustín was following them, Lucero begins to feel a problem with her pregnancy.
127	15	"Vas a criar un nuevo Patricio"	16 September 2022	2.0
Rómulo asks Flor to return the guarded documents in order to recover his power. Julieta tells Refugio that Lucero's baby was at risk thanks to Mundo's anger problems. Rómulo's lawyer wants to know his plans. Rómulo stumbles upon Refugio's house and manages to see Petita, but is almost seen by Nacho. Patricio visits the prison to check on Rómulo's condition and discovers that he is not in jail.
128	16	"La cuerda siempre se revienta"	19 September 2022	2.3
Agustín warns Rómulo about his visit to Refugio's house, asks him for money in exchange for his silence. Mercedes asks Refugio not to travel to Spain with Petita and let Olga look for her daughter. Patricio wants to find out everything that happened with Julián to see what caused him to die. Julieta warns Lucero that Mundo is not ready to become a father. Dr. Caceres tells Mercedes that her cancer is responding to treatment better than expected. Refugio warns Patricio of Lázaro's power in Ensenada. Eréndida receives a warning for defending Petita. Rómulo decides to pay Refugio a visit.
129	17	"Fue como ver al demonio"	20 September 2022	2.3
Refugio faints after seeing Rómulo in front of her. Julieta asks Mundo not to worry Lucero anymore. Dr. Cáceres informs Mercedes that the latest medical results indicate that she may only need a bone marrow transplant to be cured of her cancer. Nacho tries to control Petita because of the problems that are happening in her life. Fernanda asks Refugio for help to improve her relationship with Petita. Nacho tells Patricio that his mother saw Rómulo and lost consciousness. Faced with Julieta's constant complaints about Mundo, Lucero asks her to respect him.
130	18	"Soy lo peor que te pude haber pasado"	21 September 2022	2.0
Rebeca ends up disappointed in her mother for thinking that Lázaro is the future of their family. Mercedes talks to Refugio about Olga's visit to Mexico. Diana warns her children that if Lázaro divorces her, it will be their fault. Leonarda agrees to teach Lucero how social media sales work. Mundo confronts Julieta for making it seem like he is not good enough for her daughter. Refugio tries to convince Patricio to take Petita to the meeting with her mother. Nacho's family encourages him to go on a date with Eréndira. The judge warns Rómulo how important it is that Agustín be on his side at the time of the trial.
131	19	"Ya estoy en México"	22 September 2022	2.1
After selling some of his belongings, Nacho visits Lucero to support her in starting her business. During the interrogation rehearsal, Agustín mentions the link between Rómulo and Patricio, Rómulo reacts violently. Mundo takes advantage of Lucero being asleep to take some of the money she has. Mundo spends the night with Roxana. Patricio arrives at the notary's office and receives the news that in an old will of Julián, his mother was heir.
132	20	"La mala de esta historia"	23 September 2022	1.8
Rómulo manages to convince Manuel to let him leave the house and look for the money he needs, but he is seen again by Refugio. Refugio arrives at Olga's house manages to change her attitude. Patricio is worried about the stability of his family with Olga's arrival. Lucero begins to suspect that something is going on with Mundo. Petita doubts about seeing her mother again. Nacho confesses to Petita everything he feels for teacher Eréndida, who listens to everything.
133	21	"La espera terminó"	26 September 2022	2.1
Lucero discovers that money is missing from what she had saved. Fernanda insists on being friends with Petita and wants them to live as a family with Patricio, but Refugio rejects her idea. Rómulo is furious that plans with Agustín are getting out of hand. Leonarda teaches Lucero how to sell her products through social media. Rómulo arrives to threaten Agustín for not being good at his deposition rehearsals. Petita is nervous about the reunion with her mother.
134	22	"Te quiero mucho"	27 September 2022	2.5
With the reunion between Olga and Petita, Patricio sees his daughter's mother again. Lucero confronts Mundo about the disappearance of her money. Olga is upset to learn that her mother saw the reunion with Petita by video call. Rómulo follows the steps of each of the members of the Chavero family and friends. Iñigo suffers Olga's rudeness after his arrival from Xochimilco. Patricio insists on knowing what happened in the last days of Julián's life. Lázaro finds Renato in Rebeca's room and is furious to see them together. Patricio tells Olga about his plans to marry Fernanda, but Olga loses control.
135	23	"Todo salió mal"	28 September 2022	2.6
Olga lashes out at Patricio and humiliates everyone. Leonarda and Lucero start with the filming of their blog. Mundo tries to reconcile with Lucero. Mercedes learns about the fights at Olga's dinner. Lucero comments with Julieta that she might have to separate from Mundo. Olga asks Érika for information about Iñigo. Patricio worries that something might happen to him on the trip to Ensenada and asks Nacho to take care of Petita as his daughter if he should die.
136	24	"No es un juguete, es una niña"	29 September 2022	2.1
Olga goes to Refugio's house to apologize for her behavior. Lucero seeks out Refugio to tell her about the problems she is having with Mundo and while talking to her about her pregnancy, Olga arrives and makes Lucero uncomfortable with a series of comments. Olga believes that her mother planned the reunion with Petita so that she would not be alone for the rest of her life and decides to take her to live with her in Spain.
137	25	"Se acabó la tonta"	30 September 2022	2.0
The school in Italy offers Nacho the opportunity to resume his studies. Lucero discovers Mundo's infidelity, when he arrives home, she confronts him and kicks him out. Martina asks Refugio for support so that Nacho reconsiders his decision about his studies in Italy. Patricio and Fernanda visit Mundo to help solve his problems with Lucero.
138	26	"No es justo que se case"	3 October 2022	2.0
Patricio offers Petita to spend the day together. Olga explains to Erika that the reason she opposes Patricio's wedding is to start a family again by his side. Lázaro is afraid of Patricio's presence because of the investigation he is conducting into Julián's death. Patricio discovers inconsistencies with Julián's death, and accidentally discovers the news of Rómulo's trial. Refugio talks to Lucero about the problems she and Mundo are having and discovers that everything is getting worse. Nacho and Eréndida have a romantic date in which each confesses their love for each other.
139	27	"Todos estamos en peligro"	4 October 2022	2.4
Renato and Rebeca consider seeking Patricio for advice regarding Julián's will, Diana overhears them and tries to make them believe that the Chaveros are the enemy. Romulo shows up at Petita's school and tries to take her home. Patricio returns from his trip and informs Refugio that Rómulo is out of prison. Olga dreams that she kisses Patricio. Patricio meets Romulo and confronts him. In light of Romulo's freedom, Patricio decides to move up the trip to Spain to get Petita and Refugio out of his reach. Mundo resigns from his job to save his marriage. Germán seeks out Patricio to ask for his help in testifying against Rómulo at the trial, out of fear he rejects the opportunity.
140	28	"Los declaro marido y mujer"	5 October 2022	2.4
Patricio surprises Rómulo by showing up and testifying against him, the hearing is postponed. Mercedes is desperate to fly to Mexico to prevent Rómulo from hurting Olga. Rogelio declares his love for Mercedes. Lázaro warns Diana that she has to find a copy of Julián's will on her own. Mundo complains to Lucero for having talked to his mother about their marital problems. Everything is ready for Patricio and Fernanda's wedding, but Petita is opposed to her father marrying Fernanda. Despite Petita's refusal, Patricio and Fernanda manage to become spouses.
141	29	"Que nadie empañe su felicidad"	6 October 2022	2.2
Rómulo tries to convince Agustín to take care of Patricio's disappearance. Olga misinterprets Petita's comment and shows up at Patricio's party, unaware that it is his wedding celebration. Rómulo looks for people to testify on his behalf. Mundo insults Refugio and Nacho puts a stop to him. Lázaro spies on Rebeca. Refugio learns that Mundo is already living with another woman. In view of Patricio's visit, Lázaro is forced to take charge of his disappearance, just as he did with Julián.
142	30	"Me quiero ir a vivir con mi mamá"	7 October 2022	1.8
Seeing the severity of Patricio's statements, Bátiz decides to request a confrontation, which is accepted by the judge. Refugio fears for Patricio's safety now that he has decided to testify against Rómulo. Patricio shows Petita photos of the apartment where they will live with Fernanda, Petita prefers to live with Olga in Spain. Rómulo tries to dismiss Patricio's accusations by confessing to the jury the derogatory way in which he was ashamed of his own mother. Patricio reveals that there are corpses that correspond to people related to some cases Rómulo won.
143	31	"Aquí está tu papá que te va a proteger"	10 October 2022	2.3
Lázaro arrives in town to meet with Patricio. Rómulo decides to attend Petita's party to introduce himself to her. Fernanda feels estranged from Petita and now even more so with the arrival of Olga. Refugio confronts Rómulo about his sudden appearance at Petita's party. Diana looks through Lázaro's briefcase and finds a vial with the substance he used to kill Julián. Petita assures that Rómulo will be able to prove his innocence so he can be happy with his family. Aside from his plans to eliminate him, Rómulo plans to distract Patricio with Petita's parental rights trial.
144	32	"Patricio Chavero está muerto"	11 October 2022	2.4
Patricio and Fernanda sign the rental contract of their new home. Refugio has a bad feeling after Patricio leaves for his meeting with Lázaro. Nacho discovers that Petita is not at school, Olga calls Refugio to tell her that she has Petita. Patricio goes to the place where his daughter is and warns Olga that it will be the last time she will see them. Later Rómulo attacks Patricio as he is leaving his house. Patricio manages to enter the house, Refugio runs to his aid but he dies. Judge Úlloa informs Rómulo that thanks to Patricio's death, the trial will be delayed for several months.
145	33	"Nada me va a devolver a mi hijo"	12 October 2022	2.4
Refugio is sure that Patricio was a victim of Rómulo. Olga finds out that Patricio is dead and goes crazy with the news. Rómulo tells Olga that he was very close to seeing Patricio die. Bátiz advises Olga and Rómulo not to apply for custody of Petita. Diana suspects that Lázaro had something to do with Patricio's death. Olga shows up at Patricio's funeral to offer condolences to the Chaveros. Refugio notices that Rómulo sent a floral arrangement to Patricio's funeral, freaks out and faints.
146	34	"Usted mató a mi hijo"	13 October 2022	2.0
Fernanda and Lucero prevent Olga from taking Petita. A week after Patricio's death, Refugio regains consciousness, but does not want to return to her old house. Rómulo is enraged by the postponement of his trial. Rómulo learns of Mercerdes' return to Mexico and asks Olga for information about her mother. Before being discharged, Rómulo visits Refugio, Nacho takes him out by force. Petita reiterates to Fernanda her desire to go live with Olga.
147	35	"No me puedo dejar caer"	14 October 2022	2.6
An agent visits Rómulo to question him about Patricio's death. Mercedes advises Refugio that it would be best for Petita to live in Spain away from Rómulo, Refugio refuses to move away from Petita. Olga offers Rómulo a deal, her favorable testimony in exchange for custody of Petita. Rómulo shows up unexpectedly at Mercedes' house, she puts a stop to his attempts to manipulate her.
148	36	"No tienes perdón"	17 October 2022	2.1
Mercedes informs Olga of the agreements she reached with Refugio about Petita. Fernanda is saddened by Petita's rejection despite her intentions to get closer. Mercedes realizes how much Rómulo has manipulated Olga. Rómulo has threatened Flor after admitting that he knew about her affair with Patricio. Nacho finds Mundo in the doctor's office and tells him that Patricio died. Mundo goes to his family's house, but is surprised to learn that they no longer live there. Fernanda appears at Refugio's house and reveals to everyone that she is pregnant.
149	37	"Perdóname, mamá"	18 October 2022	2.5
Refugio and her family celebrate Fernanda's pregnancy, except for Petita. Upon accepting the reality of Patricio's death, Mundo checks his voicemail and realizes that it was Roxana who prevented him from learning the news. Mundo shows up at Refugio's house ready to face the consequences of his estrangement from his family. Rómulo will have to testify for the crime against Patricio Chavero. The police show up at Olga's house to question her about Rómulo's whereabouts the night Patricio was attacked. Petita insists to Refugio to allow her to live with Olga and Mercedes in Spain since she is not willing to live with Fernanda.
150	38	"Mi hija por fin va a ser mía"	19 October 2022	2.4
Lázaro learns that he is under investigation in the case of Patricio's death. Refugio and Nacho are worried about the economic problems in their family. Olga overhears her father talking to Agustín about his desire to keep Mercedes' fortune. Martina receives the invitation to Chelo's wedding in front of Nacho. Mercedes surprises Refugio with a valuable gift. Refugio explains to Mercedes how she has come to a decision regarding Petita's custody. Rómulo insists on knowing everything about Mercedes' will and asks Olga for her help. Despite her concerns, Mercedes informs Olga of her decision to allow Petita to live with them.
151	39	"Te voy a extrañar"	20 October 2022	2.1
Mercedes warns Olga that Rómulo will not be able to see Petita. Mundo apologizes to Patricio for not following his advice. Refugio begs Mundo to look for Lucero and try to rebuild his family. Fernanda is rejected by her family, despite her condition.
152	40	"Una muy mala copia tuya"	21 October 2022	2.3
Rómulo assures that he is innocent of what happened with Patricio. Mundo apologizes to Lucero for his behavior, although she accepts his apology, she does not want him back in the house. Olga decides not to take Petita to school so she can spend the day with Rómulo. Diana finds the chest that Lázaro wanted so much. Refugio looks for Olga to tell her how rude Petita has been since she moved in with her.
153	41	"Una visita de familia"	24 October 2022	2.1
Mercedes threatens Petita with setting limits because of her behavior. Rómulo visits Refugio with the intention of teasing her about her poverty, Refugio is surprised to see that he arrived accompanied by Petita. Refugio threatens Rómulo and Rómulo decides to leave Petita with her. Rebeca confesses to Diana and Renato the actions of Lázaro that make her fear him so much, Diana does not believe her.
154	42	"Bajo nuestras condiciones"	25 October 2022	2.6
Flor arrives at Rómulo's house to tell him that she is leaving the country and their relationship ends. Lucero is worried about what will happen to her relationship with Mundo. Refugio and Mercedes visit Rómulo to establish rules so that he can visit Petita, but he is furious. Roxana is upset when she learns that Mundo has left her without her drugs. Upon arriving home, Mercedes faints.
155	43	"Solo tú puedes salvarla"	26 October 2022	2.3
Rogelio informs Olga that her mother needs a bone marrow transplant. Agustín realizes that there is no official document certifying the death of Baldomero, father of the Chavero brothers. Afraid to make a decision, Olga asks Rómulo for advice on the transplant, Rómulo recommends her to refuse. Refugio is glad that her sons are focusing on pursuing their personal and professional happiness.
156	44	"Esto no va a terminar bien"	27 October 2022	2.4
Leonarda has some doubts about the new client in her business with Lucero. Nacho tells Mundo and Refugio the reasons why he broke up with Chelito, he also lets them know about his intentions to return to the boxing world once he quits the mechanic shop. Petita accidentally calls Fernanda in search of comfort. Lucero is attacked on Roxana's orders. Chelito sees a social media post by Eréndira and realizes that she has lost Nacho's love and regrets her actions.
157	45	"No hay que tentar al destino"	28 October 2022	1.8
Mundo confronts Roxana about what happened with Lucero, but she threatens to hurt his family. Mercedes discovers that Petita demands to eat lobster, but when she tries to call her attention to it, she is defended by Olga. Chelito returns to Mexico to see Nacho, but he does not receive her in the best way. Mercedes calls Olga's attention for not being a good mother to Petita and assures her that she could return to Refugio. Mundo receives a summons from the public prosecutor's office to testify about the physical aggressions against Roxana.
158	46	"Yo seré tu donadora"	31 October 2022	2.5
Flor asks Rómulo for the agreed payment for the administration of his companies, and in response to his mockery, she slaps him. Mundo defends himself against Roxana's accusations by proving that the attack on Lucero was orchestrated by her. Faced with Mercedes' desperation to get better, Refugio offers herself as a bone marrow donor, provoking Olga's jealousy. Seeing Chelito's insistence, Tadeo points out to Nacho that maybe she has not stopped loving him and wants to regain his love. Mundo and Lucero begin to talk, managing to settle the differences that caused their separation.
159	47	"¡Te voy a robar!"	1 November 2022	2.4
Mundo and Lucero tell Refugio that they have patched up their differences to be together. Agustín asks Olga out. Renato and Rebeca continue with their plan to ruin any possible sale of the house. Refugio dreams the memory of Patricio's death and wakes up in a rush. Chelito prepares a surprise for Nacho because she wants to stay by his side. Rómulo shows up at Refugio's house where even Petita rejects his company. Chelito takes advantage of being with Nacho to steal a kiss.
160	48	"El amor es un trabajo de todos los días"	2 November 2022	2.5
Nacho asks Chelito to keep her distance as they both have a commitment with their current partners. Nacho begins to confuse his feelings for Eréndira and Chelito. Chelito admits that she is still in love with Nacho, but Martina asks her daughter to think things through. Mundo discovers Rogelio in his home and the plans he has for his mother to be the tissue donor for Mercedes. As a thank you for Refugio's sacrifice, Rogelio offers to help her with a new treatment for glaucoma. Chelito returns to look for Nacho in the workshop insisting on becoming friends again, Eréndira discovers what is going on with her boyfriend. Roxana surprises Refugio when she arrives at the neighborhood and attacks her, throwing Mundo in his face that she had warned him.
161	49	"Aquí el único héroe soy yo"	3 November 2022	2.9
Rómulo arrives at Refugio's house before Roxana can attack her, showing himself to be a hero. Rebeca wants to testify against Lázaro for what he has done. Chelito seeks Refugio's help to convince Nacho to go to Oaxaca, Refugio refuses even if it means losing her job and friendship with Martina. Eréndira seeks Fernanda's help to find out about Nacho's past and the pain Chelito caused him. Germán visits Roxana to warn her to stay away from the Chavero family or they will proceed to file a formal complaint. Lázaro meets with Rómulo, who sees the Chavero family as a nuisance and wants them eliminated.
162	50	"La diferencia entre la vida y la muerte"	4 November 2022	2.5
Lázaro comments with Rómulo about the deaths of Julián and Patricio, unaware that he is being recorded by Rómulo to use his words against him. Dr. Cáceres is deeply grateful to Refugio for what she has done for Mercedes. Rómulo confronts Flor about her visit to Judge Ulloa and threatens her if she considers betraying him. Nacho chooses to come clean with Eréndira and tells her about the kiss he had with Chelito. Refugio explains to Olga the regret she might feel if she does not decide to be the bone marrow donor her mother needs. Nacho explains to Chelito how he still has feelings for her and that he has finally made a decision about their future.
163	51	"Quedamos como amigos"	7 November 2022	2.0
Nacho asks Chelito to leave him alone since they already had a chance to be happy together. Lázaro loses control when he is questioned about Patricio's death. Chelito looks for Eréndira to admit defeat and explains that the kiss was her fault and wishes her well with Nacho. Olga tries to convince Fernanda to stay away from Petita but Fernanda defends herself and, in view of her failure, Olga comments that she kissed Patricio. At a press conference, Lázaro is attacked by journalists for accusations of his involvement in Patricio's death. Romulo and Petita go to an amusement park, she tries to play with him but he gets tired and becomes violent in front of Refugio and Julieta.
164	52	"Un favor para mi familia"	8 November 2022	2.5
Refugio and Julieta confront Rómulo for the mistreatment of Petita. Olga learns that Petita wants to return to her grandmother and complains to Refugio and Nacho. Mundo asks Rómulo to testify against Roxana, Rómulo sees it as an opportunity to ask for a favor in return. Eréndira calls Nacho to see the possibility of resuming their relationship. Rómulo visits Fernanda with the intention of winning her favor.
165	53	"Mamita, no te mueras"	9 November 2022	2.5
Worried about money, Mundo and Nacho begin to argue. Afraid of facing Lázaro again, Rebecca confesses to Refugio all of her stepfather's actions and the reason why she believes he was behind Julián's death. Mundo arrives at the gym to apologize to Nacho and admits that it was wrong what he did. Olga learns that Lázaro was arrested. Tired of the side effects of the chemotherapy, Mercedes opts to give up the treatment and wait for Olga to decide to be her donor.
166	54	"¡Rómulo no es inocente!"	10 November 2022	2.6
Diana discusses with the twins about Lázaro and whether or not he deserves to be in jail. Later, Diana receives a call to inform her that Lázaro is out of the political party to which he belonged. The notary visits Refugio to give her information about Julián's real will in which he states that she is the heiress to half of the house. Knowing Olga's determination to be Mercedes' donor, Rómulo resorts to excuses and lies to make his daughter desist. Refugio decides that the best thing to do is to fight for the house in order to look after the twins' interests. Diana surprises Rómulo by arriving at his house ready to do anything to secure her new source of income.
167	55	"Todo en esta vida se paga"	11 November 2022	2.4
Refugio receives Juan Carlos' fruit basket along with an invitation to go for coffee; she refuses both. Rómulo insists on kissing Diana, but she rejects him. Mundo receives a call from the hospital needing his visit; he prefers to hide what is happening from Lucero. With the resumption of Rómulo's trial, Gonzalo asks for Refugio's support; after debating she finally decides to follow up on Patricio's decision. Diana tells Rebeca that she is willing to help her in her statement against Lázaro. Mundo discovers that Roxana is the sister of El Pollo, an enemy from the past. Rómulo cries in front of Olga and assures her that he hopes Mercedes will forgive him.
168	56	"¿Qué me está pasando?"	14 November 2022	2.8
Petita mentions to Eréndida the suffering her uncle Nacho is going through and hopes this will make her think again. Refugio suffers a crisis when she loses her vision, Agustín anonymously helps her before Mundo arrives. Lázaro warns Diana of what could happen if she does not help him stop Rómulo with his revenge. Rómulo confronts Rogelio about his financial interest in Mercedes. Mercedes offers Rómulo a truce for the sake of Olga and Petita. Baldomero shows up at Refugio's house, Mundo and Nacho offer him their help because they don't know who he is.
169	57	"¡Echaste a la calle a tus propios hijos!"	15 November 2022	2.7
Baldomero is remorseful for his past actions, but Refugio does not forgive the abandonment to which he subjected his sons and slaps him. Diana feels betrayed by her Renato and Rebeca as they are willing to follow Julián's real last will and plan to contest the will. Mundo confesses to Lucero that he has gone to visit Roxana at the clinic, she is fed up with continuing to put up with his lies. Olga continues to debate whether to donate marrow to her mother while Rómulo pressures her to finally lay her to rest. Mundo learns that Roxana has been discharged from the clinic, he immediately worries about Lucero's well-being.
170	58	"Baldomero nos echó porque le estorbábamos"	16 November 2022	2.9
Roxana demands Mundo that if he does not want her brothers to go after Lucero, he should leave her and go live with her again. Rómulo asks Lázaro to continue to keep silent about their relationship, in exchange in a few years he will request a trial to exonerate him. Mundo tries to understand Baldomero's reasons for returning, fearing that he wants to get closer to his father, Refugio explains to him the real reason why he threw them out to the street. Faced with the severity of the charges against him, Lázaro resorts to telling Germán everything about his relationship with Rómulo. Mundo visits the altar where Julián and Patricio's ashes lie, regrets never having listened to their advice and that they are not there when he needs them most.
171	59	"Yo voy a ganar al final"	17 November 2022	2.8
Diana visits Rómulo dismayed by her image if Rebeca's report becomes known, Rómulo offers his help. Romulo visits Mundo to pressure him to speak well of him with Petita in order to recover his relationship with his granddaughter. Bátiz tries to prepare Olga to testify on Romulo's behalf but, faced with her foolishness, he believes her incapable of testifying on behalf of her own father. Romulo does not miss the opportunity to warn Mundo that his mother is in danger by testifying against him. Refugio is ready to testify against Romulo but is surprised to realize that Baldomero is working with Romulo.
172	60	"¡Arresten a ese hombre!"	18 November 2022	2.6
The trial against Rómulo begins. Rómulo makes strong accusations against the Chaveros and provokes Refugio's fury. The judge postpones the trial against Rómulo. After losing his temper, Nacho is sent to jail for misconduct during Rómulo's trial. Rómulo warns Baldomero that the weakest link of the Chaveros is Mundo and asks him to approach him to continue his revenge. Mundo travels to celebrate the inauguration of Polo's business, but feels followed by a man and fears the worst.
173	61	"Algo anda muy mal"	21 November 2022	2.6
Rómulo tells Diana of his intentions, and she accepts without hesitation. Mercedes regrets that Olga does not share her happiness at marrying Cáceres. Mundo confronts Roxana about him being followed and threatens her to keep her people away from his family. Petita tells Refugio about her plans to organize an event and raise the money her grandmother Mercedes needs for treatment. Julieta informs Mundo that someone broke into the neighborhood and painted Lucero's house with threats, he decides to take the risk and fix it before Lucero returns. While Mundo tries to repair the damage to Lucero's house, Baldomero surprises him by sneaking in.
174	62	"Edmundo me dejó"	22 November 2022	2.6
Mundo agrees to meet with Baldomero and gives him a chance to clarify his past actions. Bátiz visits Refugio to warn her of Rómulo's plans for Petita. Mundo leaves a floral arrangement and a note at Lucero's house as a farewell.
175	63	"El precio que tendrás que pagar"	23 November 2022	2.8
Baldomero interrogates Mundo about Refugio's health and offers to pay for her medical expenses. Mundo is taken to the warehouse where the Hermanos Mayores are meeting and is forced to join the organization. Mundo answers Refugio's call but Baldomero snatches the phone from him, she hears her ex-husband's voice and worries about her son. Lucero is tired of excusing Mundo and decides to move on with her life without questioning Mundo's reasons for leaving. Baldomero arrives at Refugio's house and she demands the reason why he came back into their lives.
176	64	"Tú qué sabes de amor"	24 November 2022	2.3
Baldomero tries to convince Refugio of his good intentions but she doesn't believe him. Baldomero explains to Mundo how he offered his help to Refugio but in return, Nacho ended up beating him. Nacho decides to look for Mundo and Baldomero to claim the missing money; while trying to stop him, Refugio temporarily loses her sight. Rogelio confirms his suspicions that Refugio's health is not responding to treatment as expected.
177	65	"¡No veo nada!"	25 November 2022	2.4
Nacho is tired of being burdened with the problems of the whole family. Refugio has another episode of blindness, the doctor advises her not to get exhausted as this is what causes her episodes. Olga goes out to dinner with Bátiz. At breakfast, Petita reveals to her grandmother that Olga has a surprise prepared for her; when questioned, Olga denies everything. Nacho scolds Mundo for the missing money; when he interrogates Baldomero, he realizes who his father really is.
178	66	"Rómulo fue exonerado"	28 November 2022	2.8
Olga asks Rogelio to keep her donation confidential until the day of the operation. Mundo begins to suspect that his father is lying to him as he realizes the inconsistencies he tells him. Bátiz manages to have the evidence against Rómulo dismissed. Mundo forces Baldomero to tell him the truth behind his visit to Rómulo, Baldomero lies with a supposed job search. Germán informs Refugio that Rómulo is one step away from being exonerated of the charges against him.
179	67	"Esa tipa se quiere robar a mi hija"	29 November 2022	2.5
Rómulo asks for more money from Úlloa, but he questions him about the outstanding debt. Refugio, Fernanda and Germán devise a plan to prevent Rómulo and Olga from getting custody of Petita. Olga complains to Rómulo that Fernanda requested custody of Petita, hindering her plans to return to Spain. Mundo receives a message from the older brothers threatening to harm Lucero. Bátiz confesses to Úlloa that the stumble in Petita's custody request was on purpose. Nacho finds Mundo and complains to him about his attitudes. Mercedes continues with her wedding planning but the pains she feels force her to follow up on her plans for after her death.
180	68	"Olvídense de mí"	30 November 2022	2.5
Refugio finds Mundo at her house returning the money Baldomero stole, he tries to put distance by disowning her. Bátiz confesses to Úlloa that apart from the attraction he feels for Olga, he is also using her against Rómulo. Nacho looks for Mundo to complain about his mistreatment of Refugio, Mundo explains what is really happening. Olga's body is not withstanding the transplant procedure.
181	69	"Fuiste muy generosa"	1 December 2022	2.5
Refugio learns that Olga was Mercedes' donor. Olga confesses to Rogelio that the medicine she took before the operation was because Rómulo gave it to her. Rómulo visits Olga to complain about her being Mercedes' donor and ruining his plans to inherit her fortune.
182	70	"Mátame de una vez"	2 December 2022	2.3
While Rómulo complains to Olga for having accepted the transplant, Rogelio defends her. Martina gives Refugio several gifts that her admirer left her while she was convalescing. Baldomero confesses to Mundo his complicity with Rómulo. Mundo asks for Nacho's help to deal with Baldomero's problem, they accidentally discover that he is still alive. Rómulo decides to use Baldomero one last time to bring pain and misery into Refugio's life as revenge for the time he was imprisoned.
183	71	"¡Ahí viene la novia!"	5 December 2022	2.5
Germán and Fernanda tell Refugio that their plan to obtain custody of Petita has been successful. Without realizing that they are in a live broadcast, Lucero confesses to Leonarda her feelings regarding Mundo's abandonment. Refugio is frightened to see Mundo and Nacho arrive at his house accompanied by Baldomero, who is convalescing from the attack he suffered. Mercedes and Rogelio get married in a civil ceremony. While preparing to see a local shop, Lucero is surprised to see Mundo pass by without even turning to look at her.
184	72	"¡Esperanza es mi hija!"	6 December 2022	2.3
Mundo confronts Rómulo and demands an explanation about his approach to Baldomero. Baldomero thanks Nacho, Refugio and Mundo for their support; Baldomero regrets having thrown them out of his house. Eréndira wants to marry Nacho but only if he accepts the conditions she sets for him. Olga slaps Fernanda in a fit of jealousy because of her closeness to Petita.
185	73	"Me das miedo, mami"	7 December 2022	2.5
Olga provokes fear in Petita with her angry outbursts. Petita accuses Rómulo of Olga's actions and tells him about Mercedes' wedding. Lucero finds out that Mundo's abandonment was not for another woman, but to protect her. Nacho makes sure Baldomero returns to Zacatecas; as he says goodbye, Nacho forgives him. Refugio questions Nacho about his encounter with Baldomero and fears Mundo is following in her ex-husband's footsteps.
186	74	"Ya no puedo más"	8 December 2022	2.2
Rebeca throws in Lázaro's face all the accusations against him, when she sees how he dismisses them all, she runs away and falls down the stairs, postponing the trial. Mercedes suspects that something is wrong with her tests and confronts Rogelio to find out if she is improving or not. Refugio visits the Renato and Rebeca. Figuring he is in danger, Lucero visits Mundo.
187	75	"Mercedes acaba de fallecer"	9 December 2022	2.2
Olga gets ready to attend the Cuquitón, and as she says goodbye to her mother, she worries about the words she dedicates to her before leaving. During the livestream of the Cuquitón, Mercedes dies in the arms of Rogelio. The news of Mercedes' death shocks everyone in the auditorium, Rómulo celebrates the news. Distraught by the death of her mother, Olga seeks comfort in the arms of Agustín; in the confusion she kisses him. Agustín wants to accompany Olga during her mother's funeral; Rómulo mocks his employee's sudden sensitivity.
188	76	"Me quedé sola"	12 December 2022	2.2
Rogelio tries to approach Olga during Mercedes' funeral, but she blames him for her mother's death. Petita tries to console Olga during the funeral but she neglects her daughter. Mundo tells Nacho about his plans to infiltrate Rómulo's team to try to find out more about his plans. Shielded by Olga, Rómulo arrives at the house ready to get rid of anyone who opposed him. Rómulo plans the steps he will take to take over Mercedes' estate once it is inherited by Olga.
189	77	"Compartimos el mismo hombre"	13 December 2022	2.6
Refugio worries about the power she will face once Olga and Romulo inherit Mercedes' estate. Olga finds Rómulo kissing Diana when visiting him. Rómulo pressures Olga to travel to Spain to find out about Mercedes' will, Agustín and Bátiz dispute over who will accompany her. Roxana appears at Lucero's house and intimidates and threatens her to stay away from Mundo.
190	78	"Los legítimos propietarios"	14 December 2022	2.4
Diana asks Renato and Rebeca for a chance to live together in peace as a family, they accept without knowing that it is one more trap of their mother. Roxana threatens Lucero with getting rid of her baby. Erika informs Refugio about the reading of Mercedes' will and asks her to attend. Lucero warns Mundo not to go near her or her daughter again as she has decided to make a new life for himself with someone else. Olga brags to Agustín about the millionaire's life she will enjoy once she receives her inheritance. Lucero faces a serious health crisis. Olga refers to Patricio as if he were still alive.
191	79	"Heredera universal"	15 December 2022	2.7
During the reading of Mercedes' will, Rómulo is surprised to discover that his ex-wife's heiress is Petita. Refugio consults with Erika about Rómulo's possible move to acquire Mercedes' fortune. Knowing she is the heiress to her grandmother's fortune, Petita begins to make a list of things she could spend her money on, worrying Refugio. Rómulo summons Mundo to talk about Refugio and his next decision; without knowing the reason, Mundo warns him about his mother.
192	80	"La vida de ambas corre peligro"	16 December 2022	2.5
Refugio gets Olga to come to her senses about Mercedes' decision to inherit Petita. Julieta is concerned to see Lucero as a strong, independent woman; Polo argues that she should be allowed to grow up on her own. Lucero goes into labor. After the surgery, Lucero wakes up and worries when she does not see her daughter by her side. With Nacho's help, Mundo manages to get into the hospital without his family seeing him; he visits Lucero to meet his daughter, Emma.
193	81	"¡Lo mataron!"	19 December 2022	2.5
Roxana warns Mundo that Lucero and her daughter are in danger because he visited them in the hospital. Refugio shows Petita a video that Mercedes left for them before she died. Ulloa and Bátiz plan their next move to prevent Rómulo from betraying them again. Roxana shoots Mundo for faking Baldomero's death, but Baldomero intervenes. Rómulo learns of Baldomero's death and plans to use it as an excuse to get closer to Refugio.
194	82	"Tú la mataste"	20 December 2022	2.4
Mundo looks for Roxana to confront her about Baldomero's death, but finds her dead because of an overdose. Rómulo tries to convince Refugio to allow Petita to live with Olga, seeing her refusal he tries to provoke her anger. Rómulo pressures Olga to keep fighting for custody of Petita, she realizes that his only interest is the inheritance. Brayan accuses Mundo of having provoked Roxana's death, they fight without realizing that the lab is on fire. Nacho and Refugio visit Olga to recover Petita.
195	83	"Yo no soy un premio"	21 December 2022	2.5
Petita realizes that Rómulo's presence makes Refugio uncomfortable and prefers to leave with her instead of staying with for lunch. Olga overhears how Rómulo makes an agreement with Agustín to convince her to claim custody of Petita. Julieta finds Mundo at Lucero's house and tells him to leave for the sake of Lucero and their daughter. Polo points out to Julieta that she is abandoning him for continuing to overprotect Lucero. Olga tells Refugio that despite her love for Petita, she knows she is not ready to take care of her.
196	84	"En nombre de nuestra amistad"	22 December 2022	2.4
Lucero asks Mundo to fight so they can be together. Agustín tries to explain to Olga that his feelings for her are real. Olga rejects Agustín so he decides to stay away from her for good. Julieta complains to Refugio about being so permissive with Mundo, as she believes that he has only brought misfortune to Lucero's life. Lucero demands Julieta that she stop interfering in her life.
197	85	"Vamos a unir fuerzas"	23 December 2022	2.2
Rómulo visits Lazaro to discuss the foreign account and Diana's divorce. Rómulo celebrates with Diana having achieved the divorce from Lázaro, he hides from her what has been achieved regarding the international account. Martina complains to Julieta for the way she treated Refugio, but Julieta insists on keeping Mundo away from his family. Olga finds Rómulo with Diana again, Olga demands respect from him since he is a guest in her house. Rómulo manipulates Olga until he convinces her that Petita must be with her no matter what.
198	86	"Yo tengo que ayudarlo"	26 December 2022	2.3
Rebecca and Renato ask for Diana's help to make sure that Lázaro remains imprisoned, she confesses her suspicions that he killed Julián. Nacho takes Refugio to see Mundo but they are surprised by Brayan and fear that Refugio is in danger. Nacho and Fernanda explain to Refugio the situation Mundo is in. Rebecca and Germán inform Refugio that the evidence points to Lázaro being behind Julián's death. Moments before Lázaro is released, Refugio bursts in demanding that they consider the new evidence in Julián's death.
199	87	"Poco a poco se hace justicia"	27 December 2022	2.6
While Eréndira waits for Nacho in the park, Brayan approaches her with the intention of kidnapping her, and when she tries to flee she runs into Mundo, who defends her. After testifying, Refugio slaps Diana for having kept silent. Olga's night is interrupted by a serenade from Bátiz. Refugio visits Lázaro in jail demanding answers as to why he killed Julián and Patricio.
200	88	"Yo no maté a Patricio"	28 December 2022	2.4
Knowing he is unlikely to be released, Lázaro decides to confess all his actions to Refugio as well as a warning about a person is more dangerous than him. Rómulo explodes when he discovers that Refugio got Petita's guardianship and makes a series of demands to Ulloa; but tUlloa does not intend to follow orders without his reward. Agustín asks Olga to be his girlfriend, but she rejects him. Rómulo visits Mundo to offer his help with the Hermanos Mayores and finally be reunited with his family without fear of retaliation.
201	89	"Un Chavero nunca se da por vencido"	29 December 2022	2.5
A gym client steals a kiss from Nacho at the same time Eréndira arrives, she believes he is unfaithful. Suspecting that Rómulo had something to do with Patricio's death, Refugio decides to change her treatment of him, setting conditions for them to coexist in peace. During a livestream, Leonarda goes into labor; Lucero tries to help her while Silvestre arrives but the birth is recorded for all to see. After Leonarda's delivery, Lucero and Julieta share a moment in which they give each other the opportunity to fix the problems between them.
202	90	"Entre la espada y la pared"	30 December 2022	2.2
As they gather for the family meal, Rómulo mocks the innocence with which she once treated him; she is forced to endure the mockery. Rómulo orchestrates a meeting between Refugio and Mundo so that he can convince his mother to give him Petita's fortune. Mundo's boss notices Mundo's poor organization in the drug warehouse and calls his attention to it. Rómulo tries to convince Diana to sell her house in Ensenada to invest the proceeds in the account; she is unaware that it is a scam. Bátiz realizes the complicated case Mundo finds himself in and plans to use it to argue in Petita's custody appeal.
203	91	"El arriesgado trato de Rómulo"	2 January 2023	2.6
Thanks to Ulloa, Rómulo learns that Mundo is working for the older brothers. After making love with Agustín, Olga does not seem to want to leave his side. After being kidnapped, Rómulo manages to negotiate his freedom and reaches an agreement with the older brothers. Refugio's friends organize an occasion in which Refugio and Juan Carlos can meet and she manages to see him in a better light. Refugio once again has problems with her eyesight, Rómulo takes advantage of this to set a trap that he can use against her.
204	92	"¡No me voy a ir contigo nunca!"	3 January 2023	2.6
Rómulo tries to manipulate the people around them into believing that Refugio's blindness was the cause of the accident in which Petita was involved. Olga complains to Refugio for allowing the accident to happen in the market; Petita comes to her defense and refuses to go with Olga. Nacho tells Refugio that Mundo has already decided to support Rómulo and is disappointed that he has turned his back on them. Despite Polo's efforts to take care of Julieta, she decides that things between them no longer work out.
205	93	"No puede hacerse cargo de Petita"	4 January 2023	2.7
Mundo discovers that the boss had Brayan killed for having snitched to the police about the operation. Olga overhears Rómulo talking about his real interest in fighting for custody of Petita and confronts him. Renato throws in Diana's face that having forgotten his 18th birthday was the last thing he will tolerate. While Úlloa gives Rómulo the news that he has succeeded in his plans, Bátiz gives Refugio a summons for Petita's custody appeal.
206	94	"¡No quiero dejar a mi mamá Cuquita!"	5 January 2023	2.7
Olga refuses to continue fighting for custody of Petita and prevails over Rómulo despite his claims. Petita begs Olga to let her continue living with Refugio, Olga promises her that she will do so for her happiness. Olga realizes that she cannot run away with Agustín and explains her reasons. Petita gives Nacho a letter from Eréndira; he is distracted reading it without realizing that thugs are around Petita.
207	95	"Me acabo de casar"	6 January 2023	2.6
Úlloa assures Rómulo that the appeal will go in his favor, Rómulo issues a death threat if his plans do not go as he wishes. Juan Carlos surprises Refugio with a bouquet of roses. Agustín gets tired of Olga's attitudes and gives her an ultimatum so that she finally decides to do something about her life or she can forget about him. Olga summons Rómulo to give him the surprise that she married Agustín, ruining his plans to take over Mercedes' fortune.
208	96	"¡Me van a quitar a mi nieta!"	9 January 2023	2.6
Germán tells Fernanda about Nacho's warning that someone was following him when he picked up Petita. Rómulo warns Olga that if she does not do everything necessary to regain custody of Petita, he will declare her incompetent to commit her to a psychiatric hospital for the rest of her life. Upon returning to the city, Eréndira visits Nacho to settle the problems between them; Nacho is still determined to go to Oaxaca. Mundo finds out that Rómulo visited Pablo and hears that they are planning an attack on the market where Refugio's family and friends go to. Eréndira explains to Refugio the real reasons why she decided to stay away from Nacho.
209	97	"Horas críticas"	10 January 2023	2.5
The Hermanos Mayores surprise Germán and attack him in the street. Knowing that she could lose custody of Petita, Refugio takes advantage of every moment she can get with her granddaughter. Olga discovers Agustín talking about a very important case and realizes that he does not want to confess what the case is about. Rómulo plans with Ulloa and Bátiz the next step to take once he wins custody of Petita, one of the options being killing her. Petita, no longer willing to put up with the school principal, tells her what she thinks and ends up getting expelled.
210	98	"Espero sepas cuidar a Petita"	11 January 2023	3.0
Rómulo is unwilling to put up with Olga's whims, so he forces her to go to court to fight for custody of Petita. During the trial, Bátiz attacks Refugio to get her to respond favorably to Olga's case. Refugio declares the true reasons why Rómulo is interested in obtaining custody of Petita, he attacks her and they have words with each other. Refugio reveals to Petita the birth of her brother, Patricio, but Petita rejects him for fear of being displaced. The judge determines that given the evidence presented, Olga will regain custody of Petita. Refugio blames Rómulo for taking her family, starting with Patricio.
211	99	"Petita sigue siendo nuestra"	12 January 2023	2.7
The judge rules that custody of Petita will have to be shared between Refugio and Olga; Rómulo sees this as a defeat despite throwing the decision in Refugio's face. Diana confronts Rómulo for the disappearance of all her money, he disclaims all responsibility. Mundo is tired of his boss's suspicions and demands that he allow him to help or carry out his threats. Mundo discovers that Pablo's associates are about to arrive and prepares his revenge to finally save his family from Los hermanos mayores. The doctor informs Fernanda that her son is not responding as expected and that for the moment his condition is critical.
212	100	"Soy hombre muerto"	13 January 2023	2.9
Olga questions Rómulo about the alleged dealings he has pending with the judge who handled the custody appeal. Mundo takes advantage of the visit of the Hermanos mayores to blow up the warehouse. Germán warns Rómulo that now that the Hermanos mayores are dead, he no longer needs to consider his offer and will go after him. Germán visits Refugio to tell her that there are no survivors of the explosion; Refugio concludes that Mundo is dead. Agustín warns Rómulo that he knows all about his lies and finances; Rómulo is unaware that he is being recorded.
213	101	"Edmundo Chavero murió"	16 January 2023	2.8
Fernanda insists to Olga that Petita cannot stay out of school and they discuss what is best for her. Agustín tries to calm Olga but she tells that she only married him to get Petita back. Petita looks for Rómulo for answers about Patricio but he is negligent. Rómulo visits Refugio, leaving her concerned with the comments he throws around about Petita. Petita appears before Rómulo with suitcases in hand and warns him that she will return to Refugio's house.
214	102	"¡Estás vivo!"	17 January 2023	2.6
Lucero hears how even Julieta struggles with the pain of Mundo's death, she takes courage to carry on for her daughter. Diana complains to Refugio for stealing her children, Refugio explodes against her and tells her everything she had been holding back. Fernanda returns Petita to Olga's house and when she sees Olga, she complains to her for having left Petita in the street and threatens to fight again for her custody. Lucero and Refugio are surprised to see Mundo, confirming their suspicions that he was not dead.
215	103	"No tientes al diablo"	18 January 2023	2.8
Nacho, with Renato's help, plans a romantic evening for Eréndira in which he proposes to her; she accepts. After failing to check in with her children, Diana calls them with the news that she has entered a detoxification clinic to make them proud. Agustín summons Bátiz and Ulloa to ask them to testify against Rómulo; he offers them consideration for having confessed. Germán visits Rómulo to try to extract a confession of some of his crimes, although Rómulo does not give in, Germán does not leave empty-handed.
216	104	"Nos vemos en el infierno"	19 January 2023	2.8
Agustín gets fed up with Olga's complaints and mood swings and asks for a divorce; Olga believes it is only about money. Nacho asks Eréndida to go ahead with the wedding plans; not wanting to work things out, they decide to call off the engagement. Rómulo confronts Úlloa for his shady intentions and threatens to kill him; Agustín arrives just in time to save him. Rómulo convinces Olga to fight for full custody of Petita.
217	105	"Sentenciado a un año"	20 January 2023	2.8
Germán warns Mundo that the judge has already sentenced him for having worked with the Hermanos Mayores; he will pay with a year of community service. To convince him to hand over all the evidence against Rómulo, Ulloa offers Agustín to clean up his criminal record along with an extensive recommendation from him. Germán shows the Chavero brothers the evidence he has gathered against Rómulo; they realize they will need Agustín's support.
218	106	"Atacar donde menos se lo esperan"	23 January 2023	2.9
Nacho brags to Mundo about having received a job offer in Puebla, Eréndira overhears him. Rómulo surprises Fernanda, threatens her and takes the opportunity to send a message to Germán. After threatening Fernanda, Rómulo realizes that he could use all of Refugio's grandchildren to protect himself from her and thus achieve his perfect revenge. Agustín informs Bátiz and Ulloa that the account in the Cayman Islands has run out of funds, ruining their plans to collect the outstanding debt.
219	107	"Tu padre no es quien crees"	24 January 2023	2.6
Now that Mundo, Nacho and Petita decide to go to different places, Refugio feels she has lost her purpose. Ulloa visits Rómulo to demand evidence about the whereabouts of his money, Olga hears the threats and the illicit business in which they are involved. Diana returns rehabilitated and repentant for the way she treated the Renato and Rebeca, she offers an apology to Rebeca for not having supported her from the beginning. Agustín shows Olga and Germán the video he took of Rómulo attacking Patricio to kill him. Not wanting to see Rómulo, Olga arrives home and locks herself in her room and takes a large amount of pills before going to sleep.
220	108	"Le esperan años en prisión"	25 January 2023	3.1
Agustín learns that Olga self-medicated to be able to sleep, he asks her not to do it again since he will need her help to catch Rómulo. Mundo prepares for his professional exam as a doctor but fears that a teacher who rejected him will be one of his examiners. Germán arrives at Olga's house with an arrest warrant for Rómulo; he manages to escape using Olga as a hostage. Eréndira surprises Nacho with a marriage proposal in front of his family and friends, he accepts. Rómulo demands that Refugio transfer Mercedes' inheritance in exchange for Petita, Olga reveals that he was Patricio's murderer.
221	109	"El final de Rómulo Ancira"	26 January 2023	3.3
Romulo admits to having orchestrated Julian's death to remove anyone who might interfere with his release from prison. Agustín reveals to Rómulo the reasons why he betrayed him and gives him one last chance, but ends up killing him. After the confrontation with Rómulo, Refugio realizes that she has lost her sight due to high blood pressure. Olga confesses to Refugio that despite wanting to flee back to Spain, she cannot because she would not abandon her loved ones again. Juan Carlos visits Refugio to confess his feelings for her.
222	110	"El amor más puro"	27 January 2023	3.4
The doctor warns Refugio that something could go wrong with her surgery, Refugio warns her children of her wishes. After undergoing surgery, the doctor tells Refugio to take her recovery carefully, she is glad to see her children again. Olga visits Agustín in prison, he tells Olga that his lawyer will try to reduce his sentence. Diana asks Refugio to take care of Rebeca and Renato while she finishes her recovery, because she fears losing them again. Nacho and Eréndira get married. The Chavero family revisits the cathedral to give thanks for the blessings and the strength to face the difficulties.
