= Daniela Álvarez (model) =

Mexican beauty pageant titleholder (born 1993)

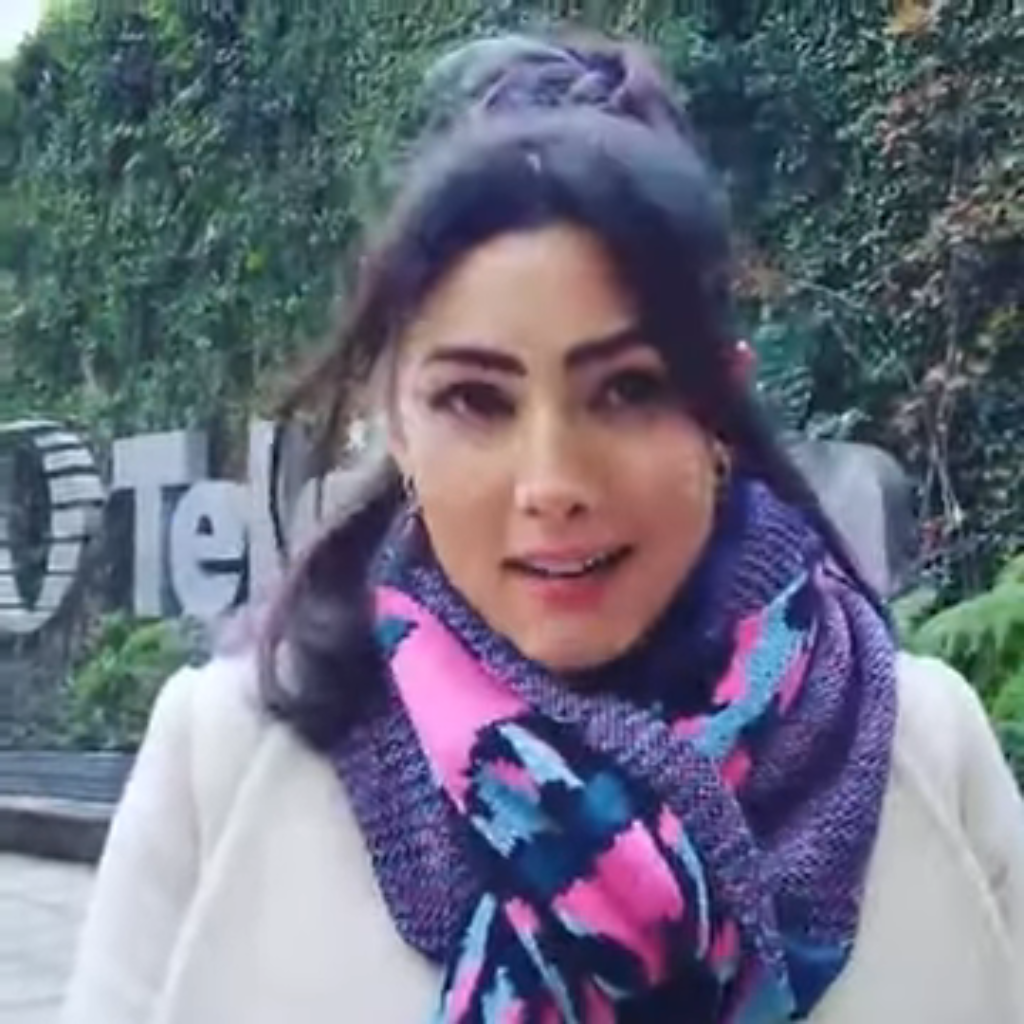
- Álvarez in 2021
- Born: Daniela Álvarez Reyes; October 23, 1993 (age 32); San Luis Potosí, Mexico
- Beauty pageant titleholder
- Title: Nuestra Belleza Morelos 2013; Nuestra Belleza Mundo México 2013
- Hair color: Brown
- Eye color: Hazel
- Major competitions: Nuestra Belleza Morelos 2013 (Winner); Nuestra Belleza Mundo México 2013 (Winner); Miss World 2014 (Top 11)

Daniela Álvarez Reyes (born October 23, 1993) is a Mexican actress and beauty pageant titleholder who won the title of "Nuestra Belleza Mundo México" at the Nuestra Belleza México 2013 pageant. She is the second woman from Morelos to win the Nuestra Belleza Mundo title after Blanca Soto took it in 1997. She represented Mexico at the Miss World 2014 Beauty Pageant held on December 14, 2014, in London, United Kingdom where she was a semifinalist in the Top 10.

== Telenovelas ==
Year	Title	Role	Notes
2016	Pasión y poder	Yemilé	
2017	En tierras salvajes	Regina Negrete	
2018-19	Por amar sin ley	Fernanda "Fer" Álvarez	
2020-21	La mexicana y el güero	Viiyéri Neiya Robles	
2021	Diseñando tu amor	María José "Majo" Arriaga / Judith Arriaga	
2022-23	Corona de lágrimas	Eréndira Márquez	Season 2
2023	Nadie como tú	Jazmín Figueroa Toledano	
2024	Fugitivas, en busca de la libertad	Lorena Martínez "La Martillo"	
2026	Los encantos del sinvergüenza	Morgana	Main cast

== See also ==
- List of people from Morelos

Awards and achievements
Preceded by Marilyn Chagoya	Nuestra Belleza Mundo México; 2013	Succeeded by Yamelin Ramírez
