= List of Televisa telenovelas and series (2010s) =

The following is a list of telenovelas produced by Televisa in the 2010s.

== Years ==
No. (Note: This is only a stipulation of telenovelas and series produced by Televisa in the decade of 2010, it should not be taken as a total number confirmed by Televisa.)	Title	Producer	Season	Original release		Network (Note: The network where the production was first broadcast is shown.)	Ref.
No.	Title	Producer	Season	First aired	Last aired	Network	Ref.
=== 2010 ===
1	Zacatillo, un lugar en tu corazón	Lucero Suárez	1 season, 130 episodes	1 February 2010	30 July 2010	Canal de las Estrellas	
2	Niña de mi corazón	Pedro Damián	1 season, 90 episodes	8 March 2010	9 July 2010	Canal de las Estrellas	
3	Soy tu dueña	Nicandro Díaz González	1 season, 146 episodes	19 April 2010	7 November 2010	Canal de las Estrellas	
4	Llena de amor	Angelli Nesma Medina	1 season, 206 episodes	3 May 2010	13 February 2011	Canal de las Estrellas	
5	Cuando me enamoro	Carlos Moreno	1 season, 181 episodes	5 July 2010	13 May 2011	Canal de las Estrellas	
6	Para volver a amar	Various: Roberto Gómez Fernández; Giselle González	1 season, 146 episodes	12 July 2010	30 January 2011	Canal de las Estrellas	
7	Teresa	José Alberto Castro	1 season, 152 episodes	2 August 2010	27 February 2011	Canal de las Estrellas	
8	Triunfo del amor	Salvador Mejía	1 season, 176 episodes	25 October 2010	26 June 2011	Canal de las Estrellas	
=== 2011 ===
9	Rafaela	Nathalie Lartilleux	1 season, 120 episodes	31 January 2011	15 July 2011	Canal de las Estrellas	
10	Como dice el dicho	Genovena Martínez	14 seasons, 1120 episodes	1 February 2011	31 January 2025	Las Estrellas	
11	Una familia con suerte	Juan Osorio	1 season, 266 episodes	14 February 2011	19 February 2012	Canal de las Estrellas	
12	Ni contigo ni sin ti	Mapat L. de Zatarain	1 season, 130 episodes	28 February 2011	26 August 2011	Canal de las Estrellas	
13	La fuerza del destino	Rosy Ocampo	1 season, 101 episodes	14 March 2011	31 July 2011	Canal de las Estrellas	
14	Dos hogares	Emilio Larrosa	1 season, 150 episodes	27 June 2011	20 January 2012	Canal de las Estrellas	
15	Esperanza del corazón	Luis de Llano Macedo	1 season, 145 episodes	18 July 2011	3 February 2012	Canal de las Estrellas	
16	La que no podía amar	José Alberto Castro	1 season, 166 episodes	1 August 2011	18 March 2012	Canal de las Estrellas	
17	Amorcito corazón	Lucero Suárez	1 season, 206 episodes	29 August 2011	10 June 2012	Canal de las Estrellas	
=== 2012 ===
18	Abismo de pasión	Angelli Nesma Medina	1 season, 161 episodes	23 January 2012	2 September 2012	Canal de las Estrellas	
19	Un refugio para el amor	Ignacio Sada Madero	1 season, 165 episodes	6 February 2012	23 September 2012	Canal de las Estrellas	
20	Por ella soy Eva	Rosy Ocampo	1 season, 166 episodes	20 February 2012	7 October 2012	Canal de las Estrellas	
21	Amor bravío	Carlos Moreno	1 season, 166 episodes	5 March 2012	21 October 2012	Canal de las Estrellas	
22	Cachito de cielo	Various: Roberto Gómez Fernández; Giselle González	1 season, 110 episodes	11 June 2012	9 November 2012	Canal de las Estrellas	
23	Amores verdaderos	Nicandro Díaz González	1 season, 181 episodes	3 September 2012	12 May 2013	Canal de las Estrellas	
24	Corona de lágrimas	José Alberto Castro	2 seasons, 222 episodes	24 September 2012	27 January 2023	Canal de las Estrellas	
25	Porque el amor manda	Juan Osorio	1 season, 181 episodes	8 October 2012	16 June 2013	Canal de las Estrellas	
26	Qué bonito amor	Salvador Mejía	1 season, 161 episodes	22 October 2012	2 June 2013	Canal de las Estrellas	
27	¿Quién eres tú?	Hugo León Ferrer	1 season, 120 episodes	12 November 2012	6 May 2013	Telemicro	
28	La mujer del Vendaval	Mapat L. de Zatarain	1 season, 166 episodes	22 November 2012	30 June 2013	Canal de las Estrellas	
=== 2013 ===
29	Corazón indomable	Nathalie Lartilleux	1 season, 161 episodes	25 February 2013	6 October 2013	Canal de las Estrellas	
30	Las Bandidas	Various	1 season, 120 episodes	3 April 2013	3 September 2013	Televen	
31	La Tempestad	Salvador Mejía Alejandre	1 season, 121 episodes	13 May 2013	27 October 2013	Canal de las Estrellas	
32	Mentir para Vivir	Rosy Ocampo	1 season, 101 episodes	3 June 2013	20 October 2013	Canal de las Estrellas	
33	Libre para amarte	Emilio Larrosa	1 season, 106 episodes	17 June 2013	10 November 2013	Canal de las Estrellas	
34	De que te quiero, te quiero	Lucero Suárez	1 season, 186 episodes	1 July 2013	16 March 2014	Canal de las Estrellas	
35	La Madame	Hugo León Ferrer	1 season, 37 episodes	26 August 2013	31 October 2013	UniMás	
36	Por siempre mi amor	Ignacio Sada Madero	1 season, 151 episodes	7 October 2013	4 May 2014	Canal de las Estrellas	
37	Quiero amarte	Carlos Moreno	1 season, 161 episodes	21 October 2013	1 June 2014	Canal de las Estrellas	
38	Lo que la vida me robó	Angelli Nesma Medina	1 season, 196 episodes	28 October 2013	27 June 2014	Canal de las Estrellas	
39	Qué pobres tan ricos	Rosy Ocampo	1 season, 166 episodes	11 November 2013	29 June 2014	Canal de las Estrellas	
=== 2014 ===
40	La viuda negra	Hugo León Ferrer	2 seasons, 144 episodes	23 February 2014	23 June 2016	UniMás	
41	La virgen de la calle	Rodolfo Hoyos	1 season, 120 episodes	3 March 2014	29 August 2014	Televen	
42	El color de la pasión	Roberto Gómez Fernández	1 season, 122 episodes	17 March 2014	31 August 2014	Canal de las Estrellas	
43	La Gata	Nathalie Lartilleux	1 season, 121 episodes	5 May 2014	19 October 2014	Canal de las Estrellas	
44	La malquerida	José Alberto Castro	1 season, 116 episodes	2 June 2014	9 November 2014	Canal de las Estrellas	
45	Mi corazón es tuyo	Juan Osorio	1 season, 176 episodes	30 June 2014	1 March 2015	Canal de las Estrellas	
46	Hasta el fin del mundo	Nicandro Díaz González	1 season, 191 episodes	28 July 2014	19 April 2015	Canal de las Estrellas	
47	Yo no creo en los hombres	Giselle González	1 season, 121 episodes	1 September 2014	15 February 2015	Canal de las Estrellas	
48	El Chivo	Madeleine Contreras	1 season, 70 episodes	23 September 2014	31 December 2014	UniMás	
49	Muchacha italiana viene a casarse	Pedro Damián	1 season, 176 episodes	20 October 2014	21 June 2015	Canal de las Estrellas	
50	La sombra del pasado	Mapat L. de Zatarain	1 season, 136 episodes	10 November 2014	17 May 2015	Canal de las Estrellas	
=== 2015 ===
51	Que te perdone Dios	Angelli Nesma Medina	1 season, 123 episodes	23 January 2015	10 July 2015	Univision	
52	Amores con trampa	Emilio Larrosa	1 season, 126 episodes	2 March 2015	23 August 2015	Canal de las Estrellas	
53	Señorita Pólvora	Daniel Ucros	1 season, 70 episodes	16 March 2015	18 June 2015	TNT Latin America	
54	Lo imperdonable	Salvador Mejía Alejandre	1 season, 121 episodes	20 April 2015	4 October 2015	Canal de las Estrellas	
55	La vecina	Lucero Suárez	1 season, 176 episodes	25 May 2015	24 January 2016	Canal de las Estrellas	
56	Amor de barrio	Roberto Hernández Vázquez	1 season, 111 episodes	8 June 2015	8 November 2015	Canal de las Estrellas	
57	A que no me dejas	Carlos Moreno	1 season, 141 episodes	27 July 2015	7 February 2016	Canal de las Estrellas	
58	Antes muerta que Lichita	Rosy Ocampo	1 season, 131 episodes	24 August 2015	21 June 2016	Canal de las Estrellas	
59	Pasión y poder	José Alberto Castro	1 season, 136 episodes	5 October 2015	10 April 2016	Canal de las Estrellas	
60	El Dandy	Various	1 season, 70 episodes	26 October 2015	9 March 2016	TNT Latin America	
61	Simplemente María	Ignacio Sada Madero	1 season, 126 episodes	9 November 2015	1 May 2016	Canal de las Estrellas	
=== 2016 ===
62	El hotel de los secretos	Roberto Gómez Fernández	1 season, 80 episodes	25 January 2016	20 May 2016	Univision	
63	Un camino hacia el destino	Nathalie Lartilleux	1 season, 125 episodes	25 January 2016	17 July 2016	Canal de las Estrellas	
64	Corazón que miente	Mapat L. de Zatarain	1 season, 70 episodes	8 February 2016	14 May 2016	Canal de las Estrellas	
65	Sueño de amor	Juan Osorio	1 season, 131 episodes	22 February 2016	21 August 2016	Canal de las Estrellas	
66	Yago	Carmen Armendáriz	1 season, 65 episodes	2 May 2016	5 September 2016	Univision	
67	Las amazonas	Salvador Mejía Alejandre	1 season, 61 episodes	16 May 2016	7 August 2016	Canal de las Estrellas	
68	Tres veces Ana	Angelli Nesma Medina	1 season, 102 episodes	23 May 2016	24 October 2016	Univision	
69	Por siempre Joan Sebastian	Carla Estrada	1 season, 18 episodes	27 June 2016	25 July 2016	Univision	
70	Despertar contigo	Pedro Damián	1 season, 121 episodes	8 August 2016	22 January 2017	Las Estrellas	
71	Vino el amor	José Alberto Castro	1 season, 141 episodes	8 August 2016	19 February 2017	Las Estrellas	
72	Mujeres de negro	Carlos Moreno	1 season, 51 episodes	22 August 2016	30 October 2016	Las Estrellas	
73	Blue Demon	Various	3 seasons, 65 episodes	11 November 2016	14 April 2017	Blim	
74	La candidata	Giselle González	1 season, 61 episodes	21 November 2016	12 February 2017	Las Estrellas	
=== 2017 ===
75	Mi adorable maldición	Ignacio Sada Madero	1 season, 121 episodes	23 January 2017	9 July 2017	Las Estrellas	
76	El Bienamado	Nicandro Díaz González	1 season, 96 episodes	23 January 2017	4 June 2017	Las Estrellas	
77	La doble vida de Estela Carrillo	Rosy Ocampo	1 season, 72 episodes	13 February 2017	23 May 2017	Las Estrellas	
78	Enamorándome de Ramón	Lucero Suárez	1 season, 116 episodes	20 February 2017	30 July 2017	Las Estrellas	
79	Sincronía	Gustavo Loza	1 season, 13 episodes	1 March 2017		Blim	
80	Las 13 esposas de Wilson Fernández		1 season, 13 episodes	12 May 2017		Blim	
81	Mi marido tiene familia	Juan Osorio	2 seasons, 269 episodes	5 June 2017	24 February 2019	Las Estrellas	
82	El vuelo de la victoria	Nathalie Lartilleux	1 season, 89 episodes	10 July 2017	12 November 2017	Las Estrellas	
83	En tierras salvajes	Salvador Mejía Alejandre	1 season, 70 episodes	31 July 2017	5 November 2017	Las Estrellas	
84	Caer en tentación	Giselle González	1 season, 102 episodes	18 September 2017	11 February 2018	Las Estrellas	
85	Érase una vez	Various	1 season, 12 episodes	2 October 2017		Blim	
86	Papá a toda madre	Eduardo Meza	1 season, 103 episodes	22 October 2017	11 March 2018	Las Estrellas	
87	Dogma	Various	1 season, 13 episodes	1 November 2017		Blim	
88	Me declaro culpable	Angelli Nesma Medina	1 season, 62 episodes	6 November 2017	28 January 2018	Las Estrellas	
89	Sin tu mirada	Ignacio Sada Madero	1 season, 112 episodes	13 November 2017	15 April 2018	Las Estrellas	
=== 2018 ===
90	Por amar sin ley	José Alberto Castro	2 season, 183 episodes	12 February 2018	5 July 2019	Las Estrellas	
91	Hijas de la luna	Nicandro Díaz González	1 season, 82 episodes	19 February 2018	10 June 2018	Las Estrellas	
92	Tenías que ser tú	Mapat L. de Zatarain	1 season, 87 episodes	12 March 2018	8 July 2018	Las Estrellas	
93	Y mañana será otro día	Carlos Moreno	1 season, 77 episodes	16 April 2018	29 July 2018	Las Estrellas	
94	La jefa del campeón	Roberto Gomez Fernandez	1 season, 63 episodes	11 June 2018	2 September 2018	Las Estrellas	
95	Like	Pedro Damián	1 season, 97 episodes	10 September 2018	20 January 2019	Las Estrellas	
96	Sin miedo a la verdad	Rubén Galindo	3 seasons, 81 episodes	8 October 2018	TBA	Las Estrellas	
=== 2019 ===
97	Ringo	Lucero Suárez	1 season, 82 episodes	21 January 2019	12 May 2019	Las Estrellas	
98	Silvia Pinal, frente a ti	Carla Estrada	1 season, 21 episodes	24 February 2019	22 March 2019	Las Estrellas	
99	Doña Flor y sus dos maridos	Eduardo Meza	1 season, 65 episodes	25 March 2019	21 June 2019	Las Estrellas	
100	La reina soy yo	Harold Sánchez	1 season, 78 episodes	13 May 2019	30 August 2019	Univision	
101	Esta historia me suena	Genoveva Martínez	6 seasons, 168 episodes	13 May 2019	18 August 2023	Las Estrellas	
102	El corazón nunca se equivoca	Juan Osorio	1 season, 26 episodes	26 June 2019	26 July 2019	Las Estrellas	
103	Los elegidos	Andrés Santamaría	1 season, 34 episodes	1 July 2019	16 August 2019	Las Estrellas	
104	Cita a ciegas	Pedro Ortiz de Pinedo	1 season, 70 episodes	29 July 2019	1 November 2019	Las Estrellas	
105	La usurpadora	Carmen Armendáriz	1 season, 25 episodes	2 September 2019	4 October 2019	Las Estrellas	
106	El Dragón: El regreso de un guerrero	Carlos Bardasano	2 seasons, 82 episodes	4 October 2019	20 January 2020	Netflix	
107	Cuna de lobos	Giselle González	1 season, 25 episodes	7 October 2019	8 November 2019	Las Estrellas	
108	Soltero con hijas	Juan Osorio	1 season, 86 episodes	28 October 2019	23 February 2020	Las Estrellas	
109	Médicos	José Alberto Castro	1 season, 87 episodes	11 November 2019	8 March 2020	Las Estrellas	
