= Victoria Orvañanos =

Mexican screenwriter

- Born: Victoria Sofía Orvañanos Archer; October 31, 1981 (age 44); Mexico City, Mexico
- Education: University of California, Los Angeles
- Occupation: Screenwriter
- Known for: Dogma; En Tierras Salvajes; Las Amazonas; Esperanza Del Corazón; Nueva Vida

Victoria Orvañanos (born October 31, 1981, Mexico City) is a Mexican screenwriter known for her work in Mexican television shows such as Dogma, En Tierras Salvajes, Las Amazonas, and Esperanza Del Corazón.

== Early life and education ==
Orvañanos was born on October 31, 1981, in Mexico City, Mexico, to Julio Orvañanos Alatorre, a publicist, and a British-Mexican mother, Victoria Archer Cuillery. Her father introduced her to film and TV production at an early age.

She studied at Colegio Regina, a Catholic school of nuns in Mexico City, and St. Mary's School in England. She then went to study screenwriting and film scoring at the University of California, Los Angeles (UCLA). She then attended Columbia University.

== Career ==
Orvañanos began her career with Televisa, a Mexican television broadcasting company, where she worked from 2008 to 2018. During this time, she wrote several telenovelas that aired globally and collaborated with various producers including Luis De Llano and Salvador Mejía, to write Las Amazonas, Nueva Vida, Esperanza Del Corazón, and En Tierras Salvajes in collaboration with the Spanish television production company Bambú Productions (Velvet, Cable Girls).

During this time, Orvañanos also worked at Alazraki Entertainment with Gaz Alazraki and Moisés Chiver, where she met Leonardo Zimbrón (producer of Netflix's Club de Cuervos). The two worked alongside Mónica Vargas for Traziende Films to write Dogma, Mexico's first supernatural mystery TV series, which aired in November 2017 in Latin America for Televisa.

Orvañanos also runs a non-profit organization, Levantemos a México, which teaches art skills to children in street situations. The organization launched a photography exposition titled Black & White at the National Museum of Art in Mexico City (MUNAL).

== Personal life ==
Orvañanos is a singer and plays the violin, guitar, bass, and piano. She lives in Mexico City, Los Angeles, and New York City.
