= Liliana Abud =

Mexican actress and telenovela writer

- Born: July 5, 1948 (age 77); Xalapa, Veracruz, Mexico
- Occupations: Actress, screenwriter
- Spouse: Alfonso Rendón
- Children: 2

Liliana Abud (born July 5, 1948) is a Mexican actress and writer. She is known for her work in telenovelas and Mexican cinema. The majority of her work in both acting and writing has been with the Mexican television company Televisa.

== Career ==
Liliana Abud had a successful acting career starting in 1975 and continuing for over a decade before she decided to transition to screenwriting. In an interview, Abud said that she wanted to be part of the creative process instead of in front of a camera. Abud has continued to act occasionally, with her most recent role in 2019. One of Abud's most notable acting roles was that of Raquel Rodríguez, the protagonist of the popular American educational television program Destinos.

Abud is a prolific screenwriter of telenovelas, beginning her writing career in 1986 and writing for over 20 shows. In the late 1980s, she cowrote the screenplay of Cicatrices del alma with Eric Vonn and submitted it to one of Televisa's TV pilot contests, where it won third place and was eventually produced in 1986. After taking a break in 2013, Abud returned to work as a writer in 2017 on En tierras salvajes.

She has expressed that she believes in the quote "there are no bad actors, there are only bad scripts."

After transitioning to screenwriting for telenovelas in 1986, Abud gained success writing original scripts, as well as remakes and adaptations. As a writer, Abud was immersed in the telenovela industry and was close with other professionals like Ernesto Alonso, who was her mentor. She has also worked closely with producers like Salvador Mejía as the head writer on projects like Rosalinda and Abrázame muy fuerte.

== Personal life ==
Abud was born in Xalapa, Veracruz. She has said that she comes from a family of writers, including her uncle, who is the notable Mexican poet and writer Rafael Solana.

Abud has a degree in psychology from the University of Veracruz and has credited it with her skill in character writing.

Abud is married to Alfonso Rendón. They have two children, Alfonso and Paula Rendón, the latter of whom is also a producer and actress, and who worked with her mother on Destinos.

== Filmography ==
=== Acting ===
Film performances
Year	Title	Role	Notes
1992	Íntimo terror		
1988	Vieja moralidad	Benedicta	
1986	La dama o el león		
1986	La doncella sabia		
1986	El gato con botas		
1986	Hanzel y Gretel		
1986	El niño que quiso temblar		
1986	Rapunsell		
1986	El rey Midas		
1986	El ruiseñor chino		

Telenovela performances
Year	Title	Role	Notes
2019	Julia vs. Julia	Carmen Montemayor	
1989	Mi segunda madre	Sonia	
1987	Rosa salvaje	Cándida Linares	
1986	Herencia maldita	Clara Velarde	
1985	Tú o nadie	Camila Lombardo	
1983	Un solo corazón	Maria	
1982	Gabriel y Gabriela	Martha	
1981	Una limosna de amor	Daniela	
1980	Colorina	Alba de Almazán	
1980	La divina Sarah	Lysiana Bernhardt	
1980	Espejismo	Susana	
1979	Amor prohibido	Silva	
1979	Añoranza		1 episode
1978	Cartas para una víctima		
1978	Gotita de gente	Martha Rivera Valdes	

USA Television performances
Year	Title	Role	Notes
1992	Destinos	Raquel Rodríguez	

=== Screenwriting ===
Original writing
Year	Title	Company	Notes
2005-2006	Barrera de amor	Televisa	
2005	La esposa virgen	Televisa	Based on the work of Caridad Bravo Adams
2004	Amarte es mi pecado	Televisa	
2002	La otra	Televisa	
1993	Los Parientes Pobres	Televisa	
1991	Atrapada	Televisa	Cowritten with Carmen Daniels
1988	Amor en silencio	Televisa	Cowritten with Eric Vonn
1986-1987	Cicatrices del alma	Televisa	Cowritten with Eric Vonn and Lindy Giacoman

Adaptations
Year	Title	Company	Notes
2017	En tierras salvajes	Televisa	Cowritten with Katia Rodríguez and Victoria Orvañanos
2015	A que no me dejas	Televisa	
2015	Que te perdone Dios	Televisa	
2010-2011	Triunfo Del Amor	Televisa	
2009	Corazón salvaje	Televisa	
2008	Fuego en la sangre	Televisa	
2006	Mundo de Fieras	Televisa	
2005	La madrastra	Televisa	
2003	Mariana de la noche	Televisa	
2002	Entre el amor y el odio	Televisa	
2000	Abrázame muy fuerte	Televisa	
1999	Rosalinda	Televisa	
1998	El privilegio de amar	Televisa	Cowritten with Ricardo Fiallega and Marta Jurado
1997	La antorcha encendida	Televisa	
1996	El vuelo del águila	Televisa	
1990	Yo compro esa mujer	Televisa	

== Awards and nominations ==
=== Premios TVyNovelas ===
Year	Category	Work	Result
2012	Best Writing or Adaptation	Triunfo del amor	Nominated
2009	Best Story or Adaptation	Fuego en la sangre	Nominated
2001	Best Story or Adaptation	Abrázame muy fuerte	Won
1989	Best Story or Adaptation	Amor en silencio	Won
1987	Best Writer	Cicatrices del alma	Nominated
1986	Best Young Lead Actress	Tú o nadie	Nominated

=== Sogen Presea Caridad Bravo Adams ===
Year	Category	Result
2016	Literary Career	Won

=== TV Adicto Golden Awards ===
Year	Category	Work	Result
2010	Best Original Story	Amarte es mi pecado	Won
2010	Best Remake	La Madrastra	Won
2009	Mejores libretos	Fuego en la sangre	Won
2007	Mejores libretos	Barrera de amor	Won
1999	Mejor adaptación	El privilegio de amar	Won

=== Califa de Oro Awards ===
Year	Category	Work	Result
1999	Best Adaptation	El privilegio de amar	Won
