= Pinches famosos =

- Genre: Television show
- Presented by: Arlette Foglia; Georgina Carrasco
- Country of origin: Mexico
- Original language: Spanish
- No. of seasons: 2
- No. of episodes: 16

Production
- Production company: Televisa

Original release
- Network: Las Estrellas
- Release: 14 August 2019 – present

Pinches famosos is a Mexican show that premiered on Las Estrellas website on 14 August 2019. The show is presented by Arlette Foglia, chef and health coach, and Georgina Carrasco, pastry chef and enterprising. The show consists of invading the house of Mexican stars and preparing a dish with the ingredients they get in his house. The first consists of 15 episodes.

== Episodes ==
=== Season 1 (2019) ===
No. overall	No. in season	Guest stars	Original release date
1	1	"Gabriel Soto"	14 August 2019
2	2	"Cassandra Sánchez Navarro"	21 August 2019
3	3	"José Ron"	28 August 2019
4	4	"Carmen Salinas"	4 September 2019
5	5	"Juan Martín Jáuregui"	11 September 2019
6	6	"Lambda García"	18 September 2019
7	7	"Ximena Córdoba"	25 September 2019
