= Mónica Vargas Celis =

Mexican film and television producer

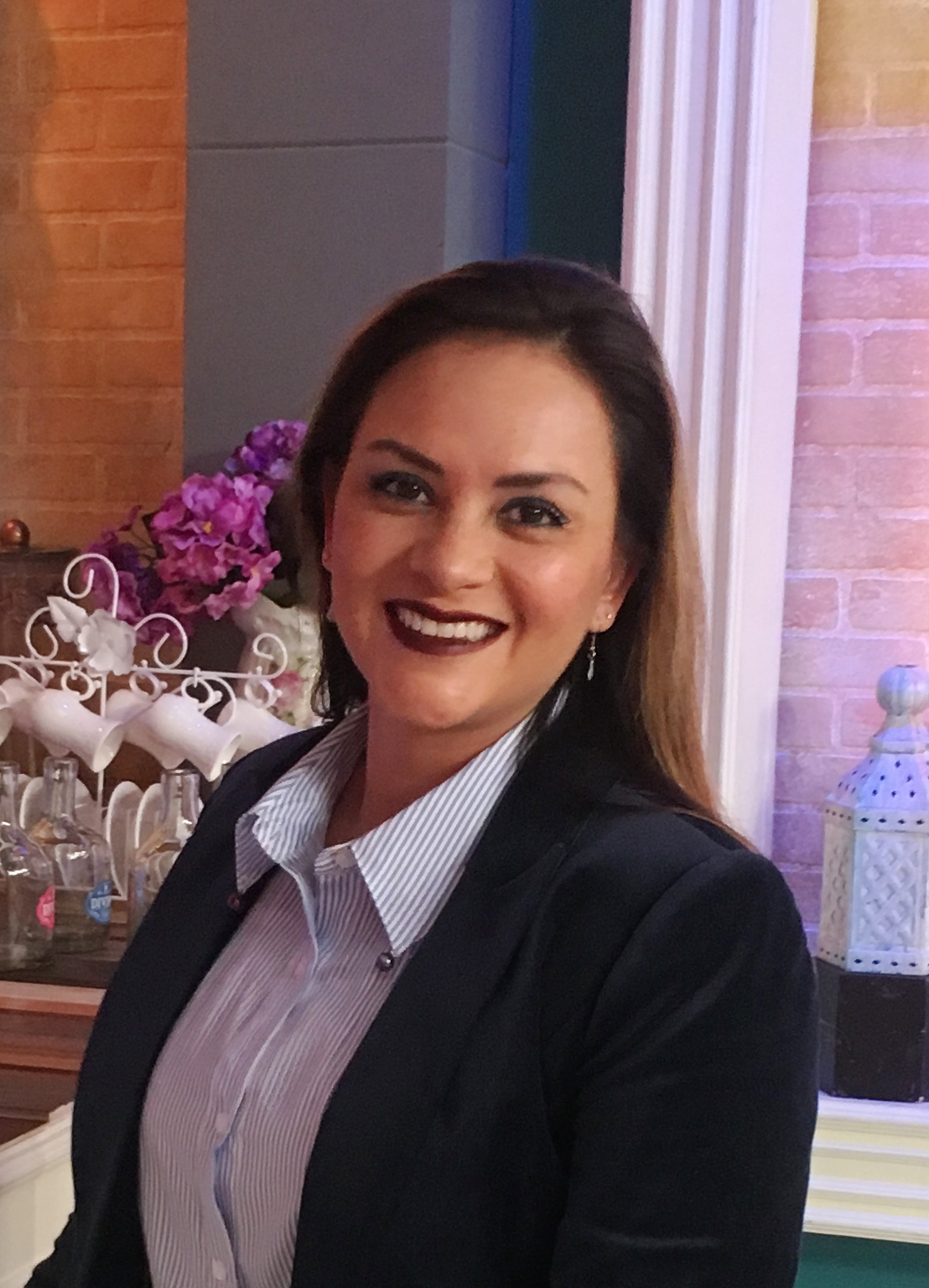
- Education: Universidad Anáhuac México
- Occupations: Film and television producer
- Notable work: Club de Cuervos

Mónica Vargas Celis is a Mexican film and television producer. She has produced more than ten feature films, including American Curious, Como novio de pueblo, How to Break Up with Your Douchebag, and Amor a Primera Visa. She is also a producer of Club de Cuervos, the first Netflix original series in Spanish. Vargas is currently general director of production at Traziende Films, a company she founded with Leonardo Zimbrón in 2000.

== Career ==
Mónica Vargas is a graduate of the Universidad Anáhuac México. She has worked with companies such as Netflix, Warner Bros., Televisa, and 20th Century Fox, and with actors such as Marina de Tavira, Luis Gerardo Méndez, Laura Ramsey, Mariana Treviño, Osvaldo Benavides, Jaime Camil, Jesús Zavala, Irán Castillo, Stockard Channing, Demián Bichir, Sandra Echeverría, and Diego Luna.

She has produced several feature films, including Efectos secundarios (2005), Amor a primera vista (2013), Un caballo llamado elefante (2013), Cómplices (2016), American Curious (2017), Todo mal (2017), Más sabe el diablo por viejo (2017) – a co-production with 20th Century Fox – and How to Break Up with Your Douchebag (2017). The latter became the 12th highest grossing film in the history of Mexico and was distributed in the United States, Peru, and Bolivia. Como novio de pueblo and Mentada de Padre were both released in 2019.

== Television and streaming ==
In partnership with Alazraki Entertainment, Vargas launched the first Netflix original series in Spanish, Club de Cuervos. Its fourth season premiered on January 25, 2019. She also produced the Blim original series Dogma in 2017.

In television, she produced the Televisa program Netas divinas, which is aired weekly by Unicable.

== Awards and nominations ==
- Dogma, nominated for Best Series at the Premios TVyNovelas, 2018
- Netas divinas, nominated for Best Pay-TV Program at the Premios TVyNovelas, 2019

== Filmography ==
=== Series ===
Title	Role	Year	Director	Network
Netas divinas	Producer	2006–present	Various	Televisa
Club de Cuervos	Executive producer	2015–2018	Gary Alazraki	Netflix
Dogma	Executive producer	2017	Carlos Barrera	Blim

=== Films ===
Title	Role	Year	Director
Efectos secundarios	Executive producer	2006	Issa López
Amor a Primera Visa	Producer	2013	Pedro Pablo Ibarra
Todo mal	Producer	2017	Issa López
Cómplices	Producer	2017	Luis Eduardo Reyes
American Curious	Producer	2017	Gabylú Lara
How to Break Up with Your Douchebag	Producer	2017	Gabriela Tagliavini
Todo mal	Producer	2017	Issa López
Un caballo llamado elefante	Co-producer	2017	Andrés Waissbluth
Más Sabe el Diablo por Viejo	Producer	2018	José Bojórquez
Como novio de pueblo	Producer	2019	Joe Rendón
