= Una limosna de amor =

Mexican telenovela

- Genre: Telenovela
- Created by: Original Story: Arturo Moya Grau; Adaptation: Vivian Pestalozzi
- Directed by: Rafael Banquells
- Starring: Liliana Abud; José Alonso; Jorge Ortiz de Pinedo
- Theme music composer: Michelle Guiu
- Opening theme: "Ámame" by Memo Méndez Guiu
- Country of origin: Mexico
- Original language: Spanish
- No. of episodes: 20

Production
- Executive producer: Patricia Lozano
- Cinematography: Karlos Velázquez
- Running time: 30 minutes

Original release
- Network: Canal de las Estrellas
- Release: 1981

Una limosna de amor is a Mexican telenovela produced by Patricia Lozano for Televisa in 1981.

== Cast ==
- Liliana Abud as Daniela
- José Alonso as Luis Alfonso
- Tony Carbajal as Silvio
- Rita Macedo as Emma
- Jorge Ortiz de Pinedo as Leonidas
- Rafael Banquells as Elias
- Luis Uribe as Gerardo
- Amparo Grisales as Julia
- Miguel Suárez as Don Jorge
- Lilia Aragón as Angela
- Raúl Méraz as Mora
- José Carlos Ruiz as Jeremias
- Rosa Furman as Ana
- Gustavo Rojo as Rolando
- Gloria Silva as Prudencia
- Alfonso Iturralde as Raúl
- Francisco del Toro
- Jorge Mateos
- Anabel Ferreira as Patty
