= List of Blue Demon episodes =

Blue Demon is a Spanish-language television series produced by Teleset for Televisa and Sony Pictures Television.

A total of 3 seasons aired.

== Series overview ==
Season	Episodes	Originally released
1	20	November 11, 2016
2	20	February 24, 2017
3	25	April 14, 2017

== Episodes ==
=== Season 1 (2016) ===
Blim released the first season of Blue Demon on November 11, 2016. In the United States, it premiered on UniMás on January 15, 2017 airing Monday through Friday.

No. overall	No. in season	Title	Original release date	U.S. air date	US viewers (millions)
1	1	"Entre el dolor y el amor"	November 11, 2016	January 15, 2017	1.32 (Univision), 0.38 (UniMás)
Blue Demon faces champion Ala Dorada, a duel where rivalry and courage are evident. Blue Demon is ready to win the World Wrestling Championship. This is a fight for honor.
2	2	"Trabajo vs deuda"	November 11, 2016	January 16, 2017	0.44
Alejandro meets Goyita and feels that she is the love of his life. Due to pressure of the debts of his uncle, Alejandro decides to accept the offer of Larrañaga, owner of a place of clandestine fights.
3	3	"Métodos inusuales"	November 11, 2016	January 17, 2017	0.33
Alejandro is very surprised to see his new place of work, there are no rules, there are no techniques, only unusual methods to pay a debt. Later, he has his first fight.
4	4	"Subiendo de nivel"	November 11, 2016	January 18, 2017	0.42
Larrañaga convinces Alejandro that he must raise the level of the fights in order to earn more money. Alejandro recovers his work in the mine, with the condition that he takes the night shift. Tosco has his first fight to pay off the debt.
5	5	"Las deudas nunca se acaban"	November 11, 2016	January 19, 2017	0.31
Larrañaga informs Alejandro that his debt has doubled. In the mine begins a revolt because the miners try to defend their work. The doctor tries to convince Goyita's father to allow her to continue working in the hospital.
6	6	"¿Quién es el responsable?"	November 11, 2016	January 20, 2017	0.31
Alejandro, on hearing of the explosion in the mine, goes to find his uncle without caring about the consequences. El Chaco is worried because he thinks they saw him when he put the explosives. Alejandro must return to fight.
7	7	"Coraje"	November 11, 2016	January 23, 2017	0.24
Alejandro is still under pressure from the debts and tries to get away from the clandestine fights, but the commitment with his family has more weight.
8	8	"Nace un demonio azul"	November 11, 2016	January 24, 2017	0.27
For the first time Alejandro begins his fight without letting his face be seen. He feels motivated and able to beat the strongest opponent. Goyita asks the doctor to intercede for her before the patronage so she won't lose her job.
9	9	"Finiquitando favores"	November 11, 2016	January 25, 2017	0.27
A singular request of Larrañaga puts Alejandro between the sword and the wall. Ignacio must decide who is the best to face a major challenge.
10	10	"Algo turbio se esconde"	November 11, 2016	January 26, 2017	0.28
By orders of the Profe, Alejandro and Carlos face off in the quadrilateral to dispute the position of pair of the champion. Alejandro learns of unknown details about the death of his uncle.
11	11	"Trabajo en equipo"	November 11, 2016	January 27, 2017	0.26
The detective proposes to Alejandro to be his informant to stop Larrañaga. Goyita decides to end her relationship with Alejandro, because she can not accept the fact that he is a wrestler.
12	12	"¿Quién enfrentará al campeón?"	November 11, 2016	January 30, 2017	0.23
In the gym everyone is upset because they learned that Larrañaga is involved in the tournament and they fear that he will buy the victory. Finally, it's time to decide who will fight the invincible "Ala Dorada".
13	13	"Momento de decisiones"	November 11, 2016	January 31, 2017	0.23
After complaining about bad manners in the tournament, Alejandro challenges the Ala Dorada. The doctor asks Goyita to marry him without knowing that someone is listening to them. Carlos looks for comfort in Carmela.
14	14	"¡Vaya sorpresa!"	November 11, 2016	February 1, 2017	0.28
Alejandro will do anything to recover Goyita and is very surprised to find out who Carlos is. Before the refusal to let her train in the gym, Lola agrees to work for Larrañaga, but does not know that she is in serious danger.
15	15	"Siguiendo pistas"	November 11, 2016	February 2, 2017	0.31
Dr. Buelna tells Goyita's father that she rejected his marriage proposal because she is dating Alejandro. Meanwhile, Lieutenant Chavez asks Goyita for help in trying to close an investigation that will take him to Larrañaga.
16	16	"De incógnito"	November 11, 2016	February 3, 2017	0.28
Carlos and Alejandro continue their promotion as fighters, now under the names of Blue Demon and Dark Wind. In the orphanage, a review is carried out to find signs of mistreatment of children.
17	17	"Sin descanso"	November 11, 2016	February 6, 2017	0.23
Larrañaga does not take his finger off the line and follows in the footsteps of Blue Demon and Black Wind. Goyita faces an injustice in the orphanage. Alejandro, without resources and tired of a long day, finds himself with a pleasant surprise.
18	18	"Malas noticias"	November 11, 2016	February 7, 2017	0.28
Alejandro takes his father to the doctor because he has not felt well. Lieutenant Chavez wants to validate his suspicions about Adalberto's disappearance.
19	19	"Visita inesperada"	November 11, 2016	February 9, 2017	0.33
The intentions of revenge of Larrañaga grow every day more. Donato feels the desire to be next to his son and to know the place where it is gestating legend of Blue Demon. In the gym, Alejandro can not believe what is happening.
20	20	"Con las alas al vuelo"	November 11, 2016	February 8, 2017	0.28
Larrañaga wins the battle again. Destiny takes Blue Demon and Black Wind to make important decisions for their careers. The capital awaits and the love of Alejandro and Goyita will undergo a new test.

=== Season 2 (2017) ===
Blim released the second season of Blue Demon on February 24, 2017. In the United States, it premiered on UniMás on March 8, 2017 airing Monday through Friday.

No. overall	No. in season	Title	Original release date	U.S. air date	US viewers (millions)
21	1	"Un solo objetivo"	February 24, 2017	March 8, 2017	0.24
Alejandro and Carlos arrive in Mexico City, each with his own motivations but with only one objective: to win in wrestling. Meanwhile, Goyita, with her new responsibilities in the orphanage, continues to miss Alejandro.
22	2	"Una manita"	February 24, 2017	March 9, 2017	0.24
Blue Demon and Black Wind decide to go their way without the support of the association. Carlos feels desperate and decides to talk to Alejandro about what is happening to him. Blue Demon asks Ala Dorada for help, he accepts but with the condition to face in an unexpected fight.
23	3	"Nueva organización"	February 24, 2017	March 10, 2017	0.20
Alejandro is not in his best condition after the fight, besides he has not been able to talk to Goyita. Blue Demon and Black Wind invite Azucena, El Carnicero, Cavernícola and Paco Tormenta to form a new wrestling organization.
24	4	"¡Basta!"	February 24, 2017	March 13, 2017	0.22
Carlos is tired of the threats of Macumbo and decides to stop him. Alejandro, with the intention of achieving clean fights, creates the Popular Wrestling Association, while Franklin initiates a campaign to support it.
25	5	"Carlos en problemas"	February 24, 2017	March 14, 2017	0.21
Goyita decides to go to see Alejandro and give up the orphanage. Guillén receives a proposal to televise one of his fights. Macumbo is close to accomplishing his threat
26	6	"Júbilo y desgracias"	February 24, 2017	March 15, 2017	0.26
The fight was a success, a new association is born and everyone celebrates. Carlos pleads guilty to the murder of Macumbo. Meanwhile, Alejandro travels to Monterrey in search of Goyita.
27	7	"Ayudando a los jóvenes"	February 24, 2017	March 16, 2017	0.21
Everything is ready to see Ala Dorada on television with Franklin's narration, but not everything goes as expected. Goyita is surprised to see that Alejandro has revived the interest of young people in wrestling. Meanwhile, Franklin is looking for a wrestler to face Lola.
28	8	"¿Quiénes son los mejores?"	February 24, 2017	March 17, 2017	0.15
Silvia confesses to Goyita what happened to Macumbo. Guillén and Franklin will make noise about the association in the media. Blue Demon challenges the association to fight them and define who is the best.
29	9	"La propuesta"	February 24, 2017	March 20, 2017	N/A
Neighborhood fighters are determined not to join Don Mane and continue in the Popular Association. Meanwhile, Alejandro wants to help Carlos and makes a proposal to Carmela. All are waiting for the definitive fight.
30	10	"La boda"	February 24, 2017	March 21, 2017	N/A
Carmela confesses the whole truth about the death of Macumbo. Ala Dorada takes direct action against Don Mane. Between applause and joy, Alejandro and Goyita marry.
31	11	"Una nueva etapa"	February 24, 2017	March 22, 2017	N/A
Ala Dorada and Blue Demon meet and decide to take a turn in wrestling again. Franklin continues to support the fight between Lola and Svetlana. Carlos is on probation and it will not be easy for him to continue his wrestling career.
32	12	"El regreso de Black Wind"	February 24, 2017	March 23, 2017	0.21
Goyita continues her work as a nurse, now with the opportunity to help people. The great moment of Lola vs. Svetlana arrives. Alejandro and the Popular Association press for Carlos to return to show his strength as Black Wind being measured in the arena.
33	13	"El reto"	February 24, 2017	March 27, 2017	N/A
Black Wind accepts the challenge of fighting and measuring against Ala Dorada, both seek to claim. Blue Demon, in defense of Carlos' honor, challenges Ala Dorada to win the precious belt of the world championship.
34	14	"Un punto débil"	February 24, 2017	March 28, 2017	N/A
The fight of the century between Ala Dorada and Blue Demon approaches. Franklin will be the spokesperson for this great event through the radio. Alejandro prepares with the training of Profe Vera, but has a weak point that someone else knows.
35	15	"Un nuevo campeón"	February 24, 2017	March 29, 2017	N/A
Azucena and Butcher note that Guillen is up to something. Goyita offers talks for women, which is not well seen. The big day has arrived and, during the fight, Ala Dorada tries to cheat.
36	16	"No todo es alegría"	February 24, 2017	March 30, 2017	N/A
The time has come to draw accounts and Guillen must honor his commitments with Blue Demon. Not everyone in the neighborhood is sincere about the victory of Blue Demon. Alejandro and Goyita will face an unexpected circumstance.
37	17	"Inmensa tristeza"	February 24, 2017	March 31, 2017	N/A
Goyita is shattered, everything reminds her of her father and does not want the story to be repeated with Alejandro. The sum of several decisions of Guillen makes Blue Demon think that he should change manager, which will not be so easy.
38	18	"Sólo hay uno"	February 24, 2017	April 3, 2017	N/A
Women who wish to vindicate their rights have a great ally. Carlos decides to look for Silvia and ask his forgiveness. Lola takes a step from which she could repent. Guillen is determined to take the name from Blue Demon and he must prove that he is the only one worthy of the blue mask.
39	19	"No todo lo que brilla es oro"	February 24, 2017	April 4, 2017	N/A
Blue Demon is disappointed in Ala Dorada for his behavior in the championship. Carlos has not yet overcome the unpleasant events of his life and has taken a wrong turn. Meanwhile, Goyita receives surprising new news.
40	20	"Devuélvanle el nombre"	February 24, 2017	April 5, 2017	N/A
Blue Demon receives a proposal to make films. In the vicinity, Azucena and Cavernícola refuse to fight until the association returns its name to Blue Demon. Bustos tells Alejandro that he may not like him very much.

=== Season 3 (2017) ===
Blim released the third season of Blue Demon on April 14, 2017. In the United States, it premiered on UniMás on April 6, 2017, however it was still promoted as the second season, and aired Monday through Friday until May 6, 2017 when it was moved to Saturday's

No. overall	No. in season	Title	Original release date	U.S. air date
41	1	"Una nueva propuesta"	April 14, 2017	April 6, 2017
A movie proposal arrives for Blue Demon. In the neighborhood, Azucena and Cavernícola refuse to fight until the association returns its name to Blue. On the other hand, Goyita is attacked because people do not like the talks she gives.
42	2	"Otra disputa"	April 14, 2017	April 7, 2017
Blue Demon is still the most precious jewel for the wrestling association. Guillen makes a new proposal to attract the fighters to the association but Alejandro rejects it. Again, Carlos is determined to beat him in the ring.
43	3	"Lesión vs. secuestro"	April 14, 2017	April 10, 2017
Guillen asks Carlos to harm Blue Demon forever, so he does not fight anymore. When he refuses, he looks for a way to force him, kidnapping his son. So Carlos has no choice but to leave Blue badly injured.
44	4	"Un adiós momentáneo"	April 14, 2017	April 13, 2017
After the fight with Black Wind, Blue was left with serious physical damage that prevented him from fighting again. However, little by little he is recovering, with the support of Goyita. Carlos later demands that Guillen be the champion, as he promised.
45	5	"Polémica pelea"	April 14, 2017	April 17, 2017
Blue Demon is getting better, though not enough to defend his title. The association decides to call a fight to have a new champion, but Blue is determined to recover to get the belt back.
46	6	"Una maravillosa motivación"	April 14, 2017	April 18, 2017
Goyita gives birth to her baby and that motivates Alejandro even more to recover. On the other hand, he is presented with the opportunity to make another film. Later, the fight between Paco Tormenta and Ala Dorada takes place, which ends with a great controversy.
47	7	"Un turbio pasado"	April 14, 2017	April 19, 2017
Alejandro initiates the recordings of the film, but he does everything he can to make the action scenes himself, despite knowing that it is very dangerous because of his state of health. On the other hand, the past is discovered that Azucena never wanted to talk about.
48	8	"Mentira tras mentira"	April 14, 2017	April 20, 2017
At dinner with Maria and Ala Dorada, Goyita realizes that Alejandro lied to him the night that he arrived late after the recording. On the other hand, Carlos manages to obtain the title of champion that wanted so much.
49	9	"Una confesión inesperada"	April 14, 2017	April 21, 2017
Franklin receives a proposal to return to the radio with double the salary. On the other hand, Maria confesses to Blue Demon that she is interested in him. Meanwhile, Goyita is doing very well with her medicine and is about to achieve her dream.
50	10	"Deslumbrado"	April 14, 2017	April 24, 2017
The lights, the glitter of fame make Blue feel excited and different. María Fabela uses the moment very well with Blue. Franklin looks for Madariaga to return to the radio, because he knows that thanks to him he became famous.
51	11	"Desconfianza"	April 14, 2017	April 25, 2017
Goyita has lost confidence in Alejandro. While Fina wants to recover and help Cavernícola. Larrañaga, upon learning of Alejandro's physical improvement, reactivates the plan against him.
52	12	"Reanudar la venganza"	April 14, 2017	April 26, 2017
Larrañaga wants to consummate his revenge to finish with Blue Demon and will look for all means to achieve it. The dreams and goals of Alejandro and Goyita no longer seem to be the same ... so they must make decisions.
53	13	"Sin dejar rastro"	April 14, 2017	April 27, 2017
Maria Fabela is a victim of revenge. Goyita continues her cause to demonstrate that remedies should benefit the villagers. Larrañaga must erase any trace that inculcates him in the assassination attempt to Blue Demon.
54	14	"Dos corazones rotos"	April 14, 2017	April 28, 2017
Two broken hearts: Ala Dorada and Goyita. Blue Demon and Maria Fabela forget the world as their romance progresses. Ala Dorada feels that he has lost the love of Maria Fabela and will not remain with his arms folded. After a night of drinks, Franklin wakes up with a surprise.
55	15	"Siguiendo pistas"	April 14, 2017	May 1, 2017
Blue and Maria Fabela are ready for anything. Detective Quiroga arrives to help Alejandro tie up the events of which he has been a victim. Goyita and Alejandro are moving in different ways.
56	16	"Una nueva amenaza"	April 14, 2017	May 6, 2017
Larrañaga threatens Carlos: he warns that his families can get hurt. Blue Demon and Ala Dorada are unaware of Black Wind's title and will be tested in a new challenge.
57	17	"Mantener el título"	April 14, 2017	May 13, 2017
Black Wind is willing to do anything to keep his title. The Rudos try to distract the results in the ring. Fina fears that the neighborhood will stop being what it has been. While Alejandro shows that he has a good heart.
58	18	"De regreso al ring"	April 14, 2017	May 20, 2017
The big day arrives: Blue Demon and Ala Dorada again face to face. Detective Quiroga does not rest on the search for truth. Meanwhile Goyita decides that she should have some fun with Daniel
59	19	"Buenas y malas noticias"	April 14, 2017	May 27, 2017
Guillén is behind the track of who is really Filemón Cordera. Goyita is disappointed by the televised news and the public announcement of Maria Fabela.
60	20	"Mano negra"	April 14, 2017	June 3, 2017
Detective Quiroga informs Alejandro what happened to Guillén. Wrestlers need a new representative. Azucena is offered for the election, but the hand of Larrañaga is present in the result. Goyita, deep in her heart, keeps the hopes of returning with Alejandro.
61	21	"Cerrando círculos"	April 14, 2017	June 10, 2017
Madariaga manages to make the memories of Ala Dorada, who opens his heart to a story never told before. The cycles are about to close and, before the eyes of the press, Ala Dorada decides to take a step to show himself as it is.
62	22	"Blue Demon vs. Black Wind"	April 14, 2017	June 24, 2017
The big day arrives when Blue Demon and Black Wind are again measured. Ala Dorada in a new role next to Franklin and Madariaga. Goyita shows that she keeps intact her feelings towards Alejandro.
63	23	"Nueva información"	April 14, 2017	July 1, 2017
Azucena, faithful collaborator, is put to the test in a step that is dangerous for her. Quiroga resumes investigations after a new finding, whose key may be in the hands of Alejandro.
64	24	"El engaño"	April 14, 2017	July 8, 2017
Larrañaga, under the name of Filemón Cordera, wishes to keep the fortune of Thomas and will do everything possible to achieve it. The death of Azucena impels Carlos and Alejandro to give a lesson.
65	25	"Corazón de héroe"	April 14, 2017	July 15, 2017
Larrañaga feels very close to the inheritance of the family of his wife Carlota, without imagining that a big surprise awaits him. The day arrives for a new challenge for Blue Demon, who must face a future fighter: Bruma Tóxica. Mask against mask, Blue shows that behind the muscles of a hero, is the heart of a great man.
