= Cartas para una víctima =

- Genre: Telenovela
- Created by: Original Story: Ada Campobello
- Directed by: Alfredo Saldaña
- Starring: Julissa; José Alonso
- Country of origin: Mexico
- Original language: Spanish
- No. of episodes: 18

Production
- Executive producer: Ernesto Alonso
- Cinematography: Alfredo Saldaña

Original release
- Network: Canal de las Estrellas
- Release: 1978

Cartas para una víctima (English: Letters For a Victim) is a Mexican telenovela produced by Ernesto Alonso for Televisa in 1978.

== Cast ==
- Julissa
- José Alonso
- Frank Moro
- Miguel Manzano
- Sergio Jimenez
- Miguel Gómez Checa
- Liliana Abud
