= Ximena Córdoba =

Colombian model and actress

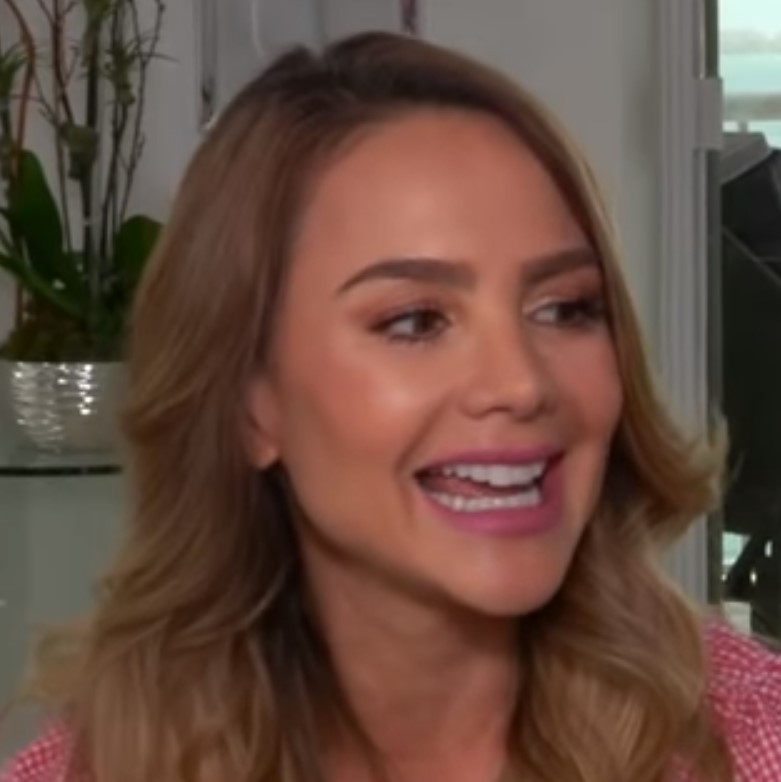
- Born: Ximena Córdoba Lodoño; November 4, 1979 (age 46); Medellín, Colombia
- Occupations: Actress, model and presenter
- Years active: 2002–present
- Spouse: Carlos Rojas (m. 2005; div. 2017)
- Children: 1

Ximena Córdoba Londoño (born November 4, 1979) is a Colombian-American model and actress. She hosts TNT Movie Club on TNT and Despierta America on Univision. Her career began with participation in the reality TV program Protagonistas de novela on RCN, and a starring role in the series Francisco el Matemático.

== Filmography ==
Film roles
Year	Title	Roles	Notes
2014	Mr. Insatiable	Stacey	Short film
2015	Tony Tango	Rebecca	
2018	Unimundo 45	Weather Woman	Short film
2020	Acrylic	Jessie	
2020	Reboot Camp	Margot	
2020	Hubie Halloween	Jenna Thomas (Weather Person)	
2022	Valentino, Be Your Own Hero Or Villain	Martha	

Television roles
Year	Title	Roles	Notes
2002	Protagonistas de novela	Herself	Winner
2003–2004	Francisco el Matemático	Alba Lucia Suarez	
2006	Las dos caras de Ana	Elena	
2007	Tomalo Suave	Victoria	
2012	Magic City	Venezuelan Contestant	
2017	En tierras salvajes	Olga Guerrero	Series regular
2019	+Noche	Herself	
2020	Patricia, Secretos de una Pasion	Rebecca Zambrano	
2021	Mi fortuna es amarte	Tania Rivas Acosta	
