= Sincronía =

- Genre: Drama
- Written by: Enrique Renteria; Hugo Rodríguez; Daniel Krauze; Gustavo Loza
- Directed by: Hugo Rodríguez; Gustavo Loza
- Music by: Rodrigo Dávila
- Country of origin: Mexico
- Original language: Spanish
- No. of seasons: 1
- No. of episodes: 12

Production
- Executive producer: Gustavo Loza
- Producers: Rafael Martinez; Paco Cossio
- Cinematography: Alberto Anaya Adalid; Emiliano Villanueva
- Editors: Jonathan Pellicer; Camilo Abadía; Isaac Verdugo
- Production company: Adicta Films

Original release
- Network: Blim
- Release: March 1, 2017

Sincronía (stylized onscreen as Sincronía, tú eliges como ver la realidad) is a Mexican drama-suspense streaming television series produced by Gustavo Loza for Blim. It premiered on March 1, 2017.

The series features a large ensemble cast, including actors recognized as Sofía Sisniega, Juan Pablo Medina, María Rojo, Manuel "Flaco" Ibáñez, Tommy Vásquez, Claudia Ramírez and Marco Pérez.

== Plot ==
The series follows the different points of view between the people involved in the same forceful event, with the force of changing the destiny of all those involved. Addressing issues such as kidnapping, trafficking in persons, influence peddling or child abuse; You will know what happens to the lives of the victims, the victimizers and those who are involved in situations where it is not easy to get ahead.

== Cast ==
- Sofía Sisniega as Paola
- Juan Pablo Medina as Alberto
- María Rojo as Madame
- Manuel "Flaco" Ibáñez as Padre García
- Tommy Vásquez as Caliman
- Claudia Ramírez as Lourdes
- Marco Pérez as Gobernador
- Héctor Kotsifakis as Héctor
- Úrsula Pruneda as Martha
- Ramón Medína as Israel
- Pablo Bracho as Padre Horacio
- Luis Fernando Peña as Zoloco
- Fernando Trujillo as José
- Arturo Vázquez as Papá de Carla
- Germán Branco as Román
- Nando Estevane as Padre Bonner
- Jorge Adrián Espíndola as Padre Galguera
- Christian Vega as Bernardo
