= En tierras salvajes =

Mexican telenovela

- Genre: Telenovela
- Created by: Ramón Campos; Gema R. Neira
- Written by: Liliana Abud; Katia Rodríguez; Victoria Orvañanos; Dolores Ortega; Julio César Nájera; Adriana Spota
- Directed by: Fernando Nesme; José Dossetti
- Starring: Claudia Álvarez; Diego Olivera; Cristián de la Fuente; Horacio Pancheri; Ninel Conde; César Évora; Daniela Romo
- Opening theme: "Estaré contigo" by Marco Antonio Solís
- Country of origin: Mexico
- Original language: Spanish
- No. of episodes: 70

Production
- Executive producer: Salvador Mejía
- Cinematography: Jesús Nájera Saro; Lino Gama Esquinca
- Editors: Marco Antonio Rocha Maza; Alfredo Frutos Maza
- Production company: Bambú Producciones

Original release
- Network: Las Estrellas
- Release: July 31 – November 5, 2017

En tierras salvajes (English title: Wild Lands) is a Mexican telenovela that aired on Las Estrellas from 31 July 2017 to 5 November 2017. The series is produced by Salvador Mejía for Televisa. It is an original story created by Ramón Campos and Gema R. Neira, and stars Claudia Álvarez, Diego Olivera, Cristián de la Fuente, Horacio Pancheri, Ninel Conde, César Évora and Daniela Romo.

== Plot summary ==
Isabel Montalbán (Claudia Álvarez) is a beautiful woman from the big city, who suffers from a serious lung problem, and goes to live in a small town, in search of rest. In her new residence live the parents and the brothers of her husband, Aníbal Otero (Diego Olivera). What no one could imagine is that the young woman's presence would change the fate of the family, forever.

Sergio (Horacio Pancheri) and Daniel (Cristián de la Fuente) are the brothers of Aníbal. Immediately, both feel a strong attraction for the young woman. Sergio is a quiet and sensible man, working as a doctor and always willing to take care of Isabel's health. On the other hand, Daniel is a handsome and savage man; he is the freest of his brothers and lives life with intense passion. He falls madly in love with his sister-in-law, but he knows he must renounce this forbidden love. On the farm of the Otero family, Don Arturo (César Évora), the patriarch of the family, is a kind and affectionate gentleman, and Dona Amparo (Daniela Romo), his wife, is a controlling and arrogant lady.

Isabel's drama begins when she feels that her marriage is failing, since Aníbal only cares about the family's business and money, and grows more distant from his wife. Isabel realizes that she is falling in love with Daniel and Sergio, but feels that she must fight to save her marriage and avoid a serious conflict in the family.

== Cast ==
=== Main ===
- Claudia Álvarez as Isabel Montalbán de Otero
- Diego Olivera as Anibal Otero
- Cristián de la Fuente as Daniel Otero
- Horacio Pancheri as Sergio Otero
- Ninel Conde as Carolina Tinoco
- César Évora as Arturo Otero
- Daniela Romo as Amparo Rivelles de Otero
- Lisardo as Carlos Molina
- Nerea Camacho as Alejandra Rivelles Zavala
- Emmanuel Palomares as Uriel Santana
- Martha Julia as Alba Castillo de Escamilla
- Salvador Pineda as Amador Morales
- Fabián Robles as Víctor Tinoco
- Jackie Sauza as Teresa Castillo
- Maricruz Nájera as Rosa
- Miguel Ángel Biaggio as Fidel Molina
- Claudia Echeverry as Carmen
- Elías Meza as Adrián Tinoco
- Ximena Córdoba as Olga Guerrero
- Jonnathan Kuri as Iker Morales
- Jessica Decote as Elisa Molina
- David Palacio as Father Blas
- Lucas Bernabé as Andrés Santana
- Daniela Álvarez as Regina
- Luis Xavier as Rodolfo Escamilla
- Marco Zetina as Gerardo
- Silvia Manríquez as María Ortega

=== Guest stars ===
- Yuvanna Montalvo as Itzel
- Ernesto Gómez Cruz as Itzel's grandfather

== Production ==
Production of the series began on March 13, 2017. It is the first production of Bambú Producciones with Televisa, created by Ramón Campos and Gema R. Neira, writers of the series Velvet and Gran Hotel, and produced by Salvador Mejía. The free version is by Liliana Abud and adaptation for TV is from Katia Rodríguez and Victoria Orvañanos.

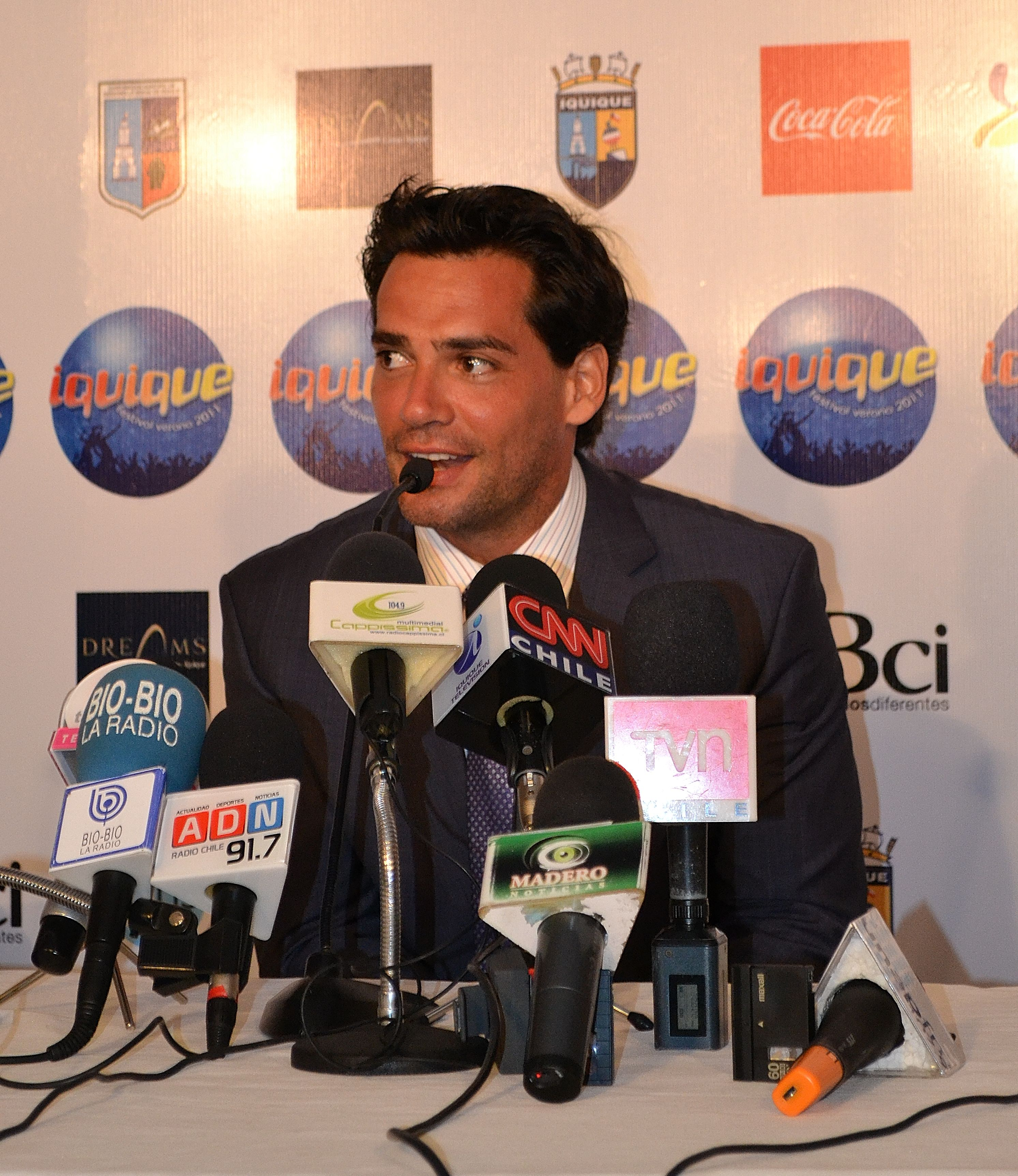
Cristián de la Fuente

The production began filming in Tzintzuntzan, Michoacán. Much of the production takes place in the Televisa San Ángel forum 10. At the beginning of production, the actors present are Cristián de la Fuente, Diego Olivera, Horacio Pancheri, Mayrín Villanueva, Daniela Romo, Maricruz Nájera, César Évora, Ninel Conde, Ximena Córdoba, Emmanuel Palomares, among others. Halfway during filming, Villanueva exited the telenovela. Claudia Álvarez replaced her, and part of the filming had to be reshot.

=== Casting ===
On February 22, 2017, producer Salvador Mejía officially presented the cast of the telenovela, where the male protagonists would be de la Fuente, Olivera and Pancheri. Mayrín Villanueva had been chosen as the protagonist of the melodrama, but due to other commitments, she left the project. On February 27, 2017, journalist Martha Figueroa confirmed on the program Hoy that Villanueva would no longer be the one to take the star role, and that it had been assigned to Claudia Álvarez. Meanwhile, Nerea Camacho was cast in the role of Alejandra.

== Rating ==
Season	Timeslot (CT)	Episodes	First aired		Last aired	
Season	Timeslot (CT)	Episodes	Date	Premiere Ratings	Date	Finale Ratings
1	Mon–Fri 7:30pm	70	July 31, 2017	22.4	November 5, 2017	22.5

== Episodes ==
No.	Title	Original release date
1	"Isabel conoce a la familia Otero"	July 31, 2017
Daniel faces a problem that could ruin the family business. The newlyweds Aníbal and Isabel are forced to change their place of residence.
2	"Isabel es una gran tentación para Daniel"	August 1, 2017
While in the city, Aníbal cheats on Isabel with another woman. Daniel cannot deny that Isabel's presence has him uneasy.
3	"Daniel rescata a Isabel"	August 2, 2017
For Aníbal, his wife is an object and his lover a talisman. Isabel is in danger when looking for Daniel at the sawmill. Iker places a substance in Alejandra's drink; he intends to abuse her.
4	"Amparo sorprende a Alejandra con Uriel"	August 3, 2017
Alejandra, believing that Uriel was fired, goes out looking for him, and when he finds him, they cannot help but kiss for the first time. Alejandra agrees to go fishing with him, but Amparo discovers them.
5	"Daniel es acusado de robo"	August 4, 2017
Sergio begins to fall in love with Isabel. Impulsively, Daniel falls into Carlos' trap, is surprised by the police, arrested and unjustly accused of theft.
6	"Isabel se desmaya en un incendio"	August 7, 2017
Isabel negotiates with Carlos Molina and gets Daniel's freedom. In San Juan, Olga searches for Aníbal and seduces him once more. Isabel suffers the consequences of helping in the fire.
7	"Anibal enfurece con Arturo y Daniel"	August 8, 2017
Daniel gets a contract for the sawmill and Arturo decides to give him an opportunity to continue in front of it. Aníbal finds out, so he explodes against his father and Daniel for doing it aside.
8	"Sergio no está seguro de casarse con Teresa"	August 9, 2017
Isabel talks to Sergio, he confesses not being sure to marry Teresa. She advises him, but Amparo listens and throws herself at Isabel because she is a bad influence on her children.
9	"Amparo finge ponerse mal de salud"	August 10, 2017
Amparo causes a tachycardia to attract attention and manipulate her family. Carolina discovers that Víctor informs Carlos of Daniel's movements at the sawmill.
10	"Olga conoce a Isabel, la esposa de su amante"	August 11, 2017
Olga looks for Aníbal, but Isabel arrives at her house without knowing that she is her husband's lover. He discovers them together and gets nervous, because Olga could end their marriage.
11	"Arturo es víctima de los chantajes de Amparo"	August 14, 2017
Daniel supposes that Isabel feels something for him, and looks for her to ask her, but they are interrupted. Amparo blackmails Arturo to authorize the expansion of the clinic.
12	"La infidelidad de Anibal podría descubrirse"	August 15, 2017
Sergio knows that Aníbal is unfaithful to his wife and threatens him to confess Isabel the truth. Elisa confesses to Andrés who is the spy of the Molina.
13	"Aníbal quiere salvar su matrimonio"	August 16, 2017
Sergio's suspicions provoke Aníbal's decision to save his marriage. Aníbal sabotages Daniel's plan to lift the sawmill strike.
14	"Daniel acepta que está enamorado"	August 17, 2017
Daniel admits to being in love with Isabel, his brother's wife. Daniel shows the culprit to disclose information to the Molina. Carlos takes revenge with Elisa for revealing the informant.
15	"Daniel enfrenta a Carlos Molina"	August 18, 2017
Elisa is taken to the hospital for the beating of her brother Carlos, Daniel feels obliged to protect her and threatens Carlos Molina.
16	"Carlos ataca a Isabel"	August 21, 2017
Tired of the abuses and injustices, Daniel and the whole town create a plan to put a stop to the Molina. The decisions of Isabel bring consequences and Carlos, enraged, tries to hit her.
17	"Isabel descubre los planes de Carlos"	August 22, 2017
For Isabel and Daniel to be together is increasingly difficult. Olga blackmails Aníbal to stay with her. Isabel discovers the plans in the house of the Molina and decides to speak with Daniel.
18	"La traición de Aníbal es descubierta"	August 23, 2017
Aníbal learns that Olga lied to him about the theft. Isabel arrives at the apartment of Aníbal and finds Olga, this evidences the betrayal of her husband.
19	"Los Molina están libres de sospecha"	August 24, 2017
Amador does not have enough evidence against the Molina, so he leaves them free. Isabel and Daniel finally kiss, but she demands him not to do it again because it is a mistake.
20	"Amparo vigila a Isabel"	August 25, 2017
Genaro follows Doña Amparo's orders and informs her of Isabel's visit to the sawmill to meet Daniel; Amparo begins to suspect that there is something else between them.
21	"Aníbal le ruega a Isabel que lo perdone"	August 28, 2017
Aníbal asks lsabel to forgive him and tries to justify what Olga told him, promises that it will not happen again. Amparo slaps Daniel and demands an explanation about his nightly encounters with Isabel.
22	"Carolina descubre un gran secreto"	August 29, 2017
Daniel arrives with Carolina to the party, Amparo can not stand it and confesses that this woman is the daughter of her husband's lover. Amparo warns lsabel that if there is something between her and Daniel, she will know what she is capable of.
23	"Iker consigue separar a Uriel de Alejandra"	August 30, 2017
Amador knows that Alejandra will receive an inheritance and forces Iker to marry her, so they send a beating to Uriel to understand. At the hospital, Isabel receives an unexpected visit.
24	"Carlos intenta deshacerse de Daniel"	August 31, 2017
Carlos finds the opportunity to get rid of Daniel, asks Victor to cause an accident at the sawmill. Olga, with lies, is admitted to the clinic, but everything is, to get closer to Aníbal.
25	"Sergio sufre un accidente"	September 1, 2017
Because of Isabel's contempt, Sergio drinks too much and has a serious accident on the road that leaves him on the verge of death.
26	"Arturo conoce los sentimientos de Sergio"	September 4, 2017
Arturo learns Sergio's true feelings and asks Isabel to clarify the situation. Carlos tries to convince the employees of the sawmill to work for him.
27	"Aníbal cree que Isabel lo engaña con Sergio"	September 5, 2017
Olga takes advantage of what she heard when Sergio deliriates and sends a message to Aníbal, making her believe that Isabel has a relationship with his brother. Carlos plans to obtain custody of his son.
28	"La policía detiene a Víctor"	September 6, 2017
Andrés discovers who caused the accident at the sawmill. When Victor is at Carolina's house to say goodbye to his nephew, the police arrive to stop him.
29	"Aníbal quiere salvar el aserradero"	September 7, 2017
Aníbal promises lsabel that he will save the sawmill. After a confrontation between brothers, Arturo is forced to make an energetic decision.
30	"Daniel acepta la ayuda de Aníbal"	September 8, 2017
Arturo gathers the workers to inform them of his decision, while Aníbal makes deals with Amador to save the sawmill. Victor gets out of jail and goes back to work with Carlos.
31	"Daniel decide irse de San Juan"	September 11, 2017
When Arturo closes the sawmill, Daniel no longer has reason to continue in the estate, so he decides to move away from San Juan del Valle for a while.
32	"Isabel le pide a Daniel que no se vaya"	September 12, 2017
Isabel can no longer silence her love, and although she knows it is wrong, she asks Daniel to stay, because she needs him. Aníbal manages to sign a contract to be named director of the sawmill.
33	"Carlos le dispara a Daniel"	September 13, 2017
Aníbal discovers that his wife sneaks in with Daniel. When they argue, Daniel saves Isabel's life and receives Carlos's shot.
34	"Isabel le dice a Aníbal que no lo ama"	September 14, 2017
Isabel discovers that Aníbal spent the night with his lover and confesses that she no longer loves him. Amparo blames Isabel for all the problems of her family.
35	"Arturo se entera que Isabel se va a divorciar"	September 15, 2017
Isabel is determined to separate from Aníbal, and confesses to her father-in-law that she is interested in someone else but makes it clear that it is not Sergio.
36	"Carolina conoce el pasado de su mamá"	September 18, 2017
Carolina finds the letters saved from her mother, so she discovers that she had an affair with Arturo, and when confronted, he decides to reveal what happened in the past.
37	"Isabel duda del amor de Daniel"	September 21, 2017
Hannibal tries to convince Isabel of Daniel's defamation to get them separated. He asks her not to believe in him, because all he does is rivalry.
38	"Iker salva la vida de Uriel"	September 22, 2017
When a bull is about to kill Uriel, lker interposes to make believe that he saves his life, and thus earn a kiss from Alejandra.
39	"Amparo le exige a Alejandra que regrese a España"	September 25, 2017
Amparo discovers that Alejandra is Uriel's girlfriend, is convinced that it is a whim and decides to send her to Spain. Amparo believes that it is the opportunity for Iker to steal her heart.
40	"Aníbal se entera que Sergio puede morir"	September 26, 2017
Aníbal meets up with Sergio while he has a crisis, and confesses that he has a clot in his brain, that if he is not operated, his life is in danger
41	"Carolina intenta quitarse la vida"	September 27, 2017
Carlos pays the judge to get custody of Adrián. Carolina, devastated because she will get away from her son, tries to commit suicide. Alejandra decides not to leave, and rendezvous with Uriel.
42	"Sergio es operado"	September 28, 2017
Sergio undergoes a risky operation. He asks Rodolfo that if the operation is not successful, let him die. Amparo learns that Alejandra never arrived at the boarding school in Spain.
43	"Isabel y Daniel se reconcilian"	September 29, 2017
Daniel prepares a special and romantic night for Isabel. She loves him and will soon divorce Anímal. Carolina surprises them in bed.
44	"Amparo acusa a Uriel de secuestro"	October 2, 2017
Amparo finds Alejandra's whereabouts, and demands Uriel for kidnapping. After discovering lsabel and Daniel together, Carolina feels betrayed and plans to escape from the village with her son.
45	"Carolina huye con su hijo"	October 3, 2017
Victor betrays Carlos to help Carolina escape with Adrián. They manage to leave San Juan del Valle so no one can find them. Isabel makes it clear to Daniel that she does not want anything with him.
46	"Isabel y Aníbal intentarán recuperar su matrimonio"	October 4, 2017
Regina tells Renato that conquering Uriel was a bet between Alejandra and her. Isabel and Aníbal announce to the family that they will leave San Juan, together. Uriel comes out of prison.
47	"Sergio se casa con Teresa"	October 5, 2017
Aníbal orders to kidnap Olga. Carlos shoots a gun at Sergio's wedding. Teresa discovers that it is Isabel who Sergio is in love with. Olga threatens to kill Isabel.
48	"Isabel comprueba la infidelidad de Aníbal"	October 6, 2017
Sergio reveals to all, the infidelity of Aníbal. Alejandra is pregnant. Amparo asks Aníbal to leave the house. Isabel reveals Silvia, who is in love with Daniel.
49	"Alejandra está embarazada"	October 9, 2017
Alejandra confirms that she is pregnant, when she breaks the news to Uriel, he rejects her and assures her that he does not want to be with her again after learning that he was the object of a bet.
50	"Aníbal quiere aliarse con los Molina"	October 10, 2017
Carlos Molina looks for Aníbal to propose to him that they are united and neither of the two sawmills goes to bankruptcy, when Arturo and Daniel find out, they reject the proposal of Aníbal.
51	"Sergio se entera que Isabel y Daniel son amantes"	October 11, 2017
Sergio finds Isabel and Daniel in the cabin while they kiss, he is surprised to discover that they have a relationship and not only made fun of him, but the whole family.
52	"Carolina es detenida por la policía"	October 12, 2017
The authorities arrest Carolina and take her son away. Alejandra discovers that someone has been stealing money from her trust.
53	"Carolina espera un hijo de Daniel"	October 13, 2017
Silvia accompanies Carolina to the clinic to find out what are the discomforts she had in prison, there she discovers that she is expecting a child. Isabel also finds out that Daniel will be a dad.
54	"Amparo descubre la relación de Isabel y Daniel"	October 16, 2017
Amparo learns that Carolina expects a son of Daniel, decides to go to the cabin to get out of doubt and finds him kissing Isabel.
55	"Daniel defiende el amor que siente por Isabel"	October 17, 2017
Amparo confronts Daniel, claims to have betrayed Aníbal and steal Isabel's love, Daniel assures her that it was not so and that he is willing to defend what he feels for her.
56	"Carolina le da un ultimátum a Danie"	October 18, 2017
Carolina asks Daniel to choose who he wants to be with, she is not willing to see him with Isabel and if so, she assures him that she prefers not to have her son.
57	"Daniel formará una familia con Carolina"	October 19, 2017
Daniel has made a difficult decision, accepts that he had never loved someone like Isabel, but he must do the right thing and it is best to start a family with Carolina and his son.
58	"Alejandra acepta la propuesta de Iker"	October 20, 2017
Alejandra agrees to say that the baby she is expecting is from Iker, she is very afraid that Amparo will find out that the baby is really from Uriel.
59	"Daniel se casa con Carolina"	October 23, 2017
Daniel wants Carolina to be sure of him and for his peace of mind he decides to marry her to show her that he really cares about the welfare of his son.
60	"Amparo se entera que Alejandra está embarazada"	October 24, 2017
Amparo wants to know why her niece suffered a hemorrhage, Alejandra can not continue hiding the truth and confesses that she is pregnant.
61	"Amador asesina a Carolina"	October 25, 2017
Carolina listens that Amador betrayed Aníbal and that along with Olga they think to flee with the fraud money. To avoid that Carolina speaks, Amador shoots her without mercy and assassinates her.
62	"Uriel impide que Alejandra se case con Iker"	October 26, 2017
Alejandra is about to get married, but Uriel arrives in time to prevent her from giving her life to Iker. The love of Alejandra and Uriel triumphs, they decide to get married.
63	"Carlos paga por la muerte de Carolina"	October 27, 2017
Before dying, Carolina declared that Carlos was responsible for her disappearance, so he is arrested and unjustly accused of the death of Carolina.
64	"Isabel se convierte en socia de la clínica"	October 30, 2017
Isabel saves the clinic of the Otero family, by buying the shares of Rodolfo, becomes a majority partner and her first decision is to open the public area.
65	"Sergio le pide una oportunidad a Isabel"	October 31, 2017
After being pronounced dead in the forest fire, Daniel appears, but arrives at the clinic at the moment when Sergio confessed his love to Isabel and she kissed him.
66	"Arturo descubre que Amparo protegió a Aníbal"	November 1, 2017
Arturo learns that Aníbal is an accomplice of Carolina's killer and that Amparo protected him, when Arturo tried to go to the police, he suffers a stroke that leaves his life in danger.
67	"Daniel vuelve con Isabel"	November 2, 2017
Daniel does not want to repeat the mistake he made some time ago, so he accepts in front of his family that he loves Isabel and they have decided to be together, apparently she stopped caring for Aníbal.
68	"Alejandra es secuestrada por Iker"	November 3, 2017
Iker asks Alejandra for her inheritance in exchange for seeing Uriel alive, but she is also captured and subdued by him, who tries to abuse her in front of Uriel.
69	"Sergio salva la vida de Isabel"	November 5, 2017
70	"Isabel y Daniel viven su amor en tierras salvajes"	November 5, 2017
Amador kidnaps Isabel to assassinate her in a ritual for her sect. Alejandra and Uriel manage to escape, but they suffer a terrible accident. Arturo recovers his memory and decides to denounce Aníbal. Carlos attempts to shoot Isabel, but Sergio gets in the way and falls seriously injured, sacrificing his life to save the woman he loves. Olga tells Daniel that Aníbal was present when Amador shot Carolina. Aníbal decides to turn himself in to the police for the death of Carolina. Isabel returns with Daniel, seeing that now they have their own family, they decide to live in the present without hatred and without regrets to be happy in the wild lands that saw their love born.

== Awards and nominations ==
Year	Award	Category	Nominated	Result
2018	36th TVyNovelas Awards	Best Leading Actress	Daniela Romo	Nominated
2018	36th TVyNovelas Awards	Best Supporting Actor	Fabián Robles	Nominated
2018	36th TVyNovelas Awards	Best Young Lead Actor	Emmanuel Palomares	Nominated
2018	36th TVyNovelas Awards	Best Musical Theme	"Estaré contigo" by Marco Antonio Solís	Nominated
