= How to Break Up with Your Douchebag =

- Directed by: Gabriela Tagliavini
- Screenplay by: Ricardo Álvarez Canales
- Story by: Patricio Saiz
- Starring: Mariana Treviño; Christopher von Uckermann; Camila Sodi; Sebastián Zurita
- Cinematography: Fido Pérez-Gavilán
- Edited by: Jorge García; Pablo Wrege
- Music by: Emilio Kauderer
- Release date: 6 October 2017 (Mexico)
- Country: Mexico
- Language: Spanish

How to Break Up with Your Douchebag (Spanish: Cómo cortar a tu patán) is a 2017 Mexican romantic comedy film directed by Gabriela Tagliavini, and premiered on 6 October 2017. The film stars Mariana Treviño, Christopher von Uckermann, Camila Sodi y Sebastián Zurita.

== Plot ==
Amanda Lozano (Mariana Treviño), is a woman who makes a living as a therapist specializing in helping women end destructive relationships. She is a successful and empowered woman, but she discovers that her sister Natalia (Camila Sodi) is in love with a lazy and macho idiot named René (Sebastián Zurita), who repeatedly cheats on her. To separate her from him, she plans a strategy to get her sister to fall in love with her best friend Leo (Christopher von Uckermann). What he doesn't know is that in the middle of this mission he will have to face his greatest fear of all: love.

== Cast ==
- Mariana Treviño as Amanda
- Christopher von Uckermann as Leo
- Camila Sodi as Natalia
- Sebastián Zurita as Pepe
- Marianna Burelli as Regina
- Giovanna Zacarías as Valeria
- Marina de Tavira as Armando's mother
- Michelle Rodríguez as Martita
- Uriel del Toro as Novio Yogurt 3
- Nacho Tahhan as Novio Sano
