= Blue Demon (TV series) =

- Genre: Drama
- Created by: Alejandro Martínez-Beltrán; Carlos Algara
- Screenplay by: Florencia Castillo; Rodrigo Ordoñez; Larissa Andrade; Fernando Ábrego; Luis Guerrero; Luis Gamboa; Max Zunino; Anaí López
- Directed by: Mauricio Cruz; Javier Solar
- Creative director: Ana Magis
- Starring: See list
- Music by: Luis Carlos; Lucas Ortega; Camilo Froideval; Raúl Vizzi
- Opening theme: "Blue Demon, sí Señor" performed by Malashunta
- Country of origin: Mexico
- Original language: Spanish
- No. of seasons: 3
- No. of episodes: 65 (list of episodes)

Production
- Executive producers: Ximena Cantuarias; Juan Pablo Posada; Daniel Ucros
- Cinematography: Josué Eber Morales; Luis Ávila
- Camera setup: Multi-camera
- Production companies: Sony Pictures Television; Televisa; Teleset

Original release
- Network: Blim
- Release: November 11, 2016 – April 14, 2017

Blue Demon is a Spanish-language television series produced by Teleset for Televisa and Sony Pictures Television. The series is based on the life of the famous Mexican professional wrestler and actor Blue Demon. On November 11, 2016, the series was published on the Blim platform the first season and consists of 20 episodes. The series starred Tenoch Huerta as Blue Demon and Ana Brenda Contreras as Goyita. The series premiered on January 15, 2017, in the United States on UniMás and ended on July 15, 2017.

== Plot summary ==
After a chance encounter with a famous wrestler, Alejandro Muñóz Moreno becomes fascinated by lucha libre and sets out to become the greatest masked wrestler in history.

== Cast ==
=== Main ===
- Tenoch Huerta as Alejandro Muñóz / Blue Demon
- Ana Brenda Contreras as Gregoria Vera / Goyita
- Joaquín Cosio as Ignacio Vera
- Ianis Guerrero as Carlos Cruz
- Silverio Palacios as Tío Crescencio
- Tomás Goro as Efraín Larrañaga
- Alejandro de Marino as Franklin Fernández
- Arturo Carmona as Ala Dorada
- Andrés Almeida as Guillén
- José Sefami
- Gloria Stalina as Fina
- Ana Layevska as Silvia Garza
- Juan Pablo Medina as Doctor Buelna
- María Nela Sinisterra
- Diana Lein as Rosario Castro
- Felipe Nájera as Madariaga

=== Recurring ===
- Arnulfo Reyes Sánchez as Checo López
- César René Vigné as Calavera
- Harding Junior as Macumbo
- Nacho Tahhan as Daniel Porier

== Episodes ==
Season	Episodes	Originally released
1	20	November 11, 2016
2	20	February 24, 2017
3	25	April 14, 2017

== Awards and nominations ==
Year	Award	Category	Nominated	Result
2017	TVyNovelas Awards	Best Series	Daniel Ucros	Nominated
2017	TVyNovelas Awards	Best Actress in Series	Ana Brenda Contreras	Won
2017	TVyNovelas Awards	Best Actor in Series	Tenoch Huerta	Nominated
