= Las 13 esposas de Wilson Fernández =

- Genre: Black comedy
- Starring: Martín Altomaro
- Country of origin: Mexico
- Original language: Spanish
- No. of seasons: 1
- No. of episodes: 13

Original release
- Network: Blim
- Release: May 12, 2017

Las 13 esposas de Wilson Fernández is a Mexican black comedy streaming television series that premiered on May 12, 2017, on Blim. Based on the Argentine series of the same name produced in 2014. It stars Martín Altomaro as the titular character.

The series follows the story of a pianist who comes to a club in search of work, there he talks to the boss, this takes place in one day but during the series Wilson goes telling his anecdotes that lived with each of his wives.

The series was renewed to a second season on June 27, 2017.

== Plot ==
The series tells the life of an incurable musician and romantic. Wilson fervently believes in marriage but for one reason or another, each of his wives ends up leaving. He works as a keyboard player in a sports club controlled by a dark group but also of endearing characters.

== Cast ==
- Martín Altomaro as Wilson Fernández
- Paulina Dávila as Camila
- Ximena Romo as Emilia
- Andrea Guerra as Eliana
- Cassandra Sánchez Navarro as Gloria
- Ilse Salas as Paulina
- Adriana Llabrés as Martha / Silvia
- Camila Selser as Alicia
- Tato Alexander as Alfonsina
- Zuria Vega as María Teresa
- Esmeralda Pimentel as Amanda
- Mónica Huarte as Ema
- Alejandra Ambrosi as Carolina
- Jolein Rutgers as Elizabeth

== Episodes ==
No.	Title	Original release date
1	"Camila"	May 12, 2017
Wilson, a mediocre pianist, is summoned by mobsters to play during an important dinner. He soon realizes that strange things happen in that place.
2	"Emilia"	May 12, 2017
Wilson tells the story of his second wife, while Beti tortures a pianist trying to know her secret.
3	"Eliana"	May 12, 2017
Rocío and Tamalito put the offering of dead in the Farolito and listen the strange third story of Wilson.
4	"Gloria"	May 12, 2017
Wilson tells a new story when Betti's mom, The Empress, appears at the Farolito to make the dinner on the day of the dead.
5	"Paulina"	May 12, 2017
Beti, Wilson, Salvat and Coelho meet in the Sanctuary to beat Fabian and learn of a news they could not imagine.
6	"Martha"	May 12, 2017
Beti interrupts the story of Wilson's new wife to tell him the reason for Salvat's name.
7	"Alicia"	May 12, 2017
The members of El Farolito help Rocío and Tamalito to finish the offering. Wilson tells another story and tells him how Rocío came to the club.
8	"Alfonsina"	May 12, 2017
The arrival of Isabel to El Farolito causes Beti to become angry. All the others are preparing for the arrival of Mr. Cheng.
9	"María Teresa"	May 12, 2017
The tension in the Farolito begins to get out of control but Wilson has something planned.
10	"Amanda"	May 12, 2017
Salvat insists that Wilson stop telling the story of his dark wife and prepare for the arrival of Mr. Cheng.
11	"Ema"	May 12, 2017
Mr. Cheng arrives at El Farolito and surprises everyone, for it is not what they expected. Wilson tells Mr. Cheng the story of his eleventh wife, Ema.
12	"Carolina"	May 12, 2017
Mr. Cheng inspects the special ball and is surprised with the good idea of Salvat. He decides to ask the members of El Farolito a favor that will leave them cold.
13	"Elizabeth"	May 12, 2017
As he begins his plan, Wilson tells how he met Elizabeth, the last of his wives.
