= Dogma (TV series) =

2017 Mexican television series

- Genre: Suspense
- Directed by: Carlos Carrera
- Starring: Iliana Fox; Daniel Martínez
- Country of origin: Mexico
- Original language: Spanish
- No. of seasons: 1
- No. of episodes: 13

Production
- Executive producers: Leonardo Zimbrón; Mónica Vargas
- Producer: Rodrigo Calderón

Original release
- Network: Blim
- Release: November 1, 2017 – January 24, 2018

Dogma is a Mexican anthology suspense television series produced by Leonardo Zimbrón and Mónica Vargas Celis for Televisa. The first season premiered on the Blim platform and Canal 5 on November 1, 2017. Production of the first season concluded on September 10, 2016.

The series tells the story of Bruno (Daniel Martínez), an investigator of supernatural events who is forced to work with Alicia (Iliana Fox), a theologian specializing in religious cults. The cases they investigate include rituals of exorcism and other supernatural phenomena.

== Synopsis ==
=== Season 1: Dogma Libro I ===
Bruno Santini, an outstanding researcher of miracles and supernatural events, is recruited by Velázquez, an enigmatic man who represents a mysterious client. Velázquez offers to continue financing Bruno's research institute on the condition that he solve a series of miraculous and inexplicable cases together with Dr. Alicia Cervantes, a renowned theologian and researcher specialized in religious cults.

== Cast ==
- Iliana Fox as Alicia Cervantes
- Daniel Martínez as Bruno Santini
- Liz Gallardo
- Moisés Arizmendi as Velászquez

== Episodes ==
No.	Title	Original release date
1	"Versiculo 1.1 Posesión"	November 1, 2017
Doctors Bruno Santini and Alicia Cervantes, investigate the case of David, a child who is in a coma, after being brutally beaten by his father and a priest, in a supposed exorcism. A case that resonates directly with the stormy past of Bruno.
2	"Versiculo 1.2 Sanación"	November 8, 2017
Abner Bautista, leader of the cult Redeemer Path, supposedly possesses the power of healing. Bruno must investigate to decipher how the "miracle" happens without knowing that they face a rival much more powerful than they ever imagined.
3	"Versiculo 1.3 Llanto"	November 15, 2017
A virgin who cries blood shocks an entire region of indigenous communities. When Bruno and Alicia arrive to investigate, they realize that they must confront the church and its faithful, who are willing to defend the miracle with their own lives.
4	"Versiculo 1.4 Rapto"	November 22, 2017
A whole town disappears mysteriously, after the inhabitants see some inexplicable lights and listen to apocalyptic trumpets. Bruno and Alicia should investigate what happened, but above all, who did it and for what reason.
5	"Versiculo 1.5 Premonición"	November 29, 2017
After the tragic explosion of the Estela de Luz, Bruno and Alicia investigate Daniela, a girl who apparently predicted the attack. The supposed powers of Daniela call the attention of Velázquez, because the client is very interested in finding gifted people, like her.
6	"Versiculo 1.6 Susurros"	December 6, 2017
A child sneaks into a monastery and claims to have seen and heard the devil. Bruno and Alicia investigate the site only to discover that within their walls, terrible and dangerous rituals are performed that will put their lives at imminent risk.
7	"Versiculo 1.7 Reencarnación"	December 13, 2017
Bruno must go to Guadalajara with Monica Sanchez to investigate Valeria, a girl who claims to remember her past life. Alicia decides to stay to prepare the case against Bautista, after finding evidence that links him to the sacrifices of the monastery.
8	"Versiculo 1.8 La marca del diablo"	December 20, 2017
While investigating the case of a baby born with the 666 mark, and who also brought the plague to a town subdued by the narco; Bruno and Alicia are kidnapped in a hostile and bloodthirsty environment, where the only way to get out alive is to solve the mystery.
9	"Versiculo 1.9 Estigmas"	December 27, 2017
Rox, a transvestite prostitute from the suburbs, develops a strange case of stigmas. When Bruno and Alicia investigate it, they realize that they must fight against the church and against a great hidden force that wants to disappear it.
10	"Versiculo 1.10 Fuego"	January 3, 2018
What seemed like a strange case of spontaneous combustion, leads Bruno and Alicia into the dangerous and somber world of human trafficking.
11	"Versiculo 1.11 Revelación"	January 10, 2018
After the strange appearance of a man announcing the end of the world in the middle of a football match, Bruno and Alicia start a tireless search to unmask whoever is behind this event.
12	"Versiculo 1.12 Purgatorio"	January 17, 2018
After an unexpected tragedy, Bruno realizes that Alicia and Daniela are in imminent danger. He tries to meet them, but they have disappeared without a trace. Bruno will have to face his worst demons, to try to save them from an atrocious destiny.
13	"Versiculo 1.13 Ritual"	January 24, 2018
Bruno must start and enter an unknown world, where time will be a fundamental factor in saving Daniela and Alicia.

== Awards and nominations ==
Year	Award	Category	Nominated	Result
2018	TVyNovelas Awards	Best Series	Leonardo Zimbrón and Mónica Vargas	Nominated
2018	TVyNovelas Awards	Best Actress in Series	Iliana Fox	Nominated
2018	TVyNovelas Awards	Best Actor in Series	Daniel Martínez	Nominated
