= Blim TV =

Defunct Mexican streaming service from Televisa

- Website type: Public
- Available in: Spanish
- Dissolved: 31 March 2023; 3 years ago
- Headquarters: Mexico City, Mexico
- Owner: Televisa S. de R.L. de C.V
- CEO: Luis Arvizu
- Products: Streaming media; Video on demand
- Services: Film production; Film distribution; Television production
- Website: www.blim.com
- Registration: Required
- Launched: 22 February 2016; 10 years ago
- Current status: Closed

Blim TV (stylized as blim tv) was an on-demand video subscription service, offered online via TelevisaUnivision, through an Internet connection, which offers access to programs strictly for personal use, in exchange for payment of a monthly subscription fee.

Its center of operations was in Mexico City. It was made available in 18 countries: Mexico, Colombia, Argentina, Costa Rica, Panama, Chile, Peru, Venezuela, Ecuador, Guatemala, Bolivia, Honduras, Paraguay, El Salvador, Nicaragua, Uruguay, Dominican Republic and Belize.

It owned the productions of Televisa, as well the broadcast rights for titles from creators and distributors like Walt Disney Pictures, Paramount Pictures, Metro-Goldwyn-Mayer and BBC.

To compete with other on demand video services, it initially offered a monthly subscription for 109 pesos (approximately $5.65 US). Like Netflix, Blim TV offered the first month of its service free of charge.

On 3 September 2019, Blim was relaunched as "Blim TV", adding 30 live television channels like Las Estrellas, Canal 5, Tlnovelas, Telemundo Internacional and Antena 3.

As of July 2021, Luis Arvizu was the CEO of the company.

In 2022, Blim TV merged all assets to Vix.

== Controversy ==
In 2016, Televisa realized people watched Netflix more than cable television. In an attempt to re-gain their lost viewers, they decided to remove all of their original content from Netflix. They then created their own Netflix-like streaming service, called Blim. Soon after Televisa announced Blim, Mexicans began mocking them through Internet memes for producing lesser-quality original content compared to Netflix's more critically acclaimed original content. Netflix itself released an ad which made fun of Televisa's original content. It criticized Blim and Televisa for the perceived lesser quality of their content, as well as for removing it from Netflix. The ad featured a man acting sad because Televisa's original content was removed, with his mom looking at him strangely. Televisa retaliated by releasing an ad where a look-a-like man was happy having subscribed to Blim. However Televisa's ad did not get the response they expected. It only caused more unfavorable criticism compared to Netflix. Blim and Televisa were even more heavily criticized for not understanding Millennials, some of whom went as far as thanking Televisa for removing their content from Netflix. The main argument against Televisa was that there was no need to pay for a streaming service to see series that are available to watch on YouTube without needing to buy cable in the first place.

== Original programming ==
Title	Genre	Premiere	Seasons	Status
40 y 20	Comedy	1 April 2016	4 seasons, 52 episodes	Renewed for a fourth season
Nosotros los guapos	Comedy	16 August 2016	4 seasons, 57 episodes	Ended
Sin rastro de ti	Telenovela	9 September 2016	1 season, 16 episodes	Ended
Blue Demon	Drama	11 November 2016	3 seasons, 65 episodes	Ended
Súper X	Comedy	20 January 2017	2 seasons, 16 episodes	Ended
Sincronía	Drama Suspense	1 March 2017	1 season, 12 episodes	Ended
Las 13 esposas de Wilson Fernández	Black comedy	12 May 2017	1 season, 13 episodes	Renewed for a second season
Érase una vez	Fairy tale	2 October 2017	1 season, 12 episodes	Ended
Dogma	Suspense	1 November 2017	1 season, 13 episodes	Ended
¡Ay Güey!	Comedy	24 December 2017	1 season, 13 episodes	Ended
