= Mi secreto =

Mexican telenovela

- Genre: Telenovela
- Based on: Ha llegado una intrusa by Marissa Garrido
- Developed by: Martha Carrillo; Cristina García
- Directed by: Nelinho Acosta; Luis Eduardo Reyes
- Starring: Diego Klein; Macarena García; Karyme Lozano; Arturo Peniche; Isidora Vives; Andrés Baida; Claudia Ramírez; Fernando Ciangherotti; Alma Delfina; Luis Felipe Tovar; Vanessa Bauche
- Theme music composer: Tommy Torres
- Opening theme: "Mi secreto" by Tommy Torres
- Composer: Xavier Asali
- Country of origin: Mexico
- Original language: Spanish
- No. of seasons: 1
- No. of episodes: 120

Production
- Executive producer: Carlos Moreno
- Producer: Hilda Santaella Hernández
- Cinematography: Daniel Ferrer; Alejandro Álvarez Ceniceros
- Editors: Alfredo Sánchez Díaz; Daniel Rentería Carmona
- Camera setup: Multi-camera
- Production company: TelevisaUnivision

Original release
- Network: Las Estrellas
- Release: 12 September 2022 – 24 February 2023

Mi secreto (English title: My Secret) is a Mexican telenovela that aired on Las Estrellas from 12 September 2022 to 24 February 2023. The series is produced by Carlos Moreno for TelevisaUnivision. It is based on the 1974 Mexican telenovela Ha llegado una intrusa created by Marissa Garrido. It stars Macarena García, Isidora Vives, Diego Klein and Andrés Baida.

== Plot ==
Valeria (Macarena García) is forced to take the identity of her best friend Natalia (Isidora Vives), whom she believes to be dead, in order to avoid going to jail for a crime she did not commit. As she assumes her new reality, Valeria suffers constantly from the fear of being discovered by Natalia's family, by the police, but mainly by Mateo (Diego Klein), the man she loves and who is unaware that she is an impostor.

== Cast ==
- Diego Klein as Mateo Miranda
  - Nicolás Villagrana as child Mateo
- Macarena García as Valeria Bernal
  - Ana Paula Cachoua as child Valeria
- Karyme Lozano as Daniela Estrada
- Arturo Peniche as Ernesto Lascuráin
- Isidora Vives as Natalia Ugarte Moncada
  - Valentina Galiano as child Natalia
- Andrés Baida as Rodrigo Carvajal
  - Rodrigo Vargas as child Rodrigo
- Claudia Ramírez as Fedra Espinoza
  - Lizy Martínez as young Fedra
- Fernando Ciangherotti as Alfonso Ugarte
  - Kuno Becker as young Alfonso
- Alma Delfina as Elena Mendoza
  - Evangelina Sosa as young Elena
- Luis Felipe Tovar as Hilario Miranda
  - Alejandro Valencia as young Hilario
- Vanessa Bauche as Carmita Rivero de Carvajal
  - Sharon Gaytan as young Carmita
- Luis Fernando Peña as Joaquín Carvajal
- Eric del Castillo as Father David
- Chris Pazcal as Gabino Ocampo
- Ana Paula Martínez as Constanza Carvajal
- Daniela Martínez as Melissa Riberol
- Laura Vignatti as Inés Guzmán
- Mauricio Abularach as Bermúdez
- Lalo Palacios as Luis Aguirre Mendoza
  - Jorge Alanís as teen Luis
- Adrián Escalona as Lalo Carvajal
  - Iker Vallín as child Lalo
- Rocío Reyna as Fabiola Carvajal
  - Cosette as child Fabiola
- Susana Jímenez as Sofía
- Ruy Gaytán as Julián
- Ramsés Alemán as Iker Carrera

=== Recurring and guest stars ===
- Alejandra Jurado as Juana
- Arturo Vinales as Felipe
- Solkin Ruz as Tony
- Alejandra Andreu as Álvarez
- Fernando Manzano as Duarte
- Ana Layevska as Mariana
- Erick García Rojas as Lucio
- Juan Luis Arias as Javier
- Priscila Solorio as Gaby
- Mateo Camacho as Eugenio
- Paola Toyos as Tania
- Amy Nicole as Itzel
- Amaranta Ruiz as Dalila

== Production ==
In February 2022, it was reported that it was reported that Carlos Moreno would be producing a new version of the 1974 telenovela Ha llegado una intrusa, with the working title being La impostora. On 15 June 2022, Macarena García, Isidora Vives, Diego Klein and Andrés Baida were announced in the lead roles, with the title being changed to Mi secreto. Filming of the telenovela began on 5 July 2022. On 17 October 2022, it was announced that the telenovela would be divided into two parts, to be aired without interruption. The second part premiered on 30 November 2022. Filming concluded on 21 December 2022.

== Ratings ==
Season	Timeslot (CT)	Episodes	First aired		Last aired	
Season	Timeslot (CT)	Episodes	Date	Viewers (millions)	Date	Viewers (millions)
1	Mon–Fri 4:30 p.m.	120	12 September 2022	2.5	24 February 2023	3.3

== Episodes ==
No.	Title	Original release date
Part 1
1	"Hay heridas que no se pueden borrar"	12 September 2022 (Note: Premiere early online through Las Estrellas website on 9 September 2022.)
Fedra arrives at Mariana's house, but she has other intentions. Juana reveals to Valeria that she is adopted. Fedra makes Alfonso jealous of Fermín, Mariana's ex-boyfriend. Juana learns that Valeria must be taken to a boarding school in Spain. Fedra insinuates to Alfonso that maybe Natalia is not his daughter, he asks Mariana for a paternity test because he is sure that Natalia is Fermín's daughter. Fedra is accused of theft. Fedra gets involved with Alfonso and Mariana discovers them.
2	"Nadie me quiere"	13 September 2022
Alfonso learns that Mariana changed her will days before she died, Fedra advises Alfonso to contest the will, he refuses. Alfonso assures Natalia that even though she is not his daughter he will treat her as if she were and informs her that Fedra is his girlfriend. Natalia decides to take revenge on Fedra by placing a snake in her bed. Alfonso sends Natalia to a boarding school in Spain where she meets Valeria. Fifteen years later, Natalia and Valeria suffer a car accident after they help Tony escape from the police.
3	"No soy la misma Natalia"	14 September 2022
Valeria discovers that she has Natalia's bag and takes advantage of their resemblance to usurp her identity. Valeira arrives at Juana's house, but is rejected by her, and seeing that she does not have enough money to survive in the city, she decides to travel with Natalia's identity to San Carlos. During the trip, Valeria meets Mateo. Valeria arrives at the Moncada ranch. Mateo tells her dad that he met a girl during his trip to San Carlos. Valeria begins to get to know the ranch. Fedra wants to get rid of Natalia. Mateo discovers that the girl he met on the plane is Natalia.
4	"Hay cosas que no se olvidan"	15 September 2022
Mateo tells his father that Natalia has returned to the ranch. Fedra suspects that something is not right with Natalia. Fedra goes to Gabino's room to sleep with him. Hilario informs Natalia that Alfonso's mismanagement is bankrupting the ranch. Mateo is indifferent when he sees Valeria, she thinks it was because of what Natalia did in the past. Fedra shows Natalia the invitation to Mateo's wedding with Melisa. Rodrigo is reunited with Natalia. Natalia asks Mateo to forget the past and give her a chance.
5	"Hasta aquí la dejamos"	16 September 2022
Fedra finds out that Natalia can contest the will left by Mariana. Mateo decides to break up with Melisa when she confirms that she is not willing to live in his town. Fedra and Alfonso fear that the investors no longer want to rescue the ranch. Alfonso plans to declare bankruptcy in order to sell the ranch, Natalia gives him an alternative to rescue it. Lalo remembers that years ago he kept a briefcase from the notary. Elena informs Natalia that her mother's last will was to inherit her entire fortune. Fedra assures Alfonso that they could listen to Natalia, to keep her quiet for a while.
6	"Abrázame por favor"	19 September 2022
Hilario informs Mateo that Ernesto and Melisa are no longer going to invest in the ranch, Natalia makes a proposal to Alfonso and Fedra to turn part of the ranch into a hotel, they refuse. Valeria suffers an accident and falls into the river, Mateo saves her. Valeria begins to be delirious in front of Mateo, he does not understand what is happening and kisses her. Fedra asks Gabino to help her so that the town begins to hate Natalia. Valeria wants to thank Mateo for saving her life.
7	"Aquí no te queremos"	20 September 2022
Elena complains to Gabino for trying to antagonize the workers against Natalia; upon hearing this, Mateo forces Gabino to retract his statement. Elena discovers a photo of the real Natalia in 'Natalia's' cell phone and confronts her about the great resemblance with Mariana, she assures her that she is a great friend that she will never see again since she died in an accident. Natalia looks for Mateo to thank him for saving her life, she decides to go to the town market and is attacked. Fabiola no longer wants to live at home because her parents are too controlling, so she asks her friend for help. Natalia apologizes to the town for the mistake she made in the past.
8	"Soy una impostora"	21 September 2022
Rodrigo, feeling a strong attraction for Natalia, kisses her and confesses that his love has not changed since they were children, she asks him to be friends for the time being. Fedra causes the loan requested by Natalia and Mateo to be rejected. Fabiola gets ready to start selling sexy pictures. Elena comments to Hilario that there are many things about 'Natalia' that don't remind her of her little girl. Valeria accepts that she has feelings for Mateo. 'Natalia' informs the police that her friend Valeria was only a victim of her friend Tony. Valeria wants to join the women's soccer team, but is rejected. Valeria, feeling the rejection of the town, confesses to Father David that she usurped the identity of her friend Natalia and that her real name is Valeria Bernal.
9	"Atente a las consecuencias"	22 September 2022
Father David asks Natalia to prove her innocence. Fedra and Gabino are discovered by Natalia and she demands that they end their relationship, otherwise she will tell her father the truth. Valeria dreams that she is arrested for being an impostor. Rodrigo tells Mateo that he kissed Natalia, but was rejected because she only sees him as a friend. Fedra sets a trap for Natalia. Fedra recovers Mariana's watch. Fabiola sees Mateo with Natalia and makes a scene.
10	"Los errores se pagan muy caro"	23 September 2022
Mateo recognizes that Natalia is no longer the same person and agrees to give her a chance to redeem herself. Natalia tells Alfonso about her decision to stay permanently in the ranch. Fedra rejects the idea of losing her future earnings. Hilario suffers a heart attack. Melisa regrets having cancelled her wedding to Mateo.
11	"Esto es amor de verdad"	26 September 2022
Elena tells Inés that she ran into Tomás, a man who hurt her in the past. Natalia agrees to go out with Rodrigo, but she keeps thinking that Mateo might reconcile with Melisa. Mateo informs Natalia that Ernesto is going to invest in the ranch. Melisa arrives in San Carlos to surprise Mateo. Natalia tells Mateo that their kiss means a lot to her, and they decide to go on a romantic date.
12	"Estoy embarazada"	27 September 2022
Mateo and Natalia keep their relationship a secret so as not to hurt Rodrigo. Natalia learns that Inés has been evicted and invites her family to live with her at the ranch. Melisa confesses to Mateo that she is expecting his child and is determined to start a family with him. Natalia confronts her father when she sees that he rejected Inés' family and threatens to contest her mother's will. Mateo reveals to Natalia that Melisa is expecting his child. With Gabino's help, Fedra manages to exchange the original painting with the fake one, thus setting a trap for Natalia.
13	"No cometas el error de tu vida"	28 September 2022
Melisa meets Natalia and asks Mateo to announce that they are expecting a baby. Melisa has hopes of resuming her engagement with Mateo. Father David asks Valeria to confess the truth about her identity to Mateo. Fedra manages to put Tamayo's painting up for sale. Mateo reveals to Hilario that Melisa is pregnant and upon learning Mateo's plans, Hilario begins to feel bad.
14	"Tomar la decisión correcta"	29 September 2022
Fabiola makes Melisa believe that she is not the only woman Mateo has slept with. Elena notices that Natalia no longer has the mark on her neck and makes her doubt her identity. Ernesto tells Natalia that he has already been offered the original painting that she is selling. When Ernesto learns of Natalia's plans, he offers to help her remodel the ranch and turn it into a hotel, Melisa offers a loan, but Natalia refuses and Ernesto threatens to withdraw his investment. Melisa plans to flee the country so that Mateo does not claim paternity of her son.
15	"Asume las consecuencias de tus actos"	30 September 2022
Mateo assures Melisa that marriage is not the only solution for him to be close to his son. Ernesto tells Natalia that seeing her reminds him of a very special person. Valeria learns that her case has not been closed so the investigations by the Spanish police will continue. Gabino discovers that Fabiola works selling scantily clad photos, he asks her for part of her earnings in exchange for keeping her secret. Elena is afraid that her secret will be discovered now that Tomás is back. Fedra is reunited with Ernesto at the airport. Elena advises Alfonso to give Natalia a DNA test to convince him that she is his daughter.
16	"Para amar se necesitan dos"	3 October 2022
Melisa wants to teach Mateo a lesson. Alfonso takes the DNA test. Valeria discovers that Fabiola has a bracelet very similar to the one she lost when she fell into the river. Mateo forbids Fabiola to interfere in his life and demands that she return the bracelet to Natalia. Valeria learns about Luis' cave. Natalia assures Rodrigo that she cannot fall in love with him. Ernesto is determined to buy the artwork, but is confused to see that there are two original works. Alfonso informs Fedra that he took a paternity test behind Natalia's back. Natalia tells Mateo that she is afraid that Rodrigo will no longer be friends with him when he finds out that they are a couple.
17	"Nunca me había sentido tan feliz"	4 October 2022
Fabiola continues to market her photos. Fedra visits the laboratory where Alfonso took the DNA test to try to bribe the nurse and find out the results before anyone else. Daniela wakes up from her coma. Rodrigo receives good news to study abroad. Mateo and Natalia make love. Fedra is upset to see that Natalia sold some things from the ranch while she was away. Fedra begins to sell her jewelry because she wants to investigate Manuel.
18	"Yo no soy Natalia"	5 October 2022
Daniela tells the doctors that the only person she remembers is her cousin Fedra. Alfonso and Natalia discover that the artwork they have at the ranch does not have the seal of authenticity. Fedra refuses to sell the original painting to Manuel. Alfonso gets the results of the DNA test and Fedra reiterates that she never lied to him when she told him that Mariana was cheating on him. Elena discovers that Natalia is not Alfonso's daughter and decides to confront her, Valeria confesses her true identity.
19	"Todo se pone en mi contra"	6 October 2022
Valeria explains to Elena the reason why she usurped Natalia's identity. Hilario opposes Mateo's relationship with Natalia. Fedra learns of Mateo's relationship with Natalia. Gabino informs Melisa that Mateo and Natalia are lovers and for that reason he does not want to marry her. Elena confesses to Father David that she feels conflicted about knowing the truth about Valeria.
20	"El último testamento de Mariana"	7 October 2022
Valeria gives Lalo a treasure chest and discovers that the briefcase he kept for years contains Mariana's will. Daniela informs her doctor that her body reacts negatively when she sees Ernesto. Elena finds Natalia's stolen watch among Fedra's things and when she confronts her, Natalia overhears them. Mateo tells Natalia that he is going to confess to Rodrigo about their relationship.
21	"Todo el rigor de la ley"	10 October 2022
Elena finds Tomás stealing from her employers' house, she refuses to become his accomplice. Mateo prevents the thief from escaping. Huicho accuses Elena of being his accomplice and reveals that he is Luis' real father. Elena is arrested, but fears that her son will never forgive her. Natalia proves to Fedra that she has Mariana's last will in her possession. Mateo threatens to fire Gabino when he discovers the abuses of power.
22	"Me voy a casar contigo"	11 October 2022
Fedra enters Natalia's room to find Mariana's will, when she does not find the document, she tells Gabino to help her get Natalia out of her way. Mateo learns that Melisa will no longer return to the house. Fedra withdraws the complaint against Elena. Ernesto confesses to Mateo that he had a daughter with Daniela. Fedra makes sure that Elena is rejected by her son Luis.
23	"Natalia no se puede morir"	12 October 2022
Ernesto asks Fedra to travel to Mexico City to talk to Daniela, Fedra decides to use her cousin's memory loss to her advantage. Natalia receives the payment for the sold pieces, Gabino uses the moment to fake a robbery and kill her. Fedra tries to get closer to Ernesto. Lalo guides Carmita to where Natalia is, he looks for Rodrigo to send help immediately.
24	"No te rindas"	13 October 2022
Fedra arrives at the hospital to meet Daniela again, she upsets her by assuring her that she was Ernesto's lover. Ernesto learns that Natalia was in a boarding school in Spain and thinks she may know Valeria. Lalo keeps saying Gabino's name. Mateo tells Fabiola that he is going to marry Melisa because he wants to be with his son. Mateo visits Natalia at the hospital, Rodrigo finds them. Hilario advises Mateo to be more discreet since the whole town may discover his feelings for Natalia.
25	"¡Se van a casar!"	14 October 2022
Days go by and Natalia improves little by little until she can walk. Mateo puts a stop to Melissa so that she stops doing things her way and takes him into account. Fedra pays Gabino to attack Natalia again. Fedra informs Natalia of Mateo's upcoming wedding to Melissa.
26	"Renunciar a nuestro amor"	17 October 2022
Natalia enters the cave where Lalo has the will, but does not find it. Inés' children discover Fedra and Gabino kissing. Bermudez visits Natalia to question her about the relationship between Valeria and Tony, she asks for his help to clear her name. Bermudez interrogates Fedra about the stolen jewels. Natalia complains to Mateo for hiding from her about his wedding to Melisa and decides to break up with him.
27	"Nadie se muere de amor"	18 October 2022
Daniela tells Ernesto of her desire to get to know each other again in order to recover her life. Valeria recognizes that as long as she continues to usurp Natalia's identity, she will have to give up love completely. Elena comments with Valeria about the incident that Inés' children had with Fedra and discovers that despite her threats, Fedra has not stopped seeing Gabino. Rodrigo swears to Natalia that he will never give up to win her heart.
28	"Mi boda con el hombre que tú amas"	19 October 2022
Natalia asks her godfather not to trust Gabino. Melisa arrives at the ranch ready to organize her wedding to Mateo, she asks Natalia to be a witness at her wedding, Elena asks Natalia not to fall into Melisa's game. Mateo almost causes an accident to Javier. Ernesto is interrogated for the death of "Valeria". Gabino tells Fedra that Inés' children will no longer bother her. Melisa confronts Natalia when she learns that she is still in a relationship with Mateo, and demands that she stay away from her fiancé. Fedra seeks an alliance with Melisa to make Natalia's life miserable.
29	"No hay latidos del corazón"	20 October 2022
Rodrigo announces to his family that he has won the scholarship to continue his medical studies. Melisa manipulates Father David to convince Mateo to marry her in church. Rodrigo questions Gabino if on the day of Natalia's accident he was near the scene. Fabiola causes an accident to Melisa. The doctor informs Melisa that after the accident she suffered, she lost her baby, Melisa decides not to tell Mateo. Hilario confronts Gabino after discovering that the day Natalia was assaulted he was not at the ranch. Melisa asks Fedra to help her keep her secret as she is determined to go through with the wedding plans.
30	"Mi corazón es de Natalia"	21 October 2022
Ernesto proposes to Natalia to start remodeling the ranch so that Daniela can work with her. Natalia takes pictures of Fedra with Gabino as proof of their relationship. Natalia meets Iker and Mateo gets jealous. Mateo makes it clear to Melisa that even though he is with her he will always think of Natalia.
31	"Nuestra hija murió"	24 October 2022
Fedra assures Melisa that Natalia always gets what she wants. Rodrigo remembers the time he spent with Miriam, according to his calculations and the resemblance, he could be the father of her son. Daniela learns that she had a daughter, but she died when she was in a coma. Ernesto decides to take Daniela as his date to Melissa's wedding with Mateo, where Daniela meets Natalia.
32	"Tu futura esposa te mintió"	25 October 2022
Esteban asks Natalia she knew Valeria Bernal, she assures him that she did and warns him that her friend is innocent of everything she is blamed for. Ernesto learns that Mateo and Natalia are romantically involved. Gabino gets involved with Adriana. Carmita asks Natalia not to say anything to Rodrigo about her fainting. Fedra is jealous of Daniela. Mateo receives an anonymous letter informing him that Melisa is lying to him.
33	"Tu bebé ya no existe"	26 October 2022
Melisa accuses Natalia of having sent the anonymous letter. Natalia finds out that Melisa lost her baby. Ernesto proposes to Daniela. Natalia confirms to Mateo that Melisa lost her baby.
34	"La prueba de tu mentira"	27 October 2022
Ernesto ignores Fedra's advances and prefers to go out with Daniela. Mateo laments the loss of his son. Elena reveals to Hilario that Gabino is Fedra's lover, so when he learns the truth he fires him from the ranch, Gabino assures Hilario that Fedra threatened him. Gabino informs Fedra that Hilario has already discovered their relationship. Bermudez begins to investigate Fedra for stealing jewelry. Mateo unmasks Melisa on their wedding day and reveals to all the guests that she lost her son, she accepts that she lied, but blames Natalia for the accident. Rodrigo learns that Mateo and Natalia are lovers.
35	"En el nombre del amor"	28 October 2022
Melisa blames Natalia for the death of her baby, she swears in front of everyone that she had nothing to do with the accident or the anonymous letter. Mateo accepts in front of Rodrigo that he and Natalia are in love. Fedra assures Melisa that she will help her separate Mateo and Natalia. Carmina and her husband file a report about Constanza's disappearance. Mateo suspects that Fabiola is to blame for Melisa's accident. Natalia wants to tell Mateo the truth about her identity. Alfonso and Fedra plan to separate Mateo and Natalia.
36	"¿Por qué tanto interés con Valeria?"	31 October 2022
Melisa goes to Fabiola's house to confront her about the death of her son and hits her. Father David finds Constanza, who has no memory of what happened the previous night. Ernesto wants to know more about Valeria and offers his help to clear her name. Natalia suspects that it was Fedra who stole the painting. Constanza suffers when she learns that a private video of her is circulating on social media. Alfonso discovers that Fedra stole Natalia's painting and warns her how dangerous it could be if she is caught.
37	"Adiós para siempre"	1 November 2022
Constanza reveals to her parents that she was drugged at the party. Natalia and Mateo show Fedra and Alfonso that Fabiola set Melisa up. Melisa says goodbye to Mateo, Ernesto chooses to travel to the city to make sure she is okay. Natalia tells Daniela her suspicions about Fedra's intrigues, Daniela remembers that the same thing happened between her and Ernesto some time ago. With the negative blood results, Carmita and Joaquín doubt that Constanza has told the truth and decide to cancel her quinceañera party.
38	"Valió la pena por tenerte aquí"	2 November 2022
Fedra discovers that her friend Tania stole from her. Melisa assures Mateo that she would rather be dead than not have him, Ernesto advises her to see a mental health professional. Melisa wants to file a complaint against Fabiola. Miriam will not allow Rodrigo to get close to their son Alexis. Daniela is sure that Fedra ruined her life with Ernesto. Natalia tells Daniela what her best friend did to her in Spain. Melisa celebrates that her plan to keep Mateo went perfectly. Natalia, seeing that Daniela is delicate, decides to stay over with her. Fedra takes advantage of the fact that she is with Ernesto to declare her feelings to him. Fedra feels Ernesto's rejection and is ready to take revenge.
39	"Todo mundo miente"	3 November 2022
Natalia begs Rodrigo to forgive her and Mateo. Ernesto complains to his cousin about Valeria's mistreatment and kicks him out of the house. Constanza breaks up with Lucio because she feels very confused by everything she experienced at the party. Ernesto wants to clear Valeria's name and asks Iker to be very discreet with the information. Constanza confirms that Eugenio was the one who abused her. Maggi refuses to confess to her parents what they did to her at Eugenio's party. Mateo decides to put some distance so that Melisa can start her healing process Daniela has a confrontation with Fedra. Daniela claims Ernesto for having lied to her and ends her engagement with him. Natalia cannot confess the truth to Mateo and shares with him that she has already found the will. Daniela asks Ernesto to take her to her daughter's grave, but he tells her that there are only ashes. Melisa is determined to report Fabiola. Fedra manages to manipulate Daniela.
40	"Todo puede suceder"	4 November 2022
As a way of attack, Fabiola plans to publish fake intimate photos of Natalia. Lucio firmly believes that Constanza needs his support, he asks Carmita's permission to be her boyfriend. Natalia writes a letter in which she confesses to Mateo everything that caused her to take her friend's identity. Carmita fears that Fabiola is involved in bad things and asks Rodrigo to follow her to find out how she earns so much money. Iker takes advantage of a moment alone with Natalia to congratulate her on her relationship with Mateo and confess his feelings.
41	"No me importa tu pasado"	7 November 2022
Natalia questions Mateo about the letter she wrote, he accepts her unconditionally without knowing that he read the wrong letter. Iker opens the complaint against Fabiola and unintentionally, the gossip spreads through the town. Constanza confesses to Rodrigo that she was a victim of abuse. Tony discovers that someone has registered as Natalia and plans to travel to Mexico. Maggi hears what was done to her and Constanza and confirms that it is not the first time that something like this has been done to women, but no complaint is ever filed due to the lack of evidence.
42	"¡Somos marido y mujer!"	8 November 2022
Rodrigo warns Eugenio's father about the parties and drug use. Eugenio hides the substances he used with Constanza and Maggi. Daniela helps Mateo organize a discreet ceremony to propose to Natalia and they get married immediately. Mara, Lalo's biological mother, arrives in town and remembers how 20 years ago she abandoned him at Carmita's house. Daniela helps Natalia and Mateo to enjoy their honeymoon. After learning the results of the tests that were done, Mara is willing to spend time with Lucio and Lalo, her sons.
43	"El que nada debe, nada teme"	9 November 2022
Fedra manages to convince Alfonso to let Gabino keep his job so he won't reveal her secret. Upon their return, Mateo and Natalia break the news that they got married, Alfonso complains to them for not asking permission, but Fedra reassures him for fear of reprisals from Natalia. Melisa presents the evidence that proves Fabiola's guilt in the incident that caused her to lose the baby. The doctor gives Carmita a diagnosis about the discomforts that she's been having. Mateo receives a package with revealing pictures of Natalia. Tamara meets with Constanza and Maggi regarding Eugenio's abuse, she makes it clear that she prefers to leave her past behind.
44	"Te convertiste en la princesa del castillo"	10 November 2022
Melisa arrives at Mateo's house to complain about his marriage, Natalia overhears and kicks her out of the house. Carmita gathers her children to tell them the diagnosis obtained; the whole family offers to donate their liver. Upon confirming that Valeria is pretending to be Natalia, Tony takes the opportunity to blackmail her into giving him connections in exchange for her silence. Tony tells Valeria how he found her photos and thanks to the description he realized that she was usurping the real Natalia's place. Natalia is forced to accept Tony's blackmail and get him potential clients so that he won't reveal his secret.
45	"Esto es una pesadilla"	11 November 2022
Rodrigo convinces Constanza to undergo a series of tests to make sure that the abuse does not have any unexpected consequences. Hilario finds Fedra with Gabino, Fedra warns him that if he continues to gossip with Alfonso, he himself could end up firing him. Tony tells Fabiola that he is near San Carlos and wants to see her; she offers him her apartment so that he can stay the days he will be in town. Hilario questions Elena about some of Alfonso's accusations involving Natalia and in order to defend her secret, she is forced to lie while still advocating for Mariana. The police recruits Natalia to work with Tony to facilitate his capture and clear Valeria's name.
46	"La mujer que más odio"	14 November 2022
Fedra tells Daniela that the time she was in town, Ernesto came on to her the same way he did 24 years ago. Upon finding out that no one was compatible to donate their liver to Carmita, Natalia and Elena go to the clinic to try to give Carmita hope. Fabiola learns of Natalia's willingness to donate a part of her liver and rejects the idea. Fabiola and Tony spend the night together. Ernesto visits the gallery where the painting he was going to buy from Natalia is exhibited to find out where it came from.
47	"Fedra y Gabino son amantes; ¡yo los vi!"	15 November 2022
Alfonso confronts Luis for talking about Fedra's supposed infidelity with Gabino; Natalia and Hilario come to defend him. Alfonso complains to Fedra about the rumors of her infidelity; she prefers to leave the farm because of the false accusations. Rodrigo informs Constanza that her attacker infected her with HPV. With the news that Natalia will be Carmita's donor, Fabiola decides to move out of the house. Daniela invites Alfonso to learn to live without needing a woman by his side.
48	"¡Soy una impostora para mi marido!"	16 November 2022
Talking with Daniela, Alfonso confesses that the jealousy he feels goes back to his grandfather who was teased for his grandmother's infidelities. Natalia discovers that Mateo never read her letter due to a confusion with a letter from Melisa. Despite Adri's recommendations, Melisa insists on getting Mateo back regardless of the fact that he is already married to Natalia. Natalia seeks out Elena to tell her finding and determine whether to confess the truth to Mateo; Daniela only hears that she considers herself an impostor. After thinking about the consequences of confessing her secret to Mateo, Natalia makes a decision.
49	"La estamos perdiendo"	17 November 2022
Tony arrives at the hospital to warn Natalia that he is aware of her every move. Father David thanks Natalia for her sacrifice, but warns her that it does not redeem her from her sins; she makes another confession. Gabino visits Alfonso to collect his settlement and blackmails him for his complicity in the theft of the painting. Lucio questions Constanza about her relationship with Eugenio; she does the same about his friendship with Azucena. Rodrigo reports that the operation was a success, but Natalia suffered an allergic reaction to the anesthesia that led her to fall into a coma.
50	"Se te acabaron tus días"	18 November 2022
Tony assures Fabiola that Gabino will not bother her anymore. Daniela and Alfonso learn that Natalia has fallen into a coma and rush to the hospital. Ernesto finds Fedra making out with Noel. Ernesto concludes that Natalia's signature was forged in order to sell the artwork. Mateo learns that his wife is in danger and Gabino tries to kill Natalia, but Iker stops him. Alfonso assures Daniela that seeing her so devastated, anyone would think she is Natalia's mother. Fedra gets angry with Gabino when she learns that he could not kill Natalia. Iker gives his statement about what happened with Natalia, Mateo finds him in her room and confronts him, he tells him that he is taking care of Natalia since someone tried to kill her.
51	"Estoy aterrada"	21 November 2022
Mateo stands guard in Natalia's room to make sure she doesn't suffer another attack; the next morning, she wakes up from her coma. Hilario confesses to Mateo his relationship with Mara and how he discovered that Lalo is his son. While Mateo and Natalia enjoy their happiness, Iker and Rodrigo see them and feel envious that they can't be with Natalia. Hilario begins to suspect that Gabino may have been behind the attacks against Natalia, and as he investigates with Iker, his suspicions increase.
52	"Hasta que la muerte nos separe"	22 November 2022
Natalia asks Bermudez to lower the hospital's guardianship in order to speed up her filtration in Tony's operation. Ernesto shows Natalia the papers of the painting with the fake signature, she is sure that Fedra is behind all this. Fedra returns home to win back Alfonso's love, he prefers to enjoy his freedom. After hearing what is said about Daniela and Alfonso, Fedra decides to put a stop to it. To avoid any more secrets between them, Mateo confesses to Rodrigo that Lalo is his half-brother.
53	"Ya sabes lo que tienes que hacer"	23 November 2022
Tony visits Natalia in the hospital and accidentally calls her Valeria, surprising Mateo. Alfonso considers ending his marriage to Fedra. Gabino threatens Fedra to give him more money, and if she refuses, he is ready to report her to the authorities. Mateo confronts Fabiola with evidence about her occupation of selling scantily clad photographs.
54	"Es hora de irme"	24 November 2022
Fedra complains to Daniela for organizing Sofía's birthday party without her permission and lets her know that she is no longer welcome in her home. Rodrigo celebrates that he regained Natalia and Mateo's friendship, and congratulates them on their relationship. Hilario confesses to Elena that he is Lalo's real father. Daniela tells Alfonso that she is leaving and thanks him for letting her live in his farm. Ernesto and Fedra get jealous when they see Daniela with Alfonso. Constanza learns that Lalo is Lucio's half brother.
55	"Eres la reina de la mentira"	25 November 2022
Fedra goes into Daniela's room and steals the watch Ernesto gave her and sells it on the black market. Natalia accuses Fedra of being behind the attempts on her life. Tony offers Fabiola a new job within his organization. To find out if Alexis is his son, Rodrigo performs a DNA test, Miriam asks Rodrigo to stay away because he may never see Alexis again.
56	"Ya sé toda la verdad"	28 November 2022
Fedra manages to enter Alfonso's bedroom to seduce him. Bermudez and Lieutenant Alvarez, explain to Natalia the plan to apprehend Tony. After the delay about their daughter's ashes, Ernesto confesses to Daniela that Valeria died recently. Hilario confesses to Carmita that he is Lalo's real father. Daniela complains to Fedra for not taking care of her daughter when she was born.
57	"Ahora sí cavaste tu tumba"	29 November 2022
Natalia informs Mateo that Tony offered to run the hotel bar. Rodrigo receives the DNA test results that confirm that Alexis is not his son. Alfonso visits Daniela to offer his support now that she is done with Ernesto, but he has other intentions. Rodrigo asks Lucio to become his accomplice. Fedra notices the growing relationship between Alfonso and Daniela so she decides to poison her. Fabiola alerts Tony about the trap that is set to arrest him.
Part 2
58	"¡Estás viva!"	30 November 2022
Tony manages to escape from the authorities and the agent assures Natalia that without the merchandise there is no crime to prosecute, both confirm that Fabiola is Tony's accomplice. Rodrigo informs Mateo and Alfonso that they had to pump Daniela's stomach. Tony reveals Natalia's real identity to Fabiola. Daniela confesses to Natalia that she no longer has the will to live. Alfonso admits that he has feelings for Daniela, but is afraid to ask Fedra for a divorce. During the inauguration of the hotel, Natalia is surprised to see the real Natalia arrive.
59	"¡Ella es una impostora!"	1 December 2022
Natalia agrees to clear Valeria's name in exchange for her confessing the truth and telling the reasons why she usurped her identity. Natalia gets emotional when she remembers how happy she was before her mother died, but when she sees Fedra she does not forget the hatred she has for her. Valeria confesses to Daniela the reason why she took Natalia's place. Valeria is ready to confess the truth; however, the police arrive and arrest her for identity theft.
60	"Me rompiste el corazón"	2 December 2022
Valeria tries to explain to Mateo her reasons for lying, but he does not want to listen to her. Valeria gives her statement and reveals what happened the day of the accident. Mateo renounces Valeria's love because he feels betrayed. Natalia warns Alfonso and Fedra that once she recovers Mariana's inheritance, she will leave them in the street.
61	"No sé quién eres"	5 December 2022
Daniela looks for Mateo to convince him to talk to Valeria and listen to the reasons why she had to lie. All of Valle del Angel learns that the real Natalia is back. Mateo visits Valeria in jail, she assures him that she was willing to confess the whole truth once Tony was arrested, but he does not believe her and ends his relationship with her. Rodrigo asks Gaby to be his girlfriend. Ernesto finds out that Valeria Bernal pretended to be Natalia Ugarte and asks Iker to help him get Valeria's hair, to do a DNA test and check if she is his daughter. Rodrigo learns that he appreciated the real Natalia and befriends her. Father David visits Natalia and assures her that he does not agree that he has sent Valeria to jail, but she assures him that she is ready to take revenge on the person who usurped her identity.
62	"No sabes cuánto te odio"	6 December 2022
Rodrigo visits Valeria to tell her that he has her support. Valeria gives Iker her version of events; when he learns who her guardians were, he confirms his suspicions that she is Ernesto's daughter. Natalia gives her statement. With the arrival of the real Natalia, Rodrigo begins to doubt if he really wants to be with Gaby or if he wants to try to make Natalia fall in love with him. Valeria tries to talk to Natalia about the friendship they had, but Natalia tells her that after her actions, she feels nothing but hatred and resentment for her.
63	"Por las buenas o por las malas"	7 December 2022
Rodrigo invites Natalia to dinner, she takes advantage of his kindness and uses him to get information about Valeria. Alfonso complains to Natalia for trying to sell everything, she offers him a small percentage of the proceeds to get him out of her way. Fedra proposes to Alfonso to put all the property in his name to prevent Natalia from selling it and keeping the proceeds.
64	"¡Estás embarazada!"	8 December 2022
Rodrigo tells Valeria the news that she is pregnant, she asks him to keep her secret. Fedra discusses with Melisa the strange relationship Valeria has forged with Ernesto and Daniela, both decide it is best to keep Valeria away from Mateo and Ernesto. Melisa slaps Valeria for lying to Mateo. Melisa realizes that her love for Mateo has become an obsession and decides to move away and change her life.
65	"Llegó la hora de ponerla en su lugar"	9 December 2022
Ernesto receives confirmation that Valeria is his daughter, Iker advises him to tell her the truth because he knows that if he doesn't, Valeria will reject his support. Valeria and Natalia prepare for the identity theft trial. During her testimony, Natalia assures that Valeria always coveted her life and the luxuries she surrounded herself with, so much so that she took advantage of the moment to get hold of them. Valeria confesses how she realized that Natalia was involved in Tony's illicit business.
66	"¡Eres nuestra hija!"	12 December 2022
Fabiola tries to convince Mateo that her disappearance was thanks to the dealings between Valeria and Tony. Mateo worries about Valeria when he sees her approaching the mill, she takes the opportunity to make him understand that the lies she told him were not malicious. Ernesto confesses to Daniela that he found the daughter they thought was dead, and it is Valeria. Natalia refuses to give Rodrigo a chance because of his social class. Ernesto and Daniela reveal to Valeria that they are her real parents.
67	"El día más feliz de mi vida"	13 December 2022
Ernesto assures Valeria that he has not been the best father, but is willing to make up for lost time, Valeria asks for time to assimilate. Natalia confronts Fedra and Alfonso for forging the painting and demands that Fedra return the proceeds. Fabiola offers her help to Natalia to unite and thus finish with Valeria, she shows her photos of Valeria which will be of great help.
68	"Es demasiado tarde"	14 December 2022
Ernesto decides to spare Valeria more suffering and proposes to Natalia to buy the farm at a higher price. Fedra learns that Ernesto is Valeria's real father. Daniela tells Ernesto that she will never be able to forgive the pain to which he exposed Valeria, so they will never be able to be together again. Iker wonders if he can bring himself to confess his feelings to Valeria. Ernesto tells Valeria that he wants to give her his last name. Rodrigo discovers Fabiola's lies and decides to threaten her so that she will change and stop abusing her parents.
69	"Vamos a hacer las cosas bien"	15 December 2022
At the end of the trial hearing, Valeria feels bad and worries everyone; Natalia mocks her role as a victim. Valeria approaches Alfonso to apologize for making him believe she was his daughter Natalia. Natalia gives her lawyer the photos of Valeria so she can use them to her advantage during the trial. After learning that Valeria is pregnant, Fedra imagines how she could use them to her advantage.
70	"¡Voy a tener un bebé!"	16 December 2022
Natalia informs Mateo about Valeria's pregnancy, but assures him that there is a possibility that the baby is not his. Mateo confronts Valeria for hiding her pregnancy from him. Tired of Fedra's mistreatment, Elena confronts her for firing Inés and takes the opportunity to tell her the truth after she resigns. Now that there is no service in the house, Natalia demands that Fedra take the place as housekeeper. Rodrigo surprises Gaby with a romantic dinner.
71	"Me enamoré de Valeria"	19 December 2022
Eugenio tests Lucio's loyalty to see if he can trust him to expand Tony's business. Mateo receives a job offer in another state. Iker confesses to Mateo his feelings for Valeria as well as his intention to ask her out when the trial is over. Alfonso confronts Natalia for the attitude she has assumed since her return. Fedra wants to destroy Mariana's will.
72	"Vengo a exigir mis derechos"	20 December 2022
Constanza records an anonymous video to denounce Eugenio's aggressions and warn other girls to be careful with him. Elena confesses to Hilario and Mateo that she already knew that Valeria was not Natalia. Daniela accuses Fedra of always being in love with Ernesto, Fedra responds with a threat.
73	"El odio envenena el alma"	21 December 2022
Daniela asks for Alfonso's help to stop Natalia from kicking her and Valeria out of the hotel. Mateo receives Valeria and Daniela at his house. Fedra discovers Natalia's betrayal when she finds out that she told everyone that Alfonso has feelings for Daniela. Iker gives Valeria a clue about her attacker and confirms her suspicions that it was Gabino on Fedra's orders.
74	"Ayúdate que yo te ayudaré"	22 December 2022
Ernesto meets a former co-worker who is accompanied by Tania, she recognizes him from her conversations with Fedra. Natalia begins to seduce Gabino to ensure his loyalty and carry out her revenge against Valeria. Iker discovers Gabino pasting fake photos of Valeria all over town. Fedra interrogates Ernesto about the photo of him with Tania, once she knows the location, she begins her revenge. Gabino is arrested.
75	"¿El amor lo puede todo?"	23 December 2022
Constanza celebrates her Quinceañera party. After Constanza's party, Mateo and Valeria kiss but Valeria is sure that Mateo will not get back together with her. Fedra tells Alfonso that she will travel to New York, he complains about her excessive expenses, and end up threatening each other.
76	"¡Vengo a testificar!"	26 December 2022
Mateo and Valeria see their baby at the ultrasound appointment, where Mateo is cold and distant when dealing with Valeria. Before the trial, Hilario begins to feel ill, so Rodrigo asks him not to go to the trial, leaving Valeria without the most important testimony of the trial. Before the judge ends the presentation of testimony, Mateo arrives to cover for his father and testify on Valeria's behalf. Fedra finds and confronts Tania, tries to convince her to return; achieving nothing, Fedra attacks her.
77	"¡Culpable!"	27 December 2022
Miriam's mother seeks out Rodrigo secretly to give him the news that Alexis, his son is torn between life and death; Rodrigo decides to travel to Argentina immediately. Alfonso confronts Fedra, as he is sure that she has been behind the attacks against Valeria and Natalia. The judge determines that Valeria is guilty of the crimes she is accused of and she is sentenced to one year in prison.
78	"A partir de hoy es una presidiaria"	28 December 2022
Mateo finds a lawyer to help him fight for custody of his baby; the lawyer advises him to seek full custody, taking advantage of Valeria's imprisonment. By accident, Fabiola meets Eugenio's father who turns out to be an admirer of her adult content. Valeria returns to her cell and is greeted by her new cellmate.
79	"Hacerle la vida de cuadritos"	29 December 2022
Dalila sees Valeria's ultrasound photo and mocks her; Valeria tries to defend herself but ends up in more trouble. Happy after having taken care of Valeria, Natalia demands from Alfonso and Fedra a monthly payment for part of the hotel profits as well as the reimbursement of the goods sold. Alfonso threatens Fedra to sell her jewelry to avoid imprisonment. Faced with Dalila's threats to Valeria, Maura declares herself Valeria's protector thanks to the fact that someone paid her to do so.
80	"No me quedaré de brazos cruzados"	30 December 2022
Valeria thanks Iker for sending her Maura's help. Fedra confirms to Ernesto Alfonso's interest in Daniela and Ernesto threatens her to stop messing with Daniela. Dalila takes advantage of the fact that Maura is not around to leave Valeria without food. Iker decides to request a reduction in Valeria's sentence but is denied, putting her at greater risk.
81	"Accidente provocado"	2 January 2023
Constanza admits to her parents that she was a victim of sexual abuse. A prison guard throws Valeria from a height. Fedra interrogates Alfonso about the business he has with Ernesto, he refuses to tell her anything about it.
82	"¿Quién le hizo daño a Valeria?"	3 January 2023
The guard who threw Valeria down manages to blame Dalila and make her pay for her crime. Natalia discovers that Fedra's jewelry is also stolen and uses it as blackmail so as not to report her for the theft of her painting. Mateo manages to go into Valeria's room and upon confessing his love, Valeria wakes up. Fedra demands explanations from Afonso for the sale of the property; he admits that he no longer wants to be with her and as soon as the sale is finalized, he will file a divorce.
83	"Mi hijo va a nacer en la cárcel"	4 January 2023
Iker and Mateo visit the president of the Superior Chamber of Justice to try to appeal Valeria's sentence and have her released as soon as their child is born. Lucio visits Carmita and Joaquín to ask their permission to be Constanza's boyfriend. Lucio's father expresses his fear that Eugenio will retaliate against his son and Constanza for being involved in his capture. Valeria learns that her appeal was denied. Natalia makes Mateo believe that she had an accident in order to get closer to him and thus win him over.
84	"¿Qué hace Natalia junto a Mateo?"	5 January 2023
Mateo spends the night trying to make Natalia feel better, but falls asleep, the next day Elena sees them leaving his house. Valeria learns that someone edited the security camera video of the day she was attacked in jail. Natalia recognizes that she has feelings for Mateo. Fabiola is seduced by Leopoldo's money. Mateo rejects Natalia's expensive gift and he confesses to Rodrigo that he did not believe her about the accident she had.
85	"La venganza apenas comienza"	6 January 2023
Valeria confronts Iker about his feelings for her; despite rejecting him, he asks for time before making a decision. Tony calls Natalia to follow up on his plan for revenge against Valeria. Ernesto visits Valeria to confirm if the rumors are true about Mariana's will where she leaves all her fortune to Natalia. Ernesto is disappointed that Alfonso is trying to steal Natalia's property by trying to sell it and threatens him to confess the truth to her.
86	"¡A la celda de castigo!"	9 January 2023
Gabino meets with Celia, the orderly who attacked Valeria, and complains to her about the aggressiveness of her attack, he insists that she continue to make Valeria's life miserable. Dalila takes advantage of Maura's distraction to attack Ivana, Valeria defends her and they end up fighting in the courtyard. While Elena and Hilario are walking around the farm, Tomás attacks Hilario and kidnaps Elena. Tomás comments to Elena that he will take advantage of the fact that he lives with Hilario to ask for ransom; Elena realizes that this is a revenge against her.
87	"¡Mateo y yo hicimos el amor!"	10 January 2023
Natalia takes advantage of the incident with Elena to search thoroughly in Mateo's room; she steals a picture of him. Tomás calls Hilario and demands a large sum of money so that he can see Elena again, Luis recognizes his voice. Natalia visits Valeria in jail to boast that she is already Mateo's girlfriend, showing her the photo she took from his house as evidence. Mateo comments with Ernesto and Daniela about Gabino's apprehension, Daniela links him to Fedra and realizes that she has always been behind the misfortunes that have befallen her.
88	"Debe estar en el más allá"	11 January 2023
Valeria dreams that she sees Mateo kissing Natalia as she fears that she has stolen Mateo's love. Natalia visits Gabino to confirm if it was Fedra who ordered the attacks against Valeria while usurping her identity. Despite reaching an agreement with Hilario, Tomás goes ahead with his plan to kill Elena. Noel confronts Fedra for ordering the attacks against Valeria and demands that she not look for him again, leaving her without any accomplices to help her in her plans.
89	"Visita conyugal"	12 January 2023
Thanks to Valeria's accusations, the prison director is able to identify Celia as the presumed culprit in the attack on her. Mateo and Luis manage to rescue Elena. Valeria learns that she has a conjugal visit, Iker prepares a romantic and private dinner for her. Valeria asks Elena if it is true that Natalia and Mateo are going out, Elena confirms the news. The lawyer manages to dismiss the evidence against Gabino so that he can go free despite Iker's evidence.
90	"¡Ya nació el bebé!"	13 January 2023
Mateo visits Valeria to ask for authorization for a trust fund for his son, after which she goes into labor. Rodrigo questions Mateo about his relationship with Natalia and whether he still has feelings for Valeria. Iker and Mateo are waiting to visit Valeria and end up arguing over their love for her.
91	"¡No puedo dejar a mi hijo!"	16 January 2023
Natalia fills Mateo with gifts for his son, he makes it clear to her that their relationship can never become a romantic one. Valeria is forced to give up her son with Mateo, while she finishes her sentence. Natalia visits Mateo to meet Bernardo; left alone with the baby, she makes evident her jealousy to get Mateo's attention.
92	"Vamos a intentarlo"	17 January 2023
Natalia looks for Mateo to go out, but he rejects her to spend time with his son. Dalila makes fun of Valeria's misfortunes again, but this time she defends herself. Carmita and Joaquín confront Fabiola for being with Eugenio's father, despise her and take her out of the family. Iker takes advantage of Valeria's release from jail to ask her to be his girlfriend, she accepts and kisses him.
93	"Dejar el pasado atrás"	18 January 2023
Tony asks Natalia to return to Europe, she is not willing to lose Mateo, he threatens her saying that she is also a criminal. Mateo finds Valeria making out with Iker and is jealous that he has lost her. Natalia makes it clear to Valeria that she is willing to do anything to keep her away from her son, Valeria gives her a warning. Natalia and Fedra take advantage of the fact that Valeria is traveling for a few days to start their attack and get rid of her.
94	"¿Dónde está mi hijo?"	19 January 2023
Fedra and Natalia carry out the plan against Valeria. When Bernardo is nowhere to be found, Mateo goes to the police, where he is told that it is most likely a kidnapping. Valeria officially becomes Daniela and Ernesto's daughter; she encourages Daniela to reconcile with Ernesto. Daniela surprises and proposes to Ernesto. Fedra abandons Bernardo in a dumpster. Natalia and Fedra enjoy the success of their plan, but don't realize that they are being overheard by Jazmín, the maid. Valeria blames Mateo for Bernardo's disappearance.
95	"Voy a recuperar a nuestro bebé"	20 January 2023
Natalia arrives at the hotel to offer her support, Valeria blames her for Bernardo's disappearance. Hilario convinces Alfonso to take the DNA test again and advises him not to share his plans with Fedra. Natalia fears that Valeria will discover that she is behind Bernardo's disappearance. Rodrigo wants to arrive in New York as Gaby's husband and they take advantage of the proposal to get married by civil ceremony.
96	"Te vas a morir de la culpa"	23 January 2023
Sergio, upon learning that Fabiola rejected him, decides to take revenge on her. Natalia assures Alfonso that she is the victim of his hatred for her mother's supposed infidelity, but the only thing she has asked for throughout her life is love. Valeria faints because she is worried about not finding her son. Clara realizes that the baby her daughter found is Bernardo, Hilario's grandson; she looks for him to confess the truth. Fedra receives an anonymous letter.
97	"¡Encontré a mi hijo!"	24 January 2023
Fedra tries to discover the blackmailer who sent her the anonymous note, she questions Gabino and when she sees that it was not him, she fears that someone else knows her secrets. Mateo, Rodrigo and Hilario manage to enter Lula's house to rescue Bernardo; they take him to Valeria. Natalia questions Fedra about the crimes she has committed. Fabiola decides that the best way to avenge her abuse is to charge all the men she finds in her path.
98	"Quiero estar contigo"	25 January 2023
Bermúdez interrogates Fedra about the disappearance of Bernardo, she says she is innocent of any assumption. Concerned for his grandson's well-being, Ernesto proposes to Valeria that they move to the city while they find the person responsible for the kidnapping. Natalia tries to seduce Mateo, he rejects her, but she begs him for a chance. Daniela thanks Ernesto for all his efforts to keep their family safe. When Mateo learns of Valeria's plans, he forbids her to take his son.
99	"Natalia sí es mi hija"	26 January 2023
Alfonso offers Natalia a deal to solve their financial problems. Ernesto asks Mateo to reconsider his relationship with Natalia since it is as harmful as the relationship between Alfonso and Fedra. Mateo objects to Iker being godfather to his son and threatens Valeria with inviting Natalia. Alfonso receives the results of the DNA test and when he confirms that Natalia is his daughter, he goes crazy remembering the way he treated her.
100	"¡Mi papá está muerto!"	27 January 2023
Natalia announces that she will travel to Buenos Aires, Bermúdez suspects that she will meet with Tony and sends notice to Commander Álvarez to follow up. Alfonso realizes the mistake he was in, visits Mariana's studio to apologize for his insecurities. Alfonso confronts Fedra for all the lies that changed his life, Fedra takes a gun and, while struggling, shoots him. Natalia finds Alfonso in a very bad state, he wakes up to say goodbye to her and dies in her arms.
101	"La heredera universal"	30 January 2023
Fedra arrives at the hospital worried about Alfonso, Natalia blames her for having manipulated him all his life. The police start the investigations for Alfonso's death, the service people declare that he did not seem depressed but upset with Fedra. Valeria, Daniela and Ernesto attend the funeral at Natalia's house, Natalia kicks out Valeria. Ernesto plans to look for Alfonso's heiress and offer to buy her part of the partnership, otherwise, he will be forced to dissolve it since he does not want to deal with Natalia or Fedra.
102	"Cuenta conmigo"	31 January 2023
Natalia convinces Mateo to allow her to live in her house so that she can keep an eye on Fedra's movements with her house. Elena and Hilario tell Natalia that there is a will in which her mother mentions that she is the universal heiress. Ernesto wants to buy Fedra's property from the Moncada family, but when she refuses, he has no choice but to sell his half. Valeria finds out what Fedra is doing to Natalia and visits her to offer her help.
103	"Él no pudo quitarse la vida"	1 February 2023
Iker tells Valeria that he has received an important job offer, but he needs to know where they are headed as a couple to determine whether or not to accept. Father David confesses to Natalia what he talked about with Alfonso when he received the results of the DNA test, he assures her that it was not suicide. Gabino shows Fedra the clothes she left in the garbage can, explains his theory about Alfonso's death. Natalia asks Bermudez to exhume Alfonso's body to corroborate that it was not suicide; she blames Fedra for killing him.
104	"Atente a las consecuencias"	2 February 2023
Iker demands Mateo not to speak to Valeria again as he had done, the discussion ends in threats. Natalia tries to spend time with Mateo but he rejects her. Ernesto tells the employees that Mateo will be the one to make decisions about the ranch on his behalf, Fedra does the same but designates Gabino. Natalia complains to Mateo for seeing Valeria at Hilario's house, he makes it clear to her that her claims have no place since there is nothing more than friendship between them.
105	"Nos ganó el amor"	3 February 2023
Fabiola begins her revenge against Sergio denouncing all the illegal acts he has committed, such as stealing from the government and helping Eugenio in his escape. Natalia tells Tony that she is living with Mateo, he is furious and threatens her not to be unfaithful. Valeria takes advantage of the fact that Mateo accompanied her to the hotel to steal a kiss.
106	"Nada ni nadie nos volverá a separar"	6 February 2023
Iker defends his relationship with Valeria to his parents, who reject him for having made that decision. Fabiola confirms that she is pregnant, but does not want to have the baby. Gabino informs Fedra that Alfonso's body will be exhumed, she fears that the truth will be discovered since she had only prepared to contest the will. Tony returns to Valle del Ángel ready to kill Mateo, since it is said that Natalia is his girlfriend.
107	"Te prefiero muerto"	7 February 2023
Despite the evidence that Natalia is not with Mateo, Tony realizes that she no longer loves him, but Natalia is already planning her revenge. Fabiola goes to a health clinic to terminate her pregnancy. Fedra demands lodging for Gabino, Ernesto tries to stop her, but she accuses him of committing fraud and demands to review the accounts. Hilario refuses to lose Elena and shares his concern with Father David, he advises him to confess his love to her once and for all. Mateo and Valeria celebrate Bernardo's baptism, but Natalia is determined to kill Mateo to prevent him from being happy with Valeria.
108	"¿Quieres casarte conmigo?"	8 February 2023
Iker interrupts Bernardo's party to ask Valeria to be his wife in front of his family and friends. Gabino tells Fedra about Daniela fainting, with her reaction he realizes that she had something to do with it. Mateo tells Valeria that he still loves her and begs her to reject Iker's marriage proposal.
109	"Mi corazón nunca va a ser tuyo"	9 February 2023
Mateo tells Valeria and Ernesto that he moved to a hotel to avoid gossip about his relationship with Natalia. Natalia comforts Mateo over Valeria and Iker's impending engagement, Gabino takes advantage and takes pictures of them. Iker insists on his marriage proposal and Valeria reveals her feelings and rejects the proposal. Valeria meets with Mateo at their special place to clear up any misunderstandings and get back together.
110	"Esto se tiene que acabar"	10 February 2023
Valeria discusses with Mateo all about the relationship between Tony and Natalia, and they decide to stay apart in order to catch him. Fedra celebrates Daniela's weakened physical condition, knowing that it causes suffering in Ernesto. Mateo sets a trap for Natalia by giving her a chance at a relationship. Eugenio and his friends break into Constanza's house ready to carry out their revenge.
111	"Siempre estarás en nuestro corazón"	13 February 2023
Lalo comes out of his room to defend Constanza without realizing that Eugenio has a weapon. Joaquín manages to catch Eugenio as he flees the scene of the crime. Bermudez apprehends Leopoldo and Sergio as they attempt to flee the country. Despite the doctors' efforts, Rodrigo informs his family that Lalo is on the verge of death. Fedra informs Gabino that her employee is blackmailing her. Carmita and her family gather at the hospital to say goodbye to Lalo.
112	"Voy a hacer que pague"	14 February 2023
With Lalo's death, Eugenio is formally charged with murder, his friends are charged for their complicity. Bermudez investigates in the bar about who sold Eugenio's friends the drugs, due to his attempts to flee, the police manage to identify Gabino as the supplier. Rodrigo blames himself for the death of Lalo. Gabino decides to poison the ranch's milk. Carmita and Joaquín say their last goodbyes to Lalo. The detective confirms suspicions that Alfonso was murdered. Natalia visits her parents' grave to swear that Fedra will pay for all her crimes.
113	"Estamos en guerra"	15 February 2023
Fabiola visits Sergio and Leopoldo to tell them that she was the one who denounced them. Constanza runs into Fabiola and asks her to return home. Fedra blames Mateo for the losses at the ranch and demands that he be fired, Ernesto tells her that Gabino will no longer be able to stay at the hotel and demands his dismissal since he is accused of drug trafficking. Knowing that Natalia is involved with Tony, Mateo informs her about Gabino's arrest and the investigation related to Lalo's death.
114	"Vigila sus movimientos"	16 February 2023
Mateo and Valeria meet with Bermudez to offer their help to catch Natalia, Gabino and Tony. Constanza meets with Eugenio's other victims to form an association to help other victims of abuse. Natalia visits Fedra with a viper in hand to warn her that she will not rest until she makes her pay for all the misdeeds she has committed, including the murder of her father. Ernesto discovers that the milk was ruined on purpose and he forces Fedra to remove Gabino as her proxy.
115	"El testamento de Mariana"	17 February 2023
During her date with Gabino, Fabiola begins to feel sick and goes to the hospital; Rodrigo finds out and notifies the family. Ernesto and Valeria implement a control on Daniela's food to prevent her from being poisoned again; Fedra pressures her accomplice to continue giving Daniela the drops. Fabiola confesses to Constanza that she identifies with her, since the tragedy of abuse brought them together. Eduardo proposes to Daniela. Valeria decides to pack the things that Lalo had in Hilario's house, but discovers that the papers he was playing with are actually Mariana's will. Natalia is not thrilled with the idea that Valeria has found the will.
116	"Yo soy la única dueña"	20 February 2023
The notary validates Mariana's will, making Natalia the heir to the Moncada properties. Valeria convinces Daniela to have the wedding of her dreams no matter her age. Valeria warns Mateo that Tony will soon show up when he sees Natalia in love with him. Having validated her mother's will, Natalia brags to Fedra about having stripped her of everything she had and forcibly removes her from her home.
117	"Me quedé sin nada"	21 February 2023
Natalia decides to tear Fedra's clothes so that she will have nothing to wear. Hilario confesses his love to Elena; when she refuses to live together without being married, he proposes to her. Upon discovering that Natalia has recovered her mother's inheritance, Tony forces her to hire Gabino so that he can keep an eye on her movements. Tania is ready to take revenge on Fedra. Natalia believes that Valeria set her up and in reality she had hidden her mother's will.
118	"El dueño y señor de todo"	22 February 2023
Natalia reveals to Ernesto that she will fight for the ranch to give it to Mateo. Ernesto confronts Mateo for playing with Valeria's feelings. Hilario surprises Elena by getting married that same day. Ernesto manages to contact Tania and seeing that she also wants Fedra to pay for her crimes, he proposes to join forces. Natalia thanks Mateo with a kiss for the security measures implemented, Tony secretly watches them.
119	"Fedra ya tuvo su merecido"	23 February 2023
Ernesto is determined to sell his part of the ranch to Natalia because he doesn't want to get involved with people in drug trafficking. Fedra attacks Daniela, she defends herself and accidentally causes a medicine cabinet to fall on Fedra. Daniela concludes that it was Fedra who tried to poison her. Fedra is arrested for the attempted murder against Daniela. Natalia asks Gabino to escape since he will be imprisoned. Mateo begs Gabino to surrender, but Gabino falls into the shredder. Tony hits Mateo and threatens to kill him. Fedra confirms to Natalia that she murdered Alfonso and they both express their hatred for each other.
120	"Vamos a vivir nuestro amor"	24 February 2023
Tony contacts Natalia to let her know that he is holding Mateo hostage. Tony asks Natalia to kill Mateo as a proof of love. Mateo apologizes to Natalia for using her to stop Tony. Dalila torments Fedra in prison. Gabino is humiliated by his cellmates. Fabiola accepts her baby and Carmita and Joaquín embrace her for her change. Valeria visits Natalia in prison, she asks for forgiveness for all the harm she caused her, Valeria hugs her. Valeria finally manages to unite her life with Mateo's, both swear eternal love to each other and her now husband confesses his great secret.
