= ¡Qué despadre! =

- Theatrical release poster
- Directed by: Pedro Pablo Ibarra
- Written by: Adriana Pelusi; Rafael Gaytán
- Produced by: Mauricio Oscoy; Guido Rud; Concepcion Taboada
- Starring: Mauricio Ochmann; Fiona Palomo; Sandra Echeverría
- Cinematography: Juan Pablo Ojeda
- Edited by: Camilo Abadía
- Music by: Raul Vizzi
- Production company: Spectrum Films
- Distributed by: Videocine
- Release date: February 17, 2022
- Running time: 97 minutes
- Country: Mexico
- Language: Spanish
- Box office: $2,681,505

¡Qué despadre! (lit. 'What a mess!') is a 2022 Mexican comedy film directed by Pedro Pablo Ibarra and written by Adriana Pelusi and Rafael Gaytán. Starring Mauricio Ochmann, Fiona Palomo, and Sandra Echeverría. It premiered on February 17, 2022, in Mexican theaters.

== Synopsis ==
Pedro is a forty-year-old single man who lives the nightlife from party to party and sleeps during the day. But his life will change when Alin, a very affectionate young woman, assures him that she is looking for her father and apparently, there is a high probability that it is him.

== Cast ==
The actors participating in this film are:

- Mauricio Ochmann as Pedro
- Fiona Palomo as Aline
- Sandra Echeverría as Helena
- Juan Diego Covarrubias as Gabriel
- Mauricio Barrientos as Montemayor
- Paly Duval as Lorena
- Ana Claudia Talancón as Paula
- Diana Bracho as Ofelia
- Concepción Márquez as Francisca Medina
- Héctor Suárez as Dr. Mauricio Oscoy Galindo
- Magali Boysselle
- Ricardo Fastlicht
- Anabel Ferreira
- Diego Klein

== Reception ==
=== Critical reception ===
Oscar Velázquez from CineFX highlights the excellent acting work of Fiona Palomo and that she feels fresh for this type of film, but also criticizes the performances of the secondary characters, calling them "not very expressive", in addition to commenting on their little development. On the other hand, Super User from Cinexplicación called the film cliché and predictable, but that doesn't make the film bad, it just makes it simpler and lighter, it also highlights Fiona Palomo's acting debut, calling it clean and charismatic.

=== Accolades ===
Year	Award	Category	Recipient	Result	Ref
2023	Canacine Awards	Best Film	¡Qué despadre!	Nominated	
2023	Canacine Awards	Best Director	Pitipol Ybarra	Nominated	
2023	Canacine Awards	Best Newcomer - Female	Fiona Palomo	Won	
2023	Diosas de Plata	Best Supporting Actor	Juan Diego Covarrubias	Nominated	
2023	Diosas de Plata	Best Newcomer - Female	Fiona Palomo	Won	
2023	Diosas de Plata	Best Music	Raúl Vizzi & Luca Ortega	Nominated	
