= Guardián de mi vida =

- Genre: Telenovela
- Based on: Amor en custodia by Enrique Estevanez & Marcela Citterio
- Developed by: Pablo Ferrer García-Travesí; Santiago Pineda Aliseda
- Written by: Hugo Moreno Cano; Claudia Vázquez
- Directed by: Alan Coton; Carlos Alcázar
- Starring: Silvia Navarro; Daniel Arenas; Paulina Goto; Diego Klein; Sergio Sendel; Alejandro Camacho; Kimberly Dos Ramos
- Theme music composer: Jorge Eduardo Murguía; Mauricio L. Arriaga
- Opening theme: "Quiero enamorarme" by Vanesa Martín
- Ending theme: "Cuídame de mí" by Paulina Goto
- Composers: Eduardo Pérez G.; Armando López Pérez
- Country of origin: Mexico
- Original language: Spanish
- No. of seasons: 1
- No. of episodes: 77

Production
- Executive producer: Juan Osorio
- Producers: Ignacio Ortíz Castillo; Miriam Osorio Avalos
- Cinematography: Adrián Patiño
- Editors: Norma Ramírez Ortiz; Fernando Rodríguez; Socorro Manrique; Ioma Carmona
- Camera setup: Multi-camera
- Production company: TelevisaUnivision

Original release
- Network: Univision
- Release: 18 May – 2 September 2026

Related
- Amor en custodia (2005); Amor en custodia (2009); Amores verdaderos (2012)

Guardián de mi vida (English: Guardian of My Life) is a Mexican telenovela produced by Juan Osorio for TelevisaUnivision. It is based on the 2005 Argentine telenovela Amor en custodia, created by Marcela Citterio. The series stars Silvia Navarro, Daniel Arenas, Paulina Goto and Diego Klein. It aired on Univision from 18 May 2026 to 2 September 2026. In Mexico, the series premiered on Las Estrellas on 29 June 2026.

== Plot ==
Sofía Peralta-Avitia, CEO of a family-owned business empire, is in a loveless marriage with Gonzalo Balmori-Ricci, an emotionally irresponsible man who is unfaithful to her. One day, Franco Gallardo, a country man, saves Sofía from being attacked, a moment that marks the beginning of their love story. Franco becomes her bodyguard, and through his constant attentiveness and kindness, love blossoms between them that goes beyond mutual admiration and immediate attraction.

By Sofía's side is her daughter Barbi, a rebellious yet vulnerable young woman, driven by a search for identity and an obsession with physical perfection that will push her to her limits. Barbi will find her great love in Chava Reyes, an impeccable man with a tragic family past. Chava enters Barbi's life after becoming friends with Franco, and through a series of various encounters and misunderstandings, the love between Barbi and Chava emerges without limits. However, Rex, the adopted daughter of Franco and his wife Georgina, will find comfort in Chava and connect with him, giving rise to a complex love triangle, as there is a past between Barbi and Rex on the verge of being discovered.

At the head of Sofía's family stands Aramís Peralta-Avitia, a patriarch who carries a cold, dark secret on his shoulders. He tries to forget it, striving to be the exemplary father and grandfather who displays a supposed genuine love for his family. From that past springs a direct conflict that affects Georgina and Rex, which will cause Sofía and Franco's love to falter. To complicate matters, Sofía's ex-boyfriend, Victorio Kuri, arrives and, through scheming and intrigue, tests the strength of the love between Sofía and Franco. Adding to this is Grecia, an ambitious and dangerous young woman who infiltrates the Peralta-Avitia family to undermine it from within and thus pave the way to exact revenge against them. Sofía and Franco, along with Barbi and Chava, learn that neither betrayal nor lies can match the power of true love.

== Cast ==
=== Main ===
- Silvia Navarro as Sofía Peralta-Avitia Villaseñor / Andrómeda
- Daniel Arenas as Franco Gallardo Toro
- Paulina Goto as Bárbara "Barbi" Balmori-Ricci Peralta-Avitia
- Diego Klein as Salvador "Chava" Reyes Encino
- Sergio Sendel as Gonzalo Balmori-Ricci Nava
- Alejandro Camacho as Aramís Peralta-Avitia Cortázar
- Kimberly Dos Ramos as Grecia Diamanto
- Gabriela Platas as Catalina Peralta-Avitia Villaseñor
- Rodolfo Salas as Uriel Bolero
- Víctor González as Victorio Kuri
- Alejandra Ambrosi as Georgina "Gina" González
- Jessica Decote as Marisol Reyes Encino
- Rodrigo Murray as Mariano Reyes
- Cecilia Toussaint as Candelaria González
- Andrea Noli as Inés Encino
- Tiago Correa as Dr. Julián Arizmendi
- Natalia Madera as Cariño Pérez
- Pedro Baldo as Carlo Kuri
- Roberta Damián as Remedios "Rex" Gallardo González
- Valeria Santaella as Mónica "Monik" Lara
- Nacho Ortiz as Limón Ramos
- Mía Fabri as Mía Reyes
- Luis "Guana" Rodríguez as Rulo Calderón
- Paloma Woolrich as Emma Morales
- Roberto Tello as Bulldog
- Pablo Rosado as Solovino

=== Recurring and guest stars ===
- Moisés Zurman as Rashid Navarro
- Vanessa López as Selena Arias
- Arturo Guizar as Judge Guizar
- Fabricio Mercado as Valentino Martín
- Luis Gerardo León as Rebollar
- Beng Zeng as Wang Jr.
- Cani Sáenz as Dr. Cuéllar
- Ellian Voss as Dr. Díaz

== Production ==
On 18 October 2025, it was reported that Juan Osorio would produce an adaptation of the 2005 Argentine telenovela Amor en custodia. It is the third Mexican adaptation of the telenovela, following the 2005 version of the same name produced by TV Azteca and the 2012 adaptation Amores verdaderos by TelevisaUnivision. A week later, Silvia Navarro, Daniel Arenas, Paulina Goto and Diego Klein were announced in the lead roles. On 3 November 2025, Guardián de mi corazón was announced as the title of the telenovela. On 24 November 2025, Kimberly Dos Ramos was announced as the antagonist of the telenovela. Filming took place from on 8 December 2025 to 26 May 2026. On 8 February 2026, Osorio announced that the title of the telenovela had been changed to Guardián de mi vida.

== Ratings ==
=== Mexico ratings ===
Viewership and ratings per season of Guardián de mi vida
Season	Timeslot (CT)	Episodes	First aired		Last aired		Avg. viewers (millions)
Season	Timeslot (CT)	Episodes	Date	Viewers (millions)	Date	Viewers (millions)	Avg. viewers (millions)
1	Mon–Fri 9:30 p.m.	70	29 June 2026	3.53	2 October 2026	3.89	3.93

== Episodes ==
No.	Title	Original release date
1	"Encuentro predestinado"	18 May 2026
2	"Nuevo guardaespaldas"	19 May 2026
3	"Plan expuesto"	20 May 2026
4	"Sin hogar"	21 May 2026
5	"Engaños"	22 May 2026
6	"¿Amor no correspondido?"	25 May 2026
7	"Prueba de lealtad"	26 May 2026
8	"Conflictos de amor"	27 May 2026
9	"Amenaza creciente"	28 May 2026
10	"Fuerte unión"	29 May 2026
11	"Negación"	1 June 2026
12	"Fuertes celos"	2 June 2026
13	"El secuestro"	3 June 2026
14	"Sospechas"	5 June 2026
15	"En busqueda de la verdad"	8 June 2026
16	"Amor imposible"	9 June 2026
17	"Fiesta de despecho"	10 June 2026
18	"Infidelidad confirmada"	11 June 2026
19	"Buscando la separación"	12 June 2026
20	"Fiesta de cumpleaños"	15 June 2026
21	"Un nuevo camino"	16 June 2026
22	"Orígenes"	17 June 2026
23	"Divorcio unilateral"	18 June 2026
24	"Amor en secreto"	19 June 2026
25	"Expuestos"	22 June 2026
26	"Difíciles decisiones"	23 June 2026
27	"Manipulación"	24 June 2026
28	"Ultimátum"	25 June 2026
29	"Verdad al descubierto"	26 June 2026
30	"Alianzas"	29 June 2026
31	"Todo por amor"	30 June 2026
32	"Una gran boda"	1 July 2026
33	"Entre confesiones y venganza"	2 July 2026
34	"Descubriendo el misterio"	3 July 2026
35	"Todo queda en familia"	6 July 2026
36	"La herencia"	7 July 2026
37	"Plan de venganza"	8 July 2026
38	"Amenazas"	9 July 2026
39	"Cena de negocios"	10 July 2026
40	"Confesión de amor"	13 July 2026
41	"Plan de primas"	14 July 2026
42	"Verdades"	15 July 2026
43	"Amor y celos"	16 July 2026
44	"Amor de familia"	17 July 2026
45	"Infidelidad"	20 July 2026
46	"Estilos de vida"	21 July 2026
47	"Plan de venganza"	22 July 2026
48	"Chantajes"	23 July 2026
49	"Trampas"	24 July 2026
50	"Prisión y muerte"	27 July 2026
51	"Decisiones difíciles"	28 July 2026
52	"Enfrentando la realidad"	29 July 2026
53	"El peso del secreto"	30 July 2026
54	"Corazón abierto"	31 July 2026
55	"Hija verdadera"	3 August 2026
56	"Cruzando la línea"	4 August 2026
57	"Expuestos"	5 August 2026
58	"Plan perfecto"	6 August 2026
59	"Doble vida"	7 August 2026
60	"En tu lugar"	10 August 2026
61	"Una cruda verdad"	11 August 2026
62	"Reclamos"	12 August 2026
63	"Dudas y verdades"	13 August 2026
64	"Señales"	14 August 2026
65	"Pruebas"	17 August 2026
66	"Desenmascarados"	18 August 2026
67	"El encuentro"	19 August 2026
68	"Venganza y apoyo"	20 August 2026
69	"Mortal encuentro"	21 August 2026
70	"El futuro"	24 August 2026
71	"Planes"	25 August 2026
72	"Una gran boda"	26 August 2026
73	"Personajes de un cuento"	27 August 2026
74	"Boda y venganza"	28 August 2026
75	"Ilusiones y realidades"	31 August 2026
76	"Alegrías y venganzas"	1 September 2026
77	"Una paz merecida"	2 September 2026

== Release ==
Guardián de mi vida premiered first in the United States on Univision on 18 May 2026. In Mexico, the series aired on Las Estrellas from 29 June 2026 to 2 October 2026, with a total of 70 episodes.
