= Diego Klein =

Mexican actor

- Born: Diego Franco Klein; 8 September 1988 (age 37); Mexico City, Mexico
- Occupation: Actor
- Years active: 2016–present

Diego Franco Klein (born 8 September 1988) is a Mexican actor.

== Biography ==
Klein was born in Mexico City in 1988 into a family with artistic inclinations; his mother is a painter, his father a writer, and his sister a photographer. He studied philosophy, but his desire to become an actor prompted him to move to Spain to pursue his education. He studied at the Cristina Rota Theater School in Madrid between 2013 and 2016. During his stay in Spain, he participated in various television productions, making his debut in the series Centro médico (2016) and continuing with appearances in Velvet Colección (2017) and Reinas (2017).

In 2019, Klein returned to Mexico to continue his acting career, appearing in the television series Preso No. 1 (2019) and Los ricos también lloran (2022), as well as in the films Coda 77 (2021) and ¡Qué despadre! (2022). He starred alongside Macarena García in the telenovela Mi secreto (2022), playing the role of Mateo Miranda. He has subsequently appeared in television series and telenovelas such as Playa Soledad (2023), Vuelve a mí (2023), and guest starring in La historia de Juana (2024). He has also appeared in films such as El elixir del amor (2024), Las Tías (2024), and Loco por ella (2025). In 2025, he starred alongside Angélica Rivera and Iván Sánchez in the series Con esa misma mirada. In November 2025, Klein was cast in the lead role of the telenovela Guardián de mi vida.

== Filmography ==
=== Film ===
Year	Title	Role	Notes
2021	Coda 77	Matías	
2022	¡Qué despadre!	Serious investor	
2024	El elixir del amor	Diego	
2024	Las Tías	Ernesto	
2025	Loco por ella	Álvaro	

=== Television ===
Year	Title	Role	Notes
2016	Centro médico	Gorka	1 episode
2017	Reinas	Asid	Episode: "La decapitación"
2017	Velvet Colección	Cura	Episode: "El último adiós"
2019	Preso No. 1	Evodio Alvarado "El Tuerto"	Recurring role
2020–21	Servir y proteger	Ángel Moreno Hernández	Main cast (season 5)
2022	Los ricos también lloran	Santiago Hinojosa	Main cast
2022–23	Mi secreto	Mateo Miranda	Lead role
2023	Mala fortuna	Federico Urquiza	
2023	Playa Soledad	Rafael Parbus	
2023	Vuelve a mí	Jacinto Bermúdez	Main cast
2024	Mujeres asesinas	Milton	Episode: "Virginia"
2024	La historia de Juana	Francisco de Armas	Guest star
2025	Con esa misma mirada	Pablo Casas	Main role
2025	¿Quién es la máscara?	Capi Bara	Season 7 contestant
2026	Guardián de mi vida	Salvador "Chava" Reyes Encino	Main role
2026	Colisión	Matías	
