= Con esa misma mirada =

- Genre: Drama
- Based on: Señora Isabel by Bernardo Romero Pereiro
- Developed by: Jimena Romero; Gilma Peña; María J. Acero
- Written by: Jimena Romero; Gilma Peña; Camila Ibarra
- Directed by: Pitipol Ybarra; Alba Gil
- Starring: Angélica Rivera; Diego Klein; Iván Sánchez; Ximena Herrera; Iliana Fox; Blanca Guerra
- Composers: Violeta Torres; Pedro Mata
- Country of origin: Mexico
- Original language: Spanish
- No. of seasons: 3
- No. of episodes: 24

Production
- Executive producers: Patricia Benítez Laucin; Fides Velasco Ibarra
- Producers: Verónica Velasco; Epigmenio Ibarra
- Editor: Fernanda Morales de la Cerda
- Camera setup: Multi-camera
- Production companies: TelevisaUnivision; Argos Televisión

Original release
- Network: Vix
- Release: 21 March – 17 October 2025

Con esa misma mirada is a Mexican television series produced by Argos Televisión for TelevisaUnivision. It is based on the 1993 Colombian telenovela Señora Isabel, created by Bernardo Romero Pereiro. It stars Angélica Rivera, Diego Klein and Iván Sánchez. The series premiered on Vix on 21 March 2025. The second season was released on 27 June 2025. The third and final season premiered on 17 October 2025.

== Cast ==
=== Main ===
- Angélica Rivera as Eloísa Obregón de Hidalgo
- Diego Klein as Pablo Casas
- Iván Sánchez as Octavio Hidalgo
- Ximena Herrera as Renata
- Iliana Fox as Leticia
- Blanca Guerra as Carmela

=== Recurring and guest stars ===
- Pamela Almanza as Gabriela
- Sofía Castro as Antonia Hidalgo Obregón
- Ivanna Castro as Matilde Hidalgo Obregón
- Nicolás Haza as Samuel Hidalgo Obregón
- Fernanda Borches as Karen
- Adriana Llabrés as Julieta
- Pablo Bracho as Villalobos
- Gonzalo Vega as Tomás
- Lupita Ortiz as Nayelli
- Mateo Ortega Casillas as Daniel
- Ricardo Esquerra as Ismael
- Lucas Mollard as Rocha
- Juan Ríos Cantú as Bernardo
- Adriana Romero
- Adolfo de la Fuente as Nicolás
- Fernanda Hernández
- Andrea Aldana

== Production ==
In April 2024, it was reported that Angélica Rivera had been cast in a remake of the Colombian telenovela Señora Isabel. Filming of the series began in July 2024.

== Episodes ==
Season	Episodes	Originally released
1	8	21 March 2025
2	8	27 June 2025
3	8	17 October 2025

=== Season 1 (2025) ===
No. overall	No. in season	Title	Original release date
1	1	"Entre lienzos y engaños"	21 March 2025
2	2	"Mirada de duda"	21 March 2025
3	3	"Sombras de desconfianza"	21 March 2025
4	4	"El despertar de Eloisa"	21 March 2025
5	5	"Tras la sombra de Gabriela"	21 March 2025
6	6	"La despedida"	21 March 2025
7	7	"Caída libre"	21 March 2025
8	8	"Frente al espejo"	21 March 2025

=== Season 2 (2025) ===
No. overall	No. in season	Title	Original release date
9	1	"La verdad"	27 June 2025
10	2	"Temictli"	27 June 2025
11	3	"Información pública"	27 June 2025
12	4	"¿Quién es Eloísa Obregón?"	27 June 2025
13	5	"Limbo"	27 June 2025
14	6	"Con esa misma mirada"	27 June 2025
15	7	"¿Cuánto futuro?"	27 June 2025
16	8	"Callar los miedos"	27 June 2025

=== Season 3 (2025) ===
No. overall	No. in season	Title	Original release date
17	1	"Regresar el tiempo"	17 October 2025
18	2	"La duda"	17 October 2025
19	3	"Volver a estar juntos"	17 October 2025
20	4	"Un gran hombre"	17 October 2025
21	5	"En la orilla"	17 October 2025
22	6	"Correr el riesgo"	17 October 2025
23	7	"De corazón a corazón"	17 October 2025
24	8	"Un sueño"	17 October 2025

== Release ==
The first teaser of the series was released on 26 November 2024. The series premiered on 21 March 2025. The second season premiered on 27 June 2025. The third and final season premiered on 17 October 2025.

== Awards and nominations ==
Year	Award	Category	Nominated	Result	Ref
2025	Produ Awards	Best Romantic Drama Series	Con esa misma mirada	Won	
2025	Produ Awards	Best Lead Actress - Romantic Drama Series	Angélica Rivera	Nominated	
2025	Produ Awards	Best Lead Actor - Romantic Drama Series	Diego Klein	Nominated	
2025	Produ Awards	Best Casting	Édgar Castillo	Nominated	
