= Colisión =

- Genre: Telenovela
- Based on: No le hagas caso a tu hija and Cumplí tu condena by Corín Tellado
- Written by: Lina Arboleda; Andrés Montoya; Laura Barneix; Jorge Maestro
- Directed by: Max Zunino; Mariano Ardanaz; Laura Marco
- Starring: Macarena Achaga; Margarita Rosa de Francisco; Diego Klein; Christian Vázquez; Juan Pablo Castañedo; Jorge Caballero; Belén Aguilar; Armando Espitia
- Composer: Juan Carlos Enríquez
- Country of origin: Mexico
- Original language: Spanish
- No. of seasons: 1
- No. of episodes: 39

Production
- Executive producers: Mariano Cesar; Mónica Albuquerque; Anouk Aarón; Mariana Iskandarani; Karina Blanco Solís; Juan Ponce; Elizabeth Suarez; Valeria Fiñana; Pablo Culell
- Cinematography: Jerónimo Rodríguez García; Juan Pablo Ojeda; Alejandro Téllez Moreno
- Editor: Diego Croci
- Camera setup: Multi-camera
- Production company: Telemundo Studios

Original release
- Network: HBO Max
- Release: 7 September 2026 – present

Colisión is a Mexican telenovela based on the novels No le hagas caso a tu hija and Cumplí tu condena by Corín Tellado. It stars Macarena Achaga and Margarita Rosa de Francisco. The series premiered on HBO Max on 7 September 2026.

== Cast ==
=== Main ===
- Macarena Achaga as Zoé Robles
  - Isabella Oseguera as 15-year-old Zoé
- Margarita Rosa de Francisco as Belén de Robles
- Diego Klein as Matías
- Christian Vázquez as Ikal
- Juan Pablo Castañeda as Juan
- Jorge Caballero as Delfino
- Belén Aguilar as Mariana Valdés
- Armando Espitia as Camacho

=== Recurring and guest stars ===
- Leonardo Daniel as Miguel Ángel Robles
- Mayra Sérbulo as Sugey
- Constantino Morán as Genaro
- Ernesto Álvarez as Joaquín
- Patricia Collazo as Altagracia
- Jorge Cáceres as Gabriel
- Ximena Palacios as Paloma
- Samantha Acuña as Aitana
- Mónica Berajano as Maricarmen
- Mar Carrera as Iveth
- Matías López as Isaac
- Ricardo Nuncio as Pepe
- Yigaell Yadin as Cristiano
- Carlos Álvarez as Margarito
- David Montalvo as Andy
- Valentina Gallardo as Laura
- Azallia Ortíz as Albertina
- Arantza Ruiz as Bárbara
- Alberto Pavón as Marc
- Mauricio Bonet as Daniel
- César Ramos as Benjamín
- Axel Alcántara as Lince
- Miguel Mena as Luis Jorge
- Naiara Yune as Ashley
- Fernando Mitre as Frank
- Valeria Rosalva Ayón Barbosa as Diana
- Rous Esparza as Mara
- Carolina Cox as Abril Mendieta
- Melisa Ayala as Consuelo

== Episodes ==
No.	Title	Original release date
1	"Business Protocol" (Spanish: Protocolo empresarial)	7 September 2026
2	"New Alliances" (Spanish: Nuevas alianzas)	7 September 2026
3	"Profile of an Ex-Convict" (Spanish: Perfil de un exconvicto)	7 September 2026
4	"Panic Attack" (Spanish: Ataque de pánico)	7 September 2026
5	"Everything Has a Price" (Spanish: Se resuelve con dinero)	14 September 2026
6	"The Job Offer" (Spanish: La oferta de trabajo)	14 September 2026
7	"Attack on the González Family" (Spanish: Atentado contra los González)	14 September 2026
8	"Stay Away From Me" (Spanish: Te quiero lejos de mí)	14 September 2026
9	"Prime Suspect" (Spanish: Principal sospechoso)	14 September 2026
10	"Zoé's Destiny" (Spanish: El rumbo de Zoé)	21 September 2026
11	"Spiritual Retreat" (Spanish: Retiro espiritual)	21 September 2026
12	"The Walls Have Ears" (Spanish: Las paredes escuchan)	21 September 2026
13	"The Truth Will Set Us Free" (Spanish: La verdad nos hará libres)	21 September 2026
14	"Into the Flames" (Spanish: Entre las llamas)	21 September 2026
15	"Guilty or Innocent" (Spanish: Culpable o inocente)	28 September 2026
16	"Public Scandal" (Spanish: Escándalo público)	28 September 2026
17	"Trending Topic"	28 September 2026
18	"A Deal Between Lawyers" (Spanish: Negociación entre abogados)	28 September 2026
19	"Day of the Dead" (Spanish: Día de Muertos)	28 September 2026
20	"Belén's Reputation" (Spanish: La reputación de Belén)	5 October 2026
21	"The Hunt for Judas" (Spanish: En búsqueda del Judas)	5 October 2026
22	"Strike in Sonora" (Spanish: Huelga en Sonora)	5 October 2026
23	"Between Life and Death" (Spanish: Entre la vida y la muerte)	5 October 2026
24	"Exposure and Censorship" (Spanish: La divulgación y la censura)	5 October 2026
25	"Keeping My Distance" (Spanish: Marcando distancia)	12 October 2026
26	"Facing Addiction" (Spanish: Enfrentar la adicción)	12 October 2026
27	"A New Beginning" (Spanish: Un nuevo comienzo)	12 October 2026
28	"The Lithium Scam" (Spanish: La estafa del litio)	12 October 2026
29	"The Kidnapping" (Spanish: El secuestro)	12 October 2026
30	"Death" (Spanish: La muerte)	19 October 2026
31	"The Search for the Truth" (Spanish: La búsqueda de la verdad)	19 October 2026
32	"Hard Evidence" (Spanish: Pruebas contundentes)	19 October 2026
33	"The Truce" (Spanish: La tregua)	19 October 2026
34	"The Alliance Game" (Spanish: El juego de la alianza)	19 October 2026
35	"Political Favor" (Spanish: Favor político)	26 October 2026
36	"The Investigation" (Spanish: Proceso administrativo)	26 October 2026
37	"Code Red" (Spanish: Código rojo)	26 October 2026
38	"The Bible" (Spanish: La biblia)	26 October 2026
39	"The Confession" (Spanish: La confesión)	26 October 2026

== Production ==
The series was announced by HBO Max in February 2024 and adapts two novels by Spanish author Corín Tellado. It is produced by Telemundo Studios, who acquired the exclusive rights to Tellado's works in May 2021. Filming began in March 2024 and lasted fourteen weeks.

== Release ==
The series premiered on HBO Max on 7 September 2026. The first week featured four episodes, followed by five episodes weekly, up until the finale on 26 October.
