= Livia Brito =

Cuban actress and model (born 1986)

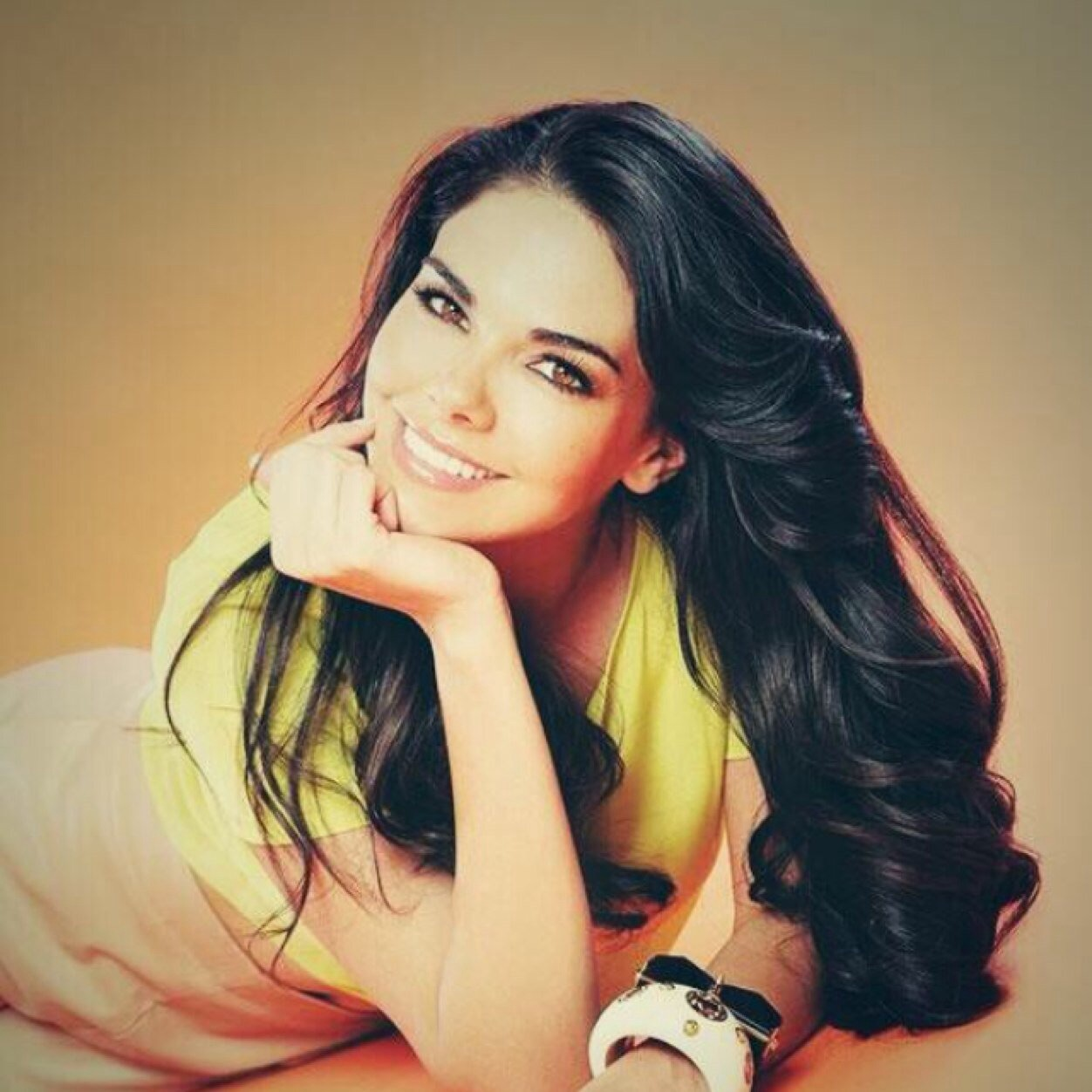
- Brito in 2014
- Born: Livia Brito Pestana; 21 July 1986 (age 40); Ciego de Ávila, Ciego de Ávila Province, Cuba
- Occupations: Actress; model
- Years active: 2010–present

Livia Brito Pestana (born 21 July 1986) is a Cuban actress and model. She made her acting debut in 2010 in the Mexican telenovela Triunfo del amor and has since been recognized for her performances in telenovelas.

== Early life ==
Brito was born on 21 July 1986 in Ciego de Ávila Province, Cuba. She is the daughter of actor Rolando Brito Rodríguez and Gertrudis Pestana. Her family immigrated to Mexico in 2000, when she was between 13 and 14 years old. A year after settling in Mexico City, her father opened a restaurant called La Cubana, which offered traditional Cuban dishes. Brito worked as a waitress at the family restaurant, and later as a model, to help pay for her studies in business administration.

Brito represented Mexico in the 2009 edition of the Reina Mundial del Banano, finishing as first runner-up and was awarded Miss Photogenic. She later enrolled in Televisa's Centro de Educación Artística (CEA). Brito comes from an artistic family, as her father was an actor in Cuba, and her mother was a ballet dancer.

== Career ==
In 2010, Brito gained popularity after making her acting debut as Fernanda Sandoval in the telenovela Triunfo del amor, produced by Salvador Mejía, and starring William Levy, Maite Perroni and Victoria Ruffo. In 2012, she portrayed the role of Paloma González in the telenovela Abismo de pasión, produced by Angelli Nesma Medina, and starring Angelique Boyer, David Zepeda and Mark Tacher.

Brito's first lead role was in Lucero Suárez's De que te quiero, te quiero (2013) with Juan Diego Covarrubias. In her second lead role, Brito was paired with José Ron in Muchacha italiana viene a casarse (2014), produced by Pedro Damián, and also filmed in Italy. In 2016, Brito portrayed as Maribel Guardia in the biographical miniseries Por siempre Joan Sebastian, produced by Carla Estrada, and starring José Manuel Figueroa. She later starred as Yolanda Cadena, the lead character in the action drama series La Piloto (2017–2018), created by W Studios, produced by Lemon Films Studios, and co-starring Arap Bethke and Juan Colucho.

In 2021, Brito had her breakthrough role as Fernanda Linares in the revenge drama La desalmada, produced by Jose Alberto Castro, and featuring an ensemble cast that included José Ron, Eduardo Santamarina, Marlene Favela, Marjorie de Sousa, Kimberly Dos Ramos, Gonzalo García Vivanco, Laura Carmine, and Daniel Elbittar.

She has since maintained starring roles in the telenovelas Mujer de nadie (2022) and Minas de pasión (2023).

== Filmography ==
Film roles
Year	Title	Role	Notes
2013	No sé si cortarme las venas o dejármelas largas	Teibolera	
2014	Volando bajo	Ana Bertha	
2014	La dictadura perfecta	Jazmín	
2017	Juan Apóstol, el más amado	Mary, mother of Jesus	
2023	Infelices para siempre	Carmen Pelusi	

Television roles
Year	Title	Role	Notes
2010–2011	Triunfo del amor	Fernanda Sandoval	
2012	Abismo de pasión	Paloma González	
2013–2014	De que te quiero, te quiero	Natalia García	
2014–2015	Muchacha italiana viene a casarse	Fiorella Bianchi	
2016	Por siempre Joan Sebastian	Maricruz Guardia	
2017	La doble vida de Estela Carrillo	Yolanda Cadena	Guest star
2017–2018	La Piloto	Yolanda Cadena	
2018	Descontrol	Eugenia	
2019–2020	Médicos, línea de vida	Regina Villaseñor	
2021	La desalmada	Fernanda Linares	
2022	Mujer de nadie	Lucía Arizmendi	
2023–2024	Minas de pasión	Emilia Sánchez	
2025	Amanecer	Alba Palacios	
2026	El precio de la fama	Amanda Escalante	Guest star
2026	Infinito amor	Cristina Vidal	

Theatre
Year	Title	Role	Venue
2012–2013	El cartero	Beatriz González	Several locations
2015–2016	Los Bonobos	Ángeles	Several locations

== Awards and nominations ==
Year	Award	Result	Category	Work
2012	ACPT Awards	Won	Female Revelation	El cartero
2012	TVyNovelas Awards (Mexico)	Won	Best Young Lead Actress	Triunfo del amor
2013	TVyNovelas Awards (Mexico)	Won	Best Young Lead Actress	Abismo de pasión
2013	TVyNovelas Awards (Mexico)	Won	The Most Beautiful Woman	Abismo de pasión
2014	TVyNovelas Awards (Mexico)	Nominated	The Most Beautiful Woman	De que te quiero, te quiero
2014	TVyNovelas Awards (Mexico)	Won	Favorite Kiss (with Juan Diego Covarrubias)	De que te quiero, te quiero
2016	ACE Awards	Won	Best Actress	Muchacha italiana viene a casarse
2016	Premios Juventud	Nominated	My Favorite Protagonist	Muchacha italiana viene a casarse
2016	TVyNovelas Awards (Mexico)	Nominated	Best Actress	Muchacha italiana viene a casarse
2019	TVyNovelas Awards (Mexico)	Nominated	Best Actress	La Piloto
2020	TVyNovelas Awards (Mexico)	Nominated	Favorite Couple (with Daniel Arenas)	Médicos, línea de vida
2020	TVyNovelas Awards (Mexico)	Nominated	The Most Beautiful Woman	Médicos, línea de vida
2020	TVyNovelas Awards (Mexico)	Won	The Most Beautiful Smile	Médicos, línea de vida
2022	Premios Juventud	Nominated	They Make Me Fall In Love (with José Ron)	La desalmada
2024	Premios Juventud	Nominated	My Favorite Actress	Minas de pasión
2024	Premios Juventud	Nominated	They Make Me Fall In Love (with Osvaldo de León)	Minas de pasión
2025	Premios Juventud	Nominated	My Favorite Actress	Amanecer
