= Minas de pasión =

- Genre: Telenovela
- Based on: La Patrona by Valentina Párraga
- Written by: Bethel Flores; Edwin Valencia; María Elena López; Romy Díaz
- Directed by: Jorge Robles Sánchez; Manolo Fernández; Juan Carlos Muñoz
- Starring: Livia Brito; Osvaldo de León; Anette Michel; Alejandro Camacho
- Theme music composer: Christian Nodal
- Opening theme: "Qué tal" by Christian Nodal
- Composer: Silvana Medrano
- Country of origin: Mexico
- Original language: Spanish
- No. of seasons: 1
- No. of episodes: 107

Production
- Executive producer: Pedro Ortiz de Pinedo
- Producer: Liliana Cuesta Aguirre
- Editors: Rodrigo Lepe; Irving Rosas
- Production company: TelevisaUnivision

Original release
- Network: Las Estrellas
- Release: 21 August 2023 – 14 January 2024

Minas de pasión (English: Mines of Passion) is a Mexican telenovela produced by Pedro Ortiz de Pinedo for TelevisaUnivision. The series is based on the 2013 American telenovela La Patrona, itself an adaptation of the 1984 Venezuelan telenovela La dueña. It aired on Las Estrellas from 21 August 2023 to 14 January 2024. The series stars Livia Brito, Osvaldo de León, Anette Michel and Alejandro Camacho.

== Plot ==
Emilia Sánchez is a single mother who works in a mine, where she meets Leonardo Santamaría, son of Roberta Castro, the most powerful woman in town. Emilia and Leonardo fall in love, unleashing Roberta's rage, who, upon learning that Emilia has discovered her mismanagement of the mine's administration, will seek revenge by making her life miserable.

== Cast ==
- Livia Brito as Emilia Sánchez / Victoria Alcázar
- Osvaldo de León as Leonardo Santamaría
- Anette Michel as Roberta Castro de Villamizar
- Alejandro Camacho as Julián Sánchez "El Tigre"
- Cynthia Klitbo as Zaira Pérez
- Karyme Lozano as Aleida Cervantes
- Sylvia Sáenz as Sara Quintana
- Rodrigo Murray as Adalberto Quintana
- Carlos Gatica as Sebastián Martínez
- Rodrigo Brand as Danilo Betancourt
- Omar Germenos as Fidel Roldán de la Fuente
- Mayra Rojas as Joaquina Castro
- Alma Cero as Gigi Quintana
- Lizy Martínez as Jennifer Quintana
- Moises Peñaloza as Orlando Roldán
- Adolfo de la Fuente as Mauricio Santamaría
- Michelle Orozco as Miriam "Mimi" García
- Melissa Lee as Fatima
- Arturo Posada as Ezequiel
- Raúl Orvañanos as Patricio Lazcano
- Priscila Solorio as Flor
- Iker García as Nicolás Sánchez Guzmán
  - Andrés Ruanova as 6-year-old Nicolás
- Edward Castillo as Gael Sánchez Pérez
  - Lukas Urkijo as teen Gael
- Valeria Burgos as María José "Marijo" Villamizar
  - Arianna Valh as teen Marijo
- César Évora as Ignacio Villamizar
- Pedro Sicard as Marat

== Production ==
=== Development ===
In March 2023, it was reported that TelevisaUnivision would be producing a remake of the 2013 American telenovela La Patrona, with Pedro Ortiz de Pinedo as executive producer. On 11 May 2023, de Pinedo announced that Minas de pasión would be the series official title. On 16 May 2023, the series was announced at TelevisaUnivision's upfront for the 2023–2024 television season. Filming of the series began on 25 May 2023.

=== Casting ===
On 24 March 2023, Osvaldo de León was announced in the lead role. On 14 April 2023, Alejandro Camacho joined the cast in the role of El Tigre. On 12 May 2023, Livia Brito was announced to star opposite of de León, and an extensive cast and characters list was published. Ariadne Díaz was initially considered for the lead role, however, she rejected the role for personal reasons.

== Episodes ==
No.	Title	Original release date	Mexico viewers (millions)
Part 1
1	"¡Váyase al demonio!"	21 August 2023 (Note: Premiered early online through Las Estrellas website on 18 August 2023)	2.4
Ignacio travels to the city to give Leonardo the news that he has been diagnosed with Alzheimer's disease. Emilia looks for Roberta in her office and discovers that she is unfaithful to her husband. Despite warnings, Emilia decides to enter the mine to prevent the accident from claiming the lives of her co-workers. Emilia finds Nicolás in Leonardo's arms and believing that the stranger is trying to harm him, she rushes to his rescue.
2	"La cueva del diablo"	22 August 2023	2.3
Roberta was the one who had Nico kidnapped and assures her men that she will do everything to get Emilia out of her way. Mauricio looks for Emilia to tell her that he loves her and to give him a chance. Roberta reads a message stating that Emilia, by order of Ignacio, is the new owner of one of his lands. Emilia reveals to Ignacio that Roberta and Fidel are lovers, but he gets ill.
3	"Yo nunca te haría daño"	23 August 2023	2.4
Jennifer reveals to Roberta that Mauricio is in love with Emilia, so Roberta gives her an idea to woo him. Ignacio confesses to Emilia that he knew about Roberta's infidelity and asks for her help to unmask her. Emilia and Nico are stranded and Leonardo arrives to help them, but is mistreated by Emilia. Roberta changes Ignacio's Bach flowers with a substance to poison him.
4	"Juntos para toda la eternidad"	24 August 2023	2.2
Emilia uses Sebastián to silence Sara, who keeps attacking her. Nico questions Emilia about his father and tells her that if he had one, he would like him to be like Leonardo. Leonardo and Emilia try to flee when they see the mine collapsing, but they are trapped. Seeing that they will not be rescued, Leonardo and Emilia join hands and lose consciousness in the mine.
5	"Siempre voy a estar ligado a ti"	25 August 2023	2.3
Emilia and Leonardo are rescued from the mine. Ignacio asks Leonardo to watch over Emilia, Nicolás and El Tigre because they are like his family. Leonardo tells Emilia that, from now on, he will always be linked to her. Ignacio confronts Roberta for all the evil she has done, but she kills him.
6	"Vamos a hacer justicia"	28 August 2023	2.6
Sara complains to Emilia for returning to work in the mine but Leonardo defends her. Leonardo is shocked to learn that his father died. Roberta threatens Joaquina with blaming her for Ignacio's death. Leonardo believes that his father died because of the embezzlements at the mine, but Emilia tells him that there is another betrayal that killed him. Leonardo tells Roberta that he will do everything to fulfill his father's will, but she puts a stop to it.
7	"Heredo mis bienes en partes iguales"	29 August 2023	2.1
El Tigre surprises everyone at Ignacio's wake with a mariachi band, which bothers Roberta. Sebastián questions Emilia about her feelings for Leonardo, but she denies having anything to do with him. At the reading of the will, Ignacio informs the family on video that María José and Leonardo are his heirs. Sebastián demands Leonardo to stay away from Emilia and they come to blows.
8	"Estamos enlazados para siempre"	30 August 2023	1.9
Jennifer does not accept Mauricio's proposal because she is fed up with his disdain. Leonardo ends the fight with Sebastián. Sara demands Leonardo to fire Emilia, but as he refuses, she tells him to forget about their relationship. Emilia makes fun of the clothes Leonardo wears to enter the mine, so he takes off his shirt. Leonardo saves Emilia from a cave-in in the mine; she thanks him and he kisses her.
9	"Cásate conmigo"	31 August 2023	2.3
Emilia puts a stop to Leonardo for kissing her. Sara bumps into Emilia and they insult each other. Sebastián surprises Emilia with mariachi and gives her an engagement ring. Nico is upset that Emilia rejected Sebastián and demands to know where his father is. Roberta offers Emilia an apology for putting Tigre in prison, but Emilia doubts her sincerity.
10	"Jugar al gato y al ratón"	1 September 2023	1.8
Emilia reveals to Leonardo how she feels about him, but asks him to stay away. Although Roberta knows that María José is at El Tigre's house, she talks to the police to report her disappearance in order to get rid of Emilia. Emilia is worried about María José's disappearance, but questions Zaira and El Tigre when she finds her living in their house. María Jose opens her heart to Emilia by confessing all the bad things Roberta does to her; Emilia promises to take care of her.
11	"Nos tiene en la mira"	4 September 2023	2.1
Emilia tells Leonardo that she knows María José's location. Zaira uses her herbs to scare the evil out of her house and prevent Roberta from harming her family. Ezequiel and his men enter El Tigre's house to forcibly search for María José, but things get out of control. Orlando asks Fidel for help to stop Roberta's evil, but his father blackmails him. Gael asks María José to be his girlfriend; she accepts and they kiss.
12	"No puedo dejar de pensar en ti"	5 September 2023	2.3
Mauricio keeps attacking Leonardo for being named Ignacio's heir. Emilia takes Nico to the doctor because of his stomach pain and the doctor shows her what is really wrong with him. Leonardo accepts to Emilia how much he loves her and as she admits to feeling the same, they kiss. Roberta gives María José a tranquilizer.
13	"Quiero cambiar el testamento"	6 September 2023	2.2
Leonardo asks Roberta to be considerate of María José's pain, but Roberta takes the opportunity to torment him. Emilia tells Tigre that she will not allow the family to go down because of Roberta and that, if necessary, they will fight back. María José asks Leonardo to modify Ignacio's will so that Roberta will be her executor. The miners tease Emilia and flirt with her, but she puts a stop to it.
14	"¿Quieres ser mi novia?"	7 September 2023	2.0
Gigi arrives at Adalberto's office to see him, but finds him in the middle of a kiss with his mistress. Sara tries to smooth things over with Emilia and suggests that she stay away from Leonardo to prevent him from breaking her heart. María José despises Gael in order to disappoint him to avoid more problems. Leonardo swears to Emilia that what he wants most is to love her as no one else has ever done.
15	"Ese hombre me destruyó la vida"	8 September 2023	2.1
Emilia decides to start a relationship with Leonardo, but asks him to keep it a secret for a while. Emilia confesses to Zaira her fear of starting a relationship with Leonardo because of what she experienced years ago. The police go to Tigre's house to arrest Gael and he surrenders to them.
16	"¡Somos novios!"	11 September 2023	2.3
Sara tries to attack Leonardo and Emilia in the middle of the party, but Leonardo admits in front of everyone that he loves Emilia. Sara assures Emilia that Leonardo will leave her for not being of the same social class. Jennifer confronts Emilia for ruining her party and insults Nico's origin; Emilia slaps her. Mauricio begs Emilia for a chance and confesses his love again just as Leonardo arrives.
17	"¡Emilia fue mía!"	12 September 2023	2.2
Leonardo decides to take Emilia home, but Mauricio gets upset and throws a punch. Leonardo tells Nico that he is already a single man, so Nico suggests that he becomes his mother's boyfriend. Roberta gets Gael out of prison, drops the lawsuit against El Tigre and asks Emilia to start from scratch. Mauricio complains to Leonardo for separating him from Emilia because they used to be boyfriend and girlfriend. In addition, he is going to take a paternity test to find out if Nico is his son.
18	"Me quiero morir"	13 September 2023	1.9
A reporter questions Emilia for all the scandals she is going through, but she and Zaira put her in her place without knowing that Sara is behind this event. Roberta finds a photo of Nico and is struck by his resemblance to Mauricio. Mauricio tells Emilia that he no longer wants to live and will make an attempt on his life. Emilia and Leonardo arrive at the place where Mauricio is trying to take his own life to stop him.
19	"Voy a estar en deuda contigo"	14 September 2023	2.2
Leonardo and Emilia act in time to prevent Mauricio from falling down the ravine and dying. Roberta, seeing that Emilia saved her son's life, asks for another chance, but Emilia refuses. Sebastián talks to Emilia about what happened with Nico and she breaks down in tears for not fulfilling as a mother. El Tigre arrives at Roberta's house to confront her for ruining his life.
20	"Justicia divina"	15 September 2023	1.6
Ramiro accuses Emilia of the abuse his family has suffered from her and all her loved ones. Sebastián asks Emilia to open her eyes because her life has changed since she started dating Leonardo. Nico leaves a note for Emilia to go to the hospital to settle things with Rigo. Sara offers her help to Leonardo to find Nico, but when she sees Emilia nearby, she kisses him to provoke her.
21	"¡Nico es mi hijo!"	18 September 2023	2.0
Mauricio receives the DNA test results and discovers that Nico is his son; Roberta finds out and celebrates the news. Nico collapses in Mauricio's arms and at the hospital questions Emilia about his condition. Mauricio visits Nico in the hospital to promise him that he will take care of him. Mauricio reveals to Emilia that Nico is his son and that he was the one who raped her.
22	"Me destrozaste la vida"	19 September 2023	2.2
Fidel advises Roberta on what she has to do to get custody of Nico and she is willing to pay any price. Jennifer confirms her suspicion that Nico is Mauricio's son and tries to call off her engagement but Roberta blackmails her to go through with it. Mauricio confesses to Roberta how he slept with Emilia and upon hearing this, Roberta blames Emilia for being a bad woman. Leonardo confronts Mauricio for making Emilia suffer and Mauricio explains that it is all because he is Nico's father.
23	"Estoy cansada de llorar"	20 September 2023	2.1
Roberta assures Leonardo that she already knew about the relationship between Emilia and Mauricio, making him suspect that she betrayed him. Emilia fears that upon discovering that Nico is Mauricio's son, Roberta will do something against her to take custody of him. El Tigre apologizes to Emilia for having thought the worst of her when he found out she was pregnant. Leonardo questions Emilia for having kept the secret about Nico's father and she confesses that Mauricio drugged her.
24	"Al infierno vas a ir a dar"	21 September 2023	2.0
Sebastián confronts Mauricio and tries to take him to the police station to declare his crime against Emilia. El Tigre rushes to Roberta's house to kill Mauricio for what he did to Emilia. Emilia arrives to stop her father and convince him to denounce Mauricio. Leonardo and Emilia take Mauricio to confess his crime but Roberta asks Fidel for help and gets him to carry out his trial in freedom.
25	"¿Te quieres casar conmigo?"	22 September 2023	2.0
Emilia confesses to Leonardo having seen Roberta and Fidel together shortly before Ignacio's death. Emilia receives an eviction order for defaulting on her father's debt, putting her own house at risk. Emilia decides to confront the lender about the lawsuit and discovers that Roberta bought the documents to leave her and Nico homeless. Leonardo buys a house to start a family with Emilia and arranges a date to propose to her.
26	"Un as bajo la manga"	25 September 2023	2.1
While cleaning, Joaquina finds the letter that Ignacio wrote to Emilia. Sara shows Leonardo the results of her investigation where it is proven that Roberta has been stealing from the mine. Emilia receives the letter from Ignacio where he points out that the mine "La cueva del diablo" is in her name, giving her all the power to take possession of it. Months after Emilia has taken possession of the mine, Roberta returns to San Lorenzo and confesses to Nicolás that his father is Mauricio.
27	"El mundo es de los fuertes"	26 September 2023	2.2
Nico complains to Emilia for having hidden the truth about his father from him and flees without allowing anyone to give him any reason for what happened. Emilia offers Roberta the property of "La cueva del diablo" in exchange for allowing her to leave San Lorenzo and never come looking for her again. Roberta and Emilia agree on the terms of their deal but Roberta confesses to Fidel that both the mine and Nicolás will end up in her hands. Mauricio discovers that the collapse at the mine was orchestrated by Roberta to lock up El Tigre and Emilia but decides to risk his life to save her.
28	"¡Mauricio está muerto!"	27 September 2023	2.3
Roberta demands Leonardo to save Mauricio and he blames her for having ordered the opening of the mine. Mauricio regrets the pain he caused Emilia and apologizes to Nico; after forgiving himself, he dies. Roberta blames everyone for Mauricio's death and wants to prevent the rescue of Tigre as revenge. Roberta blames Emilia for all the misfortunes her family has experienced and decides to kill her.
29	"¡Me quieren matar!"	28 September 2023	2.1
Roberta decides to spare Emilia's life knowing that she will pay for Mauricio's life until she decides to end her own. Emilia learns that she is pregnant and is afraid to think that Roberta might hurt one of her children. El Tigre receives the news that he will never walk again. Roberta demands her right as a grandmother to take Nico to Mauricio's funeral and blames Emilia for her loss.
30	"Denuncia por homicidio"	29 September 2023	2.0
Emilia's heart stops and she manages to see her mother and Ignacio again in the afterlife. Roberta files a complaint against Emilia accusing her of threatening Mauricio before the mine accident. The doctors convince Leonardo that Emilia authorized the termination of the pregnancy and complains to her about it. Sara takes advantage of the argument between Leonardo and Emilia to convince him that she is the right woman for him.
31	"¡Asesina!"	2 October 2023	2.2
While Emilia flees from the police, Roberta asks for help from the townspeople blaming her for all the misfortunes that have befallen the town. The townspeople prepare to make Emilia pay for her crimes by burning her but Roberta manages to stop them knowing that only her justice will be enough. With Emilia's judicial apprehension, Fidel manages to do what is necessary to give Roberta custody of Nico.
32	"Bienvenida al infierno"	3 October 2023	2.1
Roberta shows Emilia the documents that stipulate Nico's custody in her care and teases that she will not be able to do anything to reverse the judge's decision. Emilia can't control the hatred she feels for Roberta and demands that she pay for everything she has done against her. Roberta pays Emilia's lawyer to spike her drink to make sure the trial ends as she has planned. Emilia is sentenced to 40 years in prison. Roberta fears that Leonardo will find a way to reverse the outcome of the trial and orders an attack against him to stop him. Emilia wakes up bound and learns from Roberta that she will spend the rest of her life in an asylum.
33	"Muerta en vida"	4 October 2023	2.1
Roberta mocks Emilia's confinement and takes advantage of the fact that no one will listen to her by confessing all her crimes and plans for Nico. Joaquina confronts Roberta for planning the attack that almost killed Leonardo. Sara confesses to Leonardo all the terrible acts she knows about Roberta and that she had reached an agreement to get him out of San Lorenzo. Aleida advises Emilia to leave San Lorenzo and separate from Leonardo, warning her that this is the only way she can be happy.
34	"Me estoy volviendo loca"	5 October 2023	2.4
Roberta demands the doctor to continue experimenting medical treatments on Emilia regardless of ethical limits. Sebastián manages to infiltrate Emilia's room where she begs him to save her. Leonardo visits Nico to return him to his family but fearing for his mother, he chooses to stay with Roberta. The doctor follows Roberta's instructions and orders Emilia to be prepared for electric shock therapy.
35	"¡Sin mi hijo no me voy!"	6 October 2023	2.5
Emilia manages to escape from the asylum with the help of the nurse. Emilia infiltrates Roberta's house and finds Nico, who is happy to see her free. Joaquina warns Emilia that Roberta is looking for her and she decides to leave Nico in her care to stay alive. Unwilling to lose Leonardo, Sara gives Roberta a clue to find Emilia.
36	"Dame fuerzas para soportar este infierno"	9 October 2023	2.4
Leonardo accuses Roberta that she is the one to blame for Mauricio's death but she refuses to accept it and slaps him. Roberta manages to prevent Sebastián from taking Nico and demands that he and the Sanchezes stay away from San Lorenzo or they will pay the consequences. Roberta confesses to Nico that faced with the psychiatric diagnosis, she had no choice but to admit Emilia to a mental institution. Sebastián manages to hide in Emilia's room and discovers many of the secrets hidden inside the institution.
37	"Te vas a quemar en el infierno"	10 October 2023	2.6
Sebastián is forced to fight his way out of the asylum and accidentally drops the phone containing the doctor's confession. Emilia blames Roberta for killing Ignacio and knowing that no one will listen to her madness, Roberta confesses that she did the same with his dead wife. Fidel visits Aleida, his supposedly deceased wife, so that she can give him her land. On Roberta's orders, the asylum is set on fire, putting Emilia, Aleida and Danilo in danger.
38	"¡Emilia está muerta!"	11 October 2023	2.2
Leonardo runs to save Emilia's life, but as soon as he opens the door, the building explodes in front of him. The firemen manage to put out the fire and assure that there are no survivors in the rubble. Sebastián demands that Orlando take it upon himself to find the culprit of the fire and make them pay. Sebastián finds the cross he gave Emilia while she was hospitalized and realizes it is in front of her charred body.
39	"Ave Fénix"	12 October 2023	2.6
After confirming that Emilia's body has been found, Roberta gives Nico the news of his mother's death. El Tigre blames Roberta for Emilia's death and at her grave he swears that the day will come when he will get all the evidence to unmask her. Thanks to the joint effort of Danilo and Aleida, Emilia is taken to the hospital where she is treated for the burns she suffered in the fire. Months later, Emilia wakes up and decides to face the challenge of recognizing herself in the mirror.
40	"¡Estoy embarazada!"	13 October 2023	2.3
Nico asks Roberta to return to the same school he attended and assures her that now that he is part of her family, he will be able to defend himself. Sara looks for Leonardo to tell him that she is pregnant. While Tigre feels useless for not being able to get a job, Leonardo looks for his help to rebuild the mine. Emilia goes to Roberta's house ready to escape with Nico, but is hit by surprise by Leonardo's car.
41	"Confronta tu nuevo destino"	16 October 2023	2.5
Gigi takes advantage of her candidacy to take charge of clearing Emilia's name and asks Sebastián for help. Leonardo asks Sara to allow him to be part of her baby's life but she refuses so as not to give him a separated family. Nico orders Roberta to free María José to prevent her from being separated from him. Aleida and Danilo take Emilia to her own grave.
42	"Tiene que morir para renacer"	17 October 2023	2.4
Sebastián convinces Tigre to accept Roberta as a partner to keep an eye on her and one day gather evidence to expose her. Emilia returns to Nico's school and finds the courage to see her son. Leonardo is convinced to give his baby the family he needs and proposes to Sara. Emilia visits her loved ones from afar and says goodbye to leave San Lorenzo waiting for the day she will be able to return.
43	"Me voy derrotada"	18 October 2023	2.4
Nico decides to follow Roberta's recommendations and completely forget about his mother. Roberta advises Gigi to listen to all her requests if she wants to advance in the world of politics, starting with forgiving her husband. Aleida, Emilia and Danilo say goodbye to San Lorenzo under the promise to return one day to collect justice against those who harmed them. Aleida confirms that her uncle left her a valuable inheritance, but while they are looking for a way to collect it, Fidel arrives with the intention of seizing the money.
44	"Adiós Emilia Sánchez"	19 October 2023	2.4
El Tigre confronts Leonardo for having betrayed Emilia's trust long before her death and despises him for allying with Roberta. Aleida decides to follow what her uncle told her and finds the treasure hidden in the same place portrayed in the painting. Leonardo complains to Roberta for manipulating Nicolás and warns her that he is willing to fight for his custody. Emilia says goodbye to everything to start a new life in search of justice.
45	"Una nueva identidad"	20 October 2023	2.4
El Tigre refuses to accept Roberta's people in the mine and warns that no matter what, only one of them will be the owner. Some men surprise Sebastian outside his house ready to give him a beating ordered by one of his enemies. Roberta interferes in Leonardo's plans and tells him that she has already planned his wedding with Sara for the next day. Emilia, Aleida and Danilo agree to undergo an operation to look unrecognizable the day they return to San Lorenzo.
46	"Los declaro marido y mujer"	23 October 2023	2.6
Roberta takes Leonardo to his wedding ceremony and forces him to marry Sara. Emilia has complications during her surgery. Nico asks Roberta to let him go with Leonardo as he prefers him to be his father. Sara worries about Roberta's reaction the day she finds out that she lied to her about the father of her baby. Emilia prepares to leave San Lorenzo under a new identity.
47	"Hoy nace Victoria Alcázar"	24 October 2023	2.8
Leonardo decides to accept Roberta's deal to make sure Nico has a normal childhood as Emilia would have wanted. Zaira takes Tigre to the church under false pretenses but in reality she prepared everything to marry him. Emilia asks Danilo and Aleida to teach her everything they know so as not to let anyone walk all over her the day she decides to return to San Lorenzo. After four years of preparation, Emilia is ready to return to San Lorenzo as Victoria Alcázar.
Part 2
48	"Al borde de la quiebra"	25 October 2023	2.6
Leonardo and Sara complain to each other for not balancing the time they spend at home or at the office, as they can no longer bear to spend time together. Roberta visits Leonardo to admit her mistake in letting him go to Mexico City and asks him to return to San Lorenzo, as the mine needs his help. El Tigre learns that Roberta's decisions are leading the mine to ruin and the first to pay the consequences are the miners. A crisis forces Roberta to seek outside help and she finds the company that Emilia established to put an end to her reign.
49	"Los muertos no demandan"	26 October 2023	2.7
El Tigre's landlord informs him that he can no longer wait for him to pay the rent and will have to evict him. Roberta warns Sara that if she does not return with Leonardo to San Lorenzo, she will be forced to reveal to him her affair with Danilo. Sebastián returns to San Lorenzo to help Tigre and manages to prevent him from ending up on the street. Roberta despairs at having no answer from Victoria and decides to call her directly.
50	"No dar tregua"	27 October 2023	2.5
Victoria proves that unlike Emilia, she will not allow anyone to walk all over her. Emilia takes advantage of the mine plans to make Roberta give in to her demands. Sara discovers Roberta kissing Fidel, confirming that their romance is still going on. After planting the explosives in the mine, Emilia discovers that a miner is still inside, unaware that it is her brother Gael.
51	"Ponerse en peligro"	30 October 2023	2.4
Sara tries to seduce Leonardo but he accidentally calls her Emilia. Roberta refuses to go back to living in poverty while remembering her childhood, which she shared with Joaquina. Faced with severe structural problems at the mine, Leonardo is forced to ask Tigre to return to the same mine from which he was fired. Emilia sees Nico and hugs him, but he doesn't recognize her.
52	"Por fin frente a frente"	31 October 2023	2.3
Roberta realizes that the problems at the mine are much bigger than she thought, forcing her to look for Victoria. Victoria goes to the meeting with Roberta, leaving a strong impression on everyone in attendance. Victoria claims that the antiquated systems imposed on the mine are the reason for its limited success, blaming Roberta and Leonardo for their bad decisions. Victoria asks Roberta and Leonardo for 5 million pesos in order to help them raise the mine and upon seeing Roberta's reaction, Victoria mocks them, assuring that they would not be able to afford her services.
53	"Es imposible no enamorarme de ti"	1 November 2023	2.3
María José returns to San Lorenzo and immediately goes out to look for Gael. Gael confronts Victoria assuring her that no matter what she says, he knows that she is really his sister, Emilia. Leonardo sees Victoria pretending that she doesn't know Gael but deep down, Leonardo is certain that she is really Emilia. Roberta offers Zaira to drop the charges against her in exchange for convincing Tigre to go back to work in the mine.
54	"Los negocios no se mezclan con el placer"	2 November 2023	2.2
Victoria is friendly with Sara to gain her trust, assuring Aleida that it is better to keep enemies close. Roberta orders Victoria to be investigated again but focusing on her personal life to uncover her biggest secrets and use them to her advantage. Sara finds out that Victoria will be working with Leonardo and decides to return to work in the mine to keep them apart. El Tigre agrees to return to work in the mine to free Zaira and from the first moment he sees Victoria, he realizes that his daughter is alive.
55	"Me recuerda a Emilia"	3 November 2023	2.4
Victoria agrees to work close to Leonardo as long as they keep their distance, because she knows that Sara is jealous of her. Victoria proves to Tigre that despite his experience, things will be done as she orders in order to mislead him of her true identity. Leonardo admits that he can't stop thinking about Victoria since he met her. Victoria asks Sebastián not to lose hope assuring him that sooner or later, Roberta will pay for all the damage she has done.
56	"Cuide a su esposo"	6 November 2023	2.4
Roberta puts María José to work as a miner to make her regret her decision to get involved in the family business. Sara invades Victoria's office and warns her that nothing and no one will separate her from her husband Leonardo. Gael complains to Roberta for putting María José to work as a miner, but María José puts a stop to him, telling him that she doesn't need anyone to fight her battles. Leonardo asks Victoria for a chance to talk alone but she rejects him, warning him that it would be easy for her to cancel her contract as a consultant.
57	"O comes o te comen"	7 November 2023	2.7
Roberta applauds Nico's efforts to prove that he is better than his peers and indicates that this is the only way to be respected. Victoria shows up at Roberta's house and Sara tries to put a limit on her. Victoria advises Roberta and Leonardo to modernize the mine and ends up convincing her by pointing out the enormous profits it could generate. El Tigre confesses to Victoria the reason why he agreed to return to the mine and she promises him that he and his people can always count on her protection.
58	"Quiero que Leonardo se enamore de mí"	8 November 2023	2.4
Emilia overhears Roberta's conversation with Fidel and confirms their complicity in getting rid of Ignacio. Leonardo threatens Roberta with leaving if she begins a partnership with Fidel in the renovation of the mine. Emilia suffers when she confirms Roberta's confession about her godfather's death and when she sees Leonardo, she takes refuge in his arms. Aleida warns Emilia about getting too close to Leonardo again but Emilia confesses that it is all part of her plan to make him and Sara pay for their betrayal.
59	"Me gustaría que fuéramos socias, Victoria"	9 November 2023	2.2
Roberta learns that the company has run out of money due to the consulting fee with Victoria and she has no more money available to invest. Roberta offers Victoria the opportunity to partner with her so she can have a mine of her own. Danilo and Aleida complain to Emilia for having rejected Roberta's proposal, as they assure her that she will never have another opportunity. Nico ignores Sara's authority and when she puts him in his place, he decides to run away from home.
60	"Victoria y Roberta se asocian"	10 November 2023	2.4
Roberta knows that she will soon succeed in convincing Victoria to partner with her and when she does, she will not hesitate to do anything to strip her of her fortune. After a rigorous negotiation, Victoria agrees to partner with Roberta despite knowing the dangers that await her. Aleida discovers that there is more than just a working relationship between Danilo and Sara. Victoria confirms to Sebastián her partnership with Roberta and he is disappointed in her when he sees that she is only following her own ambition.
61	"Emilia sigue aquí"	13 November 2023	2.6
Miriam visits Sebastián with the excuse of bringing him his food and takes the opportunity to make it clear to Victoria that she is his girlfriend and they share a child together. María José tells Gael that he is not her only option but a stranger approaches him asking for directions and he takes the opportunity to make her jealous as well. Surprised by Sara's political aspirations, Roberta threatens her not to interfere with her interests. Sebastián notices a couple of clues that point to Victoria being Emilia but he dismisses them, swearing it is impossible.
62	"Quiero ser tu amigo, Victoria"	14 November 2023	2.4
Roberta is threatened by Victoria's beauty when she sees Fidel's interest in her. Cayetana arrives at Roberta's house to ask for a job and rejects her but Marijo offers her support so that she won't be on the street. Tigre visits Jacinto to give him the rent for his house but Jacinto tells him that Victoria has already visited him to settle the outstanding debt. Sara complains to Leonardo about Victoria's interference in their marriage, as he is clearly interested in her in the same way he was interested in Emilia before.
63	"Sí, soy Emilia"	15 November 2023	2.6
Sebastián finds Victoria at Emilia's grave and becomes suspicious; unable to give him any other explanation, she is forced to confess to him that she is really Emilia and asks him to join her cause against Roberta. Leonardo demands an explanation from Sara regarding the roses she received the day before since he did not send them. Victoria gives Sara the news that she will soon be a partner in the mine and consequently, her boss; Sara complains to Leonardo and Roberta for not having kept her informed. After signing the mine partnership, Victoria imposes on Roberta her own life insurance in which it is assured that she would also lose in case of death.
64	"Victoria se provoca un accidente para culpar a Roberta"	16 November 2023	2.5
Sara implies to Adalberto that she and Leonardo are in trouble because of his interest in Victoria; he gives her advice on how to keep her husband by her side. Victoria fakes an attempt on her life to make Leonardo believe that Roberta organized it so she can collect the mine's life insurance. Sebastián disagrees with the methods Emilia uses against Roberta and warns her of the dangerous path she is taking. Nico accepts the challenge of his classmates and goes to the mine with his hands tied to face the haunted cave.
65	"Yo voy a encontrar a Nicolás"	17 November 2023	2.4
Sara warns Leonardo that she plans to divorce him and offers him a chance to patch things up but he walks out on her when he learns that Nico is in danger. Victoria finds Nico but while trying to reach him, she slips and suffers a fall. Nico remembers Emilia's advice on what to do if he gets lost in the woods but also slips and falls among the rocks. As Roberta goes deeper into the forest looking for Nico, she is attacked by a poisonous snake.
66	"Siempre te voy a cuidar Nico"	20 November 2023	2.4
Leonardo finds Roberta and takes her to the meeting point asking Zaira to help her fight the snake's venom. Victoria finds Nico and tries to carry him to the meeting point but Gigi and Sebastián find them and help immediately. Roberta wakes up and assures that if she is alive it is thanks to the care Victoria took before pinpointing her location. Sebastián recognizes what an effort it must have been for Victoria to help Roberta, but Victoria reassures that she needs Roberta alive to achieve her plans for justice.
67	"Victoria es como yo"	21 November 2023	2.6
Miriam complains to Sebastián for not checking in all night and assures him that he is in love with Victoria. Nico offers to Victoria to be her son's friend and asks for a photo of him to start getting to know him; Victoria fears that her lie will be exposed. Nico confesses to seeing his mother while he was lost in the woods but Zaira assures him that it was all a hallucination caused by the infection. Fidel confronts Leonardo, assuring him that he is in love with Roberta and asks for permission to marry her. Zaira finds Victoria hugging Gael and suspects they are in a relationship; after confronting them, Emilia reveals her identity.
68	"No me dejes, Leonardo"	22 November 2023	2.7
Sebastián finds Danilo with Sara talking about love and confronts him believing that he could betray Emilia. Cayetana questions Maria José about her feelings for Gael to find out if she can continue to pursue him. Leonardo recognizes that his marriage to Sara is in trouble and despite his wife's pleas, he decides to separate for a while. Sebastián confesses to Emilia that despite having believed her dead, he has not stopped loving her and asks her for a chance.
69	"Una noche de Victoria"	23 November 2023	2.4
Emilia once again rejects Sebastián asking him to allow himself to be happy next to Miriam and her son. Victoria steals Leonardo's attention leaving Sara alone in front of all the high society of San Lorenzo. Upon returning from their date, Cayetana steals a kiss from Gael and asks him to be her boyfriend. Sara confesses to Victoria that her marriage is in trouble and asks her to intercede with Leonardo to avoid divorce.
70	"Tú me reviviste Victoria"	24 November 2023	2.3
Roberta demonstrates her good heart by bringing gifts and toys to the orphan girls in the church. Ramiro admits that Victoria has kept all her initial promises and she takes the opportunity to invite him to dream of a better life for him and his family. Leonardo confronts Victoria asking her to tell him Sara's secret she agreed to keep. Leonardo admits to Victoria that his marriage is a sham and from the moment he met her, he came back to life after losing Emilia.
71	"Yo sé quién es Victoria"	27 November 2023	2.3
Roberta surprises Leonardo in a compromising situation with Victoria and he is not afraid to confess that he is interested in her. Gael seeks out María José to clarify everything about their relationship, but she rejects him for having kissed Cayetana. Leonardo asks Victoria if she is willing to have a relationship with him once he separates from Sara.
72	"¿Por qué no me dice que es Emilia?"	28 November 2023	2.4
Roberta pressures Sara to do everything to get Victoria out of Leonardo's way for everyone's sake. Roberta asks Victoria to stay away from Leonardo because of the image she may cause in her family and in their political life. Leonardo insists on divorcing Sara, but she is sure that he will run into Victoria's arms so she asks him for another chance. Leonardo looks for Victoria to talk about Sara, but her reaction makes him suspect that Emilia is still alive.
73	"Te odio, Victoria"	29 November 2023	2.3
Sara finds Victoria at Nico's school and questions her about her presence there. Nico invites Victoria to his house and asks Sara's permission by calling her mom. Sara assures Nico that Victoria wants to separate her family, all because of an attempted affair with Leonardo. Victoria arrives at Nico's house, but gets an unpleasant surprise as he says he hates her for wanting to separate his family. Victoria promises Nico not to intervene in his parents' relationship, but she suspects that Roberta or Sara are behind his reaction.
74	"Lo nuestro es imposible, Leonardo"	30 November 2023	2.2
Fidel insists on presenting Roberta as his wife, but she assures him that her only interest is money and power. Victoria decides to confront Sara and Roberta because of the trouble they got her into with Nico. Victoria threatens Sara for badmouthing her and asks her not to get into trouble again because she could pay dearly for it. Leonardo can no longer hide his feelings and confesses to Victoria how he feels about her and kisses her.
75	"Todo le sale mal a Victoria"	1 December 2023	2.4
Gael rescues María José from Cayetana's prank and asks her to give him a chance. Sebastián asks Miriam to return to his side, but she refuses completely and everything is complicated by the presence of Adalberto. The intoxicated food causes severe health problems for the miners, but Victoria's appearance puts the workers at ease. Emilia confesses to Sebastián that she knows the role Sara plays in Nico's life and regrets hurting him.
76	"Un jaque mate para Victoria"	4 December 2023	2.1
The miners' relatives confront Victoria for having caused their loved ones to be in the hospital. All this after Roberta talks to them. Sara manages to control the miners' relatives and the press who question what happened. Roberta arrives home and sees Gael wearing Mauricio's sweater and can't stop thinking about her son. Sebastián asks Emilia to give him a chance to show her what he can do for her.
77	"Victoria tiene una relación conmigo"	5 December 2023	2.3
Danilo asks Sara to run away together, but she confesses that Romina is his daughter. Roberta tries once again to control María José, but after a strong argument, she asks Roberta to leave the house and return her money. Victoria is sued for having poisoned the miners with food and in the midst of trying to arrest her, Leonardo manages to save her. Leonardo tries to convince Victoria to start a relationship with him, but Sebastián surprises him with the news that she is in a relationship with him.
78	"Quiero corresponderte, Sebastián"	6 December 2023	2.6
Zaira confronts Roberta for ordering an attack against Gael to separate him from María José. El Tigre fears the consequences of the fight between Zaira and Roberta and asks Gael and María José to separate. Emilia decides to try to reciprocate the love that Sebastián has given her despite rejecting him so many times. Roberta complains to Leonardo for not idolizing her in the same way Mauricio did and rejects him as her son.
79	"Te amo Victoria"	7 December 2023	2.2
Victoria thanks Fidel for his support and offers him her help in case he needs it. Leonardo questions Victoria's motives for being with Sebastián and asks her to leave him, because he is in love with her. Fidel refuses to continue helping Roberta, as he has lost interest in her and warns her that he has strong evidence against her if she ever decides to attack him.
80	"Victoria y Emilia son tan parecidas"	8 December 2023	2.3
Danilo ignores Sara's refusals and uses his skills to get to know his daughter, Romi. Fidel visits Victoria determined to invite her on a date, but Roberta ruins his plans. Leonardo discovers Sara meeting with Danilo and assumes that she is being unfaithful, so he confronts them. Roberta begins to notice all the coincidences between Emilia and Victoria.
81	"Todos sabrán que Emilia Sánchez está viva"	11 December 2023	2.2
Nico finds Victoria at Emilia's grave, confides in her that he escaped from his house and asks her not to say anything to Roberta. María José complains to Gael for seeing Cayetana while they were supposedly still together and they end up arguing. Roberta asks Fidel for help to take advantage of all the mine's resources and also to put an end to Victoria before she tries the same. Sara pretends that Romina is sick to prevent Leonardo from continuing with his divorce proceedings.
82	"Tenemos que deshacernos de Victoria"	12 December 2023	2.3
Zaira complains to Tigre for his bad attitude in the face of adversity and seeing that he has no interest in changing, she decides to separate from him. Victoria offers Gigi all her moral and economic support to continue with her candidacy for municipal president, as she is sure she will win. Ezequiel finds a cell phone behind the bar and when he takes it to Fidel they discover that it belongs to Elvira, making Roberta suspect that Victoria is behind her steps. Victoria warns Roberta what will happen if she finds out that she poisoned the miners to affect her position.
83	"Todo lo que has hecho es un crimen, Roberta"	13 December 2023	2.3
María José asks Leonardo to intervene regarding Roberta, as she claims she is going crazy. Victoria discovers Roberta's fear that Emilia will return to make her pay for everything she has done to her. María José asks for Victoria's help to confront Roberta and Victoria decides to integrate her into the board of directors. Roberta complains to Leonardo for working with Victoria against her and he throws in her face all the crimes she has committed in the name of the mine.
84	"No te vas a llevar a Nico"	14 December 2023	2.4
Danilo proposes to Sara that they run away together and she confesses to him that although she loves him, her disappearance could cost her life. During his medical consultation, the doctor points out to Tigre that there is a small chance that he will walk again but Tigre dismisses it fearing failure. Leonardo gets tired of Sara's manipulations, packs his things and leaves despite the consequences he could face. Upon learning of Leonardo's separation, Roberta demands back custody of Nico and throws in his face that they never reached a legal agreement.
85	"Quiero que hagas el amor conmigo, Emilia"	15 December 2023	2.2
Victoria is surprised to receive a call from Nico asking for help to run away from home. Sebastián takes Emilia on a romantic serenade and she decides to give herself to him but they are interrupted by Leonardo. Roberta digs up Emilia's grave to do a DNA test to check if she died in the fire. Victoria complains to Tigre for giving up on the possibility of walking again and he recognizes Emilia's spirit.
86	"¡Sara está muerta!"	18 December 2023	2.4
Sara asks Adalberto to advise her on how to be ruthless in order to wipe out all her competition, just as Roberta does. Victoria advises Nico to never stop being himself despite Roberta's advice and he confesses the affection he has learned to have for her. María José begs Roberta to free Joaquina from the charges against her no matter what the price. Roberta asks Fidel to marry her but he refuses, assuring her that she would be the only one to benefit from the union. Sara decides to swallow some pills to end her life.
87	"Victoria y Emilia son la misma"	19 December 2023	N/A
Danilo complains to Emilia for trying to stop him from helping Sara now that she is hospitalized. Roberta warns Victoria that she is about to unmask someone and gives her a clue by calling her Emilia. Gael asks Cayetana to be his girlfriend to convince her to testify on Joaquina's behalf and she begins to plan their wedding. After learning that Roberta exhumed Emilia's grave for DNA analysis, Victoria goes to Joaquina to obtain evidence against her. Danilo catches Sara in perfect health and confronts her for deceiving everyone.
88	"Nunca te he querido, Leonardo"	20 December 2023	N/A
Roberta confesses to Leonardo that she hates him, because since he was a child, he has prevented her happiness. Sara tries to get Leonardo to stay by her side by admitting her desire to return to the time when they were truly happy together. Fidel offers Victoria his help to resolve Joaquina's situation in exchange for her withdrawing her support for Gigi's campaign. Leonardo proposes to give Tigre a say on the mine's board of directors and when it is put to a vote, María José has the deciding vote.
89	"Te vas a la cárcel conmigo, Roberta"	21 December 2023	N/A
Roberta swears to Joaquina that she will reveal her secret, but Joaquina threatens to reveal that she killed Leonardo's father. María José fulfills her part of the deal with Roberta in order to free Joaquina and votes against Victoria and Leonardo's recommendation. Roberta tries to prove that Victoria is really Emilia, but when she shows Fidel the DNA test she ordered, she makes a fool of herself. Victoria takes Leonardo to the place where Roberta's people take the mine waste to deal with it illegally. Danilo proves to Leonardo that Romina is his daughter and Sara was cheating on him all along.
90	"Aquí está tu Emilia, papá"	22 December 2023	N/A
María José sets aside her deal with Roberta and intervenes to help Nico return home with Leonardo. Leonardo confronts Sara for lying to him about Romina's paternity. El Tigre seeks out Victoria to find out if she is really Emilia and she confesses that she is his daughter. Roberta learns that the person in charge of the DNA tests died after being chased by Sebastián.
91	"Vamos a detener a Roberta"	25 December 2023	N/A
Roberta receives a warning that someone is behind her steps, making it clear that they know all about Ignacio's death. María José wants Victoria's help to get rid of the agreement she made with Roberta in exchange for Joaquina's freedom but suspects that she is allied with Roberta in her crimes. Victoria decides to reveal her true identity to María José. Joaquina looks for Victoria to confess Roberta's crimes but is surprised to find that she knows more than one of her secrets.
92	"Soy tu incondicional, Victoria"	26 December 2023	N/A
Roberta demands that María José sign the application for a loan for the mine and she refuses despite Roberta's threats. Victoria shows up at the political event but Gigi is shocked to see that she supports her opponent, Sara. Marat arrives in Mexico ready to support Victoria in whatever is necessary to raise the mine. Victoria finds clues to the embezzlement of the mine but is disappointed to see that the account to which the money was sent is in Leonardo's name.
93	"Confiesa tu mentira, Sara"	27 December 2023	N/A
Leonardo confronts Sara for lying to him about their daughter and their relationship. Sara tries to evade the issue by blaming Emilia for more mistakes. Tigre asks Gael to help Zaira find a good man so that she can be happy. Roberta finds Victoria with Nico and his sister, so she does not hesitate to threaten her with revealing her true identity. Sebastián and Sara find Leonardo and Victoria together, so they suspect an infidelity.
94	"Sé que tú eres Emilia Sánchez"	28 December 2023	N/A
Emilia and María José realize that Roberta has brought her to the brink of ruin, just as she did with the San Lorenzo mine. Roberta demands Nico to return home or she will make all his loved ones pay for his betrayal. El Tigre forces Emilia and Sebastián to commit to marriage whether he survives his surgery or not. Victoria demands that Roberta release Nico so he can live with Leonardo, but Roberta warns her that she knows who she really is.
95	"Soy tu peor pesadilla, Roberta"	29 December 2023	N/A
Victoria admits to Roberta that she is Emilia and confesses that she did not come back for Leonardo, but to make her pay for all her crimes. El Tigre meets his ex-wife in the afterlife and she gives him the choice of staying by her side or surviving the surgery. Victoria offers Nico the chance to return home with Leonardo, but he despises her, assuring her that he never wants to see her again. Joaquina offers Nico a chance to run away from Roberta assuring him that she never keeps her word.
96	"Leonardo es mi hijo"	1 January 2024	N/A
Emilia feels desperate that she can't find any clues to incriminate Roberta and fears that she will beat her again. Seeing that Nico and Joaquina are not home, Roberta realizes that she was betrayed by her. Victoria meets with Nico and Joaquina and remembering that she has a son whom she misses, Nico offers to be an "adoptive family". Joaquina confesses to Emilia that the reason why she has always gone out of her way to protect Leonardo is because she is his mother.
97	"Joaquina es tu madre"	2 January 2024	N/A
Marat takes advantage of his date with Zaira to ask her to be his life partner and travel around the world. Gael gets tired of rejecting Cayetana's love and makes it clear that the one he loves is María José. Roberta confesses to Joaquina that she is the one to blame for Esteban's death. Leonardo despises Joaquina for having killed Ignacio but Victoria interrupts him with the truth.
98	"Yo sé que tú eres Emilia"	3 January 2024	2.4
Sara agrees to run away with Danilo and Romina but first she needs time to make a plan after being named municipal president. Leonardo questions Victoria's interest in Roberta and suspects that she is allied with her. Leonardo confesses to Victoria that he was a victim of Sara's deceptions and that he was never unfaithful to Emilia. Leonardo asks Victoria to finally admit that she is really Emilia.
99	"Emilia ya no existe"	4 January 2024	2.4
Victoria explains to Leonardo the reason why she could never go back to her former life even if she could bring Roberta down. Joaquina reveals to María José her relationship with Roberta and the reason why she registered Leonardo as her son. Victoria admits to Leonardo that she has not stopped loving him and they make love. Ezequiel finds Victoria's hideout and arrests her to serve time for her crime.
100	"Nuestra familia, nuestra Emilia"	5 January 2024	2.7
Danilo convinces Sara to flee before the inauguration to protect Romina from Roberta's threats. Victoria reveals to Nico that she is really Emilia and has returned to get her family back and be happy. Sara decides to return to the inauguration as an act of love for Romina. Feeling helpless because of the dangers that threaten his family, El Tigre makes an effort to walk again.
101	"Emilia está armada y es peligrosa"	8 January 2024	2.8
El Tigre leaves everyone speechless when he walks into the mine and defends his family from Roberta's evil deeds. Leonardo wants to take justice into his own hands, but for this he must leave his family. Emilia finds Leonardo's letter in which he says goodbye, but later manages to find him and talk about his plans with Roberta. Fidel reveals to Orlando that he killed his mother and assures him that he will do the same to him if he betrays him; Aleida surprises them armed. Patricio emphasizes his love for Roberta, but she rejects him, but he decides to rape her.
102	"Vas a acabar muerta, Sara"	9 January 2024	3.0
Sara discovers part of Roberta's evil deeds and plans to corner her. Roberta begins to lose her allies and Patricio knows he has little time left to live so he agrees to testify against her. Sara goes to Emilia's house and prevents a tragedy which causes Roberta's dismay that Sara has turned her back on her. Roberta finds Sara with Emilia and Leonardo so she decides to kill them.
103	"Roberta Castro queda arrestada"	10 January 2024	3.0
Sara is in critical condition after being shot by Roberta, so she decides to call Danilo to ask him to take care of her daughter. Roberta asks Emilia to kill her, but the latter prefers the justice system. Danilo receives the news that Sara needs an urgent transplant to stay alive. Emilia and her family arrive with Roberta to be arrested and everyone is surprised by Fidel's decision to take her to prison.
104	"No hay nada bueno en Roberta Castro"	11 January 2024	3.3
Joaquina must share her cell with Roberta and assures her that justice will finally be done. Roberta pretends to feel sick to get Joaquina's attention and try to kill her, but Leonardo shows up to stop her. Danilo prays for Sara's health and pleads to be compatible to donate his organ. Roberta does everything to escape, but an operative intercepts the van in which the she is traveling and receives a surprise from Adalberto, who points shotgun at her.
105	"Al final gana Roberta Castro"	12 January 2024	2.7
Sara is surprised to learn that Emilia is the only person compatible with her to donate a kidney. Seeing himself defeated by Roberta, Adalberto begs her for mercy but she kills him. Leonardo despises Joaquina when he learns why she didn't free him from the guilt of Esteban's death. Joaquina meets with Roberta, who asks for her life in exchange for leaving Leonardo alone.
106	"Es demasiado tarde para Roberta Castro"	14 January 2024	3.2
107	"Emilia y Leonardo, juntos para siempre"	14 January 2024	3.2
Joaquina defends herself from Roberta's attack, but fears she has killed her. Orlando confronts Fidel to prevent him from escaping. Nico begs Roberta to let him be happy with Emilia and she decides to set him free. Emilia confronts Roberta once again to save Nico from her, but Roberta is ready to pour acid on her. Leonardo arrives to save Emilia and shoots Roberta, causing her to pour the acid on herself. Emilia forgives Roberta despite all the pain she caused her, but Roberta's health worsens to the point of being declared dead. Roberta survives the hospital but ends up losing her sanity and living off Joaquina's kindness. Leonardo and Emilia get married and celebrate their wedding surrounded by their loved ones.

== Reception ==
=== Ratings ===
Viewership and ratings per season of Minas de pasión
Season	Timeslot (CT)	Episodes	First aired		Last aired		Avg. viewers (millions)
Season	Timeslot (CT)	Episodes	Date	Viewers (millions)	Date	Viewers (millions)	Avg. viewers (millions)
1	Mon–Fri 6:30 p.m.	95	21 August 2023	2.4	14 January 2024	3.2	2.36

=== Awards and nominations ===
Year	Award	Category	Nominated	Result	Ref
2024	Produ Awards	Best Lead Actress - Telenovela	Livia Brito	Nominated	
2024	Produ Awards	Best Lead Actor - Telenovela	Osvaldo de León	Nominated	
