= M.D.: Life on the Line =

Mexican telenovela

- Genre: Telenovela
- Created by: José Alberto Castro
- Written by: Vanesa Varela; Fernando Garcilita; María Chávez González; Ricardo Avilés
- Directed by: Ana Lorena Pérez Ríos; Santiago Barbosa
- Creative director: Sandra Cortés
- Theme music composer: Oskar Gritten; Carlos Páramo
- Opening theme: "Médicos"
- Composers: Octavio Castañeda; Silvana Medrano
- Country of origin: Mexico
- Original language: Spanish
- No. of seasons: 1
- No. of episodes: 87

Production
- Executive producer: José Alberto Castro
- Producers: Ernesto Hernández; Fausto Sáinz
- Cinematography: Bernardo Nájera; Mauricio Manzano
- Editors: Juan Ordóñez; Héctor Flores; Arturo Rodríguez
- Camera setup: Multi-camera
- Production company: Televisa

Original release
- Network: Las Estrellas
- Release: 11 November 2019 – 8 March 2020

M.D.: Life on the Line (Spanish: Médicos, línea de vida) is a Mexican telenovela that premiered on Las Estrellas on 11 November 2019. The series is produced by José Alberto Castro for Televisa, and stars Livia Brito, Daniel Arenas and Rodolfo Salas. Production began in August 2019.

On 7 February 2020, producer José Alberto Castro confirmed that the series had been renewed for a second season. However, production plans were later canceled due to new management at Televisa, following corporate restructuring.

== Plot ==
Set in a hospital staffed by the most brilliant doctors in their field, the series follows the story of Gonzalo Olmedo, an idealist and dedicated internist. Gonzalo is appointed director of the hospital after the assassination of his predecessor. Upon assuming his position, he discovers the complexities of operating a hospital teeming with the deficiencies associated with bureaucracy and corruption at the top echelons of its prior administration. To carry out the transformation, Gonzalo recruits a group of leading professionals who heal the most complex cases and, at the same time, strive to heal the wounds of their personal lives.

== Cast ==
=== Main ===
- Livia Brito as Regina Villaseñor
- Daniel Arenas as David Paredes
- Grettell Valdez as Ana Caballero
- José Elías Moreno Jr. as Gonzalo Olmedo
- Carlos de la Mota as Luis Galván
- Isabel Burr as Cinthia Guerrero
- Marisol del Olmo as Constanza Madariaga
- Erika de la Rosa as Mireya Navarro
- Rodrigo Murray as René Castillo
- Federico Ayos as Rafael Calderón
- Daniel Tovar as Daniel Juárez
- Dalilah Polanco as Luz González
- Scarlet Gruber as Tania Olivares
- Mauricio Henao as Marco Zavala
- Lorena García as Pamela Miranda
- Michel López as Diego Martínez
- Rodolfo Salas as Arturo Molina
- Jorge Ortiz de Pinedo as Dr. Enrique Lara
- Iliana Fox as Susana Álvarez
- Osvaldo de León as Sergio Ávila
- Luis Gatica as Paco Juárez
- Raquel Garza as Elena Estrada
- Eugenia Cauduro as Patricia Antúnez
- Irineo Álvarez as Andrés Guerrero
- Lía Ferré as Cecilia Núñez
- María Alicia Delgado as Martha
- Miguel Pizarro as Esteban Zavala
- Carina Ricco as Pilar de Miranda
- Roberto Miguel as Agustín Miranda
- Eugenio Montessoro as Santiago Montesinos
- Ricardo Mendonza "El Coyote" as Miguel
- Jaime Maqueo as Gabriel Galván Álvarez
- Karen Furlong as Carolina "Caro"

=== Guest stars ===
- Altair Jarabo as Victoria Escalante
- Guillermo García Cantú as Alonso Vega
- José María Torre as Roberto Morelli
- David Zepeda as Ricardo Bustamante
- Julián Gil as Carlos Ibarra

== Ratings ==
Viewership and ratings per season of M.D.: Life on the Line
Season	Episodes	First aired		Last aired		Avg. viewers (millions)
Season	Episodes	Date	Viewers (millions)	Date	Viewers (millions)	Avg. viewers (millions)
1	87	11 November 2019	2.7	8 March 2020	3.5	TBD

== Episodes ==
No.	Title	Original release date	Mexico viewers (millions)
1	"Mal diagnóstico"	11 November 2019 (Note: Premiered early online through Las Estrellas website on 9 November 2019.)	2.7
The Institute of Medical Specialties receives 20 children injured because of a car accident caused by a heart attack suffered by Braulio while driving. Dr. Lara announces to the parents the health status of the victims. Regina and Gonzalo manage to stabilize an injured person from the accident. Aníbal asks Dr. Lara for help to check on his son, who was also a victim of the car accident, but he is denied medical attention. René along with Mireya, divert cannulas and medical resources to sell them to the black market. The next day, Aníbal returns to the hospital with his son in a critical condition, but doctors give him no hope, because he had internal injuries that affected his son's organs. Aníbal tells the doctors that he took his son for a check-up, which Dr. Lara denied, giving him a negligent situation on the part of the doctor. Aníbal, believing that his son was killed by Dr. Lara, runs towards the doctor in a fit of rage and slaps him, but doctors restrain him and expel him from the hospital under Dr. Lara's orders. Later, Dr. Lara enters his office, which to his surprise he finds Aníbal, in order to avenge the death of his son, kills Dr. Lara with a shot.
2	"El nuevo director del Instituto de Especialidades Médicas"	12 November 2019	2.6
Dr. Lara dies on the way to the operating room, after the bullet Aníbal hit him in the head with. René blames Gonzalo for what happened, and for not having order in the emergency department. To which Sergio asks to spend more time together with Regina. The hospital board of directors meets to see who stays as the new hospital director.
3	"Hacer bien nuestro trabajo"	13 November 2019	2.7
Ana does not agree that Gonzalo is the director and René will try to remove him from the position. Gonzalo appoints Regina the new Chief of Emergency.
4	"La vida que prometiste tener"	14 November 2019	2.9
Ana and René conspire against Gonzalo. Susana is tired of dealing with the working life of Luis and Regina begins her work as Chief of Emergency.
5	"Los nuevos residentes"	15 November 2019	2.9
Gonzalo welcomes three new residents to the Institute of Medical Specialties. Regina and Ana argue over staff management.
6	"Jamás te lo voy a perdonar"	18 November 2019	2.7
Regina upon arriving at her home, discovers Sergio having sex with a swinger couple. Sergio apologizes to Regina and tries to explain how the situation was, but she kicks him out of the house. The next day, for staying talking with Sergio for a while, Regina forgets her meeting with Ana. Later, Ana asks Regina to respect her schedules and accuses her with Gonzalo to do her job well as emergency chief.
7	"Ambiente sano"	19 November 2019	2.7
Regina, distraught with what happened with Sergio, talks to Gonzalo to tell her that she resigns the position of chief of emergency, because she does not have the most concentration due to Sergio cheating, to which Gonzalo refuses to receive her resignation as head and supports her morally. Regina asks Ana for a moment to review and sign the schedule with the rotations of the doctors who are going to support her, but she has a rude attitude and refuses to view the folder with the documents to be signed. Regina asks Ana to stop being rude, to which Ana asks to stop interfering in her area. Later, Luis goes through the files at Ana's office. Ana asks him to review half of the patients in the waiting room and teases him by telling him to finish as quickly as possible to spend more time with his family, to which Luis is not humiliated. Sergio with a bouquet of flowers waits for Regina at the end of her shift to apologize and for a new opportunity with her, but when she refuses, Sergio tries to kiss her by force, which David goes out to defend her.
8	"No me voy a rendir"	20 November 2019	2.8
Luis receives a patient who does not believe in vaccines. Sergio assures Regina that he will not stop fighting for her. David and Arturo fight in the emergency room.
9	"Atente a las consecuencias"	21 November 2019	2.7
David and Arturo argue while trying to save a patient's life, causing a scandal at the Institute of Medical Specialties.
10	"El respeto se tiene que ganar"	22 November 2019	2.4
Marco arrives believing himself superior to the residents, but Gonzalo and Regina lower him from his cloud. René has a plan to take over the hospital.
11	"No te voy a compartir"	25 November 2019	2.4
Both Ana and Regina are happy with David's medical support. Regina kicks out Sergio from the hospital and René asks Gonzalo to trust him.
12	"No hay vuelta atràs"	26 November 2019	2.4
Regina leaves the house and ends forever with Sergio. Also, confronts Mireya. A new patient with diabetic foot arrives.
13	"No todos tenemos que pagar por eso"	27 November 2019	2.6
Gonzalo informs the team of the budget cut that will be after losing the trial, a fact that unleashes a chaos in the Institute of Medical Specialties.
14	"Te voy a estar vigilando"	28 November 2019	2.4
Ana threatens Regina after the budget cut. A new case will affect David. Mireya conspires against Regina with Fausto.
15	"Violencia intrafamiliar"	29 November 2019	2.7
Inés arrives again with injuries to the Institute of Medical Specialties. Gonzalo invites Regina to live at his home; René and Mireya suspect of them.
16	"Un poquito más de atención"	2 December 2019	2.3
Regina and Cynthia urgently attend Inés, who has returned unconscious and with severe injuries to the body.
17	"Mi único miedo es perderte"	3 December 2019	2.7
Cecilia wants to recover what she had with Arturo and René is about to be discovered by Constanza.
18	"Levantando el instituto"	4 December 2019	2.2
Fausto publishes an article talking about the hospital. Rafael gets high again and Regina will see a patient who arrives with dehydration.
19	"Nadie te va a faltar al respeto"	5 December 2019	2.3
David defends Regina from Leo. Cecilia is diagnosed with anemia and Mireya conspires again against Gonzalo and Regina.
20	"Soy un fracaso"	6 December 2019	2.6
David yells at Tania for missing the guard and she feels disappointed. Mireya requires René to divorce his wife and Inés will make a decision.
21	"A la gente le gusta hablar"	9 December 2019	2.4
René congratulates Gonzalo and Regina for their alleged "relationship." Arturo threatens Cecilia if she doesn't take care of herself. Ana questions David about Regina.
22	"Este lugar es un infierno"	10 December 2019	2.4
David tests Marco. Regina asks Gonzalo to move Mireya to another area and a famous fighter will arrive at the Institute of Medical Specialties.
23	"Hay cosas que no se olvidan"	11 December 2019	2.4
Ana tries to seduce David, Mireya and Regina make peace and Cynthia informs Tirano that he won't be able to fight again.
24	"Necesitamos un diagnostico"	12 December 2019	2.3
Erika arrives very sick at the hospital and doctors do not find what she is suffering from. Mireya and René will remain united to attack Regina.
25	"Las enfermedades no son un castigo"	13 December 2019	2.4
Tania invites Rafa to her house. Erika fears death and confesses the secret that afflicts her. Ana demands respect from Regina again.
26	"¿Por qué siempre tienes que ser tan impulsivo?"	16 December 2019	2.3
Sergio attacks David and he responds to blows. Tania will suffer the contempt of a patient and Erika is already out of danger.
27	"Tania y Rafa hacen el amor"	17 December 2019	2.5
Rafa accepts Tania's invitation to go home. Cynthia's dad rejects her for not leaving the medicine.
28	"Aceptar las cosas como son"	18 December 2019	2.4
Regina must attend impaled men and Luis tries to help Don Héctor, a man who is evicted.
29	"No cargues con culpas"	19 December 2019	N/A
Regina saves impaled men. Daniel catches Tania kissing with Rafa and David receives a summons because of Sergio.
30	"¡Aléjate de ella!"	20 December 2019	N/A
Arturo asks David to leave Regina alone and, in addition, puts a stop to Cecilia's lies. Caro and Jime suffer an accident.
31	"La mejor defensa"	23 December 2019	N/A
Victoria and Roberto, from Vega and associates, arrive at the hospital to help Regina and David with their cases.
32	"Fue un placer ayudarte"	24 December 2019	N/A
Cynthia complains to Rafa for having kissed Tania. Victoria gets Sergio to accept Regina's divorce agreement.
33	"No eres indispensable"	25 December 2019	N/A
René warns David that if he doesn't measure his attitude, he takes him out of the hospital. The death of Don Héctor causes a crisis to Pamela.
34	"Segundas oportunidades"	26 December 2019	N/A
Tania tries to fix her friendship with Daniel. Arturo wants to be happy again and Roberto wins David's case.
35	"Las buenas intenciones no son suficientes"	27 December 2019	N/A
David and Arturo argue for Regina's love. Rafa gets high again. Estela's case baffles the Institute of Medical Specialties.
36	"Fiesta en el hospital"	30 December 2019	N/A
Arturo organizes a Quinceañera party for his patient in the hospital. Rafa continues to raise suspicion for his behavior and someone tries to blackmail him.
37	"Créeme que eres la última mujer de la que quiero estar lejos"	31 December 2019	N/A
David takes advantage of the congress to Puerto Vallarta to approach Regina. Arturo has the same intentions.
38	"Yo estoy mirando en la dirección correcta"	1 January 2020	N/A
Regina is disappointed to find David with Ana. Arturo is honest with Regina and steals a kiss.
39	"Ana me fue a buscar, pero yo la rechacé"	2 January 2020	N/A
David looks for Regina and tries to talk to her. However, she confesses that she saw him with Ana.
40	"Nadie es como tú"	3 January 2020	2.5
Ana looks for David and tries to convince him to resume their relationship and give himself a new opportunity.
41	"Todos van a pagar"	6 January 2020	2.2
Regina punishes residents for the missing money. Gonzalo scolds René for the bad measures taken and a new case comes to the emergency room.
42	"Quiero estar cerca de ti"	7 January 2020	2.8
Gonzalo asks his son for an opportunity to be together. René accuses Gonzalo with Montesino and Diego confesses his robbery.
43	"Ojalá me recuerdes toda la vida"	8 January 2020	2.9
Arturo tells Cecilia that he does not want to see her again and she assures him that it will be so. Tania discovers Rafa's drugs.
44	"Este lugar es un infierno"	9 January 2020	3.1
Arturo is blamed for Cecilia's death. The institute enters a heat crisis causing severe damage.
45	"Es hora de ponerle un alto"	10 January 2020	2.9
René manages Montesinos to demand Gonzalo do his job. Victor insists on suing the institute and Arturo knows that Regina is the woman of his life.
46	"No quiero que los demás paguen por lo que yo hice"	13 January 2020	2.9
David sees Regina and Arturo hugging. Diego confesses to having taken the material and Marco denounces it with René.
47	"Mala praxis"	14 January 2020	3.0
Victor insists on suing the hospital, especially now that Marco corroborates the doctors' mistake. Ana doesn't want David to continue suffering.
48	"René amenaza a Regina"	15 January 2020	2.8
René assures Regina that if she does not control her team, he will take other measures. Gonzalo condones Diego for the robbery.
49	"El apagón"	16 January 2020	3.1
Regina believes that there is something between Ana and David. The transformer fails and the hospital runs out of light.
50	"Alguien quiere que el instituto deje de operar"	17 January 2020	3.1
Gonzalo suspects that hospital problems are intentional. Gabriel, Luis's son, arrives ill in the ER.
51	"Confía en nosotros"	20 January 2020	3.0
Luis is afraid of what happens to his son. David overhears that Regina and Arturo kissed.
52	"Regina siente algo por David"	21 January 2020	2.9
Regina confesses that she likes David. Ana investigates Rafa and Tania tells Cynthia that he is taking controlled medications.
53	"Rafa reconoce tener un problema de adicción"	22 January 2020	3.0
Rafa confesses to Gonzalo and Cynthia that he is addicted to drugs and asks for help. Natalia questions Samuel about the relationship with her sister.
54	"Lo mejor que podemos hacer es apoyarlo"	23 January 2020	3.1
Rafa confesses his addiction to his teammates. Ana and Regina fight again and Paulina comes to save Gabriel's life.
55	"Línea directa"	24 January 2020	3.0
The Undersecretary of Health empowers René to administer the hospital. Susana doesn't want Paulina to attend to her son.
56	"¡David y Regina se besan!"	27 January 2020	3.0
David confesses to Regina being jealous of Arturo and kisses her. Natalia stabs her sister.
57	"No se van a tolerar errores"	28 January 2020	3.1
René fires Diego from the hospital in front of everyone. Gabriel gets worse and Susana blames Paulina for his severity.
58	"David y Regina tienen su primera cita"	29 January 2020	2.8
David and Regina go out to dinner. Gabriel's life is in danger. Natalia surrenders to the authorities.
59	"La muerte de Gabriel"	30 January 2020	3.1
Luis tries to save his son, but Regina and Paulina say there is nothing to do; Susana blames Paulina for Gabriel's death.
60	"¿Por qué no me diste una oportunidad a mí?"	31 January 2020	3.0
Arturo explodes knowing that Regina and David are dating. Ana confesses to David her past and how much she needs him.
61	"No me amenaces, Arturo"	3 February 2020	2.9
Arturo looks for David to tell him that he will be watching Regina. David feels threatened and sets a limit.
62	"Gonzalo tiene los días contados en el hospital"	4 February 2020	3.4
Gonzalo leaves the event after knowing that Aurora is hospitalized and René takes the opportunity to speak against him.
63	"¡Eres un cobarde!"	5 February 2020	3.3
Javier leaves Aurora under Gonzalo's care. Ana asks Arturo to protect Regina from David.
64	"Regina y David hacen el amor"	6 February 2020	3.0
Regina and David spend the night together; He declares his love. Mireya will not continue helping René.
65	"No te ilusiones demasiado"	7 February 2020	3.0
Ana warns Regina about David and confesses that they had a relationship in the past. Luis does not overcome Gabriel's loss.
66	"Carmen sufre una sobredosis"	10 February 2020	3.0
Carmen is found lying on the street and Rafa saves her. David confronts Ana for revealing their past relationship to Regina.
67	"René y Mireya le tienden una trampa a Gonzalo"	11 February 2020	3.1
René and Mireya's plan to make Gonzalo removed from office works, accusing him of misusing the hospital's resources, meanwhile, Regina attends to a famous former singer with respiratory problems and a history of cancer.
68	"Gonzalo es destituido como director del hospital"	12 February 2020	3.1
The Undersecretary of Health ceases Gonzalo from his post and now René is the new director of the hospital.
69	"La verdad siempre sale a la luz"	13 February 2020	3.3
Gonzalo knows that René is behind everything and confronts him; Alonso Vega decides to take his case.
70	"Eres peor de lo que pensé"	14 February 2020	3.0
René fires Gonzalo from the hospital and Pamela offers his help to Carmen to find her daughter.
71	"Mi mano derecha"	17 February 2020	3.2
René proposes Ana to be the new administrative director. Gonzalo and Aurora forgive each other and Regina argues with René.
72	"La nueva directora administrativa del instituto"	18 February 2020	3.2
Ana accepts René's proposal and takes advantage of her position to make adjustments in the ER. David and Arturo fight with blows.
73	"Regina corre a David del Instituto"	19 February 2020	3.2
Regina, pressured by René, dismisses David from the hospital and also ends her relationship with him.
74	"Regina y Mireya pelean"	20 February 2020	3.3
Pamela discovers that Carmen is her mother. Ricardo will help in Gonzalo's case. Regina explodes against Mireya.
75	"El nuevo jefe de Consulta Externa"	21 February 2020	3.3
David returns to the hospital and learns that Regina preferred to fire him over Arturo.
76	"Carlos Ibarra amenaza a Regina"	24 February 2020	3.3
Carlos requires Regina to attend to his client. Paulina visits Susana, Gonzalo and René will fight again.
77	"El Ciego ingresa al Instituto de Especialidades Médicas"	25 February 2020	3.0
Carlos requires Regina to attend El Ciego well and bribes René so that his client receives visits. Michelle and El Cuervo visit the offender.
78	"Un nuevo corazón"	26 February 2020	3.2
Susana confesses to Luis that she still loves him. Ana sanctions the doctors and Michelle accepts El Ciego's deal.
79	"No hemos vencido a la enfermedad"	27 February 2020	3.3
Aurora gets worse and Gonzalo will seek to beat the treatment. El Ciego leaves the institute and Rafa wants something serious with Cinthia.
80	"Déjame demostrarte que soy la mujer que necesitas"	28 February 2020	3.1
Ana insists with David to resume the relationship and Arturo tells Regina that he is the one for her. Ricardo seeks to unmask René.
81	"Constanza descubre que René y Mireya son amantes"	2 March 2020	3.0
Aurora decides to continue the treatment, René and Mireya are discovered by Constanza.
82	"Siempre vas a hacer la otra"	3 March 2020	3.2
Constanza fights with Mireya and kicks out René from the house. Esteban hits Marco and a crisis invades the institute.
83	"La verdad de nuestro lado"	4 March 2020	3.2
Gonzalo speaks with Vega and Associates to inform them of the relationship between Mireya and René. Ana helps Regina in the emergency room.
84	"René corre a Mireya del Instituto de Especialidades Médicas"	5 March 2020	3.3
René dismisses Mireya in front of Constanza. Arturo reiterates his love for Regina. Marco's patient dies.
85	"Regina es acusada de ser cómplice de Gonzalo"	6 March 2020	3.4
Regina receives a subpoena to testify. Vega y Asociados already has the strategy for defense and David suffers an accident.
86	"Quédate conmigo, David"	8 March 2020	3.5
87	"La línea que divide a la vida"	8 March 2020	3.5
Regina suffers from seeing David delicate and hands the proof to Vega and Associates to denounce René. An important witness will change the course of the trial against Gonzalo and a great secret from the hospital director will come to light.

== Awards and nominations ==
Year	Award	Category	Nominated	Result
2020	TVyNovelas Awards	Best Telenovela of the Year	José Alberto Castro	Nominated
2020	TVyNovelas Awards	Best Antagonist Actor	Rodrigo Murray	Won
2020	TVyNovelas Awards	Best Leading Actor	José Elías Moreno Jr.	Nominated
2020	TVyNovelas Awards	Best Best Co-lead Actress	Grettell Valdez	Nominated
2020	TVyNovelas Awards	Best Best Co-lead Actor	Carlos de la Mota	Nominated
2020	TVyNovelas Awards	Best Direction of the Cameras	Bernardo Nájera	Nominated
2020	TVyNovelas Los Favoritos del Público	The Most Beautiful Villain	Grettell Valdez	Won
2020	TVyNovelas Los Favoritos del Público	The Most Handsome Guy	Daniel Arenas	Won
2020	TVyNovelas Los Favoritos del Público	The Most Handsome Guy	Carlos de la Mota	Nominated
2020	TVyNovelas Los Favoritos del Público	The Most Beautiful Woman	Livia Brito	Nominated
2020	TVyNovelas Los Favoritos del Público	The Most Beautiful Woman	Grettell Valdez	Nominated
2020	TVyNovelas Los Favoritos del Público	Favorite Couple	Daniel Arenas and Livia Brito	Nominated
2020	TVyNovelas Los Favoritos del Público	The Most Beautiful Smile	Livia Brito	Won
2020	TVyNovelas Los Favoritos del Público	The Most Handsome Senior	José Elías Moreno Jr.	Nominated
2020	TVyNovelas Los Favoritos del Público	The Most Handsome Senior	Rodrigo Murray	Nominated
2020	TVyNovelas Los Favoritos del Público	Best Finale	José Alberto Castro	Nominated
2020	TVyNovelas Los Favoritos del Público	Best Cast	Médicos, línea de vida	Nominated
