= Mujer de nadie =

Mexican telenovela

- Genre: Telenovela
- Based on: Amarte es mi pecado by Liliana Abud
- Written by: Leonardo Bechini; María Elena López; Claudio Lacelli
- Directed by: Juan Pablo Blanco; Fabián Corres
- Starring: Livia Brito; Marcus Ornellas; Arap Bethke
- Theme music composer: María León; Marcela de la Garza
- Opening theme: "Divina maldición" by María León
- Composer: Jordi Bachbush
- Country of origin: Mexico
- Original language: Spanish
- No. of seasons: 1
- No. of episodes: 45

Production
- Executive producer: Giselle González
- Producer: Julieta de la O
- Editors: Irving Rosas; Gabriela Torres; Alma Hernández
- Camera setup: Multi-camera
- Production company: TelevisaUnivision

Original release
- Network: Las Estrellas
- Release: 13 June – 12 August 2022

Mujer de nadie (English title: A Woman of Her Own) is a Mexican telenovela that aired on Las Estrellas from 13 June 2022 to 12 August 2022. The series is produced by Giselle González for TelevisaUnivision, and is based on the 2004 telenovela Amarte es mi pecado created by Liliana Abud. It stars Livia Brito and Marcus Ornellas.

== Plot ==
Lucía (Livia Brito) lives in Cholula, with her father Jacobo and her stepmother Isaura, an ambitious and cruel woman. She is in love with Alfredo, but he only wants to take advantage of her innocence and purity. When Jacobo suffers a heart attack, Alfredo and Isaura seek to offer Lucía to Heriberto, the richest and most powerful man in town, who is in love with Lucía. While trying to escape from Heriberto, Lucía meets Fernando, whom she falls in love with. Lucia is evicted from her home by Heriberto's orders and has to live with her aunt Alejandra, her mother's sister, who lives with Casilda, her goddaughter. Lucía and Fernando must face several enemies that oppose their happiness.

== Cast ==
=== Main ===
- Livia Brito as Lucía Arizmendi
- Marcus Ornellas as Fernando Ortega
- Arap Bethke as Alfredo
- Azela Robinson as Alejandra
- Cynthia Klitbo as Isaura
- Plutarco Haza as Rafael
- María Penella as Casilda
- Juana Arias as Paulina
- Carmen Aub as Roxana
- Alexa Martín as Michelle
- Sergio Bonilla as Diego
- Ignacio Tahhan as Leonardo
- Luis Arrieta as Carlos
- Rosa María Bianchi as Gertrudis
- Verónica Langer as Martha
- Verónica Merchant as Pilar
- Adalberto Parra as Juventino
- Enrique Singer as Gabino
- Roberto Soto as Heriberto
- Ale Müller as Claudia
- Francisco Pizaña as Pedro
- Ignacio Riva Palacio as Néstor
- Clarisa González as Silvia
- Catalina López as Dominga
- Kristel Klitbo as Antonia

=== Guest stars ===
- Marco Treviño as Jacobo

== Production ==
Filming of the series began on 7 March 2022, and concluded on 6 July 2022. The first teaser was shown on 16 May 2022.

== Ratings ==
Viewership and ratings per season of Mujer de nadie
Season	Timeslot (CT)	Episodes	First aired		Last aired		Avg. viewers (millions)
Season	Timeslot (CT)	Episodes	Date	Viewers (millions)	Date	Viewers (millions)	Avg. viewers (millions)
1	Mon–Fri 9:30 p.m.	45	13 June 2022	3.0	12 August 2022	3.3	2.87

== Episodes ==
No.	Title	Mexico air date	U.S. air date	Mexico viewers (millions)	U.S. viewers (millions)
1	"Todo mundo tiene un precio"	13 June 2022	28 June 2022	3.0	1.30
Alfredo questions Lucía about their wedding, she assures him that it is not the right time, when Lucía sees Heriberto she gets uncomfortable and leaves. Lucía prevents the police from removing the artisans from the commercial passage. Isaura buys different medications for Jacobo. Lucía sees Alfredo's insistence on leaving San Jacinto and asks him if he is running away from something. Heriberto tries to abuse Lucía, but she manages to save herself and when she escapes she meets Fernando.
2	"Yo voy a hacer que se haga justicia"	14 June 2022	29 June 2022	3.2	1.18
Lucía reveals to Fernando that Heriberto tried to rape her and asks him to go with her to report him; however, the authorities believe that she is defaming him. Gertrudis asks Heriberto and Juventino to prevent Lucía from continuing with the lawsuit. Lucía is arrested. Jacobo arrives at Heriberto's house to complain about what he did to his daughter, Heriberto assures him that Alfredo betrayed Lucía by sending him some images to his cell phone, also Isaura bet the deeds of his house. Jacobo confronts Isaura and during the discussion, he dies.
3	"¿Cuánto por una sesión privada?"	15 June 2022	30 June 2022	2.9	1.32
Fernando meets Heriberto at the police station and assures him that he is only a coward who hides behind his influences. Feeling attacked, Heriberto asks for Fernando to be removed and warns him to be careful of Lucía. Gertrudis warns Heriberto that neither he nor any other man will ever touch Lucía again. Isaura asks Alfredo that it is time to marry Lucía. Roxana tries to seduce Fernando. Lucía says her last goodbye to her father and when she gets home she discovers that revealing pictures of her are circulating on the net so she thinks it was Heriberto who leaked them, and goes to his house to confront him.
4	"La gente más poderosa"	16 June 2022	1 July 2022	3.0	1.15
Isaura assures Alfredo that Lucía would not have to know anything if he gives her a large sum of money, he accepts the proposal. Lucía gets upset with Alfredo, but Isaura comes to his defense. Gertrudis humiliates Lucía, Lucía assures her that she is Heriberto's accomplice. Alfredo gives the agreed money to Isaura. Claudia is willing to work at anything to have money and help her mother. Lucía finds a photo of a mysterious woman in her father's papers. Pilar learns of Jacobo's death. Gertrudis asks Heriberto to end Lucía. Heriberto decides to evict Lucía from her house and take possession of it after Jacobo supposedly sold it to him. Isaura looks for Alejandra.
5	"Poner las cartas sobre la mesa"	17 June 2022	4 July 2022	2.8	1.07
Valdepeña reports the success of the eviction to Gertrudis. Isaura confronts Alejandra, asking her to help Lucía because it is Jacobo's last wish. Lucía looks for Alfredo for support but he is with Alexa. Isaura arrives with Leonardo, the lawyer Alejandra sent. Alejandra is surprised by Jacobo's last wish because he hated her. Rafael shows the investors the vacated land, which will be demolished to build a shopping mall. Lucía and Isaura are taken to Alejandra's house, Alejandra tells Lucía that she is her aunt. Carlos learns that Paulina did see the face of one of the assailants and testified against him. Casilda discovers Lucía's past and shows it to her godmother, but Alejandra defends Lucía. Roxana delivers the loan that Fernando asked for. Alejandra promises to protect Lucía if she agrees to stay with her. Rafael introduces Roxana as his wife and they celebrate the business deal. Despite having saved the house, Carlos offers the money he got to Fernando and they share a meal with Alfredo. Alfredo looks for Lucía, she meets him in Puebla to tell him everything that has happened to her. On the way to meet Alfredo, Lucía meets Fernando again, Alfredo sees them.
6	"No eres el dueño de mi vida"	20 June 2022	5 July 2022	3.0	1.16
Lucía thanks Fernando for all his support. Roxana asks Fernando that if either of them falls in love, they should tell each other the truth. Lucía tells Alejandra that Heriberto tried to rape her, she makes a confession and Lucía believes that her aunt went through something similar. Alfredo asks Michelle to keep an eye on her brother since he was seen with an unreliable woman. Alejandra complains to Juventino for what Heriberto did to her niece and sends Alfredo to investigate. Alejandra asks Lucía to leave the talavera, but she refuses. Isaura charges Alfredo 15,000 pesos in exchange for keeping an eye on Lucía. Alejandra asks Isaura to prevent Lucía from leaving the house and demands that she get to work. Alfredo surprises Lucía and when he finds out that she will see Fernando, he gets upset and tries to pull her, but she puts a stop to him.
7	"Aquí voy a estar para ti"	21 June 2022	6 July 2022	2.9	1.28
Pilar is sure that Alejandra has already given orders to Lucía and that is why she wants to leave the house. Lucía learns that the artisans have been evicted from the passageway to build a shopping mall. Rafael assures Roxana that nothing will happen to her as long as she remains faithful. Alejandra apologizes to Lucía after she wanted to impose her will and agrees to rent her one of her properties. Lucía tries to find out what Pilar's job is, but Casilda prevents her from discovering the truth. Alfredo shows Heriberto that he has the recording of the attempted abuse of Lucía for which he asks for one million pesos. Alejandra slaps Casilda and assures her that she is nothing like Lucía. Isaura arrives at Alejandra's club to ask for a job. Heriberto refuses to reveal to Juventino the name of the person who published the photographs of Lucía, but Juventino threatens to betray him. Casilda begins to upload sensual photographs to the internet, but covers her face. Rafael meets Lucía and is willing to rent her one of his properties.
8	"Seguir al corazón"	22 June 2022	7 July 2022	3.2	1.40
Alejandra learns that Rafael will lend Lucía a place to continue with her workshop and gets upset with Pilar because she is acting without her consent. Fernando opens his heart to Paulina and reveals that Lucía changed his life. Pilar warns Rafael not to mess with Lucía, but he thinks she is jealous. Fernando reveals to Roxana that he fell in love with Lucía. Paulina cries knowing that Fernando will never notice her. Heriberto gets Alfredo's money, he decides to buy an engagement ring. Diego arrives at Alejandra's club and meets Claudia. Michelle lets Fernando know that there is a woman named Lucía who does not have a very good reputation in San Jacinto. Heriberto assaults Gertrudis. Diego becomes the first man in Claudia's life. Michelle discovers that Alfredo is cheating on her with Lucía and when she sees her arrive at the restaurant, she confesses that he is her boyfriend. Roxana looks for Diego to offer him a business deal.
9	"Todos los hombres son iguales"	23 June 2022	8 July 2022	2.9	1.31
Roxana looks for Diego to offer him a business deal. Michelle begs Alfredo not to leave her. Isaura learns that Lucía broke up with Alfredo. Casilda discovers that Silvia steals money from customers. Lucía informs Fernando that she broke up with her boyfriend, Alfredo looks for her, but she does not want to listen to him. Fernando suspects that Alfredo was unfaithful to his sister. Alejandra warns Rafael that Lucía is untouchable. Alejandra sees Roxana and assures her that she does not hold a grudge for leaving the brothel. Roxana convinces Rafael to invest in Fernando's company. Alejandra tells Pilar that she does not like the way Rafael looks at Lucía. Fernando accompanies Lucía to her house in San Jacinto and surprises her with a kiss.
10	"El tiempo lo cura todo"	24 June 2022	11 July 2022	2.5	1.24
Lucía and Fernando are arrested for trespassing on private property. Casilda asks Silvia to wrap up Leonardo, but in reality it is so that she can sleep with him. Michelle tells Paulina that she found Alfredo with another woman. Pilar fears for her health. Diego opens his heart to Claudia. Lucía assures Fernando that she does not want to leave him. Lucía informs her aunt that Alfredo has not stopped bothering her. Michelle falls for his Alfredo's lies again. Isaura discovers that Casilda bought a sexy dress and threatens to tell Alejandra, Casilda gives her money in exchange for her silence. Michelle arrives at Lucía's workshop to attack her for messing with Alfredo. Fernando finds his sister with Lucía and questions her. Rafael gives a gift to Lucía.
11	"Manipulación de amores"	27 June 2022	12 July 2022	2.8	1.10
Fernando defends Lucía against Michelle's insults. Rafael tries to win Lucía's trust. Pilar reveals to Alejandra that she wants to take a chance with Gabino. Fernando confronts Alfredo with blows and assures him that he will not allow him to continue hurting his sister or Lucía. Michelle arrives at Alfredo's house to live with him, but he kicks her out. Alejandra seeks revenge on Alfredo for what he did to Lucía. Silvia seduces Leonardo as part of the plan, she leaves the room so that Casilda can enter and get to be with him. Fernando surprises Lucía by bringing her the things her friend Toña had. Lucía suggests to Isaura that when the store starts leaving money she should leave work and help her, she refuses. Rafael arrives with Roxana to the signing of the agreement with Fernando.
12	"Nuestra historia de amor"	28 June 2022	13 July 2022	3.1	1.23
Fernando refuses to sign the contract with Rafael and assures Diego that he will not fall into Roxana's trap. Casilda discovers that Isaura has contact with Heriberto. Casilda sees Lucía with Leonardo and warns her not to mess with him since he is hers. Silvia realizes that Claudia is beginning to have feelings for her client. Alejandra begins to settle accounts with Alfredo. Pilar gives herself a chance with Gabino. Alfredo makes Lucía believe that he has a video of when Heriberto tried to hurt her, but in reality it is to set her up. Carlos sends Fernando a photo of Lucía kissing Alfredo. Silvia informs Casilda that Leonardo asked her to have sex. Fernando confronts to Lucia about the kiss she gave Alfredo, she assures him that he kissed her by force.
13	"Lucía le da una oportunidad al amor con uno de sus pretendientes"	29 June 2022	14 July 2022	2.9	1.27
Heriberto finds Gertrudis with Pedro and kicks him out of the house, she stops him. Alejandra asks Rafael to stay away from Lucía. Casilda and Lucía make peace and Casilda reveals that she is in love with Leonardo. Roxana discovers that Rafael sent flowers to Lucía and makes a scene, but he threatens her. Silvia invites Michelle to work at Alejandra's club, but when she learns that it is a brothel, she refuses. Roxana arrives at Lucía's workshop and makes her uncomfortable with her comments. Rafael forbids Roxana to go near Lucía. Gertrudis finds Pedro with Isaura. Diego surprises Claudia at the hospital, she thinks he is following her and slaps him. Michelle changes her mind and wants to work at the club. Lucía decides to give Fernando a chance.
14	"¡Que viva el amor! Lucía y Fernando ya son novios"	30 June 2022	15 July 2022	2.9	1.13
Alejandra has an argument with Pilar and assures her that she almost lost millions of pesos because of her. Gertrudis gets jealous when she sees Isaura with Pedro. Pilar asks Casilda to stop investigating about her mother. Casilda apologizes to Alejandra because she has been selfish. Rafael refuses to be intimate with Roxana and reveals that Lucía is Alejandra's niece. Alejandra makes it clear to Roxana that Lucía is not a prostitute and asks her not to hurt her niece since she will make Rafael put her back on the street. Lucía surprises Fernando in his office. Alfredo is beaten by his workers after he delayed their payments. Casilda impersonates Silvia by sending a sensual photo to Leonardo. Heriberto kidnaps Lucía. Gertrudis asks Heriberto to stay away from Lucía while she threatens him with a gun, Pedro tries to take it away, but she shoots.
15	"Las amigas de Lucía la traicionan"	1 July 2022	18 July 2022	2.7	1.16
Gertrudis shoots Heriberto, Lucía manages to escape. Fernando learns that Heriberto tried to hurt Lucía. Casilda believes that it was Lucía's fault that Heriberto wanted to abuse her. Lucía receives a call from her friend Toña who asks her forgiveness for having betrayed her as she was the one who informed Heriberto that they would be at the cemetery. Alejandra asks Casilda to apologize to Lucía. Rafael asks Gertrudis to get Heriberto out of the business. Paulina puts a stop to her brother, since he won't let her be happy with anyone. Roxana discovers that Lucía is Fernando's new love.
16	"¿Por qué tenías que mentirme?"	4 July 2022	19 July 2022	2.8	1.13
Casilda celebrates that she finally slept with Leonardo. Lucía questions Fernando about his relationship with Roxana. Gertrudis invites Pedro to stay with her. Lucía tells Pilar that Fernando was Roxana's lover. Michelle suffers a crisis after leaving Alejandra's club. Gabino tells Pilar that he already wants to introduce her to his children. Fernando no longer wants Roxana in his life. Gertrudis informs Heriberto that Rafael does not want him out of his business. Fernando reveals to Lucía that he had an open relationship with Roxana, he assures her that Roxana has started to threaten him since he has a complicated relationship with her partner Rafael. Lucía asks Roxana to let her and Fernando be happy.
17	"Una suerte del diablo"	5 July 2022	20 July 2022	2.9	1.12
Alejandra arrives at Roxana's house to ask her to help her with Fernando since she does not want Lucía to be with him. Leonardo discovers that Michelle is Fernando's sister and lets Alejandra know. Isaura enters Casilda's room and learns that she is in love with Leonardo. Rafael receives the photo of Roxana kissing Fernando. Alejandra prevents Manolo from closing her brothel by showing him some photographs of her son dressed as a woman. Rafael informs Alejandra that he is Fernando's business partner and she lets him know that Fernando is Lucía's boyfriend. Alejandra shows Fernando a video of his sister Michelle exposing her double standards. Isaura enters Alejandra's room and steals a necklace. Rafael arrives at Fernando's office and learns that Roxana lent him a large sum of money. Lucía questions Alejandra about her relationship with her mother.
18	"¿Quién era mi mamá?"	6 July 2022	22 July 2022	2.6	0.93
Rafael surprises Roxana in Fernando's office and assures her that she will not be able to invest since he used up all the capital in the company. Carlos gets Paulina to drive a truck again. Alfredo tries to blackmail Gertrudis, but she invites him to do business. Casilda confirms that she will no longer be her godmother's heir. Fernando questions Michelle about her work in a men's club. Alejandra tells Casilda that her mother's name was Sandra and she abandoned her because she was a nuisance to her. Isaura gives her friend the necklace she stole from Alejandra to sell it. Rafael realizes that an associate of Fernando's is falling in love with one of Alejandra's employee. Lucía encourages Casilda to look for her mother. Rafael tries to tell Lucía about his problems with Roxana, but she avoids him. Isaura realizes that the necklace she stole from Alejandra is the same one Alicia has. Lucía wants to exhume her mother's remains because she wants them to be next to her father's, but when she starts the paperwork she realizes that there is no death certificate. Michelle discovers that her brother keeps a gun in his room.
19	"Detener el tiempo"	7 July 2022	25 July 2022	2.6	1.18
Lucía finds out that her mother's death certificate does not exist. Pablo insults Pilar during lunch and Gabino slaps him. Michelle gives Alfredo the money she found in her brother's bedroom. Isaura questions Alejandra about her relationship with Alicia, but she evades her. Juventino extends his help to his sister Gertrudis. Silvia informs Casilda that Leonardo wants to continue sleeping with her. Lucía and Fernando question the reasons why their families oppose their relationship, later, they go out for a swim in the river to consummate their love. Alejandra questions Claudia about her relationship with Diego. Pilar finds out that Leonardo entered the room with one of the girls. Silvia asks Casilda to reveal her identity to Leonardo, but she refuses for fear of losing what she is living.
20	"¡Yo soy tu madre!"	8 July 2022	27 July 2022	2.5	0.99
Lucía discovers that there are no remains in her mother's grave. Casilda reveals to Leonardo that he has actually been sleeping with her and not with Silvia. Juventino informs Alejandra that he could not stop the exhumation of the remains of Lucía's mother. Lucía tells Isaura and Alejandra that there are no remains in her mother's grave, and Isaura notices that Alejandra is nervous. Michelle questions Carlos about the gun she found in his backpack. Diego breaks off working relationship with Fernando. Alejandra demands Isaura to return the necklace she stole from her. Rafael takes advantage of Roxana. When Lucía hears that Alejandra got in between her parents' marriage, she decides to leave the house, Alejandra does not want to lose her again and confesses to Lucía that she is her mother.
21	"No me vuelvas a decir hija"	11 July 2022	28 July 2022	3.0	0.89
Lucía rejects that Alejandra is her mother. Rafael unmasks Roxana's infidelity, she accepts that she had a relationship with Fernando because she felt lonely. Isaura blackmails Alejandra with telling Lucía that she has a brothel if she kicks her out of the house. Rafael rejects Diego's resignation and assures him that he is better for business than Fernando. Lucía tells Pilar that she is hurt by the lie since she was crying to a grave that did not exist. Roxana asks Fernando for the money she lent him since she is separating from Rafael. Rafael seeks Alejandra's help to conquer Lucía, but she refuses and reveals that Lucía is her daughter and will not allow him to get close to her.
22	"Trabajé como prostituta"	12 July 2022	29 July 2022	2.9	0.88
Fernando reveals to Rafael that he was Roxana's lover. Rafael tells Roxana that Fernando has already told him the whole truth. Casilda is sure that Isaura stole her Alejandra's necklace. Michelle tells Paulina that she found a gun and a ski mask in Carlos' room. Alejandra confesses to Lucía that she had to work as a prostitute in order to return to town for her; however, when Jacobo found out what she did for a living, he decided to take her away. Michelle believes that Silvia sent the video to her brother and threatens to reveal her secret at school. Diego tells Claudia that he loves her, but she assures him that nothing can exist since she is a prostitute. Roxana looks for Alejandra to ask her for money, but she refuses. Michelle finds an engagement ring in Alfredo's house and believes it is for her. Casilda takes off her mask in front of Leonardo. Lucía returns to Alejandra's house, but receives a call from Roxana who is willing to reveal her mother's secret. Fernando discovers that his brother betrayed him.
23	"Aceptar lo que soy"	13 July 2022	1 August 2022	2.9	0.92
Carlos accepts that he betrayed Fernando. Casilda proves to Leonardo that he always slept with her. Alfredo gives Michelle the engagement ring, but asks her not to tell anyone. Silvia assures Leonardo that Casilda threatened to fire her if she refused to help her plan. Lucía arrives at Roxana's call accompanied by Alejandra, but when Roxana sees her, she assures Lucía that they need to talk alone. Casilda tries to help Silvia. Alejandra assures Lucía that Roxana only wants to get revenge on her after she didn't give her a loan. Isaura believes that Pedro is going to propose to her. Casilda rips Leonardo's photos knowing that he will never love her. Lucía lets Rafael know that she trusts Fernando completely. Gertrudis asks Heriberto for a divorce. Pablo asks Pilar to stay away from his father. Martha gets Fernando and Carlos to reconcile, he accepts that he made a mistake and turns himself in to the authorities. Lucía asks Michelle to listen to her, but Michelle only blames her for ruining her life. Martha asks Lucía to stay away from Fernando.
24	"Si fuera tú, me querría morir"	14 July 2022	2 August 2022	2.9	1.00
Alejandra informs Rafael that Roxana tried to set her up. Casilda reveals to her godmother that she slept with Leonardo. Rafael wants to be sure that Fernando is not Carlos' accomplice. Alejandra makes Lucía believe that Casilda made an attempt on her life. Gabino looks for Pilar. Isaura learns that Pedro did not pay for her friend's necklace. Martha suffers a nervous breakdown. Alfredo sees Lucía at the hospital, he flirts with her and Fernando punches him when he sees him. Isaura demands Gertrudis to return the necklace, she refuses, Juventino threatens to put Isaura in jail if she continues assaulting his sister. Leonardo apologizes to Casilda. Lucía asks Isaura to tell her the truth about what she did with her father's house. Roxana pays Carlos' bail and he returns home.
25	"Jamás derrames una lágrima por un hombre"	15 July 2022	4 August 2022	2.7	0.88
Isaura assures Lucía that Heriberto forced her father to give him the house in exchange for her freedom, Lucía refuses to believe this version. Martha is willing to pay all of Carlos' bail money to Roxana. Isaura threatens Casilda with betrayal. Fernando despises Roxana since he wants nothing to do with her. Rafael lets Lucía know that Roxana paid Fernando's brother's bail. Gertrudis kicks out Pedro and assures him that she will not be made fun of. Rafael celebrates that his plan is going as he wishes and Roxana assures Rafael that if he wants Lucía so badly, he should stay with her. Gabino asks Pilar not to become Alejandra's accomplice after she stole all of Casilda's fortune. Fernando invites Lucía to his trip to Monterrey. Diego enters the brothel to take Claudia. Isaura finds Casilda's mother's will. Lucía arrives at the hotel and sees Fernando kissing Roxana.
26	"No me busques más"	18 July 2022	5 August 2022	2.9	1.05
Roxana blames Fernando for hitting her. Lucía meets with Rafael and he takes advantage of the moment to sow intrigues against Fernando. Alejandra asks Lucía to be careful with Rafael. Isaura assures Casilda that she will start investigating her mother's life. Rafael reiterates to Roxana that Lucía is not only beautiful but also very intelligent. Alejandra threatens Rafael if he tries to approach Lucía. Fernando believes that Diego is betraying him. Heriberto tries to hurt Gertrudis, but Lucía defends her. Paulina learns that her brother is in love. Fernando tries to give Lucía an explanation, but she rejects him. Carlos makes a pass at Roxana. Lucía informs her family that she is willing to take back her father's house. Paulina is sure that Diego is betraying Fernando and confronts him about his new relationship. Fernando objects to Michelle's engagement. Gabino invites Isaura to spend the night with him. Lucía receives a video that proves what Isaura told her is the truth.
27	"¿Te quieres casar conmigo?"	19 July 2022	8 August 2022	3.0	1.07
Lucía is sure that Gertrudis sent her the video as proof that Heriberto took her father's house. Carlos confronts Alfredo and asks him to keep his word and return his money. Diego complains to Claudia for telling Michelle about their relationship. Fernando looks for Paulina to unburden himself, she confesses that she is in love with him. Claudia denies that she has slept with Rafael. Gabino reveals to Isaura what happened with Casilda's mother. Casilda thinks she is pregnant. Nestor finds out about Michelle's engagement and asks her not to get married. Paulina tells Lucía that she is in love with Fernando, but still pleads for her to forgive him. Roxana gets upset with Carlos and reminds him that he can't walk away from her without first getting Lucía out of his way. Fernando wants to sell his shares. Lucía listens to the audios that Fernando sent her the night she saw him kissing Roxana. Lucía confronts Roxana and warns her that neither she nor anyone else will be able to keep her away from Fernando. Lucía surprises Fernando in his apartment and proposes to him.
28	"Perdimos la guerra"	20 July 2022	9 August 2022	2.5	0.91
After Lucía's proposal, Fernando gives her the engagement ring. Heriberto fears that Lucía will take back her house. Gabino asks Isaura not to mess with Alejandra. Claudia cries over the death of her mother, and Diego wants to pay all funeral expenses. Lucía and Fernando set a date for their wedding, but his family opposes their engagement. Heriberto buys Isaura so that she will not testify against him. Fernando informs Roxana that he is marrying Lucía, Rafael learns of the engagement and assures Roxana that she has one last chance or she will lose everything. Paulina has a strong fight with Diego and decides to leave the house, he informs her that he will also stop working at the company. Pedro asks Isaura not to mess with Gertrudis. Alfredo finds out about Lucía's wedding. Alejandra does not want Lucía to go back to San Jacinto and reiterates that she has everything at home, but Lucía comments that she has never thought of keeping what is hers. Michelle discovers that Alejandra is Lucía's mother.
29	"La muerte de Roxana"	21 July 2022	11 August 2022	3.0	1.09
Alejandra threatens Michelle with disappearing her if she reveals her secret. Lucía witnesses Leonardo's humiliation of Casilda. Lucía thanks Alejandra for being at an important moment for her. Alejandra accepts that Isaura continues living with her. Roxana continues with her lies, but Lucía does not believe her. Lucía confronts Michelle and assures her that the words she dedicated to her during the toast were a lie. Lucía confesses to the judge that Heriberto tried to abuse her. Roxana threatens Carlos with sending him back to jail. Casilda takes a second pregnancy test and confirms that she is expecting Leonardo's child. Fernando arrives at the cabin to give Roxana the money, she asks him to be together for the last time, he gets upset and decides to leave, but a man enters the cabin and shoots Roxana.
30	"¡Boda interrumpida!"	22 July 2022	12 August 2022	2.5	1.06
Gabino asks Pilar for a chance. Casilda begs Isaura not to say anything about her pregnancy to her godmother. Nestor refuses to be with Michelle so that she forgets Alfredo and assures her that he is in love with her. Rafael makes a loan to Diego to pay off Claudia's debt. Diego has an outburst of jealousy with Claudia, Paulina tries to defend her and learns that she is a prostitute. Alejandra gives Lucía a pearl necklace, but when she puts it on it breaks, Toña assures her that it is bad luck. Casilda reveals to Leonardo that she is expecting his child, Alejandra refuses to let the baby be born. Martha asks Alfredo to leave after Fernando's ceremony is over. Isaura assures Leonardo that Casilda is the owner of everything Alejandra has so it is in his best interest to accept the baby. Lucía asks Alejandra to be the one to give her away to Fernando, however, during the wedding, Fernando is arrested for his alleged responsibility in Roxana's murder.
31	"Yo no la maté"	25 July 2022	15 August 2022	2.7	1.06
Rafael calls Fernando a murderer when he sees him. Pilar learns of Casilda's pregnancy. Lucía is convinced that Rafael is taking revenge on Fernando. Rafael tells Diego that during his statement he should emphasize that they were together at work. Lucía complains to Fernando for hiding the fact that he saw Roxana. Rafael toasts with Heriberto that he can finally be with Lucía. Isaura shows Leonardo Sandra's will. Diego informs Rafael that he is worried about Fernando because in the prison where he will be transferred is El Chino, the man who threatened him. Leonardo agrees to accompany Casilda throughout her pregnancy. Fernando tells Lucía what happened the night Roxana died, she reiterates that she trusts him. Casilda and Leonardo hear the heartbeat of their baby for the first time. Rafael meets with El Chino. One of the girls from Alejandra's club gives some drops to Juventino's drink, which cause him to have a heart attack. El Chino threatens Fernando with hurting Lucía.
32	"¡Lucía está embarazada!"	26 July 2022	16 August 2022	2.7	1.04
El Chino proves to Fernando that he can hurt Lucía. Rafael announces to Heriberto that he will be the next municipal president of San Jacinto. Lucía learns that Juventino suffered a heart attack at the gentlemen's club owned by Alejandra. Lucía arrives at Alejandra's brothel and finds out that her mother is the owner. Claudia ends her relationship with Diego. Lucía realizes that Isaura and Casilda betrayed her. Lucía returns to San Jacinto after feeling betrayed by her mother; however, her house burns down and Alfredo saves her from dying. Leonardo asks Casilda for a chance. Lucía learns that she is expecting Fernando's child. Fernando blames himself for Roxana's death and asks Lucía not to look for him anymore, she cannot tell him the news that she is expecting his child.
33	"Gracias por hacerme tu mamá"	27 July 2022	17 August 2022	2.8	0.99
Rafael visits Lucía in her workshop to inform her that Fernando killed Roxana after learning that she was expecting his child. Alejandra does not believe Leonardo's good intentions. Fernando assures Paulina that he broke up with Lucía to protect her. Isaura looks for Rafael to gain his trust. Carlos starts flirting with Claudia. Alejandra learns that Lucía is leaving Puebla to start a new life. Leonardo assures Casilda that he does not want to be with her. Paulina informs Fernando that no one knows about Lucía. Heriberto confesses to Juventino that he planned to murder him. Casilda goes into labor, but the situation becomes complicated and she loses her baby. Lucía becomes a mother of a baby girl, but Isaura plans to take her away her baby so that Rafael can get closer to her.
34	"La bebé está muerta"	28 July 2022	18 August 2022	2.8	0.99
Isaura makes Rafael see that if he keeps Lucía's daughter he will always have Fernando's shadow, Rafael pays to make Lucía believe that her baby did not resist and died. Rafael informs Lucía that her baby died, she suffers a crisis. Alejandra swears to Rafael that she will regret taking her away from Lucía. Alejandra informs Fernando that the baby that Lucía was expecting died at birth, she assures him that she will help him get out of jail. Casilda shows a rejection for her baby, but Isaura assures her that she should be smarter as it could spoil the whole plan. Lucia says her last goodbye to her daughter. Lucia makes an oath to her daughter and seeks Rafael to ask him to be her ally so she can take revenge on all those who have hurt her, in exchange, she is willing to be with him.
35	"El mundo está a mis pies"	29 July 2022	19 August 2022	2.6	1.01
Alfredo confronts Michelle when he discovers that she worked in Alejandra's brothel. Lucía assures Toña that she doesn't trust anyone, but she needs the money and power that Rafael has. Rafael surprises Lucía with some gifts. Diego reveals to Carlos that Claudia is a prostitute. Alejandra seeks to know what Isaura and Leonardo are hiding. Isaura blackmails Alejandra with revealing her secret to Casilda. Fernando cannot believe that Lucía has gone with Rafael to Europe. Lucía assures Rafael that Fernando no longer exists in her life, he asks her for a chance. Alejandra helps Fernando get out of prison. Alejandra visits her granddaughter's grave. Fernando thanks Paulina for always being in his life, she kisses him. Lucía arrives on Rafael's arm for dinner and surprises Gertrudis and Heriberto.
36	"Te voy a hacer pagar"	1 August 2022	22 August 2022	2.6	0.99
Rafael reveals to Gertrudis and Heriberto that Lucía is the investor in their business, so the future is in their hands. Fernando rescues Michelle. Heriberto seeks to conquer Lucía. Michelle reveals to her family that Alfredo has threatened her. Leonardo returns to look for Cassandra. Rafael asks Lucía not to play with him. Michelle tells Nestor that she broke up with Alfredo. Fernando feels a special connection with Valentina, Casilda's daughter. Lucía takes Gertrudis to the cemetery where she warns her that she will take revenge for all the harm she did to her. Rafael and Heriberto fight over Lucía. Nestor reveals to Michelle that he is gay. Isaura asks Casilda to look interested in Valentina, Casilda questions her about what she did with her baby, Alejandra listens to them. Fernando is reunited with Lucía. Alejandra confronts Isaura about Casilda's baby.
37	"No te imaginas cuánto te odio"	2 August 2022	23 August 2022	2.9	0.83
Lucía meets Fernando again at Luz's grave and assures him that she feels disappointed in him. Alejandra, seeing that she has Isaura in her hands, does not hesitate to humiliate her. Gertrudis receives a mysterious gift. Lucía breaks down with Toña when she tells her that she saw Fernando. Michelle forgives Nestor and supports him. Cassandra communicates with Leonardo and he makes a revelation. Alejandra tries to contact her daughter, but Rafael prevents her, Lucía picks up the phone and assures her that she is with the man who treats her like a queen. Diego learns of Paulina's illness and apologizes to her. Lucía manages to get into Heriberto's office. Heriberto proves to Lucía that Alfredo was the one who betrayed her. Casilda discovers that Leonardo is with her out of interest. Alfredo is happy that Lucía has sought him out, but all she wants is to get revenge on him, so she puts a drug in his drink, he begins to feel sick and passes out.
38	"Todo esto es mío"	3 August 2022	24 August 2022	3.0	0.99
Fernando learns of Paulina's diagnosis. Lucía makes it clear that she owns all of Heriberto and Gertrudis' fortune, so now she has them in her hands. Alejandra discovers that Roxana was not pregnant. Alfredo proposes to Heriberto to take revenge on Lucía. Casilda asks Lucía for help to find out what inheritance Leonardo and Isaura are talking about. Gabino reveals to Lucía that Sandra was the owner of a brothel, but after Casilda's birth, she became ill and later died, so she entrusted Alejandra with the business and asked her to take care of her daughter, a promise she did not keep since she took all her fortune. Rafael asks Isaura to find a way for Casilda to take care of his daughter and not Lucía. Casilda complains to Alejandra for what she did to her and threatens to denounce her. Alfredo is arrested. Alejandra involves Casilda with her lies to win back her trust. Gertrudis discovers that a video of her with Pedro was leaked on the internet. Lucía assures Fernando that he had no right to know she was pregnant.
39	"¿Aceptarías casarte conmigo?"	4 August 2022	25 August 2022	3.0	0.96
Alejandra advises Casilda to marry Leonardo to get revenge on him. Gertrudis, feeling attacked, assures that the video is a montage and accuses Heriberto of being an abuser. Fernando learns that Roxana was not pregnant. Lucía begs Casilda not to get married because she is being manipulated by her godmother and asks her not to sign any power of attorney. Fernando warns Rafael that he is going to prove that he is innocent of Roxana's crime. Lucía confirms to Toñita that she leaked the intimate video of Gertrudis and at the same time discovers that Rafael put Heriberto as Municipal President. Michelle asks Alfredo to forget about her forever. Pedro obtains information from Heriberto that Lucía needs. Fernando takes advantage of his family's reunion to ask Paulina to marry him. Casilda refuses to marry Leonardo because he is an interested man, Lucía backs her decision and kicks everyone out of her house.
40	"Yo no soy la mamá de Valentina"	5 August 2022	26 August 2022	3.0	1.08
Isaura, feeling Casilda's rejection, threatens to tell the truth. Juventino reveals that Heriberto wanted to kill him. Alejandra gives the order to throw away all of Isaura's belongings. Heriberto threatens to take revenge on Gertrudis and Juventino. Pilar is willing to help Casilda. Fernando learns that Paulina has little time left to live. Isaura loses all her savings and seeks Rafael to blackmail him into revealing the truth. Lucía learns that Fernando and Paulina are about to get married. Pilar informs Alejandra that she will support Casilda to recover what belongs to her and Alejandra feels betrayed by who she thought was her friend. Fernando assures Lucía that he is going to marry a woman who trusts him. Casilda reveals to Lucía that Valentina is not her daughter.
41	"Me destrozaste la vida"	8 August 2022	29 August 2022	3.1	1.09
Rafael asks Casilda to stop confusing people by saying that Valentina is not her daughter, he promises to help her recover her fortune. Pedro reveals his betrayal to Gertrudis. Heriberto takes revenge against Juventino. Lucía prevents Leonardo from taking Valentina. Rafael threatens Isaura with harm if she dares to say that they were accomplices, he takes away her cell phone where she has information about Casilda's will. Paulina prepares her wedding with Fernando. Casilda authorizes the eviction order against Alejandra. Paulina finds Fernando's diary. Lucía informs her mother that the only thing she is doing is justice. Gertrudis asks Rafael for help to get revenge on Heriberto, so she arrives at the bar where her husband summons Lucía and she shoots him in the heart.
42	"¡Valentina es tu hija!"	9 August 2022	30 August 2022	3.1	1.02
Gertrudis asks Lucía to leave Rafael's house because her life is in danger. Casilda surprises Lucía with her new look. Casilda returns home ready to take possession of what is hers, but is confronted by Alejandra. Lucía discovers that Valentina has the same birth mark as her daughter and Alejandra confirms that Valentina is not Casilda's daughter. Paulina forgives her brother. Paulina gives Fernando's diary to Lucía that reveals his great love for her, which is why she has decided to cancel their wedding, Lucía learns of Paulina's illness. Lucía seeks out Isaura and demands that she tell her the truth, she reveals that Valentina is her daughter.
43	"Te extrañé tanto"	10 August 2022	1 September 2022	3.0	1.18
Rafael seeks to get rid of Casilda and her daughter so he asks Leonardo to conquer her in exchange for a lot of money. Isaura reveals to Lucía that she changed her daughter to save her. Rafael forbids Diego from entering the company. Dominga confesses to Lucía that Isaura was to blame for her father's death and the loss of her house. Casilda tells Leonardo that Valentina is not his daughter since her baby died at birth. Diego and Fernando manage to enter Rafael's office in search of evidence. Alejandra looks for Casilda to ask for a chance and advises her to put the club in order. Isaura receives a gift, but Dominga assures her that it is bad luck. Paulina cancels her engagement to Fernando. Lucía calls Fernando to confess that their daughter is alive and is Valentina, she tells him that Isaura was Rafael's accomplice, and asks for his forgiveness.
44	"Perdiste, mi amor"	11 August 2022	2 September 2022	3.0	1.11
Lucía vows to take revenge on Isaura and Rafael to make them pay for all the harm they did to her. Dominga kicks Isaura out of her house. Fernando announces to his family that his daughter is alive. Lucía asks Rafael for help to catch Isaura so she will pay for what she did to her. Fernando begs Lucía to leave Rafael's house because she is in danger. Paulina's health worsens. Casilda learns that Valentina is Lucía's daughter. Isaura swears to Rafael that she did not say anything to Lucía. Alejandra asks Casilda for forgiveness. Paulina dies in the company of Fernando and Diego. Isaura is in the hands of Rafael's people. Lucía threatens Rafael with a gun and assures him that she already knows the whole truth. Rafael proves that he can hurt Valentina, Lucía agrees to go with him in exchange for saving Valentina.
45	"El motor de mi vida"	12 August 2022	5 September 2022	3.3	1.29
Rafael kidnaps Lucía and warns her that the only way to be free is to escape with him to start a new life. Rafael confesses that he killed Roxana. Fernando learns that the police found the body of a woman in one of Rafael's properties, when they arrive they discover that it is Isaura. Leonardo gives the passports to Rafael so that he can escape with Lucía. Fernando comes to Lucía's rescue, but Rafael puts them in danger, and ends up killing himself. After being wounded by Rafael, Alejandra apologizes to Lucía and dies. Casilda turns the brothel into an exclusive restaurant. Lucía dedicates her success as a businesswoman to her mother and in her honor, she names her new jewelry collection 'Alejandra Madrigal'. Lucia thanks Fernando for making her happy.
