= Amanecer (TV series) =

- Genre: Telenovela
- Based on: Monte Calvario by Delia Fiallo
- Developed by: Pablo Ferrer García-Travesí; Santiago Pineda Aliseda
- Directed by: Eric Morales; Bonnie Cartas; Carlos Alcázar
- Starring: Fernando Colunga; Livia Brito; Daniel Elbittar; Ana Belena
- Theme music composer: Jorge Eduardo Murguía; Mauricio L. Arriaga
- Opening theme: "Quererte Bien" by Pepe Aguilar
- Ending theme: "Amanecer" by La Sonora Santanera con María Fernanda
- Composers: Eduardo Pérez G.; Alfredo Gudiño
- Country of origin: Mexico
- Original language: Spanish
- No. of seasons: 1
- No. of episodes: 80

Production
- Executive producer: Juan Osorio
- Producers: Ignacio Ortíz Castillo; Miriam Osorio Avalos
- Editors: Norma Ramírez Ortiz; Fernando Rodríguez
- Camera setup: Multi-camera
- Production company: TelevisaUnivision

Original release
- Network: Las Estrellas
- Release: 7 July – 24 October 2025

Related
- Te sigo amando (1996); La que no podía amar (2011)

Amanecer (English: Dawn) is a Mexican telenovela produced by Juan Osorio for TelevisaUnivision. It is based on the 1986 telenovela Monte Calvario, itself an adaptation of Delia Fiallo's radionovela La mujer que no podía amar. The series stars Fernando Colunga and Livia Brito. It aired on Las Estrellas from 7 July 2025 to 24 October 2025.

== Plot ==
Leonel Carranza is a landowner whose goodness has been overshadowed by betrayal. After the abandonment of his wife and the tragic death of his daughter in a fire, Leonel seeks revenge. Convinced that Alba Palacios and her family are responsible for the tragedy, he forces her into a loveless marriage. Alba, a woman burdened by family debts, finds herself trapped in this union. However, as their lives intertwine, Leonel and Alba discover that resentment can lead to deeper feelings. The complex relationship intensifies with the arrival of Sebastián Peñalosa, a doctor with dark secrets and a dangerous obsession for Alba. Sebastián shows up at Villa Escarlata to treat the physical and emotional wounds of Leonel and his son, but his true intentions threaten to unleash a war for control of Leonel's plantation and Alba's heart. Adding to this is Atocha, Leonel's manipulative sister, who hatches her own plans to maintain power over the Montoro estate, even if it means eliminating her own brother. In the midst of this whirlwind of deceit and challenges, Leonel discovers the possibility of falling in love again and finding meaning in life.

== Cast ==
=== Main ===
- Fernando Colunga as Leonel Carranza Quintana: the owner of Hacienda Montoro in the town of Villa Escarlata. Leonel is a respected boss and loving father who becomes consumed by his thirst for revenge.
  - David Aguiar as child Leonel
- Livia Brito as Alba Palacios Salvatierra: a teacher who is forced to marry Leonel in order to save her family.
- Daniel Elbittar as Sebastián Peñalosa: a doctor who forms a bond with Alba. Unbeknownst to everyone, Sebastián is a serial killer.
- Ana Belena as Atocha Carranza: Leonel's evil sister who seeks to destroy her own brother and his entire family.
- Blanca Guerra as Covadonga de los Reyes: the ambitious and manipulative grandmother of Alba and Camilo.
- Ernesto Laguardia as Íñigo Tarragona: Leonel's foreman and Atocha's lover and accomplice.
- Patricia Reyes Spíndola as Jovita Iglesias: an elderly patient from a mental hospital who searches for her lost child.
- María Rojo as Prudencia Morales: Leonel's housekeeper who is in love with Doroteo.
- Omar Fierro as Father Benigno Montes: a priest in Villa Escarlata who has a past with Covadonga.
- Julieta Egurrola as Leticia Galván: Sebastián and Fátima's mother who is a psychiatrist.
- Emilio Osorio as Tonatiuh Talavera: Amapola's autistic son who has a close bond with Malú.
- Catherine Siachoque as Amapola Talavera: a witch and veterinarian who is obsessed with Leonel and later forms a hostile rivalry with Alba. Amapola is Tonatiuh's mother and Doroteo's daughter.
- Humberto Elizondo as Justo Montalbán: the chief of police in Villa Escarlata.
- Vanesa Restrepo as Fátima Peñalosa: Sebastián's sister and Joaquín's wife who is a victim of domestic violence.
- Nicola Porcella as Camilo Palacios: Alba's brother and Covadonga's grandson who struggles with personal problems.
- Tiago Correa as Joaquín Franco: a police officer in Villa Escarlata and Fátima's abusive husband.
- Salvador Sánchez as Doroteo Talavera: Amapola's father and Tonatiuh's grandfather who is in love with Prudencia.
- Dante Aguiar as Gustavo Carranza: Leonel and Julia's son and Paulina's brother.
- Valeria Santaella as Malú Tarragona: Tonatiuh's best friend and Íñigo's younger half-sister.
- Concepción Márquez as Trinidad: Covadonga's housekeeper.
- Emilio Bravo as Blas Franco: Fátima and Joaquín's son and Miriam's older brother who is in love with Malú.
- María Espinoza Stransky as Karla Montes: Alba's close friend and Benigno's granddaughter who has a relationship with Camilo.
- Mia Fabri as Paulina Carranza: Leonel and Julia's daughter and Gustavo's sister.
- Regina Ortíz de Pinedo as Miriam Franco: Fátima and Joaquín's daughter and Blas' younger sister.
- Eric del Castillo as Leonardo Carranza: Leonel and Atocha's cruel father.

=== Recurring and guest stars ===
- Iván Arana as Aldo Bocanegra: Leonel's right-hand man who has an affair with Julia.
- Andrea Legarreta as Julia Altamirano: Leonel's legal wife and Gustavo and Paulina's mother who has an affair with Aldo.
- Diego Klein as Gregorio Santillana: Alba's fiancé who was already married to another woman.
- Nacho Ortíz as Salvador "Chavita" Castilla: Íñigo's long-lost son.
- Vanessa López as Santa
- Ana Martín as Juliana Alameda: Julia's mother and Leonel's former mother-in-law.

== Production ==
On 8 November 2024, Juan Osorio announced Amanecer and confirmed Fernando Colunga and Livia Brito in the lead roles. In December 2024, María Rojo joined the cast. On 7 February 2025, Daniel Elbittar was announced as the antagonist of the story. A week later, Catherine Siachoque joined the cast. Filming of the telenovela began on 10 March 2025. On 28 March 2025, Andrea Legarreta joined the cast in a guest role. In August 2025, Ana Martín joined the cast. Filming concluded on 14 August 2025.

== Episodes ==
No.	Title	Original release date	Mexico viewers (millions)
1	"Nadie se va a burlar de mí"	7 July 2025 (Note: Premiered early online through Las Estrellas website on 4 July 2025.)	4.92
2	"El amor no es para nosotros"	8 July 2025	5.19
3	"El rey habrá muerto"	9 July 2025	4.73
4	"Sin ustedes, no hay esperanza"	10 July 2025	4.52
5	"Me das miedo, papá"	11 July 2025	4.44
6	"Un destino de tortura y sufrimiento"	14 July 2025	4.18
7	"No esperes compasión de mí"	15 July 2025	4.63
8	"Los héroes también lloran"	16 July 2025	4.63
9	"No eres hijo de Leonel"	17 July 2025	4.80
10	"No soy un asesino"	18 July 2025	5.00
11	"Un compromiso inquebrantable"	21 July 2025	4.67
12	"El diablo tiene muchas formas"	22 July 2025	4.87
13	"El destino suele ser caprichoso"	23 July 2025	4.49
14	"El tirano en su máxima expresión"	24 July 2025	4.78
15	"Esto es lo que ha cosechado"	25 July 2025	4.34
16	"Estoy acostumbrada a sentir culpa"	28 July 2025	3.97
17	"La paz que tú necesitas"	29 July 2025	4.42
18	"La dulzura de la oscuridad"	30 July 2025	4.77
19	"No puedes volver a salir"	31 July 2025	4.20
20	"Te mueves a la sombra del diablo"	1 August 2025	4.34
21	"Es mejor amante que yo"	4 August 2025	4.24
22	"Papel de esposa"	5 August 2025	4.28
23	"Leonel no sabe lo que le espera"	6 August 2025	4.56
24	"Tengo manos en todo"	7 August 2025	4.37
25	"El diablo finge que no existe"	8 August 2025	4.40
26	"Mi alma también llora"	11 August 2025	4.30
27	"¿Eres tú, hijo mío?"	12 August 2025	4.60
28	"Puedo buscar consuelo en otros brazos"	13 August 2025	4.49
29	"Una limosna de compasión"	14 August 2025	3.95
30	"Dios dispone y el diablo ejecuta"	15 August 2025	3.90
31	"Aquí ni los muertos descansan en paz"	18 August 2025	4.32
32	"La verdad no tiene versión"	19 August 2025	4.40
33	"La fe se escapó de mi ser"	20 August 2025	4.33
34	"Yo soy la nueva patrona"	21 August 2025	4.32
35	"El león contra la hiena"	22 August 2025	4.16
36	"El final de tu camino"	25 August 2025	4.20
37	"El hambre de poder te tiene cegada"	26 August 2025	4.50
38	"Yo seré el nuevo director de la orquesta"	27 August 2025	4.56
39	"Víctimas del mismo enemigo"	28 August 2025	4.74
40	"Al fin se hace justicia"	29 August 2025	4.41
41	"Lograste destrozarnos la vida"	1 September 2025	4.45
42	"Cásense otra vez"	2 September 2025	4.67
43	"No perdamos más el tiempo"	3 September 2025	4.03
44	"Firmaste tu sentencia"	4 September 2025	4.78
45	"Deseo hacerte el amor"	5 September 2025	4.20
46	"Aquí encontrarás tu destino"	8 September 2025	4.20
47	"Estarían mejor sin mí"	9 September 2025	4.43
48	"Una maldición en mi existencia"	10 September 2025	4.22
49	"Aun no puedes matarme"	11 September 2025	4.27
50	"Nunca es tarde para el amor"	12 September 2025	3.78
51	"Te daré a Leonel en charola de plata"	15 September 2025	N/A
52	"¿Para qué romperle el corazón?"	16 September 2025	4.26
53	"Esa mujer no tiene cura"	17 September 2025	4.36
54	"Mi destino es estar rota"	18 September 2025	4.21
55	"Mereces ser feliz"	19 September 2025	4.41
56	"No te quiero volver a ver"	22 September 2025	4.01
57	"Los errores de mi padre"	23 September 2025	4.20
58	"No te voy a soltar más"	24 September 2025	3.37
59	"¿De qué lado estás?"	25 September 2025	4.45
60	"Cuidado con Sebastián"	26 September 2025	4.62
61	"Eres hijo del pecado"	29 September 2025	4.60
62	"No son suficientes tus lamentos"	30 September 2025	4.53
63	"¿Tanta es tu hambre de poder?"	1 October 2025	4.33
64	"Mi hijo es un asesino"	2 October 2025	4.12
65	"Me duele verte sufrir"	3 October 2025	4.30
66	"Nadie me pide explicaciones"	6 October 2025	4.89
67	"Eres una vulgar criminal"	7 October 2025	4.50
68	"El comienzo de tu tortura"	8 October 2025	4.64
69	"La mala suerte se riega"	9 October 2025	4.82
70	"El sol siempre vuelve a salir"	10 October 2025	4.75
71	"Tu vida está en mis manos"	13 October 2025	4.79
72	"Para el amor no hay edad"	14 October 2025	5.10
73	"El camino a la redención"	15 October 2025	4.41
74	"¿Dónde está mi hijo?"	16 October 2025	4.63
75	"Este reloj está en tu contra"	17 October 2025	3.84
76	"Yo nací para tener el poder"	20 October 2025	4.70
77	"Llegó el momento de nuestra venganza"	21 October 2025	4.07
78	"Me llevaré a mi nieto"	22 October 2025	4.25
79	"Atando cabos sueltos"	23 October 2025	4.65
80	"Nos aferramos al amor"	24 October 2025	N/A

== Reception ==
=== Ratings ===
Viewership and ratings per season of Amanecer
Season	Timeslot (CT)	Episodes	First aired		Last aired		Avg. viewers (millions)
Season	Timeslot (CT)	Episodes	Date	Viewers (millions)	Date	Viewers (millions)	Avg. viewers (millions)
1	Mon–Fri 9:30 p.m.	78	7 July 2025	4.92	24 October 2025	TBD	4.43

=== Awards and nominations ===
Year	Award	Category	Nominated	Result	Ref
2025	Premios Juventud	My Favorite Actor	Fernando Colunga	Nominated	
2025	Premios Juventud	My Favorite Actress	Livia Brito	Nominated	
