= Cautiva por amor =

- Genre: Telenovela
- Created by: Cecilia Guerty; Pablo Junovich
- Written by: Denisse Quintero; Gabriela Rodríguez
- Directed by: Walter Doehner; Rodrigo Curiel
- Starring: Litzy; Daniela Castro; Plutarco Haza; Osvaldo de León
- Theme music composer: José Alejandro Sánchez Cruz
- Opening theme: "Cautiva por amor" by Litzy
- Composers: José Alejandro Sánchez Cruz; Francisco Javier Pérez Rivas; Mariano Ríos
- Country of origin: Mexico
- Original language: Spanish
- No. of seasons: 1
- No. of episodes: 70

Production
- Executive producer: Luis Urquiza
- Producer: Dinorah Patiño
- Editor: Horacio Valle
- Production company: TV Azteca

Original release
- Network: Azteca Uno
- Release: 12 May – 15 August 2025

Cautiva por amor is a Mexican telenovela produced by TV Azteca. It stars Litzy, Osvaldo de León, Daniela Castro and Plutarco Haza. It aired on Azteca Uno from 12 May 2025 to 15 August 2025.

== Plot ==
Jazmín Palacios was kidnapped by Remigio Fuentes Mansilla, a landowning politician who kept her as a slave in a human trafficking ring run by himself and perfected by his wife Isabel Fuentes Mancilla. During her kidnapping, Jazmín was raped by Remigio and he tried to kill her and her baby. 12 years later, Jazmín returns to the Fuentes Mansilla ranch to make Fernando, Remigio's son, fall in love with her and take revenge on the man who destroyed her life. What Jazmin does not imagine is that fate will lead her to meet her true love, Santiago, an undercover policeman posing as a farmhand.

== Cast ==
- Litzy as Jazmín Palacios
- Daniela Castro as Isabel Fuentes Mansilla
- Plutarco Haza as Remigio Fuentes Mansilla
- Osvaldo de León as Santiago Caletec
- Erick Chapa as Fernando Fuentes Mansilla
- Cayetano Arámburo as Javier Fuentes Mansilla
- Alejandra Lazcano as Melina
- Danka Castro as Valeria Fuentes Mansilla
- Ana Paula del Moral as Alma
- Marco Treviño as Father Gregorio
- Rossana Nájera as Mariángeles
- Andrea de Alba as Shaki
- Celia Marcué as Bernarda
- Yeimy Gallardo as Lina
- Pierre Louis as Neneco
- Eduardo Reza as Romero
- Esteban Soberantes as Peralta
- Luis Yeverino as Pinedo
- Roberto Uscanga as Sánchez Guerrero
- Javier Escobar as Calixto
- Hugo Villalvazo as Quico
- Mariana Vera as Tita
- Saúl Eiyer as Eulalio
- Rami Ramírez as José
- Sahit Sosa as Juan Diego
- Samantha Orozco as Eliana
- Luis Gerardo León as Magistrate
- Alberto Trujillo as Durán
- Antonio López Torres as Bernardo
- Guadalupe Rammath as Aurelia
- Miguel Gutierrez as Rafita
- Víctor Vargas as Muelas
- Juan Joel Guapo as Felipe
- Luis Cuervo as Manotas
- Javier Díaz Dueñas
- Santiago Cachero

== Production ==
On 23 January 2024, TV Azteca announced La cautiva at the Content Americas event, marking the company's return to the production of telenovelas. On 15 May 2024, Litzy, Osvaldo de León, Daniela Castro and Plutarco Haza were announced in the main roles. On 31 May 2024, it was announced that the title of the telenovela had changed to Cautiva por amor. Filming began on 19 June 2024.

== Episodes ==
No.	Title	Original release date	Mexico viewers (millions)
1	"Jazmín Palacios regresa para tomar venganza"	12 May 2025	1.67
2	"Remigio busca al culpable del atentado"	13 May 2025	1.38
3	"Santiago consuela a Jazmín"	14 May 2025	1.21
4	"Fernando y Mariángeles ceden ante la pasión"	15 May 2025	1.27
5	"Remigio se accidenta en el bosque"	16 May 2025	1.30
6	"Remigio entrega una nueva pista para Jazmín"	19 May 2025	1.43
7	"Santiago frustra los planos de Javier y Remigio"	20 May 2025	1.42
8	"Jazmín da un golpe certero contra Remigio"	21 May 2025	1.36
9	"Jazmín reconoce a un aliado en la hacienda"	22 May 2025	1.21
10	"Fernando y Mariángeles se rinden ante la pasión"	23 May 2025	1.42
11	"Santiago levanta las sospechas de Remigio"	26 May 2025	1.35
12	"Jazmín y Fernando deben dejar la hacienda"	27 May 2025	1.48
13	"Fernando sospecha de Jazmín y Santiago"	28 May 2025	1.42
14	"Santiago se confiesa con Jazmín"	29 May 2025	1.36
15	"Remigio muestra su verdadero rostro"	30 May 2025	1.27
16	"Remigio se encarga de Sofía"	2 June 2025	1.32
17	"Remigio compra la libertad de Valeria"	3 June 2025	1.11
18	"Crece la pasión entre Jazmín y Santiago"	4 June 2025	1.16
19	"Jazmín sigue una pista para dar con los cautivos"	5 June 2025	1.38
20	"Jazmín descubre la verdad de Santiago"	6 June 2025	1.51
21	"Isabel paga por la tranquilidad de Valeria"	9 June 2025	1.31
22	"Isabel se ve a escondidas con Barraza"	10 June 2025	1.36
23	"Preparan a Shaki para salir del país"	11 June 2025	1.47
24	"Jazmín le cuenta su verdad a Santiago"	12 June 2025	1.28
25	"Jazmín se entera qué le sucedió a Dana"	13 June 2025	1.73
26	"Jazmín tiene un nuevo motivo para seguir"	16 June 2025	1.19
27	"Santiago consigue pistas importantes sobre Dana"	17 June 2025	1.59
28	"Valeria descubre lo de Jazmín y Santiago"	18 June 2025	1.34
29	"Jazmín descubre quién es su hija"	19 June 2025	1.43
30	"Se frustra la venta de Shaki y Jazmín huye con Alma"	20 June 2025	1.49
31	"Jazmín pone en riesgo su identidad ante Remigio"	23 June 2025	1.43
32	"Shaki logra escapar de sus captores"	24 June 2025	1.26
33	"Remigio da órdenes para investigar a Jazmín"	25 June 2025	1.40
34	"Jazmín festeja el cumpleaños de Dana"	26 June 2025	1.42
35	"Jazmín desenmascara a Melina"	27 June 2025	1.24
36	"Melina, Javier y Alma se alejan de Jazmín"	30 June 2025	1.33
37	"Valeria e Isabel descubren que están en quiebra"	1 July 2025	1.33
38	"Mariángeles está embarazada de Fernando"	2 July 2025	1.39
39	"Silvio Ortega cambia de identidad y corteja a Valeria"	3 July 2025	1.34
40	"Alma escucha que no es hija de Melina"	4 July 2025	1.04
41	"Santiago enfrenta a Ortega por Neneco"	7 July 2025	1.31
42	"Remigio y Javier caen en la trampa de Ortega"	8 July 2025	1.23
43	"Los Fuentes Mansilla se encargan de Javier y de Barraza"	9 July 2025	1.23
44	"Ortega advierte a Valeria sobre los negocios de Remigio"	10 July 2025	1.27
45	"Jazmín se abre al amor de Santiago"	11 July 2025	1.37
46	"Valeria y Fernando dudan del origen de Alma"	14 July 2025	1.30
47	"Juan Diego paga por las malas compañías"	15 July 2025	1.33
48	"Remigio se muestra tal cual es y amenaza a Jazmín"	16 July 2025	1.45
49	"Melina recibe la prueba de ADN y Jazmín le reclama a Santiago"	17 July 2025	1.28
50	"Santiago se accidenta tratando de rescatar a Alma"	18 July 2025	1.43
51	"La vida de Santiago está en peligro"	21 July 2025	1.24
52	"Remigio sospecha que Eliana Pardo está viva"	22 July 2025	1.27
53	"Eliana Pardo le envía un perturbador mensaje a Remigio"	23 July 2025	1.22
54	"Valeria y Fernando ya investigan sobre el negocio familiar"	24 July 2025	1.40
55	"Eliana Pardo denuncia ante las autoridades a Remigio Fuentes Mansilla"	25 July 2025	1.32
56	"Romero entra a la hacienda Fuentes Mansilla con una orden de cateo"	28 July 2025	1.25
57	"Alma resiente que Jazmín le haya mentido sobre su identidad"	29 July 2025	1.42
58	"Shaki y el resto de los cautivos quedan liberados de la red de Remigio"	30 July 2025	1.45
59	"Jazmín es arrestada y Valeria se convierte en testigo protegido"	31 July 2025	1.16
60	"Valeria paga las consecuencias de las fechorías de Javier y Remigio"	1 August 2025	1.36
61	"Valeria se despide para siempre de Jazmín y los Fuentes Mansilla"	4 August 2025	1.42
62	"Isabel escucha el testimonio de Shaki y descubre que Santiago es policía"	5 August 2025	1.24
63	"Beto acude al hospital para conocer a Fernando y se encuentra con Remigio"	6 August 2025	1.20
64	"Jazmín reconoce a Calixto cuando intenta hacerle daño al padre Gregorio"	7 August 2025	1.18
65	"Honrando la memoria de Valeria, Isabel se alía con Santiago"	8 August 2025	1.30
66	"Jazmín obtiene la custodia de Alma, quien le exige respuestas"	11 August 2025	1.50
67	"Javier hiere a Isabel y Remigio secuestra a Jazmín"	12 August 2025	1.49
68	"Los cercanos a Jazmín, Santiago y Romero, hacen todo por rescatarla"	13 August 2025	1.23
69	"Con la crucial ayuda de Beto, Jazmín es liberada"	14 August 2025	1.47
70	"Gran final"	15 August 2025	1.58

== Reception ==
=== Ratings ===
Viewership and ratings per season of Cautiva por amor
Season	Timeslot (CT)	Episodes	First aired		Last aired		Avg. viewers (millions)
Season	Timeslot (CT)	Episodes	Date	Viewers (millions)	Date	Viewers (millions)	Avg. viewers (millions)
1	Mon–Fri 9:30 p.m.	70	12 May 2025	1.67	15 August 2025	1.58	1.35

=== Awards and nominations ===
Year	Award	Category	Nominated	Result	Ref
2025	Produ Awards	Best Romantic Telenovela	Cautiva por amor	Pending	
2025	Produ Awards	Best Lead Actor - Romantic Telenovela	Osvaldo de León	Pending	
