= Osvaldo de León =

American actor (born 1984)

- Born: 6 May 1984 (age 42); Brownsville, Texas, U.S.
- Occupation: Actor
- Years active: 2005–present
- Height: 1.73 m (5 ft 8 in)
- Partners: Cecilia Suárez (2009–2010); Victoria Camacho (2016–present)
- Children: 3

Osvaldo de León (born May 6, 1984) is an American actor and model. He debuted on television in 2007 in the Mexican telenovela Palabra de Mujer, playing Ariel Castellanos. Osvaldo has participated in several plays and Mexican movies, and since its inception with Televisa has participated in several soap operas such as Juro que te amo, Niña de mi Corazón, Una familia con suerte, Lo que la vida me robó, La Malquerida and Sueño de amor and La candidata

== Biography ==
Born in Brownsville, Texas, United States and grew up in Matamoros, Tamaulipas. He left his hometown to begin his acting studies in Mexico City at the Centro de Educación Artística (CEA). He took several courses at Casa Azul such as 'Hacer el humor' and 'Creación de personaje con imaginación', just to name a few.

Professionally, he has participated in theater in plays such as, O´Neill's 'Ah, Wilderness' (2007), 'Escenas de Amor Shakespeare' (2007), 'Our Town´ by Thorton Wilder' (2006), Shakespeare's 'A Midsummer Night's Dream' (2005) and 'Othello' (2009) in which he played 'Casio,' a role for which he won the award for Best APT Co-Actor and also ´The Tempest´(2011) beside actors like Ignacio Lopez Tarso. Months later he was for a short time in the staging of 'Sicario', directed by Felipe Fernandez del Paso..

In film he was cast in the movie 'La noche de las Flores' (2009), directed by Adrian Burns. In 2012 he played Tobías in the film Hidden Moon, directed by José Bojorquez.

On television has taken several projects like the telenovelas Juro que te amo (2008) and Palabra de Mujer, among others. He also made a participation in the series Locas de Amor. In 2010, he played the role of Juan Vicente in the telenovela Niña de mi Corazón, which was produced by Pedro Damián. He played the role of Tomás Campos in the telenovela Una Familia con Suerte. As of 2025, he is filming the new Mexican telenovela Cautiva de Amor.

== Personal life ==
His son Teo, from his previous relationship with Cecilia Suárez, was born in April 2010. Ιn December 2011, he started a relationship with Cassandra Sanchez Navarro, which ended in May 2012. He has twin daughters born in 2016 with Victoria Camacho.

== Filmography ==
=== Film ===
Year	Title	Role	Notes
2012	Hidden Moon	Tobías	Debut film
2013	Milagro en Praga	Steward	
2014	Cambio de ruta	Cristóbal	
2014	Alicia en el país de María	Hombre en el Bar	
2014	Legends	Miguel	
2014	Visitantes	Padre	
2015	Por mis bigotes	Narciso	
2016	La Habitación	Raúl	

=== Television roles ===
Year	Title	Role	Notes
2001	Lo que callamos las mujeres	Diego / Actor	7 episodes
2004	La vida es una canción	Actor	2 episodes
2005	Top Models	Emiliano	
2007–2008	Palabra de mujer	Ariel Castellanos	
2008	Juro que te amo	Rodrigo Charolet	
2010	Niña de mi corazón	Juan Vicente	84 episodes
2010	Locas de amor	Luis	Episode: "Adiós temporal"
2011–2012	Una familia con suerte	Tomás Campos	Recurring role
2013	Mentir para vivir	Leonardo Olvera de la Garza	Recurring role; 54 episodes
2013	Lo que la vida me robó	Sebastián de Icaza	Episode: "Benjamín agoniza"
2014	La malquerida	Germán Palacios	Main cast; 112 episodes
2015	Lo imperdonable	Daniel Fernandez	Supporting role; 90 episodes
2016	Sueño de amor	Erasmo	Main cast; 132 episodes
2017	Érase una vez	Daniel Torres	Episode: "El Gato con Botas"
2017–2018	Sin tu mirada	Luis Alberto	Lead role
2019	Cuna de lobos	Luis Guzman	Main cast
2019-2020	Médicos	Sergio Avila	Recurring role
2021	100 días para enamorarnos	Sebastián del Valle	Recurring role
2021	Diseñando tu amor	Héctor	Main role
2023	Perdona nuestros pecados	Gerardo Montero	Main cast
2023	Minas de pasión	Leonardo Santamaría	Main role
2025	Cautiva por amor	Santiago Caletec	Main role
2025	Velvet: El nuevo imperio	Mateo Andrade	

== Awards and nominations ==
Year	Award	Category	Telenovela	Result
2009	TVyNovelas Awards	Best Male Revelation	A Woman's Word	Nominated
2010	Award APT	Best Co-Star Actor For Theatre	Othelo	Won
2012	TVyNovelas Awards	Best Young Lead Actor	Una Familia con Suerte	Won
2013	Silver Goddesses Awards	Best Male Revelation	Hidden moon	Nominated
2013	Bravo Awards	Best Actor Of The Year	Hidden moon	Won
	TVyNovelas Awards	Best Co-star Actor	Lo Imperdonable	Nominated
