= 38th TVyNovelas Awards =

2020 Mexican TV awards

- Date: October 31, 2020
- Location: Mazatlán, Sinaloa
- Hosted by: Michelle Rodríguez; Jorge van Rankin

Highlights
- Most awards: La usurpadora (7)
- Most nominations: Vencer el miedo (13)

Television/radio coverage
- Network: Las Estrellas

The 38th TVyNovelas Awards is an academy of special awards to the best of telenovelas and TV series. The awards ceremony took place on October 31, 2020. The ceremony was televised in Mexico on Las Estrellas. Michelle Rodríguez and Jorge van Rankin hosted the ceremony. The finalists were announced on March 13, 2020. The first winners were also announced on March 13, 2020.

The ceremony was originally to take place on March 29, 2020. Omar Chaparro was originally set to host. However, on March 13, the ceremony was postponed to a future date due to public health concerns regarding the international coronavirus pandemic.

La usurpadora won 7 awards, the most for the evening including Best Telenovela of the Year. Among other winners are Vencer el miedo who won 4 awards, Ringo and Médicos won one award each.

== Summary of awards and nominations ==
Telenovela	Nominations	Awards
Vencer el miedo	13	4
Ringo	12	1
La usurpadora	11	7
Cuna de lobos	8	0
Cita a ciegas	7	0
Médicos	6	1
La reina soy yo	5	0
Por amar sin ley	3	0
Soltero con hijas	3	0
El corazón nunca se equivoca	1	0

== Awards and nominees ==
Winners are listed first, highlighted in boldface.

=== Telenovelas ===
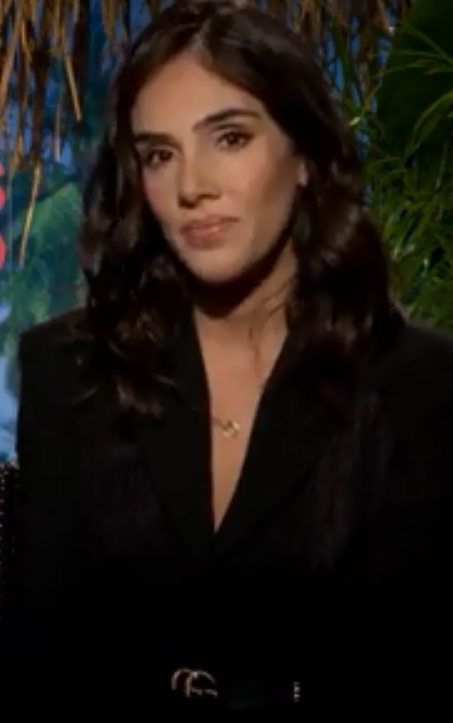
Sandra Echeverría, Best Actress and Best Antagonist Actress winner.

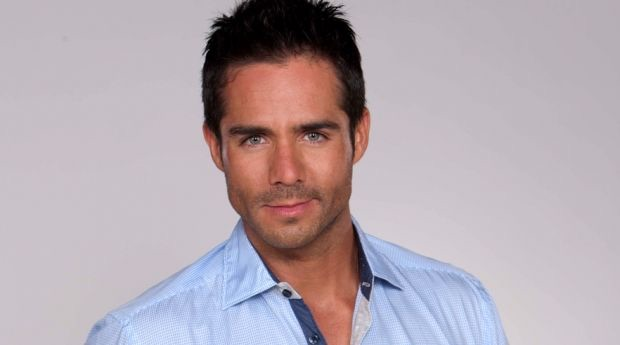
José Ron, Best Actor winner.

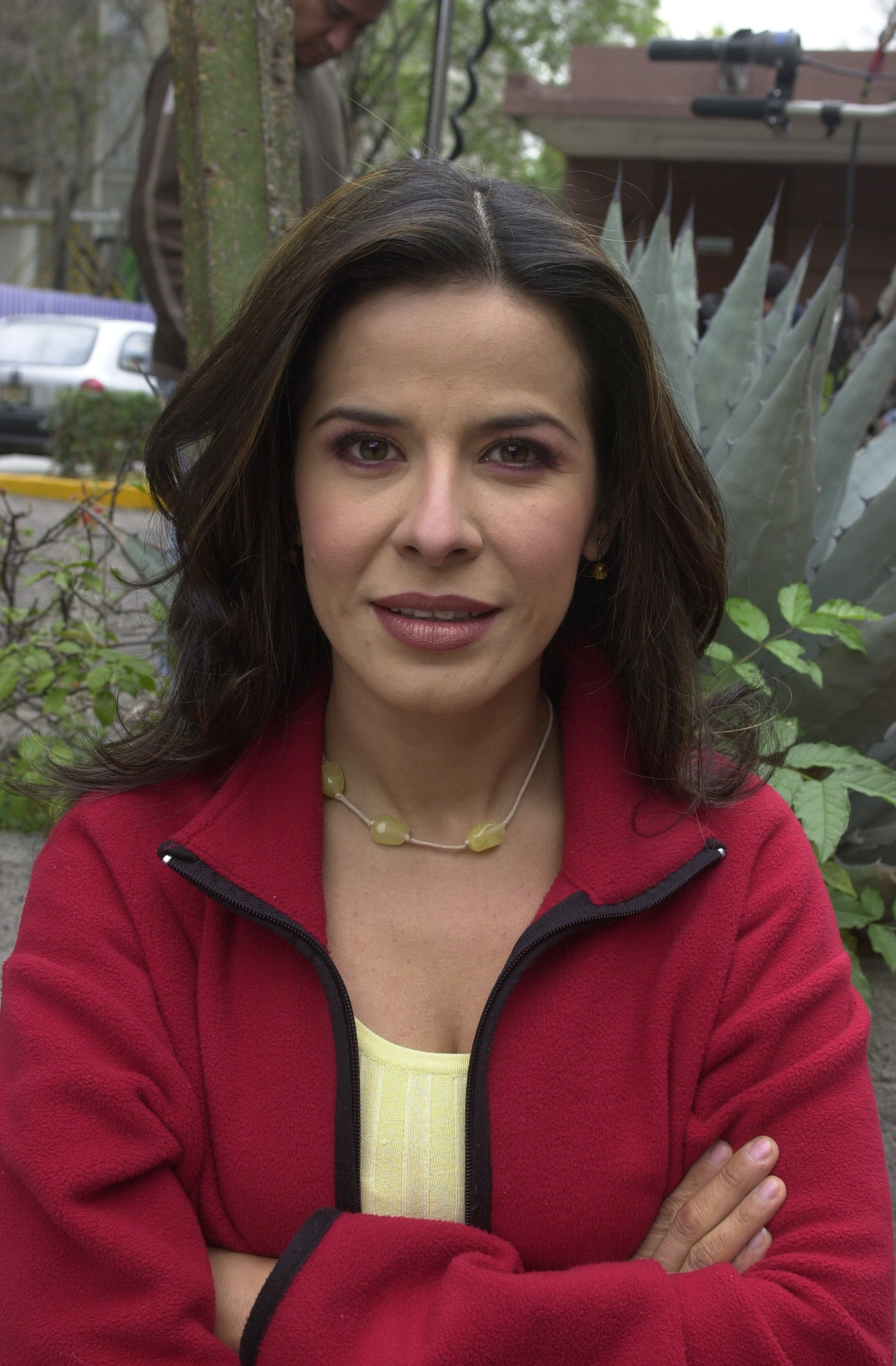
Arcelia Ramírez, Best Leading Actress winner.

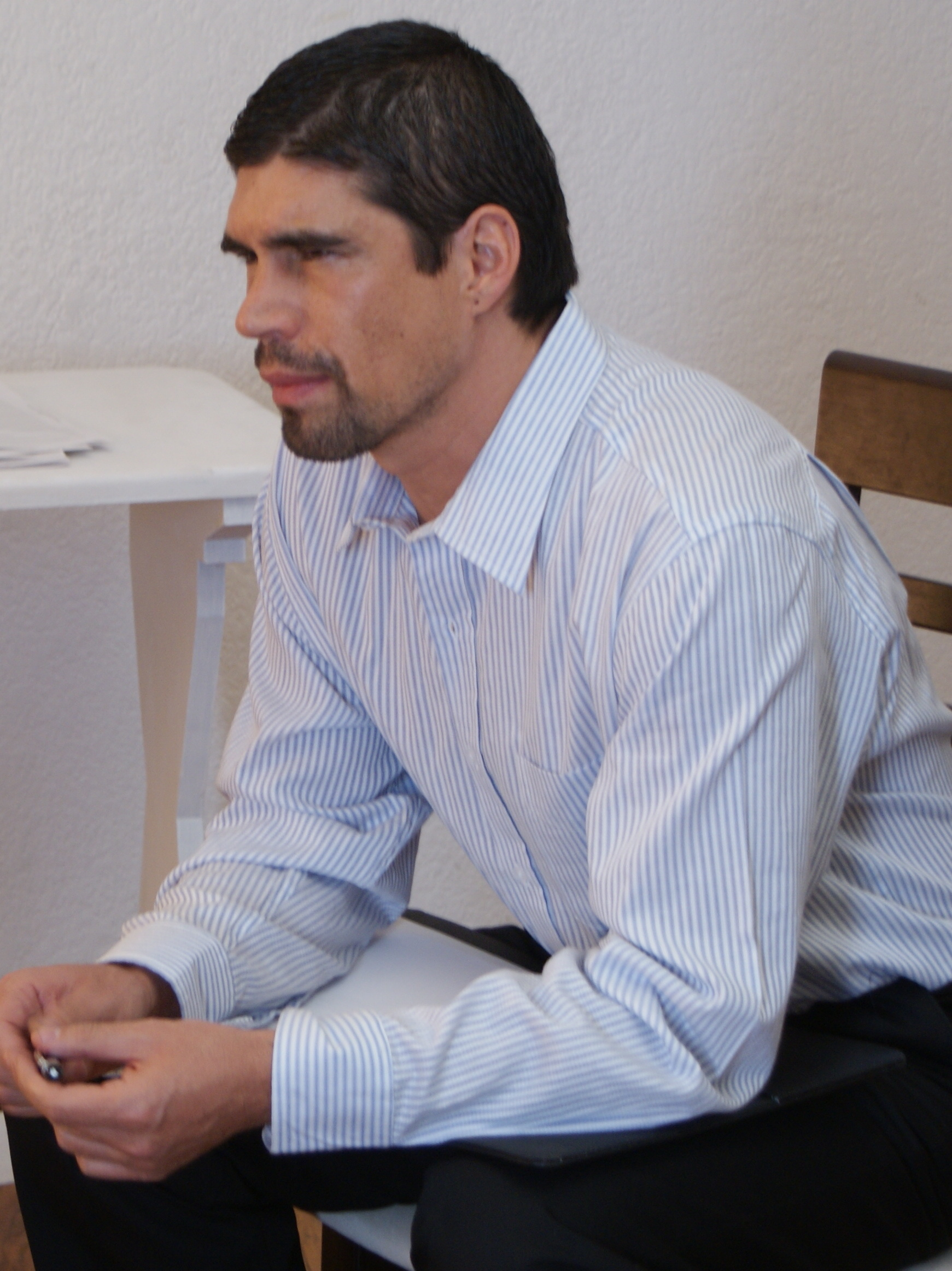
Alberto Estrella, Best Leading Actor winner.

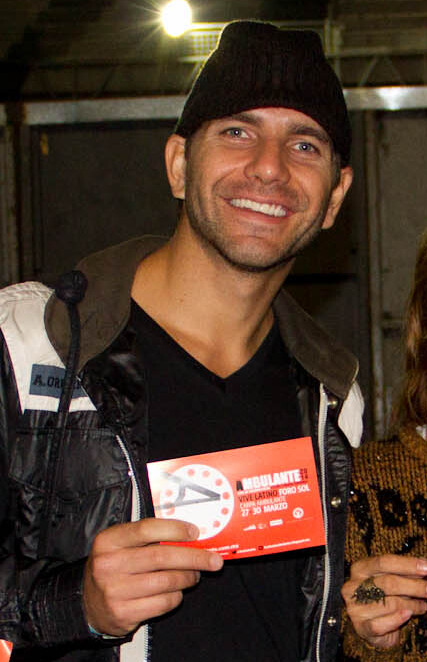
Arap Bethke, Best Co-lead Actor winner.

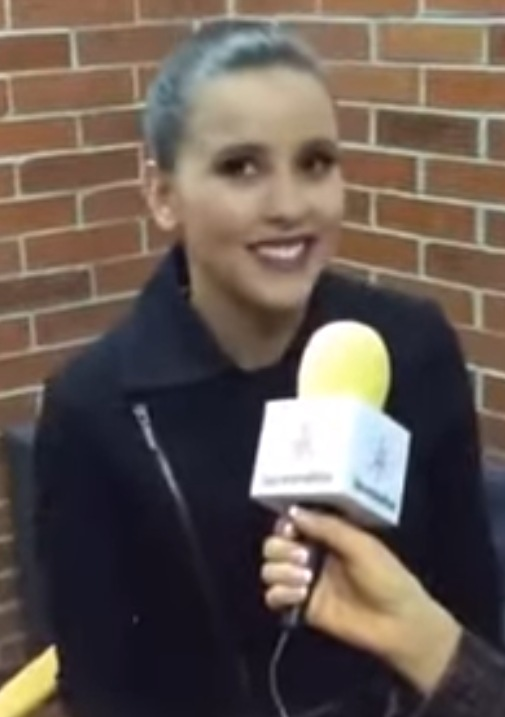
Paulina Goto, Best Musical Theme winner.

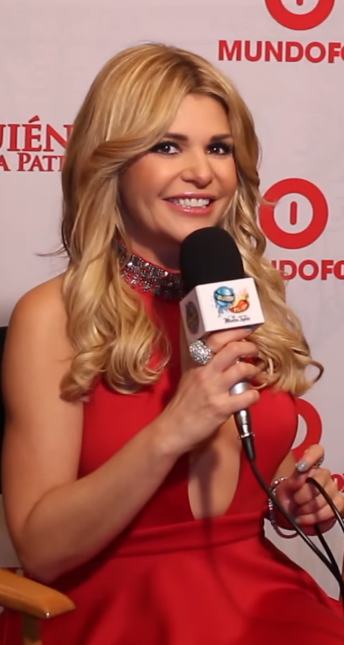
Itatí Cantoral, Best Actress in a Drama Series winner.

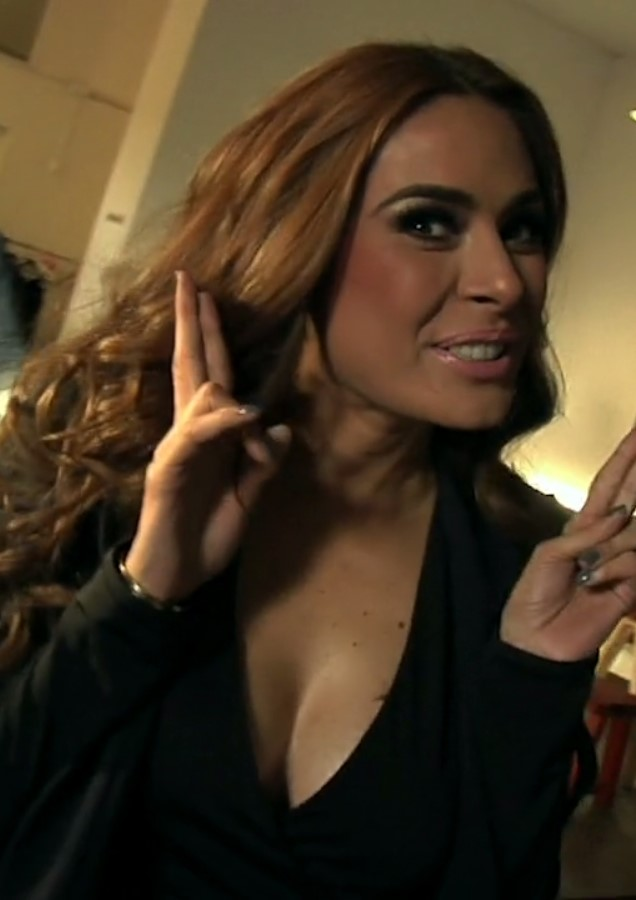
Galilea Montijo, Best Female Host winner.

Best Telenovela of the Year	Best Original Story or Adaptation
**La usurpadora - Carmen Armendáriz**; Médicos - José Alberto Castro; Por amar sin ley - José Alberto Castro; Ringo - Lucero Suárez; Soltero con hijas - Juan Osorio; Vencer el miedo - Rosy Ocampo	**Larissa Andrade, Tania Tinajero, Zaria Abreu, and Fernando Abrego** - **La usurpadora**; Andrés Burgos - Cita a ciegas; Vanesa Varela, Fernando Garcilita, and José Alberto Castro - Por amar sin ley; Carmen Sepúlveda, Lucero Suárez, Maykel Ponjuán, and Luis Reynoso - Ringo; Pedro Rodríguez, Claudia Velazco, Humberto Robles, Alejandra Romero, Gerardo Zermeño, and Gustavo Bracco - Vencer el miedo
Best Actress	Best Actor
**Sandra Echeverría - La usurpadora**; Mariana Torres - Ringo; Michelle Renaud - La reina soy yo; Paulina Goto - Vencer el miedo; Sofía Garza - Cita a ciegas; Vanessa Guzmán - Soltero con hijas	**José Ron - Ringo**; Andrés Palacios - La usurpadora; Danilo Carrera - Vencer el miedo; Flavio Medina - Cuna de lobos; Gabriel Soto - Soltero con hijas; Lambda García - La reina soy yo
Best Antagonist Actress	Best Antagonist Actor
**Sandra Echeverría - La usurpadora**; Gloria Stalina - La reina soy yo; Luz Edith Rojas - Ringo; Nicole Vale - Vencer el miedo; Nailea Norvind - Cuna de lobos	**Rodrigo Murray - Médicos**; Diego Amozurrutia - Cuna de lobos; Emmanuel Palomares - Vencer el miedo; Jorge Poza - Ringo; Sergio Sendel - El corazón nunca se equivoca
Best Leading Actress	Best Leading Actor
**Arcelia Ramírez - Vencer el miedo**; Azela Robinson - Cuna de lobos; Queta Lavat - La usurpadora; Silvia Mariscal - Ringo; Victoria Ruffo - Cita a ciegas	**Alberto Estrella - Vencer el miedo**; César Évora - Ringo; Guillermo García Cantú - Por amar sin ley; José Elías Moreno Jr. - Médicos; Juan Carlos Barreto - La usurpadora
Best Co-lead Actress	Best Co-lead Actor
**Jade Fraser - Vencer el miedo**; Ana Bertha Espín - La usurpadora; Grettell Valdez - Médicos; Luz Ramos - Ringo; Paulette Hernández - Cuna de lobos	**Arap Bethke - La usurpadora**; Axel Ricco - Vencer el miedo; Carlos de la Mota - Médicos; Omar Fierro - Cita a ciegas; Polo Morín - La reina soy yo
Best Direction	Best Direction of the Cameras
**Francisco Franco Alba** - **La usurpadora**; Juan Carlos Muñoz and Rodrigo Curiel - Cita a ciegas; Eric Morales and Juan Pablo Blanco - Cuna de lobos; Claudia Elisa Aguilar and Jorge Robles - Ringo; Benjamín Cann and Fernando Nesme - Vencer el miedo	**Vivián Sánchez Ross** - **La usurpadora**; Daniel Ferrer and Alfonso Mendoza - Cita a ciegas; Armando Zafra and Luis Rodríguez - Cuna de lobos; Bernardo Nájera - Médicos; Víctor Soto and Adrián Frutos - Ringo; Manuel Barajas, Alejandro Frutos, and Diego Tenorio - Vencer el miedo
Best Musical Theme
**"Rompe"** - Paulina Goto - **Vencer el miedo**; "Así como soy" - Sofía Garza and Viviana Barrera - Cita a ciegas; "Cuna de lobos" - Pedro Plascencia - Cuna de lobos; "Depredador" - Gelo Arango - La reina soy yo; "Tú conmigo" - Yahir - Ringo

=== Others ===
Best Drama Series	Best Comedy Series
**Silvia Pinal, frente a ti - Carla Estrada**; Los elegidos - Andrés Santamaría; Sin miedo a la verdad - Rubén Galindo	**Nosotros los guapos - Guillermo del Bosque**; La parodia - Reynaldo López; Simón dice - Pedro Ortiz de Pinedo; Una familia de diez - Pedro Ortiz de Pinedo; Vecinos - Elías Solorio
Best Actress in a Drama Series	Best Actor in a Drama Series
**Itatí Cantoral - Silvia Pinal, frente a ti**; Macarena García - Los elegidos; Ligia Uriarte - Sin miedo a la verdad	**Alex Perea - Sin miedo a la verdad**; Carlos Ferro - Los elegidos; Gonzalo Guzmán - Silvia Pinal, frente a ti
Best Actress in a Comedy Series	Best Actor in a Comedy Series
**Macaria - Vecinos**; Bárbara Torres - Lorenza; Mayrin Villanueva - Vecinos; Regina Blandón - Renta congelada; Yekaterina Kiev - La parodia	**Ariel Miramontes - Nosotros los guapos**; Adrián Uribe - Nosotros los guapos; Cristian Ahumada - La parodia; Eduardo España - Vecinos; Jorge Ortiz de Pinedo - Una familia de diez
Best Female Host	Best Male Host
**Galilea Montijo - Pequeños Gigantes**; Andrea Legarreta - Hoy; Cynthia Urías - Cuéntamelo ya; Odalys Ramírez - Cuéntamelo ya; Roxana Castellanos - Cuéntamelo ya	**Faisy - Me caigo de risa**; Adrián Uribe - 100 mexicanos dijieron; Diego de Erice - Inseparables; Omar Chaparro - ¿Quién es la máscara?; Raúl Araiza - Hoy
Best Unit Program	Best Reality
**La rosa de Guadalupe - Miguel Ángel Herros**; Como dice el dicho - Genoveva Martínez; Esta historia me suena - Genoveva Martínez	**¿Quién es la máscara? - Miguel Ángel Fox**; 100 mexicanos dijieron - Guillermo del Bosque; Inseparables - Pablo Calasso; Pequeños Gigantes - Rubén Galindo
Best Entertainment Program	Best Program of Pay Television
**Me caigo de risa - Eduardo Suárez**; Cuéntamelo ya - Nino Canún; Hoy - Magda Rodríguez; Más noche - Israel Jaitovich	**Netas divinas - Miguel Ángel Fox**; Con permiso - Yordi Rosado; Consecuencias - Raquel Rocha; Miembros al aire - Eduardo Suárez; Terapia de shock - Raquel Rocha

=== Favoritos del público ===
"Favoritos del publico" are categories that the public votes for through the official website of the awards. The awards were presented by Erika Buenfil and Alexis Ayala.

The Most Handsome Guy	The Most Beautiful Woman
Daniel Arenas - Médicos	Ale Müller - El corazón nunca se equivoca
The Most Handsome Villain	The Most Beautiful Villain
Sergio Sendel - El corazón nunca se equivoca	Grettell Valdez - Médicos
Favorite Couple	The Most Beautiful Smile
Emilio Osorio and Joaquín Bondoni - El corazón nunca se equivoca	Livia Brito - Médicos
The Most Delicious Kiss	Slap of the Year
Emilio Osorio and Joaquín Bondoni - El corazón nunca se equivoca	Sergio Sendel and Laura Flores - El corazón nunca se equivoca
The Most Handsome Senior	Star Inflencer
César Évora - Ringo	Paulina Goto
Best Finale	Best Cast
El corazón nunca se equivoca - Juan Osorio	El corazón nunca se equivoca - Juan Osorio
Musical Release of the Year
Gerardo Díaz y su Gerarquía
