= Anabel Gutiérrez =

Mexican actress (1931–2022)

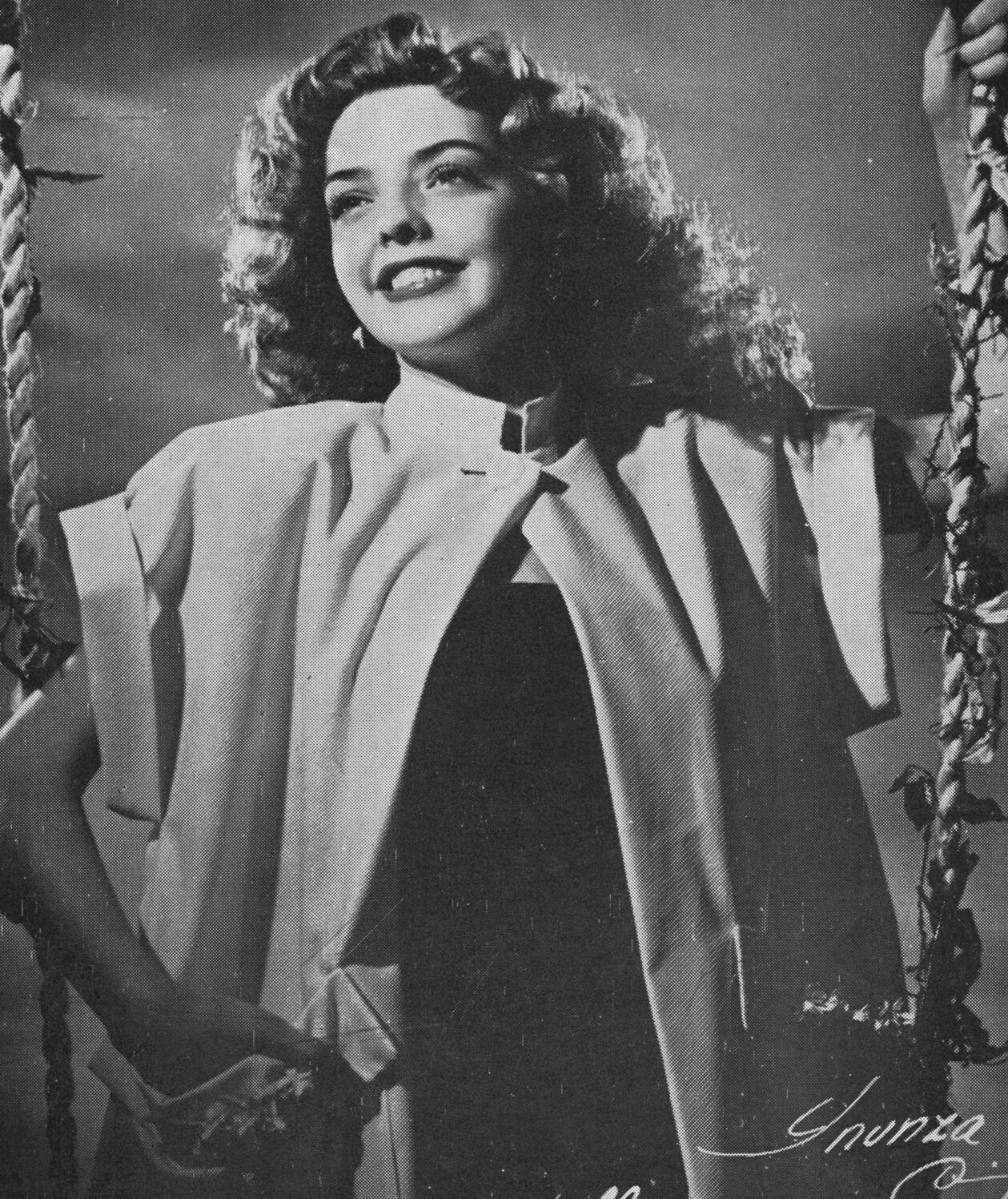
- Gutiérrez in 1954
- Born: Anabel Gutiérrez Aicua; 17 September 1931; Mexico City, Mexico
- Died: 21 August 2022 (aged 90); State of Puebla, Mexico
- Occupation: Actress
- Years active: 1949–2019
- Children: Amairani
- Relatives: Macarena García (granddaughter)

Anabel Gutiérrez Aicua (17 September 1931 – 21 August 2022) was a Mexican actress and comedian. Her most memorable works included her participation in the film School for Tramps (1955), as well as her appearances on the program Chespirito (1970), playing the character of Doña Espotaverderona in some sketches.

== Biography ==
Anabel Gutiérrez Aicua was born in Mexico City on 17 September 1931.

After making two films as an extra in 1949, El Diablo no es Tan Diablo, where she played with a yo-yo and La liga de las muchachas, Gutiérrez began to be offered larger parts. One of the first was in the 1950 film Deseada, where she starred opposite Dolores del Río in an older sister / younger sister love triangle with Jorge Mistral. The film had 5 nominations for Ariel Awards and won for best musical score. That same year, she also acted in the film, Azahares para tu boda with Fernando Soler, Marga Lopez, Sara Garcia and Joaquin Pardavé.

With that recognition, other work followed and soon Gutiérrez became known as a young teenaged star. She made several movies in quick succession, but her most memorable roles were for Muchachas de uniforme (1951), Rostros olvidados (1952), and Escuela de vagabundos (1954), which for each, she was nominated for the Ariel Award for Best Youth Actor. She won the award for Escuela de vagabundos in 1956.

Some of her other memorable roles opposite renowned Mexican actors include: La visita que no tocó el timbre (1954) with Miroslava; Angelitos del trapecio (1959) with Viruta y Capulina; El coyote emplumado (1983) with María Elena Velasco and her last film was in 1999 for the film La paloma de Marsella with Germán Robles.

In the late 1960s, Gutiérrez began working in television and developed a working relationship with Gómez Bolaños Roberto that would bring her second fame. Her first series with him was in El Ciudadano Gómez but the work that made her an icon is Doña Espotaverderona, the mother of La Chimoltrufia, in the television program Chespirito.

== Personal life and death ==
Gutiérrez was the mother of the actress Amairani and grandmother of the actress Macarena García Romero. She died on 21 August 2022, at age 90.

== Awards ==
- Muchachas de uniforme (1952), nominated for the Ariel Award for Best Youth Actor
- Rostros olvidados (1953), nominated for the Ariel Award for Best Youth Actor
- Escuela de vagabundos (1956), won the Ariel Award for Best Youth Actor

== Filmography ==
=== Films ===
- El diablo no es tan diablo (1949) – Yoyo's friend (uncredited)
- La liga de las muchachas (1950) – (uncredited)
- Orange Blossom for Your Wedding (1950) – Margarita
- Al son del mambo (1950) – Dancer
- Desired (1951) – Nicte
- Girls in Uniform (1951)
- Rostros olvidados (1952) – Julieta
- El Ruiseñor del barrio (1952) – Neron's daughter
- Huracán Ramírez (1953)
- Women Who Work (1953) – Gloria Esparza
- Beatriz no te ofendas (1953) – Margarita
- Seven Women (1953)
- Caribeña (1955)
- Venganza en el circo (1954) – Stella
- The Three Elenas (1954) – Elena, granddaughter
- A Tailored Gentleman (1954) – Luisa
- La visita que no tocó el timbre (1954) – Margot
- School for Tramps (1954) – Laura Valverde
- Amor de lejos (1955) – Irma
- Llamas contra el viento (1956) – Laura
- El ratón (1956) – Diana
- Las aventuras de Pito Pérez (1957) – Chucha
- Música en la noche (1958)
- Angelitos del trapecio (1959) – Lina
- Quietos todos (1959) – Rosita
- His First Love (1960)
- Los resbalosos (1959) – Carmela
- Los resbalosos (1960) – Carmela
- Discoteca es amor (1979) Miss Clarita
- El coyote emplumado (1983) – Drunk American woman
- La paloma de Marsella (1999)

=== Television ===
- Variedades de media noche (1958)
- México 1900 (1964)
- Cárcel de mujeres (1968)
- Chespirito (1989–1995) – Doña Espotaverderona / Socorro / and others
- Alguna vez tendremos alas (1997) Bernardita
- Locura de amor (2000) – Corina
- Primer amor, a mil por hora (2000) – Ella
- Carita de Ángel (2000) – Pordiosera
- XHDRBZ (2002)
- Niños que miran al cielo (2002)
- Hada de cabaret (2002)
- Despojo (2002)
- Bajo la misma piel (2003) – Rosita
- Recuerdos que atormentan (2003)
- Días de suerte (2005)
- La Enfermera De La Muerte (2005)
- Mujer casos de la vida real (2002–2005) – Lupita
- Lola, érase una vez (2007) – Monserrat's mother
- La Rosa de Guadalupe (2013, episode: "La burra")
