= TVyNovelas Award for Best Actress in a Drama Series =

Television recognition of excellence

- Awarded for: Best performance by an actress in a drama series
- First award: 2017; Ana Brenda Contreras; Blue Demon
- Currently held by: 2020; Itati Cantoral; Silvia Pinal, frente a ti

The TVyNovelas Award for Best Actress in a Drama Series is presented annually by Televisa and the magazine TVyNovelas to honor the best Mexican television productions, including telenovelas. The award ceremony rotates between Mexico City and Acapulco.

== Winners and nominees ==
=== 2010s ===
Winner	Nominated
35th TVyNovelas Awards
Ana Brenda Contreras for Blue Demon	Gabriela de la Garza for Yago; Laura Montijano for Login; Mayrin Villanueva for Mujeres de negro
36th TVyNovelas Awards
Mariana Torres for Hoy voy a cambiar	Gabriela Roel for Hoy voy a cambiar; Iliana Fox for Dogma
~~2019~~

=== 2020s ===
Winner	Nominated
38th TVyNovelas Awards
Itatí Cantoral for Silvia Pinal, frente a ti	Ligia Uriarte for Sin miedo a la verdad; Macarena García for Los elegidos
