= Caribbean (film) =

Caribbeanis the title of the following films:

- Caribbean (1953 film), a joint Mexican-Guatemalan drama production
- Caribbean Gold, alternate title Caribbean, a 1952 American pirate film
