= Cárcel de mujeres =

Cárcel de mujeres may refer to:

- Cárcel de mujeres (TV series), a 1968 Mexican telenovela
- Women's Prison (1951 film) (Spanish: Cárcel de mujeres), a Mexican drama film
- Cárcel de mujeres (Chilean TV series)
