= Like or Die =

- Theatrical release poster
- Directed by: Carlos Santos Campos
- Written by: Carlos Santos Campos
- Produced by: Fernanda Meza
- Starring: Mónica Huarte
- Cinematography: David Trejo
- Edited by: Carlos Santos Campos
- Music by: Tomás Barreiro
- Production company: Sastre Films
- Distributed by: Cinépolis Distribución
- Release dates: October 23, 2023 (FICM); November 2, 2023 (Mexico)
- Running time: 110 minutes
- Country: Mexico
- Language: Spanish
- Box office: $1,3 million

Like or Die (Spanish: Señora influencer, lit. 'Mrs. Influencer') is a 2023 Mexican satirical black comedy psychological horror film directed, written and edited by Carlos Santos Campos. It stars Mónica Huarte accompanied by Macarena García, Diana Carreiro, Bárbara Lombardo, Mau Nieto, Daniela Peña, Leonardo Daniel and Memo Dorantes. It is about a middle-aged woman who is obsessed to become an influencer on social media, which attracts haters and opportunists.

== Plot ==
Fátima Ferreira is a 40-year-old intellectually disabled woman living in Mexico City with her wealthy but emotionally distant father, film director Joaquín Ferreira. After being expelled from the orphanage where she volunteered for striking a child, Fátima steals money from her father to buy a smartphone. Having lived a sheltered life, she becomes fascinated with social media and begins following Argentine lifestyle influencer Jackie Lombardo and the superficial Sofi Fojo. Using more of her father's money, she attends one of Jackie’s seminars, where she emotionally reveals that her mother died by suicide—something she partially blames herself for—and that her father medicates her for an unspecified condition. Encouraged by Jackie's rhetoric of toxic positivity, Fátima decides to become an influencer herself.

Her awkward demeanor and childlike behavior during a livestream quickly go viral, earning her both sympathy and ridicule, including harassment from a user named FelixPerro. As her online presence grows, Sofi and her friend Cami take interest in her, initially exploiting her popularity to boost their own careers. They introduce her to nightlife, fandom culture, and professional branding, dubbing her "Señora Influencer" (Mrs. Influencer). Over time, the trio forms a tenuous friendship.

One night, Fátima visits Sofi after she is assaulted by her boyfriend, Juan. While livestreaming, Fátima inadvertently exposes Sofi's situation, leading Sofi to lash out and admit they had been using her. In a violent breakdown, Fátima kills both Sofi and, shortly after, Juan. Due to Juan's history of abuse, he is presumed responsible, and Fátima is publicly portrayed as having acted in self-defense, gaining widespread media attention and increased fame. She attends a late-night talk show, where she awkwardly sings a self-penned love song to roaring applause.

Fátima's mental state deteriorates as her notoriety grows. After Joaquín suffers a stroke, he reveals that Fátima was responsible for her mother's death: during an argument, she grabbed the steering wheel, causing a fatal crash. Later, Jackie confronts Fátima for plagiarizing her content, further destabilizing her. Fátima attacks Jackie and begins targeting online "haters", abducting several of them—including FelixPerro—and holding them captive in her father’s basement, forcing them to participate in musical performances streamed online.

As suspicion grows, Cami discovers the captives but is subdued by Fátima, who forces her to witness the ordeal. Fátima ultimately sets the house on fire in an apparent attempt to kill everyone inside. However, in a brief moment of clarity, she releases the captives. FelixPerro incapacitates her, leaving her behind as the fire spreads.

The survivors emerge largely unharmed and capitalize on the media frenzy, while public opinion on Fátima becomes polarized, with some viewing her as a victim of cyberbullying and others as a dangerous criminal. Joaquín announces plans to adapt her story into a film. Sometime later, in Buenos Aires, a woman drops her child off at a daycare run by Fátima, who has assumed Jackie's identity after escaping the fire and leaving the real Jackie to die. Living under a new identity, she continues performing her songs with the children.

== Cast ==
The actors participating in this film are:

- Mónica Huarte as Fátima Ferreira
  - Renata Molinar as Kid Fátima
- Diana Carreiro as Camila
- Memo Dorantes as FélixPerro
- Macarena García Romero as Sofi Fojo
- Leonardo Daniel as Joaquín Ferreira
- Bárbara Lombardo as Jackie Lombardo
- Mau Nieto as Paco
- Daniela Peña as Lulu
- Sandra Burgos as Fatima's mom
- Christian Uribe as Roberto Ortiz
- Michelle Durán as Diana Bichota
- Ángel Escarcega as "Machete69"
- Michael Cohn as Juan Treviño
- Alejandro de la Madrid as Imaginary Boyfriend
- Paola Rojas as News Anchor

== Release ==
Like or Die had its world premiere on October 23, 2023, at the 21st Morelia International Film Festival. It was commercially released on November 2, 2023, in Mexican theaters.

== Accolades ==
Year	Award	Category	Recipient	Result	Ref.
2023	19th Canacine Awards	Best Film	Like or Die	Nominated	
2023	19th Canacine Awards	Best Director	Carlos Santos Campos	Nominated	
2023	19th Canacine Awards	Best Actress	Mónica Huarte	Nominated	
2023	19th Canacine Awards	Best Newcomer - Male	Memo Dorantes	Nominated	
2023	19th Canacine Awards	Best Newcomer - Female	Macarena García	Nominated	
2024	49th Diosas de Plata	Best Film	Like or Die	Nominated	
2024	49th Diosas de Plata	Best Director	Carlos Santos Campos	Nominated	
2024	49th Diosas de Plata	Best Actress	Mónica Huarte	Won	
2024	49th Diosas de Plata	Best Supporting Actor	Leonardo Daniel	Nominated	
2024	49th Diosas de Plata	Best Supporting Actress	Diana Carreiro	Nominated	
2024	49th Diosas de Plata	Best Newcomer - Female	Macarena García Romero	Won	
2024	49th Diosas de Plata	Best Actor in a Minor Role	Mau Nieto	Nominated	
2024	49th Diosas de Plata	Best Original Screenplay	Carlos Santos Campos	Nominated	
2024	49th Diosas de Plata	Best Music	Tomás Barreiro	Won	
2024	49th Diosas de Plata	Best Original Song	"Nada" by Leonel García	Nominated	
2024	66th Ariel Awards	Best Actress	Mónica Huarte	Nominated	
