= El coyote emplumado =

- Directed by: María Elena Velasco
- Screenplay by: María Elena Velasco
- Story by: Goretti Lipkies
- Produced by: Antonio Matouk
- Starring: María Elena Velasco; Miguel Ángel Rodríguez; Armando Soto La Marina
- Cinematography: Javier Cruz
- Edited by: Max Sánchez
- Music by: Sergio Guerrero
- Production company: Producciones Matouk
- Release date: 1983
- Running time: 98 minutes
- Country: Mexico
- Language: Spanish

El coyote emplumado (English: The Feathered Coyote) is a 1983 Mexican action comedy film directed by and starring María Elena Velasco.

== Plot ==
María and her grandfather sells artisan goods in their small town. Martín, María's boyfriend is in jail after beating up someone who was flirting with María. They are in the meantime invited to Acapulco to sell their goods in an international archaeology congress held by CONACULTA and headed by an archaeology expert, Dr. Villegas. Unbeknownst to them, Dr. Villegas brought them over for them to make a clay replica of a special stone coyote, El Coyote Emplumado (an imitation of Quetzalcoatl, the Feathered Serpent). While in there they make many replicas that are not to the satisfaction of Don Lupe, until they make a last one which finally suits him. Meanwhile, a sadistic robber named Romano is seeking to get the real coyote to sell it. Figuring that the copies would sell, Maria and Don Lupe take them to their small post where many of the foreign delegates buy them. Romano later uses laughing gas to steal the coyote from its place of security. The professor later explains to the commissioner how he foresaw this and confesses the real coyote is hidden. Unfortunately, he also gets a replica instead of the real one. Villegas goes back to Maria's hut and angrily demands the return of the art piece, when María confesses about the sale of the other ones. In the meantime, infuriated that he got the clay replica, Romano demands an assistant of Villegas, Navarro (who is actually an accomplice) to get him the real coyote. As María and Dr. Villegas head and search for the rest of the coyotes they encounter many mishaps, and one after the other are discovered to just be replicas. After a while they head to the last coyote, when Romano grabs first. After being taken by a helicopter which turns out to be the police in disguise, Romano throws the coyote into the sea, saying that if its not for him it's for nobody. AS they are all taken to the local commissary, a group of policemen arrive having searched the small hut where Maria and Don Lupe were staying. They only find a large clay jar with some flowers in it. Suddenly Maria remembers and after taking the flowers off discovers the actual stone coyote was in their possession all along.

== Cast ==
- María Elena Velasco as María
- Armando Soto La Marina as don Lupe
- Carlos Riquelme as Professor Villegas
- Noé Murayama as Romano
- Claudio Sorel as Navarro
- Sandra Boyd as Romano's girlfriend
- Anabel Gutiérrez as Drunk American tourist
