= Macarena García Romero =

Mexican actress (born 2000)

Macarena García
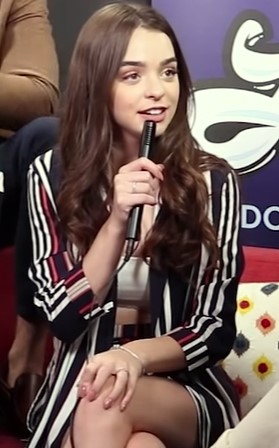
- Born: Macarena García Romero; 26 October 2000 (age 26); Huixquilucan, State of Mexico
- Other name: Maca García
- Occupations: Actress; singer
- Years active: 2012–present
- Parent: Amairani (mother)
- Relatives: Anabel Gutiérrez (grandmother)

Macarena García Romero (born 26 October 2000) is a Mexican actress. She is known for playing the roles of Natalia Alexander in the series Control Z, Alex in 100 días para enamorarnos, and Valeria Bernal in the telenovela Mi secreto.

== Early life ==
Macarena García Romero is the daughter of actress Amairani, with whom she has even shared the stage in some plays, and granddaughter of actress Anabelle Gutiérrez, who is considered an acting legend and one of the pioneers of the Golden Age of Mexican Cinema.

Macarena has two siblings named Fernanda Garcia and Juan Luis Arias. Her father, whom Maca refers to as her angel, died when she was only 9 years old. From a very young age she felt a passion for the arts. In addition to pursuing a career as an actress, she is also a classical ballet dancer and loves to write, she even created a personal blog in 2019 called Maca sin filtros, where she talks a bit about her life and addresses topics such as fashion, health and beauty.

== Career ==
García Romero's first acting role was in 2012 in the telenovela Amor bravío. She played Tania in the telenovela Muy padres (2017). She has also appeared in some episodes of Como dice el dicho.

Her first starring role came in the 2018 telenovela Like, la leyenda, in which she was also part of the musical group of the series. In July 2019, García Romero played the role of Sandra García in the fantasy series Los elegidos, in which she was also responsible for the opening theme song, titled "Familia de Verdad".

In 2020, García Romero was cast in the Telemundo telenovela 100 días para enamorarnos. In the plot, Macarena plays Ale Rivera (who later takes the name Alex Rivera), an introverted soccer-loving teenager who faces an internal and personal process of learning to accept himself as he is, a transgender boy. Also in 2020, she played Natalia Alexander, a high-achieving student who keeps a big secret, in the Netflix series, Control Z.

In 2023, García Romero made her film debut in Señora Influencer. In the movie, she played Sofi Fojo, an opportunistic influencer who tries to take advantage of another influencer's sudden popularity.

== Filmography ==
=== Film ===
Year	Title	Role	Notes
2023	Señora Influencer	Sofi Fojo	

=== Television ===
Year	Title	Role	Notes
2012	Amor bravío	Ana Albarrán	Recurring role; 14 episodes
2017	Como dice el dicho	Elsa Gabriela	Episode: "La verdad no peca, pero incomoda" Episode: "Bien reza quien en servir a Dios piensa"
2017–2018	Muy padres	Tania Pérez-Valdés Rivapalacio	69 episodes
2018–2019	Like	María Asunción "Machu" Salas Oliver	Main role
2018	Sin miedo a la verdad	Mony	Episode: "Tratantes de personas"
2019	Los elegidos	Sandra García	Main role
2019	Decisiones: Unos ganan, otros pierden	Verónica Sánchez	Episode: "La Venganza"
2020–2021	100 días para enamorarnos	Alejandra / Alejandro Rivera "Alex"	Main role
2020–2022	Control Z	Natalia Alexander	Main role
2022–2023	Mi secreto	Valeria Bernal	Main role
2022	Detective Belascoarán	Virginia	Episode: "Cosa fácil"
2022	Mujeres asesinas	Silvia Acevedo Martinez	Episode: "Las golondrinas"
2022	La rebelión	Young Mónica	Recurring role
2024–2025	Accidente	Lucía Lobo	Main role
2025	Chespirito: Sin querer queriendo	Young Graciela	Episode: "Zapatero a tus zapatos"
2026	Doc	Dr. Alba Granados	Main role
2026	Timbiriche	Sasha Sokol	Main role

== Awards and nominations ==
Year	Award	Category	Work	Result	Ref.
2019	Premios TVyNovelas	Best Young Lead Actress	Like	Nominated	
2020	Premios TVyNovelas	Best Actress in a Drama Series	Los elegidos	Nominated	
2020	Kids Choice Awards México	Favorite Actress	N/A	Nominated	
2021	Kids Choice Awards México	Favorite Actress	100 días para enamorarnos	Won	
2022	Kids Choice Awards México	Favorite Actress	N/A	Won	
2023	Canacine Awards	Best Newcomer - Female	Señora Influencer	Nominated	
2024	Diosas de Plata Awards	Best Newcomer - Female	Señora Influencer	Won	
