= México 1900 =

- Genre: Telenovela
- Country of origin: Mexico
- Original language: Spanish

Original release
- Network: Telesistema Mexicano
- Release: 1964

México 1900 is a Mexican telenovela produced by Televisa for Telesistema Mexicano in 1964.

== Cast ==
- María Elena Marqués
- Ada Carrasco
- Raúl Meraz
- Anabel Gutiérrez
