= Timbiriche (TV series) =

- Genre: Biographical
- Written by: José Miguel Núñez; Daniela Gómez
- Directed by: Humberto Hinojosa
- Starring: Osvaldo Benavides; Alberto Guerra; Iker Solano; Jesusa Ochoa; Luis de la Rosa; Macarena García; Sebastián Poza; Michelle Pellicer; Sol Wainer
- Composer: Rodrigo Dávila
- Country of origin: Mexico
- Original language: Spanish
- No. of seasons: 1
- No. of episodes: 8

Production
- Executive producers: Osvaldo Benavides; Alberto Guerra; José Miguel Núñez; Juana Blaya; Humberto Hinojosa; Pablo Cruz
- Producers: Abel Cruz; Enrique López Lavigne
- Cinematography: Marc Beliver
- Editor: José Pablo Escalera
- Camera setup: Multi-camera
- Production company: El Estudio

Original release
- Network: Vix
- Release: 9 October – 30 October 2026

Timbiriche is a Mexican biographical television series. It tells the story of the origin, evolution and rise of the Latin pop group Timbiriche. The premiered on Vix on 9 October 2026.

== Cast ==
=== Main ===
- Osvaldo Benavides as Luis de Llano
- Alberto Guerra as Héctor Ferrel
- Edu Maruri as Eduardo Capetillo
- Jesusa Ochoa as Alix Bauer
  - Valentina Rivas Daveri as 11-year-old Alix
- Iker Solano as Diego Schoening
  - Facundo Dodera Fuerte as 13-year-old Diego
- Luis de la Rosa as Erik Rubín
  - Rodrigo Costa Pereyra as 11-year-old Erik
- Macarena García as Sasha Sokol
  - Cleo Buscaglia as 12-year-old Sasha
- Sebastián Poza as Benny Ibarra
  - Bruno Couturier as 12-year-old Benny
- Michelle Pellicer as Paulina Rubio
  - Isabella Imgriaco as 11-year-old Paulina
- Sol Wainer as Mariana Garza
  - Juana Pianavilla Quinteiro as 12-year-old Mariana

=== Recurring and guest stars ===
- Carla Moscatelli as Elena Galindo
- Eduardo Migliónico as Román Ferrel
- Florencia Rocca as Martha
- Franco Rilla as Fernando
- Gabriela Freire as Magdalena
- Giselle Motta as Susana Dosamantes
- Jaume Mateu as Juan
- Marcel Sawchik Monegal as Arturo
- Rodrigo Brocal as Miguel Bosé
- Romina Peluffo as Julissa
- Joanna Oliveira as Laura
- Kaef Valverde as Jack
- Rafael Beltrán as Memo Méndez
- Sofía Silberberg as Sandra
- Cecilia Raquel Carbonell as Yolanda
- Clara Dalmao as Thalía
- Fernando Hernández as Kiko Campos
- Pedro Duarte as Fernando Ribos
- Andrea Chaparro as Edith Márquez
- Franco Piffaretti as Carlos
- Sergio Gorfain Miranda as Alfie Calles
- Sofía Yorado as Ángela
- Camila Vives as Gaby

== Production ==
Filming of the series took place from October to December 2024. In May 2026, the series was officially announced at TelevisaUnivision's upfront for the 2026–2027 television season.

The creative process involved research and adaptation based on real events and people. In an interview with Newsline Report, director Beto Hinojosa and producer Pablo Cruz discussed the research that informed the series. Screenwriter José Miguel Núñez, who co-wrote the series with Daniela Gómez, explained that the team consulted people close to those portrayed and drew on journalistic research, including archival footage and press coverage.

Núñez said the writers were clear from the outset that Sokol was the victim and that De Llano’s conduct could only be portrayed as wrong, not justified. He also expressed his view that the finished series makes clear that the behavior depicted is not endorsed by the production.

== Episodes ==
No.	Title	Original release date
1	"Somos amigos"	9 October 2026
2	"Corro, vuelo, me acelero"	9 October 2026
3	"Soy un desastre"	16 October 2026
4	"Con todos menos contigo"	16 October 2026
5	"Si no es ahora"	23 October 2026
6	"Tú y yo somos uno mismo"	23 October 2026
7	"Rueda mi mente"	30 October 2026
8	"La vida es mejor cantando"	30 October 2026
