= Desired (film) =

1951 film by Roberto Gavaldón

- Directed by: Roberto Gavaldón
- Written by: José Baviera; Roberto Gavaldón; Eduardo Marquina (play); Antonio Mediz Bolio; José Revueltas
- Produced by: Clemente Guízar Mendoza
- Starring: Dolores del Río; Jorge Mistral; José Baviera
- Cinematography: Alex Phillips
- Edited by: Carlos Savage
- Music by: Eduardo Hernández Moncada; Carlos Jiménez Mabarak
- Production company: Producciones Sanson
- Release date: 5 April 1951
- Running time: 85 minutes
- Country: Mexico
- Language: Spanish

Desired (Spanish: Deseada) is a 1951 Mexican drama film directed by Roberto Gavaldón and starring Dolores del Río, Jorge Mistral and José Baviera. It contains substantial footage shot in Yucatan, much of it in and around the Maya site of Chichen Itza.

== Cast ==
- Dolores del Río as Deseada
- Jorge Mistral as Manuel
- José Baviera as Don Lorenzo
- Anabelle Gutiérrez as Nicte
- Arturo Soto Rangel as Don Anselmo
- Enriqueta Reza as Quiteria
- Héctor Herrera as El Casamentero
- Wibeut Puerta as El Pintor
- Don Chinto as El Chic
- Rosario Gutiérrez as Rosario
- E. Puga as El Alfarero
- Nicolás Urcelay as Invitado

== Bibliography ==
- DeWitt Bodeen. From Hollywood: The Careers of 15 Great American Stars. A. S. Barnes, 1976.
