= Amairani =

Mexican actress (born 1970)

- Born: Amairani Romero Gutiérrez; 6 April 1970 (age 55); Mexico City, Mexico
- Occupation: Actress
- Years active: 1988–1996, 2007–present
- Children: 3, including Macarena García
- Mother: Anabel Gutiérrez

Amairani Romero Gutiérrez (born 6 April 1970), known by the mononym Amairani, is a Mexican actress.

== Early life and career ==
Amairani was born in Mexico City, Mexico on 6 April 1970. She is the daughter of actress Anabel Gutiérrez. Amairani debuted as an actress in the 1988 telenovela Dulce desafío. She later appeared in the 1989 telenovela Simplemente Maria as Laura Rivera del Villar, followed by playing an antagonist in the 1992 telenovela Mágica juventud.

She also appeared in the telenovela Más allá del puente as Lupita, replacing Itati Cantoral from the prequel De frente al sol. In 1994, she again played the role of an antagonist in Marimar. Before her retirement, her last acting role was in La sombra del otro. In 1996, she decided to retire from telenovelas, at least for the time being, to be a mother for her three children. After her last childbirth, she had complications, including paralysis, weight gain and severe depression.

After 11 years, Amairani returned to television screens in Mujer, casos de la vida real. She also played in the telenovelas Lola, érase una vez, Palabra de Mujer, Camaleones and Atrévete a soñar. In 2009, she played the evil Federica Martinez in Nathalie Lartilleux's Mar de amor. In 2011, she appeared in Una familia con suerte, and in 2012, she played in Miss XV and Corona de lágrimas.

== Filmography ==
=== Television ===
Year	Title	Role	Notes
1988–89	Dulce desafío	Rocío	Supporting role
1989–90	Simplemente Maria	Laura Rivera del Villar de López	Supporting role
1992–93	Mágica juventud	Consuelo Gutiérrez	Supporting role
1993–94	Más allá del puente	Lupita Buenrostro	Supporting role
1993	Papá soltero	Cinthya	TV series
1994	Al derecho y al derbez	Cenossienta	TV series
1994	Marimar	Natalia Montenegro	Supporting role
1996	La sombra del otro	Cora Meléndez	Supporting role
2007	Mujer, casos de la vida real		TV series
2007	Vecinos		TV series
2007–08	Lola, érase una vez	Sandra Espinosa	
2007–08	Palabra de Mujer	Sonia de San Román	Supporting role
2009	La rosa de Guadalupe		TV series
2009–10	Camaleones	Señora de Rincón	Supporting role
2009–10	Atrévete a soñar	Janet	Supporting role
2009–10	Mar de amor	Federica Martínez	Supporting role
2011–12	Una familia con suerte	Catalina	Guest star
2011–14	Como dice el dicho	Lucy / Rosana / Roberta / Laila	4 episodes
2012	Miss XV	Juana Palacios / Lady Venenosa	Supporting role
2012–2023	Corona de lágrimas	Érika Cordero	Supporting role
2017–18	Me declaro culpable	Luciana	Guest star
2018	Por amar sin ley	Karina de Acosta	Supporting role
2018	Like	María Inés	
2024	Vivir de amor	Elena del Olmo	
