= Su nombre era Dolores, la Jenn que yo conocí =

- Genre: Biographical
- Based on: Su nombre era Dolores: La Jenn que yo conocí by Pete Salgado
- Story by: Pete Salgado
- Directed by: Alfonso Pineda Ulloa; Alejandro Aimetta; Álvaro Curiel
- Creative director: Sandra Cabriada
- Starring: See list
- Music by: Raúl Vizzi; Camilo Froideval; Dan Zlotnik
- Opening theme: "Dolores" by Lupillo Rivera
- Country of origin: Mexico
- Original language: Spanish
- No. of seasons: 1
- No. of episodes: 26

Production
- Cinematography: Jero Rod-García
- Editors: Camilo Abadía; Jonathan Pellicer
- Camera setup: Multi-camera
- Production company: BTF Media

Original release
- Network: Univision
- Release: January 15 – April 9, 2017

Related
- Mariposa de Barrio

Su nombre era Dolores, la Jenn que yo conocí, is a Spanish-language television series created by BTF Media. It is based on the book that executive producer Pete Salgado wrote about Jenni Rivera's life. The series is starring Luz Ramos as Jenni Rivera and Javier Díaz Dueñas as Pete Salgado. It premiered on January 15, 2017.

== Cast ==
=== Main ===
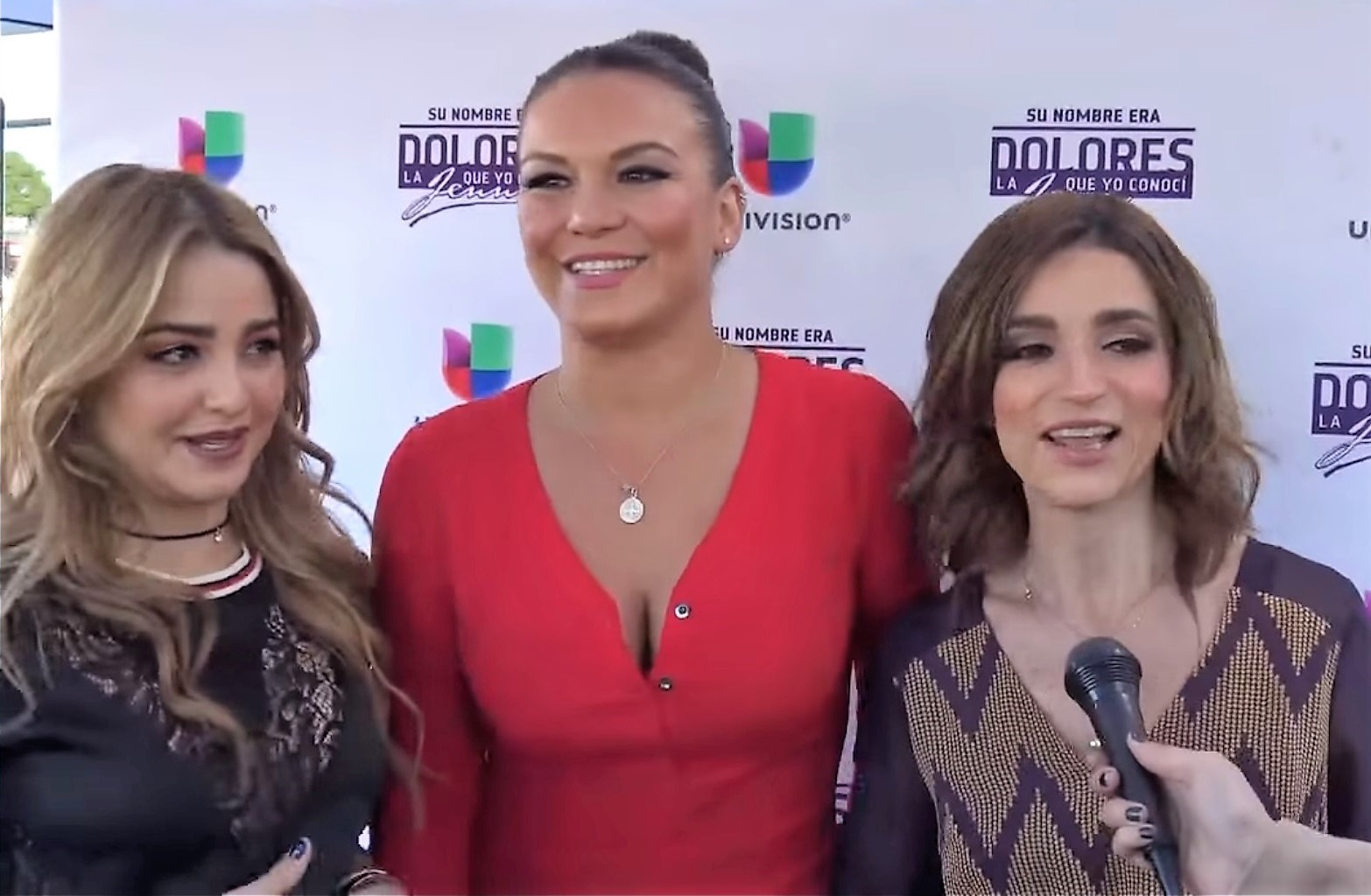
Geraldine Galván, Luz Ramos, Marianna Burelli interviewed about Su nombre era Dolores by Dulce Osuna in 2017

- Luz Ramos as Jenni Rivera
- Javier Díaz Dueñas as Pete Salgado
- Luis Felipe Tovar as Gabo
- María Rojo as Doña Rosa Saavedra
- Álex Perea as Ferny
- Marianna Burelli as Rosie Rivera
- Geraldine Galván as Chiquis Rivera
- Tomás Goros as Don Pedro
- Liliana Moyano as Julie Vázquez
- Liz Gallardo as Graciela Beltrán
- Fernando Becerril as Anthony López
- Delia Casanova as Doña Gloria Salgado
- Ricardo Leguízamo as Lupillo Rivera
- Adrián Alonso as Mikey
- Hugo Albores as Gustavo Rivera
- Arnulfo Reyes Sánchez as Pastor Pete
- Jana Raluy as Jessica Maldonado
- Andrea Ortega-Lee as Jacquie / Jacquie (17-24)
- Rubén Zamora as Juan López

=== Recurring ===
- Hugo Catalán as Jacob Yebale
- Daniel Martínez as Esteban Loaiza
- Dagoberto Gama as Mario Macías
- Lumi Cavazos as Gigi Jara
- Juan Manuel Bernal as Ángel del Villar
- Vanessa Bauche as Mari Urdaneta
- Claudette Maillé as Laura Lucio

=== Special guest stars ===
- Rodrigo Massa as Taxista ojos verdes 2
- Alejandro Bracho as Padre Eric
- Enrique Arreola as Trino Marín
- Gilda Haddock as Charytín Goyco
- Alberich Bormann as Chato
- Juan Soler as Eduardo Z

== Production ==
The production of the series began on September 5, 2016 in Mexico and Los Angeles. Sheyla Tadeo recorded more than 20 songs for the series because Luz Ramos does not sing.

== Episodes ==
No. overall	No. in season	Title	Directed by	Original release date
1	1	"Welcome to mi vida loca"	Álvaro Curiel	January 15, 2017
2	2	"Los números no mienten"	Álvaro Curiel	January 15, 2017
3	3	"Mexico Is the Key"	Álvaro Curiel	January 22, 2017
4	4	"Trouble Maker"	Álvaro Curiel	January 22, 2017
5	5	"Pinche Pelón"	Álvaro Curiel	January 29, 2017
6	6	"Primera división"	Álvaro Curiel	January 29, 2017
7	7	"Hoochie Power"	Álvaro Curiel	February 5, 2017
8	8	"Culpable o Inocente"	Álvaro Curiel	February 5, 2017
9	9	"Dolores"	Alfonso Pineda Ulloa	February 12, 2017
10	10	"Cervezas y diamantes"	Alfonso Pineda Ulloa	February 12, 2017
11	11	"Sufriendo a solas"	Alfonso Pineda Ulloa	February 19, 2017
12	12	"Pornogate"	Alfonso Pineda Ulloa	February 19, 2017
13	13	"El corrido del cinco"	Alfonso Pineda Ulloa	February 26, 2017
14	14	"Madre soltera"	Alfonso Pineda Ulloa	February 26, 2017
15	15	"Presumida de lo suyo"	Alfonso Pineda Ulloa	March 5, 2017
16	16	"Behind the Scenes"	Alfonso Pineda Ulloa	March 5, 2017
17	17	"La gran señora"	Alfonso Pineda Ulloa	March 12, 2017
18	18	"Maldita feria"	Alfonso Pineda Ulloa	March 12, 2017
19	19	"Tres palenques y un funeral"	Alfonso Pineda Ulloa	March 19, 2017
20	20	"Chiquis sin control"	Alejandro Aimetta	March 19, 2017
21	21	"Bitch Boss"	Alejandro Aimetta	March 26, 2017
22	22	"Joyas de Fantasía"	Alejandro Aimetta	March 26, 2017
23	23	"Sombras"	Alejandro Aimetta	April 2, 2017
24	24	"Lágrimas caen"	Alejandro Aimetta	April 2, 2017
25	25	"Purgatorio"	Alejandro Aimetta	April 9, 2017
26	26	"Adiós Dolores"	Alejandro Aimetta	April 9, 2017
