= Luz Ramos =

Mexican actress (born 1987)

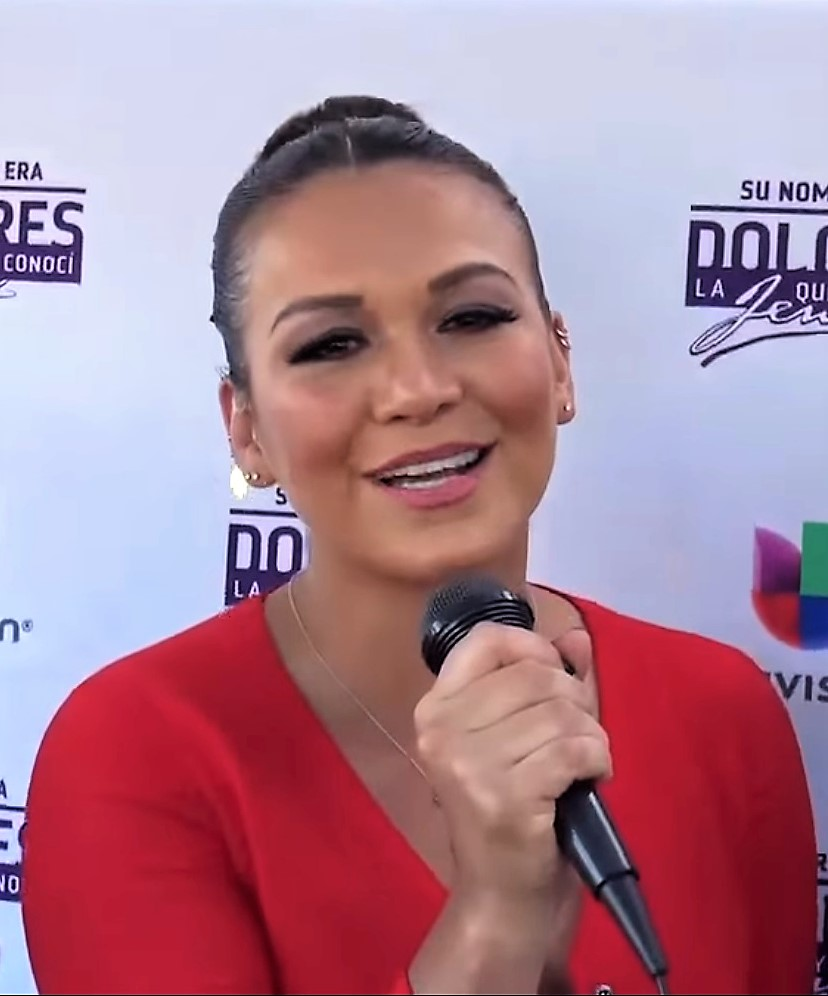
- Luz Ramos en Dulce Osuna.jpg
- Born: April 20, 1987 (age 39); Autlán de Navarro, Jalisco, Mexico
- Occupation: Actress

Luz Ramos (born April 20, 1987) is a Mexican television and film actress, known for her roles in biographical series such as El Vato and Hasta que te conocí. She was cast as the star of the series based on the life of Jenni Rivera, Su nombre era Dolores, la Jenn que yo conocí.

== Filmography ==
=== Films ===
Year	Title	Roles	Notes
2013	Mimesis	La animadora	Short film

=== Television ===
Year	Title	Roles	Notes
2008	La rosa de Guadalupe	Natalia	Episode: "Te amaré hasta el final"
2010–11	Los héroes del norte	Yareli	3 episodes
2012	Un refugio para el amor	Unknown role	2 episodes
2012	Secretos de vecindad	Raquel	Recurring role
2013	Entre sábanas negras	Luz Torres	Recurring role
2014–2015	Como dice el dicho	Micaela / Olivia / Elizabeth	3 episodes
2016	El Vato	Roxana Sotomayor	Episode: "¿Tienes talento?"
2016	Hasta que te conocí	Meche	Recurring role; 5 episodes
2016	Señora Acero	Carmen Vistas	Recurring role
2017	Su nombre era Dolores, la Jenn que yo conocí	Jenni Rivera	Lead role
2017–2018	Caer en tentación	Laura	Main cast
2019	Ringo	Rosa	Main cast
2019	Preso No. 1	Clara Nevares	Main cast
2020	Súbete a mi moto	Luisa	Recurring role
2020–2021	Imperio de mentiras	Adriana	Main cast
2024	El amor no tiene receta	Mireya Roble Ruiz	Main cast
