= La visita que no tocó el timbre =

- Directed by: Julián Soler
- Written by: Luis Alcoriza; Janet Alcoriza
- Produced by: Óscar Dancigers
- Starring: Miroslava, Abel Salazar, Manuel Fábregas
- Cinematography: Rosalío Solano
- Edited by: Carlos Savage
- Music by: Luis Hernández Bretón
- Release date: 11 September 1954
- Country: Mexico
- Language: Spanish

La Visita Que No Tocó El Timbre ("The Visit That Did Not Ring The Bell") is a 1954 Mexican film written by Luis Alcoriza. Two brothers who live together take responsibility for an abandoned baby. Mario Camus directed a remake of the movie in 1965.
