= Lambda García =

Mexican actor

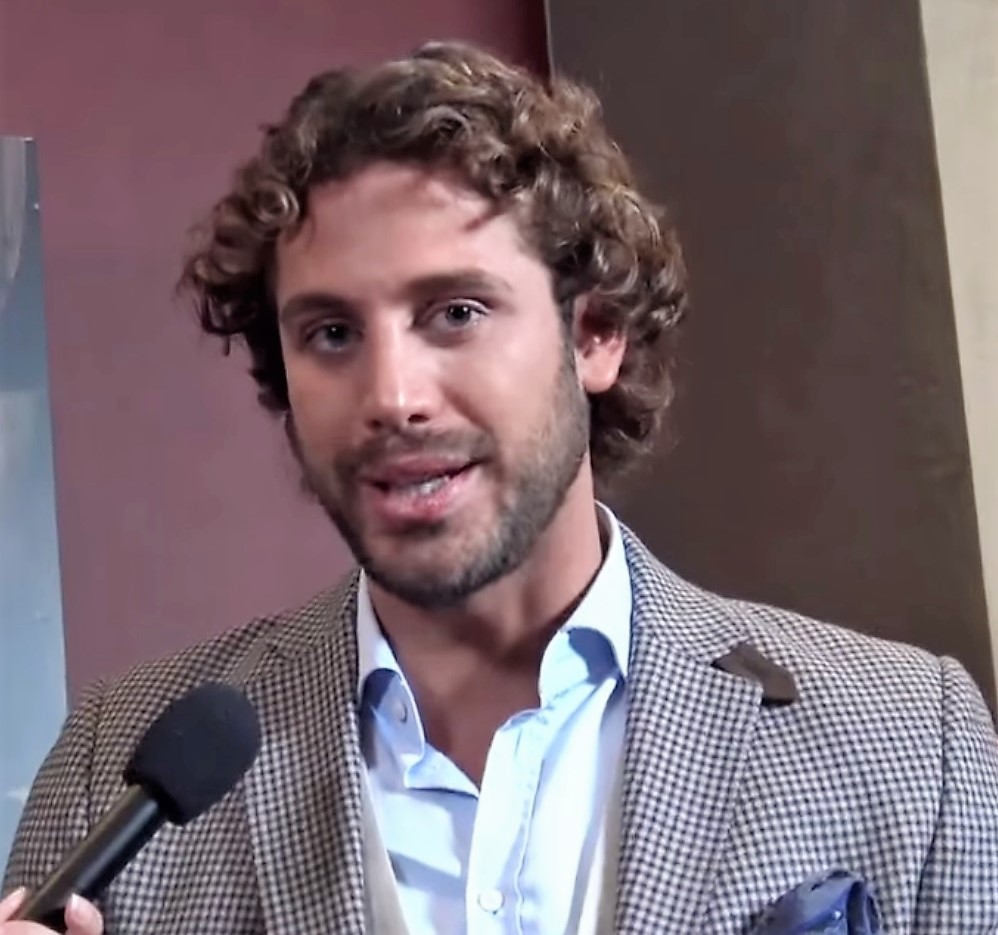
- García interviewed by Dulce Osuna in 2017
- Born: Lambda Germán García González; January 7, 1987 (age 38); Mexico City, Mexico
- Occupation: Actor
- Years active: 2007–present

Lambda Germán García González (born January 7, 1987) is a Mexican actor.

== Biography ==
García studied acting at the Centro de Estudios y Formación Actoral para Televisión (CEFAT) of TV Azteca, with his teachers Dora Cordero and Raúl Quintanilla; he also attended the Broadway Dance Academy to study musical theater.

== Career ==
García began his acting career in the telenovela Se busca un hombre in 2007, where he played the role of Diego Villaseñor. The following year, he had a supporting role in the telenovela Cachito de mi corazón. In 2009, he had a supporting role in the telenovela Pasión morena as Gustavo Sirenio. In 2011, García co-starred in the telenovela Cielo rojo, where he played the role of Sebastián Rentería. The following year, he had a supporting role in the telenovela La otra cara del alma as Marcos Figueroa. In 2014, he had a supporting role in the telenovela Las Bravo, where he played the role of Fernando Sánchez, a stripper.

In 2016, García appeared as a guest star in season 4 of the television series El Señor de los Cielos, where he played the role of Nerio Pereira. In 2017, he participated in the television series Paquita la del Barrio, which is based on the life of the Mexican singer of the same name. García played the role of Antonio, the singer's uncle.

== Personal life ==
In December 2016, the actor was outed against his will as pictures of him with fellow actor Polo Morín were leaked to the public. Mexican magazine TVNotas had confirmed that he and Polo Morín had a relationship, but both actors denied it. It was not until July 2019 that Garcia confirmed that he was gay and that he had a relationship with Morín. Morín came to recognize he and Lambda García were in a relationship, but in July 2019 he announced they had broken up.

In November 2020, he announced that he had tested positive for COVID-19 and had to self-isolate.

== Filmography ==
Television
Year	Title	Role	Notes
2007	Se busca un hombre	Diego Villaseñor	
2008	Vivir por ti	Guillermo	
2008	Cachito de mi corazón	William	
2009	Cada quien su santo	Unknown role	2 episodes
2009–2010	Pasión morena	Gustavo Sirenio	
2011–2012	Cielo rojo	Sebastián Renteria	
2012–2013	La otra cara del alma	Marcos Figueroa	
2013	México baila	Contestant	Runner-up
2014–2015	Las Bravo	Fernando Sánchez	
2016	El Señor de los Cielos	Nerio Pereira	Recurring role (season 4); 20 episodes
2016	El Chema	Nerio Pereira	Episodes: "Espectacular fuga" and "Narco en la TV"
2017	Paquita la del Barrio	Antonio	Recurring role; 6 episodes
2017	Milagros de Navidad	Amaro Carpio	Episodes: "Jesús nació en California"
2017–2018	Sangre de mi tierra	Juan José "Juanjo" Montiel	Main role; 59 episodes
2018	Señora Acero	Miguel Sandoval	Recurring role (season 5); 20 episodes
2019	La reina soy yo	Charly Flow	Main role; 78 episodes
2021	Las estrellas bailan en Hoy	Contestant	Winner (season 1)
2022	Top Chef VIP	Contestant	Winner (season 1); 35 episodes
2022	Amor dividido	Danilo Medina	
2023	Los 50	Contestant	13th place
2023	Mira quién baila	Contestant	3rd place (season 11)
2024	Papás por conveniencia	Facundo	
2025	Juegos de amor y poder	Patricio Ferrer Avendaño	

== Theater ==
Year	Title	Role	Place
2010	La bella durmiente	Príncipe Felipe	Teatro Julio Prieto
2011	12 princesas en pugna	Príncipe Encantador	Teatro Julio Prieto
2012	La caja	David	Teatro Renacimiento
2016	Chico conoce a chica	Jorge	Teatro Julio Prieto
