= La reina soy yo =

Mexican telenovela

- Genre: Musical; Telenovela
- Based on: La Reina del Flow by Said Chamie and Claudia Sánchez
- Written by: Fernanda Eguiarte; Larissa Andrade; Alejandra Olvera
- Directed by: Rodrigo Ugalde; Fernando Urdapilleta
- Starring: Michelle Renaud; Lambda García; Mané de la Parra; Polo Morín
- Opening theme: "Depredador" by Gelo Arango
- Country of origin: Mexico
- Original language: Spanish
- No. of seasons: 1
- No. of episodes: 82 (Note: In its original broadcast it had only 78 episodes.)

Production
- Executive producer: Harold Sánchez
- Production locations: Mexico City; Miami, Florida
- Camera setup: Multi-camera
- Production companies: Sony Pictures Television; Teleset

Original release
- Network: Univision (United States); Las Estrellas (Mexico)
- Release: 14 May – 30 August 2019

La reina soy yo (English: I am the Queen), formerly known as Puro Flow, is a Mexican telenovela produced by Teleset and Sony Pictures Television for Televisa. It is an adaptation of the Colombian telenovela La Reina del Flow broadcast by Caracol Televisión. The series stars Michelle Renaud, Mané de la Parra, and Lambda García. It premiered first in the United States on Univision on 13 May 2019 and ended on 30 August 2019. In Mexico the series premiered on Las Estrellas on 26 August 2019, and ended on 17 December 2019.

== Plot ==
The series narrates the life of Yamelí Montoya, a beautiful woman with great talent for musical composition, who after being betrayed by the man she loves, is unjustly condemned. In prison she gives birth to a son who is taken from her, and she believes that he is dead. In prison she is also the victim of an attack and is pronounced dead, a situation that the DEA takes advantage of to give her a new identity and infiltrate her into a criminal organization. With her new identity, Lari Andrade, an important music producer, Yamelí will begin her revenge against those who ruined her life.

== Cast ==
- Michelle Renaud as Yamelí Montoya / Lari Andrade
  - Renata Vaca as Young Yamelí
- Lambda García as Carlos Cruz "Charly Flow"
- Mané de la Parra as Juanjo
  - David Caro Levy as Young Juanjo
- Polo Morín as Erick / Young Charly
- Arleth Terán as Ligia
- Gloria Stalina as Diana
- Pakey Vázquez as Ramón Cruz "Monchis"
- Rodrigo Magaña as Toño
- Adria Morales as Wendy
- Yany Prado as Irma
- Renata Manterola as Vanessa
- Pierre Louis as Axel
- Andrés de la Mora as Sergio
- Sergio Gutiérrez as Cris Vega
- Briggitte Beltrán as Zaria
- Harding Jr. as Ben Rizzo
- María Gonllegos as Carolina Pizarro
- Arturo Peniche as Edgar
- Brandon Peniche as Alberto Cantú
- Marcelo Cordoba as Jack del Castillo

=== Guest stars ===
- Carlos Vives
- Gente de Zona

== U.S. broadcast ==
=== Ratings ===
Viewership and ratings per season of La reina soy yo
| Season | Timeslot (ET) | Episodes | First aired | | Last aired | | Avg. viewers (millions) |
| Season | Timeslot (ET) | Episodes | Date | Viewers (millions) | Date | Viewers (millions) | Avg. viewers (millions) |
|---|---|---|---|---|---|---|---|
| 1 | Mon–Fri 8pm/7c | 77 | 13 May 2019 | 1.38 | 30 August 2019 | 1.32 | 1.23 |

=== Episodes ===
| No. | Title | Original release date | U.S. viewers (millions) |
|---|---|---|---|
| 1 | "Chapter 1" | 13 May 2019 (Note: Premiered early online through Univision website on 10 May 2019.) | 1.38 |
| 2 | "Chapter 2" | 13 May 2019 | 1.38 |
Yamelí is about to complete her sentence in a US jail and she’s getting ready to take revenge on Charly for betraying her. Monchis, Charly's uncle, orders to kill Yamelí and the DEA gives her a new identity so that she can get close to him. 17 years before, after the death of her parents, Yamelí tries to fulfill her dream with the support of Juanjo and Charly, but the presence of Monchis in the neighborhood threatens to change their lives. Soul & Bass organizes its first concert to raise money.
| 3 | "Chapter 3" | 14 May 2019 | 1.12 |
Soul & Bass gets an opportunity to meet a music producer in Miami. Charly plans to make Yamelí fall in love with him and accuse her of drug trafficking to get rid of her. Charly spends the night with Yamelí and takes the opportunity to steal the notebook with her song lyrics.
| 4 | "Chapter 4" | 15 May 2019 | 1.20 |
Yamelí is forced to plead guilty in exchange for saving her grandmother's life. Charly presents the demo of Yamelí's song as his own and the producer offers him a contract with his label. Yamelí discovers that she is pregnant.
| 5 | "Chapter 5" | 16 May 2019 | 1.18 |
Monchis discovers that the baby that Yamelí gave to Carmen is Charly's son and kills her to stay with the baby. 17 years later, Charly returns to Mexico to open his recording studio and celebrate the birthday of his adoptive brother, Erick.
| 6 | "Chapter 6" | 17 May 2019 | 1.17 |
Monchis finds out that the DEA intends to use Yamelí to catch him and sends someone to her to kill. Yamelí begins her training with Jack to become a music producer. Juanjo is reunited with Charly and old grudges come afloat.
| 7 | "Chapter 7" | 20 May 2019 | 1.28 |
Jack organizes a party to officially present Yamelí as Lari Andrade. Erick decides to participate in a musical ring. Yamelí returns to Mexico and finds herself face to face with Charly during the opening of his recording studio.
| 8 | "Chapter 8" | 21 May 2019 | 1.28 |
Yamelí manages to arouse Charly's curiosity and is willing to show him with a concert that she is the best talent scout. Monchis makes it clear to Erick that he will not allow him to be a singer, but he looks for a way to return to the singing ring.
| 9 | "Chapter 9" | 22 May 2019 | 1.41 |
Yamelí, with the help of Juanjo, prepares the concert between Gente de Zona and Charly Flow. Charly releases a new song without knowing that it was Yamelí who wrote it. Yamelí meets Erick while searching for new talent in the musical ring.
| 10 | "Chapter 10" | 23 May 2019 | 1.22 |
Yamelí plans to investigate more about Erick's life and asks Juanjo to help locate him. Charly accepts that Monchis use the recording studio to launder money. Juanjo confesses to Lari that Yamelí was the woman of his life.
| 11 | "Chapter 11" | 24 May 2019 | 1.18 |
Yamelí fails to try to approach Erick and convince him to record in Luxor. Juanjo refuses to work with Charly and to pressure him he has his entire equipment stolen. Erick tired of the contempt of his family decides to leave his house.
| 12 | "Chapter 12" | 27 May 2019 | 1.24 |
Yamelí and Juanjo begin to work together to launch Cris as the new talent of Luxor. Erick starts the search for his real parents and Monchis tells him that his mother is dead. Charly apologizes to Erick for hurting him.
| 13 | "Chapter 13" | 28 May 2019 | 1.36 |
Yamelí filters an intimate video of Charly with Zaria and Diana has to go out and defend his career. Erick receives an anonymous letter asking him for money in exchange for information about his parents. Zaria decides to sue Charly for Diana's threats.
| 14 | "Chapter 14" | 29 May 2019 | 1.21 |
Charly makes his audience believe that he has a problem with alcohol. Yamelí proposes to Juanjo to set up a recording studio and launch Erick as their first talent. Erick receives an anonymous call telling him that he was stolen as a baby.
| 15 | "Chapter 15" | 30 May 2019 | 1.39 |
Rizzo carries out a police operation to catch Monchis and Charly is wounded. Yamelí approaches Vanessa to support her in her family problems. Erick discovers that his mother's name was Yamelí.
| 16 | "Chapter 16" | 31 May 2019 | 1.17 |
Yamelí earns Diana's trust by helping her with the issue of Charly's disappearance. Erick starts looking for information about Yamelí in the neighborhood. Charly finds a microphone inside his office and Yamelí has to divert suspicion.
| 17 | "Chapter 17" | 3 June 2019 | 1.30 |
Yamelí and Rizzo try to erase the videos from the security cameras of Luxor, but the situation is complicated when Axel takes a backup. Vanessa gives Erick the money he needs to discover the truth about his parents.
| 18 | "Chapter 18" | 4 June 2019 | 1.06 |
Charly discovers that the security videos were deleted and accuses Axel of being a snitch. Toño kills Carrancho before he gives Erick information about his parents. Monchis imposes his will and abuses Ligia.
| 19 | "Chapter 19" | 5 June 2019 | 1.19 |
Diana, driven by Charly's humiliation, accepts Alberto's proposal to resume her modeling career. Vanessa has a car accident for driving drugged. To avoid being discovered, Yamelí makes Charly believe that she admires him.
| 20 | "Chapter 20" | 6 June 2019 | 1.28 |
Jack asks Yamelí to desist from her revenge before she loses control of how she feels about Charly. Yamelí takes advantage of the consequences of Vanessa's accident to put Silvana's parents against Charly.
| 21 | "Chapter 21" | 7 June 2019 | 1.00 |
Monchis hits Erick. Silvana's father blames Vanessa for her daughter's accident in the media. Juanjo begins to suspect that Lari is not who she says she is. Yamelí prevents Vanessa from committing suicide in front of Charly and Diana.
| 22 | "Chapter 22" | 10 June 2019 | 1.20 |
Juanjo begins to investigate Lari's true identity. Rizzo asks Yamelí to manipulate Erick to reconcile with Monchis. Yamelí gives Erick a cell phone tapped by the DEA.
| 23 | "Chapter 23" | 11 June 2019 | 1.23 |
Lari confesses to Juanjo that she is Yamelí and tells him about her deal with the DEA. Erick and Lidia decide to leave their house without knowing that the DEA and Monchis are following them. Charly asks Axel to spy on Yamelí.
| 24 | "Chapter 24" | 12 June 2019 | 1.21 |
Yamelí explains to Juanjo the reasons why she seeks revenge on Charly. Charly, Diana and Vanessa begin to take family therapy. Juanjo does not agree with Yamelí's decisions about Erick's career.
| 25 | "Chapter 25" | 13 June 2019 | N/A |
Juanjo tells Yamelí that he is willing to support her in her mission to destroy Charly. Yamelí gets in touch with Zaria to offer her an alliance. Charly confronts Alberto for Vanessa being semi-nude.
| 26 | "Chapter 26" | 14 June 2019 | 1.22 |
Yamelí and Zaria plan to use the conflict between Charly and Alberto to affect him. Juanjo asks El Buhó to help him promote Erick's song on the radio. Yamelí causes Charly to contact Monchis to silence Alberto.
| 27 | "Chapter 27" | 17 June 2019 | 1.32 |
Charly gets upset because Pez Koi's song is more successful than Chris Vega's. Charly confronts Juanjo knowing that he is the musical producer of Pez Koi. Alberto rejects Diana to avoid further problems with Charly.
| 28 | "Chapter 28" | 18 June 2019 | 1.38 |
Vanessa despises Diana by not understanding the reasons why she has decided to separate from Charly. Juanjo organizes a party at his bar to celebrate Erick's success. Zaria broadcasts an interview with Alberto to unmask Charly.
| 29 | "Chapter 29" | 19 June 2019 | 1.21 |
Erick offers a press conference revealing that he is Pez Koi and son of Monchis. Chente gives the DEA the location of Monchis. Charly asks Axel to withdraw all his savings from the bank and Yamelí tells Diana so she will do it before him.
| 30 | "Chapter 30" | 20 June 2019 | 1.32 |
Diana and Charly are willing to fight for the goods that correspond to them. Charly despises Erick and decides not to support him with his music. Monchis mobilizes his people to discover where Erick lives.
| 31 | "Chapter 31" | 21 June 2019 | 1.15 |
Monchis takes Charly and Yamelí to his ranch against their will and demands the money he asked for. The police arrest Vanessa and Ruco for possession of drugs. An employee of Monchis discovers where Erick lives.
| 32 | "Chapter 32" | 24 June 2019 | 1.34 |
Yamelí agrees to spend the night with Charly in order to obtain information about Monchis. Due to Wendy's distrust, Juanjo has to confess that Lari is an agent of the DEA. Monchis discovers that Rizzo and Lari are agents of the DEA.
| 33 | "Chapter 33" | 25 June 2019 | 1.30 |
Yamelí spends the night with Charly and manages to obtain the location of Monchis' ranch. Lidia makes Monchis see all his defects as a husband and he confesses the truth about Adalberto's death.
| 34 | "Chapter 34" | 26 June 2019 | 1.37 |
Monchis orders to kill Yamelí and Charly believing that he has betrayed him. Ruco arrives at the same rehabilitation clinic as Vanessa. Yamelí gives the location of Monchis to Rizzo and he begins to mobilize his agents.
| 35 | "Chapter 35" | 27 June 2019 | 1.36 |
Yamelí manages to survive Toño's attack. Erick participates in a radio contest and meets Irma, the Hurricane. Monchis is cornered by the DEA and Rizzo shoots him while trying to save Lidia. Yamelí confesses to Monchis who she really is.
| 36 | "Chapter 36" | 28 June 2019 | 1.25 |
Rizzo informs Yamelí that she has been released from prison. Lidia confesses to Charly that Monchis killed her father. Lidia and Erick attend the funeral of Monchis. Just before getting married, Juanjo tells Wendy that Yamelí is alive.
| 37 | "Chapter 37" | 1 July 2019 | 1.42 |
Diana asks Charly for another opportunity. Erick can not hide the strong attraction he feels for Irma. Wendy gets drunk during the wedding and tries to reveal the truth about Yamelí. Toño asks Charly to take charge of Monchis' business.
| 38 | "Chapter 38" | 2 July 2019 | 1.26 |
Yamelí and Zaria plan to sabotage Charly's concert and promote Erick's career. Charly offers Erick a concert together, but Juanjo is opposed. Charly contacts Toño to ask for money.
| 39 | "Chapter 39" | 4 July 2019 | 0.91 |
Diana and Yamelí convince Charly to modify the concert and make an exclusive presentation at Juanjo's bar. Ruco is still trying to convince Vanessa that he is willing to change for her and proposes to escape from the rehabilitation center.
| 40 | "Chapter 40" | 5 July 2019 | 1.09 |
Vanessa tries to reach an agreement with Charly and Diana to allow her to live with Ruco. Charly meets Toño to meet Edgar and close one of Monchis' businesses.
| 41 | "Chapter 41" | 8 July 2019 | 1.26 |
Erick gives Vanessa money to help her, but is upset to see that she lives with Ruco. Yamelí gives Diana the contact of a detective to investigate Charly. Juanjo and Yamelí prepare Erick and Charly's concert.
| 42 | "Chapter 42" | 9 July 2019 | 1.16 |
The press conference of Charly and Erick's concert becomes a battle of egos. Charly seeks to sabotage Erick's presentation in order to close the concert. Charly makes peace with Vanessa.
| 43 | "Chapter 43" | 10 July 2019 | 1.11 |
Erick's presentation is a success, but the audience begin to boo Charly. Axel believes that Juanjo is responsible for the attacks on Charly during the concert. Charly is affected by the public's rejection.
| 44 | "Chapter 44" | 11 July 2019 | 1.24 |
Yamelí and Juanjo manage to get Erick to close the concert even though Charly tried to sabotage his last song. Charly blames Juanjo for having wanted to damage his presentation. Yamelí's investigator discovers Charly on a date with Carolina.
| 45 | "Chapter 45" | 12 July 2019 | 1.05 |
Yamelí is upset to see the photos of Charly with Carolina. Vanessa is disappointed in Ruco when she discovers that he continues to sell drugs. Wendy decides to support Yamelí in her revenge against Charly. Diana thinks she can reconcile with Charly.
| 46 | "Chapter 46" | 15 July 2019 | 1.24 |
Yamelí has Restrepo send the photos of Charly and Carolina to Diana, complicating the negotiation of the divorce. Irma hesitates to accept Juanjo's proposal to represent her. Erick asks Irma to be his girlfriend.
| 47 | "Chapter 47" | 16 July 2019 | 1.19 |
Juanjo confesses to Yamelí that he is in love with her and that it was a mistake to marry Wendy. Ruco tries to force Vanessa to return with him, but Sergio defends her. Yamelí tells Charly that the Luxor figures are altered.
| 48 | "Chapter 48" | 17 July 2019 | 1.06 |
Irma decides to sign with Luxor. Charly meets Toño and Edgar to receive money from Monchis' business and Restrepo follows him. Yamelí makes Juanjo see that what he feels is not right. Diana is not willing to give up her part of Luxor.
| 49 | "Chapter 49" | 19 July 2019 | 1.01 |
Erick discovers that his mother is the same Yamelí who was Juanjo's friend. Diana confronts Charly about money laundering and he makes her see that he can use the invoices signed by her against her. Juanjo tells Yamelí that Erick could be her son.
| 50 | "Chapter 50" | 22 July 2019 | 1.12 |
Yamelí cannot believe that her son is still alive and plans to investigate what else Erick knows about his mother. Charly asks Toño to investigate who has been following him. Diana records Charly's confession about money laundering.
| 51 | "Chapter 51" | 23 July 2019 | 1.20 |
Yamelí and Juanjo plan to obtain a sample of Erick's saliva to do a DNA test. Diana does not accept the division of goods and manages Charly to give her seventy percent of Luxor. Erick asks Charly about Yamelí.
| 52 | "Chapter 52" | 24 July 2019 | 1.07 |
Juanjo helps Yamelí with the DNA test, causing Wendy's jealousy. Restrepo confesses to Toño that Diana was the one who hired him to follow Charly. Yamelí makes Charly believe that she received some photos where he is unfaithful and breaks up with him.
| 53 | "Chapter 53" | 25 July 2019 | 1.14 |
Charly tries to clear things up with Yamelí, but she doesn't allow him. The business between Charly and Edgar fails and they lose money. Charly gets violent with Diana when he discovers she's dating Javier.
| 54 | "Chapter 54" | 26 July 2019 | 0.94 |
Yamelí reports Ruco to the police. Charly asks Toño to teach Diana a lesson. Cris Vega asks Juanjo to give him a chance to work with him. Charly pays a fee for Irma's song to play on the radio.
| 55 | "Chapter 55" | 29 July 2019 | 1.10 |
Diana regrets reporting Charly and Yamelí confesses the whole truth to help her do justice. Toño attacks Diana and when he is discovered he shoots her. Charly discovers that Lari is a DEA informant and blames her for the attack on Diana.
| 56 | "Chapter 56" | 30 July 2019 | 1.17 |
Yamelí asks Zaria to help her prove her innocence and records a video where she confesses the truth. Charly tries to convince everyone that Lari was the one who killed Diana, but Erick doubts she is responsible.
| 57 | "Chapter 57" | 31 July 2019 | 1.28 |
Lari is indicated by the police as the main suspect in Diana's death. Yamelí confesses to Erick what happened during the attack in Luxor and he decides to help her hide. Juanjo gives Yamelí the DNA results.
| 58 | "Chapter 58" | 1 August 2019 | 1.22 |
Yamelí confirms that Erick is her son, but prefers not to say anything. Zaria makes Lari's confession public, but Vanessa doesn't believe in her words. Juanjo gives Contreras the information he has about Toño.
| 59 | "Chapter 59" | 2 August 2019 | 1.13 |
In a moment of weakness, Yamelí steals a kiss from Juanjo and confesses that he loves him, but makes it clear that they cannot be together. Contreras pressures Charly to know more about Toño and the divorce process.
| 60 | "Chapter 60" | 5 August 2019 | 1.29 |
Contreras begins to doubt Charly's statements by questioning those involved in Diana's case and confirming that Toño was in Luxor. Juanjo confesses to Wendy that he does not love her and decides to separate from her.
| 61 | "Chapter 61" | 6 August 2019 | 1.26 |
Contreras does not accept the evidence presented by Juanjo. Erick discovers that Irma's father is an alcoholic. Sergio confesses to Vanessa that Yamelí is hiding in his house and she gives her away.
| 62 | "Chapter 62" | 7 August 2019 | 1.26 |
Yamelí surrenders to the police and asks Juanjo to help her prove her innocence. Wendy can't get over her breakup with Juanjo and finds out she's pregnant. Charly prohibits Erick from getting close to him and Vanessa again.
| 63 | "Chapter 63" | 8 August 2019 | 1.21 |
Juanjo gives Contreras a document that reveals Lari's true identity. Wendy confesses to Juanjo that she is pregnant, but he does not agree to get back with her. Charly visits Yamelí in jail to confront her about Diana's death.
| 64 | "Chapter 64" | 9 August 2019 | 1.05 |
Yamelí refuses to be with Juanjo when she learns that Wendy is pregnant. Jack returns to help prove Yamelí's innocence. Erick is jealous to see Irma and Charly kissing, she feels controlled by Erick and breaks up with him.
| 65 | "Chapter 65" | 12 August 2019 | 1.09 |
The police exonerate Yamelí and Charly asks Toño to accelerate the attack against her in jail. Vanessa convinces herself that Lari is innocent and questions Charly about the attack on Diana. Juanjo and Zaria start a campaign to free Yamelí.
| 66 | "Chapter 66" | 13 August 2019 | 1.25 |
Yamelí's life is at risk after being stabbed in jail. Vanessa begins to investigate if there is any connection between Charly and Toño. Charly asks Carolina to help Mora not to confess his participation in money laundering.
| 67 | "Chapter 67" | 15 August 2019 | 1.21 |
Irma, tired of her father's mistreatment, leaves home and looks for Erick to apologize. Axel is disappointed to hear how Charly modified his song. Yamelí decides to reveal her true identity to Charly.
| 68 | "Chapter 68" | 16 August 2019 | 1.26 |
Charly finally finds out about Lari's true identity. Toño puts an ultimatum to Charly to give him the money he needs to leave the country. Vanessa's dinner ends badly when Charly despises Sergio for helping Lari.
| 69 | "Chapter 69" | 19 August 2019 | 1.29 |
Contreras organizes an operation to capture Toño, but it gets complicated and they end up killing him. Yamelí confesses to Erick her past and reveals that she is his mother. Yamelí and Erick decide to tell Lidia the truth about their origin.
| 70 | "Chapter 70" | 20 August 2019 | 1.17 |
Erick confesses to Charly that he is his son, but he prefers not to care. Charly makes a press conference to make believe that Toño extorted him. Zaria and Yamelí publish a video where she tells everything that happened next to Charly.
| 71 | "Chapter 71" | 21 August 2019 | 1.38 |
Axel can't stand Charly's humiliations anymore and hits him. Irma's father drives drunk and runs over Wendy. Marlene blackmails Charly with the information she has on Toño's cell phone.
| 72 | "Chapter 72" | 22 August 2019 | 1.46 |
Charly tired of Marlene's blackmail, kills her and retrieves Toño's cell phone. Erick confronts Chris Vega in a musical duel. Charly tries to silence criticism of his career and denies Yamelí's accusations.
| 73 | "Chapter 73" | 23 August 2019 | 1.18 |
The talents of Luxor and Surround face off in a concert organized by Dj Mike. Mora decides to tell the truth about Luxor's embezzlement. Contreras gets the recording where Charly blames Diana for money laundering.
| 74 | "Chapter 74" | 26 August 2019 | 1.45 |
Charly puts his fans against Yamelí and sues her for defamation. Yamelí gives Zaria the audio where Charly threatens Diana so she can upload it to the internet. Juanjo reaffirms his love for Yamelí and decides to leave Wendy.
| 75 | "Chapter 75" | 27 August 2019 | 1.30 |
Vanessa begins to suspect that Charly had to do with Marlene's death and takes Diana's gun and cell phone from the safe. El Buhó tells Juanjo that Rosalia arranged the contest for Erick to win.
| 76 | "Chapter 76" | 28 August 2019 | 1.27 |
Yamelí makes Jack see that their relationship cannot work. Vanessa decides to deliver Diana's cell phone and the gun to Contreras to find out if Charly is really guilty of Marlene's death. Yamelí and Juanjo spend the night together.
| 77 | "Chapter 77" | 29 August 2019 | 1.20 |
Erick takes Charly on stage and makes a fool of himself. Contreras issues an arrest warrant against Charly. Erick, Irma and Axel are a hit during the Surround concert. Charly kidnaps Yamelí to avoid going to jail.
| 78 | "Chapter 78" | 30 August 2019 | 1.32 |
Charly keeps Yamelí captive in a house far from the city and with Vanessa's help, Contreras discovers his location. Yamelí has the opportunity to end her revenge and threatens to kill Charly.

== Awards and nominations ==
| Year | Award | Category | Nominated | Result |
|---|---|---|---|---|
| 2020 | TVyNovelas Awards | Best Actress | Michelle Renaud | Nominated |
| 2020 | TVyNovelas Awards | Best Actor | Lambda García | Nominated |
| 2020 | TVyNovelas Awards | Best Antagonist Actress | Gloria Stalina | Nominated |
| 2020 | TVyNovelas Awards | Best Co-lead Actor | Polo Morín | Nominated |
| 2020 | TVyNovelas Awards | Best Musical Theme | "Depredador" (Gelo Arango) | Nominated |
