= Caribbean (1953 film) =

1953 film by José Baviera

- Directed by: José Baviera
- Written by: Salvador Abularach
- Produced by: Salvador Abularach
- Cinematography: Jorge Stahl Jr.
- Music by: Salvador Abularach
- Production company: Productora Centro-Americana
- Release date: 9 July 1953
- Countries: Guatemala; Mexico
- Language: Spanish

Caribbean (Spanish: Caribeña) is a 1953 drama film directed by José Baviera. It was a co-production between Mexico and Guatemala.

== Cast ==
- Armando Calvo
- Anabelle Gutiérrez
- José Baviera
- Pedro Vargas
- Rosario Gutiérrez

== Bibliography ==
- María Luisa Amador. Cartelera cinematográfica, 1950–1959. UNAM, 1985.
