= Cárcel de mujeres (TV series) =

- Genre: Telenovela
- Country of origin: Mexico
- Original language: Spanish

Original release
- Network: Telesistema Mexicano
- Release: 1968 – 1968

Cárcel de mujeres, is a 1968 Mexican telenovela produced by Televisa and originally transmitted by Telesistema Mexicano.

== Cast ==
- Erna Martha Bauman
- Narciso Busquets
- Carlos Navarro
- Anabelle Gutiérrez
