= Polo Morín =

Mexican actor and model

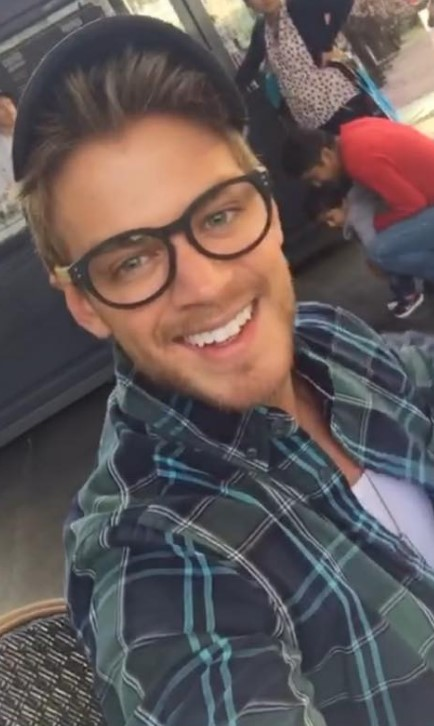
- Morín in 2017
- Born: Leopoldo Morín Garza; November 3, 1990 (age 35); Celaya, Guanajuato, Mexico
- Occupations: Actor, model
- Years active: 2010–present

Leopoldo Morín Garza (born November 3, 1990), known professionally as Polo Morín, is a Mexican actor and model.

== Early life and education ==
Morín was born in Celaya, Guanajuato, Mexico on November 3, 1990. He studied Economics and Business at the Universidad Anáhuac. He studied acting at CasAzul, Casa del Diezmo, and in workshops at Universidad Anáhuac.

== Career ==
Morín began his acting career in 2010 in the series La rosa de Guadalupe. In 2011, he appeared in the episode "Cuidar el amor", playing a murderer named Osvaldo. The following year, he won a prize for best performance at the Bravo Awards 2012. In 2012, he appeared in the MTV series Último año, with Martín Barba, and in 2013 appeared in episode 4 of season 3 of Como dice el dicho, called "Al mal paso". In 2013, he also played the role of a gay character in Gossip Girl: Acapulco. This role attracted much comment at the time. In 2014, he was chosen by Juan Osorio to play "Nando" in the telenovela, Mi corazón es tuyo. In 2014, he made his cinema debut with the film Fragmented, directed by Douglas Elford. In 2015, he was named "Favorite Actor" at the Kids Choice Awards México. In late 2015, he was chosen again by Juan Osorio to participate in the telenovela Sueño de amor, which premiered in Mexico on February 22, 2016. In this telenovela, Morín played a character with diabetes. In 2015, he also recorded the film Sobre tus huellas, which premiered in Mexico in 2016. At the end of 2016, Morin was chosen by Nicandro Díaz González to play the character of Jordi De Ovando in the telenovela El Bienamado.

== Personal life ==
In December 2016, Morín was involved in a scandal about his sexuality, due to photos that a hacker posted on Morín's Facebook. Later, Morin confirmed that the photographs were real and said the following through Facebook Live:

"This has never been about hiding things from them. ... I think what is called personal life should be kept personal. So I wanted to keep it that way".

In the same broadcast, he revealed that he prefers not to label his sexuality, saying that he is just a person who loves. In July 2019, he announced that he had broken up with Lambda García.

== Filmography ==
=== Film ===
Title	Year	Role	Notes
Fragmented	2014	Waiter	Debut film
Sobre tus huellas	2018	Matías	
Escuela de miedo	2020	Danny	Voice; Animated film Spanish version
Escuela para seductores	TBA	Juan	

=== Television roles ===
Title	Year	Role	Notes
La rosa de Guadalupe	2010–11	Osvaldo / Fabián	2 episodes
Último año	2012	Nicolás "Nico" Montes	
Como dice el dicho	2013	Unknown role	Episode: "Al mal paso..."
Gossip Girl: Acapulco	2013	Eric López-Haro	Also starring; 18 episodes
Mi corazón es tuyo	2014–15	Nando Lascuráin	Also starring; 176 episodes
Sueño de amor	2016	Pedro Carmona	Also starring; 131 episodes
El Bienamado	2017	Jordi de Ovando	Also starring; 64 episodes
Tenías que ser tú	2018	Bruno	
La reina soy yo	2019	Erick / Young Charly	
Who Killed Sara?	2021	young José María Lazcano	Recurring role
High Heat	2022	Julián	Main role
Top Chef VIP	2024	Himself	Contestant (season 3)

== Awards and nominations ==
Year	Award	Category	Works	Result
2012	Bravo Awards	Best Performance	La rosa de Guadalupe	Won
2015	Kids Choice Awards México	Favorite Actor	Mi corazón es tuyo	Won
2017	TVyNovelas Awards	Best Young Actor	Sueño de amor	Won
