= Ringo (TV series) =

Mexican telenovela

- Genre: Telenovela
- Based on: Sos mi hombre by Adrián Suar
- Written by: Lucero Suárez; Carmen Sepúlveda; Luis Reynoso; Lorena Salazar; Maykel R. Ponjuan
- Directed by: Claudia Aguilar; Jorge Robles
- Starring: José Ron; Mariana Torres
- Theme music composer: Jorge Domínguez
- Opening theme: "Tú conmigo" by Yahir
- Country of origin: Mexico
- Original language: Spanish
- No. of seasons: 1
- No. of episodes: 82

Production
- Executive producer: Lucero Suárez
- Producer: Ángel Villaverde
- Production locations: Mexico City, Mexico
- Editors: Mauricio Córtes; Norma Ramírez
- Production company: Televisa

Original release
- Network: Las Estrellas
- Release: 21 January – 12 May 2019

Ringo: la pelea de su vida, or simply Ringo is a Mexican telenovela produced by Lucero Suárez that premiered on Las Estrellas on 21 January 2019 and ended on 12 May 2019. It is an adaption on the Argentine telenovela created by Adrián Suar entitled Sos mi hombre. The telenovela stars José Ron, and Mariana Torres. The series revolves around Ringo, the life of a retired boxer and the problems he will face in the face of an economic crisis, couple problems and the custody of his son.

== Plot ==
Ringo is a young man, who has dedicated his life to boxing, and at the peak of his career he loses the national title upon receiving the news of the death of his brother. From that moment, Ringo decides to retire from boxing. Gloria, his wife, leaves him to go live with El Turco, Ringo's main rival in the ring. Gloria's decision leaves Ringo alone in charge of the care of his son Santi. Then, Gloria will return to claim custody of her son, and in that situation, Ringo will have to obtain a job that provides fixed income, to keep custody of his son. He decides to return to boxing with the clear goal to be crowned champion.

== Cast ==
- José Ron as Juan José Ramírez "Ringo"
- Mariana Torres as Julia Garay
- César Évora as Oscar "Oso" Villar
- Jorge Poza as Diego Jáuregui
- Silvia Mariscal as Teresa
- Otto Sirgo as Iván
- Luz Ramos as Rosa
- Óscar Bonfiglio as Manuel
- Pierre Angelo as Damasio
- Arturo Carmona as Alejo Correa
- Alfredo Gatica as Ariel "El Turco" Nasif
- Gabriela Carrillo as Gloria
- Luz Edith Rojas as Brenda
- Edsa Ramírez as Eva
- José Manuel Rincón as Rafael
- Santiago González as Máximo
- Francisco Pizaña as Carrizo
- José Manuel Lechuga as Pepe
- Paco Luna as Guachin
- Patricio de la Garza as Santiago
- Pierre Louis as Javier "Gavilán Machaca"
- Isadora González as Sandra
- Claudia Boyán as Elsa
- Alberto Estrella as Guevara
- Mercedes Vaughan as Marta
- Adalberto Parra as Antunes
- Marlene Kalb as La Zorra Gutiérrez

== Production ==
=== Casting ===
On 31 January 2018, José Ron confirmed his participation in the telenovela through his Instagram account. On 20 February 2018, Mariana Torres was confirmed as co-stars of the production. On 5 March 2018, the Latin Show News website confirmed that César Évora, Luz Ramos, Pierre Louis, Alfredo Gatica, Jorge Poza, Claudia Boyán, Arturo Carmona, Gabriela Carrillo, Silvia Mariscal, Luz Edith Rojas, Isadora González and Gaby Mellado would be part of the main cast.

== Ratings ==
=== Mexico ratings ===
Viewership and ratings per season of Ringo
Season	Episodes	First aired		Last aired		Avg. viewers (millions)
Season	Episodes	Date	Viewers (millions)	Date	Viewers (millions)	Avg. viewers (millions)
1	77 (Note: Should reflect the number of episodes that contribute to the average given in the last column.)	21 January 2019	3.2	12 May 2019	TBD	2.91

=== U.S. ratings ===
Viewership and ratings per season of Ringo
Season	Episodes	First aired		Last aired		Avg. viewers (millions)
Season	Episodes	Date	Viewers (millions)	Date	Viewers (millions)	Avg. viewers (millions)
1	82	2 December 2019	1.69	24 March 2020	2.21	1.62

== Episodes ==
No.	Title	Mexico air date	U.S. air date	Mexico viewers (millions)	U.S. viewers (millions)
1	"El Turco desata la furia de Ringo, ¿lo combatirá?"	21 January 2019	2 December 2019	3.2	1.69
Two years after losing his title to El Turco, Ringo faces a difficult economic situation and the trial for the custody of his son Santiago. However, not everything is bad in his life, because he meets Julia by accident. El Gavilán and El Turco face each other in the ring, but El Turco enrages and sends him to the hospital, Ringo will not rest until he receives revenge.
2	"Ringo no permitirá que Gloria se lleve a Santi"	22 January 2019	3 December 2019	2.9	1.54
Gloria asks Ringo to give Santi to her, but he will only let her see him at home and accompanied. El Turco returns to train at the Delta Boxing Club, despite the fact that El Oso is in disagreement with that decision. Julia begins to feel different things for Ringo, since he is always at the right moment to protect her. Rafael, a new prospect, arrives at the Delta Boxing Club. Due to lack of funds, Julia will lose her office.
3	"Diego termina con Julia"	23 January 2019	4 December 2019	3.1	1.45
Diego ends his relationship with Julia after seeing little interest in their commitment and the affectionate friendship she has with Ringo. Brenda believes that Julia has a relationship with Ringo, so she warns her that she will not allow her to come between them. Gloria takes her son Santi, without Ringo's permission.
4	"Ringo y Julia casi se besan"	24 January 2019	5 December 2019	2.8	1.33
Ringo assures Julia that his life changed since he met her and she seems to be feeling the same. When they are about to kiss an unwelcome situation interrupts them. Ringo accepts the fight against El Turco, but El Oso does not want Ringo’s personal problems to be solved in the ring.
5	"Brenda se lleva a Santi y éste se pierde"	25 January 2019	6 December 2019	3.0	1.37
Ringo has his first fight after retirement. In order to get closer to Ringo, Brenda takes Santi to the fight. Her plan does not go as planned, since Santi disappears from the arena.
6	"Ringo tendrá que compartir la custodia de Santi"	28 January 2019	9 December 2019	2.9	1.34
After the disappearance of Santi, the judge orders the shared custody of the child, Ringo is afraid of losing him forever. Santi does not want to be near his mother, and he demands that Ringo fight to be with him. Brenda does not support that Ringo does not forgive her for taking Santi without permission.
7	"Diego le exige a Julia alejarse de Ringo"	29 January 2019	10 December 2019	2.9	1.35
Brenda explodes in jealousy against Julia, since Ringo shows a total interest in her. Diego begins to realize the situation, so he threatens Julia with ending their commitment if she does not end her friendship with Ringo. Rosa faints in the ring. Julia complains to Augusto Llorente for attacking Rosita's health and is disappointed with Iván and Diego for supporting him.
8	"Llorente manda a matar a Julia"	30 January 2019	11 December 2019	2.8	1.52
Julia will do everything to close Llorente's factory, but he orders for her to get run over. Julia is rescued by Ringo, but Rosa ends up injured. The press conference is held to announce the fight between Ringo and El Turco.
9	"El Oso descubre que Rafael es su hijo"	31 January 2019	12 December 2019	2.7	1.45
After many attempts and in the least expected way, El Oso learns that Rafael is his son. He confronts Sandra for keeping the secret for so many years. Ringo begins his plan to conquer Julia.
10	"Ringo y Diego pelean en el ring"	1 February 2019	16 December 2019	2.7	1.56
Ringo teaches Julia to box, but Diego bursts out of jealousy and challenges Ringo to a fight in the ring. Ringo does not want to hurt him, but he does not hold back against his provocations.
11	"Gloria besa a Ringo a la fuerza; Julia los cacha"	4 February 2019	17 December 2019	2.6	1.55
Gloria assures Ringo that El Turco does not compare to him, so she kisses him by force and Julia sees them. Rosa is threatened by an anonymous person.
12	"Julia y Diego celebran su despedida de solteros"	5 February 2019	18 December 2019	2.8	1.46
While El Turco organizes Diego's bachelor party, Brenda plans everything for Julia in order to separate her from Ringo. Santi's custody trial is getting more and more complicated, and he increasingly loses faith in his father. Julia's drinks too much alcohol at her bachelorette party. At the end of the night she meets Ringo and confesses everything that he makes her feel.
13	"Julia cancela su compromiso con Diego"	6 February 2019	19 December 2019	2.4	1.43
Ringo catches Diego and Guadalupe kissing. Rosa advises Julia not to marry a man she is not in love with. After accepting that she is in love with Ringo, Julia decides to cancel her wedding with Diego. He exploits knowing her decision and swears revenge on Ringo.
14	"Ringo es detenido por golpear a Gloria"	7 February 2019	20 December 2019	2.9	1.40
Gloria, Diego and El Turco plan to destroy Ringo in order for him to lose custody of Santi. Gloria drugs Ringo and accuses him of having beaten her. Ringo is arrested by the police and loses Julia's trust. Brenda has a strange obsession with fire and her therapist discovers it.
15	"Ringo pierde la custodia de Santi"	8 February 2019	20 December 2019	2.9	1.40
The judge dictates that Gloria keep the custody of Santi. Santi rejects Ringo for not fulfilling the promise he made. Julia asks Diego to get married as planned.
16	"Cancelan la pelea de Ringo vs. El Turco"	11 February 2019	23 December 2019	2.5	1.24
Ringo's fight against El Turco is suspended due to the Ringo’s scandal, unless Rosa faces Zorra Gutiérrez. Julia confesses to Ringo that she will resume her wedding plans with Diego. But despite having broken his heart, Ringo does not give up and will fight for Julia's love. Eva tells Alejo what she feels for him.
17	"Ringo está perdidamente enamorado de Julia"	12 February 2019	23 December 2019	2.6	1.24
Ringo confesses to Julia what he feels for her and assures her that he will fight for her love. Rosita listens by mistake that her debut fight is fixed and demands an explanation from Oso. Santi forgives Ringo, after promising that they will be together again.
18	"Ringo hará justicia contra Gloria"	13 February 2019	25 December 2019	2.9	1.09
Ringo discovers that Gloria, Diego and El Turco planned everything to take away his son Santi, so now he will make them pay for their crime. Brenda explodes with jealousy and causes a fire at Julia and Diego's house. El Oso explains the reasons why he agreed to put Rosa to fight and she agrees to lose against La Zorra in order to help Ringo.
19	"Julia se casa con Diego"	14 February 2019	25 December 2019	2.6	1.09
Although Ringo comes to stop the wedding, Julia agrees to be Diego's wife. Teresa asks Ringo to forget Julia, because he has arrived late in her life.
20	"Julia le pide a Ringo que se aleje de su vida"	15 February 2019	26 December 2019	2.7	1.50
Julia wants Ringo to resign, but Ringo assures her that he will stay as guard of her house even if she does not like it. Ringo warns Gloria that he will not stop until he demonstrates that she, El Turco and Diego planned to take Santi away. Gloria is desperate, since she can not find the way for Santi to accept her in his life. Invaded by jealousy, El Turco threatens Gloria after finding out that she returned to look for Ringo.
21	"Gloria le pide perdón a Ringo"	18 February 2019	26 December 2019	2.9	1.50
Gloria can no longer resist the pressure and confesses to Ringo that she drugged him with the help of Diego and El Turco and begs him to forgive her for what she did. Although he has no hard evidence, Ringo will do everything possible to prove it to the judge. Diego receives comments from people who claim to have seen Brenda near his house on the day of the fire. During a night of passion, Brenda confuses Alejo with Ringo.
22	"Diego le pide una prueba de amor a Julia"	19 February 2019	27 December 2019	2.8	1.51
After trying to help one of her patients, Julia was about to be beaten by the patient’s husband, but Ringo arrives at the right time to save her life. Diego is fed up with the friendship of Julia and Ringo, so he asks his wife that if she really loves him, she will stay away from Ringo forever. Ringo hits El Turco at the weigh-in ceremony, so, unless he is offered an apology of several million pesos, Antúnez will cancel the fight.
23	"Ringo y El Turco se enfrentan en el ring, ¿quién ganará?"	20 February 2019	27 December 2019	3.0	1.51
Ringo's fight against El Turco has arrived. And although Ringo is hurt, he will draw strength thanks to Julia's support. Diego confirms his suspicion that Brenda is guilty of setting his house on fire.
24	"Ringo pierde la pelea contra El Turco"	21 February 2019	30 December 2019	3.1	1.69
Although Ringo gave it all, El Turco is declared the winner because of the bought referee. Ringo feels like a loser.
25	"Ringo esperará a Julia el tiempo que sea necesario"	22 February 2019	1 January 2020	2.9	1.45
Ringo has won the support of the people after the fight against El Turco. Ringo is still trying to conquer Julia and, although she resists, assures her that he will not get tired until they are together. Rosa can not hide what she feels anymore and confesses her love to El Oso.
26	"Julia y Eva se infiltran en la fábrica de Llorente"	25 February 2019	2 January 2020	3.0	1.76
Julia and Eva enter Llorente's factory with the help of Rosa to get evidence against him, but El Oso and Wachin ruin their plan and all are stopped by the police. To pay off his debt, Alejo will have to fight in clandestine fights.
27	"Rubén se quiere llevar lejos a Rosa"	26 February 2019	3 January 2020	3.2	1.71
Rubén, Rosa's husband, has left prison to find his wife and take her back to his town. Julia warns Iván that if she discovers that he is Llorente's partner, she will never forgive him.
28	"Brenda amenaza a Julia y a Ringo"	27 February 2019	6 January 2020	2.8	1.72
Brenda records Ringo and Julia dancing romantically, and threatens to send the video to Diego in exchange for them to do what she asks. Gloria makes El Turco leave after finding out that he has been unfaithful in one of his drunkenness.
29	"Diego quiere refundir a Brenda en prisión"	28 February 2019	7 January 2020	3.0	1.71
Diego wants Brenda to pay for the fire in his house, so he asks a lawyer to help put her in jail. Julia can not contain herself anymore and unexpectedly kisses Ringo. El Oso manages to get Rubén to leave Rosa alone, but he threatens to take her daughter. Brenda sows discord between Alejo and Ringo, which causes a break in their friendship.
30	"Diego manda golpear a Ringo"	1 March 2019	8 January 2020	2.7	1.68
Diego explodes when he discovers Julia dancing with Ringo, but El Turco stops him and advises him that it is better to seek revenge. Alejo does not listen to reasons and may fall low in clandestine fights. Diego hires a man to give a lesson to Ringo.
31	"Diego desenmascara a Brenda con Julia"	4 February 2019	9 January 2020	2.8	1.73
Diego demands that Brenda pay for what she did, so he confesses to Julia that it was Brenda who burned the house. Diego seeks to hurt Brenda, but Ringo saves her life.
32	"Brenda le declara su odio a Julia"	5 March 2019	10 January 2020	3.2	1.50
Julia looks for Brenda to know the truth. Feeling pressured, Brenda confesses to Julia that she burned her house because she hates her and can not stand that everyone prefers her. El Oso risked his life so that Rubén definitively leaves Rosa's life. Ringo recognizes the guy who attacked him when he meets Diego.
33	"Julia se escapa con Ringo"	6 March 2019	13 January 2020	2.9	1.74
After El Turco left production of a commercial, Julia proposes Ringo to take his place and begin to increase his fame. Ringo asks Julia to go to Tepoztlán for the weekend. Diego suspects that Julia is up to something and follows her until he discovers the truth of her deception. El Oso confronts José Manuel Figueroa for having stolen the lyrics of his songs.
34	"Diego logra separar a Ringo y Julia"	7 March 2019	14 January 2020	3.1	1.83
Diego poisons Iván and orders to assault the Garay house. Ringo and Julia arrive in time to save her family, but she feels guilty for having escaped and decides to get away from Ringo.
35	"Julia le pide a Ringo que se aleje de su vida"	8 March 2019	15 January 2020	2.9	1.63
To save her marriage, Julia asks Ringo to go to work at the factory and that way she will not see him again. El Turco informs Santi that he will take him to live in the United States. Ringo and Alejo suspect that Diego is the one behind the assault on the Garay house, but they do not have proof to prove it. Rosa says she will not let herself be beaten by La Zorra, after she is insulted.
36	"Ringo y Julia se bañan juntos"	11 March 2019	16 January 2020	2.8	1.72
Ringo confesses to Julia that he loves her, but also tells her that he does not understand her and that she only plays with his feelings. Julia helps Ringo to lower his drunkenness and end up together in the shower. Rosa says she has not gotten that far to get to the ring to lose.
37	"Rosa pierde al propósito contra La Zorra"	12 March 2019	17 January 2020	3.1	1.55
Rosa shows La Zorra that she is stronger in boxing, but she lets herself be won in the third round to avoid problems for El Oso. Ringo tells Julia that she was wrong to have left him.
38	"Ringo pelea en una lucha clandestina"	13 March 2019	20 January 2020	2.8	1.69
Ringo and El Oso want to prevent Alejo from fighting in a clandestine place, but, to get out of there, Ringo will have to fight in the octagon. During an impromptu dinner in the candlelight, Eva and Máximo kiss.
39	"Julia descubre que Diego y Guadalupe son amantes"	14 March 2019	21 January 2020	3.1	1.67
Guadalupe speaks to Diego to meet and spend the night, but Julia hears her husband's call. Rafael confronts Alejo for having slept with La Zorra. Ringo finds the assailants that Diego hired and with the help of Alejo manages to stop them and deliver them to the authorities.
40	"El Oso le pide matrimonio a Rosa"	15 March 2019	22 January 2020	3.2	1.65
El Oso organizes a dinner for Rosa and her family to ask for the hand of the woman he loves, but she shocks everyone with her reaction. Julia discovers Diego's infidelities and does not think to kick him out from home. Days later, she can not contain her desire and kisses Ringo.
41	"Ringo imagina su vida al lado de Julia"	18 March 2019	23 January 2020	3.1	1.55
Ringo tells Julia that, if they were together, she would support him in his boxing, they would have five children and they would be very happy. Armina presents herself with her son, El Turco. Although Armina tells him that she never wanted to leave him, Gloria wants to open his eyes and tells him that she is an imposter. Iván proposes Ringo to open his own security agency. El Oso is surprised of how Rafael fights when holding a fight with Carrizo.
42	"El Delta Club es clausurado"	19 March 2019	24 January 2020	2.7	1.71
Antúnez fulfills his revenge and, due to his fault, El Delta is closed, in addition to which El Oso is disqualified as a coach. Diego does not know how to get Julia to forgive his infidelities, so he feigns illness and fainting to keep her by his side.
43	"¿Dónde está Alejo?"	20 March 2019	27 January 2020	2.7	1.63
Alejo did not pay attention to the alerts of Ringo and the people who appreciate him. Now he is involved in problems with the owners of the clandestine fights and is kidnapped. All of the Delta Boxing Club and people of his office will come together to find him. Guido Guevara shows up at the Delta Boxing Club, he agrees to train Ringo.
44	"Julia le pide el divorcio a Diego"	21 March 2019	28 January 2020	2.8	1.58
Julia braces herself and asks Diego to leave the house and give her a divorce, Ringo celebrates this incredible news. Alejo manages to escape from the place where he was kidnapped before the police and Ringo found him. Ringo reconciles with Santi and clarifies that he would not threaten anyone in his school.
45	"Gloria se lleva a Santi a EU"	22 March 2019	29 January 2020	2.8	1.63
Gloria tricks Santi in order to travel to the United States and thus separate him forever from Ringo. The tiebreaker fight between Ringo and El Turco takes place. Ringo shows a great superiority against El Turco, but his team looks for alternatives and traps to prevent him from falling to the canvas.
46	"Ringo le gana al Turco, pero le roban a Santi"	25 March 2019	30 January 2020	3.2	1.70
Ringo finally defeats El Turco in the ring and regains the title of champion, but he and Gloria take Santi to the United States forever. La Zorra proposes to Rosa that they face each other again in a clean fight.
47	"Brenda y Alejo... ¿se van a casar?"	26 March 2019	31 January 2020	3.1	1.50
Alejo agrees to marry Brenda, but when she tells the news to her loved ones, nobody believes her. Ringo communicates with Gloria from Diego's phone to demand that she return Santi. Police investigations point to a relationship between Diego and Mancuso. Ringo and Julia try to approach the US ambassador to ask for help, but Ringo is mistaken for a criminal and is arrested.
48	"Ringo ya sabe dónde está Santi"	27 March 2019	3 February 2020	3.3	1.61
Thanks to Santi, Ringo discovers the whereabouts of his son and, together with Julia, he will go to the United States to rescue him. With compelling evidence against him, El Oso will pressure Antunez to speed up the payment. Ringo is glad that Alejo wants to be a boxer and train with him.
49	"Brenda pierde la razón"	28 March 2019	4 February 2020	3.1	1.41
Diego wants to prevent Julia from traveling with Ringo in the search for Santi, so he decides to burn her passport in a way that everyone believes it was Brenda. After arguing with Julia, Brenda begins to see her deceased mom and the people accusing her of being a pyromaniac and a liar.
50	"Ringo por fin encuentra al Turco"	29 March 2019	5 February 2020	2.9	1.72
Ringo is well received by compatriots in the United States, who help him find the whereabouts of El Turco. This brings him even closer to Santi. Alejo confirms to Iván that he loves Brenda and that this is the main reason to want to marry her.
51	"El rescate de Santi"	1 April 2019	6 February 2020	3.0	1.60
Ringo discovers Santi's whereabouts and together they flee from El Turco to return to Mexico. Iván discovers large amounts of money leakage, so he asks Sandra to look for evidence among Diego's files.
52	"El Oso graba su primer video musical"	2 April 2019	7 February 2020	2.8	1.45
El Oso enters a supposed musical contest and with the help of his friends he makes the video clip of his song "Ahora no". Gloria abandons El Turco and returns to Mexico. Diego manipulates Brenda to suspend her medical treatment and to go in search of Ringo.
53	"Ringo le hace una propuesta indecorosa a Julia"	3 April 2019	10 February 2020	3.0	1.66
Ringo asks Julia to spend the whole night together. Brenda thinks about the suicide after Alejo broke his commitment to her. In one of his manipulations towards Brenda, Diego urges her to kill Ringo.
54	"Ringo y Alejo pelean por culpa de Brenda"	4 April 2019	11 February 2020	2.9	1.75
Alejo believes all of Brenda's lies and explodes against Ringo. He looks for Ringo to put him in his place, but Ringo also reacts violently; they end their friendship. Gloria does not know how to mend her mistake and asks Ringo for forgiveness for taking Santi. He puts some conditions to her so that she can see Santi. Iván proposes to Ringo to manage his career and give him international exposure.
55	"Ringo y Julia se van de fin de semana"	5 April 2019	12 February 2020	3.2	1.73
Ringo warns El Oso that he will go for the world title, to which he responds that sooner or later he would separate from him. Gloria proposes to Ringo that they return to be a family, because she has never stopped loving him. Ringo and Julia escape from the city to spend a weekend together, with Santi.
56	"Gloria y El Turco terminan"	8 April 2019	13 February 2020	3.0	1.53
El Turco confronts Gloria for having left him in the United States and swears he misses her, but Gloria assures him that their relationship is over. Rosa puts La Zorra in her place after finding out that she has stolen her money. Brenda is allied with Gloria to separate Ringo and Julia.
57	"Ringo y Julia hacen el amor"	9 April 2019	14 February 2020	2.9	1.42
Julia agrees to spend the night with Ringo and finally they give in to passion. Ringo assaults Diego and tells him that he will regret it. Iván reveals to Diego that he has changed the passwords, so he does not steal from him anymore.
58	"El secuestro de Iván"	10 April 2019	17 February 2020	3.0	1.66
Diego orders to kidnap Ivan to prevent him from reporting him for fraud. Ringo suspects of Diego. El Turco learns that Gloria lives at Ringo's house and that she seeks to take away all his fortune.
59	"Diego asesina a Iván a sangre fría"	11 April 2019	18 February 2020	2.9	1.57
Diego's plan is still underway to blame Ringo for Iván's kidnapping, and both go to the rescue of the latter. Diego shoots Iván and ends his life.
60	"Julia le pide a Ringo que la cuide para siempre"	12 April 2019	19 February 2020	2.7	1.72
The investigations into the murder of Iván point to Ringo having a relation in his death. Despite Diego's intrigues, Julia is sure of Ringo's innocence and wants him to take care of her and protect her for life. El Oso asks Guevara to train his student, Alejo.
61	"Julia impide que Ringo sea detenido"	15 April 2019	21 February 2020	2.8	1.55
To prevent the police from taking Ringo as the main suspect in Iván's kidnapping, Julia confesses that they spent the night together. Gloria confesses to Máximo all her misdeeds.
62	"Diego secuestra a Ringo"	16 April 2019	24 February 2020	2.9	1.64
Diego builds the perfect quarter to blame Ringo for Iván's death. He makes it clear that he will do everything possible to leave him as guilty in front of the Garay. Rosa discovers El Oso, who holds a conversation of great confidence with Susana.
63	"Ringo duda del amor de Julia"	17 April 2019	25 February 2020	2.7	1.62
Julia believes that ever since she met Ringo her life has been filled with problems, so she decides to fire him. Ringo loses patience with Julia's distrust and wonders if she really loves him. Since Rosa finds El Oso and Susana too close together, she decides to return to her town.
64	"Diego planea arruinar a Julia"	18 April 2019	26 February 2020	N/A	1.64
Although Brenda does not agree with Iván's last will, Ringo explains to Julia that her father left him in charge of her safety because he does not trust Diego. Diego asks Julia to sign a document to rescue Iván's company. Rosa finds a baby and El Turco becomes immediately attached to him, but soon the boy disappears.
65	"Ringo culpa a Diego de la desaparición de Santi"	19 April 2019	27 February 2020	N/A	1.71
Gloria loses Santi in an oversight and Ringo thinks Diego is to blame for the disappearance of his son. Julia wants to get away from Ringo. El Turco is determined to adopt the baby he took home.
66	"Santi ya apareció"	22 April 2019	28 February 2020	3.0	1.64
Julia doubts even more of Ringo, because he does not prove any of his arguments, besides that she discovers that Gloria lives with him and Ringo hid this from her. Santi appears in Ciudad Victoria, Tamaulipas.
67	"Ringo y Julia toman caminos distintos"	23 April 2019	2 March 2020	2.8	1.64
Despite Julia's great love for Ringo, she has the firm decision to end their relationship and start over. For his friends, El Oso is the main suspect of the accident that La Muñeca Estrada has suffered, because previously he went to argue with her. Diego threatens Sandra with attempting against Rafael, because she accepted a new position in the brewery.
68	"Ringo buscará el título mundial"	24 April 2019	3 March 2020	3.0	1.73
Ringo receives an offer to be an image of a sports brand and to compete internationally. Rosa is informed that she will face La Japonesa. The day of Brenda's wedding with Alejo arrives, and also of Guachín's wedding. Sandra and the assigned lawyer are about to discover the bad management and the theft of Diego on the Garay brewery.
69	"El Turco secuestra a Gloria"	25 April 2019	4 March 2020	3.4	1.75
El Turco believes that Gloria and Ringo have resumed their relationship, so he sleeps her with chloroform with the argument of doing it as an act of love. Brenda is enraged to see that everyone has left her wedding, to go to have fun at Guachín and Luchis' party.
70	"Rosa está en coma"	26 April 2019	5 March 2020	2.6	1.71
Rosa is run over for the second time, and is surgically operated. El Oso is devastated by the uncertainty of not knowing if Rosa will recover. The lawyer Avendaño asks Ringo for help in unmasking the crimes that Diego has committed against the Garay family. Julia asks Diego for a definitive divorce.
71	"Julia descubre el fraude de Diego"	29 April 2019	9 March 2020	3.0	1.60
Sandra informs Julia that Diego committed fraud in the brewery and that, possibly, he was the one who killed her father. Gloria manages to escape El Turco's kidnapping thanks to Ringo. After her accident, Rosa does not remember anyone, neither Guachin, nor El Oso, nor Julia.
72	"Gloria amenaza a Julia"	30 April 2019	10 March 2020	2.9	1.61
Gloria is tired of seeing Julia near Ringo, so she demands that she stay away from him or she will do whatever it takes to get her out of the way. The fight between Rafael and Alejo takes place. Carrizo takes advantage of Rosa's memory loss to make her believe that they are more than friends. Alejo wins the fight against Rafael, but leaves his coaches very dissatisfied with the arrogance and resentment with which he climbed into the ring.
73	"Julia quiere recuperar a Ringo"	1 May 2019	11 March 2020	3.2	1.67
After realizing that she was always wrong, Julia apologizes to Ringo. El Oso goes in search of Rosa, who is with Carrizo, because he has made her believe that she is his wife. Despite Alejo's victory, he does not feel satisfied and realizes that he has lost everything, even a child that never existed. Brenda suffers because things do not go as she would like and her illness aggravates things.
74	"Ringo perdona a Julia y... ¡hacen el amor!"	2 May 2019	12 March 2020	3.0	1.76
Julia asks Ringo for forgiveness again and, although at first he resists, kisses her and they give in to passion. Brenda ends up in prison when she is discovered stealing and submits a policewoman to escape from prison. Ringo has a new student to train.
75	"Santi ya no quiere a Julia"	3 May 2019	13 March 2020	3.1	1.59
Santi wants his parents to be together again, so he will help his mother to let Ringo forget Julia forever. Rosa is unable to box, because she has no strength in her arms.
76	"Diego es el nuevo presidente de la cervecería Garay"	6 May 2019	16 March 2020	3.2	1.78
Brenda signs Diego a power to control her shares in the company, with that he manages to get Julia out of the presidency. Santi asks Gloria to take him with her, because he does not want to be with Ringo and Julia. Rosa receives the terrible news that she will not be able to box again.
77	"Ringo quiere casarse con Julia"	7 May 2019	17 March 2020	3.0	1.72
As Julia is already officially separated from Diego, Ringo wants her to be his wife, so he buys her an engagement ring. Julia manages to speak with Santi and make it clear that her intentions have never been to harm his family, so she regains his trust. Because she will not be able to fight anymore, Rosa returns to her hometown and El Oso can not stop her.
78	"Rosa volverá a dar pelea"	8 May 2019	18 March 2020	2.7	2.00
El Oso looks for Rosa in her hometown to convince her not to give up and, after a long depression, Rosa agrees to give everything to win. Guevara believes that he was discovered the way in which Guachín gets the money he has, so he sends him to prison. Diego will not allow Julia to keep control of the company, so he does everything possible so that Manuel does not give up his shares.
79	"El final de Brenda"	9 May 2019	19 March 2020	N/A	1.88
Everyone mourns the death of Manuel and, because of this, Brenda wants to revoke the power she has given Diego, but he has other plans for her. Guevara learns that he has sent Guachín to prison in an unfair manner.
80	"Brenda está viva"	10 May 2019	20 March 2020	2.4	1.94
Julia, worried about Brenda's location, asks for help from Ringo and Alejo, who find her alive. Gloria receives a proposal to transport drugs hidden in dolls.
81	"Julia por fin le hará pagar a Diego"	12 May 2019	23 March 2020	N/A	1.97
82	"Ringo gana la pelea de su vida"	12 May 2019	24 March 2020	2.21	1.97
Julia receives a video that proves that Diego killed her father, so she will report him to the police so that he receives his punishment. Diego manages to enter Brenda's room to get rid of her. Gloria is arrested at the airport in the United States for drug trafficking. Bruno blackmails Diego, but when they meet to exchange evidence and money, Diego murders him. Diego is cornered by the police and uses Julia as a hostage but Ringo puts a stop to him. Brenda informs Julia that she will be admitted to Dr. Avellaneda's clinic. Diego ends his days in prison, but there he will meet old friends. After so many misunderstandings, Ringo manages to join his life to Julia's, to always be with Santi and to be crowned world champion.

== Awards and nominations ==
Year	Award	Category	Nominated	Result
2020	TVyNovelas Awards	Best Telenovela of the Year	Lucero Suárez	Nominated
2020	TVyNovelas Awards	Best Actress	Mariana Torres	Nominated
2020	TVyNovelas Awards	Best Actor	José Ron	Won
2020	TVyNovelas Awards	Best Antagonist Actress	Luz Edith Rojas	Nominated
2020	TVyNovelas Awards	Best Antagonist Actor	Jorge Poza	Nominated
2020	TVyNovelas Awards	Best Leading Actress	Silvia Mariscal	Nominated
2020	TVyNovelas Awards	Best Leading Actor	César Évora	Nominated
2020	TVyNovelas Awards	Best Co-lead Actress	Luz Ramos	Nominated
2020	TVyNovelas Awards	Best Direction	Claudia Elisa Aguilar and Jorge Robles	Nominated
2020	TVyNovelas Awards	Best Direction of the Cameras	Víctor Soto and Adrián Frutos	Nominated
2020	TVyNovelas Awards	Best Original Story or Adaptation	Carme Sepúlveda, Lucero Suárez, Maykel Ponjuán and Luis Reynoso	Nominated
2020	TVyNovelas Awards	Best Musical Theme	"Tú conmigo" (Yahir)	Nominated
2020	Los favoritos del público	The Most Beautiful Villain	Luz Edith Rojas	Nominated
2020	Los favoritos del público	The Most Handsome Guy	José Ron	Nominated
2020	Los favoritos del público	The Most Beautiful Girl	Luz Edith Rojas	Nominated
2020	Los favoritos del público	The Most Beautiful Smile	José Ron	Nominated
2020	Los favoritos del público	The Most Beautiful Leading Actor	César Évora	Won
2020	Los favoritos del público	Favorite Finale	Lucero Suárez	Nominated
2020	Los favoritos del público	Best Cast	Lucero Suárez	Nominated
