= Los elegidos (TV series) =

2019 Mexican television series

- Genre: Telenovela
- Based on: Los protegidos by Darío Madrona and Ruth García
- Written by: Pablo Aramendi; Nuria Ibáñez; Diego Flores; Chema Solari; Ernesto Anaya
- Directed by: Carlos González Sariñana; Bonnie Cartas
- Starring: Sara Maldonado; Carlos Ferro; Julio Bracho; Carmen Madrid
- Opening theme: "Familia de verdad" by Macarena García
- Original language: Spanish
- No. of seasons: 1
- No. of episodes: 34 (70 produced)

Production
- Executive producer: Andrés Santamaría
- Production locations: Mexico City, Mexico
- Camera setup: Multi-camera
- Production companies: Sony Pictures Television; Televisa

Original release
- Network: Las Estrellas
- Release: 1 July – 16 August 2019

Los elegidos is a Mexican television series produced by Sony Pictures Television and Televisa based on the 2010 Spanish television series created by Darío Madrona and Ruth García, Los protegidos. The series stars Sara Maldonado and Carlos Ferro. The series revolves around a group of people who pretend to be a family with the aim of fleeing from a strange organization that seeks them for the supernatural powers that the kids' possess. It premiered on 1 July 2019 and ended on 16 August 2019.

== Premise ==
The García García family hides two secrets. One is that they are actually not a family and the second is that the children and young people that comprise it have extraordinary abilities. They must hide to protect themselves from the sinister Colonel Morrison, a former US military man who wishes to use their powers for the benefit of his diabolical plans.

== Cast ==
- Sara Maldonado as Jimena García, a psychologist who will help Los elegidos after her daughter is kidnapped.
- Carlos Ferro as Mario García, a man who makes facial composite drawings, although his dream is to be an illustrator of books. He is Carlos's father.
- Julio Bracho as Thomas Morrison "El Coronel"
- Carmen Madrid as Rosa Domínguez
- Arantza Ruíz as Becka
- Macarena García as Sandra García, a teenager from a wealthy family whose power is electricity, which puts her in several problems.
- Erick Cañete as Lucas García, a shy and withdrawn teen whose power is shapeshifting.
- Jason Romo as Felipe García "Cobra", a problematic teen who lives in litigation with his father. His power is invisibility.
- Mario Escalante as Ismael Murillo
- Gerardo Trejoluna as Antonio Domínguez
- Cinthia Vázquez as Nuria
- Clarisa González as Claudia Domínguez
- Maximiliano Uribe as Carlos García, his power is telekinesis, suffers from bullying at school, and loves his father's stories and comics.
- Paola Real as Lucía García, her power is mind-reading and is always listening to classical music to avoid knowing the thoughts of others.
- Cassandra Iturralde as Blanca
- Lukas Urquijo López as Beto
- José Antonio Toledano as Ángel
- Javier Ponce as Leo

== Episodes ==
No.	Title	Original release date
1	"Tenemos que estar unidos"	1 July 2019 (Note: Premiered early online through Las Estrellas website on 28 June 2019.)
With the help of Jimena and Mario, Los Elegidos will live together as a family, but they will have to abide by certain rules to be at peace.
2	"El interrogatorio Domínguez"	2 July 2019
The García García learn more about the preferences of each member of the family to survive the visit of their neighbor.
3	"La misión de Sandra"	3 July 2019
Sandra is desperate to see her sister, so Lucas offers to help her get inside the hospital.
4	"¿Quién se robó el reloj?"	4 July 2019
After being accused of stealing the watch, Cobra will investigate to find the culprit. Lieutenant Murillo finds the García García house.
5	"Fiesta en Villa Dorita"	5 July 2019
Lucas embarks on an adventure to get alcohol for the party that Leo organizes in Villa Dorita.
6	"Rescatando al teniente Murillo"	8 July 2019
While Mario and Lucas conquer the annual festival of family integration, Jimena tries to save Lieutenant Murillo from his enemies.
7	"Dulce como un flan napolitano"	9 July 2019
While Mario and Jimena have to write what they feel for their partner in a workshop to be happy, Sandra will try to rescue her sister.
8	"In vitro"	10 July 2019
Sandra discovers that she was conceived in vitro and her sister Sofía as well. Mario and Jimena have a romantic evening.
9	"El caso Walsh"	11 July 2019
Lieutenant Murillo and Jimena find a man who could be the clue to find Morrison. Lucas has doubts about his sexual preferences.
10	"Elena"	12 July 2019
Elena is hopeless to see Natalia very sick, so she will ask Lucía for help. Mario receives a family intervention.
11	"Baeza, Brandon"	15 July 2019
Mario, Jimena and Lucía plan to deceive agent Baeza to extract information. Cobra suffers a flaw in his powers.
12	"El primer beso"	16 July 2019
Mario and Jimena kiss and spend the night together. Another member of the García García family will receive an unexpected kiss.
13	"El bien común"	17 July 2019
Ghosts haunt the García García family, who will also be discovered by Nuria and Andrés.
14	"Celos"	18 July 2019
Mario and Nuria accidentally kiss and Jimena is enraged upon finding out. Cobra regains his powers.
15	"El secuestro de los García García"	19 July 2019
Nuria and Andrés kidnap Cobra, Sandra, Lucas, Lucia and Carlos to free them from Jimena and Mario, who, in turn, are arrested by the police.
16	"Programa de Paradigmas Paranormales (PPP)"	22 July 2019
Carlitos uses his powers to be a great goalkeeper, but this could get him into trouble.
17	"Feria de ciencias"	23 July 2019
Jairo and Marucia, from the PPP, arrive in Valle Encantado and find paranormal tests at the school. Blanca faces Morrison.
18	"Epidemia"	24 July 2019
Lucas gets sick and, as he escapes from the García García house, he infects his classmates and his brothers and sisters, who will undergo curious transformations.
19	"Atentado contra Morrison"	25 July 2019
Colonel Morrison is stabbed with scissors by one of the residents.
20	"Trabajo sucio"	26 July 2019
Lucas helps Sandra put an end to her relationship with Cobra. With the help of Hugo, the PPP will set Felipe up.
21	"Fenómenos del Internet"	29 July 2019
The PPP publishes a video exposing the powers of the Elegidos, and they become viral. Javier is implanted with a switch to control his abilities.
22	"Mario, el abuelo"	31 July 2019
For trying to save Elena, Mario will be terribly affected. A secret of the PPP will come to light.
23	"Círculo de confianza"	1 August 2019
Morrison tests Becka's loyalty. Inspector Murillo is attacked and Lucas ruins Mario and Jimena's plan to save Carlitos.
24	"Hoyo negro"	2 August 2019
Sandra is captured by Morrison's men and in the laboratory she reunites with Sofía. Jimena and Mario get married.
25	"Línea del tiempo"	5 August 2019
In the laboratory, Sandra and others organize an escape plan. Mario loses custody of Carlitos and Blanca trusts in his visions.
26	"¿Quién es Ramiro Cortés?"	6 August 2019
The true identity of Ramiro Cortés has come to light. The police find Natalia's body and Jimena receives a message from Becka.
27	"Fecha de caducidad"	7 August 2019
Jimena discovers that the elegidos are in danger of death and Cobra, upon finding out, goes into depression. Blanca has a vision of the colonel's end.
28	"Explosión"	8 August 2019
Sergio, Jimena's husband, returns to alter the order of the García García. Cobra discovers the deterioration that he suffers and an accident occurs in Morrison's laboratory.
29	"La caída de Becka"	9 August 2019
Becka assumes control of the laboratory, but the elegidos come together to overthrow her. Jimena makes a decision between Mario and Sergio.
30	"Junio 1915"	12 August 2019
A new elegido arrives in Valle Encantado and Sergio agrees to exchange Blanca for Ángel.
31	"Señal luminosa"	13 August 2019
The plan of Los elegidos to end the laboratory fails, Morrison kidnaps Lucía and someone dies in Valle Encantado.
32	"La muerte de Mario"	14 August 2019
During the attack on the bunker, Mario loses his life, the colonel is killed by Becka and she receives her fair punishment, but everything could change.
33	"Problemas en el paraíso"	15 August 2019
After undergoing a process of empowerment, Sofía increases her abilities and uses them to destroy Los Elegidos. Becka receives a second chance.
34	"Somo Los Elegidos"	16 August 2019

== Awards and nominations ==
Year	Award	Category	Nominated	Result
2020	TVyNovelas Awards	Best Drama Series	Andrés Santamaría	Nominated
2020	TVyNovelas Awards	Best Actress in a Drama Series	Macarena García	Nominated
2020	TVyNovelas Awards	Best Actor in a Drama Series	Carlos Ferro	Nominated
