= 36th TVyNovelas Awards =

2018 Mexican TV awards

- Date: February 18, 2018
- Location: Mexico City, Mexico
- Hosted by: Jacqueline Bracamontes & Inés Gómez Mont

Highlights
- Most awards: Caer en tentación (10)
- Most nominations: Caer en tentación (18)

Television/radio coverage
- Network: Las Estrellas

The 36th TVyNovelas Awards were an academy of special awards to the best soap operas and TV shows. The awards ceremony took place on February 18, 2018. The ceremony was televised in Mexico by Las Estrellas.

Jacqueline Bracamontes and Inés Gómez Mont hosted the ceremony. Caer en tentación won 10 awards, the most for the evening, including Best Telenovela. Other winners Papá a toda madre won 4 awards, Mi marido tiene familia won 2 awards and La doble vida de Estela Carrillo and Me declaro culpable won 1 award each.

== Summary of awards and nominations ==
Telenovela	Nominations	Awards
Caer en tentación	18	10
La doble vida de Estela Carrillo	17	1
Papá a toda madre	13	4
Mi marido tiene familia	13	2
Me declaro culpable	10	1
Enamorándome de Ramón	7	0
Sin tu mirada	7	0
En tierras salvajes	4	0
El Bienamado	1	0
Mi adorable maldición	1	0

== Winners and nominees ==
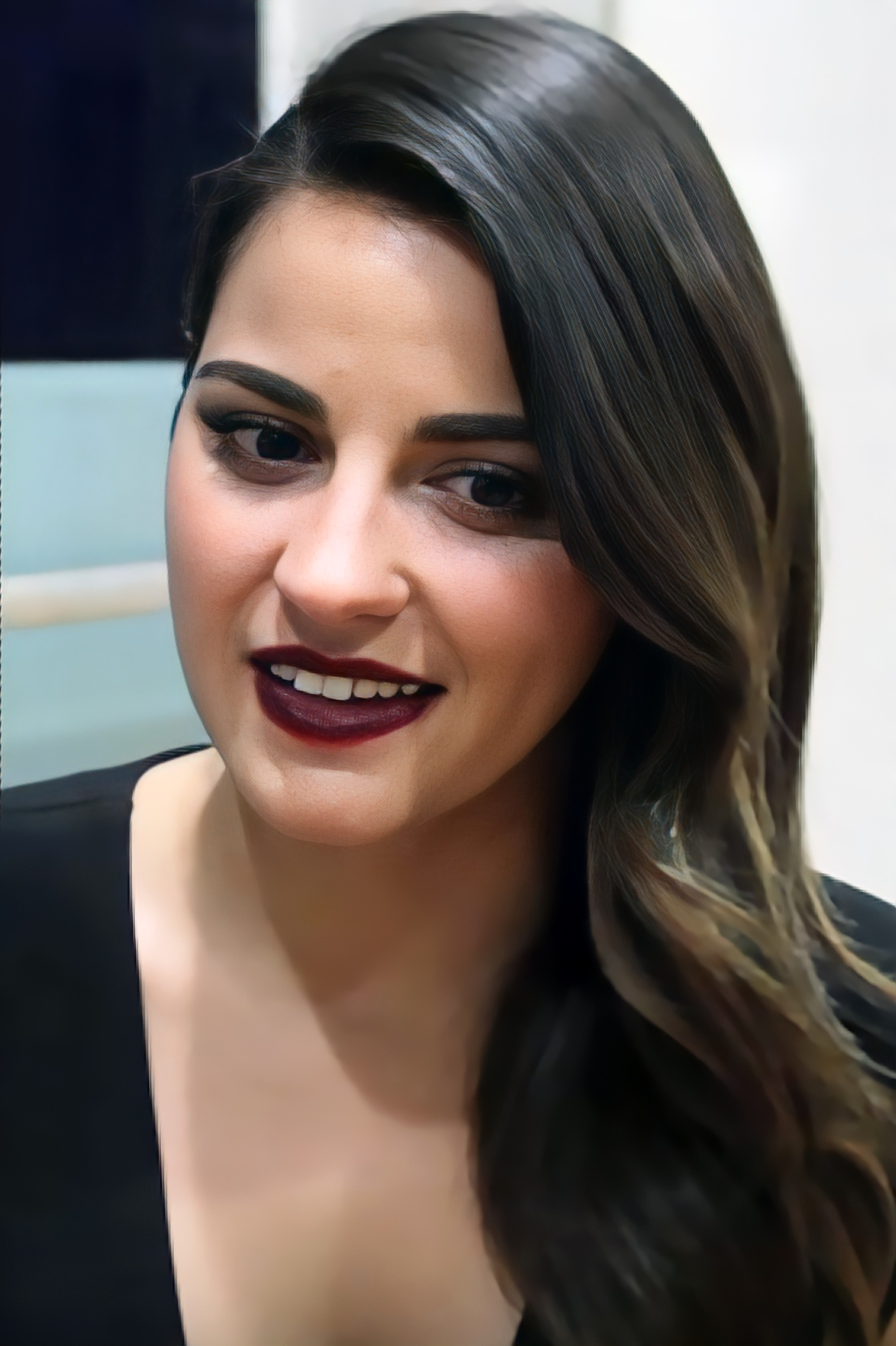
Maite Perroni, winner for Best Actress

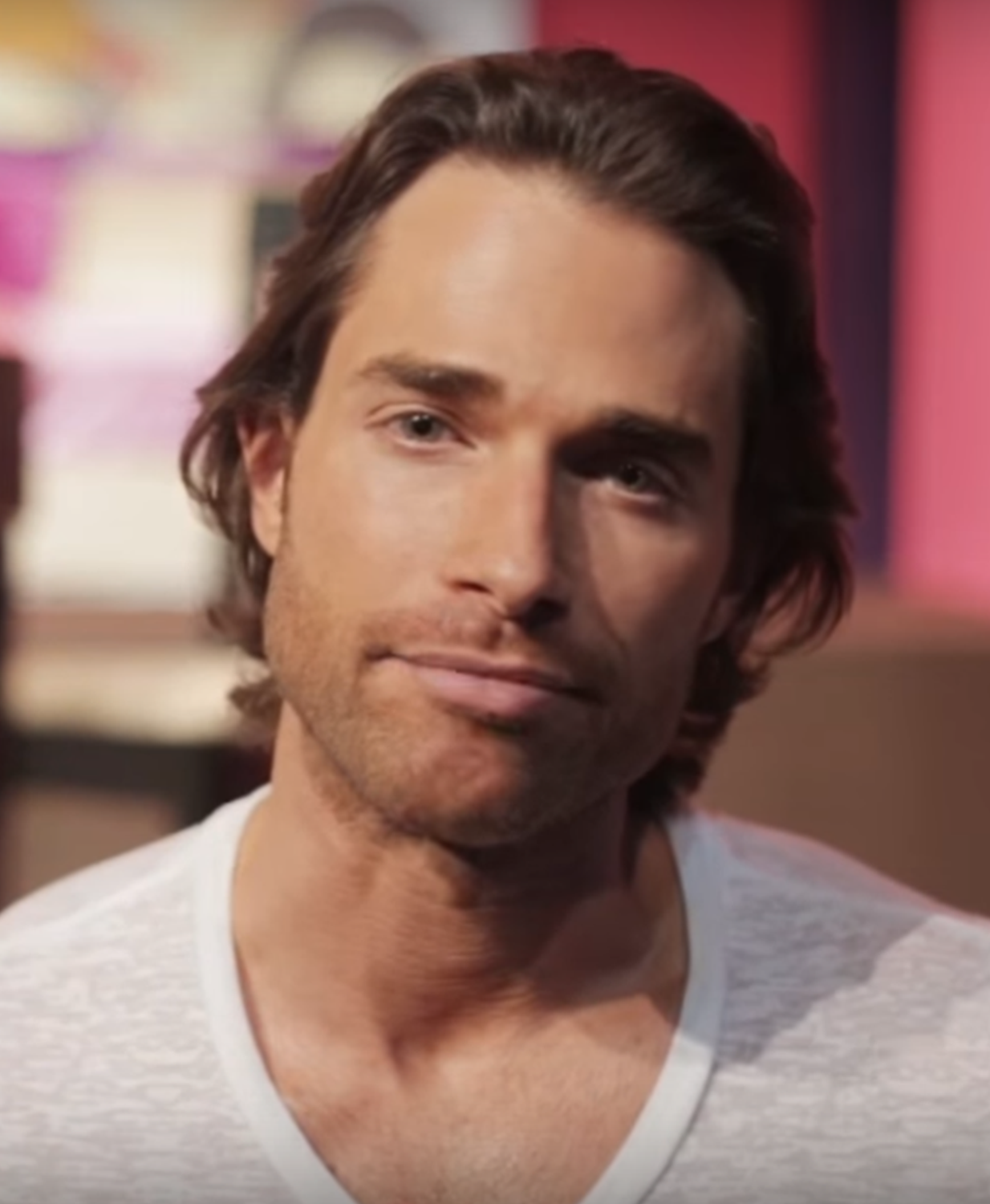
Sebastián Rulli, winner for Best Actor

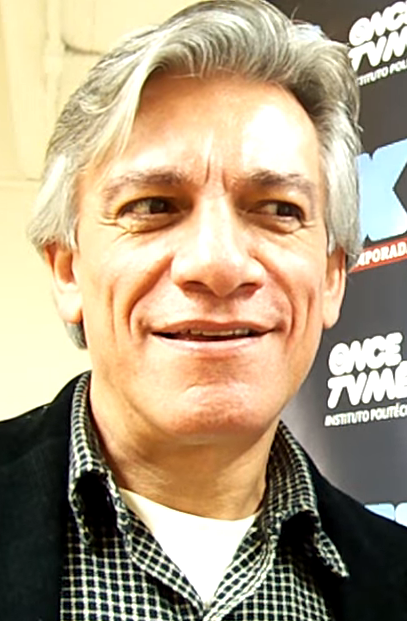
Juan Carlos Barreto, winner for Best Leading Actor

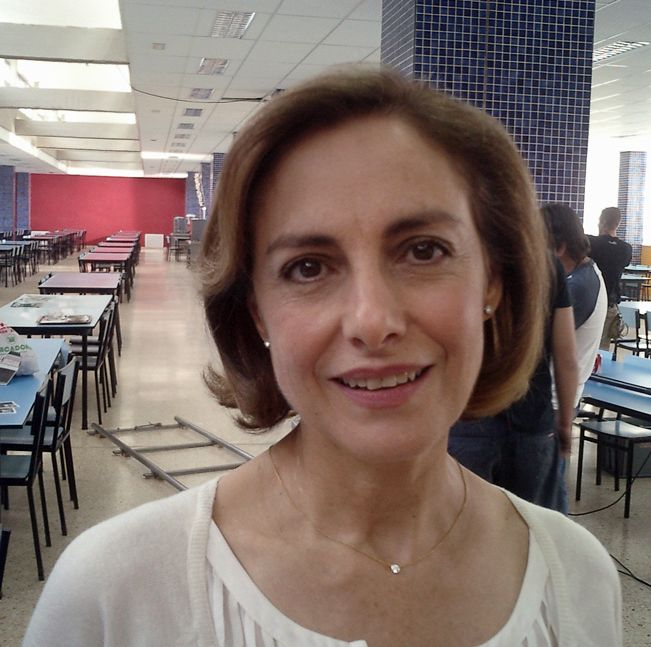
Diana Bracho, winner for Best Co-lead Actress

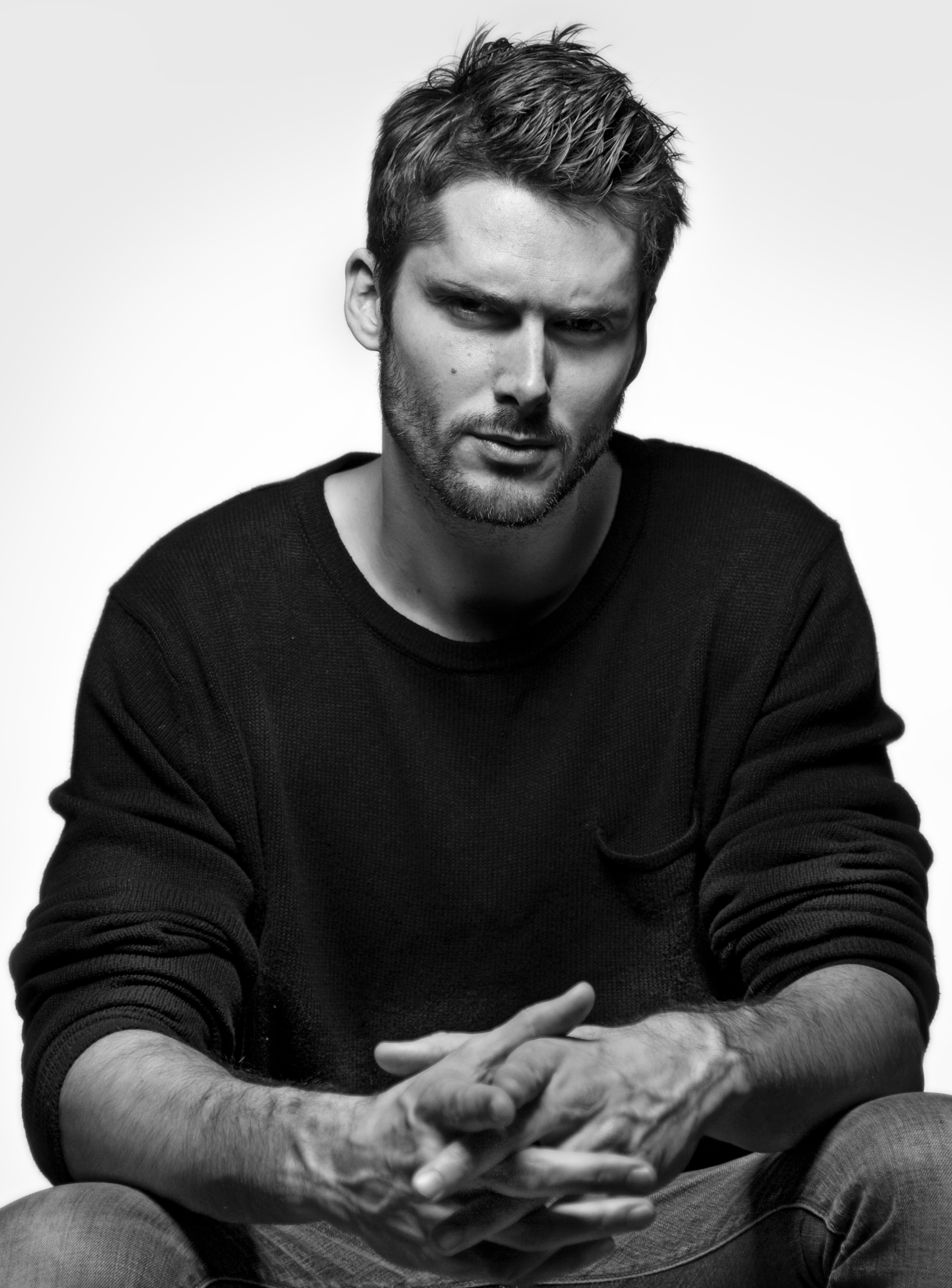
Sergio Mur, winner for Best Supporting Actor

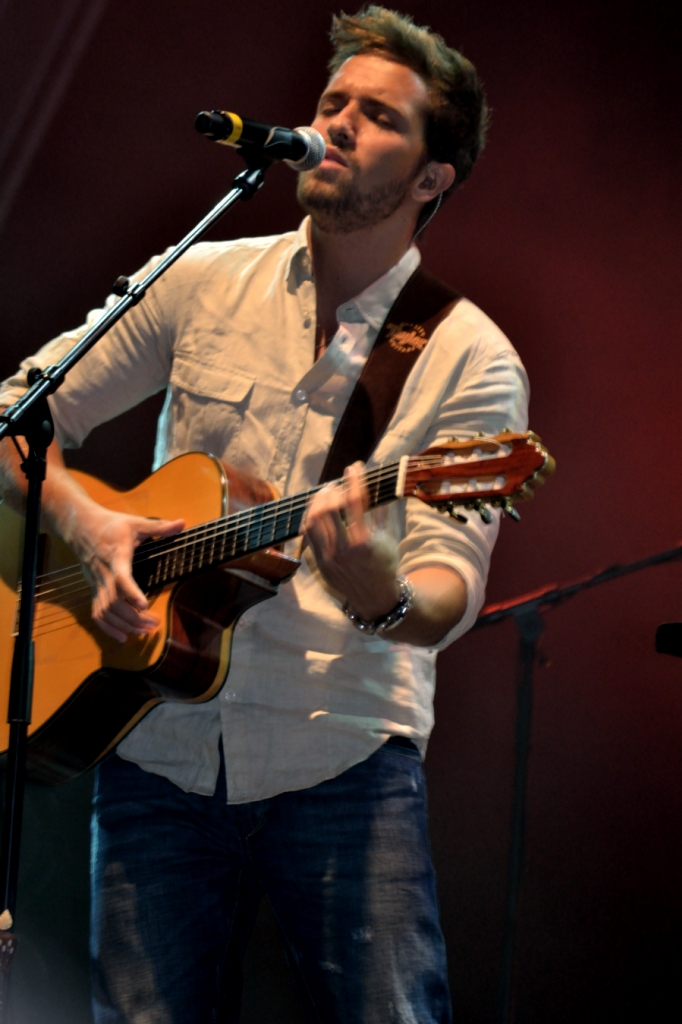
Pablo Alborán, winner for Best Musical Theme

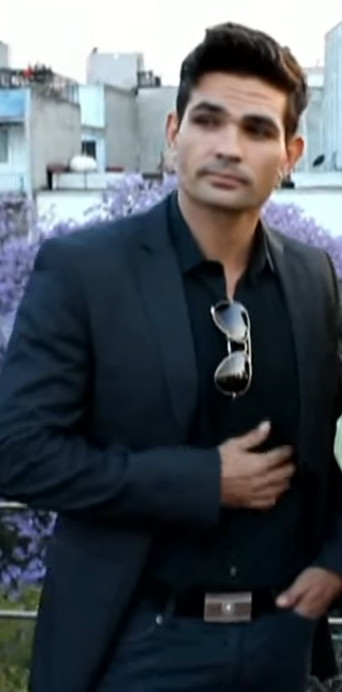
Ferdinando Valencia, winner for Best Actor in a Series

=== Telenovelas ===
Best Telenovela	Best Cast
Caer en tentación; El Bienamado; Enamorándome de Ramón; Me declaro culpable; Mi marido tiene familia; Papá a toda madre	Caer en tentación; La doble vida de Estela Carrillo; Me declaro culpable; Mi marido tiene familia; Papá a toda madre
Best Actress	Best Actor
Maite Perroni – Papá a toda madre; Adriana Louvier – Caer en tentación; Ariadne Díaz – La doble vida de Estela Carrillo; Silvia Navarro – Caer en tentación; Zuria Vega – Mi marido tiene familia	Sebastián Rulli – Papá a toda madre; Daniel Arenas – Mi marido tiene familia; David Zepeda – La doble vida de Estela Carrillo; Gabriel Soto – Caer en tentación; José Ron – Enamorándome de Ramón
Best Antagonist Actress	Best Antagonist Actor
Daniela Castro – Me declaro culpable; África Zavala – La doble vida de Estela Carrillo; Julieta Egurrola – Caer en tentación; Lola Merino – Mi marido tiene familia; Luz Elena González – Enamorándome de Ramón	Danilo Carrera – La doble vida de Estela Carrillo; Alfredo Gatica – Enamorándome de Ramón; Arath de la Torre – Caer en tentación; Eduardo Santamarina – Sin tu mirada; Pedro Moreno – Me declaro culpable
Best Leading Actress	Best Leading Actor
Silvia Pinal – Mi marido tiene familia; Daniela Romo – En tierras salvajes; Julieta Egurrola – Caer en tentación; Raquel Pankowsky – Papá a toda madre; Zaide Silvia Gutiérrez – La doble vida de Estela Carrillo	Juan Carlos Barreto – Papá a toda madre; Adalberto Parra – Caer en tentación; Alejandro Tommasi – La doble vida de Estela Carrillo; Enrique Rocha – Me declaro culpable; José Carlos Ruiz – Mi adorable maldición
Best Co-lead Actress	Best Co-lead Actor
Diana Bracho – Mi marido tiene familia; Claudia Ramírez – Sin tu mirada; Erika Buenfil – La doble vida de Estela Carrillo; Marisol del Olmo – Enamorándome de Ramón; Verónica Jaspeado – Papá a toda madre	Carlos Ferro – Caer en tentación; Adrián Di Monte – La doble vida de Estela Carrillo; Carlos de la Mota – Sin tu mirada; Rafael Inclán – Mi marido tiene familia; Raúl Araiza – Papá a toda madre
Best Supporting Actress	Best Supporting Actor
Julia Urbini – Caer en tentación; Cecilia Toussaint – Sin tu mirada; Michelle González – Papá a toda madre; Olivia Bucio – Mi marido tiene familia; Vanessa Bauche – La doble vida de Estela Carrillo	Sergio Mur – Papá a toda madre; Carlos Valencia – Caer en tentación; Fabián Robles – En tierras salvajes; Marco Méndez – La doble vida de Estela Carrillo; Sergio Reynoso – Sin tu mirada
Best Young Lead Actress	Best Young Lead Actor
Ela Velden – Caer en tentación; Claudia Martín – Enamorándome de Ramón; Fernanda Urdapilleta – Papá a toda madre; Scarlet Gruber – Sin tu mirada; Yany Prado – La doble vida de Estela Carrillo	Germán Bracco – Caer en tentación; Álex Perea – La doble vida de Estela Carrillo; Emmanuel Orenday – Sin tu mirada; Emmanuel Palomares – En tierras salvajes; Juan Diego Covarrubias – Me declaro culpable
Best Musical Theme	Best Original Story or Adaptation
"Saturno" — Pablo Alborán – Caer en tentación; "Estaré contigo" — Marco Antonio Solís – En tierras salvajes; "Me declaro culpable" — Mijares and María José – Me declaro culpable; "Tú eres la razón" — Los Fontana & Angelina – Mi marido tiene familia; "Y me pregunto" — Julión Álvarez – La doble vida de Estela Carrillo	Leonardo Bechini – Caer en tentación; Claudia Velazco and Pedro Armando Rodríguez – La doble vida de Estela Carrillo; Héctor Forero, Pablo Ferrer and Martha Jurado – Mi marido tiene familia; Juan Carlos Alcalá, Rosa Salazar and Fermín Zúñiga – Me declaro culpable; Lucero Suárez, Carmen Sepúlveda, Edwin Valencia and Luis Reynoso – Enamorándome de Ramón
Best Direction	Best Direction of the Cameras
Eric Morales and Juan Pablo Blanco – Caer en tentación; Benjamín Cann and Rodrigo G. H. Zaunbos – La doble vida de Estela Carrillo; Benjamín Cann and Rodrigo G. H. Zaunbos – Papá a toda madre; Héctor Bonilla and Aurelio Ávila – Mi marido tiene familia; Sergio Cataño – Me declaro culpable	Armando Zafra and Luis Rodríguez – Caer en tentación; Alejandro Frutos – Me declaro culpable; Manuel Barajas and Alejandro Álvarez – La doble vida de Estela Carrillo; Manuel Barajas and Alejandro Álvarez – Papá a toda madre; Mauricio Manzano and Gilberto Macín – Mi marido tiene familia

=== Others ===
Best Unit Program	Best Series
La rosa de Guadalupe; Como dice el dicho	Hoy voy a cambiar; Dogma; Érase una vez
Best Actress in a Series	Best Actor in a Series
Mariana Torres – Hoy voy a cambiar; Gabriela Roel – Hoy voy a cambiar; Iliana Fox – Dogma	Ferdinando Valencia – Hoy voy a cambiar; Ari Telch – Hoy voy a cambiar; Daniel Martínez – Dogma; Eugenio Montessoro – Hoy voy a cambiar
Best Comedy Program	Best Entertainment Program
Vecinos; 40 y 20; Mita y mita; Nosotros los guapos; Renta congelada	Hoy; Cuéntamelo ya; El Coque va
Best Pay Television Program	Best Reality Show
Miembros al aire; Está cañón; Hacen y deshacen; MoJoe; Netas divinas	La Voz... México; Bailando por un sueño
