= TVyNovelas Award for Best Actor in a Drama Series =

Mexican television award

- Awarded for: Best performance by an actor in a drama series
- First award: 2017; Diego Olivera; Mujeres de negro
- Currently held by: 2020; Alex Perea; Sin miedo a la verdad

== Winners and nominees ==
=== 2010s ===
Winner	Nominated
35th TVyNovelas Awards
Diego Olivera for Mujeres de negro	Alan Alarcón for Login; Iván Sánchez for Yago; Tenoch Huerta for Blue Demon
36th TVyNovelas Awards
Ferdinando Valencia for Hoy voy a cambiar	Ari Telch for Hoy voy a cambiar; Daniel Martínez for Dogma; Eugenio Montessoro for Hoy voy a cambiar
~~2019~~

=== 2020s ===
Winner	Nominated
38th TVyNovelas Awards
Alex Perea for Sin miedo a la verdad	Carlos Ferro for Los elegidos; Gonzalo Guzmán for Silvia Pinal, frente a ti
