= Na Corda Bamba =

Portuguese telenovela

- "Há segredos que ficam em família" (Portuguese) "There are secrets that stay in family" (English)
- Genre: Melodrama
- Created by: Rui Vilhena
- Developed by: Plural Entertainment
- Directed by: Marcos Schechtman
- Starring: Dalila Carmo; Pepê Rapazot; Margarida Vila-Nova; Maria João Bastos (see more)
- Opening theme: Dançar na Corda Bamba by Clã
- Ending theme: Dançar na Corda Bamba by Clã
- Country of origin: Portugal
- Original language: Portuguese
- No. of seasons: 2
- No. of episodes: 187

Production
- Running time: 55min

Original release
- Network: TVI
- Release: September 15, 2019 – May 15, 2020

Related
- Amar Depois de Amar; Amar Demais

Na Corda Bamba (English: On Thin Ice, literally: On the Tightrope) is a Portuguese telenovela broadcast and produced by TVI. It is written by Rui Vilhena. The telenovela premiered on September 15, 2019 and ended on May 15, 2020. It is recorded between Lisbon and Madeira.

== Plot ==
Desiring the impossible is a dangerous feeling. The path is something mandatory, you have to fight. Despair leads us through fatal shortcuts. But, what if the only way to achieve our dreams is to commit a crime? Would we be able to do it? Like any criminal, Lucia and Pipo believe they have committed the perfect crime. For a long time, they think they are living the dream of a happy family with their three kids until death comes to life. The family album hides ghosts that no one imagines. Sometimes, when you want to erase a crime, you need to commit one. Welcome to the Lobo family.

== Cast ==
Actor	Character	Season	
Actor	Character	1	2
Dalila Carmo	Lúcia Lobo Trindade	Antagonist	Antagonist
Pepê Rapazote	Filipe «Pipo» Trindade	Antagonist	Protagonist
Margarida Vila-Nova	Sara Pimentel	Protagonist	Protagonist
Maria João Bastos	Olívia Galvão	Antagonist	Antagonist
Alexandra Lencastre	Fernanda Lobo	Regular	Regular
António Capelo	Octávio Nogueira	Regular	Regular
Nuno Homem de Sá	Mário Veloso	Regular	Regular
Sofia Grillo	Maria do Carmo Pimentel Nogueira	Regular	Regular
Paula Neves	Leonor Alves	Regular	Regular
São José Correia	Beatriz Vasconcelos Varela	Regular	Regular
Pedro Granger	Óscar Magalhães	Regular	Regular
Marco Delgado	César Varela	Regular	Regular
Maria Emília Correia	Conceição Cardoso	Regular	Regular
Joaquim Horta	Sérgio Vasconcelos	Absent	Regular
Nuno Pardal	Nuno Fonseca	Regular	Absent
Sílvia Rizzo	Helena Nogueira	Regular	Regular
Alfredo Brito	José Brito	Regular	Regular
Teresa Macedo	Joana Magalhães	Regular	Regular
Maria João Falcão	Malvina Alexandra «Xana» Cardoso	Regular	Regular
Luís Gaspar	Artur Aguiar	Regular	Regular
Adriano Toloza	Enzo Castro Melo	Absent	Regular
Vera Alves	Teresa Aguiar	Regular	Absent
Miguel Nunes	Afonso Nogueira	Regular	Regular
Frederico Barata	Leonardo «Leo» Galvão	Regular	Regular
Júlia Palha	Alice Lobo Trindade	Regular	Regular
Rodrigo Tomás	Eduardo «Edu» Alves	Regular	Regular
Úrsula Corona	Letícia	Absent	Regular
Afonso Lagarto	Filipe Duarte Fonseca	Regular	Regular
Bárbara Branco	Simone Aguiar	Regular	Regular
Rodrigo Trindade	Gabriel Lobo Trindade	Regular	Regular
Lucélia Santos	Marília Montenegro	Guest Actress	Guest Actress
Edwin Luisi	Gilberto Montenegro	Guest Actor	Guest Actor
Cristina Lago	Carolina «Carol» Montenegro	Guest Actress	Absent
Lídia Franco	Maria de Lurdes «Milú» Nogueira	Guest	Guest
Sinde Filipe	Gaspar Lobo	Guest	Absent
Margarida Serrano	Rita Lobo Trindade	Children	Children
Lourenço Conde	Tiago Magalhães	Children	Children
Marisa Cruz	Eva Gonçalves	Adicional	Adicional
Eduardo Gaspar	Heitor Nascimento	Adicional	Adicional
Marcus André	Frederico «Fred» Pires	Adicional	Adicional

== Series overview ==
Season	Episodes	Originally released	
Season	Episodes	First released	Last released
1	96	September 15, 2019	January 22, 2020
2	91	January 23, 2020	May 15, 2020

== Awards and nominations ==
Year	Award	Category	Result	Ref.
2020	International Emmy Award	Best Telenovela	Nominated	
