= Caer en tentación =

Mexican telenovela

- Genre: Telenovela
- Created by: Leonardo Bechini; Óscar Tabernise
- Based on: Amar después de amar by Erika Halvorsen and Gonzalo Demaría
- Written by: Leonardo Bechini; Óscar Tabernise; María Elena López
- Story by: Erika Halvorsen; Gonzalo Demaría
- Directed by: Eric Morales; Juan Pablo Blanco
- Creative director: Jimena Galeoti
- Starring: Silvia Navarro; Gabriel Soto; Adriana Louvier; Carlos Ferro
- Theme music composer: Pablo Alborán
- Opening theme: "Saturno" by Pablo Alborán
- Composer: Jordi Bachbush
- Country of origin: Mexico
- Original language: Spanish
- No. of seasons: 1
- No. of episodes: 102

Production
- Executive producer: Giselle González
- Producer: Julieta de la O
- Cinematography: Armando Zafra; Luis Arturo Rodríguez; Luis García; Alfredo Kassem
- Editors: Julio Abreu; Juan José Segundo
- Camera setup: Multi-camera
- Production company: Televisa

Original release
- Network: Las Estrellas
- Release: 18 September 2017 – 11 February 2018

Related
- Amar Depois de Amar (2019); El nudo (2019)

Caer en tentación (English: Fall Into Temptation) is a Mexican telenovela produced by Giselle González for Televisa. It is a remake of the 2017 Argentine telenovela Amar después de amar, created by Erika Halvorsen and Gonzalo Demaría. The series stars Silvia Navarro, Gabriel Soto, Adriana Louvier, and Carlos Ferro. It aired on Las Estrellas from 18 September 2017 to 11 February 2018. In the United States, it aired on Univision from 16 October 2017 to 2 March 2018.

Caer en tentación won ten awards out of 18 nominations at the Premios TVyNovelas 2018, including the Best Telenovela of the Year, Best Cast, Best Original Story or Adaptation, Best Direction, and Best Co-lead Actor for Carlos Ferro. The theme song "Saturno" performed by Pablo Alborán also won the award for Best Musical Theme.

== Plot ==
Caer en tentación is a thrilling story of two families marked by a tragedy that discovers the infidelity between two married couples. The story is told in two different timelines: the past (pasado) and the present (época actual).

Raquel and Damián Becker are a wealthy and happy couple with two children, Mía and Fede. Destiny leads Damián to meet Carolina and feel an undeniable attraction towards her. Damián did not know that Carolina is already married to Santiago Álvarado, a construction architect with whom she has two children, Nico and Lola. When Raquel drops off her son Fede at school, she accidentally backs her car to Santiago's truck, and they realize that their sons know each other. Raquel volunteers to pay for the damages but Santiago refuses. Raquel insists and visits the Álvarado family's house alongside Damián. The two couples become great friends, but the forbidden love between Damián and Carolina is stronger than their marriage commitment and both decide to deceive to their spouses. One night, Damián and Carolina have a terrible car accident at the forest. Rescuers only find a seriously injured Damián, and Carolina has mysteriously disappeared from the scene. During the investigation by the police, Raquel and Santiago learns that their spouses are lovers.

== Cast ==
=== Main ===
- Silvia Navarro as Raquel Cohen Nasser de Becker
- Gabriel Soto as Damián Becker Franco
- Adriana Louvier as Carolina Rivas Trejo de Álvarado
  - Dalexa Meneses as young Carolina
- Carlos Ferro as Santiago Álvarado Flores
- Arath de la Torre as Andrés Becker Acher
- Julieta Egurrola as Miriam Franco de Becker
- Beatriz Moreno as Jovita
- Ela Velden as Mía Becker Cohen
- Julia Urbini as Dolores "Lola" Álvarado Rivas
- Luz Ramos as Laura García Jiménez de Godoy
- Carlos Valencia as Vicente Rivas Trejo
  - Daney Mendoza as young Vicente
- Enoc Leaño as Rodolfo Rueda
- Irineo Álvarez as Antonio Ibáñez Lara
- Adalberto Parra as Ignacio "Nacho" Galindo
- Luis Fernando Peña as Agustín Chávez
- Ana Ciocchetti as Azucena
- Jorge Luis Vázquez as Fernando Godoy Alba
- Germán Bracco as Federico "Fede" Becker Cohen
- José Manuel Rincón as Nicolas "Nico" Álvarado Rivas
- Francisco Pizaña as Juan Durán
- Pierre Louis as Bernardo "Bebo" Galindo Pérez
- Andrea Guerrero as Cynthia Cohen Nasser
- Nicole Vale as Julieta
- Erika de la Rosa as Alina del Villar

=== Recurring and guest stars ===
- Moisés Arizmendi as Christian
- Liz Gallardo as Gabriela Izaguirre
- Monserrat Marañón as Lisa Ávalos
- Jorge de los Reyes as Rafael Estrada
- Alicia Jaziz as Florencia Chávez
- Ignacio Tahhan as Miguel Villegas
- Xabiani Ponce de León as Joaquín
- Dayren Chávez as Luz
- Jerry Velázquez as Dany
- Luisa Rubino as Patricia Vargas
- Alejandro de Hoyos Parera as Sammy Rueda
- Arturo Carmona as Leonardo
- Fernando Robles as Zaldívar
- Dettmar Yáñez as Blas Garrido

== Production ==
Production began in May 2017 under the working titles Nadie más en el mundo and Pasiones ocultas. Filming of the telenovela began on July 3, 2017, with Caer en tentación confirmed as the official title. Filming concluded in January 2018.

== Episodes ==
No.	Title	Original release date	Mexico viewers (millions)
1	"Damián y Carolina sufren un grave accidente"	18 September 2017 (Note: Episode 1 was originally broadcast on September 18, 2017.)	3.6
2	"¿Dónde está Carolina?"	25 September 2017 (Note: Episode 2,3,4, and 5 did not air on September 19, 20, 21, 22 and 23, due to 2017 Central Mexico earthquake. Subsequently, on September 24, normal transmissions are resumed.)	2.2
3	"Raquel descubre la mentira de Damián"	26 September 2017	3.3
4	"Carolina cae en la tentación de Damián"	27 September 2017	3.3
5	"Santiago busca a Vicente"	28 September 2017	3.0
6	"Comienzan los problemas entre Santiago y Carolina"	29 September 2017	3.1
7	"Miriam quiere destruir a Raquel"	2 October 2017	3.0
8	"Carolina es encontrada sin vida"	3 October 2017	3.3
9	"La policía busca al asesino de Carolina"	4 October 2017	3.3
10	"Andrés es sospechoso en el Caso Becker"	5 October 2017	3.1
11	"Lola está en problemas"	6 October 2017	2.8
12	"Mía sufre una agresión sexual"	9 October 2017	2.7
13	"Damián defiende a Lola"	10 October 2017	2.9
14	"Raquel y Santiago llegan al lugar de la tentación"	11 October 2017	2.9
15	"Vicente amenaza a Carolina"	12 October 2017	3.0
16	"Miriam le quita todo a Raquel"	13 October 2017	2.6
17	"Godoy descubre que Carolina y Damián tuvieron un hijo"	16 October 2017	3.0
18	"Santiago explota contra Damián"	17 October 2017	3.2
19	"Santiago promete proteger a Raquel"	18 October 2017	2.7
20	"Carolina intenta ocultar su embarazo"	19 October 2017	2.9
21	"Tres años de mentiras y engaños"	20 October 2017	2.7
22	"Santiago y Raquel son acusados de asesinar a Carolina"	23 October 2017	3.2
23	"Mía nota los celos de Carolina"	24 October 2017	3.1
24	"Otra traición de Damián sale a la luz"	25 October 2017	3.2
25	"Andrés abusa de Carolina"	26 October 2017	3.1
26	"Santiago sospecha de Andrés"	27 October 2017	2.6
27	"Andrés y Damián llegan a un acuerdo"	30 October 2017	3.0
28	"Raquel se muere de celos"	31 October 2017	2.5
29	"Vicente descubre la infidelidad de Carolina"	1 November 2017	2.2
30	"La policía sospecha de Nacho"	2 November 2017	2.6
31	"Damián decide terminar su relación con Carolina"	3 November 2017	2.7
32	"Nico cae en las redes de Alina"	6 November 2017	2.9
33	"Lola recibe una carta de Patricia"	7 November 2017	2.9
34	"Gabriela le ocasiona problemas a Damián"	8 November 2017	2.6
35	"Mía y Fede creen que Damián es infiel"	9 November 2017	2.8
36	"Raquel acepta estar enamorada de Santiago"	10 November 2017	2.4
37	"Mía hace sentir mal a Damián"	13 November 2017	2.8
38	"Raquel sufre por el abandono de Damián"	14 November 2017	3.0
39	"Christian descubre que Carolina es la amante de Damián"	15 November 2017	2.5
40	"Carolina condiciona a Damián"	16 November 2017	2.6
41	"Raquel y Santiago ya no quieren esconder su amor"	17 November 2017	2.7
42	"Mía amenaza a Raquel"	20 November 2017	2.6
43	"Raquel y Santiago deben separarse"	21 November 2017	2.7
44	"Laura delata a Cinthia"	22 November 2017	2.3
45	"Carolina se culpa por la muerte de su bebé"	23 November 2017	2.6
46	"Damián presencia el parto de Carolina"	24 November 2017	2.4
47	"Benjamín no es hijo de Santiago"	27 November 2017	2.4
48	"Vicente y Carolina comparten un oscuro secreto"	28 November 2017	2.6
49	"Vicente revela el pasado de Carolina"	29 November 2017	2.3
50	"Los Becker y los Álvarado se reúnen por Benjamín"	30 November 2017	2.6
51	"Miriam y Santiago pelean por la custodia de Benjamín"	1 December 2017	2.6
52	"Federico intenta descubrir su sexualidad"	4 December 2017	2.7
53	"Raquel deja a Santiago para proteger a Mía"	5 December 2017	2.9
54	"Godoy está seguro que Santiago es el asesino"	6 December 2017	3.0
55	"Raquel intenta negociar con Miriam"	7 December 2017	2.3
56	"Nacho es inocente"	8 December 2017	2.2
57	"Raquel cree estar embarazada"	11 December 2017	2.6
58	"Carolina se enfrenta a Damián"	12 December 2017	2.5
59	"Raquel sufre una crisis de pánico"	13 December 2017	2.5
60	"Alina acepta el soborno de Rueda"	14 December 2017	2.5
61	"Raquel es secuestrada"	15 December 2017	2.3
62	"Santiago es arrestado por homicidio"	18 December 2017	2.1
63	"Miriam quiere vengar a Damián"	19 December 2017	2.7
64	"Andrés tiene un plan para hundir a Santiago"	20 December 2017	2.5
65	"Florencia provoca los celos de Carolina"	21 December 2017	2.4
66	"Miriam gana la custodia de Benjamín"	22 December 2017	2.2
67	"Santiago está dispuesto a escapar de la cárcel"	25 December 2017	1.5
68	"Alina tiene a Nicolás en sus manos"	26 December 2017	2.3
69	"Carolina sospecha que Raquel descubrió todo"	27 December 2017	2.6
70	"Antonio y Godoy van tras el verdadero asesino"	28 December 2017	2.4
71	"El tiempo de Damián se terminó"	29 December 2017	2.1
72	"Carolina pierde la amistad de Raquel"	1 January 2018	2.1
73	"Carolina frena las amenazas de Vicente"	2 January 2018	2.8
74	"Federico se revela ante Andrés y Miriam"	3 January 2018	2.8
75	"Damián despertó"	4 January 2018	2.6
76	"Lola le confiesa su secreto a Alina"	5 January 2018	2.5
77	"Andrés quiere deshacerse de Miguel"	8 January 2018	2.7
78	"Damián le pone un alto a Mía"	9 January 2018	3.0
79	"Raquel debe decidir... Damián o Santiago"	10 January 2018	2.6
80	"Florencia se preocupa por Santiago"	11 January 2018	2.6
81	"Lisa cree que Vicente mató a Carolina"	12 January 2018	2.5
82	"Santiago le pide explicaciones a Vicente"	15 January 2018	2.9
83	"Alina debe evitar que Raquel y Santiago sigan juntos"	16 January 2018	2.8
84	"Carolina está dispuesta a terminar con sus problemas"	17 January 2018	2.9
85	"Lola ve a Raquel como una madre"	18 January 2018	2.8
86	"Mía acepta envenenar a Alina"	19 January 2018	2.8
87	"Alina intenta que Santiago se enfrente a Raquel"	22 January 2018	2.7
88	"Raquel y Carolina recuperan su amistad"	23 January 2018	2.8
89	"Raquel no pude dejar a Damián"	24 January 2018	3.0
90	"Damián quiere deshacerse de Vicente"	25 January 2018	2.7
91	"Federico descubre a Damián"	26 January 2018	2.8
92	"Andrés intenta comprar a Laura"	29 January 2018	3.0
93	"Damián quiere huir con Carolina"	30 January 2018	2.8
94	"Santiago pierde la confianza de Raquel"	31 January 2018	2.9
95	"Raquel quiere saber la verdad"	1 February 2018	2.8
96	"Garrido confiesa ante la policía"	2 February 2018	2.8
97	"Carolina le pide el divorcio a Santiago"	5 February 2018	2.8
98	"Raquel quiere saber la verdad sobre Carolina"	6 February 2018	2.7
99	"Raquel ya no quiere seguir a lado de Damián"	7 February 2018	2.8
100	"Santiago sabía la verdad sobre la infidelidad de Carolina"	8 February 2018	2.7
101	"Andrés mata a Azucena"	9 February 2018	3.0
102	"Damián se declara culpable"	11 February 2018	3.7

== Reception ==
=== Critical reception ===
Writing for Milenio, Álvaro Cueva praised Caer en tentación as a masterpiece for its storytelling, production and acting performances of the entire cast, He states that "this isn't your typical story. It's a plot that questions love, desire, fidelity, and even the very value of family. As if that weren't enough, this story—which is powerful, dangerous, and controversial—is told in two different time periods in every episode." Cueva also lauded the finale episode and wrote, "Caer en tentación is not only fabulous for having kept us glued to the television for so long looking at such a complex issue. It's fabulous for its extremely high level of ethical, artistic and editorial consistency."

=== Ratings ===
==== Mexico ratings ====
Viewership and ratings per season of Caer en tentación
Season	Episodes	First aired		Last aired		Avg. viewers (millions)
Season	Episodes	Date	Viewers (millions)	Date	Viewers (millions)	Avg. viewers (millions)
1	102	18 September 2017	3.6	11 February 2018	3.7	2.75

==== U.S. ratings ====
Viewership and ratings per season of Caer en tentación
Season	Episodes	First aired		Last aired		Avg. viewers (millions)
Season	Episodes	Date	Viewers (millions)	Date	Viewers (millions)	Avg. viewers (millions)
1	93	16 October 2017	1.59	2 March 2018	1.95	TBD

=== Awards and nominations ===
Year	Award	Category	Nominated	Result
2018	36th TVyNovelas Awards	Best Telenovela of the Year	Giselle González	Won
2018	36th TVyNovelas Awards	Best Actress	Adriana Louvier	Nominated
2018	36th TVyNovelas Awards	Best Actress	Silvia Navarro	Nominated
2018	36th TVyNovelas Awards	Best Actor	Gabriel Soto	Nominated
2018	36th TVyNovelas Awards	Best Antagonist Actress	Julieta Egurrola	Nominated
2018	36th TVyNovelas Awards	Best Antagonist Actor	Arath de la Torre	Nominated
2018	36th TVyNovelas Awards	Best Leading Actress	Julieta Egurrola	Nominated
2018	36th TVyNovelas Awards	Best Leading Actor	Adalberto Parra	Nominated
2018	36th TVyNovelas Awards	Best Co-lead Actor	Carlos Ferro	Won
2018	36th TVyNovelas Awards	Best Supporting Actress	Julia Urbini	Won
2018	36th TVyNovelas Awards	Best Supporting Actor	Carlos Valencia	Nominated
2018	36th TVyNovelas Awards	Best Young Lead Actress	Ela Velden	Won
2018	36th TVyNovelas Awards	Best Young Lead Actor	Germán Bracco	Won
2018	36th TVyNovelas Awards	Best Original Story or Adaptation	Leonardo Bechini	Won
2018	36th TVyNovelas Awards	Best Direction	Eric Morales and Juan Pablo Blanco	Won
2018	36th TVyNovelas Awards	Best Direction of the Cameras	Armando Zafra and Luis Rodríguez	Won
2018	36th TVyNovelas Awards	Best Musical Theme	"Saturno" (Pablo Alborán)	Won
2018	36th TVyNovelas Awards	Best Cast	Caer en tentación	Won
