= Infinito amor =

- Genre: Telenovela
- Based on: Amar Demais by Maria João Costa
- Developed by: Katia Rodríguez Estrada; Doménica Tarello
- Written by: Alberto Aridjis; Carolina Mejía Lartilleux
- Directed by: Claudia E. Aguilar; Armando Quiñones; Carolina Mejía Lartilleux; Diego Mejía Lartilleux
- Starring: Livia Brito; Gonzalo García Vivanco; Marjorie de Sousa; Josh Gutiérrez; Eugenia Cauduro; Bárbara Islas; Christian de la Campa; Luis Felipe Tovar; Guillermo García Cantú
- Theme music composer: Chayanne; Ricardo López; Edgar Barrera; Elena Rose
- Opening theme: "Te amo y punto" by Chayanne
- Composer: Álvaro Trespalacios
- Country of origin: Mexico
- Original language: Spanish
- No. of seasons: 1
- No. of episodes: 29

Production
- Executive producer: Salvador Mejía
- Producer: Laura Mezta Cordero
- Cinematography: Esteban de Llaca; Camila Mejía Lartilleux
- Editors: Mark Rouch; Alfredo Frutos Maza; Víctor Hugo Flores
- Camera setup: Multi-camera
- Production company: TelevisaUnivision

Original release
- Network: Las Estrellas
- Release: 12 October 2026 – present

Infinito amor (English title: Endless Love) is a Mexican telenovela produced by Salvador Mejía for TelevisaUnivision. It is based on the 2020 Portuguese television series Amar Demais, created by Maria João Costa. The series stars Livia Brito and Gonzalo García Vivanco. It premiered on Las Estrellas on 12 October 2026.

== Plot ==
At age 13, Ariel Bravo becomes the sole provider for his sisters and his mother, Soledad, who has a serious illness. His only comfort is knowing that Cristina loves him as much as he loves her. Ariel's childhood comes to an abrupt end when Leandro, a corrupt police officer, falsely accuses him of causing him to lose an eye. Persecuted and with no other options, on his mother's advice, he flees to Mexico City, leaving his family and Cristina behind. In the capital, Ariel works at his uncle Arnoldo's junkyard and at Hortensia's restaurant, determined to support his mother financially. His refuge is the bookstore owned by Don Justino, an elderly man who will become his mentor. Meanwhile, back in his hometown, Soledad lies to Cristina, telling her that Ariel has forgotten her, leaving Cristina heartbroken.

Eight years later, Cristina discovers the truth and goes to the city to find Ariel. They are reunited but their happiness is short-lived. Arnoldo tries to assault Cristina, who defends herself and flees, believing she has killed him. At the same time, Arsenio runs over and kills Leandro. His uncle Johnny covers up the crime and orders Malaquías to find a scapegoat: the victim is Ariel, who accepts money for his mother's medical treatment in exchange for taking the blame for the murder, resulting in a 20 year sentence. Once in prison, Ariel believes that his mother has recovered thanks to his sacrifice, but in reality, Arsenio abandons Soledad to her fate and assumes she is dead. Ariel receives a visit from Cristina, but, feeling unworthy of her love, he rejects her without confessing the truth. Cristina gives birth to Ariel's daughter, Rosario. Shortly afterward, her house burns down, her father dies, and a neighbor, Celia, swaps her dead daughter for Rosario. Meanwhile, a car accident leaves Cristina unconscious, and when she wakes up, she believes her daughter has died.

Fifteen years later, Ariel is released from prison, and her sisters tell him that their mother is dead. However, an anonymous note from Pablo, Arsenio's father, reveals the truth: his mother is alive. In addition, Pablo leaves him a fortune in diamonds so he can find her and seek justice. Ariel must find his mother and also discover who stole fifteen years of his life. To clear his name and seek justice, he faces betrayals, powerful interests, and secrets in order to reclaim what was taken from him.

== Cast ==
=== Main ===
- Livia Brito as Cristina Vidal
  - Marjorie Izeta as child Cristina
- Gonzalo Garcia Vivanco as Ariel Bravo
  - Ruy Gaytán as child Ariel
- Marjorie de Sousa as Amanda Soriano
- Josh Gutiérrez as Arsenio Duarte
- Eugenia Cauduro as Soledad
- Bárbara Islas as Emilia
- Christian de la Campa as David
- Luis Felipe Tovar as Arnoldo
- Guillermo García Cantú as Johnny
- Jacqueline Andere as Victoria
- Fernando Larrañaga as Justino
- Marcelo Córdoba as Malaquías
- Sofía Olea Levet as Macarena
- Rocío de Santiago as Constanza
- Gaby Mellado as Ruth
- Jonnathan Kuri as Marcelo
- Michelle Pellicer as María
- Esther Rinaldi as Carmela
- Jessica Coch as Celia
- Marco León as Leo
- Karla Sofía as Alba
- Jaime Maqueo as Franco
- Raúl Coronado as Marco
- Sofía Valencia as Majo
- Julio Herrera as Kike
- Asbel Ramses as Chacal
- Gabriel Barbosa as Kevin
- Damián Rangel Ayala as Ari

=== Recurring and guest stars ===
- Isadora González as Magdalena
- Rafael del Villar as Ferreira
- Amairani as Hortensia
- Sergio Jurado as Santos
- Alberto Casanova as Leandro
- Jorge Ortín as Gaspar
- Gerardo Murguía as Pablo
- José Luis Duval as Darío
- Ruth Rosas as Gertrudis
- Araceli Adame as Susi
- Perla Corona as Samantha
- Paulina de Labra as Nun
- Linda Galván as Tere
- Alfonso Jean as El Negro
- Tania Robledo as Julia
- Juan Colucho as Omar

== Production ==
In May 2026, the series was announced at TelevisaUnivision's upfront for the 2026–2027 television season. On 2 July 2026, Livia Brito and Gonzalo García Vivanco were cast in the lead roles, with Marjorie de Sousa and Josh Gutiérrez cast as the antagonists. Filming of the telenovela began on 22 July 2026.

== Ratings ==
Viewership and ratings per season of Infinito amor
Season	Timeslot (CT)	Episodes	First aired		Last aired		Avg. viewers (millions)
Season	Timeslot (CT)	Episodes	Date	Viewers (millions)	Date	Viewers (millions)	Avg. viewers (millions)
1	Mon–Fri 6:30 p.m.	26	12 October 2026	3.74	TBA	TBD	3.48

== Episodes ==
No.	Title	Original release date	Mexico viewers (millions)
1	"Siempre juntos"	12 October 2026 (Note: Premiered early online through Las Estrellas website on 9 October 2026.)	3.74
2	"El precio de la vida de tu madre"	13 October 2026	3.71
3	"20 años de cárcel"	14 October 2026	N/A
4	"Mi condena nunca va a terminar"	15 October 2026	3.70
5	"No soy el vengador, soy el castigo"	16 October 2026	3.71
6	"Tuve que sobrevivir"	19 October 2026	3.32
7	"Acceso denegado"	20 October 2026	3.54
8	"Mi lucha apenas empieza"	21 October 2026	3.77
9	"Se metió a la boca del lobo"	22 October 2026	3.26
10	"Esta es mi verdad"	23 October 2026	3.47
11	"No llegó por casualidad"	26 October 2026	3.45
12	"Para eso la mantuvimos viva"	27 October 2026	3.48
13	"La verdad saldrá a la luz"	28 October 2026	3.73
14	"Mi voz ya no tiene fuerza"	29 October 2026	3.52
15	"Si quieres guerra, la tendrás"	30 October 2026	3.10
16	"No hay ley que valga más que el dinero"	2 November 2026	3.31
17	"Cambiaría todo ese dinero por mi mamá"	3 November 2026	3.63
18	"Nuestra hija podría estar viva"	4 November 2026	3.80
19	"El divorcio o tu hijo"	5 November 2026	3.84
20	"El Conde de Todos los Santos"	6 November 2026	3.20
21	"Encontraré a mi hija"	9 November 2026	3.41
22	"Necesitas un cómplice"	10 November 2026	3.52
23	"Ya nunca nos vamos a separar"	11 November 2026	3.27
24	"Quiero casarme contigo"	12 November 2026	3.17
25	"¿Por qué lo defiendes tanto?"	13 November 2026	3.32
26	"¿Tu corazón es libre?"	16 November 2026	3.54
27	"La vida te recompensa"	17 November 2026	2.92
28	"La hija de otra mujer"	18 November 2026	TBD
29	"No te acerques a mi mujer"	19 November 2026	TBD
