= Amar después de amar =

Argentine telenovela

- From left to right: Damián Kaplan (Federico Amador), Carolina Fazio (Eleonora Wexler), Santiago Alvarado (Mariano Martínez) and Raquel Levin (Isabel Macedo)
- Genre: Melodrama; Romance; Police
- Written by: Erika Halvorsen; Micaela Libson; Esteban Garrido
- Directed by: Miguel Ángel Colom; Pablo Vázquez
- Starring: Mariano Martínez; Isabel Macedo; Eleonora Wexler; Federico Amador
- Theme music composer: Cacho Castaña
- Opening theme: "Para vivir un gran amor"
- Country of origin: Argentina
- Original language: Spanish
- No. of seasons: 1
- No. of episodes: 70

Production
- Producer: Telefe Contenidos
- Production location: Buenos Aires
- Running time: 45 minutes

Original release
- Network: Telefe
- Release: January 23 – May 18, 2017

Related
- Caer en tentación (Mexico); Amar Depois de Amar (Portugal); Erotas Meta (Greece); El nudo

Amar, después de amar (English: Love after Loving) is a 2017 Argentine telenovela produced by Telefe Contenidos and broadcast by Telefe. The series was recorded entirely in Resolución 4K. Starring Mariano Martínez, Isabel Macedo, Eleonora Wexler and Federico Amador, co-starring Michel Noher and Manuela Pal and with the antagonistic participations of Virginia Lago, Brenda Gandini, Gastón Ricaud, Maximiliano Ghione and Roberto Vallejos. Also with the youth participation of Delfina Chaves, Franco Masini, Manuel Ramos and Camila Mateos. His first broadcast took place on Monday January 23, 2017 at 22:00 with an audience rate of 12.3 points, winning his competition to Quiero vivir a tu lado broadcast by Canal 13.

== Plot ==
The accident of a couple on the road raises dozens of questions. The woman's body has disappeared. The man remains in a coma. The identity of both reveals a secret: they were not married, they were lovers.

Three years earlier, a friendship between two married couples becomes a prelude to that forbidden love. Raquel and Damián, wealthy fishing entrepreneurs, meet Carolina a young housewife and her husband Santiago, an expanding construction worker.

The change of school of the teenage children of both causes the crossing of their lives. They do not know that the meeting of families will awaken the inevitable relationship between Carolina and Damián.

A story in two times. The secret love of lovers in the past. And the pain of the deceived in the present, which will culminate in a love story.

== Cast ==
- Mariano Martínez as Santiago José Alvarado
- Isabel Macedo as Raquel Judith Levin de Kaplan
- Eleonora Wexler as Carolina Fazzio de Alvarado
- Federico Amador as Kaplan.
- Michel Noher as Detective Emeterio Godoy
- Manuela Pal as Laura Eyzaguirre de Godoy
- Virginia Lago as Myriam Cohen de Kaplan
- Claudio Rissi as Antonio Valente
- Gastón Ricaud as Andrés Kaplan
- Maximiliano Ghione as Isaac Roth
- Brenda Gandini as Alina Cifuentes
- Marita Ballesteros as Azucena
- Camila Mateos as Lola Alvarado
- Franco Masini as Nicolás Alvarado
- Delfina Chaves as Mía Kaplan
- Manuel Ramos as Federico Kaplan
- Roberto Vallejos as Vicente Fazio
- Federico Tassara as Benjamín Alvarado/Benjamín Kaplan
- Hernán Jiménez as Amílcar “Mocheta” Villoldo
- Agustín Vera as Gustavo "Bebo" Correa
- Cala Zavaleta as Cynthia Levin
- Macarena Suárez as Luz Novikov
- Santiago Pedrero as Kevin
- Juan Bautista Greppi as Juan Wright
- Luli Torn as Catalina Bacci
- Dana Basso as Alicia De Felipe
- Jorge Prado as José "El Sarro" Miguet
- Adrián Ero as Pehuen "El Guacho" Bazán/Eusebio Sebastián Miguet
- Pablo Bellini as Jesús Novikov
- Alejandro Zebe as Samuel "Sammy" Roth
- Malena Figo as Gabriela Calabrese
- Pablo Novak as Cristian Issel
- Óscar Dubini as Arturo Wright
- Estela Garelli as Evelina de Wright
- Susana Varela as Celia Bazán
- Silvia Geijo as Rosa
- Lucrecia Gelardi as Lisa
- Agustín Sullivan as Brian
- Ana Clara Bérgamo as Sofía
- Andrés Caminos as Lorenzo
- Gabriel Villalba as Gregorio
- Florencia Sacchi as Vanesa
- Sabrina Sequeira as Lidia
- Ariel Bertone as Mauro
- Flavia Marco as Gisela
- Guillermina Caro as Mercedes
- Javier Niklison as Nazabal
- Marina Artigas as Tamara
- Carlos Cano as Japo

== International versions ==
Hiatus

Country	Title	Channel	Airdates
Lebanon	تانغو Tango	LBCI Lebanon; LDC; MBC Group; LDC; Hawas Tv; Rotana Drama; OSN Yahala; Roya TV	May 16, 2018 – June 15, 2018
Greece; Cyprus	Έρωτας μετά	Alpha TV	September 16, 2019
Mexico	Caer en tentación	Las Estrellas	September 18, 2017 – February 11, 2018
Portugal	Amar Depois de Amar	TVI	June 17, 2019 – September 13, 2019
Spain	El nudo	Atresplayer Premium	November 24, 2019 – February 16, 2020
