= Vuélveme a querer (TV series) =

- Created by: Mariela Romero
- Developed by: TV Azteca; Venevisión International
- Directed by: Carlos Villegas; Leonardo Galavis
- Starring: Mariana Torres; Jorge Alberti
- Opening theme: "Vuelveme A Querer" Performed by Amaury Gutiérrez
- Country of origin: Mexico
- Original language: Spanish
- No. of episodes: 139

Production
- Executive producer: Alicia Avila
- Producer: Rosa Longobardi
- Production locations: Monterrey, Mexico City
- Editor: Juana Maria Torres
- Camera setup: Multi-camera
- Running time: 42 minutes

Original release
- Network: Azteca 13
- Release: 9 February – 21 August 2009

Related
- Contrato de amor; Mujer comprada

Vuélveme a querer (Love Me Again) is the title of a Spanish-language telenovela produced by the Mexican television network TV Azteca with Venevisión International. It stars Mariana Torres and Jorge Alberti as protagonists. It is a remake of Venezuelan telenovela Destino de mujer in 1997, produced and broadcast by Venevision and starred by Sonya Smith and Jorge Reyes.

== Cast ==
=== Main casts ===
Actor	Character	Known as
Mariana Torres	Mariana Montesinos Acosta	Main Heroine, daughter of Samuel and Liliana, in love with Ricardo
Jorge Alberti	Ricardo Robles	Main Hero, son of Ignacio, adopted son of Irene and Hector, in love with Mariana
Omar Fierro	Samuel Montesinos	Villain. Father of Mariana, husband of Lorenza, killed by police
Anna Ciocchetti	Lorenza Acosta	Villain. Wife of Samuel, sister of Liliana
Cecilia Ponce	Corina Nieto	Villain. Girlfriend of Ricardo
José Luis Franco	Víctor Acevedo	Villain. Boyfriend of Mariana
Omar Germenos	Ignacio Reyes	Father of Ricardo and Santiago, killed by Samuel
Sonya Smith	Liliana Acosta	Mother of Mariana, sister of Lorenza

=== Secondary casts ===
Actor	Character	Known as
Martha Mariana Castro	Irene Robles	Wife of Héctor, mother of José Manuel and Tamara
Luis Miguel Lombana	Héctor Robles	Husband of Irene, father of José Manuel and Tamara
Jorge Luis Vázquez	José Manuel Robles	Son of Irene and Héctor
Angélica Magaña	Tamara Robles	Daughter of Irene and Héctor
Mayra Rojas	Carmela Mejía	Mother of Rafael, aunt of Nora
Manuel Balbi	Rafael Mejía	Son of Carmela and Samuel
Dora Cordero	Dolores de Mejía	Wife of Rigoberto, mother of Nora
Eñoc Leaño	Rigoberto Mejía	Husband of Dolores, father of Nora
Liz Gallardo	Nora Mejía	Daughter of Dolores and Rigoberto
Alan Chávez	Enrique Mejía	Son of Dolores and Rigoberto
Sylvia Sáenz	Isabel Mejía	
Carmen Delgado	Rosa María Muñiz	
Heriberto Méndez	Santiago Muñiz	Adopted son of Rosa María, son of Ignacio, brother of Ricardo, killed by Samuel
Ximena Muñóz	Estela Ramírez	
René Gatica	Elías Tamayo	Friend of Ricardo
Fernando Sarfati	Jesús Nieto	Father of Corina
Eva Prado	Ángela Ascaño	Mother of Corina
Ramiro Fumazoni	Julio Peña	Son of Alfredo
Carlos Torrestorija	Dr. Alfredo Peña	Father of Julio, in love with Liliana
Mauricio Hess	Bernardo Peña	Son of Alfredo, brother of Julio
Mariana Beyer	Rubí Peña	Daughter of Julio
Emiliano Fernández	Memito Moreno	Friend of Rubí
Raki	Alcalde Ortiz	
Jenny Moreno	Martha Ortiz	
Allan Becker	young Ricardo Reyes	Son of Ignacio, brother of Santiago
Eivién Joshua	young Santiago Reyes	Son of Ignacio, brother of Ricardo
Abel Fernando Pérez		
Adriana Parra	Gregoria	Accomplice of Lorenza
Alejandra Briseño	Patricia	
Alexandra Vicencio		
Arnoldo Picazzo	Father Martín	Priest
Daniela Carbajal		
Daniela Torres	Teresa	
Elsa Jaimes	Lorena Ochoa	
Estela Calderón	Claudia Villegas	
Héctor Silva	Pedro	
Jorge Galvan		Priest
Julieta Rosen	Valeria	
Leticia Pedrajo	Nelida	
Lucía Leyba	Romina	
María Hiromi	Berta	
Marina Vera		
Miguel Gurza		
Onésimo Barajas		
Ramiro Huerta	Roldán	Accomplice of Samuel and Lorenza
Ramón Medina	Arturo	
Roberto Montiel	Dr. Aurelio Ruíz	Accomplice of Lorenza
Rosario Zúñiga	Leticia	
Siari Schultz		
Tatiana Martínez	Magali Márquez	
Teresa Selma	Mirella	Grandmother of Rubí
Victor Luis Zuñiga	Ned	

== Trivia ==
- This is the fourth of four telenovelas (Olvidarte Jamas, Acorralada, Pecados Ajenos) which Sonya Smith and Mariana Torres star as mother and daughter.
- This is the first telenovela of Sonya Smith and Jorge Alberti in Mexico.
- Sonya Smith portrayed the main female role in the basis of Vuélveme a querer which is Destino de mujer, in the Mexican version she played the lead female's mother, which was portrayed by Lupita Ferrer in the original Venezuelan version.
