= Fuego ardiente =

Mexican television series

- Genre: Telenovela
- Written by: Martha Carrillo; Cristina García
- Directed by: Jorge Robles; Karina Duprez; Lily Garza
- Starring: Mariana Torres; Claudia Ramírez; Carlos Ferro; José María de Tavira; Claudia Martín; Kuno Becker
- Opening theme: "Este Fuego" by Joy Huerta
- Composers: Joy Huerta; Mauricio L. Arriaga; J. Eduardo Murguía
- Country of origin: Mexico
- Original language: Spanish
- No. of seasons: 1
- No. of episodes: 85

Production
- Executive producer: Carlos Moreno
- Producer: Eduardo Elizalde
- Editors: Alfredo Sánchez Díaz; Daniel Rentería
- Production company: Televisa

Original release
- Network: Las Estrellas
- Release: 8 February – 4 June 2021

Fuego ardiente (English: Burning Fire) is a Mexican telenovela that aired on Las Estrellas from 8 February 2021 to 4 June 2021. The series is produced by Carlos Moreno. It is an original story written by Martha Carrillo and Cristina García, and stars Mariana Torres, Carlos Ferro, Claudia Ramírez, and José María de Tavira.

== Plot ==
Dante (Fernando Ciangherotti) and Irene Ferrer (Claudia Ramírez) are owners of one of the most important and popular olive oil production companies in Mexico. Dante finds out that he suffers from ALS and decides to reunite the whole family knowing that he will soon die and feels the need to put all his issues in order and live with his family for the time that he has left, under the excuse of launching a new olive oil line. When the Ferrers reunite, a forbidden love is unleashed between Alexa (Mariana Torres) and Gabriel (Carlos Ferro). Both discover that behind the family business of olive oil production, hides the illegal activity of counterfeiting bills. Alexa is married to Joaquín Ferrer (Kuno Becker) and Gabriel is married to Martina Ferrer (Claudia Martín). Joaquín is the head of the illegal business and Gabriel is actually looking for his missing brother and believes that the Ferrers are behind his disappearance. Not all Ferrers are the same, Irene (Claudia Ramírez) is not like the rest of her family, she is a woman who fights for her physical and emotional independence, but breaks with traditions by falling in love with Fernando (José María de Tavira), a man younger than her.

== Cast ==
=== Main ===
- Mariana Torres as Alexa Gamba
- Claudia Ramírez as Irene Ferrer
- Carlos Ferro as Gabriel Montemayor
- José María de Tavira as Fernando Alcocer
- Claudia Martín as Martina Ferrer
- Kuno Becker as Joaquín Ferrer
- Arturo Peniche as Alfonso Juárez
- Laura Flores as Laura Urquidi
- Yolanda Ventura as Pilar Ortiz de Ferrer
- Fernando Ciangherotti as Dante Ferrer
- Luis Gatica as Nicolás
- Jaume Mateu as Rodrigo
- Bárbara Islas as Araceli
- Dayren Chávez as Cecilia
- Agustín Arana as Abel
- Socorro Bonilla as Soco
- José Elías Moreno as Father Mateo
- Odiseo Bichir as Heriberto
- Maya Ricote Rivero as Katia
- Sebastián Poza as Adriano Ferrer
- Candela Márquez as Tamara
- Chris Pazcal as David
- Carlos Speitzer as Baldomero
- Christian Ramos as Tomás
- Andrea Fátima as Morales
- Luis José Sevilla as Negrete
- Daniel Martínez Campos as Gerardo
- Jorge Caballero as Solís
- Luz Edith Rojas as Caridad
- Carmen Delgado as Marcela
- Juan Luis Arias as Chaparro
- Medín Villatoro as Juan
- Said Sandoval as Chino
- Leo Casta as Ramiro
- Miranda Kay as Carmen

=== Recurring ===
- Carmen Muga as Paulina
- Lorena Álvarez as Mercedes
- Felipe Carrera as Hernán
- Marco Uriel as Rubén Ferrer

== Production ==
The telenovela was announced on 15 October 2020 at Visión21 upfront. The main cast was revealed on 27 October 2020. Production began on 23 November 2020, and concluded in May 2021.

== Ratings ==
Viewership and ratings per season of Fuego ardiente
Season	Timeslot (CT)	Episodes	First aired		Last aired		Avg. viewers (millions)
Season	Timeslot (CT)	Episodes	Date	Viewers (millions)	Date	Viewers (millions)	Avg. viewers (millions)
1	Mon–Fri 6:30 p.m.	83	8 February 2021	2.5	4 June 2021	3.1	2.29

== Episodes ==
No.	Title	Original release date	Mexico viewers (millions)
1	"Siento que te conozco de toda la vida"	8 February 2021 (Note: Premiered early online through Las Estrellas website on 5 February 2021.)	2.5
Alexa and Gabriel meet after being trapped in an elevator due to an earthquake and after spending the night together in the lobby of the building, Alexa and Gabriel seal the moment with a kiss. Dante wants to end the illegal businesses.
2	"Decisiones sin vuelta atrás"	9 February 2021	2.6
Dante informs the family that he will retire and offers a position to Martina, but she rejects him flatly. Joaquín sets up a jealousy scene for Alexa. After meeting, Martina kisses Gabriel and he reciprocates, both get carried away by passion.
3	"Mucho gusto señora Ferrer"	10 February 2021	2.4
Gabriel and Alexa are at an event in the Ferrer house, Joaquín gets jealous when he sees his wife dance. Gabriel wants to leave the party, but Martina holds him back with a kiss.
4	"Egoísta"	11 February 2021	2.5
Joaquín decides to stay in the house after Dante's collapse, but Alexa refuses to continue living with him. Martina asks her brother for a loan. Irene and Fernando meet.
5	"Martirio"	12 February 2021	2.5
Alexa is jealous when she sees Martina and Gabriel together. Martina plans to invite Gabriel to live with her in London. Alexa leaves the house to put distance with Joaquín. Gabriel asks Alexa to hide what happened between them.
6	"Sesión de derechos"	15 February 2021	2.4
Dante is disappointed to learn that Joaquín and Martina plan to distribute their money before his death. Alexa is assaulted.
7	"Un buen negocio"	16 February 2021	2.3
Gabriel helps Alexa after suffering an assault. Joaquín pretends to support Alexa. Martina makes a juicy offer to Gabriel in order to collect her grandmother's inheritance.
8	"Cualquier decisión tiene consecuencias"	17 February 2021	2.4
Gabriel continues to investigate Hernán's disappearance and discovers Dante's illness. Alexa returns to the Ferrer house. Martina is still looking for someone to accept her proposal.
9	"No te cases con ella"	18 February 2021	2.4
Joaquín discovers that the police are still behind the counterfeit business. Alexa asks Gabriel not to accept Martina's proposal and the attraction they feel almost forces them to kiss. Gabriel suspects that his brother is dead.
10	"Mi futuro esposo"	19 February 2021	2.2
Gabriel agrees to marry Martina and Dante explodes upon knowing this, but when Martina assures him that she is worth more than he believes, he slaps her. Alexa suffers with the news.
11	"Me caso por amor"	22 February 2021	2.4
Gabriel swears to Dante that he wants to make a life with Martina and they agree to sign an agreement; Alexa gets jealous and the hawk has one of her distributors removed.
12	"Entrar por la puerta grande"	23 February 2021	2.4
Alexa can't stand the idea of living in the same house as Gabriel, Martina finds them together. Alexa remembers a tragic day in her life. Laura returns to the house to witness Martina's wedding, but neither Dante nor Joaquín are happy to see her.
13	"La boda de Martina y Gabriel"	24 February 2021	2.5
Laura returns to the house for Martina's wedding, but neither Dante nor Joaquín are happy to see her, so a strong argument ensues between mother and son. Irene defends Laura against the Ferrers. Joaquín assures Alexa that she is his headache. Martina thanks Alexa for helping her do her makeup. Gabriel meets his future mother-in-law and finds out what Dante did to her. Martina and Gabriel get married in a civil wedding, Alexa suffers when she sees them. Joaquín is reunited with an old love.
14	"Los príncipes azules no existen"	25 February 2021	2.4
Joaquín finds himself among the olive trees with an old love, but is discovered by Abel. Laura asks Alexa for help to get closer to her son, but she informs her that they will soon be separated. Rodrigo goes into shock when Pilar introduces him to Father Heriberto, Alexa tries to reassure him, but Rodrigo remembers the abuse he suffered as a child. Martina shares with her followers the entrance to the room for her wedding night. Pilar is very worried about Rodrigo. Dante remembers his confrontation with Laura.
15	"Unir fuerzas"	26 February 2021	2.1
Martina's friend continues to disturb Joaquín and he decides to be carried away by the fire of passion. Gabriel begins to investigate inside the house and finds several guns. Gabriel proposes to Alexa to keep the party in peace. Joaquin tries to make love to Alexa, but she rejects him. Gabriel agrees to ally with the police to find Hernán and dismantle the Ferrer family. Rodrigo seeks out Heriberto to confront him for what he did to him in the past. Katia and Adriano are sure they want to spend the night together. Irene and Fernando think more and more about each other.
16	"Nuestro amor es imposible"	1 March 2021	2.4
Laura asks Samuel to help her clear up her past infidelity. Gabriel confesses his love to Alexa and kisses her, but she asks him to forget her. Martina takes her role as his wife very seriously. Katia decides to have her first time with Adriano and they end up making love. Alexa can't stop thinking about Gabriel.
17	"El amor llega cuando menos te lo esperas"	2 March 2021	2.4
Alexa assures Sara that her relationship with Gabriel has no future. Laura and Alfonso remember what happened forty years ago when they were dating. Alexa no longer wants to be in the Ferrer house, she wants to return to the city, but Joaquín does not allow it. Irene and Fernando begin to miss each other. Rodrigo discovers that Ulises also suffered abuse from Heriberto as a child. Irene feels guilty for falling in love with Fernando.
18	"Una mujer libre"	3 March 2021	2.2
Alexa decides to divorce Joaquín and Gabriel is not in her plans either. Joaquín continues with the counterfeiting of the bills. Gabriel asks Dante for a job at the factory so he can get more information. Abel begins to woo Irene. Irene does business with Oléico. Sara discovers Joaquín kissing Paulina.
19	"Un buen negocio"	4 March 2021	2.2
Commander Nicolás organizes an operation to capture Joaquín "El falcón" and he is wounded in his arm. Gabriel questions Alexa about her divorce and her feelings but Soco interrupts them. Joaquín manages to escape from the police. Fernando confesses to Irene how happy she makes him to be by his side; Irene assures him that she feels the same, but that their love is impossible. Dante confronts Joaquín for continuing with the illicit business.
20	"Alexa está embarazada"	5 March 2021	2.1
Alexa decides to leave the house and says goodbye to Gabriel, but he is sure that it is not the last time they will see each other. Alexa suffers a serious accident for which she must undergo emergency surgery. Tamara sets up a scene of jealousy for Fernando. The doctor informs the Ferrers that Alexa is pregnant and Dante and Joaquín jump with happiness.
21	"Joaquín abusó de mí"	8 March 2021	2.5
Dante informs Laura that they will soon be grandparents. Martina is sure that Joaquín is not going to allow him and Alexa to separate. Alexa denies being pregnant and assures Joaquín that having a child with him is not a reality between the two of them. Alexa accuses Joaquín of having taken advantage of her the day the oil was launched. Gabriel, Rodrigo and Irene confront Joaquín for what he did to Alexa.
22	"Alexa decide tener al bebé"	9 March 2021	2.4
Gabriel visits Alexa at the hospital and reiterates his support for the decision on whether or not she wants to have her child. Dante asks Joaquín to clear his name due to his wife's accusations. Joaquín visits Alexa in the hospital and she recriminates him for what he did to her. He excuses himself and does not plan to give her a divorce. Fernando visits Irene in the hospital and confesses that his relationship with Tamara ended. Irene regrets the news, but Fernando confesses his love for her.
23	"El accidente fue provocado"	10 March 2021	2.5
Commander Juárez discovers that Negrete is an infiltrator and makes it clear that he has evidence against him. Joaquín complains to Gabriel for having attacked him and assures him that if he gets into his life he will pay dearly. Laura confesses to Alfonso that she never had an abortion and her son was born. Gabriel finds evidence that blames Joaquín for Alexa's accident.
24	"Una acusación muy seria"	11 March 2021	2.6
Gabriel makes Alexa doubt about Joaquín's innocence regarding the accidents she has suffered lately, including the death of her parents. Laura encourages Martina to acknowledge her love for Gabriel. Alexa unburdens herself with Irene and tells her that she would like to know who Joaquín really is. Rodrigo continues his research on Heriberto.
25	"Tengo que tenerlo cerca"	12 March 2021	2.3
Martina learns to cook to conquer Gabriel. Joaquín takes revenge on Gabriel and causes an accident in the containers. Fernando surprises Irene with a romantic dinner and they make love. Joaquín sends Rodrigo to be beaten. Alexa decides to stay to look for evidence to help her get justice. Alexa receives gifts from Joaquín for her son but she asks Rodrigo for help to give them away. Joaquín mocks Gabriel for what happened to his container.
26	"Alexa amenaza a Joaquín"	15 March 2021	2.5
Not caring about Joaquín's intimidating words, Alexa threatens him with having the future of his son in her hands, as she will decide if he is born or not. Gabriel and Nicolas arrive at David's house, but upon entering they perceive a strong smell of gas, so they immediately start looking for him and unfortunately find him dead.
27	"Vamos a hacer justicia"	16 March 2021	2.3
Dante learns that Irene excluded Joaquín from the toast she organized, which provokes his fury. Martina reproaches Alexa for blaming Joaquín for rape because of the problems that her confession has caused in the family. Gabriel presents Alexa with the images of her assault and she has more evidence against Joaquín. Alexa does not plan to sit idly by and will do justice with the help of Gabriel.
28	"¡Voy a pelear!"	17 March 2021	2.5
Dante and Joaquín intend to ruin Irene's business. Dante decides not to divide the lands of Navojoa, so Irene declares war on him. Tamara discovers the romance between Fernando and Irene. Tamara vows to avenge the pain they caused her. Gerardo despises Aracely. Joaquín confesses to Dante that he ended David's life. Alexa discovers, thanks to Gabriel, that her parents were murdered.
29	"El monte de las ánimas"	18 March 2021	2.6
Gabriel discovers the place where Joaquín takes the traitors; the police find several bodies there. Adriano catches Irene making out with Fernando; They both try to defend themselves, but Adriano rejects them. Irene is very distressed for not knowing anything about her son but Rodrigo and Gabriel manage to find him. Joaquín doesn't understand how the police got to the mountain of souls. Dante and Joaquín complain to Rodrigo for being Irene's friend, so they give him a settlement check for his services at the factory.
30	"No hay enemigo pequeño"	19 March 2021	2.3
Gabriel learns that his brother is dead and vows revenge on those who killed his brother. With the help of Martina, Laura tries to get Joaquín back, but he only feels ashamed for her. Irene orders an audit of the Ferrer factory; Joaquín assures that she will pay dearly for her betrayal. Joaquín gives Alexa 24 hours to return to the house or her loved ones will pay.
31	"El destino quiere que estemos juntos"	22 March 2021	2.3
Rodrigo, with the help of his therapy, little by little assimilates the abuse he suffered in his childhood. Irene tries to talk to Tamara, but she only teases her love rival. Gabriel promises to help Alexa in her search for justice and also vows to love only her. Irene complains to Fernando for not telling her about the job offer in Canada. Martina apologizes to Gabriel for everything that has happened between them and makes it clear that she does not want to lose their friendship. Irene wants to sell her invested part of the factory, Joaquín and Dante are furious. Alexa decides to return to the house to deceive Joaquín and find evidence against him, but Gabriel does not accept the decision.
32	"No hay latido de corazón"	23 March 2021	2.4
Alexa informs Irene that she will return with Joaquín to the house, she does not fully understand her decision but supports her. Alexa returns to the Ferrer house to apologize to Joaquín and he humiliates her in front of everyone. Cecy finds Aracely at home with her lover, the two have a strong argument. Katia's period is late and does not know if she is pregnant. Alexa suffers severe pain and asks Gabriel for help, he takes her to the hospital and they inform her that she suffered a miscarriage. Negrete is murdered in jail.
33	"Nada está bien"	24 March 2021	2.2
Fernando looks for Tamara and assures her that he never cheated on her and asks her not to bother Irene anymore. In therapy, Rodrigo relives the abuse he suffered from Heriberto. Gabriel helps Alexa so that Joaquín does not discover that she left the house. Joaquín is annoyed when he sees Gabriel carrying his wife. Dante finds Irene with Fernando and attacks them, but both defend their love. Gabriel helps Alexa in her depression after the miscarriage she suffered. Adriano does not want to return to the surf team.
34	"Quiero que muera de amor por mí"	25 March 2021	2.1
Fernando makes it clear to Irene that he will fight for her love. Alexa remains very depressed about losing her baby. Gabriel suffers from not being able to take care of Alexa and kisses her, but assures her that he will always be there for her. Gabriel thanks Cecy for helping him with Alexa's depression. Martina is determined to do everything in order to win Gabriel over and asks Alexa to tell her how to make him fall in love. Pilar complains to Dante for blocking Rodrigo's career. Pilar discovers Rodrigo's secret when he confronts Heriberto for having abused him.
35	"Hasta las últimas consecuencias"	26 March 2021	2.2
Rodrigo, with Pilar and Gabriel's help, won't rest until they make Heriberto pay for what he did to Rodrigo. Adriano is willing to support Katia with the decision she makes about the baby she is expecting. Alexa suffers for being at Joaquín's side and continues to pretend in front of Joaquín that she is still pregnant. With the help of Cecy, Gabriel sends a small detail to Alexa and they both want to be together. Pilar shows all her support for Rodrigo. Irene and Fernando spend a romantic moment diving together in the sea.
36	"Tu mejor opción"	29 March 2021	1.9
Dante in order to get revenge on his sister shows all his support for Adriano and offers him to live in the house. Alexa and Gabriel are talking in her room and Joaquín comes to look for her. Irene supports Pilar. Laura and Alfonso give each other a big kiss. Fernando confronts Tamara for the meme she posted about Irene. Pilar confesses to Dante the abuse Rodrigo suffered. Adriano leaves his house, but when he mocks his mother, she slaps him.
37	"Te devuelvo tu libertad"	30 March 2021	2.2
Gabriel is sure that Alexa is jealous of his relationship with Martina and kisses her. Araceli and Gerardo about to cross the border. Fernando decides to break up with Irene when he sees her suffer from Adriano's rejection. Laura and Alfonso continue enjoying their love. Joaquin and Dante fear that the Ave Fénix will throw them upside down in the business. Alfonso suspects that Joaquín has something to do with Samuel 'Ave Fénix'.
38	"No me sueltes nunca"	31 March 2021	N/A
Rodrigo reunites with his former classmates and they will do everything to put Heriberto in jail. Alexa wants to know what Joaquín and Dante's illicit business is. Alexa and Gabriel escape to a beach. Martina is very proud of Rodrigo's attitude. Alexa and Gabriel ignite the passion and make a promise on the beach. Alfonso declares himself to Laura. Rodrigo and Martina walk through Mexico City.
39	"Araceli es perseguida por la migra"	1 April 2021	1.8
Araceli and Gerardo are about to cross the border. Irene suffers from Adriano's despise and Alexa and Gabriel can't stop thinking about what they experienced on the beach. Rodrigo and Martina are closer together and he begins to fall in love with her. Baldomero and Cari ignite in passion. Araceli and Gerardo escape the police and end up stranded in the desert. Pilar sees Gabriel leave Alexa's room. Dante orders Alfonso to be investigated because he wants him away from Laura.
40	"Divide y vencerás"	2 April 2021	1.9
Martina and Rodrigo agree to continue supporting each other in everything. Martina alerts Adriano. Baldomero continues to disturb Caridad. Alexa and Gabriel know that they are soul mates, but Martina could change their destiny very soon. Pilar makes Dante see that he must not consent to Adriano or else he will make the same mistake he made with his children. Alfonso continues to be romantic and surprises Laura once again. Adriano wants to see the Halcón. Dante will seek revenge on Alfonso. After being bitten by a cobra in the desert, Gerardo dies in Araceli's arms. Martina gives Gabriel shocking news.
41	"Martina está embarazada"	5 April 2021	2.1
Alexa is surprised to learn that Martina might be pregnant and suggests taking a pregnancy test. Dante is willing to pay for a coach for Adriano to compete in Hawaii. Alexa asks Gabriel to stop being intimate with Martina or else their relationship will end. Martina confirms that she is pregnant, but does not know whether to keep the baby. Gabriel confesses to Alexa that he will support Martina with the baby.
42	"¿Cuánto quieres por tu hijo?"	6 April 2021	2.1
Joaquín mocks Rodrigo after learning that he suffered abuse, but Rodrigo puts him in his place. Parents demand that teacher Heriberto leave school and pay for the abuse he committed. Alexa can't stand the idea of Gabriel having a child with Martina. Heriberto does everything to escape. Irene will not allow Dante to fool her with the evaluation of the lands. Dante offers Martina a large sum of money for her baby, but she does not accept.
43	"¿Querías ver al Halcón?"	7 April 2021	1.9
Dante confronts Laura about the son she had in the past/ Adriano is about to meet the Halcón. Martina receives support from Alexa and suggests that she take the opportunity to be a mother. Gabriel kisses Alexa and assures her that he is only supporting Martina. Adriano suffers when he remembers that his mother told him that she did not trust Joaquín and remembers how Pilar advised him not to abandon Irene.
44	"No hay latidos del corazón"	8 April 2021	N/A
Joaquín makes an appointment with the gynecologist without Alexa's consent, who is nervous to learn that he may discover that she is no longer pregnant. Gabriel accompanies Martina to have an ultrasound done but the doctor tells them that she cannot hear the baby's heartbeat. Martina tells her mother that Gabriel was very affectionate after accompanying her to the hospital where they found out that they lost their baby.
45	"¿Quién eres Gabriel?"	9 April 2021	2.3
Cecilia tells Tomás that she and her mother decided to get away from the little girl so that he can be calm but he gives her terrible news. Alexa is very scared while the doctor does the ultrasound but Gabriel makes a move to fool Joaquín. Martina lets Gabriel know that she does not want to be with anyone else and that she is in love with him but he replies that love takes two and he cannot reciprocate.
46	"Un lobo con piel de oveja"	12 April 2021	1.9
Pilar confronts Heriberto for what he did to her son. Rodrigo suffers when he learns that Martina used him to make Gabriel jealous. Dante feels bad, passes out and rolls down the stairs, Alexa witnesses the accident and takes him to the hospital.
47	"Humberto abusa de Cecilia"	13 April 2021	2.1
Humberto drugs Cecilia and takes advantage of her. Tamara takes advantage of the cameras at the foundation's inauguration to kiss Fernando. Dante asks Joaquín to take care of Adriano and avoid getting him into the family's illicit businesses, Adriano listens to them. Martina suspects that a woman stole her husband.
48	"Estás fuera del caso"	14 April 2021	2.3
Cecilia finds out that she was drugged but was not abused. Adriano is in Joaquín's hands. Alfonso dispenses with Gabriel's collaboration in the investigation when he learns that he is Alexa's lover. Tamara meets Joaquín and commits an indiscretion about Alexa.
49	"Encerrada como en una cárcel"	15 April 2021	2.2
Joaquín explodes before all the Ferrers for causing Alexa to disobey his orders and Gabriel asks him to respect the women of the house. Gabriel and Alexa indulge in passion and together they trust that Joaquín will pay for what he has done. Dante and Alfonso confront each other. Adriano is in danger of death.
50	"Adriano muere en brazos de Irene"	16 April 2021	1.9
Someone surprises Adriano and pushes him causing a terrible accident. Alfonso begins to investigate what happened to Adriano. After being seriously ill in the hospital, Adriano wakes up and asks to see Irene, but when she arrives, he takes his last breath.
51	"¿Por qué te fuiste mi niño?"	19 April 2021	2.4
In addition to Irene, all the Ferrers are devastated by Adriano's death. Alfonso investigates what happened and who killed Adriano. Katia confesses to Irene that she is pregnant during Adriano's funeral and Irene suggests that she stay and live with her so that they can raise the baby together.
52	"Presunto culpable"	20 April 2021	2.2
Tamara denounces Fernando as Adriano's murderer. Irene is excited about Katia coming to her home to raise her grandson. Alfonso arrests Fernando for being presumed guilty of Adriano's death. Joaquín tries to seduce Alexa.
53	"Joaquín mató a Adriano"	21 April 2021	2.3
Irene visits Fernando in jail, he swears that he is innocent. Joaquín and Dante assure that Fernando can be guilty. Joaquín confesses his happiness at having removed Adriano from his path. Irene confronts Tamara. Rodrigo discovers that Alexa and Gabriel are lovers.
54	"Con un pie en la tumba"	22 April 2021	2.3
Gabriel explodes when he learns that Joaquín abused Alexa. Fernando is transferred to prison. Alfonso and Laura perform a DNA test using Fernando's hair. Dante already knows that Joaquín continues with the counterfeiting of bills, so he puts him in his place, El Halcón mocks his father and Dante suffers an attack.
55	"Dante sufre una embolia"	23 April 2021	2.3
Dante is paralyzed on the left side. All the Ferrers find out that Dante's days are numbered. Tamara and Joaquín indulge in passion, but he brings out his macho side to his lover. Irene visits Fernando in prison. Rubén threatens Joaquín.
56	"Sé que tú y Alexa son amantes"	26 April 2021	1.9
Joaquín asks Dante to change his attitude with him. Dante apologizes to Rodrigo and wants him to return to the company and the house. Rodrigo confronts Gabriel about his relationship with Alexa. Someone threatens Joaquín with revealing that he killed Adriano.
57	"El perfecto culpable"	27 April 2021	2.2
Joaquín desperately searches for whoever sent him the video that blames him for Adriano's death. Fernando learns that Joaquín and Tamara are lovers and that they both planned his imprisonment. Gabriel tells Alexa that Rodrigo discovered them, so she asks him to keep his distance. Fernando fights in prison.
58	"Una madre desesperada"	28 April 2021	2.1
Joaquín complains to Gabriel for helping Fernando, but Gabriel does not allow him to intimidate him. Laura discovers that Fernando is her son so she is willing to blame herself for Adriano's death to save him.
59	"Cada acción tiene consecuencia"	29 April 2021	2.2
Joaquín takes Alexa to the gynecologist to find out the sex of her baby and she manages to fool him a second time. Alfonso confesses to Gabriel that Fernando is his son. Joaquín is wounded by Brian Wood's men. Fernando's trial begins. Caridad catches Baldomero kissing his wife, slaps him and calls him a liar.
60	"Tenemos que decirnos adiós"	30 April 2021	2.0
Paola shows strong evidence to free Fernando. Pilar asks Baldomero to leave the house for seducing and deceiving Caridad. Fernando, upon leaving prison, decides to end his relationship with Irene, in order to clear his name. Tamara is arrested for lying at trial and could spend several years in prison.
61	"Una decisión radical"	3 May 2021	2.0
Dante announces that he will sell all his properties, Joaquín disagrees. Tamara warns Joaquín that if he doesn't help her get out of prison, she will tell everyone that he was behind her statement. Upon realizing that Ceci told the truth, Gabriel decides to support her to make her report but soon after she changes her mind and everyone is taken aback.
62	"Paso a paso"	4 May 2021	2.3
Laura and Alfonso reveal to Irene that Fernando is their son. Ramiro is Joaquín's extortionist. Despite the fact that Joaquín gives his men precise instructions to catch the man who is extorting him, he escapes them. Upon awakening, Katia realizes that she is not at home so she complains to her mother, who tells her that they put her to sleep with chloroform because they knew of her plans to go live with Irene. Rubén's body is found.
63	"Atrapados en la tormenta"	5 May 2021	2.2
Dante is furious when he finds out that Rubén's body was found, so he tells Joaquín that mistakes are paid for in life and he is paying for them with him. Araceli calls Johnny to sort out her papers, but moments later the police see her sitting on the street and take her to jail. Alexa and Gabriel are left stranded in the heavy rain. Irene is jealous when she sees Paula with Fernando in Hawaii.
64	"Aquí va a haber una desgracia"	6 May 2021	2.1
Due to the heavy rain, Alexa and Gabriel are left without a car and isolated, so they decide to stay in a cabin where they unleash their passion. Joaquín looks for Alexa and Gabriel but when he sees that they do not arrive, he suspects that they were together, which they themselves confirm upon their return.
65	"Ajuste de cuentas"	7 May 2021	2.2
Laura reveals to Martina that she and Alfonso are Fernando's parents, so she is happy but is afraid of Dante and Joaquín's reaction. Gabriel meets with Ramiro to buy him some dollars, which confirms that he is the person who has been blackmailing Joaquín. Thanks to Alexa, the police find Joaquín's coat and interrogate him about Adriano's death. Irene manages to rescue Katia.
66	"Gabriel no se puede morir"	10 May 2021	1.8
Joaquín involves Baldomero in his business and threatens him. Martina will be the godmother of Alexa's baby. Gabriel suffers a terrible accident in a raid and his life is in danger. Alexa is almost caught showing her excessive concern for Gabriel. Martina asks her husband to fight for his life. Alexa suffers from not being able to see Gabriel.
67	"El corazón no entiende razones"	11 May 2021	2.4
Fernando and his surf team manage to take second place in Hawaii. Alfonso suggests that Alexa control herself so that her relationship with Gabriel is not discovered. Alexa begs Gabriel to fight for her life; he opens his eyes. While Ramiro testifies against Joaquín, Irene threatens him if she discovers that he killed Adriano.
68	"Hay amores que matan"	12 May 2021	2.6
Cecilia, with the support of Ramona and her mother, denounces Solís and Commander Alfonso arrests Humberto, accused of having abused Cecilia. Irene alerts Joaquín. Fernando feels guilty about spending the night with Paula, but she decides to fight for their love. Alexa manages to see Gabriel and he promises her that they will always be together. Dante apologizes to Laura for the damage done.
69	"¡Me abandonaste!"	13 May 2021	2.3
Paula is determined to join her life with Fernando's, so she makes him a shocking proposal. Joaquín helps Humberto Solís escape. Martina sets up a scene of jealousy for Gabriel. Laura and Alfonso reveal to Fernando that they are his parents, but he despises them.
70	"Fue un error casarme con él"	14 May 2021	2.2
Joaquín receives an anonymous one again and vows to take revenge on the person who is threatening him. Martina gets jealous when she sees Rodrigo with her friend. Soco confesses everything to Irene. Martina feels lonely as a woman and has Gabriel and Alexa investigated. Rafaela arrives at the house to help Dante sell his land, but Martina and Alexa get jealous when they learn that she was Gabriel's fiancée. The police ask Socorro to face Joaquín in a confrontation.
71	"Morder la mano que te da de comer"	17 May 2021	2.1
Dante looks for Alfonso to confront him and threatens him with a gun, but suffers a crisis and Alfonso decides to help him. Joaquín and Soco face off, he demands that the Ferrers fire Soco, but Dante prevents his arrogance. Joaquín threatens Irene with denouncing her for defamation.
72	"Entre la vida y la muerte"	18 May 2021	2.4
Martina looks for Fernando to be able to have a sibling relationship. Alexa is jealous when she knows that Gabriel will see Rafaela. Fernando faints from a terrible Pacific virus; Irene and Laura take care of him. Martina is jealous of Rafaela and also orders for her to be investigated.
73	"La última vez que nos vemos"	19 May 2021	2.4
Martina behaves rude to Rafaela when she sees her at home and Alexa feels insecure when she hears that Rafaela knows all of Gabriel's secrets. Irene is disappointed by Fernando's cheating with Paula. Dante has approximately six months to live, so he decides to put Pilar as the owner of his land. Fernando asks Paula not to get back together not even as friends.
74	"Dinero sucio"	20 May 2021	2.1
Dante asks Martina to help him fulfill his last will; both hug each other with love. Rodrigo celebrates his new job with Elisa and they end up being carried away by passion. Pilar discovers Dante's illicit business and decides to end their relationship forever. Fernando could go to Australia. Rafaela is determined to fight for Gabriel's love.
75	"Vender el alma al diablo"	21 May 2021	2.4
Pilar goes to Rodrigo's house and Dante faints after arguing with Pilar. Solís looks for Ceci to get revenge. Pilar does not want to talk to Irene, since she thinks that she is an accomplice of Joaquín and Dante. Solís enters Cecilia's house to burn her with acid. Irene confronts Dante and Joaquín for involving their lands in money laundering. Laura and Alfonso argue about Joaquín's situation.
76	"Esta familia se está cayendo a pedazos"	24 May 2021	2.4
Rodrigo looks for Dante to complain that he has hidden his dirty business from him and makes it clear to Joaquín that he is not afraid of him. Alfonso is removed from the case against Joaquín. Fernando assures Joaquín that he will pay for having killed Adriano. Martina does not understand what is happening in the house.
77	"Deseo cumplido, papito lindo"	25 May 2021	2.4
Rafaela suspects that Alexa is Gabriel's lover. Dante signs the contract for the sale of the house. Joaquín discovers that Dante has already sold the house, so he tries to kill him. Martina confronts Gabriel upon learning that he is a private investigator.
78	"Una muerte entre los olivos"	26 May 2021	2.5
Martina finds Dante dead and is heartbroken. Fernando looks for Irene to explain what happened with Paula. Fernando decides to give Laura and Alfonso a chance before going to Australia. Joaquín assumes his position as owner and lord of the house.
79	"Déjame cuidarte"	27 May 2021	2.3
Rafaela shows up at the funeral and Joaquín learns that she is in charge of selling the house. Joaquín says goodbye with some emotional words to his father. Gabriel and Alexa suspect that Joaquin killed Dante. Martina feels very lonely, but Rodrigo offers her protection and they kiss. Joaquín orders to occupy the bedroom that belonged to Dante as the new owner of the house.
80	"El heredero universal de Dante Ferrer"	28 May 2021	2.4
Irene accompanies Katia during the birth of her grandson. Martina confesses to Alexa that she kissed Rodrigo. Joaquín is very excited about the arrival of his son and surprises Alexa. The Ferrers meet to read Dante's will; everyone is shocked with his last will.
81	"Este juego ya lo perdiste"	31 May 2021	2.4
Martina is not willing to lose the Ferrer's money, so she confronts Rafaela to complain that she and Gabriel will plan everything to leave her and her brother without an inheritance. Joaquín completely loses his reason and shows that now the one who dominates his body is El Halcón. Joaquín gives orders to Gabriel, but, since Gabriel is now the heir, he fires Joaquín from the company.
82	"Alexa está muerta"	1 June 2021	2.6
Joaquín, through a confession from Rafaela, discovers that Alexa is not pregnant and orders her to be locked up; she runs away. Alexa suffers an accident when being chased by Joaquín's men. Gabriel confronts Rafaela for revealing the secret of the pregnancy and wishes to kill Joaquín for killing the woman he loves.
83	"Operativo para atrapar a Joaquín"	2 June 2021	2.7
Nicolás carries out the operation to arrest Joaquín, the police ambush him and he is injured. Gabriel confesses to Martina her brother's crimes. Martina, who already knows her Joaquín’s crimes, helps him stay safe.
84	"Alexa está viva"	3 June 2021	2.6
Laura tries to make her son reconsider to surrender, but he hits her with a vase; Martina is shocked. Alexa did not die in the attack, but upon being transferred to the hospital, Joaquín learns that she and Gabriel are lovers.
85	"Echar raíces"	4 June 2021	3.1
Martina complains to Gabriel and Alexa for having hidden that they were lovers. Joaquín is enraged when he learns that Alexa cheated on him with Gabriel. Gabriel gives Alexa a special origami arrangement and takes the opportunity to ask her to be his wife. Joaquín seeks revenge on Alexa and Gabriel and ends up kidnapping them. Irene and Fernando start a life together in Australia alongside Katia and her grandson. Alfonso and Nicolás receive great recognition. Laura is very happy for her son and her great love Alfonso. Joaquín ends his days in jail alongside all his accomplices. Martina fears that she could harm Rodrigo, but he asks her to let go and enjoy their love. Alexa and Gabriel get married in the church.
