= Huérfanas =

Mexican telenovela

- Created by: Adriano Numa; Gerardo Lazos; Carolina Rivera
- Developed by: Corazon TV and Azteca; Azteca Novelas: Alberto Santini Lara; Elisa Salinas
- Directed by: Walter Doehner; Victor Herrera; Karla Farjeat
- Starring: Ana Belena; Fernando Alonso; Ana Ciochetti; Mariana Torres; Ariel López Padilla
- Theme music composer: Alejandro Montalban, Eduardo Reyes
- Opening theme: "Cuando No Estás" by Cynthia
- Country of origin: Mexico
- Original language: Spanish
- No. of episodes: 120

Production
- Executive producer: Fernando Sariñara
- Producers: Emilia Lamonthe; Pedro Luevano; Alberto "Tito" Navarro; Omar Blanco
- Production location: Mexico City
- Editor: Javier D. Robert
- Camera setup: Multi-camera
- Running time: 42 minutes
- Production company: Azteca

Original release
- Network: Azteca Trece
- Release: 29 August 2011 – 17 February 2012

Huérfanas is a Mexican telenovela produced by Azteca. It stars Ana Belena & Fernando Alonso as the protagonists. Mariana Torres portrays a villain character for the first time. Other villains include Ana Ciochetti and Ariel López Padilla. Rodrigo Cachero, Carla Carillo, Lucia Leyba, Hugo Catalan, Eugenio Montessoro, Mayra Sierra, Rodrigo Murray and Gabriela Roel are also part of cast members. Fernando Ciangherotti and Veronica Merchant make a special appearance as the parents of the orphans. This telenovela will be produced by Corazon TV under Fernando Sariñana and Alberto Santini Lara for Azteca Novelas. The shooting of started on 18 May 2011. An original story by Adriano Numa ("Cosa de niños: Bullying" & "Venenos cotidianos"), directed by Walter Doehner (La Reina del Sur), this original telenovela is scheduled to air at 6:00pm on August 29, 2011 on Azteca13.

== Casts ==
Cast listing in opening credit order. Main cast (credited alone, or paired) in bold.

Actor	Character	Description
**Ana Belena**	Aralia	Protagonist. Eldest daughter of Ismael Montemayor.
**Fernando Alonso**	Rodrigo	Protagonist. Santina's son.
**Mariana Torres**	Maria Del Pilar Zahn "Maripili"	Villain.
**Anna Ciocchetti**	Lourdes	Villain
**Carla Carrillo**	Melina	Co-protagonist. Daughter of Ismael Montemayor.
**Lucía Leyba**	Diana	Co-protagonist. Daughter of Ismael Montemayor.
**Ariel López Padilla**	Cesar Davola	Main villain
**Francisco Angelini**	Fabrizio De la Pena	Aralia's ex-boyfriend
**Marcela Ruiz**	Viviana	
**Hugo Catalan**	Jonathan	
**Juan Pablo Campa**	Joaquin	
**Antonio Gaona**	Tomas Chavez	
**Cristian Paz**	Santiago	
**Julia Calzada**	Corina	killed by Cesar
Eligio Melendez	Don Jeronimo	
Tamara Guzman	Jacinta	
Maria Elena Olivares	'Doña Chonita'	
Pedro Mira	Diego Zahn	
Cesar Panini	Pablo Razo	killed by Yezmin and Cesar
Armando Pascual		
Luis Cardenas	Alvaro	
Irma Infante	Brigida	
Roberto Leyra		
Maria de la Luz Cendejas	Romina	killed to cancer
Keyla Wood	Aurora	
Saúl Hernández	Emiliano	
Melina Robert	Wanda Chavez	
Mayra Sierra	Yezmin	
**Gabriela Roel**	Santina	Rodrigo's mother. Nanny of the Montemayor sisters.
**Rodrigo Cachero**	Bradley	
**Veronica Merchant**	Ana Julia Allende	Special appearance. Mother of the Montemayor sisters.
**Fernando Ciangherotti**	Ismael Montemayor	Special appearance. Father of the Montemayor sisters.
**Eugenio Montessoro**	Antonio de la Peña	killed by Cesar and Lourdes
