= Anna Ciocchetti =

Spanish-born Mexican actress and singer

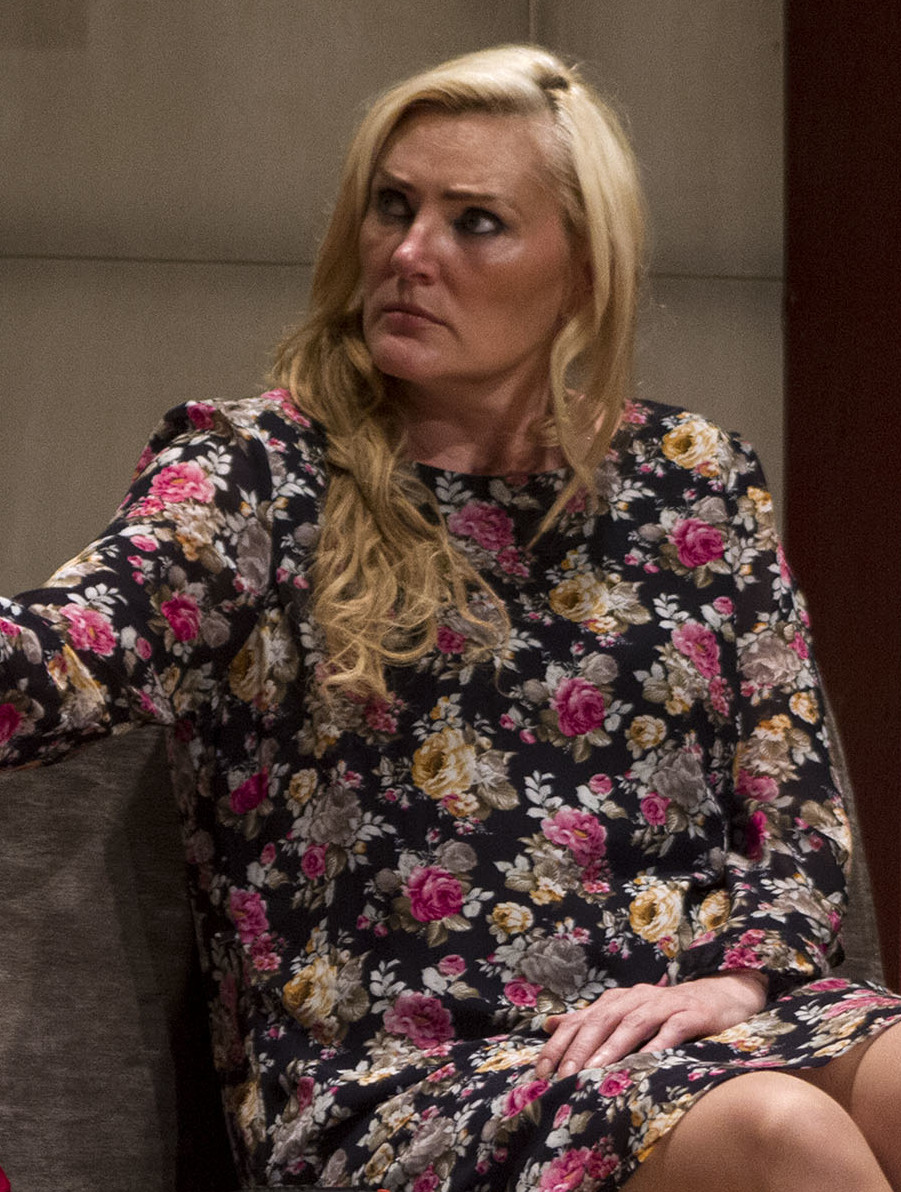
- Ciocchetti in 2015
- Born: Anna Ciocchetti Millán; June 24, 1968 (age 56); Madrid, Spain
- Occupation: Actress
- Spouses

Anna Ciocchetti Millán (born June 24, 1968, in Madrid) is a Spanish-born Mexican actress and singer.

== Early life and education ==
Her father Franco Ciocchetti was a jazz musician and she started as a singer with the band Dinamita. She later studied drama with Héctor Mendoza, at Vercelli Drama School and the Royal Academy of London.

== Filmography ==
=== Film ===
- 2006 : Así del precipicio : Sandra Romano
- 2006 : Sexo, amor y otras perversiones 2
- 2006 : El mago Manani
- 2005 : Bodas de oro : Sharon
- 2005 : Por eso no tienes novio
- 2004 : Cero y van 4 : Mónica
- 2003 : El pez dorado
- 1995 : El callejón de los milagros

=== Television ===
Year	Title	Role	Notes
1986	La telaraña		
1989	Mi segunda madre	Ana María	
1990	Alcanzar una estrella	Sharon	
1993	Televiteatros		3 episodes
1994	Entre vivos y muertos		
1996	A flor de piel	Ángela	
1996	Nada personal	Elsa Grajales	
1998	La chacala	Marina	
2000	Todo por amor	Regina	
2001	Lo que es el amor	Anabel Cantú	
2003	Mirada de mujer: El regreso	Sara	
2004	Belinda	Lucrecia Arismendi	
2005	Corazón partido	Fernanda	
2006	Campeones de la vida	Miriam	
2007	Mientras Haya Vida	Marion	
2007	Cambio de vida		
2009	Vuélveme a querer	Lorenza Montesinos	
2010	La Loba	Noelia	
2011	Huérfanas	Lourdes de la Peña	
2013	Fortuna	Minerva Constant de Altamirano	
2013	Prohibido Amar	Alicia Cosío	
2016	Despertar contigo	Cynthia Madrigal / Isaura Hidalgo de Reyna	
2017	Como dice el dicho	Kenia	Episode: "Fácil es empezar y difícil perseverar"
2017	Hoy voy a cambiar	Fanny Schatz	
2017	Caer en tentación	Azucena	
2017	Érase una vez	Lucía	Episode: "Blanca Nieves"
2019	La Reina del Sur	Marietta Lancaster	Season 2
2020	Sin miedo a la verdad	General Brigadier Mora	Season 3
2021	Contigo sí	Cristina	
2022	La herencia	Catalina Arango	6 episodes
2022	Lotería del crimen	Constanza	Episode: "El Fotógrafo"
2024	Marea de pasiones	Isela Grajales de Marrero	
