= TVyNovelas Award for Best Cast =

Mexican television award

- Awarded for: Best cast of each telenovela
- First award: 2015; Yo no creo en los hombres
- Currently held by: 2019; Amar a muerte

The TVyNovelas Award for Best Cast category is in the annual Premios TVyNovelas awards program for Mexican telenovelas (soap operas).

While the TVyNovelas Awards were established and begun in 1983, the Best Cast award was first given in 2015.

== Winners and nominees ==
=== 2010s ===
Winner		Nominated
33rd TVyNovelas Awards
2015	Yo no creo en los hombres	El color de la pasión; Lo que la vida me robó; Mi corazón es tuyo; Qué pobres tan ricos
34th TVyNovelas Awards
	Pasión y poder	A que no me dejas; Antes muerta que Lichita; La sombra del pasado; La vecina
35th TVyNovelas Awards
	La candidata	Despertar contigo; El hotel de los secretos; Las amazonas; Tres veces Ana
36th TVyNovelas Awards
	Caer en tentación	La doble vida de Estela Carrillo; Me declaro culpable; Mi marido tiene familia; Papá a toda madre
37th TVyNovelas Awards
	Amar a muerte	Hijas de la luna; La Piloto; Mi marido tiene familia; Por amar sin ley

=== 2020s ===
Winner	Nominated
38th TVyNovelas Awards: Los Favoritos del Público
El corazón nunca se equivoca	Médicos, línea de vida; Por amar sin ley; Soltero con hijas; Vencer el miedo; La usurpadora; Ringo; Cita a ciegas; Cuna de lobos; La reina soy yo; Silvia Pinal, frente a ti; Sin miedo a la verdad; Los elegidos; Hoy; ¡Cuéntamelo ya!; Más Noche; Me caigo de risa; Lorenza, bebé a bordo; Una familia de diez; Simón dice; Renta congelada; Nosotros los guapos; La Parodia; Vecinos; Inseparables: amor al límite; Pequeños gigantes; ¿Quién es la máscara?

== See also ==
TVyNovelas Awards categories
