= Catarina Rebelo =

Portuguese actress

- Born: Catarina de Oliveira Lopes Rebelo; October 14, 1997 (age 28); Lisbon, Portugal
- Citizenship: Portuguese
- Occupation: Actress
- Years active: 2007–present

Catarina de Oliveira Lopes Rebelo (born October 14, 1997) is a Portuguese actress.

She has participated in Mar Salgado, a 2014 telenovela nominated for "Best Telenovela" in 2015 at the International Emmy Awards of the International Academy of Television Arts & Sciences that recognizes excellence in television programming produced outside the U.S.

== Filmography ==
=== TV ===
- 2007 - Chiquititas, "Anita"
- 2008 - Feitiço de Amor, "Maria Sacramento"
- 2009 - Ele é Ela, "Olívia Raínha"
- 2011 - Remédio Santo, Participação Especial
- 2012 - Jogos Cruéis - Telefilme , “Marta”
- 2013 - I Love It, "Jéssica Costa"
- 2014 - Mar Salgado, "Frederica 'Kika' Queiroz"
- 2016 - Terapia, "Sofia"
- 2017 - Amor Maior, "Marta Resende Borges"
- 2019 - Amar Depois de Amar, “Alice Macedo”
- 2020 - Terra Nova, “Mariana”
- 2020 - Amar Demais, “Joana Campos”
- 2022 - Praxx, "Diana"
- 2023 - Emília, "Rosa"
- 2023 - Queridos Papás, Ema Valente

=== Cinema ===
- 2011 - Curta Metragem - Verão Invencível, “Joana” de Hugo Diogo
- 2016 - A Mãe é que Sabe, "Daniela" de Nuno Rocha

=== Teatro ===
- 2016 - Quase Adaptação de Patrick Marber, encenação: Vera Gromicho
- 2019 - Beginners Adaptação de Tim Crouch, encenação: Jorge Costa
