= Carlos Ferro (Mexican actor) =

Mexican actor

- Born: Carlos Mauricio Ferro Fernández; July 5, 1984 (age 42); Torreón, Coahuila de Zaragoza, Mexico
- Occupations: Television actor, music video director
- Years active: 2005–present

Carlos Mauricio Ferro Fernández (born July 5, 1984) is a Mexican television actor and music video director. He was born in Torreón, Coahuila de Zaragoza.

== Filmography ==
| Year | Title | Roles | Notes |
|---|---|---|---|
| 2010 | Más sabe el diablo: El primer golpe | Gregorio Ramírez | Direct-to-DVD; prequel to novela |
| 2019 | La boda de mi mejor amigo | Manuel | |
| 2024 | El roomie | Julio | |

=== Television roles ===
| Year | Title | Roles | Notes |
|---|---|---|---|
| 2005–2006 | Rebelde | Carlos Mendoza | 3 episodes |
| 2007 | Dame chocolate | José's friend | 2 episodes |
| 2009 | Más sabe el diablo | Gregorio Ramírez | 1 episode |
| 2010 | Perro amor | Benny Caparroso "El Pastelito" | 108 episodes |
| 2010 | Eva Luna | Carlos Maldonado | 108 episodes |
| 2011 | Mi corazón insiste en Lola Volcán | Camilo Andrade | 121 episodes |
| 2012 | Relaciones peligrosas | Santiago Madrazo | 2 episodes |
| 2013–2014 | De que te quiero, te quiero | Alonso Cortés | 174 episodes |
| 2014 | Reina de corazones | Lázaro Leiva | 140 episodes |
| 2015–2016 | Bajo el mismo cielo | Matías Morales | 16 episodes |
| 2016–2017 | Vuelve temprano | Agent Manuel Carvallo | 100 episodes |
| 2017 | Érase una vez | Marco Thierón | Episode: "La bella y la bestia" |
| 2017 | La fiscal de hierro | Joaquín Muñoz | 39 episodes |
| 2017–2018 | Caer en tentación | Santiago Álvarado | 103 episodes |
| 2018 | Mi marido tiene familia | Rodolfo | 1 episode |
| 2018 | La jefa del campeón | Daniel Rodríguez "La Bomba" | 61 episodes |
| 2019 | Los elegidos | Mario García | 33 episodes |
| 2021 | Fuego ardiente | Gabriel Montemayor | 85 episodes |
| 2023 | Vencer la culpa | Franco | 80 episodes |
| 2024 | Mujeres asesinas | Guillermo | Episode: "Rosario" |
| 2024 | Ligeramente diva | Alejandro Díaz del Castillo | 60 episodes |
| 2024 | La historia de Juana | Bruno | Guest star |
| 2026 | Top Chef VIP | Himself | Contestant (season 5) |

== Awards and nominations ==
| Year | Award | Work | Category | Result |
|---|---|---|---|---|
| 2011 | People en Español | Mi Corazón Insiste en Lola Volcán | Best Supporting Actor | Nominated |
| 2012 | Miami Life Awards | Relaciones Peligrosas | Best Supporting Actor of telenovela | Nominated |
| 2018 | TVyNovelas Awards | Caer en tentación | Best Co-lead Actor | Won |

== Accolades ==
| Year | Magazine / Awards | Category |
|---|---|---|
| 2010 | Quién | "The sexiest men" |
| 2011 | Cosmopolitan en Español | "Cosmo hombres" |
