= Gabriela Roel =

Mexican film and television actress (born 1959)

- Born: 13 December 1959 (age 65); Delicias, Chihuahua, Mexico
- Occupation(s): Television and film actress

Gabriela Roel (born 13 December 1959) is a Mexican film and television actress.

== Filmography ==
=== Film ===
- V/H/S/85 (2023)
- Incomplete Lovers (2022)
- Pecados de una profesora (2008)
- Mejor es que Gabriela no se muera (2007)
- Un encuentro ausente (2006)
- Mujer alabastrina (2006)
- La redención de Matilde (2003)
- Asesino en serio (2002)
- Demasiado amor (2001)
- El cometa (1998)
- Ámbar (1997)
- Katuwira, donde nacen y mueren los sueños (1996)
- El jardín del Edén (1994)
- En medio de la nada (1993)
- Tirano Banderas (1993)
- Bandidos (1991)
- Ciudad de ciegos (1990)
- Pueblo de madera (1990)
- Intimidades de un cuarto de baño (1989)
- Old Gringo (1989)
- Azul celeste (1988)
- El Dorado (1988)
- El tres de copas (1986)
- Amor a la vuelta de la esquina (1985)
- Tacos de oro (1985)
- Viaje al paraíso (1985)

=== Television ===
Television roles
Year	Title	Role	Notes
1986-87	Pobre juventud	Rosario	
1988	Miami Vice	Lucia Meron	Episode: "Borrasca" (S5, E5)
1990	Días sin luna	Silvia Parlange	
1991	Yo no creo en los hombres	María Dolores Robledo	
1993	Clarisa	Clarisa González León	
1995-96	Con toda el alma	Milagros Sarmiento	
1997-98	Demasiado corazón	Sandra Quiroz	
1999-00	La vida en el espejo	Raquel Carmona	
2001	Cara o cruz	Claudette	
2002	Agua y aceite	Silvia	
2002-03	Súbete a mi moto	Laura	
2003-04	Amor Descarado	Matilde García	
2004	Prisionera	Milagros Santos	
2006	Campeones de la vida	Minerva "Mimí"	
2008	Capadocia	Zaide Luján	
2008-09	Secretos del alma	Virginia Cervantes	
2009-10	Pobre Diabla	Carmen	
2011	Huérfanas	Herself	
2010	La loba	María Segovia / Lucrecia Aragonés del Águila "La Princesa"	
2011	Huérfanas	Santina Álvarez	
2013	Vivir a destiempo	Eleonora Campos	
2014	Siempre tuya Acapulco	Eufrasia Pérez	
2015-16	El Dandy	María Luisa	
2016	Hasta que te conocí	Doña Brígida	
2016-17	La Doña	Azucena Aguirre	
2017	Hoy voy a cambiar	Adult Lupita D'Alessio	
2018-2021	Falsa identidad	Felipa	
