= Mariana Torres (actress) =

Mexican actress (born 1985)

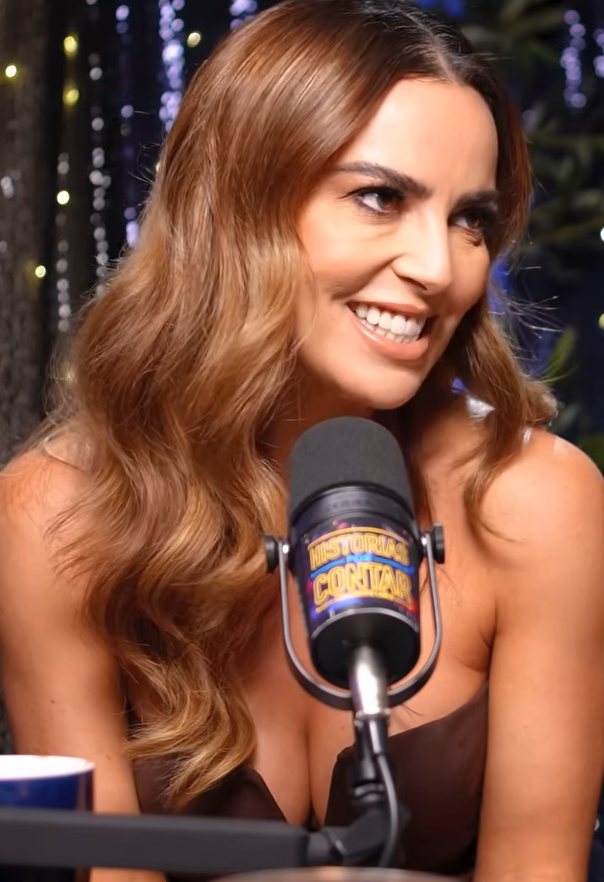
- Torres in 2025
- Born: Mariana Paulina Torres González; 5 December 1985 (age 40); Leon, Guanajuato, Mexico
- Occupation: Actress
- Years active: 2001–present

Mariana Paulina Torres González (Spanish pronunciation: [maˈɾjana ˈtores]; born December 5, 1985, in León, Guanajuato, Mexico) is a Mexican actress, known for telenovelas. She is a daughter of José Torres and she has 4 brothers.

== Biography ==
She debuted as actress in 2001 her native Mexico working in TV Azteca produced serials, and obtained her first leading role in a telenovela by the name of Belinda in 2004.

Most recently she has lived in Miami, Florida, where she has participated in three telenovelas produced there in Pecados Ajenos, Acorralada and Sacrificio de Mujer.

== Filmography ==
Television roles
Year	Title	Roles	Notes
2001	Como en el cine	Gloria	
2002	Por ti	Marisol Aldana	
2003	Dos chicos de cuidado en la ciudad	Paty Rodríguez	Recurring role; 160 episodes
2004	Belinda	Belinda Arismendi	Main role; 105 episodes
2006	Olvidarte jamás	Carolina Montero	Recurring role; 112 episodes
2007	Acorralada	Gabriela "Gaby" Soriano	Recurring role; 187 episodes
2007–2008	Pecados ajenos	Denisse Torres	Recurring role; 158 episodes
2009	Vuélveme a querer	Mariana Montesinos	Main role; 139 episodes
2009	Decisiones extremas	Valentina Morant	Episode: "Amor Pandillero (Gangster Love)"
2011	Sacrificio de mujer	Milagros Exposito / Dolores Vilarte	Recurring role
2011	Huérfanas	María Del Pilar Sáenz	Main role
2015	Así en el barrio como en el cielo	Jacky López	Recurring role
2016	Un día cualquiera	Luciana	Episode: "Desorden de identidad de la integridad corporal"
2017	Hoy voy a cambiar	Young Lupita D'Alessio	Main role
2019	Ringo	Julia Garay	Main role
2021	Fuego ardiente	Alexa Gamba	Main role
