= El nudo =

Television series

- Genre: Drama; Thriller
- Created by: Nuria Bueno
- Based on: Amar después de amar by Erika Halvorsen and Gonzalo Demaría
- Directed by: Jordi Frades; Salvador García; Kiko Ruiz Claverol
- Starring: Cristina Plazas; Miquel Fernández; Oriol Tarrasón; Natalia Verbeke
- Country of origin: Spain
- Original language: Spanish
- No. of seasons: 1
- No. of episodes: 13

Production
- Executive producers: Sonia Martínez; Jaume Banacolocha; Montse García
- Running time: c. 50 min
- Production companies: Atresmedia; Diagonal TV

Original release
- Network: ATRESplayer Premium
- Release: 24 November 2019 – 16 February 2020

El nudo is a Spanish thriller drama television series starring Cristina Plazas, Miquel Fernández, Oriol Tarrasón and Natalia Verbeke which consists of an adaptation of the Argentine series Amar después de amar. Produced by Atresmedia in collaboration with Diagonal TV, it originally aired from to November 2019 to February 2020 on Atresplayer Premium.

== Premise ==
The fiction follows two troubled marriages, formed by Cristina and Sergio and Rebeca and Daniel. The plot starts with a car accident involving Daniel in which another woman was present, upsetting the second of the marriages.

== Cast ==
- Cristina Plazas as Rebeca.
- Miquel Fernández as Sergio.
- Oriol Tarrasón as Daniel.
- Natalia Verbeke as Cristina.
- Luisa Gavasa as Miriam.
- Enrique Villén as Godoy.
- Armando del Río as Javier.
- Silvia Maya as Cynthia.
- Pep Antón Muñoz as Alberto Bécker.
- Eva Rufo as Nerea.
- Berta Galo as Mía.
- Astrid Janer as Lola.
- Marcos Ruiz as Nico.
- Rafa Ortiz as Andrés Bécker.
- Javier Morgade as Fede.
- Mariona Tena as Joanna.
- Ángel Ruiz as Elio del Arco.

== Production and release ==
El nudo is a remake of the Argentine series Amar después de amar, created by Erika Halvorsen and Gonzalo Demaría and produced by Atresmedia in collaboration with Diagonal TV. The writing team, coordinated by Nuria Bueno, was formed by José Ángel Lavilla, Nicolás Romero and Nacho Pérez de la Paz. The directors were Jordi Frades, Salvador García and Kiko Ruiz Claverol. Sonia Martínez, Jaume Banacolocha and Montse García were credited as executive producers.

The series was primarily shot in location in the Community of Madrid and the Province of Segovia. Production wrapped in October 2019 after 5 months of filming.

The series was presented at the FesTVal in September 2019. Consisting of 13 episodes featuring a running time of around 50 minutes, El nudo premiered on 24 November 2019 on Atresplayer Premium, becoming the platform's first original series. The broadcasting run ended on 16 February 2020.

Series	Episodes	Originally released			Ref.
Series	Episodes	First released	Last released	Network	Ref.
1	13	24 November 2019	16 February 2020	ATRESplayer Premium	

No. in season	Title	Original release date
1	"Veritas solve"	24 November 2019
2	"¿Quién eras?"	1 December 2019
3	"Hambre"	8 December 2019
4	"Herencia"	15 December 2019
5	"Despedida"	22 December 2019
6	"Mentira"	29 December 2019
7	"Peligro"	5 January 2020
8	"Sospecha"	12 January 2020
9	"Confianza"	19 January 2020
10	"Amor"	26 January 2020
11	"Miedo"	2 February 2020
12	"Verdad"	9 February 2020
13	"Veritas Solve?"	16 February 2020
