= Ferdinando Valencia =

Mexican actor

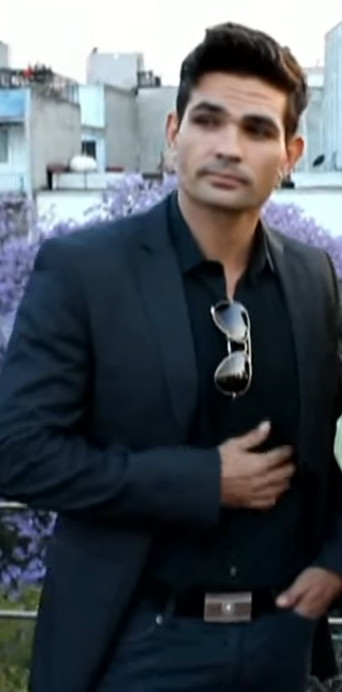
- Valencia in April 2012
- Born: Ferdinando Martínez Valencia; April 15, 1982 (age 43); Comala, Colima, Mexico
- Occupation: Actor
- Years active: 2006-present
- Children: 3

Ferdinando Martínez Valencia (born on April 15, 1982) also known as Ferdinando Valencia is a Mexican actor.

== Television roles ==
Title	Year	Role	Notes
Código postal	2006–07	Guillermo "Memo" De Alba Fernández	
Tormenta en el paraíso	2007	Lizandro	
En nombre del amor	2008–09	Germán Altamirano	
Hasta que el dinero nos separe	2009–10	El Rizos	
Camaleones	2009–10	Patricio Calderón	
Locas de amor	2010	Franco	
Cuando me enamoro	2010–11	José María "Chema" Casillas	
La fuerza del destino	2011	Saúl Mondragón	
Por ella soy Eva	2012	Renato Camargo	
Mentir para vivir	2013	Berto Martín	
Lo que la vida me robó	2013–14	Adolfo	Also starring; 144 episodes
Que te perdone Dios	2015	Diego	Also starring; 101 episodes
Simplemente María	2015–16	Cristóbal	Main role; 126 episodes
Hoy voy a cambiar	2017	José Vargas	Main role
Como tú no hay 2	2020	Damián Fuentes	Main role
La mexicana y el güero	2021	Sebastián de la Mora	
Vencer el pasado	2021	Javier Mascaró	Main role
Vuelve a mí	2023	Braulio Zepeda	Main role
Papás por conveniencia	2024	Guzmán	
Mi verdad oculta	2025	Iñigo Lizárraga Arenas	Main role

== Discography ==
- Camaleones (band)
