= Amar Depois de Amar =

- Genre: Romance, Melodrama, Action
- Created by: Catarina Peixoto; Helena Amaral
- Developed by: Plural Entertainment
- Starring: Maria João Pinho; Pedro Lima; Filipe Vargas; Dina Félix da Costa; Fernanda Serrano; Pedro Teixeira (see more)
- Opening theme: "Honey" by Noble
- Ending theme: "Honey" by Noble
- Country of origin: Portugal
- Original language: Portuguese
- No. of episodes: 68

Production
- Running time: ± 55min

Original release
- Network: TVI
- Release: June 17 – September 13, 2019

Related
- Amar después de amar

Amar Depois de Amar (English: Love after Loving) is a Portuguese telenovela broadcast and produced by TVI. It is written by and adapted from the Argentine telenovela Amar después de amar. The telenovela premiered on June 17, 2019 and ended on September 13, 2019.

== Plot ==
«Amar Depois de Amar» tells the story of four great passions and the crime they unleash between the Macedo family and the Oliveira family.

Raquel Macedo (Maria João Pinho) and Gonçalo Macedo (Pedro Lima) are happy, have been married for 20 years and have two twin sons: Frederico (Gonçalo Norton) and Alice (Catarina Rebelo). Gonçalo is a majority partner in an oyster nursery company and a fish and seafood distribution factory. Rich heir, disputes control of the company with his cousin and minority partner, André, who blackmails and swindles him.

Gonçalo's mother, Matilde (Helena Isabel), always disregarded her daughter-in-law for her lightness of mind and carelessness. When Gonçalo has an accident that puts him in a coma, Matilde will do his best to "get rid of" her and to take control of the family business.

Marina Oliveira (Dina Félix da Costa) and Augusto Oliveira (Filipe Vargas), also married for 20 years, have two teenage children: Catarina (Carolina Frias) and Nicolau (Bernardo Lobo Faria). In keeping with the family harmony that they both cherish, the couple have been trying to forget about their professional frustrations: Augusto is a contractor but would like to be a PJ inspector, as he had been before, and Marina wanted to be a ballroom dancer - where she had a future, above all, as a tango dancer - an activity she abandoned because of her children. She will still have a third child “out of time”, which will prevent her from starting over at a later age.

The two couples know each other and, initially against the wishes of Augusto, whom Gonçalo's wealth bothers, and Gonçalo, whom the intimacy between Raquel and Marina bothers, become inseparable friends. Raquel finds in Marina her missing friend, but Gonçalo will also find in her an overwhelming and corresponding passion.

The love between the two, which they both believe to be an absolute secret, will come to light when they suffer an attack and a car accident. Marina dies and Gonçalo is in a coma.

A police investigation is born here that leads us to meet almost every character. As it turns out, they could all have reason to have committed this crime because, after all, they all knew more about that passion than they let on - Alice and Nicholas; Xavier (Pompeu José), compadre of Augustus; Aurora (Sofia Nicholson), factory employee, and especially André (Nuno Pardal), Gonçalo's sinister cousin.

Judiciary Police inspector Miguel Meireles (Pedro Teixeira) will play a leading role in this investigation in which he invests everything, also, to try to cheer up his wife, Laura Meireles (Fernanda Serrano) who, above all, unsuccessfully wants to be a mother, and is dedicated to writing a new crime-inspired fiction that hits Marina and Gonçalo. Laura's involvement in this inquiry will go far beyond what is advisable and thus endanger her life and put her marriage at risk.

== Cast ==
=== Main ===
- Maria João Pinho - Raquel Macedo
- Pedro Lima - Gonçalo Macedo
- Filipe Vargas - Augusto Oliveira
- Dina Félix da Costa - Marina Oliveira
- Fernanda Serrano - Laura Meireles
- Pedro Teixeira - Miguel Meireles

=== Secondary ===
- Helena Isabel - Matilde Macedo
- Catarina Rebelo - Alice Macedo
- Gonçalo Norton - Frederico Macedo
- Nuno Pardal - André Macedo
- Carolina Frias - Catarina Oliveira
- Bernardo Lobo Faria - Nicolau Oliveira
- Ana Varela - Sara Sousa
- Teresa Faria - Júlia Campos
- Diogo Lopes - João Paulo Nunes
- Sofia Nicholson - Aurora Justo
- Dinarte Branco - Vicente Barrigoto
- Isabel Figueira - Luísa Barrigoto
- Teresa Tavares - Aline Matias
- Luís Esparteiro - António Gouveia
- Pedro Almendra - Ângelo Severino
- Tomás Alves - Kevin Silva
- João Lagarto - Joaquim Zorra
- Rodrigo Trindade - Sebastião Gaio
- Pompeu José - José Emanuel Xavier
- João Didelet - Joaquim José «Quim Zé» Rodrigues
- Vicente Wallenstein - Manuel «Mané» António dos Santos
