= Amar Demais =

Portuguese telenovela

- "O que fazemos por amor?" (Portuguese) "What do we do for love?" (English)
- Genre: Melodrama
- Created by: Maria João Costa
- Developed by: Plural Entertainment
- Directed by: Sérgio Graciano
- Starring: Graciano Dias; Ana Varela; Fernanda Serrano; Sérgio Praia; Sofia Ribeiro (see more)
- Opening theme: "Santo Domingo" by João Pedro Pais
- Country of origin: Portugal
- Original language: Portuguese
- No. of episodes: 278

Production
- Running time: 55min

Original release
- Network: TVI
- Release: 14 September 2020 – 24 September 2021

Amar Demais (English: Unlimited Love) is a Portuguese telenovela broadcast and produced by TVI. It is written by Maria João Costa. The telenovela premiered on 14 September 2020 and ended on 24 September 2021. It is recorded between Lisbon and Faial Island.

== Plot ==
Zeca agrees to be arrested for a murder he has not committed in exchange for a large amount of money for her mother’s medical treatment. They don’t receive the money and his mother ends up dying. Zeca spends several years in jail and, when he gets out, he wants to prove his innocence, find the culprit and make up for all the lost time. Neither the family of the murdered man nor his own will make it easy for him.

== Phases ==
| Series | Episodes | Originally released | |
| Series | Episodes | First released | Last released |
|---|---|---|---|
| 1 | 278 | 14 September 2020 | 24 September 2021 |

== Cast ==
| Actor/Actress | Character |
|---|---|
| Graciano Dias | José «Zeca» Goulart |
| Ana Varela | Ema Avelar Benvindo |
| Fernanda Serrano | Vanda Rodrigues Gonçalves |
| Sérgio Praia | Raul Benvindo |
| Sofia Ribeiro | Célia Campos |
| Joaquim Nicolau | Pedro «Peter» Benvindo |
| Ana Guiomar | Rute Goulart |
| Ricardo Carriço | Gabriel Villanova |
| Dina Félix da Costa | Emília «Mi» Soares Goulart |
| Nuno Homem de Sá | Ulisses Queiroz |
| Maria Emília Correia | Maria Helena Benvindo |
| Nuno Pardal | André «Eça» Queiroz |
| Sofia Nicholson | Filomena Gonçalves |
| João Lagarto | Arnaldo Soares |
| Susana Arrais | Evelina Castelo Branco |
| Madalena Brandão | Salomé Correia |
| Helena Costa | Olga Soares Goulart |
| Beatriz Barosa | Rita Antunes Stevens |
| Matilde Reymão | Diana Benvindo Stanley |
| Catarina Rebelo | Joana Campos |
| Diogo Branco | Luís Gonçalves Rodrigues |
| Estrela Novais | Conceição «São» dos Anjos |
| Filipa Pinto | Constança Goulart |
| Filipe Matos | Frederico «Fred» Raposo |
| Joana Manuel | Carolina de Bragança Beckett |
| Isabel Figueira | Estela Campos |
| Jorge Albuquerque | David Benvindo |
| Miguel Bogalho | Sandro Soares |
| Ricardo Castro | Miguel Santos Costa |
| Salvador Nery | Fernando «Fana» Pinto |
| Carla Vasconcelos | Gisela Soares Goulart |
| Lia Gama | Antonieta de Bragança |
| Heitor Lourenço | Paulo Ferreira |
| Bárbara Magal | —N/a |
| Carlos Oliveira | Mateus |
| Mafalda Pinto | Liliana |
| Rute Miranda | Rosa |
