= Hoy voy a cambiar =

Mexican biographical TV miniseries

- Genre: Biographical
- Starring: Ari Telch; Victoria Viera; Giovana Fuentes; Sonia Couoh; Eugenio Montessoro; Anna Ciocchetti; Issabela Camil; Mariana Torres; Ferdinando Valencia; Gabriela Roel
- Narrated by: Lupita D'Alessio
- Country of origin: Mexico
- Original language: Spanish
- No. of seasons: 1
- No. of episodes: 21

Production
- Executive producers: Santiago Galindo; Rubén Galindo
- Camera setup: Multi-camera

Original release
- Network: Las Estrellas
- Release: 21 August – 17 September 2017

Hoy voy a cambiar is a Mexican biographical miniseries produced by Santiago and Rubén Galindo for Televisa. The series is based on the life of Mexican singer and actress Lupita D'Alessio. It stars Gabriela Roel and Mariana Torres as the titular character and is narrated by Lupita D'Alessio. The series tells the story of D'Alessio from before she started her career as a singer and actress until the moment she was forced to leave everything for drugs.

== Premise ==
Because the series is based on D'Alessio's life, many other public figures, television programs and singers were portrayed in the series, such as José José in the years when he became known, Raúl Velasco in the early stages of the program Siempre en Domingo and Adal Ramones. Another production included in the series is La Oreja, which showed the falling out between Ernesto D'Alessio and his father Jorge Vargas more than ten years ago.

== Cast ==
=== Main ===
- Ari Telch as César Gómez
- Victoria Viera as Child Lupita D'Alessio
- Giovana Fuentes as Teen Lupita D'Alessio
- Sonia Couoh
- Eugenio Montessoro as Ignacio "Nacho" D'Alessio
- Anna Ciocchetti as Fanny Schatz
- Issabela Camil as Esther Millán
- Mariana Torres as Young Lupita D'Alessio
- Ferdinando Valencia as Jorge Vargas
- Gabriela Roel as Adult Lupita D'Alessio

=== Recurring ===
- Christian Ramos as Héctor Fregoso
- Alejandro Tommasi as Ernesto Alonso
- Fabián Moura as Cristian Rossen
- Carlos Speitzer as Fernando Valero
- Isadora González as Nuri
- Axel Alcántara as Ernesto D'Alessio
- Joshua Gutiérrez as Jorge D'Alessio
- Paco Luna as César D'Alessio
- Raúl Olivo as Sabú
- Mauricio Castillo as Raúl Velasco
- Alex Trujillo as Julián
- Francisco Pizaña as Entrenador
- Ruth Rosas as Maestra
- Gerardo Santínez as Ludopatía

== Production ==
The script of the series is written by Rubén Galindo, who based the series on 14 hours of interviews with Lupita D'Alessio and her children. A total of 21 episodes have been confirmed so far.

== Ratings ==
=== Mexico rating ===
Season	Timeslot (CT)	Episodes	First aired		Last aired	
Season	Timeslot (CT)	Episodes	Date	Viewers (millions)	Date	Viewers (millions)
1	Mon–Fri 9:30 pm	21	21 August 2017	26.9	17 September 2017	23.3

=== U.S. rating ===
Season	Timeslot (ET)	Episodes	First aired		Last aired	
Season	Timeslot (ET)	Episodes	Date	Viewers (millions)	Date	Viewers (millions)
1	Mon–Fri 10 pm/9c	19	11 September 2017	1.12	10 October 2017	1.24

== Episodes ==
No.	Title	Original release date
1	"Yo no quería cantar"	21 August 2017
By her addictions, Lupita puts at risk her presentation in a concert. Her manager tries to revive her and, in her delirium, she remembers when her father forced her as a child to give up her dreams.
2	"El paso hacía adelante hay que darlo siempre"	22 August 2017
Between concerts and songs, Lupita transports us to her adolescence in Mexico City, where she is discovered and committed to a record label. She is later invited to Siempre en Domingo.
3	"Al público no hay que hacerlo esperar"	23 August 2017
Lupita's depressing present with the world of drugs contrasts with her successful presentation. She meets Jose Vargas and falls surrendered to his gallantry, despite the refusal of her parents escapes with him.
4	"Mi primer dolor"	24 August 2017
Lupita is on the brink of death, on the way to the hospital, she remembers her escape with José. Nacho finds out about her daughter's pregnancy, so she accepts the wedding. Happiness comes with the baby, but happiness lasts only 28 days.
5	"Tú y yo somos un equipo"	25 August 2017
While she is recovering, two great singers and friends speak of God to Lupita, but she does not think to stop the drugs. She receives an invitation to the CTI, which arouses the envy of José.
6	"Tu carrera o yo"	28 August 2017
Lupita is presented for the first time at the OTI Festival and she wins it. Professional jealousy blinds José, for he does not bear the success of his wife. After an argument with her husband, Lupita makes a decision that will change her life forever.
7	"El camino te eligió a ti"	29 August 2017
After the constant fights, Lupita decides to abandon José Vargas and his children. Jose, full of resentment, begins a media war against her.
8	"Te quiero fuera de mi vida"	30 August 2017
Lupita insists on seeing her children. During a night of celebration, she meets the soccer player Héctor Fregoso and they begin a relationship; While the problems with her ex-husband are getting stronger.
9	"Más vale un buen arreglo, que un mal plan"	31 August 2017
The relationship between Lupita and Hector begins to have problems. Lupita agrees to cede the parental authority of her children and give the divorce to Jose, but instead asks him to let her see them.
10	"Me asfixias"	1 September 2017
Lupita pauses in her race to dedicate herself to Héctor, but soon discovers that he is infidel to her and they finish their relation. Filled with rage, Lupita ravaged her house.
11	"Cómo pudiste hacerme esto"	4 September 2017
The breakup with Héctor Fregoso has Lupita very depressed. Later she meets Tulio, another soccer player, and despite not loving him, she decides to marry him to rebuild her life.
12	"Mírate nada más"	5 September 2017
Lupita begins to drink too much, at the same time that her success grows. During a trip to Panama she meets Sabdul, with whom she consumes drugs for the first time.
13	"¿Quieres terminar como yo?"	6 September 2017
Lupita puts her career in the hands of her husband Sabdul, who promises to make her an international star, without imagining the serious consequences of that decision.
14	"De mí te vas a acordar"	7 September 2017
Lupita is a victim of a millionaire fraud, and suspects that both her husband and his partners are responsible. After divorcing, Lupita begins an affair with one of her musicians.
15	"No quiero volver a saber de ti"	8 September 2017
Lupita is very distressed by her mother's health, and slowly sinks more into drugs. The bad relationship between the new husband and the children of Lupita intensifies, so she decides to send them to Canada.
16	"Esa sombra que no te deja ser tu misma"	11 September 2017
The children of Lupita return from Canada, and find her in very bad condition because of Sergio and her drug addiction. Pressured by their father, Jorge and Ernesto declare to the media that Lupita is a drug addict.
17	"Nadie tiene la vida comprada"	12 September 2017
Lupita discovers that her children consume drugs, and she worries. Jorge organizes a party where he presents his dealer and friends, without imagining that later, Lupita will lose control of her addiction.
18	"Te lo advertí"	13 September 2017
Depressed by the death of her father, Lupita takes refuge in drugs. Valero not knowing how to help, decides to leave. Danny stops managing Lupita's career, prompting demands for concert cancellations.
19	"La vida es corta y todo lo soporta"	14 September 2017
In her eagerness to feel young, Lupita marries Cristian Rommel: a man who is with her in exchange for money and comforts. She, blinded by the supposed love, allows blows and humiliations.
20	"Caída libre"	15 September 2017
Completely intoxicated, Lupita and her friend decide to take a trip in which they suffer a big accident. During one of her crises, Lupita has a moment of lucidity, and makes a decision that will change her life completely.
21	"Yo sigo aquí"	17 September 2017
Lupita is admitted to a rehabilitation center; during the process she realizes all the damage done to her children and to herself. Returning to Mexico, she is rejected and judged by her children, but tries to claim her forgiveness.

=== Special ===
Title	Original release date
"El legado"	28 October 2017
Lupita D'Alessio confesses why she accepted to make her bioserie.

== Awards and nominations ==
Year	Award	Category	Nominated	Result
2018	TVyNovelas Awards	Best Series	Santiago Galindo and Rubén Galindo	Won
2018	TVyNovelas Awards	Best Actress in Series	Gabriela Roel	Nominated
2018	TVyNovelas Awards	Best Actress in Series	Mariana Torres	Won
2018	TVyNovelas Awards	Best Actor in Series	Ari Telch	Nominated
2018	TVyNovelas Awards	Best Actor in Series	Eugenio Montessoro	Nominated
2018	TVyNovelas Awards	Best Actor in Series	Ferdinando Valencia	Won
