= Control Z =

Mexican television series

- Season 1 promotional poster
- Genre: Teen drama
- Created by: Carlos Quintanilla Sakar; Adriana Pelusi; Miguel García Moreno
- Directed by: Alejandro Lozano; Bernardo de la Rosa
- Starring: Ana Valeria Becerril; Michael Ronda; Yankel Stevan; Zión Moreno; Luis Curiel; Samantha Acuña; Macarena García; Fiona Palomo; Andrés Baida; Patricio Gallardo; Iván Aragón; Xabiani Ponce de León; Paty Maqueo; Rodrigo Cachero; Rocío Verdejo; Mauro Sánchez Navarro; Lidia San José; Thanya López; Renata del Castillo; Arturo Barba; Kariam Castro; Ariana Saavedra; Ana Sofía Gatica; Cristian Santin; Sandra Burgos; Pierre Louis
- Opening theme: "San Diego" by Hinds
- Ending theme: "Hold Your Horses On" by Lasser Drakar featuring Stag Girls
- Composer: Andrés Sanchez Maher
- Country of origin: Mexico
- Original language: Spanish
- No. of seasons: 3
- No. of episodes: 24

Production
- Executive producers: Billy Rovzar; Fernando Rovzar; Alejandro Lozano; Erica Sánchez Su
- Running time: 35–44 minutes
- Production company: Lemon Studios

Original release
- Network: Netflix
- Release: 22 May 2020 – 6 July 2022

Control Z is a Mexican teen drama television series created by Carlos Quintanilla Sakar, Adriana Pelusi and Miguel García Moreno and developed by Lemon Studios for Netflix, that premiered on Netflix on 22 May 2020. The show stars Ana Valeria Becerril, Michael Ronda, Yankel Stevan and Zión Moreno. Shortly after its release, the series was renewed for a second season on 29 May 2020. Season 2 was released on 4 August 2021 and later that month, the series was renewed for a third and final season, which was released on 6 July 2022.

== Premise ==
During an assembly at Colegio Nacional (National School), an unknown hacker exposes a student as transgender, humiliating her. The next day, the hacker reveals more students' secrets. That causes numerous teens to turn on each others. Sofía Herrera, an introverted teenager, tries to uncover who this hacker is before more secrets (including hers) become public. She is joined in her mission by Javier Williams, a newly transferred student.

== Cast and characters ==
Actor	Character	Season		
Actor	Character	1	2	3
Ana Valeria Becerril	Sofía Herrera	Main	Main	Main
Michael Ronda	Javier Williams	Main	Main	Main
Yankel Stevan	Raúl León	Main	Main	Main
Zión Moreno	Isabela de la Fuente	Main	Archive footage (Note: Archive footage of season 1 from the character is shown in 2x08 and 3x03, but is not credited.)	Archive footage
Luis Curiel	Luis Navarro	Main (Note: Luis Curiel is still credited as a series regular despite making only a handful of appearances in the second and third seasons.)	Main	Main
Samantha Acuña	Alejandra "Alex" Salomone	Main	Main	Main
Macarena García Romero	Natalia Alexander	Main	Main	Main
Fiona Palomo	María Alexander	Main (Note: Fiona Palomo is still credited as a series regular despite making only a handful of appearances in the third season.)	Main	Main
Andrés Baida	Pablo García	Main	Main	Main
Patricio Gallardo	Gerardo "Gerry" Granda	Main	Main	Main
Iván Aragón	Darío	Main	Main	Main
Xabiani Ponce de León	Ernesto	Main	Main	Main
Patricia Maqueo	Rosa "Rosita" Restrepo	Main	Main	Main
Rodrigo Cachero	Miguel Quintanilla	Main	Main	Main
Rocío Verdejo	Nora	Main	Main	Main
Mauro Sánchez Navarro	Bruno	Main		Recurring
Lidia San José	Gabriela	Main (Note: Lidia San José is still credited as a series regular despite making only a handful of appearances in the third season.)	Main	Main
Thanya López	Susana	Main (Note: Thanya López is still credited as a series regular despite making only a handful of appearances in the third season.)	Main	Main
Renata del Castillo	Lulú	Main	Main	Main
Arturo Barba	Rogelio Herrera/Fernando	Main (Note: In the third season, Arturo Barba is credited in the episodes in which he appears.)	Main	Main
Kariam Castro	Valeria	Main	Main	Main
Ariana Saavedra	Regina	Main	Main	Main
Ana Sofía Gatica	Claudia		Main	Main
Cristian Santin	Antonio Segovia "El Güero"	Recurring	Main	Main
Sandra Burgos	Marta	Recurring	Main	Main
Pierre Louis	Felipe "Pipe"		Main (Note: Pierre Louis is credited as a series regular in the episodes which he appears in.)	Guest

=== Main ===
- Ana Valeria Becerril as Sofía Herrera, her love interests was Raúl and now Javier. She is a very observant and quiet student, often seen as an outsider by her peers and when secrets are revealed, she sets out to investigate who the hacker is. She is smart and very justice-driven, but normally has to keep the peace between Raúl and Javier and she suffers from mental health problems due to her family situation.
- Michael Ronda as Javier Williams, the new student and a love interest of Sofía. He quickly makes friends with Sofía on his first day at National School. He expresses romantic feelings for Sofía throughout the season and has a rivalry with Raúl, usually over the investigation and Sofía. He is the son of a retired footballer, Damian Williams, but refuses the coach's requests for him to play for the school team due to trauma from accidentally murdering a teammate from his former high school.
- Yankel Stevan as Raúl León, a love interest of Sofía. Just like Javier he expresses romantic feelings for Sofía throughout the season. He comes from quite a wealthy family and is initially one of the popular kids but later helps Sofía track down the hacker. He strongly dislikes Javier.
- Zión Moreno as Isabela de la Fuente (season 1), a transgender student and former girlfriend of Pablo. She was the most popular girl in the school and was liked by many boys, but after it was revealed that she was trans, she got harassed by multiple students and dumped by Pablo. In season 2, as mentioned by María, she left the school sometime after the hacker was unmasked.
- Luis Curiel as Luis Navarro, a quiet student who enjoys drawing. He is often misunderstood and bullied by Gerry, Ernesto and Dario, but is helped by Sofía and Javier, and has a friendship with Alex.
- Samantha Acuña as Alejandra "Alex" Salomone, an openly yet socially distant lesbian student who is in a forbidden relationship with her Biology teacher Gabriela and is talented with computers.
- Macarena García Romero as Natalia Alexander, one of the popular students, twin sister of María and one of Isabela's former best friends. She was in charge of organizing the NONA event until the secret about her using money raised from it in order to buy expensive items for herself was exposed. She is very self-centred, focused, and goes to extreme lengths to achieve what she wants.
- Fiona Palomo as María Alexander, the twin sister of Natalia and another of Isabela's former best friends who is secretly having a fling with Pablo behind her back. She is often her sister's sidekick, but is nicer to people and always tries to make her friends happy. She feels guilty about being with Pablo while he was dating Isabela.
- Andrés Baida as Pablo García, one of the popular students and ex-boyfriend of Isabela. He dumped Isabela in front of the school after she was exposed for being trans, but tries to reconcile with her multiple times later, despite cheating with María. He is loyal to his friends and encourages Gerry to stop bullying Luis, but is revealed to be an unfaithful boyfriend. In season 2, he is the most unforgiving of the student body when Raúl returns to the school despite his actions as the hacker that he incessantly uses violence as a mean to make him pay for everything he did, even after finding out that he's been hiding Gerry, who is wanted by the police for murdering Luis. He also tries unsuccessfully to reconcile with María for acting indifferently over her pregnancy.
- Patricio Gallardo as Gerardo "Gerry" Granda, a former student at National School and ex-boyfriend of Rosita. He is a closeted sexually curious but ideally heterosexual boy who is exposed for watching gay pornography. He constantly bullied Luis along with his minions, Darío and Ernesto, and crosses the line when he sends Luis into a coma. He is very aggressive and bottles up a lot of anger and insecurity inside, but is shown to be empathetic and regrets his mistreatment of Luis.
- Iván Aragón as Darío, one of Gerry's minions
- Xabiani Ponce de León as Ernesto, another of Gerry's minions
- Paty Maqueo as Rosa "Rosita" Restrepo, Gerry's ex-girlfriend who breaks up with him after his secret is exposed. She takes over as the organizer of the NONA after Natalia is revealed to be stealing the money.
- Rodrigo Cachero as Miguel Quintanilla, the former principal of National School. He is dating Sofía's mother and proposes, but is rejected. He has sex with Susana in spitefulness. In season 2, he is engaged to Nora until she breaks it off after his affair with Susana comes to light.
- Rocío Verdejo as Nora, Sofía's mother, who is distrustful of her daughter's decisions and the people she hangs out with after her father's supposed death.
- Mauro Sánchez Navarro as Bruno (season 1; recurring season 3), the person in charge of technology at the school who assists the hacker in revealing the secrets of the students. He returns to get revenge on Raúl and the others for making his stay in jail a very horrific one by threatening to expose their involvement in Susana's death.
- Lidia San José as Gabriela, a Biology teacher who is fired from National School after her relationship with Alex is exposed. She later moves to Spain for a job opportunity.
- Thanya López as Susana, one of the teachers at National School. She later becomes the new principal in season 2 and is accidentally murdered during a scuffle over Raúl's money bag.
- Renata del Castillo as Lulú, Quintanilla's secretary at National School.
- Arturo Barba as Fernando/Rogelio Herrera, Sofía's father and Nora's husband who fakes his own death. In season 2, he ends up in jail when the hacker exposes the truth. It is later revealed in season 3 that the reason why he did so is because he has another family.
- Kariam Castro as Valeria, a mean student who makes fun of Isabela after her secret is exposed.
- Ariana Saavedra as Regina, Valeria's friend.
- Ana Sofía Gatica as Claudia (seasons 2–3), María's friend and love interest. She had issues with Pablo due to his previous behaviour, before the two put their differences aside to help rescue Natalia when she is kidnapped. They later become friends. She teams up with Sofia and the others to cover up Susana's murder and investigate the new hacker who wants to expose them in season 3.
- Cristian Santin as Antonio Segovia "El Güero" (seasons 2–3; recurring season 1), the former P.E. teacher and Susana's husband. He resigned after Susana's death, and became a depressed alcoholic.
- Sandra Burgos as Marta, Luis's mother (seasons 2–3; recurring season 1)
- Pierre Louis as Felipe "Pipe" (season 2; guest season 3), a handsome man Gerry falls in love with while he hides from the police.

=== Recurring ===
- Alexander Holtmann as Lalo de la Fuente (season 1), Isabela's father
- Nastassia Villasana as Bety de la Fuente (season 1), Isabela's mother
- Marco Zunino as Damián Williams, Javier's father and a retired footballer
- Susana Lozano as Gerry's mother (seasons 1–2)
- Ricardo Crespo as Gerry's father (seasons 1–2)
- Daniela Zavala as Alondra de León (season 1), Raúl's mother
- Alejandro Ávila as Roberto de León (season 1), Raúl's father
- Rodrigo Mejía as Natalia's father (seasons 1–2)
- Citlali Galindo as Natalia's mother
- Fabián Mejía as Salvador (season 1)
- Cuitlahuac Santoyo as Gibrán
- Pablo de la Rosa as Jordi (season 1; guest season 2)
- David Montalvo as Joaquín (season 1) and Bernardo (season 3)
- Diana Carreiro as Daniela (season 3), a new student at the Colegio Nacional who wants to belong to the “masked sect” and will bring out her most evil side
- Carmen Beato as Elvia (season 3), the new principal at National School following Susana's death
- Gina Varela as Ana (season 3), Pablo's mother

== Episodes ==
Series	Episodes	Originally released
1	8	22 May 2020
2	8	4 August 2021
3	8	6 July 2022

=== Season 1 (2020) ===
No. overall	No. in season	Title	Directed by	Written by	Original release date
1	1	"Birthday Girl" (Spanish: "La chica del cumpleaños")	Alejandro Lozano	Adriana Pelusi	22 May 2020
Sofía, a highly observant student, makes friends with the new kid, Javier Williams. Luis, a defenseless person, gets bullied by Gerry. During a school assembly, a mysterious hacker reveals that popular student Isabela is transgender by blackmailing Raúl, Natalia and Gerry, threatening to leak their secrets. As a result, Isabela's boyfriend, Pablo, who knew about this beforehand, dumps her out of shame, although Natalia and María, her two best friends, support her. Sofía and Javier investigate to find the hacker while the hacker texts Isabela to take revenge on those who disclosed her and also Pablo, to which she replies "yes." Secret Subject: Isabela de la Fuente, who is a trans woman, supported by a childhood video of her birthday in which she wished to be a girl.
2	2	"Victims" (Spanish: "Víctimas")	Alejandro Lozano	Carlos Quintanilla Sakar	22 May 2020
The hacker leaks the secrets of Raúl, Natalia, Pablo, and Gerry by Isabela's request. Raúl's private videos reveal his father, a politician, is corrupt. Natalia is revealed to be stealing the money she collected for the NONA party. Gerry's search history is leaked which shows that he watches gay porn. Finally, Pablo is revealed to have sent his intimate photos and videos to his "Honey Bunny," indicating he had been cheating on Isabela already, making him regret his decision of breaking up with her. Nonetheless, Gerry still humiliates Isabela for her gender identity which evokes a mutual fight between Raúl, Javier, and Gerry. They are all called to Principal Quintanilla's office while Sofía shows up, after deliberately misbehaving, to get clues about the hacker. Isabela confronts Natalia for selling her out to the hacker by stealing her cellphone that contained the video. On the other hand, Natalia is removed as the organizer of the NONA over the money theft, and her nemesis Rosita takes over. Rosita also breaks up with Gerry despite repeatedly denying that he is gay. While Sofía is in Quintanilla's office, she discovers that he plans to propose to Sofía's mother, Nora, who he is currently seeing romantically. Sofía also gets dragged in the game when the hacker starts sending photos of her and her supposedly deceased father, Fernando. Natalia, Raúl, and Gerry face the consequences of their blunders at their homes. When his mother won't stop complaining about the bullying he is receiving, Luis admits that he is the real hacker and, as a result, is expelled from the school. Secret Subject: Gerry Granda, who happens to have been watching gay porn. Natalia Alexander, who has been stealing the money she collected for NONA to buy expensive items for herself. Raúl León, whose politician father is revealed to be corrupt. Pablo García, whose nude pics reveal he has been cheating on Isabela with another girl, whom he calls his "Honey Bunny".
3	3	"Idiots" (Spanish: "Idiotas")	Alejandro Lozano	Miguel García Moreno	22 May 2020
Enraged by Luis's revelation, Gerry decides to take revenge on him along with Pablo. Javier overhears their plan and follows them. Sofía approaches Luis to tell him that she knows that he lied about him being the hacker. He admits that he lied so he could get out of being bullied by Gerry. Gerry and his minions run after Luis to beat him up but Javier intervenes by slamming his car onto a wall, forcing them to flee the scene when a cop starts approaching. Natalia is asked by Principal Quintanilla to return all the money she stole, but she already spent it all. She tries to collect money by selling her expensive goods. The hacker puts on a live event for Gerry to beat up Luis. Principal Quintanilla hears of this beforehand and locks Gerry in the auditorium. The students gather outside the school for the fight while Luis arrives too. Alex, a socially distant girl, unlocks Gerry, and he runs to the location of the fight. This leads to a massive affray. Sofía and Javier try to save Luis by evading the scene but Gerry drags Luis out of Javier's car and punches him hard, knocking him over. Luis hits the pavement and goes into a coma. Luis' mother blames Quintanilla for the whole ordeal. Fernando leaves the book club to avoid Sofía so that he might not go to prison after he is made aware about the hacker. Secret Subject: Sofía Herrera, who lied to everyone about her father's death.
4	4	"Night School" (Spanish: "Clase nocturna")	Bernardo de la Rosa	Adriana Pelusi	22 May 2020
Raúl discovers that his parents have fled the country to avoid prosecution and left him a large sum of money. He buys an expensive motorcycle and plans to throw a party at his house and invites the whole school. Gerry gets expelled from school because of his aggressive attack on Luis, whose mother, on the other hand, does not press any charges against him. Sofía receives a text from the hacker to go to Raúl's party. Sofía obeys and attends the party with Javier while her mother goes on a date with Quintanilla. At the party, the hacker plays tricks on Sofía while Natalia discovers someone who lends money illegally. Quintanilla proposes to Nora to which she declines, fearing for her daughter's reaction. Sofía then notices the hacker's logo on walls and glasses which take her to the roof where she encounters Alex. Alex asks Sofía to jump into the pool from the roof as the hacker says or he will reveal her secret girlfriend. After much disapproval of Javier, Sofía jumps into the pool anyway and is pulled out by Raúl. Javier, upset, leaves. María, Natalia's innocent-looking sister, is revealed to be Pablo's "Honey Bunny." María asks Pablo to stop seeing her as for the sake of her friendship with Isabela, who is suffering from the aftermath of being outed as trans, but then has sex with him. Raúl, having a crush on Sofía, kisses her. Gerry arrives at the party but is immediately forced out for what he did to Luis. Alex's girlfriend is revealed to be their Biology teacher, Gabriela. Raúl and Sofía go in the basement to dry Sofía's clothes where they experience a shutdown. As Raúl goes to check the fuse, Sofía is kidnapped by the hacker. Secret Subject: Alex, whose secret girlfriend is revealed to be Gabriela, her Biology teacher. María Alexander, who is revealed as the Honey Bunny having an affair with Pablo.
5	5	"Face to Face" (Spanish: "Cara a cara")	Bernardo de la Rosa	Carlos Quintanilla Sakar, Adriana Pelusi & Miguel García Moreno	22 May 2020
After holding Sofía hostage, the hacker takes her bracelet, subdues her again and drops her unconscious at her house. While in the truck, half-awake Sofía gathers clues. Sofía reassembles the gathered clues and finds the truck with the help of Javier and Raúl, who keep fighting over her. The truck turns out to belong to Bruno, the school's IT guy. In Bruno's apartment, Sofía finds something of Javier's but does not tell him. After an attempted interrogation, Bruno escapes them and Javier is framed. Sofía starts suspecting that Javier might be the hacker, especially after he claimed that he didn't have a secret when she asked him earlier. At the school, Principal Quintanilla has sex with Susana, a married teacher, and are seen by Raúl. The hacker announces to the student body that all of their secrets will be revealed by midnight during the NONA party. After a fallout over her behaviour during Raúl's party, María distances herself from Natalia, who starts selling drugs at the school campus. Isabela and María also start spending time together again, but María can't find the courage to tell her that she is the Honey Bunny. Gabriela breaks up with Alex, fearing that the hacker might reveal their relationship. Secret Subject: Principal Quintanilla, who has an affair with Susana, a married teacher, out of spitefulness for being rejected by Nora. Bruno, who is in league with the hacker.
6	6	"How Well Do You Really Know Javier?" (Spanish: "¿Qué tanto conoces a Javier?")	Bernardo de la Rosa	Carlos Quintanilla Sakar, Adriana Pelusi & Miguel García Moreno	22 May 2020
Sofía and Raúl report to Quintanilla that Bruno is affiliated with the hacker. He may have also escaped with all his belongings. Sofía discovers that Javier had previously accidentally killed his former football teammate, Guillermo Garaby, during a rite of passage. In addition, Javier's father, a former football player himself and wealthy businessman, used his connections to keep his son's involvement a secret and bribed the others into silence. Isabela suspects Natalia to be the Honey Bunny, which she denies, after the hacker gives her a hint. María shows symptoms of pregnancy when she vomits some brownies that Isabela gave to her. To pay Rosita the funds she had collected for the NONA, Natalia starts working for Jordi, a drug dealer who gives her a loan. Quintanilla cancels the NONA party and bans all cellphones as security measures, which frustrates the students and especially Rosita. Isabela befriends Alex, who previously defended her from some female bullies who made fun of her gender identity. Sofía and Raúl find a newspaper article of Guillermo's death and Sofía's bracelet in Javier's locker that confirm their suspicions about him. Disappointed, Sofía tells Javier that she doesn't recognize him anymore. Gerry keeps visiting Luis out of guilt. At home, Sofía argues with her mother, who confronts her for skipping school with Raúl, and tells her to think about herself and not Sofía. Sofía has memories of her father's death. Stressed, she runs to Raúl and has sex with him, with a mask seen under his bed. Secret Subject: Javier Williams, who is responsible for unintentional death of Guillermo Garaby, one of the football teammates of his former high school, which is why he transferred mid-year to National School, since his father is an influential man.
7	7	"Control Z" (Spanish: "Control Z")	Bernardo de la Rosa	Carlos Quintanilla Sakar, Adriana Pelusi & Miguel García Moreno	22 May 2020
In a flashback sequence of the prior semester, Raúl invites Natalia, Gerry, Maria, Pablo and others to his house where he shows off his father's antique collection and money. They start to record videos there but are interrupted by Raúl's father, who orders them out of the house. Raúl gets blackmailed by someone unknown, later revealed to be Bruno, for ten thousand pesos or he will leak the videos showing his father's corruption. Raúl realizes that his friends are only with him because of his money. They also gossip about Sofía's illness and wonder just what this means for them. Sofía desires a world without secrets and Raúl forms a plan to give her just that. With the help of Bruno, Raúl discovers that Fernando, Sofía's father, is alive and using an alias. Raúl is revealed to be the one who leaked all the private information about everyone. He was also the one who blackmailed Alex to unlock Gerry and forced Sofía to jump off the roof at the party. Furthermore, he was the one who sent Luis the lines to speak while confronting everybody at the huge fight and driving Sofía's father away from their usual meeting spot. Jealous of Javier, Raúl also framed him to be the hacker so Sofía would turn on him. Secret Subject: Raúl León, who is revealed as the real hacker.
8	8	"Public Enemy" (Spanish: "Enemigo público")	Alejandro Lozano & Bernardo de la Rosa	Carlos Quintanilla Sakar, Adriana Pelusi & Miguel García Moreno	22 May 2020
Sofía and Raúl report Javier to Quintanilla by showing him the video of Guillermo's murder. After initially reluctant to do so, he expels Javier after Raúl blackmails him by threatening to leak his sex video to Nora. Rosita succeeds in organizing the NONA. Raúl helps in his father's arrest. At NONA, Natalia sells drugs to make up for her loan and Maria tells Pablo about her pregnancy, but he reacts indifferently and ditches her. At the hospital, Luis dies in his coma, which infuriates Gerry. Pablo tries to forcibly kiss Isabela, who still refuses his advances, but when María comes to her defense, he spitefully reveals to Isabela that Maria was his "Honey Bunny". Angered and betrayed, Isabela ends her friendship with María. Sofía tricks Raúl into confessing that he is the hacker, with Javier recording the confession and playing it at the NONA. Raúl tries to make it out of the NONA, but Pablo punches him. Raúl then reveals the secrets of everyone at NONA, including Sofía, Javier, Alex and Maria. The revelations cause a massive affray between the students during which Natalia's collected money is lost. Gerry, upon realizing Raúl is the hacker, shows up to NONA and confronts him with a gun, demanding an explanation over his actions. Raúl reveals that Luis had a crush on Gerry, which distresses him, and further fills him with guilt. Gerry attempts to shoot him, but Javier gets shot instead trying to intervene. The show ends with an aerial shot of Javier bleeding out, while Sofía desperately tries to help him, and a crowd forms around them. Secret Subject: After being exposed as the hacker, Raúl leaks everyone else's secrets, including Sofía, Javier, Alex and María. He then reveals to Gerry that Luis had a crush on him.

=== Season 2 (2021) ===
No. overall	No. in season	Title	Directed by	Written by	Original release date
9	1	"You Can't Bury the Past" (Spanish: "No se puede enterrar el pasado")	Alejandro Lozano & Bernardo de la Rosa	Carlos Quintanilla Sakar & Miguel García Moreno	4 August 2021
In the aftermath of the previous events, Javier survives the gunshot (which further boosts his popularity among girls), Raúl is still vilified by his classmates over his role as the hacker, Nora and Quintanilla are engaged, María finds support in Claudia after Isabela and Pablo abandon her, Gerry is wanted by the police for murdering Luis and Gabriela is fired from National School after her romance with Alex is exposed. Two months later, the entire school mourns Luis and hosts a ceremony to honor him. However, another hacker launches a threatening message to everyone, demanding that they hand over Gerry, warning that "You can't bury the past", and starting to target each of the students, first with Gerry's former friends, Darío and Ernesto, who are buried alive in a cemetery but are subsequently saved by Sofía and Javier. A hooded figure, later revealed to be Raúl, attacks Javier and flees on his motorcycle. Nora is upset at Sofía for hiding the fact that her father is still alive as the whole scandal caused them to get evicted. Natalia is given an ultimatum by the drug dealers. Target of the Avenger: Darío and Ernesto, who are drugged and buried alive at a cemetery.
10	2	"The Return" (Spanish: "El Regreso")	Alejandro Lozano & Bernardo de la Rosa	Florencia Castillo	4 August 2021
Lulú, Quintanilla's secretary, finds the walls spray-painted and a half-naked Alex gagged and tied inside a classroom and releases her, before also showing the lockers spray-painted with the word "REVENGE" on them, which leaves very clear the Avenger's mission: to avenge Luis. Alex has no recollection of the events that happened to her and Sofía deduces that she was drugged. Alex also tells Sofía that she was the one who released Gerry the day of the fight that cost Luis his life. Raúl's return to the school leaves everyone infuriated, prompting two fights between him, a vengeful Pablo and the student body that are broken up by both the gym teacher and Sofía, who sets off the alarms of the parked cars to get Quintanilla's attention. Unable to expel Raúl as he still uses his affair with Susana against him, Quintanilla states that he will no longer protect him. María refuses to talk to Pablo for having neglected her before; thereupon Pablo, jealous of Claudia, warns her to stay away from María. Natalia finds out that Raúl is hiding Gerry at his house, but doesn't tell Sofía when she arrives to confront him. However, Raúl blackmails Natalia into staying quiet by threatening to reveal her involvement with the drug dealers. Jordi, one of the dealers who is in league with Natalia, leaves the city to avoid being killed over the money. Nora secretly tips off the police on Rogelio's whereabouts and he is arrested. Meanwhile, Javier and Sofía investigate Luis's house and find his drawings, but are forced to leave abruptly when Marta coincidentally arrives. Just then, the house is set on fire with a molotov cocktail as another warning from the Avenger, forcing both Sofía and Javier to narrowly escape unnoticed. Target of the Avenger: Alex, who is drugged and left half-naked, bound and gagged inside a classroom. Marta, Luis's mother, whose house is set on fire.
11	3	"Needs" (Spanish: "Necesidades")	Bernardo de la Rosa & Alejandro Lozano	Miguel García Moreno	4 August 2021
Rosita wants to throw a birthday party at her house, despite Sofía and Javier trying to convince her to call it off, fearing a possible attack from the Avenger, to no avail. Quintanilla is removed as principal of National School by decision of the school council, given how poorly he has been handling the situation with the Avenger, with Susana taking over as his permanent replacement. Nevertheless, Susana is also unable to expel Raúl for the same reasons as Quintanilla. Fed up with being locked up at will, Gerry breaks his self-imposed curfew by leaving Raúl's house and going to a gay bar where he meets a man named Pipe. During the party, Javier and Natalia take a romantic interest for each other, much to Sofía's jealousy, while Pablo's controlling attitude towards María meets no boundaries. Realizing that the Avenger has poisoned a vodka bottle, Sofía tries to save everyone by throwing off their drinks, just as another fight breaks out between Raúl and the still outraged Pablo which ends with María, who has drunk from said bottle, collapsing and overdosing uncontrollably, leaving her hospitalized. Target of the Avenger: María, who is nearly poisoned to death and overdoses after drinking from a spiked bottle.
12	4	"Nothing to Hide" (Spanish: "Nada que esconder")	Alejandro Lozano & Bernardo de la Rosa	Carlos Quintanilla Sakar	4 August 2021
Pablo feels immersed with guilt after finding out that María has aborted her baby. Alex is upset when Gabriela, now unemployed, has to leave for Spain after accepting a job offer there. Natalia arrives at the school after being attacked and kidnapped by the Avenger. Javier and Sofía clash with each other as Sofía finds her story unconvincing and believes that she knew their identity after noticing her ripped dress, a broken heel and a bruise on her arm (interpreted as signs that she tried to fight back), so Javier accuses her of being jealous of their new relationship. Nevertheless, Sofía believes that Natalia is only using Javier to solve her money issues. Nora and Rogelio don't tell Sofía that she had ordered his arrest. Sparks fly between Gerry and Pipe as they continue bonding. Pablo, suspended from the school for beating up Raúl again, confronts María over her abortion and suspects that Claudia convinced her to do so; on the other hand, Natalia genuinely shows support and promises to always be there for María. Javier offers his help to Natalia regarding her money situation. Gerry suddenly goes missing and Raúl, panicking over what the Avenger might do next, admits to Sofía that Gerry has been living at his house and enlists her help in looking for him. Target of the Avenger: Natalia, who was assaulted, attacked and put into a van before being thrown out after arriving at school.
13	5	"New Pleasures" (Spanish: "Nuevos placeres")	Bernardo de la Rosa & Alejandro Lozano	Florencia Castillo & Carlos Quintanilla Sakar	4 August 2021
Sofía and Raúl track Gerry's GPS location to a massive queer club, unaware that they are being followed by Pablo, who snaps a picture of them and sends it to Javier. Meanwhile, Natalia, in order to get the money, uses a sugar daddy app under an alias and María teams up with her. She is matched with an older guy, and they agree to meet in a restaurant, but he turns out to be none other than Javier's father Damián, making Natalia rush out of the place in embarrassment when he indirectly brings Javier up. Sofía and Raúl eventually find Gerry, but before they can deal with him, Pablo, seeing the three together, furiously charges at Raúl, calling him out for harbouring a killer but also mistakenly believing that Sofía was his accomplice, before being forcefully removed by the bouncers after he aggressively shoves her to the ground trying to stop him. Gerry uses the altercation to escape and is sent away by Raúl. At Nora's request, Javier searches and finds Sofía outside the club, though she refuses to return home, and he leaves to see Natalia instead, still thinking that she trusts Raúl after everything he did. Heading back to his place, Raúl and Sofía, following an argument over his previous actions, sleep together, as do Javier and Natalia, Gerry and Pipe, Alex and Gabriela, as well as Rosita, Darío and Ernesto, engaging in a pre-agreed threesome. Raúl promises not to lie to Sofía anymore, but still hides from her the affair between Quintanilla and Susana so he can remain at the school. As Sofía is taking a shower, Raúl is tased by the Avenger who forces him to unlock his safe, thus stealing all of his money. Sofía quickly runs to check on him. Target of the Avenger: Raúl, who is tasered and his large amounts of money are stolen.
14	6	"A Minute of Silence" (Spanish: "Un minuto de silencio")	Alejandro Lozano & Bernardo de la Rosa	Carlos Quintanilla Sakar & Florencia Castillo	4 August 2021
Pablo spreads out the news about Raúl and, allegedly, Sofía hiding Gerry, causing the whole student body to turn on her, including the disappointed Alex. Susana calls them both to her office for questioning where they try to explain that Pablo had set them up, to no avail. Susana considers expelling them, but once again gives in to Raúl's blackmailing skills, leaving Sofía suspicious and confused as to why she relented. Remembering it is Quintanilla's farewell party, Sofía deduces that he is the Avenger's next victim. María tries to explain to Javier's father the truth about the money Natalia owes, but is rejected as a result. Pipe finds out about Gerry's true identity and angrily kicks him out of his house. Quintanilla is locked up in a restroom by the Avenger and is stung by bees until he is released. In humiliation, he lashes out at the students for refusing to acknowledge the hard work he has done to keep the school afloat, claiming that they deserve the misfortunes caused by the Avenger due to their self-righteous attitudes. María and Claudia share a moment and kiss at Claudia's home, but María abruptly leaves in shame. Sofía confronts her mother after figuring out that she is the reason why her father was locked up, having found some papers related to an arrest warrant on him. Continuing to work together, Sofía and Raúl get ahold of and look over Luis's drawings, which echo the comeuppances of the Avenger's past victims. They realize that the Avenger is fulfilling Luis's wishes, through his violent fantasies, on those students who made him feel miserable and wonder who might be the next victim. Target of the Avenger: Quintanilla, who is locked up in the men's restroom and stung by bees.
15	7	"Control Z"	Alejandro Lozano & Bernardo de la Rosa	Miguel García Moreno & Carlos Quintanilla Sakar	4 August 2021
In a flashback, the lonely Luis is shown drawing each of the students and their predicted punishments. Sofía shows the drawings to her father, noticing that most of the humiliating punishments are similar to the drawings except for Gerry and Raúl. She later finds out about Quintanilla's affair with Susana, thus severing ties with Raúl for keeping the information from her and demanding that Quintanilla tell Nora or she will. However, the gym teacher, also Susana's husband, arrives at Quintanilla's house when he's with Nora, and punches him before he can tell her, implying that he had somehow already found out. Meanwhile, Damián agrees to give the money to Natalia only if she brings María, who starts avoiding Claudia after the kiss. Alex is revealed to be the reason why Gerry became hostile towards Luis, since she encouraged him to show a drawing he made of Gerry. In effect to that, Gerry used this new personality to mask his true feelings and avoid being made fun of at school after his homophobic abusive father accused him of being gay for accepting the drawing. Susana has students's bags and lockers searched up to see if there's any flammable material that can be used in attacking Rosita (as she could be the next possible victim, as revealed by Luis's drawings), but no proof is found. Gerry visits Marta and they have a heart-to-heart conversation, with the latter lamenting that the other students are suffering because of the Avenger, knowing that Luis would've never wanted any of these incidents to happen; he decides to turn himself in to the police as a way to make up for his previous behavior. Rosita ignores Sofía's warnings about the Avenger wanting to target her. Gabriela leaves for Spain without Alex and breaks up with her, leaving Alex heartbroken. Pablo still wants to get revenge on Raúl, forcing a confession out of him until Gerry shows up to defend him by knocking Pablo unconscious. At the same time, Javier is horrified upon witnessing Natalia and his father making out, and Sofía faints after the Avenger switched one of her pills, prompting Rosita to rush to her aid. Target of the Avenger: Sofía, who "faints" after one of her pills was switched. Rosita was intended as the next victim but it never came to happen.
16	8	"The Ultimate Revenge" (Spanish: "La última venganza")	Bernardo de la Rosa & Alejandro Lozano	Miguel García Moreno	4 August 2021
Natalia catches up to Javier and tries to explain the situation, but he breaks up with her; she is even more frustrated given that it is the last day she was supposed to turn the money in. Raúl, knowing that Pablo still loves Isabela, criticizes him for refusing to accept the truth and not having been there for her when she needed him the most, inspiring him to make things right with María before leaving. He also suggests to Gerry that they locate the Avenger in order to get to the bottom of the mystery. It is revealed that Sofía never actually took the pills and staged her accident to mislead the attacker. She and Javier admit to being wrong to trust their former partners and team up again to keep searching for the culprit. Quintanilla is upset at Susana for ruining his engagement to Nora as she happened to be the one who told Güero about the affair, explaining that she couldn't keep letting Raúl blackmail her. Meanwhile, María is informed that Natalia has been kidnapped and the dealers demand the money paid that night, threatening to kill Natalia if the police get involved. Claudia decides to help her and they also manage to sort out the problem with the kiss, with the remorseful Pablo tagging along. As Gerry enters the school, Raúl is attacked again by the Avenger and snatches from him the same gun that was once used by Gerry to kill him and got Javier accidentally injured, which Raúl kept hidden after finding him. Sofía deduces that the Avenger is Alex; she buried Ernesto and Dario, spray-painted the lockers, set Luis's house on fire, poisoned María, assaulted Natalia, simulated her own kidnapping and left Quintanilla to be stung by the bees, as she wanted everyone to feel as guilty as she was for Luis's death, angered at their indifference after they did nothing about it. It is also revealed that she had stolen Raúl's money, a mistake she made "out of love", in order to start a new life with Gabriela, initially contemplating on abandoning her Avenger plans to be with her, but still carrying on after she had left. Alex then threatens Gerry into jumping off the roof. However, Sofía manages to talk her out of it, saying that she is not a murderer, and the repented Alex sobbingly apologizes to Sofía. Javier then picks up the gun and aims at Raúl, demanding his money to save Natalia's life, but Raúl defiantly refuses; earlier, Javier had tipped off María and Claudia about the money's location. María and Claudia attempt to steal the money from Luis's locker, but they are caught by Susana, and the trio heads to the roof after Javier's yelling attracts their attention. Sofía, Javier, Raúl, María, Claudia and Susana then wrestle over the money bag, ending with Susana and the bag falling off the roof, killing her in the process. Witnessing this from the ground, Pablo snatches up the money and drives off, while Javier, Alex, Gerry and Claudia look on in horror, but Sofía, Raúl and María don't show emotion and stand over the edge of the roof looking at Susana's lifeless corpse. The season ends with another aerial shot zooming out. Target of the Avenger: Gerry, who was vainly forced to jump off the roof as a way to pay for Luis's death with his life.

=== Season 3 (2022) ===
No. overall	No. in season	Title	Directed by	Written by	Original release date
17	1	"Did You Think I Would Forget About You?" (Spanish: "¿Creías que me iba a olvidar de ti?)	Alejandro Lozano & Bernardo de la Rosa	Miguel García Moreno	6 July 2022
Fifteen months after Susana's death, the kids have moved on and are about to graduate; Sofía and Javier have entered a relationship, Pablo and Claudia become good friends, Gerry is doing community service at a juvenile detention centre to own up for his previous actions and Raúl currently lives at a luxurious hotel after all of his money is given up for Natalia's ransom. María and Natalia, on the other hand, have left the city after their parents found out about her kidnapping. With her death ruled as a suicide and the body nowhere to be found, the group makes a pact to keep their involvement a secret so that their futures won't be tarnished. Meanwhile, during a party he is hosting, @_allyoursecrets_, the hacker account previously owned by Raúl, resurfaces; a drone shows up and hands him over a note explicitly stating that they know about Susana and have gathered all the proof implicating them as murder accomplices. Sofía and Javier pay Güero, now a depressed alcoholic, a visit where she finds Susana's corpse hidden outside a corner.
18	2	"María?" (Spanish: "¿María?")	Alejandro Lozano & Bernardo de la Rosa	Luis Gamboa	6 July 2022
Pablo is contacted by an unknown person and is convinced that it is María, although no one believes him. Raúl struggles with financial issues after he is given an ultimatum by the new principal over his pending school tuition. Sofía is chosen by her classmates to do the graduation speech. While practicing on an escape room center, Javier is seemingly injured by someone. Gerry recalls his bullying past with Luis while witnessing his fellow inmates pick on Bernardo, a harmless boy resembling his late former friend. Sofía visits her father, where he tells her the possibility of him being set free. At a drama class, Claudia, Alex and Pablo are asked to recreate a story similar to Susana's incident, leaving all of them shaken and unable to proceed; Claudia accuses Alex of turning in the exercise, but she truthfully denies it. To get rid of doubts, Sofía and Javier approach Bruno, who was previously imprisoned for helping Raúl with the school's hacking, to help them trace the contact, leading both of them to a motel room, where they are met by Natalia who announces that María is dead.
19	3	"You Have Reached Your Destination" (Spanish: "Has llegado a tu destino")	Bernardo de la Rosa & Alejandro Lozano	Mariana Palos	6 July 2022
A flashback shows María, after she and Natalia moved to Acapulco with their parents in light of her sister's kidnapping (which proved to be the last straw for the sudden decision), going through a depression phase after the whole Susana situation ended up traumatizing her, eventually causing María to commit suicide by drowning. Despite María's death, Sofía nevertheless decides to keep an eye on Natalia by convincing her to move in with her; she also deduces that Natalia ran away from Acapulco behind her parents' backs under the pretext of attending the careers fair in order to seek answers behind the new hacker. Raúl suspects something is wrong when he repeatedly refreshes his bank account app. Since he is still unable to afford the hotel, he flees. Sofía, Javier and Alex suspect that Sebastián, Claudia's drama teacher, who is dating her despite being a student, might be @_allyoursecrets_ because of the drama exercise recreating Susana's death. Sofía questions Claudia, who refuses to give up any information. The hacker creates a misunderstanding between Pablo and Claudia when posing as both her and Sebastián, causing Claudia to mistakenly assume that Pablo reverted to the toxic person he was before. Gerry calls Raúl out for involving him in his financial issues as he doesn't want to violate his sentence. The hacker orders Raúl to open a live streaming while riding his motorcycle. After arriving at a destination in the middle of the street, Pablo accidentally crashes into Raúl's motorcycle and his car flips over, leaving Pablo seriously injured. At the same time, Claudia lets Sofía know that the exercise has Pablo's name signed on it.
20	4	"Open Wounds" (Spanish: "Heridas abiertas")	Bernardo de la Rosa & Alejandro Lozano	Miguel García Moreno & Mariel Segovia	6 July 2022
Pablo gets hospitalized after his accident; there, Sofía and Javier find out that @_allyoursecrets_ took advantage of his vulnerability following the confrontation with Claudia, manipulating him into driving drunk and almost attempting to kill Raúl. Adrián, a football player who bullies Javier, is attacked by one of the hackers, mistaking him for Javier as he had previously stolen his school sweater, crippling both of his legs and bounding him to a wheelchair. Natalia reveals to Sofía, Javier and Raúl that @_allyoursecrets_ sent her in to spy on them as she started to suspect that something was off when she saw the article of Susana's death and that everything she does is to seek justice for María. Pressured by her, Claudia and Raúl are forced to reveal to Natalia their involvement. Meanwhile, Gerry meets up with Luis' mother when they both visit his grave, and she takes him to an LGBTQ+ refugee, having become more open-minded upon finding out about her son's sexual orientation; Gerry also admits to Bernardo the fateful day when he killed Luis after Rosita accidentally mentioned him while randomly running into them. After being told by Javier's mother that he went to live with his father, Sofía goes through his bedroom and, starting to put all of the pieces together, realizes that Javier's father was the one who hid Susana's corpse under the condition that he return to playing football even though he hates it. As Javier shows up looking for Sofía, she demands an explanation.
21	5	"Helena" (Spanish: "Helena")	Bernardo de la Rosa & Alejandro Lozano	Luis Gamboa	6 July 2022
In a flashback to the night of Susana's death, after Sofía fainted and got drugged, Javier turned to his father, who hired some people to hide the body inside Güero's home; Javier didn't know until very much later and couldn't find a proper way to tell Sofía, who in response breaks up with him. @_allyoursecrets_ orders Natalia to send pictures of Sofía's house and her school schedule in return of telling her the cause of María's suicide. Alex tries to warn Claudia about Sebastián, who only gave her a role for an upcoming play just because they're dating, but she doesn't believe her. Just as the hearing of Sofía's father is about to begin, however, it's cut short when the lawyer representing him abruptly drops out of the case. It turns out that the lawyer was hired by Raúl, who traded his watch in a futile attempt to pay him the amount of money he owed following his eviction; although Sofía keeps making it clear she doesn't need his help, Raúl professes his feelings for her. Coincidentally, Javier arrives at Sofía's where Natalia, who was taking a dip in the bathtub, tells him that she wanted to feel closer to María. Just as they kiss, Javier backs out and admits to the role he played with his father in hiding Susana's body. Sofía finds a drone from the hacker that has an address code which (after decoding it with Alex and Ernesto) leads her to the home of a young woman who she bumped with some days ago when she visited her father. The woman reveals herself to be also a daughter of Sofía's father, leaving Sofía heartbroken. One of the hackers breaks into the hospital and attempts to asphyxiate Pablo to death. Javier chases a kid who is involved with @_allyoursecrets_ who claims that there's a lot of them.
22	6	"Game Master" (Spanish: "Gamer Master")	Bernardo de la Rosa & Alejandro Lozano	Mariana Palos	6 July 2022
Sofía confronts her father for lying about his past and decides that him staying imprisoned is enough punishment for his actions. Meanwhile, Javier gathers the group, save for Pablo and Gerry, to improvise a plan. However, Sofía grows impatient and calls the hacker, and they, in response, instruct each of them to turn one of their friends in, having until 5pm to do so, only for the rest to abruptly back out after Claudia starts throwing accusations of who might be the hacker, making Sofía the Game Master. On the hacker's orders, Raúl violently trashes the cafeteria while Sofía records it in her cellphone, getting himself expelled in the process; Javier also kicks Raúl out of his house. Later on, using the identity of the kid Javier tackled earlier, she logs in a computer to find the cult's current location and uses a mask left behind to blend in. After running out of time, the hacker forces Sofía to post the secrets of her friends so their involvement in Susana's death won't be exposed, including Pablo's drunk driving, Claudia's relationship with the drama teacher, telling on Natalia to her parents for running away and outing Gerry as gay, later resulting in him getting brutally beaten up by the homophobic inmates. As for Raúl, he is lured into a trap trying to seek a new home and gets kidnapped by the cult. Sofía realizes that Alex was indirectly responsible for Raúl's kidnapping as she gave him a fake address. She begs them to let Raúl go, to no avail as they threaten to expose the truth should Sofía tell anyone about this.
23	7	"I Am @allyoursecrets" (Spanish: "Yo soy @todotusssecretos")	Bernardo de la Rosa & Alejandro Lozano	Mariana Palos & Luis Gamboa	6 July 2022
Raúl confesses to being behind the hackings, turning most of the student body against Sofía, including her friends, deeming her irrational when she repeatedly claims that he is in danger and only made the confession under threat; the principal also threatens to deprive Sofía from doing the speech, but Quintanilla vouches for her. Gerry is allowed to serve his two last months at his home, but since he doesn't want to return to his parents, he tries desperately to find a new place to live. Luis's mother empathizes with his situation and decides to become his legal guardian and give him shelter at her home. Natalia is to depart for Acapulco after being caught on her lie. However, Javier, realizing that he still loves her, rushes to the terminal, arriving in time just as the bus was about to leave and begs Natalia to stay by admitting his feelings for her. Although Alex doesn't believe Sofía about Raúl getting kidnapped, she does agree to look on the kid's backpack in case she finds any leads. After hearing that Ernesto won a contest, she questions him and deduces that he was the one who put the drama exercise with Pablo's name on it and the hacker got ahold of each of the group's individual graduation videos through a pendrive from Quintanilla's computer. Sofía also learns that Bruno was the one who gave Ernesto the instructions in exchange for money. Confronting him, Bruno reveals to Sofía that he is @_allyoursecrets_ and blames Raúl, who used to pass him money to protect him in jail while being the scapegoat for all of his crimes, until the inmates started beating him up after he stopped fulfilling his part of the deal; following his release, Bruno was no longer allowed to touch any computer or able to get a job. Despite this, Bruno violated the order and hacked into Raúl's phone, where he found out about Sofía and the group's involvement in Susana's death. In addition, he opened a forum named "No Impunity" to share his plight, which gained him a lot of followers who have been through a similar situation concerning the school's rich kids and how they always manage to get away with everything through their connections. Initially skeptical because his followers are out of his hands, Bruno decides to take Sofía to the lair where Raúl is held captive. However, Sofía is cornered and captured while making her way inside.
24	8	"Graduation" (Spanish: "Graduación")	Alejandro Lozano & Bernardo de la Rosa	Miguel García Moreno	6 July 2022
As the graduation ceremony approaches, Gerry turns to the group for help as he suspects that someone is impersonating Raúl's contact. His claims are initially dismissed but immediately backed up by Alex, who confirms Sofía's theory by finding a QR code on a drawing that led her to the "No Impunity" forum, in which they locate the cell where Sofía and Raúl are held hostage. They also realize that @_allyoursecrets_ intends to project Susana's real cause of death during the graduation. Javier, Natalia, Pablo and Gerry go to rescue Sofía and Raúl while Alex and Claudia go to the school to prevent the video from being played. Recalling some tricks she learned on escape rooms, Sofía and Raúl manage to outsmart the hackers by escaping through a ventilation duct, leaving three of them locked up. On their way out, they encounter and release Güero, who was also captured. Meanwhile, Javier and the others manage to enter after he breaks the gates open with his father's car. The video of the students, alongside the group's involvement in Susana's death, is played, but Alex and Claudia manage to stop it in time. However, Güero sees the video back at the lair and, in a fit of rage, attempts to kill Sofía and Raúl as revenge for lying to him, then attacks Javier, Pablo and Gerry as well, until Natalia, who stayed behind to guard, steps in and hits him in the head when he attempts to choke Javier. Realizing that Bruno lied to her and was just using them as pawns, Sofía asks the other hackers, who were a bunch of kids blackmailed into doing his dirty work, to remove their masks and they all turn on him. The group then rushes back to the school graduation, where Sofía gives her speech and expresses their culpability in Susana's death, resulting in them being sentenced to do community service for it and Javier's father getting imprisoned for his secondary role in hiding the corpse. A few months later, Sofía and Javier meet up at a cafe where Javier tells her that he thinks Raúl has been @_allyoursecrets_ all along as he schemed everything to keep them separated from each other. Nevertheless, Sofía laughingly dismisses this theory and leaves, but she doesn't tell Raúl when she catches up with him outside and they ride off in his motorcycle into the distance.
