= My Girlfriend Is the Revolution =

- Film poster
- Directed by: Marcelino Islas Hernández
- Written by: Marcelino Islas Hernández; Gabriela Vidal
- Produced by: Camila Barbará; Aida Herrerias; Marcelino Islas Hernández; Daniela Leyva Becerra Acosta; Fernando Montes de Oca; Andrea Toca
- Starring: Sofía Islas; Ana Valeria Becerril; Flor Edwarda
- Cinematography: Rodrigo Sandoval
- Edited by: Eduardo Palenque
- Production companies: Benuca Films; Un beso
- Release dates: October 4, 2021 (FICG); October 17, 2021 (Rome)
- Running time: 104 minutes
- Country: Mexico
- Language: Spanish

My Girlfriend Is the Revolution (Spanish: Mi novia es la revolución) is a 2021 Mexican coming-of-age romance film directed by Marcelino Islas Hernández and written by Hernández & Gabriela Vidal. It stars Sofía Islas, Ana Valeria Becerril and Flor Edwarda.

== Synopsis ==
After the separation of her parents, Sofía lives her boring life with her younger sister so much that she does not want a quinceañera party. Everything will change when she meets Eva, a girl with a rebellious attitude with whom she will discover love and the disappointments that come with it.

== Cast ==
The actors participating in this film are:

- Sofia Islas as Sofía
- Ana Valeria Becerril as Eva
- Renata Lopez as Jime
- Edwarda Gurrola as Sara
- Martha Claudia Moreno as Amelia
- Mauro Sánchez Navarro as Beto's
- Magda Vizcaíno as Mela
- Pedro Hernández
- Verónica Langer
- Ana Lorena Rodríguez
- Flor Eduarda Gurrola
- Paco Rueda

== Production ==
Principal photography began on August 28, 2020, and ended on September 17, 2020, in Las Arboledas, Mexico.

== Release ==
The film had its premiere on October 4, 2021, at the 36th Guadalajara International Film Festival competing for the Maguey Award. On October 17, 2021, it was shown at the Rome Film Festival as part of the official selection.

== Accolades ==
Year	Award	Category	Recipient	Result	Ref.
2021	Guadalajara International Film Festival	Maguey Award	Marcelino Islas Hernández	Nominated	
2021	Rome Film Festival	FS Audience Award	Marcelino Islas Hernández	Nominated	
2022	Monterrey International Film Festival	Best Mexican Fiction Feature Film	Marcelino Islas Hernández	Won	
