= This Is Not Berlin =

2019 Mexican film

- Directed by: Hari Sama
- Written by: Rodrigo Ordoñez; Max Zunino
- Cinematography: Alfredo Altamirano
- Edited by: Ximena Cuevas; Rodrigo Ríos; Hari Sama
- Music by: Dalí Lantzeta
- Production companies: Catatonia Films; La Palma de Oro Films
- Distributed by: Samuel Goldwyn Films
- Release dates: 25 January 2019 (Sundance); 21 June 2019 (Spain)
- Running time: 115 minutes
- Country: Mexico
- Language: Spanish

This Is Not Berlin (Spanish: Esto no es Berlín), is a 2019 Mexican coming of age drama film directed by Hari Sama. The film was presented on 25 January 2019 at the Sundance Festival, and it premiered on 21 June 2019 in Spain. Sama portrays the film as autobiographical, as it is inspired by his life in the 80s in Mexico.

== Plot ==
Carlos, a seventeen-year-old boy in Mexico City, doesn't fit in anywhere: neither in his family nor with his friends from school. He and his best friend Gera sell his father's nude magazines to his classmates at school. Even though he rejects his family's desire for him to become an engineer, Carlos is fond of fixing electronics. In exchange for fixing a friend's electric keyboard, he is given a ride to the mythical nightclub called the Aztek, where the friend's band does frequent gigs. He discovers the underground through the club.

At soccer practice the next day, Gera's teammates tell him that club is full of gays and male prostitutes, but they decide they want to go back anyways. His next time there, Carlos improvises electronic lighting decorations which improve the band's performance and wins crowd admiration. He meets Nico, who takes him to a secret room filled with surreal artists who practice bisexual freedom, film pornography and consume all types of drugs. He is given an inhalable substance and witnesses a modern art critic leaving the building, claiming they lack originality and copy too much from European artists, hence the title "This is not Berlin."

Gera steals his father's car so they can return to the club but they are denied entry. The car is broken into and the stereo is stolen, leading to Gera and his sister Rita to be punished. They still find ways around it and Carlos continues his descent into the club. His mother is also undergoing a mental health crisis with severe mood swings - between being hysterically angry and sleeping all day. Sometimes he has to cook for his younger brother.

Carlos begins participating more actively in the surreal activities, which include public nudity and bizarre gory performances. He shaves part of his head and begins to skip school. Gera and his former friend group turns against him and vandalizes his desk. Nico starts making sexual advances towards Carlos but he is not ready. Carlos' uncle who taught him about electronics suddenly dies. This makes him dive deeper into the club and start participating in its public acts.

At a send-off for the soccer team, the group stages a demonstration with projected footage of the supposed team members having sex with each other. Back at the club, both Gera and Carlos get into one night stands, Carlos with an unknown woman and Gera with a male friend of Carlos'. Nico walks in on Carlos. Gera is found unconscious lying near a toilet. Carlos rescues him and takes him out to his family.

The police raid and condemn the club and arrest everyone in it, including all of the main characters. In the hospital, Gera and Carlos reconcile, where Gera reveals his homosexuality.

== Cast ==
- Xabiani Ponce de León as Carlos
- José Antonio Toledano as Gera
- Mauro Sánchez Navarro as Nico
- Klaudia García as Maud
- Ximena Romo as Rita
- Américo Hollander as Tito
- Hari Sama as Esteban
- Marina de Tavira as Carolina
- Lumi Cavazos as Susana
- Fernando Álvarez Rebeil as Quiñones
- David Montalvo as Ajo

== Reception ==
=== Critical response ===
On review aggregator Rotten Tomatoes, the film holds an approval rating of 82% based on 50 reviews, with an average rating of 7.2/10. The site's critical consensus reads, "This Is Not Berlin uses one young man's sexual and cultural awakening as the fuel for a personal story with widely resonant themes."

== Awards and nominations ==
| Year | Award | Category | Recipient | Result |
|---|---|---|---|---|
| 2019 | Tribeca Film Festival | Best International Narrative Feature | Tribeca Critics' Week (Note: Multiple Nominee's: Ale García (producer), Antonio Urdapilleta (producer), Verónica Valadez (producer), Hari Sama (producer), Catatonia Films (production Company), and La Palma de Oro Films (co-production company).) | Nominated |
| 2019 | Sundance Film Festival | World Cinema – Dramatic | Hari Sama | Nominated |
| 2019 | Seattle International Film Festival | Ibero American Competition | Hari Sama | Nominated |
| 2019 | San Sebastián International Film Festival | Best Latin American Film | Hari Sama | Nominated |
| 2019 | Málaga Spanish Film Festival | Special Jury Award | Hari Sama | Special |
| 2019 | Málaga Spanish Film Festival | Best Supporting Actor | Mauro Sánchez Navarro | Won |
| 2019 | Málaga Spanish Film Festival | Best Cinematography | Alfredo Altamirano | Won |
| 2019 | Málaga Spanish Film Festival | Special Critics Award | Hari Sama | Special |
| 2019 | Miami Film Festival | Best Film | This Is Not Berlin | Nominated |
| 2019 | Lima Latin American Film Festival | Best Film | Hari Sama | Nominated |
| 2019 | GLAAD Media Award | Outstanding Film – Limited Release | This Is Not Berlin | Nominated |
