= Mauro Sánchez Navarro =

Mexican actor

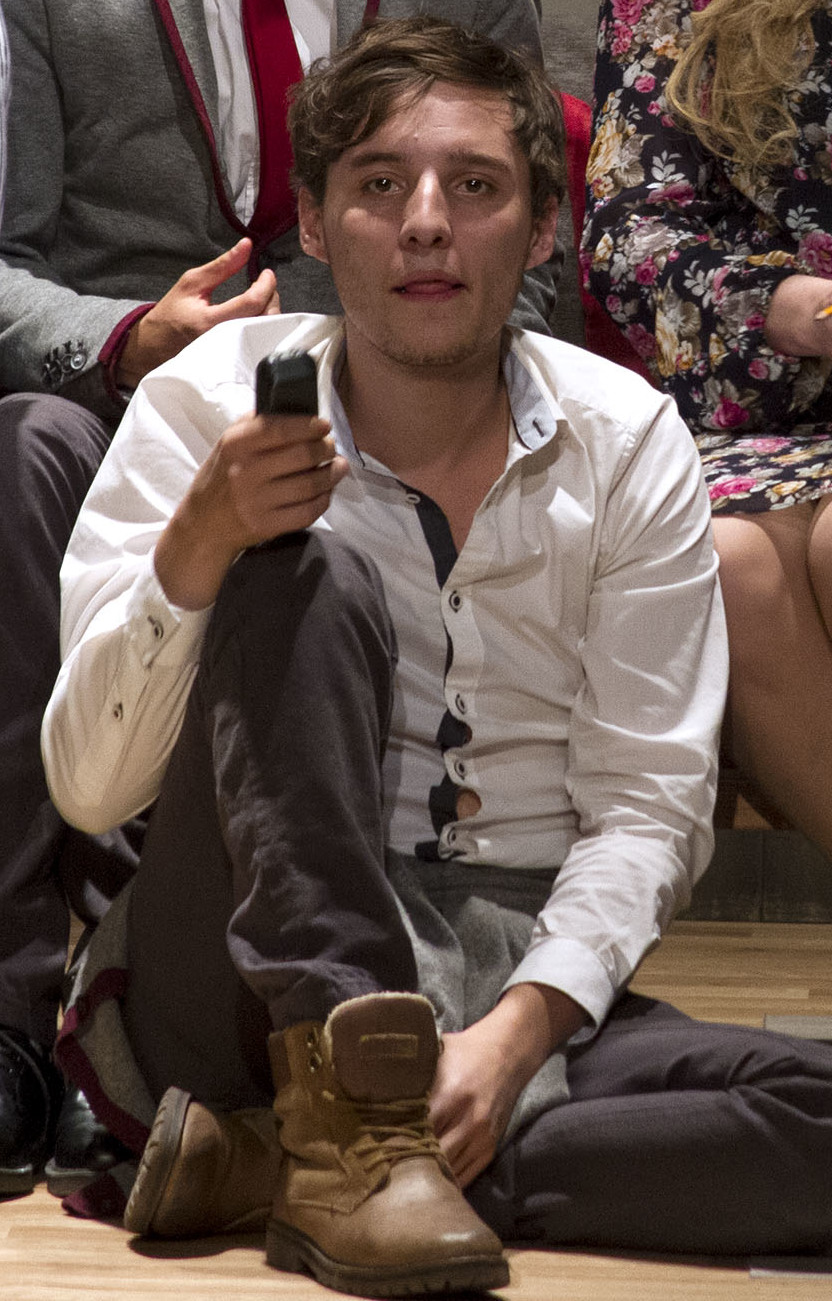
- Sánchez Navarro in 2015
- Born: 3 October 1994 (age 30); Mexico City, Mexico
- Occupation: Actor
- Years active: 2010–present

Mauro Sánchez Navarro (born 3 October 1994 in Mexico City, Mexico) is a Mexican actor; best known for his role of Nico in the Mexican film This Is Not Berlin, film for which he won as Best Supporting Actor at the 2019 Málaga Spanish Film Festival. Despite having made himself known as an actor in the cinema, Sánchez Navarro has appeared on television in recurring roles in several Mexican telenovelas.

== Filmography ==
=== Film roles ===
Year	Title	Roles	Notes
2014	El guión	Mauro	Short film
2016	Necropolis, They Will Be Ashes But Still Will Feel	Andrés	Short film
2017	Como te ves me vi	Marco	
2019	This Is Not Berlin	Nico	
2021	My Girlfriend Is the Revolution	Beto's	

=== Television roles ===
Year	Title	Roles	Notes
2010–2013	La rosa de Guadalupe	Julio Samuel Tito	Episode: "El amor no tiene edad" Episode: "Recobrar la confianza" Episode: "A prueba de todo"
2014	The Stray Cat	Child Garabato	3 episodes
2014	Como dice el dicho	Adrián Juan Carlos	Episode: "En la cama y en la cárcel" Episode: "No hay guapo sin defecto"
2016	La candidata	Hugo	Recurring role; 7 episodes
2017	La Doña	Manuel	Recurring role (season 1); 3 episodes
2017	Érase una vez	Marco Arbizu	Episode: "Pinocho"
2018	Atrapada	Unknown role	Recurring role; 6 episodes
2018	Señora Acero	Petronilo Godinez "El Marrano Mayor"	Recurring role (season 5); 20 episodes
2020, 2022	Control Z	Bruno	7 episodes

== Awards and nominations ==
Year	Award	Category	Nominated works	Result
2019	Málaga Spanish Film Festival	Best Supporting Actor	This Is Not Berlin	Won
