= Pierre Louis (actor) =

Mexican TV actor

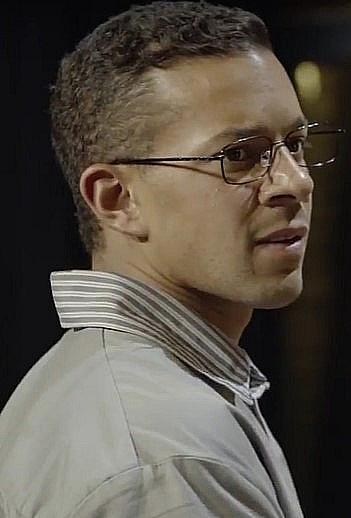
- Louis in 2018
- Born: Mexico City, Mexico
- Occupation: Actor
- Years active: 2011–present

Pierre Louis (born in Mexico City, Mexico) is a Mexican actor; best known for his role as Centavito in the Mexican telenovela The Stray Cat. Subsequently, he obtained a regular role in the telenovela Enamorándome de Ramón, a Mexican version of the Venezuelan telenovela Tomasa Tequiero. Louis has mostly excelled in stage, in Mexican plays such as The Lion King (2015), a Mexican adaptation of the American musical. El corazón de las albercas (2017), and a Spanish adaptation of the plays Argonautika by Mary Zimmerman (2019), and The Pillowman by Martin McDonagh (2019).

== Filmography ==
=== Films ===
Year	Title	Roles	Notes
2019	El hubiera sí existe	Samuel	

=== Television roles ===
Year	Title	Roles	Notes
2011–2013	La rosa de Guadalupe	Teo Román	Episode: "El color de los sentimientos" Episode: "La música del amor"
2013–2014	De que te quiero, te quiero	Paolo	Series regular; 157 episodes
2014	The Stray Cat	Centavito	Series regular; 80 episodes
2015–2018	Como dice el dicho	Various roles	12 episodes
2016	Por Siempre Joan Sebastian	Unknown role	Episode: "El asesinato de Rodrigo"
2017	Enamorándome de Ramón	Jorge	Series regular; 105 episodes
2017–2018	Caer en tentación	Gustavo / Bernardo Galindo Pérez	Series regular; 56 episodes
2018	El secreto de Selena	Ed Mckinstry	Episode: "Paralelos"
2019	Ringo	Javier "Gavilán Machaca"	Series regular; 81 episodes
2019	La reina soy yo	Axel	Series regular; 67 episodes
2019	La usurpadora	Osvaldo	Series regular; 11 episodes
2021–2022	Control Z	Felipe	5 episodes
2021	Todo va a estar bien	Fausto	4 episodes
2021–2022	SOS Me estoy enamorando	Daniel Soto	Series regular; 97 episodes
2022	Amsterdam	Antonio	Series regular; 7 episodes

=== Music video ===
Year	Song	Singer
2015	"Bajo El Agua"	Manuel Medrano
