= Chiquito de la Calzada =

Spanish stand-up comedian

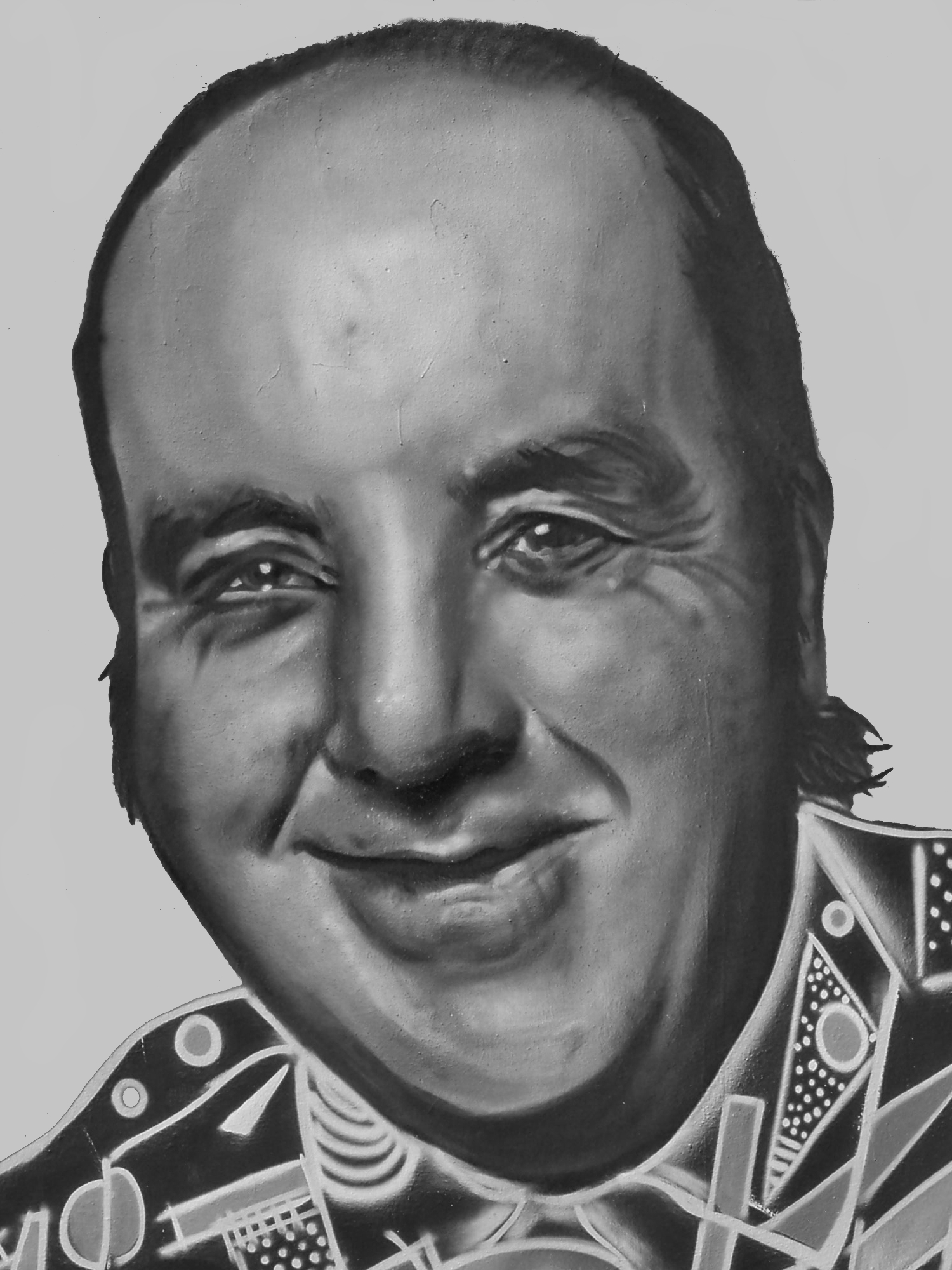
- Born: Gregorio Esteban Sánchez Fernández; 28 May 1932; Málaga, Spain
- Died: 11 November 2017 (aged 85); Hospital Carlos Haya, Málaga, Spain
- Occupations: Actor, comedian, singer
- Spouse: Josefa García Gómez

Gregorio Esteban Sánchez Fernández (28 May 1932 – 11 November 2017), known as Chiquito de la Calzada, was a Spanish flamenco singer and actor, although he rose to fame as a stand-up comedian.

== Career ==
Chiquito de la Calzada became very popular in Spanish TV shows (especially Genio y figura) during the mid-nineties due to his unique style, strongly based on a surreal and histrionic approach to jokes and language, and constant gesticulation and movement while telling his jokes, placing his hands on his waist as if he had lower backache. Some of his characteristic words and expressions such as Fistro or Jarl, as well as his humorous lines or hyperbolic comparisons such as "you work less than Tarzan's tailor" quickly became memes and are now part of Spanish slang.

His moves and jargon were so influential to other Spanish comedians, that some TV characters such as Crispín Klander, Lucas Grijander and Nuñito de la Calzada were entirely built around his image, style and influence. There is a mod for the video game Doom featuring his voice.

On 18 February 2019, he posthumously received the Medalla de Oro al Mérito en las Bellas Artes.

== Personal life ==
His wife, Josefa García Gómez, died in 2012.

== Death ==
On 14 October 2017 he fell down in his home, and he was rescued by the firemen and hospitalized in Málaga, but he recuperated favourably.

On 31 October 2017 he returned to be hospitalized in Hospital Carlos Haya of Málaga, with chest pains and he underwent blood tests. Finally his condition stabilised.

On 10 November 2017, his health worsened, so he was induced into a coma and was moved to the intensive care unit. He died on 11 November 2017 from complications of cardiac catheterization.

== Filmography ==
=== Film ===
- Aquí llega Condemor, el pecador de la pradera (1996)
- Brácula: Condemor II (1997)
- Papá Piquillo (1998)
- Franky Banderas (2003)
- El oro de Moscú (2003)
- Spanish Movie (2009)
- La venganza de Ira Vamp (2010)
- Torrente 5 (2014)

=== Television ===
- Genio y figura (1994–1995, Antena 3)
- Señor alcalde (1998, Telecinco)
- ¡Ala... Dina! (2000, TVE)
- El burladero (2000–2001, TVE)
- Mucho que perder, poco que ganar (2011, La Sexta)
