= Ana Valeria Becerril =

Mexican actress (born 1997)

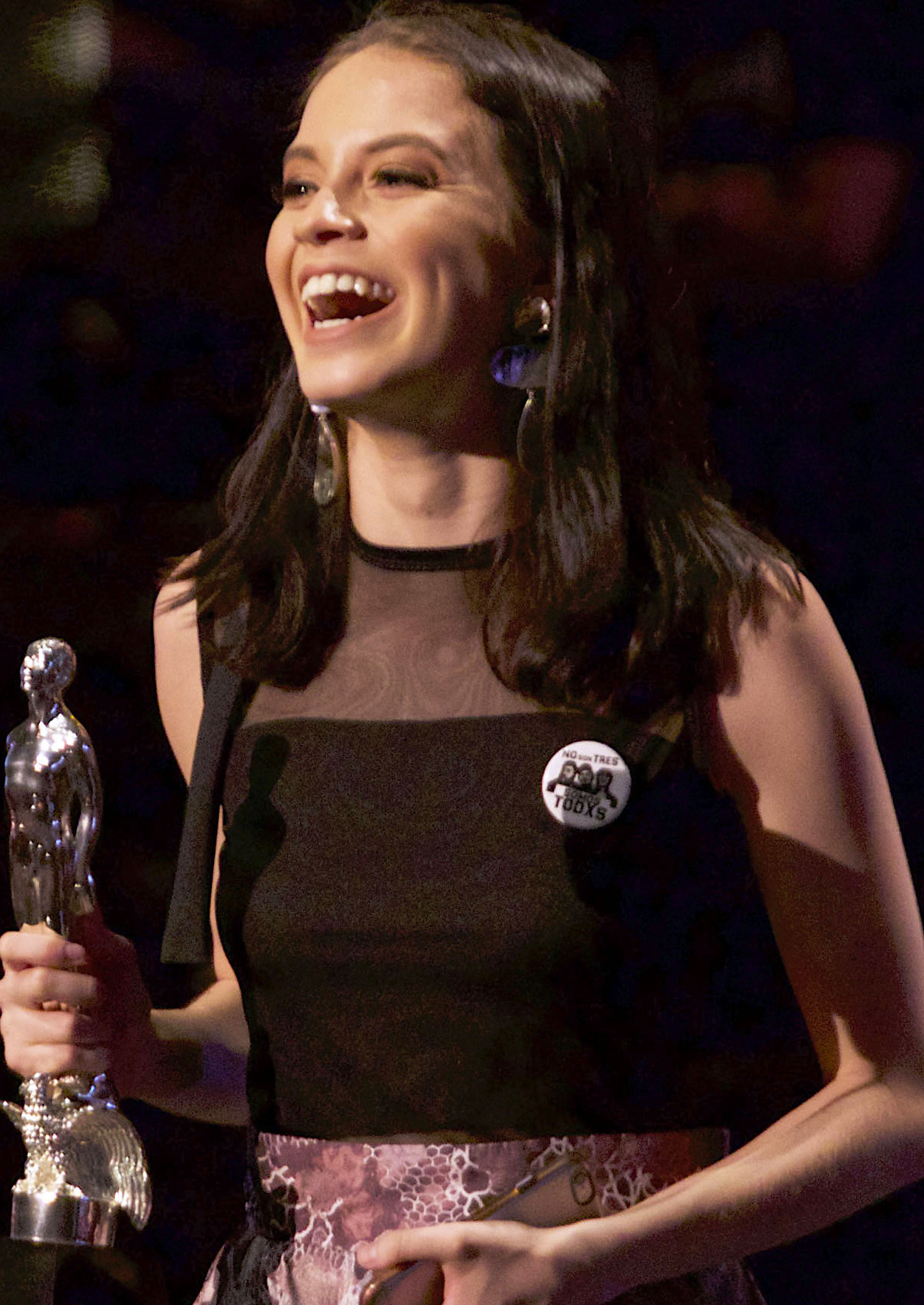
- Becerril at 60th Ariel Awards
- Born: 4 January 1997 (age 29); Mexico City, Mexico
- Occupation: Actress
- Years active: 2016–present

Ana Valeria Becerril (born 4 January 1997) is a Mexican actress. She has starred in April's Daughter and Control Z.

== Life and career ==
Ana Valeria Becerril was born on 4 January 1997 in Mexico City, Mexico. She started her career in 2016 with the short film Magnífico and in the same year, she played as Camila in Camila. In 2017, she starred in April's Daughter. She received several acting awards for this film. In 2019, she played as Lucy in Muerte al Verano. In 2020, she began appearing as Sofía in the Netflix series Control Z. In 2020, she starred in the short film Aire de lluvia and in the same year, she played as Eva in Mi novia es la revolución. In 2021, she played the lead role Gina in Los Dias Que No Estuve.

== Filmography ==
Short film
| Year | Title | Role |
|---|---|---|
| 2016 | Magnífico | Paula |
| 2016 | Camila | Camila |
| 2020 | Aire de lluvia | Daniela |
Film
| Year | Title | Role |
| 2017 | April's Daughter | Valeria |
| 2019 | Muerte al Verano | Lucy |
| 2021 | Los Dias Que No Estuve | Gina |
| 2021 | My Girlfriend Is the Revolution | Eva |
| 2023 | ¿Cómo matar a mamá? | Teté |
Television
| Year | Title | Role |
| 2020–2022 | Control Z | Sofía Herrera |
| 2022–present | Las Bravas F.C. | Claudia |
| 2024 - present | Las Hermanas Guerra | Jacinta/Itzel |

== Awards ==
| Year | Award name | Category | Nominated work | Result | Ref. |
|---|---|---|---|---|---|
| 2017 | CANACINE Awards | Best Female Promise | April's Daughter | Won | |
| 2018 | 60th Ariel Awards | Breakthrough Female Performance | April's Daughter | Won | |
