= ¡Ala... Dina! =

- Genre: Sitcom
- Created by: Paco Arango
- Directed by: José Pavón; Rafael de la Cueva
- Starring: Paz Padilla; Miriam Díaz Aroca; Gary Piquer; Lidia San José; José Gonzálvez
- Country of origin: Spain
- Original language: Spanish
- No. of seasons: 3
- No. of episodes: 63

Production
- Producer: Paco Arango
- Camera setup: Multi-camera
- Running time: 36 min. (approx.)
- Production company: Televisión Española

Original release
- Network: TVE1
- Release: January 4, 2000 – December 25, 2002

¡Ala... Dina! is a Spanish television sitcom that was broadcast on La Primera Cadena of Televisión Española from January 4, 2000 to December 25, 2002.

The series follows the story of Dina, a genie who after 400 years locked in a magic lamp, is released by the family of Tomás and she is hired as a housekeeper.

== Plot ==
The story begins when the young son of the widower Tomás, Álvaro, finds a magic lamp. After rubbing it, the lamp releases its genie. The genie, calling herself Dina, has been locked up there over 500 years, waiting for someone to release her. Dina is then integrated into the family of Tomás, getting a job as a housekeeper in the home, cleaning, cooking and caring for Álvaro and Eva, the two children of Tomás.

When Tomás discovers the powers of Dina, he prohibits its use. Nevertheless, Dina uses her supernatural abilities at every opportunity.

== Technical and artistic data ==
The series is based on an original idea of Paco Arango. It was directed by José Pavón and Rafael de la Cueva, and produced by Cartel for Televisión Española.

It premiered on 4 January 2000, and was the most watched television program in Spain on its opening day, with 4.9 million viewers and a 27.8% of audience share.

The series stopped airing on December 25 of 2002.

The actress Paz Padilla remained in the cast until the episode aired on May 14, 2001. Then she would be replaced for the same role by Miriam Díaz Aroca.

Paz Padilla was nominated for Best Actress at ATV Awards 2000.

== Main cast and characters ==
- Dina (Paz Padilla/Miriam Díaz Aroca)
- Tomás (Gary Piquer)
- Eva (Lidia San José)
- Álvaro (José Gonzálvez)
- Lucrecia (Mary Carmen Ramírez)
- José María "Chemita" (Darío Paso)
- Paloma Velázquez (Verónica Mengod)
- Sazhim (Santiago Urrialde)
- Rogelio (Alfonso Vallejo)
- Rashid (Eduardo MacGregor)
- Sandra (Sandra Gómez)
- Bolita (Alejandro Rello)
- Rosi (Nathalie Seseña)

Guest Starring:

- Chiquito de la Alcazaba (Chiquito de la Calzada)
- Gina (Ana García Obregón)
- Teresa (Asunción Balaguer)
- Mayra Gómez Kemp
- David Civera
- Doña Francisca (Paloma Cela)
- Kruger (Michael Reckling)
- Gino (Alessandro Lecquio)
- Lorenzo Milá
- Pizza delivery guy (Miguel Ángel Muñoz)
- Francisco
- Carlos Baute
- Zoltán (Mariano Alameda)
- Mustapha (Rappel)
- Soraya (Elisenda Rivas)
- Juan Camus
- Empress Igartíbula (Anne Igartiburu)
