= April's Daughter =

2017 film

April's Daughters
- Film poster
- Spanish: Las hijas de abril
- Directed by: Michel Franco
- Written by: Michel Franco
- Produced by: Michel Franco; Lorenzo Vigas; Moises Zonana
- Starring: Emma Suárez
- Cinematography: Yves Cape
- Edited by: Jorge Weisz
- Production companies: Lucia Films; Trebol Stone
- Distributed by: GEM Entertainment
- Release date: 20 May 2017 (Cannes)
- Running time: 102 minutes
- Country: Mexico
- Language: Spanish

April's Daughters (Spanish: Las hijas de abril) is a 2017 Mexican drama film directed by Michel Franco. It was screened in the Un Certain Regard section at the 2017 Cannes Film Festival, where it won the Jury Prize in that section.

== Plot ==
Valeria (Ana Valeria Becerril), 17, is pregnant. She lives in Puerto Vallarta, with Clara (Joanna Larequi), her half sister, who is calm, but lives with depression and is overweight. Valeria does not want her mother, April (Emma Suárez), who has been absent for a long time, to know about her pregnancy but, due to economic limitations and the overwhelming responsibility of having a baby at home, Clara decides to call her mother. April arrives with a great desire to see her daughters, but we soon see why Valeria did not want to get in touch with her. It is "the story of an adult woman who refuses to feel 'overtaken' by her own daughters in generational terms, without realising that she has been left behind in more important aspects, such as emotional and psychological, among others."

== Cast ==
- Emma Suárez as Abril
- Ana Valeria Becerril as Valeria
- Hernán Mendoza as Gregorio
- Ivan Cortes as Jorge
- Enrique Arrizon as Mateo
- Joanna Larequi as Clara
