= Necropolis, They Will Be Ashes But Still Will Feel =

- Directed by: Mateo Granillo
- Written by: Robert Ascher Villanueva
- Starring: Harold Torres; Mauro Sánchez Navarro; Meraqui Pradis
- Cinematography: Enrique G. Menéndez
- Edited by: Mateo Granillo
- Release date: November 2016 (Buenos Aires Rojo Sangre)
- Running time: 20 minutes
- Country: Mexico
- Language: Spanish

Necropolis, They Will Be Ashes But Still Will Feel (Spanish: Necrópolis, serán ceniza mas tendrá sentido) is a 2016 Mexican horror short film directed by Mateo Granillo. The film premiered at the Buenos Aires Rojo Sangre in November 2016, and is stars Harold Torres, Mauro Sánchez Navarro, and Meraqui Pradis.

== Plot ==
Andrés (Mauro Sánchez Navarro), a young man devastated by the death of his beloved Eva, makes a bet with a ghost: if he manages to go through several trials in the world of the dead, he can revive her. If not, you will have to give him one of his eyes.

== Cast ==
- Harold Torres as Ghost
- Mauro Sánchez Navarro as Andrés
- Meraqui Pradis as Eva
- Mateo Granillo as Dead 3
