= Lidia San José =

Spanish actress

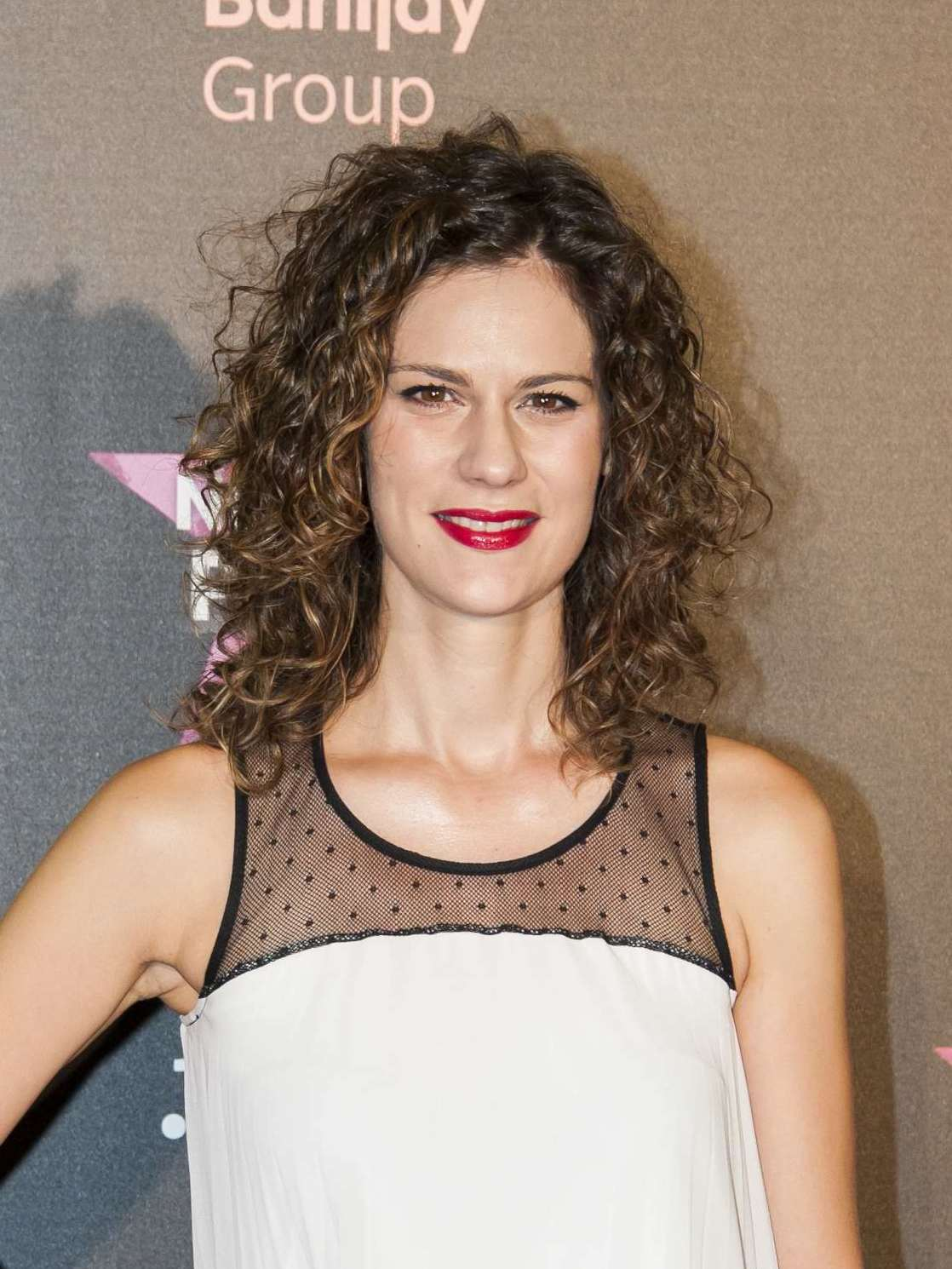
- Born: Lidia San José Segura; 2 January 1983 (age 42); Madrid, Spain
- Occupation: Actress
- Years active: 1995–present

Lidia San José Segura (born 2 January 1983) is a Spanish television and theatre actress.

== Biography ==
San José has a BA in History by the Faculty of Arts of the Complutense University of Madrid, and was a presenter on the Spanish documentary series Reyes de España on History Channel. She has appeared in numerous Spanish television series such as A las once en casa or ¡Ala... Dina!.

In 2006 San José posed for the Spanish edition of Maxim.

In September 2008 she replaced Carmen Morales in the play Olvida los tambores.

In August 2009 she played the role of Carla Bruni in the theater play Escándalo en palacio by Pedro Ruiz.

Her brother is the actor Jorge San José Segura.

== Filmography ==
Year	Film	Role
1995	El nino invisible	Lio
2003	Cosas de brujas	Azucena
Year	Television	Role
1995	¡Ay, Señor, Señor!	Paula
1995	Farmacia de guardia	Gaby
1996	La casa de los líos	Alba
1997	A las once en casa	Lucía
1998	Telepasión española	
2000	¡Ala...Dina!	Eva García León
2004	Diez en Ibiza	Álex
2009	La hora de José Mota	Various roles
2009	Yo soy Bea	Model
2016	Paquita Salas	Herself
2017	Nada personal	Natalia del Castillo
2018	Luis Miguel	Ana
