= Vencer el desamor =

Mexican telenovela

- Genre: Telenovela
- Created by: Pedro Armando Rodríguez; Claudia Velazco
- Written by: Humberto Robles; Alejandra Romero Meza; Gerardo Pérez Zermeño; Gustavo Bracco; Cecilia Oviedo; Claudia Caro Cabello
- Directed by: Benjamín Cann; Fernando Nesme
- Starring: Claudia Álvarez; David Zepeda; Daniela Romo; Altair Jarabo; Juan Diego Covarrubias; Emmanuel Palomares; Julia Urbini; Valentina Buzzurro
- Opening theme: "Vencer el desamor" by Daniela Romo
- Country of origin: Mexico
- Original language: Spanish
- No. of seasons: 1
- No. of episodes: 93

Production
- Executive producer: Rosy Ocampo
- Producer: Silvia Cano
- Production company: Televisa

Original release
- Network: Las Estrellas
- Release: 12 October 2020 – 19 February 2021

Related
- Vencer franchise

Vencer el desamor (English: Overcoming Heartbreak) is a Mexican telenovela that aired on Las Estrellas from 12 October 2020 to 19 February 2021. The series is produced by Rosy Ocampo. The series is part of the "Vencer" franchise, whose first production was Vencer el miedo.

It stars an ensemble cast headed by Daniela Romo, Claudia Álvarez, Julia Urbini, Valentina Buzzurro, David Zepeda, Juan Diego Covarrubias, and Emmanuel Palomares.

== Plot ==
The story revolves around four women, of different ages and social strata, who are forced to live together under the same roof. At first, the coexistence between them is complicated and tense due to their different visions and ways of facing life, but little by little the sisterhood and solidarity prevail when realizing the peculiar bond that exists between them: each one has suffered, in one or otherwise, the absence and abandonment of their respective partners.

== Cast ==
=== Main ===
- Claudia Álvarez as Ariadna López Hernández
- David Zepeda as Álvaro Falcón Albarrán
- Daniela Romo as Bárbara Albarrán de Falcón
- Altair Jarabo as Olga Collado
- Juan Diego Covarrubias as Eduardo Falcón Albarrán
- Emmanuel Palomares as Gael Falcón Albarrán and Rommel Guajardo
- Julia Urbini as Dafne Falcón Miranda
- Valentina Buzzurro as Gemma Corona
- Alfredo Gatica as Cuauhtémoc "Cuau" Vargas
- Issabela Camil as Linda Brown
- Josh Gutiérrez as Néstor Ibarra
- José Elías Moreno Jr. as Joaquín Falcón Ruiz
- Christian de la Campa as Paulo
- Alejandra García as Romina Inunza
- Lourdes Reyes as Josefina Miranda
- Claudia Ríos as Levita Corona
- Raquel Morell as Imelda
- Patricia Martinez as Martha
- Francisco Avendaño as Eugenio
- Bárbara Falconi as Cassandra Ríos
- Ivan Carranza as Humberto
- Paco Luna as Juanjo
- Mildred Feuchter as Ivette
- Gabriela Zas as Yola
- Tizoc Arroyo as Calixto
- Moisés Manzano as Onofre Corona
- Jorge Alberto Bolaños as Silvestre Salmerón
- Iker García Meza as Tadeo Falcón López
- Mía Martínez as Clara María "Clarita" Ibarra Falcón
- Leonardo Daniel as Lino Ferrer (episodes 43–49)
- Beatriz Moreno as Doña Efigenia "Efi" Cruz
- Mauricio García-Muela as Guillermo "Memo" Estévez
- Ricardo Baranda as Bruno
- Mariana Espinoza as Erika
- Andrés Vásquez as Dimitri "Dimi"
- Axel Araiza as Poncho
- Elena Lizarraga as Elena
- Carlos Bonavides as Father Antero
- Ariane Pellicer as Guadalupe "Lupe" Guajardo
- Marco Treviño as Lino Ferrer (episodes 52–93)

=== Special guest stars ===
- Paulina Goto as Marcela Durán
- Beng Zeng as Marco Arizpe "La Liendre"
- Jonathan Becerra as El Yeison
- Anna Ciocchetti as Refugio

== Production ==
The telenovela was announced at the NAPTE 2020 event with the working title El ya no vive aquí. In February 2020 it was announced that the production would be part of the "Vencer" franchise. The cast was officially announced on 14 March 2020. Filming was scheduled to begin in April 2020 and the telenovela would premiere on 13 July 2020. However, on 30 March 2020, Televisa announced that it had suspended filming of their telenovelas. Production officially began on 30 June 2020 and concluded on 16 December 2020.

== Ratings ==
=== Mexico ratings ===
Viewership and ratings per season of Vencer el desamor
Season	Timeslot (CT)	Episodes	First aired		Last aired		Avg. viewers (millions)
Season	Timeslot (CT)	Episodes	Date	Viewers (millions)	Date	Viewers (millions)	Avg. viewers (millions)
1	Mon–Fri 8:30 p.m.	88 (Note: Should reflect the number of episodes that contribute to the average given in the last column.)	12 October 2020	3.5	19 February 2021	4.0	3.47

=== U.S. ratings ===
Viewership and ratings per season of Vencer el desamor
Season	Timeslot (ET)	Episodes	First aired		Last aired		Avg. viewers (millions)
Season	Timeslot (ET)	Episodes	Date	Viewers (millions)	Date	Viewers (millions)	Avg. viewers (millions)
1	Mon–Fri 8:00 p.m.	88	9 November 2020	1.59	30 March 2021	2.06	1.71

== Episodes ==
No.	Title	Mexico air date	U.S. air date	Mexico viewers (millions)	U.S. viewers (millions)
1	"Nuestros sueños"	12 October 2020 (Note: Premiered early online through Las Estrellas website on 9 October 2020.)	9 November 2020	3.5	1.59
Ariana learns that her son Tadeo has Asperger's syndrome, Bárbara suffers from Joaquín's retirement plans, Dafne gives birth to Santi and Cuauhtémoc buys Gemma.
2	"Sexto sentido"	13 October 2020	10 November 2020	3.6	1.60
Bárbara and her sons suffer the death of Joaquín. Tadeo suffers a crisis at school, Ariadna and Eduardo because of this. Dafne does not accept Néstor's death. Levita accepts Cuauhtémoc's money.
3	"Salirse de control"	14 October 2020	11 November 2020	3.2	1.78
Álvaro resigns from the office. Bárbara overhears a conversation between Eduardo and Ariadna and confronts her; she assures her that she is not the woman she wants for her son. Dafne seeks justice for Néstor and Gemma accepts Cuauhtémoc's proposal.
4	"El valor del sacrificio"	15 October 2020	12 November 2020	3.5	1.59
Ariadna, Eduardo and Tadeo move to Bárbara's house, but she is not happy at all. Gemma goes to live with Cuauhtémoc. Dafne overcomes her fears and confronts Silvestre, but he kicks her out.
5	"La culpa nos sigue siempre"	16 October 2020	13 November 2020	3.4	1.42
Bárbara remembers what she did in the past. Martha threatens Dafne. Olga asks Álvaro for a divorce. Cuauhtémoc tries to abuse Gemma. Eduardo decides to go live in the United States with his lover Linda.
6	"Necesidad de compañía"	19 October 2020	16 November 2020	3.0	1.65
Dafne arrives at the Falcón's house and introduces herself as Joaquín's daughter; Bárbara insults her and runs her off. Eduardo says goodbye to his family to go to the United States with Linda.
7	"Lo que te choca, te checa"	20 October 2020	17 November 2020	3.4	1.52
Dafne arrives with a lawyer to demand her inheritance rights and Bárbara could be sued for not accepting that she live in her house. Gemma suffers from being forced to be intimate with Cuauhtémoc. Ariadna is in danger.
8	"Lo único que nos queda es huir"	21 October 2020	18 November 2020	3.5	1.71
After suffering a kidnapping attempt, Ariadna despairs when she discovers that Eduardo canceled the purchase of her apartment. Bárbara and Dafne argue over the house. Álvaro discovers Olga's infidelity with Paulo. Levita complains to Cuauhtémoc for treating Gemma badly and asks him to set her free.
9	"¿Cuándo te conviertes en mujer?"	22 October 2020	20 November 2020	3.2	1.34
After quitting her job, Cuquita helps Gemma flee from Cuauhtémoc and finds her a job at Bárbara's house. Barbara pretends that she will sell her house to get Dafne out of there. Linda proposes to Eduardo to get married. Everyone discovers that the house is mortgaged.
10	"Prohibido tener planes y sueños"	23 October 2020	23 November 2020	3.2	1.66
Ariadna wants to go back to work, but Bárbara teases her. Eduardo returns to visit his family. Gemma asks Bárbara for permission to study in the afternoons and she accepts.
11	"Las sorpresas no siempre son agradables"	26 October 2020	24 November 2020	3.1	1.58
Dafne manages to escape from the trap of Mr. Calixto. Gemma investigates Dafne. Álvaro signs the divorce. Ariadna gets a job and Dafne finds new clues about Nestor's case. Bárbara sees Eduardo kissing Linda.
12	"El hijo consentido"	27 October 2020	25 November 2020	3.5	1.20
After Bárbara sees Eduardo kissing Linda, he asks her to keep the secret and finally ends up marrying her. Ariadna publishes a note against Olga's office. Olga warns Álvaro that she will close all opportunities for him. Gael confesses to Dafne his feelings.
13	"Tocando fondo"	28 October 2020	27 November 2020	2.9	1.33
Álvaro gets drunk from depression and promises to help his mother with the mortgage. Ariadna faces a terrible case. Bárbara stops Gemma from studying and sets a trap for Dafne.
14	"Es bonito tener amigas"	29 October 2020	30 November 2020	3.3	1.75
Martha and Eugenio try to take their grandchildren, but Dafne, Gemma, Ariadna and Bárbara team up to stop them. Gemma passes out at school.
15	"¿Debemos tener un hombre al lado?"	30 October 2020	1 December 2020	3.4	1.60
Barbara discovers that Calixto is an impostor. Ariadna takes Tadeo to work and he gets angry. Bárbara discovers that Álvaro and Olga got divorced and complains to him for hiding the truth from her. Gemma is pregnant.
16	"Las revanchas que nos regala la vida"	2 November 2020	2 December 2020	3.1	1.75
Álvaro reveals to Bárbara the reason why he divorced Olga. When Bárbara finds out that Olga was unfaithful to her son, she decides to go find Olga to confront her and slaps her. Dafne wants to baptize Santiago. Levita finds out that Gemma is pregnant.
17	"Controlar la vida de los que amamos"	3 November 2020	3 December 2020	3.2	TBA
Josefina puts Bárbara in her place. Santiago is finally baptized. Bárbara loses the money to pay the mortgage and blames Dafne for the theft. Linda asks Eduardo to introduce her to his family. Levita prepares a terrible surprise for Gemma.
18	"Cuando te toca, ni aunque te quites"	4 November 2020	4 December 2020	3.4	1.57
Gemma says goodbye to Bárbara and goes with Cuauhtémoc and his family. Álvaro tells Bárbara that Calixto attacked him. Eduardo tries to prevent Linda from meeting his family. Ariadna confronts Karen for deceiving her. Gael introduces Romina as his girlfriend.
19	"Los límites son necesarios"	5 November 2020	7 December 2020	3.4	1.70
Cuauhtémoc swears to Gemma that he won't hurt her. Ariadna fights with her boss while Bárbara takes care of Tadeo and cannot control him. Santiago falls ill again and Gael worries.
20	"Hay pocas certezas en la vida"	6 November 2020	8 December 2020	3.3	1.61
Bárbara fights with Dafne for giving English classes at her home. Eduardo fights at school for Tadeo. Gemma discovers that Cuauhtémoc is unfaithful to her and threatens him, but he ends up beating her. Dafne reveals a secret from Bárbara to all the Falcóns.
21	"¿Qué pasa cuando abandonas un sueño?"	9 November 2020	9 December 2020	3.0	1.76
Barbara complaints to Dafne for revealing her secret. Tadeo has a crisis at his festival. Eduardo does not arrive to Tadeo's festival and makes a decision that will affect his family. Levita blames Gemma for the mistreatment she suffers from Cuauhtémoc.
22	"Poner distancia"	10 November 2020	10 December 2020	3.3	1.53
Ariadna is depressed by Eduardo's abandonment. Bárbara talks to Eduardo to get him to reconsider. Álvaro with the help of Bárbara make Tadeo happy. Gael seeks to do a DNA test on Dafne to find out if they really are siblings. Dafne suffers from lack of money. Gemma decides to abort and Levita tries to save her from Cuauhtémoc.
23	"Todos hemos hecho algo que nos avergüenza"	11 November 2020	11 December 2020	3.7	1.62
Dafne discovers a secret from Josefina's past. Cuauhtémoc and Gemma go to the United States. Ariadna thanks Álvaro for all his support. Tadeo suffers abuse at school.
24	"¿Nuestro destino ya está escrito?"	12 November 2020	14 December 2020	3.5	1.80
Bárbara tells Eduardo about the damage he is causing to Tadeo by his absence. Gemma manages to escape from Cuauhtémoc and Ariadna will help her return to Mexico City. Bárbara flees from Calixto, but suffers a serious accident.
25	"Nunca se sabe a quién puedes necesitar"	13 November 2020	15 December 2020	3.6	1.95
Gael manages to get Dafne's DNA test results. Gemma and Levita explain everything to Ariadna. Bárbara suffers a serious accident and needs a transfusion, Levita donates blood to save her. Gemma wants to stay in Mexico City. Dafne confronts Josefina.
26	"Las cosas pasan por algo"	16 November 2020	16 December 2020	3.5	1.70
Bárbara discovers that Gemma is pregnant and is her niece. Gemma leaves her house. Gael receives the DNA results and tells Dafne that they are not siblings.
27	"Los hombres guardan demasiado silencio"	17 November 2020	17 December 2020	3.8	1.79
Alvaro confesses to Ariadna that he is infertile. Bárbara arrives at Levita's house to make amends and Gemma returns to the Falcóns' house. Gael declares his love to Dafne and she kisses him.
28	"La culpa que no nos deja en paz"	18 November 2020	18 December 2020	3.4	1.60
Dafne regrets kissing Gael. Bárbara fears that between Álvaro and Ariadna there is more than a friendship. Gemma goes back to school.
29	"Atrapada en una jaula sin llave"	19 November 2020	21 December 2020	3.5	1.73
Calixto calls Bárbara and agree to see each other to talk. Dafne senses that Gael is not Bárbara's son and confronts her, but Bárbara demands that she leave the house. Gael breaks up with Romina. Cuauhtémoc returns to San Ixplán.
30	"Las cosas pueden ponerse peor"	20 November 2020	22 December 2020	3.4	1.67
While Ariadna is threatened by Baldomero, Onofre sells Perlita to Cuauhtémoc. Gael tells Romina that they cannot continue their relationship, but she suspects that there is another woman. Dafne feels bad for Romina, but Gael tells her that he loves her and ends up kissing her. Bárbara will rent her garden to pay the mortgage.
31	"Consecuencias más graves"	23 November 2020	23 December 2020	3.5	1.46
Levita, with the help of the police, prevents Cuauhtémoc from taking Perlita away. Bárbara finds out that Ariadna will sue Eduardo for alimony.
32	"Prejuicios"	24 November 2020	28 December 2020	3.7	TBA
Bárbara mocks that Ariadna plans to sue Eduardo for alimony. Estefanía gives Bárbara a gift as a token of appreciation for allowing her to get married at her home, but she rejects it. Ariadna, Dafne and Gemma assure Bárbara that they are already fed up with her attitude and threaten to leave the house. Calixto manages to sneak in and Bárbara will try to stop him.
33	"Cómplices"	25 November 2020	29 December 2020	3.9	TBA
Calixto enters Bárbara's house, but she confronts him and he ends up seriously injured. Álvaro finds out what happened and asks his mother for an explanation. Bárbara is afraid of going to jail. Ariadna demands that Bárbara reveal what Calixto is looking for in the house. Álvaro is exonerated of the charges for the collapse of the building.
34	"El precio de la verdad puede ser muy alto"	26 November 2020	30 December 2020	3.6	TBA
Imelda arrives at Bárbara's house and tries to humiliate Gemma, but she responds in a smart way. Eduardo cries when he sees a video of his son Tadeo. Gael and Juanjo fight over Dafne. Álvaro and Olga eat together, but Paulo sets up a scene of jealousy. Bárbara, feeling afraid of what happened with Calixto, confesses Gael's secret to the other women.
35	"Algo tan poderoso como el amor"	27 November 2020	1 January 2021	3.4	1.61
Bárbara opens her heart and tells Ariadna, Gemma and Dafne the story of Gael. After watching Tadeo's video, Linda proposes to Eduardo that they be parents. Ariadna and Álvaro almost kiss. Romina finds out from Clarita that Dafne and Gael have kissed.
36	"¿El amor dura para siempre?"	30 November 2020	4 January 2021	3.4	1.97
Álvaro assures that if he confesses his love for Ariadna, he will have many problems with his mother and his brother Eduardo. Romina organizes a party in which she wants Dafne, Gael and Juanjo to attend. Dafne thinks that Juanjo just wants to annoy Gael, so she decides to leave the party. Gael, finds Dafne in the elevator and does not hesitate to confess his feelings by stealing a kiss from her. Gemma has a mishap at school.
37	"Hay cosas difíciles de esconder"	1 December 2020	5 January 2021	3.6	1.61
Ariadna and Álvaro talk and remain as friends. Dafne fears that Efi has recognized Gael and that she will the whole truth to Bárbara. Eduardo sends his son and his mother some gifts, but Ariadna gets upset. Dafne breaks up with Juanjo. Josefina attacks Bárbara when she learns that Gael is not Joaquín's son. Romina confesses to Bárbara that Dafne has a romantic relationship with Gael.
38	"¿Realmente queremos lo que tanto deseamos?"	2 December 2020	7 January 2021	3.6	TBA
Romina confronts Dafne for messing with Gael. Romina slaps Gael. Gemma fears for her baby's health. Gael and Dafne announce their relationship to the family; Bárbara does not accept the relationship.
39	"Señales de algo inesperado"	3 December 2020	8 January 2021	3.7	1.60
Bárbara decides to go find Lupe. Ariadna and Álvaro almost kiss. Gael wants to know who Rommel is. Olga makes a proposal to Álvaro.
40	"El impulso del amor"	4 December 2020	11 January 2021	3.4	1.60
Gael suspects that Bárbara is hiding something from him and decides to investigate who Rommel is. La Liendre takes Gael to the prison to meet Rommel. Álvaro and Ariadna can no longer stop what they feel and indulge in passion.
41	"La suerte es impredecible"	7 December 2020	12 January 2021	3.4	2.05
Rommel tells his brother that Lupe sold him. Gael complains to Bárbara for hiding that he had a twin. Bárbara and Lupe finally speak. Ariadna finds Álvaro with Olga. Bárbara learns that Calixto escaped from the hospital.
42	"¿El futuro es algo muy lejano?"	8 December 2020	13 January 2021	3.7	1.94
Bárbara is afraid to learn that Calixto escaped. Gael ends his relationship with Dafne. Bárbara asks Lupe to disappear from their lives. Rommel puts ideas to Gael against the Falcóns. Eduardo receives a summons for Ariadna's lawsuit. Bárbara is attacked by Calixto in the street.
43	"Todos vamos por la vida causando impresiones"	9 December 2020	14 January 2021	N/A	1.65
Bárbara confesses that Calixto tried to abuse her and testifies against him. Lino is Dafne's new student. Gael resigns from the agency.
44	"Las cosas nunca salen como las imaginabas"	10 December 2020	15 January 2021	3.7	1.59
Gemma attends a party with her classmates, but when she returns home she suffers a motorcycle accident and her life along with the baby's is in danger. Rommel asks Gael for a favor and Álvaro tries to make his brother reconsider.
45	"Perder el control"	11 December 2020	18 January 2021	3.2	1.84
Ariadna and Eduardo face off in the audience. Gael takes the money to Rommel and meets Lupe. Bárbara scolds Gemma for her carelessness. Álvaro rescues Gael and discovers the wad of money.
46	"Las señales delatan lo que somos"	14 December 2020	19 January 2021	3.5	1.84
Eduardo will have to pay alimony. Lupe fears that Rommel will take advantage of Gael. Bárbara believes that there is something more between Álvaro and Ariadna. Álvaro defends Ariadna from Eduardo and Tadeo suffers a crisis. Rommel asks Gael for a favor.
47	"Hacemos cosas sin pensar"	15 December 2020	21 January 2021	3.6	1.78
Bárbara rejects the idea of a romance between Álvaro and Ariadna. Ariadna is afraid that her relationship with Álvaro has no future. Gemma gets dizzy. Gael agrees to pose as Rommel, but he betrays him.
48	"No hay modo de escapar"	16 December 2020	22 January 2021	3.4	1.53
The judge dictates a formal prison order against Gael and must be transferred to the prison where Rommel is. Lupe visits Bárbara to tell her what happened with the twins.
49	"La maldad que siempre se esconde"	17 December 2020	25 January 2021	N/A	1.69
Bárbara apologizes to Gael and they reconcile. Ariadna discovers that Olga wants to get back together with Álvaro. Rommel has a plan to get out of prison.
50	"¿Estamos cegados por el amor?"	18 December 2020	26 January 2021	N/A	1.76
Rommel usurps Gael's life and gets out of prison; everyone is surprised with his behavior. Lupe discovers the usurpation and Dafne will be in danger. Gemma and Dimi are dating.
51	"Pagar por el mal que hicimos"	21 December 2020	27 January 2021	N/A	1.84
Rommel is betrayed by his accomplices. Gael tries to save Dafne, but when he is about to be shot, Rommel steps in and is mortally wounded. Lupe and Gael reconcile. Bárbara discovers that Calixto is following the orders of another man.
52	"La confianza se construye poco a poco"	22 December 2020	28 January 2021	N/A	1.78
Gael receives the affection of his friends. Ariadna gets jealous because of Olga. Eduardo is fed up with Linda. Álvaro rejects Olga's affection. Dafne tells Gael what happened to her husband.
53	"Obsesión"	23 December 2020	29 January 2021	3.1	1.54
Ariadna attacks Lino believing him to be a rapist. Olga catches Álvaro with Ariadna, so she stalks Ariadna's phone to find out the truth. Barbara tells Lino about Calixto.
54	"¿Todos tenemos ganas de tener hijos?"	25 December 2020	1 February 2021	2.7	1.88
Ariadna tells Álvaro that she doesn't plan to have a second child. Gael wants an end with Dafne. Olga tries to seduce Álvaro; he rejects her, but in the argument, she trips and her baby is in danger.
55	"Ariadna descubre que Álvaro tendrá un hijo"	28 December 2020	2 February 2021	3.2	1.64
Olga breaks the news to Álvaro that she is finally expecting his child and this could bring them back together and revive the love that existed between them, while Álvaro does not know how to break the news to Ariadna, while Olga does this for him.
56	"Álvaro termina con Ariadna"	29 December 2020	3 February 2021	3.3	1.57
Alvaro has made the decision to support the birth of his child; However, he is not willing to return with Olga to which she responds with the threat of not letting him see her child. Álvaro decides to break up with Ariadna.
57	"Lo más importante es la familia"	30 December 2020	4 February 2021	3.2	1.81
After Olga's threats towards Álvaro regarding his son, he decides to end his relationship with Ariadna and continue his life with Olga, in order to be close to his child when it is born. Gemma, after the fright of having lost Clarita, decides to face her fears and tell Dimi everything she feels for him but at the same time, that she is pregnant.
58	"Este bebé nos va a unir para toda la vida"	1 January 2021	5 February 2021	3.0	1.56
Álvaro agrees to return with Olga so that he can be close to his child. After Gemma decides to tell Dimi the whole truth, he rejects her and hurts her heart. Bárbara could give herself a second chance at love. Eduardo is increasingly fed up with his relationship with Linda.
59	"¿Una mentira se puede convertir en verdad?"	4 January 2021	8 February 2021	3.5	1.58
While Bárbara and Lino talk about love, Olga and Álvaro celebrate their reconciliation at the Falcón house; Ariadna suffers seeing them together.
60	"Punto de quiebre"	5 January 2021	9 February 2021	3.2	1.50
Bárbara hesitates to give Lino a chance, but they kiss. Gemma and Dimi kiss and she ends up giving him an opportunity. Olga intrigues against Tadeo. Gael explains to Clarita that now he will take care of her family.
61	"La fortuna viene disfrazada de desgracia"	6 January 2021	10 February 2021	3.5	1.71
Eduardo finds Memo and Linda in bed together; while trying to explain the situation, she has an accident. Bárbara proposes to Lino to go slowly in their relationship. Dimi defends Gemma at school.
62	"El poder de restaurar errores del pasado"	7 January 2021	11 February 2021	3.6	1.74
Eduardo says goodbye to Linda forever and returns to Mexico to win back Ariadna. Álvaro and Olga find out that they will be the parents of a girl. Dafne and Gael talk about the future.
63	"Nunca podremos huir de nosotros mismos"	8 January 2021	12 February 2021	3.6	1.63
Calixto is chased by the police. Tadeo is happy for Eduardo's return. Ariadna continues with the investigation of the rapist. Bárbara gathers her whole family to welcome Eduardo.
64	"Pleito genera más pleito"	11 January 2021	15 February 2021	3.5	1.76
Álvaro and Eduardo argue and almost hit each other. Dafne discovers that Gael plans to go to Miami and communication between them is not going well. Refugio will again suffer harassment.
65	"Nuestra verdadera naturaleza"	12 January 2021	16 February 2021	3.8	1.70
Gael confesses to Romina that he is not ready to be a father to Dafne's children and, on impulse, kisses her. Olga and Eduardo plan a weekend trip with the family. Dafne and Gael argue about their future. Gemma and Dimi long to be together. Tadeo sees Ariadna and Álvaro kissing.
66	"La hora de la verdad"	13 January 2021	17 February 2021	3.9	1.70
Ariadna tries to explain to Tadeo what happened. Álvaro breaks up with Olga. Dafne and Gemma are in danger. Eduardo insists on getting back together with Ariadna. Bárbara and Olga discover Álvaro and Ariadna in bed.
67	"La mujer de tu hermano"	14 January 2021	19 February 2021	3.8	1.65
Bárbara confronts Álvaro for sleeping with Ariadna and threatens to remove him from her life. Also, Bárbara kicks out Ariadna from the Falcón house. Ariadna reveals the truth to Eduardo.
68	"La mirada es el espejo del alma"	15 January 2021	22 February 2021	3.7	1.86
Eduardo makes fun of Bárbara's relationship with Lino. Ariadna tells Álvaro that she had never loved someone as much as him. Eduardo prepares a surprise for Ariadna. Olga assures Álvaro that she will go to live in Spain.
69	"¿Para qué sirven las palabras?"	18 January 2021	23 February 2021	3.7	1.66
Eduardo tries to put ideas to Tadeo against Ariadna. Dimi defends Gemma at school. Olga wants to destroy Álvaro. Dafne continues to not understand Gael.
70	"Lenguaje oculto"	19 January 2021	24 February 2021	3.8	1.72
Ariadna stops Olga. Eduardo finds an anonymous note against Ariadna and prohibits her from taking Tadeo. Bárbara discovers that the jewel that Lino gave her does not have any value.
71	"El cambio es ahora o nunca"	20 January 2021	25 February 2021	3.6	1.76
Olga is rushed to the hospital, where the doctor gives her terrible news. Eduardo informs Ariadna that he will enforce his rights with his son.
72	"Nadie sabe lo que tiene hasta que lo ve perdido"	21 January 2021	26 February 2021	4.0	1.67
Olga suffers when she knows the fate of her baby and decides to change her attitude, she looks for Ariadna to apologize for her behavior and to tell her that she hopes she will be happy with Álvaro.
73	"Hay personas que saben cómo manipularnos"	22 January 2021	1 March 2021	3.5	1.72
While Álvaro desperately searches for Olga, Bárbara blames Ariadna for what happened to her son's baby and demands that stop the investigation.
74	"Salirse con la suya"	25 January 2021	2 March 2021	3.6	1.69
Lino attacks Cassandra. Gael throws Nestor's ashes and fights Dafne because of the memory of Nestor. Everyone is still concerned about Olga's disappearance.
75	"Enemigos"	26 January 2021	3 March 2021	3.5	1.75
Álvaro receives the news that Olga was murdered. Lino publishes an article against Ariadna. Paulo blames Álvaro for Olga's death.
76	"Ponernos a prueba"	27 January 2021	4 March 2021	3.7	1.65
Gemma and Dimi are ready for their first time, but because of his comments, Gemma decides to do nothing. Ariadna and Bárbara find the cellar empty. Ariadna reveals to Bárbara that Calixto has a cousin. Gael breaks up with Dafne. Álvaro discovers who Olga left her properties to.
77	"Ser víctima del desamor"	28 January 2021	5 March 2021	3.7	1.68
Álvaro is a suspect in Olga's death. Bárbara defends Gemma from Dimi's mother. Eduardo gives Ariadna the petition for divorce. Gemma grieves for the baby's early arrival. Lino proposes to Bárbara.
78	"La próxima víctima"	29 January 2021	8 March 2021	3.5	1.79
Ariadna and Cassandra suspect that Eliseo is stalking them. Eduardo sues Ariadna to fight for custody of Tadeo. Gael manages to get hired in Miami. Álvaro finds evidence that frees him from Olga's crime.
79	"Negarse a ver la realidad"	1 February 2021	9 March 2021	3.3	1.84
Ariadna confronts Lino for being a racist; Barbara defends him, but doubts arise. Dafne decides to go to Monterrey. Linda is in tax trouble because of Eduardo.
80	"Un camino sin salida"	2 February 2021	10 March 2021	3.2	1.85
Azucena tells the whole truth to Ariadna. Hilda attacks Gemma at school. Álvaro and Paulo join forces to find Olga's murderer. Ariadna discovers that Lino has lied about his job and confronts him.
81	"Pequeños incendios"	3 February 2021	12 March 2021	3.4	1.80
Eduardo asks Ariadna for a new opportunity. Álvaro is annoyed by Lino's attitudes. Dimi wants nothing to do with Gemma. Lino burns the Falcón office.
82	"Declarar la guerra"	4 February 2021	15 March 2021	3.4	1.72
Bárbara and Lino make love. Eduardo tries to force Ariadna to get back together with him, Gemma and Dafne defend her. Bárbara announces that she and Lino will live together. Álvaro begins to investigate Lino. Eduardo threatens Ariadna with taking Tadeo from her, but she informs him that she has countersued him.
83	"Romper el silencio"	5 February 2021	16 March 2021	3.5	1.93
Ariadna and Tadeo leave the Falcón house. Dafne confronts Bárbara for refusing to sell her share. Álvaro questions Lino about the day Olga died. Gael wants to fight for Dafne's love.
84	"Más dudas que respuestas"	8 February 2021	17 March 2021	3.5	1.84
Dafne discovers that Gael could have driven the car that killed Nestor. Eduardo and Ariadna face each other in court and Álvaro confronts Eduardo for assaulting Ariadna, but when Eduardo assures him that she deserved it, Álvaro decides to put him in his place.
85	"Medidas drásticas"	9 February 2021	18 March 2021	3.5	1.83
Ariadna tells Álvaro that the best thing will be to end their relationship. Dafne is devastated to learn that Gael caused Nestor's death. Gemma starts a new job. Linda vows revenge on Eduardo. Ariadna and Eduardo lose temporary custody of Tadeo.
86	"Todo en esta vida está unido por algo"	10 February 2021	19 March 2021	3.5	1.70
Ariadna tells Tadeo the judge's decision. Lino discovers that Gemma is no longer going to school. Gael confronts Juanjo for telling Dafne that he was to blame for Néstor's death. Gemma has an accident.
87	"Una verdad aterradora"	11 February 2021	22 March 2021	3.5	1.92
Gemma gives birth to a girl. Ariadna agrees to go back to Eduardo for the good of Tadeo. Dimi discovers that he will not be able to walk again. Álvaro discovers Olga's murderer.
88	"El final de alguien que se nos adelantó"	12 February 2021	23 March 2021	3.9	1.90
Lino will not allow Álvaro to end his plans, so he kidnaps him and tells him the reasons why he had to kill Olga. Dafne finally discovers who killed Nestor and confronts Silvestre again.
89	"Corazón de piedra"	15 February 2021	24 March 2021	3.6	2.05
Linda tells Ariadna everything Eduardo did to her. Ariadna confronts Bárbara for hiding Eduardo and Linda's marriage. Commander Montaño notifies the Falcón family that they found Álvaro's car with his charred body.
90	"El dolor más profundo"	16 February 2021	25 March 2021	3.4	1.95
Bárbara is devastated by Álvaro's death, not knowing that her son is alive. Azucena confirms to Ariadna that Lino is the serial rapist. Ariadna asks Bárbara to watch out for Lino. Gael gives Ariadna the chip that could end Lino.
91	"Arriesgarlo todo"	17 February 2021	26 March 2021	3.6	1.80
Lino uses Álvaro to catch Ariadna, but they both manage to escape from Lino. Bárbara apologizes to everyone for how selfish she was. Eduardo asks his mother for help to escape.
92	"Las mujeres luchamos unidas"	18 February 2021	29 March 2021	3.8	1.90
Eduardo is arrested in front of Tadeo and Bárbara suffers for her son. Lino threatens the four Falcón women and decides to take them by force, but Dafne gathers up her courage and ends up stabbing him in self-defense.
93	"Las mujeres unidas vencen todo"	19 February 2021	30 March 2021	4.0	2.06
Gemma arrives at the hospital to see her baby, but the doctor tells her that the baby died. Lino did not die after being stabbed by Dafne, the judge sentences him to 120 years in prison for all the crimes he committed. Dafne finally decides to say goodbye to Nestor and together with her two children, she scatters his ashes in the field. Dafne and Gael get back together. Álvaro asks Ariadna to marry him. Cassandra and Ariadna receive an award for their impeccable work and research. Ariadna reveals to Álvaro that she is pregnant. Bárbara decides to take a trip alone to Paris. The four Falcón women achieve a sisterhood and find peace and stability thanks to the love of the people around them.

=== Specials ===
Title	Original release date
"Nochebuena con los Falcón"	24 December 2020
The Falcón family remember what they have experienced and celebrate Christmas together.
"Cena de fin de año con el elenco de Vencer el Desamor"	31 December 2020
The main cast have a New Year's Eve dinner together, where they remember what it was like to film the telenovela in the middle of the COVID-19 pandemic.
