= Vencer la ausencia =

Mexican telenovela

- Genre: Telenovela
- Created by: Pedro Armando Rodríguez; Gerardo Pérez Zermeño
- Written by: Alejandra Romero; Humberto Robles; Luis Gamboa Gangoiti; Daniela Ochoa
- Directed by: Fernando Nesme; Benjamín Cann
- Starring: Ariadne Díaz; Mayrín Villanueva; David Zepeda; Danilo Carrera; Alejandra Barros; Alexis Ayala; Jesús Ochoa; Mariana Garza; María Perroni Garza
- Theme music composer: Marcela Garza; Cecy Leos; Paulina Goto
- Opening theme: "Te voy a extrañar" by Paulina Goto
- Composer: Alejandro Abaroa
- Country of origin: Mexico
- Original language: Spanish
- No. of seasons: 1
- No. of episodes: 80

Production
- Executive producer: Rosy Ocampo
- Producers: Raúl Estrada; Daniel Estrada
- Editors: Mauricio Coronel Cortez; Rodrigo Morales
- Production company: TelevisaUnivision

Original release
- Network: Las Estrellas
- Release: 18 July – 4 November 2022

Related
- Vencer franchise

Vencer la ausencia (English: Overcoming Loss) is a Mexican telenovela that aired on Las Estrellas from 18 July 2022 to 4 November 2022. The series is produced by Rosy Ocampo and is the fourth production of the "Vencer" franchise. It stars Ariadne Díaz, Mayrín Villanueva, Alejandra Barros, and María Perroni Garza.

== Plot ==
The sisterhood of four women of different origins is shattered when an accident causes them all to lose a loved one. After discovering the causes of the accident, they will share a painful mystery. The four women must overcome the absence of their loved ones and resolve the grief to rebuild their lives, regaining the sisterhood that united them.

== Cast ==
- Ariadne Díaz as Julia Miranda
- Mayrín Villanueva as Esther Noriega
- David Zepeda as Jerónimo Garrido
- Danilo Carrera as Ángel Funes
- Alejandra Barros as Celeste Machado
- Alexis Ayala as Braulio Dueñas
- Jesús Ochoa as Rodolfo Miranda
- Mariana Garza as Margarita Rojo
- María Perroni Garza as Rayo Rojo
- Nailea Norvind as Flavia Vilchis
- Laura Carmine as Lenar Ramírez
- Mariluz Bermúdez as Ana Sofi Ordax
- David Ostrosky as Homero Funes (episodes 1–65)
- Silvia Mariscal as Claudia Luna
- Laura Luz as Chepina Chávez
- Felipe Najera as Máximo Camargo
- Eugenio Montessoro as Santino
- Agustín Arana as Donato Gil
- Marcos Montero as Misael Valdéz
- Fernanda Urdapilleta as Gina Miranda
- Adriana Llabrés as Mirna Funes
- Miguel Martínez as Erik
- Andrés Vázquez as Iván Camargo
  - Ándre Sebastián as Child Iván
- Federico Porras as Adair
- Daney Mendoza as Ebenezer
- Nicole Reyes as Matilde
- Luca Valentini as Teo
- Mariano Soria as Daniel
- Rodrigo Murray as Homero Funes (episodes 70–80)

=== Recurring ===
- José Remis as Sammy
- Arath Aquino as El Robin

=== Guest stars ===
- Angelique Boyer as Renata Sánchez Vidal
- Paulina Goto as Marcela Dúran

== Production ==
The telenovela was announced on 1 November 2021. Production began in April 2022.

== Ratings ==
Viewership and ratings per season of Vencer la ausencia
Season	Timeslot (CT)	Episodes	First aired		Last aired		Avg. viewers (millions)
Season	Timeslot (CT)	Episodes	Date	Viewers (millions)	Date	Viewers (millions)	Avg. viewers (millions)
1	Mon–Fri 8:30 p.m.	80	18 July 2022	3.3	4 November 2022	3.6	3.05

== Episodes ==
No.	Title	Original release date	Mexico viewers (millions)
1	"La vida te pone a prueba"	18 July 2022 (Note: Premiered early online through Las Estrellas website on 15 July 2022.)	3.3
Margarita gets the truck for the business she plans to have with her friends. Flavia complains to Esther for asking Máximo for money for Iván's studies. Jerónimo talks to Lenar to tell her that he got his U.S. residency and plans to return to Mexico. Ángel wants to start a business on his own and without anyone's help, but Ana Sofi asks him to reconsider because she wants a family by his side. Misael is fed up with living at his father-in-law's house and complains to Julia for investing in a business with her friends. Margarita's relationship with her daughter is not going well, but can't solve anything because she goes out to get the truck for the business. Misael confesses to Julia that his plans were not to have a family and she says that the best thing to do is separate. Jerónimo travels to Mexico and finds a wrecked truck. Esther receives a call from Jerónimo to inform her of the truck accident.
2	"Dar el último adiós"	19 July 2022	3.4
Julia regrets what she said to Misael, tries to apologize, but takes off in his car. Jerónimo gets out of the truck in which he was traveling and tries to help the people in the accident. Máximo informs Esther and Julia that Margarita lost her life in the accident. Ángel and Mirna are worried about their father's health. Jerónimo returns home to Mexico and gets to see his family after 15 years separated from them, but discovers that his family avoids all contact with him. Esther is confident that her son is still alive despite the serious accident he suffered on the road. Flavia arrives at Celeste's house and reveals to Rayo that her mother died. At the news of Margarita's death, Rayo feels guilty for having argued with her mother before the trip she took. Esther, Máximo and Julia arrive at the scene of the tragedy.
3	"Aceptar un hecho"	20 July 2022	3.0
Julia holds out hope of seeing her husband again, despite the accident. Ángel and Braulio arrive with the police to find out if they know Misael's whereabouts. Rayo regrets not telling her mother how much he loved her and Celeste tries to control her. Ángel is threatened by his father's moneylender with losing 70% of the company. Jerónimo is about to move into his house, but is unaware of his family's behavior and is later confronted with his wife's rejection. Máximo returns to Esther's house and informs her that Ivan lost his life in the accident. Julia receives a visit from Ángel and informs him that Misael may have escaped with a large sum of money.
4	"Callar las cosas"	21 July 2022	3.2
Julia argues with Ángel for calling Misael a thief. Mirna confesses to Angel that his father may have trusted Misael because of the estrangement between them and his father. Esther still does not assimilate her son's departure and imagines him all over the place. Esther receives a visit from her mother, but their relationship is not the best. Faced with her son's constant questions, Julia feels desperate for no news about Misael. Esther arrives at the funeral home to say goodbye to Iván. Ángel looks for his father to find out why he trusted Misael so much in a business with so much money involved. Cuca confesses to Rayo that Flavia paid her mother's expenses. Esther, Celeste and Julia look for Flavia after learning that she paid Margarita's funeral expenses and are willing to return her money, but are surprised to learn that Margarita asked Flavia for a loan.
5	"Un secreto que es mejor llevarnos a la tumba"	22 July 2022	2.7
Surprised by the closeness between Flavia and Margarita, Esther, Celeste and Julia argue about all the differences between them. Jerónimo explodes against his family and makes them see that it is thanks to him that they got ahead. Cuca is not willing to take care of Rayo. Ángel receives the news that no bank is willing to grant credit to his father's company. Julia arrives in Matehuala to learn more about her husband's disappearance, but is surprised to learn that he is a fugitive from the police. Lenar refuses to spend an intimate moment with Jerónimo and reveals that she already has another partner. Rayo returns home and discovers that her aunt Cuca abandoned her.
6	"Resentir las pérdidas"	25 July 2022	3.1
Jerónimo reacts to Lenar's confession about her new relationship and prefers to stay away from his family. Braulio does not want Celeste to be worried about Rayo and prevents them from getting closer. Esther confesses to her mom that she no longer has a job. Celeste tells Braulio about the money they owe Flavia. Rayo is willing to go back to school to fulfill the promise she made to her mother about becoming a great writer. Celeste complains to Julia because Braulio is in trouble because of Misael. Rayo discovers that she might be sent to a group home. Esther receives a call from Iván's university to announce that the refund Máximo requested is in process. Jerónimo looks for Lenar to try to win her back and get his family, but she opposes. Julia wants to clarify Misael's situation with Braulio, but Ángel ends up confessing to Julia that her husband will be denounced for theft. Flavia reveals to Esther that Máximo not only wants Iván's college refund, he also wants the house where she and her son used to live.
7	"No esperar nada de nadie"	26 July 2022	2.9
Esther wants to talk to Máximo to find out why he wants to kick her out of the apartment. Julia promises Ángel that she will find Misael to prove that he did not steal the money from Funes. Jerónimo manages to get in touch with Esther and wants to see her to return Iván's badge. Homero is diagnosed with an absence crisis. Flavia tries to persuade Máximo to take his house from Esther. After meeting with Jerónimo, Esther shares with him everything that is going on and they both come clean in conversation. Celeste tries to convince Braulio to let Rayo stay at her house for a few days but Braulio does not want Celeste to be worried about her. Esther visits the mayor's office and receives details about the death of her son and everything indicates that Misael is the culprit. Jerónimo returns home to ask for a new chance for his family, but discovers Donato at home.
8	"Algo que nos convierte en cómplices"	27 July 2022	3.2
Jerónimo argues with his family for lying to him about Lenar's partner and decides to stay at home, despite everyone's annoyance. Braulio finds Celeste lying in the doorway of the building and after taking her to the hospital they receive the news of her pregnancy. Braulio finds Rayo and asks her to stay away from Celeste. Esther insists on finding Misael and making him pay for what happened to her son. Adair admits to his father that he has no love for him. Jerónimo seeks out Lenar to tell her that he is leaving the house, but informs her that he will not be able to support them as before. Esther pays part of her debt to Flavia and warns that she does not plan to leave the apartment. Julia and Ángel meet at the Funes company and try to find a solution about Misael. Jerónimo needs advice and turns to Esther for support. Rayo is surprised to see that the audio she sent to her mother was listened to.
9	"Traicionar las promesas que hicimos"	28 July 2022	3.0
Julia and Ángel join forces to look for Misael. Celeste tells Flavia about the missing money that Misael allegedly took. Jerónimo supports Esther in finding out about Misael and the accident in which his son died. Lenar tells her sons that Jerónimo is only willing to pay what is necessary for their studies. Julia gives her word to Ángel to inform him anything about Misael. Jerónimo needs to stay a few days at Lenar's house because he still can't find a place to stay, but Adair and Ebenezer object. Flavia finds Julia in the corridors of the unit and collects from her what she owes her for the truck with interest included. Flavia tells Esther that Misael escaped with a large amount of money. Esther does not stand idly by and publishes on social media that Misael is on the run after the accident in which her son died. Tadeo already knows that Rayo lives alone and without her aunt Cuca. Celeste receives her test results and is diagnosed with a serious illness.
10	"Pensar como macho"	29 July 2022	2.8
Julia calls Ángel to tell him that she has possible clues about Misael. Celeste asks her doctor not to tell Braulio about her illness. Tadeo visits Rayo and discovers the life she has now with no one to take care of her. Máximo calls Esther to assure her that he will never take her out of the apartment where she lives. Julia and Ángel search for the address where Misael is probably staying, but are surprised by a group of men. Ángel finds a bloody gauze. Celeste confesses to Flavia that she has multiple sclerosis and only causes her stress to increase. Jerónimo is looking for a new job because he is worried about his son's tuition. Julia and Ángel go to the public prosecutor's office to report to the authorities what happened with Misael, but they are unsuccessful. Celeste tells Braulio that she has multiple sclerosis. Julia looks for Esther to complain about what she posted on social media and Esther assures her that she has proof to prove what she says.
11	"Aceptar una verdad"	1 August 2022	2.9
Esther confesses to Julia that Misael cheated on her with other women. After hearing the doctor's news, Braulio asks Celeste to terminate the pregnancy. Jerónimo waits for Ebenezer outside the school, but is unsuccessful in bonding with his son. Celeste is opposed to terminating her pregnancy. Julia is still wondering if Misael was unfaithful. Homero does not want to turn his company into a cooperative. Julia receives the news that Misael was living with another woman and is willing to look for her to find out if she knows anything about her husband. Máximo signs a power of attorney for Flavia. Julia looks for Viviana and is surprised to see a man running.
12	"No vemos lo que nos afecta"	2 August 2022	2.9
Julia discovers that Misael is not at Viviana's side, she was just one of the women he had. Ebenezer makes Jerónimo understand that his absence will not be fixed with anything. Celeste informs Braulio that she has decided not to terminate her pregnancy, but this sparks an argument between the two. Rayo denies to her friends in the housing unit that her mother is dead. Esther seeks out Jerónimo once again to ask for his help in finding Misael. Ángel is willing to mortgage his father's house to keep his company from going bankrupt. Julia confesses to her father that Misael cheated on her with other women. Rayo is discovered for receiving money in exchange for doing other people’s homework and this infuriates her and lashes out against her classmates.
13	"Todos mentimos"	3 August 2022	3.0
Jerónimo tries to get Lenar to react because his son disappears from the house. Esther regrets reacting impulsively to Julia and hurting Dani with her comments. After Esther's comments, Dani questions his mom about his father's location. Celeste is unaware of Braulio's indifferent attitude. Flavia calls Iván's university to request more reimbursement. Flavia asks Celeste to get as close as she can to Braulio because of the complicated nature of her illness. Rayo can no longer hide her mother's death and tells the whole truth. Gina insists on becoming a famous influencer, but for this she starts as the image of a sausage brand. Jerónimo learns that his son Adair never enrolled in school. Julia tries to defend a street vendor from policemen, but only provokes her arrest. Jerónimo confronts his son and Adair replies that he will drop out of school to live in the United States. Flavia threatens to kick Esther out of the apartment. Esther calls the university and confirms that Iván never visited the exchange school facilities.
14	"Buscar dónde pertenecer"	4 August 2022	3.0
Julia is arrested by the police and asks Ángel for help. Rayo is convinced by her friend Mati to keep quiet about her situation. Ángel goes to the public ministry to pay Julia's fine. Esther continues to investigate the reason why Iván did not go to the university as an exchange student. Ángel tells Ana Sofi that he received an invitation from Julia and her family to have lunch with them. Rayo and Mati arrive at the school girls' party and become the popular ones. Ángel feels uncomfortable with the places that Ana Sofi frequents and the people who are in this place. Ángel reaches an agreement with Ana Sofi's father to avoid problems with the company's workers. Celeste finds Braulio is tidying up her son's room. Flavia arrives at Esther's house with a lawyer to ask her to leave the apartment.
15	"Siempre hay algo en lo que la regamos"	5 August 2022	2.9
Esther refuses to leave the house she lives in only because Flavia says so. Ángel signs his father-in-law's documents to receive the loan that could save his company. Jerónimo asks Donato not to tell him how to raise his children. Máximo visits his son Iván's room and admits that he walked away from him when he needed him the most. Máximo argues with Flavia because he does not plan to kick Esther out of the apartment and he admits that he moved away from Iván because of her.
16	"La culpa llega de golpe"	8 August 2022	3.2
Flavia arrives at Margarita's house to find out if Cuca is inside and Rayo's secret is in danger. Ana Sofi prepares her proposal with Ángel. Adair assures his mother that Donato is his father figure and not Jerónimo. After Teo's news about the possibility of renting the apartment where she lives, Rayo fears that she will be left with nothing. Máximo seeks out Esther to tell her that he will try to help her with her problems and asks her for the apartment where she lives, but she objects. Jerónimo apologizes to Ebenezer for the attitude he had when he arrived in Laredo. Claudia seeks out Flavia to assure her that she can get Esther out of the apartment as long as there is no longer any debt owed.
17	"La confianza es un cristal frágil"	9 August 2022	3.0
When Ebenezer asks his mother if she will let Donato live in the house now that his father is leaving, Jerónimo is furious and assures her that the best thing to do is to sell the property. Claudia deceives her daughter and informs Esther that there is a possibility of working remotely, but she will have to do an interview in Guadalajara. Teo tells Rayo that the owner of the apartment will make a visit. Braulio refuses to receive help from a specialist for Celeste. Daniel remains hidden in Ángel's car until he arrives in Querétaro where he is discovered. Flavia, Celeste and Esther enter Margarita's house and realize what a mess it is. Esther cannot believe that her friends made her sign a document based on lies. Julia and Ángel continue the search for Misael in Queretaro. Esther learns that her mother is behind Flavia's proposal to forgive her the debt in exchange for the apartment and asks her to leave the house.
18	"Las consecuencias pueden ser más malas que buenas"	10 August 2022	3.0
Ángel explains to Ana Sofi what happened with Daniel, which is why he couldn't make it to the event. Jerónimo warns Adair that he will force him to study high school. Ana Sofi fails to understand why Ángel is still looking for the money that his company lost to Misael. Flavia warns Esther that she will do everything to get her out of the apartment. Jerónimo is willing to go back to school with his son Adair. Esther finds Julia in the street and learns that she has Misael's phone. When Julia refuses to hand it over to the authorities, Esther threatens to report her. Julia manages to unlock Misael's phone, but has no clue about her husband. Gina confesses to Julia that she is to blame for the problem between Ángel and his girlfriend. Ana Sofi arrives at Ángel's office and finds out that Julia is there, this unleashes an argument.
19	"¿Qué hace que un hombre se enamore?"	11 August 2022	3.0
Ángel tries to apologize to Ana Sofi, but she is angry that he switched her for Julia. Esther explains to Jerónimo her situation with Flavia and proposes to live together. Rayo reveals to Celeste that her aunt Cuca left her alone. Esther talks to Jerónimo about her past with Flavia and he agrees to live with her. Ángel begins to doubt his feelings for Ana Sofi, but refuses to break off their engagement. Esther and Julia manage to make peace. Celeste takes care of Rayo and offers her house as a new home. Braulio finds Rayo at his house and Celeste explains to him that she will live with them, but he objects at first. Donato asks Jerónimo if he still loves Lenar and proposes to buy his part of the house. Julia says goodbye to Ángel because she does not want to cause him any more problems with his girlfriend. Esther visits Máximo to announce that she is about to move out of the apartment and he believes that Flavia is behind everything. Ángel admits to having feelings for Julia, but it is too late because Ana Sofi arrives at his apartment to live together.
20	"Reacomodar las prioridades"	12 August 2022	3.1
Ana Sofi arrives at Ángel's house to live together. Mati complains to Rayo for giving in to Celeste's plans. Donato questions Lenar about whether she plans to continue living with Jerónimo. Ariel meets Flavia because she wants to rent Esther's apartment. Celeste objects to Rayo missing a year of school. Julia manages to convince Ariel that she is the right person to help him. Ángel discovers that his house has completely changed. Braulio cannot empathize with Rayo and thinks she is hiding something. Jerónimo opposes selling his house to Donato and this forces Lenar to leave the house with her sons. Esther's plans could fall apart because Flavia wants to rent the apartment to someone other than Jerónimo. Esther and Julia visit Celeste after learning that Rayo is living with her. After a discussion between the three of them, Rayo overhears the conversation and confesses that the messages to her mother are marked as read.
21	"¿Qué tanto sabemos de nuestros hijos?"	15 August 2022	2.8
Esther and Celeste believe that Misael may have stolen Margarita's phone and they throw this in Julia's face. After the fight between the friends, they are questioned by Rayo about their friendship. Jerónimo manages to convince Flavia to sign the rental contract for Esther's apartment. Celeste talks to Braulio about the problem she had with her friends and he asks her to stay away from them. Rayo makes Celeste see that Braulio is controlling her. Jerónimo tells his family that Donato bought his part of the house, but it will remain in Ebenezer and Adair's name. After this, Jerónimo ends his relationship with Lenar by signing their divorce. Braulio asks Esther to stop bothering Celeste because it affects her pregnancy. Julia receives the DNA test of the gauze she found and is informed that it is not related to Misael. Meanwhile, Ángel searches the car that Misael was driving when he traveled to Laredo and finds a surprise.
22	"¿Qué es exactamente madurar?"	16 August 2022	3.1
While Julia is worried about the DNA results of the gauze she found, Ángel finds a backpack in the last vehicle driven by Misael. Braulio discovers a suspicious conversation between Esther and Ángel's secretary. Mati convinces Rayo to run away for a few hours to raise money for her birthday. Flavia arrives at Esther's house and introduces her to Jerónimo, but they pretend not to know each other to avoid problems. Braulio reprimands Rayo for disappearing and not giving notice. Ángel rejects Silvano as the new partner of the Funes company and argues with Ana Sofi because of Silvano's pressure. Esther finds Iván's backpack in Ángel's office. Julia receives a message on social media announcing that Misael is alive.
23	"¿Todo es para siempre?"	17 August 2022	3.1
Celeste has vision problems again after arguing with Rayo. Despite the estrangement with his children, Jerónimo makes up for lost time with Ebenezer. Esther confesses to Ángel that the backpack in his office belongs to Iván, her son. Jerónimo arrives at Esther's apartment to arrange how they will make it look like she left her house. Homero faces a crisis of absence while staying home alone. Flavia discovers Jerónimo at Esther's house, but suspects nothing of their plans. After Homer's crisis, Ángel arrives home in the company of Julia and she ends up winning Mr. Funes' heart. Julia asks Esther to stop blaming Misael as the culprit of the food truck accident. Homero's doctor recommends him to have more tests because he fears that his problems are due to senile dementia. Celeste proposes to Braulio that they adopt Rayo. Esther, Celeste and Julia learn about Flavia's new business.
24	"¿De qué somos capaces por nuestros hijos?"	18 August 2022	2.9
Esther and Julia complain to Flavia for setting up a business with their idea. Máximo arrives at Jerónimo's apartment to introduce himself, but is surprised to find Esther there. Celeste tells Rayo that she wants to adopt her, but everything depends on Braulio's decision. Ángel gets upset with Ana Sofi for her comments about his father and receives terrible news about his health. Ángel runs out of time to pay the money to the man who lent it to his father. Julia suffers from seeing Dani in a bad mood because of Misael's absence, but he assures her that his behavior is because his father does not love him, since he has seen him around. Jerónimo is fired from the school where he works for assaulting a teacher.
25	"Resolver broncas que no son nuestras"	19 August 2022	3.0
Zacary arrives to collect from Ángel and Braulio the debt Homero owes him, but since there is no money, he threatens to take part of the fleet. Esther wants to know if there are any clues about Misael and when she asks Braulio, he humiliates her and asks her to focus on her job. Julia talks to her father about the mistake he made in hiding the report that Dani had at school. Celeste admits that she doesn't dress the way she wants to because of Braulio's advice. Esther is assaulted and Iván's tablet is taken from her. Rayo fulfills the challenge imposed by Mati and steals a kiss from Teo, but they are surprised by Flavia. Teo confesses to Flavia that he has always helped Rayo since Margarita's death. Celeste talks to Braulio and reminds him about adopting Rayo, but he objects. Flavia suspects that Jerónimo is subletting the apartment to Esther and when they are discovered, Jerónimo confesses to her that they are a couple.
26	"El amargo veneno de la envidia"	22 August 2022	3.0
Flavia tries to question Jerónimo and Esther about their relationship. Ana Sofi assures her dad that Ángel might agree to ally himself with the family. Homero suffers a crisis at the doctor's office and forgets things. Flavia finds Julia at Ariel's house and exposes her for the money she owes her. Mati invites her friends to spend the afternoon at Braulio's house, but Rayo is unaware of this. Jerónimo tries to clarify with Flavia what happened with Esther, but she offers him a job. Braulio tells Esther and Julia that Celeste does not want to see them. Rayo is surprised by Braulio's attitude. Flavia insists on knowing what Máximo was doing talking to Esther and this causes an argument in which he asks her to separate for a while.
27	"Un hecho dice más que mil palabras"	23 August 2022	3.0
Flavia tells Teo what happened with his father. Silvano does not plan to join the Funes company if Ángel does not marry Ana Sofi. Dani feels betrayed by his mother and Ángel because they still can't find his father. Lenar and her sons arrive at Jerónimo's apartment, but they get a surprise when they meet Esther and are introduced by Jerónimo as his new partner and Esther feels uncomfortable. Julia seeks out Flavia to ask for a deadline to pay the debt she owes, but she only agrees to two more days or she could sue her. Julia, Esther and the rest of the neighbors in the unit organize a Quinceañera party for Rayo. Julia surprises Rayo by giving her the last gift Margarita left her.
28	"Tarde o temprano pagamos un precio"	24 August 2022	3.0
Julia explains to Ángel that Dani is disappointed in him for not continuing to look for Misael. Mati calls Rayo to let her know that she is wanted by Family Services. Teo reveals to everyone that Rayo ran away because of Family Services' appearance in the unit. Family Services finds Rayo, but she is defended by Julia, Esther and the rest of the neighbors. Teo assures his dad that his mother reported Rayo to Family Services. Esther prefers not to have any contact with her mother, but Jerónimo asks her to reconsider. Julia once again seeks out Sin Filtros to tell her about Misael's whereabouts. Celeste wants to confront Flavia for having called Family Services to take Rayo, but Braulio stops her and reveals that he made the call.
29	"Un ambiente tóxico"	25 August 2022	3.1
Celeste reproaches Braulio for having reported Rayo and he responds by assuring her that it is the best thing for both of them. Esther and Julia realize what happened with Flavia's truck and she threatens to report them. Esther arrives with the hacker who unblocked her son's social media accounts, but is surprised to see Iván and Margarita's relationship. Homero arrives at the Funes company and surprises his so, he feels guilty that Ángel is going to ruin his life by joining his life with Ana Sofi. Celeste is reunited with her brother Óscar. Julia receives a package from an unknown man and in it finds a wad of cash, she gives Ángel the money she received from Misael. Ángel confesses his feelings to Julia.
30	"¿Las cosas suceden por casualidad?"	26 August 2022	2.8
Ángel confesses his love to Julia, but she asks him to forget everything because he is about to get married. Celeste is reunited with her brother, but they are surprised by Braulio who prevents them from talking. Esther looks for Flavia to ask her for Margarita's things and try to find clues about the relationship between her son and her friend. Teo meets Rayo and confesses that he likes Matilde. After what Oscar told her, Celeste avoids Braulio at all costs, Braulio threatens her with reporting Rayo to Family Services again if she stays at his house. Celeste confesses to Rayo that Braulio reported her to Family Services and does not want to see her in the house anymore. Ángel tells Ana Sofi that he does not want to marry her because he does not love her.
31	"Algo que nadie imaginaba"	29 August 2022	3.0
Ana Sofi slaps Ángel, the argument extends to the street and Gina records them. Rayo says goodbye to Celeste and makes her see how toxic her relationship with Braulio is. Ángel receives a visit from Silvano to sign the partnership with his company, but he rejects the idea because he does not want to deal with anything related to Ana Sofi. Esther tells Jerónimo that being Flavia's business partner is not the best idea. Julia's family opens the doors of their home to Rayo after being kicked out of Celeste's home. Julia receives information about where Misael might be. Ángel is beaten in the street. The arguments between Máximo and Flavia increase to the point of affecting Teo. Ángel mistakenly calls Julia to explain what happened and she goes out to look for him. After being hospitalized, Ángel wants to return home, but Julia tries to calm him down and they kiss.
32	"La ilusión de volver a enamorarnos"	30 August 2022	3.1
Máximo wants Teo to move in with him. Ana Sofi arrives at the hospital to see Ángel, but he confesses that his father was to blame for his beating. Julia and Celeste argue over Rayo's education. Lenar thinks it is not time to marry Donato and avoids the talk. Ebenezer wants to go to work in the United States, but Jerónimo objects. Ángel confronts Silvano and confirms that he ordered the beating. Gina tells Julia that Ángel and Ana Sofi have probably resumed their relationship. Esther and Jerónimo have to pretend to be a couple in front of everyone's eyes, including Claudia's, so they must sleep in the same bed. Ana Sofi discovers Ángel and Julia's conversation.
33	"Obsesionarnos con algo"	31 August 2022	3.2
After discovering the messages between Ángel and Julia, Ana Sofi prefers to leave the apartment, but waits for Ángel. Esther and Jerónimo enjoy spending the night together. Homero sufferes another crisis in which he takes Luisa, one of the house maids, by force. Julia, Esther and Celeste argue about Rayo's future, but everything gets out of control when they learn that Rayo suspects that Misael is her father. Celeste asks Esther not to look any further into Margarita's past. Jerónimo and his sons start repairing the food truck, this surprises Flavia. Julia confesses that she knows Misael's whereabouts. Teo helps Rayo to investigate more about her father. Esther discovers another secret about Margarita.
34	"Consecuencias que afectan a quien menos imaginamos"	1 September 2022	3.3
Julia refuses to kiss Ángel again and makes it clear that everything she does for Misael is for Dani's benefit. After what they discovered in Margarita's recipe notebook, Rayo and Teo fear being siblings. Ángel tells Julia that he broke up with Ana Sofi because she doesn't love him. Flavia overhears Teo and Máximo's conversation about the latter's relationship with Margarita. Ana Sofi and Julia meet at a fashion show, but the meeting turns chaotic. Julia asks Rayo to confide in to talk about Misael's supposed paternity. Esther is on a call with Julia because the latter wants to know more about the money Misael stole, but Esther confirms that Margarita worked at the Funes company.
35	"Nada es como parece"	2 September 2022	2.9
Ana Sofi makes a video against Julia and wants to ruin her internet business. Esther tries to learn more about Braulio's past at the Funes company. Teo plans to check if Rayo and he are siblings. Mati overhears Julia's conversation in which she is looking for a person to work at Angel's house. Esther visits Celeste and raises some doubts about her friendship with Margarita. Flavia interrupts a meeting with Máximo to find out if he had a relationship with Margarita. Celeste questions Braulio about whether he knew Margarita when he worked at Funes Enterprises and he recalls a conversation with her.
36	"A veces la verdad duele"	5 September 2022	2.9
Flavia suspects that Máximo is Rayo's father, while Celeste thinks that her husband is Rayo's father. Ángel is not willing to sell his company. Julia's career is affected by Ana Sofi. Rodolfo suspects that Julia has feelings for Ángel. Flavia asks Jerónimo for advice. Ana Sofi leaves Ángel's house. Flavia reveals to Esther that Máximo was unfaithful to her. Esther and Celeste want Rayo to return to school.
37	"Comienza el principio del fin"	6 September 2022	3.0
Celeste does not trust Braulio, so she demands a DNA test to prove that he is not Rayo's father. Julia and Esther look for a school for Rayo. Braulio scolds Rayo for saying that he is his real father and assures her that she could end up in trouble for not having a family. Braulio thinks that Esther told Celeste that he is Rayo's father. Rayo no longer wants to live with Esther, however, she has to hide because she is wanted by the police. Celeste confesses to her friends that she has multiple sclerosis.
38	"Liberar la furia que sentimos"	7 September 2022	3.2
Rayo takes out her hatred for Braulio by vandalizing his car. Braulio argues with Julia, Esther and Celeste over Rayo. Rayo lies to Julia and sleeps in the street. Braulio agrees to take a DNA test. Esther's mother gets sick and ends up in the hospital. Gina angers Ana Sofi by making a mistake. Julia asks Ángel for a big favor. Esther's mother warns Jerónimo about Flavia. Esther receives a mysterious message.
39	"Algo que nos deja marcados de por vida"	8 September 2022	2.9
Silvano loses track of Misael. Gina patches things up with Ana Sofi. Rayo lies to Julia again. Ángel confesses to Braulio that he is in love with Julia. Esther asks Jerónimo for advice about the message she received. Celeste learns that Rayo stopped living with Julia and they decide to do a DNA test to find out if Braulio is her real father. Flavia asks Máximo for a divorce. Julia and Ángel spend time together and kiss.
40	"Dudar de todo y de todos"	9 September 2022	2.7
Ana Sofi suspects that Julia is an accomplice of Misael. Julia and Ángel start dating formally. Flavia tells her son that she and Máximo are getting divorced. Braulio is against Celeste continuing her studies. Gina and Julia make peace. Ángel discovers that Matilde is underage and fires her. Gina resigns from working with Ana Sofi and now decides to be an influencer. Máximo suspects that Flavia has feelings for Jerónimo. Rodolfo discovers Ángel kissing Julia. Cinthia arrives with Esther to tell her that Iván became a father.
41	"¿Conoces muy bien a tus hijos?"	12 September 2022	3.2
Esther hears Cinthia's story with Iván. Jerónimo thinks that Cinthia is taking advantage of Esther's pain. Máximo meets his grandson and confronts Jerónimo about his relationship with Flavia. Jerónimo gives Cinthia a warning. Gina begins her revenge against Ana Sofi. Rodolfo reveals his secret to Julia.
42	"Lo que pasó no fue como uno se lo imaginó"	13 September 2022	3.0
Julia finds Misael after several months. Esther is angry with Jerónimo for bothering Cinthia. Julia receives bad news about Misael's health. Gina makes a livestream to confess everything that Ana Sofi did to her and her sister. Misael confesses to Julia everything that happened while he was absent.
43	"El daño está hecho"	14 September 2022	2.9
Ana Sofi confronts Gina about the livestream she made with her accounts. Misael admits to Julia that he had nothing with Margarita, but he was unfaithful with other women. Lenar asks Donato to stay out of conversations with her children. Celeste and Braulio want to buy a house together. Esther feels bad because her son had more confidence in other people before her. Julia and Celeste are worried about Rayo, but she stays at Homero's house. Esther receives the lab results and confirms that Dennis is her grandson. Cinthia abandons Dennis with Esther.
44	"Todos caemos en la trampa de los celos"	15 September 2022	2.4
Lenar tells Jerónimo that she can't stand seeing him with another woman and admits that she made a mistake in her relationship with Donato. Flavia and Jerónimo are happy with the inauguration of their business, despite the memories of Esther, Julia and Celeste. Ángel wants to know what is going on with Julia and the reasons for their estrangement. Máximo wants to return to Esther's house to live with her. Jerónimo discovers the place where Cinthia is probably staying. Misael calls Julia, Dani answers and Ángel learns that Julia lied to him.
45	"Esperar que todo se resuelva por arte de magia"	16 September 2022	2.7
Máximo insists on living with Esther to be near his grandson, but she objects. Julia pretends to talk to a client and prevents Ángel from finding out that Misael is alive. Julia gets a temporary home for Misael, but warns him that all she wants from him is a divorce. Jerónimo informs Esther that Cinthia probably has an addiction. Silvano confesses to Ana Sofi that the money Misael lost belongs to the Ordax family. Misael reappears at Dani's school.
46	"Meter aguja para sacar hebra"	19 September 2022	2.9
Cinthia prevents Jerónimo and his sons from being hurt by the delinquents in the colony. Ana Sofi looks for Julia at Dani's school to ask her to stay away from Ángel, but Misael wants to know the reason for her visit. Misael learns that he is not only being pursued by the police, but also by the Funes family. Cinthia refuses to receive Jerónimo's help. Esther puts a stop to Jerónimo about Dennis' future by her side and asks him to stop investigating Cinthia. Ángel searches for Julia because he wants to know the reasons why she avoids him. Esther reveals to Máximo that she and Jerónimo do not have a relationship. Ángel finds out that Julia is hiding Misael.
47	"La vida tiene sus propios terremotos"	20 September 2022	3.1
Julia tries to explain to Ángel what happened with Misael. Braulio manages to convince Celeste that the best thing for their family is to be in a new house. Ángel suspects that there is a mysterious relationship between Zachary and Armando. Ana Sofi calls Ángel to meet again, but as friends and he accepts. Erik insists on going out with Gina, but a phone call from Fabiola provokes Gina's jealousy. Flavia confesses to Esther that she will live with Jerónimo and later surprises him with a kiss. Misael appears in front of Celeste, Rayo and Esther.
48	"El peor día de nuestras vidas"	21 September 2022	2.9
Misael explains to Esther, Celeste and Rayo what happened the day of the accident. They all insist that he turn himself in to the police. Flavia apologizes to Jerónimo for stealing a kiss. Esther gives Misael a few days to look for evidence, Julia asks him to keep his word. Lenar offers Jerónimo to return to her house. Donato gets jealous when he sees Jerónimo in the house and believes that Lenar still loves him. Flavia hears that Dani will visit his father and takes advantage of this to report Misael to the police.
49	"Lo único seguro es la muerte"	22 September 2022	3.0
Misael goes to the public prosecutor's office and believes that Julia and Ángel are to blame for his arrest. Homero admits to Ángel that Silvano always wanted to be a partner of the Funes company, but he prevented him from doing so. Flavia reveals to Celeste and Braulio that she reported Misael. Zachary visits Misael and has a strong warning in exchange for the money. Julia complains to Flavia for reporting Misael. Donato apologizes to Jerónimo for the altercation they had. Misael asks Julia to keep her distance for fear that something will happen to her or Dani. Silvano is killed when he is thrown down the elevator shaft.
50	"Actuar con despecho"	23 September 2022	2.5
Silvano's death is declared an accident. Jerónimo comes to Cinthia's rescue and prevents her from killing herself by an overdose. Braulio tells Ángel that Misael is out of jail. Máximo looks for Flavia to complain to her because she is thinking of bringing Jerónimo to her house and believes it is because of her sentimental interest in him. Teo tricks his mother into letting him go out with Mati, but they start to get drunk and kiss. Ángel and Ana Sofi spend the night together, but are seen by Julia.
51	"¿Todo vuelve a ser como antes?"	26 September 2022	3.1
Dani gives Ángel his t-shirt and Julia tells him that they will never see him again. Ángel explains to Ana Sofi that what happened between them was a mistake. Julia insists on separating from Misael, but he tries to convince her that it could hurt Dani. Faced with doubts about her husband, Celeste discovers that the jewelry Braulio gave her cost a fortune. Armando confesses to Ángel that he was Silvano's worker. Ángel discovers Misael at the Miranda's house and tries to solve the problems they have pending, but Misael opposes.
52	"Hacer algo que nos lastime el alma"	27 September 2022	3.3
Ángel explains to Julia what happened with Ana Sofi and promises never to cheat on her. Esther thinks Braulio is in shady business and lets Celeste know. Teo tells Rayo that he plans to have his first time with Mati. Esther begins to find out more about Braulio's salary at the Funes company. Rayo takes advantage of the fact that there is no one in the Funes' house and when she enters the rooms she discovers that Homero is planning on killing himself. Julia follows Misael's steps because she distrusts him. Ángel receives his father's tablet in which he learns that his father wants to take his own life.
53	"Cuando alguien nos roba la paz"	28 September 2022	3.1
Ángel rushes home to find out the reasons why his father is thinking of taking his own life. Flavia assures Teo that from now on he will have to do his own chores. Braulio tries to convince Ángel that he needs to rest and he will be in charge of the company. Ana Sofi arrives at Ángel's apartment and asks him to move back in together because of the good he is doing for her. Mati and her friends arrive at the Funes' house to steal, but Homero wakes up to the noise and defends Rayo, mistaking her for Margarita.
54	"Afrontar las consecuencias"	29 September 2022	3.2
Ángel discovers that his house was burglarized and when he tries to defend himself, Rayo is shot. Rayo declares what happened during her stay at the Funes' house and divides opinions between Ángel and Mirna, because she wants Rayo to pay, but Ángel does not accept. Rayo finally feels understood for everything that has happened to her. Rayo is released, but soon after she is sought by family services to learn more about her case and is informed that she was denounced by Mirna Funes. Homero talks to his son about Margarita and has a confession for him.
55	"Las sorpresas vienen de quien menos lo imaginas"	30 September 2022	2.8
Homero tells Ángel the truth about Margarita. Mirna does not want to withdraw the complaint against Rayo. Celeste confesses to Braulio that she already knows the value of her jewelry and asks him to tell her if he is in shady business. Rayo admits that she made a mistake and is willing to pay for it. Julia believes Rayo is Homero's daughter and plans to find out with Ángel's help. Ángel reveals to Rayo that he is her brother. Misael introduces himself to Braulio and calls him a partner.
56	"Escarbar en el pasado"	3 October 2022	3.0
The plan to steal the money from Transportes Funes was part of Braulio's plan, but Misael tries to negotiate his share. Homero finds out that Rayo is his daughter. Esther tells Jerónimo that Lenar wants to get back together with him. Julia and Misael discover that Dani is lost in Matehuala.
57	"Abrirle los ojos a alguien"	4 October 2022	3.3
Misael insists on spending more time with Julia and tells Dani to hide, but out of fear, he returns to his mother. Lenar tells Jerónimo that she used the money she had to help her family. Máximo assures Flavia that he will decide what happens to their property after their separation. Chilo threatens Mati for what happened a few days ago. Braulio tells Celeste that Margarita's reputation in the company was not the best among her colleagues. Braulio assures Misael that Julia and Ángel are lovers.
58	"Cada nombre tiene un poder"	5 October 2022	3.3
Misael wants to know what Julia has on her cell phone and if she is really hiding something from him. Flavia tries to turn Celeste against her friends. In view of Misael's behavior, Julia gives him an ultimatum to leave the house. Ángel takes Rayo to live at the Funes' house and despite Homero's health crisis, Mirna only wants her to leave. While Esther seeks custody of Denis, Cinthia is willing to fight for her son.
59	"Somos el malo en el cuento del otro"	6 October 2022	3.1
Cinthia waits to leave the rehabilitation center to take care of her son. Máximo tells Esther that Jerónimo and Flavia have started a relationship. Julia reminds Misael that his deadline to be in the house has passed. Esther discovers that Jerónimo knew all along about Cinthia's whereabouts. Ana Sofi shows up at Ángel's office and threatens to repossess Transportes Funes.
60	"Vender el alma a la persona que menos quieres"	7 October 2022	2.6
Jerónimo explains to Esther the reasons why he did not talk to Cinthia with her. Misael ends up furious with Julia and tears up the divorce papers. Braulio tries to convince Ángel not to partner with Ana Sofi, but he accepts Ana Sofi's conditions to be a partner of Transportes Funes. Jerónimo argues with Esther and assures her that Dennis is not a replacement for Iván. Misael appears as a new employee at the Funes company.
61	"Sacar un lado retorcido"	10 October 2022	3.5
Ángel accepts Misael in the company and explains his reasons to Julia. Rayo tells Homero about the last moments she spent with her mother. Homero suffers a crisis, after which he confesses to Rayo that she was conceived with a lot of love. Esther is furious with Máximo because she does not think that Cinthia would take her son away from her. Misael questions Julia about whether she has something with Ángel and she admits to being in love, Misael can't stand the answer and tries to abuse her.
62	"Nadie debe humillar a ninguna persona"	11 October 2022	3.2
Esther is disappointed with Jerónimo for taking Cinthia to his house. Misael tries to take Julia by force, but she escapes. Mati and Chilo plan to rob Teo's house. Misael keeps Julia's phone and deceives Ángel about her love situation. Upon arriving home, Misael asks Julia to confess the reasons for their separation. Misael uses Dany and turns him against Ángel.
63	"No debemos permitir el machismo"	12 October 2022	3.3
Rayo overhears Ángel's conversation with his father and tells Julia what is going on. Julia confesses to Ángel that Misael tried to take advantage of her, she asks Ángel not to complain to Misael for any reason. Chilo and Mati start to empty Flavia's apartment, she finds out, calls Jerónimo. Seeing themselves in danger, Chilo and Mati threaten Teo.
64	"Cuando la vida nos pega más duro"	13 October 2022	3.1
Jerónimo proposes to Chilo to be a hostage in exchange for freeing Teo, but he opposes, Mati attacks Chilo and is arrested by the police. Rayo confronts Mati for what she did with Teo. Flavia complains to Esther for demanding time from Máximo and preventing him from being by Teo's side, Esther slaps her.
65	"Un demonio disfrazado de ángel"	14 October 2022	3.1
Braulio is surprised with Ángel's decision to audit Funes companies. Flavia offers her support to Cinthia to separate Esther from Dennis. Julia tells Ángel that Misael took Dany, but they are spied by Ana Sofi. Jerónimo asks Esther to forgive Cinthia for what she did with Dennis and to think things over before acting. Dany calls Misael to tell him that he is afraid to be alone, but is ignored by him. Later, Dany is put in danger with a short circuit in the house.
66	"¿Qué es lo que nos hace familia?"	17 October 2022	3.1
Misael arrives home and discovers that his son is intoxicated. Dany wakes up and this reassures Misael, but his happiness ends after Ana Sofi reveals that Julia and Ángel are looking for his location. Julia arrives at Misael's apartment and discovers the fire and agrees to meet him to see her son. Esther tries to make Cinthia feel bad about her care for Dennis. Julia manages to reunite with her son, but Misael insists that it is best to have Dany by his side. Julia asks Misael to think things over, but he tells her that Dany will come back to her only if she forgets about Ángel.
67	"Hacer daño"	18 October 2022	3.3
Julia opposes getting back together with Misael and he ends up taking Dany with him. Flavia warns Cinthia that one of her relatives must begin the custody process of Dennis and this raises Jerónimo's suspicions. Flavia takes advantage of Rayo and warns her that she has to pay Margarita's debt. Esther argues with Celeste about her decision to move and Braulio's possible fraudulent business dealings. Julia agrees to return to Misael, but he does not believe her word and insists on continuing to distance Dany. Máximo informs Esther that someone else is fighting for custody of her grandson.
68	"Culpar a otros"	19 October 2022	3.1
Julia falls for Misael's blackmail to get back together, but she seeks Ángel's help immediately. Ángel supports Julia so that Dany can return to her side, but they need proof about the accident Misael was involved in. Esther confronts Cinthia and Jerónimo for trying to separate her from her grandson. Rayo unmasks Doris in front of Mirna. Julia and Ángel learn that Misael was not driving the truck in which Margarita and Iván died. Cinthia confesses to Jerónimo that Flavia is behind Dennis' legal matter and this leads to the dissolution of the food truck partnership.
69	"La desesperación es mala consejera"	20 October 2022	3.0
Jerónimo insists on undoing his partnership with Flavia, but she justifies what he did with Cinthia. Julia agrees to leave with Misael in exchange for her son to be by her side. Esther tricks Jerónimo by telling him that she needs the address where Cinthia used to live to give it to Julia. Julia sets a trap for Misael and is left without Dany. Esther accuses Cinthia and her sister of carrying drugs in their car.
70	"El pasado, pasado está"	21 October 2022	3.3
Jerónimo admits to Flavia that he is in love with Esther. Homero returns house, but encounters all the problems this causes for his children. Braulio tries to convince Ana Sofi to sell her shares in the Funes companies. Julia confesses to her friends that Misael was not driving the truck the day of the accident and this raises suspicions among all of them. Laura believes that her sister Cinthia lied to her about quitting drugs.
71	"Nos toca perder a alguien"	24 October 2022	3.2
Laura withdraws her support for Cinthia to get Dennis back after being arrested and accused of drug possession. Dany tells Julia that he could go back to his father's side if she doesn't break up with Ángel. Rayo visits Mati and makes her see reason to correct her mistakes, she decides to turn herself in to the police.
72	"¿Todas las mujeres somos sororas?"	25 October 2022	2.9
Jerónimo and his sons receive the news that Lenar suffered a car accident and is brain dead. Ana Sofi goes to Julia's house to complain about what she is doing with Dany, Julia is unaware that Ana Sofi is filming her. Esther looks for Cinthia and finds out that she is using drugs again. Ana Sofi's video causes Julia to be attacked on social media. Rayo decides to leave Homero's house after Mirna insulted her, Homero follows her and gets lost.
73	"Una decepción mayor"	26 October 2022	3.3
Lenar's organs are donated. Misael finds Homero wandering the streets. Bruno and Misael take advantage of Homero's illness. Ángel and Rayo receive bad news about their father. Jerónimo discovers Esther's secret.
74	"Aplastar sin piedad"	27 October 2022	3.3
Jerónimo tells Esther how Iván's last moments were, she reflects and is willing to learn to live without her son, in addition to repairing the damage she did with Cinthia. Cinthia overhears Jerónimo and Flavia's conversation in which the latter reveals that Esther planted the drug in Laura's car. Ana Sofi presents Ángel with the results of the audit in which it is confirmed that Braulio stole from the Funes company for years.
75	"¿La mentira perfecta sí existe?"	28 October 2022	2.8
Ángel confronts Braulio about the frauds in the Funes company. Braulio tells Celeste about the differences he had with Ángel, but admits that he has no problem with continuing in the Funes company. Julia is nervous about what will happen at Dany's custody hearing. Celeste has some suspicions about what is going on with Braulio and when she goes to the apartment where Misael supposedly lived, she discovers that he was the one driving the truck.
76	"¿Te casaste con el hombre perfecto?"	31 October 2022	3.4
Flavia shows up at the Funes' house and discovers that Teo is staying there. Rayo asks his father to consider Mirna to work in the company because she has enough capacity to do it. Braulio threatens Ángel with airing all the bad actions of Funes companies if he does not let him work. The judge orders that Julia must keep custody of her son, while Misael must take therapy. Misael follows Julia's steps and discovers how happy she is next to Ángel and her family.
77	"Nuestra vida puede estar en peligro"	1 November 2022	3.0
Celeste is unable to tell her friends about her suspicions of Braulio, she confronts Braulio for deceiving her about the food truck accident. Mirna discovers Ana Sofi's true personality and calls her mean and classist to end their relationship. Esther is suspicious of the person who was driving the food truck on the day of the accident and confronts Braulio about it.
78	"Castigar a los justos"	2 November 2022	3.1
Misael takes no pity on Ángel and runs him over while he searches for Ana Sofi. Teo drinks uncontrollably and is abandoned by one of his friends in the park. After waiting, Julia and Ángel make love. Faced with Braulio's cynicism, Esther attacks him for being a suspect in the accident that killed her son.
79	"Cometer lo impensable"	3 November 2022	3.4
Faced with Teo's health crisis, Flavia and Máximo regret not having listened to their son and apologize for abandoning him. Esther does not intend to let Braulio go until he reveals what happened in the accident. Julia visits Misael in jail and he reveals everything that happened with Iván and Margarita before the accident. Braulio begins to tell what happened at the time he arrived in Laredo for Iván and Margarita, and that he was driving the food truck. Esther does not forgive Braulio for having caused the death of her son and her friend, but she is determined to get revenge.
80	"El amor se queda para toda la vida"	4 November 2022	3.6
Jerónimo, Ángel, Julia and Celeste prevent Esther from commenting on a mistake with Braulio. Braulio confesses to Celeste about Margarita's last moments after the accident. Flavia looks for Esther to ask her forgiveness for everything she did. Celeste sets a trap for Braulio and gathers all the evidence to present him to the authorities. Esther closes the cycle of her grief through a dream, in which she says goodbye to her son. Ivan's ashes are deposited in the park. After all the problems with Misael, Julia and Ángel already plan to live together as a family. Despite the risk, Celeste gives birth to her son with great success and is accompanied by her friends. Esther, Julia, Celeste and Rayo celebrate overcoming the adversities they had to face for several months.
