= Vencer la culpa =

- Genre: Telenovela
- Created by: Pedro Armando Rodríguez; Gerardo Pérez Zermeño
- Written by: Alejandra Romero; Humberto Robles; Luis Gamboa de Gamboa Gangoiti; Daniela Ochoa
- Directed by: Fernando Nesme; Benjamín Cann
- Starring: Claudia Martín; Gabriela de la Garza; Gabriel Soto; Matías Novoa; María Sorté; Carlos Ferro; Juan Carlos Barreto; Íngrid Martz
- Theme music composer: Mirley Cauich; Daniela Martínez Treviño; Natalia Velasco Alanís
- Opening theme: "Vencer la culpa" by Daniela Romo, Dulce, Fanny Lu and Paty Cantú
- Country of origin: Mexico
- Original language: Spanish
- No. of seasons: 1
- No. of episodes: 80

Production
- Executive producer: Rosy Ocampo
- Producer: Daniel Estrada
- Production company: TelevisaUnivision

Original release
- Network: Las Estrellas
- Release: 26 June – 13 October 2023

Related
- Vencer franchise

Vencer la culpa ('Overcoming Guilt') is a Mexican telenovela produced by Rosy Ocampo for TelevisaUnivision. The series is the fifth production of the "Vencer" franchise, and aired on Las Estrellas from 26 June 2023 to 13 October 2023. It stars Claudia Martín, Gabriela de la Garza, María Sorté and Romina Poza.

== Plot ==
Four women, Manuela (Gabriela de la Garza), Amanda (María Sorté), Paloma (Claudia Martín) and Yaneli (Romina Poza), find their fates intertwined when Dulce, a young woman they barely knew, mysteriously vanishes. Having doubts that her brother is involved in Dulce's disappearance, Yaneli decides to investigate, meeting Manuela, Paloma and Amanda along the way. Their search will lead them to build a strong friendship that will help them overcome their own guilt.

== Cast ==
=== Main ===
- Claudia Martín as Paloma
- Gabriela de la Garza as Manuela
- Gabriel Soto as Leandro
- Matías Novoa as Pablo
- María Sorté as Amanda
- Carlos Ferro as Franco
- Juan Carlos Barreto as Enrique
- Íngrid Martz as Carmina
- Helena Rojo as Ángeles
- Roberto Ballesteros as Everardo
- Romina Poza as Yaneli
- Jesusa Ochoa as Dulce
- Sammy Schoulund as Julieta
- Luis Gatica as Octavio
- Mónica Ayos as Adela
- Pablo Perroni as Ricky
- Pedro Mira as David
- Paulina Treviño as Tamara
- Manuela Ímaz as Lorena
- Mariana Cabrera as Tolita
- Sachi Tamashiro as Susana
- Haydee Navarra as Nancy
- Astrid Romo as Vicky
- José Ángel Bichir as Nicolás
- Deicardi Díaz as Genaro

=== Recurring and guest stars ===
- Fátima Nicole as Susy
- Héctor Salas as Pablito
- Nacho Tahhan as Walter
- Max Uribe as Luis Felipe
- Íker Vallin as Andy
- Santiago Beltrán as Valentino
- Isabella Vázquez as Eva
- Checo Perezcuadra as Iñigo
- Ariadne Díaz as Julia Miranda
- Arcelia Ramírez as Inés

== Production ==
In October 2022, Rosy Ocampo announced that a fifth series for the Vencer franchise was in development. On 4 November 2022, it was announced that Vencer la culpa would be the title of the series. Throughout late March and early April, Ocampo revealed cast and characters through her social media accounts. Filming began on 14 April 2023.

== Ratings ==
Viewership and ratings per season of Vencer la culpa
Season	Timeslot (CT)	Episodes	First aired		Last aired		Avg. viewers (millions)
Season	Timeslot (CT)	Episodes	Date	Viewers (millions)	Date	Viewers (millions)	Avg. viewers (millions)
1	Mon–Fri 8:30 p.m.	80	26 June 2023	2.8	13 October 2023	3.3	2.80

== Episodes ==
No.	Title	Original release date	Mexico viewers (millions)
1	"Hay que hacernos responsables de nuestros actos"	26 June 2023 (Note: Premiered early online through Las Estrellas website on 23 June 2023.)	2.8
Paloma is excited about getting married, but her fiancé refuses to marry her. Manuela has several jobs so she can give her daughter a decent life, but Julieta only asks her mother for time together. Walter, Paloma's new boyfriend, is not well received by her parents. Tamara visits Amanda at her business to convince her mother to return home to take care of her father. Pablo tells Carmina that he feels guilty about Mariana's death. Leandro assures his mother that if she agrees to take care of his father, it would be a great opportunity for the two of them to reconcile. Walter proposes to Paloma to go with him to Miami. Leandro arrives at the Atenea Center where Manuela works and finds out that he has a daughter. Julieta, upon learning that her mother hid the truth from her father, confronts her and suffers an accident.
2	"Quiero estar cerca de ti"	27 June 2023	3.1
Leandro celebrates that thanks to the plan he put together with the woman who was beaten, he managed to get closer to Manuela, she in her attempt to calm Julieta, meets Pablo. Manuela reveals to Julieta that for a long time she was Leandro's lover, since he never told her that he was married, Julieta asks her not to separate her from her father. Adela and Octavio are not convinced that Paloma should go with Walter to live in Miami, so they question her love for him. Leandro tells Julieta that if he had known Manuela was pregnant, he would never have left them. Leandro meets with Manuela to beg her to allow him to be close to his daughter and reveals that he is willing to fight for her love.
3	"Paloma vive otra desilusión amorosa"	28 June 2023	2.9
Leandro swears to Manuela that he will divorce his wife, she distrusts his word and tells him that for the time being she will supervise his visits with Julieta. Pablo goes to the government offices for help in finding his son Damián. Carmina is sure that when Pablo returns, she will reconcile with him. Roy proposes to Yaneli to steal Professor Edgar's computer in order to erase their grades and thus not take the exam, she asks him for time to think about it. Carmina makes Pablo believe that Damián will continue to hide since the day he left the house, he broke the bond with the family. Walter stands up Paloma on the day of her proposal.
4	"Quiero el divorcio"	29 June 2023	2.9
Three years ago, Damián assures Pablo that Carmina is deceiving him, she takes it badly and asks Pablo to choose between Damián or his family. Manuela is sure that Julieta was impressed by Leandro's money and breaks down in tears knowing that she does not see the sacrifices she makes to give her the best. Yaneli is accused of stealing her teacher's computer, she denies everything, but the police ask her to reveal her accomplice's identity. Everardo insults Amanda in front of the whole family, she puts a stop to it. Pablo asks Carmina for a divorce when he confirms that both she and her sister have been stealing money from the company.
5	"Dulce desapareció"	30 June 2023	2.9
Everardo arrives at Amanda's business to apologize, but she does not believe he is sorry. Everardo learns that Leandro had a daughter out of wedlock and advises him to take a DNA test, Leandro tells him that Manuela is telling the truth. Paloma, knowing that Dulce could be in danger, decides to file a complaint, but receives no support from the authorities. Yaneli suspects that something happened to her brother since he did not come home to sleep. Manuela tries to comfort Leandro upon finding out his father's condition, Leandro kisses her, Julieta sees them and celebrates the moment.
6	"Nadie te va amar como Leandro"	3 July 2023	2.6
Carmina denies to Pablo that she is capable of keeping him away from his son and assures him that he is to blame for Mariana's death because he insisted on being a father. Yaneli shares with Genaro that she is afraid to go out on the street since she found out about the disappearance of Dulce, a young woman who lived in the neighborhood. Carmina makes Pablito believe that he is to blame for all her problems in her marriage and that she will never forget what Damián did to her. Julieta meets her grandfather, Everardo asks Manuela not to abandon his son when he is gone because no one will love them as much as Leandro.
7	"Leandro comienza a distanciarse de su esposa"	4 July 2023	2.7
Lorena, Leandro's wife, visits him at the hospital, Leandro is surprised by her visit and she questions him about the woman who was with her father-in-law. Manuela, having more information that could help Pablo to find his son's whereabouts, looks for him, but he makes her an invitation. Julieta lies and tells Leandro that her mom is very enthusiastic about him, so she plans to be his accomplice so that he can woo her. Lorena sees that Leandro is no longer spending much time at home, and questions him, but he assures her that he is worried about his father. Pablo goes out in search of his son Damián, but he is a victim of crime. Lorena suspects that Leandro is hiding something from her.
8	"Les presento a Leandro Govea"	5 July 2023	2.6
Lorena, having the name of Leandro's mysterious woman, begins to investigate her on social media. Carmina tells her sister that she has financial control of Pablo and will try to keep it that way for a long time. Yaneli realizes that her brother Genaro gets nervous when she mentions Dulce and believes he may be involved in her disappearance. Julieta is excited about forming a musical band, but is sure that no one would like her because she is not pretty. Amanda confirms that Everardo changed the pills just to blame her and leave her in a negative position with her children.
9	"¿Crees que te engaño?"	6 July 2023	2.9
Lorena arrives at Manuela's job to make her believe that her foundation wants to help the Atenea Center, but in reality it is only to meet her. Everardo plays the victim with his children and causes Leandro and Tamara to get upset with Amanda for her carelessness. Julieta, upon learning that her mother did not accept the apartment that her father offered them, assures her that she is disappointed because she only thinks of herself and not her well-being. Lorena surprises Leandro in his office, he gets upset and asks her to notify him since he is a busy man, she insinuates that his reaction is due to an infidelity. Amanda, upon learning of Manuela's concern for Dulce's safety, questions her for not attending to her when she looked for her at the center where she works.
10	"Leandro quiere darle su apellido a Julieta"	7 July 2023	2.9
Julieta complains to her mom for having gotten her hopes up about the idea of her father's apartment, Manuela apologizes and assures her that when she turns 18, she can go live with him. Paloma confronts Franco after he accuses her of not keeping her work schedule. Tamara recognizes that Amanda is an excellent mother and breaks down in tears when she learns that her marriage failed because of her. Leandro asks Manuela for a second chance, she refuses. Carmina tells Pablo that he will never see his son again if he continues with the idea of divorce, he reiterates that he no longer loves her.
11	"Manuela confirma que Leandro es hijo de Amanda"	10 July 2023	2.6
Carmina sends Nancy to meet with Pablo's detective to convince him to stop investigating Damián's disappearance. Franco apologizes to Paloma when he learns the reasons for her absence from work. Leandro tells his father that he wants Manuela, Everardo asks him not to be obsessed because she may be playing hard to get, to manipulate him. Leandro takes out Lorena for their anniversary, she hesitantly questions him about the mysterious women and he makes her believe that she may be his father's mistress. Manuela finds out that Leandro is Amanda's son and confirms that he is still married. Lorena desperately searches for Manuela.
12	"Usted es la mujer más hermosa del mundo"	11 July 2023	2.7
Manuela tells Leandro that she has already knows that he is not divorced. Leandro, believing that Lorena spoke to Manuela, goes home and humiliates her by calling her a bad mother and wife. Amanda complains to Leandro for covering up her father's infidelity and agreeing to meet with his lover and daughter. Manuela meets with the school principal, who informs her that due to her students' complaints and her tardiness, he has decided to fire her as a teacher.
13	"Manuela rechaza regresar con Leandro"	12 July 2023	2.8
In a flashback, Leandro asks the university president to remove Manuela from her position. Everardo tells Leandro that he cannot be his cover. Julieta sends a message to Leandro because she thinks he is angry with her, he replies, but by mistake, he sends it to Lorena. Paloma arrives at the same restaurant where Walter is, she decides to confront him, but has an accident. Julieta, upon learning that her mother does not plan to rebuild her life with Leandro, insults her. Lorena confirms with the image that Julieta shared, that Leandro has a daughter out of wedlock.
14	"Encuentran pruebas en contra del agresor de Dulce"	13 July 2023	2.8
Weeks before, Genaro and Dulce give each other gifts with the intention of never forgetting the love between the two of them. Leandro tries to convince the school principal not to expel Julieta, Manuela tries to talk and is ignored by both of them. Julieta reacts aggressively when she learns that her trip is cancelled. Lorena seeks out Manuela to confess that her marriage is suffering a crisis. Yaneli finds in Genaro's bedroom a bracelet just like the one Dulce had, so her suspicions increase that he has something to do with her disappearance.
15	"Lorena revela que Manuela es la amante de Leandro"	14 July 2023	2.2
Paloma resigns from her job because of Obregón's misogyny, he tries to convince her to stay. Franco asks Paloma to reconsider her decision. Manuela confesses to Vicky that she is attracted to Pablo and that he is also beginning to have feelings for her. Everardo tells Amanda that Leandro had a daughter out of wedlock. Lorena reveals to Amanda that Manuela is Leandro's lover. Amanda confronts Manuela and calls her a shameless woman.
16	"Leandro se hace la víctima con Amanda"	17 July 2023	2.5
Manuela puts a stop to Amanda's insults and asks her to stay out of a situation she has no knowledge of. Lorena gets upset with Amanda when she sees the complaint she made to Manuela. Carmina learns that a friend of Pablo's is accompanying him in all of Damián's proceedings and gets jealous. Manuela apologizes to Inés when she notices Julieta's rude attitude, Inés advises her to have communication and trust with her daughter. Enrique arrives at Amanda's house to ask her to be his girlfriend.
17	"Franco acepta que extraña a Paloma"	18 July 2023	2.5
Paloma confronts her parents for losing their money gambling, but they only victimize themselves in the situation. Manuela tells Julieta that she regrets keeping her away from her father, but that when she made the decision, she believed she was doing the right thing. Yaneli insists that Genaro let her work to help him with the household expenses, he opposes, but reacts aggressively. Amanda asks Leandro to look for Lorena, but he tells her that it is best to give her time. Pablo tells Manuela that she deserves to be loved and kisses her.
18	"Tenemos que hablar de divorcio"	19 July 2023	2.4
Manuela tells Pablo that the best thing for the two of them is not to see each other, since it is not the right time to have a relationship. Manuela assures Lorena that she has no intention of being with Leandro. Pablo tells Carmina that if they are still together it is because of Pablito and not because of them. Amanda confesses to Everardo that she is giving herself the opportunity to meet someone, he mocks her. Julieta arrives at Amanda's store ready to meet her grandmother. Lorena informs Leandro that she has started the divorce process.
19	"¿Hablaste con esa roba maridos?"	20 July 2023	2.6
Julieta tries to meet her grandmother, but Amanda rejects her as her granddaughter. Leandro is upset with Julieta when he learns that she made a decision without his consent. Pablo arrives at Doña Efi's house hoping to find Damián; however, she lets him know that he no longer lives there. Everardo assures Leandro that he deserves everything that is happening because he wanted to play with Lorena and Manuela. Amanda, seeing that Lorena is not willing to forgive Leandro, assures her that she cannot be on her side. Yaneli reveals to Manuela that she once witnessed Genaro being aggressive with Dulce, and fears that he is involved in her disappearance.
20	"¿Quién te manda mensajes a esta hora?"	21 July 2023	2.3
Amanda, upon learning that Yaneli is Genaro's sister, decides to fire her and tells her that the best thing to do is to report him. Paloma decides that the best thing to do is for her parents to move into her apartment. Leandro makes evident his annoyance for Julieta's audacity to go to meet her grandmother and informs Manuela that he has already started the process to give their daughter his last name. Leandro wants to know who is sending messages to Manuela, she tells him that he has no right to question her private life. Genaro accepts in front of Yaneli that he assaulted Dulce, but regrets what happened, the police arrive to arrest him.
21	"Cualquier adulto puede cometer un error"	24 July 2023	2.5
Genaro, knowing that he will be arrested, hits an officer and flees, Yaneli is called to testify about what happened. Franco insists that Paloma return to the office because he needs her to move the project forward, she refuses. Julieta announces to her family that her father is going to cover the expenses of her Quinceañera party. Manuela asks Yaneli to declare the whole truth, Yaneli tells her that she does not want to harm her brother. Leandro meets with his children, discredits Lorena and tells them that he is willing to fight for them.
22	"Ya no tengo ninguna responsabilidad contigo"	25 July 2023	2.6
Yaneli breaks down in tears when she believes she betrayed Genaro by declaring everything she knew, Manuela and Paloma surprise her by giving her a cake for her 18th birthday. Julieta accepts that she has not been the best daughter and apologizes to Manuela. Genaro contacts Yaneli and lets her know that thanks to her he is in trouble. Carmina sends Manuela's phone number to Nancy and asks her to investigate if she is the woman who Pablo is interested in. Paloma agrees to work with Franco under certain conditions. Amanda surprises Yaneli with her visit.
23	"Aquí están los papeles del divorcio"	26 July 2023	2.6
Pablo remembers the day he threw Damián out of his house, after he had a fight with Carmina. As a birthday present, Julieta asks her father for cosmetic surgery so that she can have a perfect body. Genaro asks Yaneli to give her life a chance so that she doesn't disappoint their parents, because for him, she doesn't mean anything anymore. Paloma and Franco celebrate that their project was one of the selected ones and they kiss. Pablo gives Carmina the divorce papers.
24	"El beso fue un error"	27 July 2023	2.7
Weeks ago, Adela and Octavio forbid Walter to marry Paloma. Leandro meets his Amanda's boyfriend and thinks that it is ridiculous to fall in love at her age. Leandro gets Julieta's friends drunk at her party in order to blame Manuela. Manuela informs her family that she was summoned to the school to talk about what happened at Julieta's birthday party. Franco reveals to Paloma that the kiss he gave her meant nothing. Julieta informs her father that she no longer wants to live with her mother.
25	"Quiero saber si está saliendo con un hombre"	28 July 2023	2.5
With the intention of getting her scholarship back, Yaneli approaches her teacher Edgar and asks him out; however, he rejects her. Pablo lets Manuela know that he will soon be divorced and wants to take a chance with her. Julieta decides to stay in her father's apartment. Paloma is willing to play with Franco's feelings. Enrique introduces Amanda as his girlfriend to his children. Leandro wants to know if Manuela is dating someone.
26	"Leandro me quiere quitar a mi hija"	31 July 2023	2.6
Susana refuses to let Amanda be her father's girlfriend, Enrique puts a stop to his children and kicks them out of the house. Edgar tells Yaneli that he is willing to help her get her scholarship back in exchange for extracurricular activities. Amanda blames Manuela for causing the end of Leandro and Lorena's marriage. Amanda, Manuela and Paloma agree to help Yaneli pay her tuition. Leandro reveals his plans to Manuela.
27	"Esa demanda te la voy a ganar"	1 August 2023	2.6
Manuela will defend herself legally to get Julieta back. Amanda, believing that her card was cloned, provides confidential information from the bank, but in reality she is the victim of a fraud and loses all her savings. Julieta assures Manuela that she does not plan to return to her grandmother's house since her father gives her everything she needs. Franco puts a stop to Obregón and asks him to apologize to Paloma after his sexist comment. Leandro gives Manuela the document that proves that Julieta already has the Govea surname.
28	"Julieta ya se apellida Govea"	2 August 2023	2.6
Franco tells Paloma that he wants them to give each other a chance. Manuela warns Julieta that she is being victimized by her Leandro since he only uses her to hurt her. Julieta demands that Manuela withdraw the lawsuit against her father or else she will hate her for the rest of her life. Carmina puts a price on Dr. Chavero in order to alter Pablito's medical results and in this way, keep Pablo with her.
29	"¿Eres hija de mi tío Leandro?"	3 August 2023	2.6
Dr. Chavero rejects Carmina's proposal, she gets naked and accuses him of trying to hurt her. Paloma confesses to Franco that she is afraid that he will abandon her like all her ex-boyfriends and asks him to keep their relationship a secret. Ángeles tries to defend Manuela from Leandro's attacks, but Amanda interferes and they confront each other. Tamara tries to humiliate Julieta during the family dinner, but Julieta makes a comment that leaves her speechless. Faced with Leandro's blackmail and threats, Manuela agrees to live with him in order to be near Julieta.
30	"Es momento de terminar lo que comenzó entre nosotros"	4 August 2023	2.5
Amanda asks her suppliers for a deadline to be able to raise money for her debts. Leandro tells Julieta that her mother has agreed to live in the apartment. Leandro announces to his parents that Manuela is going to live with him, Amanda opposes and tells him that the only daughter-in-law she will recognize is Lorena. Manuela arrives at Leandro's apartment; he takes advantage of the fact that they are alone to approach her with other intentions.
31	"Te exijo que no intentes comprarme"	7 August 2023	2.4
Faced with Leandro's insinuation, Manuela remembers the day she gave herself to him. Enrique, seeing that Amanda is going through a financial problem, decides to make a big purchase at her pet store. Manuela tells Julieta that she modified her schedule in order to spend more time with her. Obregón warns Franco that when he finishes consulting with the campaign he is ready to terminate his job, Franco asks him not to wait to fire him. Edgar discovers that Yaneli lives alone, so he surprises her at home and tries to overpower her.
32	"Mi matrimonio terminó por culpa tuya"	8 August 2023	2.5
María Paula arrives at Yaneli's house and prevents a misfortune from happening to her because of Professor Edgar. Amanda tells Yaneli that Enrique proposed a partnership to rescue the business and assures her that she will not lose her job. Lorena arrives at Leandro's apartment and discovers that his other family is there. Luis Felipe and Valentino accept Julieta as their sister and willing to spend time with her. Franco and Paloma take advantage of being alone in his office to kiss, but Obregón notices them.
33	"¿Por qué borraste fotos de tus redes?"	9 August 2023	2.8
Genaro asks Yaneli not to get involved in his case anymore because she could be in danger and assures her that Dulce was in serious trouble. Obregón questions Franco about the time he spends with Paloma and assures him that the decision to fire him is up to human resources. Leandro puts a stop to Julieta and assures her that he is tired of her spoiled brat attitude. Paloma tries to find out if Franco is single, so when she takes a document she finds photographs of Dulce and some personal items.
34	"Vivo con VIH"	10 August 2023	2.9
Manuela confesses to Vicky that she was surprised to see Pablo with Carmina, Vicky asks her if she felt jealous. Julieta takes advantage of going shopping with her mother to disappear as part of a dare with her friend Kiro. Manuela files a report for Julieta's disappearance, Leandro comforts her. Paloma, knowing she can't get much information out of Franco, asks Tolita to investigate. Paloma confronts Franco about the photographs he has of Dulce, he feels threatened and confesses that he has HIV.
35	"¿Eres el exnovio de Paloma?"	11 August 2023	2.6
Franco tells Paloma that he wanted to help her find Dulce's whereabouts, so he printed photos to post on social media; he also reveals that he is afraid to confess his illness to his parents because he might be rejected. Adela and Octavio take Paloma's cell phone to find out what their daughter is hiding and discover Franco's illness. Tired of Edgar's harassment, Yaneli threatens to report him. Everardo plans to perform a DNA test on Julieta. Franco meets with Adela and Octavio who ask him to leave Paloma or else he will regret it.
36	"Manuela le responde a Tamara"	14 August 2023	2.5
Walter tells Paloma that Adela and Octavio forced him to separate from her or else they were willing to reveal to her that he was in jail. Edgar demands Yaneli to end her friendship with his nephew Axel or else he will reveal that she flirted with him to get her scholarship back. Tamara questions Manuela about her relationship with Leandro. Leandro proposes to Manuela to defend Genaro throughout his trial, she doubts his good will and Vicky tells Manuela not to give him the investigation file. Paloma confronts her parents and gives them a week to leave her apartment.
37	"¿Leandro le pidió que me despidiera?"	15 August 2023	2.9
Paloma confirms that her parents are still gambling, Adela, feeling unprotected, begins to feel ill, but Paloma does not fall for her blackmail. Pablo arrives at Nora Pardo's apartment and questions her neighbor who assures him that she no longer lives in the building. Franco, feeling discriminated against because of his illness, gives his resignation to Obregón, who makes his rejection evident by insulting him. Professor Pérez confesses to Manuela that she lost her job after Leandro asked him to fire her, since he swore to him that he was doing it for the sake of his daughter. Franco assures Paloma that her fears and insecurities have returned now that everyone knows about his illness, so he decides to break up with her.
38	"Julieta no es tu hija"	16 August 2023	3.0
Franco blocks Paloma from his social media, she manages to talk to him with Tolita's phone, but he ends the call. Leandro confirms with a photo that Manuela is still seeing Pablo, so he makes a comment about honesty. Manuela tells her mother that her nightmares are back. Yaneli manages to report Edgar to the school authorities. After leaving school, Yaneli is kidnapped. Nicolás gives Everardo the results of the DNA test and confirms that Julieta is not his granddaughter and lets Leandro know.
39	"Tira a la basura a tu familia"	17 August 2023	2.8
After Franco's complaint, Obregón loses his job. Manuela and Paloma learn that Genaro declared himself responsible for Dulce's disappearance, so they distrust what he said. When Manuela learns that Yaneli is in danger, she takes her to live in her house while her brother's case is being clarified. Paloma finds a box in the bathroom of her apartment containing money and a letter to Damián.
40	"Te odio"	18 August 2023	2.9
Under pressure from school administrators, Yaneli accepts that she flirted with Edgar, but regrets her decision. Franco meets with his parents to confess his condition. When Amanda complains about her exclusion from meetings about Dulce, Paloma explains that the fact that she could not separate her problems with Manuela made them make that decision. Yaneli reveals to Paloma, Amanda and Manuela what she is going through with Professor Edgar, and they show their support. Manuela gives Dulce's letter to Pablo and discovers that Damián made Dulce go through terrifying moments.
41	"Sus problemas se llaman homofobia"	21 August 2023	2.9
Everardo suspects that Leandro is not his son, Amada denies this. Manuela introduces Pablo to Ricky and David, but when he learns that they are a couple, he rejects them. Julieta comments during dinner that she wants to take a family trip, Leandro supports her decision but Manuela remains silent. María Paula confirms that Yaneli sought out Professor Edgar with other intentions; when they are alone, she apologizes for her statements. Pablo reveals to Manuela that he kicked Damián out of his house when he found out about his homosexuality, but regrets his decision.
42	"Nunca me vuelvo a enamorar de alguien como tú"	22 August 2023	2.9
Carmina assures Pablo that Damián wanted to pervert Pablito by dressing him as a woman and asks him to decide between Damián or his family. Yaneli learns that she has been permanently expelled. Paloma arrives at the house her parents are renting and when she sees the place she assures them that they cannot live there and she will pay for a more decent apartment. Leandro complains to Manuela for sleeping with another man, she warns him that she would never fall in love again with a narcissistic person like him.
43	"Soy Leandro Govea, el papá de Julieta"	23 August 2023	2.9
Leandro assures Manuela that he will not allow Julieta to return to live with her family because there are freaks. Under pressure from Everardo, Amanda confirms that Leandro is not his son and reveals that the reason for her infidelity was because he is a violent and womanizing man. Everardo warns Amanda that he is willing to throw her in the mud if she disobeys his commands. Manuela confesses to her mother that after what happened with Yaneli, she has recently remembered the assault she experienced years ago.
44	"¿Andas con otro?"	24 August 2023	2.9
Manuela slaps Leandro to put a stop to his insults. Pablo warns Leandro that he is not Manuela's lover and makes it clear that he will not leave her alone in her fight for Julieta. Paloma meets with her parents to advise them that they should get psychological help and also says goodbye to them forever. Leandro takes advantage of the fact that Manuela is having nightmares to get into her bed, but is surprised.
45	"Leandro puso a alguien para vigilarnos"	25 August 2023	3.2
Everardo tells Leandro that he plans to make some changes to his will and wants to write a letter to the family. Everardo suffers a heart attack and dies. Amanda becomes the heir to Everardo's estate, but Leandro questions the notary if his father ever talked about a letter. Nicolás blackmails Amanda into revealing that Leandro is not Everardo's son and that thanks to this secret, his father-in-law died.
46	"¿Podríamos tener nuestra primera vez?"	28 August 2023	3.1
Manuela no longer wants to live with Leandro so she agrees to sleep with him in exchange for her freedom and that of her daughter. Walter comes clean with Paloma and assures her that he wants to regain her trust and love. Leandro convinces Julieta that it is best for her to return to live with him, Manuela tries to prevent her from being manipulated by her father. Kiro asks Julieta for her home address and assures her that he would love to have his first time with her.
47	"La culpa puede arrasar con todo"	29 August 2023	2.9
Franco asks Walter not to look for Paloma during her working hours as he may distract her. Nicolás covers Tamara's car with romantic messages as he wants to win back her love. Amanda finds Leandro's DNA test results and decides to burn them. Leandro decides not to take any memories of his father, but when he grabs one of his jackets he finds an envelope and believes it is the letter he told him about.
48	"Dulce está muerta"	30 August 2023	3.1
Tamara opens the envelope that Leandro found in their father's jacket and finds results of a DNA test, Nicolás assures them that his father-in-law was blackmailed by a secretary. Paloma agrees to be the new creative director of the digital company. Walter surprises Paloma with a serenade to congratulate her on her promotion and asks her to be his girlfriend. Manuela tells Paloma, Amanda and Yaneli that Genaro confessed that Dulce is dead. Leandro proves to Manuela that he is capable of anything to take Julieta away from her.
49	"La verdad está en la carta de Dulce"	31 August 2023	3.5
Manuela shares the location where Dulce's body is supposedly located, but Prosecutor Bravo informs them that they did not find any traces of her body. Pablo asks Carmina to stop being homophobic, she assures him that his change of ideologies is because of Manuela. Leandro distrusts the argument of Nicolás and sends a DNA test of his sister Tamara.
50	"No eres hijo de Everardo"	1 September 2023	2.9
Paloma confronts Franco for wanting to decide on her feelings, he asks her to be happy with Walter. Adela and Octavio accept that they did not act in the best way with Paloma and they want to be forgiven. Susana, believing that Julieta is to blame for her daughter's accident, confronts Amanda. Leandro reveals with a DNA test that Tamara is his half-sister, Amanda confesses that in reality, he is not Everardo's son.
51	"Podemos impedir que Manuela y Pablo se salgan con la suya"	4 September 2023	2.9
Leandro and Tamara blame their mother for Everardo's death, Amanda tries to defend herself and reveals that she was blackmailed by Nicolás to reveal her secret; Leandro hits him. Franco plans to change jobs, but Paloma suspects he is doing it to distance himself. Leandro is hurt by his mother's lie and decides to kick her out, Amanda begs him for a chance. Manuela arrives to Lorena's call and assures her that Leandro committed her against her will, she threatens to denounce the clinic for kidnapping.
52	"No hay rastro legal de Dulce"	5 September 2023	3.2
Lorena manages with the help of Manuela and Julieta to reunite with her children. Leandro learns that Lorena escaped from the psychiatric hospital and arrives hysterical at Manuela's house to confront her, but Julieta manages to convince him that her brothers should be with their mom. Prosecutor Bravo informs Manuela, Amanda, Paloma and Yaneli that there is no legal trace of Dulce, so the IDs that she had are false and he suspects that she may be a criminal.
53	"¡No puede ser, es Dulce!"	6 September 2023	2.8
Kiro pressures Julieta to take the pills so that her body looks like that of a young lady and not a girl. Enrique assures Amanda that he is no one to judge her since he also got married without being in love, both of them, feeling identified, give each other another chance. Walter gets upset with Paloma's parents for the way they express themselves about Franco and asks them to stop being prejudiced. Doña María turns to Manuela to help her with a woman who is seriously injured; when Manuela sees her, she confirms that it is Dulce.
54	"Dulce en realidad es Damián, tu hijo"	7 September 2023	2.9
Amanda does not accept that Leandro and Tamara blame her for Everardo's death and assures them that she will not allow any more disrespect. Manuela tries to make Dulce feel safe, but she keeps mentioning Damián. Yaneli meets Lisbeth, who was also a victim of Professor Edgar's harassment, but she was unable to report him because she did not have the support of her family. Pablo arrives at the hospital where Dulce is, Carmina reveals to him that in reality Dulce is his son Damián.
55	"Dulce es tu sangre, no la dejes de amar"	8 September 2023	2.7
Manuela tries to help Pablo in the process he is going through with his son Damián. Genaro reveals to Yaneli that the day she saw him arguing with Dulce was when she revealed her secret. Faced with the denial that Damián is now Dulce, Pablo is determined to perform a DNA test to see if she is indeed his son. Manuela tells Amanda, Paloma and Yaneli that the letter they found from Dulce was actually her saying goodbye to her name because she didn't feel identified with that gender. Dulce goes into shock, a situation that worries the doctors attending her.
56	"¿Quién salió de la cárcel?"	11 September 2023	3.0
Pablo arrives at the hospital to find out how Dulce is, Manuela informs him that she has had a crisis and has the same chance of being saved or dying. Pablo complains to Manuela for not telling him that she had already found Dulce and that she could be his son, Manuela tries to justify herself. Manuela confesses to her mother that her abuser is very close to her since she received an intimidating phone call and suspects that he is the one who hurt Dulce. Paloma confirms that Franco is who she wants to be with. Manuela discovers that her abuser has been released.
57	"Sinceramente, dudo que sobreviva"	12 September 2023	3.1
Carmina assures Damián that she and Pablo are only ashamed to see him transformed into a woman, so she forbids him to go near her family. Amanda comments to Manuela that a blonde woman was taking care of Dulce, Manuela asks for more details and suspects that it could be Carmina. Leandro makes Pablo feel bad for rejecting his daughter, Manuela asks him not to jump to conclusions. Pablo arrives at the hospital ready to be reunited with Dulce, but when Manuela enters her room she discovers she is not there. Walter suffers a car accident.
58	"No me voy a poder seguir escondiendo de él"	13 September 2023	2.8
Paloma tells Tolita that she is the only one to blame for Walter's accident because she pressured him to come to her house. Dulce reveals to Manuela that one of the reasons she kept her secret was because of her father's rejection and she does not feel ready to see him again. Leandro assures Amanda that Martín means nothing in his life and if he sought her out it was not to reconcile but to help him get Julieta back. Paloma asks Walter to fight for his life; however, he dies. Dulce agrees to see her father since she can no longer avoid him.
59	"Solo quiero que me respetes"	14 September 2023	2.7
Pablo tries to convince Dulce to reverse her decision to become female, she asks for respect and assures him that it is best if they never see each other again. Pablo suspects that Nora Pardo is threatening Dulce, she reveals that Nora died before she disappeared. Detective Suárez confesses to Pablo that Carmina has been investigating Damián's whereabouts behind his back, but is willing to reveal more secrets in exchange for money. Brissa Portugal reveals to Julieta that Ángeles never had children, much less married.
60	"Mi mamá no es hija de quien todos creen"	15 September 2023	2.0
Paloma reveals to Walter's parents that she felt nothing for him and the day the accident happened she was willing to tell him the truth, they call her a murderer. Pablo confronts Carmina when he discovers that she used his son Pablito's illness to keep him, and confirms that Damián never wanted to hurt his brother as she claimed. Julieta questions her mother and grandmother about her grandfather's identity, they avoid talking about him and argue that it is a painful subject. Dulce suspects that the man who hurt her is the same one who is threatening Genaro, Manuela asks her to reveal the name.
61	"Eres estéril"	18 September 2023	2.7
Adela and Octavio learn that Paloma is helping Walter's parents financially and decide to confront them. Leandro informs Carmina of the plans that Manuela and Pablo have. Leandro contacts a journalist to provide him with all the information he knows about Ángeles and confirms with a publication that she did not want to have children. Manuela tries to convince Dulce to denounce her aggressor, she is afraid, but Pablo surprises her by assuring her that she is not alone. Brissa reveals that Ángeles is sterile.
62	"¿Vas abandonar a tus hijos?"	19 September 2023	2.9
Pablo tell Dulce that it is not the right time for her to reunite with her brother since he would not know how to explain to her that Damián is now female. Ángeles confesses to Manuela that she revealed her secret to Brissa. Adela and Octavio tell Paloma that they hope to one day become grandparents, but they clarify that they want healthy grandchildren. Julieta begins to reject the injection she took to have a better body and faints at school, Manuela and Pablo arrive to pick her up, but Leandro gets upset.
63	"Yo me puedo quedar a cuidarlas"	20 September 2023	2.9
Paloma reunites with Dulce and apologizes for not asking her what was wrong and gives the box she had hidden in the bathroom. Yaneli prevents Genaro from getting involved in another incident for wanting to defend her from her Edgar's harassment. Edgar reveals to Genaro that his sister is having a relationship with his nephew Axel. Upon learning that Julieta endangered her life by getting an injection at Susana's spa, Leandra closes the place to investigate the practices being performed. Paloma questions Franco about the idea of having children, he is not sure about taking the next step, but she makes it clear that she loves him unconditionally.
64	"Vivo con VIH"	21 September 2023	3.0
Susy tells her Mother that she stole some products from the spa to give them to her classmates and in this way be accepted, Susana recognizes that she has not been a good mother to her daughter. Paloma asks Franco for a proof of love, because with her, she wants to prove that the affection they have for each other is for life. Genaro arrives at Leandro's office to thank him for what he did for him when he was in jail and takes the opportunity to reveal the name of the criminals who threatened him while he was in prison. Dulce reveals to Pablo that it was Carmina who dressed Pablito as a woman, Pablo asks her to move in with him to understand her transition, but she refuses.
65	"Nunca me imaginé que fueras así de ardiente"	22 September 2023	2.8
Pablo arrives at the hospital and finds Leandro taking care of Pablito and confronts him. Yaneli manages to convince all the women who were Edgar's victims to record their testimony so that pressure can be exerted and he can be imprisoned. Leandro wants to continue with his plan of taking his sons away from Lorena. Pablo invites Manuela to dinner to talk about their relationships and they give in to passion; however, the moment is overshadowed when Manuela receives intimidating messages.
66	"Espero no te hayas olvidado de mí"	25 September 2023	2.8
Manuela, feeling vulnerable, decides to protect herself with Julieta, Pablo recommends her to denounce the man who is harassing her. Pablito is surprised by the visit of his sister Dulce. Carmina lashes out against Dulce with transphobic comments, Pablito comes to her defense and puts a stop to his mother. Genaro arrives at the Atenea center ready to see Dulce again, they embrace and he assures her that he is sorry for what happened, she learns that Leandro got him out of jail and asks he not to see her anymore.
67	"¡El agresor es Nicolás!"	26 September 2023	3.0
Liberto returns to Manuela's life willing to make her pay for the crime she committed, Manuela blames him for being Dulce's alleged aggressor. Manuela questions Leandro for being Carmina's lawyer, he thinks she is jealous and prefers to play the victim to kick her out of his office. Paloma puts a stop to her parents when she realizes that they have not changed and still do not accept her relationship with Franco, so she tells them that they have already started living together. After her reunion with Amanda, Dulce reveals that the man who hurt her is Nicolás, her daughter Tamara's husband.
68	"Pagar las culpas de otros"	27 September 2023	2.9
Dulce reveals to Amanda that she had a relationship with Tamara's husband, but everything changed when Nicolás began to assault her to the point of threatening to kill her. Paloma assures Franco that she is willing to give herself to him because he is the man of her life. Leandro begs Manuela to tell him if she suspects someone who wants to harm her. Dulce remembers that Nora Pardo was Leandro's lover when he helped her get a job at Amanda's boutique.
69	"Van a pagar por sus errores"	28 September 2023	3.0
Dulce tells Pablo how her friendship with Nora Pardo was, but blames herself for not being there for her when she discovered she was attacked by her boyfriend. Leandro threatens Dulce with hurting her and someone in her family if she dares to reveal the whole truth. Pablito reminds Carmina that she had dressed him as a woman to play a joke on Damián, she denies it and demands that he never mention her brother's name in the house again. Cecilia tries to seduce Franco, but he doesn't fall for her provocations and admits that it was she who infected him with HIV when he became her lover.
70	"¡Es una asesina!"	29 September 2023	2.7
Yaneli defends herself from Edgar's attacks and manages to flee from her house to ask for help, the police manage to arrest him. Manuela discovers that Leandro was the one who orchestrated Julieta's destruction of the school's laboratory, so she decides to confront him. Leandro learns that Soledad Mendoza orphaned a teenager named Violeta and thinks she could be Manuela. Carmina blames Dulce for being responsible for her mother's death, Dulce slaps her.
71	"¡Yo lo maté!"	2 October 2023	3.0
Liberto reveals to Leandro that Manuela is his father's murderer and assures him that Violeta was an easy young woman. Fidelia returns to Manuela's life ready to remind her of her guilt and take revenge for having destroyed her family. Manuela confesses to Ángeles that Fidelia and Liberto are driving her to reveal that she is Rosendo's murderer. Frightened of what might happen, Manuela remembers the day she took Rosendo's life. Franco reveals to Paloma that Cecilia was the one who transmitted the HIV virus to him.
72	"Tu padre abusaba de mí"	3 October 2023	2.8
Leandro informs Carmina that he will file a complaint for injuries against Pablo and assures her that this will be a good reason to remove him from Pablito's custody. Leandro proposes Genaro to work for him, although he does not define what his duties will be, he assures Irineo that he will be in charge of the dirty work. Liberto swears to Manuela that he is ready to take revenge on her, since it was her fault that he lost his father and prevented him from achieving professional fulfillment after the accident that caused him an arm injury. Carmina asks Manuela to stay away from Pablo and only then will she withdraw the lawsuit she filed to take custody of Pablito.
73	"Se están vengando de mí"	4 October 2023	2.7
Joel hits Franco when he discovers that he was Cecilia's lover, Franco apologizes for betraying him and Cecilia confesses that she has HIV. Amanda tells Tamara that she visited Nicolás in jail and revealed that he was set up, Tamara rejects his argument. Amanda asks Dulce if it was Nicolás who told her she needed someone in her boutique, Dulce assures her that it was Nora Pardo who recommended the job. Manuela discovers that her mother was kidnapped, Leandro, seeing her distressed, supports her and she reveals that years ago she murdered a man.
74	"Solo confío en ti Dulce"	5 October 2023	3.1
Leandro begins to move his contacts to find Ángeles, but in reality he is only buying time for Liberto and Fidelia to do their job. Dulce wants to know where Nora Pardo's body is so she can say goodbye to her, Irineo advises her to forget about her since she was run over and nobody claimed her body. Yaneli and Axel have their first time. Dulce remembers that Nora revealed to her that she was afraid; however, she never knew what was really going on with her friend.
75	"¿Qué tiene que ver Leandro en todo esto?"	6 October 2023	3.0
Manuela reveals to Pablo that her mother was imprisoned for Rosendo's death; however, Liberto killed her out of revenge and that is how she arrived with Ángeles. After learning Manuela's story, Pablo asks her for time to assimilate her past. Leandro celebrates that he will soon have custody of Julieta. Seeing Franco unconscious, Adela and Octavio take him to the hospital where he is stabilized. Genaro begins to work for Leandro. Amanda investigates Nora Pardo's whereabouts since she does not believe that she has claimed Brayan's body, as she supposedly died before Dulce's disappearance and fears that Leandro may be involved in the case.
76	"Ahora soy el patrón"	9 October 2023	3.0
Leandro blackmails Manuela with putting her in jail if she refuses to go on a trip with him and Julieta, since he could use the evidence that Liberto and Fidelia have to send her to jail. After learning of her brother's diagnosis, Dulce wants to undergo a compatibility test to donate her kidney, but Carmina refuses. Leandro confirms to his mom that he is now Genaro's boss, Amanda remembers Genaro's words and confirms the person who hurt him in prison. Nancy tells Manuela that Carmina made an attempt on her own son's life with the intention of keeping Pablo close to her.
77	"Pase lo que pase, vence el miedo"	10 October 2023	3.1
Amanda asks Andrea to help her with some paperwork to open a business, but when Andrea learns that she is Leandro's mother, she asks her to leave. Manuela tells Pablo that Carmina caused Pablito's health to worsen. Leandro asks Fidelia to give him the photos that Liberto took of Julieta. Julieta tells her mother that she met a boy on the internet to whom she has been sending pictures, Manuela confirms that Kiro is actually Liberto. Dulce reveals that Nicolás was not the person who deprived her of her freedom.
78	"¡Me voy a entregar a las autoridades!"	11 October 2023	2.9
Leandro assures that Dulce's statement is wrong due to her emotional instability and makes it clear that her identity does not exist since she is still legally Damián. Carmina and Leandro are surprised by Amanda while kissing. Fidelia asks Liberto to ruin the trip Leandro has planned with Manuela and Julieta. Leandro, knowing that Dulce can testify against him, decides to kill her and visits her in the hospital to give her a lethal injection.
79	"El hombre que me quiso matar es Leandro"	12 October 2023	3.0
Dulce suffers a crisis and Pablo believes that Carmina provoked it. Julieta manages to escape from Fidelia, Franco sees that she is in danger and takes her to Paloma's house. Julieta confesses to her mom that she is disappointed in her father because she has confirmed that he is not the good man she was led to believe. Dulce reveals to Pablo that the man who made her disappear and threatened to harm her family is Leandro. Fidelia accepts that she murdered Rosendo because she could not stand that he abandoned her and Liberto, so she takes Julieta hostage and threatens to shoot her, Manuela and Leandro try to save her, but the gun goes off.
80	"Eso se llama culpa"	13 October 2023	3.3
Dulce tells Paloma that Leandro used Nora to extort the enemies of his clients, but before dying Nora assured her that she was being threatened and there was proof. Dulce confesses that the night she disappeared she was going to denounce Leandro, but he kidnapped her so that she would reveal the place where Nora kept the evidence, but when he did not get what he was looking for, he beat her. Amanda presents the evidence so that Leandro can be arrested; he, feeling betrayed by his own mother, humiliates her. Pablo reminds Manuela of his great love for her and she manages to wake up from her coma.

== Music ==
Vencer la culpa (Music from the Original TV Series)

Soundtrack album by Various artists
- Released: 23 June 2023
- Length: 19:42
- Label: Moon Music Records

Vencer la culpa (Music from the Original TV Series) is the soundtrack to the series. It was released by Moon Music Records on 23 June 2023.

No.	Title	Writer(s)	Performer(s)	Length
1.	"Vencer la culpa (Entrada)"	Mirley Cauich, Daniela Martínez Treviño, and Natalia Velasco Alanís	Daniela Romo, Dulce, Fanny Lu, and Paty Cantú	2:26
2.	"Casi una vida"	Belu Guglie and Natáliyah Bravo	Daniela Romo	3:14
3.	"La otra orilla"	Isabella Gaxiola	Dulce	3:52
4.	"Corazón ligero"	Cecy Leos and Nath Velasco	Fanny Lu	3:06
5.	"Sin mirar atrás"	Nayeli Stanfield and Estefanía Martínez Riojas	Griss Romero	3:28
6.	"Vencer la culpa (Salida)"	Carol Villagrán	Carol Villagrán, Nay Stanfield, Belu Guglié, and Daniela Treviño	3:34
Total length:				19:42
