= Vencer (franchise) =

Mexican television series

Vencer franchise
- Created by: Rosy Ocampo
- Original work: Vencer el miedo
- Owner: TelevisaUnivision

Films and television
- Television series: Vencer el miedo; Vencer el desamor; Vencer el pasado; Vencer la ausencia; Vencer la culpa

Vencer (English: Overcoming) is media franchise of Mexican television series created by Rosy Ocampo, produced by TelevisaUnivision, and broadcast on Las Estrellas. Each series revolves around four women of different ages and touches on different issues inherent to women, such as gender violence, teenage pregnancy, and cyberbullying.

== Overview ==
Series	Season	Episodes	Originally released	
Series	Season	Episodes	First released	Last released
Vencer el miedo	1	47	20 January 2020	22 March 2020
Vencer el desamor	1	93	12 October 2020	19 February 2021
Vencer el pasado	1	85	12 July 2021	5 November 2021
Vencer la ausencia	1	80	18 July 2022	4 November 2022
Vencer la culpa	1	80	26 June 2023	13 October 2023

=== Vencer el miedo ===
Vencer el miedo follows four women from the same family intertwined with social issues such as teenage pregnancy, sexual harassment and gender inequality.

=== Vencer el desamor ===
Vencer el desamor follows four women with nothing in common that are forced to live under the same roof, although it is complicated at first, sisterhood and solidarity will prevail when they realize that they all share the experience of heartbreak.

=== Vencer el pasado ===
Vencer el pasado follows four women from different social classes who, due to different circumstances, become victims of cyberbullying and must overcome it in order to move forward with their lives.

=== Vencer la ausencia ===
Vencer la ausencia tells the story of four close-knit women who share the experience of tragic losses.

=== Vencer la culpa ===
Vencer la culpa follows four women who come together to face the burden of their own guilt.

== Cast ==
List indicators
- A green cell indicates the actor as a main cast member.
- A red cell indicates the actor as a recurring cast member.
- A light blue cell indicates the actor as a guest cast member.
- A grey cell indicates the actor has not participated in the respective series.

Portrayer	Capacity and character per series				
Portrayer	Vencer el miedo	Vencer el desamor	Vencer el pasado	Vencer la ausencia	Vencer la culpa
Paulina Goto	Marcela Durán	Marcela Durán		Marcela Durán	
Arcelia Ramírez	Inés Durán		Inés Durán		
Jade Fraser	Cristina Durán		Cristina Durán		
Emilia Berjón	Areli Durán				
Danilo Carrera	Omar Cifuentes			Ángel Funes	
Emmanuel Palomares	Rommel Guajardo	Gael Falcón Albarrán Rommel Guajardo			
Alberto Estrella	Vicente Durán				
Beatriz Moreno	Doña Efigenia "Efi" Cruz				Doña Efigenia "Efi" Cruz
Carlos Bonavides	Father Antero				
Jonathan Becerra	El Yeison	El Yeison			
Beng Zeng	Marco Arizpe "La Liendre"	Marco Arizpe "La Liendre"			Marco Arizpe "La Liendre"
Ariane Pellicer	Guadalupe "Lupe" Guajardo				
Bárbara Falconi	Susana López	Cassandra Ríos			
Daniela Romo	Bárbara Albarrán de Falcón	Bárbara Albarrán de Falcón			
Claudia Álvarez		Ariadna López Hernández	Ariadna López Hernández		
Julia Urbini		Dafne Falcón Miranda			
Valentina Buzzurro		Gemma Corona	Gemma Corona		
David Zepeda		Álvaro Falcón Albarrán		Jerónimo Garrido	
Altair Jarabo		Olga Collado			
Juan Diego Covarrubias		Eduardo Falcón Albarrán			
Andrés Vásquez		Dimitri "Dimi"	Dimitri "Dimi"	Iván Camargo	
Leonardo Daniel		Lino Ferrer (Eps 43-49)	Lisandro Mascaró		
Antonio Treviño		Lino Ferrer (Eps 52-93)			
Angelique Boyer			Renata Sánchez Vidal	Renata Sánchez Vidal	
Erika Buenfil			Carmen Medina		
Arantza Ruiz			Mariluz Blanco		
Ana Paula Martínez			Danna Cruz Medina		
Sebastián Rulli			Mauro Álvarez		
Africa Zavala			Fabiola Mascaró		
Manuel "Flaco" Ibáñez			Camilo Sánchez		
Leticia Perdigón			Sonia Vidal		
Ferdinando Valencia			Javier Mascaró		
Horacio Pancheri			Alonso Cancino		
Miguel Martínez			Erik Sánchez Vidal		
José Remis			Sammy	Sammy	
María Perroni Garza			Rita Lozano	Rayo Rojo	Rayo Rojo
Ariadne Díaz				Julia Miranda	Julia Miranda
Mayrín Villanueva				Esther Noriega	
Alejandra Barros				Celeste Machado	
Alexis Ayala				Braulio Dueñas	
Jesús Ochoa				Rodolfo Miranda	
Mariana Garza				Margarita Rojo	
Claudia Martín					Paloma
Gabriela de la Garza					Manuela
María Sorté					Amanda
Romina Poza					Yaneli

== Production ==
Filming of Vencer el miedo began on 2 July 2019. Vencer el desamor was announced in February 2020, with filming taking place from 30 June 2020 to 16 December 2020. Vencer el pasado was announced on 12 January 2021, with filming taking place from 8 April 2021 to 28 August 2021. Vencer la ausencia was announced on 1 November 2021, with filming beginning in April 2022. In October 2022, Rosy Ocampo announced that she was developing a fifth series for the franchise. On 4 November 2022, it was announced that Vencer la culpa would be the title of the fifth series. The series premiered on 26 June 2023.
