= Marcos Montero =

Bolivian journalist, TV host, and radio host (1970–2020)

Marcos Raúl Montero Álvarez (19 September 1970 – 30 September 2020) was a Bolivian journalist, television presenter, and radio host.

== Biography ==
Marcos Montero was born on 19 September 1970, in Santa Cruz de la Sierra, Bolivia. He began his school studies in 1970, leaving high school in his hometown in 1981. He started working as radio host at Radio Antena Uno in Santa Cruz.

He started studying communication at the Bolivian Catholic University, qualifying as professional journalist; he completed a postgraduate course in journalism at the Universidad Privada Tecnológica de Santa Cruz (UTEPSA).

=== Red Uno (1997–2020) ===
In 1997 Montero started working at Red UNO, initially as a reporter and later as television presenter, then as head of content and finally as head of National press of Red UNO.

On 17 December 2010, he was awarded the BISA Prize for Journalism.

On 22 April 2017, he was invited by Promociones Gloria to be part of the jury in the Miss Santa Cruz 2017.

On 29 April 2020, he left the TV channel after working there for 23 years.

=== Illness and death ===
On 25 May 2020, it was revealed that Montero had tested positive for COVID-19 during the pandemic in Bolivia, and that he had been hospitalized in intensive care.

As he was in serious condition, his fellow journalists from his television channel requested help from the entire country to get somebody who had recovered from Covid to donate their plasma.

After being hospitalized for over four months, Montero died at 01:00 on 30 September 2020, aged 50.
