= Vencer el miedo =

Mexican telenovela

- Genre: Telenovela
- Created by: Pedro Armando Rodríguez; Claudia Velazco
- Written by: Humberto Robles; Alejandra Romero Meza; Gerardo Pérez Zermeño
- Directed by: Benjamín Cann; Fernando Nesme
- Creative director: Diego Lascuráin
- Starring: Paulina Goto; Danilo Carrera; Emmanuel Palomares; Arcelia Ramírez; Alberto Estrella; Jade Fraser
- Theme music composer: Paulina Gómez Torres; Pablo Dazán; Marcela de la Garza
- Opening theme: "Rompe" by Paulina Goto
- Composer: Alfonso Matehuala
- Country of origin: Mexico
- Original language: Spanish
- No. of seasons: 1
- No. of episodes: 47

Production
- Executive producer: Rosy Ocampo
- Producer: Silvia Cano
- Production locations: Mexico City, Mexico
- Cinematography: Manuel Barajas; Alejandro Frutos Maza; Diego Tenorio
- Editors: Susana Valencia; Ioma Carmona; Mauricio Cortés; Pablo Peralta
- Camera setup: Multi-camera
- Production companies: Televisa; Population Media Center

Original release
- Network: Las Estrellas
- Release: 20 January – 22 March 2020

Related
- Vencer franchise

Vencer el miedo (English: Overcoming Fear) formerly known as Vencer el silencio, is a Mexican telenovela produced by Rosy Ocampo for Televisa. The series is a co-production between Televisa and Population Media Center. Production began on 2 July 2019 in Mexico City. The series is the first production of the "Vencer" franchise.

The series is starring an ensemble cast headed by Paulina Goto, Danilo Carrera, Emmanuel Palomares, Arcelia Ramírez, Alberto Estrella, and Jade Fraser.

== Plot ==
Vencer el miedo revolves around the stories of four women of different ages, whose lives revolve around social and family issues such as teenage pregnancy, sexual harassment and gender violence.

== Cast ==
=== Main ===
- Paulina Goto as Marcela Durán
- Danilo Carrera as Omar Cifuentes
- Emmanuel Palomares as Rommel Guajardo
- Arcelia Ramírez as Inés Durán
- Alberto Estrella as Vicente Durán
- Jade Fraser as Cristina Durán
- Axel Ricco as Lorenzo Bracho
- Alejandro Ávila as David Cifuentes
- Pablo Valentín as Tulio Menéndez
- Marcelo Córdoba as Rubén Oliva
- Beatriz Moreno as Doña Efigenia "Efi" Cruz
- Carlos Bonavides as Father Antero
- Gabriela Carrillo as Maru Mendoza
- Michelle González as Elvira Tinoco
- Geraldine Galván as Jaqueline Montes
- Nicole Vale as Rebeca Rodríguez
- Enrique Montaño as Rafael Conti
- Karla Esquivel as Silvia Muñoz
- Yurem Rojas as Julio Ibarra "Sancho Clós"
- Luis Ceballos as Luis Ceballos
- Jonathan Becerra as El Yeison
- Beng Zeng as Marco Arizpe "La Liendre"
- Manuel Calderón as Gamaliel Robles "El Manchado"
- Eduardo Fernán as Víctor Pérez "El Huesos"
- Adanely Núñez as Mabel Garza de Cifuentes
- Pedro de Tavira as Eulalio Mitre
- Héctor Cruz Lara as Iván Eusebio
- Benjamín Islas
- Alessio Valentini as Yahir Luna
- Hanssel Casillas as Greñas Simón Rocha
- Valeria Castillo as Dina Álvarez
- Emilia Berjón as Areli Durán
- Margarita Magaña as Magda
- Ariane Pellicer as Lupe
- Moisés Arizmendi as Fabián
- Arlette Pacheco as Carmela
- César Évora as Horacio Cifuentes

=== Guest stars ===
- Adalberto Parra as Don Neto
- Juan Carlos Barreto as Agustín
- Alejandra Jurado as Martina

== Ratings ==
Viewership and ratings per season of Vencer el miedo
Season	Timeslot (CT)	Episodes	First aired		Last aired		Avg. viewers (millions)
Season	Timeslot (CT)	Episodes	Date	Viewers (millions)	Date	Viewers (millions)	Avg. viewers (millions)
1	Mon–Fri 6:30pm	46	20 January 2020	3.1	22 March 2020	3.8	3.22

== Episodes ==
No.	Title	Original release date	México viewers (millions)
1	"¿Somos libres desde que nacemos?"	20 January 2020 (Note: Premiered early online through Las Estrellas website on 17 January 2020.)	3.1
Rommel wants to make love with Marcela, but she refuses, so he cheats on her with Rebeca. Cristina suffers sexual harassment in the competition.
2	"Lo justo es que pagues por lo que hiciste"	21 January 2020	3.1
Marcela is arrested for car theft and sentenced to 3 years in prison. Magda suffers a heart attack and Cristina an accident in the pool.
3	"La justicia no siempre es justa"	22 January 2020	3.2
Marcela makes a deal with Horacio to find the murderers of his son and to be able to return home, where Vicente tells her to leave. Lorenzo and Elvira are engaged.
4	"Ni por ti ni por nadie me van a volver a encerrar"	23 January 2020	3.2
Marcela steals a car to show Rommel her loyalty. Omar takes the identity of El Beto and tries to enter "Los Peñones".
5	"Siempre hay algo que ocultar"	24 January 2020	3.3
Rommel does not allow Marcela to enter "Los Peñones". Cristina remembers the rape she suffered and Inés decides to recover the woman she once was.
6	"El poder de la sonrisa"	27 January 2020	3.2
Omar falls into drugs after the death of his father and infiltrates in "La Dosis". Marcela believes she has found the place where Fabián Cifuentes was kidnapped.
7	"La oveja más negra de la familia"	28 January 2020	3.1
Beto is accepted in "La Dosis" and they defend him from "Los Peñones". Vicente explodes upon learning that a male doctor checked Inés.
8	"Todos queremos pertenecer a un grupo"	29 January 2020	3.0
Marcela and Liendre begin their plan against the Beltrán. Inés ruins Vicente's massage and Horacio tells Omar to leave his house.
9	"No hagas cosas buenas que parezcan malas"	30 January 2020	3.0
Marcela extorts the Beltrán and asked Susana for help to pretend the delivery of the Liendre. Omar denounces Marcela.
10	"Marcela ya es de los Peñones"	31 January 2020	3.1
Los Peñones save Marcela and Liendre from the Beltrán. She and Rommel kiss. Areli and Yahir are already dating.
11	"¿Cómo te suena entrar a la Dosis?"	3 February 2020	2.9
Omar proposes Marcela to be part of La Dosis and she accepts. Cristina agrees to take a walk with her boss.
12	"La vida siempre nos presenta otros planes"	4 February 2020	3.2
Jason agrees to give Marcela the merchandise and asks Beto to accompany her to deliver it. Lorenzo prohibits Areli from dating Yahir and Inés must be operated immediately.
13	"Marcela acepta ser novia de Rommel"	5 February 2020	3.3
Rommel prepares a romantic dinner for Marcela, in which he proposes to be a couple again and live together. Inés is operated urgently and Mitre threatens Cristina.
14	"Ya sé quién mató a Fabián Cifuentes"	6 February 2020	3.1
Marcela is sure Rommel was Fabian's killer. Cristina discovers Mitre's lie, Areli and Dina are going to buy condoms.
15	"La honestidad es un arma de doble filo"	7 February 2020	3.2
"El Beto" flirts with Marcela and they kiss. Cristina goes to dinner with Rubén and he declares his feelings for her. Areli and Yahir go out to the movies.
16	"Marcela siente algo por ‘El Beto’"	10 February 2020	3.1
Marcela remembers the kiss she gave “Beto” and confesses that she agreed with Horacio Cifuentes to find Fabián's killer. Rubén harasses Cristina.
17	"Cristina denuncia a Rubén"	11 February 2020	2.9
Cristina and Marcela go to the delegation to report Rubén. Lorenzo puts a stop to Elvira, but she gives him unexpected news.
18	"Todos necesitamos un cómplice"	12 February 2020	2.8
Cristina apologizes to Rubén and agrees to go to his house, but the plan that she and Marcela had tended to him gets out of their hands.
19	"Las corazonadas no siempre son confiables"	13 February 2020	3.2
Marcela and Cristina find a new clue to the murder of Fabián and Inés discover Vicente's infidelity.
20	"Marcela termina con Rommel"	14 February 2020	2.7
Marcela tells Rommel that their relationship is over. Horacio is very sick and Inés makes a strong decision about her marriage.
21	"Marcela descubre el secreto del Beto"	17 February 2020	3.2
Marcela finds out about the true identity of Beto. The Dosis and the Peñones face with tragic consequences. Inés asks Vicente for a divorce.
22	"Todo lo que empieza tiene que acabar"	18 February 2020	3.3
Marcela despises Omar for deceiving her. Vicente refuses to give Inés a divorce and Rommel pretends to end the Peñones.
23	"¿Justicia o venganza?"	19 February 2020	3.3
Omar swears to his grandfather to find the murderer of his father. Rommel proposes to Marcela to open her own business.
24	"El que persevera alcanza"	20 February 2020	3.2
Rommel swears to Marcela that everything he does is for love. Areli ends with Yahir. Omar asks to reopen his father's case.
25	"Vencer el silencio"	21 February 2020	3.2
Cristina confesses to her parents and Marcela that she was a victim of sexual abuse. Areli and Yahir reconcile.
26	"El fin justifica los medios"	24 February 2020	3.3
Elvira loses the baby she is expecting and takes advantage of the news to get Areli out of the house. The inhabitants of the Peñón go against Marcela.
27	"Inés rechaza divorciarse de Vicente"	25 February 2020	2.9
Inés does not sign the divorce papers. Jason threatens Sancho Clós and Omar tries to help Yahir of La Dosis.
28	"¿Existe el justo castigo?"	26 February 2020	3.0
While La Dosis hit "Beto" for being a traitor, Marcela is arrested for painting the walls of El Peñon.
29	"¿Huir es la mejor salida?"	27 February 2020	3.3
Areli and Yahir decide to escape together and Rommel saves ‘Beto’ from La Dosis.
30	"Los pequeños detalles revelan los secretos más oscuros"	28 February 2020	2.9
Omar makes a discovery that would lead him to know who killed his father. Lorenzo blames Marcela for Areli escaping with Yahir.
31	"Dar la cara"	2 March 2020	3.0
Horacio asks to speak to Marcela. Silvia slapped Cristina when she knew she was Rafael's lover. Areli and Yahir are about to have their first time.
32	"Nuestra esencia siempre va a estar ahí"	3 March 2020	3.4
Omar suffers from the death of his grandfather. Vicente kicks out Cristina from the house and Areli doesn't want to know more about Yahir.
33	"Deja que todo fluya"	4 March 2020	3.3
Marcela and Rommel are about to make love. Inés feels sick and Yahir is detained by the police.
34	"Lo inesperado siempre da miedo"	5 March 2020	3.0
Marcela thinks she is pregnant. Mitre pays for all the damage he has done and Cristina leaves the house.
35	"El tiempo nos hace sentirnos diferentes"	6 March 2020	3.4
Marcela gets the pregnancy test. Lorenzo believes that Areli expects a baby and Omar believes that Rommel had to do with his father's death.
36	"Patrones difíciles de romper"	9 March 2020	3.5
Inés knocks Vicente unconscious after hitting her. Cristina reconciles with Rafa and Omar spies on Tulio.
37	"Dejarse llevar por la pasión"	10 March 2020	3.1
Marcela has chlamydia, but Rommel doesn't react well to the news. Inés goes to a support group and Cristina relives the rape she suffered.
38	"Cadenas que no pueden romperse"	11 March 2020	3.1
Uriel wants revenge on Yahir, so he tries to kidnap Areli; Yahir defends her. Inés definitely kicks Vicente out of the house.
39	"El poder del rumor"	12 March 2020	3.4
Omar is chased by the residents of the Peñon to lynch him, but Marcela will defend him. Rommel tries to abuse Marcela, but Inés puts him in his place.
40	"Descubrir la dura realidad"	13 March 2020	3.4
Omar already knows who killed his father. Vicente serenades Inés. Dina is kicked out of her home.
41	"La culpa"	16 March 2020	3.6
Omar agrees not to confess the truth for Bruno's sake. Cristina declares in the trial against Rubén, Inés and Agustín meet again.
42	"Lo mejor es ir despacio"	17 March 2020	3.6
Omar and Marcela find Rommel's bullet ammunition. Lorenzo asks Elvira for a divorce and apologizes to Yahir. Rafa breaks up with Cristina.
43	"El pasado nunca se va"	18 March 2020	3.6
Omar learns the truth about his mother. Lorenzo kicks out Elvira from the house. Marcela discovers that Rebeca also has chlamydia.
44	"La verdad nos hará libres"	19 March 2020	3.8
Omar is reunited with his mother. Lupe tells Marcela about the dirty businesses of Rommel, Tulio and one of the Cifuentes.
45	"El orden de los recuerdos no altera el olvido"	20 March 2020	4.0
David tells Omar the truth about his father's death, while Marcela secretly records them.
46	"Muchos finales son el comienzo de nuevas historias"	22 March 2020	3.8
47	"Esta historia no termina"	22 March 2020	3.8
Rommel kidnaps Marcela, but Omar will do everything to save her. Inés asks Agustín not to look for her anymore and Elvira makes peace with Areli. Marcela discovers who leaves her messages on the Peñon. Inés visits Vicente to let him know that she will put the house up for sale. Rommel ends up in prison, Areli and Yahir get back together.

== Awards and nominations ==
Year	Award	Category	Nominated	Result
2020	TVyNovelas Awards	Best Telenovela of the Year	Rosy Ocampo	Nominated
2020	TVyNovelas Awards	Best Actress	Paulina Goto	Nominated
2020	TVyNovelas Awards	Best Actor	Danilo Carrera	Nominated
2020	TVyNovelas Awards	Best Antagonist Actress	Nicole Vale	Nominated
2020	TVyNovelas Awards	Best Antagonist Actor	Emmanuel Palomares	Nominated
2020	TVyNovelas Awards	Best Leading Actress	Arcelia Ramírez	Won
2020	TVyNovelas Awards	Best Leading Actor	Alberto Estrella	Won
2020	TVyNovelas Awards	Best Co-lead Actress	Jade Fraser	Won
2020	TVyNovelas Awards	Best Co-lead Actor	Axel Ricco	Nominated
2020	TVyNovelas Awards	Best Direction	Benjamín Cann and Fernando Nesme	Nominated
2020	TVyNovelas Awards	Best Direction of the Cameras	Manuel Barajas, Alejandro Frutos and Diego Tenorio	Nominated
2020	TVyNovelas Awards	Best Original Story or Adaptation	Pedro Rodríguez, Claudia Velazco, Humberto Robles, Alejandra Romero, Gerardo Zermeño and Gustavo Bracco	Nominated
2020	TVyNovelas Awards	Best Musical Theme	"Rompe" (Paulina Goto)	Won
