= List of awards and nominations received by Daniela Romo =

Daniela Romo awards and nominations
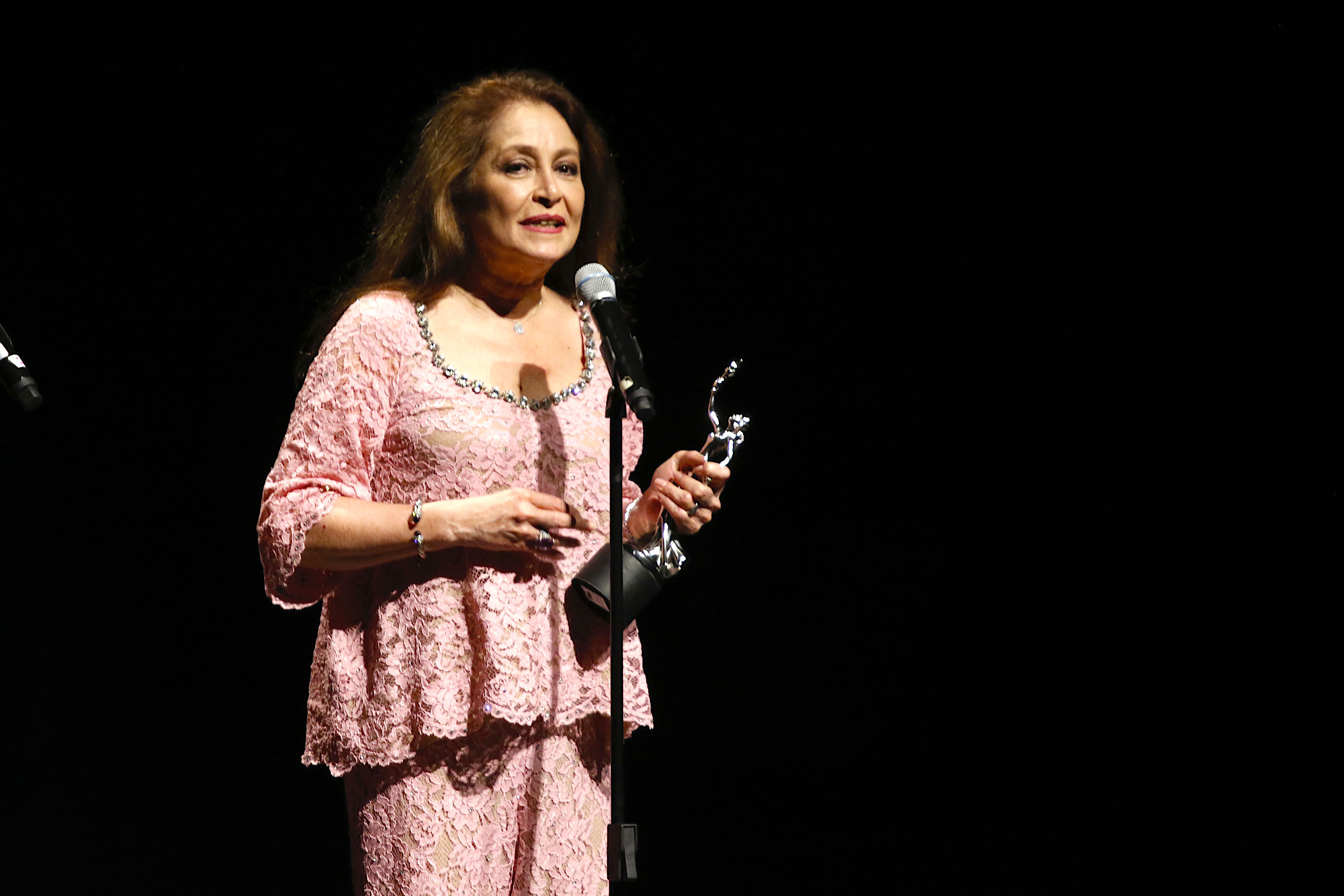
- Daniela Romo accepting an award from ACPT in 2019
Awards and nominations
| Award | Wins | Nominations |
| Ariel Award | 0 | 1 |
| Billboard Number One Awards | 1 | 3 |
| Diosas de Plata | 3 | 3 |
| El Heraldo de México Awards | 4 | 5 |
| Grammy Awards | 0 | 1 |
| Latin Grammy Awards | 1 | 1 |
| Lo Nuestro Awards | 1 | 7 |
| National Association of Actors | 1 | 1 |
| Premios TVyNovelas | 6 | 13 |

Totals (Note: Certain award groups do not simply award one winner. They acknowledge several different recipients, have runners-up, and have third place. Since this is a specific recognition and is different from losing an award, runner-up mentions are considered wins in this award tally. For simplification and to avoid errors, each award in this list has been presumed to have had a prior nomination.)
- Wins: 57
- Nominations: 79

Daniela Romo is a Mexican singer-songwriter, actress and TV hostess. One of the best-selling Latin singers, she has achieved a number of nominations and awards since her rose to prominence in the 1980s.

She won one of her first major awards in her career as Best Revelation Singer in the El Heraldo de México Awards of 1984. Over the course of her career, she obtained various other awards and nominations from major ceremonies, including various Premios TVyNovelas and Bravo Awards, among others. She won an award from three nominations at the Billboard Number One Awards in 1987 with her song "De Mí Enamórate" as the Top Hot Latin Track. In 1992, she was nominated for a Grammy Awards in the category Best Latin Pop Album for Amada Más Que Nunca. She also obtained multiple Lo Nuestro Awards nominations, winning the Video of the Year for "Todo, Todo, Todo" the same year.

Daniela Romo's career has also been recognized by critic's associations such as National Association of Actors (ANSA), Association of Latin Entertainment Critics (ACE) and Mexican Film Journalists Association (PECIME). She won a Latin Grammy Lifetime Achievement Award in 2012.

== Awards and nominations ==
| Award/organization (Note: Charts are not included, unless they are explicitly described as "awards" or specific trophies are given.) | Year | Nominee/work | Category | Result | Ref. |
|---|---|---|---|---|---|
| 95.3 Radio Estation | 2023 | Daniela Romo | Career Achievement Award | Honoree | |
| Academia Mexicana del Humor | 1996 | Daniela Romo | Smile Award for Female Singer | Won | |
| ACE Awards (Argentina) | 1993 | Daniela Romo | Female Singer of the Year | Won | |
| Agrupación de Críticos y Periodistas de Teatro (ACPT) | 2000 | Daniela Romo (La Libélula) | Best Comedy Actress | Won | |
| Agrupación de Críticos y Periodistas de Teatro (ACPT) | 2004 | Daniela Romo (Cartas de Amor) | Dramatized Reading | Won | |
| Agrupación de Críticos y Periodistas de Teatro (ACPT) | 2007 | Daniela Romo (Victor/Victoria) | Best Actress in a Musical | Won | |
| Agrupación de Críticos y Periodistas de Teatro (ACPT) | 2018 | Daniela Romo (Hello, Dolly!) | Best Actress in a Musical | Nominated | |
| Agrupación de Críticos y Periodistas de Teatro (ACPT) | 2019 | Daniela Romo (Hello, Dolly!) | Best Actress in a Musical | Won | |
| Agrupación de Críticos y Periodistas de Teatro (ACPT) | 2024 | Cabaret | Best Musical | Won | |
| Ariel Award | 1980 | Daniela Romo (Te quiero) | Best Female Revelation | Nominated | |
| Association of Latin Entertainment Critics (Latin ACE) | 1988 | Daniela Romo | Best Female Artist | Won | |
| Association of Latin Entertainment Critics (Latin ACE) | 1990 | Daniela Romo | Best Female Artist | Won | |
| Association of Latin Entertainment Critics (Latin ACE) | 1991 | Daniela Romo | Female Figure of the Year | Won | |
| Association of Latin Entertainment Critics (Latin ACE) | 1991 | Daniela Romo | Composer of the Year | Won | |
| Association of Latin Entertainment Critics (Latin ACE) | 1992 | Daniela Romo | Most Outstanding Female Singer | Won | |
| Association of Latin Entertainment Critics (Latin ACE) | 1992 | Amada Más Que Nunca | Album of the Year | Won | |
| Association of Latin Entertainment Critics (Latin ACE) | 1992 | "Todo, Todo, Todo" | Video of the Year | Won | |
| Association of Latin Entertainment Critics (Latin ACE) | 1993 | Daniela Romo | Extraordinary ACE | Honoree | |
| Association of Latin Entertainment Critics (Latin ACE) | 1997 | Daniela Romo | ACE Honor Gallery / Permanent Star Awards | Inductee | |
| Asociación Internaticional de Periodistas de Espectáculos (AIPE) | 1997 | Daniela Romo | Special Award | Won | |
| Avon Crusade | 2012 | Daniela Romo | Special Recognition | Honoree | |
| Billboard Number One Awards (Note: Prior to the inauguration of the Billboard Music Awards in 1990, the magazine had the "Number One Awards" to honor the top-performing artists of the year on each of chart categories.) | 1987 | Daniela Romo | Top Pop Latin Artist | Nominated | |
| Billboard Number One Awards | 1987 | Mujer de todos, Mujer de nadie | Top Pop Latin Album | Nominated | |
| Billboard Number One Awards | 1987 | "De Mí Enamórate" | Top Hot Latin Track | Won | |
| Billboard Music Video Awards | 1990 | Daniela Romo | Best Female Latin Artist | Nominated | |
| Billboard Music Video Awards | 1991 | Daniela Romo | Best Female Latin Artist | Nominated | |
| Bravo Awards | 1988 | "De Mí Enamórate" | Best Song of the Year | Nominated | |
| Bravo Awards | 2002 | Daniela Romo (El manantial) | Best Antagonist Actress | Won | |
| Bravo Awards | 2006 | Daniela Romo (Alborada) | Best Antagonist Actress | Won | |
| Bravo Awards | 2013 | Daniela Romo | Best Actress | Won | |
| Bravo Awards | 2017 | Daniela Romo (El hotel de los secretos) | Best Character Actress | Won | |
| Brownsville Chamber of Commerce | 1992 | Daniela Romo | Mr. Amigo (Note: A collaborative effort by cities of Brownsvile, Texas, and Matamoros, Tamaulipas established in 1964 to honor Mexican figures in sports, politics, business, cultural and arts) | Honoree | |
| Brownsville Chamber of Commerce | 1993 | Daniela Romo | Mr. Amigo | Honoree | |
| Califa de Oro (Golden Caliph) | 2011 | Daniela Romo (Triunfo del amor) | Best Antagonist Actress | Won | |
| Círculo de Cronistas del Espectáculo, CIRCE (Peru) | 1985 | Daniela Romo | International Award | Won | |
| Diosas de Plata | 1980 | Daniela Romo (Te Quiero) | Best Femenine Revelation | Won | |
| Diosas de Plata | 1996 | Daniela Romo | Career Achievement Award | Honoree | |
| Diosas de Plata | 1998 | Daniela Romo | Special Distinction | Honoree | |
| El Heraldo de México Awards | 1984 | Daniela Romo | Best Revelation Singer | Won | |
| El Heraldo de México Awards | 1996 | Daniela Romo (Un Nuevo Amor) | Best Composer | Won | |
| El Heraldo de México Awards | 1997 | Daniela Romo | Singer of the Year | Won | |
| El Heraldo de México Awards | 2002 | Daniela Romo (El manantial) | Best Actress | Won | |
| El Heraldo de México Awards | 2003 | Daniela Romo (Las vías del amor) | Best Actress | Won | |
| Galardón a los Grandes | 1992 | Daniela Romo | 1992 winners | Won | |
| Grammy Awards | 1992 | Amada Más Que Nunca | Best Latin Pop Album | Nominated | |
| INTE Award | 2003 | Daniela Romo (El Manantial) | Supporting Actress of the Year | Won | |
| Jean Seguin's Diploma of Excellence | 2004 | Daniela Romo | Career Achievement Award | Honoree | |
| Latin Grammy Awards | 2012 | Daniela Romo | Lifetime Achievement Award | Honoree | |
| Lo Nuestro Awards | 1991 | Daniela Romo | Pop Female Artist of the Year | Nominated | |
| Lo Nuestro Awards | 1991 | Quiero Amanecer con Alguien | Pop/Balada Album of the Year | Nominated | |
| Lo Nuestro Awards | 1992 | "Todo, Todo, Todo" | Video of the Year | Won | |
| Lo Nuestro Awards | 1992 | Daniela Romo | Pop Female Artist of the Year | Nominated | |
| Lo Nuestro Awards | 1994 | Daniela Romo | Pop Female Artist of the Year | Nominated | |
| Lo Nuestro Awards | 1995 | "Qué Sabes Tú" | Video of the Year | Nominated | |
| Lo Nuestro Awards | 1997 | "Mátame" | Video of the Year | Nominated | |
| National Association of Actors (ANSA) | 2004 | Daniela Romo | Virginia Fabregas Medal: Career Achievement | Honoree | |
| Palmas de Oro (Golden Palm) | 2006 | Daniela Romo (Alborada) | Best Antagonist Actress | Won | |
| People en Español Awards | 2013 | Daniela Romo (La Tempestad) | Best Supporting Actress | Nominated | |
| Premio Aplauso | 1990 | Daniela Romo | Best Female Act | Won | |
| Paseo de las Luminarias | 1996 | Daniela Romo | Hall of Fame Inductee | Inductee | |
| Paseo de las Luminarias | 2004 | Daniela Romo | Luminaria de Oro (Gold Luminaires) | Gold | |
| Premios TVyNovelas | 1984 | Daniela Romo | Best Singer Revelation | Won | |
| Premios TVyNovelas | 1987 | Daniela Romo (El Camino Secreto) | Best Actress | Nominated | |
| Premios TVyNovelas | 1991 | Daniela Romo (Balada por un amor) | Best Actress | Nominated | |
| Premios TVyNovelas | 1991 | Daniela Romo | Most Outstanding Female Singer | Nominated | |
| Premios TVyNovelas | 2002 | Daniela Romo (El Manantial) | Best Leading Actress | Won | |
| Premios TVyNovelas | 2003 | Daniela Romo (Las vías del amor) | Best Leading Actress | Nominated | |
| Premios TVyNovelas | 2006 | Daniela Romo (Alborada) | Best Antagonist Actress | Won | |
| Premios TVyNovelas | 2006 | Daniela Romo | Artistic Career Award | Honoree | |
| Premios TVyNovelas | 2010 | Daniela Romo (Sortilegio) | Best Leading Actress | Won | |
| Premios TVyNovelas | 2012 | Daniela Romo (Triunfo del amor) | Best Antagonist Actress | Won | |
| Premios TVyNovelas | 2014 | Daniela Romo (La Tempestad) | Best Leading Actress | Nominated | |
| Premios TVyNovelas | 2017 | Daniela Romo (El hotel de los secretos) | Best Leading Actress | Nominated | |
| Premios TVyNovelas | 2018 | Daniela Romo (En tierras salvajes) | Best Leading Actress | Nominated | |
| Premios TVyNovelas (Colombia) | 2004 | Daniela Romo | Best International Artist | Won | |
| Sociedad de Autores y Compositores de México (SACM) | 2014 | Daniela Romo | Career Achievement Award | Honoree | |
| Teatro de la Ciudad | 2019 | Daniela Romo (Hello, Dolly!) | Best Actress — Musical Comedy | Won | |
| TV Adicto Golden Awards | 2021 | Daniela Romo (Vencer el desamor) | Best Leading Actress | Won | |
| Warner's (Mexico) | 2018 | Daniela Romo | Mi Super Power Award | Won | |

== Others ==
| Year | Description | Ref. |
|---|---|---|
| 2016 | Plaque of 200 shows (Annie) | |
| 2018 | Plaque of 200 shows (Privacidad) | |
| 2023 | Plaque of 100 shows (Cirque Música Querida) | |
