= En Vivo Desde el Teatro Alameda =

Studio album by Daniela Romo
- Released: 1998
- Recorded: 1998
- Genre: Pop
- Label: Melody Records
- Producer: Tina Galindo

Daniela Romo chronology
Un nuevo amor (1996)	En Vivo Desde el Teatro Alameda (1998)	Me Vuelves Loca (1999)

En Vivo Desde el Teatro Alameda (English Live from Alameda Theatre) is the 12th album by Mexican pop singer Daniela Romo, this is her first and only live album to date. This album was released on 1998 and it was produced by Tina Galindo.

== Track listing ==
Tracks:

=== Disc 1 ===
1. Una aventura
2. Que sabes tú - Franqueza - Voy - Si Dios me quita la vida
3. Quiero amanecer con alguien
4. Amada mas que nunca
5. Mulata
6. Yo no te pido la luna - Quiero saber - Poesías - Ese momento
7. Todo, todo, todo

=== Disc 2 ===
1. De mi enamórate
2. Un mundo raro -Mía- Cien años- Dame un poco de ti - Cheque en blanco - Abuso
3. Cuidado con los ladrones
4. Mátame
5. Que vengan los bomberos
