= Juan Pablo Esperanza, Amigo del Alma =

Single by Daniela Romo
- Released: 1999
- Recorded: 1999
- Genre: Pop
- Length: 3:17
- Label: Universal Music
- Producer(s): Bebu Silvetti; Tina Galindo

Thematic Albums singles chronology
"Los Cuates de Chabelo" (1999)	"Juan Pablo Esperanza, Amigo del Alma" (1999)

"Juan Pablo Esperanza, Amigo del Alma" (English "John Paul Hope, Friend of the Soul") is a single-EP by Mexican pop singer Daniela Romo. The single with just one song was recorded because of the visit of the Pope John Paul II to Mexico. The song was the official theme of Televisa written by Fernando Riba and Kiko Campos, produced by Bebu Silvetti and Tina Galindo. This was the "musical pray" of Mexico to the Pope.

Due to the religious success that surprised Daniela and producers, they wanted to include it in the album Me Vuelves Loca, but PolyGram was absorbed by Universal Music Group and the inclusion was canceled.

== Track listing ==
Track:

- "Juan Pablo Esperanza (Amigo del alma)" – 3:17
