= También Yo =

También Yo Te Pareces Mucho a Mí

Studio album by Daniela Romo
- Released: 1979
- Recorded: 1979
- Genre: Pop
- Label: Sony Music
- Producer: Chucho Ferrer

Daniela Romo chronology
También Yo; Te Pareces Mucho a Mí (1979)	Daniela Romo (1983)

Te Pareces Mucho a Mí Album chronology
Amor Prohibido (1984)	Te Pareces Mucho a Mí (1985)	Dueña de mi Corazón (1985)

Alternative cover
- 1985 Re-issue

También Yo (English: So am I or So do I) is the first studio album by the Mexican pop singer Daniela Romo. It was released in 1979 and re-issued in 1985. All of the songs were composed by Lolita de la Colina and arrangements and direction were by Chucho Ferrer.

== History ==
Daniela Romo recorded the album with CBS Records. When this label wanted to promote its release, Romo was totally committed to the shooting of the telenovela El Enemigo with Televisa. She earned more popularity because of the soap opera, so CBS tried to promote the album again, but Romo was hired to act as the main heroine in No Temas al Amor and once again the promotion was canceled. All this was a strategy by Televisa who did not like the content of the album, wanting something different for one of its exclusive artists. In 1985, CBS decided to re-issue the album as Te Pareces Mucho a Mí (You seem so much to me).

== Track listing ==
=== 1979 tracks ===
1. También yo
2. Todo pasa
3. A saber
4. Tratando de hacerme feliz
5. Canción para tu alcoba
6. Que tengas un buen día
7. Te pareces mucho a mí
8. El mejor de mis amores
9. Que inocente fui
10. Poca cosa

=== 1985 tracks ===
1. Tratando de hacerme feliz
2. Qué inocente fui
3. Todo pasa
4. Canción para tu alcoba
5. A saber
6. Te pareces mucho a mí
7. También yo
8. Poca cosa
9. Que tengas un buen día
10. El mejor de mis amores
