= Todo, Todo, Todo =

Single by Daniela Romo

from the album Amada más que nunca
- Released: 1991
- Genre: Latin pop
- Length: 4:29
- Label: Capitol/EMI Latin
- Songwriter: Jorsaci
- Producer: Bebu Silvetti

Daniela Romo singles chronology
"Amada Más Que Nunca" (1991)	"Todo, Todo, Todo" (1991)	"Nadie Entiende" (1991)

"Todo, Todo, Todo" (English: Everything, Everything, Everything) is a song written by Jorsaci, produced by Bebu Silvetti, and performed by Mexican singer-songwriter and actress Daniela Romo. It was released by EMI Latin in 1991 as the second single from Romo's sixth studio album Amada más que nunca (1991). The song became the second number-one single for Romo in the Billboard Top Latin Songs chart, after "De Mí Enamórate" five years prior. Romo earned two nominations at the Lo Nuestro Award in 1992 for the track, Pop Song of the Year and Best Music Video, winning the latter. "Todo, Todo, Todo" has a choreography which is a staple at Filipino informal/formal (hall) parties. The video received a Billboard Music nomination for Latin Video of the Year by a Female Artist.

The song debuted in the Billboard Top Latin Songs chart (formerly Hot Latin Tracks) chart at number 29 in the week of May 25, 1991, climbing to the top ten two weeks later. "Todo, Todo, Todo" peaked at number-one on May 5, 1991, replacing "Mi Deseo" by Mexican band Los Bukis and being succeeded ten weeks later by "Cosas del Amor" by American singer Vikki Carr and Mexican singer-songwriter Ana Gabriel. "Todo, Todo, Todo" ended 1991 as the second best performing Latin single of the year in the United States.

== See also ==
- Billboard Top Latin Songs Year-End Chart
- List of number-one Billboard Hot Latin Tracks of 1991
