= Tony Medina =

Cuban songwriter

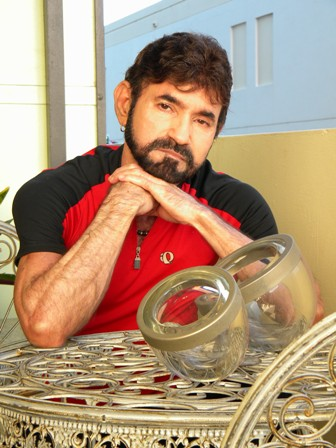
- Born: José Antonio Medina Cuba
- Died: June 8, 2011
- Occupation: Composer/songwriter
- Genre: Latin pop music, Classical music

Website
- www.tonymedinamusic.com

Tony Medina (José Antonio Medina) was a Cuban-born songwriter and writer of popular literature. He is known for the diversity of his musical compositions, which have been recorded by top Latin music artists like Rocio Jurado, Daniela Romo, and Alicia Villareal. His poetry has been published in literary anthologies.

== Career ==
Medina's professional songwriting career began in December 1992, when "Para Que Te Quedes Conmigo" (To Keep You With Me), performed by Mexican superstar Daniela Romo, reached number-one in Billboard Magazine's Hot Latin Tracks Chart. The song remained in the top three chart positions for twelve consecutive weeks and went on to become one of the year's biggest Latin music hits in the United States, Central and South America. In Broadcast Music, Inc's (BMI's) inaugural Latin Music Awards ceremony held in 1993, Medina was honored for writing one of the year's most performed songs.

Shortly after his first hit, Spanish superstar, Rocío Jurado, included Medina's "Yo Te Amo" (I Love You) on her 1993 album "Como Las Alas Al Viento" (Like the Wings in the Wind). The late Jurado, widely considered as one of the Latin entertainment world's most respected voices, reached the top of the music charts with "Yo Te Amo" in Europe and Latin America.

Medina's success continued as he wrote a string of popular compositions which quickly established him as a prolific songwriter who became known for his catchy, varied themes, both musically and lyrically. He has written his words and music in many popular musical styles. His ample catalog includes rumba flamencas, ballads, boleros and tangos, and Medina has written songs in the regional Mexican, pop, tropical, and rock music styles. Artists from many nationalities and musical genres have interpreted his songs. The roster of singers interpreting Medina's songs includes performers from Argentina, Bolivia, Brazil, Colombia, Chile, Cuba, the Dominican Republic, France, Mexico, Nicaragua, Portugal, Spain, and the U.S.A.

Tony Medina wrote over 600 songs in various musical genres. Among his many television appearances was his participation on the top-rated Mexican talk show, "Ibero America Va", which was hosted by famed actress and talk show icon Verónica Castro.

== Notable songs and productions ==
- "Para Que Te Quedes Conmigo" (To Keep You With Me), Daniela Romo from the album De Mil Colores
- "Yo Te Amo" (I Love You), Rocío Jurado
- "Caricias De Humo" (Caresses of Smoke), Lucía Méndez
- "Intentare Olvidarte" (I'll Try to Forget You), Los Mier y Yolando del Rio
- "Un Chance" (A Chance), Maria Sorte
- "Ay Amor" (Oh Love), Grupo Limite/Alicia Villareal
- "Mundo Magico" (Magic World), Imanol
- "Me Gusta Todo De Ti" (I Like Everything About You), Crystal
- "Como Decirte Que Te Amo" (How to Tell You I love You), Banda Copala
- "Aunque Te Vayas Con El" (Even if You Go With Him), Emigrantes Del Norte
- "La Miradita" (The Little Look), Chambacu
- "Te Amare Otra Vez" (I'll Love You Again), Azteka
- "Paloma O Pantera" (Dove or Panther), Maggie Carles
- "Con Permiso Senora" (With Permission, Maam), Milton Cortez
- "Por Amarte Asi" (For Loving You This Way), Rey Ruiz
- "Tony Medina Classical Music-Volume 1," Various Artists
- "Tony Medina-Poemas de Amor" (Poems of Love) Recited by Tony Medina with original music

In addition to the success of his songs discographically, Medina's music has been performed on television, stage, and in movies, and has been dispersed in both Spanish-speaking and non Spanish-speaking countries throughout the world. The 2004 critically acclaimed film "La Niña Santa" (The Holy Girl), incorporates Medina's words and music as dialog in an important scene between two of the movie's protagonists. "The Holy Girl" participated in The Cannes Film Festival (2004) and was co-executively produced by the two-time Academy Award-winning Pedro Almódovar. The film has been translated or subtitled into multiple languages.

== Literature ==
Medina was also an accomplished poet and writer of short stories, and his poetry has been published in various literary anthologies. In 1999, four of his poems ("Por Ti" - For you; "Altar De Luz" - Altar of Light; "Piel Hambrienta" - Lonely Skin; "Ladron De Paraiso" - Thief of Paradise) were selected to be included in "Hagase La Poesia" (Let There Be Poetry), a literary collection of poems representing the past seventy years in modern Spanish language poetry. The collection was published in Argentina by El Editor Interamericano (The Interamerican Editor), and compiled by Argentine literary editor Oscar Abel Ligaluppi.

In 2001, two of Medina's poems ("Agua Esclava" - Slave Water and "Mujer" - Woman) were selected for another Argentine literary publication entitled, "Diccionario De Poetas Hispano-Americanos Contemporaneos (2001)", (Dictionary of Contemporary Hispanic-American Poets).

In tribute to Medina's creative writing abilities, the publisher Angel Azul, published a book entitled, "Y Que Lo Comente El Pueblo" (Let The People Talk), which is a collection of over 100 of Medina's poems and four of his short stories.

His first instrumental album entitled "Tony Medina Classical Music-Volume 1," was released by Musihit International in October 2010. The album's 20 songs are performed by various artists and all were composed by Medina. An audio CD of thirty three of Tony Medina's poems was also released by Musihit in October 2010. The poems are recited by Medina and each poem is accompanied by his original background music.

== Death ==
Tony Medina died unexpectedly on June 8, 2011, after suffering from sudden cardiac arrest. The majority of his music catalog remains unpublished.
