= Amor Prohibido (disambiguation) =

Amor Prohibido is a 1994 album by Selena.

Amor prohibido (Forbidden love) may also refer to:

== Music ==
- "Amor Prohibido" (song), the title track of Selena's album
- Amor Prohibido Tour, the 1994-95 tour of Selena
- Amor Prohibido (Daniela Romo album), a 1984 album, or title track
- "Amor Prohibido", a song by Baby Rasta & Gringo
- "Amor Prohibido", a song by Nicky Jam from Fénix
- "Amor Prohibido", a song by Prince Royce from Five
- "Amor Prohibido", a song by Los Rieleros del Norte

== Films and television ==
- Amor prohibido (film), a 1958 film by Luis César Amadori
- Amor prohibido, a 1944 film directed by Arcady Boytler
- Amor prohibido (TV series), 1979 Mexican telenovela
