= Manuela Ímaz =

Mexican actress (born 1979)

- Born: Manuela Eugenia Ímaz Houglín; June 14, 1979 (age 46); Chilpancingo, Guerrero, Mexico
- Spouse: Arturo Villanueva
- Children: Alaya
- Relatives: Rubén Imaz (cousin)

Manuela Ímaz (born Manuela Eugenia Ímaz Houglín; June 14, 1979) is a Mexican actress, born in Chilpancingo, Guerrero, Mexico.

== Biography ==
Manuela began her artistic career as a TV host on the TeleHit channel, where she appeared in El Planeta de Cabeza and Zona Pública.

She had to wait until 2001 for her first opportunity as an actress, when Emilio Larrosa asked her to take part in his telenovela, Amigas y rivales.

Her great performance in the melodrama demonstrated her acting ability to Larrosa, who then invited her to take part in Las Vías del Amor (2002), credited alongside major actors such as Enrique Rocha and Daniela Romo.

After a break, she resumed her career in Corazones al límite (2004), where she played Isadora.

=== Family ===
She has a daughter named Alaya, born in 2003.

Her cousin is film director Rubén Ímaz.

== Filmography ==
=== Telenovelas ===
- Vencer la culpa(2023). . .
- Por Ella Soy Eva (2012)... Patricia Lorca
- Rafaela (2010) ... Arely
- Llena de amor (2011) .... Fabiola
- Sortilegio (2009)... Katia Alanis
- Al Diablo con los Guapos (2008)... Marisela Echevarria
- Muchachitas como tú (2007)... Raquel
- Amar sin límites (2006)... Cecilia
- Apuesta por un amor (2004)... Gracia
- Corazones al límite (2004)... Isadora
- Las vías del amor (2002-2003)... Rosaura
- Amigas y Rivales (2001)... Tamara de la Colina
- Camila (1998-1999)
