= So Am I =

So Am I may refer to:

- "So Am I" (Ava Max song), 2019
- "So Am I" (Ty Dolla Sign song), 2017
- "So Am I", 1924 song written by Ira Gershwin and composed by George Gershwin, first heard in Lady, Be Good (musical)
- "So Am I", 1994 song by Alison Moyet from Essex
- "So Am I", 2006 song by Trent Willmon from A Little More Livin'

== See also ==
- También Yo, album by Daniela Romo, also known as So Do I or So Am I
- So Do I (disambiguation)
