= La Cita (album) =

Studio album by Daniela Romo
- Released: 1994
- Recorded: 1994
- Genre: Ranchera, bolero
- Label: Melody
- Producer: Bebu Silvetti

Daniela Romo chronology
De Mil Colores (1992)	La Cita (1994)	Un nuevo amor (1996)

La Cita (English:The date or The appointment) is the tenth studio album by the Mexican pop singer Daniela Romo. This album was released on 1994 and it was produced by Bebu Silvetti. The producer took advantage of the telenovela "Si Dios Me Quita La Vida" (If God takes away my life) to release this album that has the main theme of that soap opera. Sales were not good to the albums, when the critics were not impressed with the telenovela. Besides, Romo had a rival in that year in sales, Luis Miguel with Segundo Romance, with this album of the same genre.

== Track listing ==
Tracks:

=== Disc 1 ===
1. "Amor mio"
2. "Cien años"
3. "Voy"
4. "Un mundo raro"
5. "La cita"
6. "De que manera te olvido"
7. "La noche de anoche"
8. "Canta canta canta"
9. "Que va"
10. "Mi amigo el tiempo"

=== Disc 2 ===
1. "Que sabes tú"
2. "Mulata"
3. "Si Dios me quita la vida"
4. "Dame un poco de ti"
5. "Si nos dejan"
6. "Toda una vida"
7. "Que has hecho de mí"
8. "La corriente"
9. "Franqueza"
10. "Cheque en blanco"

== Sales ==
Region	Certification	Certified units/sales
Mexico	—	100,000
