= De Mi Alma Latina =

Studio album by Plácido Domingo
- Released: 13 September 1994
- Genre: Latin pop
- Length: 1:13:06
- Language: Spanish
- Labels: Angel, EMI Latin
- Producer: Bebu Silvetti

Plácido Domingo chronology
Domingo Sings and Conducts Tchaikovsky (1994)	De Mi Alma Latina (1994)	Bajo El Cielo Español (1996)

De Mi Alma Latina (also known as From My Latin Soul) is a 1994 Latin music album by Spanish tenor Plácido Domingo. It was nominated for a Grammy Award for Best Latin Pop Album of the year. Most of the tracks on the album are medleys of, in the words of one author, "some of the Latino world's most memorable melodies". The only new composition on the album, "De México a Buenos Aires", was written by Domingo's son Plácido Domingo Jr. All the songs are in Spanish, except for "Manhã de Carnaval" and "Aquarela do Brasil", which are in Portuguese. Domingo also used "De Mi Alma Latina" and "From My Latin Soul" as the names for some of his subsequent Latin music concerts. In 1997, he released a follow-up album entitled De Mi Alma Latina 2.

== Background ==
Both Angel Records and EMI Latin worked together on the album. The president of EMI Latin explained that both labels were trying to "reach every possible Placido fan out there, be it Latino or opera." In addition to the audio recording, Domingo starred in a music video of one of the songs on the album, the Peruvian classic "La flor de la canela", with Colombian actress Amparo Grisales.

== Reception ==
Professional ratings
Review scores
Source	Rating
AllMusic	3/5 stars

The reviewer for The Washington Post praised the album as in some ways "the most satisfying record Domingo has made." After stating that numerous good recordings of operas exist, he elaborated: "But you don't find much when you start looking (as I have) for a recording of 'Aquellos ojos verdes' or 'Solamente una vez' sung with a voice of Domingo's caliber and an instinct for the proper style." He also called Domingo "versatile as any musician in living memory" in part for the variety of recordings he had out at the time, including De Mi Alma Latina, the opera Parsifal, the classical symphonic album, Placido Domingo Sings and Conducts Tchaikovsky, and re-issues of Placido Domingo: Opera Classics and Verdi and Puccini Duets (with Leontyne Price). Domingo's multi-platinum live recording as part of the Three Tenors, The Three Tenors in Concert 1994, also came out two weeks before De Mi Alma Latina.

In January 1995, the recording's Grammy nomination for Best Latin Pop Album was the first ever received by the classical music label, Angel Records. At the time of the album's nomination, Billboard called De Mi Alma Latina underrated and predicted that Domingo might beat frontrunner and eventual winner Luis Miguel for his Segundo Romance.

== Track listing ==
No.	Title	Writer(s)	Length
1.	"Aquellos ojos verdes"	Nilo Menendez, Adolfo Utrera	3:49
2.	"La flor de la canela / Que nadie sepa mi sufrir / Amarraditos"	Angel Cabral, Enrique Dizeo, Margarita Durán, Chabuca Granda, Pedro Belisario Pérez, Bebu Silvetti	5:01
3.	"Nosotros / Contigo / Sin tí"	Claudio Estrada, Pepe Guízar, Pedro Junco Jr., Bebu Silvetti	5:43
4.	"De México a Buenos Aires"	Placido Domingo, Jr.	3:06
5.	"Se Me Olvidó Otra Vez"	Juan Gabriel	3:32
6.	"El Humahuaqueño / Caballo Viejo / Moliendo Café"	Simon Díaz, José Manzo, Edmundo Porteño, Bebu Silvetti	4:10
7.	"Delirio / Alma Llanera"	Pedro Elias Gutiérrez, César Portillo De La Luz, Bebu Silvetti	4:54
8.	"Solamente una vez / Veracruz / Noche de ronda"	Agustín Lara, María Teresa Lara, Bebu Silvetti	5:58
9.	"Manhã de Carnaval / Aquarela do Brasil"	Ary Barroso, Luiz Bonfá, Antonio M. de Moraes, Bebu Silvetti	8:17
10.	"Sabrás que te quiero"	Teddy Fregoso	3:38
11.	"Alfonsina y el mar / Gracias a la vida"	Félix Luna, Violeta Parra, Ariel Ramírez, Bebu Silvetti	4:51
12.	"Lamento borincano / Vereda tropical"	Gonzalo Curiel, Rafael Hernández, Bebu Silvetti	4:33
13.	"Como ayer"	Sylvia Riera Ibanez, Bebu Silvetti	3:34
14.	"Perfidia / Frenesí / La última noche"	Bobby Collazo, Alberto Dominguez, Bebu Silvetti	4:30
15.	"Adiós"	Pierre Cour, Alberto L. Martínez, Mariano Mores	3:35
16.	"Por amor / Así como te buscaba / Yo vendo unos ojos negros"	Pierre Cour, Alberto L. Martínez, Mariano Mores, José de Jesús Muñoz Ospina, Bebu Silvetti, Rafael Solano	3:55

== Chart positions ==
Chart (1994)	Peak position
UK	97
US Classical Crossover	4
US Latin	6
US Latin Pop	4

== Sales and certifications ==
Region	Certification	Certified units/sales
Argentina (CAPIF)	Platinum	60,000^{^}
Chile	—	22,000
Mexico (AMPROFON)	Gold	100,000^{^}
^{^} Shipments figures based on certification alone.

== Personnel ==
- Plácido Domingo, vocals
- Bebu Silvetti, conductor, arranger, piano, synthesizer
- VVC Symphonic Orchestra
- WC Symphony
- Ana Gabriel, guest vocals
- Daniela Romo, guest vocals
- Patricia Sosa, guest vocals
- Pandora, guest vocals
- Francis Benítez, backup vocals
- Bibi Cross-Nicolosi, backup vocals
- Pierre Garreaud, backup vocals
- Daniel Indart, backup vocals
- Yari Moré, backup vocals
- Carlos Murguía, backup vocals
- Ana Robles, backup vocals
- Sara Traina, backup vocals
- Giselda Vatchky, backup vocals
