= So Do I =

So Do I may refer to:

- "So Do I", 1932 song heard in Take a Chance (musical)
- "So Do I", 1936 song by Bing Crosby, also heard in Pennies from Heaven (1936 film)
- "So Do I", 2001 song by Christy Moore from This Is the Day (album)
- "So Do I", song by Johnny Cash first recorded in 1961 and then released in The Unissued Johnny Cash, the 1978 compilation of unreleased or rare songs
- "So Do I?", 2010 song by Shamrock (band) from Shamrock

== See also ==
- "And So Do I", 1998 song by Ivor Cutler from A Flat Man
- También Yo, album by Daniela Romo, also known as So Do I or So Am I
- "So Do I Say Sorry First?", 2007 song by Stephanie McIntosh
- So Am I (disambiguation)
