= Gitana =

Gitana (English: Gypsy) may refer to:

- Gitana, alternate name of Gitanae, an ancient Greek city
- Gitana, Romani people in Spain
- Gitana, a series of 17 boats originating with Gitana (1876), now operated by Gitana Team

== Music ==
- Gitana (album), a 1987 album released by Mexican singer Daniela Romo
  - "Gitana", a song from the album
- "Gitana", a song by Puerto Rican-American musician Willie Colón
- "Gitana", a song by Maná on the album Falta Amor
- "Gitana", a song by Wisin on the album El Sobreviviente
- "Gitana", the Spanish version of "Gypsy" by Shakira
- "Alma de Gitana", a song by Ednita Nazario from the album Tú Sin Mí
- "Gitana", a harp piece by Alphonse Hasselmans
