= Ave Fenix =

Ave Fénix (the phoenix bird) may refer to:

- Ave Fénix, an album by Daniela Romo, and "Ave Fenix", a song on the album
- Ave Fénix (TV series), a Mexican telenovela
- A film company co-founded by Zachary Laoutides
- Ave Fénix, a 1986 film directed by Rafael Baledón
