= Déjame vivir =

Mexican telenovela

- Genre: Telenovela
- Created by: Inés Rodena
- Written by: Tessie Picasso
- Directed by: Rafael Banquells
- Starring: Daniela Romo; Gregorio Casal; Beatriz Aguirre; Elizabeth Dupeyrón; Servando Manzetti; José Reymundi
- Opening theme: Déjame Vivir by Daniela Romo
- Country of origin: Mexico
- Original language: Spanish
- No. of episodes: 170

Production
- Executive producer: Valentín Pimstein
- Cinematography: Gabriel Vázquez Bulmán
- Running time: 21-22 minutes
- Production company: Televisa

Original release
- Network: Canal de las Estrellas
- Release: March 18 – November 10, 1982

Related
- En busca del paraíso; Cristina (1970) Siempre te amaré (2000) Valeria (2008) Lo imperdonable (2015)

Déjame vivir (English title: Let me live) is a Mexican telenovela produced by Valentín Pimstein for Televisa in 1982. This is a remake of the 1970 Venezuelan telenovela Cristina. The reception for this telenovela was not good, in fact it was selected as the worst one of 1982.

Daniela Romo and Gregorio Casal starred as protagonists, while the first actress Beatriz Aguirre and Elizabeth Dupeyrón starred as antagonists.

== Plot ==
Estrella struggles to move forward with her family (a younger brother very attached to her, a teenage and ambitious sister and an almost absent father). She is the dressmaker of Graciela who hires the girl to make her clothes, so Estrella have to go every now and then her house to take measures, in one of these visits she meets her son Enrique who is immediately attracted. Enrique begins a relationship with Estrella and Graciela meddles since her son can not fall in love with a seamstress.

== Cast ==
- Daniela Romo as Estrella
- Gregorio Casal as Enrique
- Elizabeth Dupeyrón as Gilda
- Beatriz Aguirre as Graciela
- Servando Manzetti as Gustavo
- José Reymundi as German "El Duque"
- Macaria as Yolanda
- Rosalba Brambila as Nina
- Ruben Rojo as Nicolas
- Rodolfo Gomez Lora as Tomasito
- Lilia Aragón as Dalia
- Magda Karina as Mercedes
- Maricruz Nájera as Josefina
- José Elías Moreno as Rafael
