= Sueños de Cabaret =

Studio album by Daniela Romo
- Released: 2008
- Recorded: 2008
- Genre: Pop; acoustic; cabaret
- Label: EMI Music México
- Producer: Guillermo Gil

Daniela Romo chronology
La Cita (1994)	Sueños de Cabaret (2008)

Sueños de Cabaret (English Cabaret Dreams) is the second cover album by Mexican pop singer Daniela Romo after 1994's La Cita. It was released in 2008.

== History ==
The album was produced by Guillermo Gil. With the use of her great voice and interpretive mastery Daniela presents 11 contemporary themes carried to the atmosphere of the fifties that are decked with the sound of the orchestra and the sensual sound of the cabaret.

== Track listing ==
Tracks:

1. Abuso
2. Mía
3. Intocable
4. Tú de que vas
5. Qué manera de quererte
6. Mi credo
7. No Podrás
8. Mujer contra mujer
9. Color Esperanza
10. Víveme
11. Pensar en ti

=== Covered Singers ===
- Pedro Infante
- Aleks Syntek
- Franco De Vita
- Gilberto Santa Rosa
- Pepe Aguilar
- Cristian Castro
- Mecano
- Diego Torres
- Laura Pausini
- Luis Miguel

== Credits ==
- Juan Barbosa → Production Assistant
- Agustin Bernal → Double Bass
- Beto Dominguez → Guitar, Percussion, Percussion Arrangement
- Moisés Garcia → Trumpet
- Güicho Gil → Mastering
- Guillermo Gil → Producer
- Memo Gil → Guitar, Mixing, Percussion Arrangement, Recording
- Héctor Martínez → Concept, A&R
- Tono Peregrino → Chorus
- Raul Rodrigo → Graphic Design
- Paco Rosas → Guitar (Electric)
- Pancho Ruiz → Producer, Chorus
- Abel Sanchez → Sax (Alto)
- Uriel Santana → Photography
- Mario Santos → Piano, Arranger, Producer
