= Es la Nostalgia =

Studio album by Daniela Romo
- Released: 2005
- Recorded: 2005
- Genre: Acoustic latin ballad
- Label: EMI Music México
- Producer: Daniela Romo; Adrián Posse; Tina Galindo

Daniela Romo chronology
Ave Fénix (2001)	Es la Nostalgia (2005)	La Voz del Corazón (2015)

Es la Nostalgia (English It's the nostalgia) is the 12th studio album by Mexican pop singer Daniela Romo. It was released in 2005.

== History ==
The project followed the luck of its predecessor Ave Fénix since it was largely ignored because Daniela was busy in telenovelas. This time Daniela returns to her roots of romantic ballads under the supervision of Adrián Posse and Tina Galindo, she also count on famous Spanish songwriters like Rudy Pérez with the song "Sería Fácil" (It'd be easy) and the Argentinian singer Jairo with the songs "Es la nostalgia" and its French version "Quand un oiseau pleure" (When a bird cries), the facility of Daniela to pronounce French made this song to be selected to be part of an album of various French singers like Édith Piaf, Gilbert Bécaud, Charles Trenet, among others, being Daniela the only non-native French speaker.

== Track listing ==
Tracks:

1. Simple
2. Debilidad
3. Sería fácil
4. Cuando tú me amas
5. Oración
6. Mañana será igual
7. Qué voy a hacer sin ti
8. Amar de este modo
9. No supe vivir sin ti
10. Para tocar el cielo
11. Es la nostalgia
12. Quand un oiseau pleure

=== Singles ===
- Sería fácil
- Simple
- Debilidad
- Es la nostalgia

== Credits ==
- Nico Garibotti → Production Assistant
- Joel Numa → Mixing
- Robin Reinfried → Engineer
- Bruce Weeden → Mastering
