= A Millón =

Univision game show

- Presented by: Daniela Romo
- Country of origin: United States
- Original language: Spanish
- No. of seasons: 1

Original release
- Network: Univision
- Release: 2000 – 2001

A Millón (A Million) is a game show which aired on Spanish-language channel Univision from 2000 to 2001. It was billed as the network's response to Who Wants to Be a Millionaire?. It consisted of a modified format involving the same pyramid system and multiple choice question format which were used on Millionaire, though with several other unique elements. The show was hosted by Mexican singer and actress Daniela Romo.

== Format ==
After the host comes on stage, she introduces a profile of the contestant trying to win $1 million before the contestant enters the studio. Both then had a discussion in another part of the studio about why the contestant was playing the game, then both move to the main set, where the game is played with some assistance from the contestant's family members.

In the game segment, the player has to face four levels of multiple choice questions, following this format:

Correct Answers	Dollar Amount
4	$1,000
5	$10,000
6	$100,000
7	$1,000,000

The scoreboard keeps track of the player's current correct answers by showing the value of that level in rotating numbers. As each correct answer is given, a number 'locks' into place. Once that level's value is complete, that amount is won. The $1,000,000 was never won.

A wrong answer earns a strike, and three strikes end the game and drop the player back to nothing. Should a player receive two strikes, he/she has the option to quit with his/her winnings. However, the player also receives three Passes to use at any time during the game. As long as the player has at least one Pass available, the answer choices will be shown without the question, and the contestant then has the opportunity to use a Pass before seeing the question.
