= Rosita Pelayo =

Mexican actress (1958–2023)

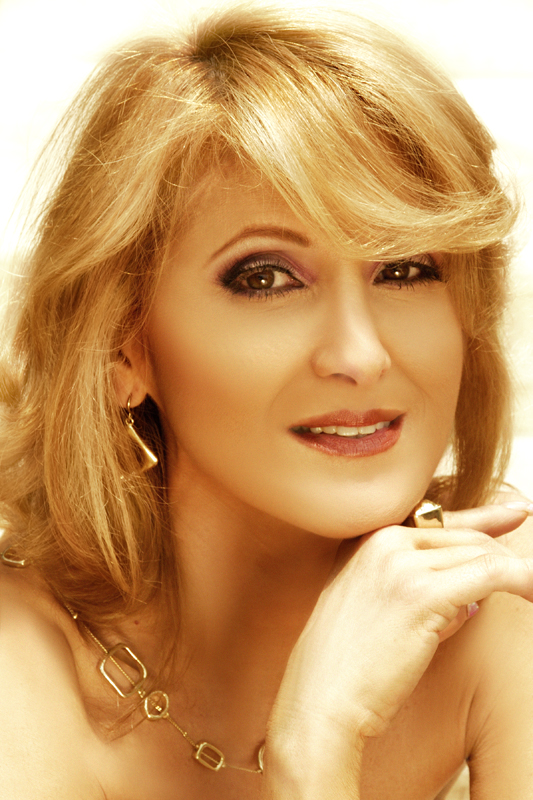
Image of Rosy Pelayo

Rosita Pelayo (19 December 1958 – 16 December 2023) was a Mexican actress known for her roles in Las amazonas, Salomé, and Sortilegio.

== Life and career ==
Rosita Pelayo was born in Mexico City on 19 December 1958, the daughter of game show host and voice actor Luis Manuel Pelayo. She died of colorectal cancer on 16 December 2023, three days before her 65th birthday.
