= Los Cuates de Chabelo =

Studio album by Various
- Released: 1999
- Recorded: 1999
- Genre: Pop
- Producer: Xavier López

Daniela Romo Thematic Albums chronology
Me gusta J.S Bach Remix (1996)	Los Cuates de Chabelo (1999)	Juan Pablo Esperanza, Amigo del Alma (1999)

Los Cuates de Chabelo (English The friends of Chabelo) is an album by various singers. Chabelo produced the project in which musicians as Daniela Romo, Tania Libertad, Kabah and Celia Cruz honour Chabelo's work.

== Track listing ==
1. "Yo Soy Chabelo" (Orquesta En Familia)
2. "Mamacita, ¿Dónde Está Santa Claus?" (Celia Cruz)
3. "Adiós Superman" (Kabah)
4. "Coco No Hay" (Daniela Romo)
5. "Mamá Mamá" (Tania Libertad)
6. "El León" (Saúl Hernández & Sabo Romo)
7. "ABCD" (Yuri)
8. "Yo No Quiero Un Hermanito" (Aleks Syntek)
9. "Qué Tráfico Compadre" (Pedro Fernández)
10. "Perrito Maltes" (La Lupita)
11. "Aladino" (Aureo Baqueiro)
12. "Garabato Colorado" (Límite)
13. "El Reino del Revés" (La Candelaria)
14. "Yo Soy Chabelo" (Chabelo)
