= Chabelo =

Mexican actor (1935–2023)

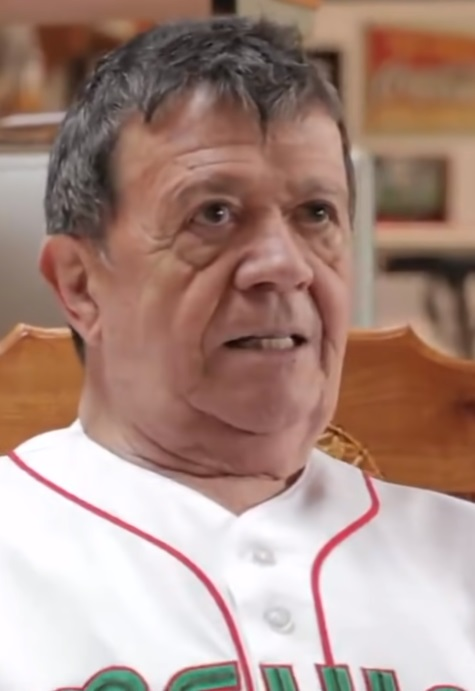
- Chabelo in 2021
- Born: Xavier López Rodríguez; 17 February 1935; Chicago, Illinois, U.S.
- Died: 25 March 2023 (aged 88); Mexico City, Mexico
- Occupations: Actor, television host
- Years active: 1952–2019

Xavier López Rodríguez (17 February 1935 – 25 March 2023), known professionally as Chabelo, was a Mexican actor, comedian, television presenter and children's music singer. In addition to his television career, Chabelo appeared in more than thirty motion pictures and recorded more than thirty musical albums. He produced shows including La Cuchufleta, La Güereja Quiere Más and En Familia con Chabelo, the latter of which was broadcast every Sunday morning on Televisa's Canal de las Estrellas. It aired for 47 years and consisted of contests with people from the audience, gifts and games and was mainly for children. The program ended on 20 December 2015. At the time of his death, he was one of the last surviving stars from the Golden Age of Mexican cinema.

== Early life ==
Xavier López was born on 17 February 1935 in Chicago, Illinois, before the family moved back to Mexico and settled in the city of León, Guanajuato.

During the Korean War, López was drafted into the US Army and served on a military base in California before returning to Mexico.

After returning from his service, López began studying medicine with the hope of working as a doctor. While studying, he began working for the Televisa television network as an assistant and occasionally filled in for other actors, leading to him landing the creation of Chabelo.

== Artistic career ==
Xavier López's career really began when he met a famous couple of actors, whose names were "Panseco y Gamboa". Panseco worked on radio, and Gamboa (Ramiro), worked on TV. This pair was already known in Mexico and they taught Chabelo the basics of the TV business.

Xavier López was hired as his “Chabelo” character to be the spokesman of Pepsi Cola, for which he traveled all over North and South America. After the contract, he found himself unemployable due to his strong association with the Pepsi brand. He was hired for a show in New York City for a fraction of what he was used to charging, and ended up touring the US for six months with Tongolele. After the tour, he negotiated a return to TV for a half hour daily show. He also appeared as "Panchito" in Cantinflas film El Extra (1962).

=== En Familia con Chabelo ===
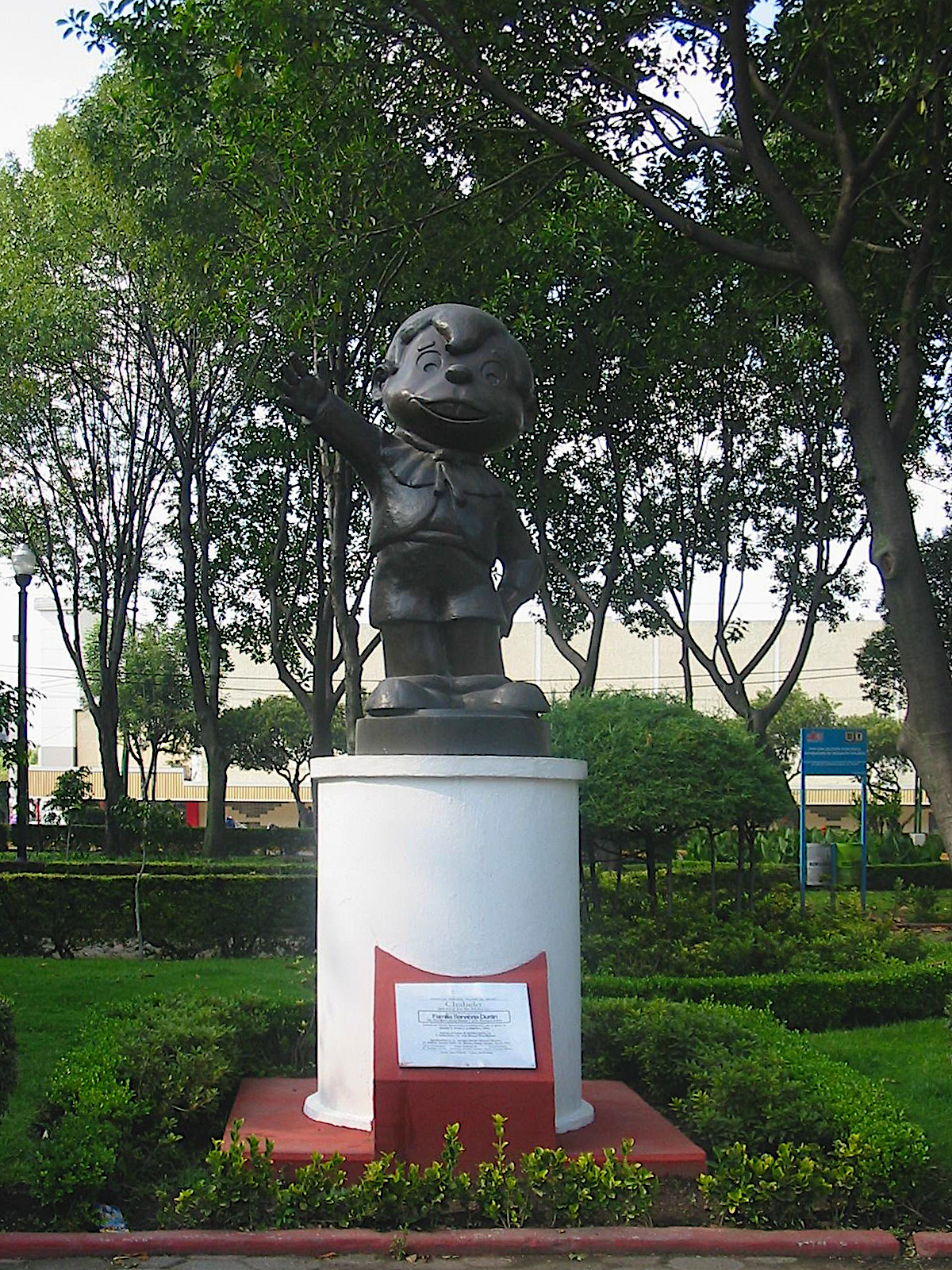
Statue in honor of Chabelo located in the "Jardin de los Grandes Valores" (Garden of Great Values) in Mexico City. It is a caricatured representation of his character in the program En Familia con Chabelo

López had the idea of doing a show where parents and children could participate and enjoy these mornings together. En Familia con Chabelo (In Family with Chabelo) is well known in Latin America, it is a show with games, contests and gifts where Lopez plays the role of TV host, and presents himself as a child named Chabelo. On 30 December 2012, the show was awarded a Guinness Record for its 44 years of uninterrupted broadcast. Xavier López was awarded another Guinness Record for portraying the Chabelo character for over 57 years.

People involved in this program are children and their parents, with whom Chabelo interacts and gets them to participate in many contests. At the end of the show there is a famous contest called the Catafixia.

== Other shows ==
Chabelo featured in more than thirty films and recorded more than thirty albums. He also produced many programs like La Escuelita VIP, and Los Simuladores.

== Death ==
Chabelo died on 25 March 2023, at the age of 88.

== Filmography ==
=== TV shows ===
- En familia con Chabelo [In family with Chabelo] (1967-2015)
- La criada bien criada [The well-raised maid] (1970)
- El show del Loco Valdés [The Crazy Valdes Show] (1971)
- El show de Alejandro Suárez [The Alejandro Suarez Show] (1972)
- Detective de hotel [Hotel Detective] (1973-1974)
- La carabina de Ambrosio [Ambrosio's Carbine] (1978)
- La cuchufleta [The Cuchufleta] (1995)
- La Güereja y algo más [The Guereja and something more] (1998)
- La escuelita VIP [The VIP School] (2004)
- Los simuladores [The Simulators] (2009)

=== TV soaps ===
- Cuento de Navidad [Christmas story] (1999)
- Carita de ángel [Angel Face] (2000)
- Navidad sin fin [Endless Christmas] (2001)
- Amarte es mi pecado [Loving you is my sin] (2004)

=== Film ===
- Viaje a la Luna (1958)
- Chistelandia (1958)
- Nueva Chistelandia (1958)
- Vuelve Chistelandia (1958)
- El extra (1962)
- Buenas noche año nuevo (1964)
- Los reyes del volante (1964)
- Escuela para solteras (1965)
- Los dos rivales (1966)
- Autopsia de un fantasma (1968)
- La princesa hippie (1968)
- El aviso inoportuno (1968)
- Bang bang al hoyo (1970)
- Pepito y la lámpara maravillosa (1971)
- Chabelo y Pepito contra los monstruos (1973)
- Chabelo y Pepito detectives (1973)
- Los pepenadores de acá (1982)
- Macho que ladra no muerde (1984)
- Agente 0013: Hermelinda Linda 2 (1986)
- La tumba de Matías (1988)
- Dos machos que ladran no muerden (1988)
- Mi fantasma y yo (1988)
- Huevos de oro (1993)
- Chilindrina en apuros (1994)
- Club eutanasia (2005)
- Chicken Little (2005), voice of Buck Gallo
- Réquiem para Diana (2006)
- Amar (2009)
- Cartas a Elena (2011)
- El Crimen del Cácaro Gumaro (2014)
- Volando Bajo (2014)
- Coco (2017), voice actor
- El Complot Mongol (2018)

== See also ==
- Los Cuates de Chabelo, a 1999 album
