= Marcelo Córdoba =

Argentine actor

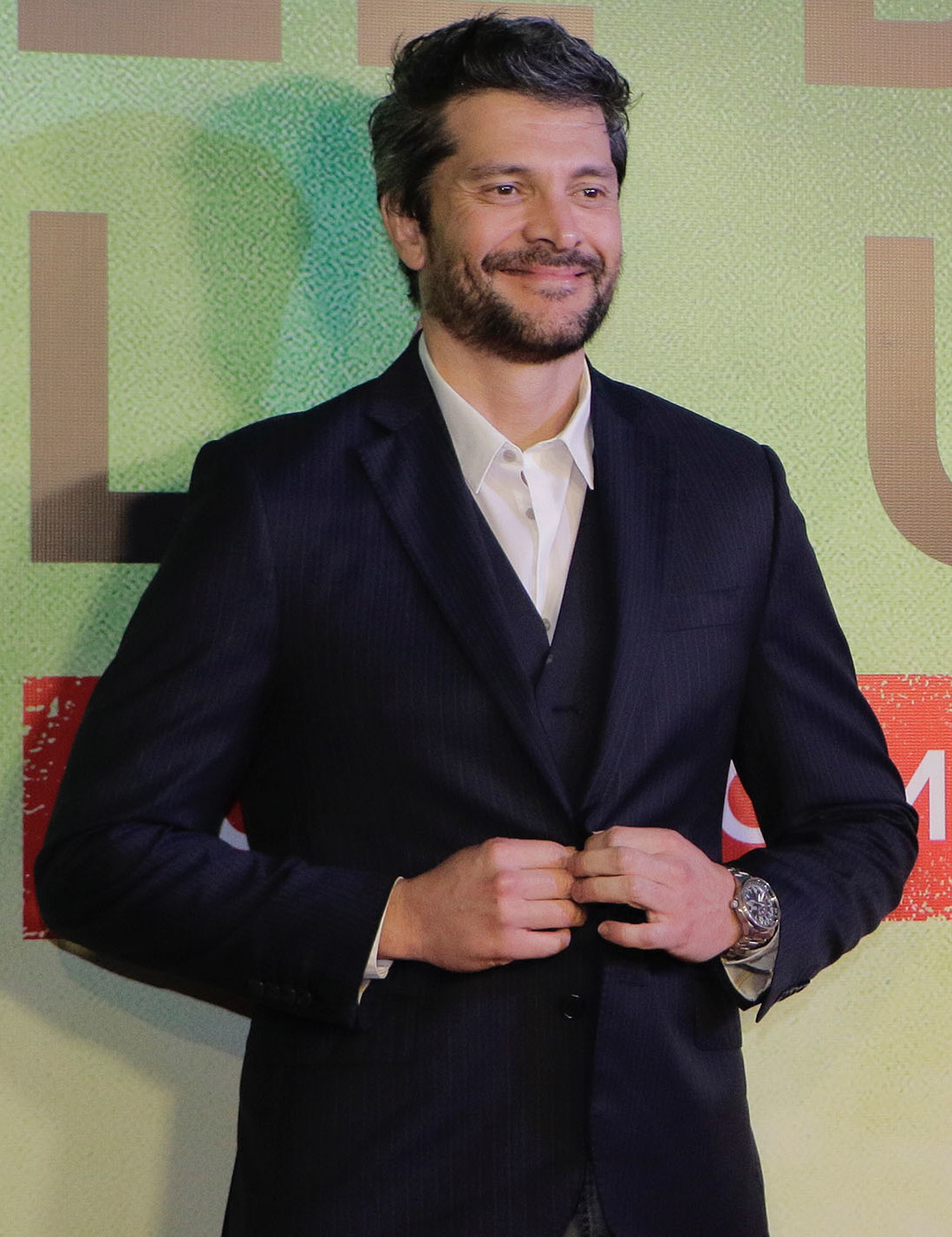
- Córdoba in 2018
- Born: Marcelo Alejandro Córdoba; 21 November 1973 (age 52); Buenos Aires, Argentina
- Occupation: Actor

Marcelo Alejandro Córdoba (born 21 November 1973) is an Argentine actor.

== Biography ==
Córdoba was born in Buenos Aires on 21 November 1973. After a few years of living in Mexico, he was in the cast of the 2005 telenovela Alborada, which was produced by Carla Estrada. In 2006, producer Roberto Hernández Vázquez convened and Cordoba joined the cast of Heridas de amor, a new version of 1991's, Valeria y Maximiliano. Also in 2006, he was in the cast of Amar sin límites.

In 2007, again Carla Estrada would call for action Fernando Colunga and Susana González in Pasión. In 2008 he starred in Juro que te amo with Ana Brenda and Jose Ron. In 2009, worked in Sortilegio production of Carla Estrada as Roberto Castelar.

In 2010, he played the antagonist in the telenovela Mar de amor, performed a cameo on the telenovela Llena de amor y participated in the chapter "Maria, fanática" in the third season of Mujeres asesinas.

He is Superior Naval and Oceanic Engineer, graduated from Polytechnic University of Buenos Aires, Argentina.

== Filmography ==
Film
Year	Title	Character	Notes
2013	Mimesis	El nuevo empresario	Short; associate producer

Television
Year	Title	Roles	Notes
2005-06	Alborada	Marcos López	Supporting role
2006	Mujer, casos de la vida real		Episode: "Chismes calientes"
2006	Heridas de amor	Daniel Bustamante	Supporting role
2006-07	Amar sin límites	Andrés Galván	Supporting role
2007-08	Pasión	Ascanio González	Supporting role
2008-09	Juro que te amo	Maximiliano Cuéllar	Supporting role
2009	Tiempo final	Carlos	Supporting role
2009	Sortilegio	Roberto Castelar	Main cast Season 3, Episode 1: "Periodista"
2009-10	Mar de amor	Hernán Irazabal	Supporting role
2010	Llena de amor	Young Jose Maria Sevilla "Captain"	1 episode
2010	Mujeres asesinas	Arturo	Main cast Season 3, Episode 11: "María, Fanática"
2011	La fuerza del destino	Antolín	Supporting role
2012	Por ella soy Eva	Plutarco Ramos Arrieta / Juan Carlos Caballero Mistral	Main role
2013	Amores verdaderos	Vicente Celorio	Supporting role
2013-14	De que te quiero, te quiero	Eleazar Medina Suaréz	Main role
2014	La malquerida	Alonso Rivas	Guest star
2014	La Gata	Javier Pañuela	Supporting role
2015	Nuestra Belleza Latina 2015	Himself	Celebrity guest (3rd Gala)
2015-16	Simplemente María	Rodrigo Aranda	Supporting role
2016	Mujeres de negro	Eddy Quijano	Supporting role
2017	Enamorándome de Ramón	Julio Medina	Main role
2019	La reina soy yo	Jack del Castillo	Recurring Role
2020	Vencer el miedo	Rubén Olivo	Recurring Role
2021-22	SOS me estoy enamorando	Omar	Main role

== Awards and nominations ==
Year	Category	Telenovela	Result
2012	Best Villain - People en Español	For Her, I’m Eva	Nominated
2013	Best Villain - Premios TVyNovelas	For Her, I’m Eva	Won
