= Gregorio Casal =

Mexican actor (1935–2018)

- Born: José de Jesús Casillas Rábago; 13 July 1935; San Miguel el Alto, Jalisco, Mexico
- Died: 25 April 2018 (aged 82)
- Occupation: Actor
- Years active: 1968-2013

Gregorio Casal (13 July 1935 – 25 April 2018) was a Mexican actor, best known for his work during the 1960s, 1970s and early 1980s.

== Acting ==
Pepechuy, as most people called him, changed his name so that there would be no confusion with his brother Mario Casillas who was beginning to become a big name. Other names he was known by include Gregorio Casal's, Gregorio Casals, Jesús Casillas and Gregorio Cassals.

=== Filmography ===
- El méndigo viejo (2002) (V)
- Pa' morir nacimos (2002) (as Gregorio Casals)
- Agarren al de los huevos (2000) (as Gregorio Casals)
- ¡Alerta!... La justicia de Rojo (2000)
- Cuando hierve la sangre (2000) (V)
- La fiera (1999) (as Gregorio Casal's)
- El profeta (1999/I)
- Siete millones (1999)
- Fuera de la ley (1998)
- Capo de capos (1998)
- Cazador de soplones (1998) (V)
- Con sangre de padre (1998) (V)
- Traición en Las Vegas (1998) (V)
- Pacas de a kilo (1997)
- Suburban del diablo (1997) (as Gregorio Casals)
- El último cazador (1997)
- Yo no necesito claves (1997)
- Cruz de madera (1996)
- El gatillero de la mafia (1995)
- El silla de ruedas 3 (Tienes que morir) (1994)
- La sucursal del infierno (1991) (as Gregorio Casals)
- La piel de la muerte (1990) .... Jonás
- Buscando la muerte (1989)
- Deuda saldada (1989)
- El fugitivo de Sonora (1989) (as Gregorio Casals)
- Me llaman violencia (1989)
- Ases del contrabando (1987)
- Asesino nocturno (1987) (as Gregorio Casals)
- Días de violencia (1987)
- Veganza policiaca (1987)
- La celda del alacran (1986)
- Cicatrices del alma (1986) TV series
- Tierra de rencores (1986) (as Gregorio Casals)
- Yako, cazador de malditos (1986)
- Nana (1985)
- Vivir un poco (1985) TV series .... Gonzalo Marcos
- Historia de una mujer escandalosa (1984)
- Los humillados (1984) (as Gregorio Cassals)
- Principessa (1984) TV series
- Amalia Batista (1983) TV series .... Augusto
- Mercenarios de la muerte (1983) .... Mai Ko
- Todos eran valientes (1983)
- Déjame vivir (1982) TV series
- Oro blanco, droga maldita (1982) .... Hernando Urrego
- Toña, nacida virgen (1982)
- El héroe desconocido (1981) .... Rigoberto Encinas
- El hogar que yo robé (1981) TV series .... Nicolás Aguirre
- La pachanga (1981) .... Alejo, the detective
- A paso de cojo (1980)
- Ambición (1980) TV series
- Tetakawi (1980)
- Ángel Guerra (1979) TV series .... Ángel Guerra
- La sotana del reo (1979) .... Manuel Camacho/Padre Manuel
- Las noches de Paloma (1978) .... Abel Mancilla
- Pasajeros en tránsito (1978)
- María José (1978) TV series (as Gregorio Casals) .... Pablo
- Humillados y ofendidos (1977) TV series
- El hombre del puente (1976) .... El hombre del puente
- Un amor extraño (1975)
- Chicano (1975)
- Pobre Clara (1975) TV series .... René
- Con amor de muerte (1974)
- La Choca (1974) .... Martín, el Gaucho
- El llanto de la tortuga (1974) .... Sergio
- El monasterio de los buitres (1973)
- Tu camino y el mío (1973)
- Mi primer amor (1973) TV series .... Héctor
- Penthouse (1973) TV series
- Cuna de valientes (1972)
- Cayó de la gloria el diablo (1972)
- Chanoc contra el tigre y el vampiro (1972)
- La señora joven (1972) TV series .... Octavio Servín
- Los dos hermanos (1971)
- El ídolo (1971)
- The Garden of Aunt Isabel (1971)
- Los corrompidos (1971) .... Chema
- Sublime reducción (1971) TV series
- Emiliano Zapata (1970)
- Santo contra los jinetes del terror (1970)
- Chanoc en las garras de las fieras (1970) .... Chanoc
- Paraíso (1970) (as Jesús Casillas) .... Arcelino
- La constitución (1970) TV series
- Trampas de amor (1969) (as Jesús Casillas)
- De turno con la angustia (1969) TV series
- Mi amor por ti (1969) TV series
- Sin palabras (1969) TV series .... Christian von Natch
- Por mis pistolas (1968) (as Jesús Casillas)
- Los caudillos (1968) TV series (as Jesús Casillas)
- Los inconformes (1968) TV series
