= Amada Más Que Nunca =

Amada más que nunca

Studio album by Daniela Romo
- Released: 1991
- Recorded: 1991
- Genre: Latin pop
- Label: EMI
- Producer: Bebu Silvetti; K.C. Porter

Daniela Romo chronology
Quiero Amanecer con Alguien (1989)	Amada más que nunca (1991)	De Mil Colores (1992)

Amada más que nunca (English Beloved more than ever) is the seventh studio album by Mexican pop singer Daniela Romo. This album was released on 1991. The album received a Grammy Award nomination for Best Latin Pop Performance, which it lost to Vikki Carr's Cosas del Amor; and was also nominated for Pop Album of the Year at the Lo Nuestro Awards of 1992 and it is her most successful album to date.

== History ==
This is the second production with Bebu Silvetti and K.C. Porter, it has songs from several songwriters like Lolita de la Colina, Las Diego, Luis Angel, Adrián Posse, Amparo Rubín, Romo and Silvetti, among others, and the song "Tampoco fuiste tú" (Neither was you) was written by the Mexican actress María Teresa Rivas as gift to Daniela. The first track to be released was the title track, which peaked within the top ten in Mexico. The following single, "Todo, Todo, Todo", became one of Romo's greatest hits, peaking at number-one in Mexico and the United States. "Nadie Entiende", "Duele", and "Tampoco Fuiste Tu", became top ten hits for Romo in the United States (Hot Latin Tracks chart).

== Track listing ==
Tracks:

1. Amada más que nunca
2. Ruleta rusa
3. Nadie entiende
4. Te comparo
5. Añicos
6. Un pretexto
7. Todo, todo, todo
8. Duele
9. En todo momento sólo tuya
10. Te olvidaré
11. Una herida en el alma
12. Tampoco fuiste tú
13. Díselo

== Singles ==
- Duele
- Todo, Todo, Todo
- Nadie entiende
- Tampoco fuiste tú
- Amada más que nunca

=== Singles charts ===
- "Duele" reached #7 on Hot Latin Songs.
- "Todo, todo, todo" #1
- "Nadie entiende" reached #6 on Hot Latin Songs.
- "Tampoco fuiste tú" reached #5 on Hot Latin Songs.
- "Amada más que nunca"

== Album chart ==
This was the second album of Daniela to hit the #1 in Billboard Latin Pop Albums staying for 8 non-consecutive weeks.

== Certifications ==
Region	Certification
Argentina	Gold
Mexico	Gold
Venezuela	Gold

== See also ==
- List of number-one Billboard Latin Pop Albums from the 1990s
