= Ave Fénix =

Studio album by Daniela Romo
- Released: 2001
- Recorded: 2001
- Genre: Pop; electronic; dance
- Label: Ariola; BMG
- Producer: Daniela Romo; Loris Ceroni

Daniela Romo chronology
Me Vuelves Loca (1999)	Ave Fénix (2001)	Es la Nostalgia (2005)

Ave Fénix (English The Phoenix) is the 11th studio album by Mexican pop singer Daniela Romo. It was released in the year of 2001. This was seen as an edgy and daring move by the public, making a significant departure from the usual material of career, with sounds very similar to artists like Kylie Minogue and Madonna, but it was a commercial failure due to the poor promotion by Daniela's team and her compromises with the telenovela El Manantial.

== History ==
A production by Romo and Miguel Bosé's producer Loris Ceroni, all the tracks were written primarily by herself. It has new versions of her greatest hits: "Quiero amanecer con alguien" (I want to wake up with someone), "De mí enamórate" (Fall in love with me) and "Yo no te pido la luna" (I don't ask you for the moon). This project was mainly inspired by Cher's comeback effort Believe, adopting her smooth vocals with dance beats. It was largely ignored because Romo would go on to do telenovelas instead of promoting it.

== Track listing ==
1. "Te quiero mi amor"
2. "Sombras amantes"
3. "Atarte a mi corazón"
4. "El ayer"
5. "Run run (Corre riesgos)"
6. "Ave fénix"
7. "Piensa en mí"
8. "Llévame"
9. "Soledad sin fin"
10. "Somos solo dos"
11. "Las heridas"
12. "Quiero amanecer con alguien" (New version)
13. "De Mí Enamórate" (New version)
14. "Yo no te pido la luna" (New version)

== Credits ==
- Loris Ceroni: Piano, Arranger, Keyboards, bajo sexto, Mastering, Mixing, Realization, Recording
- Alberto Mantovani: Piano, Arranger, Keyboards
- Cesar Ramirez: Assistant
- Daniela Romo: Producer, Liner Notes, Adaptation
