= Quiero Amanecer con Alguien =

Studio album by Daniela Romo
- Released: 1989
- Recorded: 1989
- Genre: Latin ballad
- Label: EMI International
- Producers: Bebu Silvetti; K.C. Porter

Daniela Romo chronology
Gitana (1987)	Quiero Amanecer con Alguien (1989)	Amada más que nunca (1991)

Quiero Amanecer con Alguien (English I want to wake up with someone) is the 6th studio album by Mexican pop singer Daniela Romo. Released on 1989 and nominated for Pop Album of the Year at the Lo Nuestro Awards, this was a departure from the catchy pop nature of her previous albums through adopting a more serious image and concentrated mainly on ballads.

== History ==
This was the first album produced by Bebu Silvetti and K.C. Porter for Daniela. A meaningful change in her career, she finished recording the albums in a 1980s style and started an era of romantic ballads with a fresher and newer sound.

== Track listing ==
Tracks:

1. Quiero amanecer con alguien
2. La última en tu vida
3. Explórame
4. Nada me falta nada me sobra
5. Balada por un amor
6. Una vez más
7. Y cae la gota de agua
8. Solo siempre tú
9. Dímelo
10. Desnuda
11. La Guirnalda

== Singles ==
- Quiero amanecer con alguien
- Dímelo
- Explórame
- Balada por un amor

=== Singles charts ===
- "Quiero amanecer con alguien" reached #2 on Hot Latin Songs.
- "Dímelo" reached #3 on Hot Latin Songs.
- "Explórame" reached #4 on Hot Latin Songs.
- "balada por un amor"reached #15 on Hot Latin Songs

== Album chart ==
This was the first album of Daniela's to hit the #1 in Billboard Latin Pop Albums staying for 5 non-consecutive weeks.

== Sales ==
Region	Certification	Certified units/sales
Mexico	—	1,000,000

== See also ==
- List of number-one Billboard Latin Pop Albums from the 1990s
