= Non voglio mica la luna =

Single by Fiordaliso

from the album Non voglio mica la luna
- B-side: "Un tipo"
- Released: February 1984
- Label: Durium
- Songwriters: Zucchero Fornaciari, Luigi Albertelli, Enzo Malepasso
- Producers: Luigi Albertelli, Enzo Malepasso

Fiordaliso singles chronology
"Oramai" (1983)	"Non voglio mica la luna" (1984)	"Li-be-llu-la" (1984)

Audio
- "Non voglio mica la luna" on YouTube

"Non voglio mica la luna" (transl. "I don't really ask for the moon") is a 1984 song composed by Zucchero Fornaciari, Luigi Albertelli and Enzo Malepasso, arranged by Vince Tempera and performed by Fiordaliso. The song premiered at the 34th edition of the Sanremo Music Festival, where it ranked fifth. It is Fiordaliso's signature song and her main commercial success.

== Track listing ==
- 7" single
1. "Non voglio mica la luna" (Zucchero Fornaciari, Luigi Albertelli, Enzo Malepasso)
2. "Un tipo" (Luigi Albertelli, Enzo Malepasso)

== Charts ==
=== Weekly charts ===
Weekly chart performance for "Non voglio mica la luna"
Chart (1984)	Peak position
Italy (Musica e dischi)	3

=== Year-end charts ===
Chart (1984)	Peak position
Italy (Musica e dischi)	34

== Cover versions ==
The same year Daniela Romo adapted the lyrics in Spanish and included her version of the song, "Yo No Te Pido La Luna", in her album Amor prohibido; her version was a massive success in Latin America.

Other Spanish-language cover versions of the song include those by Javiera Mena on her album Esquemas Juveniles; Sergio Dalma (who performed the song in a duet version with Romo during the 2012 Latin Grammy Awards), Diego Verdaguer, Pastora Soler, Soledad Pastorutti and MYA, as well as a Spanish version performed by Fiordaliso herself.
