= José Reymundi =

Puerto Rican actor

José Reymundí
- Born: July 13, 1940; Río Grande, Puerto Rico
- Died: October 7, 2017 (aged 77); San Juan, Puerto Rico
- Occupation: actor

José Reymundí (July 13, 1940 – October 7, 2017) was a Puerto Rican Telenovela and stage actor.

== Early years ==
José Reymundi who was popularly known as Pepe, was born on July 31, 1940, in the town of Rio Grande, Puerto Rico. While studying in the public schools of Rio Grande in the 1950s, Reymundí traveled to Cuba during the revolution and participated in the resistance in favor of Fidel Castro. He worked alongside his father in the family furniture store and the Don Q rum distillery, but he continued to perform in the theater.

== Acting career ==
After finishing his studies in Puerto Rico, José Reymundí moved to Mexico City, Mexico where he studied theater at the Cinematographic, Theatrical and Radio and Television Institute, better known as the Andrés Soler Instituted. He returned to Puerto Rico and joined an acting academy run by Edmundo Rivera Álvarez. In 1961 Reymundi debuted on television in the "Teatro Carnation" show on Telemundo canal 2. In 1962 he joined the Puerto Rico National Guard and stepped away from acting for six months due to training requirements.

In the 1970s, Tommy Muñiz recruited him to do telenovelas but n 1973 he started a strike against Tommy Muñiz because Tommy hired Cuban actor Héctor Travieso to start in the telenovela "Marta" and did not consider him for the role. A couple of years later he went back to work for Muñiz as a comedian joining the cast of the shows "Ja Ja, Ji Ji, Jo Jo con Agrelot", "Esto no tiene nombre" and "La criada Malcriada". Reymundí did stage acting from 1966 to 1999. He also worked for Manolo Urquiza, rejoining Telemundo and working on the melodramas produced by Angel del Cerro.

=== Telenovelas (soap operas) ===
- "Marta Lloréns"
- "Tanairí"
- "Viernes social"
- "Alejandra"
- "Andrea"
- "Pacto de amor"
- "Apartamento de solteras"

== Death ==
José Reymundí suffered from Alzheimer's, he died on October 7, 2007, in San Juan, Puerto Rico at the age of 77
