= Sortilegio =

Mexican telenovela

- Genre: Telenovela
- Based on: Tú o nadie by María Zarattini
- Written by: Claudia Velazco
- Directed by: Mónica Miguel; Karina Duprez
- Starring: Jacqueline Bracamontes; William Levy; Daniela Romo; Gabriel Soto; Chantal Andere; Ana Brenda Contreras; David Zepeda
- Theme music composer: Denisse de Kalafe
- Opening theme: "Sortilegio" performed by Il Divo
- Country of origin: Mexico
- Original language: Spanish
- No. of episodes: 90

Production
- Executive producer: Carla Estrada
- Producers: Guillermo Gutiérrez; Arturo Lorca
- Editors: Víctor Hugo Flores; Israel Flores
- Camera setup: Multi-camera
- Production company: Televisa

Original release
- Network: Canal de las Estrellas
- Release: June 1 – October 9, 2009

Related
- Mañana es para siempre; Corazón salvaje; Acapulco, cuerpo y alma (1995–1996)

Sortilegio (literally "Sortilege", "Love Spell" in English-speaking markets) is a Mexican telenovela produced by Carla Estrada, in her final telenovela for Televisa in 2009. and stars Jacqueline Bracamontes and William Levy as main protagonists, while David Zepeda, Chantal Andere, Otto Sirgo, Azela Robinson, Julián Gil and Ana Brenda Contreras are playing main villains/antagonists of the story.

From October 6, 2009, to February 17, 2010, Univisión broadcast Sortilegio weeknights at 9 pm/8c replacing Mañana es para siempre. The last episode was broadcast on February 17, 2010, with Corazón salvaje replacing it on February 22, 2010. From July 30 to September 7, 2012, Univision broadcast 2 hour reruns of Sortilegio weekdays at 1 pm/12c, replacing Corazón apasionado. From September 10 to October 19, 2012, reruns of Sortilegio were broadcast at 2 pm/1c. The last episode was broadcast on October 19, 2012, with Cuidado con el ángel replacing it on October 22, 2012. This telenovela is a remake of Tú o nadie.

As of November 24, 2014, for the first time Galavisión. is debuting Sortilegio at 11 am/10c, replacing one hour of Amor Real.

As of December 7, 2015 - April 15, 2016 TL Novelas broadcast 11:00, 17:00 and 23:00 replacing Alma de hierro, with Fuego en la sangre replacing it the April 18.

As of March 21, 2016, for the first time UniMás. is debuting Sortilegio at 1 pm/12c, 2 hour of special.

== Plot ==
Victoria had an affair with her husband Samuel's friend, Antonio Lombardo, resulting in the birth of twins, Bruno and Raquel. Antonio also had a son, Alejandro, with his wife Adriana. After their respective spouses died, they reunited and got married. However, they didn't tell their children that they are half-siblings, as that would reveal their infidelities. Instead they raised their children to recognize each other as step-siblings.

Years pass, and Bruno comes to be an irresponsible man who does not respect laws. Alejandro, on the other hand, is very responsible. Antonio prefers Alejandro over Bruno and decides that Alejandro should inherit his money when he dies. Antonio and Victoria have a meeting at Bruno's high school about Bruno's behavior and are told that he is expelled. While leaving the school, Antonio is run over and killed. Bruno upon learning that Antonio left everything to Alejandro comes up with a plan to pretend to be Alejandro and marry Maria Jose, a sweet innocent girl and then kill Alejandro. Making Maria Jose a very rich widow. When news comes of Alejandro's death Maria Jose and her sister Paula travel to Merida for the funeral. Maria Jose is heart broken to learn that Alejandro has died. However, she also learns that the man she fell in love with is named Bruno and not Alejandro. Maria Jose is furious to learn that Bruno tricked her and wants nothing to do with his evil plan. Bruno then threatens to send her father to prison if she doesn't pretend to be Alejandro's widow. Maria Jose is trapped and reluctantly accepts to deceive everyone into believing that she did get married with Alejandro. Just as Bruno thinks he has gotten away with his plan, Alejandro returns alive and shocked to learn that his family thinks that he married Maria Jose. Alejandro must then discover the truth about his supposed marriage to Maria Jose, who he is slowly falling in love with. Thus begins a story of intrigue, sibling hatred and rivalry, two sons in love with and fighting for the love of the same women, corporate espionage, and twin sisters torn apart by circumstance.

== Cast ==
=== Starring ===
- Jacqueline Bracamontes as María José Samaniego de Lombardo / Sandra Betancourt
- William Levy as Alejandro Lombardo
- Daniela Romo as Victoria de Lombardo
- Gabriel Soto as Fernando Alanís
- Chantal Andere as Raquel Albéniz
- Ana Brenda Contreras as Maura Albarrán
- David Zepeda as Bruno Albéniz

=== Also starring ===
- Mónica Miguel as Maya San Juan
- Otto Sirgo as Jorge Kruguer
- Aarón Hernán as Porfirio Betancourt
- Patricio Castillo as Emiliano Alanís
- Azela Robinson as Elena Miranda de Kruguer
- Luis Couturier as Hernán Plascencia
- Héctor Sáez as Pedro Samaniego
- Marcelo Córdoba as Roberto Castelar
- Julián Gil as Ulises Villaseñor
- Daniela Luján as Lisette Albarrán
- Guillermo Zarur as Ezequiel Flores
- Adalberto Parra as Erick Díaz
- Wendy González as Paula Samaniego
- Manuela Ímaz as Katia Alanís
- Rosita Pelayo as Meche Brito
- Arturo Lorca as Arturo
- Carlos Giron as Gabriel Brito
- Iliana de la Garza as Julia Fernández
- Rolando Fernández as Gregorio Diez
- Dolores Oliva as Piedad
- Christina Pastor as Mary
- José Carlos Ruiz as Chucho Gavira
- María Victoria as Felipa García

=== Recurring ===
- Fernando Allende as Antonio Lombardo
- Felicia Mercado as Adriana Villavicencio de Lombardo
- Mauricio Aspe as Fabián Lombardo
- Alejandro Durán as Aníbal
- Elizabeth Álvarez as Irene
- Pablo Valentín as Delegado
- Alejandro Tomasi as Samuel Albeniz
