= Daniela Romo (album) =

Studio album by Daniela Romo
- Released: 1983
- Recorded: March–April 1983
- Studio: Hispavox
- Genre: Latin pop
- Label: EMI Music
- Producer: Danilo Vaona

Daniela Romo chronology
| Daniela Romo (1983) | Amor Prohibido (1984) |

Daniela Romo is the debut album by Mexican pop singer Daniela Romo, released in 1983. A previous album had been released in 1979, but it was not promoted nor commercially significant, and it is not considered her debut. This album had a commercial appeal targeted to teenagers and young adults with catchy pop songs and was a big success in Latin America.

== History ==
To critics and fans, this is seen as Romo's debut, as the real first album did not meet with any success (critical or otherwise), and few know of its existence. She debuted as a writer on several songs. Danilo Vaona wrote "Mentiras" ("Lies"); another prominent singer who wrote for her was Miguel Bosé on the song "Pobre secretaria" ("Poor Secretary").

== Track listing ==
1. "Mentiras"
2. "La ocasión para amarnos"
3. "Te amo"
4. "Celos"
5. "El fin de un amor"
6. "Pobre secretaria"
7. "Ayúdame"
8. "Ven a mi fiesta"
9. "No no puedo ya dejarte"
10. "Ayer perdí mi corazón"

== Singles ==
- "Mentiras"
- "La ocasión para amarnos"
- "Celos"

== Covers ==
- Singer Fanny Lu covered the song "Celos" for her 2009 album Dos.

== Commercial performance ==
The album achieved commercial success, selling 300,000 copies in Mexico during 1983 alone. The single "Mentiras" also sold 100,000 units in Romo's native country by May 1984.

== Sales ==
| Region | Certification | Certified units/sales |
|---|---|---|
| Mexico (AMPROFON) | 2× Gold | 300,000 |
