= Te quiero (film) =

Te Quiero
- Directed by: Tito Davison
- Written by: Fernando Galiana; Ramón Obón
- Produced by: CONACINE
- Starring: Fernando Allende; Daniela Romo; Joaquín Cordero
- Cinematography: Gabriel Figueroa
- Edited by: Carlos Savage
- Music by: Gustavo C. Carrión
- Distributed by: CONACINE
- Release date: 1979
- Running time: 90 minutes
- Country: Mexico
- Language: Spanish

Te Quiero (English: I love you) is a Mexican motion picture categorized as drama and romance. It was filmed in 1978 and released in 1979.

== Synopsis ==
Claudia is an administrator in the successful company of her father. When he realizes his daughter is ill from leukemia, he plans a trip for her to the Caribbean Sea, so she can enjoy her last days. Her father hires a man to accompany his daughter. Eventually, they fall in love and she realizes the truth about her illness. She walks away, but was already in love.

== Cast ==
- Fernando Allende
- Daniela Romo
- Joaquín Cordero
- Blanca Sánchez
- Evangelina Elizondo
- Pedro Galván
- Yogi Ruge
- José Nájera
- Luis Uribe
- Abel Casillas
- Verónica Fernández
- Fernando Pinkus
