= Dueña de Mi Corazón =

Dueña de mi Corazón

Studio album by Daniela Romo
- Released: 1985
- Recorded: 1985
- Genre: Latin pop
- Label: EMI Music
- Producer: Danilo Vaona

Daniela Romo chronology
Amor Prohibido (1984)	Dueña de mi Corazón (1985)	Mujer de todos, Mujer de nadie (1986)

Dueña de mi Corazón (English I'm the owner of my heart) is the third studio album by Mexican pop singer Daniela Romo. The album was released in 1985.

== History ==
An album produced by Danilo Vaona. It has several hits: "Abuso" (Abuse) written by Juan Gabriel, "Dueña de mi corazón" (I'm the owner of my heart). "Prometes"(You pledge) written by Victor Manuel Olivas. It also includes the track "Es nuestro amor" (It's our love) that Daniela performed at the Yamaha Music Festival and written by Denise De Kalafe.

== Track listing ==
Tracks:

1. Abuso
2. Dueña de mi corazón
3. Mi perdición
4. Ahora tú
5. Más vale un hombre
6. No puedo creer
7. Lástima
8. Es nuestro amor
9. Prometes
10. Amor con amor se paga

== Singles ==
- Abuso
- Dueña de mi corazón
- Promotes

== Album chart ==
This release reached the #15 position in Billboard Latin Pop Albums.
