= Gitana (album) =

Studio album by Daniela Romo
- Released: 1987
- Recorded: 1987
- Genre: Latin pop
- Label: EMI
- Producer: Miguel Blasco; Gian Pietro Felisatti

Daniela Romo chronology
Mujer de todos, Mujer de nadie (1986)	Gitana (1987)	Quiero Amanecer con Alguien (1989)

Gitana (English Gypsy) is the fifth studio album by Mexican pop singer Daniela Romo. It was released in 1987. Like her previous albums, it was also a great success for her career, with several, of the songs making an impact on the Latin billboard charts.

== History ==
This is a production from Gian Pietro Felisatti and Miguel Blasco. It was recorded in Italy and Spain. It has songs written by Juan Gabriel, José María Purón, Armando Manzanero and Pablo Pinilla, among others. The title track was written by Daniela with Felisatti, and "Hay un sitio libre en mi corazón" (There's a spot free in my heart) Romo's second duet with Mijares.

== Track listing ==
Tracks:

1. Es mejor perdonar
2. Diez minutos de amor
3. Lo que las mujeres callamos
4. Tanto esperar por tí
5. Gitana
6. Hay un sitio libre en mi corazón (Duet with Mijares)
7. Ese momento
8. El poder del amor
9. El diablo en mi tejado
10. Cuando empieza el amor

=== Singles ===
- "Gitana" reached #12 on Hot Latin Songs.
- "Es mejor perdonar" reached #6 on Hot Latin Songs.
- "Hay un sitio libre en mi corazón"

== Certifications ==
Region	Certification	Certified units/sales
Mexico (AMPROFON)	Gold	100,000^{^}
^{^} Shipments figures based on certification alone.
