= Amor Prohibido (Daniela Romo album) =

Studio album by Daniela Romo
- Released: May 18, 1984
- Recorded: 1984
- Genre: Pop
- Label: EMI Music
- Producer: Danilo Vaona

Daniela Romo chronology
Daniela Romo (1983)	Amor Prohibido (1984)	Dueña de mi Corazón (1985)

Amor Prohibido (English Forbidden Love) is the second studio album by Mexican pop singer Daniela Romo. This album was released on May 18, 1984.

== History ==
This album was produced by Danilo Vaona, it has the Spanish version hit "Yo no te pido la luna" (I don't ask you for the moon) of the Italian song "Non voglio mica la luna" by the singer Fiordaliso. It also includes the song "Ay, ay, ay" (Ouch, ouch, ouch) written by José Luis Perales and he participates in the background vocals, "Hoy te he visto en la terraza del bar" (Today I've seen you in the terrace of a bar) by José María Cano and "La fuerza de un hombre" (The strength of a man) by Gonzalo. All other tracks were written by Daniela and Danilo Vaona.

== Track listing ==
Tracks:

1. Yo no te pido la luna
2. Ya no somos amantes
3. Sola
4. Amor Prohibido
5. Una canción
6. Jóvenes
7. La fuerza de un hombre
8. Solamente amigas
9. Cadenas
10. Enamorada de ti
11. Ay, ay, ay
12. Hoy te he visto en la terraza de un bar

== Singles ==
- Yo no te pido la luna
- Ay, ay, ay
- Ya no somos amantes
- Enamorada de ti

== Certifications ==
Region	Certification	Certified units/sales
Mexico (AMPROFON)	Gold	100,000^{^}
^{^} Shipments figures based on certification alone.
