= Me Vuelves Loca =

Studio album by Daniela Romo
- Released: 1999
- Recorded: 1999
- Genre: Bolero; ranchera
- Label: Mercury, Universal Music

Daniela Romo chronology
| Un Nuevo Amor (1996) | Me Vuelves Loca (1999) | Ave Fénix (2001) |

Me Vuelves Loca (English You drive me crazy) is the 10th studio album by Mexican pop singer Daniela Romo that finished a decade. This is a mix of romantic ballads, boleros and rancheras produced by Bebu Silvetti. It has her own version of the song "Quisiera decir tu nombre" (I'd like to call your name) of José Luis Perales and the song that gives the name of the title was written by Armando Manzanero and recorded as duet with Joan Manuel Serrat.

== Track listing ==
Tracks:

1. "Miénteme"
2. "Tu eres mi destino"
3. "Alma corazón y vida"
4. "Y háblame"
5. "Poquito a poquito"
6. "Me vuelves loca" (Duet with Joan Manuel Serrat)
7. "Otra vez"
8. "Caminito"
9. "Imágenes"
10. "Mio, siempre mio"
11. "Una noche contigo"
12. "Quisiera decir tu nombre"
