= Alborada (TV series) =

Mexican TV drama

- Lucero, Fernando Colunga and Valentino Lanús
- Also known as: Alborada, el amanecer del amor
- Genre: Telenovela; Romance; Drama
- Written by: María Zarattini; Guenia Argomedo; Edwin Valencia
- Directed by: Monica Miguel; Sergio Quintero; Jorge Édgar Ramírez
- Starring: Lucero; Fernando Colunga; Daniela Romo; Arturo Peniche; Ernesto Laguardia
- Opening theme: "Alborada" by Plácido Domingo
- Country of origin: Mexico
- Original language: Spanish
- No. of episodes: 90

Production
- Executive producer: Carla Estrada
- Producers: Arturo Lorca; Guillermo Gutiérrez
- Production locations: Televisa San Ángel; Mexico City, Mexico
- Cinematography: Alejandro Frutos; Bernardo Nájera; Carlos Sánchez Ross
- Camera setup: Multi-camera
- Running time: 41-44 minutes
- Production company: Televisa

Original release
- Network: Canal de las Estrellas
- Release: October 24, 2005 – February 24, 2006

Alborada (English: The Dawning) is a Mexican telenovela produced by Carla Estrada for Televisa in 2005. It is a historical drama set in colonial Panama and Mexico a few years before the Mexican Independence from Spain.

On Monday, October 24, 2005, Canal de las Estrellas started broadcasting Alborada weekdays at 9:00pm, replacing La esposa virgen. The last episode was broadcast on Friday, February 24, 2006 with La verdad oculta replacing it on Monday, February 27, 2006.

The series stars Lucero, Fernando Colunga, Daniela Romo, Arturo Peniche and Ernesto Laguardia.

== Plot ==
Maria Hipólita Díaz is a young woman who lives in Panama with her husband, Antonio, and her mother-in-law, Adelaida. Antonio suffered from sexual abuses when he was a child, so he isn't able to consummate his marriage.

Adelaida wants to have a grandchild, as Antonio will not inherit the fortune of his uncle, Próspero, unless he sires a son.

Luis Manrique y Arellano is a noble Mexican who came to Santa Rita to close a deal under orders from his cousin Diego, the Count of Guevara, without knowing that the trip was a pretext to have him killed.

When Luis is captured by Adelaida's servants while fleeing from justice, she orders him to take Antonio's place in Hipólita's bed, or she'll turn him over to the authorities.

So Luis goes to Hipólita's bedroom, intending to escape from a window. It's very dark, she awakes upon hearing him try to escape, she doesn't see him very well and she believes he is her husband.

He has sex with her to keep her quiet, and then makes good his escape. But before he leaves, Hipólita discovers that this man isn't her husband, but an escaped prisoner.

Luis departs, without Hipólita seeing his face or knowing his name – but Luis knows hers. She is furious with her mother-in-law for what she has done, but she can't change what happened.

Some weeks later, Hipólta finds out that she is pregnant with Luis's child, so she decides to leave home with her maid, Adalgisa, and go to Mexico, where her family lives.

There, she has her child, Rafael, and finds her mother and her sister, but they aren't very thrilled to see her. Hipólita was Asunción's illegitimate daughter, so she sent the girl to Panama to be raised by her grandmother, so that no one in Mexico could know that she had a daughter outside of wedlock.

When Hipólita arrives in Mexico, she has to fight against her stepfather's hate and her mother's desperation when she finds out that there's another bastard in the family.

Luis also lives in Mexico: he is a rich man, cousin of the count of Guevara, and there is much mystery about his relationship with his mother, Juana, who appears to hate her own son and support the count against him at every turn.

Hipólita and Luis meet again and, although she doesn't recognize him, he recognizes her and he suspects that the child that Hipólita has with her is also his son.

They don't get on very well initially, but later, they fall in love with each other. Luis feels that he has to tell her that he is her son's father, but he can't do this, because if he did, Hipólita would hate him.

The eventual recognition of Rafael as Luis's son, the reason why Luis's mother detests him, and the plots of the Count of Guevara against Luis are played out against the background of Luis's and Hipólita's attempts to be together.

== Cast ==
=== Main cast ===
- Lucero as María Hipólita Díaz Montero de Guzmán
- Fernando Colunga as Luis Manrique y Arellano
- Daniela Romo as Juana Arellano Vda. de Manrique
- Arturo Peniche as Antonio de Guzmán y Pantoja
- Ernesto Laguardia as Cristóbal de Lara Montemayor y Robles

=== Supporting cast ===
- Irán Castillo as Catalina Escobar Díaz Montero
- Valentino Lanus as Martín Alvarado Solares
- Alejandro Tommasi as Felipe Alvarado
- Manuel Ojeda as Francisco Escobar
- Olivia Bucio as Asunción Díaz Montero de Escobar
- Luis Roberto Guzmán as Diego Arellano y Mendoza, Count of Guevara
- Vanessa Guzmán as Perla López
- Zully Montero as Adelaida Pantoja Vda. de Guzmán
- Mariana Karr as Isabel Manrique de Leiva
- Mariana Garza as Esperanza de Corsa Carmona de Manrique
- Robertha as Paula
- Sherlyn as Marina
- Monica Miguel as Modesta
- Gilberto de Anda as Amílcares Gasca
- Beatriz Moreno as Adalgisa "Ada" Sánchez
- José Luis Reséndez as Andrés Escobar y Fuenterilla
- Patricia Martínez as Carmela Solares de Alvarado
- Archie Lafranco as Rodrigo de Rivera
- Arturo Vázquez as Ramón Fuentes
- Lucero Lander as Sister Teresa de Lara Montemayor y Robles
- Analia del Mar as Mirtha
- Marcelo Córdoba as Marcos López
- Susana Lozano as Bernarda
- Gabriel de Cervantes as Lázaro
- Rudy Casanova as Fermín
- Edgardo Eliezer as Vicente
- Benjamín Pineda as Aurelio
- María Rojo as Victoria Mancera y Oviedo Vda. de Valdés
- Aurora Clavel as Cleotilde
- Rosa María Bianchi as Magdalena de Iturbe y Pedroza
- Magda Guzmán as Sara de Oviedo "The Mighty One"
- Lupita Lara as Rosario
- Humberto Dupeyrón as Próspero de Guzmán
- Rubén Cerda as Brother Gaspar
- Isaura Espinoza as Eusebia
- Justo Martínez as Brother Álvaro D'Acosta
- Mario Iván Martínez as Singer in brothel
- David Ostrosky as Agustín de Corsa
- Jan as Santiago de Corsa Carmona
- Eduardo Liñán as Captain Nicolás Pardo
- Julio Monterde as Archbishop
- Aarón Hernán as Anselmo Iturbe y Pedroza
- Adalberto Parra as Higinio
- Carlos Girón as Cirilo
- Alexander Renaud as Rafael Luis Diaz Montero Manrique y Arellano
- Rebeca Manríquez as Elvira Sandoval
- Cristina Pastor as Eloísa Iturralde
- Raúl Valerio as Malaquías Apodaca
- Antonio Medellín as Brother Pablo
- Magda Karina as Sara de Oviedo (young)
- Joana Brito as Landlady
- Amparo Garrido as Hipólita's employer
- María Dolores Oliva as María
- Benjamín Islas as Eliseo Ulloa

== Awards and nominations ==
Year	Award	Category	Nominee	Result
2005	TV Adicto Golden Awards	Best Costumes	Alborada	Won
2005	TV Adicto Golden Awards	Best Song	Alborada	Won
2005	TV Adicto Golden Awards	Best Special Performance	Zully Montero	Won
2005	TV Adicto Golden Awards	Best Actress in a Supporting Role	Mariana Garza	Won
2005	TV Adicto Golden Awards	Best Female Lead	Lucero	Won
2005	TV Adicto Golden Awards	Best Original Story	Alborada	Won
2005	TV Adicto Golden Awards	Best Production	Alborada	Won
2006	TVyNovelas Awards	Best Telenovela	Carla Estrada	Won
2006	TVyNovelas Awards	Best Actress	Lucero	Won
2006	TVyNovelas Awards	Best Actor	Fernando Colunga	Won
2006	TVyNovelas Awards	Best Antagonist Actress	Daniela Romo	Won
2006	TVyNovelas Awards	Best Antagonist Actor	Luis Roberto Guzmán	Nominated
2006	TVyNovelas Awards	Best Leading Actor	Manuel Ojeda	Won
2006	TVyNovelas Awards	Best Supporting Actress	Mariana Karr	Won
2006	TVyNovelas Awards	Best Supporting Actor	Ernesto Laguardia	Won
2006	TVyNovelas Awards	Best Young Lead Actress	Sherlyn	Nominated
2006	TVyNovelas Awards	Best Musical Theme	"Alborada" by Plácido Domingo	Nominated
2006	TVyNovelas Awards	Best Direction	Mónica Miguel	Nominated
2006	Bravo Awards	Best Telenovela	Carla Estrada	Won
2006	Bravo Awards	Best Actress	Lucero	Won
2006	Bravo Awards	Best Actor	Fernando Colunga	Won
2006	Bravo Awards	Best Antagonist Actress	Daniela Romo	Won
2006	Bravo Awards	Best Generic Actress	Mariana Karr	Won
2006	Bravo Awards	Best Generic Leading Actress	Mónica Miguel	Won
2006	Bravo Awards	Best Generic Leading Actor	Manuel Ojeda	Won
2006	Palmas de Oro Awards	Best Telenovela	Carla Estrada	Won
2006	Palmas de Oro Awards	Best Actress	Lucero	Won
2006	Palmas de Oro Awards	Best Actor	Fernando Colunga	Won
2006	Palmas de Oro Awards	Best Antagonist Actress	Daniela Romo	Won
2006	Palmas de Oro Awards	Best Antagonist Actor	Glberto de Anda	Won
2006	Califa de Oro Awards	Outstanding Production	Carla Estrada	Won
2006	Califa de Oro Awards	Outstanding Performance	Manuel Ojeda	Won
2006	Califa de Oro Awards	Outstanding Performance	María Rojo	Won
2006	Califa de Oro Awards	Outstanding Performance	Sherlyn	Won
2006	Califa de Oro Awards	Outstanding Performance	Valentino Lanús	Won
2006	Latin Emmy Awards	Best Telenovela Actress	Lucero	Won
2007	ACE Awards	Best Scenic Program	Alborada	Won
2007	ACE Awards	Best Actor	Fernando Colunga	Won
2007	ACE Awards	Best Director	Mónica Miguel	Won
2010	Golden Awards Of The Decade	Best Female Villain of the Decade	Daniela Romo	Won
