= De Mil Colores (Daniela Romo album) =

Studio album by Daniela Romo
- Released: 1992
- Recorded: 1992
- Genre: Latin pop; tropical
- Label: EMI Music
- Producer: Bebu Silvetti

Daniela Romo chronology
Amada más que nunca (1991)	De Mil Colores (1992)	Un Nuevo Amor (1996)

De Mil Colores (English In a thousand colors) is the eighth studio album by Mexican pop singer Daniela Romo. This album was released in 1992, and it was produced by Bebu Silvetti, and it was a slight departure from the Pop sound of her 1991 predecessor, borrowing tendencies from caribbean music, with tropical arrangements very similar to the ones presented on her 1991 hit "Todo Todo Todo" from her last album. This was the last project of Daniela with EMI Capitol. It is also the last album of Daniela that appears in three different formats: LP, cassette and CD. The album and its singles all enjoyed great success on the billboard charts, just like her previous albums, with three of the singles cracking the Top ten of Latin billboard.

== Track listing ==
Tracks:

1. De mil colores
2. En el espacio del placer
3. Para que te quedes conmigo
4. Lejos
5. Yo no se vivir sin ti
6. Átame a tu vida
7. Que vengan los bomberos
8. El día que te fuiste
9. Anestesia
10. A veces
11. Estoy pensando en cambiarte
12. Amor a contrapunto

== Singles ==
- "De mil colores" reached #30 on Hot Latin Songs.
- "Para que te quedes conmigo" reached #1 on Hot Latin Songs.
- "Que vengan los bomberos" reached #9 on Hot Latin Songs.
- "Átame a tu vida" reached #7 on Hot Latin Songs.

== Album charts ==
This album reached the position #10 in Billboard Latin Pop Albums.
