= Las vías del amor =

Television series

- Genre: Telenovela
- Screenplay by: Alejandro Pohlenz
- Story by: Emilio Larrosa
- Directed by: Salvador Garcini
- Starring: Aracely Arámbula; Jorge Salinas; Enrique Rocha; Daniela Romo
- Theme music composer: Martín Muñoz
- Opening theme: "Las vías del amor" performed by Aracely Arámbula
- Country of origin: Mexico
- Original language: Spanish
- No. of episodes: 220

Production
- Executive producer: Emilio Larrosa
- Producer: Arturo Pedoraza Loera
- Cinematography: Lino Gama
- Editors: Marco Rocha Maza; Alfredo Frutos; Pablo Peralta
- Camera setup: Multi-camera
- Running time: 45 minutes
- Production company: Televisa

Original release
- Network: Canal de las Estrellas
- Release: August 5, 2002 – June 6, 2003

Las vías del amor (The Tracks of Love) is a Mexican telenovela produced by Emilio Larrosa for Televisa in 2002.

The series stars Aracely Arámbula, Jorge Salinas, Enrique Rocha and Daniela Romo.

== Plot ==
Gabriel is an electronic engineer and former seminarian who is consumed with remorse and guilt; when he was a child he lost his brother Nicholas. That loss caused Gabriel's father a heart attack. His mother has never forgiven him for that.

Gabriel tried to purge his guilt in the priesthood, but left the seminary because of an affair with Sonia, a humble washerwoman. Gabriel never forgot Sonia, despite being in a relationship with Sandra who he does not love. Upon discovering that truth, Sandra attempts suicide. Adolfo, a millionaire and owner of a chain of nightclubs, is in love with Sandra. Gabriel returns to be with Sonia and discovers that she is working as a prostitute and offers to pay all her expenses, her mother’s treatment, and an apartment to make her quit being a prostitute. But Gabriel's true love is far away, in Tlacotalpan.

Perla is a young, cute, and poor waitress who is also a clairvoyant. Her powers let her know that her boyfriend Paco is in danger, but he ignores her. Paco is killed and Perla discovers through her visions that his killer has a tattoo of a skull on the arm. Elmer is an employee of Don Geronimo, the owner of many properties in Tlacotalpan and Perla's boss. Once discovered, Elmer blackmails Perla to accept the marriage proposal from Don Geronimo if she does not want him to kill her father. After Gonzalo, who is Paco's best friend, comes to where Perla lives, Gonzalo wants to find the assassin of his friend and he gets into some problems——one being that he is trafficking with Sebastian and Enrique. Additionally, he is also Elmer's enemy. Gonzalo tells Perla that Paco will protect Perla from Don Geronimo and Sebastian.

Perla accepts Don Geronimo's proposal who will show her a world of luxury and beauty which she always dreamed of. On a trip to Mexico City with her boyfriend Don Geronimo, Perla encounters Gabriel, who will be her true love.

The wedding takes place and, during the banquet, someone murders Don Geronimo. Enrique blames Fidel who flees to the Capital. Sick and penniless, Fidel is rescued by Leticia, a good, hardworking merchant who, by a twist of fate, is harassed and stalked by Sebastian, brother of Don Geronimo. Perla decides to go to the Capital to find her dad with the help from Gabriel, and the two slowly fall in love. But Sonia will make Perla's life miserable to win for Gabriel's love.

But these are not Perla's only problems. First is Sebastian, a criminal who seeks Perla and her father to avenge the death of his brother; there's also 'El Dandy', the pimp of Sonia, who Gabriel confronts in order to defend Sonia, and who now seeks revenge; and Enrique, the son of Don Geronimo who killed him because of the obsession he has with Perla; and he will not rest until he finds her.

== Cast ==
=== Starring ===
- Aracely Arámbula as Perla Gutiérrez Vázquez
- Jorge Salinas as Gabriel Quesada Barragán
- Enrique Rocha as Sebastián Mendoza Romero
- Daniela Romo as Leticia López Albavera
- José Carlos Ruiz as Fidel Gutiérrez Arismendi
- Julio Alemán as Alberto Betanzos
- Alfredo Adame as Ricardo Domínguez
- Nuria Bages as Olga Vázquez de Gutiérrez
- Abraham Ramos as Enrique Mendoza Santini
- Blanca Sánchez as Artemisa Barragán
- Sasha Montenegro as Catalina Valencia
- Gabriel Soto as Adolfo Lascuráin / Nicolás Quesada Barragán
- Julián Moreno as Gonzalo Correa / Franco Quesada Barragán

=== Also starring ===
- Dulce as Patricia Martínez de Betanzos
- Margarita Magaña as Alicia Betanzos Martínez
- Patricia Navidad as Rocío Zárate
- Rafael Amaya as Paco / Pablo Rivera
- Carlos Miguel as Adalberto Ruiz / El Dandy
- Mónica Dossetti as Mariela Andrade
- Rudy Casanova as Elmer Patiño / El Negro
- Raúl Ochoa as Ernesto Fernández Valencia
- Paola Treviño as Andrea De La Garza
- Eduardo Cuervo as Pedro Betanzos Martínez
- Francisco Avendaño as Javier Loyola Jr.
- Maricruz Nájera as Laura Albavera
- María Prado as Azalia Sánchez
- Thelma Tixou as Fernanda Solís
- Sergio DeFassio as Eloy Álvarez
- Carlos Torres as Edmundo Larios
- Ivonne Montero as Damiana / Madonna
- Arturo Vázquez as Iván Hernández
- Kokin Li as Wong / El Chino
- Bobby Larios as Julián de la Colina
- Julio Monterde as Javier Loyola
- Esperanza Rendón as Gladys Sánchez
- Anghel as Jéssica
- Gustavo Negrete as Aurelio Tobar
- Ricardo Vera as Tadeo Juárez Peña
- Teo Tapia as Leopoldo Dávalos
- Rubén Morales as Efraín
- Manuela Ímaz as Rosaura Fernández López
- Jorge Consejo as Esteban Fernández López
- Elizabeth Álvarez as Sonia "Francis" Vázquez Solís
- Miguel Loyo as Ramón Gutiérrez Vázquez
- Silvia Pinal as Vanessa Vázquez
- Hugo Aceves as Octavio Vázquez Solís
- Silvia Ramirez as Antonia
- Claudia Troyo as Claudia Jiménez
- Erika García as Lolita Padilla Vale
- Florencia del Saracho as Pamela Fernández

=== Recurring ===
- Juan Ángel Esparza as Carlos Velázquez
- Marco Méndez as Óscar Méndez
- Ricardo Margaleff as Bruno

== Awards and nominations ==
Year	Award	Category	Nominated	Result
2003	21st TVyNovelas Awards			
2003	21st TVyNovelas Awards	Best Telenovela	Emilio Larrosa	Nominated
2003	21st TVyNovelas Awards	Best Actress	Aracely Arámbula	Nominated
2003	21st TVyNovelas Awards	Best Actor	Jorge Salinas	Nominated
2003	21st TVyNovelas Awards	Best Antagonist Actress	Sasha Montenegro	Won
2003	21st TVyNovelas Awards	Best Antagonist Actor	Enrique Rocha	Won
2003	21st TVyNovelas Awards	Best Leading Actress	Daniela Romo	Nominated
2003	21st TVyNovelas Awards	Best Leading Actor	José Carlos Ruiz	Nominated
2003	21st TVyNovelas Awards	Best Supporting Actress	Nuria Bages	Nominated
2003	21st TVyNovelas Awards	Best Female Revelation	Manuela Ímaz	Nominated
2003	El Heraldo de México Awards			
2003	El Heraldo de México Awards	Best Actress	Daniela Romo	Won
2003	El Heraldo de México Awards	Best Actor	Enrique Rocha	Won
2003	El Heraldo de México Awards	Best Female Revelation	Elizabeth Álvarez	Won
2003	El Heraldo de México Awards	Best Male Revelation	Jorge Consejo	Won
2003	Palmas de Oro Awards	Best Antagonist Actor	Enrique Rocha	Won
2003	INTE Awards			
2003	INTE Awards	Production of the Year	Emilio Larrosa	Nominated
2003	INTE Awards	Actress of the Year	Aracely Arámbula	Nominated
2003	INTE Awards	Supporting Actress of the Year	Daniela Romo	Won
2003	INTE Awards	Supporting Actor of the Year	Enrique Rocha	Nominated
2003	INTE Awards	Screenwriter of the Year	Alejandro Polhenz	Nominated
