= Mujer de todos, Mujer de nadie =

Studio album by Daniela Romo
- Released: 1986
- Recorded: 1986
- Genre: Latin pop
- Label: EMI
- Producers: Miguel Blasco; J.R. Florez; Gian Pietro Felisatti

Daniela Romo chronology
Dueña de mi Corazón (1985)	Mujer de todos, Mujer de nadie (1986)	Gitana (1987)

Mujer de todos, Mujer de nadie (English: Everybody's Woman, Nobody's Woman) is the fourth studio album by Mexican pop singer Daniela Romo. This album was released in 1986 and it was her most successful album released in the 1980s, with the song De Mi Enamórate spending 14 weeks at #1 at the Hot Latin Tracks of Billboard, a record at the time.

== History ==
This album was released by the successful 1980s production team of Miguel Blasco, J.R. Florez and Gian Pietro Felisatti. It includes several songs written by Daniela. The album contains the song "Me alimento de tí" (You nourish me) written by Gonzalo Benavides and performed with Mijares. It also includes one of her greatest songs ever, the track "De mí enamórate" (Fall in love with me), the main theme from El Camino Secreto.

== Track listing ==
Tracks:

1. De mí enamórate
2. Veneno para dos
3. No no le creas
4. Coco loco
5. Me alimento de ti (Duet with Mijares)
6. Ayer pensé
7. Confesiones
8. Adelante corazón
9. La batalla del amor
10. Mujer de todos, mujer de nadie
11. Bastará
12. El mundo acabará

== Singles ==
- Coco loco
- Veneno para dos
- Me alimento de ti
- De mí enamórate

=== Singles charts ===
#	Title	U.S. Hot Lat.	ESP
1.	"De mí enamórate"	1	1
2.	"Coco loco"	41	2
3.	"Veneno para dos"	10	11
4.	"Me alimento de ti"	-	4

== Album chart ==
This release reached the #2 position in Billboard Latin Pop Albums.

== Certifications ==
Region	Certification	Certified units/sales
Spain (Promusicae)	Gold	50,000^{^}
^{^} Shipments figures based on certification alone.
