= No temas al amor =

- Daniela Romo & Enrique Novi
- Created by: Marissa Garrido
- Written by: Patricia Lozano
- Directed by: Aldo Monti
- Starring: Daniela Romo; Enrique Novi; Armando Silvestre
- Opening theme: No temas al amor by Daniela Romo
- Country of origin: Mexico
- Original language: Spanish
- No. of episodes: 20

Production
- Executive producer: Patricia Lozano
- Production company: Televisa

Original release
- Network: Canal de las Estrellas
- Release: 1980

No temas al amor (English title: Don't be afraid of love) is a telenovela made by Mexican TV network Televisa. This telenovela was broadcast in 1980. This soap opera was televised on weekends only.

== Plot ==
Alejandra (Daniela Romo) is a photographer who is afraid of the love from Raul Contreras (Enrique Novi), an orthopedist, because she is already engaged to Ernesto Millan, an incapacitated racing-driver. Marcos Dario (Armando Silvestre), the father of Alejandra, has a secret affair with Cristina (Chela Castro), the mother of Raul. Marcos Dario caused the financial ruin and suicide of Raul's father. Then Alejandra gets married and divorces Ernesto because he is rude and jealous. Cristina wants to take revenge on Marcos Dario for what happened on the past. Raul and Alejandra gets together, but he dies in a car accident and Alejandra will remain alone with their son.

== Cast ==
- Daniela Romo as Alejandra
- Enrique Novi as Raul
- Armando Silvestre as Marcos Dario
- Chela Castro as Cristina
- Antonio Valencia as Gerardo
- Félix Santaella as Raymundo
- Ana Laura as Socky
- Ernesto Marin as Carlos
- Carmen Delgado as Marcela
- Ana Silvia Garza as Martha
- Dolores Marti as Marga
- Graciela Lara as Gabriela
- Maribel Fernández as Alicia
- Alfonso Kafitti as Alfonso
- Alejandro Ciangherotti Jr. as Jacinto
