= Fiordaliso =

Italian singer (born 1956)

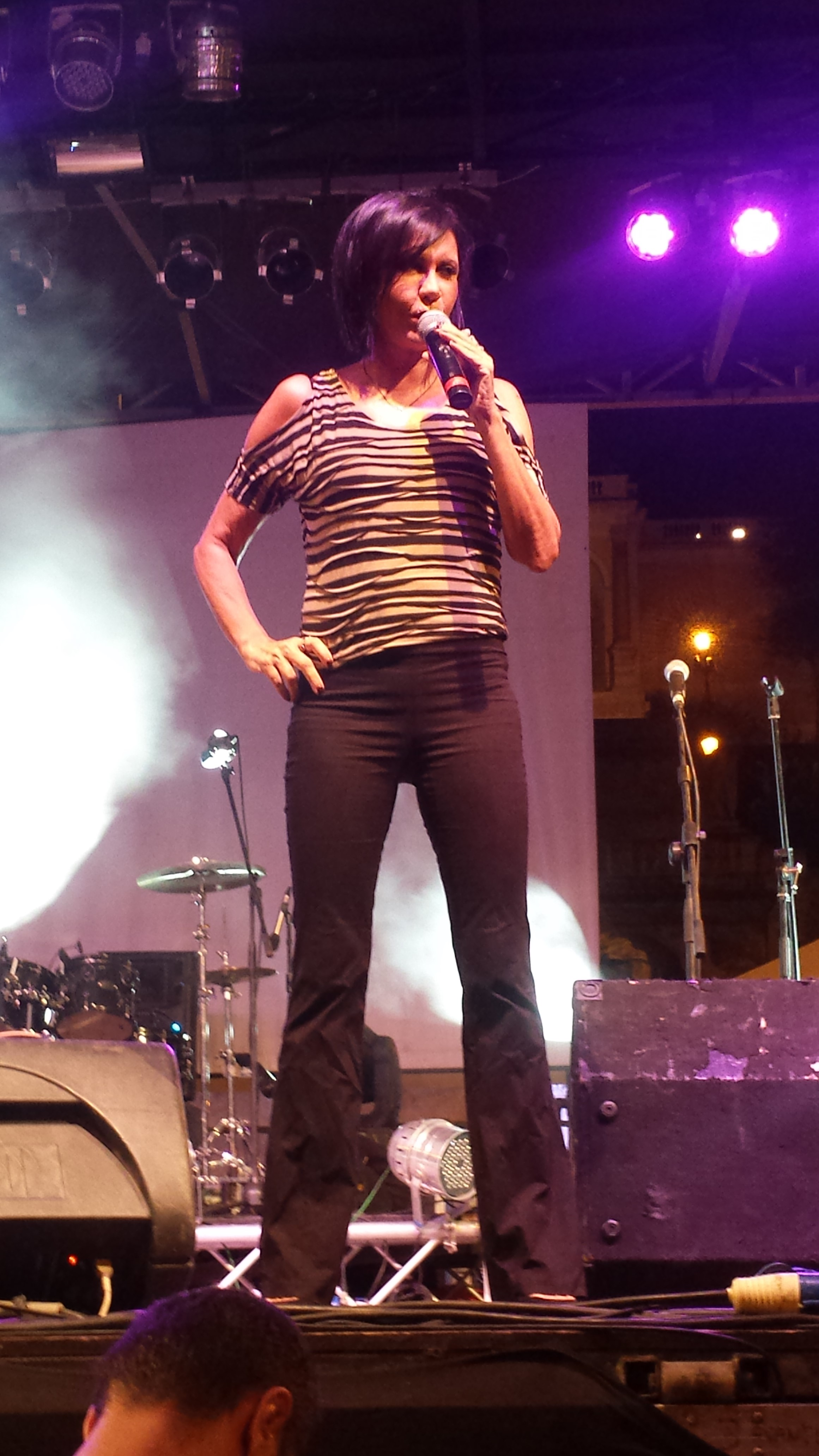
- Fiordaliso in concert in Rome in 2015

Background information
- Born: 19 February 1956 (age 70); Piacenza, Italy
- Genre: Pop rock
- Occupations: Singer; songwriter; musician
- Years active: 1981–present

Marina Fiordaliso (born 19 February 1956), known as simply Fiordaliso (Italian for 'cornflower'), is an Italian pop rock singer. During her career she has sold over 6 million records.

== Life and career ==
Born in Piacenza, the daughter of a drummer, Fiordaliso approached music at young age studying voice and piano. In 1981 she won the Castrocaro Music Festival with the song "Scappo via", and the following year she debuted at the Sanremo Music Festival with the rock ballad "Una sporca poesia". Her major successes, remarkably the songs "Oramai" and "Non voglio mica la luna" (written by Zucchero Fornaciari), are linked to the Sanremo Festival, in which she participated nine times between 1982 and 2002; outside the Festival, her main hit was the song "Cosa ti farei", one of the most successful songs of summer 1990 in Italy. In the second half of 1990s, Fiordaliso gradually moved away from the musical scene without ever abandoning it, and focused on the activities of stage actress and television presenter.

She has 2 children, Sebastiano (b. 1972) and Paolo (b. 1989).

== Discography ==
=== Singles ===
- 1982 – "Una sporca poesia"
- 1982 – "Maschera"
- 1983 – "Oramai"
- 1984 – "Non voglio mica la luna"
- 1984 – "Li-be-llu-la"
- 1985 – "Il mio angelo"
- 1985 – "Sola no, non ci sto"
- 1986 – "Fatti miei"
- 1986 – "La vita è molto di più"(with Pupo)
- 1987 – "Il canto dell'estate"
- 1988 – "Per noi"
- 1989 – "Se non avessi te"
- 1990 – "Cosa ti farei"
- 1991 – "Il mare più grande che c'è"
- 1991 – "Saprai" (with Roby Facchinetti)
- 1992 – "Dimmelo tu perché"
- 1997 – "Disordine mentale"
- 1998 – "Come si fa"
- 2000 – "Linda Linda" (Arabian song)
- 2003 – "Estate '83"
- 2007 – "Io muoio"
- 2008 – "M'amo non M'amo"
- 2009 – "Canto del sole inesauribile"

==== Foreign Singles ====
- 1984 – "Yo no te pido la luna"
- 1985 – "Sola no, yo no sé estar"
- 1985 - "Quando dormi"
- 1986 – "Desde hoy"
- 1986 - "Vive"
- 1991 – "I love you man (Il mare più grande che c'è)"
- 1991 – "El mar más grande que hay"
- 1991 – "Sabrás" (with Riccardo Fogli)
- 1991 – "Sposa di rosa"
- 1997 – "Como te amaré"

=== Albums ===
- 1983 – Fiordaliso
- 1984 – Non voglio mica la luna (reissue of the above, with the addition of "Non voglio mica la luna")
- 1984 – Discoquattro
- 1985 – A ciascuno la sua donna
- 1985 – Fiordaliso – Dal vivo per il mondo (live)
- 1986 – Applausi a Fiordaliso (reissue of the above, with the addition of "Fatti miei" and the removal of "You know my way" and "Sola no, yo no sé estar")
- 1987 – Fiordaliso
- 1989 – Io... Fiordaliso (collection with three new songs)
- 1990 – La vita si balla
- 1991 – Il portico di Dio
- 1992 – Io ci sarò
- 1994 – E adesso voglio la luna – I grandi successi (collection with two new songs and 9 remixes)
- 2002 – Risolutamente decisa (collection with three new songs and 9 remixes)
- 2004 – Come si fa (collection with two new songs)
