= Daniela Romo =

Mexican singer, actress and TV hostess (born 1959)

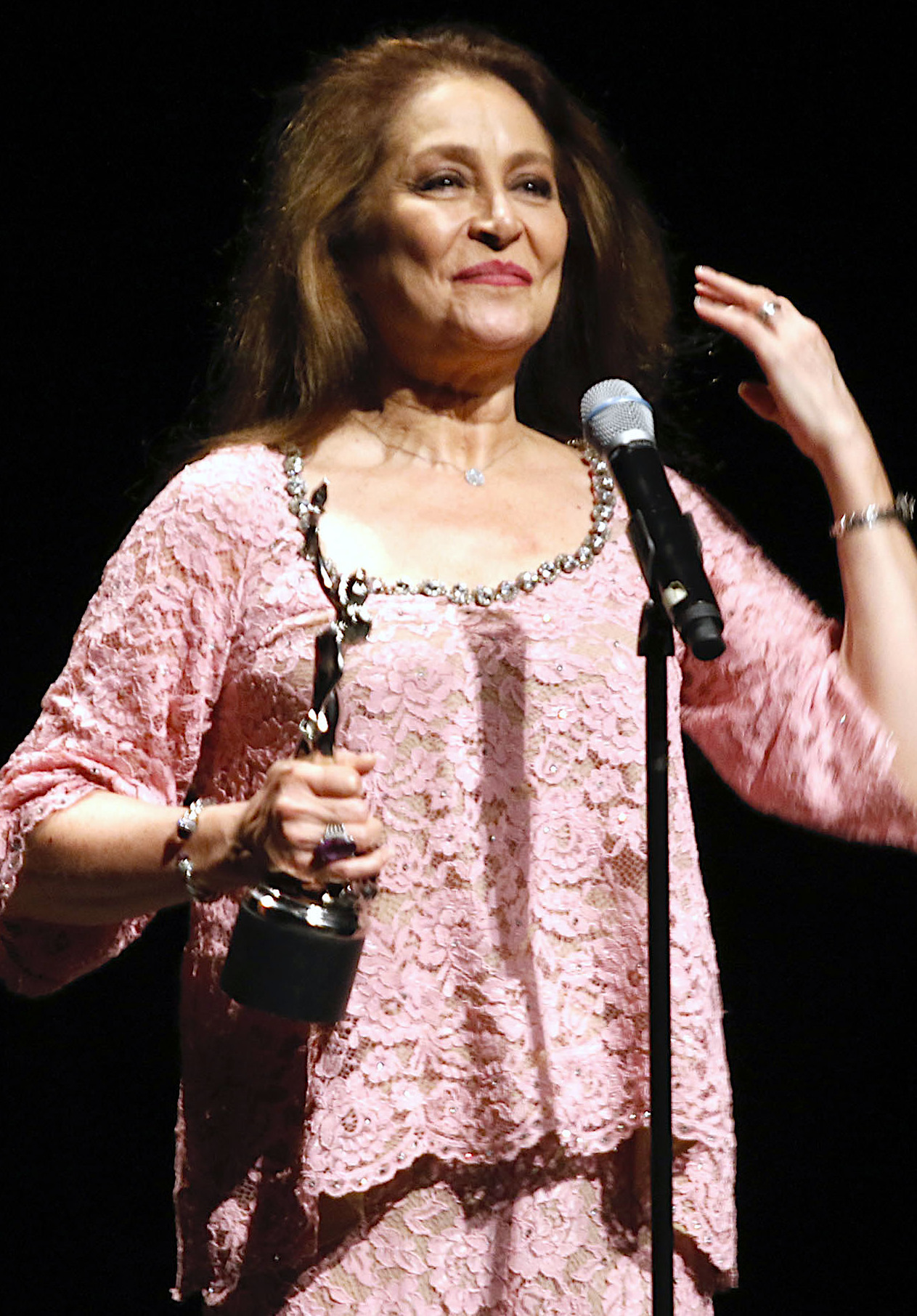
- Romo in 2019
- Born: Teresa Presmanes Corona; 27 August 1959 (age 66); Mexico City, Mexico
- Occupations: Singer; actress; dancer; TV hostess
- Years active: 1972–present
- Awards: Full list
- Musical career
- Genres: Latin pop
- Labels: Disa; EMI; Melody; Mercury; BMG; EMI Televisa; Sony México

Teresa Presmanes Corona (Note: In this Spanish name, the first or paternal surname is Presmanes and the second or maternal family name is Corona.) (born 27 August 1959), known professionally as Daniela Romo, is a Mexican singer, actress and TV hostess. During her career, she has sold 15 million records, making her one of the best-selling Latin music artists.

== Biography ==
Teresa Presmanes Corona was born on 27 August 1959 in Mexico City, Mexico; her parents never married, and Daniela and her sister Patricia were raised by their grandmother. As a child she idolized Rocío Dúrcal, whom she credits for inspiring her to become an actress and a recording artist.

Performing in stage shows such as Gypsy, Romo eventually ventured out into film and television where she would gain recognition making her film debut in La casa del pelícano at the age of 17. Her first starring role on a television soap opera (or telenovela) was in 1978 in El Ardiente Secreto, an adaptation of Jane Eyre.

During her TV era, Romo would go on talk shows or variety shows of the time and sing. During this time, Chucho Ferrer, a popular producer at the time, saw the potential in Romo and offered to produce a record. An ambitious 20-year-old Romo took on this adventure and recorded her debut record También Yo (also released as Te pareces tanto a mí in 1985) released by CBS Records. All of these songs were written by singer-songwriter Lolita de la Colina. The album largely flopped due to the kind of material Romo was singing (mature balladry) and the public was not ready to take on this from such a young singer. Romo went on to do more film and TV, again garnering a hit on television with her soap Déjame vivir in 1982.

After six years away from television, Romo made her return to the small screen in the 1995 hit Si Dios me quita la vida alongside César Évora and Omar Fierro. The telenovela was followed by the variety show Hoy con Daniela in 1996. The show was largely panned by critics and was cancelled after two seasons due to poor ratings. In 2001, however, she hosted Univision's short-lived primetime game show A Millón. That same year, she also won her first roles as a villain in El Manantial, and was then seen in the lighthearted comedy Las vias del amor a year later.

In 2005, Romo released Es la Nostalgia, a collection of acoustic ballads produced by Adrian Posse and that same year, she garnered much praise for her role as the evil Doña Juana in the period soap Alborada. In 2006, Romo produced the musical Cabaret in Mexico and in 2009 was the star in Victor/Victoria on stage. In 2008, Romo starred in the TV series Mujeres asesinas. She starred in the telenovelas Sortilegio (2009) and Triunfo del amor (2010).

== Music career ==
Daniela Romo started out young singing back up to Los Hermanos Zavala before venturing out on stage.

In 1983, she traveled to Spain and met Danilo Vaona through her good friend Miguel Bosé. Danilo was famous at the time as an up-and-coming young Italian producer behind Raffaella Carrà among others. She recorded Daniela Romo under a new label, Hispavox. Her first single "Mentiras" caused a stir in Spain as during this time she was hosting a late night talk show in that country.

Her EMI debut album was a smash producing her No. 1 hit singles "Mentiras", "Celos" (written by José Luis Perales), "Pobre Secretaria" (written by Miguel Bosè), "La Ocasión Para Amarnos" and the ballad "Corazón", which served as the theme to the telenovela Un Sólo Corazón.

Romo's musical career soon devoured all of her time and for the next 4 years, she would dedicate all her attention to it. In 1984 she released her 3rd album Amor Prohibido which garnered her biggest International hit "Yo No Te Pido La Luna". The song was a smash all over Latin America and Spain, where the song was originally released in Italian by Fiordaliso titled "Non voglio mica la luna". She followed this record with Dueña de mi Corazón, which would be her last Danilo Vaona produced record for 11 years. She will work again with him in 1995 producing the album "Un Nuevo Amor".

1986 was a big year for Daniela Romo. This marked her return to television with arguably her best role to date in a telenovela with El Camino Secreto. The theme song to the telenovela was sung by Daniela Romo and was written by Juan Gabriel titled "De Mí Enamórate". This song proved to be Romo's biggest hit in Mexico, spending 21 weeks in the No. 1 position. It also achieved similar status in the US with the new Billboard Hot Latin Tracks, where it spent 14 weeks in the top spot.

Her record Mujer de todos, Mujer de nadie was released this year containing her smash. It was produced by Felisatti/J. R. Florez, the Midas touch hit men of Mexican 1980s pop. This would be her only record produced by this dynamic duo but it produced some of her biggest hits such as the gay anthem "Coco Loco", the ballad "Adelante Corazón", "Veneno Para Dos" and the title track.

Romo's musical career took a turn in 1989 when she released Quiero Amanecer con Alguien produced by Bebu Silvetti. The record was a musical change, adapting to balladry and simpler arrangements, more in the vein of Adult Contemporary pop music. This was a risky moved but it paid off as this record was a huge hit on an international scale. She would keep recording and in 1993, she signed a new record contract with Melody/Fonovisa where she would release 3 albums over the next 4 years. The same year, Romo was nominated for Female Pop Artist of the Year at the Lo Nuestro Awards.

The album Ave Fénix released in 2001 was produced by Loris Ceroni and was largely inspired by Cher's comeback effort Believe, adopting her smooth vocals with dance beats. It was largely ignored because Romo would go on to do telenovelas instead of promoting it.

== Discography ==
=== Studio albums ===
- 2015: La voz del corazón
- 2005: Es la Nostalgia
- 2001: Ave Fénix
- 1999: Me Vuelves Loca
- 1996: Un nuevo amor
- 1992: De Mil Colores
- 1991: Amada más que nunca
- 1989: Quiero Amanecer con Alguien
- 1987: Gitana
- 1986: Mujer de todos, Mujer de nadie
- 1985: Dueña de mi Corazón
- 1984: Amor Prohibido
- 1983: Daniela Romo

=== Live albums/covers and compilations ===
- 2012: Para Soñar
- 2008: Sueños de Cabaret
- 1998: En Vivo Desde el Teatro Alameda
- 1994: La Cita
- 1979: También Yo

=== Thematic albums ===
- 2009: Cuando Hay Amor, No Hay Pecado Sortilegio
- 1999: Juan Pablo Esperanza, Amigo del Alma
- 1999: Los Cuates de Chabelo
- 1996: Me gusta J.S Bach Remix
- 1986: Especiales de Navidad
- 1986: Érase una vez, Cuentos y relatos musicales
- 1986: Coco Loco Dance Mix
- 1983: Canta en Italiano

== Filmography ==
=== Films ===
| Year | Title | Role | Notes |
|---|---|---|---|
| 1978 | La casa del pelícano | Engracia | |
| 1979 | Te quiero | | |
| 1979 | Tres mujeres en la hoguera | Peggy | Uncredited |
| 1979 | Puerto maldito | | |
| 1979 | El año de la peste | | |
| 1980 | Frontera | Rosy | |
| 1981 | Novia, esposa y amante | Laura Mendoza | |
| 1999 | One Man's Hero | Marta | |

=== Television ===
| Year | Title | Role | Notes |
|---|---|---|---|
| 1978 | Ardiente secreto | Mariana | Main Role |
| 1979 | El enemigo | | |
| 1980 | No temas al amor | Alejandra | Main role |
| 1982 | Déjame vivir | Estrella | Main role |
| 1986 | El camino secreto | Gabriela Guillén | |
| 1989 | Balada por un amor | Brianda Portugal | Main role |
| 1995 | Si Dios me quita la vida | María Sánchez Amaro | Main role |
| 2000 | A Millón | Host | |
| 2001 | El manantial | Margarita Insunza de Ramírez | Main role |
| 2002 | Las vías del amor | Leticia López Albavera | Main role |
| 2005 | Alborada | Doña Juana Arellano Viuda de Manrique | Main role |
| 2007 | Amor sin maquillaje | Fernanda Duarte | |
| 2008 | Mujeres asesinas | Cristina Franco | Episode: "Cristina, rebelde" |
| 2009 | Sortilegio | Victoria Viuda de Lombardo | Main role |
| 2010–2011 | Triunfo del amor | Bernarda de Iturbide | Main role |
| 2013 | La Tempestad | Mercedes Artiga | Main role |
| 2016 | El hotel de los secretos | Ángela Gómez | Main role |
| 2017 | En tierras salvajes | Doña Amparo | Main role |
| 2020 | Vencer el miedo | Bárbara Albarrán de Falcon | Guest star |
| 2020–2021 | Vencer el desamor | Bárbara Albarrán de Falcon | Main role |
| 2024 | Amor amargo | Leonor San José | Main role |

== Awards and nominations ==
| Year | Award | Category | Telenovela | Result |
|---|---|---|---|---|
| 2018 | TVyNovelas Awards (36th TVyNovelas Awards) | Best Leading Actress | En tierras salvajes | Nominated |
| 2017 | TVyNovelas Awards (35th TVyNovelas Awards) | Best Leading Actress | El hotel de los secretos | Nominated |
| 2013 | TVyNovelas Awards (32nd TVyNovelas Awards) | Best Leading Actress | La Tempestad | Nominated |
| 2012 | TVyNovelas Awards (30th TVyNovelas Awards) | Best Antagonist Actress | Triunfo del amor | Won |
| 2010 | TVyNovelas Awards (28th TVyNovelas Awards) | Best Leading Actress | Sortilegio | Won |
| 2010 | Bravo Awards | Leading Actress | Sortilegio | Won |
| 2006 | TVyNovelas Awards (24th TVyNovelas Awards) | Best Antagonist Actress | Alborada | Won |
| 2006 | 15th Bravo Awards | Best Antagonist Actress | Alborada | Won |
| 2003 | Premios El Heraldo de México | Best Leading Actress | Las vías del amor | Won |
| 2002 | TVyNovelas Awards (20th TVyNovelas Awards) | Best Leading Actress | El Manantial | Won |
| 2002 | Premios Bravo | Best Antagonist Actress | El Manantial | Won |
| 2002 | Premios El Heraldo de México | Best Television Actress | El Manantial | Won |
| 2003 | Premios INTE | Supporting Actress | El Manantial | Won |
| 1991 | TVyNovelas Awards 9th TVyNovelas Awards | Best Actress | Balada por un amor | Nominated |
| 1987 | TVyNovelas Awards (5th TVyNovelas Awards) | Best Actress | El Camino Secreto | Nominated |

== Collaborations ==
| Year | Album title | Singer's | Song | Review |
|---|---|---|---|---|
| 2009. | "Vivir Así" | Manuel Mijares & Pandora | Para Ti Yo Estoy | Mijares' with Daniela Romo & Pandora, Album about covers of some of the most successful songs in Spanish language. |
| 2009. | "Oro" | Bengala | Fuiste | Bengala' Mexican Group Rock, second record Oro, this song was powerful. |
| 1998. | "Loca" | Simone | Mi amor | Billboard Latin Pop Airplay No. 18; Billboard Hot Latin Songs No. 38 |
| 1996. | "Querido Amigo" | Pedro Infante & Mijares | Enamorada | Mijares' Tribute to Pedro Infante, this trio was very praised by the critics and fans. |
| 1995. | "De Mi Alma Latina" | Plácido Domingo | Se me olvidó otra vez | Compilation of Plácido Domingo with several artists. |
| 1995. | "Por un Mundo Nuevo" | Pacha | Al final | Bolivian group that was produced by Bebu Silvetti. |
| 1994. | "20 Grandes Éxitos" | Rudy Pérez | Hoy y siempre para ti | Tribute to Daniela Romo of Rudy Pérez. |
| 1994. | "La Entrega" | Arturo Vargas | El Uno Para el Otro | The song was presented in Siempre en domingo when Daniela was presenting her then-new album "La Cita". Daniela and Arturo had worked together before, during De Mil Colores season in the Teatro Blanquita. |

== See also ==
- List of best-selling Latin music artists
- Women in Latin music
