= Un Nuevo Amor (Daniela Romo album) =

Studio album by Daniela Romo
- Released: 1996
- Recorded: 1996
- Genre: Pop
- Label: Melody Records
- Producer: Danilo Vaona

Daniela Romo chronology
De Mil Colores (1992)	Un Nuevo Amor (1996)	Me Vuelves Loca (1999)

Un Nuevo Amor (English A new love) is the 9th studio album by Mexican pop singer Daniela Romo. This album was released on 1996 and it was produced by one of the greatest producers of the 80's and 90's "Danilo Vaona". All the songs were written by Daniela, "Danilo Vaona" and "Federico Vaona". The music video for the single "Mátame" was nominated for a Lo Nuestro Award. This album was a return to the pop genre after the commercial and critical failure of her the cover album of rancheras La Cita, this was also her last album to make a significant impact on the Billboard charts and to be recognized in some way by the music industry awards.

== Track listing ==
Tracks:

1. Me gusta J. S. Bach
2. Un nuevo amor
3. Yo soy la dueña
4. Mátame
5. Una aventura
6. Te amaré hasta el final
7. Las mujeres
8. Poesias
9. No soy ella
10. Ni contigo ni sin ti
11. Quiero saber

== Singles ==
- Mátame
- Me gusta J. S. Bach
- Una aventura

=== Singles charts ===
#	Title	United States Hot Lat.	United States Lat. Pop
1.	"Mátame"	17	19
2.	"Me gusta J. S. Bach"	31	—
3.	"Una aventura"	—	—
