= De Mí Enamórate =

Single by Daniela Romo

from the album Mujer de todos, Mujer de nadie
- Released: 1986
- Recorded: 1986
- Genre: Latin pop
- Length: 3:35
- Label: EMI Odeón
- Songwriter: Juan Gabriel
- Producer: Gian Pietro Felisatti

Daniela Romo singles chronology
"Prometes" (1986)	"De Mí Enamórate" (1986)	"Veneno Para Dos" (1987)

"De Mí Enamórate" (English: Fall in Love with Me) is a ballad written by Mexican singer-songwriter Juan Gabriel, and performed by Mexican singer-songwriter and actress Daniela Romo. The song was produced by Gian Pietro Felisatti and co-produced by Miguel Blasco. It was released as the first single from her fourth studio album Mujer de Todos, Mujer de Nadie (1986).

"De Mí Enamórate" was featured as the main theme for Televisa's Mexican telenovela El Camino Secreto (1986-1987), produced by Emilio Larrosa. This single became the first to spend fourteen consecutive weeks at number one in the Billboard Hot Latin Tracks chart. The song went platinum in Mexico, and sold more than two and a half million in Latin America. "De Mí Enamórate" is recognized as Daniela Romo's signature song.

On the 2008 recap for the "100 Greatest Songs of the 80's in Spanish" by VH1 Latin America "De Mí Enamórate" ranked at number 74.

== Chart performance ==
The song debuted on the Billboard Hot Latin Tracks chart at number 39 on October 25, 1986, and climbed to the top ten three weeks later. It reached number one on December 20, replacing "¿Y Quién Puede Ser?" by Mexican singer José José and was replaced fourteen weeks later by Emmanuel's "Es Mi Mujer".

Only four female singers have achieved the same number of weeks (or more) at number one on the Hot Latin Tracks history: Ana Gabriel (14 weeks with "Ay Amor" in 1988), Yuri (16 weeks with "Qué Te Pasa" in 1988) and Shakira (25 weeks with "La Tortura" in 2005). "De Mí Enamórate" ranked 10th at the Hot Latin Songs 25th Anniversary chart.

== Credits and personnel ==
This information adopted from the album Mujer de todos, Mujer de nadie liner notes:

- Gian Pietro Felisatti – producer, arranger
- Jesús Glück – arranger
- Miguel Blasco – executive producer

== Cover versions ==
"De Mí Enamórate" has been recorded by several performers, including Tito Nieves who released it as a single from his album Déjame Vivir (1991), peaking at number 19 in the Hot Latin Tracks. The writer of the song Juan Gabriel, Myriam, Chon Arauza, Patricia Manterola, Sol Morena, Sergio George and Manoella Torres also recorded their own version of the track. On the 2008 Juan Gabriel Tribute album Amo al Divo de Júarez, Delux recorded a rock version of the song.

== See also ==
- List of number-one Billboard Top Latin Songs from the 1980s
