= Bebu Silvetti =

Argentine-Mexican musical artist (1944)

Background information
- Birth name: Juan Fernando Silvetti Adorno
- Born: March 27, 1944; Quilmes, Argentina
- Died: July 5, 2003 (aged 59); Coral Gables, Florida
- Occupation(s): Singer-Songwriter, Music producer

Juan Fernando Silvetti Adorno (March 27, 1944 – July 5, 2003), professionally known as Bebu Silvetti or simply Silvetti, was an Argentine-Mexican pianist, composer, conductor, arranger, and record producer. In the 1970s he moved to Mexico and became a citizen. Popularly known for the 1975 instrumental disco hit, "Lluvia De Primavera" ("Spring Rain)" in English), the album was produced in Spain and for the 1980 modern instrumental mariachi album. Silvetti was also a successful, Grammy-winning producer for a wide variety of Latin and international music performers. He was the father of six children, including the actress Anna Silvetti. Silvetti also worked in the music of successful films and telenovelas in Mexico.

== Biography ==
=== Early life ===
Silvetti was born in the city of Quilmes, Argentina, located in the province of Buenos Aires, approximately 17 kilometers from the capital city of Buenos Aires.

He started his piano education at the age of six. During his teenage years he formed his own jazz quartet and a few other musical groups. At 19, Silvetti left Argentina to go to Spain where he stayed a few years working as a pianist at some of the most popular jazz clubs of the time.

=== Career ===
In the early 1970s he moved to Mexico and started arranging and composing. He recorded his first album, which contained his hit offering, "Spring Rain." The LP was released in the US on Salsoul Records. Other albums followed. Silvetti continued arranging, composing and producing mostly for other artists. After 10 years working in Los Angeles, California, he eventually settled in Miami, Florida, where he produced, arranged, and composed for a wide variety of Latin and international artists.

During his career, Silvetti worked with performers such as Jose Jose, Plácido Domingo, La Mafia, Luis Miguel, Paul Anka, Engelbert Humperdinck, Vikki Carr, Ana Cristina, Roberto Carlos (singer), Rocío Dúrcal, Rocío Jurado, Jerry Rivera, Tamara, Los Kjarkas, Daniela Romo, Armando Manzanero, José Luis Perales, Daniel Barenboim, Juan Gabriel, Maggie Carles, Los Nocheros, Marco Antonio Solís, Ricardo Montaner, Paloma San Basilio, Raúl di Blasio, Vic Damone and Selena.

Silvetti achieved many successes and accolades throughout his long and prolific career. In 2004, Silvetti was honored posthumously as recipient of the 2003 Latin Grammy Award for Producer of the Year for his work on "Hasta Que Vuelvas" by Luis Miguel, "Quién Da un Peso Por Mis Sueños" by Armando Manzanero featuring Alex Lora and the albums Rocío Dúrcal ... En Concierto Inolvidable by Rocío Dúrcal and Suma by Ricardo Montaner. In 2002, he received the Billboard Producer of the Year Award. In 2001, he topped Billboard's year-end "Hot Latin Tracks Producer Chart."

=== Death ===
Bebu Silvetti died at the age of 59 from respiratory failure caused by complications from lung cancer treatment. At the time of his death, he reportedly had composed more than 600 songs, over 200 TV and radio commercials, and a number of film and TV soundtracks.

== Musical legacy ==
His hit track "Spring Rain" was remixed by DJ YOSHITAKA for the Japanese music game beatmania IIDX 13 DistorteD. The song name was changed to "Spring Rain (Lluvia De Primavera)" to signify the remix.

Denki Groove's song "Shangri-La", a remix of which was the ending theme of the 2009 anime series Kūchū Buranko, is based around looped samples of "Spring Rain". Silvetti is credited as a co-writer of the song.

== Select discography ==
- World Without Words (as Silvetti) (1976)
- Super Disco Sound (1976)
- The Sensuous Sound of Silvetti: Spring Rain (as Silvetti) (1977)
- Concert From The Stars (as Silvetti) (1978)
- I Love You (as Silvetti) (1980)
- Silvetti en México (as Bebu Silvetti) (1980)
- Lluvia De Primavera (as Bebu Silvetti) (1994)
- Íntimos (Armando Manzanero and Bebu Silvetti) (1997)
- Boleros Eternos (Carlos Greco and Bebu Silvetti) (2006)
