= List of Spanish Grammy Award winners and nominees =

The following is a list of Grammy Awards winners and nominees from Spain:

Winner(s) or Nominees(s)	Year	Category	Nominated for	Result
Andrés Segovia	1958	Best Instrumental Soloist Performance	Segovia Golden Jubilee	Won
Andrés Segovia	1986	Lifetime Achievement Award	Career	Won
Alejandro Sanz	2004	Best Latin Pop Album	No Es lo Mismo	Won
Alejandro Sanz	2008	Best Latin Pop Album	El Tren de los Momentos	Won
Alejandro Sanz	2011	Best Latin Pop Album	Paraiso Express	Won
Alejandro Sanz	2016	Best Latin Pop Album	Sirope	Nominated
Alejandro Sanz	2020	Best Latin Pop Album	#ElDisco	Won
Alicia de Larrocha	1967	Best Instrumental Soloist(s) Performance	Escenas Romanticas	Nominated
Alicia de Larrocha	1971	Best Instrumental Soloist(s) Performance	Alicia De Larrocha Plays Spanish Piano Music Of The 20th Century	Nominated
Alicia de Larrocha	1974	Best Instrumental Soloist(s) Performance	Albeniz: Iberia	Won
Alicia de Larrocha	1975	Best Instrumental Soloist(s) Performance	Ravel: Concerto For Left Hand And Concerto For Piano In G/Faure: Fantaisie For Piano And Orchestra	Won
Alicia de Larrocha	1975	Best Instrumental Soloist(s) Performance	Falla: "Music Of Falla" (Three Cornered Hat, El Amor Brujo, etc.)	Nominated
Alicia de Larrocha	1977	Best Instrumental Soloist(s) Performance	Concertos From Spain	Nominated
Alicia de Larrocha	1977	Best Instrumental Soloist(s) Performance	Granados: Goyescas	Nominated
Alicia de Larrocha	1982	Best Instrumental Soloist(s) Performance	Schumann: Concerto For Piano In A Minor/ Rachmaninoff: Concerto For Piano No. 2 In C Minor, Op. 18	Nominated
Alicia de Larrocha	1982	Best Instrumental Soloist(s) Performance	Granados: Danzas Espanolas	Nominated
Alicia de Larrocha	1984	Best Instrumental Soloist(s) Performance	Schubert: Piano Sonata In B Flat, Major D. 960	Nominated
Alicia de Larrocha	1988	Best Instrumental Soloist(s) Performance	Albeniz: Iberia, Navarra, Suite Espagnola	Won
Alicia de Larrocha	1990	Best Instrumental Soloist(s) Performance	Mozart: Piano Sonatas (K. 283/331/332/333)	Nominated
Alicia de Larrocha	1991	Best Instrumental Soloist(s) Performance	Granados: Goyescas; Allegro De Concierto; Danza Lenta	Won
Alicia de Larrocha	1992	Best Instrumental Soloist(s) Performance	Mozart: Piano Concertos Nos. 23 And 24	Nominated
Bebe	2010	Best Latin Rock, Urban or Alternative Album	Y.	Nominated
Braulio García	1988	Best Latin Pop Album	En Bancarrota	Nominated
Braulio García	1988	Best Latin Pop Performance	Lo Bello y lo Prohibido	Nominated
Café Quijano	2001	Best Latin Rock or Alternative Album	La Extraordinaria Paradoja Del Sonido Quijano	Nominated
C. Tangana	2022	Best Latin Rock or Alternative Album	El Madrileño	Nominated
Concha Buika	2013	Best Latin Jazz Album	La Noche Más Largawas	Nominated
Concha Buika	2018	Best World Music Album	Para Mi	Nominated
Camilo Sesto	1976	Best Latin Recording	"Quieres Ser Mi Amante"	Nominated
Duncan Dhu	1991	Best Latin Pop Album	Autobiografia	Nominated
Dyango	1989	Best Latin Pop Album	Cae la Noche	Nominated
Dyango	1990	Best Latin Pop Album	Suspiros	Nominated
Enrique Iglesias	1997	Best Latin Pop Album	Enrique Iglesias	Won
Enrique Iglesias	1998	Best Latin Pop Album	Vivir	Nominated
Enrique Iglesias	1999	Best Latin Pop Album	Cosas del Amor	Nominated
Enrique Iglesias	2001	Best Dance Recording	Be With You	Nominated
Gipsy Kings	1990	Best Contemporary Folk Recording	Bamboleo	Nominated
Gipsy Kings	1992	Best World Music Album	Este Mundo	Nominated
Gipsy Kings	1993	Best World Music Album	Gipsy Kings Live	Nominated
Gipsy Kings	1995	Best World Music Album	Love And Liberte	Nominated
Gipsy Kings	1997	Best World Music Album	Tierra Gitana	Nominated
Gipsy Kings	1998	Best World Music Album	Compas	Nominated
Gipsy Kings	2005	Best Contemporary World Music Album	Roots	Nominated
Gipsy Kings	2014	Best World Music Album	Savor Flamenco	Won
Isabel Pantoja	1991	Best Latin Pop Album	Se Me Enamora el Alma	Nominated
Jordi Savall	2011	Best Chamber Music/Small Ensemble Performance	Dinastia Borja	Won
Jordi Savall	2013	Best Opera Recording	Vivaldi: Il Teuzzone	Nominated
Jordi Savall	2018	Best Classical Compendium	Les Routes de l'Esclavage	Nominated
José Luis Perales	1989	Best Latin Pop Album	Sueño de Libertad	Nominated
Julio Iglesias	1981	Best Latin Recording	Hey	Nominated
Julio Iglesias	1983	Best Latin Recording	Momentos	Nominated
Julio Iglesias and Willie Nelson (Note: Willie Nelson is an American musician)	1986	Best Country Performance by a Duo or Group with Vocal	"As Time Goes By"	Nominated
Julio Iglesias	1988	Best Latin Pop Album	Un Hombre Solo	Won
Julio Iglesias	1993	Best Latin Pop Album	Calor	Nominated
Julio Iglesias	1995	Best Latin Pop Album	La Carretera	Nominated
Julio Iglesias	1997	Best Latin Pop Album	Tango	Nominated
La Oreja de Van Gogh	2004	Best Latin Pop Album	Lo Que te Conté Mientras te Hacías la Dormida	Nominated
La Quinta Estacion	2010	Best Latin Pop Album	Sin Frenos	Won
Miguel Bosé	2008	Best Latin Pop Album	Papito	Nominated
Miguel Gallardo	1990	Best Latin Pop Album	America	Nominated
Montserrat Caballé	1969	Best Classical Solo Vocal Album	Rossini: Rarities	Won
Nathy Peluso	2022	Best Latin Rock or Alternative Album	Calambre	Nominated
Nathy Peluso	2025	Best Latin Rock or Alternative Album	Grasa	Pending
Niña Pastori	2015	Best Latin Pop Album	Raiz	Nominated
Pablo Alborán	2016	Best Latin Pop Album	Terral	Nominated
Pablo Alborán	2019	Best Latin Pop Album	Prometo	Nominated
Pablo Alborán	2022	Best Latin Pop Album	Vértigo	Nominated
Paco de Lucía	2005	Best World Music Album	Cositas Buenas	Nominated
Paco de Lucía	2025	Best Historical Album	Pepito y Paquito	Pending
Pau Casals	1989	Lifetime Achievement Award	Career	Won
Pepe de Lucía	2025	Best Historical Album	Pepito y Paquito	Pending
Plácido Domingo	1984	Best Latin Pop Album	Besame Mucho	Nominated
Plácido Domingo	1985	Best Latin Pop Album	Siempre en Mi Corazón — Always in My Heart	Won
Plácido Domingo	1995	Best Latin Pop Album	De Mi Alma Latina	Nominated
Raphael	1989	Best Latin Pop Album	Las Apariencias	Nominated
Raphael	1993	Best Latin Pop Album	Ave Fenix	Nominated
Rocío Dúrcal	1986	Best Mexican/Mexican-American Album	Canta A Juan Gabriel	Nominated
Rocío Dúrcal	1996	Best Latin Pop Album	Hay Amores Y Amores	Nominated
Rocío Dúrcal	2005	Best Mexican/Mexican-American Album	Alma Ranchera	Nominated
Rosalía	2020	Best Latin Rock, Urban or Alternative Album	El Mal Querer	Won
Rosalía	2020	Best New Artist	Herself	Nominated
Rosalía	2023	Best Latin Rock or Alternative Album	Motomami	Won
Rosalía	2023	Best Music Film	Motomami (Rosalía Tiktok Live Performance)	Nominated
Vicente Amigo	2018	Best World Music Album	Memoria de los Sentidos	Nominated
Shaila Durcal	2010	Best Regional Mexican Album	Corazon Rachero	Nominated
The Three Tenors (Note: The Three Tenors consisted of José Carreras, Plácido Domingo and Luciano Pavarotti. Whilst Carreras and Domingo are Spanish nationals, Pavarotti was an Italian national, as such they are not necessarily a Spanish Act.)	1995	Album of the Year	The Three Tenors in Concert 1994	Nominated
The Three Tenors	1995	Best Pop Album	The Three Tenors in Concert 1994	Nominated
The Three Tenors	1991	Best Classical Vocal Performance	Carreras Domingo Pavarotti in Concert	Won
The Three Tenors	1991	Best Classical Album	Carreras Domingo Pavarotti in Concert	Nominated
John McClure (Note: The Grammy was awarded to McClure, an American producer, for the revival of West Side Story, written and conducted by Leonard Bernstein with performances by José Carreras and Kiri Te Kanawa.)	1986	Best Cast Show Album	West Side Story	Won
Yo-Yo Ma & The Silk Road Ensemble (Note: Christina Pato was a member of a large musical collective, who performed on the album.)	2017	Best World Music Album	Sing Me Home	Won
