= El Concierto... En Vivo =

1992 live album by Rocío Dúrcal

Live album by Rocío Dúrcal
- Released: 28 April 1992
- Recorded: 22 November 1991
- Venue: National Auditorium, Mexico City
- Genre: Ranchera; ballad; bolero
- Length: CD, LP: 1:10:00; DVD: 1:50:00
- Label: BMG; Ariola; RCA
- Producer: Enrique Elizondo; Juan Gabriel

Rocío Dúrcal chronology
Si Te Pudiera Mentir (1990)	El Concierto... En Vivo (1992)	Desaires (1993)

Singles from El Concierto... En Vivo
- 1. "Fue Un Placer Conocerte (duet with Juan Gabriel)"; 2. "Como Amigos"; 3. "Tarde (duet with Juan Gabriel)"; 4. "Mía Un Año"

El Concierto... En Vivo (English: The Concert... Live) is Spanish performer Rocío Dúrcal's first live album, released on 28 April 1992 by BMG Ariola and produced by Enrique Elizondo. The album features a selection of her greatest hits and two songs never recorded by Dúrcal, "Mía Un Año" and "Como Amigos," both written and produced by Mexican singer-songwriter Juan Gabriel. The live portion also includes duets with guests Enrique Guzman and Juan Gabriel.

El Concierto... En Vivo was taped on 22 November 1991 in the National Auditorium in Mexico City, and was initially released in three formats: a two-CD set, two-LP set, or cassette. In 2006, two more editions were released: a standard DVD edition and another that also included two CDs.

In the United States this album peaked at #7 on the Billboard Latin Pop Albums chart and its lead single "Fue Un Placer Conocerte" peaked at #10 on the Hot Latin Tracks. This album received the ACE Awards for Best Album of the Year and Best Concert of the Year, and International Artist of the Year from the Association of Latin Entertainment Critics.

== Track listing ==
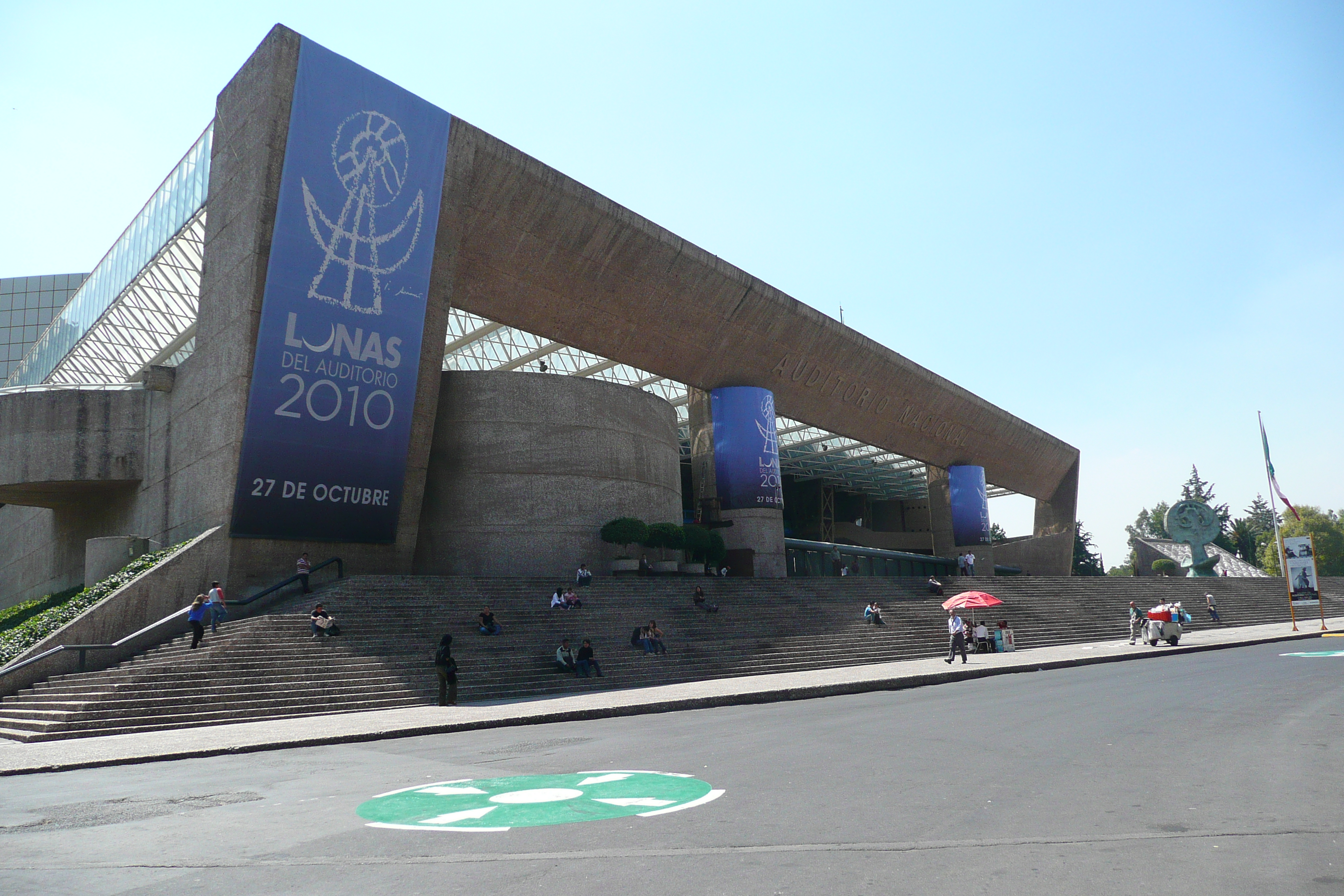
National Auditorium, where the concert was recorded.

- Disc 1 (First edition)

	Title	Writer(s)	Length
1.	"Introducción"	Rubén Zepeda	2:29
2.	"Quédate Conmigo Esta Noche"	Juan Gabriel	3:52
3.	"La Gata Bajo La Lluvia"	Rafael Pérez Botija	3:41
4.	"Jamás Te Dejaré"	Botija	3:34
5.	"Volver A Verte"	Augusto Algueró	3:22
6.	"Mi Amigo"	Algueró	4:21
7.	"Acompáñame" (Duet with Enrique Guzmán)	Algueró, Antonio Guijarro	3:09
8.	"Ya Te Olvidé"	Marco Antonio Solís	2:55
9.	"Te Amo"	Solís	5:09
10.	"Tenías Que Ser Tan Cruel"	Juan Gabriel	3:20
11.	"Se Me Fue Olvidando"	Solís	3:07
12.	"Frente A Frente"	Gabriel	4:28
13.	"No Me Vuelvo A Enamorar" (Duet with Juan Gabriel)	Gabriel	3:22

- Disc 2 (First edition)

	Title	Writer(s)	Length
1.	"Fue Un Placer Conocerte" (Duet with Juan Gabriel)	Juan Gabriel	3:15
2.	"Tarde" (Duet with Juan Gabriel)	Gabriel	3:42
3.	"Tu Abandono"	Gabriel	2:38
4.	"Me Nace Del Corazón"	Gabriel	2:54
5.	"Jamás Me Cansaré De Ti"	Gabriel	3:05
6.	"Me Despertó La Realidad"	Gabriel	4:00
7.	"No Lastimes Más"	Gabriel	4:22
8.	"Diferentes"	Gabriel	3:44
9.	"La Diferencia"	Gabriel	3:32
10.	"Con Todo Y Mi Tristeza"	Gabriel	4:02
11.	"Amor Eterno"	Gabriel	6:17
12.	"Como Tu Mujer"	Marco Antonio Solís	3:36
13.	"La Guirnalda"	Gabriel	3:53
14.	"Final Instrumental (Quédate Conmigo Esta Noche)"	Rubén Zepeda, Gabriel	0:47
15.	"Como Amigos"	Gabriel	4:05
16.	"Mía Un Año"	Gabriel	2:40

- CD (Second edition)

	Title	Writer(s)	Length
1.	"Introducción"	Rubén Zepeda	2:29
2.	"Quédate Conmigo Esta Noche"	Juan Gabriel	3:52
3.	"La Gata Bajo La Lluvia"	Rafael Pérez Botija	3:41
4.	"Jamás Te Dejaré"	Botija	3:34
5.	"Volver A Verte"	Augusto Algueró	3:22
6.	"Acompáñame" (Duet with Enrique Guzmán)	Algueró, Antonio Guijarro	3:09
7.	"Tenías Que Ser Tan Cruel"	Gabriel	3:20
8.	"Frente A Frente"	Gabriel	4:28
9.	"No Me Vuelvo A Enamorar" (Duet with Juan Gabriel)	Gabriel	3:22
10.	"Fue Un Placer Conocerte" (Duet with Juan Gabriel)	Gabriel	3:15
11.	"Tarde" (Duet with Juan Gabriel)	Gabriel	3:42
12.	"Me Nace Del Corazón"	Gabriel	2:54
13.	"Jamás Me Cansaré De Ti"	Gabriel	3:05
14.	"Me Despertó La Realidad"	Gabriel	4:00
15.	"No Lastimes Más"	Gabriel	4:22
16.	"Diferentes"	Gabriel	3:44
17.	"La Diferencia"	Gabriel	3:32
18.	"Amor Eterno"	Gabriel	6:17
19.	"Como Tu Mujer"	Marco Antonio Solís	3:36
20.	"La Guirnalda"	Gabriel	3:53
21.	"Final Instrumental (Quédate Conmigo Esta Noche)"	Rubén Zepeda, Gabriel	0:47

- DVD

	Title	Writer(s)
1.	"Introducción"	Rubén Zepeda
2.	"Quédate Conmigo Esta Noche"	Juan Gabriel
3.	"La Gata Bajo La Lluvia"	Rafael Pérez Botija
4.	"Jamás Te Dejaré"	Botija
5.	"Volver A Verte"	Augusto Algueró
6.	"Mi Amigo"	Algueró, Juan Solano
7.	"Acompáñame" (Duet with Enrique Guzmán)	Algueró, Antonio Guijarro
8.	"Ya Te Olvidé"	Marco Antonio Solís
9.	"Te Amo"	Solís
10.	"Tenías Que Ser Tan Cruel"	Gabriel
11.	"Se Me Fue Olvidando"	Solís
12.	"Frente A Frente"	Gabriel
13.	"No Me Vuelvo A Enamorar" (Duet with Juan Gabriel)	Gabriel
14.	"Fue Un Placer Conocerte" (Duet with Juan Gabriel)	Gabriel
15.	"Tarde" (Duet with Juan Gabriel)	Gabriel
16.	"Tu Abandono"	Gabriel
17.	"Me Nace Del Corazón"	Gabriel
18.	"Jamás Me Cansaré De Ti"	Gabriel
19.	"Me Despertó La Realidad"	Gabriel
20.	"No Lastimes Más"	Gabriel
21.	"Diferentes"	Gabriel
22.	"La Diferencia"	Gabriel
23.	"Con Todo Y Mi Tristeza"	Gabriel
24.	"Amor Eterno"	Gabriel
25.	"Como Tu Mujer"	Solís
26.	"La Guirnalda"	Gabriel
27.	"Final Instrumental (Quédate Conmigo Esta Noche)"'	Zepeda, Gabriel

== Awards ==
- ACE Awards (Association of Latin Entertainment Critics)
- Rocío Dúrcal at Paramount, according to the Association of Latin Entertainment Critics.

Year	Performer	Category	Result
1993	Rocío Dúrcal	International Artist of the Year	Won
Year	Title	Category	Result
1993	El concierto… En vivo	Best Album of the Year	Won
1993	El concierto… En vivo	Best Concert of the Year	Won

== Charts ==
- Billboard Singles

Year	Single	Chart	Peak position
1992	"Fue Un Placer Conocerte"	Hot Latin Tracks	10
1992	"Como Amigos"	Hot Latin Tracks	27

- Billboard Albums

Year	Chart	Peak position
1992	Latin Pop Albums	7

== Certifications ==
Region	Certification
Mexico	Platinum

== Credits and personnel ==
=== Musicians ===
- Rocío Dúrcal – vocals
- Juan Gabriel – vocals
- Enrique Guzmán – vocals
- Mariachi De La Ciudad de Pepe Villela
- Trio Los Soberanos
- Federico Chavez – electric guitar
- Rofrigo Mendoza – bass, guitar
- Alberto Moreno – synthesizer
- David Gomez Oropeza – piano, synthesizer
- Miguel Reyes – drums

=== Production ===
- Directed and produced by – Enrique Elizondo
- Producer of unreleased tracks – Juan Gabriel
- Coordination – Mariana Gómez and Edgar Ramirez
- Musical director – Ruben Zepeda
- Musical direction and coordination – Ruben Cervantes
- Musical adaptation – Jesus Ferrer
- Adaptation – Jesus Rodriguez De Hijar
- Recorded at – National Auditorium of Mexico D.F.
- Words and music for unreleased tracks: Juan Gabriel
- Photography – Carlos Somonte, Mariana Yazbeck
- Label – Ariola Records, CD, LP RCA Records, cassette: 1992
- Label (second edition) – Sony Music 2006
- Distributor – BMG Music
