= Como Tu Mujer =

Single by Rocío Dúrcal

from the album Como Tu Mujer
- Released: 1988
- Recorded: 1988
- Genre: Latin pop · Latin ballad
- Length: 4:25
- Label: BMG Ariola
- Songwriter: Marco Antonio Solís
- Producer: Marco Antonio Solís

Rocío Dúrcal singles chronology
"El Día Que Me Acaricies Lloraré" (1988)	"Como Tu Mujer" (1988)	"El Amor Más Bonito" (1989)

"Como Tu Mujer" (English: As Your Woman) is a song and title track written and produced by Mexican singer-songwriter Marco Antonio Solís and first recorded by Spanish performer Rocío Dúrcal. It was released in 1988 as the first single from studio album Como Tu Mujer (1988), this would be the first album produced by Solís for the singer. This song became a hit all over Latin America and in the United States where it went on to number-one for 10 consecutive weeks. This song is considered by some to be one of her most successful singles. This song earned her many awards such as the Premio Aplauso FM 98, given by "Spanish Broadcasting System", in Los Angeles, California and Premio TV y Novelas for 'Best Female Artist'.

== Charts ==
=== Weekly charts ===
Chart (1989)	Peak position
Colombia (UPI)	2
Dominican Republic (UPI)	6
Mexico (AMPROFON)	2
Panama (UPI)	1
Peru (UPI)	3
US Hot Latin Songs (Billboard)	1
Venezuela (UPI)	5

=== All-time charts ===
Chart (2021)	Position
US Hot Latin Songs (Billboard)	43
