= Como Tu Mujer (album) =

Studio album by Rocío Dúrcal
- Released: 29 October 1988
- Genre: Ballad; pop
- Length: 38:44
- Label: BMG Music Ariola
- Producer: Marco Antonio Solís

Rocío Dúrcal chronology
Canta Once Grandes Éxitos De Juan Gabriel (1987)	Como Tu Mujer (1988)	Si Te Pudiera Mentir (1990)

Singles from Como Tu Mujer
- 1. "Como Tu Mujer"; 2. "El Amor Más Bonito"; 3. "Que Esperabas De Mí"; 4. "Por Qué Tanta Soledad"; 5. "Ya Te Olvidé"; 6. "Extrañándote"

Como Tu Mujer (English: As Your Woman) is the thirteenth studio album released by Spanish performer Rocío Dúrcal. It was released on October 29, 1988 by BMG Ariola. Written and produced by Mexican singer-songwriter Marco Antonio Solís, this would be the first album produced by Solís for the singer.

Its lead single and title track "Como Tu Mujer" became a hit all over Latin America and in the United States where it went on to number-one for 10 consecutive weeks on the Billboard Hot Latin Tracks, considered by many to be one of her most successful singles. This album earned her many awards such as the Premio Aplauso FM 98, given by Spanish Broadcasting System, in Los Angeles, California and Premio TV y Novelas for "Best Female Artist".

== Track listing ==
	Title	Writer(s)	Length
1.	Como Tu Mujer	Marco Antonio Solís	4:25
2.	Por Qué Tanta Soledad	Solís	3:45
3.	Que Pensara Esa Criatura	Solís	3:18
4.	Como Me Duele Irte Perdiendo	Solís	3:51
5.	Ya Te Olvidé	Solís, José Armenta	3:00
6.	Que Esperabas De Mí	Solís	3:49
7.	Extrañándote	Solís	4:14
8.	Yo Creía Que Sí	Solís	3:47
9.	El Amor Más Bonito	Solís	5:05
10.	Mejor Contigo	Solís	3:26

== Personnel ==
Professional ratings
Review scores
Source	Rating
AllMusic	4.5 stars

Musicians

- Rocío Durcal – Vocals
- Marco Antonio Solís – Vocals
- Marco Antonio Solís – Writer, composer

Production

- Producer: Marco Antonio Solís
- Arrangers: Homero Patrón, Marco Antonio Solís
- Engineer: Sergio García
- Assistant engineers: Andy Waterman, Shawn Micheal
- Recorded in studies: Ocean Way Recording Studios, Hollywood, CA.
- Label: Ariola, BMG Music (LP) (CD), RCA Records (Cassette)
- Manufactured and Distributed by: BMG Music y Ariola International.

== Charts ==
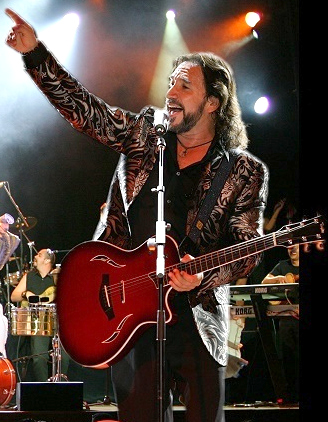
Mexican singer-songwriter Marco Antonio Solís producer albums "Como Tu Mujer" and "Si Te Pudiera Mentir"

Chart positions

- Billboard Singles

Year	Single	Chart	Peak position
1988	"Como Tu Mujer"	Hot Latin Tracks	1
1989	"Que Esperabas De Mí"	Hot Latin Tracks	4
1989	"El Amor Más Bonito"	Hot Latin Tracks	9
1989	"Extrañándote"	Hot Latin Tracks	8
1989	"Por Qué Tanta Soledad"	Hot Latin Tracks	18
1989	"Ya Te Olvidé"	Hot Latin Tracks	12

- Billboard Albums

Year	Chart	Peak position
1988	Latin Pop Albums	2
