= Rocío de la Mancha =

Soundtrack album Rocío from La Mancha by Rocío Dúrcal
- Released: 1963
- Recorded: 1962–1963
- Genre: Pop
- Label: Philips-Phonogram (España)

Rocío Dúrcal chronology
'Canción de Juventud' (1962)	Rocío de la Mancha (1963)	'La Chica Del Trebol' (1964)

Rocío de la Mancha is a 1963 album by the Spanish singer and actress Rocío Dúrcal as the soundtrack album of the 1963 film of the same name.

The film featured songs composed by Augusto Algueró, with lyrics by Antonio Guijarro and Rafael de León. The songs were notable for their stylistic diversity and urban popular music aesthetic. The song "Alegrias de Rocío" weaves in rhythmic and melodic references to flamenco, while the singer herself uses Andalusian vocal technique and accent.

== Songs ==
1. "Alegrias de Rocio"
2. "Canción de San Roque"
3. "Nubes de Colores"
4. "Don Quijote"
5. "Canta Conmigo"
6. "Que Tengas Suerte"
7. "Mi Señora Dulcinea"
8. "Viva Buffalo Bill"
