= La Gata Bajo la Lluvia =

- Mexican release cover

Single by Rocío Dúrcal

from the album La gata / Confidencias
- Language: Spanish
- English title: "The Cat Under the Rain"
- B-side: "Marinero"
- Released: 1981
- Genre: Romantic ballad
- Length: 3:44
- Label: Ariola
- Songwriter: Rafael Pérez Botija
- Producer: Rafael Pérez Botija

Rocío Dúrcal singles chronology
"No sirvo para estar sin ti" (1981)	"La Gata Bajo la Lluvia" (1981)	"La verdad de la verdad" (1981)

"La Gata Bajo la Lluvia" (Castilian for "The Cat Under the Rain") is a song performed by Spanish singer and actress Rocío Dúrcal released as the second single from her twenty-second studio album Confidencias (1981), known as La gata in the European market. A commercial and critical success, "La Gata Bajo la Lluvia" saw success in Spanish-speaking countries becoming a best-selling single in both the Hispanic American and Spanish markets. It is one of Rocío Dúrcal's signature songs.

The song gives the name for the European version of the album, which is named La gata.

The song was commercially successful, especially in Mexico, where it sold a million copies and it is one of the best-selling singles in the country.

== Composition ==
Songwriter Rafael Pérez Botija has said that "La Gata Bajo la Lluvia" was not inspired from a real situation that had happened to him but from a character he creates every time he wants to write a song. During the making of the song he would only imagine what the situation of a heartbreak would feel like.

Dúrcal has stated that even though the song did not come from a real-life experience it still expresses the feelings of a real heartbreak.
