= Siempre =

Siempre may refer to:

- Siempre (Il Divo album), 2006
- Siempre (Rocío Dúrcal album), 1986
- Siempre, an album by Magneto, 1996
- Siempre!, a Mexican political magazine
