= Caricias =

2000 album by Rocío Dúrcal

Studio album by Rocío Dúrcal
- Released: 4 April 2000
- Recorded: 2000
- Studio: AIR Lyndhurst Hall; Southpoint; Hit Factory Criteria
- Genre: Balada; bolero; ranchera
- Length: 36:31
- Language: Spanish
- Label: BMG U.S. Latin; Ariola
- Producer: Bebu Silvetti

Rocío Dúrcal chronology
Para Toda La Vida (1999)	Caricias (2000)	Entre Tangos y Mariachi (2001)

Singles from Caricias
- 1. "Infiel"; 2. "Caricias"; 3. "Porque Te Quiero"

Caricias (English: Caresses) is the nineteenth studio album by Spanish singer Rocío Dúrcal. It was released on 4 April 2000 by BMG U.S. Latin and Ariola, and was produced by Argentinian songwriter Bebu Silvetti. In the United States, Caricias peaked at #2 on the Billboard Latin Pop Albums and number-six on Top Latin Albums. The album was certified 2× Platinum by the Recording Industry Association of America after 120,000 sales and nominated for Pop Album of the Year at the 13th Lo Nuestro Awards in 2001.

The album contains the song "Infiel," the theme song of the Mexican telenovela Mujeres engañadas (1999–2000) starring Laura León and Andrés García.

== Track listing ==
No.	Title	Writer(s)	Length
1.	"Caricias"	Sylvia Riera Ibáñez	3:37
2.	"Quiéreme Un Poquito"	Víctor Yunés Castillo; Adán Pérez	3:18
3.	"Infiel"	Castillo	3:29
4.	"Porque Te Quiero"	Billy Davis	4:02
5.	"Necesito"	Armando Larrinaga	3:42
6.	"Amor Bonito"	Castillo	3:17
7.	"Quién Sabe"	Ibáñez	4:49
8.	"Ni Siquiera Una Mirada"	Jorsaci	3:12
9.	"Esperaba Demasiado"	Ibáñez	3:37
10.	"Que Más Quieres De Mí"	Gil Rivera	3:28
Total length:			36:31

== Personnel ==
Musicians

- Rocío Dúrcal – vocals
- Jonathan Rees – concertino
- London Metropolitan Orchestra – strings
- Andy Brown – strings coordinator
- Manny Lopez – electric guitar, mandolin
- Juan Carlos Giron Flores – vihuela
- Jose Guadalupe Alfaro O. – rhythm guitar
- Juan Carlos Navarro G. – rhythm guitar
- Miguel Dario Gonzales P. – guitar
- Lea Kibler – flutes
- Levin Mora Arriaga – trumpets
- Jesus Sanchez Puebla – bass guitar
- Victor Hugo Dominguez M. – drums

Production

- Bebu Silvetti – producer, arrangements
- Adrian Posse – artist and repertoire direction
- Alfredo Matheus – recording engineer (Miami), mixing engineer
- Steven Orchard – recording engineer (strings/London)
- Carlos Paucar – recording engineer (Miami)
- Roberto Collio – recording engineer (Mexico)
- Chris Carroll – assistant engineer (Miami)
- Fabian Marasciullo – mixing assistant
- Sylvia Silvetti – album coordination
- Mariana Yazbek – photography
- Luz Blanchet – graphic design

== Awards ==
13th Lo Nuestro Awards
Year	Category	Result
2001	Pop Album of the Year	Nominated

== Chart performance ==
Billboard Albums
Year	Chart	Peak Position
2000	Billboard Latin Pop Albums	2
2000	Billboard Top Latin Albums	6
2000	Billboard Heatseekers	50

Billboard Singles
Year	Single	Chart	Peak Position
2000	"Infiel"	Hot Latin Tracks	3
2000	"Infiel"	Latin Pop Airplay	5
2000	"Infiel"	Latin Regional Mexican Airplay	31
2000	"Infiel"	Latin Tropical/Salsa Airplay	27
2000	"Porque Te Quiero"	Hot Latin Tracks	26
2000	"Porque Te Quiero"	Latin Pop Airplay	19

== Certifications ==
Region	Certification	Certified units/sales
Mexico (AMPROFON)	Gold	75,000^{^}
United States (RIAA)	2× Platinum (Latin)	200,000^{^}
^{^} Shipments figures based on certification alone.
