= Confidencias =

Confidencias may refer to:

- Confidencias (Rocío Dúrcal album) (1981)
- Confidencias (Alejandro Fernández album) (2013)
