= Entre Tangos y Mariachi =

Studio album by Rocío Dúrcal
- Released: 15 May 2001
- Studio: The Gallery, Miami, Florida
- Genre: Ranchera; tango
- Length: 39:22
- Label: BMG; Ariola; RCA
- Producer: Bebu Silvetti

Rocío Dúrcal chronology
Caricias (2000)	Entre Tangos y Mariachi (2001)	En Concierto... Inolvidable (2002)

Singles from Entre Tangos y Mariachi
- 1. "Sombras... Nada Más"; 2. "Caminito"; 3. "A Media Luz"; 4. "Nostalgias"

Entre Tangos y Mariachi (English: Between Tangos and Mariachi) is the twenty studio album released by Spanish performer Rocío Dúrcal. It was released on May 15, 2001 by BMG Ariola. It is the second album produced for her by Argentinian songwriter Bebu Silvetti.

This album features ten cover versions of famous tango, mariachi, and samba songs that cross the genres of the mariachi and tango musical styles. To promote this album, the Spanish singer embarked on a tour, performing concert dates in Spain, ending 13 years of absence from her native land.

Four singles were released from Entre Tangos y Mariachi. Its lead single ("Sombras... Nada Más") became a hit all over Latin America and in the United States, where it peaked at number 9 on the Billboard Latin Pop Airplay and at number 16 on the Hot Latin Tracks.

== Track listing ==
No.	Title	Writer(s)	Length
1.	"¡Sombras... Nada Más!"	José María Contursi; Francisco Lomuto	3:41
2.	"El Último Café"	C. Castillo; Hectór Stamponi	4:04
3.	"Soñemos"	Roberto Carlo; Reinaldo Yiso	3:34
4.	"Nostalgias"	Juan Carlos Cobián; Enrique Cadícamo	4:38
5.	"Nada"	Oracio Sanguinetti; José Dames	3:42
6.	"Madreselva"	Francisco Canaro; Luis César Amadori	3:26
7.	"Caminito"	Juan de Dios Filiberto; Coria Peñaloza	3:43
8.	"Vida Mía"	Emilio Fresedo; Osvaldo Fresedo	4:30
9.	"A Media Luz"	Carlos César Lenzi; Edgardo Donato	2:52
10.	"En Esta Tarde Gris"	Contursi; Marianito Mores	4:55

== Personnel ==
Musicians

- Rocío Dúrcal – vocals
- Manny Lopez – electric and acoustic guitars
- Juan Carlos Navarro, Alfredo Solis – mariachi and guitars
- Guadalupe Alfaro – vihuela
- Miami Symphony Orchestra – strings
- Jeanne Tarrant – Flute
- Robert Weiner – oboe
- Alfredo Oliva – accordion
- Levi Mora-Arriaga – trumpet
- Bebu Silvetti – piano, synthesizer
- Julio Hernandez – bass
- Orlando Hernandez – drums

Production

- Direction and production: Bebu Silvetti
- Executive Director: Adrian Posse and Antonio Morales
- Address A & R (artists and repertoire): Alejandro Barrales
- Engineer: Alfredo Matheus
- Digital management engineer Boris Milan
- Coordination: Sylvia Silvetti
- Arranger: Bebu Silvetti
- Recorded at: The Gallery, Miami, Florida, United States
- Photographer: Adolfo Pérez Butron
- Label: BMG Music and Ariola Records (CD), RCA Records (Cassette)
- Manufactured and Distributed by BMG Music, Ariola International and RCA International

== Charts ==
Entre Tangos y Mariachi
Year	Chart	Peak
2001	Billboard Top Latin Albums	12
2001	Billboard Latin Pop Albums	7

"¡Sombras... Nada Más!
Year	Chart	Peak
2001	Billboard Hot Latin Tracks	16
2001	Billboard Latin Pop Airplay	9
2001	Billboard Latin Tropical/Salsa Airplay	30

== Certifications ==
Region	Certification	Certified units/sales
Spain (Promusicae)	Gold	50,000^{^}
^{^} Shipments figures based on certification alone.
