= Desaires =

Studio album by Rocío Dúrcal
- Released: 16 November 1993
- Studio: Record Milagro, Los Angeles, California; Ocean Way Recording Studios, Hollywood, California
- Genre: Ranchera
- Length: 29:50
- Label: BMG Music; Ariola Records
- Producer: Joan Sebastian

Rocío Dúrcal chronology
| El Concierto... En Vivo (1992) | Desaires (1993) | Hay Amores Y Amores (1995) |

Singles from Desaires
- 1. "Desaires"; 2. "Mi Credo"; 3. "Órale"; 4. "Que Ya No Estas"

Desaires (English: Slights) is the fifteenth studio album by Spanish performer Rocío Dúrcal. It was released on November 16, 1993 under the label of BMG Ariola. Written and produced by Mexican songwriter Joan Sebastian. This album peaked at number-sixteen on the U.S. Billboard Latin Pop Albums.

Four singles were released from "Desaires". The album's lead single "Desaires" peaked at number 4 on the U.S. Billboard Hot Latin Tracks. The second single "Mi Credo" peaked at number 16 on the chart Hot Latin Tracks.

== Track listing ==
All tracks are written by Joan Sebastian.

| No. | Title | Length |
|---|---|---|
| 1. | "Desaires" | 2:41 |
| 2. | "Órale" | 2:23 |
| 3. | "Mi Credo" | 3:10 |
| 4. | "Sin Una Lágrima" | 2:53 |
| 5. | "Palomo Gris" | 3:53 |
| 6. | "La Huerta" | 3:00 |
| 7. | "Domingo De Feria" | 2:54 |
| 8. | "Más Te Vale" | 2:14 |
| 9. | "En Un Hilo" | 3:10 |
| 10. | "Que Ya No Estas" | 3:32 |
| Total length: | | 29:50 |

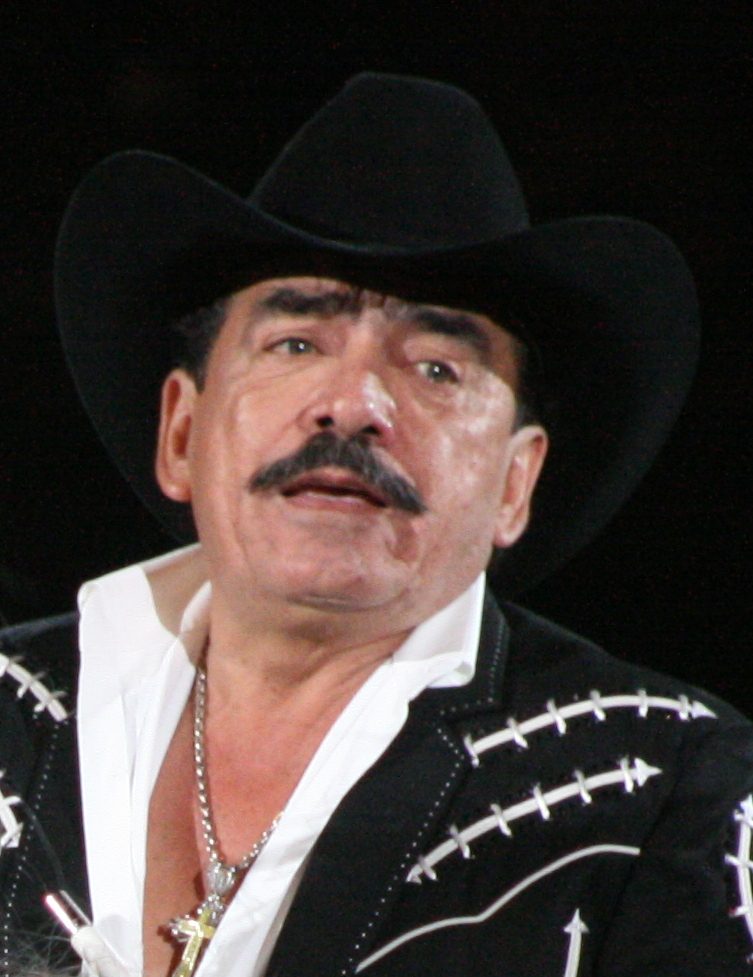
Joan Sebastian, producer of the album

== Charts ==
- Billboard Singles

| Year | Single | Chart | Peak position |
|---|---|---|---|
| 1993 | "Desaires" | Hot Latin Tracks | 4 |
| 1994 | "Mi Credo" | Hot Latin Tracks | 14 |

- Billboard Albums

| Chart (1994) | Peak position |
|---|---|
| U.S. Billboard Top Latin Albums | 43 |

== Certifications ==
- Certifications

| País | Certificación |
|---|---|
| Mexico | Platinum |
| Venezuela | Gold |

== Personnel ==
=== Musicians ===
- Rocío Dúrcal – vocals
- Joan Sebastian – lyrics, music
- Rigoberto Alfaro – guitar, background vocals
- Jose Guadalupe Alfaro – vihuela
- Bernardino De Santiago – guitar
- Cesar Gomez – flute
- Javier Carrillo – harmonica, strings
- Francisco Javier Serrano – trumpet, cornet
- Antonio Morales, Jose Manuel Figueroa – background vocals
- Mariachi Aguilas De America De Javier Carrillo – strings, choir

=== Production ===
- Direction and producer – Joan Sebastian
- Engineer – Rob Russell
- Assistant engineer – Brian Young
- Makeup – Alan Simancas
