= Si Te Pudiera Mentir =

Studio album by Rocío Dúrcal
- Released: 23 June 1990
- Recorded: 1990
- Studio: Ocean Way Recording Studios, Hollywood
- Genre: Balada, Bolero, Pop
- Length: 41:37
- Label: BMG Music, Ariola
- Producer: Marco Antonio Solís

Rocío Dúrcal chronology
Como Tu Mujer (1988)	Si Te Pudiera Mentir (1990)	El Concierto... En Vivo (1992)

Singles from Si Te Pudiera Mentir
- 1. "Te Amo"; 2. "La Balanza"; 3. "Falso"; 4. "A Qué Me Quedo Contigo"; 5. "Me Duele Que Así Te Vayas"; 6. "Si Te Pudiera Mentir"; 7. "Se Me Fue Olvidando"

Si Te Pudiera Mentir (English: If I Could Lie To You) is the fourteenth studio album by Spanish performer Rocío Dúrcal. It was released on June 23, 1990 by BMG Ariola. It is the second and last album Mexican singer-songwriter Marco Antonio Solís produced for Dúrcal.

Seven singles were released from Si Te Pudiera Mentir. Its lead single "Te Amo" peaked at number 5 on the US Billboard Hot Latin Tracks component chart, and the follow-up singles "La Balanza",'"Falso" and "A Qué Me Quedo Contigo" enjoyed moderate success on the Hot Latin Tracks, peaking within the top ten of the chart.

== Track listing ==
All tracks are written by Marco Antonio Solís.

No.	Title	Length
1.	"Te Amo"	5:04
2.	"Por Tu Maldad"	4:13
3.	"Falso"	3:42
4.	"La Balanza"	4:15
5.	"Se Me Fue Olvidando"	3:15
6.	"Comprenderás A Una Mujer"	3:45
7.	"Si Te Pudiera Mentir"	4:43
8.	"A Qué Me Quedo Contigo"	4:05
9.	"Llorando Sabrás"	4:36
10.	"Me Duele Que Así Te Vayas"	3:59
Total length:		41:37

== Awards ==
Year	Award	Category	Result
1991	Premio "Heraldo"	Best Performer of the Year	Won
1991	Premio "Heraldo"	Best International Artist of the Year	Won

== Charts ==
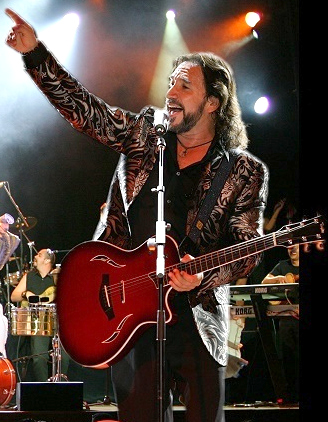
Mexican singer-songwriter Marco Antonio Solís, producer of Dúrcal's albums Como Tu Mujer and Si Te Pudiera Mentir

Billboard Singles
Year	Single	Chart	Peak position
1990	"Te Amo"	Billboard Hot Latin Tracks	5
1990	"La Balanza"	Billboard Hot Latin Tracks	10
1991	"Falso"	Billboard Hot Latin Tracks	33
1991	"A Qué Me Quedo Contigo"	Billboard Hot Latin Tracks	7

Billboard Albums
Chart (1990)	Peak position
Billboard Latin Pop Albums	12

== Personnel ==
=== Musicians ===
- Rocío Dúrcal – vocals
- Marco Antonio Solís – writer, composer
- Pat Coil – keyboards
- Luis Conde – percussion
- Mike Miller – guitar
- Henry Newmark – drums
- Sid Page – strings
- Wade Short – acoustic bass, electric bass

=== Production ===
- Producer – Marco Antonio Solís
- Arrangements and direction – Homero Patron
- Recording engineers – Andy Waterman, David Appelt
- Assistant engineer – David Grant
- Mastering – Chris Bellman
- Makeup – Judy D'Ifray
- Dressing – Jeff Gardner
- Photography – Nicola Dill
- Cover design – Stephen Lumel
- Recorded at – Ocean Way Recording Studios, Hollywood
- Label – BMG Music, Ariola (CD, LP); RCA Records (Cassette)
- Manufactured and distributed by – BMG Music and Ariola International
