= Madrid Carnival =

1941 film

- Directed by: Edgar Neville
- Written by: Rafael de León; Edgar Neville
- Produced by: Saturnino Ulargui
- Cinematography: Theodore J. Pahle
- Edited by: Petra de Nieva
- Music by: Manuel L. Quiroga
- Production company: Ufisa
- Release date: 10 November 1941
- Country: Spain
- Language: Spanish

Madrid Carnival (Spanish: Verbena) is a 1941 Spanish semi-documentary drama film directed by Edgar Neville.

== Cast ==
- Maruja Tomás
- Amalia de Isaura
- Miguel Pozanco
- Manuel Dicenta
- José Martín
- Manolo Morán
- Ana María Quijada
- Miguel Utrillo
- Juan Monfort
- José María Lado

== Bibliography ==
- Bentley, Bernard. A Companion to Spanish Cinema. Boydell & Brewer 2008.
