= Love in Flight =

1967 film

- Spanish: Amor en el aire
- Directed by: Luis César Amadori
- Written by: Luis César Amadori; Jesús María de Arozamena
- Starring: Rocío Dúrcal; Palito Ortega; Amalia de Isaura
- Edited by: Antonio Ramírez de Loaysa
- Production company: Argentina Sono Film
- Release date: 1967
- Running time: 100 minutes
- Countries: Spain; Argentina
- Language: Spanish

Love in Flight (Spanish: Amor en el aire) is a 1967 romantic comedy film, a co-production between Spain and Argentina directed and written by Luis César Amadori with Jesús María de Arozamena.

== Release ==
The film premiered in Spain on 25 December 1967 and in Argentina on 29 August 1968.

== Cast ==
- Rocío Dúrcal
- Palito Ortega
- Amalia de Isaura
- Rafael Alcántara
- Manuel Alexandre
- Rafaela Aparicio
- José María Labernié
- José Luis López Vázquez
- Erasmo Pascual
- Fernando Rey
- Elio Roca
