= La Guirnalda =

Single by Rocío Dúrcal

from the album Siempre
- Released: 1986
- Genre: Latin
- Length: 4:06:00
- Label: RCA
- Songwriter: Juan Gabriel
- Producer: Juan Gabriel

Rocío Dúrcal singles chronology
"La Guirnalda" (1986)	"Quedate Conmigo Esta Noche" (1986)

"La Guirnalda" ("The Garland") is a song written and produced by Mexican singer-songwriter Juan Gabriel and first recorded by Spanish performer Rocío Dúrcal. It was released in 1986 as the first single from Siempre, Dúrcal's tenth album produced by Juan Gabriel. The song became very successful and is often referred as one of her signature songs. According to the Billboard magazine electronic database, "La Guirnalda" holds the distinction for being the first number-one single on the Billboard Hot Latin Tracks chart on September 6, 1986, being replaced at the top by Juan Gabriel with "Yo No Sé Qué Me Pasó"; however, in the printed version of the same chart, titled "Hot Latin 50" for the week of October 4, 1986, the songs appears at number three, following "Yo No Sé Qué Me Pasó" and Emmanuel's version of "Toda la Vida". In 1989, Mexican singer Daniela Romo recorded her own version of the song and included it on her album Quiero Amanecer con Alguien. The music video for the song was shot at Puerto Vallarta Beach, Mexico.

== Chart performance ==
Chart (1986)	Peak position
U.S. Billboard Hot Latin Tracks	1

== See also ==
- List of number-one Billboard Top Latin Songs from the 1980s
