= En Concierto... Inolvidable =

Live album by Rocío Dúrcal

Live album by Rocío Dúrcal
- Released: 22 October 2002
- Recorded: 19 September 2002
- Venue: National Auditorium, Mexico City, Mexico
- Studio: Criteria/The Hit Factory, Miami, Florida (strings); Neo Audio Studios, Mexico City, Mexico (mariachi, concert, vocals); Castle Recording Studios, Miami, Florida (mixing)
- Genre: Ranchera; bolero
- Length: CD: 58:41; DVD: 01:01:18
- Label: BMG; Ariola
- Producer: Bebu Silvetti

Rocío Dúrcal chronology
Entre Tangos y Mariachi (2001)	En Concierto... Inolvidable (2002)	Caramelito (2003)

Singles from En Concierto... Inolvidable
- 1. "Hasta Que Vuelvas"; 2. "Si Nos Dejan"; 3. "De Qué Manera Te Olvido"

Alternative cover

En Concierto... Inolvidable (In Concert... Unforgettable) is the second live album by Spanish singer Rocío Dúrcal, released on 22 October 2002 by BMG Music and Ariola Records. It is her third produced by Argentinean songwriter Bebu Silvetti. For this album, Dúrcal received a Latin Grammy nomination for Best Ranchero Album in 2003.

The concert was recorded on 19 September 2002 at the National Auditorium in Mexico City. It includes two songs never recorded before by the artist: "Eres Único", written by Armando Manzanero, and "Hasta Que Vuelvas", written by Kike Santander, which was released as single. The concert was also released on DVD.

== Track listing ==
All music is composed by Bebu Silvetti, some songs based on others originals.

CD
No.	Title	Writer(s)	Length
1.	"Obertura: Costumbres/La Gata Bajo La Lluvia/Cómo Han Pasado Los Ańos/La Guirnalda/Sola/Amor Eterno"	Juan Gabriel/Rafael Pérez Botija/Roberto Livi, Rafael Ferro/Gabriel/Antonio Morales/Gabriel	2:04
2.	"Cómo Han Pasado Los Ańos"	Livi; Ferro	3:30
3.	"Jamás Te Prometí Un Jardín de Rosas"	Gabriel	4:01
4.	"Luz De Luna"	Álvaro Carrillo	3:37
5.	"Si Nos Dejan"	José Alfredo Jiménez	3:09
6.	"De Qué Manera Te Olvido"	Federico Méndez Tejeda	2:52
7.	"Me Gustas Mucho"	Gabriel	3:32
8.	"Desaires"	Joan Sebastian	2:51
9.	"Infiel"	Víctor Yunés Castillo	3:55
10.	"Como Tu Mujer"	Marco Antonio Solis	4:07
11.	"Porque Te Quiero"	Jorsaci	4:35
12.	"Sombras... Nada Más"	José María Contursi	3:50
13.	"Costumbres"	Gabriel	5:06
14.	"Amor Eterno"	Gabriel	6:47
15.	"Eres Único" (unpublished)	Armando Manzanero	3:37
16.	"Hasta Que Vuelvas" (unpublished)	Kike Santander	3:58
Total length:			61:31

DVD
No.	Title	Writer(s)	Length
1.	"Obertura: Costumbres/La Gata Bajo La Lluvia/Cómo Han Pasado Los Ańos/La Guirnalda/Sola/Amor Eterno"	Juan Gabriel/Rafael Pérez Botija/Roberto Livi, Rafael Ferro/Juan Gabriel/Antonio Morales/Juan Gabriel
2.	"Quédate Conmigo Esta Noche"	Gabriel
3.	"La Gata Bajo La Lluvia"	Botija
4.	"Vestida De Blanco"	Livi
5.	"Cómo Han Pasado Los Ańos"	Livi; Ferro
6.	"Fue Un Placer Concerte"	Gabriel
7.	"Fue Tan Poco Tu Carińo"	Gabriel
8.	"Te Sigo Amando"	Gabriel
9.	"Me Nace Del Corazón"	Gabriel
10.	"Luz De Luna"	Álvaro Carrillo
11.	"Si Nos Dejan"	José Alfredo-Jiménez
12.	"De Qué Manera Te Olvida"	Federico Méndez Tejeda
13.	"Me Gustas Mucho"	Gabriel
14.	"Desaires"	Joan Sebastian
15.	"Infiel"	Víctor Yunés Castillo
16.	"La Guirnalda"	Gabriel
17.	"Como Tu Mujer"	Marco Antonio Solís
18.	"Porque Te Quiero"	Jorsaci
19.	"Sombras... Nada Más"	José Maria Contursi
20.	"A Media Luz"	Emilio Fresedo; Osvaldo Fresedo
21.	"Costumbres"	Gabriel
22.	"Caminito"	Gabino Coria Peñaloza
23.	"Amor Eterno"	Gabriel
Total length:			01:01:18

== Accolades ==
- Latin Grammy Award

Year	Title	Category	Result
2003	En Concierto... Inolvidable	Best Ranchero Album	Nominated

== Charts ==
- Billboard Albums

Year	Chart	Peak position
2002	Top Latin Albums	48

== Certifications ==
Region	Certification	Sales/shipments
Mexico (AMPROFON)	Platinum	60,000
Spain (PROMUSICAE)	Gold	10,000

== Credits and personnel ==
Musicians

- Rocío Dúrcal – vocals
- Susana de la Heras – chorus
- Ariadne Bojalil – chorus
- Alejandra García – chorus
- Alfredo Oliva – concertmaster
- Miami Symphonic Strings – strings
- Bebu Silvetti – piano
- Manny López – guitars
- Julio Hernández – electric bass
- Lee Levine – drums
- Richard Bravo – percussion
- José Guadalupe Alfaro – vihuela
- Juan Carlos Girón – guitar
- Erick Mora – guitar
- Bernardino de Santiago – guitarrón
- Levi Mora-Arriaga – trumpet
- Jim Hacker – trumpet
- Jason Carder – trumpet
- Trevor Nueman – trumpet
- Dwayne Dixon – french horn
- John David Smith – french horn
- Dana Teboe – trombone
- John Hutchinson – trombone
- John Kricker – trombone
- Jaren Dixon – flute
- Deborah Fleischer – harp
- Mark Schubert – marimba, timpani
- Robert Weiner – oboe

Production

- Bebu Silvetti – producer, arrangements, direction
- Adrián Posse – executive director
- Antonio Morales – artistic direction
- Alejandro Barrales – artist and repertoire direction
- Arturo de la Heras – production coordination
- Gabriela Pagaza – production coordination
- Omar Guzmán – musical direction
- Boris Milan – recording engineer, digital editing and mixing
- Kent Hert – strings engineer
- Jaen Smit – engineer (Mexico)
- Victor Fernández – engineer (Mexico)
- Juan Carlos Pastrana – engineer (Mexico)
- Norberto Islas – engineer (Mexico)
- Javier Villalvaso – assistant
- Oscar Flores – assistant
- Alejandro Sanchez – assistant
- Sylvia Silvetti – coordination
- Alfredo Oliva – coordination
- Mike Fuller – mastering
- Adolfo Pérez Butrón – photography
- Carlos Somonte – photography
- Juan Carlos Equihua – photography
- Martín Fernández – photography
- Javier de la Rosa – makeup
- Manuel Luca – hairstyles
- Marcos (Joss) – concert hairstyles
- Alberto Carballo – graphic design
