= Para Toda La Vida (Rocío Dúrcal album) =

Studio album by Rocío Dúrcal
- Released: February 23, 1999
- Recorded: Martin Sound, Los Angeles (1998); Criterios Recording Studios, Miami (1998)
- Genre: Bolero, pop
- Length: 42:29
- Label: Sony BMG
- Producer: Roberto Livi

Rocío Dúrcal chronology
Juntos Otra Vez (1997)	Para Toda La Vida (1999)	Caricias (2000)

Singles from Para Toda La Vida
- 1. "Para Toda La Vida"; 2. "Hoy Lo Vi Pasar"; 3. "Poquito Olvido, Mucho Corazón"; 4. "El Juzgado 23"; 5. "Ten Cuidado"

Para Toda La Vida (For All Life) is the eighteenth studio album by Spanish performer Rocío Dúrcal. It was released on February 23, 1999, by BMG Ariola. It is her second album written and produced by Argentinian songwriter Roberto Livi.

During the year of the album's release, the album's lead single "Para Toda La Vida" peaked at number 10 on the Billboard Latin Pop Airplay in Latin America and the United States. Dúrcal also received the TV y Novelas award (special recognition for being a worldwide ambassador of ranchera music) and the Billboard Hall of Fame award.

== Track listing ==
	Title	Writer(s)	Length
1.	"Para Toda La Vida"	Roberto Livi	3:32
2.	"Parece Mentira"	Livi, Rafael Ferro	4:53
3.	"Pagaré Condena"	Livi, Jorge Madeira	3:53
4.	"Hoy Lo Vi Pasar"	Livi, Juan Marcelo	3:22
5.	"No Pensar En Ti"	Livi, Ferro	4:50
6.	"El Juzgado 23"	Livi, Miguel Ángel Robles	4:10
7.	"Siempre Por Ti"	Livi, Adrián Posse	3:13
8.	"Poquito Olvido, Mucho Corazón"	Livi, Alejandro Vezzani	3:32
9.	"El Amor Que Tenía"	Livi, Ferro	4:23
10.	"La Farsante"	Livi, Posse	3:43
11.	"Ten Cuidado"	Livi, Vezzani	3:09

== Awards ==
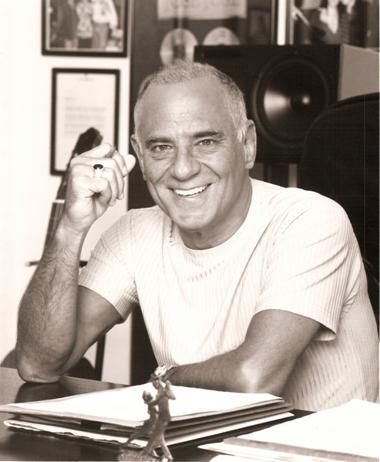
Roberto Livi, producer

- TV y Novelas – Special recognition for being the ambassador of the Song Ranchera Worldwide.
- Hall of Fame (Billboard) – Special recognition for his musical career.

== Charts ==
- Billboard Singles

Year	Single	Chart	Peak position
1999	"Para Toda La Vida'"	Latin Pop Airplay	10

- Billboard Albums

Chart (1999)	Peak position
Top Latin Albums	32

== Certifications ==
- Certifications

Country	Certification
United States	Gold
Mexico	Platinum

== Credits and personnel ==
Musicians

- Rocío Dúrcal – (Vocals)
- Kathleen Melgarejo – (Chorus).
- George Noriega – (Chorus).
- Wendy Peterson – (Chorus).
- Jeannie Cross – (Chorus).
- Grant Geissman – (Guitar).
- Pedro Iniguez – (Accordion).
- Ramon Flores – (Trumpet).
- Gary Grant, Jerry Hey, Larry Williams, Frank William "Bill" Reichenbach Jr. – (Brass).
- Julian "Pelusa" Navarro –

Arranger, Musical Director, 
(Piano Synths, programming).

- Lee Levin – (Drums).
- Richard Bravo – (Percussion).
- Los Angeles Strings – (Set).

Production

- Direction and Production: Roberto Livi.
- Arranger: Julian Navarro.
- Engineers: Mike Couzzi, Ted Stein, Shawn Michael, JC Ulloa.
- Assistant Engineer: Chris Carroll and Juan Rosario.
- Production management: Juan Mardi.
- Coordinator of art: Antonio Morales.
- Photographer: Cesar Vera.
- Contributing: Gary Grant, Grant Geissman, Jerry Hey, Larry Williams, Julian Navarro, Lee Levin, Pedro Iñiguez, Rafael Basurto, Richard Bravo, Ramon Flores, Frank William "Bill" Reichenbach Jr.
- Audio Mixer: Mike Couzzi.
- Recorded In Studies: Criteria Recording Studios, Miami, Martin Sound, Los Angeles.
- Label: BMG Music, Ariola International, Sony Music (CD) and RCA (Cassette).
- Manufactured And Distributed By: BMG Ariola and RCA International.
