= Caramelito =

Studio album by Rocío Dúrcal
- Released: 6 May 2003
- Recorded: 2002, 2003; Mas Music, D B Music Productions Studios, Estudio G Miami, Florida, Mas Studios, Santander Studios, The Gallery Recording Studios, Ultrasound Recording Studios
- Genre: Pop, Bolero
- Length: 37:02
- Label: BMG Music, Ariola Records RCA
- Producer: Kike Santander

Rocío Dúrcal chronology
| En Concierto... Inolvidable (2002) | Caramelito (2003) | Alma Ranchera (2004) |

Singles from Caramelito
- 1. "Caramelito"; 2. "Hasta Que Vuelvas"; 3. "Como Puedo"; 4. "Por Amarme Tanto"

Caramelito (Candy) is the twenty-first studio album by Spanish performer Rocío Dúrcal. It was released on May 6, 2003 by BMG Ariola. Produced by Colombian songwriter Kike Santander. The album was nominated for a Latin Grammy Award for Best Female Pop Vocal Album at the 2004.

This album contains a selection of tracks that cross the Rhythmic pop and the romantic ballad, with songs of big composers as: Raúl Ornelas, José Alfredo Jiménez, Luis Carlos Monroy, Claudia Brant, kiko Cibrian and Kike Santander, Its lead single "Caramelito" enjoyed moderate success on Spain and Latinamerica.

== Track listing ==
| | Title | Writer(s) | Length |
|---|---|---|---|
| 1. | "Es Mi Castigo" | Kike Santander | 4:36 |
| 2. | "Después De Tu Amor" | Claudia Brant, Kiko Cibrian | 4:03 |
| 3. | "Él" | Santander | 3:49 |
| 4. | "Estrellita De La Mañana" | Raúl Ornelas | 3:31 |
| 5. | "Como Puedo" | Santander | 3:43 |
| 6. | "Por Amarme Tanto" | Raúl Ornelas, Luis Carlos Monroy | 4:00 |
| 7. | "Caramelito" | Santander | 3:19 |
| 8. | "Un Pedazo De Luna" | José Alfredo Jiménez | 3:41 |
| 9. | "Yo Por Ti" | Santander | 3:53 |
| 10. | "Hasta Que Vuelvas" (Remake) | Santander | 3:52 |

== Awards ==
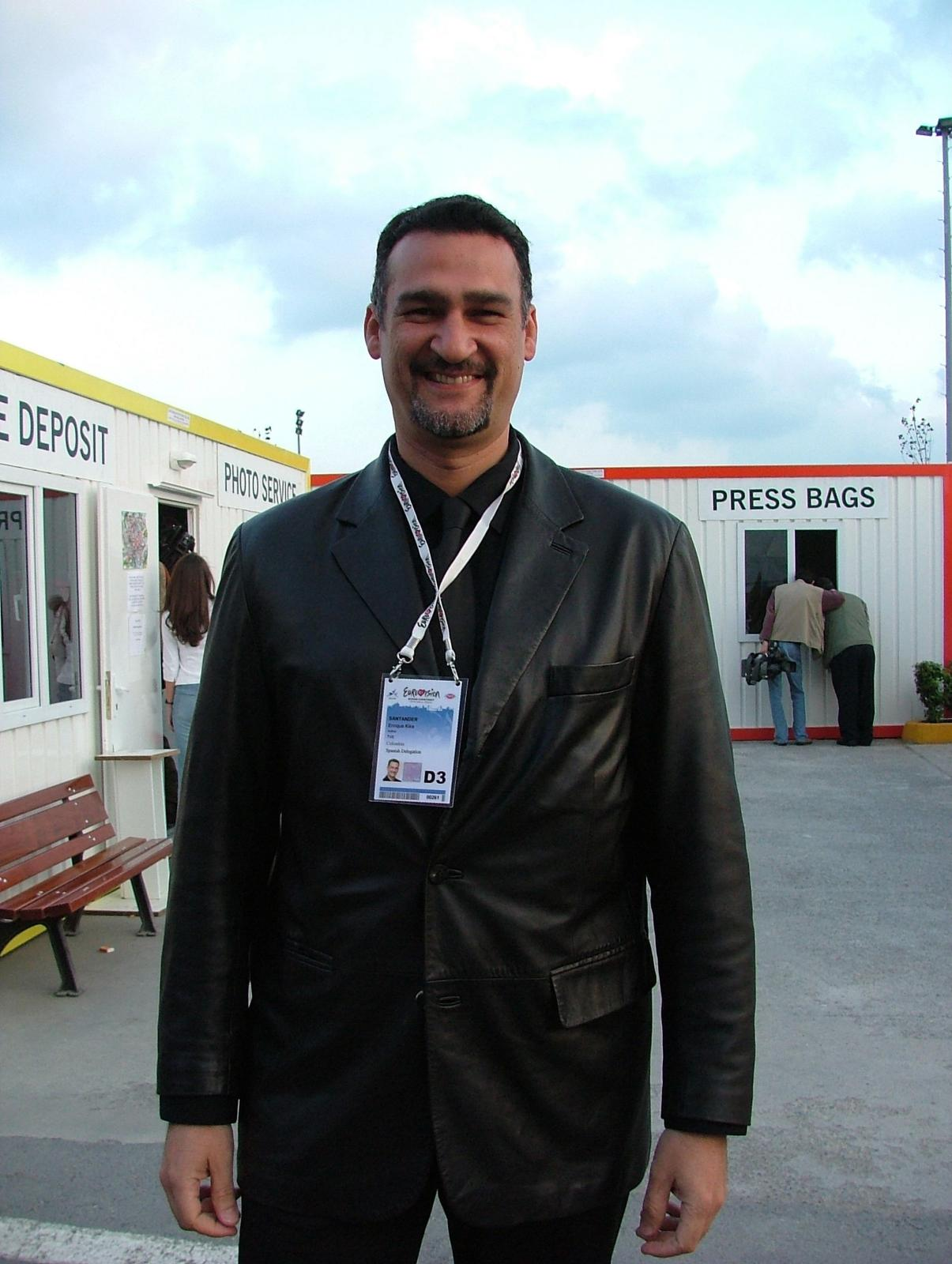
Colombian songwriter Kike Santander Producer albums "Caramelito"

- Latin Grammy Award

| Year | Title | Category | Result |
|---|---|---|---|
| 2004 | Caramelito | Best Female Pop Vocal Album | Nominated |

== Credits and personnel ==
Musicians

- Rocío Dúrcal – (Vocals)
- Kike Santander – (Words and Music).
- Milton Salcedo – (Piano, Keyboards, Programming)
- Bernardo Ossa – (Keyboards, Programming)
- Salvador Cuevas – (Baby bass, Bass 5th)
- Richard Bravo – (Acoustic guitar and Clarinet)
- Manny Lopez – (Lower sixth)
- José Hernández – (vihuela and Trumpet)
- Jose Gaviria, Milton Salcedo, Bernardo Ossa and Daniel Betancourt – (Keyboards, Programming)
- Tedoy Mullet – (Percussion)
- Alfredo Oliva – (Concertino)

Production

- Producers: Kike Santander.
- Words and music topics: Kike Santander (except those mentioned).
- Arranger: Milton Salcedo, Bernardo Ossa and Daniel Betancourt.
- String Arrangements: Milton Salcedo
- Engineer: Esteban Aristizabal, Vicky Echeverri, Claudia Garcia, Juan Cristobal Losada, Boris Milan, Catalina Rodriguez.
- Engineering, programming and production under: Jose Gaviria.
- Musical Director: Antonio Morales.
- Contributors: Alberto Carballo Cabiedes, Sergio Minsky.
- Programming and Production Agreement: Milton Salcedo Rope.
- Executive Director and co-ordination of production: Andrés Felipe Silva.
- Recorded at: More Music, DB Music Productions Studios, Studio G, Miami, More Studios, Santander Studios, The Gallery Recording Studios Recording Studios and Ultrasound.
- Photographer: Adolfo Pérez Butron.
- Label: RCA Records, BMG Music, Ariola Records.
- Distributed by RCA International and Ariola International.

== Sales ==
| Region | Certification | Certified units/sales |
|---|---|---|
| Mexico | — | 75,000 |
