= Hay Amores y Amores =

Studio album by Rocío Dúrcal
- Released: April 25, 1995
- Recorded: 1995
- Genre: Balada; bolero; pop
- Length: 37:07
- Label: Sony BMG
- Producer: Roberto Livi

Rocío Dúrcal chronology
Desaires (1993)	Hay Amores y Amores (1995)	Juntos Otra Vez (1997)

Singles from Hay Amores y Amores
- 1. "Vestida De Blanco"; 2. "Cómo Han Pasado Los Años"; 3. "Que De Mí"; 4. "Culpa De Un Palomo"; 5. "Hay Amores y Amores"; 6. "De Que Estoy Hecha"

Hay Amores y Amores (English: There Are Many Loves) is the sixteenth studio album released by Spanish performer Rocío Dúrcal. It was released on April 25, 1995 by BMG Ariola and written and produced by Argentinean songwriter Roberto Livi. This album peaked at number-five on the Billboard Latin Pop Albums and number-twenty on Top Latin Albums. It was nominated for a Grammy Award in 1996 for Best Latin Pop Album.

Six singles were released from Hay Amores y Amores, all of which attained commercial success in the United States, the album's lead single "Vestida De Blanco" peaked at number 3 on the Billboard Hot Latin Tracks and number 5 on Latin Pop Airplay. Follow up singles "Cómo Han Pasado Los Años" and "Que De Mí" peaked within the top twenty of the chart.

== Track listing ==
No.	Title	Writer(s)	Length
1.	"Cómo Han Pasado Los Años"	Roberto Livi; Rafael Ferro	3:33
2.	"Corazón Sufrido"	Livi; Ferro	3:06
3.	"Qué De Mi"	Livi; Ferro	4:09
4.	"Vestida De Blanco"	Livi	3:21
5.	"De Menos A Más"	Ferro	4:22
6.	"De Que Estoy Hecha"	Livi; Ferro	3:38
7.	"Hay Amores y Amores"	Livi	3:22
8.	"Culpa De Un Palomo"	Livi; Ferro	3:09
9.	"Frases Hechas"	Livi	4:29
10.	"La Tercera Es La Vencida"	Livi; Bebu Silvetti	4:22
Total length:			37:07

== Awards and nominations ==
- Premios ACE (The Association of Latin Entertainment Critics)

Year	Title	Category	Result
1996	Rocío Dúrcal	Best Performer of the Year	Won
1996	Hay Amores y Amores	Best Song of the Year	Won

- Premio Aplauso (Miami)

Year	Title	Category	Result
1996	"Cómo Han Pasado Los Años"	Best Song of the Year	Won

- Grammy Award

Year	Title	Category	Result
1996	Hay Amores y Amores	Best Latin Pop Album	Nominated

== Charts ==
- Billboard Singles

Year	Single	Chart	Peak position
1995	"Cómo Han Pasado Los Años"	Billboard Hot Latin Tracks	17
1995	"Cómo Han Pasado Los Años"	Billboard Latin Pop Airplay	4
1995	"Vestida De Blanco"	Billboard Hot Latin Tracks	3
1995	"Vestida De Blanco"	Billboard Latin Pop Airplay	6
1995	"Vestida De Blanco"	Billboard Latin Regional Mexican Airplay	11
1996	"Qué De Mí"	Billboard Latin Pop Airplay	7

- Billboard albums

Chart (1995)	Peak position
U.S. Billboard Latin Pop Albums	5
U.S. Billboard Top Latin Albums	20

== Credits and personnel ==
Musicians

- Rocío Dúrcal – vocals
- Grant Geissman – guitar
- Pavel Farkas – concertmaster
- Teddy Mulet – trumpet
- Rafael Ferro – piano, keyboards
- Lester Mendez – keyboards
- Julio Hernandez – bass
- Lee Levin – drums
- Rafael Padilla – percussion
- Jeanny Cruz – chorus
- Rita Quintero – chorus
- George Noriega – chorus
- Raul Midon – chorus
- Paul Hoyle – chorus
- Rodolfo Castillo – chorus
- Wendy Pedersen – chorus

Production

- Roberto Livi – producer
- Rafael Ferro – arrangements, direction
- Mike Couzzi – mixing engineer
- Shawn Michael – strings engineer
- J.C. Ulloa – vocal engineer
- Ted Stein – detail engineer (Note: "Ingenieros (detalles)")
- Rod Taylor – detail engineer
- Adolfo Pérez Butron – photography
- Alan Simancas – makeup
- Lourdes Ladrón – design
