= Canción de Juventud =

Soundtrack album by Rocío Dúrcal
- Released: 1962
- Recorded: 1961–1962
- Genre: Pop
- Label: Philips-Phonogram (España)

Rocío Dúrcal chronology
Las Películas De Rocío Dúrcal (1962)	Canción de Juventud (1962)	Rocío de la Mancha (1963)

Canción de Juventud (transl. Song of Youth) is a 1962 Spanish-language musical-comedy film, directed by Luis Lucia and starring Rocío Dúrcal, Helga Liné & Carlos Estrada.

== Plot ==
Rocio is an orphan girl who is in a finishing school. She has fun teasing the boys from the neighboring school as she tries to fix a church. They found out the needed a large amount of money and the children decide to put on a talent show. Rocio is sad that her father won't come to the talent show, as he left her 5 years ago, so her friends try to reunite father & daughter for the talent show.

== Track list ==
1. "Volver a verte"
2. "La niña buena"
3. "La reunión"
4. "La luna se ha vuelto loca"
5. "Canción de juventud"
6. "Quisiera ser un ángel"
7. "Paraba papá"
8. "La hormiguita"
