= Siempre (Rocío Dúrcal album) =

Studio album by Rocío Dúrcal
- Released: 28 November 1986
- Recorded: 1986
- Genre: Latin pop
- Length: 36:59
- Label: RCA Ariola
- Producer: Juan Gabriel

Rocío Dúrcal chronology
Canta A Juan Gabriel Volumen 6 (1984)	Siempre (1986)	Canta Once Grandes Éxitos de Juan Gabriel (1987)

Singles from Siempre
- 1. "La Guirnalda"; 2. "Quédate Conmigo Esta Noche"; 3. "Infidelidad"; 4. "Siempre"; 5. "Hazlo Por Mi Corazón"; 6. "No Te Buscaré"

Professional ratings
Review scores
Source	Rating
AllMusic	3/5 stars

Siempre (Always) is the eleventh studio album by Spanish singer Rocío Dúrcal, released in 1986. This album includes the first number-one song ever in the Billboard Hot Latin Tracks chart: "La Guirnalda". The album also included "Quedate Conmigo Esta Noche", which peaked at number 4 on the Hot Latin Songs chart.

== Track listing ==
All tracks are written by Juan Gabriel.

No.	Title	Length
1.	"Quédate Conmigo Esta Noche"	3:50
2.	"Amándote"	4:04
3.	"Amor Discúlpame"	3:41
4.	"Siempre"	4:23
5.	"Hazlo Por Mi Corazón"	3:23
6.	"No Te Buscaré"	4:04
7.	"Infidelidad"	2:55
8.	"Obligado"	2:30
9.	"La Guirnalda"	4:06
10.	"Soñando"	3:58

== Personnel ==
Adapted from Allmusic.

- Rocío Dúrcal – Vocals
- Antonio Morales "Junior" – Vocals
- Shaila Dúrcal – Vocals
- Carmen Morales – Vocals
- Antonio Morales – Vocals
- Juan Gabriel – Arranger, producer
- Homero Patrón – Arrangement
- Ryan Ulyate – Engineer
- Joe Schiff - 2nd Engineer
- Alberto Reyna – Graphic design
- Joel García – Painting
- Joe Garcia – Painting

== Charts ==
- Billboard Singles

Year	Single	Chart	Peak position
1986	"La Guirnalda"	Hot Latin Tracks	1
1986	"Quédate Conmigo Esta Noche"	Hot Latin Tracks	4
1987	"Infidelidad"	Hot Latin Tracks	22
1987	"Siempre"	Hot Latin Tracks	10

- Billboard Albums

hart (1987)	Peak position
US Billboard Latin Pop Albums	2
