= Rocío Dúrcal =

Spanish singer and actress (1944–2006)

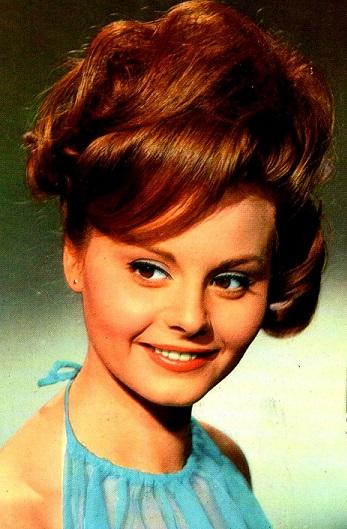
- Dúrcal in 1963
- Born: María de los Ángeles de las Heras Ortiz; 4 October 1944; Madrid, Spain
- Died: 25 March 2006 (aged 61); Madrid, Spain
- Resting place: Basilica of Our Lady of Guadalupe, Mexico City
- Other names: la Diva de Divas la Española más Mexicana la Novia de la Juventud la Reina de las Rancheras la Señora de la Canción; Marieta
- Occupations: Singer; actress
- Spouse: Antonio Morales Barreto (m. 1970)
- Children: 3, including Shaila Dúrcal
- Musical career
- Genres: Canción melódica; ranchera
- Instrument: Vocals
- Years active: 1959–2006
- Labels: Ariola Records; BMG Music; Sony BMG; Sony Music

María de los Ángeles de las Heras Ortiz (4 October 1944 – 25 March 2006), known professionally as Rocío Dúrcal (Spanish pronunciation: [roˈθi.o ˈðuɾkal]), was a Spanish singer and actress. Her career, which spanned more than four decades, began in the 1960s, when she established herself as an actress and singer thanks to the musical films she starred in. Later, she focused exclusively on her musical career, performing canción melódica, boleros, and rancheras, which led her to being considered one of the best Spanish-language singers of all time.

In Mexico she earned the sobriquet of Reina de las rancheras ("Queen of rancheras"). In 1999, she was inducted into the Billboard Latin Music Hall of Fame for her versatility and anthemic songs. In 2005, she received the Latin Grammy Lifetime Achievement Award. Also in 2005, she received the Life Achievement Award at the Premios de la Música in Spain. In 2023, Rolling Stone ranked her at number 139 on its list of the 200 Greatest Singers of All Time.

== Career ==
María de los Ángeles de las Heras Ortiz began her artistic career by participating in various radio song festivals and competitions, secretly supported by her paternal grandfather, who always believed in her talent and became her first fan. In 1959, with the approval of her parents, she participated in the television program Primer Aplauso, broadcast by Televisión Española (TVE). The theme that she chose for the contest was the traditional song "La sombra vendo". Luis Sanz, a manager who watched the show, was impressed by her talent and personality. He contacted TVE for the name and the address of the young contestant. Her stage name Rocío came from what she said was a nickname her grandfather gave her because she reminded him of morning dew (rocío matutino). For her stage surname, she and Sanz looked at a map of Spain on which she randomly pointed out the town of Dúrcal, in the province of Granada.

=== Acting ===
Her first film was Canción de juventud (1962) directed by Luis Lucia. The plot of the film portrayed a teenager with her own personality. The film scored huge box office and critics success not only in Spain, but also in other Spanish-speaking countries. The following year, she starred Rocío from La Mancha. After this, she got her first record deal with transnational Phonogram Inc.. The songs the artist played in both films served to make her first album with them, Las películas de Rocío Dúrcal (1963). Also in 1963, she starred in La chica del trébol.

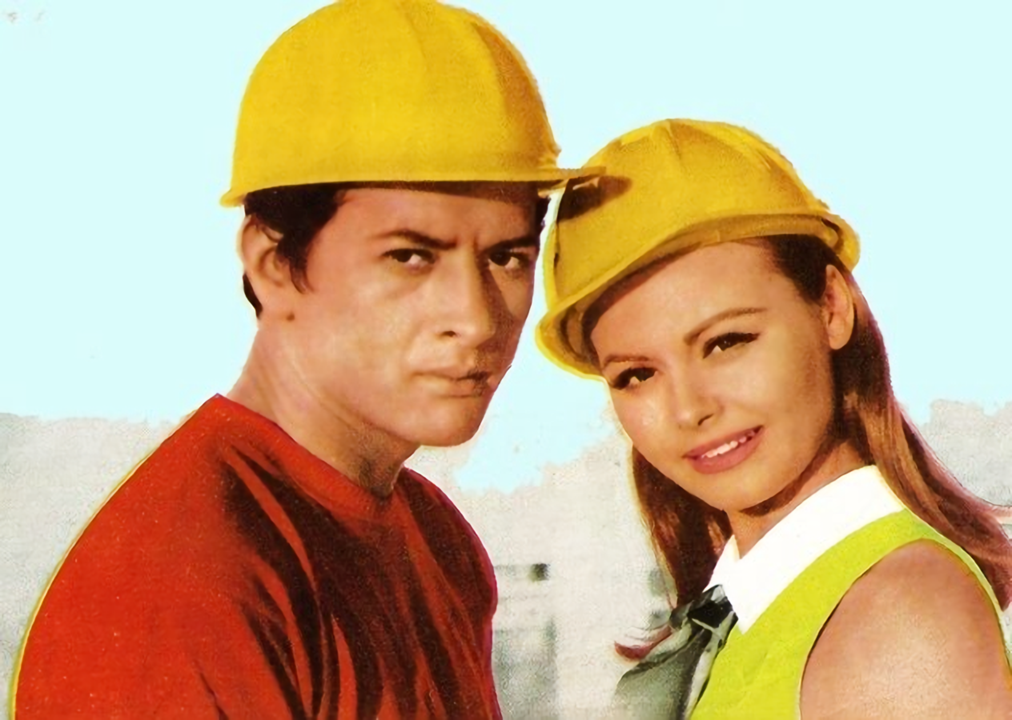
Dúrcal with Palito Ortega in Love in Flight (1967)

In her following film, Tengo 17 años (1964), she put aside her role of "child star". That same year, she appeared in her first theater play, Un domingo en Nueva York, in which she was revealed as a great theatrical actress. In 1965 she filmed Más bonita que ninguna; the band Los Brincos wrote some songs for the movie. In 1966, she shared the spotlight with Enrique Guzmán in the film Acompáñame. She began to perform duets with such singers as Jaime Morey and Amalia de Isaura. Then she co-starred in the film Love in Flight (1967) with the then young Argentine singer-songwriter Palito Ortega. In 1968 she filmed Cristina Guzmán, the first of her films that was aimed at an audience over 18.

Her last film was with Bárbara Rey in Me siento extraña in 1977.

=== Singing ===
In 1970, Dúrcal married Filipino-born musician Antonio Morales (known professionally as Júnior), who would manage her singing career. In 1970, he began a series of television shows in Spain and Latin America singing with his wife as a duet. Their first child, Carmen Morales, was born in December 1970. After the birth of their second child, Antonio, in April 1974, Júnior decided to give up his career to devote time to their children. Dúrcal meanwhile continued her film and singing career. In 1979 she had her third child, Shaila, who took up a singing career under the stage name of Shaila Dúrcal and is also a successful singer.

In 1977, Dúrcal signed a contract with Ariola Eurodisc (with singer-songwriter Camilo Sesto supporting her in her projects) dedicating herself to the musical career. That year, while in Mexico, she met the Mexican singer-songwriter Juan Gabriel, who decided to record a whole album of rancheras performed by Rocío Dúrcal entitled Rocío Dúrcal canta a Juan Gabriel. Without further advertising, the LP received high levels of sales, so Dúrcal and Juan Gabriel considered the possibility of a new recording together. They ended up doing 5 LPs, marking the revival of Rocío Dúrcal as a singer. The final collaboration between Dúrcal and Juan Gabriel emerged in 10 albums. Dúrcal's album named Canta A Juan Gabriel Volumen 6 (1984) is among the top ten best-selling albums in the history of Mexico. For this album Rocío Dúrcal received her first Grammy Award nomination.

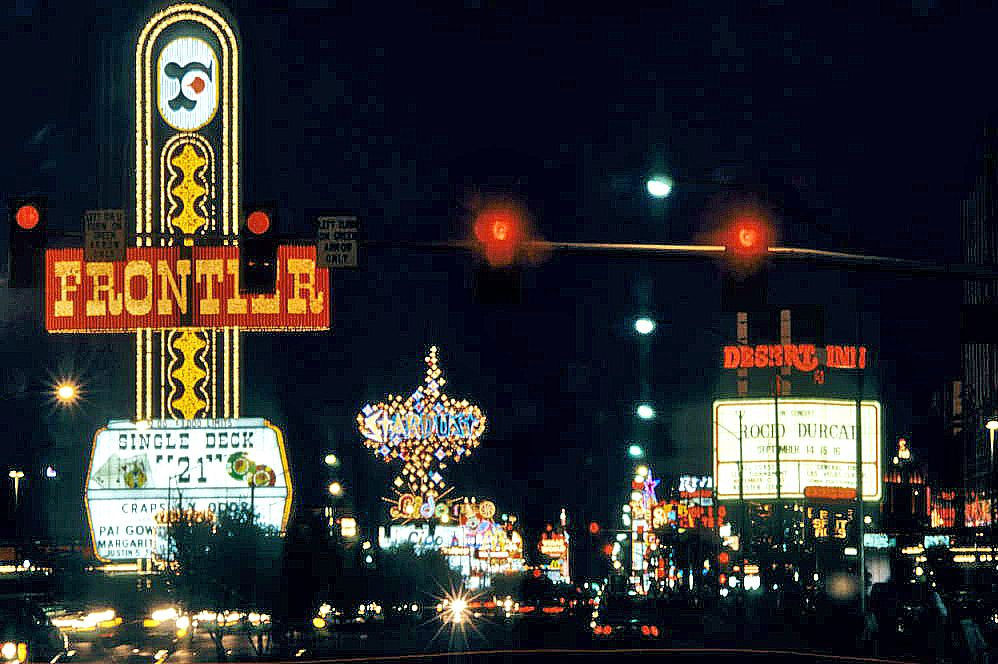
Billboard (below the Desert Inn) of three Dúrcal concerts in Las Vegas (1989).

The collaboration of Dúrcal with Juan Gabriel was interrupted by disagreements between the artists and because of problems of Juan Gabriel with his record label, so Dúrcal continued to record albums with other songwriters such as Marco Antonio Solís and Rafael Pérez Botija (who produced for her, and wrote most of the songs for, the ballads album, Confidencias). In 1988 she recorded the album Como Tu Mujer with producer Marco Antonio Solis.

In 1990, she recorded her first album on CD format entitled Si te pudiera mentir. In 1991, Durcal offered a concert at the National Auditorium in Mexico City, recorded in a double disc El Concierto... En Vivo. Between 1992 and 1993 she recorded the album Desaires, produced by the Mexican singer and songwriter Joan Sebastián. In this album she reprises ranchera.

In 1995, she launched her production Hay Amores Y Amores, with songs written and produced by the Argentine Roberto Livi. For this album she was nominated again to the Grammy Awards in the category "Best Latin Pop Album". In 1997 the double album Juntos Otra Vez brought Rocío Dúrcal and Juan Gabriel together again for the last time. That album was made by an engagement with the record company and not by the desire of both artists to continue to cooperate.

In 1998, under the direction of Luis Sanz, she starred in the TVE comedy series Los negocios de mamá. In 2000, she celebrated forty years in the industry. In that year she returned to ranchera music with the album Caricias, under the production of songwriter and producer Bebu Silvetti. In 2001 Rocío Dúrcal recorded Entre Tangos y Mariachi, again produced by Bebu Silvetti, an album that includes 10 of the most famous Argentine tango arrangements interpreted with ranchero/bolero style like her previous album. In the summer of 2001 Dúrcal made a successful tour in Spain, 13 years after her last Spanish performance.

After a year and a half absence, she returned to the stage on 19 September 2002 with a concert at the National Auditorium in Mexico, which was recorded in a double album that was released on CD and then on DVD on 22 October 2002, En Concierto... Inolvidable. The album was nominated for a Latin Grammy Award. In 2003, the artist received another Latin Grammy Award nomination for her album Caramelito, produced by Kike Santander. In May 2004 she returned to Spain to record what would be her last album, Alma Ranchera, which was nominated for a Latin Grammy Award.

== Illness and death ==
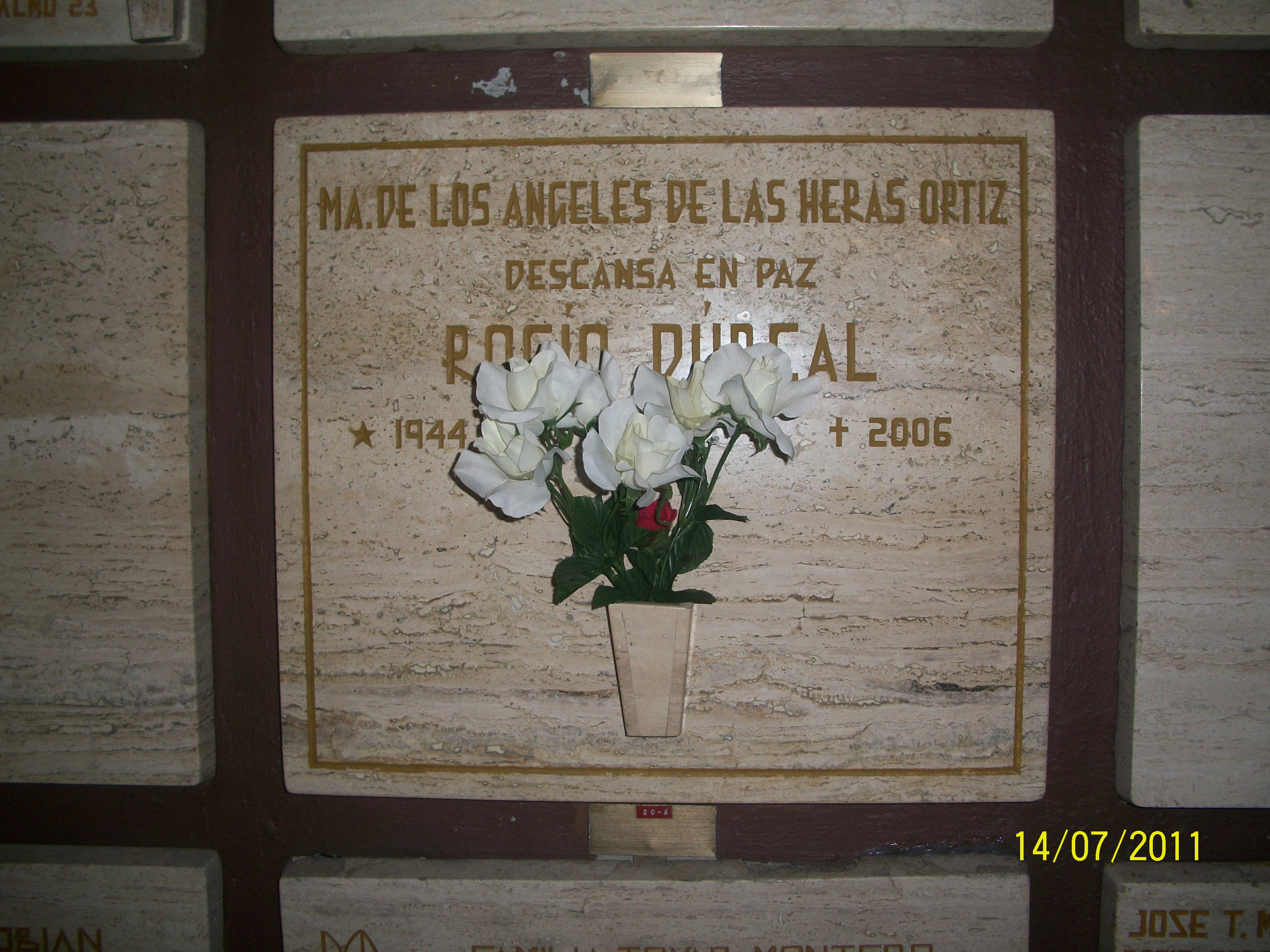
Dúrcal's crypt located at Basilica of Our Lady of Guadalupe in Mexico City

In 2001, after recording her album Entre Tangos y Mariachi, Dúrcal was diagnosed with uterine cancer. Dúrcal canceled her tours while undergoing medical treatment, and resumed touring in 2002. In 2003, from Spain, she collaborated with the Mexican singer Julio Preciado for a duet in the song "Si nos dejan" included in his album Que me siga la tambora.

Rocío Dúrcal died on 25 March 2006 at the age of 61 from uterine cancer at her home in Torrelodones, Madrid. She was cremated and a portion of her ashes were scattered in Spain while the remainder of her ashes were deposited into a crypt at Basilica of Our Lady of Guadalupe in Mexico City, the same place where years later a portion of the ashes from her husband Antonio Morales who died in 2014, were also deposited next to her.

== Discography ==
=== Albums ===
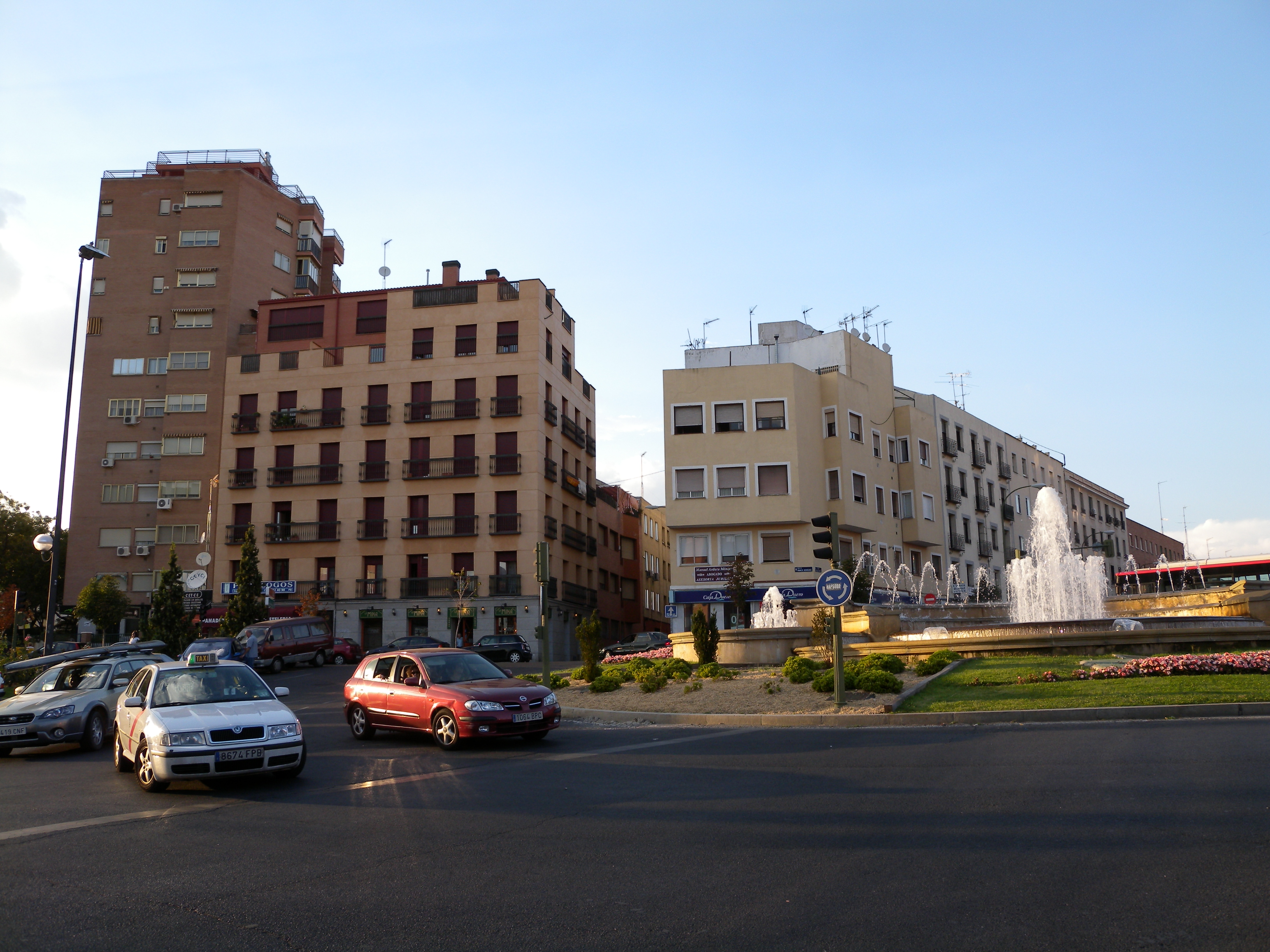
Roundabout named Rocío Dúrcal, located in Madrid, Spain

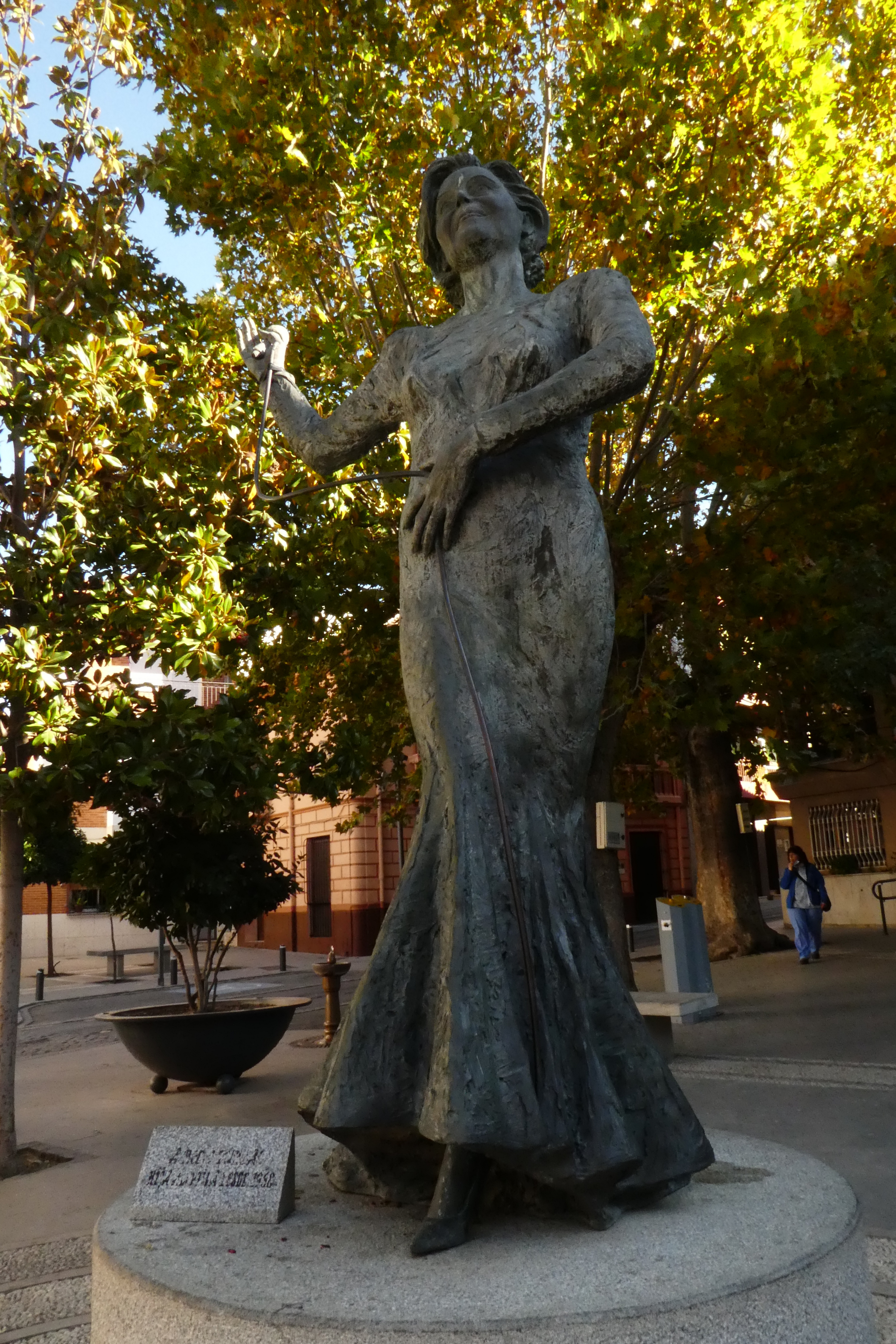
A statue in her honor in Dúrcal, Spain.

Philips-Phonogram

- 1962: Canción de juventud
- 1963: Rocío de la Mancha
- 1963: Las películas de Rocío Dúrcal
- 1964: La chica del trébol / La cenicienta del barrio
- 1964: Rocío, canta flamenco (EP)
- 1964: Tengo 17 Años
- 1964: Villancicos de Rocío (EP)
- 1964: Villancicos con Rocío Dúrcal (EP)
- 1965: Más bonita que ninguna
- 1966: Acompáñame
- 1967: Buenos días, condesita
- 1967: Amor en el aire
- 1968: Cristina Guzmán
- 1970: Las Leandras
- 1972: La novicia rebelde / La novicia soñadora

Ariola Eurodisc

- 1977: Una vez más (Pronto)
- 1977: Canta a Juan Gabriel Volumen I (Pronto)
- 1978: Canta a Juan Gabriel Volumen II (Pronto)
- 1979: Súper Éxitos De Juan Gabriel (Canta a Juan Gabriel Volumen III) (Pronto)
- 1980: Canta con Mariachi Volumen IV (Producida por Juan Gabriel) (Pronto)
- 1981: Canta a Juan Gabriel Volumen V (Cuando Decidas Volver) (Pronto)
- 1981: Confidencias / La Gata (Pronto)
- 1982: Canta Lo Romántico De Juan Gabriel (Boleros) (Pronto)
- 1983: Entre tú y yo (Ariola)
- 1984: Canta A Juan Gabriel Volumen 6 (Jardin De Rosas) (Ariola)
- 1986: Siempre (Ariola)
- 1987: Canta 11 Grandes Éxitos De Juan Gabriel (Ariola)
- 1988: Como Tu Mujer (Ariola)
- 1990: Si Te Pudiera Mentir (Ariola)
- 1992: El Concierto... En Vivo (Ariola)
- 1992: Mis mejores canciones
- 1993: Desaires (Ariola/BMG)
- 1995: Hay Amores Y Amores (Ariola/BMG)

BMG

- 1997: Juntos Otra Vez (con Juan Gabriel)
- 1999: Para Toda La Vida
- 2000: Caricias
- 2001: Entre Tangos Y Mariachi
- 2002: En Concierto... Inolvidable
- 2002: Todo Éxitos
- 2003: Caramelito
- 2004: Alma Ranchera
- 2004: Su Historia y Exitos Musicales Volumen 1
- 2004: Su Historia y Exitos Musicales Volumen 2
- 2004: Su Historia y Exitos Musicales Volumen 3
- 2005: Lo Esencial

Sony BMG

- 2005: Me Gustas Mucho
- 2005: El Concierto... En Vivo
- 2006: Amor Eterno
- 2007: Rocío Dúrcal Canta a México
- 2009: Duetos
- 2010: Mis favoritas
- 2012: Como dos gotas de agua
- 2012: Canciones de amor
- 2012: Eternamente

=== Singles ===
Title	Year	Chart positions		Album
Title	Year	US Latin	US Latin Pop	Album
"La guirnalda"	1986	1	—	Siempre
"Quédate conmigo esta noche"	1986	4	—	Siempre
"Siempre"	1987	10	—	Siempre
"Infidelidad"	1987	22	—	Siempre
"La hora del adios" (with Dyango)	1987	5	—	Cada día me acuerdo más de ti by Dyango
"Con todo y mi tristeza"	1988	24		
"El día que me acaricies lloraré"	1988	38		Canta once grandes éxitos de Juan Gabriel
"Como tu mujer"	1988	1	—	Como tu mujer
"¿Qué esperabas de mí?"	1989	4	—	Como tu mujer
"El amor más bonito"	1989	9	—	Como tu mujer
"Extrañándote"	1989	8	—	Como tu mujer
"Por qué tanta soledad"	1989	18	—	Como tu mujer
"Ya te olvidé"	1990	12	—	Como tu mujer
"Te amo"	1990	5	—	Si Te Pudiera Mentir
"La balanza"	1991	10	—	Si Te Pudiera Mentir
"Falso"	1991	33	—	Si Te Pudiera Mentir
"A que me quedo contigo"	1991	7	—	Si Te Pudiera Mentir
"Si piensas, si quieres" (with Roberto Carlos)	1992	1	—	Roberto Carlos 1992 by Roberto Carlos
"Fue un placer conocerte" (with Juan Gabriel)	1992	10	—	El Concierto... En Vivo
"Como amigos"	1992	27	—	El Concierto... En Vivo
"Y nos dieron las diez" (with Joaquin Sabina)	1993	16		
"Desaires"	1994	4	—	Desaires
"Mi credo"	1994	14	—	Desaires
"Vestida de blanco"	1995	3	6	Hay Amores y Amores
"Como han pasado los años"	1995	17	4	Hay Amores y Amores
"Qué de mí"	1995	—	7	Hay Amores y Amores
"El destino"(with Juan Gabriel)	1997	1	6	Juntos Otra Vez
"La incertidumbre"	1997	11	—	Juntos Otra Vez
"Así son los hombres"	1997	40		Juntos Otra Vez
"No me digas"	1997	27		Juntos Otra Vez
"Para toda la vida"	1999	22	10	Para Toda la Vida
"Porque te quiero"	2000	26	19	Caricias
"Infiel"	2001	3	5	Caricias
"Sombras...¡nada más!"	2001	16	9	Entre Tangos y Mariachis

== Filmography ==
Year	Title	Role	Director
1962	Canción de juventud	Rocío Luzón	Luis Lucia
1963	Rocío from La Mancha	Rocío / Isabel	Luis Lucia
1964	La chica del trébol	Rocío	Sergio Grieco
1964	Tengo 17 años	Rocío / Natalia	José María Forqué
1965	Más bonita que ninguna	Luisa / Luisito	Luis César Amadori
1966	Acompáñame	Mercedes	Luis César Amadori
1967	Good Morning, Little Countess	María	Luis César Amadori
1967	Love in Flight	Clara	Luis César Amadori
1968	Cristina Guzmán	Cristina / Mara	Luis César Amadori
1969	Las Leandras	Patricia	Eugenio Martín
1972	The Rebellious Novice	Gloria	Luis Lucia
1972	Marianela	Marianela	Angelino Fons
1974	Díselo con flores	Úrsula	Pierre Grimblat
1977	Me siento extraña	Laura	Enrique Martí Maqueda

== Television ==
Year	Show	Role	Director	Network
1977	Mujeres insólitas (La sierpe del Nilo)	Cleopatra	Cayetano Luca de Tena	Televisión Española
1997	Los negocios de mamá	Ana	Luis Sanz	Televisión Española

== Theatre ==
Year	Title	Author
1964	Un domingo en Nueva York	Adolfo Marsillach
1974	La muchacha sin retorno	Santiago Moncada
1977	Contacto peculiar	Adolfo Marsillach

== See also ==
- List of best-selling Latin music artists
