= Rocío from La Mancha =

- Spanish: Rocío de La Mancha
- Directed by: Luis Lucia
- Written by: Luis Lucia; José Luis Colina
- Starring: Rocío Dúrcal; Carlos Estrada; Helga Liné; Roberto Camardiel; Carmen Lozano; Simón Andreu; José María Caffarel
- Cinematography: Antonio L. Ballesteros
- Music by: Augusto Algueró
- Color process: Eastmancolor
- Production company: Época films S.A.
- Distributed by: Dipenfa S.A.
- Release date: 14 April 1963
- Running time: 97 minutes
- Country: Spain
- Language: Spanish

Rocío from La Mancha is a 1963 Spanish musical film directed by Luis Lucia and starring Rocío Dúrcal.

== Plot ==
A car accident changes an orphan's life as she becomes the legal guardian of her four brothers. She meets a woman who sets to return to her husband who is in Paris by asking Rocio to pretend that she is Isabel (the woman's daughter). The father (Carlos Estrada) hasn't seen her in 13 years and doesn't know that the real Isabel is dead.

== Cast ==
- Rocío Dúrcal
- Carlos Estrada
- Helga Liné
- Roberto Camardiel
- Carmen Lozano
- Simón Andreu
- José María Caffarel
