= Amalia de Isaura =

Spanish actress

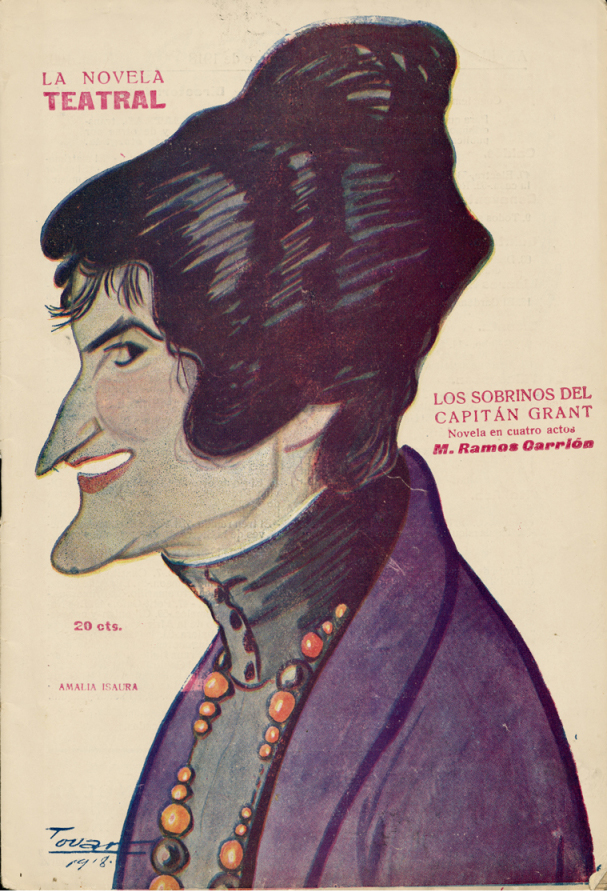
- Born: 24 June 1887; Madrid, Spain
- Died: 22 December 1971 (aged 84); Madrid, Spain
- Other name: Amalia de Isaura Pérez
- Occupation: Actress
- Years active: 1924-1970

Amalia de Isaura (1887–1971) was a Spanish stage and film actress.

== Selected filmography ==
- The Pure Truth (1931)
- Madrid Carnival (1941)
- Accompany Me (1966)
- Love in Flight (1967)
- Pepa Doncel (1969)

== Bibliography ==
- Goble, Alan. The Complete Index to Literary Sources in Film. Walter de Gruyter, 1 Jan 1999.
