= Alma Ranchera =

Studio album by Rocío Dúrcal
- Released: 14 September 2004
- Recorded: 2004; La Bodega, Mexico, D.F. and Torres Sonido, Madrid, Spain
- Genre: Ranchera
- Length: 38:47
- Labels: RCA, BMG Music
- Producers: Memo Gil, Carlos Cabral "Junior"

Rocío Dúrcal chronology
| Caramelito (2003) | Alma Ranchera (2004) | Me Gustas Mucho (2005) |

Singles from Alma Ranchera
- 1. "Échame A Mí La Culpa"; 2. "Si Dios Me Quita La Vida"; 3. "Cucurrucucú Paloma"; 4. "Fallastes Corazón"; 5. "La Media Vuelta"

Alma Ranchera (Ranchera Soul) is the twenty-second and final studio album by Spanish singer Rocío Dúrcal. It was released on September 14, 2004, by BMG and RCA. Produced by Memo Gil and Carlos Cabral "Junior", the album is a tribute to ranchera music.

Alma Ranchera features eleven cover versions of classic songs written by famous Mexican composers, including José Alfredo Jiménez, Cuco Sánchez, José Ángel Espinoza, Rubén Fuentes, and Tomás Méndez. It also includes a previously unreleased song, "Vete A Volar", which was written by Jaime Flores, Luis Carlos Monroy and Raúl Ornelas. In 2005, the album was nominated for the Grammy Award for Best Mexican/Mexican-American Album and the Latin Grammy Award for Best Ranchero Album.

== Track listing ==
| | Title | Writer(s) | Length |
|---|---|---|---|
| 1. | "Un Mundo Raro" | José Alfredo Jiménez | 3:40 |
| 2. | "Si Dios Me Quita La Vida" | Luis Demetrio Traconis | 3:13 |
| 3. | "Cucurrucucú Paloma" | Tomás Méndez Sosa | 4:30 |
| 4. | "Fallaste Corazón" | Cuco Sánchez | 3:36 |
| 5. | "Sufro Tu Ausencia" | Juan Neri | 3:05 |
| 6. | "Fiesta En El Corazón" | Alberto Cervantes, Rubén Fuentes | 2:17 |
| 7. | "Amanecí En Tus Brazos" | José Alfredo Jiménez | 3:44 |
| 8. | "Échame A Mí La Culpa" | José Ángel Espinoza "Ferrusquilla" | 2:51 |
| 9. | "La Media Vuelta" | Jiménez | 2:44 |
| 10. | "Esta Tristeza Mía" | Antonio Valdez Herrera | 2:52 |
| 11. | "Te Parto El Alma" | Cuco Sánchez | 3:16 |
| 12. | "Vete A Volar" | Jaime Flores, Luis Carlos Monroy, Raúl Ornelas | 3:23 |

== Awards ==
| Year | Award | Category | Result |
|---|---|---|---|
| 2005 | Grammy Award | Best Mexican/Mexican-American Album | Nominated |
| 2005 | Latin Grammy Award | Best Ranchero Album | Nominated |

== Credits and personnel ==
Musicians

- Rocío Dúrcal – (Vocals)
- Group "Esto es México" – (Chorus of mariachi)
- Claudia Angelica and Sorrel – (Vocals)
- Ariadne Gobera – (Vocals)
- Jair Alcalá – (Accordion)
- Lupe Alfaro – (Vihuela)
- Carlos Cabral, "Junior" – (Lead Guitar, Keyboards)
- Dave Rivera – (Guitarrón)
- Paco Rosas – (Acoustic guitar and Arrangements)
- Fernando de Santiago – (Vocals, Rhythm Guitar, Vihuela, Songs and Arrangements)
- Marco Antonio Santiago – (Guitar)
- Javier Serrano – (Trumpet and Bugle)
- Moses Tlaxcaltécatl – (Flute)

Production

- Producers: Memo Gil and Carlos Cabral "Junior".
- Arrangers: Manuel Cazares.
- Programming, Audio Mixing and Arrangements: Memo Gil.
- Arrangers: Rigoberto Alfaro.
- Audio Mix: Isaiah G. Asbún.
- Mastering: Ron Boustead.
- Latin Percussion: Armando Montiel.
- Musical Director: Antonio Morales.
- Session string: Enrique Ramos.
- Programming and Arrangements: Pancho Ruiz.
- Percussion Symphony: Francisco Sanchez.
- Copies of scores: Oscar Wilde.
- Recorded at: La Bodega, Mexico, D.F. and Torres Sound, Madrid, Spain.
- Label: RCA, BMG Music.
- Manufactured and Distributed by: BMG Music, RCA Records.
