= Canta A Juan Gabriel Volumen 6 =

Studio album by Rocío Dúrcal
- Released: 1984
- Recorded: 1984
- Genre: Pop
- Label: Ariola Eurodisc

Rocío Dúrcal chronology
Entre Tú Y Yo (1983)	Canta A Juan Gabriel Volumen 6 (1984)	Siempre (1986)

Canta A Juan Gabriel Volumen 6 (also released as Amor Eterno in Mexico and Jardín de Rosas in Spain) is the tenth studio album by Spanish singer and actress Rocío Dúrcal, which was released in 1984 by Ariola Eurodisc. The songs in the album were written by Mexican singer/songwriter Juan Gabriel who also appeared on the album. Déjame Vivir is one of her biggest hits and the video was a huge hit as well with special guest Juan Gabriel. The album was nominated for a Grammy Award for Best Mexican-American Performance. The album was inducted into the Latin Grammy Hall of Fame in 2013.

== Track listing ==
All tracks written and produced by Juan Gabriel.

Canta a Juan Gabriel Volumen 6
No.	Title	Length
1.	"Estás Tan Dentro de Mi"	3:02
2.	"De Serenata"	3:02
3.	"El Canalla"	2:52
4.	"Déjame Vivir (duet with Juan Gabriel)"	3:43
5.	"Amor Eterno"	6:50
6.	"Te Dedico Esta Canción"	3:10
7.	"Perdóname, Olvídalo (duet with Juan Gabriel)"	3:39
8.	"Te Quiero Mucho, Mucho (duet with Juan Gabriel)"	3:36
9.	"Diferentes"	3:23
10.	"Costumbres"	4:33

=== Notes ===
- In the Spanish releases, the tracklist is slightly arranged and "Estás Tan Dentro de Mi" is replaced with "Jamás Te Prometí un Jardín de Rosas", also a duet with Juan Gabriel.

== Charts ==
Chart (1985)	Peak position
US Latin Pop Albums	2

== Credits and personnel ==
- Rocío Dúrcal – Vocals
- Juan Gabriel – Vocals Arranger, Record producer
- Juan Gabriel – writer, composer
- Mariachi Arriba Juárez – Arrangement
- Sylvia Polakow – Photographs
- Cheska – Stylist
