= Confidencias (Rocío Dúrcal album) =

Studio album by Rocío Dúrcal
- Released: October 12, 1981
- Recorded: 1981
- Length: 38:26
- Label: Ariola Records
- Producer: Rafael Pérez Botija

Rocío Dúrcal chronology
Canta A Juan Gabriel Volumen 5 (1981)	Confidencias (1981)	Canta Lo Romántico De Juan Gabriel (1982)

Singles from Confidencias
- 1. "No Sirvo Para Estar Sin Ti"; 2. "La Gata Bajo la Lluvia" Released: 1981; 3. "La Verdad De La Verdad"; 4. "Marinero"; 5. "¿Por Qué Me Tratas Así? (in Mexico)"; 6. "Dicen (in Mexico)"; 7. "Una Noche Loca (in Spain)"

Confidencias (English: Secrets) is the seventh studio album by Spanish performer Rocío Dúrcal, released in 1981 by Ariola Records. It was written and produced by Spanish songwriter Rafael Pérez Botija. In Spain, Argentina, and Peru, this album was released as La Gata (The Cat).

Seven singles were released from Confidencias. The first two, "No Sirvo Para Estar Sin Ti" (I'm Not Good At Being Without You) and "La Gata Bajo la Lluvia" (The Cat In The Rain), became hits in Latin America and Spain. The latter song was also featured in the 1989 Spanish film La Blanca Paloma (The White Dove), directed by Juan Miñón and starring Antonio Banderas; and also in the first season finale of Drag Race España in 2021.

== Track listing ==
No.	Title	Writer(s)	Length
1.	"No Sirvo Para Estar Sin Ti"	Rafael Pérez Botija	3:52
2.	"La Verdad de la Verdad"	Botija	4:32
3.	"Dicen"	Botija	4:13
4.	"Marinero"	Botija	3:44
5.	"Lo Que Tú Sientes"	Botija	3:11
6.	"La Gata Bajo la Lluvia"	Botija	3:44
7.	"Adiós"	Botija	3:28
8.	"¿Por Qué Me Tratas Así?"	Camilo Blanes	3:39
9.	"Tu Pasado"	Felipe Campuzano	3:33
10.	"Ríndete"	Botija	4:25
Total length:			38:26

=== Notes ===
- In the Spanish releases, "¿Por Qué Me Tratas Así?" is replaced with "Una Noche Loca," written by J. Carlos Calderón.
- In the Contemporary Midline (CD) release (Ariola 6073-2-RL), "Tu Pasado" is also credited to I. Román. It is unknown if this is true.

== Personnel ==
- Rocío Dúrcal – vocals
- Rafael Pérez Botija – musical arrangements and direction, producer
- Kornel Kobach – musical arrangements and direction for track 4

== Certifications ==
Region	Certification
Mexico	Platinum
Spain	Gold
Venezuela	Gold
