= Hot Latin Songs =

Record chart in the United States for Latin songs

The Billboard magazine logo

The Billboard Hot Latin Songs (formerly Hot Latin Tracks and Hot Latin 50) is a record chart in the United States for Latin songs, published weekly by Billboard magazine. Since October 2012, chart rankings are based on digital sales, radio airplay, and online streaming, and only predominantly Spanish-language songs are allowed to rank. The chart was established by the magazine on September 6, 1986, and was originally based on airplay on Latin music radio stations. Although the chart predominantly allows Spanish-language songs, songs in English and Portuguese have charted.

The first number one song of the Hot Latin Songs chart was "La Guirnalda" by Rocío Dúrcal on September 6, 1986. As of the issue dated November 21, 2026, the chart has had 470 different number one hits, while 194 artists have reached number one (as a lead or a featured act). The current number-one song on the chart is "Bby Wow" by Karol G with Judeline and Rusowsky.

== History ==
On September 6, 1986, Billboard premiered a Latin music singles chart, the Hot Latin 50. During the late 1980s, musical data was compiled by the Billboard magazine-affiliated chart and research department, with information from 70 Spanish-language radio stations in the United States and Puerto Rico. Those radio stations were selected based on their number of listeners, being asked to report their playlists for the week. Since 1994, this data has been compiled by Nielsen Broadcast Data Systems (BDS), which electronically monitors radio stations in more than 120 music markets across the United States. Before The Hot Latin Songs chart's inception, the Latin music information on the magazine was presented only in the form of the biweekly album sales chart, or Top Latin Albums, which continues to be listed separately. There were no language restrictions on the chart, since a few songs in English and Portuguese have charted (and even reached number one) on five occasions. Three genre-specific Latin "sub-charts" were introduced and were factored into the Hot Latin Songs chart, namely Latin Pop Airplay, Regional Mexican Airplay, and Latin Tropical Airplay. A fourth sub-chart, the Latin Rhythm Airplay chart, was established in 2005 in response to the growing popularity of Latin hip hop, urbano and reggaetón music.

According to the Billboard electronic database, the first number one song on the Hot Latin 50 was "La Guirnalda", by Spanish singer Rocío Dúrcal, on September 6, 1986. However, in the listings included in the first printed publication of the chart, on October 4, 1986, the first number-one song was "Yo No Sé Qué Me Pasó", by Mexican singer-songwriter Juan Gabriel. In 2016, Billboard stated that the chart was introduced on the issue dated October 4, 1986, but the magazine's official website recognizes the previous issues from September 6, 1986, to September September 27, 1986, as well as Rocío Durcal's number one on the debut issue.

Due to the increasing popularity of downloads sales and streaming data, Billboard updated the methodology for the Hot Latin Songs chart on October 11, 2012, to include digital sales and streaming activity in addition to airplay, as well as making only predominantly Spanish-language songs eligible for inclusion and increasing airplay data to more than 1,200 radio stations across the United States. The chart's previous methodology was formatted to the Latin Airplay chart with the Latin genre-charts now being component charts of the Latin Airplay chart.

=== Component charts ===
There are several component charts that contribute to the overall calculation of Hot Latin Songs. These are:

- Latin Digital Song Sales: The chart measures the best-selling Spanish-language digital songs. It was established on January 23, 2010. "Loba" by Shakira was the first number-one song on the chart. "Danza Kuduro" by Don Omar featuring Lucenzo is the longest-running number-one, with 94 non-consecutive weeks from May 14, 2011, to July 20, 2013.
- Latin Streaming Songs: The chart measures the most-streamed Spanish-language songs and videos on selected online music services. It was established on April 20, 2013. "Hips Don't Lie" by Shakira featuring Wyclef Jean was the first number-one song on the chart. "Bailando" by Enrique Iglesias featuring Descemer Bueno and Gente de Zona is the longest-leading number-one, with 66 non-consecutive weeks from May 17, 2014, to April 30, 2016.
- Four subgenre charts: Hot Latin Pop Songs, Hot Regional Mexican Songs, Hot Latin Rhythm Songs, and Hot Tropical Songs, which rank the best-performing songs (combining airplay, sales and streaming) on their respective genre charts. They were established on April 8, 2025.

== Compilation ==
The tracking week for sales and streaming begins on Friday and ends on Thursday, while the radio play tracking-week runs from Monday to Sunday. A new chart is compiled and officially released to the public by Billboard on Tuesday. Each chart is post-dated with the "week-ending" issue date four days after the charts are refreshed online (i.e., the following Saturday). For example:

- Friday, January 1 – sales tracking-week begins, streaming tracking-week begins
- Monday, January 4 – airplay tracking-week begins
- Thursday, January 7 – sales tracking-week ends, streaming tracking-week ends
- Sunday, January 10 – airplay tracking-week ends
- Tuesday, January 12 – new chart released, with issue post-dated Saturday, January 16

== Hot Latin Songs policy changes ==
The methods and policies by which this data is obtained and compiled have changed many times throughout the chart's history.

=== Digital downloads, linguistic requirement, and online streaming ===
Since October 11, 2012, the Billboard Hot Latin Songs tracks paid digital downloads and streaming activity. Billboard initially started tracking downloads since January 10, 2010, with the Latin Digital Songs chart. However, these downloads did not count towards Hot Latin Songs. In addition, Billboard imposed a linguistic requirement; a song must be predominantly sung in Spanish to be eligible to rank on the chart. A component Latin Streaming Songs chart was introduced on April 20, 2013, which ranks web radio streams from services such as Spotify, as well as on-demand audio titles.

=== Recurrents ===
Billboard, in an effort to allow the chart to remain as current as possible and to give proper representation to new and developing artists and tracks, has removed titles that have reached certain criteria regarding its current rank and number of weeks on the chart. A song is permanently moved to "recurrent status" if it had spent 20 weeks on Hot Latin Songs and fallen below position number 25. Additionally, descending songs were removed from the chart if ranking below number 10 after 26 weeks or below number five after 52 weeks. As of the chart dated October 25, 2025, descending songs are also removed from Hot Latin Songs after 78 weeks if falling below No. 3.

== Records ==
=== Songs ===
==== Top 10 songs of All-Time (1986–2026) ====
In 2016, for the 30th anniversary of Hot Latin Songs, Billboard magazine compiled a ranking of the 50 best-performing songs on the chart over the 30 years, along with the best-performing artists. Billboard has stated that "due to changes in chart methodology over the years, eras are weighted differently to account for chart turnover rates over various periods." The top 20 was updated in 2018. It was also updated in September 2021. The latest update was published in October 2026.

Rank	Single	Artist(s)	Year released	Peak and duration	Ref.
1.	"Despacito"	Luis Fonsi and Daddy Yankee featuring Justin Bieber	2017	#1 for 56 weeks	
2.	"Propuesta Indecente"	Romeo Santos	2013	#1 for 4 weeks	
3.	"DTMF"	Bad Bunny	2025	#1 for 72 weeks	
4.	"Dákiti"	Bad Bunny and Jhayco	2020	#1 for 27 weeks	
5.	"A Puro Dolor"	Son by Four	2000	#1 for 20 weeks	
6.	"Si Tú Supieras"	Alejandro Fernández	1997	#1 for 6 weeks	
7.	"Ritmo"	Black Eyed Peas and J Balvin	2019	#1 for 24 weeks	
8.	"No Me Doy por Vencido"	Luis Fonsi	2008	#1 for 19 weeks	
9.	"El Perdón"	Nicky Jam and Enrique Iglesias	2015	#1 for 30 weeks	
10.	"Me Porto Bonito"	Bad Bunny and Chencho	2022	#1 for 20 weeks	

==== Most weeks at number one ====
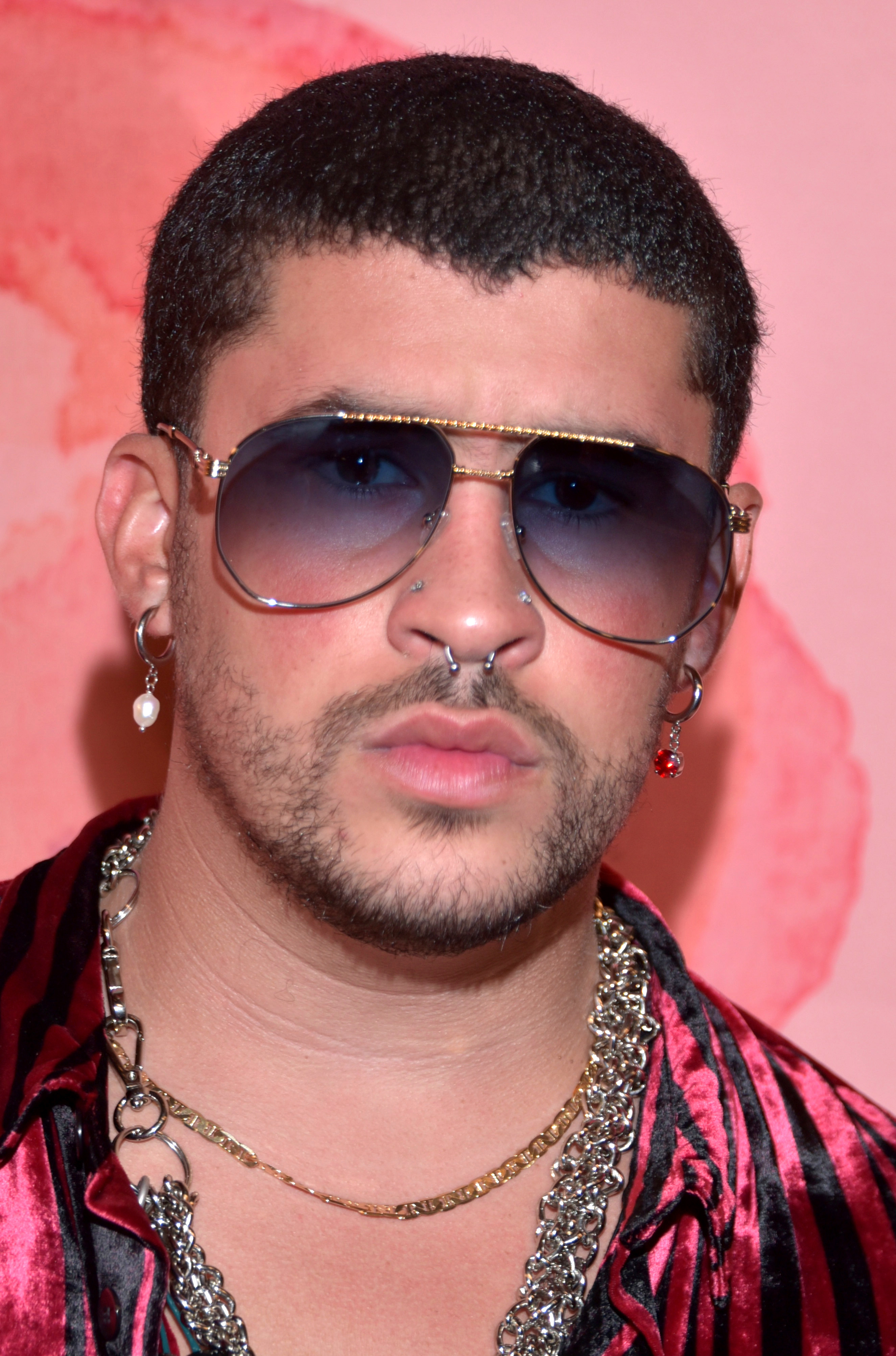
"DTMF" by Bad Bunny is the longest-running number one song on the chart, with 72 weeks at the top

- 72 weeks – Bad Bunny – "DTMF" (2025)
- 56 weeks – Luis Fonsi and Daddy Yankee, featuring Justin Bieber – "Despacito" (2017) (Note: The original version of "Despacito" by Luis Fonsi featuring Daddy Yankee remained at number one for 12 weeks before the remix version featuring Justin Bieber was combined to the chart entry on May 6, 2017.)
- 41 weeks – Enrique Iglesias featuring Descemer Bueno and Gente de Zona – "Bailando" (2014)
- 30 weeks – Nicky Jam and Enrique Iglesias – "El Perdón" (2015)
- 27 weeks – Bad Bunny and Jhay Cortez – "Dakiti" (2021)
- 26 weeks – Farruko – "Pepas" (2021)

==== Most total weeks ====
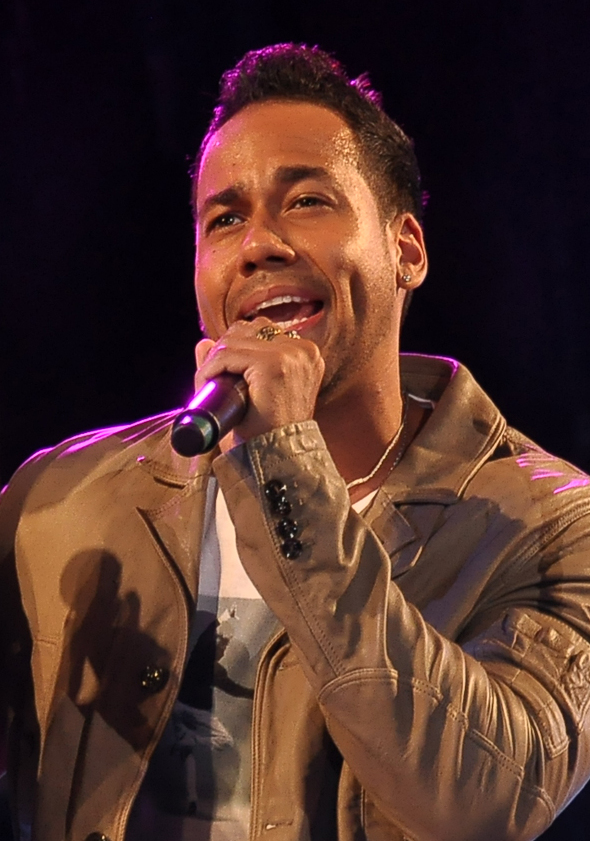
"Propuesta Indecente" by Romeo Santos has the most charting weeks, with 125 from 2013 to 2015.

- 125 weeks – Romeo Santos – "Propuesta Indecente" (2013)
- 110 weeks – Luis Fonsi and Daddy Yankee, featuring Justin Bieber – "Despacito" (2017)
- 97 weeks – Bad Bunny – "DTMF" (2025)
- 83 weeks – Bad Bunny – "Eoo" (2025)
- 79 weeks – Bad Bunny and Jhay Cortez – "Dakiti" (2020)
- 78 weeks – Bad Bunny – "Baile Inolvidable" and "Nuevayol" (2025)
- 62 weeks – Prince Royce – "Incondicional" (2012)
- 61 weeks – Son by Four – "A Puro Dolor" (2000)

=== Top 10 artists of all-time (1986–2026) ===
In 2016, for the 30th anniversary of Hot Latin Songs, Billboard magazine compiled a ranking of the 50 best-performing artists on the chart over the 30 years, along with the best-performing artists. Billboard has stated that "due to changes in chart methodology over the years, eras are weighted differently to account for chart turnover rates over various periods." The top was updated in 2018. It was also updated in September 2021. The latest update was published in October 2026.

Rank	Artist(s)	Ref.
1.	Bad Bunny	
2.	Enrique Iglesias	
3.	Luis Miguel	
4.	Daddy Yankee	
5.	Cristian Castro	
6.	Chayanne	
7.	Shakira	
8.	J Balvin	
9.	Marco Antonio Solís	
10.	Romeo Santos	

==== Most number-one singles ====
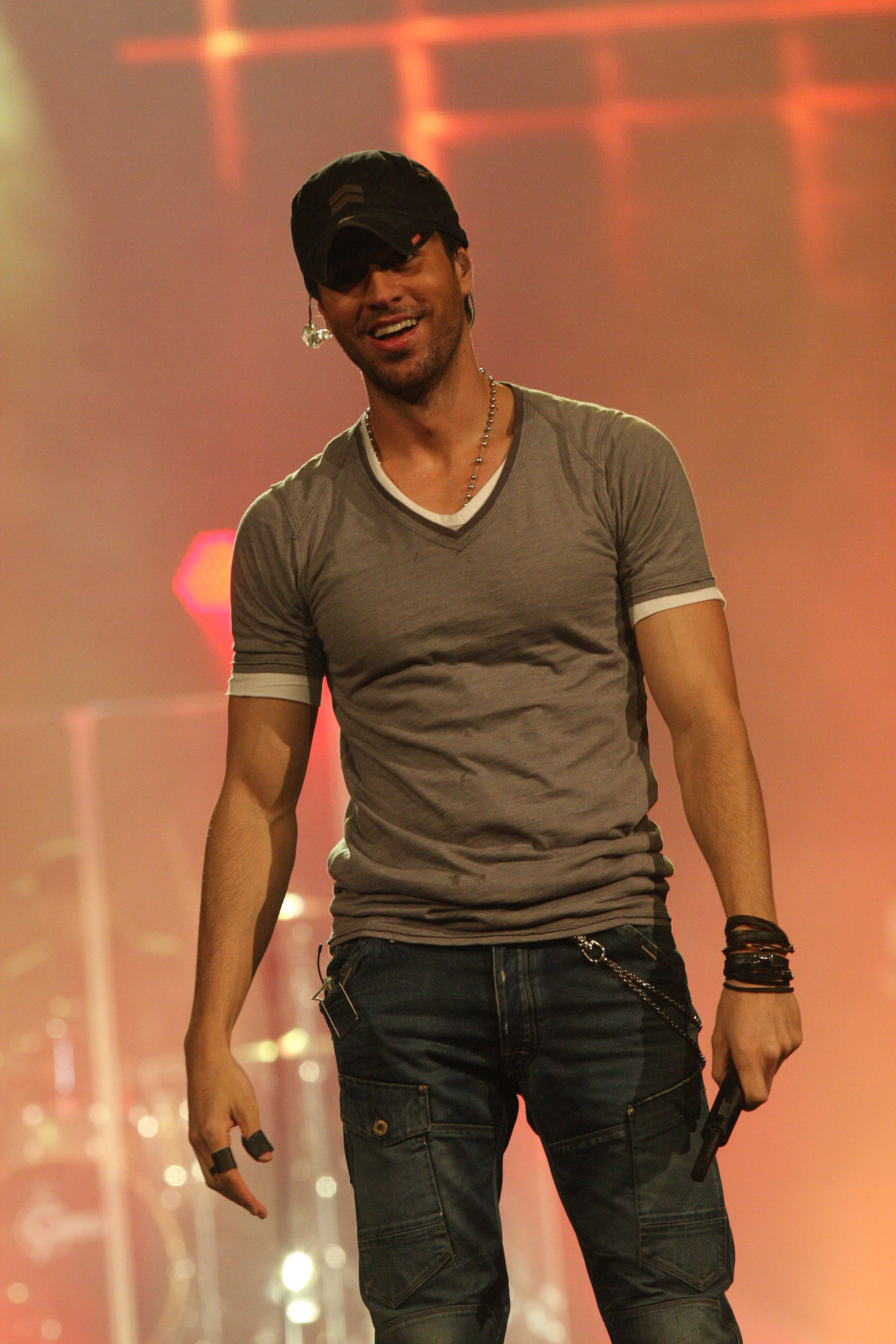
Enrique Iglesias has the most number-one songs, with 27 from 1995 to 2016.

Total	Artist	Source(s)
27	Enrique Iglesias	
17	Bad Bunny	
16	Luis Miguel	
15	Gloria Estefan	
13	Shakira	
11	Marco Antonio Solís	
11	Ricky Martin	
11	Karol G	
10	Maná	
10	Wisin & Yandel	

==== Most top 10 singles ====
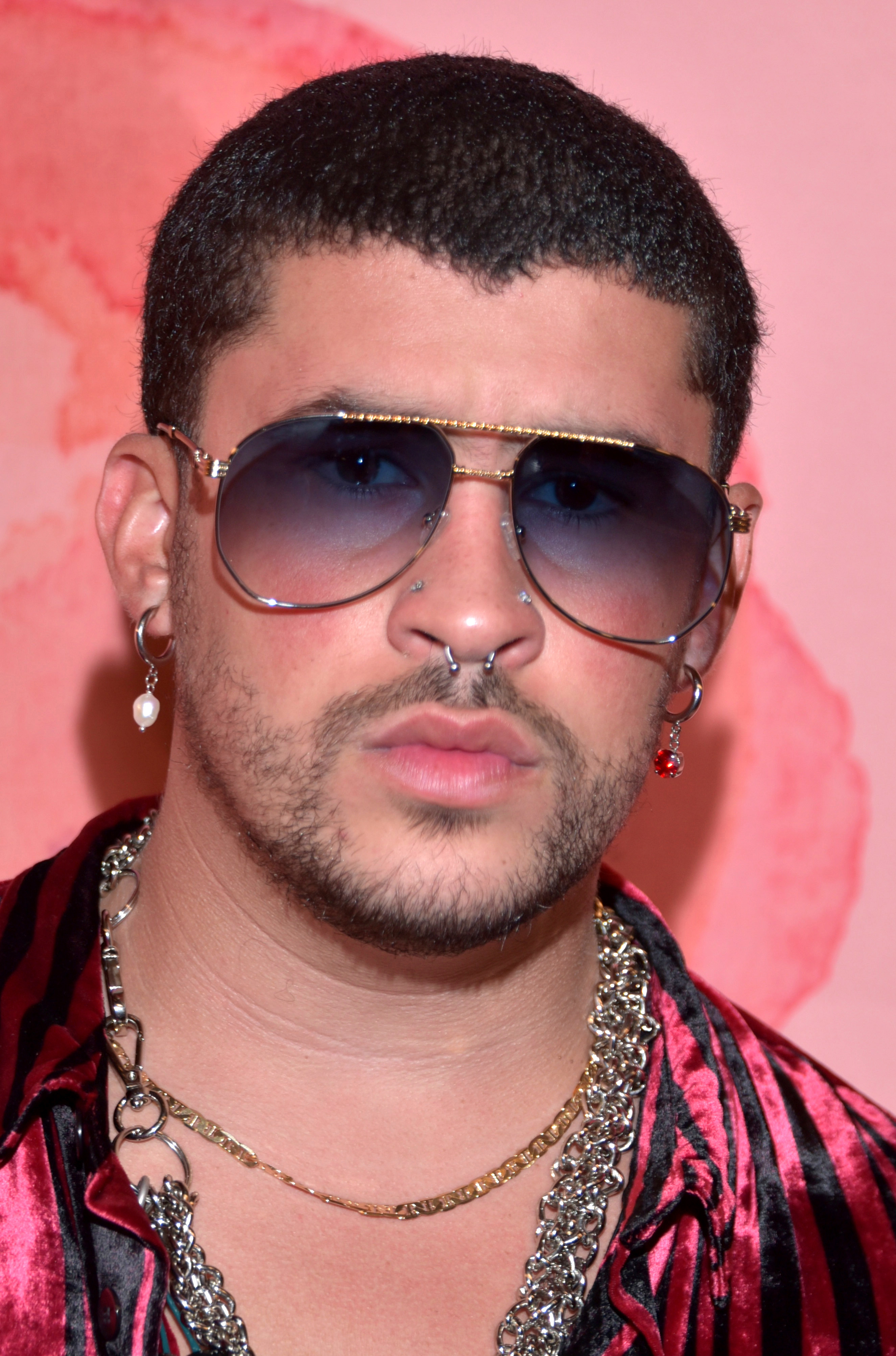
Bad Bunny has the most top 10 singles and charting singles overall, with 89 and 191, respectively, achieved between 2017 to 2025.

Total	Artist	Source
89	Bad Bunny	
39	Enrique Iglesias	
39	Luis Miguel	
38	Karol G	
37	Daddy Yankee	
37	Shakira	
36	J Balvin	
34	Peso Pluma	
29	Chayanne	
29	Cristian Castro	
29	Ozuna	

==== Most chart entries ====
Total	Artist	Source(s)
191	Bad Bunny	
126	Anuel AA	
122	Ozuna	
106	Daddy Yankee	
106	Peso Pluma	
101	Karol G	
100	J Balvin	
87	Rauw Alejandro	
87	Fuerza Regida	
69	Maluma	
67	Los Tigres del Norte	

== Year-End ==
=== Top Latin Song ===
==== Most years at number one ====
- 4 – Bad Bunny
- 3 – Ana Gabriel, Enrique Iglesias, Juan Gabriel
- 2 – Daddy Yankee, Justin Bieber, Luis Fonsi, Nicky Jam, Selena, La Mafia

==== Most years in the top 10 ====
- 12 – Enrique Iglesias
- 8 – Daddy Yankee, Bad Bunny
- 7 – Ana Gabriel, Luis Miguel, Marco Antonio Solís, Shakira
- 6 – J Balvin, Juan Gabriel, La Arrolladora Banda El Limón, Los Bukis, Marc Anthony, Ricky Martin, Romeo Santos
- 5 – Ricardo Montaner

== See also ==
- Billboard Top Latin Songs Year-End Chart
- List of Billboard Hot Latin Songs chart achievements and milestones
- Billboard Hot 100
