= Cosas del Amor =

Cosas del Amor may refer to:

- Cosas del Amor (Vikki Carr album), 1991
- Cosas del Amor (Enrique Iglesias album), 1998
- "Cosas del Amor" (song), a 1991 song performed by Vikki Carr and Ana Gabriel
- "Cosas del Amor", 2005 song by Sergio Vega
