= Cosas del Amor (song) =

1991 single by Vikki Carr and Ana Gabriel

Single by Vikki Carr and Ana Gabriel

from the album Cosas del Amor
- Released: 1991
- Genre: Latin pop
- Length: 4:16
- Label: Sony Discos
- Songwriters: Roberto Livi, Rudy Pérez
- Producer: Roberto Livi

Vikki Carr singles chronology
"Esos Hombres" (1989)	"Cosas del Amor" (1991)	"Me Estoy Volviendo Loca" (1991)

Ana Gabriel singles chronology
"Hasta Que Te Conocí" (1991)	"Cosas del Amor" (1991)	"Ahora" (1991)

"Cosas del Amor" ("Things About Love") is a song by American recording artist Vikki Carr and Mexican singer-songwriter Ana Gabriel. It was released as the lead single from Carr's studio album Cosas del Amor (1991). Written by Roberto Livi and Rudy Pérez, the song portrays the relationship between two friends and confidences between both due to marital problems of one of them.

The song became commercially successful when it reached the top of the Billboard Latin Songs chart, the first for Carr and the fifth number-one single for Gabriel. "Cosas del Amor" has been widely covered by several artists including Ana Bárbara, Milly Quezada, Jenni Rivera, Olga Tañón, and Yuri, among others. The accompanying music video portrays Carr and Gabriel discussing the situation described in the song and witnessing a solar eclipse. The track earned awards such as a Lo Nuestro for Best Pop Song and the Single of the Year mention by the Radio y Música journal.

== Background ==
"Cosas del Amor" was written by Roberto Livi and Rudy Pérez, performed by American singer Vikki Carr and included on the album of the same title, Carr's fourteenth Spanish language studio album and thirty-third overall. Carr was already a well known singer in the United States and the United Kingdom when she decided to record her first Spanish language album in 1972, Vikki Carr, En Español. Thirteen years later Carr was awarded her first Grammy Award for Simplemente Mujer, an album recorded with mariachi and produced by Pedro Ramírez. Carr recorded Cosas del Amor under the guidance of Roberto Livi in 1991, and was released a year after her duet album with Mexican singer Vicente Fernández which gave the singer her second top ten single in the Billboard Latin Songs chart with "Dos Corazones" ("Two Hearts") peaking at number ten. The first single released was recorded in a duet with Mexican singer-songwriter Ana Gabriel, who was also signed on Carr's record label Sony Music. About singing in Spanish, Carr stated: "for business I'm very American, but my heart is totally Latin."

== Chart performance and awards ==
The song debuted in the Billboard Top Latin Songs chart (formerly Hot Latin Tracks) chart at number 21 in the week of July 27, 1991, climbing to the top ten the following week. "Cosas del Amor" peaked at number-one on August 31, 1991, replacing "Todo, Todo, Todo" by Mexican singer Daniela Romo and being succeeded ten weeks later by "Por Qué Será" by Venezuelan singer-songwriter Rudy La Scala. During six consecutive weeks Ana Gabriel also held the runner-up position on the chart with "Ahora", the lead single from her studio album Mi México. "Cosas del Amor" ended 1991 as the fourth best performing Latin single of the year in the United States. The song became the fifth number-one single for Gabriel following "Ay Amor" (1988), "Simplemente Amigos" (1989), "Quién Como Tú" and "Es Demasiado Tarde" (both 1990), and the first (and to date only) for Carr.

"Cosas del Amor" earned a Lo Nuestro Award for Pop Song of the Year and was named Single of the Year by the journal Radio y Música. For the parent album Carr received a Grammy Award for Best Latin Performance and in Venezuela was awarded the "Album of the Year" (the 'Grammy' equivalent of the country). The album also peaked at number-one in Ecuador, Colombia, Costa Rica, Puerto Rico, the Billboard Latin Pop Albums in the United States, and Venezuela.

== Music video ==
The music video for "Cosas del Amor" was filmed in Cuernavaca, Morelos on July 11, 1991, and presents Carr arriving at a house where Gabriel is waiting for her. Upon entering the house, Gabriel begins to discuss the situation described in the song. The video is interspersed with scenes of both singers performing the song and some scenes where they witness a solar eclipse. The video concludes with Carr comforting Gabriel for her love situation. The video received a Billboard Music Award nomination for Latin Duo or Group Video of the Year.

== Legacy and cover versions ==
In November 1999, "Cosas del Amor" was labeled as one of the "hottest tracks" for Sony Discos in a list including the most successful songs released by the label since the launching of the Billboard Hot Latin Tracks chart in 1986. The song was also included in the compilation album Free to Be created by Jaime Ikeda and released by Right Stuff Records in order to create an all-inclusive musical collection targeting the homosexual demographic. Only four Spanish language recorded songs were added to the album: "Tres Deseos" and "Lo Que Son Las Cosas" by Ednita Nazario, "Un Amor Como el Mío" by Lunna, and "Cosas del Amor". Argentinean duo Pimpinela recorded the song for their album Pimpinela '92. Mexican singers Yuri and Ana Bárbara included their version on Yuri's self-titled album in 2004. The song was performed live for the first time by the singers at the "AcaFest2005" held in Acapulco, Mexico. José Feliciano and Rudy Pérez performed a duet on Feliciano's album, José Feliciano y Amigos.

Puerto-Rican American singer Olga Tañón recorded a cover version of the track on Éxitos en 2 Tiempos (2007), the first album by Tañon to include covers of songs previously recorded by other artists. The song was performed in a duet with Dominican singer Milly Quezada for the pop version and with American singer Jenni Rivera for the Regional/Mexican version, and upon released as a single peaked at number 40 in the Billboard Latin Songs and at number 20 in the Latin Pop Songs chart, respectively. This version was nominated for Tropical Airplay Song of the Year, Female at the 2009 Latin Billboard Music Awards. which was ultimately won by Ivy Queen and "Dime". Margarita Vargas "La Diosa de la Cumbia" ("The Goddess of Cumbia") joined Mariana Seoane on a recording of "Cosas del Amor" included on Seoane's fourth studio album Está de Fiesta... Atrévete!!! (2007). Mexican singers María José and Edith Márquez recorded "Cosas del Amor" for José's studio album Amante de lo Ajeno in 2009. Carr was awarded the Latin Recording Academy Lifetime Achievement Award at the 9th Latin Grammy Awards in 2008. Carr attended the ceremony and performed "Cosas del Amor" with Olga Tañón and Jenni Rivera, in a presentation described as "boring" by Carlos Reyes of the magazine Club Fonograma. In 2020, Mexican singer-songwriter Ximena Sariñana was joined by Spanish actress Paz Vega to record a cover version of the song for the third season of the Mexican web series La Casa de las Flores. About the recording, Sariñana said: "It is a very emblematic song, but also the situation in which it is placed in the series and how Manolo Caro worked it, became a great musical moment, and it was super fun to perform the song with Paz Vega, we had a great time that day." In 2023, the song was included in a mashup with "Vuelve", and was performed by Isabella Castillo and Valentina in the film La Usurpadora: El Musical.

== See also ==
- Billboard Top Latin Songs Year-End Chart
- List of number-one Billboard Latin Songs from the 90's
