= Emociones =

Emociones may refer to:

- Emociones (Vikki Carr album), 1996
- Emociones (Julio Iglesias album), 1979
