= The Lesson (song) =

"The Lesson" is the song written by Mack David and recorded by Vikki Carr in 1967 and was released as a single as the follow-up to Carr's hit song "It Must Be Him". Like the previous single, "The Lesson" reached the top of the Easy Listening chart, spending one week at number one in February 1968. On the Billboard Hot 100, it peaked at number thirty-four. It reached number 44 in Australia.

== See also ==
- List of number-one adult contemporary singles of 1968 (U.S.)
