= List of Billboard Easy Listening number ones of 1968 =

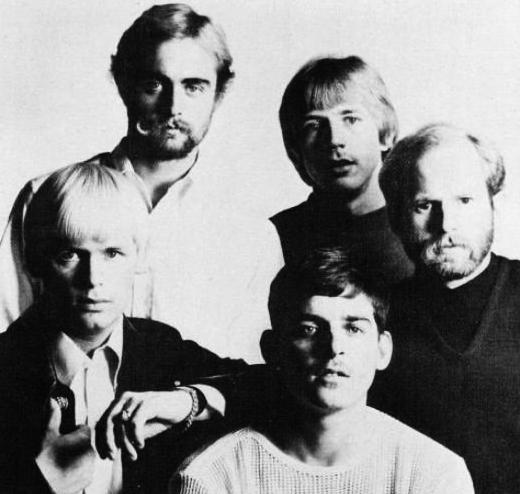
Harpers Bizarre began the year at number one with their version of the 1941 song "Chattanooga Choo Choo".

In 1968, Billboard magazine published a chart ranking the top-performing songs in the United States in the easy listening market. The chart, which in 1968 was entitled Easy Listening, has undergone various name changes and since 1996 has been published under the title Adult Contemporary. In 1968, 13 songs topped the chart based on playlists submitted by easy listening radio stations and sales reports submitted by stores.

In the issue of Billboard dated January 6, the number one spot was held by Harpers Bizarre with their version of Glenn Miller's 1941 song "Chattanooga Choo Choo", which climbed from number 3 the previous week. It would prove to be the only time that the sunshine pop band topped the Easy Listening chart, and after 1968 they would achieve no further entries on the listing at all. Other acts to top the Easy Listening chart for the first time in 1968 included the Brazilian bandleader Sérgio Mendes, who achieved the feat with a version of "The Fool on the Hill", originally recorded by the Beatles. After a lengthy period without further major success, Mendes would achieve a second number one 15 years after the first when he made a comeback in 1983 and took his version of "Never Gonna Let You Go" to the top spot.

The longest-running number one of 1968 was the French orchestra leader Paul Mauriat's instrumental version of a song which had originally been Luxembourg's entry to the 1967 Eurovision Song Contest, "Love is Blue". Mauriat's recording spent 11 consecutive weeks in the top spot, setting a new record for the longest run at number one on the chart which would stand for 25 years until Billy Joel spent 12 weeks in the peak position with "The River of Dreams" in 1993. "Love is Blue" also topped Billboard's pop chart, the Hot 100, although it would prove to be Mauriat's only number one on either listing. "Honey" by Bobby Goldsboro and "This Guy's In Love With You" by Herb Alpert also topped both charts in 1968. The final Easy Listening number one of the year was "Wichita Lineman" by Glen Campbell, the first time he topped the listing; after achieving his first three Easy Listening number ones within a 12-month period he would not return to the top of the chart until "Rhinestone Cowboy" reached number one in 1975.

== Chart history ==
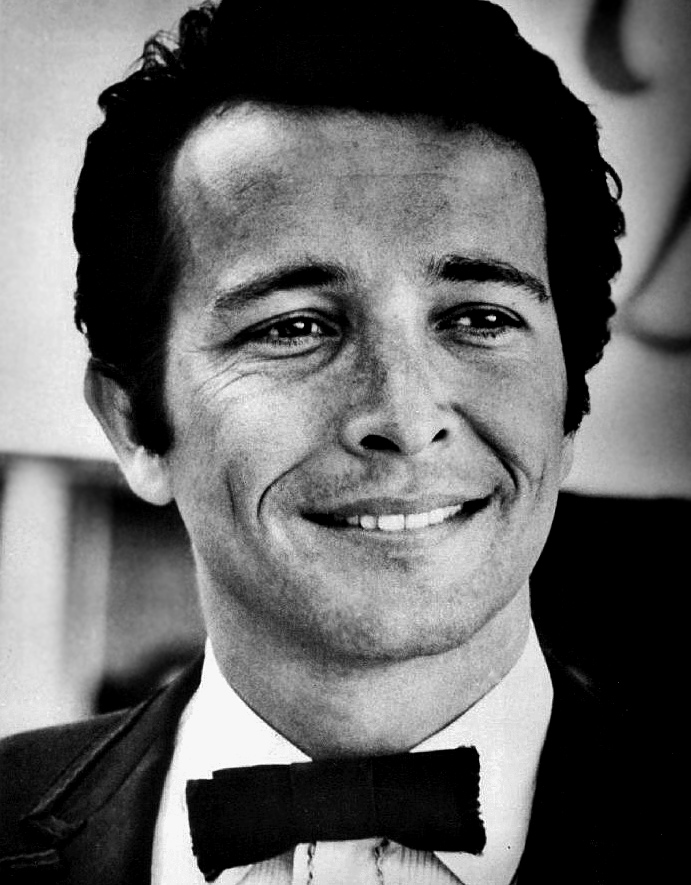
"This Guy's in Love with You" was a long-running number one for Herb Alpert.

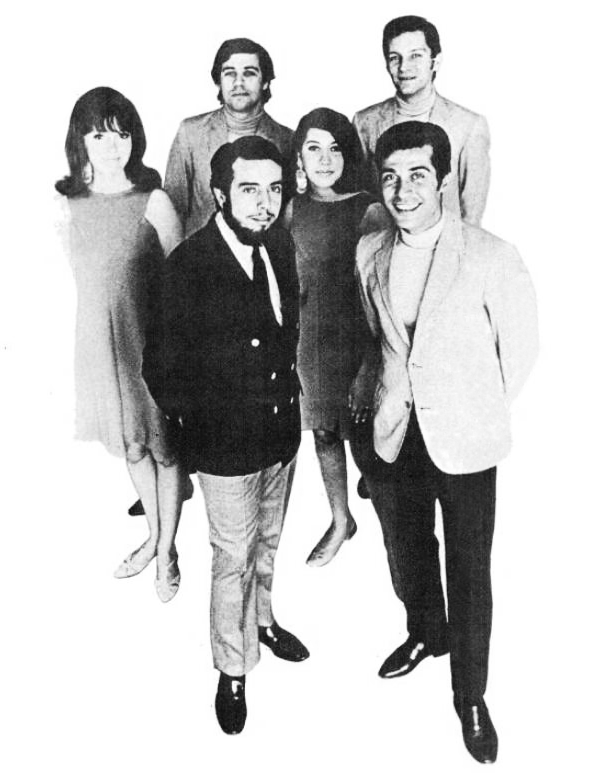
Sérgio Mendes & Brasil '66 topped the chart with their version of "The Fool on the Hill", originally recorded by the Beatles.

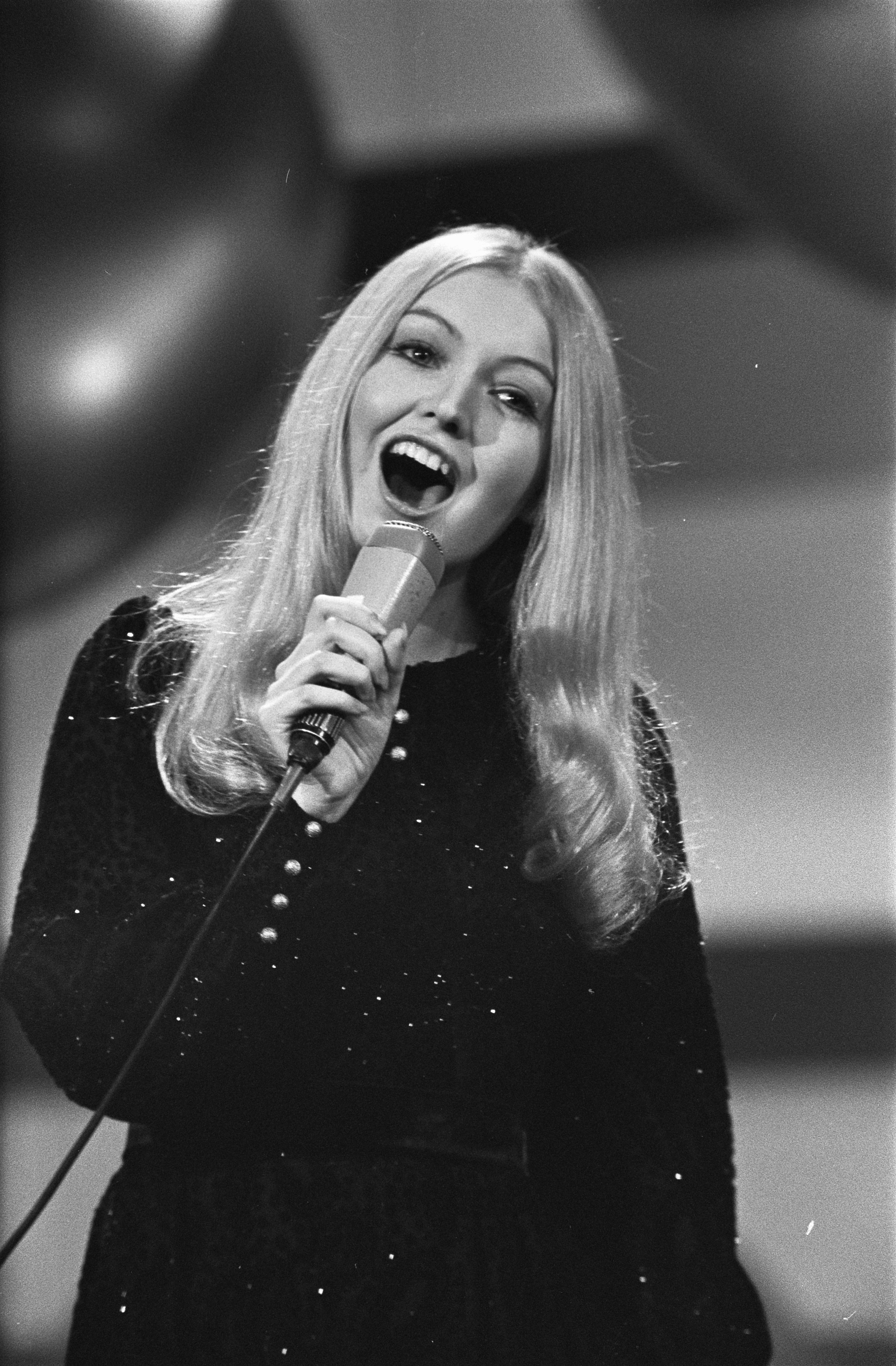
Mary Hopkin spent six weeks at number one with "Those Were the Days".

Chart history
Issue date	Title	Artist(s)	Ref.
January 6	"Chattanooga Choo Choo"	Harpers Bizarre	
January 13	"Chattanooga Choo Choo"	Harpers Bizarre	
January 20	"In the Misty Moonlight"	Dean Martin	
January 27	"In the Misty Moonlight"	Dean Martin	
February 3	"Am I That Easy to Forget"	Engelbert Humperdinck	
February 10	"The Lesson"	Vikki Carr	
February 17	"Love Is Blue"	Paul Mauriat	
February 24	"Love Is Blue"	Paul Mauriat	
March 2	"Love Is Blue"	Paul Mauriat	
March 9	"Love Is Blue"	Paul Mauriat	
March 16	"Love Is Blue"	Paul Mauriat	
March 23	"Love Is Blue"	Paul Mauriat	
March 30	"Love Is Blue"	Paul Mauriat	
April 6	"Love Is Blue"	Paul Mauriat	
April 13	"Love Is Blue"	Paul Mauriat	
April 20	"Love Is Blue"	Paul Mauriat	
April 27	"Love Is Blue"	Paul Mauriat	
May 4	"Honey"	Bobby Goldsboro	
May 11	"Honey"	Bobby Goldsboro	
May 18	"The Good, the Bad and the Ugly"	Hugo Montenegro	
May 25	"The Good, the Bad and the Ugly"	Hugo Montenegro	
June 1	"The Good, the Bad and the Ugly"	Hugo Montenegro	
June 8	"This Guy's in Love with You"	Herb Alpert	
June 15	"This Guy's in Love with You"	Herb Alpert	
June 22	"This Guy's in Love with You"	Herb Alpert	
June 29	"This Guy's in Love with You"	Herb Alpert	
July 6	"This Guy's in Love with You"	Herb Alpert	
July 13	"This Guy's in Love with You"	Herb Alpert	
July 20	"This Guy's in Love with You"	Herb Alpert	
July 27	"This Guy's in Love with You"	Herb Alpert	
August 3	"This Guy's in Love with You"	Herb Alpert	
August 10	"This Guy's in Love with You"	Herb Alpert	
August 17	"Classical Gas"	Mason Williams	
August 24	"Classical Gas"	Mason Williams	
August 31	"Classical Gas"	Mason Williams	
September 7	"The Fool on the Hill"	Sérgio Mendes & Brasil '66	
September 14	"The Fool on the Hill"	Sérgio Mendes & Brasil '66	
September 21	"The Fool on the Hill"	Sérgio Mendes & Brasil '66	
September 28	"The Fool on the Hill"	Sérgio Mendes & Brasil '66	
October 5	"The Fool on the Hill"	Sérgio Mendes & Brasil '66	
October 12	"The Fool on the Hill"	Sérgio Mendes & Brasil '66	
October 19	"My Special Angel"	The Vogues	
October 26	"My Special Angel"	The Vogues	
November 2	"Those Were the Days"	Mary Hopkin	
November 9	"Those Were the Days"	Mary Hopkin	
November 16	"Those Were the Days"	Mary Hopkin	
November 23	"Those Were the Days"	Mary Hopkin	
November 30	"Those Were the Days"	Mary Hopkin	
December 7	"Those Were the Days"	Mary Hopkin	
December 14	"Wichita Lineman"	Glen Campbell	
December 21	"Wichita Lineman"	Glen Campbell	
December 28	"Wichita Lineman"	Glen Campbell	
