= Alex Cuba (album) =

Studio album by Alex Cuba
- Released: October 27, 2009 (Canada); June 8, 2010 (US)
- Genre: Latin pop
- Length: 43:33
- Label: Caracol Records

Alex Cuba chronology
Agua Del Pozo (2007)	Alex Cuba (2009)

Alex Cuba is the third studio album released by Cuban-Canadian singer-songwriter Alex Cuba. It was released in Canada in 2009, and in the US in 2010. The album was nominated for a Latin Grammy in 2010, for Best Male Pop Vocal Album. In 2011, it was nominated for a Grammy Award for Best Latin Pop Album.

== Reception ==
NPR wrote that the album, in contrast to his previous work, "finds Cuba sounding less moody than usual, and appropriately surrounded by funky and lighthearted music." Billboard called the track "Solo Tu" a highlight, referring to it as a "pop anthem". The Toronto Star wrote that he is "deftly mixing his Cuban son roots with good, old-fashioned 1970s pop and light rock."

== Track listing ==
This information adapted from Allmusic.

No.	Title	Writer(s)	Length
1.	"Directo"	Cuba	3:48
2.	"Caballo"	Cuba	3:31
3.	"Ella"	Cuba	3:20
4.	"If You Give Me Love"	Baker, Cuba	3:39
5.	"Que Pasa Lola"	Cuba	2:56
6.	"Gira"	Cuba	3:51
7.	"En El Cielo"	Cuba	2:54
8.	"Tierra Colora"	Cuba	2:29
9.	"Solo Tu"	Cuba	3:36
10.	"Hoy Para Siempre"	Cuba, Martinez	3:20
11.	"Como Amigos"	Cuba	3:23
12.	"Amar"	Cuba, Velasquez	3:40
13.	"Contradicciones"	Cuba	3:06

== Personnel ==
- Alexander Abreu – flugelhorn, trumpet
- Joby Baker – drums, engineer, mastering, mixing, producer, shaker, tambourine, backing vocals, wurlitzer
- Joaquin Betancourt – horn arrangements
- Alex Cuba – bass, cowbell, guitar, horn arrangements, primary artist, producer, shaker, vocals
- Emilio Del Monte Jr. – congas
- Emilio Del Monte – maracas
- Jose Luis Hernandez – tenor sax
- Andres Mendoza – management
- Sarah Puentes – English translations
- Amaury Perez Rodriguez – trombone
- Vincent Toi – design
- Jose-Raul Varonay – engineer
- Christina Woerns – photography
