= Mendó =

2021 album by Alex Cuba

Studio album by Alex Cuba
- Released: 2021
- Label: Caracol Records

Alex Cuba chronology
Sublime (2019)	Mendó (2021)	El Swing Que Yo Tengo (2023)

Mendó is a Grammy Award winning album under the category Best Latin Pop Album by Alex Cuba.
