= Grammy Award for Best Latin Pop Album =

Award presented at the Grammy Awards since 1984

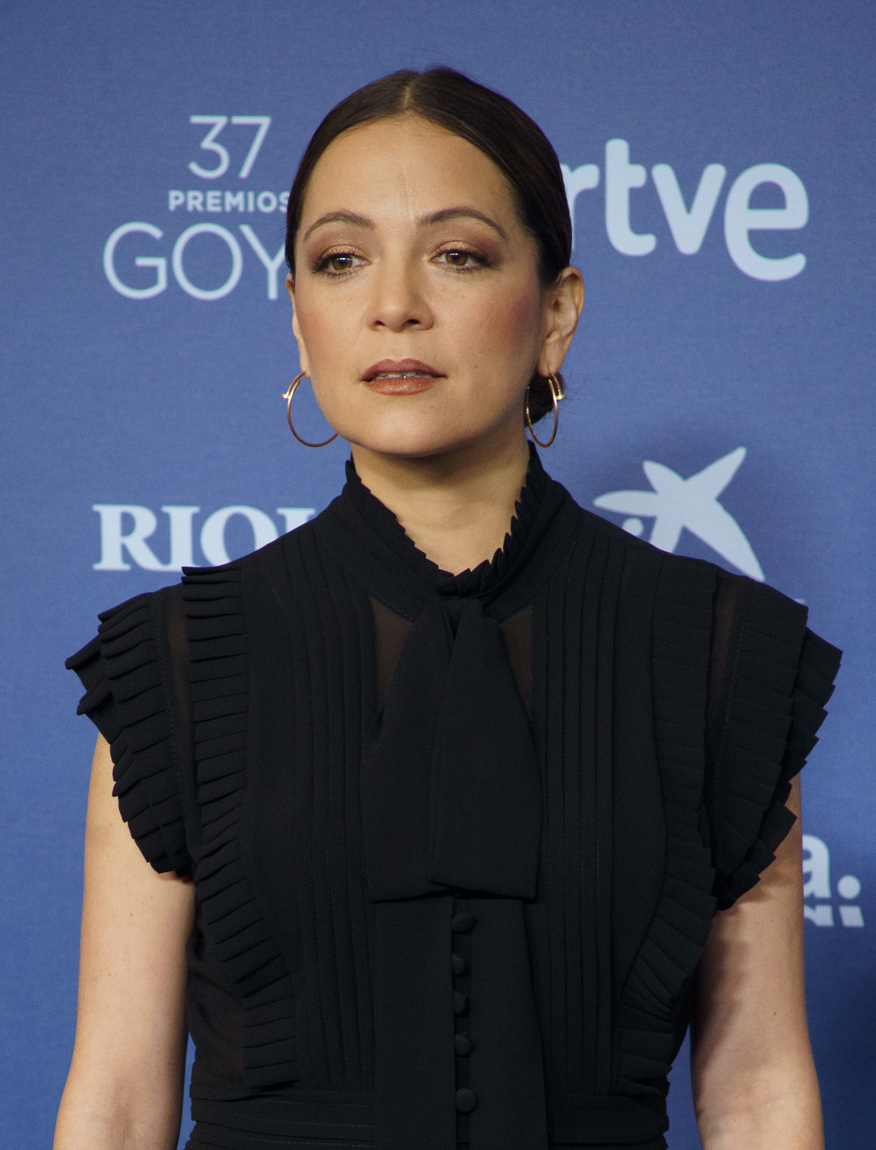
- Cancionera by Natalia Lafourcade is the most recent recipient
- Awarded for: quality vocal or instrumental Latin pop
- Country: United States
- Presented by: National Academy of Recording Arts and Sciences
- First award: 1984
- Currently held by: Natalia Lafourcade – Cancionera (2026)
- Website: grammy.com

The Grammy Award for Best Latin Pop Album is an award presented at the Grammy Awards, a ceremony that was established in 1958 and originally called the Gramophone Awards, to recording artists for releasing albums in the Latin pop genre. Honors in several categories are presented at the ceremony annually by the National Academy of Recording Arts and Sciences of the United States to "honor artistic achievement, technical proficiency and overall excellence in the recording industry, without regard to album sales or chart position".

Throughout its history, this award has had minor name changes: "Best Latin Pop Performance" (1984–1991, 1995–2000), "Best Latin Pop or Urban Album" (1992–1994, 2021) and "Best Latin Pop Album" since 2022. In 2012 the award was not presented due to a major overhaul of Grammy categories. That year recordings in this category were shifted to the newly formed "Best Latin Pop, Rock or Urban Album". However, later that year, the Board of Trustees announced that it would be bringing back the category for the 55th Grammy Awards in 2013 with the following description: "for albums containing at least 51 percent playing time of new vocal or instrumental Latin pop recordings". In June 2020, the Recording Academy decided to move the Latin urban genre from the Best Latin Rock, Alternative or Urban Album category to this category, as "the Latin urban genre, both aesthetically and musically, is much more closely related to the current state of Latin pop." However, from 2022, Latin urban music has been honored with its own separate category: Best Música Urbana Album.

From 1984 to 1991, the category allowed single tracks or albums, and as of 1992 only includes albums. Beginning in 1998, members of the Latin Academy of Recording Arts & Sciences (LARAS) are eligible to vote in the Latin field of the Grammy Award categories. Puerto Rican singer José Feliciano was the first awarded in the category for his album Me Enamoré (1984). Feliciano and Spanish singer Alejandro Sanz are the biggest winners with four accolades each. The most nominated performer is Mexican singer Luis Miguel with twelve nominations that resulted in three wins, including his consecutive awards for Aries (1994) and Segundo Romance (1995). In 1998, Spanish artists Enrique Iglesias and Julio Iglesias, father and son, where nominated against each other for their albums Vivir and Tango, respectively, losing both to Miguel's Romances. Guatemalan singer-songwriter Ricardo Arjona and Mexican musician Julieta Venegas tied in 2007 for their albums Adentro and Limón y Sal, respectively.

Panamanian artist Rubén Blades has received the award three times, in 2000, 2015 and 2023, and also has been recognized in other fields, with winning albums for Tropical Latin Album and World Music Album. Laura Pausini became the first Italian female artist to win a Grammy Award with the album Escucha in 2006. No Es lo Mismo by Sanz, La Vida... Es un Ratico and MTV Unplugged by Colombian artist Juanes, and Vida by Puerto Rican singer-songwriter Draco Rosa won the Grammy Award for Best Latin Pop Album and also received the Latin Grammy Award for Album of the Year. Shakira became the first female performer to receive the honor three times, with her winning albums MTV Unplugged (2001), El Dorado (2018) and Las Mujeres Ya No Lloran (2025). As of 2025, Mexican singer José José is the most nominated performer without a win with six unsuccessful nominations.

== Winners and nominees ==
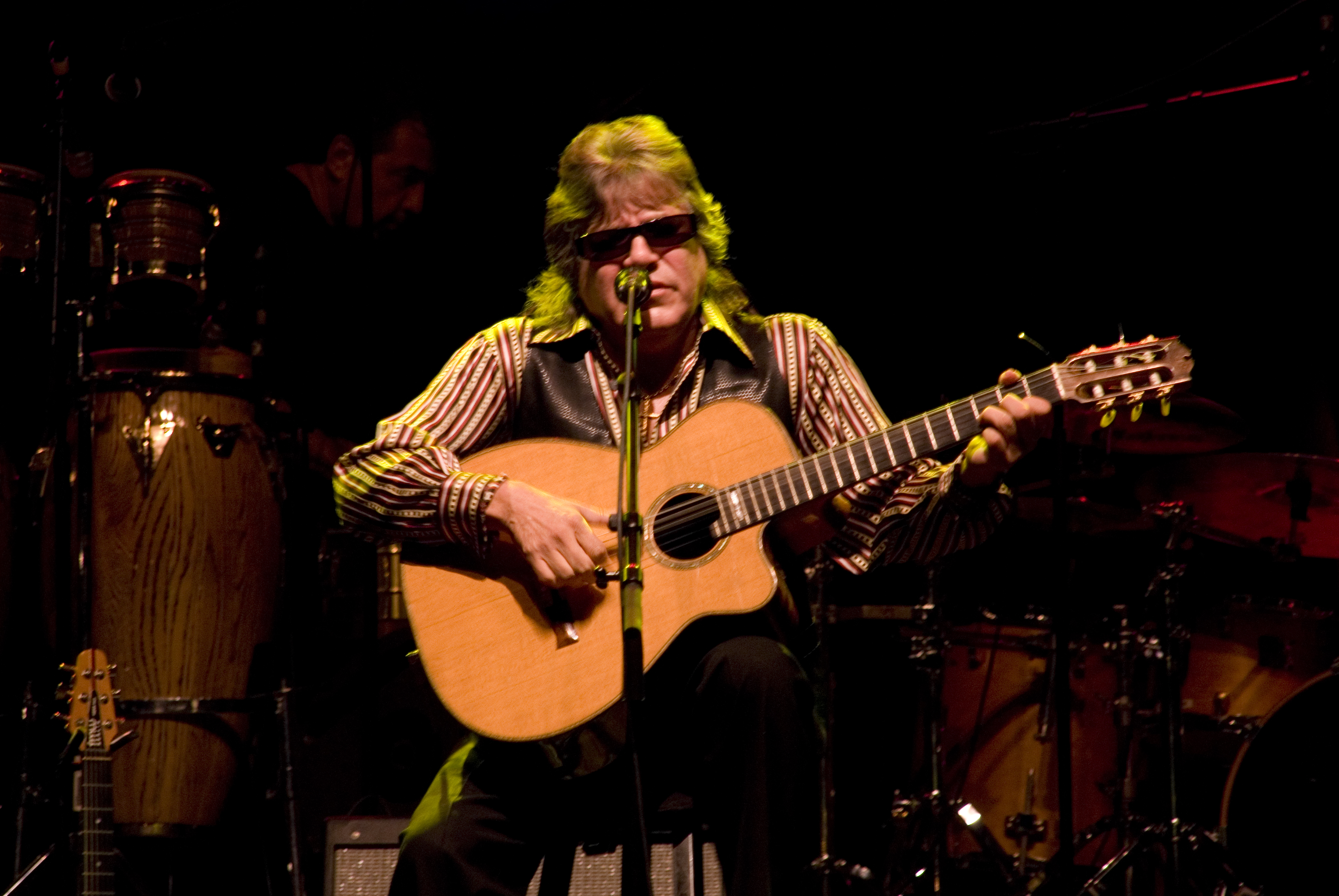
Puerto Rican singer José Feliciano, the most awarded performer with four wins.

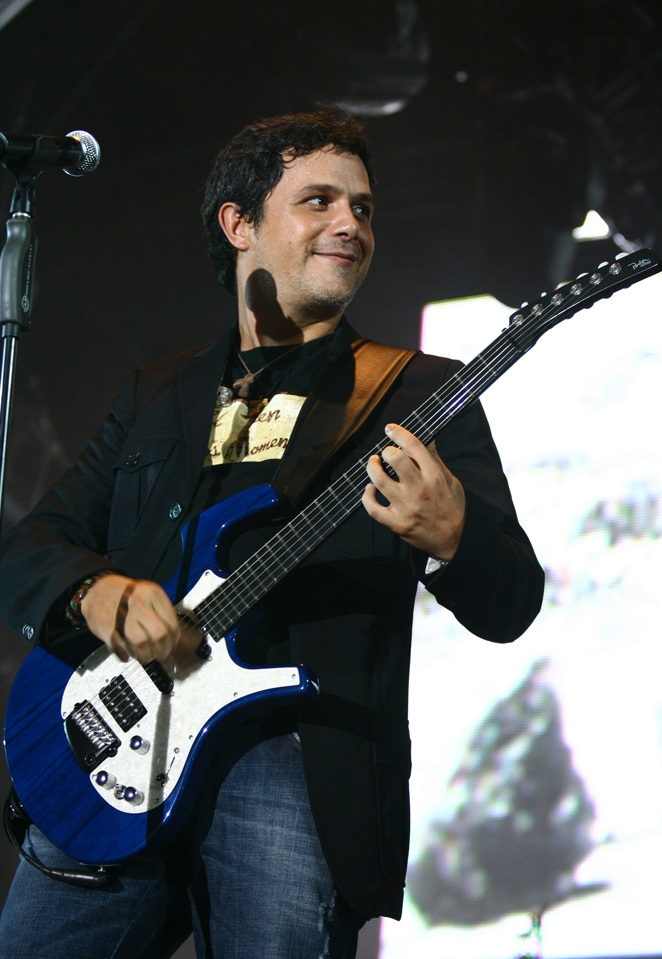
Four-time winner, Spanish artist Alejandro Sanz

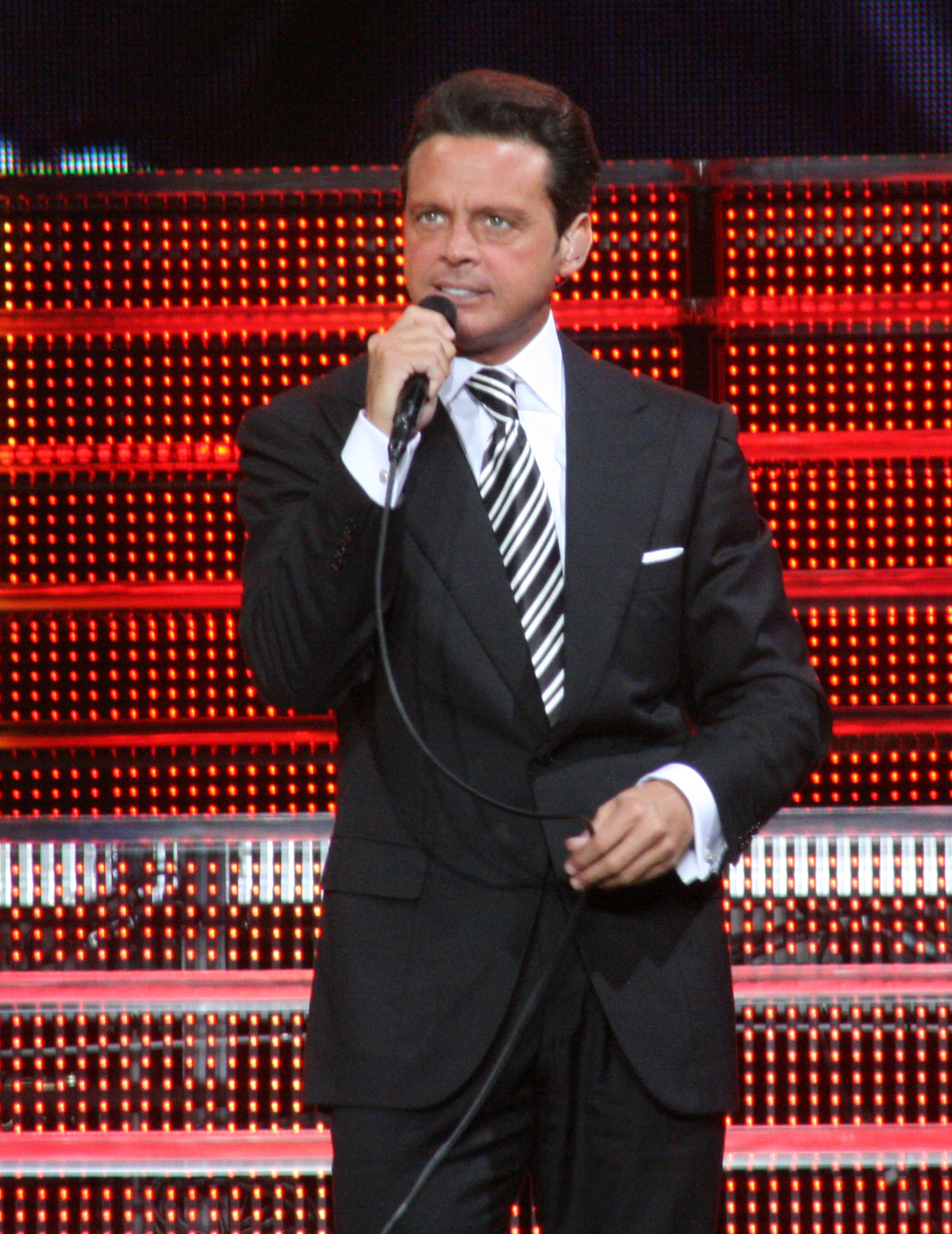
Three-time winner, Mexican performer Luis Miguel

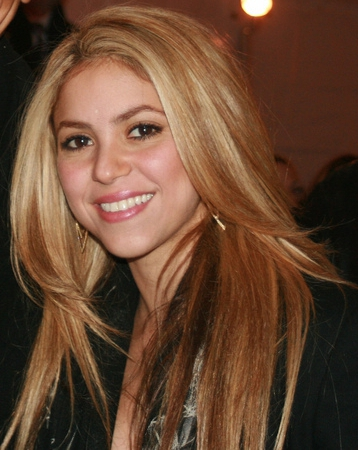
First female performer to win three times, Colombian singer-songwriter Shakira, winner in 2001, 2018 and 2025.

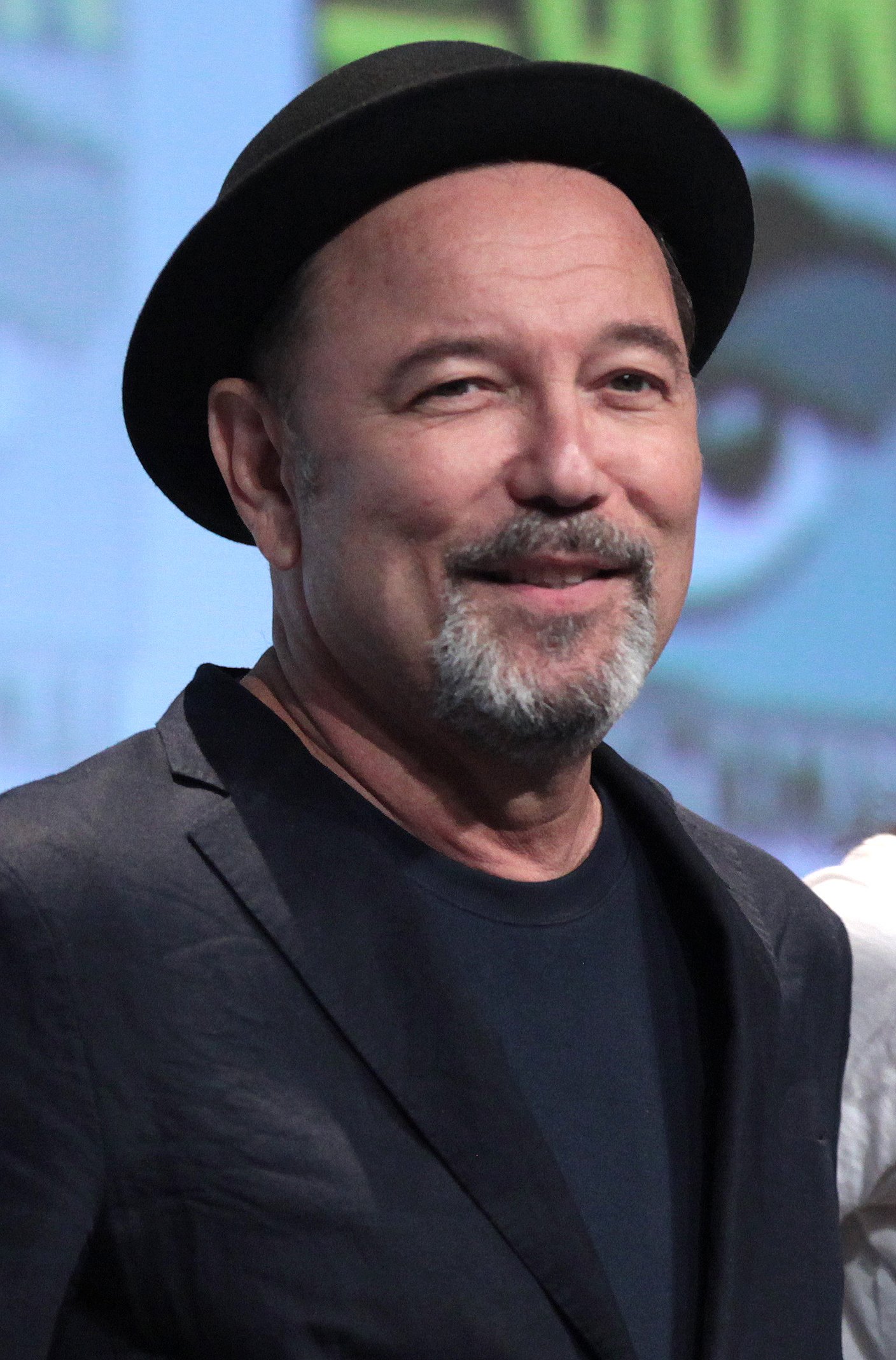
Three-time winner, Panamanian singer-songwriter Rubén Blades

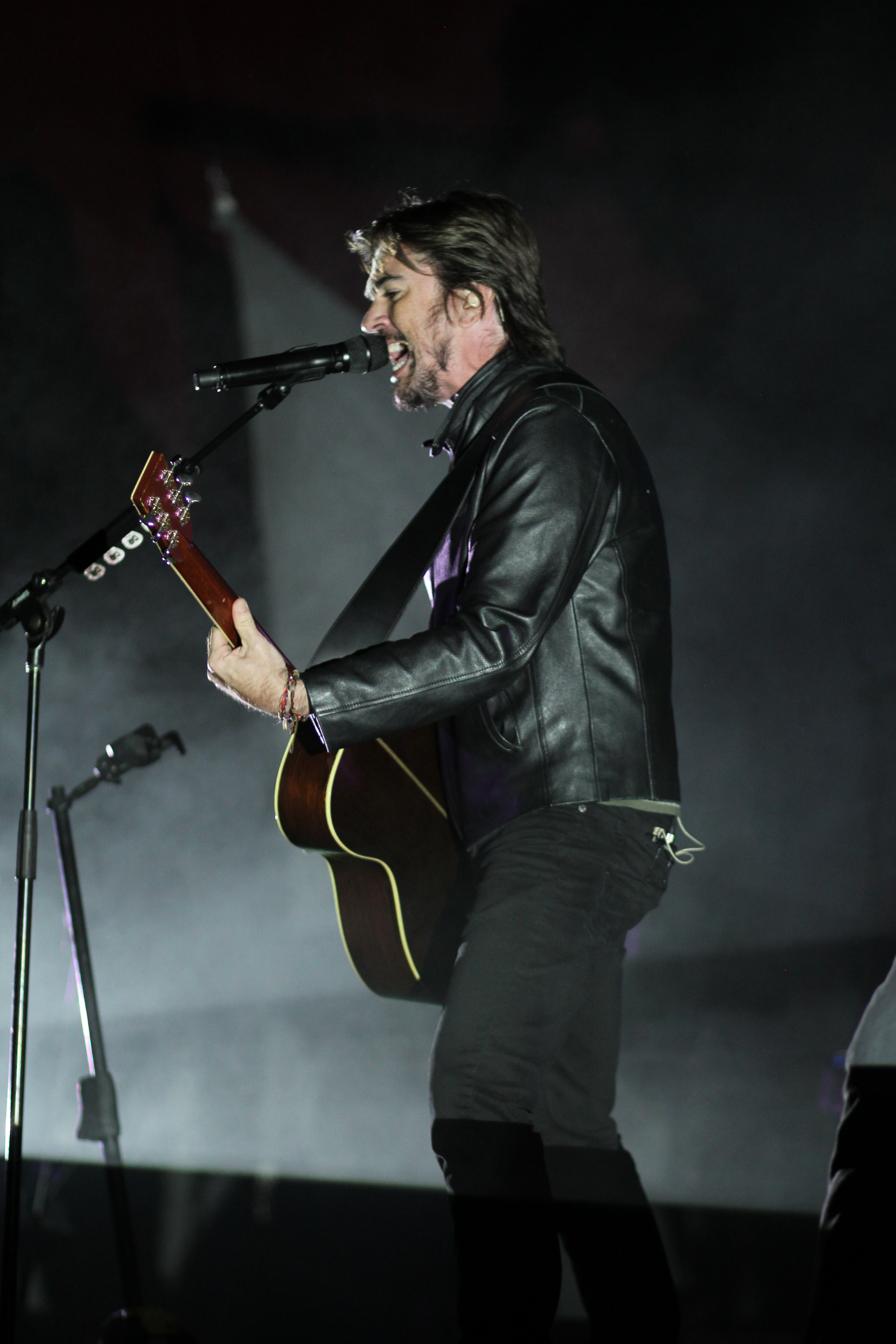
Two-time winner, Colombian artist Juanes

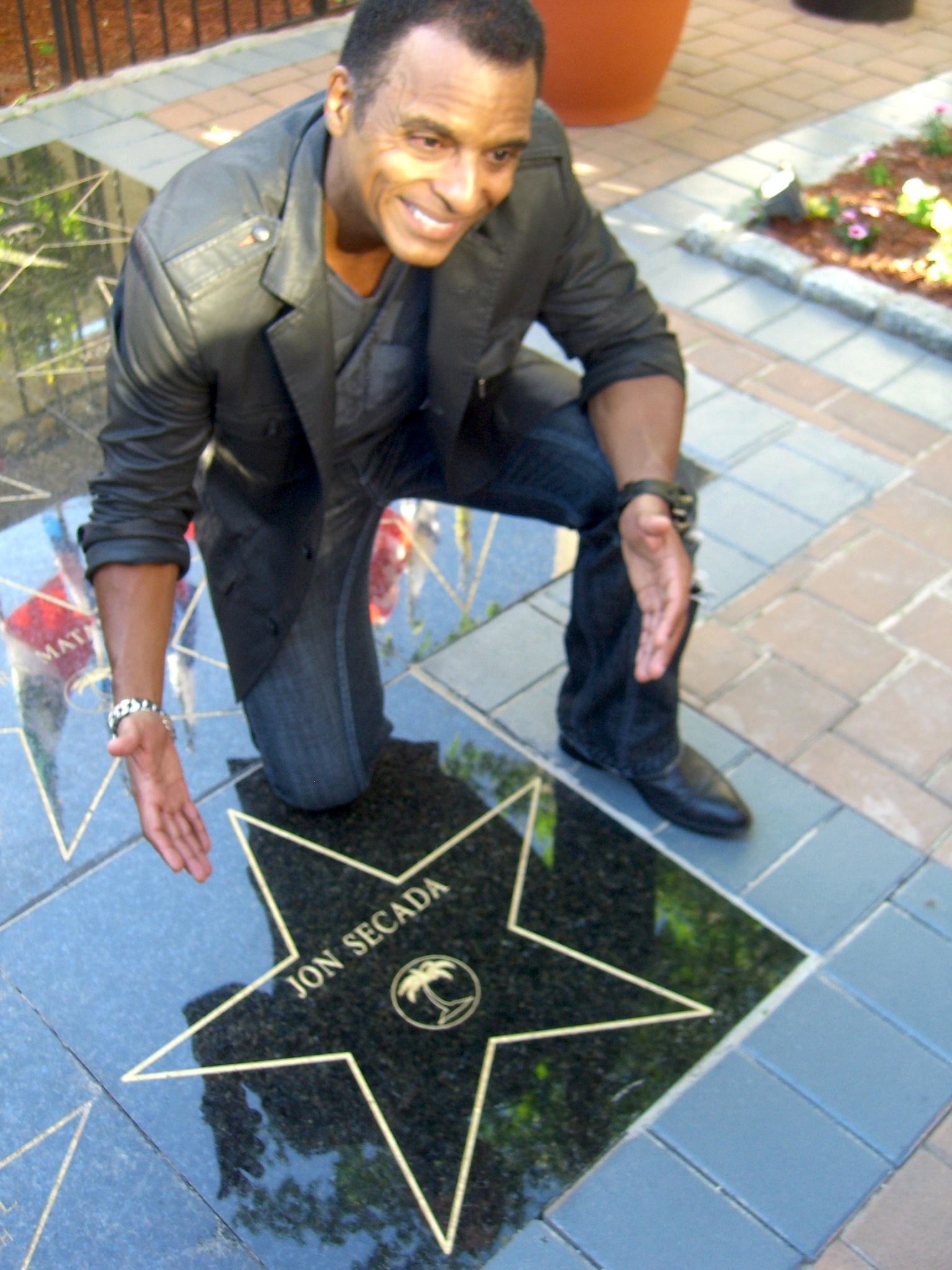
Cuban-American singer Jon Secada, winner in 1993 and 1996.

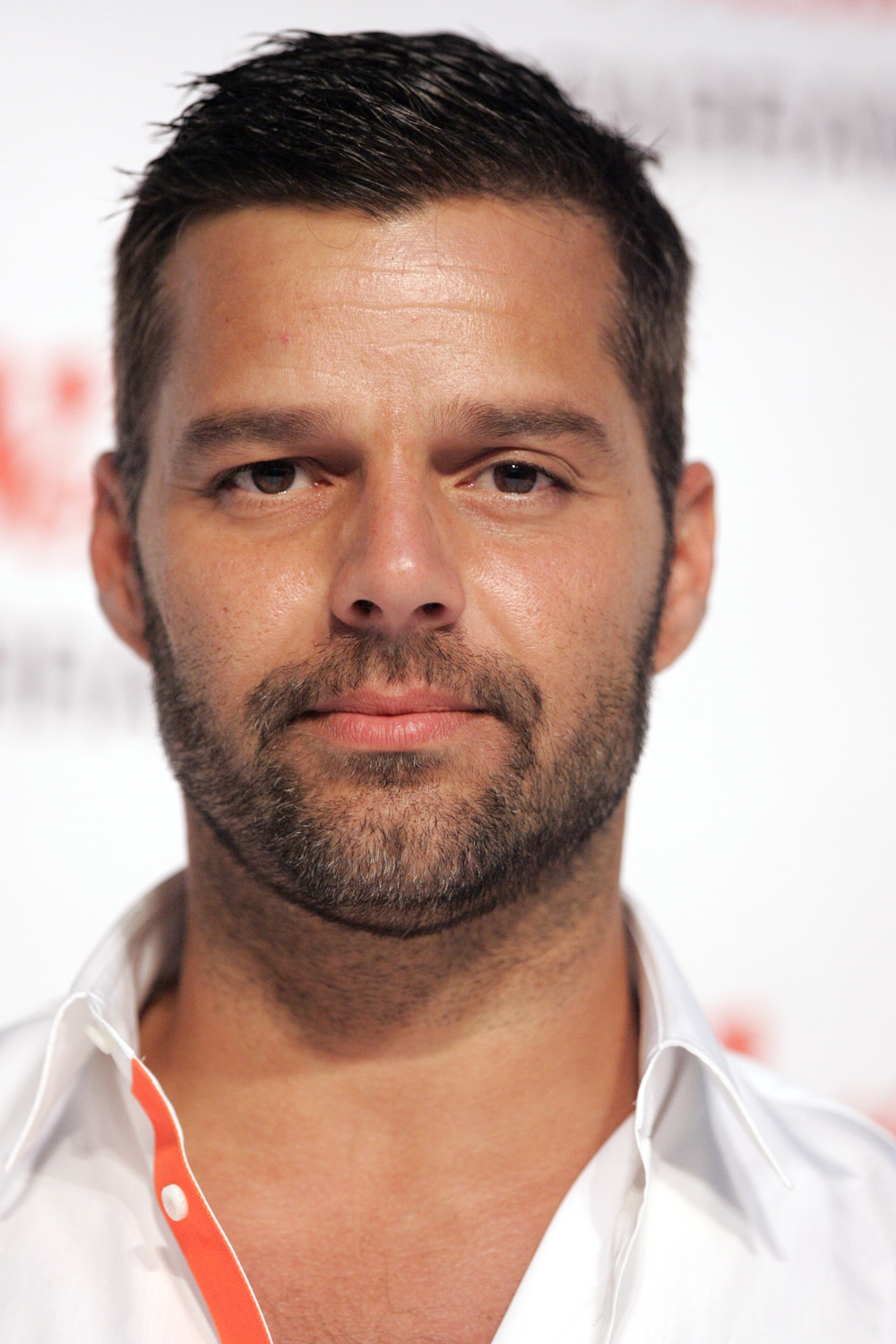
Two-time winner, Puerto Rican artist Ricky Martin, winner in 1999 and 2016.

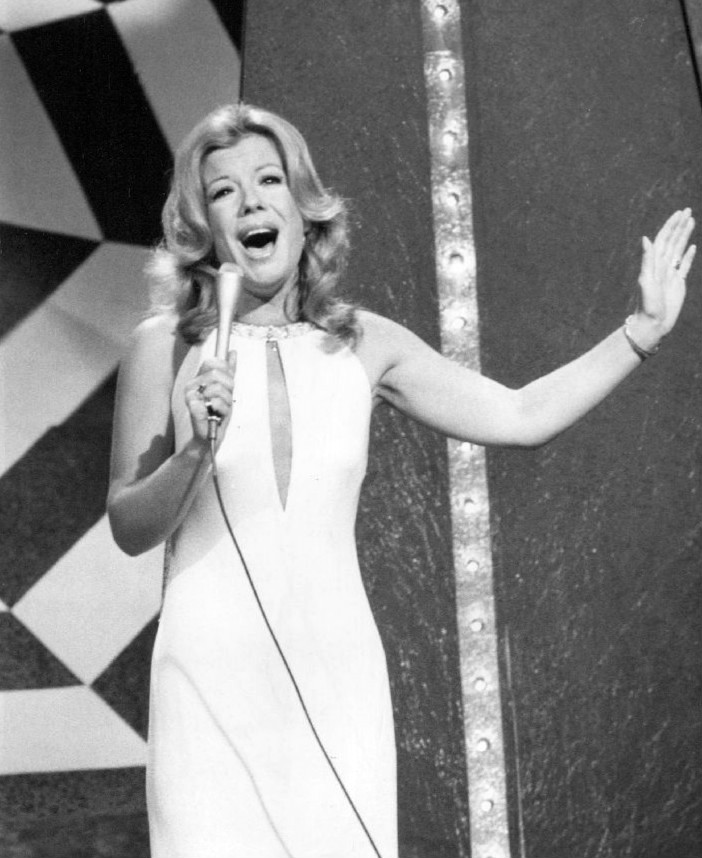
American artist Vikki Carr, winner in 1992.

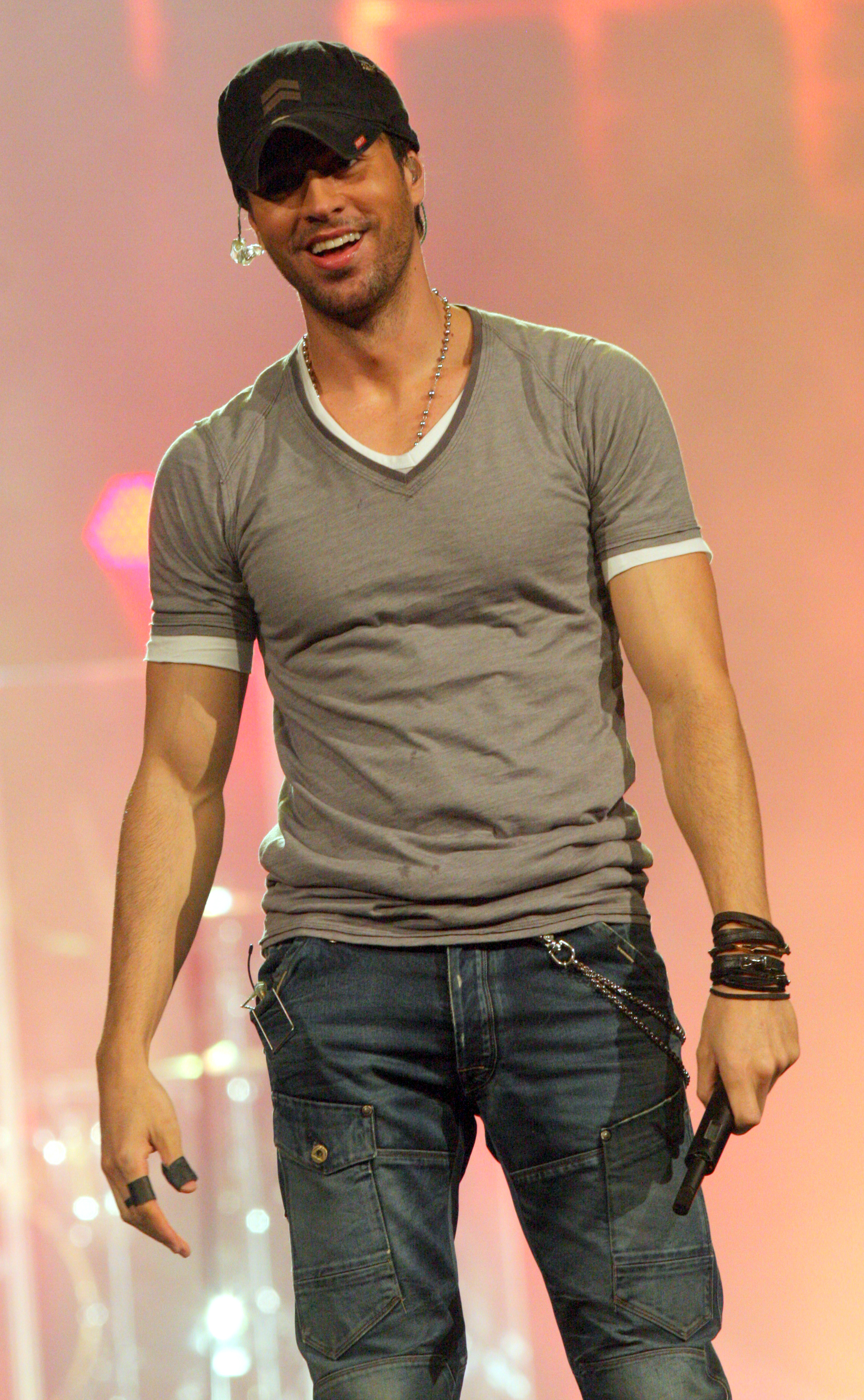
Spanish singer Enrique Iglesias, winner in 1997

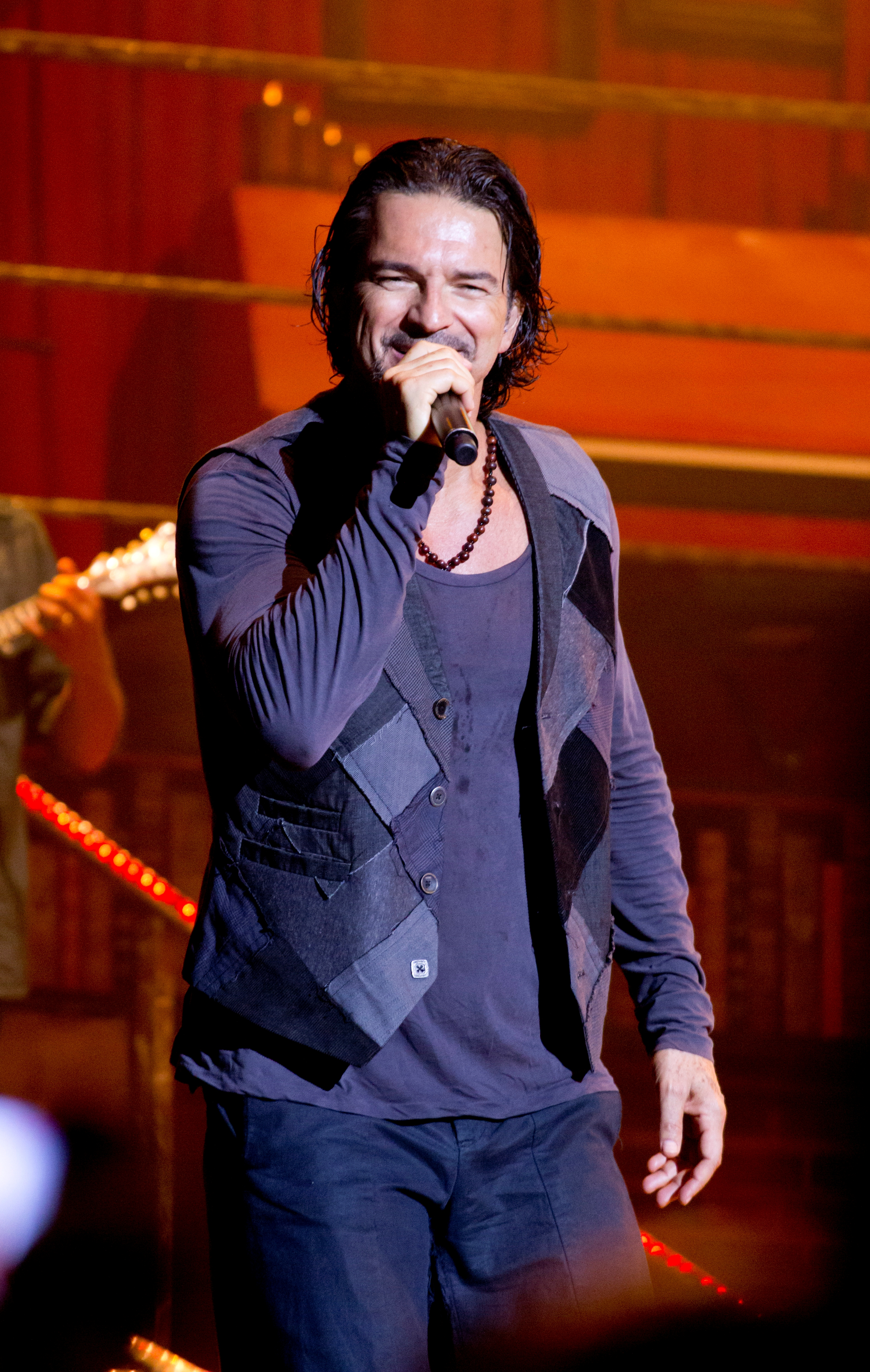
Guatemalan singer-songwriter Ricardo Arjona, winner in 2007

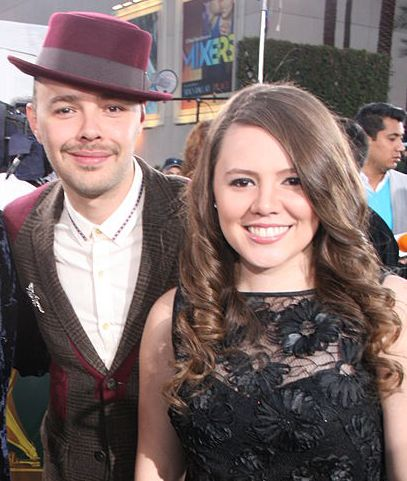
Mexican duo Jesse & Joy, winner in 2017

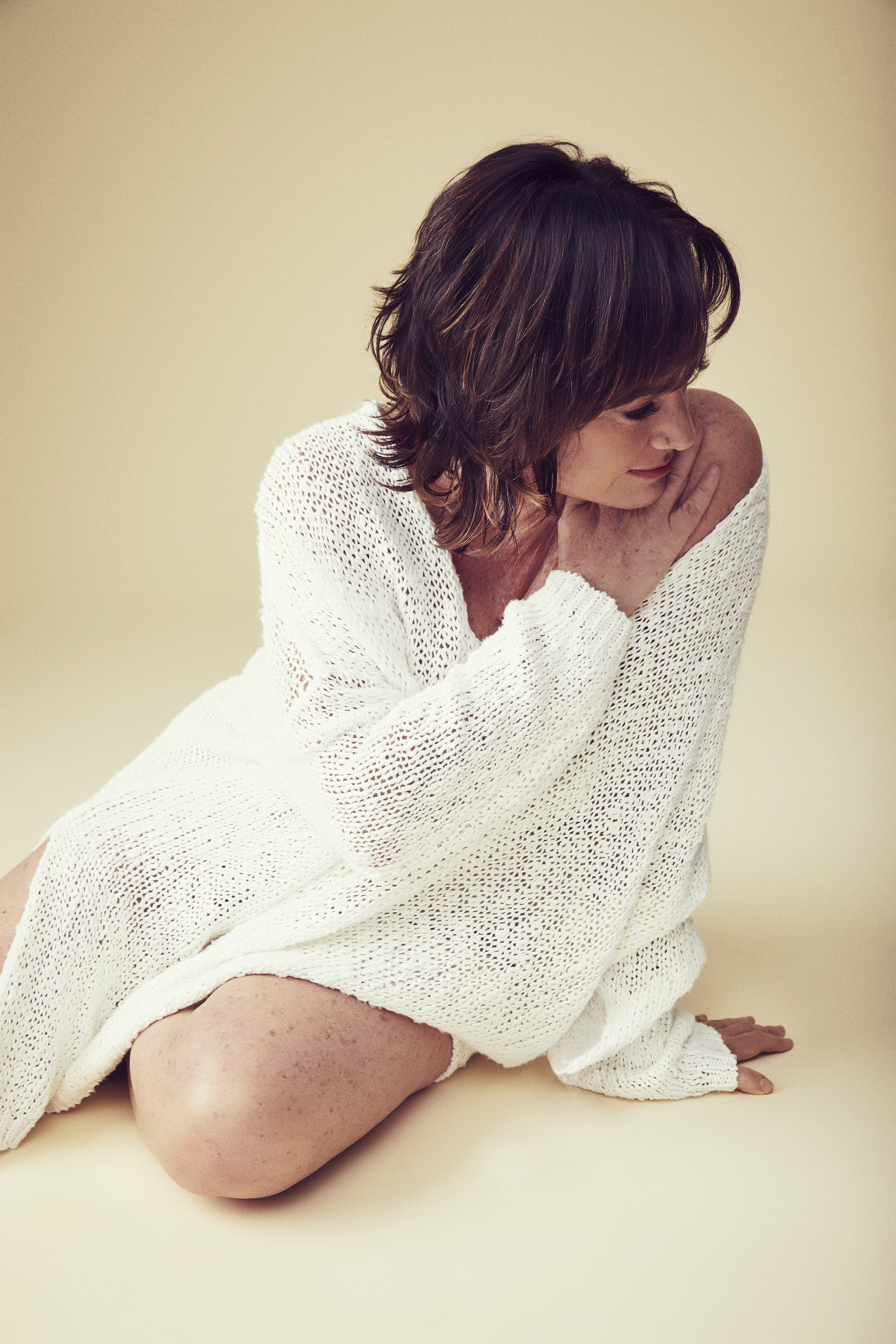
Argentine singer-songwriter Claudia Brant, winner in 2019

=== 1980s ===
| Year | Work | Artist |
|---|---|---|
1984
| 1984 | Me Enamoré | José Feliciano |
| 1984 | Una Aventura Llamada Menudo | Menudo |
| 1984 | Bésame Mucho | Plácido Domingo |
| 1984 | Lani | Lani Hall |
| 1984 | Ven | José Luis Rodríguez |
1985
| 1985 | Siempre en Mi Corazón—Always in My Heart | Plácido Domingo |
| 1985 | Como Tu Quieres | José Feliciano |
| 1985 | Evolución | Menudo |
| 1985 | Invítame | Johnny |
| 1985 | María Conchita | María Conchita Alonso |
| 1985 | Secretos | José José |
1986
| 1986 | Es Fácil Amar | Lani Hall |
| 1986 | "Por Ella" | José Feliciano and José José |
| 1986 | Reflexiones | José José |
| 1986 | Sólo Una Mujer | Lucía Méndez |
| 1986 | Ya Soy Tuyo | José Feliciano |
1987
| 1987 | "Le Lo Lai" | José Feliciano |
| 1987 | "¿Cómo Te Va Mi Amor?" | Pandora |
| 1987 | Inolvidable Tito... A Mi Me Pasa lo Mismo que a Usted | Danny Rivera |
| 1987 | "Pruebame" | José José |
| 1987 | "Yo Te Pido Amor" | Yuri |
1988
| 1988 | Un Hombre Solo | Julio Iglesias |
| 1988 | Amar o Morir | Danny Rivera |
| 1988 | "En Bancarrota" | Braulio |
| 1988 | Laberinto de Amor | Yolandita Monge |
| 1988 | Luis Miguel '87: Soy Como Quiero Ser | Luis Miguel |
| 1988 | Lunna | Lunna |
| 1988 | "Otra Mentira Más" | María Conchita Alonso |
| 1988 | Siempre Contigo | José José |
| 1988 | Solo | Emmanuel |
1989
| 1989 | Roberto Carlos | Roberto Carlos |
| 1989 | Las Apariencias Engañan | Raphael |
| 1989 | Cae la Noche | Dyango |
| 1989 | Soy Así | José José |
| 1989 | Sueño de Libertad | José Luis Perales |

=== 1990s ===
| Year | Work | Artist |
|---|---|---|
1990
| 1990 | "Cielito Lindo" | José Feliciano |
| 1990 | América | Miguel Gallardo |
| 1990 | "Baila Mi Rumba" | José Luis Rodríguez |
| 1990 | Chayanne | Chayanne |
| 1990 | Suspiros | Dyango |
1991
| 1991 | "¿Por Qué Te Tengo Que Olvidar?" | José Feliciano |
| 1991 | 20 Años | Luis Miguel |
| 1991 | Autobiografía | Duncan Dhu |
| 1991 | Quién Como Tú | Ana Gabriel |
| 1991 | "Se Me Enamora el Alma" | Isabel Pantoja |
1992
| 1992 | Cosas del Amor | Vikki Carr |
| 1992 | Amada Más Que Nunca | Daniela Romo |
| 1992 | ...Con Amor Eterno | Pandora |
| 1992 | Flor de Papel | Alejandra Guzmán |
| 1992 | A Través de Tus Ojos | Los Bukis |
1993
| 1993 | Otro Día Más Sin Verte | Jon Secada |
| 1993 | Agua Nueva | Cristian Castro |
| 1993 | Ave Fénix | Raphael |
| 1993 | Calor | Julio Iglesias |
| 1993 | El Puma en Ritmo | José Luis Rodríguez |
| 1993 | Romance | Luis Miguel |
1994
| 1994 | Aries | Luis Miguel |
| 1994 | Algo Más Que Amor | The Triplets |
| 1994 | Brindo a la Vida, al Bolero, a Ti | Vikki Carr |
| 1994 | Imáginame | María Conchita Alonso |
| 1994 | Latin Street '92 | José Feliciano |
1995
| 1995 | Segundo Romance | Luis Miguel |
| 1995 | El Camino del Alma | Cristian Castro |
| 1995 | De Mi Alma Latina | Plácido Domingo |
| 1995 | Gracias Por Esperar | Juan Gabriel |
| 1995 | Vida | La Mafia |
1996
| 1996 | Amor | Jon Secada |
| 1996 | La Carretera | Julio Iglesias |
| 1996 | Cuando los Ángeles Lloran | Maná |
| 1996 | Hay Amores y Amores | Rocío Dúrcal |
| 1996 | Nuestras Canciones | Adolfo Angel & Gustavo Angel |
1997
| 1997 | Enrique Iglesias | Enrique Iglesias |
| 1997 | Americano | José Feliciano |
| 1997 | Emociones | Vikki Carr |
| 1997 | Nada Es Igual... | Luis Miguel |
| 1997 | En Pleno Vuelo | Marco Antonio Solís |
1998
| 1998 | Romances | Luis Miguel |
| 1998 | Lo Mejor de Mí | Cristian Castro |
| 1998 | Me Estoy Enamorando | Alejandro Fernández |
| 1998 | Tango | Julio Iglesias |
| 1998 | Vivir | Enrique Iglesias |
1999
| 1999 | Vuelve | Ricky Martin |
| 1999 | Atado a Tu Amor | Chayanne |
| 1999 | Celebrando 25 Años de Juan Gabriel: En Concierto en el Palacio de Bellas Artes | Juan Gabriel |
| 1999 | Cosas del Amor | Enrique Iglesias |
| 1999 | Señor Bolero | José Feliciano |

=== 2000s ===
| Year | Work | Artist |
|---|---|---|
2000
| 2000 | Tiempos | Rubén Blades |
| 2000 | Amarte Es un Placer | Luis Miguel |
| 2000 | Llegar a Tí | Jaci Velasquez |
| 2000 | MTV Unplugged | Maná |
| 2000 | Ni Es Lo Mismo Ni Es Igual | Juan Luis Guerra |
2001
| 2001 | MTV Unplugged | Shakira |
| 2001 | El Alma al Aire | Alejandro Sanz |
| 2001 | Mi Reflejo | Christina Aguilera |
| 2001 | Oscar De La Hoya | Oscar De La Hoya |
| 2001 | Vivo | Luis Miguel |
2002
| 2002 | La Música de Baldemar Huerta | Freddy Fender |
| 2002 | Abrázame Muy Fuerte | Juan Gabriel |
| 2002 | Azul | Cristian Castro |
| 2002 | Mi Corazón | Jaci Velasquez |
| 2002 | Simplemente | Chayanne |
2003
| 2003 | Caraluna | Bacilos |
| 2003 | Bohemio Enamorado | Donato Poveda |
| 2003 | Moreno | Jorge Moreno |
| 2003 | Un Mundo Diferente | Diego Torres |
| 2003 | Sin Bandera | Sin Bandera |
2004
| 2004 | No Es lo Mismo | Alejandro Sanz |
| 2004 | 33 | Luis Miguel |
| 2004 | Lo Que te Conté Mientras te Hacías la Dormida | La Oreja de Van Gogh |
| 2004 | Natalia Lafourcade | Natalia Lafourcade |
| 2004 | Sincero | Chayanne |
2005
| 2005 | Amar Sin Mentiras | Marc Anthony |
| 2005 | MTV Unplugged | Diego Torres |
| 2005 | Pau-Latina | Paulina Rubio |
| 2005 | El Rock de Mi Pueblo | Carlos Vives |
| 2005 | Sin Vergüenza | Bacilos |
2006
| 2006 | Escucha | Laura Pausini |
| 2006 | Andrea Echeverri | Andrea Echeverri |
| 2006 | Citi Zen | Kevin Johansen |
| 2006 | Eco | Jorge Drexler |
| 2006 | Solo | Ricardo Arjona |
2007
| 2007 | Adentro (TIE) | Ricardo Arjona |
| 2007 | Limón y Sal (TIE) | Julieta Venegas |
| 2007 | Individual | Fulano |
| 2007 | Lo Que Trajo el Barco | Obie Bermúdez |
| 2007 | Trozos de Mi Alma, Vol. 2 | Marco Antonio Solís |
2008
| 2008 | El Tren de los Momentos | Alejandro Sanz |
| 2008 | 12 Segundos de Oscuridad | Jorge Drexler |
| 2008 | Dicen Que El Tiempo | Jennifer Peña |
| 2008 | Navidades | Luis Miguel |
| 2008 | Papito | Miguel Bosé and Various Artists |
2009
| 2009 | La Vida... Es Un Ratico | Juanes |
| 2009 | Cara B | Jorge Drexler |
| 2009 | Cómplices | Luis Miguel |
| 2009 | Palabras del Silencio | Luis Fonsi |
| 2009 | Tarde o Temprano | Tommy Torres |

=== 2010s ===
| Year | Work | Artist |
|---|---|---|
2010
| 2010 | Sin Frenos | La Quinta Estación |
| 2010 | 5to Piso | Ricardo Arjona |
| 2010 | Gran City Pop | Paulina Rubio |
| 2010 | Hu Hu Hu | Natalia Lafourcade |
| 2010 | Te Acuerdas... | Francisco Céspedes |
2011
| 2011 | Paraíso Express | Alejandro Sanz |
| 2011 | Alex Cuba | Alex Cuba |
| 2011 | Boleto de Entrada | Kany García |
| 2011 | Otra Cosa | Julieta Venegas |
| 2011 | Poquita Ropa | Ricardo Arjona |
2013
| 2013 | MTV Unplugged: Deluxe Edition | Juanes |
| 2013 | ¿Con Quién Se Queda El Perro? | Jesse & Joy |
| 2013 | Ilusión | Fonseca |
| 2013 | Independiente | Ricardo Arjona |
| 2013 | Kany García | Kany García |
2014
| 2014 | Vida | Draco Rosa |
| 2014 | 12 Historias | Tommy Torres |
| 2014 | Faith, Hope y Amor | Frankie J |
| 2014 | Syntek | Aleks Syntek |
| 2014 | Viajero Frecuente | Ricardo Montaner |
2015
| 2015 | Tangos | Rubén Blades |
| 2015 | Elypse | Camila |
| 2015 | Gracias Por Estar Aquí | Marco Antonio Solís |
| 2015 | Loco de Amor | Juanes |
| 2015 | Raíz | Lila Downs, Niña Pastori and Soledad |
2016
| 2016 | A Quien Quiera Escuchar (Deluxe Edition) | Ricky Martin |
| 2016 | Algo Sucede | Julieta Venegas |
| 2016 | Healer | Alex Cuba |
| 2016 | Sirope | Alejandro Sanz |
| 2016 | Terral | Pablo Alborán |
2017
| 2017 | Un Besito Más | Jesse & Joy |
| 2017 | Buena Vida | Diego Torres |
| 2017 | Ilusión | Gaby Moreno |
| 2017 | Seguir Latiendo | Sanalejo |
| 2017 | Similares | Laura Pausini |
2018
| 2018 | El Dorado | Shakira |
| 2018 | Amar y Vivir: En Vivo desde la Ciudad de México, 2017 | La Santa Cecilia |
| 2018 | Lo Único Constante | Alex Cuba |
| 2018 | Mis Planes Son Amarte | Juanes |
| 2018 | Musas (Un Homenaje al Folclore Latinoamericano en Manos de Los Macorinos) | Natalia Lafourcade |
2019
| 2019 | Sincera | Claudia Brant |
| 2019 | 2:00 AM | Raquel Sofía |
| 2019 | Musas (Un Homenaje al Folclore Latinoamericano En Manos de Los Macorinos), Vol. 2 | Natalia Lafourcade |
| 2019 | Prometo | Pablo Alboran |
| 2019 | Vives | Carlos Vives |

=== 2020s ===
| Year | Work | Artist |
|---|---|---|
2020
| 2020 | #ElDisco | Alejandro Sanz |
| 2020 | 11:11 | Maluma |
| 2020 | Fantasía | Sebastián Yatra |
| 2020 | Montaner | Ricardo Montaner |
| 2020 | Vida | Luis Fonsi |
2021
| 2021 | YHLQMDLG | Bad Bunny |
| 2021 | 3:33 | Debi Nova |
| 2021 | Mesa Para Dos | Kany García |
| 2021 | Pausa | Ricky Martin |
| 2021 | Por Primera Vez | Camilo |
2022
| 2022 | Mendó | Alex Cuba |
| 2022 | Hecho a la Antigua | Ricardo Arjona |
| 2022 | Mis Amores | Paula Arenas |
| 2022 | Mis Manos | Camilo |
| 2022 | Revelación | Selena Gomez |
| 2022 | Vértigo | Pablo Alborán |
2023
| 2023 | Pasieros | Rubén Blades and Boca Livre |
| 2023 | Aguilera | Christina Aguilera |
| 2023 | De Adentro Pa Afuera | Camilo |
| 2023 | Dharma + | Sebastián Yatra |
| 2023 | Viajante | Fonseca |
2024
| 2024 | X Mí (Vol. 1) | Gaby Moreno |
| 2024 | Beautiful Humans, Vol. 1 | AleMor |
| 2024 | A Ciegas | Paula Arenas |
| 2024 | La Cuarta Hoja | Pablo Alborán |
| 2024 | Don Juan | Maluma |
| 2024 | La Neta | Pedro Capó |
2025
| 2025 | Las Mujeres Ya No Lloran | Shakira |
| 2025 | Funk Generation | Anitta |
| 2025 | García | Kany García |
| 2025 | Orquídeas | Kali Uchis |
| 2025 | El Viaje | Luis Fonsi |
2026
| 2026 | Cancionera | Natalia Lafourcade |
| 2026 | Bogotá (Deluxe) | Andrés Cepeda |
| 2026 | Cosa Nuestra | Rauw Alejandro |
| 2026 | Tropicoqueta | Karol G |
| 2026 | ¿Y Ahora Qué? | Alejandro Sanz |
2027
| 2027 | Bendito Verano | Elena Rose |
| 2027 | ¿Dónde es el After? | Rawayana |
| 2027 | Femme Fatale | Mon Laferte |
| 2027 | Muda | Carín León |
| 2027 | No Me Arrepiento de Sentir Tanto | Karol G |

- Notes:
  - ^{^[I]} Each year is linked to the article about the Grammy Awards held that year.

== Artists with multiple wins ==
4 wins

- José Feliciano
- Alejandro Sanz

3 wins

- Rubén Blades
- Shakira
- Luis Miguel

2 wins

- Juanes
- Ricky Martin
- Jon Secada

== Artists with multiple nominations ==
12 nominations

- Luis Miguel

10 nominations

- José Feliciano

7 nominations

- Alejandro Sanz

6 nominations

- Ricardo Arjona
- José José

5 nominations

- Natalia Lafourcade

4 nominations

- Pablo Alborán
- Cristian Castro
- Chayanne
- Alex Cuba
- Kany García
- Julio Iglesias
- Juanes

3 nominations

- María Conchita Alonso
- Rubén Blades
- Camilo
- Vikki Carr
- Plácido Domingo
- Jorge Drexler
- Luis Fonsi
- Juan Gabriel
- Ricky Martin
- José Luis Rodríguez
- Shakira
- Marco Antonio Solís
- Diego Torres
- Julieta Venegas

2 nominations

- Christina Aguilera
- Paula Arenas
- Bacilos
- Dyango
- Fonseca
- Jesse & Joy
- Lani Hall
- Karol G
- Maluma
- Menudo
- Ricardo Montaner
- Gaby Moreno
- Pandora
- Laura Pausini
- Raphael
- Danny Rivera
- Paulina Rubio
- Jon Secada
- Tommy Torres
- Jaci Velasquez
- Carlos Vives
- Sebastián Yatra

== See also ==
- Grammy Award for Best Latin Pop, Rock or Urban Album
- Grammy Award for Best Latin Recording
- Lo Nuestro Award for Pop Album of the Year
