= Anatomy of Love =

Studio album by Vikki Carr
- Released: 1965
- Genre: Pop
- Label: Liberty
- Producer: Dave Pell

Vikki Carr chronology
Discovery Vol. II (1964)	Anatomy of Love (1965)	The Way of Today (1966)

Professional ratings
Review scores
Source	Rating
Record Mirror	5/5 stars

Anatomy of Love is the fourth album by Vikki Carr, released in 1965 on the Liberty Records label. The album sleeve included a liner note by Ethel Merman praising Carr's talent.

== Track listing ==
Side 1

1. "Put on a Happy Face" (Charles Strouse, Lee Adams) - 2:38
2. "Them There Eyes" (Maceo Pinkard, Doris Tauber, William Tracey) - 1:58
3. "None But the Lonely Heart" (Dave Pell, Mort Garson) - 2:53
4. "Baby Face" (Harry Akst, Benny Davis) - 2:40
5. "Heartaches" (Al Hoffman, John Klenner) - 2:17
6. "I’ve Grown Accustomed to His Face" (Alan Jay Lerner, Frederick Loewe) - 2:33

Side 2

1. "Everything I’ve Got" (Richard Rodgers, Lorenz Hart) - 2:08
2. "Cross Your Heart" (Buddy DeSylva, Lewis Gensler) - 2:37
3. "Look at That Face" (Leslie Bricusse, Anthony Newley) - 2:42
4. "I Only Have Eyes for You" (Harry Warren, Al Dubin) - 2:18
5. "That’s All" (Bob Haymes, Alan Brandt) - 2:14
6. ”Real Live Boy” (Carolyn Leigh, Cy Coleman) - 1:58

NB: Timings are actual from an original LP.

== Production ==
- Produced by: Dave Pell
- Arranged by: Bob Florence & Mort Carson
- Engineers: "Lanky" Linstrot & Dave Weichman
- Album cover design: Studio 5, Inc.
- Album cover photograph: John Engstead
