= Juno Award for Latin Music Recording of the Year =

Canadian music award

The Juno Award for Latin Music Recording of the Year is an annual Canadian music award, presented by the Juno Awards to honour Latin music recordings by Canadian artists. It was presented for the first time at the Juno Awards of 2026.

Prior to the award's creation, Latin music recordings were eligible for Global Music Album of the Year. Alex Cuba, the inaugural winner of the Latin music category, was previously a two-time winner of the global music award.

== Winners and nominees ==
Year	Winner	Album	Nominees	Ref.
2026	Alex Cuba	Índole	Isabella Lovestory, Vanity; Lido Pimienta, La Belleza; Mario Puglia, He Sanado Varias Cosas; Andy Rubal, Baila y Confía	
