= One Hell of a Woman (album) =

Studio album by Vikki Carr
- Released: 1974
- Recorded: A&M (Hollywood); RCA Studios (Hollywood)
- Genre: Adult contemporary
- Label: Columbia
- Producers: Jack Gold, Vikki Carr

Vikki Carr chronology
Live at The Greek Theatre (1973)	One Hell of a Woman (1974)	Hoy (1975)

One Hell of a Woman is the 20th studio album by American singer Vikki Carr (born Florencia Bisenta de Casillas Martinez Cardona in El Paso Texas on July 19, 1941) released in 1974 on the Columbia Records label. It reached #155 in the US Billboard 200 chart. Three singles were released from the album, "Sleeping Between Two People", "One Hell of a Woman" and "Wind Me Up", the latter reaching #45 in the US adult contemporary chart. In 2000, Collectables reissued two of Carr's early-'70s releases on one disc. Both "Ms. America" (released in 1973) and "One Hell of a Woman".

== Track listing ==
Side 1

1. "One Hell of a Woman" (Mac Davis, Mark James) – 3:01
2. "Between Two People" (Al Kasha, Joel Hirschhorn) – 2:35
3. "Ain't No Way to Treat a Lady" (Harriet Schock) – 3:33
4. "That's the Way We Fall in Love" (Michael Wecht) – 2:37
5. "Haven't Got Time for the Pain" (Jacob Brackman, Carly Simon) – 3:26
6. "Sunshine on My Shoulders" (John Denver, Dick Kniss, Mike Taylor) – 4:27

Side 2

1. "Wind Me Up" (Brian Thompson, Susan Maddox) – 3:00
2. "The Need to Be" (Jim Weatherly) – 3:45
3. "Let Me be the One" (Paul Williams, Roger Nichols) – 3:30
4. "I'll Have to Say I Love You in a Song" (Jim Croce) – 2:59
5. "Hold My Hand" (Mac Davis, G. Costa) – 2:42

== Production ==
- Co-produced by: Jack Gold & Vikki Carr
- Engineer (A&M): Richard Bogert
- Engineer (RCA): Mickey Crofford
- Arrangers: Jimmie Haskell, Sid Feller & Larry Muhoberac
- Background vocals: The Ron Hinklin Singers
- Album photography: Ed Caraeff
- Vocals: Vikki Carr
- Drums: Hal Blaine (special thanks)
