= It Must Be Him (Vikki Carr album) =

Studio album by Vikki Carr
- Released: September 1967
- Genre: Pop
- Label: Liberty
- Producers: Tommy Oliver, Dave Pell

Singles from It Must Be Him
- 1. "It Must Be Him" Released: August 1967

It Must Be Him is a 1967 album by Vikki Carr. The album reached No. 12 on the Billboard albums chart and is the singer's most successful English-language release. The title song reached No. 3 on the Billboard singles chart. The track was produced by Tommy Oliver.

It was nominated by the Grammys for Album of the Year in 1968 but lost to Sgt. Pepper's Lonely Hearts Club Band.

== Track listing ==
1. "It Must Be Him" (Gilbert Bécaud, Mack David)
2. "Can't Take My Eyes Off You" (Bob Crewe, Bob Gaudio)
3. "One More Mountain" (Gary LeMel, Tommy Oliver)
4. "A Million Years or So" (Roger Miller)
5. "So Much in Love With You" (Bodie Chandler, Edward McKendry)
6. "Tunesmith" (Jimmy Webb)
7. "A Bit of Love" (Don Addrisi, Dick Addrisi)
8. "Alfie" (Burt Bacharach, Hal David)
9. "Forget You" (Renato Rascel, Joe Sherman, George David Weiss)
10. "Look Again (Theme From "Irma La Douce")" (André Previn, Dory Langdon)
11. "Her Little Heart Went to Loveland" (Buddy Kaye, Philip Springer)

== Alternative track listing (Liberty LBS 83037) ==
1. " It Must Be Him" (Gilbert Bécaud, Mack David)
2. "None But The Lonely Heart" (Arranged and adapted by Dave Pell)
3. "Her Little Heart Went To Loveland" (Buddy Kaye, Philip Springer)
4. "Laia Ladaia (Reza)" (Edu Lobo, Ruy Guerra, Norman Gimbel)
5. "Look Again (Theme From "Irma La Douce")" (André Previn, Dory Langdon)
6. "Forget You" (Renato Rascel, Joe Sherman, George David Weiss)
7. "Cuando Caliente El Sol" (Carlos Rigual, Mario Rigual, Maurice Vaughan)
8. "How Does The Wine Taste" (Harold Karr, Matt Dubey)
9. "Should I Follow" (Pamela Polland)
10. "May I Come In" (Jack Segal, Marvin Fisher)
11. "Toys" (Manley, Florence)
12. "San Francisco" (Bronisław Kaper, Walter Jurmann)
