= Recuerdo a Javier Solís =

Studio album by Vikki Carr
- Released: 1994
- Studio: Santa Fé Recording, Van Nuys, California
- Genre: Latin, Latin pop
- Length: 39:33
- Label: Sony
- Producer: Chuck Anderson

Vikki Carr chronology
| Brindo a La Vida, Al Bolero, A Ti (1992) | Recuerdo a Javier Solís (1994) | Emociones (1996) |

Recuerdo a Javier Solís (I remember Javier Solís) is an album that was released in 1994 by Vikki Carr. It won a Grammy Award for Best Mexican-American Recording. The album contains the hit song Amaneci en Tus Brazos. The album is a tribute to Javier Solís, a popular Mexican singer who died in 1966.

== Tracks ==
| No. | Title | Music | Translated title | Length |
|---|---|---|---|---|
| 1. | "Sombras" | José María Contursí | Shadows | 3:21 |
| 2. | "En Mi Víejo San Juan" (Duet with Danny Rivera) | Noel Estrada | In My Old San Juan | 3:08 |
| 3. | "Escándalo" (Duet with Danny Rivera) | Rafael Cardenas; Rubén Fuentes | Scandal | 2:35 |
| 4. | "Llorarás, Llorarás" | Raffael Ramirez | You Will Cry, Cry | 3:18 |
| 5. | "Y Háblame" | Paco Michael | And Call Me | 3:55 |
| 6. | "Payaso" | Fernando Z. Maldonado | Clown | 3:29 |
| 7. | "Si Dios Me Quita la Vída" | Luis Demetrio | If God Should End My Life | 3:23 |
| 8. | "Amaneci en Tus Brazos" (Duet with Javier Solís) | José Alfredo Jiménez | I Woke Up in Your Arms | 4:14 |
| 9. | "Adelante" | Mario DeJesús | Onward | 2:47 |
| 10. | "Entrega Total" | Abelardo Pulido | Total Pleading | 2:54 |
| 11. | "Perdóname Mi Vída" | Gabriel Ruíz; José Antonio Zorrilla | Pardon Me, My Life | 3:32 |
| 12. | "Retirada" | José Alfredo Jiménez | Rested | 2:57 |
| Total length: | | | | 39:33 |

=== "Payaso" ===
The song "Payaso" is a retelling of the story of the opera "Pagliacci" ("Clowns") by Ruggero Leoncavallo ("payaso" is Spanish for "clown").

== Personnel ==
Performers

- Lead vocals – Vikki Carr
- Guest vocals – Danny Rivera, Javier Solís

Musicians

- Guitar – Arturo Salas
- Guitarrón – Miguel Vázquez

Production

- Arranger – Chuck Anderson
- Art director – Arturo Medellin
- Composers – Rafael Cardenas, José María Contursí, Mario DeJesús, Luis Demetrio, Noel Estrada, Rubén Fuentes, José Alfredo Jiménez, Fernando Z. Maldonado, Paco Michael, Abelardo Pulido, Raffael Ramirez, José Antonio Zorilla
- Director – Chuck Anderson
- Engineer – Robert Russell
- Graphic design – Rocio Larrazolo
- Liner notes – Chuck Anderson
- Mixing – Robert Russell
- Photography – Harry Langdon
- Producer – Chuck Anderson
