= Alex Cuba =

Cuban-Canadian musician (born 1974)

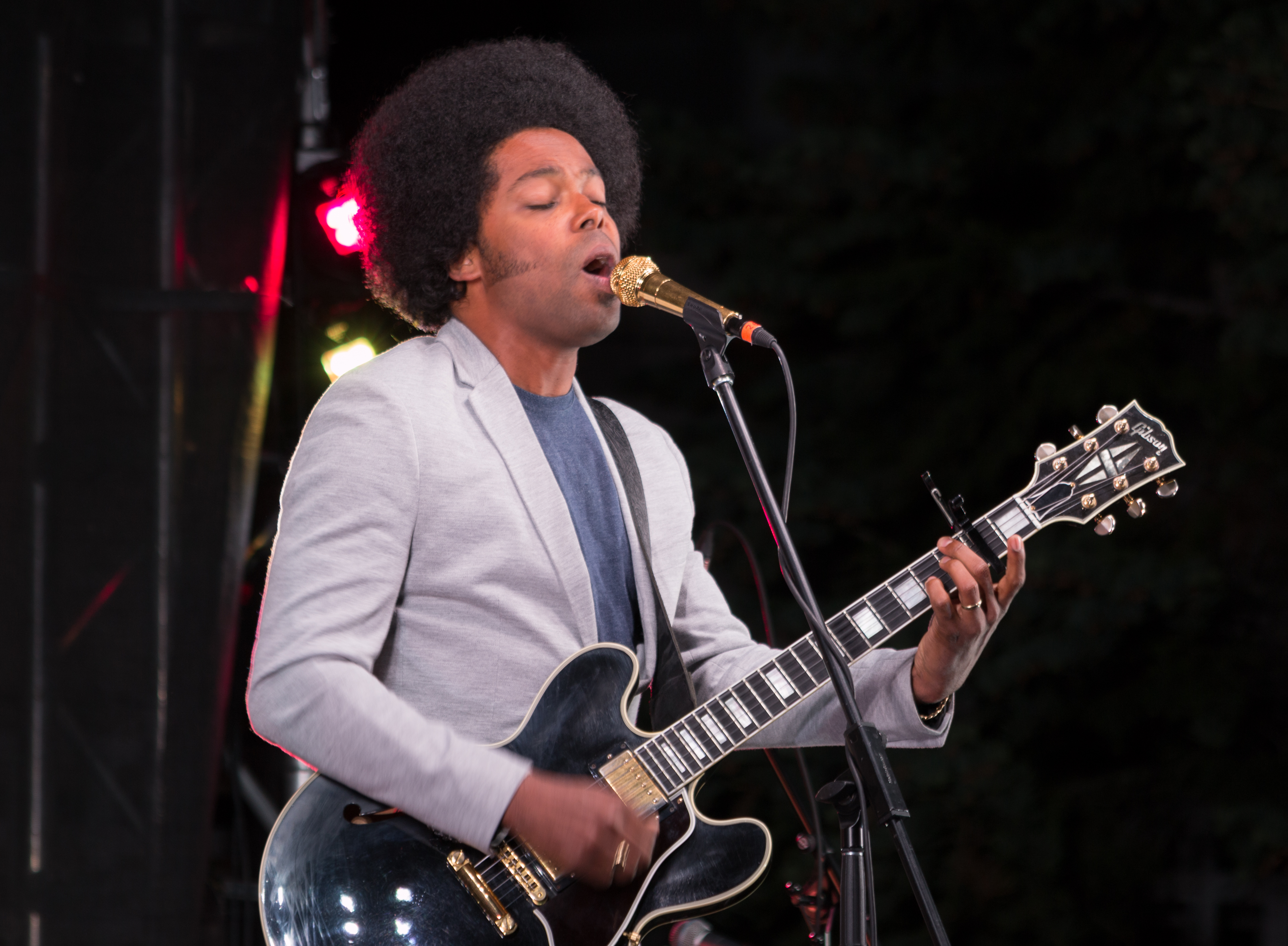
- Alex Cuba performing at the 2015 Burlington's Sound of Music Festival

Background information
- Born: Alexis Puentes; March 29, 1974 (age 52)
- Origin: Artemisa, Cuba
- Genres: Afro-Cuban jazz, pop
- Occupation: Musician
- Labels: Shell, Caracol
- Website: alexcuba.com

Alexis Puentes (born 1974), better known by his stage name Alex Cuba, is a Cuban-Canadian singer-songwriter who sings in Spanish and English. He has won three Juno Awards in his career, with two wins for World Music Album of the Year in 2006 for Humo de Tabaco, and in 2008 for his second album, Agua del Pozo, and one win for Latin Music Recording of the Year in 2026 for Índole.

In 2010 he won the Latin Grammy for Best New Artist. His 2015 album, Healer, earned him a Latin Grammy Award for Best Singer-Songwriter Album and a Grammy Award nomination for Best Latin Pop Album. His 2021 album Mendó won the 2022 Grammy for Best Latin Pop Album.

== Biography ==
Puentes was born on March 29, 1974 in Cuba, spending his childhood in Artemisa. The son of guitar player and music teacher Valentin Puentes, he started playing guitar at the age of six. As an adult, he shifted into jazz fusion styles. He immigrated to Canada in 1999 after marrying a Canadian in Cuba. He and his twin brother Adonis first settled in Victoria, British Columbia, and worked as a duo called the Puentes Brothers, receiving a Juno Award nomination for Best Global Album at the Juno Awards of 2001. They parted ways as a band to launch solo careers in 2004. In 2003, Puentes moved to Smithers, British Columbia, the hometown of his wife, Sarah, whose father is politician Bill Goodacre. They have three children: Daniel, Rose and Owen Puentes.

Collaborators on his debut, Humo De Tabaco, include Ron Sexsmith and Corinne Bailey Rae. "Lo Mismo Que Yo", a duet with Sexsmith, became a hit in the UK Singles Chart, reaching No. 52.

In 2009, he co-wrote and recorded a duet with fellow Canadian Nelly Furtado. "Mi Plan" turned out to be the title track for her fourth studio album of the same name. Puentes co-wrote more than half of the songs on Furtado's album.

His music reflects primarily Latin and African influences, but with a mix of funk, jazz and pop.

He received a Latin Grammy on November 21, 2013.

In 2016, he performed as part of the national Canada Day celebration on Parliament Hill in Ottawa.

His 2021 album Mendó won the 2022 Grammy for Best Latin Pop Album; it was his fourth nomination for the award and his first Grammy win.

In 2022, he received an honorary doctorate from Queen's University.

He gave a Tiny Desk Concert with his band in 2023.

At the Juno Awards of 2026, he was the inaugural winner of the new Juno Award for Latin Music Recording of the Year for his album Índole.

== Discography ==
- The Puentes Brothers:
  - 2001: Morumba Cubana
- Solo:
  - 2004: Humo de Tabaco
  - 2007: Agua del Pozo
  - 2009: Alex Cuba
  - 2012: Static in the System – "Ruido en el sistema"
  - 2015: Healer
  - 2017: "Lo Único Constante"
  - 2019: "Sublime"
  - 2021: "Mendó"
  - 2023: "El Swing Que Yo Tengo"
  - 2025: Índole

== Awards and nominations ==
=== Grammy Awards ===
The Grammy Award is an accolade by the National Academy of Recording Arts and Sciences of the United States to recognize outstanding achievement on the music industry. Cuba has received four nominations.

Year	Nominee / work	Award	Result
2011	Alex Cuba	Best Latin Pop Album	Nominated
2016	Healer	Best Latin Pop Album	Nominated
2018	Lo Único Constante	Best Latin Pop Album	Nominated
2022	Mendó	Best Latin Pop Album	Won

=== Latin Grammy Awards ===
A Latin Grammy Award is an accolade by the Latin Academy of Recording Arts & Sciences to recognize outstanding achievement in the music industry. Alex Cuba has received four awards out of five nominations.

Year	Nominee / work	Award	Result
2010	Alex Cuba	Best New Artist	Won
2010	Alex Cuba	Best Male Pop Vocal Album	Nominated
2012	"Toma Mi Vida"	Best Tropical Song	Won
2013	"Eres Tú"	Best Short Form Music Video	Won
2015	Healer	Best Singer-Songwriter Album	Won
