= Brindo a La Vida, Al Bolero, A Ti =

Studio album by Vikki Carr
- Released: 1992
- Genre: Bolero
- Label: Sony Music Mexico
- Producer: Fernando Riba, Kiko Campos

Vikki Carr chronology
It Must Be Him – The Best of Vikki Carr (1992)	Brindo a La Vida, Al Bolero, A Ti (1992)	Recuerdo a Javier Solís (1994)

Professional ratings
Review scores
Source	Rating
AllMusic	3/5 stars

Brindo a La Vida, Al Bolero, A Ti (I Toast to Life, To Bolero, To You) is an album by the American musician Vikki Carr. It was nominated for a Grammy Award for Best Latin Pop Album. It produced a hit single in the song '"Dejame". The album was released in 1992 via the Sony label.

== Tracks ==
1. Dejame
2. Tuya Soy
3. La Cita
4. Te Vi
5. Cafe De La Mañana
6. Eclipse
7. Di Como Te Dejo De Amar
8. Una Mujer
9. Yo Se Que Te Voy Amar
10. Desesperadamente
11. Si Tu No Estas
12. Nadie
13. Fuimos Iguales
14. How Do I Stop Loving You
