= It Must Be Him (song) =

Song performed by Vikki Carr

Single by Vikki Carr

from the album It Must Be Him
- B-side: "On the Other Side of the Tracks" (UK); "That's All" (US and Canada)
- Released: 1967
- Genre: Easy listening; pop
- Length: 2:48
- Label: Liberty
- Songwriters: Gilbert Bécaud, Maurice Vidalin, Mack David (English lyrics)

Vikki Carr singles chronology
"There I Go" (1967)	"It Must Be Him" (1967)	"The Lesson" (1968)

"It Must Be Him" is a popular song with music written by Gilbert Bécaud, originally with French lyrics by Maurice Vidalin and recorded by Bécaud as "Seul Sur Son Étoile". The English version recorded by Vikki Carr, with lyrics by Mack David, was a hit around the world, reaching No. 3 in the United States, No. 2 in the UK, and No. 1 in Australia. The singer describes anxiously waiting by her telephone, desperately hoping that her former boyfriend will call, although they had separated.

== Vikki Carr version ==
New English lyrics (and a new English title) were written by Mack David. The song was published in 1967. The best-selling version of the song was recorded that year by Vikki Carr, which reached number three on the U.S. pop chart and spent three weeks at number one on the easy listening chart. The single peaked at number two in the United Kingdom, spent three weeks at number one in Australia and went to number thirteen in Ireland. Carr went on to record it in Spanish and Italian, as well. The original English recording of the song was featured in the 1987 Norman Jewison film Moonstruck.

=== Charts ===
Chart (1967)	Peak position
Australia (Go-Set)	1
Belgium (Ultratop 50 Flanders)	15
Belgium (Ultratop 50 Wallonia)	43
Canada Top Singles (RPM)	8
Ireland (IRMA)	13
New Zealand (Listener Chart)	13
UK Singles (Official Charts)	2
US Billboard Hot 100	3
US Adult Contemporary (Billboard)	1

== See also ==
- List of number-one adult contemporary singles of 1967 (U.S.)
