= Cosas del Amor (Vikki Carr album) =

Cosas Del Amor

Studio album by Vikki Carr
- Released: 1991
- Genre: Pop
- Label: Sony Music
- Producer: Roberto Livi and Rudy Perez

Vikki Carr chronology
Set Me Free (1990)	Cosas Del Amor (1991)	It Must Be Him – The Best of Vikki Carr (1992)

Cosas del Amor was a 1991 album by Vikki Carr that won a Grammy Award for Best Latin Pop Recording. The album produced the hit single, "Cosas del Amor", written by Rudy Perez & Roberto Livi, which reached No. 1 on the U.S. Latin charts for more than two months. The album also reached No. 1, where it stayed for one month. In the United States, this is her most successful Spanish-language disc.

== Track listing ==
1. "Me Estoy Volviendo Loca"
2. "Cosas del Amor" (duet with Ana Gabriel)
3. "No Me Lo Nombren"
4. "De Mujer a Mujer"
5. "Ni Los Primeros Ni Los Ultimos"
6. "Con Los Brazos Abiertos"
7. "Olvidar Por Olvidar"
8. "Atrapen al Ladron"
9. "Esta Noche"
10. "Palomo"

== See also ==
- List of number-one Billboard Latin Pop Albums from the 1990s
