= Emociones (Vikki Carr album) =

Studio album by Vikki Carr
- Released: 1996
- Genre: Pop
- Label: Rodven/PolyGram
- Producer: Chuck Anderson

Vikki Carr chronology
Recuerdo a Javier Solís (1994)	Emociones (1996)	Con el Mariachi Vargas de Tecalitlán (1998)

Professional ratings
Review scores
Source	Rating
The Encyclopedia of Popular Music	3/5 stars

Emociones (Emotions) is a 1996 album by American vocalist Vikki Carr. It was nominated for a Grammy Award for Best Latin Pop Performance. The album, which was released on the Rodven Records/PolyGram labels, is a tribute to songwriters Manuel Alejandro and Roberto Carlos.

== Track listing ==
1. Propuesta
2. Que Tal Te Va Sin Mi
3. Los Amantes
4. Emociones
5. La Distancia
6. Digan Lo Que Digan
7. Concavo y Convexo
8. Que No Se Rompa la Noche
9. En Carne Viva
10. A La Antigua
11. Para Volver a Volver
12. Detalles
