= Vikki Carr =

American vocalist

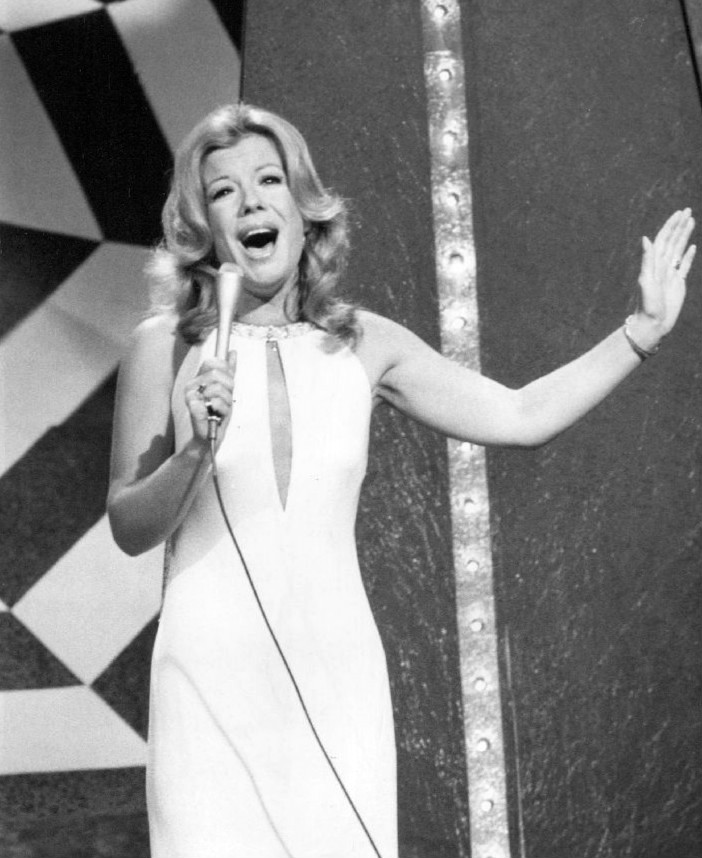
- Vikki Carr in 1974

Background information
- Born: Florencia Vicenta de Casillas-Martínez Cardona; July 19, 1940 (age 86); El Paso, Texas, U.S.
- Genres: Pop; jazz; country
- Occupation: Singer
- Instruments: Vocals; Guitar
- Years active: 1962–present
- Labels: Liberty; Columbia; UMG

Florencia Vicenta de Casillas-Martínez Cardona (born July 19, 1940), known by her stage name Vikki Carr, is an American vocalist. She has a singing career that spans more than six decades.

Born in El Paso, Texas, to Mexican parents, she has performed in a variety of musical genres, including pop, jazz and country, while her greatest success has come from singing in Spanish. She established the Vikki Carr Scholarship Foundation in 1971. Carr has won three Grammys and was honored with a Lifetime Achievement Award in 2008 at the 9th Annual Latin Grammy Awards.

== Career ==
Florencia Vicenta de Casillas-Martínez Cardona was born in El Paso, Texas, on July 19, 1940. In 1958, she graduated from Rosemead High School in Rosemead, California, in a class that included fashion designer Bob Mackie. Under the stage name Vikki Carr she signed with Liberty Records in 1962. Her first single to achieve success was "He's a Rebel", which in 1962 reached No. 3 in Australia and No. 115 in the United States. Producer Phil Spector heard Carr cutting the song in the studio and immediately produced his own cover version with the Blossoms (though it was presented as a recording by The Crystals) which reached No. 1 in the United States. In 1966, Carr toured South Vietnam with actor and comedian Danny Kaye to entertain American troops. The following year, her album It Must Be Him was nominated for three Grammy Awards. The title track reached No. 3 on the Billboard Hot 100 in the United States in 1967, sold more than 1 million copies and received a gold disc.

Carr followed with two US Top 40 hits: 1968's "The Lesson" and 1969's "With Pen in Hand". Around this time, Dean Martin called her "the best girl singer in the business." In total, Carr had 10 singles and 13 albums that made the US pop charts.

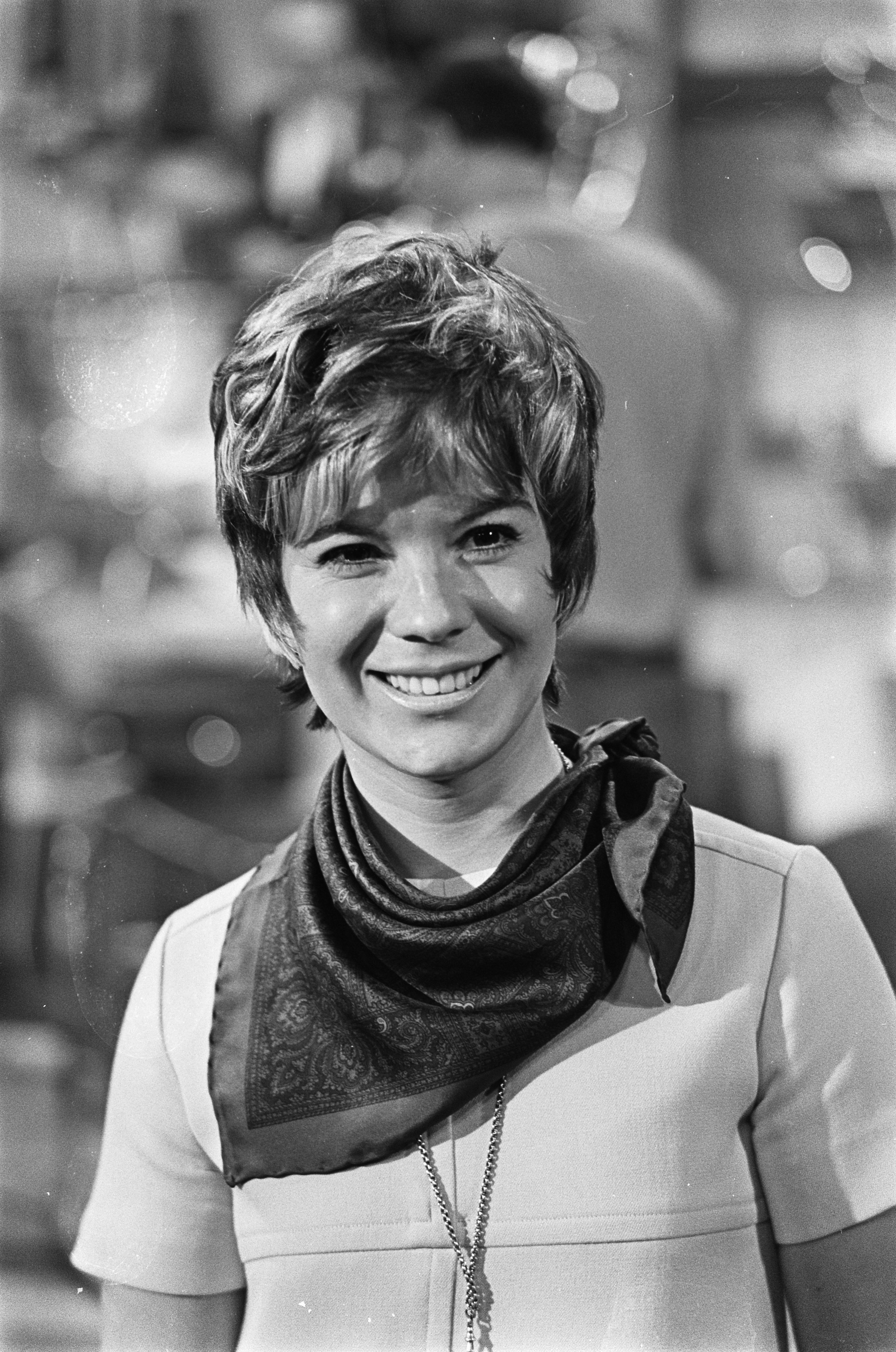
Vikki Carr in 1968

In 1968, Carr taped six specials for London Weekend TV. She made frequent appearances on various television programs, such as ABC's The Bing Crosby Show in the 1964–1965 season. She appeared on The Carol Burnett Show in 1969. In 1970, she was named "Woman of the Year" by the Los Angeles Times. A favourite of Johnny Carson's, she appeared more than 30 times on The Tonight Show Starring Johnny Carson, even hosting on occasion.

She received a star on the Hollywood Walk of Fame in 1981. Carr also achieved the rare feat of singing for five presidents during her career: Richard Nixon, Gerald Ford, Ronald Reagan, George Bush and Bill Clinton. The bi-cultural nature of her career has included recording with Vicente Fernandez and Pepe Aguilar, while Frank Sinatra and Dean Martin were friends.

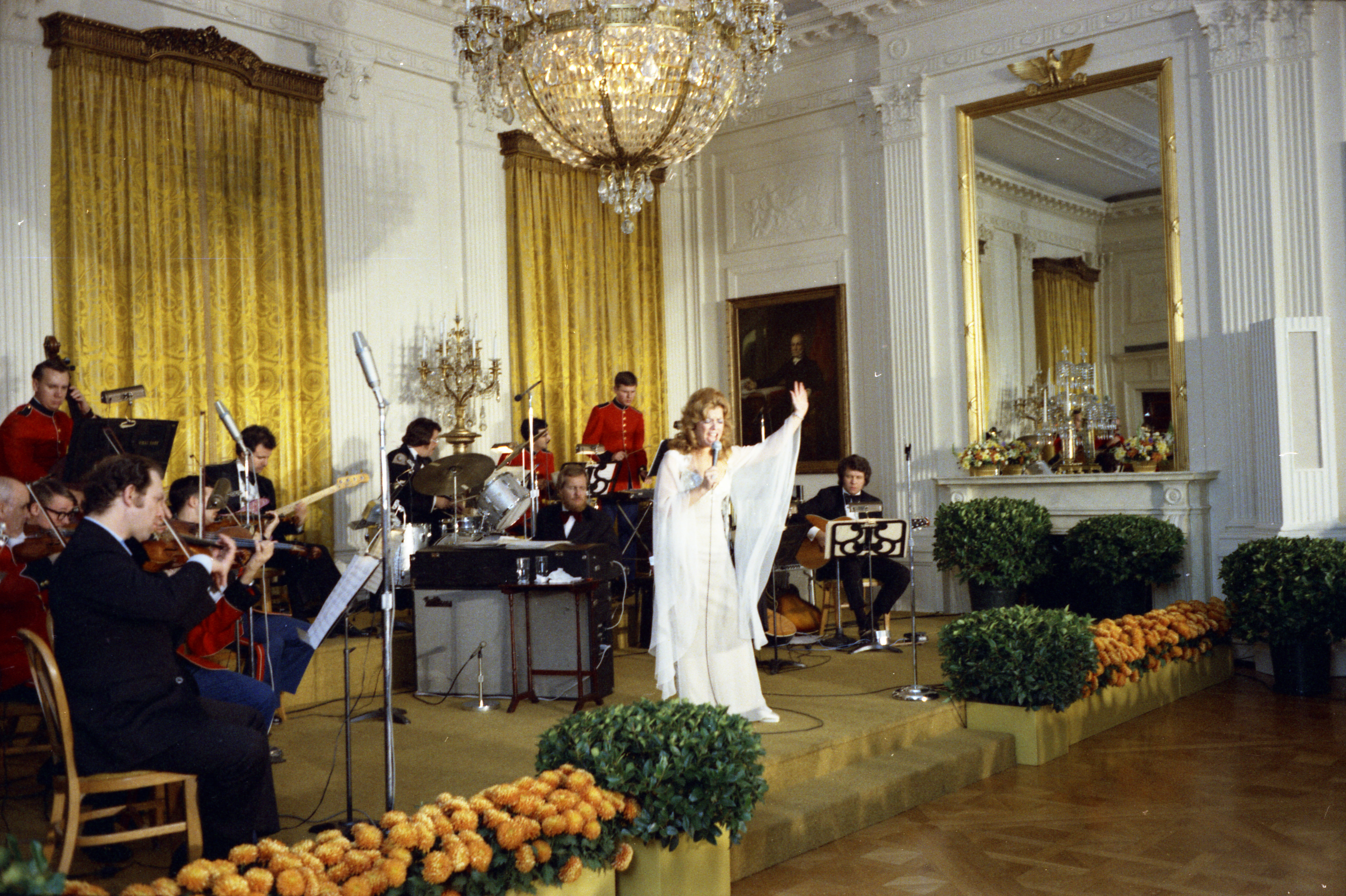
Carr performing in the East Room of the White House during a November 1974 state dinner

In the 1980s and 1990s, Carr had enormous success in the Latin music world, winning Grammy Awards for Best Mexican-American Performance in 1986 for her album Simplemente Mujer, Best Latin Pop Album in 1992 for Cosas del Amor and Best Mexican-American Performance in 1995 for Recuerdo a Javier Solís. She also received Grammy nominations for the discs Brindo a La Vida, Al Bolero, A Ti (1993) and Emociones (1996). Her numerous Spanish-language hit singles include "Total", "Discúlpame", "Déjame", "Hay Otro en Tu Lugar", "Esos Hombres", "Mala Suerte" and "Cosas del Amor". "Cosas del Amor" spent more than two months at No. 1 on the US Latin charts in 1991, her biggest Spanish-language US hit. Her Spanish-language albums have been certified gold and platinum in Mexico, Chile, Puerto Rico, Venezuela, Costa Rica, Colombia and Ecuador. She also voiced Georgette in the Latin American dub of Disney's Oliver & Company.

In 1999, Carr taped a PBS TV special, Vikki Carr: Memories, Memorias, in which she performed popular bilingual tunes from the 1940s and 1950s. Her guests were Arturo Sandoval and Jack Jones. In 2001, she released a bilingual holiday album, The Vikki Carr Christmas Album.

Carr appeared in a 2002 Los Angeles production of the Stephen Sondheim musical Follies, which also featured Hal Linden, Patty Duke and Harry Groener. In 2006, Carr made a cameo appearance in a straight-to-video thriller called Puerto Vallarta Squeeze. Carr hosted a PBS TV special in 2008, Fiesta Mexicana, which celebrated the music and dance of Mexico. Later that year she was honored with a Lifetime Achievement Award from the Latin Recording Academy. Carr marked the occasion with an appearance on the Latin Grammy telecast, in which she performed "Cosas del Amor" with Olga Tañón and Jenni Rivera.

In 2014, Carr was invited by producer Gerry Gallagher to record with Latin rock singers El Chicano, Alphonse Mouzon, Brian Auger, Alex Ligertwood, Salvador Santana, Ray Parker Jr., Lenny Castro, Siedah Garrett, Walfredo Reyes Jr., Pete Escovedo, Peter Michael Escovedo, Jessy J, Marcos J. Reyes and David Paich, and is featured on a remake of the Latin classic "Sabor A Mi" from a 2019 Gallagher studio album. In August, she headlined a benefit in El Paso for the Walmart shooting victims of the 2019 El Paso shooting.

== Personal life ==
Carr has been married three times, first to producer and entertainment attorney Dann Moss, then paint company executive Michael Nilsson. She was married to San Antonio, Texas physician Pedro De Leon from 1993 until his death in 2019.

== Charitable work ==
Carr devotes time to charities including the United Way, the American Lung Association, the Muscular Dystrophy Association, and St. Jude Children’s Research Hospital. For 22 years, she hosted benefit concerts to support Holy Cross of San Antonio Middle and High School in San Antonio, Texas. In 1971, she established the Vikki Carr Scholarship Foundation dedicated to offering college scholarships to Hispanic students in California and Texas.

== Discography ==
=== Albums ===
Year	Album	US	US Latin	UK	notes
1963	Color Her Great!	-	-	-	
1964	Discovery!	114	-	-	
1964	Discovery Vol. II	-	-	-	
1965	Anatomy of Love	-	-	-	liner notes by Ethel Merman
1966	The Way of Today!	-	-	31	
1967	Intimate Excitement	-	-	-	
1967	It Must Be Him	12	-	12	UK release differs from US release
1968	Vikki!	63	-	-	
1968	Don't Break My Pretty Balloon	-	-	-	
1969	For Once in My Life	29	-	-	live
1970	Nashville By Carr	111	-	-	recorded in Nashville
1971	The Ways to Love a Man	-	-	-	
1971	Que Sea El	-	-	-	
1971	Vikki Carr's Love Story	60	-	-	
1971	Superstar	118	-	-	
1972	The Best Of Vikki Carr	-	-	-	
1972	The First Time Ever (I Saw Your Face)	146	-	-	Song Sung Blue in UK
1972	En Español	106	-	-	
1973	Ms. America	142	-	-	
1973	Live at the Greek Theatre	172	-	-	
1974	One Hell of a Woman	155	-	-	
1975	Hoy	203	-	-	
1976	The Story of a Woman	-	-	-	live from Japan (JP release only)
1980	Y El Amor	-	-	-	
1981	El Retrato Del Amor	-	-	-	
1982	Vikki Carr	-	-	-	
1984	A Todos	-	-	-	
1985	Simplemente Mujer	-	-	-	No. 3 US Regional MX / No. 15 US Latin Pop
1986	Promesas	-	-	-	
1986	Esta Noche Vendrás	-	-	-	
1986	OK Mr. Tango	-	-	-	with Mariano Mores
1987	Dos Corazones (with Vicente Fernández)	-	-	-	No. 2 US Regional MX
1987	Me Enloqueces	-	-	-	
1988	Esos Hombres	-	-	-	No. 4 US Latin Pop
1990	Set Me Free	-	-	-	several songs from Esos Hombres sung in English
1991	Cosas del Amor	-	-	-	No. 1 US Latin Pop
1992	It Must Be Him – The Best of Vikki Carr	-	-	-	
1993	Brindo a La Vida, Al Bolero, A Ti	-	-	-	
1994	Recuerdo a Javier Solís	-	35	-	No. 10 US Latin Pop
1996	Emociones	-	-	-	
1998	Con el Mariachi Vargas de Tecalitlán	-	-	-	
1999	Memories, Memorias	-	-	-	from the PBS TV Special
2001	The Vikki Carr Christmas Album	-	-	-	
2012	Viva La Vida	-	49	-	No. 16 US Latin Pop
2014	The First time ever + 9 Bonus track	-	-	-	
2014	Love again: The Lost Columbia Masters	-	-	-	

=== Singles ===
==== 1960s and 1970s ====
- Years represent year of release, not necessarily the chart peak year.

Year	Titles (A-side, B-side) Both sides from same album except where indicated	US 100	US CB	US AC	UK	AUS	Original Source
1962	"I'll Walk the Rest Of The Way" b/w "Beside A Bridge (Along The River Tiber)"	-	-	-	-	-	Non-album tracks
1962	"He's A Rebel" b/w "Be My Love"	115	102	-	-	3	Non-album tracks
1963	"The Rose and Butterfly" b/w "From Nine To Five"	-	-	-	-	-	Non-album tracks
1963	"San Francisco" b/w "Look Again"	-	-	-	-	-	Color Her Great
1963	"Medley: Poor Butterfly/Stay" b/w "The Right Kind Of Man" (Non-album track)	-	-	-	-	-	Discovery!
1964	"Forget You" b/w "Her Little Heart Went To Loveland"	-	-	-	-	-	It Must Be Him
1965	"Busca Ese Camino" b/w "No Seas Asi"	-	-	-	-	-	Non-album tracks
1965	"The Color Of Love" b/w "There Goes My Heart"	-	-	-	-	-	Unforgettable
1965	"Unforgettable" b/w "Theme From Peyton Place"	-	-	-	-	-	Unforgettable
1965	"I Only Have Eyes For You" b/w "None But The Lonely Heart"	-	-	-	-	-	Anatomy Of Love
1966	"The Silencers" b/w "Santiago" (from Unforgettable)	-	-	-	-	-	Non-album track
1966	"Heartaches" b/w "True Love's A Blessing" (Non-album track)	-	-	-	-	-	Anatomy Of Love
1966	"My Heart Reminds Me" b/w "Can I Trust You"	-	127	31	-	-	The Way Of Today!
1966	"Summer Samba (So Nice)" b/w "It Must Be Him" (from It Must Be Him)	-	-	32	-	-	Unforgettable
1966	"Until Today" /	-	-	39	-	-	Non-album track
1966	"Now I Know The Feeling"	-	-	28	-	-	Unforgettable
1967	"Sunshine" b/w "Fly Away" (Non-album track)	-	-	-	-	-	The Very Best Of Vikki Carr
1967	"There I Go" b/w "One More Mountain" (from It Must Be Him); UK release only	-	-	-	50	-	Vikki!
1967	"It Must Be Him" b/w "That's All" (from That's All)	3	5	1	2	1	It Must Be Him
1968	"The Lesson" b/w "One More Mountain" (from It Must Be Him)	34	35	1	-	44	Vikki!
1968	"She'll Be There" /	99	92	13	-	-	Don't Break My Pretty Balloon
1968	"Your Heart is Free Just Like the Wind"	91	-	32	-	-	Don't Break My Pretty Balloon
1968	"Don't Break My Pretty Balloon" b/w "Nothing To Lose"	114	103	7	-	-	Don't Break My Pretty Balloon
1968	"A Dissatisfied Man" b/w "Happy Together" (from For Once In My Life)	-	-	18	-	-	The Ways To Love A Man
1968	"With Pen In Hand"	35	42	6	39	-	For Once In My Life
1969	"Can't Take My Eyes Off You"	-	-	-	-	-	It Must Be Him
1969	"Eternity" b/w "I Will Wait For Love" (Non-album track)	79	69	5	-	-	The Best Of Vikki Carr
1970	"Singing My Song" b/w "Make It Rain"	-	-	30	-	-	Nashville by Carr
1970	"I'll Be Home" b/w "Call My Heart Your Home"	96	117	7	-	-	Vikki Carr's Love Story
1971	"Six Weeks Every Summer (Christmas Every Other Year)" b/w "If You Could Read My Mind"	-	-	28	-	-	Vikki Carr's Love Story
1971	"I Can't Give Back the Love I Feel for You" b/w "I've Never Been A Woman Before" (from Vikki Carr's Love Story)	-	103	-	-	-	Superstar
1971	"I'd Do It All Again" b/w "I'm Gonna Love You"	-	102	39	-	-	Superstar
1972	"The Big Hurt" b/w "Cabaret" (from The First Time Ever (I Saw Your Face))	108	-	31	-	-	Non-album track
1972	"Grande, Grande, Grande" b/w "Y Volvere"	-	-	-	-	-	Los Exitos De Hoy Y De Siempre
1972	"Let the Band Play On" b/w "Reflections"	-	-	-	-	-	Non-album tracks
1973	"Ms. America" b/w "We Didn't Know The Time Of Day"	-	-	-	-	-	Ms. America
1973	"Leave A Little Room" b/w "Have You Heard The News"	-	-	-	-	-	Live At The Greek Theatre
1974	"Sleeping Between Two People" b/w "Borrowed Time" (Non-album track)	-	-	-	-	-	One Hell Of A Woman
1974	"Wind Me Up" b/w "One Hell of a Woman"	-	-	45	-	-	One Hell Of A Woman
1975	"Hoy" b/w "El Pajaro Herido"	-	-	-	-	-	Hoy (Today)
1975	"Puttin' Myself In Your Hands" b/w "I Don't Want A Sometimes Man"	-	-	-	-	-	Non-album tracks

==== 1980s to the present ====
Year	Song	US Latin	Original Source
1980	"Disculpame"	-	Y El Amor
1980	"Abrazame"	-	Y El Amor
1981	"Total"	-	El Retrato del Amor
1982	"Todo Me Gusta de Ti"	-	Vikki Carr
1983	"Ya"	-	Vikki Carr
1983	"Prefiero Amar un Extraño"	-	El Retrato del Amor
1983	"Eso No"	-	El Retrato del Amor
1984	"Comprendeme"	-	A Todos
1985	"Ni Princesa Ni Esclava"	-	Simplemente Mujer
1985	"Atrapame"	-	Simplemente Mujer
1985	"Ni Me Viene Ni Me Va"	-	Simplemente Mujer
1985	"Cantare, Cantaras"	-	Hermanos
1986	"Promesas"	-	Promesas
1986	"Yo Creo en un Mundo de Amor"	-	OK Mr. Tango
1986	"Esta Noche Vendras"	33	Esta Noche Vendras
1986	"Tu Dicha, Tu Calma"	-	Esta Noche Vendras
1986	"Asi es la Vida"	-	Esta Noche Vendras
1987	"Que No Que No"	-	Me Enloqueces
1987	"Fallaste Corazon"	-	Me Enloqueces
1987	"Me Parece Perfecto"	-	Me Enloqueces
1987	"Dos Corazones" (duet with Vicente Fernández)	10	Dos Corazones
1987	"Juntos los Dos"	-	Dos Corazones
1988	"Mala Suerte"	3	Esos Hombres
1988	"Hay Otro en Tu Lugar"	14	Esos Hombres
1988	"Esos Hombres"	37	Esos Hombres
1991	"Cosas del Amor" (duet with Ana Gabriel)	1	Cosas del Amor
1991	"Me Estoy Volviendo Loca"	-	Cosas del Amor
1991	"Con los Brazos Abiertos"	-	Cosas del Amor
1993	"Dejame"	30	Brindo a La Vida, Al Bolero, A Ti
1993	"Nadie"	-	Brindo a La Vida, Al Bolero, A Ti
1993	"Una Mujer"	-	Brindo a La Vida, Al Bolero, A Ti
1994	"Amaneci en Tus Brazos"	-	Recuerdo a Javier Solis
1994	"Sombras"	-	Recuerdo a Javier Solis
1994	"En Mi Viejo San Juan"	-	Recuerdo a Javier Solis
1996	"Emociones"	-	Emociones
1996	"Que No Se Rompa la Noche"	-	Emociones
1998	"No Soy de Piedra"	-	Con El Mariachi Vargas de Tecalitan

== Cultural references ==
- In the Family Guy episode "Total Recall", Peter remarks, "So what? She can name a kind of car. Big whoop, I can do that, too. Vikki. Vikki Carr".
- At a November 12, 1974 state dinner, Don Penny was dancing with Betty Ford while President Gerald Ford was dancing with Vikki Carr. Carr asked the president "What's your favorite Mexican dish?" to which he replied, "You are." Betty Ford was not amused.
- In the 1987 film Moonstruck, Cosmo Castorini is a fan of the singer, often listening to her record "It Must Be Him"; his wife Rose remarks to their daughter Loretta: "Now he's going to play that damn Vikki Carr record, and when he comes to bed he won't touch me."
- In The Nanny season 2 episode "Strange Bedfellows", several nannies celebrate the retirement of Mona, played by Tyne Daly. Bemoaning how little she received after devoting her life to raising the children of other people, Mona says "you give somebody's kids the best years of your life and what do you get? A pat on the back and a couple of stinking Vikki Carr CDs."
- During the first episode of Monty Python's Flying Circus, the credits include John Cleese saying "The final score, Pigs 9, British Bipeds 4. The Pigs go on to face Vikki Carr in the finals."
