= Simplemente Mujer =

Simplemente Mujer: is a 1984 album by Vikki Carr that won a Grammy Award for Best Mexican-American Recording. The album produced a hit single in the song Ni Princesa, Ni Esclava. This was Carr's first recording with mariachi accompaniment. Label: Sony.

== Track listing ==
1. "Ni Princesa, Ni Esclava"
2. "Poquito a Poco"
3. "Ni Me Viene Ni Me Va"
4. "Paloma Negra"
5. "Atrapame"
6. "Nada"
7. "A Mis Cadenas"
8. "Si Nos Dejan"
9. "Amaneci Contigo"
10. "No'Mas Ocho Dias"
