= Paulina Rubio videography =

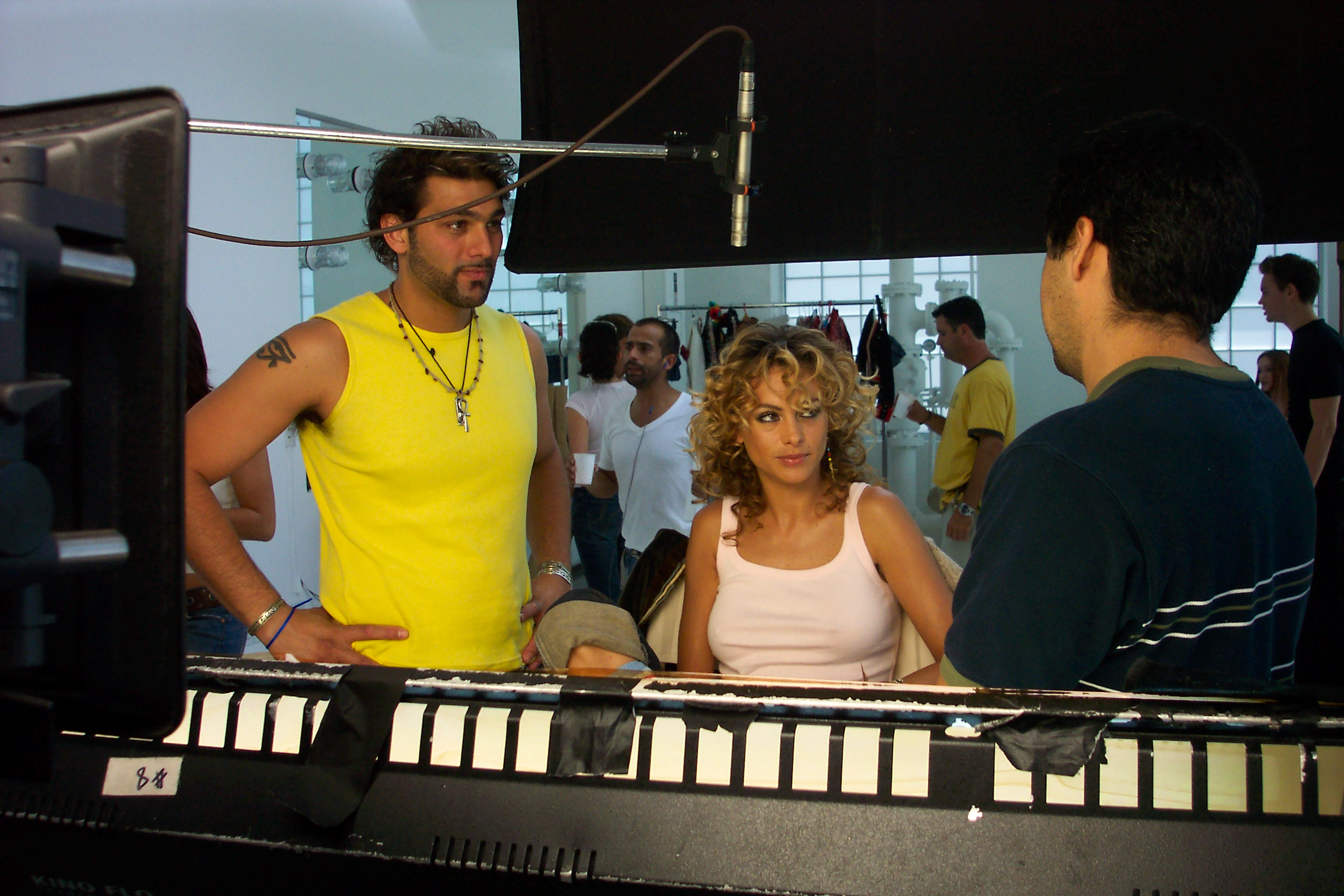
Mexican singer Paulina Rubio and celebrity hair stylist Leonardo Rocco in Miami, Florida.

Mexican entertainer Paulina Rubio has released four video albums and has appeared in fifty-four music videos and three guest appearances. From her debut studio album La Chica Dorada (1992), she released music videos for the singles "Mío" and "Amor De Mujer", all directed by Ángel Flores and released from 1992–93. For the first of these, she earned a nomination ERES Award for Best Video. She followed with three other music videos from her second album 24 Kilates (1993): "Nieva, Nieva", "Él Me Engañó" and "Asunto De Dos", directed by Ángel Flores, Daniel Gruener and Tito Lara, respectively. Rubio's third studio album El Tiempo Es Oro (1995) spawned the singles "Te Daría Mi Vida" and "Nada De Ti", whose music videos was directed by Carlos Marcovich. This was followed by Planeta Paulina's videos: "Siempre Tuya Desde La Raíz", a futuristic video with a concept cosmic and 70's dance, "Solo Por Ti", recorded in a barren desert of Mexico, and "Enamorada", which tells the story of gay couple. The three videos was directed by Tito Lara from 1996-1997.

Rubio's fifth studio album, the eponymous Paulina (2000) produced the music videos in 2000 for "Lo Haré Por Ti" directed by Carlos Somonte, "El Último Adiós" directed by Pedro Torres, and "Y Yo Sigo Aquí" directed by Gustavo Garzón, who she worked for the first time. For the last of these, she earned three nominations MTV Video Music Awards International Viewer's Choice — Latin America and an accolade Ritmo Latino Music Awards for Best Music Video. "Yo No Soy Esa Mujer", "Vive El Verano" and "Tal Vez, Quizá" was produced in 2001. The video for "Yo No Soy Esa Mujer", directed by Gustavo Garzón, earned a nomination Latin Grammy Awards for Best Short Form Music Video. Rubio released four music videos for her sixth studio album Border Girl (2002), including the English and Spanish versions of "I'll Be Right Here (Sexual Lover)", "Don't Say Goodbye", "The One You Love" and "Casanova".

For her seventh studio album Pau-Latina (2004), Rubio released four music videos. "Te Quise Tanto" was directed by Gustavo Garzón, while "Algo Tienes" and "Dame Otro Tequila" were directed by Dago González. The fourth video of the album, "Mía", was directed by Picky Talarico. "Te Quise Tanto" won an accolade at the 2005 Lo Nuestro Awards for Video of the Year. Rubio's eighth album Ananda (2006) spawned music videos for the songs "Ni Una Sola Palabra", "Nada Puede Cambiarme", "Ayúdame", and "Que Me Voy A Quedar", while for her ninth album Gran City Pop released music videos for the songs "Causa Y Efecto", with two different takes; "Ni Rosas Ni Juguetes", other Mr. 305 Remix version features rapper Pitbull of the song, and "Algo De Ti". During that period she worked with directors Paul Boyd, Gabriel Coss and Israel Lugo, Paula Falla, Rudi Dolezal and Jessy Terrero.

The following years, Rubio released her tenth studio album Brava!, with "Me Gustas Tanto" as its lead single. The video was directed by Gustavo López Mañas. In 2012 she reissued her third album as Bravísima! and also released videos for the singles "Me Voy" and "Boys Will Be Boys". This last video was directed by Yasha Malekzad and nominate for Best Music Video at Premios Tu Mundo.

Rubio's eleventh album Deseo (2018) spawned music videos for the songs: "Mi Nuevo Vicio" with the Colombian band Morat; "Si Te Vas" original and reguetton version with Alexis & Fido; "Me Quema"; "Desire (Me Tienes Loquita)" with Venezuelan Nacho; and the power pop ballad "Suave y Sutil". In 2019, she reissu a special edition of the album and produced the music video "Ya No Me Engañas". In all that era, she worked with director Alejandro Pérez and Michel García. The last two music videos of Rubio, released independently, are "Si Supieran" and "De Qué Sirve", directed by Milcho.

In addition to her main music videos, Rubio has collaborated with other artists. Her most outstanding musical duets are: "When You Say Nothing at All (Nada Más Que Hablar)" with Irish artis Ronan Keating, "Nada Fue Un Error" with Coti and Julieta Venegas, "Nena" with Spanish artist Miguel Bosé, "Golpes en el Corazón" with Mexican norteño band Los Tigres del Norte and "Vuelve" with Spanish DJ and singer Juan Magán and rapper DCS.

== Music videos ==
| Associated album | Title | Year | Other performer(s) credited | Director(s) | Ref. |
|---|---|---|---|---|---|
| La Chica Dorada | "Mío" | 1992 | None | Ángel Flores | |
| La Chica Dorada | "Amor De Mujer" | 1993 | None | Ángel Flores | |
| 24 Kilates | "Nieva, Nieva" | 1993 | None | Ángel Flores | |
| 24 Kilates | "Él Me Engañó" | 1994 | None | Daniel Gruener | |
| 24 Kilates | "Asunto De Dos" | 1994 | None | Tito Lara | |
| El Tiempo Es Oro | "Te Daría Mi Vida" | 1995 | Edith González; Raúl De Molina | Carlos Marcovich | |
| El Tiempo Es Oro | "Nada De Ti" | 1995 | None | Carlos Marcovich | |
| Planeta Paulina | "Siempre Tuya Desde La Raíz" | 1996 | None | Fernando De Garay | |
| Planeta Paulina | "Solo Por Ti" | 1996 | Ricardo Emilio Bofill | Fernando De Garay | |
| Planeta Paulina | "Enamorada" | 1997 | None | Fernando De Garay | |
| Paulina | "Lo Haré Por Ti" | 2000 | None | Carlos Somonte | |
| Paulina | "El Último Adiós" | 2000 | None | Pedro Torres | |
| Paulina | "Y Yo Sigo Aquí" | 2000 | None | Gustavo Garzón | |
| Paulina | "Yo No Soy Esa Mujer" | 2001 | Yolanda Andrade; Montserrat Oliver | Gustavo Garzón | |
| Paulina | "Vive El Verano" | 2001 | None | — | |
| Paulina | "Tal Vez, Quizá" | 2001 | None | Gustavo Garzón | |
| Border Girl | "I'll Be Right Here (Sexual Lover)" or "Y Yo Sigo Aquí" (Sexual Lover version) | 2001 | None | Simón Brand | |
| Border Girl | "Don't Say Goodbye" or "Si Tú Te Vas" | 2002 | None | Brothers Strause | |
| Border Girl | "The One You Love" or "Todo Mi Amor" | 2002 | None | Wayne Isham | |
| Border Girl | "Casanova" or "Baila Casanova" | 2002 | None | Simón Brand | |
| Destination, Turn It On and 10 Years of Hits | "When You Say Nothing at All (Nada Más Que Hablar)" | 2003 | Ronan Keating | Xavier Gens | |
| Pau-Latina | "Te Quise Tanto" | 2004 | None | Gustavo Garzón | |
| Pau-Latina | "Algo Tienes" | 2004 | None | Dago González | |
| Pau-Latina | "Dame Otro Tequila" | 2004 | None | Dago González | |
| Pau-Latina | "Mía" | 2005 | None | Picky Talarico | |
| Esta Mañana Y Otros Cuentos | "Nada Fue Un Error" | 2005 | Coti; Julieta Venegas | — | |
| Esta Mañana Y Otros Cuentos | "Otra Vez" | 2005 | Coti | — | |
| Ananda | "Ni Una Sola Palabra" | 2006 | None | Paul Boyd | |
| Ananda | "Nada Puede Cambiarme" | 2007 | Slash; Cloud | Dago González | |
| Papito | "Nena" | 2007 | Miguel Bosé | Diego Postigo | |
| Ananda | "Ayúdame" | 2007 | None | Gabriel Coss and Israel Lugo | |
| Ananda | "Que Me Voy A Quedar" | 2007 | None | Paula Falla | |
| Gran City Pop | "Causa Y Efecto" (Original and "Take Two" version) | 2009 | None | Rudi Dolezal | |
| Gran City Pop | "Ni Rosas Ni Juguetes" | 2009 | None | Jessy Terrero | |
| Gran City Pop | "Ni Rosas Ni Juguetes" (Mr. 305 Remix) | 2009 | Pitbull | Jessy Terrero | |
| Gran City Pop | "Algo De Ti" | 2010 | None | Jessy Terrero | |
| MTV Unplugged: Los Tigres del Norte and Friends | "Golpes En El Corazón" | 2011 | Los Tigres del Norte | — | |
| Brava! | "Me Gustas Tanto" | 2011 | None | Gustavo López Mañas | |
| Bravísima! | "Me Voy" | 2012 | Espinoza Paz | Paula Falla | |
| Bravísima! | "Boys Will Be Boys" (Original and Patrolla Remix) | 2012 | None | Yasha Malekzad | |
| Deseo | "Mi Nuevo Vicio" | 2015 | Morat | — | |
| #TheKingIsBack | "Vuelve" | 2015 | Juan Magán; DCS | Rafael Choclan | |
| Deseo | "Si Te Vas" | 2016 | None | Alejandro Perez | |
| Deseo | "Si Te Vas" (Version Reggueton) | 2016 | Alexis & Fido | Alejandro Perez | |
| Deseo | "Me Quema" | 2016 | None | Alejandro Perez | |
| Deseo | "Desire (Me Tienes Loquita)" | 2018 | Nacho | Alejandro Perez | |
| Deseo | "Suave Y Sutil" | 2018 | None | Mike Garcia | |
| Deseo (Edición Especial) | "Ya No Me Engañas" | 2019 | None | — | |
| N/A | "Si Supieran" | 2019 | None | Milcho | |
| N/A | "De Qué Sirve" | 2019 | None | Milcho | |
| Te Voy A Conquistar | "Tú y Yo" | 2020 | Raymix | Pablo Croce | |
| N/A | "Yo Soy" | 2021 | None | Roxana Baldovin | |
| N/A | "Me Gusta" | 2022 | Maffio | Pedro Vazquez | |
| N/A | "No Es Mi Culpa" | 2023 | None | Pedro Vazquez | |
| N/A | "Propiedad Privada" | 2023 | None | Pedro Vazquez | |

=== Guest appearances ===
| Title | Year | Performer(s) | Description | Ref. |
|---|---|---|---|---|
| "El Último Adiós (The Last Goodbye)" | 2001 | Various artists | Rubio sings with 60 different artists in memory of the 9/11 attacks. | |
| "Somo El Mundo" | 2009 | Artists for Haiti | Perry sings with the Latin supergroup Artists for Haiti, a Spanish language remake of the 1985 hit song "We Are the World". | |
| "Dónde Está El Amor?" | 2016 | The Black Eyed Peas and others artists | Rubio appearances with The Black Eyed Peas in a bilingual Spanish/English version of "Where's the Love?", titled "Dónde Está El Amor?" crediting The Black Eyed Peas featuring El Mundo. | |

== Video albums ==
| Title | Album details |
|---|---|
| La Historia | Released: December 2, 2003; Label: EMI Music; Formats: DVD, VHS |
| Mio: Paulina Y Sus Éxitos | Released: July 18, 2006; Label: EMI Music; Formats: DVD, VHS |
| Celebridades | Released: March, 2008; Label: EMI Music; Format: DVD |
| Gran Pop Hits | Released: September, 2009; Label: EMI; Format: DVD |
