= Deseo Tour =

2019 concert tour by Paulina Rubio

- Tour by Paulina Rubio
- Promotional poster for the tour
- Location: Latin America; Europe; North America
- Associated album: Deseo
- Start date: 8 June 2019
- Legs: 3
- No. of shows: 12

Paulina Rubio concert chronology
- Brava! World Tour (2012); DeseoTour (2019)

The Deseo Tour is the eleventh concert tour and the fourth world tour by Mexican recording artist Paulina Rubio, in support of her eleventh studio album, Deseo (2018). The tour officially began on June 8, 2019, in Santiago, Chile at the Gran Arena Monticelllo, and has confirmed dates in Mexico, Spain and the United States. According to Paulina, the tour is expected to visit more cities both in Europe and in Latin America.

Rubio previously performed at Sparks, NV, Primm, NV, and Indio, CA, in December 2018, to promote the new album, as well as the upcoming North American leg of the tour, scheduled to begin in fall, 2019.

== Set list ==
This set list represents the 8 June 2019 show at the Gran Arena Monticello in Chile. It does not represent all dates throughout the tour.

1. "Mi Nuevo Vicio"
2. "Ni Una Sola Palabra"
3. "Lo Haré Por Ti"
4. "Todo Mi Amor"
5. "Yo No Soy Esa Mujer"
6. "El Último Adiós"
7. "Dame Otro Tequila"
8. "Ni Rosas Ni Juguetes"
9. "Baila Casanova"
10. "Te Quise Tanto"
11. "Suave y Sutil"
12. "Sabor a Miel" (acoustic)
13. "Enamorada" (acoustic)
14. "Mío"
15. "Nada Fue Un Error"
16. "Causa Y Efecto"

Encore

17. "Ya No Me Engañas"
18. "Y Yo Sigo Aquí"

== Tour dates ==
List of concerts, showing date, city, country, venue and opening acts
Date	City	Country	Venue	Attendance
Latin America
4 May 2019	Puebla	Mexico	Palenque de la Feria de Puebla	Cancelled. Replaced by Maribel Guardia.
8 June 2019	Santiago	Chile	Gran Arena Monticelllo	4,000 / 4,000
22 June 2019	Monterrey	Mexico	Showcenter Complex	4,000 / 4,500
Europe
11 July 2019	Madrid	Spain	WiZink Center	15,000/15,550 (Junto a Luis Fonsi, Pablo López y Antonio Orozco)
Latin America
10 August 2019	Zacatlán	Mexico	Zócalo de Zacatlán (Feria de la Manzana)	Free event
North America
12 September 2019	San José	United States	San José Civic Auditorium	1,700/2,850
13 September 2019	Alpine	United States	Viejas Casino	1,200/1,200
14 September 2019	Phoenix	United States	The Van Buren	1,350/1,400
16 September 2019	Los Ángeles	United States	Wiltern	1,850/ 1,850
19 September 2019	Houston	United States	Revention Music Center	Cancelled by the weather from Tropical Storm Imelda.
21 September 2019	McAllen	United States	McAllen Performing Arts Center	1,650/ 1,800
22 September 2019	San Antonio	United States	Aztec Theatre	1,315/ 1,477
25 September 2019	Chicago	United States	Chicago Theatre	3,024/ 3,500
27 September 2019	Brooklyn	United States	Kings Theatre	2,750/ 3,400
29 September 2019	Washington	United States	Warner Theatre	Cancelled
6 December 2019	El Paso	United States	Don Haskins Center	Cancelled. With Ivy Queen.
Europe
19 February 2020	Santa Cruz de Tenerife	Spain	Recinto Ferial de Santa Cruz de Tenerife	
