= Brava! Tour =

2012 concert tour by Paulina Rubio

- Tour by Paulina Rubio
- Associated albums: Brava! and Bravísima!
- Start date: February 2, 2012
- End date: October 27, 2012
- No. of shows: 14

Paulina Rubio concert chronology
- Gran City Pop Tour (2009 - 2010); Brava! Tour (2012); Deseo Tour (2019)

The Brava! Tour, also known as BRAVA!, was the fourth solo concert tour by Mexican singer Paulina Rubio. It was launched in support of her tenth studio album, Brava! (2011) and the reissue entitled Bravísima! (2012). The tour was officially announced in December 2011, initially with Mexico venues confirmed. The show is inspired by spiritual concepts as the Maya calendar, the early traditions of Hinduism chakra and 2012 phenomenon. It was visualized, designed, and produced by boutique production company Zixi.

== Setlist ==
This set list represents the 28 April 2012 show in Monterrey, Mexico. It does not represent all dates throughout the tour.

1. "Me Gustas Tanto"
2. "Lo Haré Por Ti"
3. "Enamorada"
4. "Ni Una Sola Palabra"
5. "Nada Puede Cambiarme"
6. "My Friend, Mi Amigo"
7. "Baila Casanova"
8. "Algo Tienes"
9. "Me Voy"
10. "Hoy Me Toca A Mí"
11. "Yo No Soy Esa Mujer"
12. "Ni Rosas Ni Juguetes"
13. "Que Estuvieras Aquí"
14. "Todo Mi Amor"
15. "El Último Adiós"
16. "Volvamos A Empezar"
17. "Causa Y Efecto"
18. "Sabes Que Te Amo"
19. "Amor De Mujer"
20. "Don't Say Goodbye"
21. "Boys Will Be Boys"
22. "Acelerar"
23. "Nada Fue Un Error"
24. "Mío"

Encore

1. "Te Quise Tanto"
2. "Y Yo Sigo Aquí"

== Tour dates ==
Date	City	Country	Venue	Attendance
North America
February 2, 2012	León	Mexico	Palenque de León	5,000 / 6,700
February 18, 2012	Veracruz	Mexico	Macro Plaza	
March 11, 2012	Huauchinango	Mexico	Teatro del Pueblo	
March 17, 2012	Acapulco	Mexico	Forum de Mundo Imperial	1,500 / 4,000
March 31, 2012	Texcoco	Mexico	Palenque de Texcoco	2,000 / 5,000
April 27, 2012	Mexico City	Mexico	Mexico City Arena	5,000 / 22,000
April 28, 2012	Monterrey	Mexico	Arena Monterrey	7,000 / 11,500
May 3, 2012	Hermosillo	Mexico	Palenque de la Expo Ganadera Sonora	
May 5, 2012	New Orleans	United States	New Orleans Jazz & Heritage Festival	
August 4, 2012	Ensenada	Mexico	Rancho San Gabriel	3,000 / 3,000
September 22, 2012	San Luis Potosí	Mexico	Palenque de San Luis Potosí	
August 27, 2012	Fresnillo	Mexico	Teatro del Pueblo	5,000 / 5,000
September 22, 2012	San Luis Potosí	Mexico	Estadio Alfonso Lastras	
October 27, 2012	Guadalajara	Mexico	Palenque de Guadalajara	3,000 / 5,000
