= Tú y Yo (Raymix and Paulina Rubio song) =

2020 single by Raymix and Paulina Rubio

Single by Raymix and Paulina Rubio
- Released: March 20, 2020
- Genre: Latin pop; Electro-cumbia
- Length: 3:08
- Label: Universal Music Group
- Songwriters: Jorge Luis Chacin; Paulina Rubio; Yasil Marrufo; Edmundo Gómez Moreno
- Producers: Raymix; Sheeqo Beat

Raymix singles chronology
"Te Fuiste" (2020)	"Tú y Yo" (2020)	"Olvídame Tú" (2020)

Paulina Rubio singles chronology
"De Qué Sirve" (2019)	"Tú y Yo" (2020)	"Yo Soy" (2021)

Music video
- Raymix, Paulina Rubio "Tú y Yo" on YouTube

"Tú y Yo" (English: "You and I") is a duet song by Mexican singers Raymix and Paulina Rubio. It was released through Universal Music on March 20, 2020. The song was written by Rubio, Yasil Marrufo, and Edmundo Gómez Moreno; its producers Raymix and Sheeqo Beat and mixed by Armando Ávila.

== Critical reception ==
"Tú Y Yo" is a song from the electrocumbia genre that mixes tropical sounds with synthesizers. The song generated positive reviews from the Mexican press and named the duo "King and Queen of Electrocumbia." The Mexican newspaper Diario Basta! praised Rubio's versatility of working in different musical genres. Josh Mendez of Monitor Latino flatters the duo and said they achieved the "ideal match."

The song won Cumbia Song of the Year - Regional Mexican at the 33rd Lo Nuestro Awards in February, 2021

== Chart performance ==
In Mexico, "Tú y Yo" was a huge hit, reached the top position of the Monitor Latino general chart on June 1, 2020, becoming Rubio's first number-one single in a Monitor Latino list since "Mi Nuevo Vicio" reached the top position of the pop chart in 2015 and her first number one hit in the country's general chart since "Golpes en el Corazón" in 2011. The song reached its peak with an audience of 39.77 million people.

== Music video ==
The song's official video was premiered on YouTube on March 19, 2020. The video, directed by Pablo Croce, filmed in Miami, sees Raymix and Rubio in Miami. The couple portray their first date, alternating between colorful scenes that go from one night eating tacos and playing games at a fair to moments where the two stars are seen dancing together in choreography in a studio.

== Charts ==
=== Weekly charts ===
Chart (2020)	Peak position
Mexico Top 20 (Monitor Latino)	1
Mexican Airplay (Billboard)	1
Mexico Popular Airplay (Billboard)	1
US Latin Airplay (Billboard)	39
US Latin Pop Airplay (Billboard)	9
US Regional Mexican Airplay (Billboard)	16
US Tropical Airplay (Billboard)	3

=== Year-end charts ===
Chart (2020)	Position
Mexico (Monitor Latino)	9
Mexico Pop (Monitor Latino)	81
US Latin Pop Songs (Billboard)	45
US Tropical Airplay Songs (Billboard)	6
US Regional Mexican Airplay Songs (Billboard)	46

== Certifications ==
Region	Certification	Certified units/sales
Mexico (AMPROFON)	Platinum	60,000^{‡}
^{‡} Sales+streaming figures based on certification alone.
