= De Qué Sirve =

Single by Paulina Rubio
- Released: September 13, 2019
- Recorded: 2019
- Genre: Ranchera-pop
- Length: 2:35
- Label: Self-released
- Songwriters: Paulina Rubio; Andrés Castro; Edgar Barrera
- Producer: Paulina Rubio

Paulina Rubio singles chronology
"Si Supieran" (2019)	"De Qué Sirve" (2019)	"Tú y Yo" (2020)

"De Qué Sirve" (What's the Use) is a ranchera-pop song by Mexican singer Paulina Rubio, released to digital retailers and streaming services on September 13, 2019 and was produced by Rubio. It was written by Rubio, Andrés Castro and Edgar Barrera. It was also her last single released as an independent artist before signing with Sony Music Mexico.

Rubio said, "I'm very passionate, and rancheras are very passionate. This is the kind of pop song that opened a lot of gates for my internationality back in the day and all my fans have been asking me to do a song like this."

== Music video ==
The music video for "De Qué Sirve" was directed by Milcho.

== Charts ==
Chart (2019)	Peak position
US Latin Pop Digital Songs Sales (Billboard)	14
