= Si Supieran =

Single by Paulina Rubio
- Released: September 12, 2019
- Recorded: 2019
- Genre: Latin Pop
- Length: 2:53
- Label: Paulina Rubio
- Songwriters: Paulina Rubio, Antonio Cortés “Barullo”, Jesus “Dale Play” Herrera y Oscar Hernández “Oscarito”
- Producer: Jesus “DalePlay” Herrera

Paulina Rubio singles chronology
"Ya No Me Engañas" (2019)	"Si Supieran" (2019)	"De Qué Sirve" (2019)

Music video
- "Si Supieran" on YouTube

"Si Supieran" (English: If They Knew) is a Pop song by Mexican singer Paulina Rubio released to digital retailers and streaming services on September 12, 2019 and was produced by Rubio, making it the first song released independently from her label Universal Music. This is also Rubio's first new single since her 2018's studio album "Deseo". It was written by Rubio herself along with Antonio Cortés “Barullo”, Jesus “Dale Play” Herrera y Oscar Hernández, and produced by Jesus “DalePlay” Herrera.

== Release and recepction ==
Early September, Rubio hyped the release of a new track, eventually revealing the title to be "Si Supieran". The announcement came days after rumors spread that Rubio was dropped by her label and is going through very difficult patches in her personal and professional life.

"Si Supieran" received positive reviews. Adriana Lopez from BELatina wrote that Rubio "disses on her exes and their pathetic attempts to outdo her in the happiness" with a "newly single girl’s anthem" with urban vibes. Mike Wass from Idolator noted that the song "is bursting with the hitmaker’s feisty personality and boasts the kind of outrageous lyrics."

This is Rubio's first song to be released outside of Universal Music, her label of 20 years.

== Music video ==
The music video was released on September 12 and was described by media outlets as 'wild' as Rubio plays the role of a woman celebrating her new life as a bachlerotte while surrounded by masked shirtless men moving and jumping from one bed to another.

== Controversy ==
Si Supieran caused controversy as critics considered the song to be a diss track directed at Rubio's ex-husband Nicolás Vallejo-Nágera and ex-boyfriend Gerardo Bazúa, who both recently had criticized her on social media for allegedly not allowing them to see their children with her.

== Track listing ==
- Digital download
1. "Si Supieran" – 2:53

== Charts ==
=== Weekly charts ===
Chart (2019)	Peak position
Mexico Pop Español Airplay (Billboard)	16
US Latin Pop Airplay (Billboard)	23

=== Year-end charts ===
Chart (2020)	Position
Honduras Pop (Monitor Latino)	93
