= Paulina Rubio filmography =

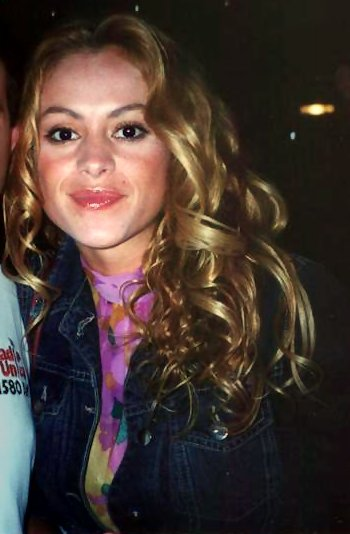
- Paulina Rubio backstage on Fiesta Broadway in July 2000
- Feature films: 3
- Short films: 1
- Telenovelas: 3

This page article documents the acting roles of television and film as well as video game appearances of Mexican singer-actress Paulina Rubio.

== Films ==
Year	Title	Role	Notes
1983	El Día del Compadre	Herself	Film debut
1983	Noche de Terrock y Brujas	Espectro (as Timbiriche)	TV movie
1995	Bésame En La Boca	Claudia Romero	Her first film as solo artist
2003	Nietzsche	Lina	Short film
2006	Pledge This!	Herself	

== Television ==
Year	Title	Role	Notes
1985	Es Navidad Con Timbiriche	Herself	TV short
1988	Pasión y poder	Paulina Montenegro	80 episodes
1992	Baila conmigo	Andrea de la Reguera	100 episodes
1995	El Corazón de Emetéveo	Herself	8 episodes
1995	Pobre niña rica	Alma	Main Role; also performs theme song
1996	Planeta Paulina	Herself	Special TV show
2001	MTV Los 100 Videos + Pop	Herself	Special television show
2004	Los Roldán	Herself	"Episode #1.77" (Season 1, Episode 77)
2004	Cuando éramos niños	Herself	TV movie documentary
2009	Atrévete a soñar	Herself	"Con quién" (Season 1, Episode 114)
2013	La voz kids	Herself	Judge
2013	The X Factor	Herself	Judge
2014	Jane the Virgin	Herself	"Chapter Nine" (Season 1, Episode 9)
2019	El Hormiguero de Vacaciones	Herself	TV short
2021	La suerte de Loli	Herself	"Golpe Bajo" (Season 1, Episode 1)

== Commercials ==
Company	Year	Promoting	Title	Theme song(s)	Region	Ref.
Unilever	1995	Lux	—N/a	"Te Daría Mi Vida"	Colombia	
Grisi	2000	Manzanilla Grisi	—N/a	—N/a	Mexico	
Grupo Caballero	2002	Crema Caballero	—N/a	"Crema Caballero"	Spain	
Keurig Dr Pepper	2002	Dr Pepper	—N/a	"Be You" / "Sé Tú"	United States	
Ferrero	2003	Tic Tac	—N/a	—N/a	Mexico	
Pomalca	2006	Ron Pomalca	—N/a	Algo tienes	Peru	
