= Desire (Me Tienes Loquita) =

Single by Paulina Rubio and Nacho

from the album Deseo
- Released: May 25, 2018
- Recorded: 2017
- Genre: Latin Pop
- Length: 3:16
- Label: Universal Music Spain
- Songwriter: Paulina Rubio · Mauricio Rengifo · Andrés Torres · Miguel Ignacio Mendoza Donatti "Nacho"
- Producers: Andrés Torres & Mauricio Rengifo

Paulina Rubio singles chronology
"Me Quema" (2016)	"Desire (Me Tienes Loquita)" (2018)	"Suave y Sutil" (2018)

Nacho singles chronology
"Olha a Explosão (Remix)" (2018)	"Desire (Me Tienes Loquita)" (2018)	"Reggaeton Ton" (2018)

Music video
- "Paulina Rubio, Nacho - Desire (Me Tienes Loquita)" on YouTube

"Desire (Me Tienes Loquita)" is a song by Mexican singer Paulina Rubio and Venezuelan singer Nacho. The song was released to digital retailers and streaming services by the Spanish division of Universal Music Group on May 25, 2018 as the fourt single from Rubio's eleventh studio album "Deseo". The song was written by Paulina Rubio, Mauricio Rengifo, Andrés Torres, Miguel Ignacio Mendoza Donatti "Nacho", with a production by Andrés Torres and Mauricio Rengifo.

== Music video ==
The music video was filmed on location in La Habana and Miami, it was directed by Cuban director Alejandro Pérez who already worked with Rubio before on her singles "Si Te Vas" and "Me Quema".

== Track listing ==
- Digital download
1. "Desire (Me Tienes Loquita)" – 3:10

== Charts ==
=== Weekly charts ===
Chart (2018)	Peak position
Ecuador (National-Report)	4
Spain Physical/Digital Songs (PROMUSICAE)	15
US Latin Pop Digital Songs Sales (Billboard)	5
Venezuela (National-Report)	47

Chart (2020)	Peak position
Ecuador (National-Report)	100

=== Year-end charts ===
Chart (2019)	Position
Honduras Pop (Monitor Latino)	100
