= Paulina Rubio =

Mexican singer (born 1971)

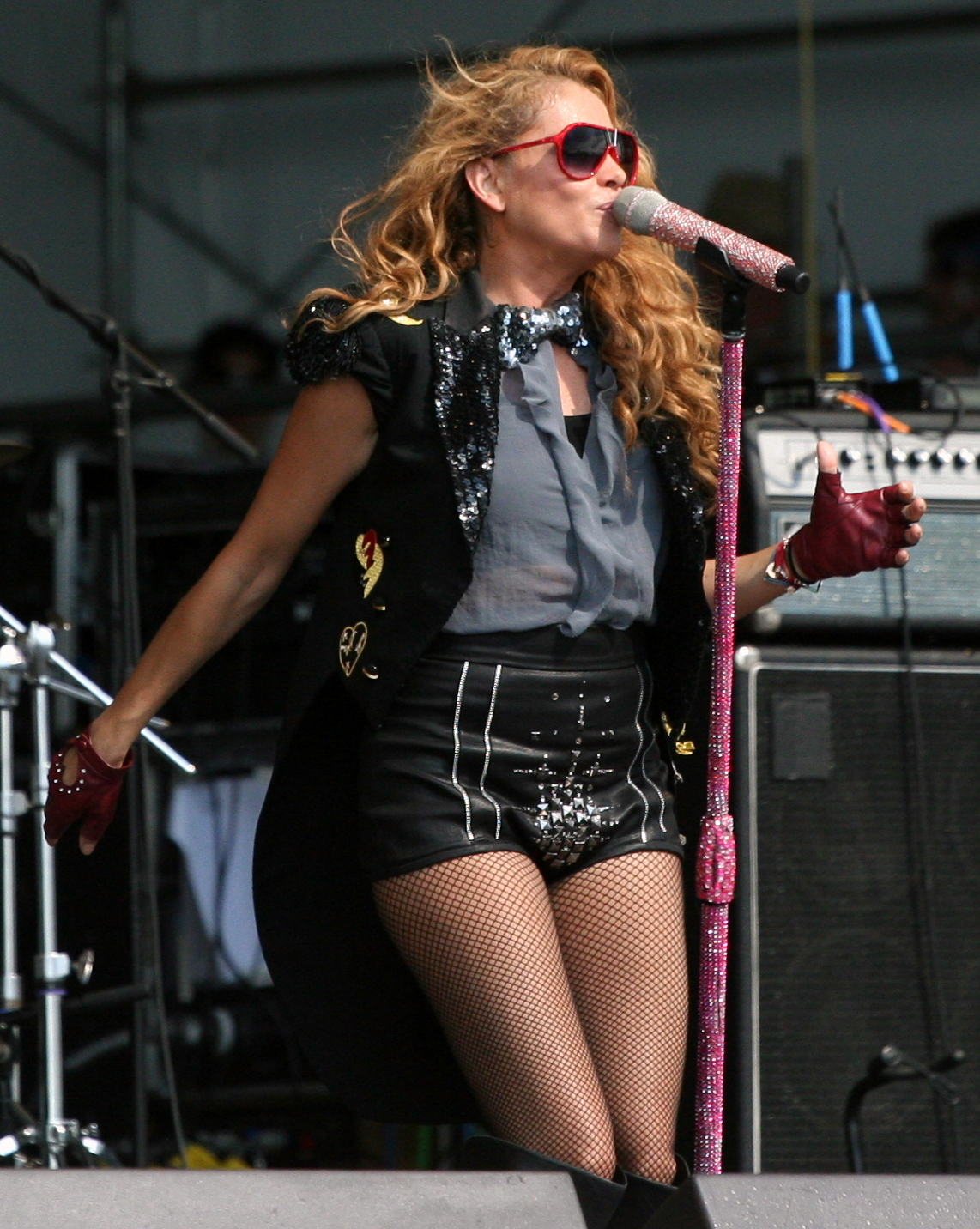
- Rubio in 2012
- Born: Paulina Susana Rubio Dosamantes; 17 June 1971 (age 55); Mexico City, Mexico
- Occupations: Singer; songwriter; model; actress; television personality; businesswoman
- Years active: 1980–present
- Works: Albums; filmography; videography
- Spouse: Nicolás Vallejo-Nágera (m. 2007; div. 2014)
- Partner: Gerardo Bazúa (2012–2016)
- Children: 2
- Parent(s): Susana Dosamantes; Enrique Rubio
- Awards: Full list
- Musical career
- Genres: Latin pop; dance-pop; rock; electronic
- Instruments: Vocals; guitar
- Labels: Melody; EMI Mexico; Universal Mexico; Universal Spain
- Formerly of: Timbiriche
- Website: paulinarubio.com

Paulina Susana Rubio Dosamantes (Latin American Spanish pronunciation: [pawˈlina ˈruβjo]; born 17 June 1971) is a Mexican singer, songwriter and television personality. Referred to as "The Golden Girl", she first achieved recognition as a member of the successful pop group Timbiriche from 1982 through 1991. After leaving Timbiriche, she embarked on a solo career. Rubio has sold over 15 million records, making her one of the best-selling Latin music artists of all time.

Rubio's first two studio albums, La Chica Dorada (1992) and 24 Kilates (1993), were commercial successes and made her EMI Latin's best-selling Mexican female artist. In the mid-1990s, she adopted a more dance and electronic style for her next two albums, El Tiempo Es Oro (1995) and Planeta Paulina (1996), and made her feature film debut with a starring role in Bésame en la Boca (1995).

Following a series of concerts with Timbiriche and ending her contract with EMI Latin, Rubio's career was interrupted before the release of her fifth studio album—and her first with Universal Latino—the homonym Paulina (2000), which is critically referred to as one of her best albums to date. Paulina was an international success and Rubio became the best-selling Latin music artist of the Billboard Year-End in 2001. She returned to the top of the charts again with her sixth and seventh albums, the crossover Border Girl (2002), and the acclaimed Pau-Latina (2004), both of which received positive reviews. Rubio garnered critical praise, including nominations for the Grammy Award and Latin Grammy Award. Her next albums, Ananda (2006) and Gran City Pop (2009), were also critically and commercially successful. She followed it with Brava! (2011), which delved into EDM.

Early in the 2010s, Rubio stood out for participating as a coach in the most important talent shows in America and Spain. In 2012, she served as a coach on the second season of La Voz... Mexico. In 2013; Rubio became a coach on La Voz Kids, and also became a judge on The X Factor USA. In 2019, during the promotion of her eleventh studio album, Deseo (2018), she returned on La Voz... España and La Voz Senior.

Rubio has scored three number one albums on the Billboard Top Latin Albums. Five of Rubio's singles have reached number one on the US Billboard Hot Latin Songs: "Te Quise Tanto", "Dame Otro Tequila", "Ni Una Sola Palabra", "Causa Y Efecto", and "Me Gustas Tanto", making her the fifth best performing female artist on the chart. Other singles, "Mío", "Y Yo Sigo Aquí" and "Don't Say Goodbye", topped the charts in most Hispanic countries. Rubio has earned numerous awards and accolades, including seven Billboard Latin Music Awards; five Lo Nuestro Awards; three MTV Latinoamerica Awards; and two Telehit Awards, including the Trajectory Award; and a special accolade as "Mexican artist with the greatest international projection".

Rubio is regarded as a pop icon and is credited Latin pop era-defining during the 2000s. As one of the most influential female Mexican artists, she was included twice in 2012 and 2013 among the "50 Most Powerful Women in Mexico" by Forbes Mexico. Additionally, she was included in their "Celebrity 100: Twitter's most-followed superstars" list in 2015. In 2008, Univision ranked her among the most powerful Latin celebrities in the United States and as one of the Greatest Latin Artists of All Time by Billboard in 2020. According to a 2021 ranking by YouGov, Rubio is the 26th most popular Latin music artist and the 17th most famous.

== Life and career ==
=== 1971–1981: Early life and career beginnings ===
Paulina Susana Rubio Dosamantes was born on 17 June 1971 in Mexico City. Her father, Enrique Rubio González (1932–2011), was a Spanish-born lawyer; her mother was Susana Dosamantes (1948–2022), a Mexican actress. Dosamantes had lived in Guadalajara, Jalisco until adolescence when she decided to become a film actress, and just before Rubio's birth, she became one of the most popular sex symbols of the 1970s in Mexico. Rubio's younger brother, Enrique Rubio Jr., is an important lawyer and socialite; her half-sister Ana Paola Rubio stays out of the spotlight. Her musical legacy comes from her grandmother and great-grandmother, who were a mezzo-soprano singer and pianist, respectively. Her great-grandparents were originally from Spain and Portugal, and from a very young age she used to spend two or three months a year in Europe, visiting relatives. The rest of the year she resided between Mexico and Los Angeles. As a little girl "grew up in the middle of an artistic world surrounded by cameras, lights and sets".

As Rubio has stated of herself: "I've been famous since I was born", due to the commotion that her birth caused, as she was the daughter of one of the most consecrated actresses in Mexico. According to her mother, Rubio grew up among arts media and the filming locations, while she worked. First Rubio's appearance in a film was the early 1980s, when accompanied by younger brother, she got a minor role in film El Día del Compadre. She also took singing, acting, jazz, painting, and dance lessons while enrolled at what is now the Centro de Educación Artística (CEA) in Mexico in 1980. After two years there, Rubio's parents were contacted by producers Julisa and Guillermo del Bosque to they approval of Rubio's joining on a musical band formed by children from the CEA. They were puzzled by Julissa and Guillermo del Bosque's request. Later, Rubio told them "I did the casting without notifying you." Despite Susana and Enrique's dissatisfaction, they reached an agreement with their daughter to be part of the children's musical band, with the condition that she got "a grade of nine in the school".

=== 1982–1990: Timbiriche ===
Rubio began her singing career as a 9-year-old, when the children's band Timbiriche made its official debut on 30 April 1982 on the Mexican television show Siempre en Domingo, featuring Spanish singer Miguel Bosé as its "artistic godfather". The first song they performed was "Don Diablo" with Bosé. The band's name refers to the a paper-and-pencil game of mathematical structure (known in the United States as dots and boxes), and the idea of naming the musical group was a response to the Spanish children's musical group Parchís, whose name is also inspired by a table game. Timbiriche was initially made up of Mariana Garza, Alix Bauer, Diego Schoening and Rubio, and they were eventually joined by Benny Ibarra and Sasha Sokol. Mexican actress and producer Martha Zavaleta was in charge to recruiting the group of children, who were part of the children's area of the Centro de Educación Artística (CEA). The six children were formed by the major Latin American mass media corporation Televisa with Televisa's producers Victor Hugo O'Farril, Luis de Llano Macedo and María Eugenia "La Gorda" Galindo as part of Timbiriche's team creative.

Timbiriche's first homonym albums (Timbiriche and La Banda Timbiriche) released through Fonovisa Records in 1982 was a success in Mexico. They were known as a children's band and songs like "Somos Amigos", "Hoy Tengo Que Decirte Papá", "Mamá" and "México" was successful on the radio. In 1983 Timbiriche went on their first international tour and released the first live album En Concierto. One of the selected songs was a cover version of the song "Mickey" by Tony Basil. The track was chosen because it was one of the most popular in the tour's performances. En Concierto was gold-certified and marked the debut of Timbiriche's seventh member Erik Rubin. The third studio album, Disco Ruido, released in December 1983, continued with the same concept line of children's songs, but rock-style influences.

In 1984, Timbiriche participated in the musical Vaselina, a Spanish-language adaptation of the American musical Grease; The band record a studio album inspired from the musical, and is known to be the last "child type" record of the group. It was the first act of Rubio on a professional musical theatre, she performed the role of Licha and sang solo a Spanish version of "Freddy, My Love". The band members became teenage idols in Mexico, but for Rubio it implied pressure to look much older than she was. Rubio has stated that at age 13 "I wanted to grow up and look tall, and have big eyelashes" because unlike her groupmates she looked much thinner and shorter. She confessed to having suffered bullying in Timbiriche and felt like "the ugly duckling" of the band.

Timbiriche Rock Show, released on 1 July 1985, marked the "teenage transition" of the band, with lyrics more aimed at teenagers and sounds more pop-rock mainstream. The album contains Spanish-language covers of notable pop hits during the 1980s. It was certified gold and spawned several hit singles, including "Soy un Desastre", "Corro, Vuelo, Me Acelero", "Teléfono" and "Me Plantó", which established the group as a viable act in the music industry. Rubio totally changed her image during that time, leaving her innocent and childish style to a more "rocker" style, and sporting voluminous and large hairdos. When the promotion of Timbiriche Rock Show ended in the summer of 1986, two founding members of Timbiriche left and two new ones entered, which marked a change in the line-up. It was reflected in the album Timbiriche VII, released on 29 June 1987. The pop-rock style record was a massive success in Latin America, selling 1 million copies and becoming one of the best-selling Mexican albums of all time. The record features some of the group's most widely known songs such as "Mírame (Cuestión de Tiempo)" and "Con Todos Menos Conmigo".

When the double-album Timbiriche VIII & IX was released in May 1988, Rubio become as one of the most notorious members and her voice exced in songs such as "Rompecabezas", "Soy Como Soy", "Me Estoy Volviendo Loca" and "Acelerar", which was number one in Mexico charts. The album sold 500,000 copies, and the number-one hit, "Tú Y Yo Somos Uno Mismo", appears in the number two position on the list of the "100 Greatest Songs of the 80's in Spanish", count realized by VH1. In summer 1988, while Timbiriche promotion the albums, Rubio landed a major role in the Televisa telenovela, Pasión y Poder, marks her debut on a TV production. Timbiriche X, the final album of Rubio recorded as a member of Timbiriche was released in early 1990 and despite the fact that she was already the leader of the group, she left the group to focus on a solo career.

=== 1991–1994: Solo career, La Chica Dorada and 24 Kilates ===
During an interview to Mexican TV show Galardon a los Grandes in summer 1991, Rubio said that she would travel to Spain to record her first solo album. She anticipated want to show "fresh music for a very broad market"., and also announced she would film her second telenovela at the end of that year. During that time, Rubio began a relationship with her ex-fellow from Timbiriche, Erik Rubin. The romance received intense attention from the media, since Rubin had recently broken up with Mexican singer Alejandra Guzman, who said in different media "he broke-up with me for she [Rubio]." Guzman released the song "Hey Güera", and the media speculated that the song was about Rubio. Eventually, she confirmed it.

The Televisa's telenovela Baila Conmigo was aired on 30 March 1992. It based in the late 50s and early 60s at the time of "Rock and Roll era". She played the role of Andrea de la Reguera, a rich and capricious girl who was used to having everything at her disposal. Her leading role as an antagonist turned out to be very convincing to the press and audience, earning positive reviews for her performance. The telenovela producer was Luis de Llano, who recruited a cast of youth stars who were just beginning their solo career in music and acting. The success of Baila Conmigo gave the protagonists the possibility of recording a special album and received 9 nominations for the 1993 TVyNovelas Awards, including "Actress Revelation" for Rubio. Also a soundtrack was released under the Fonovisa Records label of ten songs in some Latin American countries. Rubio along with the cast of the telenovela appeared in different television shows to promote the album.

Rubio embarked recording studio sessions in Spain in fall 1991 to early 1992 with the Spanish producer Miguel Blasco and the songwriters José Ramón Flórez and Cesar Valle; The last two began writing songs together. After her returned to Mexico, Rubio promoted the concept of her debut album through marketing in the media and magazines. In June 1992, Rubio signed to a recording contract with Capitol Latin, and her first single was released on 30 August 1992. "Mío" spent several weeks at number one on the Mexican singles charts and became one of the country's best selling single in the 1990s and was certified gold. In the United States, the song reached number three on the Billboard's Hot Latin Tracks chart. Its success resulted in Rubio becoming Timbiriche's first solo singer to enter Billboard charts with great success and repeated the formula at the release of her debut album La Chica Dorada, who released in October 1992, and peak at number three on the Billboard Top Latin Albums chart on the week of 26 June 1993. Rubio made her first television appearance performing on the legendary TV show Siempre en Domingo with Raúl Velasco to publicize his new stage in the music industry. The famous television host commented "it was a great privilege to have presented Paulina as a solo singer".

In the midst of the success, "Mío" was the subject of controversy due the media speculated that the song was a response to "Hey Güera" by Alejandra Guzman. Several media rated the song as part a love triangle. As well, at the beginning her solo career, several media critics Rubio's image style, comparing like a "Madonna wannabe", but with the polarized critics, Rubio was praised as the new youth pop icon in Mexico. La Chica Dorada yielded three top-ten singles on the Billboard Hot Latin Songs, "Mío", "Abriendo Las Puertas Al Amor" and "Amor De Mujer". The album was certified triple gold in Mexico and eventually sold 450,000 copies in there. In March 1993, Rubio received two nominations at the Lo Nuestro Awards for the categories Female Pop Artist and New Pop Artist of the Year. The album promotion culminated with the fourth single "Sabor A Miel" and a promotional tour throughout Mexico and Latin America.

Fall 1993, Paulina Rubio's popularity continued to rise with the release of her second studio album, 24 Kilates. The pop-rock-oriented album sold 150,000 copies only before of its release. It was certified platinum, but did not appear on the Billboard charts. The album's first single, "Nieva, Nieva", topped Mexico top airplay chart and reached number twenty-seven on the Billboard Hot Latin Tracks. Beginning in January 1994, Rubio embarked on a concert tour in Latin America. She formed part of the invited judging panel of Viña del Mar International Song Festival and made a short performance, for which she received the Naranja Award. At that time, she released two more hits, "Él Me Engañó" and "Asunto De Dos", making all three singles from the album peak inside the top twenty on Mexico top airplay chart. "Vuelve Junto A Mí", the by demand-single, was released only in the U.S. and peaked inside the top twenty on the Billboard Hot Latin Tracks.

=== 1995–1997: El Tiempo Es Oro, acting and Planeta Paulina ===
In March 1995, Rubio released her third studio album, El Tiempo Es Oro, and was described as "rhythmic and danceable", but "in the same concept line [of Golden Girl]" than her previous albums. The album managed to sell 300,00 copies worldwide. The lead single, "Te Daría Mi Vida", sold 140,000 copies between Mexico and the United States, subsequent singles "Nada De Ti" and "Hoy Te Dejé De Amar" both reached the top ten airplay in Mexico. The album was her first record released in Spain and Brazil, and Rubio did a performed as a special guest in the Carnival of Santa Cruz de Tenerife. She appeared in different magazines in Spain to become known as a singer, but the media highly publicized her relationship with the Spanish architect and socialite Ricardo Bofill, son of the Ricardo Bofill Taller de Arquitectura's founder. The romance received intense attention from the European media, since Bofill had recently broken up with journalist Chabeli Iglesias (daughter of Spanish singer Julio Iglesias) who was still marrie with him at the time.

Rubio returned to her acting career, and landed her first starring role in the film Bésame en la Boca, released in June 1995. Rubio played Claudia Romero, a rich young girl who dies in an accident while riding her motorcycle, and is later returned to Earth, but in other body, to make amends for her mistakes. Although her acting received critics mixed, the film was a box office success and staying on the Mexican main billboard for six weeks. As well, she starred as one of the main characters on Pobre Niña Rica, her third telenovela, and recorded two versions of the opening song. In August 1995, Rubio guest-starred on the El Corazón de Emeteveo MTV Latino's show.

In 1996, Rubio changed her conventional music style to avant-garde sounds. She co-produced her fourth studio album Planeta Paulina with Marco Flores. The music critics praised it "a sensational album, full of feelings and enthusiasm" inspired in dance-pop, euro-pop, disco, house, electronic and techno styles. Rubio assumed more creative control by writing and co-producing most of the material. The album didn't matched the commercial success of its predecessors, despite it produced four singles: "Siempre Tuya Desde La Raíz", "Solo Por Ti", "Miedo" and "Enamorada". She also recorded English versions of several songs which did not appear on the album, but were included in the remixes or maxi-singles versions of the songs, such as "Open Up Your Hear", "Only For You" and "I'm So In Love". EMI Music declined to release Rubio's first English crossover album, which was supposed to be the English version of the Planeta Paulina album due to weak sales of the Spanish version. Subsequently, she got into a legal battle against the record label for not fulfilling what they had already planned.

Despite the modest success of Planeta Paulina, songs like "Una Historia Más"—a song about HIV/AIDS—and "Enamorada" introduced Rubio to the gay community. In particular the music video for "Enamorada", which showed a homosexual couple and the rainbow flag openly on television. A theme that was still considered a taboo at that time. The album's promotion spread throughout Latin America until 1997.

=== 1998–1999: Timbiriche reunion and Vive el Verano ===
In 1998, Rubio published a calendar, the funds of which went to the Teleton Foundation. The photographs was shot by Mexican photographer José Quintero at locations in Rome, New York, Florence and Mexico. She was in charge of the production, direction and concept of the calendar. During the presentation of the calendar, Rubio said in an interview: "I have to define many things in my professional life, and I am aware of it." Despite the legal battle with EMI Music, she continued to work on new music. For the initial recording session for fifth studio album Rubio worked first with Mexican composer and singer Armando Manzanero, and Mecano's member Nacho Cano.

Rubio met with the original members of Timbiriche in summer 1998, during a performance at the Acapulco Festival. The presentation was received with success and became a historic moment at the festival. After the success obtained, the record label Melody reissues the disc Los Clásicos de Timbiriche, now with the name of Timbiriche Symphonic, accompanied by Mexico City Philharmonic Orchestra. It generated great stir among the followers. The original members realized the magnitude and impact of Timbiriche, so they decided to go on a concert tour. In November 1998 the band initiated a tour developed in Mexico and part of Latin America. Timbiriche reunion established in the Auditorio Nacional a sold-out record of hearing with more than 20 consecutive concerts. On 23 February 1999, a two-disc live album was released through Fonovisa Records titled Timbiriche, El Concierto. The album was a success, and certified gold and platinum for sold 350,000 copies in Mexico.

While continuing with the recording sessions for her fifth studio album, Rubio also hosting the Spanish summer variety show, Vive El Verano, which premiered in July 1999. The production was broadcast by Antena 3. She recorded Richard Daniel Roman's the theme song to the TV show. During the presentation of the television show Rubio said: "Here [in Spain] I am known for other circumstances (her relationship with Ricardo Boffil), but 20 years of professional life guarantee me. With this first job I want to show how far I can go in this world." At the time, she signed a contract with Universal Music Group and Polydor Records to release her new music.

Rubio and her boyfriend Ricardo Bofill explained on the television show Tómbola in April 1999 "they would probably get married". On New Year's Eve 1999, they held an African Rite wedding in Mali, Africa.

=== 2000–2003: Paulina, Border Girl and modeling ===
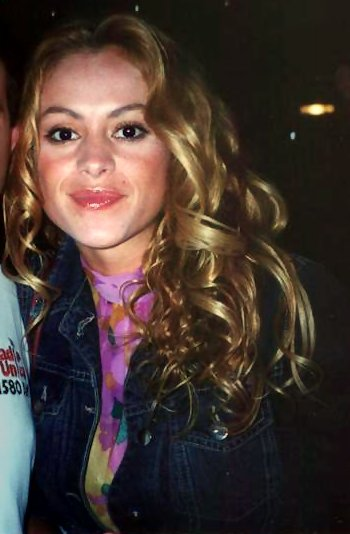
Rubio in 2000

In February 2000, Rubio performed her first single released by Universal Music, "Lo Haré Por Ti", at the Viña del Mar International Song Festival in Chile. The performance was highly criticed by press media, but when the song was released throughout the Americas and Europe, it received positive reviews. Leila Cobo from Billboard praised Rubio's "comeback" and said "[the song is] an edgy, catchy, totally fresh romp." It reached the top 10 in Spain and top 40 in Italy. The music video for "Lo Haré Por Ti" featured a new-Paulina in revealing bikinis and mini skirts, and a hat cowgirl-style which came to be regarded as a mark of style her own.

Rubio released her self-titled fifth studio album, Paulina, on 23 May 2000. She assumed the total creative control, unlike their first three albums with EMI Music, and collaborated with Colombian singer-songwriter and record producer Estéfano to create a "synthesis of the end of the millennium" in a sound that blend through such genres as pop, ranchera, dance, rock, hip-hop, bolero, house and jazz. Rubio "had a very clear idea of what I wanted to achieve and express and Estéfano was a great guide in helping me develop and define that sound." The album garnered critical acclaim, with Steve Huey from Allmusic calling it "one of her best [albums] to date." Paulina was honored with four Latin Grammy Awards nominated—including Album of the Year and Best Female Pop Vocal Album—and was honored for Premios Ondas for "her way of applying spectacularity in Latin rhythms."

Paulina was a commercial success, becoming Rubio's first number-one album on the Billboard Top Latin Albums and Latin Pop Albums. As well, becoming her first album on the US Billboard 200 and Music & Media European Top 100 Albums charts. Paulina became the first Latin pop record by a female Mexican artist to receive a gold standard certification by the Recording Industry Association of America (RIAA), for shipments of 500,000 units in the United States, and it was the best selling Latin album in 2001 there, selling over 1 million copies in the US alone to 2002 and sold more than 3 million copies worldwide. In Mexico, Paulina becomes in one of the best-selling albums all time. Follow-up single from the album, "El Último Adiós", attracted the attention of music critics, who praised ranchera and hip-hop music style fusion. The "ranchera moderna" pop becomes a trademark of Rubio. The third single, "Y Yo Sigo Aquí", reached number one in over 30 countries, becoming Rubio's most successful single to date. The fourth single, the feminist anthem "Yo No Soy Esa Mujer", is considered one of the best songs of the 2000, according to Spin, while Billboard named it one of the 100 greatest songs of 2001. The remaining singles—"Vive El Verano", "Sexi Dance" and "Tal Vez, Quizá"—all peaked in the top ten in Latin America and some Europe's country.

Rubio's look and style of dressing that showed in her music videos, and her performances influenced young girls and women. Her style became one of the female fashion trends of the 2000s in Latin America. In September 2001, she co-headlining with the Spanish group Café Quijano for the QDQ Tour that toured eight cities in Spain. She then embarked on a tour across North America.

In early-2002, Rubio comeback at the Viña del Mar International Song Festival in Chile, and made a polemic performance. She said Antonio Vodanovic (festival entertainer) refused to award him the Antorcha de Plata despite the public's request. Rubio accused him of being macho and explained "I don't need anything material, but the 'Antorcha' means the burning flame." Also, performed at the Festivalbar and Festival di Sanremo in Italy; Top of the Pops in United Kingdom ang Germany; Hit Machine in Paris and Wango Tango in U.S. EMI Music released two successful greatest-hits albums compilations, Top Hits and I'm So in Love: Grandes Éxitos. The albums entered on the Billboard Top Latin Albums charts and Spanish Albums charts.

"Don't Say Goodbye"
Sample of "Don't Say Goodbye". The dance-pop song was critically acclaimed.

Rubio released her sixth studio album, Border Girl, in her birthday number 31. The album her first foray into English-language pop. Like its predecessor, received acclaim from critics. Jose F. Promis from AllMusic called it "one of the most interesting and international pop albums of 2002." In the U.S., Border Girl debuted at number eleven on the Billboard 200 albums chart, making her highest-charting album in the region, and was certified Gold by the Recording Industry Association of America (RIAA) for shipments of 500,000 copies in the country. The first single "Don't Say Goodbye" peaked at number forty-one position on the Billboard Hot 100 and number nine on Canadian Singles Chart, while the Spanish version reached number five on the Hot Latin Tracks. The accompanying music video (directed by The Brothers Strause) featured the singer riding a futuristic motorcycle while look infamous leather costume red. It cost of $1 million, which makes it the first Mexican to invest that amount in a music video. "The One You Love" was released as the second single reaching number ninety-seven on the Hot 100 while the Spanish version, "Todo Mi Amor", reached number five on the Hot Latin Tracks chart, becoming her second top five hit from the album. Also, the Spanish version of the single "Casanova" reached number thirty-seven on the Hot Latin Tracks. Rubio she co-headlined the North America dates of Don't Turn Off the Lights Tour fellow Latin pop star Enrique Iglesias. She was honored as the "Mexican Artist with Greatest International Projection" at the Premios Oye! in Mexico, and the Houston, Texas radio station 104.1 KRBE declared 21 June "Paulina Day" in Houston.

As modeling role, Rubio debuted at the fashion show for Argentinian designer Jorge Ibáñez in Mexico. In late-2002, she signed Elite Model Management of New York, a modeling agency which is fairly prestigious. Annabel Aucoin, then promoter of agency, said "Paulina is the only Mexican singer who is with us and, in truth, she is an international celebrity [...] But she also has the beauty and the personality to be in our celebrity division." For spring 2003 Bacelona's Fashion Week (Pasarela Gaudí), Rubio walk at the runways for Totón Comella collection for TCN. She also return her host role at the beauty pageant Miss Spain 2003. Rubio provided guest vocals on Ronan Keating' re-recorded single "When You Say Nothing at All". The song was re-title "When You Say Nothing at All (Nada Más Que Hablar)" due Rubio's Spanish sing, and released in March 2003.

=== 2004–2008: Pau-Latina, Ananda, marriage, and controversies ===
After Rubio broke up with Ricardo Bofill in early 2004, she began dating Mexican actor José María Torre. During that time, she released her seventh studio album, Pau-Latina. The "futuristic folklore" record included contributions from Emilio Estefan, Chris Rodríguez, Sergio George, Gaitanes, Marco Antonio Solís, Coti, Jorge Villamizar, Los Tetas, and Reyli. Rubio explained that she "wanted to do it step by step and very calmly; hence the album title" which means "Latin Peace" in Catalan. Besides that it is a play on words: "Pau", as all her friends call her, and "Latina", in honor of her roots. Sarah Bardeen from Rapsody felt that Pau-Latina is "brilliant" specially for "Rubio incorporates elements of rap, reggaeton, flamenco and ranchera while maintaining her own consistently feathery pop sensibility" while Matt Cibula from PopMatters included it in her list of the "best however-many-it-ends-up-being albums of 2004." It became her second album to debut at the top of the Top Latin Albums chart, and peaked at number 105 on the Billboard 200. Pau-Latina won several awards—including Billboard Latin Music Awards and Lo Nuestro Awards—and was nominated for a Latin Grammy for Best Pop Female Vocal Album, and nominated for a Grammy Award for Best Latin Pop Vocal Album.

"Te Quise Tanto" was released as the lead single from Pau-Latina, and reached number one on the Billboard Hot Latin Songs; became her biggest single to date, and her first single to reach the top position on the chart. "Algo Tienes" followed as the second single, peaked at number one on the Latin Pop Airplay. "Dame Otro Tequila" was released as the album's third single, and became her second number-one single on the Hot Latin Songs. In 2005, "Mía" and "Alma En Libertad" followed as the album's fourth and fifth singles, and reached number eight and number 39 on the Hot Latin Songs, respectively. Rubio's third headlining tour, the Pau-Latina Tour, began in September 2004 and concluded in June 2005. She also performed at the Viña del Mar International Song Festival in Chile, where finally won the Antorcha de Plata at the request of the public, and after three performances in the past years. Her performance received polarized critics from several media. Some journalists argue that due to the Rubio's feminist speech when she interpreted "Yo No Soy Esa Mujer", she got the Antorcha de Plata.

Rubio gave a provocative performance as host at the 2004 MTV Video Music Awards Latinoamérica. In a sarcastic speech during the ceremony, she said "There are many people who believe that I only want to provoke conservatives [...] Because I am conservative, very conservative" and immediately opened the back of her little mini dress exposing her butt, and showing just a red thong t-back. The incident was highly publicized. Several media assumed it was a response by Rubio to those of conservative ideology in Mexico due few months before, government leaders in Queretaro, censored a Rubio's spectacular where she posing completely naked on a white horse and wearing only red sandals from the Andrea, brand whom she had an endorsement. The Chilean press cited the moment as "[Rubio] claiming women's underwear".

Some of Rubio's important TV performances during Pau-Latina era attracted media attention due her fashion style, especially her provocative skirts tutu-style. Rubio and her personal designer released merchandising inspired by her skirts through her website, and title it "Tutu Pau". She received the Voz del Momento award at the 2004 Premios Juventud, and also was named People en Español''s 2005 Star of the Year. At that time, Rubio appeared on two singles from Coti's album, Esta Mañana Y Otros Cuentos; she was featured on a duet with Coti, "Otra Vez", and on a collaboration with Coti and Julieta Venegas entitled "Nada Fue Un Error", it last was a success in Spain and Latin America. After her relationship with José María Torre ended in early 2005, just a few months after, Rubio began dating her future husband Spanish entrepreneur Nicolás "Colate" Vallejo-Nájera. The couple became engaged in November 2006.

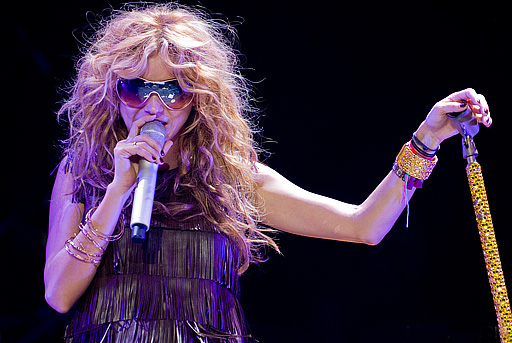
Rubio performing on the ASICS Music Festival in Barcelona, 2007

In July 2006, Rubio released "Ni Una Sola Palabra", the lead single from her eighth studio album, Ananda. It became her third number one single on the U.S. Billboard Hot Latin Songs (entered on the Billboard Hot 100 chart) and reached the atop on iTunes' digital song sales chart in Spain, earning eventually it was certified triple platinum by the Productores de Música de España (PROMUSICAE). The second and third single released from the album were "Nada Puede Cambiarme" and "Ayúdame", and "Nada Puede Cambiarme" received certified gold in Spain for digital downloads. Other singles released from the album include "Que Me Voy A Quedar" and the digital single"Me Siento Mucho Más Fuerte Sin Tu Amor".

Ananda was released on 19 September 2006. Album's title is a Sanskrit word which in English means "Happiness", name of Rubio's Miami home, where Ananda was recorded. The album reflected a change in her spiritual perception and image. On Ananda, Rubio worked with new producers as Cachorro López, Toy Hernández, Áureo Baqueiro, Ric Wake, Tricky Stewart and Gustavo Santaolalla at the Rubio's home studio in Miami, Florida. The album retakes rock-pop style for Rubio, and incorporates genres such as Latin pop, dance-pop and folk. Ananda garnered critical acclaim, with Jason Birchmeier from Allmusic calling it "an exceptionally solid collection of 13 would-be hits, each interesting and pleasing in its own fashion." The album reached at number one on the Billboard Top Latin Albums and Latin Pop Albums. Also reached at number forty-four on the Billboard 200. The album earned several accolades, including two awards at the 2007 Latin Billboard Music Awards. It was a success in Nordic countries. Rubio performed at the Nobel Peace Prize Concert in Oslo, Norway to honor the 2006 Nobel Peace Prize recipient, Muhammad Yunus.

In early 2007, Rubio recorded the song "Nena" as a duet with singer Miguel Bosé, from his album Papito. It was also nominated for Record of the Year at the 8th Annual Latin Grammys. Rubio embarked on her Amor, Luz Y Sonido tour February to September 2007. It was her longest tour in Spain. While promoting her tour, she married her then fiancé Nicolás "Colate" Vallejo-Najera in Xcaret, Mexico. The wedding received several media coverage. It was considered "the wedding of the year" and they covered the May 2007 issue of ¡Hola! magazine.

In October 2007, the Spanish edition of Cosmopolitan magazine featured her apparently naked underneath a red, white, and green sheet. A government probe was open about whether or not she had desecrated the Mexican flag. The Secretariat of the Interior said she may have violated an article in the National Flag, Shield and Anthem Law, which states that "private individuals will give the appropriate respect to the national symbol and handle it with care". The offense can be punished by fines ranging from $45,000 to $50,000 MXN (Mexican pesos) and jail time of up to 36 hours. However, in a published report, her mother said that Rubio did not authorize such photos. Finally, in February 2008, the Mexican Government imposed a fine on Rubio "considering that she has disrespected the patriotic symbols". In the meantime, Rubio participated in a mega benefit concert event by ALAS Foundation, developed simultaneously in Mexico and Argentina. She performed in Buenos Aires in front of 180,000 people, along with other Latin artists.

=== 2009–2010: Gran City Pop and motherhood ===
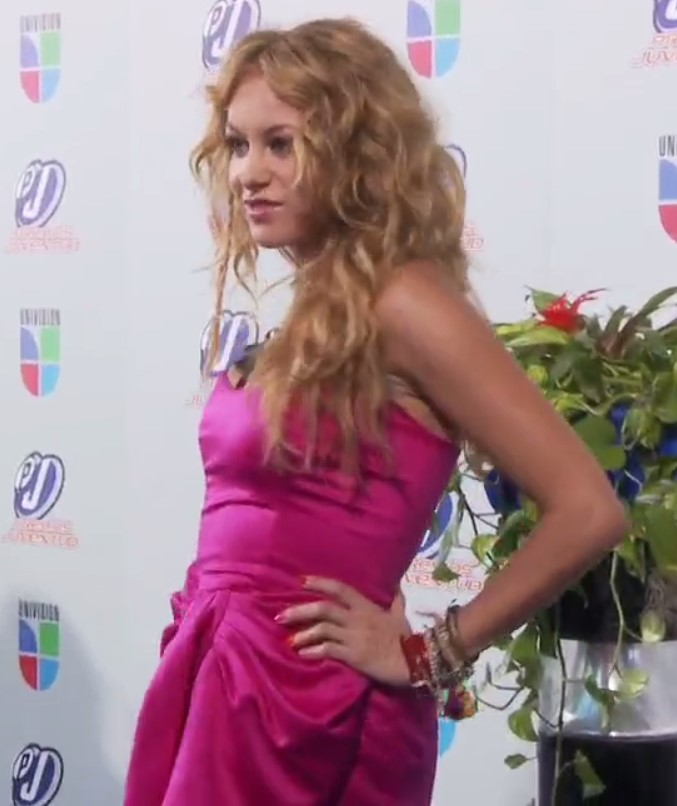
Rubio at Premios Juventud red carpet in July 2009

Rubio performed the song "Causa y Efecto" at the 2009 Latin Billboard Music Awards on 23 April. It was released as the lead single from her ninth studio album, Gran City Pop. The Rubio's comeback single atop on the Billboard Hot Latin Songs for 5 consecutive weeks; becoming her fourth number-one single on the list of her career. As well, "Causa Y Efecto" was number one on the Mexican Monitor Latino Chart and Spanish Airplay Chart, where certified platinum. Rubio released Gran City Pop, on 23 June 2009. The album is a concept album of a utopian city, "very earthy and very organic where everything is an amalgam; a mixture that allows to unite instead of divide", and was inspired by Miami, Mexico and Madrid. Mussically, Gran City Pop embrace from pop rock and dance pop, containing influences of Latin styles, electropop, eurodisco and arena rock. The songs were autobiographical in nature and saw Rubio collaborating as songwriter with Coti, Fernando Montesinos, Rafael Vergara, and went back to work with Estefano, after almost ten years of working with him on Paulina. Rubio developed as the album's executive producer, along with producers such as Cachorro López, Lester Mendez and Chris Rodriguez.

Gran City Pop debuted at number two on the Billboard Latin Albums and number one on the Latin Pop Albums; and debuted at number forty four on the Billboard 200. Dan Kimpel from Broadcast Music, Inc. complimented the sound of the album, while Jesús Rodríguez de El País panned as a "party and romance tailor's drawer; pop rhythms, Latin airs, rock guitars, rancheras and tequila, melodic song and disco sound." Gran City Pop received certified gold and platinum in different regions for shipments of over 300,000 copies worldwide after one month of release. It received a nomination at the 52nd Annual Grammy Awards for Best Latin Pop Album, and at the Lo Nuestro Awards for Pop Album of the Year.

"Ni Rosas Ni Juguetes", described as being ranchera/pop with a hip hop beat (like "El Último Adiós"), was released as the second single from Gran City Pop on 17 August 2009. It reached top ten the Billboard Hot Latin Songs; as well in Mexico and Spain. Rubio performing the song in a medley with Cobra Starship's song "Good Girls Go Bad", singing along with American dance-pop band at the Los Premios MTV Latinoamérica 2009. The performing won for Best Live Performance at "Los Premios 2009", voted by the public; the same night Rubio won the award for Best Solo Artist. An official remix of "Ni Rosas Ni Juguetes" was realized by Pitbull, and was released to mainstream radio. The song made a crossover for other music markets, with a collaboration for the banda genre with Jenni Rivera; and another for format EDM with Juan Magán. The final single from the album, "Algo De Ti", was released on 22 March 2010 in Spain and on 19 May 2010 in the U.S. However, Universal Music Latino later declined to continue promotion of the song to radio outlets, as a result it was unable to chart; instead released a remixes series by Junior Caldera and Juan Magán to impact the EDM market.

Rubio embarked on her Gran City Pop Tour ran from September 2009 to August 2010. While offering a series of concerts in Spain in May 2010, she and her husband Nicolás "Colate" Vallejo-Nájera announced exclusively to ¡Hola! that they were expecting their first child. "I'm going to be a mom... Life has a new meaning. They have just confirmed the best news of our lives and by the end of the year we are going to be parents," Rubio told the publication. Rubio stated that if the child was a boy, he would be named after his father, Nicolás. If it was a girl, she would be named after Rubio's great-grandmother, Micaela. On 15 September 2010 Paulina announced on her Twitter page that she was expecting a boy. On 14 November 2010, Rubio and her husband welcomed their first child, a boy named Andrea Nicolás Vallejo-Nájera Rubio in Miami, Florida. Rubio had planned to have a water birth at home, but she was rushed to the hospital and spent the weekend with doctors working to stabilize the health of the baby. Hospital staff tried to send Rubio home so that she could realize her dream of a natural home birth, but the complications led her medical team to schedule a c-section.

=== 2011–2012: Brava!, and La Voz ===
On 11 January 2011, Rubio's father, Enrique Rubio González, died at 67 in a Mexico City hospital. A consensus of various news sources attributed his death to kidney failure. In February 2011, was confirmed that she would participate on MTV Unplugged: Los Tigres del Norte and Friends, a live album by Los Tigres del Norte. Rubio and the norteño band performed "Golpes en el Corazón", which was released as the first single off the album on 19 April 2011. It became in a successful in Mexico, peaking atop the Monitor Latino general charts and the Mexican Airplay Chart from Billboard International. At the time, she was also featured in Gloria Trevi's album, Gloria, on the track "No Al Alguacil" that expected as the third single off Trevi's album, but failed to get a released.

Rubio resumed recording sessions on her tenth studio album. She announced that she wanted to do a Spanglish album is that she wanted to mix the language of her home Mexico and the United States. "I grew up in Mexico, but I've always been between the United States and my country. This is all done with a wink and a nod to 'Spanglish' culture, which continues to grow and has a foot in both worlds." She stated that this album would be different from all her other albums because being a mother and the death of her father had inspired her tremendously. She also said that 70% of the album's songs would be in Spanish, while only 30% in English.

On 15 November 2011, Rubio released her tenth studio album, Brava!, and saw collaboration with various producers, including RedOne and Julio Reyes The album entered within the top five on Mexico and United States charts, and sold 100,000 copies in these regions. The album's lead single, "Me Gustas Tanto", peaked at number one at the Billboard Hot Latin Songs, becoming Rubio's fifth number-one single on the chart and making her the five Latin female artist in history to have more number one singles, after Gloria Estefan, Shakira, Selena, and Ana Gabriel. The second single "Me voy" was re-worked version featuring the Mexican singer-songwriter Espinoza Paz, and released on 14 February 2012, while the promotional single "Heat Of The Night" reached number sixteen on the Billboard Dance Club Songs chart.

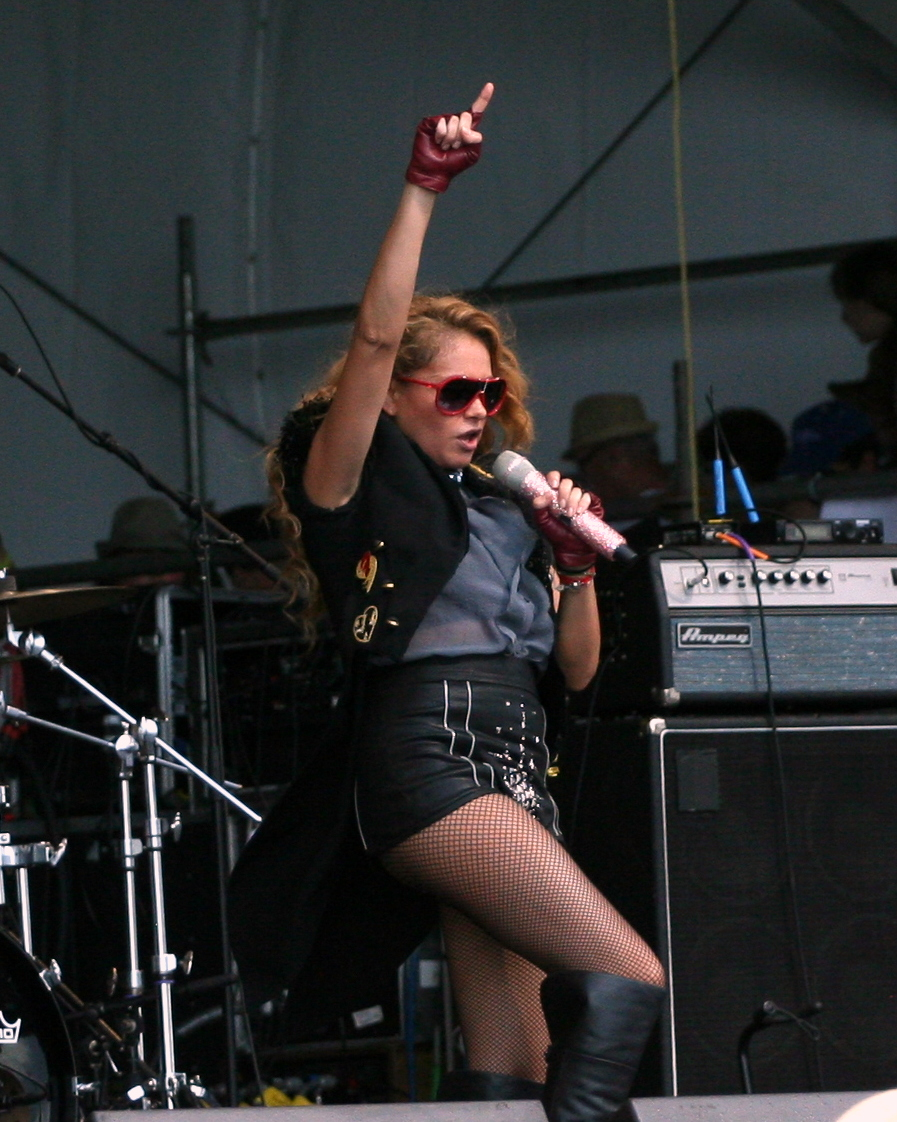
Rubio in 2012

The following months, Rubio released Bravísima!, a new deluxe edition of Brava!, which includes new songs, and the previously released single "Boys Will Be Boys". The first English-language Rubio's song since "Don't Say Goodbye" was acclamaid as the "hymn of the summer", and commercially was a success in Spain, where was certified gold. The music video for the song was directed by Yasha Malekzad and received positive reviews. Latin Magazine mentioned it as one of the 30 sexiest music videos of all time. The albums was mostly promoted by Brava! Tour, which lasted from February to October 2012. Rubio performed at the Telehit Awards where she was recognized for her twenty-year career as a solo artist with an award.

In March 2012, Rubio's husband Nicolás "Colate" Vallejo-Nájera confirmed their breakup, disclosing that they had been living apart for four months. Colate filed for divorce from Rubio, citing irreconcilable differences. Rubio and Colate reached a legal agreement to share custody of their son, Andrea Nicolás. During that time, she had started a relationship with the contestant of La Voz... México, Gerardo Bazúa, whom she met while serving as a coach in the second season of the competition television series. During the second season of La Voz... México', she participated as a coach along with Miguel Bosé, Jenni Rivera, and Beto Cuevas.

=== 2013–2017: La Voz Kids, The X Factor USA, and divorce court battle ===
In early 2013, Rubio was included on a remix of Juan Magan's song "Mal De Amores". In the same time, Rubio was one of the three coaches for La Voz Kids, the singing competition for kids from seven to fourteen years old on Telemundo. Although she was initially slated to return for the series' second season, Telemundo announced that Rubio not return. She then sued Telemundo for alleged breach of contract. While serving as a coach at La Voz Kids, Rubio appeared in court hearings Miami-Dade Clerk of Courts to meet at court celebrations with her former partner, Nicolás "Colate" Vallejo-Nájera. At first, Rubio claimed that he did not want to share 50/50 joint custody with Colate because of his mismanagement as a parent, but the judge did not relent.

In May 2013, Rubio was hired to replace Britney Spears as a judge for the third season of the USA show of The X Factor, joining Simon Cowell, Demi Lovato, and fellow new judge Kelly Rowland, who replaced L.A. Reid. She became the first Mexican artist judge on an American singing competition series. Rubio mentored the Boys category; her final contestant, Carlito Olivero, was becoming the last contestant eliminated in the competition of the season. Universal Music released to fall 2013 the first compilation album by Rubio, Pau Factor, spanning greatest hits from her 2000 homonym album to album project Bravísima! The album was poorly promoted, but managed to reach number thirty-seven on the Billboard Top Latin Albums, and number thirteen on the Latin Pop Albums.

Rubio first teased a new single on Valentine's Day in 2014, playing a "La Bamba"-esque song "Cuanto Te Quiero" with producers in the studio. Even though she performed it live several times, the song's release as the album lead single was cancelled. In an exclusive interview with Mario Lopez in June, Rubio spoke for the first time publicly about his legal divorce battle with Colate Vallejo-Nájera, and revealed, "I'm not divorced yet. It's been hard to struggle for so long to sign the papers. It's been hard for the baby, but hopefully things will be more quiet and more in balance." Finally, the divorce was "made official" in November 2014, according to a Miami-Dade County Family Court judge, who replied to Rubio, "their marriage has been dissolved". In the statement at a hearing, she asserted that "Colate" refused to sign the divorce because she demanded an increase in the pension, and it was stipulated that Rubio would give Colate a three-year pension of $6,750 per month. In December, Rubio guest starred as a fictionalized version of herself on The CW series, Jane the Virgin.

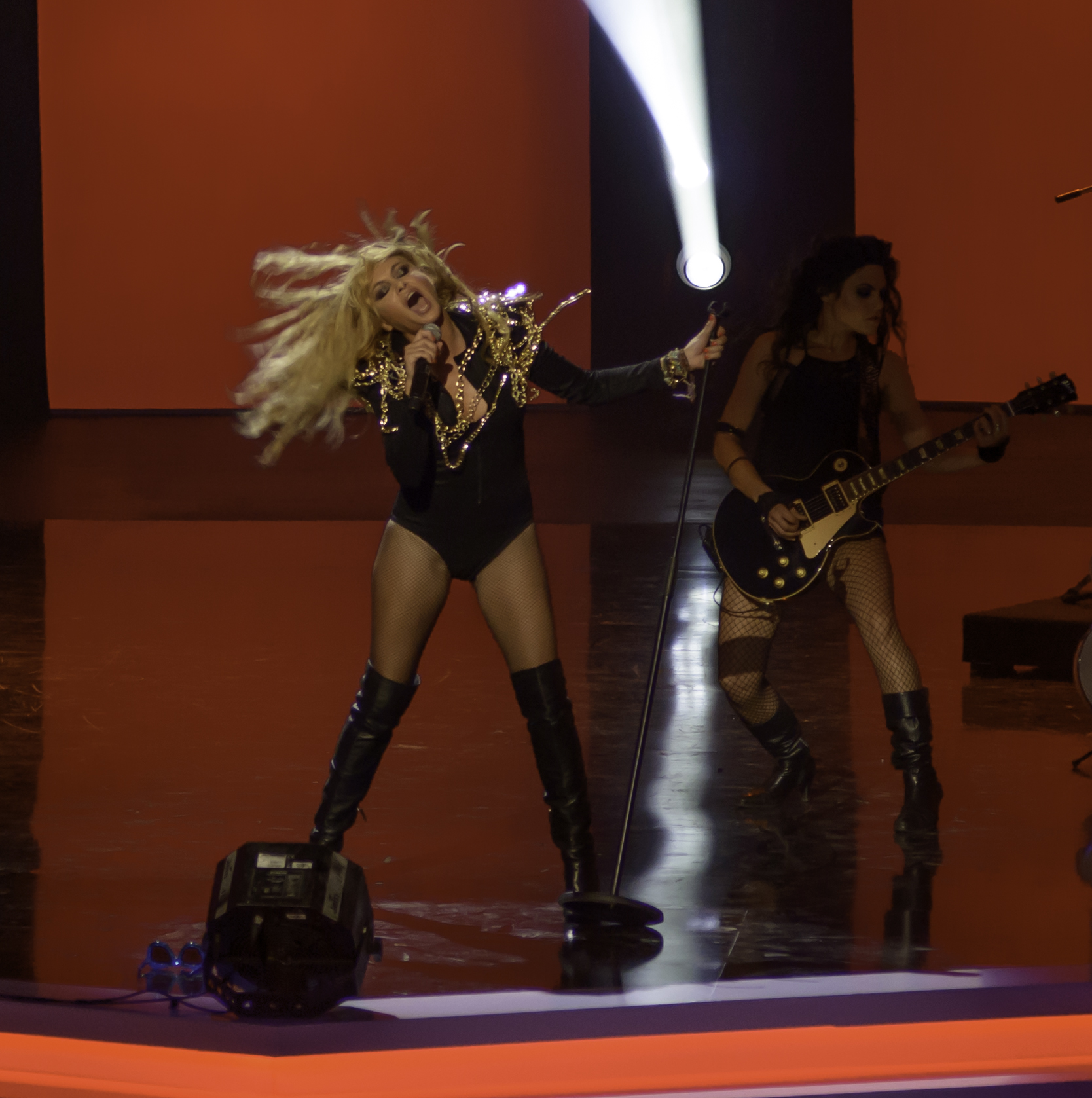
Rubio performing on 24 July 2016

In January 2015, Rubio released a new single, "Mi Nuevo Vicio" featuring Colombian group Morat. It reached number one in Spain, and attained a double platinum certification for sales of 80,000 copies, making her the Mexican female artist with more streams on Spotify. Although "Mi Nuevo Vicio" was her comeback single, and was a success in Latin America, it took Universal Music to give the green light to the singer's eleventh studio album. Rubio's legal battle with "Collate" continued in June 2015, when he sued her for non-payment of three months of maintenance, which would break the divorce regulatory agreement they reached in the Miami courts. That same summer, Rubio co-wrote and collaborated on Juan Magan's song "Vuelve", featuring DCS. The song was an unprecedented success in Spain, placing it as number one on Los 40 Principales, while in Mexico it was certified triple platinum. In December 2015, Rubio announced in an exclusive for ¡Hola! that she was expecting her second child, her first with her partner Gerado Bazúa. The publication was accompanied by photographs of the couple with Rubio's son, Andrea Nicolás.

Following the release of her single "Si Te Vas" in early 2016, Rubio featured in an exclusive for ¡Hola! with her second child, Eros Rubio Bazúa, who was born on 5 March 2016. She revealed, "I am writing a new chapter of my life in which family is the most important thing." She stayed away from the stage and media attention for two months, until she reappeared at the Latin Billboard Music Awards. She also performed at the 3rd Platino Awards, were announced the name of her new single, "Me Quema". The song was released on 11 November, tentatively as the first single from Rubio's eleventh studio album, but again Universal Music postponed the release of the album. Rubio performed "Me Quema" at the Telehit Awards 2016 for the first time; her setlist consisted in perform other three hits, and when finished her performance she confused Telehit with MTV. The moment went viral on social media, and was widely criticized by the media. That autumn, it was confirmed that Rubio had ended her relationship with Gerardo Bazúa.

In anticipation of releasing a new album, Rubio presented a tour of some cities in Mexico in 2017. Universal Music once again cancelled the release date of the singer's eleventh album.

=== 2018–2020: Deseo, La Voz Spain, departure from Universal Music, and viral video ===
"Desire (Me Tienes Loquita)" featuring Nacho, the lead single from her eleventh studio album, was released on 25 May 2018. Its second single "Suave Y Sutil" followed four months later. The album, titled Deseo, was released on 14 September 2018. The album received mixed reviews, and debuted at number thirteen on the Billboard Latin Pop Albums. Rubio further promoted the album with a reissue. These "special edition" were followed by the single "Ya No Me Engañas" in April 2019. Additionally she promoted Deseo in several TV shows and specials concerts. The album was certified gold in Chile.

Rubio returned to the talents shows as a judge and coach in January 2019 in the sixth season of Spanish version of La Voz; her final act, Ángel Cortés, was finished 4th in the competition of the season. Rubio distinguished herself by being the only woman on the coaching team. She was considered a right guess in La Voz, because the ranking of Antena 3's production rose considerably compared to recent seasons. The newspaper of La Razón mentioned "[Rubio] is the face that most contrasts with the rest of the members of the jury of the program. The moost international character gives great force to the evaluations and makes 'La Voz' de España have much more travel outside of our country." In the following months, she continued as a coach in La Voz Senior, a version for people over 60 who are facing a new opportunity in their lives in which music has always been present.

Rubio also embarked on Deseo Tour, which began in June and ended in December 2019. After releasing her promotional single "Si Supieran", several media announced that Rubio and his 20-year-old record label, Universal Music, had signed a mutual employment termination agreement. Indeed, "Si Supieran" was released outside of Universal Music. The rumors intensified after a Rolling Stone article was published citing Rubio's words as the headline: "I Am My Own Boss Now", thus confirming the rumors. But that was not the only controversy that accompanied "Si Supieran", the song was a response to what her former partners, Nicolás "Colate" Vallejo-Nájera and Gerado Bazúa, talked about her in the media; evidencing that both conspired to tarnish Rubio's public image. A similar message was displayed on her second single released without the Universal Music label, "De Qué Sirve". The independent song is a trap-ranchera proposal with pop overtones.

In March 2020, Rubio joined with Mexican musician Raymix in the song "Tú Y Yo". It reached number one in Mexico, giving Rubio her first number one on the Monitor Latino chart since "Golpes En El Corazón" nine years before. "Tú Y Yo" was certified platinum for sold 60,000 copies and won Cumbia Song of the Year - Regional Mexican at the 33rd Lo Nuestro Awards.

On 16 April 2020, Rubio performed a solo some of her hits as part of the One World: Together At Home virtual concert, a benefit event by Global Citizen to raise funds for the World Health Organization's COVID-19 Solidarity Response Fund. Her performance received widespread negative critics due to her strange behavior that developed during the performance, forgetting the lyrics of her own songs and wearing a very disheveled image. Several media and viewers attributed her poor coordination of the virtual concert and her strange behavior to the abuse of alcoholic beverages or drugs. The video was viral on social media, and two days later Rubio posted a video on her Instagram account mocking the moment. But the controversial video prompted her children's parents to take steps to request custody of their children. However, the Miami court judge refused to proceed because it could not be proven that Rubio had been under the influence of drugs.

On 7 October 2020, Rubio shared a video on Instagram talking about the controversial viral video, she explained that "what started as a live concert to participate in a social initiative, turned out to be one of the worst days of my life. It was hideous, but I learned from it." She also addressed rumors as to whether she was under the influence of any drugs while singing, confirming that "much of what has been said about me is a lie". Despite media scrutiny and public opinion about the viral video, some respected journalists empathized with Rubio. The Spanish writer Lucía Etxebarría said that Rubio "has not known a normal childhood or a normal adolescence and that she has been overextended all her life". She also examined the breakdown of Britney Spears in 2007 using it as an example as a case of severe media exposure. "If we have understood that Britney had a collapse because she could not bear all the pressure, we probably understand that Paulina Rubio has been subjected to pressure all her life that no one should impose on a child," Etxebarría explained.

=== 2021–present: New music, and Perrísimas Tour ===
On 18 September 2021, Rubio came back to the stage at the Miami Beach Pride where she headlined the festival. She performed some of her hits and was crowned as "Gay Queen". The same day, Rubio announced her new single "Yo Soy" on her social media. It was released 14 October 2021 through Sony Music, her new record label. Throughout the media, she has become known as "La Reina Dorada" ("The Golden Queen"), with which she wishes to assert herself in the music industry as a mature artist. In December 2021, after several negotiations, Rubio and Alejandra Guzmán announced that they would reunite for their first joint tour. The Perrísimas Tour had 22 dates in the United States, with several sold-out shows. It began on 15 April 2022 in Orlando, Florida, and ended on 22 May in Los Angeles, California.

Rubio continued to put out singles independently throughout 2022, 2023, 2024 releasing "Me Gusta", "No Es Mi Culpa", "Propiedad Privada" and "Balada Pop".

== Artistry ==
=== Influences ===
Rubio has stated that she initially became interested in entertainment during her childhood, naturally influenced by the career of her mother, Mexican actress Susana Dosamantes. She explained "I have been famous since I was born", rather than becoming famous after she joined Timbiriche. She has also commented that, when watching interviews as a child, she always noted how put-together and visually stunning her mother was. Rubio said that she "sang in front of the mirror", in her youth, to songs by Daniela Romo, Camilo Sesto, Juan Gabriel, José José, Mecano and Miguel Bosé. In a televised special for Univision, Rubio said that her first connection to music was through The Beatles, and that her first taste of the world of rock 'n roll music was from the English band Queen, when they first performed in México in 1981–a concert Rubio attended with her father in Puebla. "To see Freddie Mercury go out [on stage] with his sequin capes ... I dreamed of going out like him and doing that performance."

The American media has cited Madonna's career as being a comparable to Rubio's, mainly for her image, her character and highly detailed concerts. Music & Media magazine stated that "Rubio is in fact a latin replica of Madonna, complete with a picaresque face, blond hair, cowboy hat, and mini -skirt that is in fact a wide belt-indeed." In an interview with ABC newspaper, she said, "I am from Mexico and the hat is an element that is part of my culture. It has always accompanied me, since I was a child". In a HuffPost Live interview in 2014, Alyona Minkovski asked her what she thought about the media and fans calling her the "Latin Madonna", to which Rubio replied, "I love Madonna [...] she is strong, she is a warrior and she is an inspiration." However, Rubio has undoubtedly formed her own identity and musical style throughout her career. Luca Villa, from Rolling Stone magazine, clarified the comparisons, noting that "Like America's Madonna, she has reinvented herself with every new release."

Rubio has also been inspired-by and compared to Marilyn Monroe throughout her career. She received negative comments when she posted a picture on Instagram recreating the same look from Monroe's classic movie Gentlemen Prefer Blondes (1953); previously, Madonna had recreated the same look in the music video for her single "Material Girl" (1984). In a review of Rubio's 2004 show at the Auditorio Nacional in Mexico City, during the Pau-Latina World Tour, Spanish journalist Jesús Quintero suggested that, like Madonna, Rubio overflows with sensuality on stage "always in ménage à trois."

=== Musical style and themes ===
While Rubio incorporates an "eclectic" musical proposal, in different points of her discography has been described as Latin-style pop, dance-pop, pop-rock and electronic. She is known for giving Latin music a new avant-garde sound, as in her song "El Último Adiós", where she set a new standard in her musical career by combining mariachi and ranchera style with pop and hip hop. She has commented that "in music, there are no rules. Like painting, you can mix colors and textures. I feel very free to perform dance, rock and whatever else I want." Rubio has also experimented with genres such as folklore, regional Mexican and urban.

Rubio has described her music as "fun" and "lovely". Through her songs, she involves themes of everyday life and feminist hymns, but always inspired by love. She told ¡Hola!: "In my music you can find spite, nostalgia, joy, euphoria, but always inspired by love, the only feeling that makes me live, breathe." She has also stated that although the lyrics of her songs "are simple", she tries to offer a bit of poetry. Mexican writer Zeth Arellano considers that both Rubio's music and lyricism "encompasses all the extremes of emotions".

== Public image ==
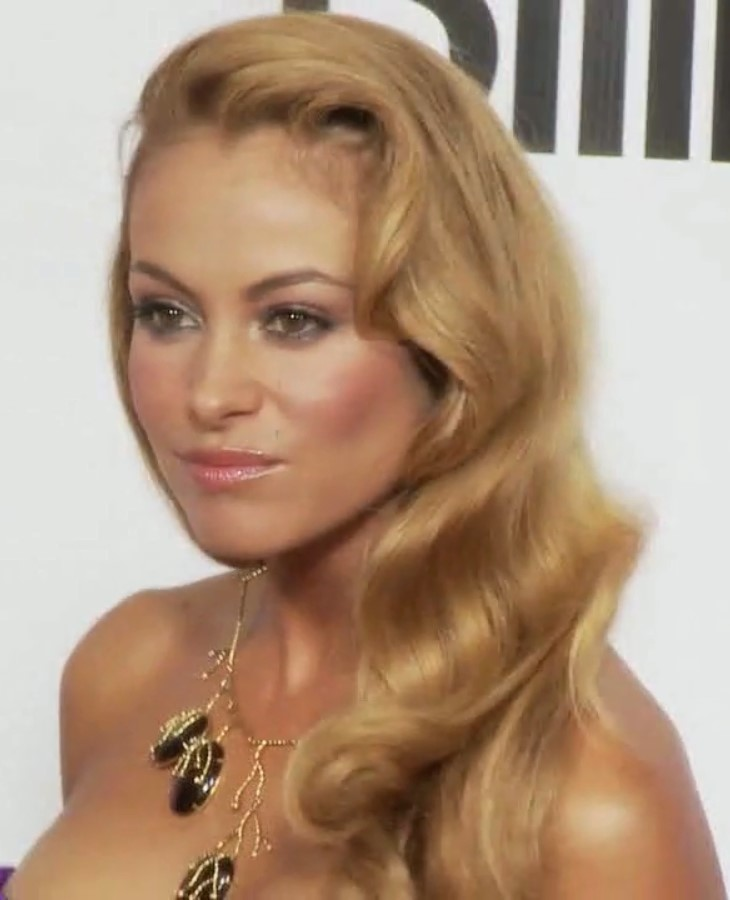
Paulina on the red carpet at the 2009 Latin Billboard Awards

On social media, Rubio was most followed Mexican person on Twitter between 2011 and 2019. She was included in Forbes list "Celebrity 100: Twitter's most-followed superstars" list in 2015. Since 2021, she is the third most followed Mexican person on Twitter.

Rubio's shows are also known to be expensive. In 2005, her performance at the Viña del Mar International Song Festival was considered one of the most "expensive". Her performance at the Santa Cruz de Tenerife gala in Spain in February 2020 became the most expensive performance ever paid by an artist at the event. The carnival councilor disclosed that "the Mexican singer was offered 103,000 euros for an 8-minute performance."

=== Fashion and media ===
Throughout her career, Rubio has chosen team who attempt to create a new "look" for her, and the resulting have appeared in a variety of magazines, from the cutting edge in the music entertainment Rolling Stone to the more traditionally sophisticated Vogue and Vanity Fair, making the Rubio face and name known to a broad range of people in different sectors. In 2002 was chosen the year's "most beautiful" cover girl of People En Español. She was having a crossover moment with her English-language album Border Girl and in 2005 Rubio decked up with others female celebrities of white and diamonds from Tiffany's for the "50 most beautiful" cover.

By 2000, Rubio was considered to have achieved a degree of musical credibility for having reinvented both musically and aesthetically as pop icon. She then became a more sophisticated performer with a flirtatious and playful persona attracted new fans all around the world. Alberto Pinteño, of the Spanish edition of Vanity Fair, described the singer as "that halo of a star that becomes an icon, for better or worse". Midi dresses became an essential part of her wardrobe and she was already encouraged to be more sensual in front of her viewers. Her Paulina era led to some media outlets referring to her as "Latin Madonna" for the great influence of the American artist in her videos, and like her, sensuality became a stronger element in her music videos and shows. The staff of the Mexican edition of Vogue wrote that "[her] towering heels, miniskirts, sun-kissed skin and curls that billowed in the wind were part of her personal trademark." The Spanish magazine Hola! wrote that "with her usual cowboy hat and miniskirts, [Rubio created] a style among the youngest girls." At that time, she began to associate with the feminist movement and express it through her music and concerts. The Spanish journalist Igor Cubillo by El País wrote that her music is a "fresh formula" in cohesion to "well exploited physical attractiveness, to her exaltation of feminine pride and the aforementioned Latin fashion" that made her a pop star that all the girls "want to look like her". Writing for the Houston Chronicle, Chuy Varela described "Every generation has its symbols and icons, prophets and elders. Rubio is to her generation what Maria Felix was to hers. But during Felix's day, Mexican women were expected to be more subservient and conservative. Rubio represents a more empowered, self-determined Mexican woman who is proud to be glamorous."

In 2006, she was ranked 12 on E! Entertainment's 25 Sexiest Pop Divas in the world list. She was also named one of the Latina's The 60 Sexiest Mexicans in Hollywood in 2018. Rubio was defined as a sex symbol after posing half naked or scantily clad in men's magazines like GQ, Maxim and MAN. In 2007, she was ranked sixty seven on FHM Magazine Spain's 100 Sexiest Women list. The media at the time attributed Rubio's sex appeal as a double-edged sword to sell an album and attract attention. In September 2021, Hard Rock & Casino Hotel Punta Cana in Dominican Republic unveiled its exhibition of celebrity items, in which it includes a characteristic Rubio costume.

For their part, many journalists and critics have assured that Rubio's great success has also been influenced by the events of her personal life. Since she began her career, the public had a great interest in exploring her personal life. El País journalist Elena Reina says that her success has been thanks to a "brilliant marketing strategy based on her private life".

Rubio is regarded as a gay icon. The staff of the Spanish women's magazine MujerdeElite wrote "[Rubio] was one of the first singers in the 1990s to incorporate gay images in her music videos" referring to the music video for "Enamorada", where she shows a homosexual couple. The publication quoted, "Since then, she has been the diva of choice for her upbeat, infectious music, full of eroticism and sexuality." She has been crowned "Gay Queen" in different cities in the United States and Latin America.

== Impact and legacy ==
Rubio has been recognised with many honorific nicknames. When she released her debut solo album La Chica Dorada in the early 1990s, several media gave her the title of the album. Since then, she has been known as "La Chica Dorada" ("The Golden Girl"), especially in Mexico and Latin America. By 2000, Rubio achieved internationalization in Europe with her album Paulina, then the Spanish press named her "El Huracán Mexicano" ("The Mexican Cyclone"). During that time, the media also called her "Madonna Latina" especially in the United States and Mexico, due to the great similarity of her music videos and provocative shows with the American artist. Rubio was consecrated as an international music star in 2000, and was referred as the "Queen of Latin Pop". In 2014, while serving as a coach on the third season of The X Factor, the Fox television network cemented her title as "Queen of Latino Pop" referring to her as "the Mexican superstar who has sold millions of records, she's spicy."

According to the critic José Noé Mercado, Rubio is an icon of pop culture in Latin America, and thanks to the success of her career "she helps us understand the now of our musical status in the pop and even rock world". Los Angeles Times's Alicia Civita included her in her article on "Latina Women on the War Foot in a Male-Dominated Music Industry" and said that Rubio along with her three other countrywomen of her generation "have managed to beat time with their proposals in order to maintain a certain validity with collaborations with exponents of the new generations".

Rubio identifies as a feminist, and is considered a "feminist icon". On feminism in Mexico she has mentioned to Los Angeles Times in 2002, "the stereotype of the Mexican woman as fragile, full of children and powerless has completely disappeared. I believe I am a woman with a strong character who knows the value of discipline and decisiveness." Spanish journalist Lorena Maldonado from online newspaper El Español wrote "The Mexican, by dint of a summer song and playful music, has more than once put the points on the i's with powerful lyrics", cite Rubio's most feminist songs like "Yo No Soy Esa Mujer", "Causa Y Efecto" y "Ni Rosas Ni Juguetes".

In 2002, Premios Oye! recognized Rubio as "Mexican Artist with Greatest International Projection". Univision included her in their list of "Most powerful Latinos" and "25 most influential Mexican musicians" en 2008 and 2011, respectively., She is the fifth female Latin artist on the Billboard Hot Latin Songs chart with the most number-one singles. Rubio's work has influenced artists as Eiza Gonzalez, Emilia Mernes, and Taboo.

== Other ventures ==
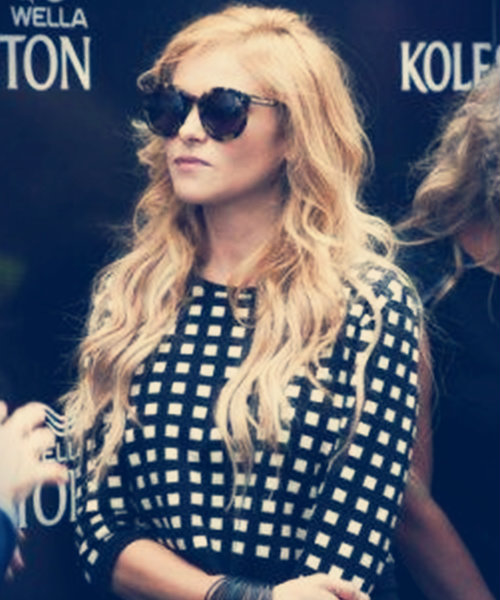
Rubio in the Koleston 2014 campaign

=== Product and endorsements ===
In 2002, Rubio signed a promotional deal with Dr Pepper's "Be You" advertising campaign. She filming a 30-second spot with Celia Cruz. In 2003, she signed a deal with Mexican shoe company Andrea to be their face for at least three years. The promotional deal extended until 2007. In 2007, she launched her own lipstick in partnership with MAC Cosmetics titled "Rubia". Paulina stated, "I love wearing make-up and use MAC products on stage and off, it's suitable for all occasions. I was thrilled when M.A.C approached me to create a new shade of lipstick and I instantly thought it should be a bold, vibrant matte lipstick that will look sexy on all women."

Rubio launched her own fragrance titled "ORO". The fragrance was released and created in conjunction with Oracle Beauty Brands. Rubio was the first Latin artist to partner with the company in a fragrance. ORO is a "fragrance is for women like me who believe in themselves; are strong, fun and unpredictable, yet tender and loving. I put so much creativity and love into this fragrance, I feel as if a drop of me is in each and every bottle to be shared with my fans and all women." ORO was put on sale in online stores in June 2009, as well as in large commercial chains such as Walmart and CVS Pharmacy in most of America countries and Spain.

In October 2013, Rubio designed and launched an exclusive line of "sensual, modern and casual" maxi bags, heels, high boots and booties in collaboration with JustFab. The collection inspired by the artist's own style sold more than 10,000 pairs in just three weeks. The collaboration lasted until 2014.

Rubio has also ventured out into modeling. She has walked on runways of events and the New York Fashion Week from designers such as Alvin Valley, Gaudí, Roberto Cavalli, Kiff-Kiff, Hernán Zajar among others. The singer is also signed under Elite Model Management, a modeling agency. Rubio was the "face" of the opening campaign for the French fashion house Louis Vuitton in Latin America in 2006. She also has a restaurant in Miami Beach called L'Entrecote de Paris.

In August 2010, when Rubio was five months pregnant with her first child, she was part of a campaign to promote the consumption of Got Milk? in Latin America. She appeared alongside her mother, Susana Dosamantes, in the photos of the advertising campaign.

In February 2006, Rubio starred in an advertisement for Ron Pomalca, for which there was an expensive contract of around $150,000. A commercial was filmed in Miami, and for the musicalization the hit "Algo Tienes" was covered. Since 2021, she has once again been a brand ambassador for an alcoholic beverage brand, Get Hot Tequila, produced in the lands of Jalisco, Mexico.

=== Philanthropy and humanitarian work ===
In 2007, Paulina joined the Latino Commission on AIDS, an organization in the fight against the spread HIV/AIDS in the Latino community. Paulina became the first "Mexican Madrina" to partner with the organization. Paulina stated, "It is important to make our voice heard and try to bring back some of the care that the community shares each day". On 17 May 2008, Paulina performed at the ALAS concert (América Latina en Acción Solidaria). The organization's mission is to strengthen and expand public and private sector support for Early Childhood Development in Latin America. In 2009, the singer received recognition from the American Heart Association for her work with the organization. Rubio also performed at the event to raise funds.

On 3 December 2009, Paulina held a press conference announcing the creation of an organization in partnership with the Lili Claire Foundation to provide assistance to children living with neurological disorders and their families. Fundación Paulina Rubio is a project inspired by children in anguish as a result of homelessness, birth defects, and lack of education among other pernicious plights that many face today. By directing funds through other pre-existing organizations, such as The Lili Claire Foundation, children will receive a unique and comprehensive blend of support services including medical and behavioral genetics clinics, psychosocial counseling, advocacy services, information libraries, and community outreach that will ultimately help improve the lives of families and children living with neurogenetic disorders.

In 2010, Rubio hosted the Paulina & Friends exclusive benefit concert for The Lili Claire Foundation which showcased musicians such as Luis Fonsi, Aleks Syntek, Noel Schajris, Reik and Fanny Lú. The purpose of the event was to raise funds to build a family resource center. "My friends mean everything to me and I am happy to have the opportunity to share the stage with them to support this great cause. All of them are excellent musicians and I know that as always, they'll do their best to make this an unforgettable night", said the singer. Jeff Simmons, community relations manager for The Lili Claire Foundation said, "I'm really surprised to see the number of artists who continue to join in on this great event, it's truly a blessing. Their contribution to the Paulina & Friends concert is spectacular and the Lili Claire Foundation will be forever grateful".

In 2018, Rubio appeared in a PETA video reminding people not to leave animals or children in parked cars.

== Discography ==
- La Chica Dorada (1992)
- 24 Kilates (1993)
- El Tiempo Es Oro (1995)
- Planeta Paulina (1996)
- Paulina (2000)
- Border Girl (2002)
- Pau-Latina (2004)
- Ananda (2006)
- Gran City Pop (2009)
- Brava! (2011)
- Deseo (2018)

== Tours ==
Solo tours

- Paulina World Tour (2001)

Date (2001)	City	Country	Venue
23 February	Mexico City	Mexico	Auditorio Nacional
25 March	Tampico	Mexico	Terrenos de la Feria
30 March	Managua	Nicaragua	Estadio Nacional Dennis Martínez
1 April	Panama City	Panama	Teatro Anayansi
2 April	San José	Costa Rica	Palacio de los Deportes
22 April	Aguascalientes	Mexico	Feria Nacional de San Marcos
28 April	Tijuana	Mexico	Unknown
5 May	Mérida	Mexico	Teatro del Pueblo
24 May	Acapulco	Mexico	Festival Acapulco
1 June	Mexico City	Mexico	Auditorio Nacional
3 June	Mexico City	Mexico	Auditorio Nacional
23 June	Universal City	United States	Universal Amphitheater
7 July	Mexico City	Mexico	La Boom
8 August	San Juan	Puerto Rico	Centro de Bellas Artes Luis A. Ferré
9 August	San Juan	Puerto Rico	Centro de Bellas Artes Luis A. Ferré
25 August	Tenerife	Spain	Costa Adehe Golf
8 September	Verona	Italy	Festivalbar
12 September	Verona	Italy	Verona Arena
14 September	Las Vegas	United States	Unknown
20 September	Madrid	Spain	Las Ventas
25 September	Barcelona	Spain	Palau dels Esports
27 September	Zaragoza	Spain	Pabellón San Felipe
28 September	Vitoria	Spain	Fernando Buesa Arena
2 October	Valencia	Spain	Plaza de Toros Valencia
Date (2002)	City	Country	Venue
21 February	Viña del Mar	Chile	Anfiteatro de la Quinta Vergara
15 March	Caracas	Venezuela	Caracas Pop Festival

- Pau-Latina Tour (2004–2005)
- Amor, Luz Y Sonido (2007–2008)
- Gran City Pop Tour (2009–2010)
- Brava! Tour (2012)
- Deseo Tour (2019)
- Camino Golden Hits World Tour (2023–2024)

Co-headlining tours

- QDQ Tour (2001) (with Café Quijano)
- Don't Turn off the Lights Tour (2002) (with Enrique Iglesias)
- Perrísimas Tour (2022) (with Alejandra Guzmán)

== Filmography ==
- El Día del Compadre (1983)
- Noche de Terrock y Brujas (1987)
- Bésame En La Boca (1995)
- Nietzsche (2003)
- Pledge This! (2006)

== See also ==
- Honorific nicknames in popular music
- Music of Mexico
- Latin pop
- List of Hispanic and Latino Americans
- Latin American music in the United States
- List of best-selling albums in Mexico
- List of best-selling Latin music artists
- List of most expensive music videos
