= Me Quema =

Single by Paulina Rubio

from the album Deseo
- Released: November 11, 2016
- Recorded: 2016
- Genre: Latin Pop
- Length: 3:16
- Label: Universal Music Spain
- Songwriters: Juan Pablo Villamil, Simon Vargas & Juan Pablo Isaza
- Producers: Andrés Torres & Mauricio Rengifo

Paulina Rubio singles chronology
"Si Te Vas" (2016)	"Me Quema" (2016)	"Desire (Me Tienes Loquita)" (2018)

Music video
- "Me Quema" on YouTube

"Me Quema" (It Burns Me) is a song by Mexican singer Paulina Rubio. The song was released to digital retailers and streaming services by the Spanish division of Universal Music Group on November 11, 2016 from Rubio's eleventh studio album "Deseo". The song was written by Juan Pablo Villamil, Simon Vargas and Juan Pablo Isaza, with a production by Andrés Torres and Mauricio Rengifo. Musically it is a pop song with elements of caribbean rhythms and acoustic sounds while lyrically it talks about loving someone without inhibitions.

== Music video ==
The accompanying music video for "Me Quema" was shot in Mexico City. It was directed by Alejandro Pérez, who directed the two versions to Rubio's previous single, "Si Te Vas". The video opens with shots of Rubio driving a convertible car. Close-up shots of Rubio then appear between scenes of her singing and dancing on an apartment. She knocks on the door of room number "69" while holding a bottle of champagne in another hand and out comes a handsome young man dressed only in underwear and an apron. Rubio repeats the action again and different boys come out. Inside the room, she observes several guys exercising or in the shower, while she walks upstairs or waits on a couch. Afterwards, Rubio heads back to her apartment driving her car, and as a glass cleaner approaches, she discovers that he has a tattoo of her on his arm. Before she knocks on his apartment door, she stops and remember at the glass cleaners. In the end, she goes back in her car to find him again.

== Track listing ==
- Digital download
1. "Me Quema" – 3:16

== Charts ==
=== Weekly charts ===
Chart (2016)	Peak position
Ecuador (National-Report)	32
Ecuador Pop (Monitor Latino)	14
Mexico (Billboard Espanol Airplay)	22
Mexico Pop (Monitor Latino)	12
Spain Physical/Digital (PROMUSICAE)	25
US Latin Pop Digital Songs Sales (Billboard)	12
Venezuela (National-Report)	59

Chart (2018)	Peak position
Ecuador (National-Report)	65

=== Year-end charts ===
Chart (2016)	Position
Panama Pop (Monitor Latino)	17
