= Nacho (singer) =

Venezuelan singer (born 1983)

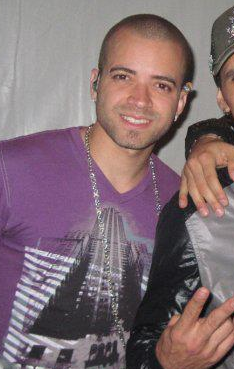

Background information
- Born: Miguel Ignacio Mendoza Donatti; 22 August 1983 (age 42); Lechería, Anzoátegui, Venezuela
- Origin: Maracaibo, Zulia, Venezuela
- Genres: Reggaeton; Latin pop; merengue; hip hop
- Occupations: Singer; songwriter; political activist; rapper
- Instrument: Vocals
- Years active: 2003–present
- Labels: Mackediches; Machete; Universal

Miguel Ignacio Mendoza Donatti (born 22 August 1983), better known as Nacho la criatura, is a Venezuelan singer and rapper. Born in Lechería, Anzoátegui, Venezuela. Currently lives in Miami, Florida, United States. He is a member of the duo Chino & Nacho.

== Biography ==
Nacho was born in the state of Anzoátegui, Venezuela, in Lechería, although he was raised in the city of Maracaibo, state of Zulia. He studied at the U.E.P María Auxiliadora, located in the Municipality Santa Rita and Social Communication, two years of Law and Electronic Engineering. Prior to debuting as part of the duet Chino & Nacho, he was part of the Calle Ciega group. He was also part of projects Los Niños del Swing, Equilibrio and the Venevisión Reality Show "Generación S".

== Career ==
=== 2007–17; 2020-present: Chino & Nacho ===
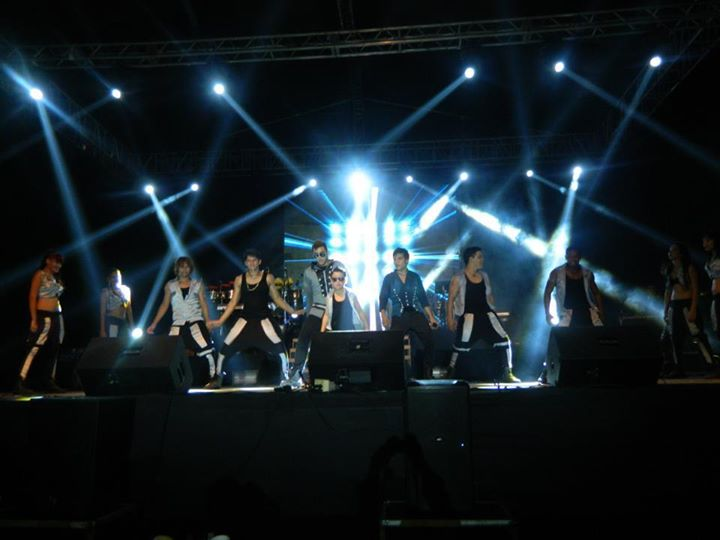
Chino & Nacho performing as a duo

He later on formed the duo Chino & Nacho gaining fame as a Latin artist. Notable songs by the duo included singles "Mi niña bonita", "Tu angelito", "Lo que no sabés tú", "El poeta", "Regálame un muac", "Bebé bonita", "Me voy enamorando" (with Farruko) and "Andas en mi cabeza" (featuring Daddy Yankee). The duo's "Radio Universo Tour" included more than 80 concerts in many countries including a gig at Madison Square Garden and American Airlines Arena. In 2010, the group won a Latin Grammy for Best Urban Album for Mi Niña Bonita.

=== 2017–present: Solo ===
In March 2017, Chino & Nacho announced that they would take a break as a duo. Nacho confessed that the desire to spend more time with his family was the main reason for the decision. "We were going to make more than 160 annual dates and there was a point where I began to regulate those trips so that they were less than 15 days, because I felt that I was abandoning my children, my wife".

Nacho signed with the record label Universal Music Group, to continue his solo career. In addition, he signed an agreement as a music executive, to help in the search for new talents and to give them the opportunity to make themselves known.

On 14 April 2017, the music video of his first single as a soloist, titled "Báilame", was made public, reaching a million hits a day after its release.

== Personal life ==
In 2019, he divorced his wife Inger Devera, with whom he shares three children, and began a relationship with Melany Mille. They had a child the following year.

== Discography ==
=== Albums ===
Title	Album details	Certifications
La Criatura	Released: 11 May 2018; Label: Universal Music Latin Entertainment; Format: CD, digital download	IFPI CHI: 15× Platinum; RIAA: 2× Platinum (Latin)
UNO	Released: 24 October 2019; Label: Universal Music Latin Entertainment; Format: CD, digital download	RIAA: 2× Platinum (Latin)
Folklórico	Released: 7 April 2022; Label: Universal Music Latin Entertainment; Format: CD, digital download	

=== Singles ===
==== As lead artist ====
List of singles as lead artist, with selected chart positions and certifications, showing year released and album name
Title	Year	Peak chart positions								Certifications	Album
Title	Year	VEN	ARG	COL	ECU	MEX	SPA	US Latin	US Latin Pop	Certifications	Album
"Báilame" (solo or with Yandel and Bad Bunny)	2017	1	2	8	1	46	1	5	2	AMPROFON: 2× Platinum; PROMUSICAE: 5× Platinum; RIAA: Diamond (Latin)	La Criatura and UNO
"Kung Fu" (with Dasoul)	2017	—	—	—	—	—	13	—		PROMUSICAE: Platinum	TBA
"Valiente" (with Franco De Vita featuring Victor Muñoz)	2017	—	—	—	—	—	—	—	—		Non-album singles
"Teddy" (with Kevin Roldán)	2017	—	—	—	—	—	—	—	—		Non-album singles
"Sígueme Bailando" (with Juan Magan featuring Pasabordo)	2017	67	—	—	33	—	83	—	—		Non-album singles
"Happy Happy" (featuring Los Mendonza)	2017	—	—	—	—	—	—	—	—	RIAA: Gold (Latin)	La Criatura
"Te Quiero Más" (with TINI)	2017	—	13	—	16	— (Note: "Te Quiero Más" did not enter the Billboard Mexico Airplay chart, but peaked at number 37 on the Billboard Mexican Espanol Airplay chart.)	—	—	—	CAPIF: Platinum; CUD: Gold	Quiero Volver
"Romance" (with Justin Quiles)	—	—	—	—	—	—	—	—	—	RIAA: Gold (Latin)	La Criatura
"Uh La La" (with MC Galaxy)	2018	—	—	—	—	—	—	—	—		La Criatura
"No Te Vas" (solo or with Wisin and Noriel)	2018	2	—	—	1	—	75	42	14	RIAA: Platinum (Latin)	La Criatura and UNO
"Soy Como Snapchat" (with Yulien Oviedo)	2018	—	—	—	—	—	—	—	—		La Criatura
"¿Qué Es El Amor?" (with Daniel Elbittar and Espinoza Paz)	2018	—	—	—	—	—	—	—	—		TBA
"Olha a Explosão Remix" (with Kevinho, 2 Chainz and French Montana)	2018	—	—	—	—	—	—	—	—	RIAA: Platinum (Latin)	TBA
"Desire (Me Tienes Loquita)" (with Paulina Rubio)	2018	—	—	—	—	—	—	—	—		Deseo
"Reggaeton Ton" (with Alexis & Fido)	2018	—	—	—	—	—	—	—	—		Non-album single
"Casualidad" (with Ozuna)	2018	—	—	—	—	—	67	—	19	RIAA: Platinum (Latin)	La Criatura and UNO
"No Te Creo" (with Felipe Peláez & Noriel)	2018	—	—	—	—	—	—	—	—		Ponle Actitud
"Danza"	2018	—	—	—	—	—	—	—	—		Non-album singles
"Cadela" (with Bryant Myers, Dayme y El High, MC Bin Laden & Almighty)	2018	—	—	—	—	—	—	—	—		Non-album singles
"El Universo de Tu Amor" (with Churo Díaz)	2018	—	—	—	—	—	—	—	—		TBA
"Déjalo" (with Manuel Turizo)	2018	—	67	—	—	—	—	—	24	RIAA: Platinum (Latin)	UNO
"Rosas O Espinas (Remix)" (with Joey Montana)	2018	—	—	—	—	—	—	—	—		Non-album single
"Nadie Sabe"	2019	—	—	—	—	—	—	—	—		UNO
"Destino" (with Greeicy)	2019	—	—	—	—	—	—	—	—	RIAA: Platinum (Latin)	Baila
"Cristina" (with Maffio and Justin Quiles featuring Shelow Shaq)	2019	—	—	—	—	—	—	—	—	AMPROFON: Platinum; RIAA: 2× Platinum (Latin)	
"Mona Lisa" (with Nicky Jam)	2019	—	—	—	—	—	—	—	—		UNO
"Lejos" (with Jordy Jill)	2019	—	—	—	—	—	—	—	—		TBA
"Te Solté (Remix)" (with Jacob Forever)	2019	—	—	—	—	—	—	—	—		Non-album single
"Mueve" (with Gianluca Vacchi, Becky G featuring MC Fioti)	2019	—	—	—	—	—	—	—	—		TBA
"La Vida Es Una Sola" (with Tito El Bambino)	2019	—	—	—	—	—	—	—	—		UNO
"Respete Uteh (Remix)" (with kenser and Bulova featuring El Mayor Clásico, Pusho, Ceky Viciny and Jerry Di)	2019	—	—	—	—	—	—	—	—		Non-album single
"F.O.K. Friends"	2019	—	—	—	—	—	—	—	—		UNO
"Mambo A Los Haters"	2019	—	—	—	—	—	—	—	—		UNO
"Mi Vida"	2019	—	—	—	—	—	—	—	—		UNO
"Corazón Bandido"	2019	—	—	—	—	—	—	—	—		UNO
"Emborráchate" (with Noriel)	2019	—	—	—	—	—	—	—	—		UNO
"Para Que Nunca Me Olvides"	2019	—	—	—	—	—	—	—	—		UNO
"Qué Más Da"	2019	—	—	—	—	—	—	—	—		UNO
"Maldades"	2019	—	—	—	—	—	—	—	—		UNO
"Raro" (with Chyno Miranda)	2020	—	—	—	—	—	—	—	—		TBA
"—" denotes a title that was not released or did not chart in that territory.

==== As featured artist ====
List of singles as featured artist, with selected chart positions and certifications, showing year released and album name
Title	Year	Peak chart positions						Certifications	Album
Title	Year	ARG	COL	MEX	SPA	US Latin	US Latin Pop	Certifications	Album
"Te Quiero Bonito" (Víctor Muñoz featuring Nacho)	2015	—	—	—	—	—	—		Non-album single
"Alguien Robó" (Sebastián Yatra featuring Nacho and Wisin)	2017	17	2	24	22	31	25	AMPROFON: 2× Platinum; PROMUSICAE: 2× Platinum; RIAA: 2× Platinum (Latin)	Mantra
"911" (Feid featuring Nacho)	2017	—	28	—	—	—	39		TBA
"—" denotes a title that was not released or did not chart in that territory.
