= Si Te Vas (Paulina Rubio song) =

Single by Paulina Rubio

from the album Deseo
- Released: January 22, 2016
- Recorded: 2015
- Genre: Latin Pop; Reggaeton
- Length: 3:34 (Pop Version); 4:21 (Versión Reggaeton)
- Label: Universal Music Spain
- Songwriters: Javier Garcia, Fonseca, Jonathan Julca, & David Julca; Alexis & Fido (Versión Reggaeton)
- Producers: Julca Brothers & Ernesto Riadigos

Paulina Rubio singles chronology
"Mi Nuevo Vicio" (2015)	"Si Te Vas" (2016)	"Me Quema" (2016)

"Si Te Vas" (English: If You Leave) is a song by Mexican singer Paulina Rubio. The song was released digitally via the iTunes Store by the Spanish division of Universal Music Group on January 22, 2016 as the second single from Rubio's eleventh studio album "Deseo". A second version of the song was also released in the reggaeton genre featuring Alexis & Fido.

== Promotion ==
Universal Music released 'Si Te Vas' in a CD Single format a limited edition of 10 copies autographed by Rubio. This promotion was only valid to residents of Mexico from February 9, 2016 - February 19, 2016, fans would register their credentials and create their best original memes using the #SiTeVas and upload them to Instagram and could participate as many times as they wish, the 10 winners were announced on February 19, 2016.

== Track listing ==
- Digital download (Pop Version)
1. "Si Te Vas" - 3:34
- Digital download (Reggaeton Version)
1. "Si Te Vas (Versión Reggaeton) [feat. Alexis & Fido]" - 4:21

== Charts ==
=== Weekly charts ===
Chart (2016)	Peak position
Mexico (Billboard Mexican Airplay)	47
Mexico (Billboard Espanol Airplay)	9
Spain (Promusicae)	66
Spain Physical/Digital Songs (PROMUSICAE)	11
US Latin Digital Songs (Billboard)	14
US Latin Pop Digital Songs Sales (Billboard)	3

=== Year-end charts ===
Chart (2016)	Position
Guatemala (Monitor Latino)	83
