= Mi Nuevo Vicio =

Single by Paulina Rubio featuring Morat

from the album Sobre El Amor Y Sus Efectos Secundarios and Deseo
- Released: January 27, 2015
- Recorded: 2014
- Genre: Latin pop
- Length: 4:01
- Label: Universal Spain
- Songwriters: Morat; Mauricio Rengifo
- Producer: Carlos Paucar • Mauricio Rengifo

Paulina Rubio singles chronology
"Boys Will Be Boys" (2012)	"Mi Nuevo Vicio" (2015)	"Si Te Vas" (2016)

Morat singles chronology
"Mi Nuevo Vicio" (2015)	"Cuánto Me Duele" (2015)

Music video
- "Mi Nuevo Vicio" ft. Morat (Video Oficial) on YouTube

"Mi Nuevo Vicio" (My New Vice) is a song by Mexican singer Paulina Rubio, featuring Morat, a Colombian band. It was released on 27 January 2015 by Universal Music Spain, and was later included on the track list of her eleventh studio album, Deseo (2018). The song was written by Juan Pablo Isaza, Juan Pablo Villamil, Simón Vargas, Alejandro Posada and Mauricio Rengifo, and produced by Sky Adams, Carlos Paucar and Rengifo. Musically, "Mi Nuevo Vicio" is a departure from her usual latin pop sound, and adapts to Colombian rumba with elements of rock pop. Lyrically, this talks about how genuine feelings develop during a love affair.

"Mi Nuevo Vicio" received critical acclaim from music critics, many whom praised the song's production. Commercially, the track reached number one in Mexico and Spain and the top ten in regions such as Latin America and Dominican Republic. It also appeared on the US Latin Airplay. Additionally, the song was certified double platinum by the Productores de Música de España for sales exceeding 80,000 units, and gold by the Asociación Mexicana de Productores de Fonogramas y Videogramas for 30,000 units.

The music video features Rubio dancing in a club with her love interest and then waking up with him in bed, over and over again. She also sings on a stage with Morat. To promote the single, Rubio performed the song at several gigs and shows including La Noche De Cadena 100, La Voz Spain, the Tu Mundo Awards, Telehit Awards, and on her Deseo tour.

== Music video ==
The music video for "Mi Nuevo Vicio" premiered on Rubio's channel on YouTube and VEVO. In the video, she can be seen rocking out with Morat in a packed club, then she routinely finds herself in the bed of a handsome man (played by Brazilian model Andre Costa) every morning afterword.

A review by Billboard staff described the Rubio's music video role as player "with boys who are younger, but not necessarily better, for her", and compared her to Anne Bancroft in the 1967 film The Graduate, where the American actress plays the role of Mrs. Robinson.

== Track listing ==
- Digital download
1. "Mi Nuevo Vicio" - 4:01

== Charts ==
=== Weekly charts ===
Chart (2015–2017)	Peak position
Dominican Republic Pop (Monitor Latino)	10
Ecuador (National-Report)	66
Mexico (Billboard Mexico Airplay)	22
Mexico (Monitor Latino)	16
Mexico Pop (Monitor Latino)	1
Spain (PROMUSICAE)	2
Spain Digital Song Sales (Billboard)	1
US Latin Airplay (Billboard)	42
US Latin Pop Airplay (Billboard)	12
US Pop (Monitor Latino)	11

=== Year-end charts ===
Chart (2015)	Position
Dominican Republic Pop (Monitor Latino)	20
Mexico Pop (Monitor Latino)	4
Spain (PROMUSICAE)	12
US Latin Pop Songs (Billboard)	44

Chart (2016)	Position
Dominican Republic Pop (Monitor Latino)	75
Panama Pop (Monitor Latino)	67

== Certifications ==
Region	Certification	Certified units/sales
Mexico (AMPROFON)	Gold	30,000^{‡}
Spain (Promusicae)	2× Platinum	80,000
^{‡} Sales+streaming figures based on certification alone.
