= Suave y Sutil =

Single by Paulina Rubio

from the album Deseo
- Released: September 7, 2018
- Recorded: 2018
- Genre: Pop rock
- Length: 3:30
- Label: Universal Music Spain
- Songwriter: Xabi San Martin
- Producers: Andrés Torres & Mauricio Rengifo

Paulina Rubio singles chronology
"Desire (Me Tienes Loquita)" (2018)	"Suave y Sutil" (2018)	"Ya No Me Engañas" (2019)

Music video
- "Suave Y Sutil" on YouTube

"Suave Y Sutil" (Soft and Subtle) is a song recorded by Mexican singer Paulina Rubio. It was released on September 7, 2018, through Universal Music Group as the fifth single from Rubio's eleventh studio album, Deseo (2018). The song was written by Xabi San Martín from La Oreja de Van Gogh, who work written Rubio's hit single "Ni Una Sola Palabra" in mid-2000s. "Suave Y Sutil" has been described as a pop-rock-tinged ballad and a powerful lyrics, and was produced by the duo Andrés Torres and Mauricio Rengifo, who were nominated at the 19th Annual Latin Grammy Awards for Producer of the Year, for his work in "Suave Y Sutil" and others Latin pop songs.

== Critical reception ==
Several media music called the song "empowering", and compared the lyrics with La Oreja de Van Gogh's music. Jordi Bardaji from Jenesaispop calling "Suave Y Sutil" a "melodic song" that La Oreja embrace on their works. According to Los 40, "Paulina repeats the formula that has worked so well in other songs such as Ni Una Sola Palabra: almost whispered verses and catchy choruses, and we love it!". Others digital media noted the song "fits perfectly with the style and [her] personality," and considered "Suave Y Sutil" is "practically a revision" of "Ni Una Sola Palabra", following the same sound key in pop-rock.

== Music video ==
The music video for "Suave Y Sutil" was directed by Mike Garcia and produced by Devon Libran and Axis3 Studios, and was filmed in Los Angeles. The Victorian era-style video "represents female empowerment" and shows Rubio with jewelry and clothing from that time. Rafa Sanchez from Cadena Dial explained that in the music video Rubio "shows herself as a strong woman" and made a parallelism with the singer's personal life assuring, "to completely consuming him, he[r lover] becomes a stone." It reminds the final scena of the video, when Rubio's lover become a stone when hi gazed into her eyes. A reference from Greek mythology about Medusa, an element that she used in "Él Me Engañó" music video.

It premiered on YouTube on October 12, 2018.

== Track listing ==
- Digital download
1. "Suave Y Sutil" – 3:30

== Charts ==
Chart (2018)	Peak position
Ecuador (National-Report)	24
Spain Physical/Digital Songs (PROMUSICAE)	18
US Latin Pop Digital Songs Sales (Billboard)	12
Venezuela (National-Report)	92
