= Deseo (Paulina Rubio album) =

Studio album by Paulina Rubio
- Released: September 14, 2018
- Recorded: 2014–2018
- Genre: Latin pop
- Length: 38:49
- Label: Universal Music Spain, S.L.U.
- Producers: Mauricio Rengifo; Andrés Torres; Juan Magán; The Julca Brothers; Toy "Selectah" Hernández; DCS; Wender Wagner Kramer; Luggi Giussepe Olivares Gordon; Carlos Paucar; Yasmil Marrufo; Enrique Larreal; Servando Primera; Mario Cáceres; Juan José Covarrubias

Paulina Rubio chronology
Pau Factor (2013)	Deseo (2018)

Singles from Deseo
- 1. "Mi Nuevo Vicio" Released: January 27, 2015; 2. "Si Te Vas" Released: January 22, 2016; 3. "Me Quema" Released: November 11, 2016; 4. "Desire (Me Tienes Loquita)" Released: May 25, 2018; 5. "Suave y Sutil" Released: September 7, 2018

Singles from Deseo (Special Edition)
- 1. "Ya No Me Engañas" Released: April 3, 2019

Deseo (Desire) is the eleventh studio album by Mexican recording artist Paulina Rubio, released on September 14, 2018 through Universal Music Spain, seven years after its predecessor Brava! (2011). Rubio worked with a multitude of producers and artist on the album, including Mauricio Rengifo, Andrés Torres, Juan Magán, The Julca Brothers, Toy "Selectah" Hernández, Morat, Joey Montana, Nacho, Xabier San Martin from La Oreja de Van Gogh, Alexis & Fido and DCS. It is a pop album characterized by Latin rhythms, urban sounds, and lyrical themes of love and female empowerment.

Five singles preceded the albums launch, released over the span of three years. These began in 2015 with "Mi Nuevo Vicio" featuring Colombian band Morat, followed in 2016 with the second and third singles, "Si Te Vas" and "Me Quema", and concluded in 2018 with the fourth and fifth singles "Desire (Me Tienes Loquita)" featuring Nacho and "Suave y Sutil". The album peaked at number eighteen in the Promusicae album charts. and number thirteen in Billboard Latin Pop Albums. The album was certified gold in Chile.

== Background and development ==
From 2012—while promoting her most recent studio album, Bravísima!, which re-packaged her original album from a year prior— Rubio worked as a coach in different versions of the competition television series La Voz. She also joined the panel of third and final season of the American music competition television show The X Factor, replacing Britney Spears. At the end of 2013 Universal Music released Rubio's first compilation album entitled Pau Factor, containing the most successful songs from her six studio albums on the record label.

Rubio first teased a new single on Valentine's Day 2014, playing a "La Bomba"-esque song "Cuanto Te Quiero" with producers in the studio. Even though she performed it live several times, the song's release as the album lead single was cancelled for unknown reasons.

A new single was released in January 2015, "Mi Nuevo Vicio", featuring Colombian group Morat, which it was speculated would be the first single from Rubio's eleventh studio album. The song was a success in Spain and Latin America, specially in the former, where it reached the number one spot for Physical/Digital Songs, but Rubio did not reveal the release of a new album. In a March 2020 interview with EFE, she said that at the time she was working "more as a producer, businesswoman, and, above all, as a mentor [in differents music competition television show]."

In December 2016, Rubio confirmed that the new album would feature contributions by DJ Snake and Selena Gomez, stating: "My new album is like another member of the team, or the family. It will be a true warrior, has something from all genres, from banda to pop, collaborations with DJ Snake and Selena Gomez. I tried to keep a key element: that the music is danceable". Gomez's representatives later denied that she worked with Rubio.

Rubio then continued to release the singles "Si Te Vas", "Me Quema" and "Desire (Me Tienes Loquita)", before finally revealing the title and release date of her new album, Deseo: September 14, 2018, a week after the release of another single titled "Suave Y Sutil". The song marked a return to her pop sound being a departure from the reggaeton-oriented singles that preceded it. The single was produced by Andrés Torres and Mauricio Rengifo, who had produced Latin hits like "Despacito" and "Echame La Culpa" by Luis Fonsi.

== Theme and artwork ==
Rubio explained that Deseo is about "a feeling that can resemble the way I am", also defined the album as "the wick that lights any fire as the desire to improve yourself, to get away from something you don't like, to change your life [or] simply having the strength to achieve what you want." The album's artwork features Rubio is sitting, with bare legs and high heels, playing a guitar and on top, with big red letters the word: DESEO is read, which gives the album its title. The cover album was presented September 3, 2018 on singer social media.

== Composition ==
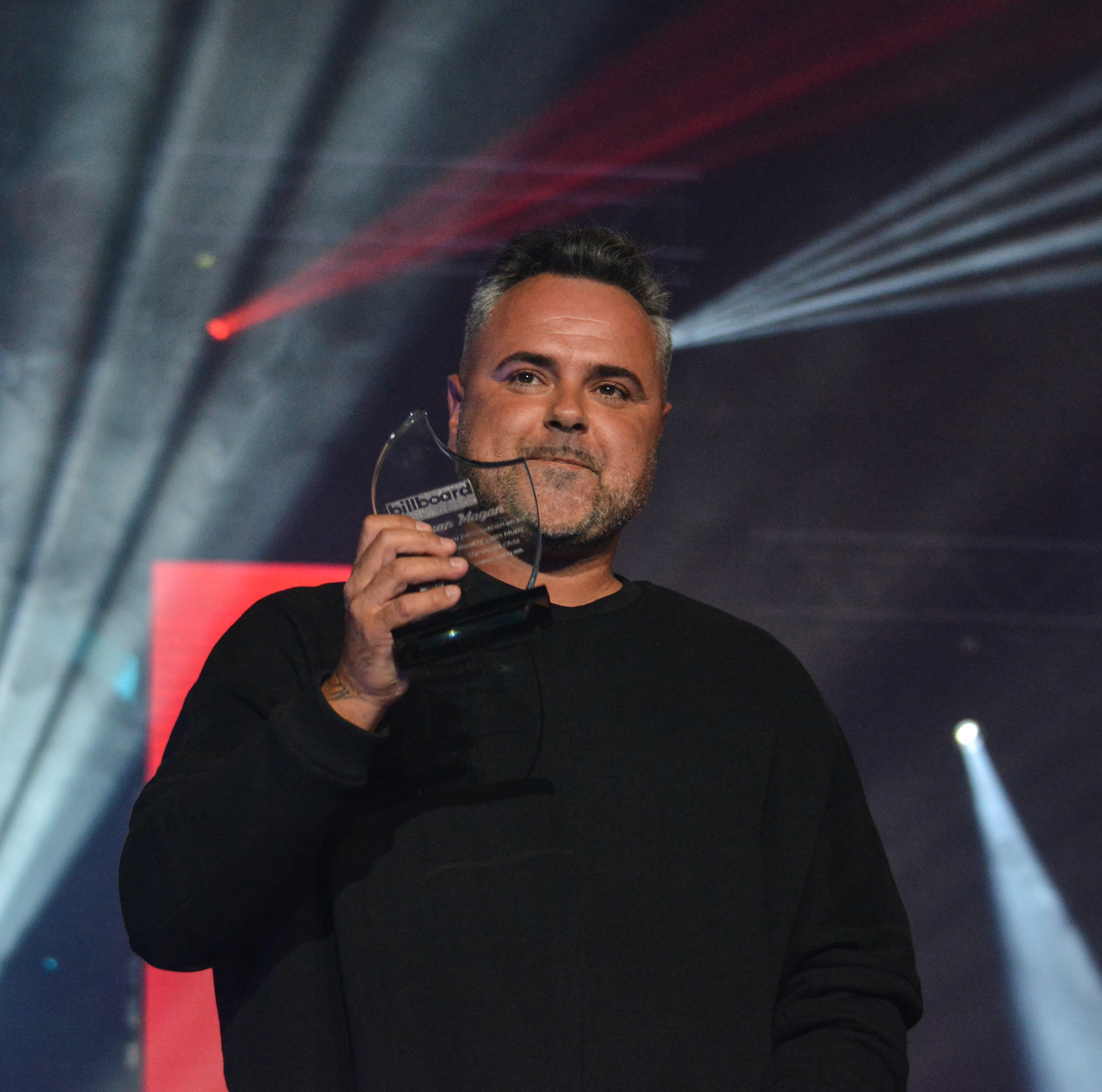
Spanish DJ and singer Juan Magán serves as a featuring artist and producer on the album.

Rubio commented that the content of Deseo "activate women's senses and capture who I am both on and off the stage"; the media call it an album where Rubio "empowered women". The album music genre is pop with a foray into reggaeton and "Latin rhythms abound with urban sounds." Lyrically, the record contains lyrics about "female empowerment", the love and the sexual desire.

Deseo opens with the lead single "Desire (Me Tienes Loquita)", a dance-pop EDM style and reggaeton hybrid song that include a collaboration with Venezuelan singer Nacho. "Suave Y Sutil" includes a different sound to the album's title track, a pop-rock song with a self-empowerment anthem, was described as a "practically a revision" of Rubio's mid-2000s hit "Ni Una Sola Palabra". "Me Quema" is a Latin pop style was noted for its tropical and Caribbean sound. The fourth track, "Late Mi Corazón", includes a featured with the Spanish producer and singer Juan Magán. Sonically, is a "party" song with urban and electro-dance influences. "Mi Nuevo Vicio" was deemed one of the album's highlights due to its production to acoustic guitars and Colombian rumba style. The song includes a collaboration with the Colombian pop band Morat.

"Hoy Eres Ayer" is a light pop-rock ballad characterized for its "melodic" strings and drums hooks. The seventh track "Cuánto Te Quiero" was noted for "La Bamba" sampler, featuring guitar riffs, a pop rhythm and a "futuristic marimba" bridge. Rubio's eldest son, Andrea Nicolás, participates in the choirs. "Entre La luna Y El Sol", cited the Mexican folk story of sun and moon love, is a ranchera track with reggae arrangements. "Bajo La Luna", one of the album's best tracks for utilizing her previous experimentation of gypsy style and flamenco music with a pop music, is a joy love song. The close album track, "Si Te Vas", it was compared to her 1990s work for its pop rock style.

== Critical reception ==
Professional ratings
Review scores
Source	Rating
Odi O'Malley	3.5/5 stars

Upon its release, critical reception of Deseo was sharply divided. According to several media, the album "maintains the same energy" of Rubio's music "but is not afraid to incorporate new contemporary sounds, especially from the urban genre." Odi O'Malley, writing from their website, listed the record as "a compilation: of its 10 songs, only 5 are new to the listener, and the rest are made up of singles released in the last three years". He favored the melodic pop-rock songs and "Mi Nuevo Vicio" as the album's best tracks, but also said, "Rubio try to catch up with trend music, use more urban bases, trying to include elements of dancehall or EDM to some tracks, although she did not come out well in any of them."

== Promotion ==
=== Singles ===
Throughout 2015 and 2016, Rubio released three solo songs, originally intended to be lead single from the album. "Mi Nuevo Vicio", released on January 27, 2015, features Colombian band Morat. It reached number one in Mexico and was certified gold, while in Spain reach number two on the general charts and number one on digital song sales chart. It additionally attained a double platinum certification for sales of 80,000 copies. "Si Te Vas" and a "Reggaeton Version" featuring Alexis & Fido, was released on January 22, 2016. The song landed top ten on Billboard Mexico Pop Español Airplay. "Me Quema", released on November 11, 2016, and reached number twenty-two in Mexico pop charts.

"Desire (Me Tienes Loquita)" featuring Venezuelan singer Nacho was released on May 25, 2018 as the album's lead single. It peaked at number four in Ecuador charts. On September 7, 2018, the album's second single, "Suave Y Sutil", was released. The song received praised from music critics and accompanying a music video that "represents female empowerment" through a Victorian era-style video.

"Ya No Me Engañas" was released as the first single from the album's deluxe edition, Deseo Edicion Especial on April 3, 2019. It was written by Xabi San Martin and produced by hit-makers Andres Torres and Mauricio Rengifo.

=== Tour ===
Rubio began her fourth world tour Deseo Tour in support of the album on 9 June 2019 in Santiago, Chile at the Gran Arena Monticiello, where hit a sold out. Paulina took part of a concert organized by La Voz in the WiZink Center in Madrid, Spain on June 8, 2019. She was accompanied by the other three coaches, Luis Fonsi, Antonio Orozco and Pablo Lopez; the coacher's advisors, David Bustamante, Karol G, Antonio Jose and Miriam Rodriguez; and the contestants, Andres Martin, Maria Espinosa, Javi Moya and Angel Cortes. David Bisbal and Helena Bianco (winner of La Voz Senior) were invited to the concert. She was also the first pop artist to perform in Monterrey's Showcenter Complex in Monterrey, Mexico, on June 22, 2019. She is also set to perform in San Jose, CA on September 12, 2019, also hitting New York, Los Angeles, Chicago, Houston, among others, before concluding in Washington, DC on September 29, 2019.

== Chart performance ==
The album peaked at #18 in the Spanish Promusicae album charts and #13 in the US Billboard Latin Pop Albums. The album eventually was certified gold in Chile.

== Reissue ==
Rubio released a deluxe edition of the album titled Deseo Edicion Especial. It included four new songs, in addition to the original tracklist of the album. "Ya No Me Engañas" was released in April, 2019, as the first single from the special edition.

== Track listing ==
Deseo track listing
No.	Title	Writer(s)	Producer(s)	Length
1.	"Desire (Me Tienes Loquita)" (Featuring Nacho)	Paulina Rubio; Mauricio Rengifo; Andrés Torres; Miguel Mendoza Donatti	Mauricio Rengifo; Andrés Torres	3:10
2.	"Suave y Sutil"	Xabier San Martin Beldarrain	Rengifo; Torres	3:30
3.	"Me Quema"	Juan Pablo Isaza, Juan Pablo Villamil, Simón Vargas	Rengifo; Torres	3:18
4.	"Late Mi Corazón" (Featuring Juan Magán)	Juan Magán; Darlyn Alberto Cuevas Segura; Wender Wagner Kramer; Luggi Giussepe Olivares Gordon	Juan Magán; DCS; Wender Wagner Kramer; Luggi Giussepe Olivares Gordon	2:56
5.	"Mi Nuevo Vicio" (Featuring Morat)	Isaza, Villamil, Vargas; Alejandro Posada; Mauricio Rengifo	Carlos Paucar; Rengifo	4:01
6.	"Hoy Eres Ayer"	David Julca; Jonathan Julca; Yoel Enríquez	The Julca Brothers	3:27
7.	"Cuánto Te Quiero"	Rubio; Julca; Julca; Ritchie Valens; Joey Montana	Julca Brothers	3:36
8.	"Entre La Luna Y El Sol"	Dani Macaco; Tomás "Tirtha" Rundquist	Toy "Selectah" Hernández	3:16
9.	"Bajo La Luna"	Rubio; Julca; Julca; Javier García	Julca Brothers	3:52
10.	"Si Te Vas"	Rubio; Julca; Julca; García; Juan Fernando Fonseca	Julca Brothers	3:33
11.	"Si Te Vas (Versión Reggaetón)" (Featuring Alexis & Fido)	Rubio; Julca; Julca; García; Juan Fernando Fonseca; Raúl Alexis Ortíz, Joel Fido Martínez	Julca Brothers	4:21
Total length:				38:49

=== Edición Especial ===
Deseo Edición Especial track listing
No.	Title	Writer(s)	Producer(s)	Length
1.	"Desire (Me Tienes Loquita)" (Featuring Nacho)	Paulina Rubio; Mauricio Rengifo; Andrés Torres; Miguel Mendoza Donatti	Mauricio Rengifo; Andrés Torres	3:10
2.	"Suave y Sutil"	Xabier San Martin Beldarrain	Rengifo; Torres	3:30
3.	"Me Quema"	Juan Pablo Isaza, Juan Pablo Villamil, Simón Vargas	Rengifo; Torres	3:18
4.	"Late Mi Corazón" (Featuring Juan Magán)	Juan Magán; Darlyn Alberto Cuevas Segura; Wender Wagner Kramer; Luggi Giussepe Olivares Gordon	Juan Magán; DCS; Wender Wagner Kramer; Luggi Giussepe Olivares Gordon	2:56
5.	"Mi Nuevo Vicio" (Featuring Morat)	Isaza, Villamil, Vargas; Alejandro Posada; Mauricio Rengifo	Carlos Paucar; Rengifo	4:01
6.	"Hoy Eres Ayer"	David Julca; Jonathan Julca; Yoel Enríquez	The Julca Brothers	3:27
7.	"Cuánto Te Quiero"	Rubio; Julca; Julca; Ritchie Valens; Joey Montana	Julca Brothers	3:36
8.	"Entre La Luna Y El Sol"	Dani Macaco; Tomás "Tirtha" Rundquist	Toy "Selectah" Hernández	3:16
9.	"Bajo La Luna"	Rubio; Julca; Julca; Javier García	Julca Brothers	3:52
10.	"Si Te Vas"	Rubio; Julca; Julca; García; Juan Fernando Fonseca	Julca Brothers	3:33
11.	"Si Te Vas (Versión Reggaetón)" (Featuring Alexis & Fido)	Rubio; Julca; Julca; García; Juan Fernando Fonseca; Raúl Alexis Ortíz, Joel Fido Martínez	Julca Brothers	4:21
12.	"Ya No Me Engañas"	San Martín Beldarrain	Rengifo; Torres	3:15
13.	"Te Quise Y Te Quiero"	Rengifo; Isaza, Villamil	Rengifo; Torres	3:45
14.	"Adentro"	Rubio; Yasmil Marrufo; Servando Primera; Mario Cáceres	Yasmil Marrufo; Servando Primera; Mario Cáceres	3:30
15.	"Dame Más (Afterparty)"	Rubio; Primera; Enrique Larreal; Cáceres; Marrufo; Juan José Covarrubias	Enrique Larreal; Juan José Covarrubias	3:45
Total length:				52:48

Samples

- "Cuánto Te Quiero" contains elements from Mexican folk song "La Bamba".

== Charts ==
Chart (2018)	Peak position
Spanish Albums (Promusicae)	18
US Latin Pop Albums (Billboard)	13
US Latin Albums Sales (Billboard)	4

== Certifications ==
Region	Certification	Certified units/sales
Chile (IFPI Chile)	Gold	3,000
