= Paulina Rubio discography =

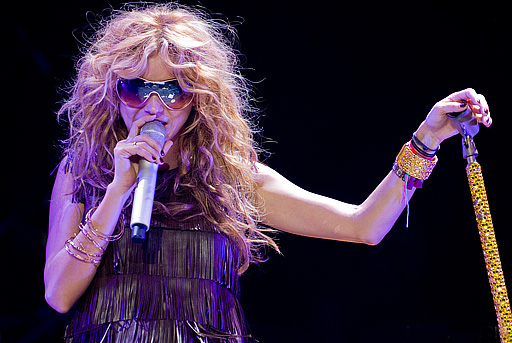
- Rubio performing during the Amor, Luz y Sonido Tour in 2007
- Studio albums: 11
- Extended plays: 7
- Compilation albums: 15
- Singles: 65
- Box sets: 5
- Guest appearances: 11

Mexican singer-songwriter Paulina Rubio has released eleven studio albums, fifteen compilation albums, 65 singles (including seven as featured artist), ten promotional singles, and has made some eleven guest appearances. In 1992, Rubio signed a recording contract with record label Capitol Latin (EMI Music) in order to launch her career as a solo artist, after recording ten albums with Timbiriche between 1982 and 1990.

Rubio made her debut in August 1992 with "Mío", which was followed by the release of her debut studio album, La Chica Dorada (1992). The record figured on the Mexican Albums Chart and the US Billboard Top Latin Albums and Latin Pop Albums, being later certified platinum in Mexico. The singer's second studio album, 24 Kilates, was made available for consumption on November 16, 1993. The lead single, "Nieva, Nieva" was her third number-one single in Mexico. In March 1995, the singer's third album, El Tiempo Es Oro, spawned the hit "Te Daría Mi Vida", which had been pointed out by music critics for being a musical departure from her previous material and sold 140,000 copies between the United States and Mexico. Rubio released her fourth studio album and last under the EMI Music record label, Planeta Paulina, in September 1996, which featured "Siempre Tuya Desde La Raíz" — a dance-pop oriented tune that incorporates elements of techno, house and disco sounds — and "Enamorada", which earned Rubio credibility among critics as songwriter and music producer.

Following experimentation with different musical genres through 2000, Rubio's Paulina was released in May of the same year through record label Universal Music Group, and became the fastest-selling record ever by a female act in Mexico, bringing sales of three million units and certified diamond. Unlike all of the singer's previous records, Paulina was promoted through international magazine interviews, talk-show appearances or televised performances in Italy, United Kingdom and Germany, and was accompanied by a supporting world tour as well. It spawned five number-one singles ("Lo Haré Por Ti", "El Último Adiós", "Y Yo Sigo Aquí", "Yo No Soy Esa Mujer" and "Vive El Verano"). With the release of her sixth studio album and only English-language album, Border Girl (2002), Rubio became the only Mexican female act certified gold by the Recording Industry Association of America (RIAA) in the United States. The album featured commercially successful international hits like "I'll Be Right Here (Sexual Lover)" and "Don't Say Goodbye". In 2004, she released the song "Te Quise Tanto", which gave her her first number-one song in the Billboard Hot Latin Songs chart. The track was included on her seventh studio album, Pau-Latina, which reached number one in the US, and became her first album to yield four top-ten hits in the US Latin chart, with "Algo Tienes", "Dame Otro Tequila" and "Mía".

Rubio's eighth studio album, Ananda, was released in 2006. Receiving positive reviews from music critics, it experienced commercial success, although it was the lowest-selling record of her career in Europe. The album including the hit single "Ni Una Sola Palabra", which was a success in Finland and Spain. Rubio began working on her ninth studio album in 2008; Gran City Pop was released in 2009 and received positive reviews from music critics. The album debuted at number two on the US Billboard Top Latin Albums chart and number one on the Latin Pop Albums chart, and spawned the hit singles "Causa y Efecto" and "Ni Rosas Ni Juguetes", which did well in Latin America. Rubio's tenth album, Brava!, was released in 2011 and in 2012 was reissued as Bravísima! It generated the singles "Me Gustas Tanto", which became her fifth number-one song on Billboard Hot Latin Songs, and "Boys Will Be Boys", which was a hit in Spain. Following participation in several talent shows like The X Factor and La Voz, Rubio's eleventh studio album, Deseo, was released in September 2018. Unlike all of the singer's previous records, it not was a success. The lead single "Mi Nuevo Vicio" was number one in Mexico and Spain and certified gold and double platinum.

By 2016, Rubio had sold 1.4 million albums in the United States, according to Nielsen SoundScan and has sold over 15 million copies worldwide, making her one of the best-selling Latin music artists of all time.

== Albums ==
=== Studio albums ===
List of studio albums, with selected chart positions and certifications
Title	Album details	Peak chart positions						Certifications	Sales
Title	Album details	MEX	ITA	SPA	US 200	US Latin	US Latin Pop	Certifications	Sales
La Chica Dorada	Released: October 20, 1992; Label: Capitol Latin; Formats: LP, CD, Cassette	—	—	—	—	42	2	MEX: 3× Gold	MEX: 450,000
24 Kilates	Released: November 16, 1993; Label: Capitol Latin; Formats: LP, CD, Cassette	—	—	—	—	—	—	MEX: Platinum	MEX: 300,000
El Tiempo Es Oro	Released: March 21, 1995; Label: EMI Latin; Formats: LP, CD, Cassette	—	—	—	—	—	—		MEX: 100,000
Planeta Paulina	Released: September 3, 1996; Label: EMI Latin; Formats: LP, CD, Cassette	—	—	—	—	—	—		
Paulina	Released: May 23, 2000; Label: Universal Latino; Formats: CD, Cassette, digital download	—	50	2	156	1	1	AMPROFON: 4× Platinum; RIAA: 8× Platinum (Latin)	World: 3,000,000; SPA: 400,000; US: 480,000
Border Girl	1st English album; Released: June 18, 2002; Label: Universal Records; Formats: CD, Cassette, digital download	—	35	14	11	—	—	AMPROFON: Platinum; RIAA: Gold; PROMUSICAE: Platinum	World: 1,000,000; US: 286,000; MEX: 154,948
Pau-Latina	Released: February 10, 2004; Label: Universal Latino; Formats: CD, Cassette, digital download	—	—	14	105	1	1	AMPROFON: Platinum; RIAA: 2× Platinum (Latin)	World: 500,000; US: 200,000
Ananda	Released: September 16, 2006; Label: Universal Latino; Formats: CD, Cassette, digital download	—	—	2	31	1	1	AMPROFON: Gold; PROMUSICAE: 2× Platinum; RIAA: 2× Platinum (Latin)	World: 600,000; MEX: 90,000; US: 250,000
Gran City Pop	Released: June 23, 2009; Label: Universal Latino; Formats: CD, Cassette, digital download	2	—	3	44	2	1	AMPROFON: Gold; PROMUSICAE: Gold	World: 400,000; US: 100,000; MEX: 40,000
Brava!	Released: November 15, 2011; Label: Universal Latino; Formats: CD, Cassette, digital download	5	—	26	—	3	2		World: 100,000; MEX: 28,000
Deseo	Released: September 14, 2018; Label: Universal Latino; Formats: CD, digital download	—	—	18	—	—	13		
"—" denotes a recording that did not chart or was not released in that territory.

=== Compilation albums ===
List of compilation albums, with selected chart positions
Title	Album details	Peak chart positions		
Title	Album details	SPA	US Latin	US Latin Pop
Grandes Éxitos/Versiones Remix	Released: 1996; Label: EMI Colombia; Formats: CD, cassette	—	—	—
Top Hits	Released: July 18, 2000; Label: EMI Music; Formats: CD, cassette, digital download	30	—	—
I'm So In Love: Grandes Éxitos	Released: November 20, 2001; Label: Capitol, EMI Music; Formats: CD, cassette, digital download	—	75	—
Flashback: Greatest Hits	Released: November 5, 2002; Label: EMI Music; Formats: CD	—	—	—
Latin Classics	Released: August 19, 2003; Label: EMI Music; Formats: CD	—	—	—
La Historia	Released: December 2, 2003; Label: EMI Music; Formats: CD, cassette, digital download	—	—	—
Sin Pausa	Released: March 23, 2004; Label: EMI Music, Capitol; Formats: CD, digital download	—	—	—
Viva La Diva	Released: September 7, 2004; Label: EMI Music, Capitol; Formats: CD, digital download	—	—	—
La Latina	Released: March 29, 2005; Label: EMI Music; Formats: CD	—	—	—
Las Número 1	Released: 2005; Label: EMI Music, Capitol; Formats: CD, digital download	—	—	—
Mío: Paulina Y Sus Éxitos	Released: July 18, 2006; Label: EMI Music, Capitol Latin; Formats: CD, cassette, digital download	—	—	—
Paulina Remixes	Released: January 16, 2007; Label: EMI Music; Formats: CD, cassette, digital download	—	—	—
Celebridades	Released: March 25, 2008; Label: EMI Music, Capitol; Formats: CD, cassette	—	—	—
Mis Grandes Éxitos	Released: 2011; Label: EMI Music, Capitol; Formats: CD, digital download	—	—	—
Pau Factor	6th compilation album; Released: November 25, 2013; Label: Universal Music Latino; Formats: digital download, CD	—	37	13
"—" denotes a recording that did not chart or was not released in that territory.

=== Box sets ===
List of box sets, with details
Title	Album details
30 Éxitos Insuperables	Released: April 1, 2003; Label: EMI Music; Format: CD
Original Masters	Released: February 15, 2005; Label: EMI Music; Format: CD
40 Éxitos	Released: 2005; Label: EMI Music; Format: CD
Gran Pop Hits	Released: 2009; Label: EMI Music; Format: CD, DVD
2 en 1: Pau-Latina/Paulina	Released: February 17, 2017; Label: Universal Music; Format: CD

== Extended plays ==
List of extended plays, with details
Title	Details
Paulina Rubio	Released: January, 1993; Label: Capitol Latin; Formats: Vinyl, 12" and CD
MaxiSingle	Released: October, 1995; Label: EMI Music; Formats: digital download
Ayúdame Hit Pack	Released: May 17, 2007; Label: Universal Music; Formats: digital download
6 Super Hits	Released: November 17, 2009; Formats: digital download
Gran City Pop: The Remixes	Released: April 27, 2010; Formats: digital download
Brava! Reload	Released: July 24, 2012; Label: Universal Music; Formats: CD, digital download
Bravísima!	Released: September 18, 2012; Label: Universal Music; Formats: CD, digital download

== Singles ==
=== As a lead artist ===
==== 1990s ====
List of singles as lead artist in the 1990s decade, with selected chart positions and certifications, showing year released and album name
Title	Year	Peak chart positions		Certifications	Album
Title	Year	MEX	US Latin	Certifications	Album
"Mío"	1992	—	3	AMPROFON: Gold	La Chica Dorada
"Abriendo Las Puertas Al Amor"	1993	—	9		La Chica Dorada
"Amor De Mujer"	1993	—	8		La Chica Dorada
"Sabor A Miel"	1993	—	22		La Chica Dorada
"Nieva, Nieva"	1993	1	27		24 Kilates
"Él Me Engañó"	1994	5	—		24 Kilates
"Vuelve Junto A Mi"	1994	—	20		24 Kilates
"Asunto De Dos"	1994	12	—		24 Kilates
"Te Daría Mi Vida"	1995	—	—		El Tiempo Es Oro
"Nada De Ti"	1995	—	—		El Tiempo Es Oro
"Hoy Te Dejé De Amar"	1995	—	—		El Tiempo Es Oro
"Bésame En La Boca"	1995	—	—		El Tiempo Es Oro
"Pobre Niña Rica" (or alternative version)	1995	—	—		MaxiSingle
"Siempre Tuya Desde La Raíz"	1996	—	—		Planeta Paulina
"Solo Por Ti"	1996	—	—		Planeta Paulina
"Miedo"	1996	—	—		Planeta Paulina
"Enamorada"	1997	—	—		Planeta Paulina
"—" denotes releases that did not chart or were not released.

==== 2000s ====
List of singles as lead artist in the 2000s decade, with selected chart positions and certifications, showing year released and album name
Title	Year	Peak chart positions										Certifications	Album
Title	Year	MEX	AUS	CAN	FIN	ITA	SPA	US	US Latin	US Latin Pop	US Trop	Certifications	Album
"Lo Haré Por Ti"	2000	—	—	—	—	31	9	—	13	7	23		Paulina
"El Último Adiós"	2000	—	—	—	—	—	—	—	18	13	24		Paulina
"Y Yo Sigo Aquí"	2000	—	—	—	—	18	15	—	3	2	6		Paulina
"Yo No Soy Esa Mujer"	2001	—	—	—	—	—	—	—	7	3	16		Paulina
"Vive El Verano"	2001	—	—	—	—	31	11	—	—	—	—		Paulina
"Sexi Dance"	2001	—	—	—	—	—	—	—	34	18	26		Paulina
"Tal Vez, Quizá"	2001	—	—	—	—	—	—	—	42	20	32		Paulina
"I'll Be Right Here (Sexual Lover)" (crossover lead single)	2001	—	—	—	—	—	—	—	—	—	—		Border Girl
"Don't Say Goodbye" / "Si Tú Te Vas"	2002	—	19	7	—	18	1	41	5	5	5		Border Girl
"The One You Love" / "Todo Mi Amor"	2002	—	—	—	—	—	—	97	5	2	8		Border Girl
"Casanova" / "Baila Casanova"	2002	—	—	—	—	—	—	—	37	22	17		Border Girl
"Libre"	2003	—	—	—	—	—	—	—	—	—	—		Border Girl
"Te Quise Tanto"	2003	—	—	—	—	—	—	—	1	1	3		Pau-Latina
"Algo Tienes"	2004	—	—	—	—	—	—	—	4	1	4		Pau-Latina
"Dame Otro Tequila"	2004	—	—	—	—	—	—	—	1	1	2		Pau-Latina
"Mía"	2005	—	—	—	—	—	—	—	8	5	—		Pau-Latina
"Ni Una Sola Palabra"	2006	—	—	—	3	—	—	98	1	1	2	PROMUSICAE: 3× Platinum	Ananda
"Nada Puede Cambiarme"	2007	—	—	—	—	—	—	—	21	6	33	PROMUSICAE: Gold	Ananda
"Ayúdame"	2007	—	—	—	—	—	—	—	36	11	—		Ananda
"Que Me Voy A Quedar"	2007	—	—	—	—	—	—	—	—	—	—		Ananda
"Causa Y Efecto"	2009	1	—	—	—	—	7	—	1	1	6	PROMUSICAE: Platinum	Gran City Pop
"Ni Rosas Ni Juguetes" (solo, Pitbull remix, and Jenni Rivera banda versions)	2009	13	—	—	—	—	3	—	9	5	39	PROMUSICAE: Platinum	Gran City Pop
"—" denotes releases that did not chart or were not released.

==== 2010s ====
List of singles as lead artist in the 2010s decade, with selected chart positions and certifications, showing year released and album name
Title	Year	Peak chart positions							Certifications	Album
Title	Year	MEX	ECU	SPA	US Latin	US Latin Pop	US Trop	VEN	Certifications	Album
"Algo De Ti"	2010	—	—	48	—	—	—	—		Gran City Pop
"Me Gustas Tanto"	2011	12	—	4	1	2	3	—		Brava!, Brava! Reload or Bravísima!
"Me Voy" (with Espinoza Paz)	2012	33	—	—	—	(Note: "Me Voy" did not enter the Billboard Latin Pop Songs, but peaked at number 15 on the Latin Pop Digital Song Sales chart.)	—	—		Brava!, Brava! Reload or Bravísima!
"Boys Will Be Boys"	2012	7	—	2	—	16	10	—	PROMUSICAE: Gold	Brava!, Brava! Reload or Bravísima!
"All Around the World"	2012	—	—	—	—	—	—	—		Brava!, Brava! Reload or Bravísima!
"Mi Nuevo Vicio" (with Morat)	2015	22	66	2	—	12	—	—	AMPROFON: Gold; PROMUSICAE: 2× Platinum	Deseo
"Si Te Vas" (solo or featuring Alexis & Fido)	2016	47	—	66	—	— (Note: "Si Te Vas" did not enter the Billboard Latin Pop Songs, but peaked at number 3 on the Latin Pop Digital Song Sales chart.)	—	—		Deseo
"Me Quema"	2016	—	32	— (Note: "Me Quema" did not enter the Spanish Top 100 chart, but peaked at number 25 on the Spain Physical/Digital chart)	—	— (Note: "Me Quema" did not enter the Billboard Latin Pop Songs, but peaked at number 12 on the Latin Pop Digital Song Sales chart.)	—	—		Deseo
"Desire (Me Tienes Loquita)" (with Nacho)	2018	—	4	— (Note: "Desire (Me Tienes Loquita" did not enter the Spanish Top 100 chart, but peaked at number 15 on the Spain Physical/Digital chart)	—	— (Note: "Desire (Me Tienes Loquita" did not enter the Billboard Latin Pop Songs, but peaked at number 5 on the Latin Pop Digital Song Sales chart.)	—	47		Deseo
"Suave y Sutil"	2018	—	24	— (Note: "Suave y Sutil" did not enter the Spanish Top 100 chart, but peaked at number 18 on the Spain Physical/Digital chart)	—	— (Note: "Suave y Sutil" did not enter the Billboard Latin Pop Songs, but peaked at number 12 on the Latin Pop Digital Song Sales chart.)	—	92		Deseo
"Ya No Me Engañas"	2019	—	—	—	—	—	—	—		Deseo
"Si Supieran"	2019	—	—	—	—	23	—	—		Non-album single
"De Qué Sirve"	2019	—	—	—	—	— (Note: "De Qué Sirve" did not enter the Billboard Latin Pop Songs, but peaked at number 14 on the Latin Pop Digital Song Sales chart.)	—	—		Non-album single
"—" denotes releases that did not chart or were not released.

==== 2020s ====
List of singles as lead artist in the 2020s decade, with selected chart positions, showing year released and album name
Title	Year	Peak chart positions			Certifications	Album
Title	Year	MEX	US Latin Pop	US Trop	Certifications	Album
"Tú y Yo" (with Raymix)	2020	1	9	3	AMPROFON: Platinum	Te Voy A Conquistar
"Yo Soy"	2021	26	—	—		Non-album single
"Me Gusta" (with Maffio)	2022	—	—	—		Non-album single
"No Es Mi Culpa"	2023	—	—	—		Non-album single
"Propiedad Privada"	2023	—	—	—		Non-album single
"—" denotes releases that did not chart or were not released.

==== Footnotes ====
Notes for peak chart positions

=== As featured artist ===
List of singles as featured artist, with selected chart positions and certifications, showing year released and album name
Title	Year	Peak chart positions			Certifications	Album
Title	Year	SPA	US Latin	US Latin Pop	Certifications	Album
"When You Say Nothing at All (Nada Más Que Hablar)" (Ronan Keating featuring Paulina Rubio)	2003	—	—	—		Turn It On and 10 Years of Hits
"Nada Fue Un Error" (Coti with Paulina Rubio and Julieta Venegas)	2005	—	40	15		Esta Mañana Y Otros Cuentos
"Otra Vez" (Coti with Paulina Rubio)	2006	—	—	—		Esta Mañana Y Otros Cuentos
"Nena" (Miguel Bosé with Paulina Rubio)	2007	—	27	6	PROMUSICAE: Gold + Platinum	Papito
"Dirty Picture" (Spanish version Taio Cruz featuring Paulina Rubio)	2010	—	—	—		Rokstarr (Spanish edition)
"Golpes en el Corazón"	2011	—	39	—		MTV Unplugged: Los Tigres del Norte and Friends
"Vuelve" (Juan Magán featuring Paulina Rubio and DCS)	2015	4	—	—	AMPROFON: 3× Platinum	#TheKingIsBack
"—" denotes a recording that did not chart or was not released in that territory.

=== Charity singles ===
List of charity singles with chart positions, showing year released and notes
Title	Year	Peaks		Notes
Title	Year	SPA	US Under	Notes
"El Ultimo Adios (The Last Goodbye)" (among Artists for 9/11 attacks)	2001	—	—	To commemorate the September 11 attacks and support the families of the victims. Proceeds of the recording went to the American Red Cross and the United Way.
"Somos El Mundo 25 Por Haiti" (among Artists for Haiti)	2010	31	15	To raise money for Haitian earthquake victims.
"Dónde Está El Amor?" (among The Black Eyed Peas and "The World")	2016	—	—	The Black Eyed Peas partnered with issues-driven media company ATTN and foundation education partner and leading geospatial company Esri for the single release campaign.
"—" denotes a recording that did not chart or was not released in that territory.

=== Promotional singles ===
Title	Year	Peak chart positions		Album
Title	Year	US Latin	US Latin Pop	Album
"La Chica Dorada"	1992	—	—	La Chica Dorada
"Tú Sólo Tú"	1994	—	—	24 Kilates
"Amarnos No Es Pecado"	1995	—	—	El Tiempo Es Oro
"Sin Aire"	2001	—	—	Paulina
"I'm So In Love"	2002	—	—	I'm So in Love: Grandes Éxitos
"Fire (Sexy Dance)"	2003	—	—	Border Girl
"Perros"	2004	—	—	Pau-Latina
"Alma En Libertad"	2005	39	24	Pau-Latina
"Volverás"	2005	—	—	Pau-Latina
"Me Siento Mucho Más Fuerte Sin Tu Amor"	2007	—	—	Ananda
"Hoy"	2007	—	—	Ananda
"Heat of the Night"	2012	—	—	Brava!, Brava! Reload or Bravísima
"Late Mi Corazón"	2018	—	—	Deseo
"Xico: Semilla de Paz"	2020	—	—	El Camino de Xico
"Mi Decisión" (with Fangoria)	2023	—	—	La Novia de América
"—" denotes a recording that did not chart or was not released in that territory.

== Other appearances ==
List of non-single guest appearances, with other performing artists, showing year released and album name
Title	Year	Other artist(s)	Album
"Será Entre Tú Y Yo"	1996	None	Voces Unidas
"Historia De Navidad"	1997	None	Estrellas De Navidad
"Mírame A Los Ojos"	2001	None	As Filhas Da Mãe Internacional
"Border Girl"	2002	None	Nescafe Gold Ballads 10
"Undeniable"	2002	None	Sabor Da Paixão Internacional
"Lo Siento Mi Amor" (live)	2003	Rocío Jurado	Rocío Siempre
"Cómo Me La Maravillaría Yo" (live from el Gran Teatre Liceu de Barcelona)	2008	Rosario	Parte De Mí
"Un Beso Y Una Flor"	2009	None	40 Años Con Nino
"No Más Traiciones"	2009	Sergio Vallín	Bendito Entre Las Mujeres
"No Al Alguacil"	2011	Gloria Trevi	Gloria
"Mal De Amores"	2013	Juan Magán	Mal De Amores - The Remixes

== See also ==
- List of songs recorded by Paulina Rubio
- Paulina Rubio videography
- List of best-selling albums in Mexico

== Timbiriche discography ==
Albums where Paulina Rubio was a band member:

- 1999: En Concierto 1999
- 1998: Timbiriche Clásico
- 1990: Timbiriche X
- 1989: Los Clásicos De Timbiriche
- 1988: Timbiriche VIII & IX
- 1987: Timbiriche VII
- 1985: Timbiriche Rock Show
- 1984: Timbiriche Vaselina
- 1983: Que No Acabe Navidad
- 1983: Disco Ruido
- 1983: En Concierto
- 1982: La Banda Timbiriche
- 1982: Timbiriche
