= Top Hits (Paulina Rubio album) =

Greatest hits album by Paulina Rubio
- Released: July 18, 2000
- Recorded: 1991–1996
- Studios: Balu-Balu Studios (Madrid, España); South Beach Studios (Miami, Florida); Studio Center (Miami, Florida); Castle Recording Studio (Miami, Florida); Moonlight Music Studios (Miami, Florida)
- Genres: Pop; dance-pop; latin ballad
- Length: 54:50
- Label: EMI Latin
- Producers: Miguel Blasco; José Ramón Flórez; Don Matamoros; Marco Flores; Adrián Posse; Paulina Rubio; Oscar Mediavilla; Eduardo Posadas

Paulina Rubio chronology
Paulina (2000)	Top Hits (2000)	I'm So in Love: Grandes Éxitos (2001)

Professional ratings
Review scores
Source	Rating
Allmusic	3/5 stars

Top Hits is the first greatest hits album by Mexican singer Paulina Rubio. It was released on July 18, 2000, through EMI Latin in United States. The album was released in two different editions, standard and limited, with the latter containing two remixes incorporates elements of Rubio's earlier singles. The album includes a new track: "Será Entre Tú Y Yo", which was previously released on the 1996 Olympics album Voces Unidas.

Top Hits received mixed reviews from music critics. Allmusic felt that it brings Paulina Rubio's best, before crossing over with her first English-language. The compilation album reached number thirty in Spain, despite receiving promotion from the singer.

== Material ==
The album consists with thirteen greatest hits from Rubio's first records: "Mío", "Amor De Mujer", and "Sabor A Miel" from La Chica Dorada (1992); "Nieva, Nieva", "Él Me Engañó", and "Asunto De Dos" from 24 Kilates (1993); "Te Daría Mi Vida", "Nada De Ti", "Hoy Te Dejé De Amar", and "Bésame En La Boca" from El Tiempo Es Oro (1995); and, "Siempre Tuya Desde La Raíz", "Solo Por Ti", and "Enamorada" from Planeta Paulina (1996). The newly material for the album, which was included for the first time in a compilation album of the singer, begins with previously released for the 1996 Summer Olympics album Voces Unidas, "Será Entre Tú Y Yo", written by Marco Flores, and produced by Oscar Mediavilla. The "energetic and rhythmic" final tracks "Megahits" incorporates elements of Rubio's biggest hit singles remix by DJ Eduardo Posadas.

== Critical reception ==
Drago Bonacich of Allmusic opined that the collection of greatest hits "comprising more than a decade of romantic ballads and dance/pop songs", and explained "Top Hits brings Paulina Rubio's best, before crossing over with her first English-language single called "Sexual Lover".

== Track listing ==
Top Hits — North American edition and digital edition
No.	Title	Writer(s)	Producer(s)	Length
1.	"Mío"	José Ramón Flórez; Cesar Valle	José Ramón Flórez; Miguel Blasco	3:44
2.	"Amor de Mujer"	Flórez; Valle; Gian Pietro Felisatti	Flórez; Blasco	3:53
3.	"Sabor a Miel"	Flórez; Valle	Blasco	3:33
4.	"Nieva, Nieva"	Valle; Mari Carmen Sanchez	Blasco	3:32
5.	"Él Me Engañó"	Don Matamoros; Valle	Blasco	4:09
6.	"Asunto De Dos"	Flórez; Fredy Marugán	Blasco	3:41
7.	"Te Daría Mi Vida"	Valle; Sánchez	Blasco	4:14
8.	"Nada De Ti"	Marco Flores	Blasco; Flores	3:31
9.	"Hoy Te Dejé De Amar"	Flores	Blasco; Flores	3:55
10.	"Solo Por Ti"	Flores	Flores	4:16
11.	"Enamorada"	Valle; Paulina Rubio	Flores; Paulina Rubio	3:29
12.	"Siempre Tuya Desde La Raíz"	Karla Aponte; Cesar Lemos; Rodolfo Castillo	Flores	4:41
13.	"Bésame En La Boca"	Adrián Posse; Didi Gutman	Adrián Posse	3:53
14.	"Será Entre Tú Y Yo"	Flores	Oscar Mediavilla	4:19
Total length:				54:50

Top Hits — International edition
No.	Title	Writer(s)	Producer(s)	Length
15.	"Megahits" (Radio Version)	Flórez; Valle; Sánchez; Aponte; Lemos; Castillo; Flores	Eduardo Posadas	4:46
16.	"Megahits" (Extended Version)	Flórez; Valle; Sánchez; Aponte; Lemos; Castillo; Rubio; Flores	Posadas	8:56
Total length:				69:17

== Charts ==
Country	Peak position
Spain Albums Chart (Promusicae)	30
