= Paulina Remixes =

Remix album by Paulina Rubio
- Released: January 16, 2007
- Recorded: 1991–1996
- Genres: Pop; dance; club
- Length: 1:19:43
- Label: EMI

Paulina Rubio chronology
Ananda (2006)	Paulina Remixes (2007)	Gran City Pop (2009)

Paulina Remixes is the first remix album by Mexican recording artist Paulina Rubio. It was released on January 16, 2007 through EMI Music. The album contains remixes of tracks from her first four studio albums—La Chica Dorada (1992), 24 Kilates (1993), El Tiempo Es Oro (1995) and Planeta Paulina (1996)—and a new remix of her "Megahits". The remixes were done by NPS, Alejandro "Midi" Ortega, and Mijangos. The music was influenced by various genres of club music, such as dance and house.

Paulina Remixes received positive reviews from music critics. Some reviewers called it a good remix compilation.

== Release ==
Paulina Remixes received little promotion compared to Rubio's standards. On November 30, 2006, her first remix album was released through digital stores like Amazon and ITunes Store. Fans were excited because it was a novelty and Paulina Rubio's website put it up for sale. On January 16, 2007 Paulina Remixes was launched in digital format in Mexico and the United States.

== Critical reception ==
Paulina Remixes received positive reviews from music critics.

== Track listing ==
Paulina Remixes – Standard edition
No.	Title	Writer(s)	Length
1.	"La Chica Dorada" (NPS Remix)	José Ramón Flórez; Cesar Valle; Paulina Rubio	4:24
2.	"Dime Si Soy Sexy" (NPS Remix)	Flórez; Valle	5:05
3.	"Sabor A Miel" (NPS Remix)	Flórez; Valle	5:38
4.	"Asunto De Dos" (NPS Remix)	Flórez; Fredi Marugán	5:19
5.	"Nieva, Nieva" (Remix)	Carlos Sánchez; Valle	8:03
6.	"Él Me Engañó" (NPS Remix)	Valle; Don Matamoros	4:43
7.	"Te Daría Mi Vida" (Big Mix)	Sánchez; Valle	6:13
8.	"Nada De Ti" (Big Mix)	Marco Flores	6:30
9.	"Tú Y Yo^{[a]}" (70's Remix)	Flores	7:54
10.	"Enamorada^{[b]}" (Mijango's Club Mix)	Rubio; Valle	7:06
11.	"Tuya Desde La Raíz^{[c]}" (Mijango's Club Mix)	Karla Aponte; Cesar Lemos; Rodolfo Castillo	6:46
12.	"Megahits" (Mío/Amor De Mujer/Nieva, Nieva/Nada De Ti/Te Daría Mi Vida/Enamorada/Siempre Tuya Desde La Raíz/Solo Por Ti)	Flórez; Valle; Sánchez; Flores; Rubio; Aponte; Lemos; Castillo	12:05
Total length:			01:19:43

Notes

- ^{^a} signifies that it is the name that was assigned to "Solo Por Ti" remix
- ^{^b} signifies that it is the name that was assigned to "I'm So In Love" remix
- ^{^c} signifies that it is the name that was assigned to "Siempre Tuya Desde La Raíz" remix

== Personnel ==
Based on Discogs

- Andrei Cruz – A&R
- Jeannette Ruiz – art direction
