= Celebridades =

Greatest hits album by Paulina Rubio
- Released: March 2008
- Recorded: 1992–1996
- Genres: Pop, dance-pop
- Label: EMI

Paulina Rubio chronology
Paulina Remixes (2007)	Celebridades (2008)	Gran City Pop (2009)

Celebridades is a CD of collection that included Paulina Rubio's best hits and live presentation, it was released as CD. and DVD. in March 25, 2008.

== CD ==
#	Track	Compositor	Album	Duration
1	Amor de Mujer	Difelisatti; José Ramón Florez; Valle	La Chica Dorada	3:50
2	Corazón tirano	Fredy Marugan; José Ramón Florez	24 Kilates	3:51
3	Mío	Valle; José Ramón Florez	La Chica Dorada	3:33
4	Te Daría Mi Vida	Carlos Sánchez; Cesar Valle	El Tiempo Es Oro	4:12
5	Siempre Tuya Desde la Raíz	César lemos; Karla Aponte; Rodolfo Castillo	Planeta Paulina	4:39
6	Nieva, Nieva	Carlos Sánches; Cesar Valle; Mari-Carmen Sánches	24 Kilates	3:31
7	Enamorada	Paulina Rubio; Cecar Valle	Planeta Paulina	3:27
8	Sangre Latina	Flores; José Ramón Florez; Valle	La Chica Dorada	3:36
9	Me Estoy Enamorando	Carlos Sánchez; Cesar Valle	El Tiempo Es Oro	3:35
10	La Chica Dorada	Difelisatti; José Ramón Florez-Valle	La Chica Dorada	3:08
11	Él Me Engañó	Cesar Valle; Don Matamoros	24 Kilates	4:09
12	Sabor A Miel	José Ramón Flores	La Chica Dorada	3:33
13	El Primer Amor	(Aleks Syntek)	La Chica Dorada	3:17
14	Nada de Ti	Marco Flores	El Tiempo Es Oro	3:31
15	Hoy Te Dejé De Amar	Marco Flores	El Tiempo Es Oro	4:55
16	Asunto de Dos	Don Matamoros	24 Kilates	3:40
17	Pobre niña rica	Marco Flores	Planeta Paulina	4:25
18	Dime Si Soy Sexy	Flores; José Ramón Florez-Valle	La Chica Dorada	3:56

== DVD ==
#	Track	Compositor	Album	Duration
1	Amor de Mujer	Difelisatti; José Ramón Florez; Valle	La Chica Dorada	3:50
2	Mío	Valle; José Ramón Florez	La Chica Dorada	3:33
3	Te Daría Mi Vida	Carlos Sánchez; Cesar Valle	El Tiempo Es Oro	4:05
4	Nieva, Nieva	Carlos Sánches; Cesar Valle; Mari-Carmen Sánches	24 Kilates	4:13
5	El Me Engañó	Cesar Valle; Don Matamoros	24 Kilates	4:09
6	Sabor a Miel	José Ramón Flores	La Chica Dorada	3:27
7	Nada de Ti	Marco Flores	El Tiempo Es Oro	3:28
8	Pobre niña rica	Marco Flores	Planeta Paulina	4:22
9	Siempre Tuya Desde La Raíz	César lemos; Karla Aponte; Rodolfo Castillo	Planeta Paulina	4:39
10	Miel y Sal	Karla Aponte; César Lemus	Planeta Paulina	5:06
