= I'm So in Love: Grandes Éxitos =

Greatest hits album by Paulina Rubio
- Released: November 20, 2001
- Recorded: 1992–1996
- Genre: Latin pop
- Length: 70:48
- Label: EMI Latin

Paulina Rubio chronology
Top Hits (2000)	I'm So in Love: Grandes Éxitos (2001)	Border Girl (2002)

Singles from I'm So In Love: Grandes Éxitos
- 1. "I'm So In Love" Released: January 2002 (Note: Released to US Rhythmic radio only)

Professional ratings
Review scores
Source	Rating
Allmusic	3/5 stars

I'm So in Love: Grandes Éxitos is the second greatest hits album by Mexican pop singer Paulina Rubio. It was released in 2002. Like her previous compilation Top Hits, released only a year before (2001), I'm So in Love: Grandes Éxitos contains Rubio's biggest Spanish hits from 1992 up to 1996, with the addition of the English versions of her hits "Enamorada" (as the title track "I'm So In Love") and Sólo Por Ti (as "Only For You"). The album also contains a remix of "I'm So In Love" and a medley of her hits previously included in Top Hits.

The song "I'm So In Love" was released to US Rhythmic radio only in January 2002.

== Background ==
In 1996, Rubio released her last album under the EMI Latin label, the Spanish-language Planeta Paulina. Rubio also recorded English versions of several of the songs on the album, but eventually they were not included. The English songs were being held to be released as part of Paulina's first English crossover album, which was supposed to be the English version of the Planeta Paulina album, but EMI later declined to release it. Some of these English songs were finally released years later as part of an album on this hits compilation.

== Track listing ==
I'm So In Love: Grandes Éxitos — North American edition
No.	Title	Writer(s)	Producer(s)	Length
1.	"I'm So In Love"	Paulina Rubio; Cesar Valle	Paulina Rubio	3:28
2.	"Mío"	J.R. Florez; Cesar Valle	Miguel Blasco; J.R. Florez	3:44
3.	"Te Daría Mi Vida"	C. Sánchez; Valle	Blasco	4:13
4.	"Only For You"	Marco Flores	Marco Flores	4:16
5.	"Él Me Engañó"	Don Matamoros; Valle	Blasco	4:09
6.	"Sabor A Miel"	Florez; Valle	Blasco; Florez	3:32
7.	"Asunto De Dos"	Florez; Fredi Marugán	Blasco	3:41
8.	"Open Up Your Heart"	Karla Aponte; Cesar Lemos; Rodolfo Castillo	Flores	4:40
9.	"Abriendo Las Puertas Al Amor"	Florez; Gian Pietro Felisatti	Florez	4:38
10.	"Nieva, Nieva"	Sánchez; Valle	Blasco	3:31
11.	"Pobre Niña Rica"	Graciela Carballo; Mario Pupparo	Flores	3:36
12.	"Nada De Ti"	Flores	Blasco	3:31
13.	"Hoy Te Dejé De Amar"	Flores	Blasco	3:56
14.	"Amor de Mujer"	Felisatti; Florez	Blasco	3:53
15.	"I'm So In Love" (Mijango's Classic Mix)	Rubio; Valle	Rubio	7:04
16.	"Megahits" (Extended Version Mix)	Flores; Valle; Sánchez; Aponte; Lemos; Castillo; Rubio	Rubio	8:56
Total length:				70:48

== Charts ==
Chart (2002)	Peak position
US Latin Albums (Billboard)	75
