= Mio: Paulina Y Sus Éxitos =

Mío: Paulina Y Sus Éxitos

Greatest hits album by Paulina Rubio
- Released: July 18, 2006
- Recorded: 1992–1996
- Genre: Pop
- Label: EMI

Paulina Rubio chronology
Pau-Latina (2004)	Mío: Paulina Y Sus Éxitos (2006)	Ananda (2006)

Professional ratings
Review scores
Source	Rating
Allmusic	3/5 stars

Mío: Paulina Y Sus Éxitos is a compilation album by Mexican pop singer Paulina Rubio. It was released in 2006 and contains 20 tracks from Rubio's first four studio albums.

== Track listing ==
Mío: Paulina Y Sus Éxitos
No.	Title	Writer(s)	Producer(s)	Length
1.	"Te Daría Mi Vida"	Carlos Sánchez; Cesar Valle	Miguel Blasco	4:12
2.	"Mío"	J.R. Florez; Cesar Valle	Blasco; J.R. Florez	3:46
3.	"Amor De Mujer"	Gian Pietro Felisatti; Florez	Blasco; Florez	3:54
4.	"Enamorada"	Paulina Rubio; Valle	Paulina Rubio; Marco Flores	3:30
5.	"Despiértate"	Erlandsson, Lenander, Morel; Per Magnusson; David Kreuger; Rubio	Rubio; Flores	3:12
6.	"Él Me Engañó"	Valle; Don Matamoros	Blasco	4:11
7.	"Sangre Latina"	Florez; Valle	Blasco	4:38
8.	"Miel Y Sal"	Karla Aponte; Cesar Lemos; Marcello Azevedo	Flores	4:14
9.	"Vuelve Junto A Mi"	Sánchez; Valle	Blasco	3:37
10.	"Solo Por Ti"	Flores	Flores	4:17
11.	"Bésame En La Boca"	Adrián Posse; Didi Gutman	Adrián Posse	3:53
12.	"Tú Y Yo"	Flores; KC Porter	Flores; KC Porter	4:07
13.	"Pobre Niña Rica"	Graciela Carballo; Mario Pupparo	Flores	3:38
14.	"Hoy Te Dejé De Amar"	Flores	Flores	3:57
15.	"Sola"	Valle; Sánchez; Nacio Herb Brown	Blasco	5:17
16.	"Si Te Marchas Con Otra"	Valle; Sánchez	Blasco	3:56
17.	"Sabor A Miel"	Florez; Valle	Blasco	3:33
18.	"Abriendo Las Puertas Al Amor"	Difelisatti; Florez; Valle	Blasco	4:38
19.	"Nada Puedes Hacer"	Don Matamoros; Valle	Blasco	34:26
20.	"Maldito Amor"	Sánchez; Valle	Blasco	3:36
Total length:				80:21
