= Kilat =

Kilat is a Hiligaynon and Cebuano word which means "lightning".

Kilat may also refer to:

- León Kilat, a revolutionary leader in Cebu during the Philippine Revolution against Spain
- Junior Kilat, a Filipino reggae band
- Kilat Serrada, a Filipino martial art founded by Roy Sevilla Garciano

== See also ==
- 24 Kilates, an album released in 1993 by Mexican singer Paulina Rubio
