= 24 Kilates =

Studio album by Paulina Rubio
- Released: November 16, 1993
- Recorded: April – August 17, 1993
- Studios: Balu-Balu (Madrid, Spain)
- Genre: Pop rock
- Length: 42:45
- Label: EMI Capitol de México
- Producers: Miguel Blasco (Exec.), Don Matamoros, César Valle, J.R. Florez

Paulina Rubio chronology
La Chica Dorada (1992)	24 Kilates (1993)	El Tiempo Es Oro (1995)

Singles from 24 Kilates
- 1. "Nieva, Nieva" Released: September 29, 1993; 2. "Vuelve Junto A Mi" Released: January 14, 1994; 3. "Él Me Engañó" Released: February 3, 1994; 4. "Asunto De Dos" Released: June 4, 1994

24 Kilates ("24 Karats") is the second studio album by Mexican recording artist Paulina Rubio, released by EMI Capitol de México on November 16, 1993. Following the success of her debut album, Rubio reunited with the Spanish producer Miguel Blasco, who produced her second music project, while the songs were written mostly by Cesar Valle, Don Matamoros and C. Sánchez. The recording sessions took place in Spain during the summer of 1993, coinciding with Rubio promotion her first concert tour in South America.

24 Kilates received mixed reviews from music critics, who considered the album rock-oriented sound with influences of jazz, funk, and dance. The album was commercial success, reached the top in Mexico and sold 300,000 a few weeks after its release.

Four singles were taken from the album. The first single was "Nieva, Nieva", which was successful on the charts, reaching number one in Mexico. Two other singles, "Él Me Engañó" and "Asunto De Dos", peaked in the top ten in Mexico charts. "Vuelve Junto A Mí" was only released in the United States, where it appeared on the Billboard charts. The album was promoted further through Rubio's first and second concert tours, and a concert residency in the famous Mexican club El Patio.

In an article by El Siglo de Torreón published in 1994, Rubio was cited as "the current novelty", considering it together with other stars of music as a guarantee at the box office due to its commercial success in the Latin American music industry. Alluding the success of her first album and 24 Kilates.

== Background and recording ==
"I want it to follow the same musical line [of La Chica Dorada], but that doesn't mean I haven't evolved. On the contrary [...] we did a very original and different work. Each song has its own personality and all together they make a '24 carat' album.

— Rubio, about 24 Kilates.

Paulina Rubio came to peoples' attention in the 1980s when she was part of the popular Mexican group Timbiriche. For a decade she established herself as one of the group's most prominent members, and recorded eleven studio albums. After leaving Timbiriche in 1991, she began planning her first solo musical production, while filming her scenes for soap opera Baila Conmigo. Rubio signed with Capitol Latin in June 1992, and released her debut studio album, La Chica Dorada, on October 20, 1992. Fueled by hit singles "Mío", "Amor de Mujer", "Sabor A Miel", and "Abriendo Las Puertas Al Amor", the album peaked at number one and was one of the best-selling albums of 1993 in her native Mexico, certified triple times gold and platinum and sold over 450,000 copies there. La Chica Dorada helped Rubio launch her career as a pop artist at a time when there was many competitions of artist. According to EMI executives, Rubio became the promise of music in Mexico thanks to the success of her debut album.

After the success of her debut album, in April 1993, Rubio began to develop the recording sessions of her second studio album. In the midst of an extensive promotion through South America, her label prepared some songs with Don Matamoros, C. Sánchez, C. Valle, J.R. Florez, and Freddy Marugan. The concept of the album followed the concept of the "golden girl" as the trademark of Rubio, striving more with the production. Previously, she had announced that the album will take references from the epic space-opera Star Wars. The recording sessions finished on August 17, 1993.

During the filming of the music video for "Nieva, Nieva", lead single from her second studio album, Rubio explaining that the album is a quality collection of "24 karat", therefore, a sequel to her first album.

== Songs ==
"Maldito Amor" is a rock-influenced song that lyrically deals with not getting stuck in a relationship, but that in the end, the love between two lovers is accomplish. "Diamante Puro" follows Rubio's philosophy of trying to look at the better side of things, with lines that evoke Cinderella. The features guitars magnify track, "Nieva, Nieva", tells a story about a girl who took risks and made up her mind to take a change to get an idyllic love, is a pop-rock song with hard guitars and violins instrumentations. It is followed by "Él Me Engañó", a ballad-oriented and string-laden song, in which Rubio realizes her lover cheated on her. The offbeat "Nada Puedes Hacer" contains unusual rhythms, key changes, stuttering guitar sounds, and sad lyricism. The rock song "Los Dioses Se Van" is a fantasy song that describes to the most emblematic monuments of Mexico, such as Diana Cazadora, el Ángel and Cibeles, who flee from a polluted city. Its shows Rubio's view on the environmental issues.

Rubio sings "Asunto De Dos", the seventh track, in a sensual and joyous way. Lyrically, it's about a girl telling her love interest to show himself as he is to win her heart. The beat-driven song, "Compañía", talk about a genuine and lasting friendship. "Vuelve Junto A Mí" discuss relationship problems, and the intention to resume the romance. The melodic "Tú Sólo Tú" talks about charm felt by a woman who feels with a man who is not necessarily her lover. Metaphorically, she describes him as an "open secret" or "one night star". The secuence-ballad, "Corazón Tirano", is the final track on the album. The passionate track includes a production different from the rest of the album, with minimalist instrumentation.

== Singles ==
"Nieva, Nieva", the album's first single release on September 29, 1993, reached number twenty-seven on the US Billboard Hot Latin Tracks, and number one in Mexico. The second single, "Él Me Engañó", released on February 3, 1994, was accompanied by Rubio's first music video with an expensive production, directed by Daniel Gruener. "Asunto De Dos" was the album's third single from the album in Mexico, and was released on June 4, 1994.

"Vuelve Junto A Mí" was a single released only in United States and had a positive commercial performance, peaking at number 20 on the Hot Latin Tracks, without promotion. "Tú Sólo Tú" was released as an airplay single even was planned as the last 24 Kilates's single.

== Critical reception ==
Professional ratings
Review scores
Source	Rating
AllMusic	2/5 stars

Musically, 24 Kilates resumes the similar process and composition of her previous effort. The album, like the previous, was handled by Miguel Blasco and José Ramón Flórez, who had written and produced the entire album, where C. Sánchez, C. Valle and Don Matamoros written the majority the songs. According to AllMusic, 24 Kilates is a latin pop and latin dance album, it's no surprise that sounds very similar to her debut. Which is fine consideration that at the time this formula was pure gold.

In his book La Balada: Un Mensaje Universal by the Colombian writer Carlos Bolívar Ramírez alludes 24 Kilates emphasizing that "Its pop-rock style is very convincing and the poetic lyrics are of good quality".

== Commercial performance ==
24 Kilates reached gold status upon release with pre-sales of over 150,000 copies. Eventually, it sold 300,000 in Mexico and later was certified Platinum there. In US, 24 Kilates received limited promotion and did not appear on any major charts, only their singles "Nieva, Nieva" and "Vuelve Junto A Mi" reached top 30 on the Billboard Hot Latin Tracks.

== Accolades ==
Year	Category	Award	Result
1994	Best Female Artist	ERES Awards	Nominated
1994	Best Concert	ERES Awards	Nominated
1994	Naranja Award	Viña del Mar International Song Festival	Won

== Track listing ==
No.	Title	Writer(s)	Producer(s)	Length
1.	"Maldito Amor"	C. Valle; C. Sánchez	Valle	3:34
2.	"Diamante Puro"	Valle; Sánchez	Valle	4:32
3.	"Nieva, Nieva"	Valle; Sánchez	Valle	3:31
4.	"Él Me Engañó"	Valle; Don Matamoros	Valle; Don Matamoros	4:09
5.	"Nada Puedes Hacer"	Valle; Sánchez; Don Matamoros	Valle; Don Matamoros	4:24
6.	"Los Dioses Se Van"	Valle; Sánchez	Valle	3:25
7.	"Asunto De Dos"	J.R. Florez; Fredy Marugán	J.R. Florez	3:40
8.	"Compañía"	Valle; Sánchez; Don Matamoros	Valle; Don Matamoros	3:58
9.	"Vuelve Junto A Mi"	Valle; Sánchez	Valle	3:35
10.	"Tú Sólo Tú"	Sánchez; Don Matamoros; Paulina Rubio	Don Matamoros	4:01
11.	"Corazón Tirano"	Florez; Marugán	Florez	3:51
Total length:				42:40

== Personnel ==
- Manolo Álvarez - Clarinet, Saxophone
- Andrea Bronston - Backing Vocals
- Doris Cales - Backing Vocals
- Giancarlo Ippolito - Drums
- José Luis - Backing Vocals
- Rafael Martínez - Guitar
- Antonio Pallares - Trombone
- Antonio Ramos - Trumpet
- Paulina Rubio - Vocals
- Luca Rustici - Engineer, Guitar
- Walter Tesoriere - Arranger, Keyboards

=== Technical Personnel ===
- Miguel Blasco - Director, Producer
- Adolfo Pérez Butrón - Artwork, Photography
- Sergio Toporek - Artwork, Graphic Design
- Luca Vittori - Engineer
- Cesar Valle - Assistant Producer, Composer, Production Assistant
- C. Sánchez - Composer
- Don Matamoros - Composer
- José Ramón Flórez - Composer
- Fredi Marugán - Composer
- Adrián Possé - Art Direction, Producer

== Certifications and sales ==
Region	Certification	Certified units/sales
Mexico (AMPROFON)	Platinum	300,000

== See also ==
- 1990s in music
- 1993 in Latin music
- Cultural impact of Star Wars
