= La Chica Dorada =

Studio album by Paulina Rubio
- Released: October 20, 1992
- Recorded: December 1991 – February 1992
- Studios: Balu-Balu (Madrid, Spain)
- Genres: Pop; dance-pop; pop rock
- Length: 37:58
- Label: EMI Capitol de México
- Producers: Miguel Blasco (Exec.); José Ramón Flórez; Gian Pietro Felisatti

Paulina Rubio chronology
La Chica Dorada (1992)	24 Kilates (1993)

Singles from La Chica Dorada
- 1. "Mío" Released: August 30, 1992; 2. "Abriendo las Puertas al Amor" Released: February 20, 1993; 3. "Amor de Mujer" Released: May 29, 1993; 4. "Sabor a Miel" Released: August 12, 1993

La Chica Dorada (English: The Golden Girl) is the debut solo studio album by Mexican singer Paulina Rubio, released on October 20, 1992, by EMI Capitol de México. The album was produced and directed by Miguel Blasco, and written mostly by José Ramón Flórez, Gian Pietro Felisatti and Cesar Valle. Most of the album's composition is primarily "a light and danceable pop", although it includes some elements of pop rock, new jack swing, new wave and a couple of ballads. The album's title has been stuck as Rubio's nickname throughout the Spanish-speaking world ever since.

The album received a mixed reception from music critics. Many applauded the album for its deployment of genres within pop, as well as Rubio's transition "from girl to woman", while others focused heavily on the singer's conceptual image, noting the obvious influence of Marilyn Monroe and Madonna —although her greatest inspiration was Brigitte Bardot—, and thus frowned upon another "Madonna wannabe" in the music industry. Commercially, La Chica Dorada was a success in Latin America and the United States. It peaked at number two on the Billboard Latin Pop Albums, while in Mexico it was certified platinum and three-times gold.

Four singles were released from the album, all of which attained commercial success in the United States. Its lead single "Mío" reached number three on the Billboard Hot Latin Songs, and it was certified gold in Mexico. The subsequent singles in US, "Abriendo las Puertas al Amor" and "Amor de Mujer", both peaked within the top-ten of the chart, while the four and final single, "Sabor a Miel", entered within the top-twenty. La Chica Dorada's commercial success helped Rubio establish herself as a Latin pop idol and launch her recording career.

== Background and development ==
In the 1980s, Rubio established herself as one of the prominent members of the Mexican pop group Timbiriche. She recorded eleven albums overall, of which seven were certified platinum and four were certified gold. When she decided to leave the group In 1990, she tried to set up her solo music career. Meanwhile, Rubio traveled to Europe to study History of Art. Upon her return to Mexico she spoke with her mother, the actress Susana Dosamantes, to support her in financing her first debut album. Rubio traveled to Madrid, Spain in September 1991 to meet up with the 80's and 90's hit-makers producers Miguel Blasco—who began to guide her to establish her solo project—and José Ramón Flórez, and search record labels for a contract. While Rubio recording some songs for her debut solo studio album, she anticipated want to show "fresh music for a very broad market.", and also announced she would film her second telenovela in Mexico, Baila Conmigo.

In mid-1991, Rubio begun to work with Miguel Blasco, and the well-known producers and songwriters, includes Gian Pietro Felisatti (better known as "DiFelisatti") and Cesar Valle, had a good relationship with Rubio, since both writers were responsible for great successes of the band Timbiriche. Added to the above, the Mexican singer and songwriter Aleks Syntek as well was composer for the album. The album was primarily recorded at Balu-Balu Estudios in Madrid, Spain.

In June 1992, Paulina Rubio officially signed a contract with the EMI Capitol label in Mexico and the song "La Chica Dorada" was released on airplay radio in Mexico exclusively to publicize her solo project. The song describes the moments Rubio lived in Spain while studying Art History and dreamed of becoming a Latin pop star.

== Composition ==
La Chica Dorada is primarily a pop and dance-pop record, incorporated new wave music, new jack swing and pop rock styles. Also, it included a couple of ballads. The album's texture has been described as "light." The album opens with "Mío", a "dancefloor thumper" song includes a flamboyant saxophone insert on the bridge and ends with electric guitar riffs. It contains a soul chorus and new wave influences. Lyrically, it "reflected the anxiety of owning everything." The synth arrangements "Dime Si Soy Sexy" notes a girl who is desired by men because of her prominent beauty through a squeaky funny saxophone. "Sabor A Miel" is a sentimental track, talking about a lost love. The romantic ballad song incorporates a waltzing tempo and refined violins. Rubio has cited it as the most personal song on the album.

Written by Aleks Syntek, the guitars-crying style-old West, "El Primer Amor", describing what Rubio is prepared to do for her inexperienced lover, if this one wanna be her first love. The secuence pop-rock style, "Amor De Mujer" describe the feelings and mood of a woman in love. It is considered Rubio's first feminist anthem. It starts with a sequence of hurried keyboards and continues with a rhythm of drums and electric guitars. The beats of both live and programmed drums song "La Escoba" is a studio-live track with audience clapping and whistles originally sung by the Spanish rock group Los Sírex.

Beginning with a guitars riffs introduction, the album title track "La Chica Dorada" is a doo-wop-oriented song. It has harmonies beneath the main chorus, resembles the songs of early Sixties girl groups. The lyrics narrate Rubio's long and winding road to stardom to become "The Golden Girl". The emotional ballad "Abriendo Las Puertas Al Amor" explores Rubio vocal range with a chorus vocal harmonies. It starts like a piano ballad and culminates with light touches of drums. In the new jack swing cut "Sangre Latina", the singer raps narrating a surreal idyll about a walk she takes through various Mexico city locations looking beautiful, capturing the glances and attention of the men, and citing among them renowned cultural figures such as Juan Gabriel, Pancho Villa and Hernán Cortés. The album closes with its tenth track "Amarte En Libertad", a pop-rock with new jack swing and new wave influences.

== Released and promotion ==
The promotion began in July 1992, when Rubio conducted a small advertising campaign by several Mexican media outlets, where she presented her new image as "golden girl" and promoted the song "La Chica Dorada" on some radio stations. The singer made several promotional appearances, including talk shows and live performances in the main cities of Mexico. Paulina Rubio made her debut as a solo singer on the legendary Mexican television program Siempre en Domingo, with Raúl Velasco on October 18, 1992, 3 days before her album was released. With her mother and grandmother in the audience, she performed the song "Amor De Mujer" and her first single, "Mío". Rubio's wearing a gold, glitter mini skirt, cropped top and jacket, while a straight out of a rotating device to begin her performing. The famous television host commented that "it was a great privilege to have presented Paulina as a solo singer". Her presentation had a high audience rating that the next week she was invited again. In United States, for the Spanish-language television program Sábado Gigante, Rubio performed the track "Mío" in January, 1993 and that presentation opened the doors to the Hispanic market in that country. She also appeared on the 1993 Calle Ocho Festival of Miami where performing "Abriendo Las Puertas Al Amor".

Rubio came back to Mexico in March 1993 to perform at the Premios ERES, where she performed "Mío Extended Pop Mix" and "Amor De Mujer The Wedding Dance Mix" in a medley with "Mío" at the 11th TVyNovelas Awards. She received the Female Singer Revelation of the Year award in that ceremony.

=== Singles ===
"La Chica Dorada" was often aired on radio airplay in Mexico for two months to generate interest in the singer and the album. It, however, was only a Mexican release and was not part of her single debut project. "Mío" was serviced as the lead single from the album and featured lyrics written by José Ramón Flórez and Cesar Valle. The producer of the album Miguel Blasco, thought that Paulina should transmit a more sophisticated and sexy image, and that reflected in her debut single. It received positive reviews from music critics and peaked number three on US Billboard Hot Latin Track. Additionally, it became Rubio's first great hit to obtain commercial success in Latin America. "Amor De Mujer", the second single in Mexico released in November 1992, reached number eight in the Hot Latin Tracks. The song established La Chica Dorada's success and was her second number one single in Mexico.

Rubio re-released "Abriendo Las Puertas Al Amor" in April 1993 in Latin America. It was released as the album's second single in US and became the highest entry of the Latin singles chart by a female artist with the singles and debut album. "Sabor A Miel", the fourth single in US, was a success in Mexico, where was number one and was also embraced as a highlight from the album. "Amarte En Libertad" was exclusively released in Latin America as the airplay single in July 1993, and the song was the prelude to Rubio's second album, 24 Kilates, which would be published only 4 months later.

=== Additional releases ===
The first singles of La Chica Dorada were repackaged as a maxi-single album entitled Paulina Rubio in countries like Mexico and Ecuador in 1993, with additional mixes of the singles "Mío" and "Amor De Mujer". In the Ecuador edition it was launched with the promotion of the third single from the album, "Sabor A Miel". The album has been digitally remastered from the original studio tapes. They were available in vinyl, 12" and CD.

== Critical reception ==
Professional ratings
Review scores
Source	Rating
AllMusic	3/5 stars

La Chica Dorada had received mixed reviews from music critics. AllMusic rated it three of five stars, giving it a mixed review and considering the album energetic, exuberant, passionate and intense in the same way Rubio's aesthetic image and personality. Due to the success of "Mío", in Mexico the journalists considered her solo debut as the new "Latin pop icon" and a great business for her label EMI/Capitol Latin.

El País newspaper's Elena Reina wrote in an article that "[Rubio] turn from adolescence to the age of majority to hit new record. If her image had already been important to her career as a child, now [with her debut] it becomes crucial", ultimately concluding that the album was her passage from girl to woman. Catalan music critic and journalist Jordi Bianciotto categorized La Chica Dorada as "a light and danceable pop record" and expressed his "disconcerting version" of "La Escoba", which was originally sung by the Spanish rock group Los Sírex. Similarly to most critics, he highlighted Rubio's commercial success with her debut.

== Commercial performance ==
La Chica Dorada debuted on the U.S. Billboard's Latin Pop Albums chart in January 1993. In its eighth week, it peaked at number two and stayed there for two consecutive weeks. Rubio became the first Mexican female artist to have a successful album with her debut as solo artist on Billboard charts and became the first member of band Timbiriche who managed to enter those lists. La Chica Dorada also peaked at number 42 on the Top Latin Albums chart where it stayed on the charts for 3 weeks.

In Rubio's native country, Mexico, the album enjoyed success, selling over 450,000 copies.

== Accolades ==
Year	Category	Award	Result
1993	Best Music Video for "Mío"	ERES Awards	Nominated
1993	Female Singer Revelation of the Year	TVyNovelas Awards	Won
1993	Youthful Revelation of the Year	El Heraldo de México	Won
1993	Female Artist of the Year, Pop	Lo Nuestro Awards	Nominated
1993	New Pop Artist of the Year	Lo Nuestro Awards	Nominated
1993	Revelation of the Year	Galardon a los Grandes	Won
1993	Performing	AcaFest Music Festival	Won

== Track listing ==
No.	Title	Writer(s)	Producer(s)	Length
1.	"Mío"	J.R. Florez; Cesar Valle	J.R. Florez; Miguel Blasco	3:33
2.	"Dime Si Soy Sexy"	Florez; Valle	Blasco	3:56
3.	"Sabor A Miel"	Florez; Valle	Blasco	3:53
4.	"El Primer Amor"	Aleks Syntek	Blasco	4:06
5.	"Amor De Mujer"	Gian Pietro Felisatti "Difelisatti"; Florez; Valle	Blasco; Florez	3:50
6.	"La Escoba"	Los Sírex	Blasco	2:50
7.	"La Chica Dorada"	Florez; Valle; Paulina Rubio	Florez	3:08
8.	"Abriendo Las Puertas Al Amor"	Difelisatti; Florez; Valle	Blasco	4:38
9.	"Sangre Latina"	Florez; Valle	Blasco	4:50
10.	"Amarte En Libertad"	Difelisatti; Florez; Valle	Blasco	3:15
Total length:				37:59

== Personnel ==
The following people contributed to La Chica Dorada:

- Paulina Rubio – lead vocals, backing vocals, main performer

Additional personnel

- Miguel Blasco – music director, executive producer
- Luis Méndez – A&E
- Remy Causse – arrangements
- J.R. Florez – producer
- José Antonio Álvarez Alija – engineering
- Carlos Latapí L – photography

== Charts ==
Chart (1993)	Peak position
US Latin Pop Albums (Billboard)	2
US Top Latin Albums (Billboard)	42

== Certifications and sales ==
Region	Certification	Certified units/sales
Mexico (AMPROFON)	3× Gold	300,000
Summaries

== Release history ==
Country	Release format	Label
México	CD; LP; Cassette	EMI Capitol de México
United States	CD; Cassette	Capitol/EMI Latin
Canada	CD	Capitol Records
Spain	CD	Virgin Records

== See also ==
- 1990s in music
- 1992 in Latin music
- Honorific nicknames in popular music

== Bibliography ==
- Luna, Iraide (2001), Paulina Rubio "El Huracán Mexicano", Biblioteca Nacional de España: Nuer Ediciones, ISBN 978-84-8068-079-0
