= Movin' Up (song) =

Single by Dreamworld

from the album Heaven Sent
- Released: 1 July 1995
- Recorded: 1995
- Genre: Eurodance
- Length: 3:38
- Label: Rair Records
- Songwriters: Lars Erlandsson, Fredrik Lenander, Bella Morel, David Kreuger, Per Magnusson
- Producers: David Kreuger, Per Magnusson

Dreamworld singles chronology
"Movin' Up" (1995)	"Unreal" (1996)

"Movin' Up" is the debut single from Swedish Eurodance band Dreamworld. It was released in 1995 in Europe and Australia, where it peaked at number 12 on the ARIA Singles Chart. It charted on the US Billboard Dance/Club Play chart for seven weeks, peaking at number 30 in March 1996. It is the best known single from the band and their only international hit. It was re-released in 1997 shortly before the band split up.

In 1996, the song was adapted in Spanish by Mexican singer Paulina Rubio as "Despiértate" and included on her fourth studio album, Planeta Paulina.

The song was covered by Dannii Minogue and released on her 1997 album, Girl.

== Track listings ==
- Swedish CD single
1. "Movin' Up" (Radio Version) — 3:38
2. "Movin' Up" (Extended Version) — 5:47
3. "Movin' Up" (The Elephant Mix) — 5:36
- Australian CD single
1. "Movin' Up" — 3:38
2. "Movin' Up" (P.G. Tips Satellite Mix) — 6:32
3. "Movin' Up" (The Party Faithful Mix) — 6:09
4. "Movin' Up" (Elephant Mix) — 5:36
5. "Movin' Up" (Empire State Mix) — 5:49
- US CD maxi
1. "Movin' Up" (Extended Version) — 5:47
2. "Movin' Up" (Lenny Bertoldo Club Mix) — 6:39
3. "Movin' Up" (Lenny Bertoldo Extended Mix) — 5:57
4. "Movin' Up" (PG Tips Satellite Mix) — 8:26

== Charts and sales ==
=== Weekly charts ===
Chart (1995–1996)	Peak position
Australia (ARIA)	12
Sweden (Sverigetopplistan)	17
UK Pop Tip Club Chart (Music Week)	9
US Dance Club Songs (Billboard)	30

=== Year-end charts ===
Chart (1996)	Peak position
Australia (ARIA)	78

=== Certifications ===
Region	Certification	Certified units/sales
Australia (ARIA)	Gold	35,000^{^}
^{^} Shipments figures based on certification alone.
