= Los Mustang =

Spanish rock band

Los Mustang is a Spanish rock band from Barcelona formed in the 1960s originally made up of Santiago "Santi" Carulla (vocals), Marco Rossi (solo guitar), Antonio "Toni" Mercadé (acoustic guitar and vocals), Miguel Navarro (bass and vocals) and Antonio "Tony" Mier (drums). They are best known for their Spanish language covers of songs from the 1960s and the 1970s.

== Career ==
The young musicians met at San Carlos Club. Three of them (Marco Rossi, Miguel Navarro and Antonio Mercadé) were members of the group Poble-sec. Los Mustang were inspired by the style of The Shadows. With the inclusion of Santi Carulla (from rival group Los Sírex) as lead singer, the group gained fame in Barcelona with an image of professionalism and cover interpretation of international hits.

In October 1962, Los Mustang recorded their debut album on EMI-Odeon, featuring cover versions of popular songs like "Quinientas Millas", Peter, Paul and Mary's "500 Miles", Johnny Hallyday's "Madison Twist", and Spanish songs "He de saber" and "No lo ves". Their repertoire consisted of many Spanish-interpreted foreign hits, but also included several original Spanish songs.

In 1963 they released four EPs, featuring the sound effects instrumental Telstar from The Tornados. They also released successful versions of French hits like "Capri se acabó" (Hervé Vilard's "Capri c'est fini"), "Mi Vida" (cover of Alain Barrière hit "Ma vie"), "El Mundo" (based on Jimmy Fontana hit "Il mondo") and many songs from The Beatles. 1964 followed with versions from The Beatles' "Please Please Me", "Conocerte Mejor" ("I Should Have Known Better" cover), "Nadie Respondió" ("No Reply" cover), and "Un Billete Compró" ("Ticket to Ride" cover). However, their best-known song is a version of "Yellow Submarine" entitled "Submarino Amarillo" that sold more than 130,000 copies just in Spain. In 1966, they took the trophy for best band at a music festival.

In the 1970s Los Mustang continued to record covers. They released the critically acclaimed Reino Prohibido Del Himalaya (meaning Himalayan Forbidden Kingdom) in 2 parts, in line with the psychedelic trend. It consisted of conceptual songs about earlier advanced civilizations, based on the theories of Hanns Hörbiger and Michel Peissel. They also toured in Cuba, but by 1973 their contract with EMI had expired and their output declined.

During the 1980s, they experienced a revival with the recording of a new album which once again included versions of oldies and had various performances with arch-rivals Los Sírex. In 2000, they released a special album to celebrate 40 years of the band, collaborating with artists Luis Eduardo Aute, Dyango, El Dúo Dinámico, Cliff Richard and Jimmy Fontana.
