= Nieva, Nieva =

1993 single by Paulina Rubio

- Remix cover art

Single by Paulina Rubio

from the album 24 Kilates
- Released: September 29, 1993
- Recorded: Estudios Balu-Balu (Madrid, Spain)
- Genre: Pop rock
- Length: 3:31
- Label: EMI Capitol
- Songwriters: C. Valle; C. Sánchez; C. Sánchez
- Producer: Miguel Blasco

Paulina Rubio singles chronology
"Sabor a Miel" (1993)	"Nieva, Nieva" (1993)	"Él Me Engañó" (1994)

Music video
- "Nieva, Nieva" on YouTube

"Nieva, Nieva" (English: "Snowing, Snowing") is a song performed by the Mexican singer Paulina Rubio, written by Cesar Valle and C. Sánchez and produced by Miguel Blasco. The song was recorded in Madrid, Spain, through the promotion of Rubio's debut album, La Chica Dorada and the recording sessions for her second album. It was eventually released as the lead single from her second studio album 24 Kilates on September 29, 1993.

The song received positive reviews from most music critics, who considered it stood out on the album and praised it as a strong single. Commercially, "Nieva, Nieva" was a success, reaching number-one in Mexico and becoming popular on television music videos. It also became Rubio's fifth song to feature on Billboard Hot Latin Tracks chart.

According to El Siglo de Torreón, "Nieva, Nieva" is one of the 10 hits that has defined Rubio's musical career. In 2022, Revista ERES named the song as one of the "5 greatest hits of 1994 in Mexico".

== Reception ==
=== Critical response ===
For the 24 Kilates record, the songs features brushed guitars magnify, especially the heartbreak of "Nieva, Nieva"; lyrics such as "Nieva, Nieva en mi primavera / Un mundo irreal" sound to fantasize with someone who is out of reach, not defiant. The Colombian writer Carlos Bolívar Ramírez in his book La Balada: Un Mensaje Universal was very positive towards the song, writing that "Her pop-rock style is very convincing and lyric poetry is good quality".

=== Chart performance and success ===
In September 1993, "Nieva, Nieva" was released in Mexico. The song became Rubio's first song to peak at #1 on the Mexico Singles Chart, and it became the #2 song played on the music videos channel TeleHit in February 1994. On the year-end by the TeleHit chart, "Nieva, Nieva" also reached the top 20.

The song was also successful and popular beyond Mexico. It reached number eight in San Salvador as well as the top thirty on the US Billboard Hot Latin Tracks.

"Nieva, Nieva," along with "Mío" and "Amor de Mujer," is considered one of the songs that marked a generation in Mexico during the 1990s, according to El Siglo de Torreón.

== Music video ==
Directed by Ángele Flores and filmed in September 1993 in Los Angeles, California, some of the locations where the "Nieva, Nieva" video was in "You Are The Star" mural, painted by Tom Suriya, on a wall in the Hollywood section. The video showed Rubio in various costumes with her dancers in front of different backdrops. Some of the outfits are typical of a woman in the 1990s, while others are dresses inspired by mythology and other eras. The "Nieva, Nieva" music video was nominated the "Most Popular Music Video" at the Premios Eres held in 1994 in Mexico.

The music video sets out to depict the song's lyrics and also to show Paulina Rubio's evolution as a singer in her second album 24 Kilates: she is still a golden girl, with the same dreams but stronger this time. In one scene from the video, Paulina observes the face of Marilyn Monroe as she passes through the mural "You Are The Star," reaffirming her strong inspiration from the Hollywood actress.

== In popular culture ==
The song is mentioned in the Latin American dub of the anime Pokémon in one episode, in which James of Team Rocket alludes a fragment of the song, saying: "Nieva, Nieva, en mi primavera."

== Credits and personnel ==
- Paulina Rubio - lead vocals
- C. Valle - Composer, Songwriter, Producer
- C. Sánchez/C-Sánchez - Composer, Songwriter
- Miguel Blasco - Music director, Executive producer
- Walter Tesorierie - Arrangement

== Charts ==
=== Weekly charts ===
Chart (1993–1994)	Maxim position
Mexico Top Airplay (Notitas Musicales)	1
US Billboard Hot Latin Tracks	27

== See also ==
- List of number-one hits of 1994 (Mexico)

== Bibliography ==
- Bolívar Ramírez, Carlos (2001), La Balada: Mensaje Universal, Cali, Colombia: Lito Cóndor, ISBN 978-95-8332-684-4
