= Dreamworld (band) =

Swedish Eurodance band

- Origin: Malmö, Sweden
- Genres: Eurodance
- Years active: 1995–1997
- Labels: RAIR
- Members: Bella Morel, Fredrik Lenander, Lars Erlandsson

Dreamworld were a Swedish Eurodance group consisting of Bella Morel, Fredrik Lenander and Lars Erlandsson. The band were based in Malmö. The voice of Dreamworld was the female vocalist Bella Morel. She was also involved in writing lyrics. All their CDs were released under the label RAIR (Air Chrysalis).

== Biography ==
Dreamworld are best known for their 1995 debut single "Movin' Up”. The song was a pop hit in both Sweden and Australia, where the single was certified gold. “Movin' Up” was also a club hit in Europe and the USA, where it peaked at number 30 on the dance chart. It has since been covered by Dannii Minogue (for her "Girl" album) and by Mexican artist Paulina Rubio (as "Despiertate" on her "Planeta Paulina" album).

In October 1995 came their second single "Unreal". The music video for the single was directed by Patric Ullaeus. A remix CD entitled "The Unreal Remixes" was released later. Their only album, Heaven Sent, was released in 1996. Their two last singles "Everytime I Fall (For Your Eyes)" and "Holdin' On" were less successful.

In 1997, the group decided to stop the band project and they created their own production team, Dreamworld Productions. A*Teens, Supernatural, Lucy Street, Dannii Minogue, Mirah, Infernal, Carina, Paulina Rubio and Jeans were some of the artists that recorded songs written by Dreamworld Productions. They have produced or made remixes for Cartoons, Tiggy, and Los Umbrellos as well.

== Discography ==
=== Albums ===
List of albums, with selected chart positions
Title	Album details	Peak chart positions
Title	Album details	AUS
Heaven Sent	Released: 1996; Format: CD; Label: Rair Records / Echo	141

=== Singles ===
Year	Single	Peak chart positions			Certifications	Album
Year	Single	SWE	AUS	US Dance	Certifications	Album
1995	"Movin' Up"	17	12	30	ARIA: Gold	Heaven Sent
1995	"Unreal"	25	106	—		Heaven Sent
1996	"Everytime I Fall (For Your Eyes)"	—	125	—		Heaven Sent
1996	"Holdin' On"	—	—	—		Heaven Sent
"—" denotes releases that did not chart
