= Los Sírex =

Spanish rock band

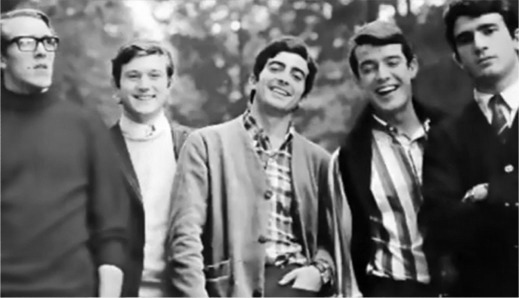
Los Sírex in 1965

Los Sírex is a Spanish rock band founded in 1959 in Barcelona and active until 1972. In 1977 they got together again and were active until 2012. It was initially formed by three members: Guillermo Rodríguez Holgado, Antonio Miers and Manuel Madruga (Manolo), then briefly joined by the vocalist Santi Carulla in 1960. By the end of 1960, the band consisted of Antoni Miquel Cerveró ("Leslie" or "L'Anxoveta") as lead vocalist, Lluís Gomis (Lluís Gomis de Prunera, 1944-2012) on the drums, Josep Fontseré Portolés (Pepe or Pep, Barcelona, 1945) on the rhythm guitar, Guillermo Rodríguez Holgado on the bass and Manolo Madruga (d. 2012) on the lead guitar. They named the band after a component of eyeglasses: Guillermo worked at his father's glasses factory, where they used a filament called Sírex to adjust the lenses to the frames of the glasses. They became identified with a pure rock and roll style with daring lyrics that caused them trouble with the Spanish censorship of the time. They sang in Spanish.

Los Sírex top singles in the 1960s include "La escoba", "Que se mueran los feos", "El tren de la costa" and "¡Qué bueno, qué bueno!". From their come back in the 1980s, "Esto si me altera el cuerpo" and "Maldigo mi destino" made their way to the Spain top 20.

== Biography ==
Their training began in June 1959 in Barcelona, when three friends and neighbors living on Gran Via street (Guillermo Rodríguez Holgado, Antonio Miers and Manolo Madruga, 15–17 years old at the time) decided to play music under the influence of Elvis Presley. To complete their apprenticeship, they often listen other bands at the Spanish University Union (Spanish: Sindicato Español Universitario) on Canuda street or at the CAPSA theatre on Aragon Street, where other groups like Estrellas Fugaces or Los Cocodrilos played. In 1960, Santi Carulla, a classmate of Guillermo, briefly joined the band before moving on to be the lead singer of the rival band Los Mustang: both bands participated in a contest for young talents on Ràdio Barcelona, after which the rival band asked Carulla to be their singer. The first performance of Los Sirex was at a Barça football fan club (Penya barcelonista) at Caspe Street. That was followed by concerts at the "Tropical" club in Castelldefels. After Carulla left, Antoni Miquel Cerveró, from the band Los Meteors, joined as lead singer, and Josep Fontseré joined as rhythm guitarist, forming the lineup for the band's 1960s success period.

== Discography ==
Source :

=== Albums ===
- Sírex, (1978)
- Ni Más ni Menos, (1980)
- A tu Aire, (1982)
- Madrid, Madrid, (1984)
- 25 Años, (1987)
- 9 de Cada 10 Estrellas Bailan Rock, (1994)

=== Compilations ===
- Los Sírex, (1965)
- 21 Años de Sírex, (1981)
- Los Sírex. Singles Collection, (2001)
- Todos sus Singles en Vergara y Ariola, (2002)
- Todos sus EPs en Discos Vergara, (2002)

=== Singles and EPs ===
- "Muchacha Bonita" / "Da Doo Ron Ron" / "Si de mí te Alejas" / "Twist and Shout" (Note: Spanish version), (1964)
- "Si Tuviera un Martillo" ("If I Had a Hammer" cover) / "Quiero Ser Dichoso" / "Nobody but You" / "Please Please me", (1964)
- "Ciao, Amigo" / "Jambalaya" / "Que te Deje de Querer" / "Motivo de Amor", (1964)
- "Los Sírex Interpretan sus Propias Canciones", (1964)
- "La Escoba" / "Cantemos", (1965)
- "Enseñándote a Amar" / "Sin tus Cartas" / "La Noche Es Maravillosa" / "No Volveré a Llorar por ti", (1965)
- "La Escoba" / "¡Qué Haces Aquí!" / "El Tren de la Costa" / "Cantemos", (1965)
- "Que se Mueran los Feos" / "Has de Ser mi Mujer" / "Culpable" / "El Tranvía", (1965)
- "Que Bueno, Que Bueno" / "Chao Chao", (1965)
- "Lo Sabes" / "Siempre te Retrasas" / "Cuanto más Lejos Estoy" / "Todas las Mañanas", (1966)
- "Olvídame" / "Solo en la Playa" / "Yo Grito" / "Reprise", (1966)
- "Yo Soy Napoleón" / "Hoy Es Fiesta" / "Tiempo Perdido" / "Natacha", (1966)
- "Hits", (1966)
- "El Mundo en Navidad" / "Estrella Fugaz", (1966)
- "Brindis" / "Tus Recuerdos", (1967)
- "Acto de Fuerza", (1967)
- "De Aquí para Allá", (1967)
- "Fire (Fuego)" / "Yo Soy Tremendo", (1968)
- "La Ratita" / "Alrededor del Reloj" / "¡Hey, Susana!" / "El Pequeño Sebastián", (1968)
- "Hay una Montaña" / "Judy con Disfraz", (1968)
- "La Mitad del Paraíso" / "Soy la Hierba que tú Pisas", (1969)
- "Tu Nombre en las Paredes", (1969)
- "No, a mí, no" / "Debes Saber", (1970)
- "Angelina", (1970)
- "La Escoba", (1972)
- "Maldigo mi Destino", (1980)
- "Si te Vas" / "No Está todo Perdido", (1980)
- "Champú", (1981)
- "Quiero que lo Pases Bien", (1982)
- "Madrid, Madrid (Me Desesperas)", (1984)
- "Hay que Cantar", (1987)
