= Abriendo las puertas al amor =

Single by Paulina Rubio

from the album La Chica Dorada
- Released: February 20, 1993
- Studio: Balu-Balu (Madrid, Spain)
- Genre: Pop; ballad
- Length: 4:40
- Label: Capitol, EMI Latin
- Songwriters: José Ramón Florez; Gian Pietro Felisatti
- Producer: J.R. Flórez

Paulina Rubio singles chronology
"Mío" (1992)	"Abriendo las puertas al amor" (1993)	"Amor de Mujer" (1993)

Audio video
- "Abriendo Las Puertas Al Amor" on YouTube

"Abriendo Las Puertas Al Amor" (English: "Opening The Doors To Love") is a song by Mexican singer Paulina Rubio, written by José Ramón Flórez and Gian Pietro Felisatti, from her debut album La Chica Dorada (1992). It was released as the second single in United States on February 20, 1993 by Capitol Latin. Producer J.R. Flórez, along with music director Miguel Blasco, decided to create for Rubio a piano ballad, using her particular vocal range.

The song was intended to be released as the fourth single from La Chica Dorada, but due to the success and longevity of Rubio's massive selling in America over 1992 and the following new year, it was released in a handful of countries. In the United States, "Abriendo Las Puertas Al Amor" reached the top ten of the Billboard Hot Latin Songs chart, market even though there was no video filmed to promote the song.

Also a favourite track among EMI Capitol label, the song also featured on the 1994 US compilation album Ricardo Montaner y Sus Amigos, one of just ten tracks included that were re-release as a single in the US.

== Chart performance ==
"Abriendo Las Puertas Al Amor" debuted at top ten on the Mexican Singles Chart, where it peaked for one week. In February 1993, the song debuted at number twenty-eight on the U.S. Billboard Hot Latin Songs chart as a "power track", managing to peak inside the top ten on May 8, 1993. The song spent a total of thirteen weeks on the chart and was the second Rubio's song on the top ten. It also peaked at number nine in Panama.

== Live performances ==
Rubio performed "Abriendo Las Puertas Al Amor" at the Calle Ocho Festival in Miami, Florida, in early 1993. The song was also performed at the Antena 3 television show Vive El Verano in Spain, on which she was a presenter in 1998.

== Formats ==
US CD single

1. "Abriendo Las Puertas Al Amor" – 4:38

== Credits and personnel ==
- Paulina Rubio – lead vocals
- Gian Pietro Felisatti – composer, writer
- José Ramón Flórez – composer, writer
- Miguel Blasco – music director, producer
- Remy Causse – arranger
- José Antonio Álvarez Alija – engineer

== Charts ==
Chart (1993)	Maxim position
US Hot Latin Songs (Billboard)	9
