= Vuelve Junto a Mí =

1994 single by Paulina Rubio

"Vuelve Junto A Mi"

Single by Paulina Rubio

from the album 24 Kilates
- Released: March 1994
- Recorded: Estudios Balu-Balu (Madrid, Spain)
- Genre: Latin pop
- Length: 3:31
- Label: EMI Capitol
- Songwriters: Cesar Valle; Carlos Sánchez
- Producer: Cesar Valle

Paulina Rubio singles chronology
"Él Me Engañó" (1994)	"Vuelve Junto A Mi" (1994)	"Asunto De Dos" (1994)

Audio video
- "Vuelve Junto A Mí" on YouTube

"Vuelve Junto A Mi" (English: "Come Back Next To Me") is a song performed by the Mexican singer Paulina Rubio written by Carlos Sánchez and Cesar Valle with the latter also producing the song. The song was released in March 1994 as the third single from Rubio's second studio album 24 Kilates.

== Commercial performance ==
In the U.S., the song peaked at number 20 on the Billboard Hot Latin Tracks, becoming her fourth song to reach the top 20. The song also reached number four in Panama.

== Track listing ==
Mexican CD single

1. "Vuelve Junto A Mí"

== Credits and personnel ==
- Paulina Rubio – lead vocals
- C. Valle – Composer, songwriter, Producer
- C. Sánchez-C-Sánchez – Composer, songwriter
- Miguel Blasco – Music director, executive producer
- Walter Tesorierie – Arrangement
- Adrian Pose – Art director
- Andrea Bronston – Backing vocalist
- Doris Cales – Backing vocalist
- José Luis – Backing vocalist

== Charts ==
Chart (1994)	Peak position
US Hot Latin Songs (Billboard)	20
