= Calle Ocho Festival =

Music festival in Miami, Florida, US

Coordinates: 25.7655°N 80.2266°W

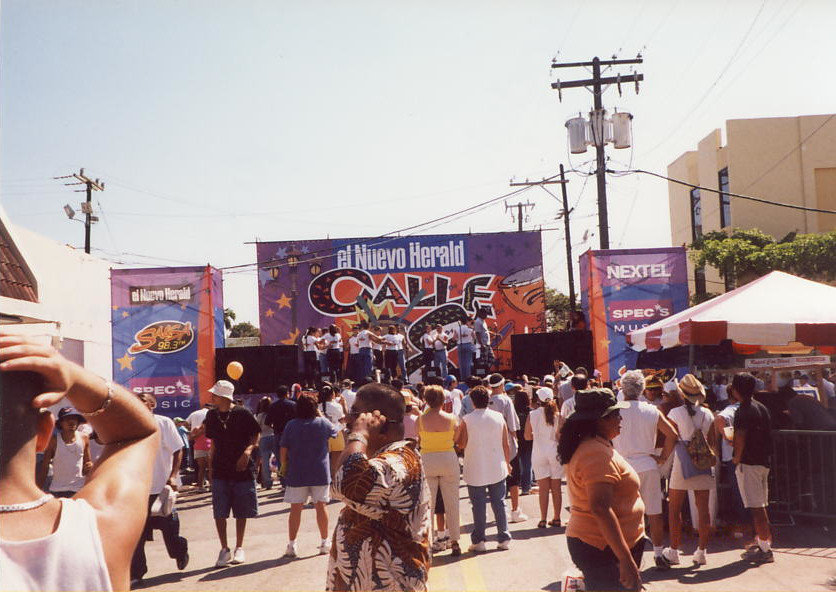
Calle-ocho-festival-2001

The Calle Ocho Music Festival (Festival de la Calle Ocho) is a one-day street festival closing out Carnaval Miami. It takes place in March in the Little Havana neighborhood of Miami, Florida, between SW 12th Avenue and 27th Avenue on SW 8th Street.

The festival is one of the largest in the world, and over one million visitors attend the Calle Ocho event. Showcasing Latin American and Caribbean culture, Calle Ocho is the largest Hispanic street festival in the United States. Started by Cuban exiles in 1978, the festival attracts over a million people a year.

== History ==
Calle Ocho started in 1978 as a way for Cuban immigrants to express themselves and educate South Floridians about their culture in their community. The festival's focus grew to include participation from all Latin American countries.

In 1996, the festival was cancelled due to the shooting down of four Cuban exile aviators by Cuban warplanes on February 24, 1996. The aviators were part of the Brothers to the Rescue organization. In 2020–2021, the festival was suspended due to the COVID-19 pandemic.

On March 6, 2020, Miami mayor Francis Suarez and two other city officials announced during a press conference that the Miami municipal government denied Calle Ocho organizers a permit to hold a festival in 2020 following health concerns during the COVID-19 pandemic; the 43rd festival returned in 2022 after a two-year hiatus.

== Program ==
The annual festival shuts down 15 street blocks of SW 8th Street in order to host dancing, food, drinks and 30 stages of live entertainment.

The stages are located throughout Little Havana, and host a variety of Latin music genres from Latin America and the Caribbean, from merengue to top 40 pop music.

Carnaval Miami is organized and sponsored by the Kiwanis Club of Little Havana.

The stages represent major national radio and television networks, such as Univision. In 2019, Univisión featured breakout urban music artist Mando el Pelado, a New Yorker with Ecuadorian roots, who represented the Ecuadorian communities living in Miami.

== Recognitions ==
In 1988, the festival set the Guinness World Record with 119,986 people in the world's longest conga line.

In 1990, a world-record-breaking 10,000-pound piñata was featured.

In 2000, the Guinness World Record was set for the world's longest cigar.

In 2008, Calle Ocho broke the record for the most domino players at the event.

In 2010, the Florida legislature identified the Calle Ocho-Open House 8 festival as an official state festival.

In 2012, the festival broke the world record for the largest flag image ever created. The flag measured 250 feet long and 36 feet wide, and was marched down the street by over 100 volunteers.
