= Revista ERES =

Mexican magazine

Revista ERES or ERES Magazine was a publication in Mexico. it was released also in some Latin American countries and Latin USA markets. It was published by Editorial Televisa, from Televisa Group.The magazine was published between 1988 and 2012. Its slogan was "¿y Tú quien eres?" ("And who are you?"). The fortnightly magazine was directed at adolescents and young people, with topics of interest such as music, film, television, fashion, advice, test, support and interviews. Each cover usually consisted of two artists.

== The Beginning ==
The idea for the magazine came in 1988, from Editorial Televisa, looking for a magazine focused on young audiences. For presentation campaigned on TV with the usual slogan "¿Y tú quien eres?"("And who are you?") with two shades of the first artists to cover the debut. The first issue appeared on September 16, 1988, taking cover Sasha Sökol and Luis Miguel, two of the young stars of the moment. The publication was characterized by putting on the cover two artists (mainly singers, but also actors, athletes and models), most of the time a man and a woman, although there were also the inclusion of entire groups, although initially only put one or two members. Each issue was eagerly awaited by the public, at a time when the Internet did not exist, the magazines were one of the sources to learn more about the favorite artists. During the late 80s, the publication found an important niche and grew. Artists like most of the members of the group Timbiriche appeared in the first covers.

== 1990s ==
Starting the 90s, the publication grew readership. In 1990 was introduced Special Music every six months, where they made a musical summary of the top albums, songs and artists. These issues did not have to cover any particular artist in his first numbers, it was just a collage of several ones. Eventually over the years they changed and included a single artist or group in front, highlighting the end of the 1990s and early 2000s international artists such as Garbage, Metallica, Green Day, Hanson, Alanis Morissette, Britney Spears, Backstreet Boys, Spice Girls or Jon Bon Jovi. Other special and Beauty editions for men and women, weddings, etc. were performed. During the 90s several Latin artists who were beginning to dawn appeared on the cover, such as Shakira, Ricky Martin, Alejandro Sanz, Enrique Iglesias, Mónica Naranjo or La Ley. While national artists and bands like Caifanes, Paulina Rubio, Thalía, Fey, Maná, Alejandra Guzmán, Gloria Trevi, among others, used to appear frequently. Luis Miguel used to appear in numbers anniversary and was the artist with the most appearances in the publication, although from his fourth title and came unaccompanied. among others.

The image of the magazine was renewed every good time, keeping it cool. In 1991 introduced the Premios ERES (ERES Awards), which rewarded the best of music and television, at the time also the best of theater, film, radio and even ads. The nominees were chosen by readers and published a month before the awards. The awards were broadcast on television, and included live performances. The latest awards were presented in 2001. Prior to the first delivery, the group Caló and Sasha Sökol recorded "Eres", the official theme of the magazine and the prizes; which later was released for sale.

== The 2000s and the end ==
The magazine started the new millennium remaining as one of the leading magazines among Mexican youth, but the new offering of youth magazines gradually affecting it, also increased access to internet in Mexico and new consumer trends population took their toll. Premios ERES stopped the Awards delivered in 2001. The ever-changing image that the magazine managed to survive until its last edition in December 2012, whose cover was the singer María José and Dan Masciarelli. And they culminated 24 years of a magazine that left its mark on the Mexican celebrities. ERES Niños publication first appeared in 2000, still it continues to be published.

== Commemorative Editions ==
- No. 1 Sasha and Luis Miguel
- First Anniversary: Luis Miguel and Thalía
- No. 100 Collage with a bumber 100
- No. 200 Toy figures with the names of the magazine contributors
- No. 300 Paulina Rubio
- Last Release: María José and Dan Masciarelli
