= Asunto de Dos =

"Asunto De Dos"

Single by Paulina Rubio

from the album 24 Kilates
- Released: June 4, 1994
- Recorded: Estudios Balu-Balu (Madrid, Spain)
- Genre: Latin pop; Pop rock
- Length: 3:42
- Label: EMI Capitol
- Songwriters: J.R. Flórez; Fredi Marugán
- Producer: Miguel Blasco

Paulina Rubio singles chronology
"Vuelve Junto A Mi" (1994)	"Asunto De Dos" (1994)	"Te Daría Mi Vida" (1995)

Music video
- "Asunto De Dos" on YouTube

"Asunto De Dos" (English: "Matter Of Two") is a pop-rock song written by José Ramón Flórez and Fredi Marugán, and produced by Miguel Blasco for Mexican singer Paulina Rubio's second studio album, 24 Kilates (1993). The song was released as the four and last single off the album by EMI Latin on une 4, 1994. It peaked at number twelve on the Mexican Singles Chart.

"Asunto De Dos" was later included for several Rubio's compilation album.

== Background ==
"Asunto De Dos" was Rubio's third single from her second studio album 24 Kilates (1993) in Mexico. In US it was intended to be the third worldwide single release from the album but was cancelled in favour of "Vuelve Junto A Mí". Eventually, the song was released in the United States, but did not generate much success.

This single was heavily promoted on Mexico TV while Rubio was recording her third studio album El Tiempo Es Oro (1995) shortly after completing work on her first feature film Bésame En La Boca.

== Music video ==
The music video shows Paulina in different outfits and a natural make up. The video was directed by Tito Lara.

== Usage in media ==
The song was used for the Spotify playlist of the Mexican television series La Casa de las Flores in 2019 and in one of the episodes, an impersonating drag queen of Rubio performs the song.

== Formats ==
Mexican CD single

1. "Asunto De Dos" – 3:46

== Credits and personnel ==
- Paulina Rubio – lead vocals
- J.R. Florez – Composer, songwriter, Producer
- Fredy Marugan – Composer, songwriter
- Miguel Blasco – Music director, executive producer
- Walter Tesorierie – Arrangement

== Charts ==
Chart (1994)	Peak position
Mexico Top Airplay (Notitas Musicales)	12
