= Mío =

- Artwork for 'Paulina Rubio' EP

Single by Paulina Rubio

from the album La Chica Dorada
- B-side: "Amor de Mujer"; "Sabor a Miel"
- Released: August 30, 1992
- Recorded: 1991
- Studio: Estudios Balu-Balu (Madrid, Spain)
- Genre: Dance-pop; new wave
- Length: 3:46
- Label: EMI Latin
- Songwriters: José Ramón Flórez; César Valle
- Producers: J.R. Flórez; Miguel Blasco

Paulina Rubio singles chronology
"Mío" (1992)	"Abriendo Las Puertas Al Amor" (1993)

Music video
- "Mío" on YouTube

"Mío" (English: "Mine") is the debut solo single by Mexican singer Paulina Rubio from her first solo album La Chica Dorada (1992). It was written by José Ramón Flórez and Cesar Valle and produced by Miguel Blasco and J.R. Florez. After recording and sending a demo tape, Rubio signed a multi-album deal with EMI Capitol de México in June 1992. "Mío" is a dance-pop song that refers to a girl's passionate feelings.

"Mío" was released on August 30, 1992, through EMI Mexico as the album's lead single. It reached number one in at least 12 countries, including Mexico, where it earned gold certification and became the country's best-selling song of 1993. An accompanying music video, directed by Ángel Flores, portrays Rubio as a young femme fatale which is filmed by her crush, and starts to daydream that she is singing and dancing around him, while watching her love interest from afar. It was also nominated for Favorite Video at the 1993 ERES Awards. "Mío" is one of the most emblematic songs of the 90s in Spanish, according to VH1 Latin America.

In the United States, the song reached the number 3 on the Billboard Hot Latin Tracks and stayed there for four consecutive weeks. Thanks to the success of the song, "Mío" is considered one of the best songs in the 1990s in Mexico, while it is considered Paulina's biggest hit during the decade.

According to the media and fans, "Mío" has been considered Paulina Rubio's signature song. To commemorate Rubio's lasting impact on the industry and her 25 years of career, Lucas Villa of AXS considered "Mío" 10 of her best singles. He said "is quintessential '90s and, most importantly, signature Paulina Rubio"

== Background and development ==
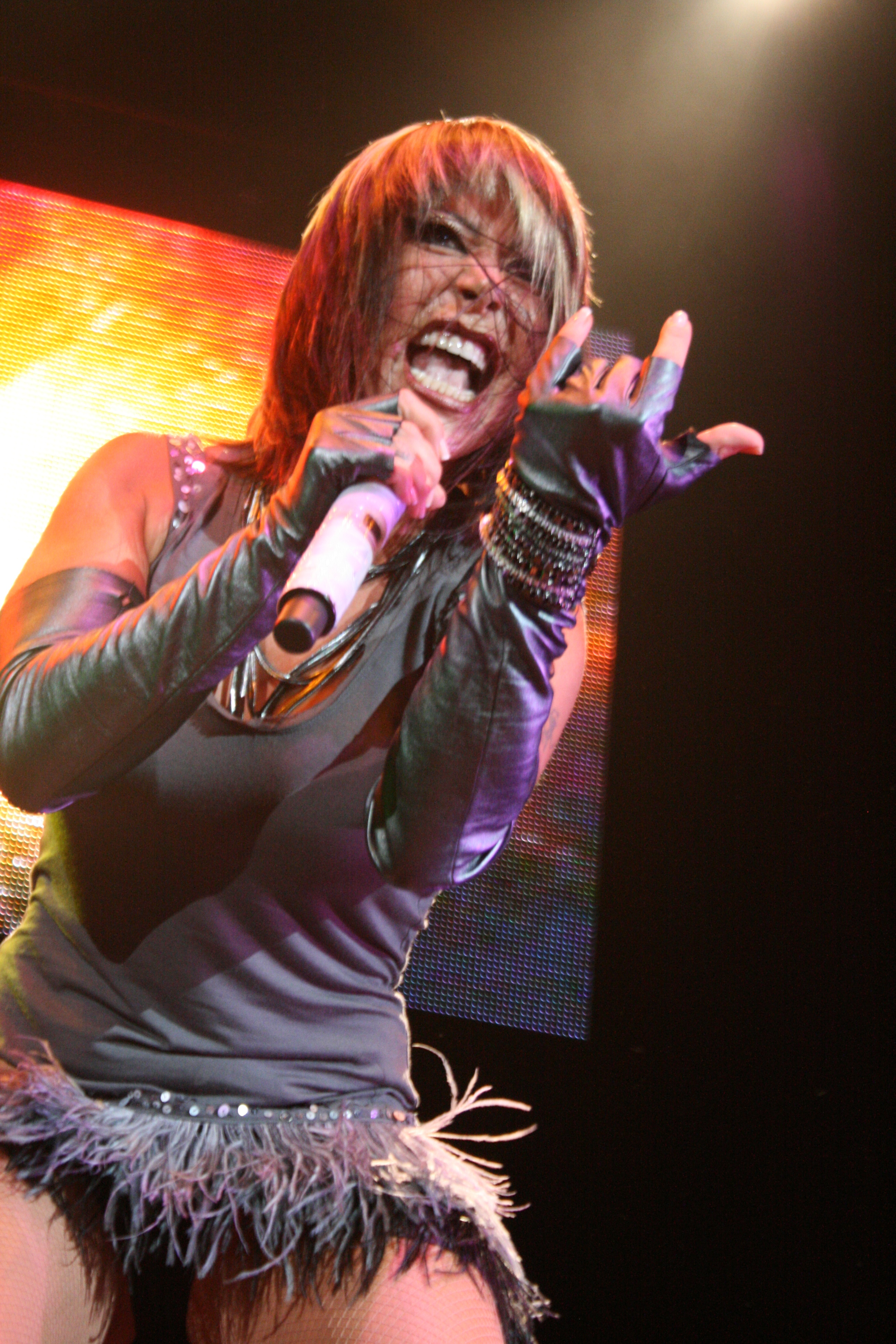
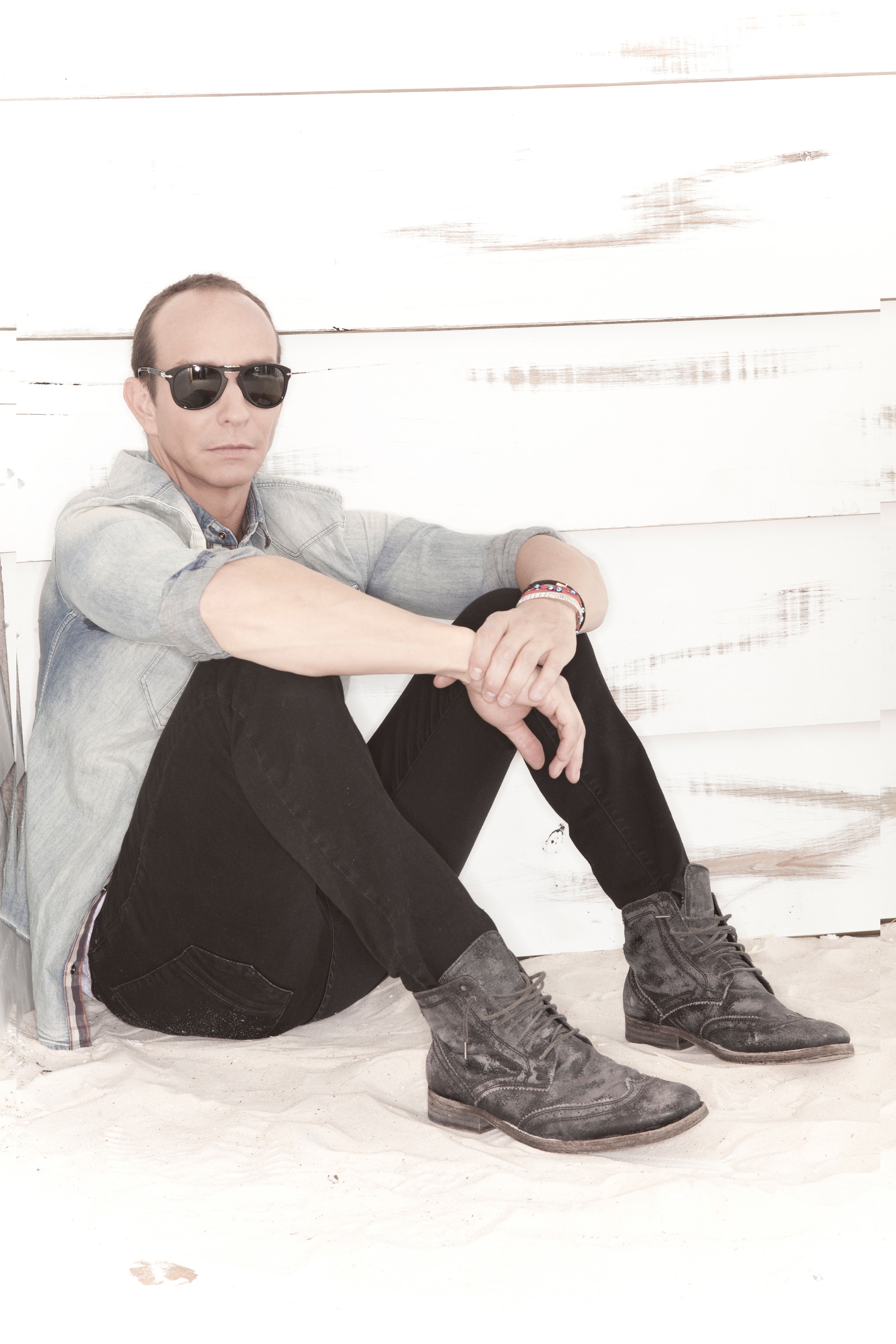
Alejandra Guzmán (left) and Erik Rubin (right) who inspired the song "Mío".

After previous early success with Timbiriche, recording ten studio albums, among them Timbiriche 7 (1987), which is considered one of the best-selling albums in Mexico, Rubio initially traveled to London, England to study. However, her plans changed when she repeatedly visited Madrid, Spain. There she began to surround herself with well-known people from the music scene, including Miguel Blasco, José Ramón Flórez, César Valle and Gian Pietro Felisatti, a successful Spanish production and writing team. They knew little about Rubio and knew that she wanted to make her solo debut; as a result, they wrote several clichéd pop songs for her in late 1991, including the song "La Chica Dorada," which reflected Rubio's wishes to become a music star.

Blasco and Flórez were known in Mexico for writing for other female singers such as Yuri, Lucero and Alejandra Guzmán. Flórez also wrote the song "Hey Güera" by Guzmán, dedicated to Rubio because she had come between Guzmán's relationship and Erik Rubin, who at the time was her boyfriend. The press in Mexico began to talk about the scandal and the third indiscurrence awarded to Rubio; a love triangle that has been part of pop culture in Mexico. For her part, Blasco already knew about the subject and had produced some Guzmán albums.

In response to Guzmán, Rubio asked Flórez and Valle to write the response to "Hey Güera." At her request, they wrote "Mío". Rubio recorded the song at the Balu-Balu Studios in Madrid in late 1991 and early 1992 and at the end of the recording session for the album he returned to Mexico to continue working on the Televisa telenovela, Baila Conmigo.

In June 1992, Rubio signed with EMI Capitol to release her first album and "Mío" was released August 30, 1992.

== Composition ==
"Mío" is a dance-pop song with elements of new jack swing and new wave, that lasts for three minutes and forty five seconds. The song's instrumentation features synthesizers, keyboards and electric guitars. Has a soul-influenced chorus and includes a saxophone insert on the bridge. The song is composed in the key of G major with a tempo of 120 beats per minute. As for the lyrics, according to several entertainment journalists, "Mío" contains concrete, direct and elegant phrases. In some lines Rubio interprets herself as a feline.

== Reception ==
=== Critical response ===
"Mío" is one of Rubio's most famous singles and had a predominantly positive critical reception. Contemporary journalists assert that the song "reflected the anxiety of owning everything." The Chilean academic Ricardo Martínez wrote for ADN Radio Chile that "Mío" is "one of those unobjectionable karaoke songs, well flamboyant".

As the first single from La Chica Dorada, it received many comparisons to the same dance-pop beat of the American singer Madonna. Following its debut on the Billboard Latin charts, critics called "Mío" a "dancefloor thumper" song.

=== Commercial performance ===
With "Mío", Rubio became first ex vocalist Timbiriche to entered hits on the Billboard US Hot Latin Songs chart, where it debuted at number 19 on the issue dated November 28, 1992. The song reached number three on the chart the week of February 13, 1993 and remained there for three weeks and was on the chart for 17 weeks.

Upon its release in Latin America, the single quickly climbed up the top ten charts, simultaneously peaking at number one in El Salvador, Panama and Peru. In Mexico, it was a success, became Rubio's first number-one hit and was certified gold.

== Music video ==
The music video for "Mío" was filmed in a recording studio in Mexico City and was directed by writer and director Ángel Flores, and produced by Ariel Montes, who worked with the singer for the first time. The video features Paulina Rubio's first look as "la chica doarada", wearing different outfits, mainly in gold, as well as elements alluding to gold, teased blonde hair and eyebrows marked. Music video's aesthetics is generally a kitsch ode to contrast singer's melodramatic interpretation.

It begins with Paulina Rubio posing for the cameraman, who is her love interest; the role of the subject is played by former model José Cabalán Macari. It continues with close-up shots of the singer dancing in different scenarios. In the first one, she steps out of a curtain that has a huge red heart print, wearing a gold jumpsuit. In the next one, videos of purple flowers and iconic locations of Mexico City such as the Angel of Independence are projected on a curtain. Other elements used in the music video are a blue sky background with white clouds and golden angel wings, a cardboard cherub suspended by threads, a red heart with white wings also suspended, and a huge pop art style vignette. In one of the scenes the shadows of Paulina Rubio and her love interest are shown in front of a background of purple and violet flowers.

The video premiered in the Mexico in September 1993. It was also nominated for Favorite Video at the ERES Awards in January 1993.

== Covers, samples, and media usage ==
"Mío" has been covered on numerous occasions. One of the earliest covers of the song was by the Puerto Rican merengue singer Jailene, recorded in 1994, and was later included in the release of their debut studio album. Mexican singer Paty Cantú used a fragment of the song in her homonymous song from her album Corazón Bipolar in 2012. It included the epic chorus with Rubio's voice ("Mío, ese hombre es mío... A medias pero mío, mío, mío") on the bridge of it. Cantú assured that "loved the idea and I ended up putting it in, played [the song] for me when I was very little and I loved it." She also used the samples "Mío" to perform it at her concerts during her musical tour in 2013 and made a mashup. Litzy, OV7 and Erik Rubín himself also performed a "Mío" mashup with the songs "Hey Güera" (Alejandra Guzman) and "Es Por Amor" (Litzy) on the first stage of the iconic 90's Pop Tour concert tour.

The song has been used in countless television programs in Latin America and is part of Hispanic pop culture due to the great media impact it had at the time. The Mexican Netflix production La Casa de las Flores made a cameo by Rubio throughout its broadcast with a drag queen performing her personality and songs, including "Mío", which appeared in the first season. Also featured in the 2020 LGBT film The Strong Ones, directed by Chilean cineast Omar Zúñiga Hidalgo.

== Impact and legacy ==
After its release, "Mío" achieved unprecedented commercial success, many critics and journalists pointed out that part of that impact was thanks to the scandal between Rubio, Guzmán and Rubín and praised it as an "advertising strategy." Mexican journalist Cucho Gallegos assured that the love triangle between Alejandra Guzmán, Erick Rubín and Paulina Rubio was "a very rich and historical musical dispute within pop music." However, the legacy of the song that launched Rubio to stardom went beyond gossip. According to VH1, "Mío" is considered one of the songs of the 90's that marked the music industry in Latin America.

"Mío" has also gained wide acceptance in the LGBT community by becoming an anthem and Terra listed the song among the "35 gay songs in music history." Mexican writer Miguel Capistán and U.S. scholar Michael K. Schuessler, in their book México se escribe con J: Una historia de la cultura gay, noted that "Mío" has "a spontaneous male chorus" that "awakens a non-heterosexual desire" in the gay audience, even if it is a song aimed at a heterosexual relationship.

== Track listing and formats ==
These are the formats and track listings of major single releases of "Mío".

- Mexico Vinyl, 7", Single, Promo
1. "Mío" – 3:33
2. "Mío (Instrumental)" – 3:33
- Mexico 7" Single, 45 RPM Single
1. "Mío" – 3:33
2. "Sabor A Miel" – 3:53
- Mexico 12" single, 33 ⅓ RPM, Promo
1. "Mío (Extended Pop Mix)" – 5:22
2. "Mío (Underground Mix)" – 5:22
3. "Mío (Radio Edit)" – 4:22
- Mexico CD, Single, Vinyl, 12", 33 ⅓ RPM, Maxi-Single
1. "Mío (Extended Pop Mix)" – 5:22
2. "Mío (Underground Mix)" – 5:22
3. "Mío (Radio Edit)" – 4:22
4. "Amor De Mujer (Remix)" – 7:53

- Ecuador Vinyl, 12", 33 ⅓ RPM, Maxi-Single
1. "Mío (Extended Pop Mix)" – 5:22
2. "Mío (Underground Mix)" – 5:22
3. "Mío (Radio Edit)" – 4:22
4. "Amor De Mujer (Remix)" – 7:53
5. "Sabor A Miel" – 3:53

== Live performances ==
Rubio performed the song on the following concert tours:

- Mío Tour
- La Chica Dorada Tour
- 24 Kilates Tour
- El Tiempo Es Oro Tour
- Planeta Paulina Tour
- Paulina World Tour
- Border Girl Tour
- Pau-Latina Tour
- Amor, Luz y Sonido Tour
- Gran City Pop Tour
- Brava! World Tour
- Deseo Tour

The song was also performed on:

- Paulina Rubio & Friends a 2011 TV special

== Credits and personnel ==
- Paulina Rubio - lead vocals
- José Ramón Flórez - Composer, Songwriter
- César Valle - Songwriter
- Miguel Blasco - engineering, Music director, Executive producer
- Luis Méndez - Art Direction

== Charts and certifications ==
=== Weekly charts ===
Chart (1992–1993)	Peak position
US Hot Latin Songs (Billboard)	3

=== Year-end charts ===
Chart (1993)	Peak position
US Hot Latin Songs (Billboard)	12

=== Certifications ===
Region	Certification	Certified units/sales
Mexico (AMPROFON)	Gold	30,000^{*}
^{*} Sales figures based on certification alone.
