= Enamorada (I'm So In Love) =

Single by Paulina Rubio

from the album Planeta Paulina
- Released: January 4, 1997
- Recorded: 1996
- Genre: Dance pop
- Length: 3:27
- Label: EMI Music
- Songwriters: Paulina Rubio; Cesar Valle
- Producer: Paulina Rubio: Marco Flores

Paulina Rubio singles chronology
"Solo Por Ti" (1996)	"Enamorada" (1997)	"Lo Haré Por Ti" (2000)

Audio video
- "Enamorada" on YouTube

"Enamorada" (In Love) is a song by the Mexican recording artist Paulina Rubio from her fourth studio album, Planeta Paulina (1996). The song was released on January 4, 1997, as the final single from the album, and her final one for the EMI Music label. "Enamorada" was written by Rubio with Cesar Valle and produced by Rubio and Marco Flores. Backed by synthesisers and keyboards, it is a dance-pop track. The lyrics revolve around a love deception, involving a homosexual man.

"Enamorada" received mostly positive reviews from music critics, some of whom highlighted the track as an album stand-out and commended the lyrical and vocal delivery. The song has ended up becoming an anthem for the LGBT community; Uruguayan writer Charli Farinha Toni alluded to "Enamorada" as a "gay anthem" in her novel Desafíos en los Caminos. According to El Siglo de Torreón, the song is one of the 10 hits that has defined Rubio's musical career.

In January 2002 an English version was released for US rhythmic radio only, titled "I'm So In Love" to promote the compilation album I'm So in Love: Grandes Éxitos (2002).

== Music video ==
A music video for "Enamorada" was directed by Fernando de Garay, which showed a homosexual couple and the rainbow flag openly on television. A theme that was still considered a taboo at that time. Over time, critics and journalists praised Rubio as one of the first Latin artists to open up to the LGBT community. The staff of the Spanish women's magazine MujerdeElite wrote "[Rubio] was one of the first singers in the 1990s to incorporate gay images in her music videos" referring to the music video for "Enamorada", where she shows a homosexual couple. The publication quoted, "Since then, she has been the diva of choice for her upbeat, infectious music, full of eroticism and sexuality."

== Track listing ==
Mexican CD single

1. "Enamorada" (Album Version)
2. "I'm So In Love (Enamorada)" (English Version)
3. "I'm So In Love" (Mijangos Classic Mix)
4. "I'm So In Love" (Mijangos Classic Edit)
