= Siempre Tuya Desde La Raíz =

Single by Paulina Rubio

from the album Planeta Paulina
- Released: July 11, 1996
- Recorded: 1996
- Studio: South Beach Studios (Miami, Florida)
- Genre: Dance-pop
- Length: 4:49
- Label: EMI Latin
- Songwriters: Karla Aponte; Cesar Lemos; Rodolfo Castillo
- Producer: Marco Flores

Paulina Rubio singles chronology
"Pobre Niña Rica" (1995)	"Siempre Tuya Desde La Raíz" (1996)	"Solo Por Ti" (1996)

Music video
- "Siempre Tuya Desde La Raíz" on YouTube

"Siempre Tuya Desde La Raíz" (English: Open Up Your Heart) is a song recorded by Mexican singer Paulina Rubio, taken from her fourth studio album Planeta Paulina (1996). It was released as the album's lead single in July 1996, by EMI Latin. The track was written by Karla Aponte and the music by Cesar Lemos and Rodolfo Castillo, whilst production was handled by Marco Flores. It was recorded in Miami, Florida at South Beach Studios during spring 1996. Musically, it is a dance-pop song that incorporates elements of techno, house, disco, and electronic keyboard instrumentation, whilst the lyrical content talks about Rubio's seduction with sexual metaphors.

Upon its release, "Siempre Tuya Desde La Raíz" received critical acclaim from music critics. Several critics selected the track as a standout from many of her records and compilation, whilst individual reviews commended the production and influence of dance and house elements. An accompanying music video was directed by Fernando de Garay with a concept cosmic "and 70's dance." It was choreographed by Miguel Sahagún.

In 2016, the website UniversoGay includes the song among the "15 best songs to enjoy submission, in Spanish", highlighting the sexual lyrics metaphors.

== Track listing and formats ==
- Mexico CD, Single, Promo, Cardboard Sleeve
1. "Siempre Tuya Desde La Raíz"
- Mexico CD, Remixes, Maxi-Single
1. "Siempre Tuya Desde La Raíz" (V. Album) – 4:39
2. "Siempre Tuya Desde La Raíz" (Planeta Club Mix) – 6:48
3. "Siempre Tuya Desde La Raíz" (Planeta Radio Mix) – 4:11
4. "Siempre Tuya Desde La Raíz" (Planeta Dub Mix) – 6:48
5. "Siempre Tuya Desde La Raíz" (House Club Mix) – 6:44
6. "Siempre Tuya Desde La Raíz" (House Radio Mix) – 4:10
7. "Siempre Tuya Desde La Raíz" (House Dub Mix) – 6:44
8. "Siempre Tuya Desde La Raíz" (Spanglish Planet Mix) – 6:47
9. "Siempre Tuya Desde La Raíz" (Ingles Planet Mix) – 4:16
10. "Siempre Tuya Desde La Raíz" (Spanglish Club Mix) – 6:42
11. "Siempre Tuya Desde La Raíz" (Ingles Club Edit) – 4:08
- USA CD, Single, Promo
1. "Siempre Tuya Desde La Raíz" (original Version) – 4:39
2. "Siempre Tuya Desde La Raíz" (Mijangos Club Mix) – 6:44
3. "Siempre Tuya Desde La Raíz" (Mijangos Radio Edit) – 4:10
4. "Siempre Tuya Desde La Raíz" (Mijangos Planet Mix) – 6:48
5. "Siempre Tuya Desde La Raíz" (Mijangos Planet Edit) – 4:11

== Charts ==
Chart (1996)	Peak position
Mexico	5
