= Amor de Mujer =

Single by Paulina Rubio

from the album La Chica Dorada
- Released: November 1992 (Mexico); May 29, 1993 (US)
- Recorded: 1992
- Studio: Estudios Balu-Balu (Madrid, Spain)
- Genre: Pop rock; new wave
- Length: 3:54
- Label: EMI Latin
- Songwriters: Gian Pietro Felisatti; José Ramón Flórez; César Valle
- Producer: J.R. Flórez

Paulina Rubio singles chronology
"Abriendo las Puertas al Amor" (1993)	"Amor de Mujer" (1992)	"Sabor a Miel" (1993)

Music video
- "Amor De Mujer" on YouTube

"Amor de Mujer" (English: "Woman's Love") is a song recorded by Mexican singer Paulina Rubio for her debut solo studio album La Chica Dorada (1992). Released as the album's second single in January 1993 in Mexico, and as the third single on May 29, 1993, in the United States, the song has subsequently appeared on most of Rubio's compilation albums, including Top Hits (2000) and Mio: Paulina Y Sus Éxitos (2006). Like most of Rubio's early material, it was written by Gian Pietro Felisatti, José Ramón Flórez and César Valle.

"Amor de Mujer" entered the Billboard Hot Latin Songs chart, peaking at number eight, and was Rubio's second number-one hit in Mexico. The accompanying music video for "Amor de Mujer" was directed by Ángel Flores and filmed in sepia tone and color image. The music video was released in January 1993.

== Chart performance ==
"Amor de Mujer" was released in May 1993 in the United States, became Rubio's third hit single, and remained on the charts throughout the summer. It entered the Billboard Hot Latin Songs chart at number 35 on the issue dated June 12, 1993. It ultimately reached a peak of number eight on July 17, 1993, and was on the charts for 17 weeks.

The song peaked at number one in El Salvador. In Mexico City, the song peaked at number two. The success of "Amor de Mujer" helped Rubio's debut studio album to obtain a 3× Gold certification in Mexico and consolidate Rubio's image in the rest of Latin America and the US.

== Music video ==
The accompanying music video for "Amor de Mujer" was directed by Ángel Flores, and was filmed in the fall of 1992. It begins with takes of Rubio lying on her bed. In a close-up, Rubio sings the song as if she were telling the story of her first love with a bad boy, played by José Cabalán Macari, while wearing smooth hair shines and an iconic Chanel necklace. Immediately, the video changes to sepia tone with Rubio playing the song and wearing a top, shorts and a leather jacket while the wind moves her blonde hair as she tries to put on a leather beret.

== Track listing and formats ==
Mexican CD and cassette single

1. "Amor de Mujer" – 3:54

== Credits and personnel ==
- Paulina Rubio – lead vocals
- Gian Pietro Felisatti – composer, writer
- José Ramón Flórez – composer, writer
- Miguel Blasco – music director, producer
- Remy Causse – arranger
- José Antonio Álvarez Alija – engineer

== Charts ==
=== Weekly charts ===
Chart (1992–1993)	Peak position
US Hot Latin Songs (Billboard)	8
