= Él Me Engañó =

Single by Paulina Rubio

from the album 24 Kilates
- Released: February 3, 1994
- Recorded: Estudios Balu-Balu (Madrid, Spain)
- Genre: Pop rock
- Length: 4:09
- Label: EMI Capitol
- Songwriters: C. Valle; Don Matamoros
- Producer: Miguel Blasco

Paulina Rubio singles chronology
"Nieva, Nieva" (1993)	"Él Me Engañó" (1994)	"Vuelve Junto A Mi" (1994)

Music video
- "Él Me Engañó" on YouTube

"Él Me Engañó" (English: "He Cheated On Me") is a song performed by Mexican singer Paulina Rubio, recorded for her second studio album 24 Kilates (1993). The song was written by César Valle and Don Matamoros, and was released on February 3, 1994 as the second single off the album by EMI Latin. The song has been sporadically mentioned by the media as one of the singer's most acclaimed female anthems.

Musically, "Él Me Engañó" is like Rubio's previous single, which is pop-rock related, with instruments including guitars, drum machine and tambourine effects. The song peaked at number four on the Mexico City and number five on the San Salvador chart published by El Siglo de Torreón.

== Music video ==
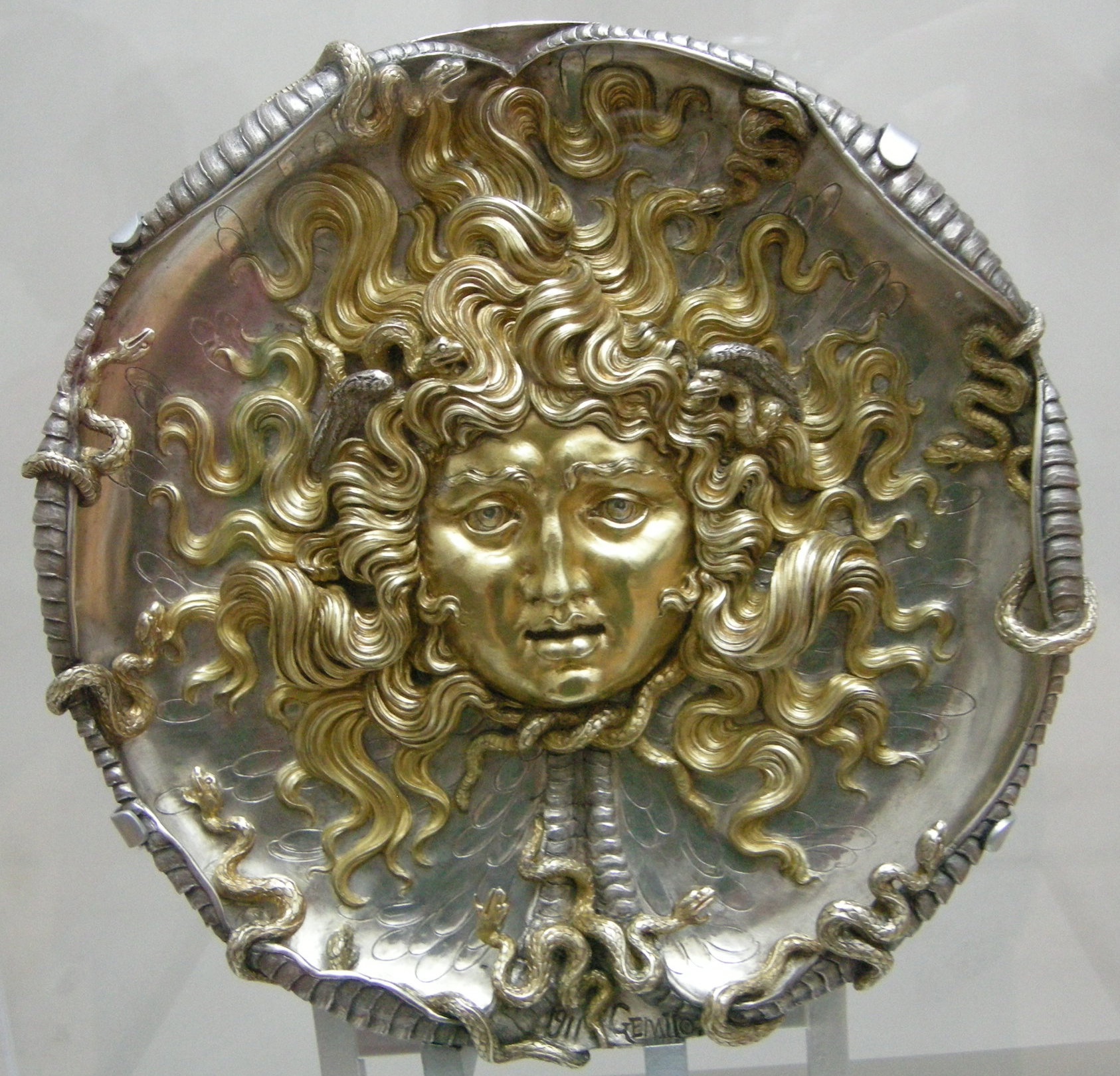
Rubio looks like a Golden Medusa in the video.

"Él Me Engañó" featured a sepia tone music video that was directed by Daniel Gruener and filmed at Rubio's hometown in Mexico in January 1994. The video features Rubio in a church in her wedding day. The filming locations were in the Church of San Pedro Apostol in Tláhuac, Mexico City and the forum of the América Studios.

In the video, she appears wearing a wedding dress with a big heart on her back as neckline, Rubio wait outside the church to her boyfriend, who never arrives and disconsolate, runs around looking for him. In alternative scenes, there appears an alter ego of Rubio similar to Medusa in gold body paint interprets the song, this symbolizes the power and feminine wisdom that she acquires, after the break with her boyfriend. It also represents their spiritual light, as in Egyptian culture.

The video cost was 25,000 dollars and according to the director, it is a mixture of game images of the old and the modern. A concept that Rubio had already used in his first videos, especially in "Nieva, Nieva".

In 2011, Rubio reminds the body paint era in the music video "Me Gustas Tanto". A similar concept adopted for the music video "Suave y Sutil" in 2018, belonging to her eleventh studio album "Deseo".

== Credits and personnel ==
- Paulina Rubio – lead vocals
- C. Valle – Composer, songwriter, Producer
- Don Matamoros – Composer, songwriter
- Miguel Blasco – Music director, executive producer
- Walter Tesorierie – Arrangement

== Charts ==
Chart (1994)	Peak position
Mexico Top Airplay (Notitas Musicales)	5
