= Planeta Paulina =

Studio album by Paulina Rubio
- Released: September 3, 1996
- Recorded: 1995–1996
- Studio: Various: 3rd Floor; After Hours Studios; Castle Recording Studio; Moonlight Music Studios; South Beach Studios; Studio Center
- Genres: Pop; dance; house; electronic
- Length: 42:04
- Labels: EMI Mexico, Virgin
- Producers: Marco Flores; Paulina Rubio

Paulina Rubio chronology
MaxiSingle (1995)	Planeta Paulina (1996)	Paulina (2000)

Singles from Planeta Paulina
- 1. "Siempre Tuya Desde La Raíz" Released: July 17, 1996; 2. "Solo Por Ti" Released: September 24, 1996; 3. "Miedo" Released: November 28, 1996; 4. "Enamorada" Released: January 7, 1997

Planeta Paulina (Planet Paulina) is the fourth studio album by Mexican singer Paulina Rubio. It was first released by EMI Mexico on 22 August 1996 in Mexico and 3 September in United States, and distributed in 22 countries around the world months later. The singer asserted partial creative control over the project, taking the role of co-producer and composer of the material assisted by various musicians and producers, namely K.C. Porter, Rodolfo Castillo, Cesar Lemos, Cesar Valle, Per Magnusson and David Kreuger.

Influenced by the dance-pop music, sonically Planeta Paulina is a departure from Rubio's previous work. The record encompasses a variety of styles from the dance genre, including techno, electronica, house and disco. Lyrically, the album's focus is on Rubio's self-discovery as composer, and delves into social issues such as AIDS, the economic crisis, relationships and emotions. Upon its release, critical and public reception of Planeta Paulina was positive, but commercially, the album did not meet expected expectations.

Four singles were released from the album: "Siempre Tuya Desde La Raíz", "Solo Por Ti", "Miedo" (in North America only), and "Enamorada", all of which experienced moderate success.

== Background and development ==
After the great commercial success of her first two hit albums and an attempt to enter the international market with El Tiempo Es Oro, Rubio returned to acting at the end of 1995 in her film debut Bésame En La Boca and recorded her third Mexican soap opera, Pobre Niña Rica, consolidating her status in the acting world. In May 1996, Emilio Estefan and José Behar, then president of EMI Latin, announced that the most important Spanish-speaking artists would gather to sing around the Atlanta Olympics. Among them, Rubio would resume her musical career with the song "Será Entre Tú Y Yo", part of the album Voces Unidas written and directed by Estefan. That same month, Rubio took the opportunity to talk about the creative process of her fourth studio album and, in turn, unveiled its name, Planeta Paulina. She said: "I want to show that I am not only a pretty face, but I have intelligence, I have prepared myself and now I am studying Art History."

On 6 July 1996, Billboard magazine reported that EMI would release the singer's fourth studio album in the coming months, following a contract in which the label would be responsible for regaining her status in Latin America after two "hit albums" and another moderate success. The album would be the first of a contract that provided for the release of three albums with EMI over the course of four years. The album marks Paulina's control in the creative process and was produced by Marco Flores. The first single released was written by Rodolfo Castillo and a single with English versions and remixes of the song "Solo por ti" was planned before the launch of Planeta Paulina.

== Composition ==
"(Planeta Paulina) is an album thought with the heart and reason. The truth, it was done with great enthusiasm and professionalism. I worked as an album producer for 18 months and in the fifth month I found the futuristic concept I was looking for the album. Then came the analysis of the letters that had to be consistent."

— Rubio, about the process and concept of Planeta Paulina

Musically, Planeta Paulina is a departure from Rubio's previous output, being influenced by the techno and Europop dance revolution of the mid-to-late 1990s. Conceived as an avant-garde pop record, the material encompasses a variety of versatile styles from the dance genre, including techno, electronica, disco, drum and bass and house. This album represent the transition of Rubio as a "dance diva" complete with a slick collection of electro-tinged club thumpers produced by the singer and Marco Flores. Additionally, selected recordings experiment with futuristic and spatial sound effects. Lyrically, the album's central focus is Rubio's passion, love, relationships and emotions. But when venturing as a songwriter, she touches on important social issues in that decade such as global warming, HIV, sexual orientation and the Mexican peso crisis.

== Singles ==
- Siempre tuya desde la Raíz: First single of the album, an album of remixes of the song was released, it includes the song in its album version and more 10 remixes, they are: Album Version (04:44); Planet Club Mix (06:48); Planet ·Radio Mix (04:11); Planet ·Dub Mix (06:48); House Club Mix (06:44); House ·Radio Mix (04:10); House ·Dub Mix (06:44); Spanglish Planet Mix (06:47); English Planet Mix (04:16); Spanglish Club Mix (06:42); English ·Club Edit (04:08). A music video of the song was directed by the Mexican director Fernando de Garay in a studio of the United States, most part of the video was made behind a green screen and it shows cybernetic and universal images.
- Solo Por Ti: The second single of the album, released in August 1996. A CD single was released and includes the tracks: Version Album (4:14); Mix (7:47); 70's Edit (4:02); Dance Extended Mix (6:39); Mix Edit (3:55); English Version (4:14). A music video directed by Fernando de Garay was released, and also included in the "Planeta Paulina" Televisa special.
- Enamorada: Third single of the album. A maxi single of the song was released in Mexico. It includes the track versions: Album Version (3:37); I'm So In Love (Enamorada english version) (3:24); I'm So In Love - Mijangos Classic Mix (7:06); I'm So In Love - Mijangos Classic Edit (4:13). A music video was made, it was filmed in Mexico and New York City, and was directed by Fernando de Garay. The video has a gay theme, in it Paulina discovers that her boyfriend cheats with another man.

== Critical reception ==
Professional ratings
Review scores
Source	Rating
Allmusic	2/5 stars

While the website Allmusic rated Planeta Paulina with two out of five stars, the Mexican press praised the album as "a sensational album, full of feelings and enthusiasm," although with "a more acute voice (from Paulina)." Likewise, the publication highlighted "Solo Por Ti", "Enamorada", "Siempre Tuya desde La Raíz" and "Una Historia Más" as the best songs on the album.

Music critic Joey Guerra from Amazon highlighted the songs "Miel Y Sal", "Miedo" and "Siempre Tuya desde La Raíz" and he said they are "irresistible for the dance floor". He also mentioned that Rubio "fills the album" with in-depth moments with "Enamorada" and "Una Historia Más". In General he said that 'Planeta Paulina' has "contagious energy that listeners should send to heaven."

== Track listing ==
No.	Title	Writer(s)	Producer(s)	Length
1.	"Introducción"	Paulina Rubio; Cesar Valle	Paulina Rubio; Marco Flores	0:49
2.	"Miel Y Sal"	Karla Aponte; Cesar Lemos; Marcello Azevedo	Flores	4:11
3.	"Tú Y Yo"	Marco Flores; K.C. Porter	Flores; K.C. Porter	4:05
4.	"Solo Por Ti"	Flores	Flores	4:14
5.	"Enamorada"	Rubio; Valle	Rubio; Flores	3:27
6.	"Miedo"	Rubio; Flores	Flores	3:20
7.	"Siempre Tuya Desde La Raíz"	Karla Aponte; Cesar Lemos; Rodolfo Castillo	Rubio; Flores	4:39
8.	"Sueño De Cristal"	Flores	Flores	3:46
9.	"Una Historia Más"	Rubio; Flores	Rubio; Flores	3:44
10.	"Dime"	Thomas Grant; Rubio	Thomas Grant	3:52
11.	"Despiértate"	Erlandsson, Lenander, Morel; Per Magnusson; David Kreuger; Rubio	Rubio; Flores	3:10
Total length:				39:49

Planeta Paulina (bonus track)
No.	Title	Writer(s)	Producer(s)	Length
12.	"Pobre Niña Rica"	Graciela Carballo; Mario Pupparo	Flores	3:36
Total length:				42:04

== Personnel ==
- Paulina Rubio – lead vocals, producer, concept, background vocals
- Marco Flores – producer, arranger, director, sequencing, producer
- César Sogre – engineer, mixing
- Vladimir Meller – mastering
- Rodolfo Castillo – arranger, sequencing
- Ralf Stemman – arranger, sequencing
- Wendy Pedersen – mixing
- Marcelo Azevedo – arranger, sequencing
- Brian Duncan – arranger, sequencing
- César Lemos – arranger, sequencing
- Luis Montes – arranger, sequencing
- Bilta Quintero – mixing
- Diego Robledo – photography

== Release history ==
Country	Release format	Label
Mexico, Brazil	CD; Cassette; Reissue	EMI Music
United States	CD (bonus track)	EMI Music
Spain	CD; Reissue	Virgin
