= Sabor a Miel =

Single by Paulina Rubio

from the album La Chica Dorada
- Released: August 12, 1993
- Studio: Balu-Balu (Madrid, Spain)
- Genre: Pop
- Length: 3:34
- Label: EMI Latin; Capitol
- Songwriters: José Ramón Flórez; César Valle
- Producer: Miguel Blasco

Paulina Rubio singles chronology
"Amor De Mujer" (1993)	"Sabor a Miel" (1993)	"Nieva, Nieva" (1993)

Audio video
- "Sabor A Miel" on YouTube

"Sabor a Miel" (English: "Taste of Honey") is a song recorded by Mexican singer Paulina Rubio for her debut studio album, La Chica Dorada (1992). It was released as a single by Capitol Latin in August 1993 in the US and Latin America. The song was written by José Ramón Flórez and Cesar Valle and produced by Miguel Blasco.

"Sabor a Miel" is a pop ballad tune that details the sadness and melancholy of a narrator who has lost her lover. The song reached number five in Panama. In the United States, it reached number twenty-two on the Billboard Hot Latin Tracks.

A promotional, unofficial music video, inspired by the Middle Ages, was released in early 1993 only during a Mexican television show special, along with the new jack swing non-single "Sangre Latina" from the same album. Paulina performs "Sabor A Miel" along with other ballads as part of medleys during her concert shows.

== Music video ==
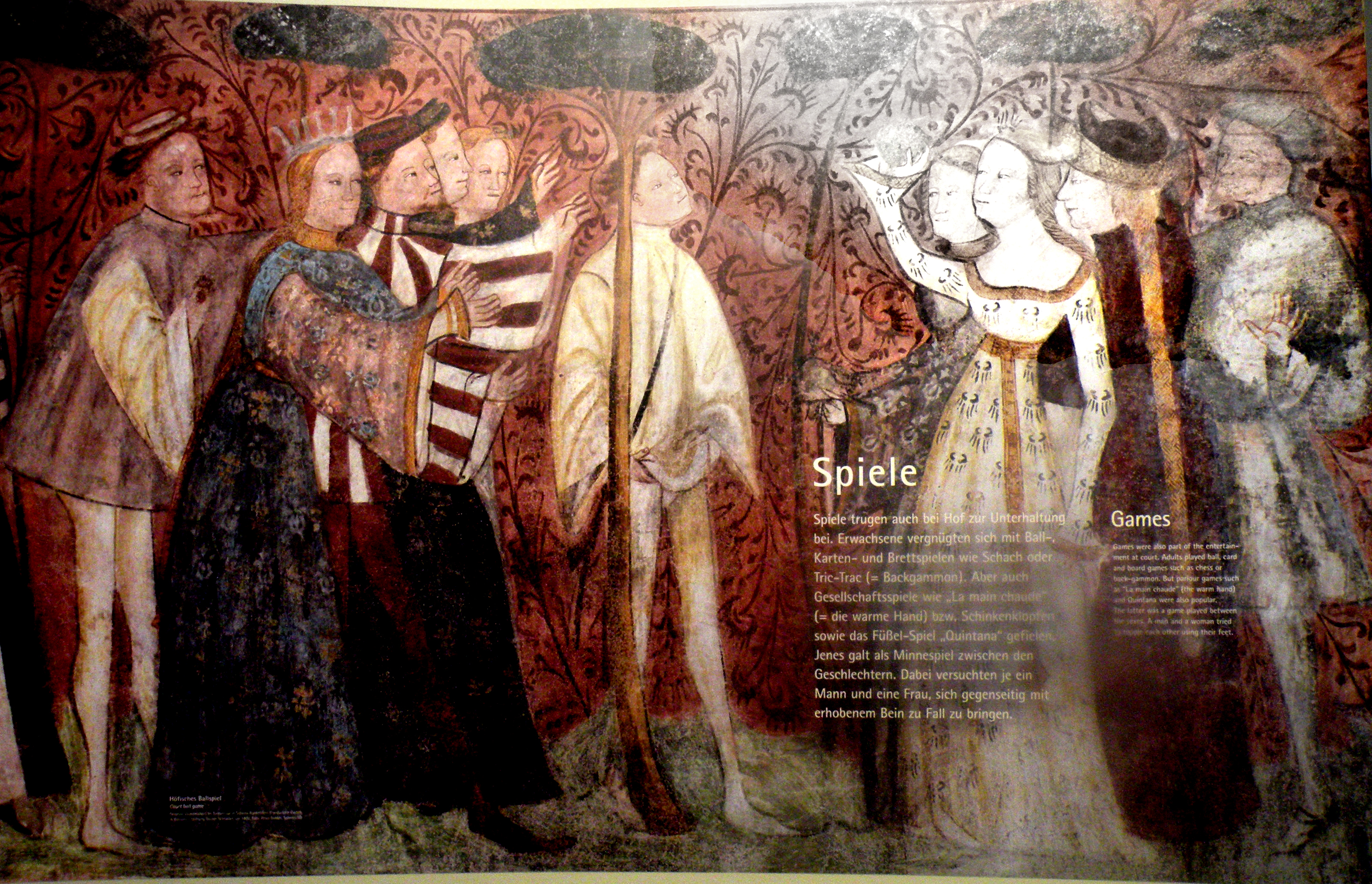
A promotional video was inspired by the Middle Ages.

A promotional video was released during a Mexican television show special in 1993 to promote La Chica Dorada alongside a promotional video for another song off the album, "Sangre Latina". The video's style portrays a Middle Ages look, where Paulina lays in a bed in a long, formal-looking ball gown.

According to Paulina, the song was inspired by a relationship with a boyfriend who died before beginning her solo career. In the song, she reflects poetically over the depression and sadness she experienced during that period.

== Live performances ==
Rubio performed the song on multiple television programs in different Latin American countries. It was one of the most performed songs from La Chica Dorada. One of the most memorable performances was when she performed on the Mexican TV show Siempre en Domingo, where she sang along with her three backup singers and her musicians.

== Formats and track listings ==
Mexican CD single

1. "Sabor A Miel" – 3:34

== Credits and personnel ==
- Paulina Rubio - lead vocals
- José Ramón Flórez - Composer, Songwriter
- César Valle - Songwriter
- Miguel Blasco - engineering, Music director, Executive producer
- Luis Méndez - Art Direction

== Chart performance ==
Chart (1993)	Maxim position
US Hot Latin Songs (Billboard)	22
