= Solo Por Ti =

Single by Paulina Rubio

from the album Planeta Paulina
- Released: September 24, 1996
- Recorded: 1995
- Genre: Dance-pop, deep house
- Length: 4:14
- Label: EMI
- Songwriter: Marco Flores
- Producer: Marco Flores

Paulina Rubio singles chronology
"Siempre Tuya Desde La Raíz" (1996)	"Solo Por Ti" (1996)	"Miedo" (1996)

Music video
- "Solo Por Ti" on YouTube

"Solo Por Ti" (Just for You) is a song written by Marco Flores for Paulina Rubio's fourth album Planeta Paulina released in 1996. It was produced by Marco Flores and released as the album's single in Mexico. The song peaked at #6 in the El Siglo de Torreón's Ballads Charts, the chart covers radios from Mexico City only.

An English language version was released in late 1996, entitled "Only For You", and was released for the English dance market.

== Music video ==
A music video for "Solo Por Ti" was directed by Fernando de Garay and filmed in a desert in Mexico. The filming took place at the same time the singer shot the TV special for the album Planeta Paulina, in the summer of 1996.

== Formats and track listings ==
Mexico CD single:

1. Version Album 4:14
2. Mix 7:47
3. 70's Edit 4:02
4. Dance Extended Mix 6:39
5. Mix Edit 3:55
6. Only For You (English Version) 4:14
