= José Ramón Flórez =

Spanish songwriter

José Ramón "J.R." Flórez (born 26 March 1951) is a Spanish songwriter and record producer.

He wrote songs for many popular singers in Mexico during the 1980s. His work included compositions and mixing & mastering for Yuri, Lucero, Alejandra Guzmán, Mijares, Pandora, Paulina Rubio, Daddy Yankee, Mark Battles, Michael Jackson, Prince Royce, Sergio Dalma, Rocío Banquells, among others. José Ramón is a 2012-13 Grammy nominated audio engineer.

During the 1990s he also was a very important songwriter, with work on albums by Fey, Sentidos Opuestos, Jeans and OV7.

Flórez, in the 2000s, also has produced albums for other artists like: Hugo, Sergio Rivero and Andy & Lucas.

His biggest success came with the three albums he wrote and produced for Mexican singer Fey in the '90s, having had 16 radio hits in Mexico in a period of four years. Her albums became internationally renowned and lead to Billboard Music Award, Grammy wins and multi-platinum sales.
