= Miguel Blasco =

Spanish music producer and songwriter

Miguel Blasco is a music producer and songwriter. Born in Spain.

When he was 16 years old, he joined his first rock band and moved to Ibiza in 1963 through the first years of the musical movement called "beatnic", before the "hippies". On stage, he joined Brian Jones from the Rolling Stones, Willy Brook (drum player for Jimmy Smith), Emilio Sangaro, Ian Anderson, among others, in the only night club in the island.

Later he appeared on a "Marcofestival" in Barcelona and began to write musical scores for Catalan films. He also joined Jimi Hendrix on "Club Babalu" in 1966 and discovered singer-songwriter Joan Manuel Serrat.

He was forced to join the army in 1969, staying off the stages for 18 months. When he returned from military duty, he preferred to work on an independent label as a talent scout, moving to London to pursue this. When he returned to Madrid, he became the disc jockey at the "Club Hotel Barajas" with success.

Years later he joined Ramon Segura on a new label called Ariola as Marketing Director and had the opportunity to work on the first three albums by Camilo Sesto. His musical experience helped him to win the "Best Marketing Director in Spain" for three years in a row.

Due to his success, other record labels wanted him on the staff; offers from CBS, RCA, Movieplay and Hispavox came along. He decided to join the weakest one: Hispavox, and turned that label into a very successful one, recording albums from José Luis Perales, Paloma San Basilio, Raphael and Bebu Silvetti as piano player. All these albums hit the No. 1 spot in Spain, along with another international artists like Eagles and Foreigner. In only a year, Hispavox became the number one label in Spain. Blasco worked there for nine years.

Hispavox lost the distribution by Warner Bros. Records and Miguel worked to fill that void, using the advantage that his label had the best recording studio in the country.

Singers like Raphael, Alberto Cortez, Paloma San Basilio, Mecano, Alaska, Nacha Pop, Radio Futura, among others, were developed on Hispavox by Blasco.

Blasco later worked with Rafaela Carrá on three albums. In 1984, he decided to retire for a few years, but before this he travelled to Mexico with the Spanish team to compete in "Festival OTI". EMI International purchased Hispavox and offered a contact to Blasco to be producer and artistic manager.

From 1984 to 1994, EMI International was a very strong label with the launching of very strong sellers like Daniela Romo, Yurí, Fandango, Pandora, Tatiana, Mijares, Sentidos Opuestos, Angela Carrasco, Lucía Méndez and Nelson Ned.

Paulina Rubio wanted to work with Blasco since she was a little girl, and when she got signed by EMI, he produced her first three albums, selling almost 2 million copies.

While he was working on EMI, he developed another artist for Warner Bros. Records: Rocío Banquells who sold 1.5 million copies.

He also developed Melody for Televisa in Mexico with performers like Alejandra Guzmán and Lucero, selling seven million copies.

Blasco developed many new talents, including Omar Alfano and Rudy Pérez. He later became the President for the label "Lideres", from 2001 to 2002.
