= Joss Favela =

Mexican singer-songwriter

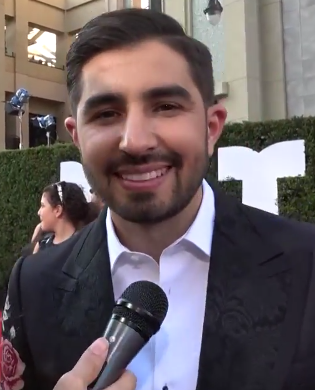
- Favela at the Latin American Music Awards of 2018

Background information
- Born: José Alberto Inzunza Favela; December 10, 1990 (age 35); Guamúchil, Sinaloa, Mexico
- Origin: Guamúchil, Sinaloa
- Genre: Regional Mexican
- Occupations: Singer; songwriter; Record producer
- Instruments: Vocals; guitar; bass
- Years active: 2004–present
- Label: Sony Music Mexico
- Website: www.jossfavelaoficial.com

José Alberto Inzunza Favela (born December 10, 1990), most commonly known as Joss Favela, is a Mexican musician, singer and songwriter. Considered "el lujo de Sinaloa" (the luxury of Sinaloa), Favela has collaborated with regional Mexican artists, including Alejandro Fernández, Christian Nodal, Banda El Recodo and La Arrolladora Banda El Limón, writing songs for them as well as for himself.

He has released four studio albums including the Grammy-nominated albums Hecho a Mano (2016) and Caminando (2019). He has won the ASCAP Latin Songwriter of the Year Award three consecutive times (2016–2018) and has been nominated for two Grammy Awards, four Latin Grammy Awards and nine Premios Lo Nuestro.

== Career ==
=== 2004–2015: Early beginnings ===
Favela began writing songs at age 12. In 2004, he participated in the second season of Código F.A.M.A., a children's singing reality television show, aired on Televisa, where he finished at seventh place. At age 14, he began writing songs for other artists and released the albums La Reynalda and Andar Conmigo, under the name Joss Favela. He also collaborated with Mexican group 3Ball MTY in the song "Baile de Amor", included in the group's debut album Inténtalo (2011).

The following years he wrote songs for various Regional Mexican artists such as Julión Álvarez, Larry Hernández, Noel Torres and Gerardo Ortíz, among others. For his work as a songwriter in "Me Sobrabas Tú", performed by Banda Los Recoditos, he and Luciano Luna were nominated for Best Regional Song at the 16th Annual Latin Grammy Awards, being his first Latin Grammy Award nomination. In 2016, he received the ASCAP Latin Songwriter of the Year Award, given by the American Society of Composers, Authors and Publishers (ASCAP), becoming the youngest recipient of the award. He went on to receive the award two more times, in 2017 and 2018.

=== 2016–2020: Hecho a Mano and Caminando ===
In 2016, he released the singles "Me Gusta Verte Arrepentida", "Cuando Fuimos Nada", "No Vuelvas a Llamarme" and "Porque No Te Enamoras". The latter peaked at number 32 at the Hot Latin Songs chart, being his first appearance on the chart. Additionally, all singles entered the Regional Mexican Songs chart. On May 6, 2016, he released his first studio album Hecho a Mano. The album peaked at number 13 at the Top Latin Albums chart, being Favela's only appearance in the chart to date. It was also certified gold in Mexico. At the 17th Annual Latin Grammy Awards, he received a nomination for Best New Artist as well as for Best Norteño Album for Hecho a Mano. The following year, at the 59th Annual Grammy Awards, Hecho a Mano was nominated for Best Regional Mexican Music Album (including Tejano), being his first Grammy Award nomination. In 2017, Favela featured as a judge on the sixteenth season of Estrella TV's talent show Tengo Talento, Mucho Talento.

Through 2018, he released the singles "Pienso en Ti", featuring American singer Becky G, "Me Hubieras Dicho" and "La Magia de Tus Ojos". The two latter songs appeared on the Hot Latin Songs chart at numbers 27 and 41, respectively. They also cracked the Top 10 at the Regional Mexican Songs chart, with "Me Hubieras Dicho" peaking at number 2 (his highest appearance in the chart to date), and "La Magia de Tus Ojos" at number 4. The singles were later included in Caminando, his second studio album, released on May 31, 2019. The album was certified gold in both Mexico and the United States. At the 62nd Annual Grammy Awards, it was nominated for Best Regional Mexican Music Album (including Tejano), being his second nomination in the category.

=== 2021–present: Llegando al Rancho, Aclarando la Mente and television appearances ===
His third album Llegando al Rancho was released on May 2, 2021, while the following year, on October 14, he released his fourth album Aclarando la Mente, featuring the singles "Gato de Madrugada", "700 Días", "Algo Transitorio" and "Yo Perdí". Llegando al Rancho was nominated for Best Banda Album at the 22nd Annual Latin Grammy Awards. During 2022, he participated as a judge on the fourth season of Azteca Uno' singing competition La Voz Kids, alongside Mexican singers Paty Cantú and María León, and Venezuelan duo Mau y Ricky. He was also a judge on the eleventh season of La Voz, also aired on Azteca Uno, with Mexican singer Yuridia, American duo Ha*Ash and Spanish singer David Bisbal.

== Discography ==
=== Studio albums ===
List of studio albums, with selected details, chart positions, sales, and certifications
Title	Studio album details	Peak chart positions		Certifications
Title	Studio album details	US Latin	MEX Reg.	Certifications
Hecho a Mano	Released: May 6, 2016; Label: Sony Music Latin; Format: CD, digital download, streaming	13	6	AMPROFON: Gold
Caminando	Released: May 31, 2019; Label: Sony Music Latin; Format: CD, digital download, streaming	—	18	RIAA: Platinum (Latin); AMPROFON: Gold
Llegando al Rancho	Released: May 2, 2021; Label: Sony Music Latin; Format: CD, digital download, streaming	—	—	
Aclarando la Mente	Released: October 14, 2022; Label: Sony Music Latin; Format: CD, digital download, streaming	—	—	

=== Singles ===
List of singles as lead artist, with selected chart positions and certifications, showing year released and album name
Title	Year	Peak chart positions			Certifications	Album
Title	Year	US Latin	MEX Reg.	MEX Air	Certifications	Album
"Baile de Amor" (with 3Ball MTY)	2011	—	—	43		Inténtalo
"Me Gusta Verte Arrepentida"	2016	—	25	—		Hecho a Mano
"Cuando Fuimos Nada"	2016	—	20	41	RIAA: Platinum (Latin); AMPROFON: 3× Platinum	Hecho a Mano
"No Vuelvas a Llamarme"	2016	—	39	41		Hecho a Mano
"Porque No Te Enamoras"	2017	32	3	42		Hecho a Mano
"Pienso en Ti" (with Becky G)	2018	—	—	—		Caminando
"Quiero"	2018	—	19	—		Caminando
"La Magia de Tus Ojos"	2018	41	4	9	AMPROFON: 2× Platinum	Caminando
"Me Hubieras Dicho"	2018	27	2	47	RIAA: Platinum (Latin)	Caminando
"Vas a Llorar" (with Cornelio Vega y su Dinastía)	2020	—	—	—		—N/a
"Te Dije"	2020	—	—	—		Llegando al Rancho
"Ya No Quiero Andar Contigo"	2020	—	7	9		Llegando al Rancho
"Tú y Yo"	2020	—	—	—		Llegando al Rancho
"El Alumno" (featuring Jessi Uribe)	2021	—	6	6		Llegando al Rancho
"Alguien Especial"	2021	—	—	—		Llegando al Rancho
"Tu Adiós Como Tequila"	2021	—	14	18		Llegando al Rancho
"Mi Ego" (with Natalia Jiménez)	2021	—	—	—		México de Mi Corazón, Vol. 2
"Si Todo Se Acabo" (with Andrés Cepeda)	2021	—	—	50		Décimo Cuarto
"Gato de Madrugada"	2022	—	7	14		Aclarando la Mente
"700 Días"	2022	—	—	—		Aclarando la Mente
"Algo Transitorio"	2022	—	—	—		Aclarando la Mente
"Yo Perdí"	2022	—	—	—		Aclarando la Mente
"La Bailadora" (with Grupo Firme)	2022	—	18	—		Aclarando la Mente
"Amar a Mi Nivel" (with Vena de Rey)	2023	—	—	—		—N/a
"Con Todo Respetillo" (with Luis R. Conriquez)	2023	—	—	—		Mis Compas, Vol. 1
"La Escuela de Mi Apá" (with Vena de Rey)	2024	—	—	—		—N/a
"Somos" (with Los Plebes del Rancho de Ariel Camacho)	2024	—	—	—		Mis Compas, Vol. 1
"Cuando Llegue el Día" (with Gera MX)	2024	—	—	—		Mis Compas, Vol. 1
"Nuestro Camino" (with Ha*Ash)	2024	—	—	—		Haashville
"La Vida es Pa' Gozarla" (with Grupo Firme)	2025	—	—	—		Evolución
"Vete" (with Hernán Sepúlveda)	2026	—	—	—		Mis Compas El Final
"El Carrusel" (with Los Hijos de Barrón)	2026	—	—	—		Amar a Mi Nivel
"No Me Lo Mandes Decir"	2026	—	—	—		TBD
"La Jarra"	2026	—	—	—		TBD
"Tengo Tanto Que Contarte"	2026	—	—	—		TBD
"Una Derrota Así"	2026	—	—	—		TBD
"Las Cosas No Salieron"	2026	—	—	—		TBD
"Un Hilo"	2026	—	—	—		TBD

== Awards and nominations ==
Award	Year	Category	Nominated work	Result	Ref.
ASCAP Latin Awards	2016	Songwriter of the Year	Joss Favela	Won	
ASCAP Latin Awards	2017	Songwriter of the Year	Joss Favela	Won	
ASCAP Latin Awards	2018	Songwriter of the Year	Joss Favela	Won	
ASCAP Latin Awards	2021	Winning Songs	"La Mejor Versión de Mi (Remix)" (as songwriter)	Won	
Grammy Awards	2017	Best Regional Mexican Music Album (including Tejano)	Hecho a Mano	Nominated	
Grammy Awards	2020	Best Regional Mexican Music Album (including Tejano)	Caminando	Nominated	
Latin Grammy Awards	2015	Best Regional Song	"Me Sobrabas Tú" (as songwriter)	Nominated	
Latin Grammy Awards	2016	Best New Artist	Joss Favela	Nominated	
Latin Grammy Awards	2016	Best Norteño Album	Hecho a Mano	Nominated	
Latin Grammy Awards	2021	Best Banda Album	Llegando al Rancho	Nominated	
Latin Grammy Awards	2023	Best Norteño Album	Aclarando la Mente	Nominated	
Latin Grammy Awards	2023	Best Regional Mexican Song	"Aclarando la Mente"	Nominated	
Premios Juventud	2021	Best Mariachi Song - Ranchera	"El Alumno" (with Jessi Uribe)	Nominated	
Premios Juventud	2023	Best Regional Mexican Song	"Gato de Madrugada"	Nominated	
Premios Juventud	2023	Best Regional Mexican Collaboration	"La Bailadora" (with Grupo Firme)	Nominated	
Premios Juventud	2023	Best Regional Mexican Album	Aclarando la Mente	Nominated	
Premios Lo Nuestro	2019	Regional Mexican Male Artist of the Year	Joss Favela	Nominated	
Premios Lo Nuestro	2021	Regional Mexican Male Artist of the Year	Joss Favela	Nominated	
Premios Lo Nuestro	2021	Mariachi/Ranchera Song of the Year	"Claro y Obvio"	Nominated	
Premios Lo Nuestro	2022	Regional Mexican Male Artist of the Year	Joss Favela	Nominated	
Premios Lo Nuestro	2022	Regional Mexican Collaboration of the Year	"El Alumno" (with Jessi Uribe)	Nominated	
Premios Lo Nuestro	2022	Regional Mexican Album of the Year	Llegando al Rancho	Nominated	
Premios Lo Nuestro	2023	Regional Mexican Male Artist of the Year	Joss Favela	Nominated	
Premios Lo Nuestro	2023	Norteño Song of the Year	"Gato de Madrugada"	Nominated	
Premios Lo Nuestro	2023	Regional Mexican Album of the Year	Aclarando la Mente	Nominated	
