= Quiero Bailar (All Through the Night) =

2013 song performed by 3Ball MTY

Single by 3Ball MTY featuring Becky G

from the album Globall
- Language: Spanish; English
- Released: 24 September 2013
- Recorded: 2013
- Genre: Tribal guarachero; Latin pop; Pop rap
- Length: 4:17
- Label: Universal Music; Latin Power Music; Penca Records
- Producer: Dr. Luke

3Ball MTY singles chronology
"Besos al Airé" (2012)	"Quiero Bailar (All Through the Night)" (2013)	"La Noche Es Tuya" (2014)

Becky G singles chronology
"Becky from the Block" (2013)	"Quiero Bailar (All Through the Night)" (2013)	"Can't Get Enough" (2014)

Music video
- "Quiero Bailar (All Through The Night)" on YouTube

"Quiero Bailar (All Through the Night)" is a song by Mexican trio 3Ball MTY featuring American singer Becky G. The track, featuring Gomez rap-singing in Spanish and English, was released on 24 September 2013, as the lead single from their second studio album, Globall (2014). The song premiered on 10 September 2013 on Univision.

== Music video ==
The music video for the song was released to YouTube on 4 January 2014. It takes place in Venice, California and depicts Gomez performing a choreography in different places with backing dancers, spliced with scenes of the group doing various things such as skating, as well as several people partying. The music video has over 13 million views as of August 2020.

== Media Usage ==
The song is featured on the PlayStation 4 and Xbox One versions of the 2013 game, Need for Speed Rivals.

== Charts ==
Chart (2013)	Peak position
US Latin Pop Airplay (Billboard)	34

== Release history ==
Region	Date	Format	Label	Ref.
United States	September 24, 2013	Digital download	Universal Music; Latin Power Music; Penca Records	
