= Boys Will Be Boys (Paulina Rubio song) =

Single by Paulina Rubio

from the album Brava! Reload and Bravísima!
- Released: March 24, 2012
- Recorded: 2012
- Genre: Dance-pop, latin pop, house
- Length: 3:05
- Label: Universal
- Songwriters: Nadir Khayat, Alex Papaconstantinou, Bilal Hajji, Adam Baptiste
- Producers: Paulina Rubio, RedOne, Alex P

Paulina Rubio singles chronology
"Me voy" (2012)	"Boys Will Be Boys" (2012)	"All Around the World" (2012)

Music video
- "Boys Will Be Boys" (Official Music Video) on YouTube

Music video
- "Boys Will Be Boys" (Patrolla Remix) on YouTube

"Boys Will Be Boys" is a song recorded by Mexican recording artist Paulina Rubio. It was released as a lead single from the Brava!s reissues (Brava! Reload and Bravísima!) on March 24, 2012, by Universal Music, and distributed in both physical and digital formats. The track was written by Nadir Khayat, Alex Papaconstantinou, Bilal Hajji, Adam Baptiste, whilst production was handled by Khayat and Rubio. Its Rubio's first single in English-language since 2002. In 2013 it was included as part of the compilation album Pau Factor.

Musically, "Boys Will Be Boys" is a dance song that incorporates elements of techno, electro and latin sounds. Sonically compared to the work of Europop band Vengaboys and American recording artist Jennifer Lopez, the lyrical content is about how boys are searching for fun in a relationship, while the protagonist fall in love. Upon its release, "Boys Will Be Boys" was universally praised by music critics. The majority of them commended the dance sound and production, whilst some critics selected it as Rubio's best English-language song. Commercially, it performed moderately in regions such as Mexico and United States, where it managed to reach the top twenty spot on the Billboard Dance Club Songs chart. In Spain it was a success and certified gold by the Productores de Música de España.

An accompanying music video was directed by Yasha Malekzad in London; it featured Rubio as a femme fatale like Aphrodite and welcomes boys to play in a luxury house, but she and her helpers take their revenge of the gentlemen in the house with sexual fetishisms. The video was also praised by music critics, who complimented Rubio's sex appeal and the video's visuals. To promote the song, Rubio performed the track during the final of The X Factor US's third season, and the 2012 Billboard Latin Music Awards.

== Background and composition ==
"Boys Will Be Boys" is a Latin pop song with elements of dance and techno. It is the third English song in which RedOne and Paulina Rubio worked on, after "All Around the World" and "Heat of the Night," and fourth overall, also including Brava!'s lead single "Me Gustas Tanto." It is mainly based on guitar riffs and synthesizers. The bridge has been compared with the one on Vengaboys' song "Boom, Boom, Boom, Boom!!", and the overall production to Jennifer Lopez's hit single, "On The Floor", which was also produced by RedOne.

== Reception ==
The song received critical generally positive from critics, Daniela Caruso of Italian music platform Notizie Musica praised the song as "the best track in English in the prolific career of the Latin diva." Lansky Sam of MTV called the song "hallmarks of a big club smash". Joey Guerra from the Houston Chronicle name it a "hymn of the summer."

Enric Zapatero from Cromosoma X gave a somewhat mixed impression, commenting that it was a weird move to promote an album with a song that is not featured on it, and stating that "'Boys Will Be Boys' has been selected by the Mexican singer as a new single and it's pretty good, [the song] is very catchy and castañuelas always sound good in a latin song". He also stated that Rubio had the "idea of sounding like [Jennifer Lopez's] 'On the Floor'".

== Promotion and release ==
The song was released on March 24, 2012, on iTunes and Amazon in Europe countries first and then internationally. Later, it was released in Latin America. Paulina Rubio performed the song live for the first time on the 2012 ceremony if the Billboard Latin Music Awards on Telemundo.

The single was performed at the Sabado Gigante's 50th anniversary show on Univision.

On December 18, 2013 (more than a year later from its release) Paulina performed a new remix in The X Factor U.S final.

== Music video ==
The music video was directed by Yasha Malekzad and was produced by Jacuzzi Films Limited. It was filmed in London in early 2012. The video begins with Rubio emerging from some white curtains. In alternating scenes, several women play with different men in what appears to be an elite whorehouse. They employ sexual games, gerontophilic fetishes and sadomasochism. Rubio then appears in an elegant salon surrounded by several blindfolded boys who seem to be seduced by her movements. She approaches one of them and simulates a castration. Halfway through the video, an elegant man gets out of his car and enters the mansion, Rubio greets him with a strong whip and then kisses him biting his lip and two women drag him away. At the end, the white curtains, where Rubio came out at the beginning, are now red and she smiles while playing with the curtains.

The video was released on April 20, 2012. It was mentioned as one of the 30 Sexiest Music Videos of All Time, from the website of the Latin Magazine.

== Track listing ==
Digital download

No.	Title	Writer(s)	Producer(s)	Length
1.	"Boys Will Be Boys"	Paulina Rubio, RedOne	RedOne	3:05

== Chart performance ==
The single debuted at No.44 on the Spanish Singles Chart, and has so far reached No.2. The song also debuted at No.48 on US Hot Dance Club Songs (Billboard) without any promotion in the US and eventually peaked at No. 17.

=== Weekly charts ===
Chart (2012–2013)	Peak position
Mexico (Billboard Mexican Airplay)	7
Mexico (Monitor Latino)	11
Mexico General Airplay (Monitor Latino)	16
Spain (PROMUSICAE)	2
Spain Digital Song Sales (Billboard)	3
US Hot Dance Club Songs (Billboard)	17
US Latin Pop Songs (Billboard)	15
US Latin Airplay (Billboard)	32
US Tropical Songs (Billboard)	10

=== Year-end charts ===
Chart (2012)	Position
Spain Singles (PROMUSICAE)	14
Spain Radio (PROMUSICAE)	24

== Sales and certifications ==
Region	Certification	Certified units/sales
Spain (Promusicae)	Gold	20,000^{*}
Spain (Promusicae) Cahill Radio Edit Version	Gold	20,000^{*}
^{*} Sales figures based on certification alone.

== Release history ==
Digital releases
Country	Date	Format
United Kingdom	March 23, 2012	Digital download
Spain	March 23, 2012	Digital download
Argentina	March 23, 2012	Digital download
Chile	March 23, 2012	Digital download
Venezuela	March 23, 2012	Digital download
Colombia	March 23, 2012	Digital download
