= Brava! =

Album by Paulina Rubio

Studio album by Paulina Rubio
- Released: November 15, 2011
- Recorded: 2010–11
- Genres: Latin pop, dance-pop
- Length: 35:05
- Label: Universal Music Latino
- Producers: Casadiego, Bilal Hajji, Sebastian J., Jimmy Joker, AJ Junior, RedOne, Julio Reyes Copello, Teddy Sky, The Wizard

Paulina Rubio chronology
Gran City Pop: The Remixes (2010)	Brava! (2011)	Pau Factor (2013)

Singles from Brava!
- 1. "Me Gustas Tanto" Released: September 13, 2011; 2. "All Around the World" Released: December 13, 2012

Alternative cover
- Bravísima!

Singles from Bravísima!
- 1. "Me voy" Released: February 14, 2012; 2. "Boys Will Be Boys" Released: March 24, 2012

Brava! (Brave!) is the tenth studio album and second bilingual album by Mexican recording artist Paulina Rubio, released on November 15, 2011, by Universal Music Latino. Two of its three singles "Me Gustas Tanto" and "Boys Will Be Boys" became hits for Rubio.

In 2012, Brava! was reissued as two expanded editions titled Brava! Reload in Europe and Bravísima! in North America. At the same time, these expansions were also separately released as EPs in their respective regions containing the newly added songs. The album sold 100,000 copies worldwide.

== Background and production ==
In early August 2010, Paulina talked on her first Twitcam about her upcoming projects including her next studio album. She said that her new album will be "spanglish" and will include songs in Spanish and English. She also hoped that the first single of the new material would be released in the middle or the end of 2011. In May 2011, Paulina announced on Twitter that she and Moroccan/Swedish producer/songwriter RedOne were working together on new music in Madrid. Billboard reported: "She's been working with RedOne and writing with Julio Reyes Copello, Casadiego, Espinoza Paz, Chino & Nacho and Claudia Brant." Rubio later confirmed that RedOne was producing most of the 10 tracks on the standard edition of the album, with some arrangements "between techno and rock band instruments like bass, drums and acoustic guitar."

Paulina confirmed the titles of some of the tracks that would be on the album such as "Sabes Que Te Amo" and "Hoy Me Toca A Mí", which is a Spanglish duet with Taboo from The Black Eyed Peas. She also confirmed "Olvídate De Mí" and "Volvamos A Empezar", which is a ranchera mixed with a rock style feel. She also talked about "Cásate Con Tu Mamá", which is a song about a man with the Oedipus Complex Syndrome. Mexican composer Espinoza Paz confirmed that he worked with Paulina on a song titled "Me Voy". The song "Que Estuvieras Aquí" is a song dedicated to Rubio's father, who died early in 2011. As for the English songs, Universal Music confirmed the titles of two English songs. The album was recorded between New York, Los Angeles, Jamaica and Madrid. The album would result in a new sound for Paulina, as she worked with electronica and dance oriented music.

Paulina said that the reason she wanted to do a Spanglish album is that she wanted to mix the language of her home Mexico and the United States. "I grew up in Mexico, but I've always been between the United States and my country. This is all done with a wink and a nod to 'Spanglish' culture, which continues to grow and has a foot in both worlds," the singer said. She stated on a radio interview that this album would be different from all her other albums because being a mother and the death of her father have inspired her tremendously.

== Title ==
Paulina stated that "Brava!" is a key expression of female admiration that hints about the album being Paulina's tribute to women in all their greatness and potential. Rubio commented "The launch of this album comes at a time where I have more peace and feel more mature. The passing of a great pillar of my family and the birth of my first child have made me understand many things, especially the cycle of life and how important it is to celebrate it."

== Music and lyrics ==
Brava! is primarily a dance-pop, EDM, pop rock album, which "many nuances". Contains ten songs: eight in Spanish and two in English.

== Singles ==
"Me Gustas Tanto" (I Like You So Much) was released as the first single from the album. The song made its debut online as the lead single on September 2, 2011, and was made available for purchase on Amazon.com and iTunes on September 6, 2011, about a week before it was released as a digital single worldwide and sent to radio stations globally. The song was written by Rubio, along with Nacho, from the Venezuelan duo Chino & Nacho and Andrés Recio, and it was produced by (Lady Gaga fame) RedOne. The song has been remixed several times. There is a remix that shows Paulina Rubio singing the song as a duet with an artist named Gocho. There is a third version that was remixed by the group 3Ball MTY which has been popular with radio and fans alike.

A re-worked version of "Me Voy" featuring Espinoza Paz was released as the second single off the album on February 14, 2012. The official music video was released on March 20, 2012. The song was released as the theme song of a telenovela named "El Talismán". The radio version featuring Espinoza Paz was later released as on the re-release of "Brava!" under the name "Bravaisim".

"Heat of the Night" managed to debut at No. 46 on Billboard's Dance/Club Play Songs without being released as a single and has so far peaked at No. 16.

== Promotion ==
Rubio began promoting Brava! when she performed "Me Gustas Tanto" for the very first time in "Concierto EXA 3D" in Mexico City on October 22, 2011. She also video chatted with her fans through Twitter, where many of her fans got the once in a lifetime chance to ask her questions about her upcoming album. Rubio also attended the 12th Annual Latin Grammy Awards, and while she didn't perform any songs from Brava! she did perform "Golpes En El Corazón", a duet with Los Tigres del Norte. Paulina also confirmed her participation in Televisa's TV show La Voz... México. Paulina Rubio began an extensive promotional tour that took her through the United States as well as Spain before she went on to start a world tour in early 2012. Paulina Rubio began her promotional tour by appearing and singing "Me Gustas Tanto" on the final episode of Mira Quién Baila.

In March 2012, Rubio started officially her fourth solo concert tour, the Brava! Tour, in support of this album.

== Critical reception ==
Professional ratings
Review scores
Source	Rating
Allmusic	3/5 stars
Terra	3/5 stars

Brava! received mixed reviews from music critics. Jon O'Brian from Allmusic provided a favorable review describing the project as an "offer little [of] deviation from his usual Auto-Tuned synth-heavy formula", and felt it was "much more interesting proposition when Rubio furrows her own path" on different musical genres. David Dorantes from The Houston Chronicle said the album is perfect to Rubio's fans, "full of dance songs, of various genres, with light lyrics about falling in love or heartbreak.", but it "does not bring anything new to her career [and] also reflects a lack of unity in style."

The album was nominated for Pop Album of the Year at the Premios Lo Nuestro 2013.

== Commercial performance ==
In Mexico, the album started at No. 46 on the charts on pre-sales alone. The album later officially debuted in the No. 5 position in Mexico. Brava! debuted at No. 3 on the Billboard Top Latin Albums chart and No. 2 on Billboard's Latin Pop Albums. Brava! debuted at No. 26 in Spain. As of March 8, 2012 it sold over 28,000 in Mexico.

== Reissues ==
Rubio released two editions of this album that included all the songs she worked on with RedOne. Europe's edition was titled Brava! Reload and it was released on July 24, 2012, while the Latin American edition is called Bravísima! and it was released on September 18, 2012. Both editions include Rubio's hit song, "Boys Will Be Boys".

On July 24, 2012, she also released an EP titled Brava! Reload that also includes all the songs that she worked on with RedOne. This EP was only released in Europe and included seven tracks, including "Boys Will Be Boys", "Me Gustas Tanto", "Heat of the Night", "All Around The World" and the new songs "Loud" and "Say The Word" plus two remixes of "Boys Will Be Boys".

The other version of Brava!, released in Mexico and Latin America and titled Bravísima!, included all the tracks from Brava! and Brava! Reload plus Rubio's duet with Espinoza Paz, "Me Voy". A Bravísima! EP was released on October 22 in the US and it included only "Boys Will Be Boys", "Loud", "Say The Word" plus two remixes of "Boys Will Be Boys".

== Track listing ==
No.	Title	Writer(s)	Producer(s)	Length
1.	"Me Gustas Tanto"	Paulina Rubio; Miguel Ignacio Mendoza; Andrés Recio	RedOne	3:40
2.	"All Around The World"	Rubio; Nadir Khayat; Achraf Janussi; Bilal Hajji; Jimmy Joker; Teddy Sky	RedOne, Jimmy Joker, Teddy Sky	3:48
3.	"Cásate Con Tu Mamá"	Rubio; Adriana Lucía	The Wizard	2:38
4.	"Olvídate De Mí"	Rubio; Casadiego	Casadiego	2:53
5.	"Sabes Que Te Amo"	Rubio; Casadiego	Casadiego	3:28
6.	"Hoy Me Toca A Mí" (featuring Taboo)	Rubio; Larry Hernández; Taboo; Sebastian Jacome	Sebastian J.	4:04
7.	"Heat of the Night"	Rubio; Khayat; Janussi; Bilal Hajji; Jimmy Joker; Teddy Sky	RedOne, Jimmy Joker	3:30
8.	"Me Voy"	Rubio; Isidro Chávez; Marcela De La Garza	Casadiego	2:46
9.	"Que Estuvieras Aquí"	Rubio; De La Garza	Julio Reyes	4:55
10.	"Volvamos A Empezar"	Rubio; De La Garza	Julio Reyes	4:17

=== Brava! Reload ===
No.	Title	Writer(s)	Producer(s)	Length
1.	"Boys Will Be Boys"	Nadir Khayat; Alex Papaconstantinou; Bilal Hajji; Adam Baptiste	RedOne	3:05
2.	"All Around The World"	Rubio; Khaya; Achraf Janussi; Hajji; Jimmy Joker; Teddy Sky	RedOne, Jimmy Joker, Teddy Sky	3:48
3.	"Heat of the Night"	Rubio; Khaya; Hajji; Joker; Sky	RedOne, Jimmy Joker	3:30
4.	"Loud"	Rubio; Khaya; Hajji; Zayas; Sandell; Janussi	RedOne	3:21
5.	"Say The Word"	Khaya; Hajji; Zayas; Sandell; Janussi	RedOne	4:14
6.	"Me Gustas Tanto"	Rubio; Miguel Ignacio Mendoza; Andrés Recio	RedOne	3:40
7.	"Boys Will Be Boys" (Cahill Club Remix)	Khaya; Papaconstantinou; Hajji; Adam Baptiste		6:33
8.	"Boys Will Be Boys" (Patrolla Club Remix)	Khaya; Papaconstantinou; Hajji; Adam Baptiste		7:07

=== Bravísima! ===
Latin American version
No.	Title	Writer(s)	Producer(s)	Length
1.	"Me Gustas Tanto"	Paulina Rubio; Miguel Ignacio Mendoza; Andrés Recio	RedOne	3:40
2.	"All Around The World"	Rubio; Khaya; Achraf Janussi; Hajji; Jimmy Joker; Teddy Sky	RedOne, Jimmy Joker, Teddy Sky	3:48
3.	"Cásate con Tu Mamá"	Rubio; Adriana Lucía	The Wizard	2:38
4.	"Olvídate De Mí"	Rubio; Casadiego	Casadiego	2:53
5.	"Sabes Que Te Amo"	Rubio; Casadiego	Casadiego	3:28
6.	"Hoy Me Toca A Mí" (featuring Taboo)	Rubio; Larry Hernández; Taboo; Sebastian Jacome	Sebastian J.	4:04
7.	"Heat of the Night"	Rubio; Khaya; Achraf Janussi; Hajji; Joker; Sky	RedOne, Jimmy Joker	3:30
8.	"Me Voy"	Rubio; Isidro Chávez; Marcela De La Garza	Casadiego	2:46
9.	"Que Estuvieras Aquí"	Rubio; De La Garza	Julio Reyes	4:55
10.	"Volvamos A Empezar"	Rubio; De La Garza	Julio Reyes	4:17
11.	"Boys Will Be Boys"	Khaya; Papaconstantinou; Hajji; Adam Baptiste	RedOne	3:05
12.	"Say The Word"	Khaya; Hajji; Zayas; Sandell; Janussi	RedOne	4:14
13.	"Loud"	Khaya; Hajji; Zayas; Sandell; Janussi	RedOne	3:21
14.	"Me Voy" (featuring Espinoza Paz)	Rubio; Chávez; De La Garza	Casadiego	2.50
15.	"Me Gustas Tanto" (3Ball MTY Remix)	Rubio; Mendoza; Recio	RedOne	3:40
16.	"Boys Will Be Boys" (Cahill Club Mix)	Khaya; Papaconstantinou; Hajji; Baptiste		6:33
17.	"Boys Will Be Boys" (Patrolla Club Remix)	Khaya; Papaconstantinou; Hajji; Baptiste		7:07

American version
No.	Title	Writer(s)	Producer(s)	Length
1.	"Boys Will Be Boys"	Khaya; Papaconstantinou; Hajji; Baptiste	RedOne	3:05
2.	"Say The Word"	Khaya; Hajji; Zayas; Sandell; Janussi	RedOne	4:14
3.	"Loud"	Khaya; Hajji; Zayas; Sandell; Janussi	RedOne	3:21
4.	"Me Gustas Tanto" (3BallMTY Remix)	Rubio; Mendoza; Recio		3:40
5.	"Boys Will Be Boys" (Cahill Club Mix)	Khaya; Papaconstantinou; Hajji; Baptiste		6:33
6.	"Boys Will Be Boys" (Patrolla Club Remix)	Khaya; Papaconstantinou; Hajji; Baptiste		7:07

== Charts ==
=== Weekly charts ===
Chart (2011)	Peak position
Mexican Albums (Top 100 Mexico)	5
Spanish Albums (Promusicae)	26
US Top Latin Albums (Billboard)	3
US Latin Pop Albums (Billboard)	2
US Top Current Albums (Billboard)	143

=== Year-end charts ===
Chart (2011)	Position
Mexican Albums Chart	96

== Release history ==
Region	Date	Format	Label	Edition(s)
Mexico	November 15, 2011	CD, digital download	Universal Music Latin	Standard
United States	November 15, 2011	CD, digital download	Universal Music Latin	Standard
Argentina	November 15, 2011	CD, digital download	Universal Music Latin	Standard
Spain	November 29, 2011	CD, digital download	Universal Music Latin	Standard
