= Heat of the Night (Paulina Rubio song) =

Song by Paulina Rubio

from the album Brava!
- Released: November 15, 2011
- Recorded: 2011
- Genre: Dance, electropop
- Length: 4:31
- Label: Universal Music Latino
- Songwriters: RedOne, Junior, Hajil, Joker, Sky
- Producer: RedOne

Audio video
- "Heat Of The Night" on YouTube

"Heat of the Night" is a song by Mexican pop artist Paulina Rubio from her album, Brava!. The song was written by RedOne, Junior, Hajil, Joker, Sky and produced by RedOne. It was expected to be the 2nd single off the album, however, Paulina released "Me voy" instead. The song was originally produced for Jennifer Lopez and set to be on her 7th studio album Love?.

This song can also be found on the singer's most recent EPs, Brava! Reload and Bravísima!

== Reception ==
Joey Guerra from the Houston Chronicle name it a "hymn of the summer", while Mike Wass from Idolator considering it as a "sultry dance anthem." Terra called it a "fresh" song that serves as "an incitement to the dance floor."

== Chart performance ==
Although the song wasn't released as a single, it reached the Billboard Dance/Club Play Songs chart, peaking at No. 16.

== Live performances ==
Paulina performed the song on a TV show in Spain.

== Charts ==
Chart (2012)	Peak position
US Dance Club Songs (Billboard)	16
