= Latin American Music Awards of 2018 =

4th annual edition of the Latin American Music Awards

4th Annual Latin American Music Award
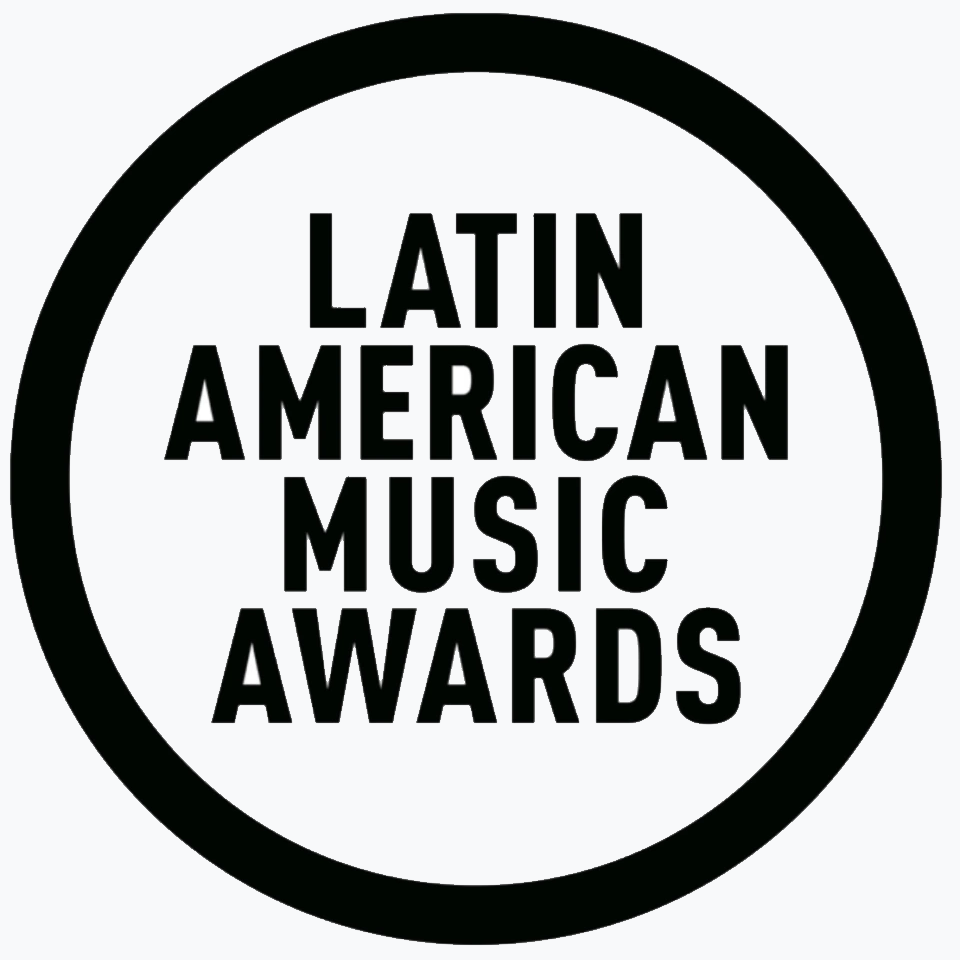
- Latin American Music Award Logo
- Date: October 25, 2018
- Location: Dolby Theatre; Los Angeles, California
- Country: United States
- Hosted by: Becky G, Gloria Trevi, Leslie Grace, Roselyn Sanchez and Aracely Arambula
- Most awards: CNCO and Ozuna (3)
- Most nominations: J Balvin and Ozuna (9)
- Website: Telemundo-Latin American Music Awards

Television/radio coverage
- Network: Telemundo
- Produced by: Dick Clark Productions and SOMOS Productions

The 4th Latin American Music Awards were held at the Dolby Theatre in Los Angeles, California. It was broadcast live on Telemundo. J Balvin and Ozuna led the nominations with nine each. The latter and boyband CNCO got the most awards with three each, and the group won all of their nominations.

== Performers ==
| Artist(s) | Song(s) |
|---|---|
| Wisin & Yandel | "Reggaetón en lo Oscuro" |
| Zion & Lennox | "Hola" |
| Pitbull; Ludacris; Prince Royce | "Quiero Saber" & "Dame Tu Cosita" |
| Christian Nodal | "Adiós Amor" |
| Farruko | "Inolvidable" |
| Maluma | "Mala Mía" |
| Leslie Grace; Becky G CNCO | "Díganle (Remix)" |
| Anitta | "Medicina" |
| Gloria Trevi | "Ellas Son Yo" |
| Joss Favela; Becky G | "Pienso en Ti" |
| Daddy Yankee | "Yo Contra Ti" |
| Lele Pons | "Celoso" |
| CNCO | "Se Vuelve Loca" |
| Prince Royce; Maluma | "El Clavo (Remix)" |
| Álvaro Soler; Flo Rida; TINI | "La Cintura (Remix)" |

== Winners ==
The nominations were announced on September 18, 2018

- Daddy Yankee Wins "Icon Award"
- Maluma Wins "Extraordinary Evolution Award"

| Artist of the Year | New Artist of the Year |
|---|---|
| Bad Bunny – Winner; Banda MS de Sergio Lizárraga; Christian Nodal; Daddy Yankee; J Balvin; Luis Fonsi; Maluma; Nicky Jam; Ozuna; Shakira | Sebastián Yatra – Winner; Bad Bunny; Manuel Turizo; Raymix |
| Song of the Year | Album of the Year |
| Luis Fonsi & Demi Lovato - "Échame la Culpa" – Winner; Becky G feat. Bad Bunny - "Mayores"; Daddy Yankee - "Dura"; J Balvin & Willy William feat. Beyoncé - "Mi Gente"; Maluma & Nego do Borel - "Corazón"; Nicky Jam & J Balvin - "X"; Wisin feat. Ozuna - "Escápate Conmigo" | Ozuna – Odisea – Winner; Christian Nodal – Me Dejé Llevar; J Balvin – Vibras; Nicky Jam – Fénix; Wisin – Victory |
| Favorite Female Artist | Favorite Male Artist |
| Becky G – Winner; Jennifer Lopez; Karol G; Natti Natasha; Shakira | Daddy Yankee – Winner; J Balvin; Maluma; Nicky Jam; Ozuna |
| Favorite Duo or Group | Favorite Pop Artist |
| CNCO – Winner; Banda MS de Sergio Lizárraga; Calibre 50; La Arrolladora Banda El Limón de René Camacho; Zion & Lennox | CNCO – Winner; Luis Fonsi; Shakira |
| Favorite Pop Album | Favorite Pop Song |
| CNCO – CNCO – Winner; Juanes – Mis Planes Son Amarte; Sebastián Yatra – Mantra | Carlos Vives & Sebastián Yatra - "Robarte un Beso" – Winner; Enrique Iglesias feat. Bad Bunny - "El Baño"; Luis Fonsi & Demi Lovato - "Échame La Culpa"; Reik feat. Ozuna & Wisin - "Me Niego"; Shakira & Nicky Jam - "Perro Fiel" |
| Favorite Regional Mexican Artist | Favorite Regional Mexican Album |
| Christian Nodal – Winner; Banda MS de Sergio Lizárraga; Calibre 50 | Christian Nodal – Me Dejé Llevar – Winner; Banda MS de Sergio Lizárraga – La Mejor Versión De Mí; T3r Elemento –Underground |
| Favorite Regional Mexican Song | Favorite Urban Artist |
| Raymix - "Oye Mujer" – Winner; Banda MS de Sergio Lizárraga - "Tu Postura"; Calibre 50 - "Corrido de Juanito"; Christian Nodal - "Me Dejé Llevar"; La Arrolladora Banda el Limón de René Camacho - "Entre Beso y Beso" | Ozuna – Winner; J Balvin; Maluma |
| Favorite Urban Song | Favorite Urban Album |
| Becky G feat. Bad Bunny - "Mayores" – Winner; Daddy Yankee - "Dura"; J Balvin & Willy William feat. Beyoncé - "Mi Gente"; Nicky Jam & J Balvin - "X"; Wisin feat. Ozuna - "Escápate Conmigo" | Ozuna – Odisea– Winner; J Balvin – Vibras; Yandel – #Update |
| Favorite Tropical Artist | Favorite Tropical Song |
| Romeo Santos – Winner; Gente de Zona; Nacho | Nacho - "Báilame" – Winner; Romeo Santos feat. Nicky Jam & Daddy Yankee - "Bella y Sensual"; Romeo Santos feat. Ozuna - "Sobredosis"; Silvestre Dangond & Nicky Jam - "Cásate Conmigo"; Steve Aoki, Daddy Yankee, Play-N-Skilz & Elvis Crespo - "Azukita" |
| Favorite Tropical Album | Favorite Crossover Artist |
| Victor Manuelle – 25/7 – Winner; Carlos Vives – VIVES; Orquesta Akokán – Orquesta Akokán | Camila Cabello – Winner; Cardi B; Demi Lovato |
| Favorite Tour | Favorite Video |
| Luis Miguel – "México Por Siempre Tour" – Winner; Enrique Iglesias & Pitbull – "Enrique Iglesias and Pitbull Live"; Jennifer Lopez – "Jennifer Lopez : All I Have"; Romeo Santos – "Golden Tour"; Timbiriche – "Juntos Tour" | Anitta – "Medicina" – Winner; Juanes – "Pa Dentro"; Nacho – "No te Vas"; Residente & Dillon Francis Feat. iLe – "Sexo"; Ricardo Arjona – "El Cielo a Mi Favor" |

== Multiple nominations and awards ==
Acts that received multiple nominations
| Nominations | Act |
|---|---|
| 9 | J Balvin |
| 9 | Ozuna |
| 8 | Nicky Jam |
| 6 | Daddy Yankee |
| 5 | Bad Bunny |
| 5 | Banda Sinaloense MS de Sergio Lizárraga |
| 5 | Christian Nodal |
| 4 | Luis Fonsi |
| 4 | Maluma |
| 4 | Romeo Santos |
| 4 | Shakira |
| 4 | Wisin |
| 3 | Becky G |
| 3 | Calibre 50 |
| 3 | CNCO |
| 3 | Demi Lovato |
| 3 | Nacho |
| 3 | Sebastián Yatra |
| 2 | Beyoncé |
| 2 | Carlos Vives |
| 2 | Enrique Iglesias |
| 2 | Jennifer Lopez |
| 2 | Juanes |
| 2 | La Arrolladora Banda El Limon |
| 2 | Raimix |
| 2 | Willy William |

Acts that received multiple awards
| Awards | Act |
|---|---|
| 3 | CNCO |
| 3 | Ozuna |
| 2 | Bad Bunny |
| 2 | Becky G |
| 2 | Christian Nodal |
| 2 | Sebastián Yatra |
