= Pienso en Ti (Joss Favela and Becky G song) =

2018 single by Joss Favela and Becky G

Single by Joss Favela and Becky G

from the album Caminando
- Language: Spanish
- English title: "I Think of You"
- Released: October 19, 2018
- Genre: Regional Mexican; Country
- Length: 3:03
- Label: Sony Latin
- Songwriter: Joss Favela
- Producer: Joss Favela

Joss Favela singles chronology
"Quiero" (2018)	"Pienso en Ti" (2018)	"La Magia de Tus Ojos" (2019)

Becky G singles chronology
"Díganle (Remix)" (2018)	"Pienso en Ti" (2018)	"Booty" (2018)

Music video
- "Pienso en Ti" on YouTube

"Pienso en Ti" is a song by Mexican singer-songwriter Joss Favela and American singer Becky G. Released by Sony Music Latin on October 19, 2018, it was written by Joss Favela. It was released as the third single from his second album, Caminando (2019).

== Music video ==
The music video was directed by Kenneth O’ Brien. The music video was released alongside the song on October 19.

== Live performances ==
Favela performed the song with Becky G at the Latin American Music Awards of 2018.

== Accolades ==
Awards and nominations for "Pienso en Ti"
Organization	Year	Category	Result	Ref.
Latin Music Italian Awards	2018	My Favorite Lirycs	Nominated	

== Charts ==
Chart (2018)	Peak position
US Latin Digital Song Sales (Billboard)	15
