= Mexican pointy boots =

Cowboy boot with a long, extended toe

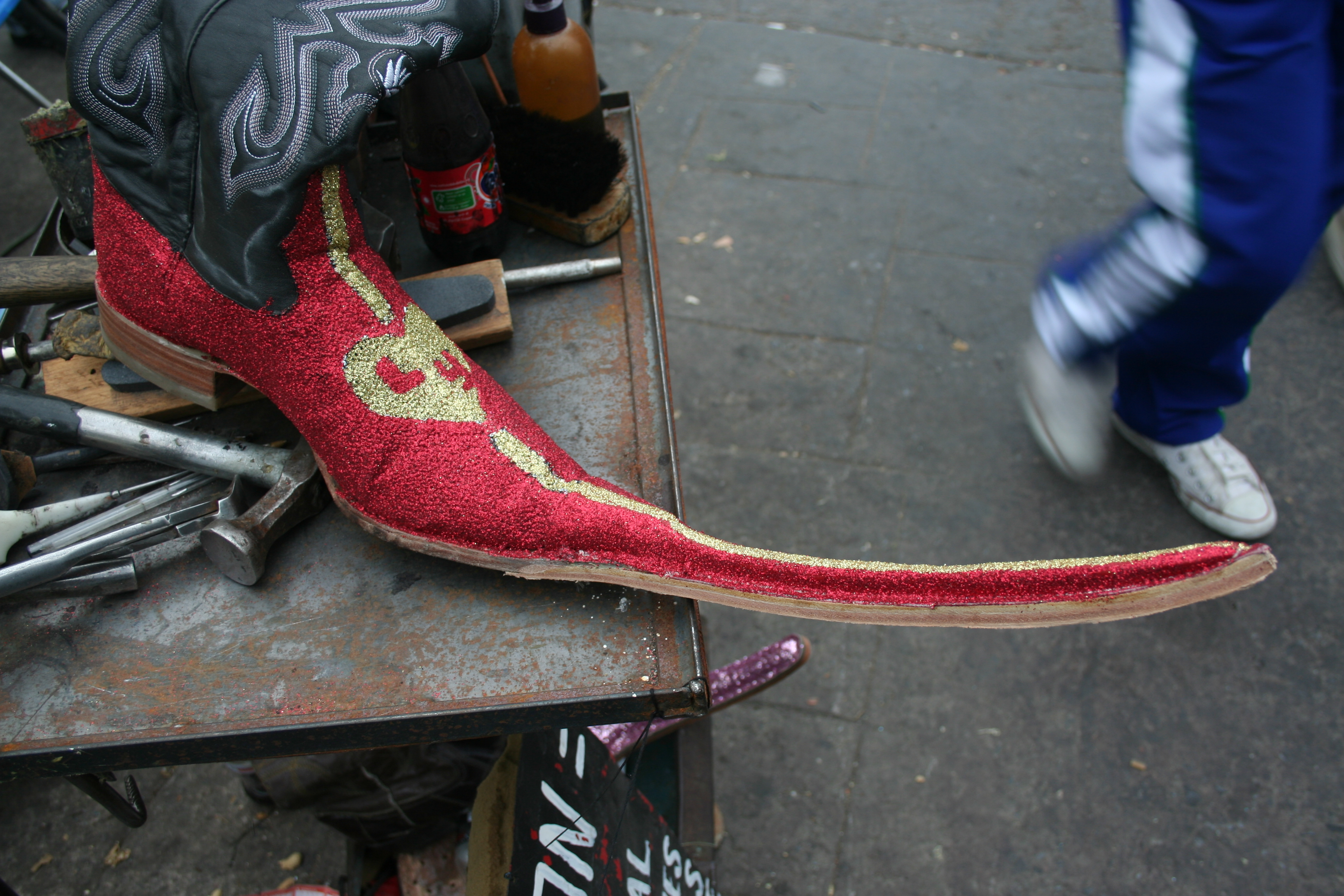
A red Mexican pointy boot

Mexican pointy boots (Spanish: Botas picudas mexicanas) or tribal boots (Spanish: botas tribaleras) are a style of pointed fashion boots made with elongated toes that were a popular footwear for men in parts of Mexico. The boots were commonly worn in an ironic and comedic way by males involved in the tribal guarachero music subculture that thrived in the early 2010s.

== Origin and expansion ==
The boots originated in an unknown location sometime before 2002 and were used in Mazatlan, Sinaloa, during carnival by many performers. Following their creation, the trend had expanded to parts of the United States, particularly in Dallas, Texas, but also in Tennessee, Mississippi and Oklahoma.

== Design ==
The pointy boots are made by elongating the toe of normal boots by as much as 5 feet (1.5 m), causing the toes to curl up toward the knees. The boots are then further modified according to the wearer's personal taste. Alterations incorporate paint and sequins and can go as far as adding flashing LEDs, disco balls, and mirrors.

== Dancing ==
The appearance of the pointy boots has coincided with the popularity of "tribal guarachero" electronic music, hyphy tribal or tribal. Tribal music has been described as "a mixture of Pre-Columbian sounds mixed with fast cumbia bass and electro house beats." Boys and men that wear the pointy boots have formed all-male troupes (Group dance teams) to compete in danceoffs at local nightclubs to tribal music. Participants in the contests spend weeks choreographing their dance moves and fabricating their outfits which commonly include "matching western shirts and skinny jeans to accentuate their footwear." In Monterrey, prize money ranges from $100 to $500. The prize often includes a bottle of whiskey.

The dance troupes have reportedly become so popular that they are being hired to entertain "at weddings, for quinceañeras, celebrations of the Virgin of Guadalupe and bachelorette parties" and there is even one report of a crew entertaining after a funeral.

== See also ==
- List of shoe styles
- Pointed shoe (disambiguation)
- Tribal guarachero
