= All Around the World (Paulina Rubio song) =

Single by Paulina Rubio

from the album Brava!, Brava! Reload and Bravísima!
- Released: December 13, 2012
- Recorded: 2011
- Genre: EDM
- Length: 3:48
- Label: Universal
- Songwriters: RedOne, Paulina Rubio, AJ Junior, Bilial Hajil, Jimmy Joker, Teddy Sky
- Producers: RedOne, Joker, Sky

Paulina Rubio singles chronology
"Boys Will Be Boys" (2012)	"All Around the World" (2012)	"Mi Nuevo Vicio" (2015)

Audio video
- "All Around The World" on YouTube

"All Around The World" is a song by Mexican pop artist Paulina Rubio from her album, Brava!. The song was written by RedOne, Paulina Rubio, AJ Junior, Bilial Hajil, Jimmy Joker, Teddy Skyand produced by RedOne, Joker, Sky. This song was used as the official theme song for the 2012 Zumba Fitness “Party in Pink” campaign. It was released as a single on December 13, 2012.

“The message, the vibe, the energy… Zumba and I are a fit,” Rubio told Latina magazine about her new partnership with Zumba. “Tonight is the perfect night to debut the single because it’s all about enthusiasm. It’s all about energy, and about reaching people from all around the globe. Zumba does that and so does my music. That’s why we’re here tonight.”

== Live performances ==
Paulina performed the song during Zumba's “Fitness-Concert.”
