= La Voz Kids (Mexican TV series) season 3 =

La Voz Kids
- Season 3
- Hosted by: Eddy Vilard
- Coaches: Camilo; Belinda; Mau y Ricky; María José
- No. of contestants: 60 artists
- Winner: Randy Ortíz
- Winning coach: Belinda
- Runners-up: Renata Tello; Santiago Flores; Erick Elian

Release
- Original network: Azteca Uno
- Original release: March 22 – April 27, 2021

The third season of La Voz Kids premiered on March 22, 2021, being the first season of this spin-off to be broadcast on Azteca Uno. The coaching panel consisted of Camilo, Belinda, María José and the duet Mau y Ricky. Eddy Vilard served as the only host this season.

== Coaches ==
Coaches of La Voz Kids season 3

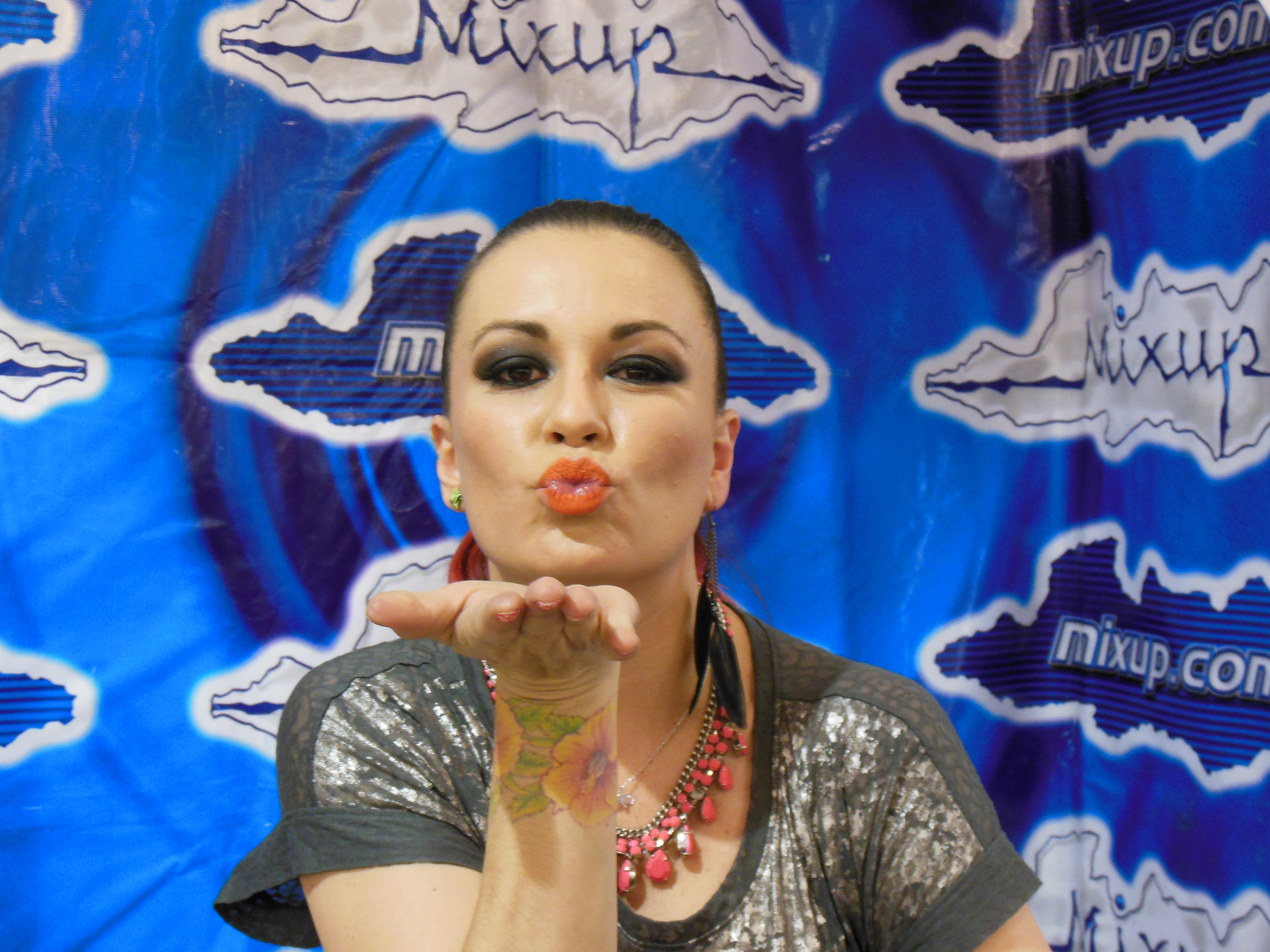
María José

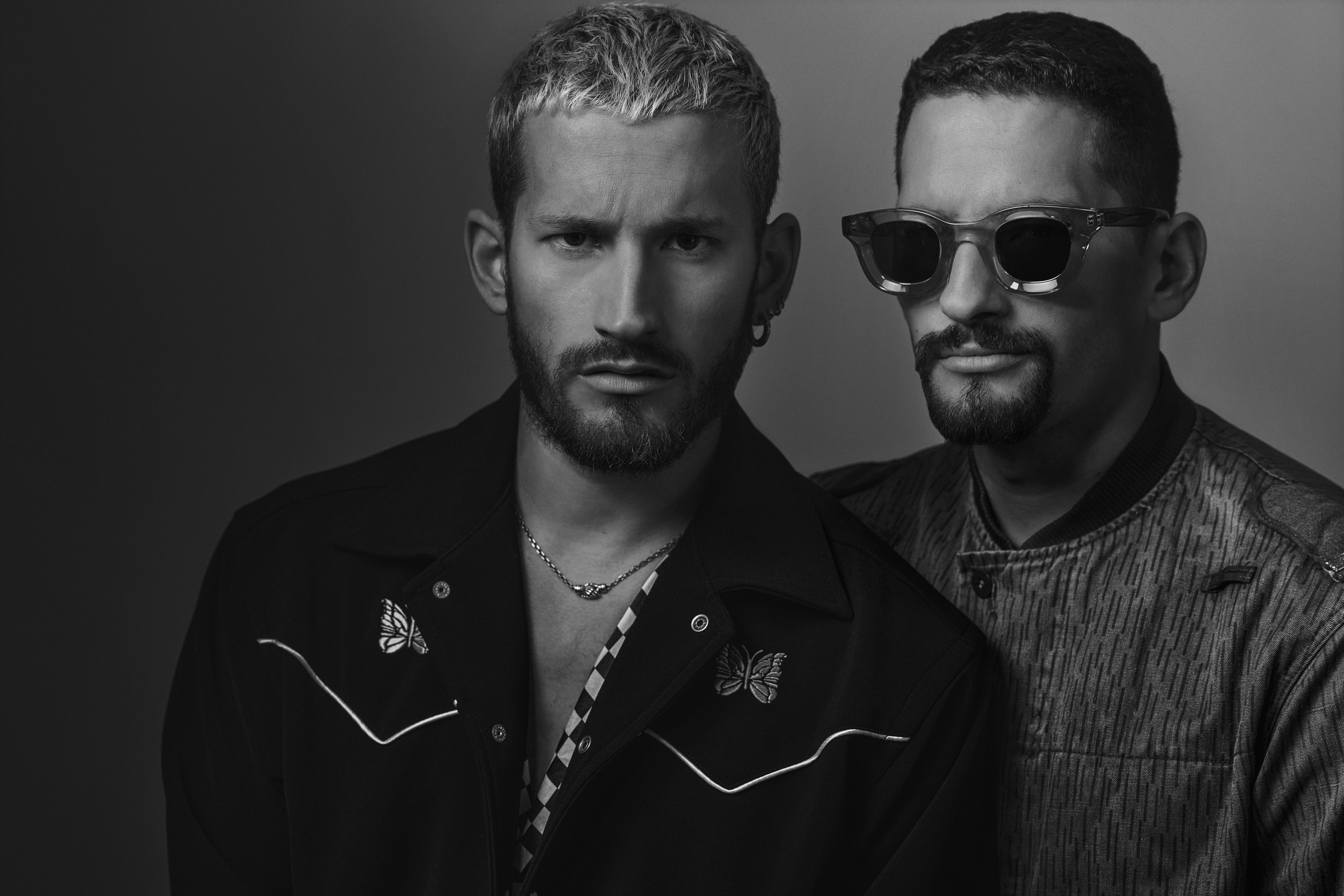
Mau y Ricky

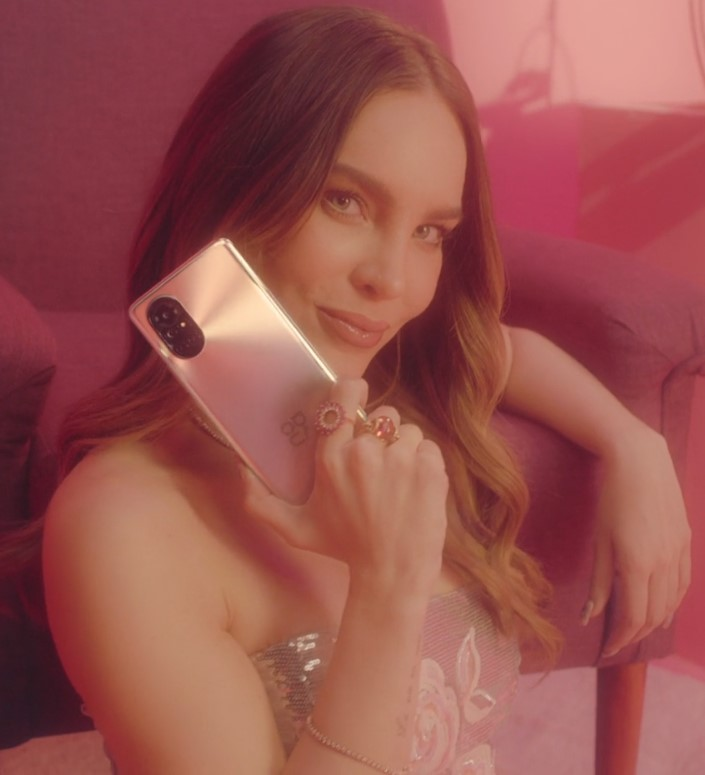
Belinda

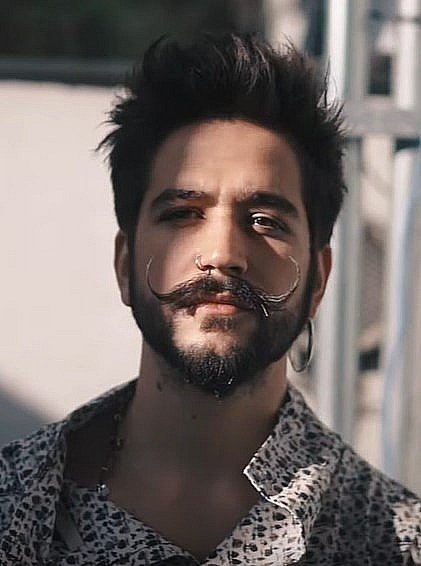
Camilo

This season was taped between September and October 2021, following the end of the adult version's ninth season. From that edition, Belinda and María José returned for their fourth and second season as coaches of the franchise. Whereas, Camilo and Mau y Ricky debuted as coaches. With this, this was the first kids edition produced in Mexico featuring four coaches.

== Teams ==
Color key

Winner
Runner-up
Eliminated in the Final
Eliminated in the Semifinal
Eliminated in the Knockouts

== Blind auditions ==
In the Blind auditions, each coach had to complete their teams with 15 contestants.

Blind auditions color key
| ✔ | Coach pressed "QUIERO TU VOZ" button |
| | Artist defaulted to a coach's team |
| | Artist elected a coach's team |
| | Artist was eliminated with no coach pressing his or her "QUIERO TU VOZ" button |

=== Episode 1 (March 22) ===
At the beginning of the episode, the coaches performed a Spanish version of "Just the Way You Are"

| Order | Artist | Age | Hometown | Song | Coach's and artist's choices | | | |
| Order | Artist | Age | Hometown | Song | Camilo | Belinda | Mau y Ricky | María Jose |
|---|---|---|---|---|---|---|---|---|
| 1 | Sofía González | 11 | Gómez Palacio, Durango | "La basurita" | ✔ | ✔ | ✔ | ✔ |
| 2 | Salomón Saldaña | 11 | Mexico City | "Calma" | – | – | – | – |
| 3 | Renata Tello | 11 | Mexico City | "Dear Future Husband" | – | ✔ | ✔ | ✔ |
| 4 | Daniel Camarena | 9 | Uruapan, Michoacán | "Cuando yo quería ser grande" | – | – | – | – |
| 5 | Leyli Lucero | 9 | Chihuahua, Chihuahua | "Mi buen corazón" | ✔ | ✔ | ✔ | ✔ |
| 6 | Ferchis Méndez | 5 | Monterrey, Nuevo León | "Hawái" | ✔ | ✔ | – | – |
| 7 | Daniel Méndez | 10 | Monterrey, Nuevo León | "Treasure" | – | ✔ | ✔ | ✔ |
| 8 | Ale Rivera | 7 | State of Mexico | "Sálvame" | – | – | ✔ | ✔ |
| 9 | Jilguerillo de Tlaxcala | 9 | Tlaxcala, Tlaxcala | "Ay Chabela" | ✔ | ✔ | ✔ | ✔ |
| 10 | Alex Gricco | 13 | Ciudad Victoria, Tamaulipas | "Chandelier" | ✔ | ✔ | ✔ | ✔ |
| 11 | Manu | 11 | Mexico City | "Hijo de la Luna" | – | – | – | – |
| 12 | Kristiane | 13 | Mexico City | "Fly Me to the Moon" | ✔ | ✔ | ✔ | ✔ |
| 13 | Mario Ramón | 9 | Mérida, Yucatán | "When I Was Your Man" | – | ✔ | – | ✔ |

=== Episode 2 (March 23) ===
During the episode, María José performed "Él era perfecto"

| Order | Artist | Age | Hometown | Song | Coach's and artist's choices | | | |
| Order | Artist | Age | Hometown | Song | Camilo | Belinda | Mau y Ricky | María Jose |
|---|---|---|---|---|---|---|---|---|
| 1 | Christian González | 11 | Mexico City | "¿Cómo pagarte?" | ✔ | ✔ | – | ✔ |
| 2 | Alex Carlin | 13 | Aguascalientes, Aguascalientes | "Regresame mi corazón" | – | – | – | – |
| 3 | Salma "La Mexicana" | 10 | Apatzingán, Michoacán | "Si quieres verme llorar" | ✔ | ✔ | – | – |
| 4 | Fátima | 9 | State of Mexico | "Te quiero tanto, tanto" | – | – | – | – |
| 5 | Romina Miramontes | 10 | Chihuahua, Chihuahua | "Día de enero" | – | – | ✔ | – |
| 6 | Erick Elian | 10 | Mexicali, Baja California | "I Want You Back" | – | ✔ | ✔ | ✔ |
| 7 | Álvaro Márquez | 8 | Oaxtepec, Morelos | "¡Que bonito!" | – | – | – | – |
| 8 | Alexa Yutxil | 9 | Tijuana, Baja California | "Canto a la madre" | ✔ | ✔ | ✔ | ✔ |
| 9 | Valentina Corona | 10 | Cuernavaca, Morelos | "Nunca es suficiente" | ✔ | ✔ | ✔ | ✔ |
| 10 | Ximena | 10 | Metepec, State of Mexico | "Mi buen amor" | ✔ | ✔ | ✔ | ✔ |
| 11 | Nicole Maldonado | 8 | Cerro Azul, Veracruz | "El color de tus ojos" | ✔ | ✔ | ✔ | ✔ |
| 12 | Mauro Guzmán | 8 | Mexico City | "Amor primero" | – | – | – | ✔ |
| 13 | Hermanos Cedillo (Damián & Leonardo Cedillo) | 7 y 9 | Saltillo, Coahuila | "A través del vaso" | ✔ | ✔ | ✔ | ✔ |

=== Episode 3 (March 29) ===
During the episode, Camilo performed "Favorito"

| Order | Artist | Age | Hometown | Song | Coach's and artist's choices | | | |
| Order | Artist | Age | Hometown | Song | Camilo | Belinda | Mau y Ricky | María Jose |
|---|---|---|---|---|---|---|---|---|
| 1 | Alexis Rodríguez | 9 | Tehuacán, Puebla | "Decídete" | – | – | – | ✔ |
| 2 | Hoguer Torres | 8 | Ajuchitlán del Progreso, Guerrero | "Acá entre nos" | – | – | – | – |
| 3 | Camila RM | 11 | Guadalajara, Jalisco | "El amor coloca" | ✔ | ✔ | – | ✔ |
| 4 | Carlos Gael | 13 | San Luis Potosí, San Luis Potosí | "Still Loving You" | ✔ | ✔ | ✔ | ✔ |
| 5 | Alexandra Marie | 11 | Mexico City | "Cómo mirarte" | ✔ | ✔ | ✔ | ✔ |
| 6 | Randy Ortíz | 11 | Cuauhtémoc, Chihuahua | "Mi enemigo el amor" | ✔ | ✔ | ✔ | ✔ |
| 7 | Johan Herrera | 10 | State of Mexico | "Perdóname" | – | – | – | ✔ |
| 8 | Lupita Villanueva | 9 | Ayutla de los Libres, Guerrero | "Un año" | – | – | – | – |
| 9 | Edson "El Charrito Jr. Jr." | 9 | Mexico City | "Yo no fui" | – | – | – | – |
| 10 | Tati Pascual | 10 | Mexico City | "Una mañana" | ✔ | ✔ | ✔ | – |
| 11 | Oscar Patricio | 10 | León, Guanajuato | "La Bamba" | ✔ | ✔ | – | – |
| 12 | Regina Morelos | 12 | Morelia, Michoacán | "Mi error, mi fantasía" | – | – | – | – |
| 13 | Romina Go | 9 | León, Guanajuato | "Besos de ceniza" | ✔ | ✔ | ✔ | – |

=== Episode 4 (March 30) ===
During the episode, Mau y Ricky performed "Perdóname"

| Order | Artist | Age | Hometown | Song | Coach's and artist's choices | | | |
| Order | Artist | Age | Hometown | Song | Camilo | Belinda | Mau y Ricky | María Jose |
|---|---|---|---|---|---|---|---|---|
| 1 | Wendy | 9 | Toluca, State of Mexico | "Como yo nadie te ha amado" | ✔ | ✔ | – | – |
| 2 | Oliver Zúñiga "Rancherito de Oro" | 13 | Tula, Hidalgo | "Mi piquito de oro" | – | – | – | – |
| 3 | Angel Galván | 9 | Cuauhtémoc, Chihuahua | "Te esperaba" | – | – | – | ✔ |
| 4 | Ziadany Castillo | 11 | Cuernavaca, Morelos | "Sabor a mí" | – | ✔ | ✔ | – |
| 5 | Nico Nicstar | 10 | Mexico City | "Te he prometido" | – | – | – | – |
| 6 | Faryan | 12 | Puebla, Puebla | "Dime" | ✔ | ✔ | ✔ | – |
| 7 | Valentina Benítez | 11 | Mexico City | "Titanium" | – | ✔ | ✔ | ✔ |
| 8 | Santiago Flores | 6 | Hermosillo, Sonora | "Mi salón está de fiesta" | ✔ | ✔ | ✔ | ✔ |
| 9 | Santiago Toledo | 8 | Chihuahua, Chihuahua | "You Are the Reason" | – | ✔ | – | – |
| 9 | Andrey Cabrera | 12 | Ticumán, Morelos | "Anoche yo me enamoré" | ✔ | ✔ | ✔ | ✔ |
| 10 | Azul Ramírez | 10 | Ciudad Victoria, Tamaulipas | "Count On Me" | ✔ | ✔ | ✔ | ✔ |
| 11 | Luis Enrique "El Palomito" | 12 | State of Mexico | "Por amarte así" | – | – | – | – |
| 12 | Valentina Guevara | 7 | Cuernavaca, Morelos | "La chancla" | ✔ | ✔ | ✔ | – |
| 13 | Romina Hernández | 12 | Chihuahua, Chihuahua | "Shallow" | – | – | – | – |

=== Episode 5 (April 5) ===
During the episode, María José performed "El amor coloca" and Belinda performed "Bella traición"

| Order | Artist | Age | Hometown | Song | Coach's and artist's choices | | | |
| Order | Artist | Age | Hometown | Song | Camilo | Belinda | Mau y Ricky | María Jose |
|---|---|---|---|---|---|---|---|---|
| 1 | Mariana "La Charrita" | 11 | Monclova, Coahuila | "Ya te olvidé" | ✔ | – | ✔ | – |
| 2 | Joey Hernández | 7 | Tijuana, Baja California | "La nave del olvido" | – | – | – | – |
| 3 | Emily Laurent | 7 | Purísima del Rincón, Guanajuato | "Ladrón" | ✔ | – | ✔ | – |
| 4 | Jan Pablo | 11 | Chihuahua, Chihuahua | "Digale" | ✔ | – | ✔ | – |
| 5 | Mabel | 11 | Mexico City | "Lo que son las cosas" | ✔ | ✔ | ✔ | – |
| 6 | Luis Enrique | 13 | Frontera, Coahuila | "En peligro de extinción" | ✔ | – | ✔ | – |
| 7 | Anaís González | 13 | Quebec, Canada | "Pour que tu m'aimes encore" | ✔ | ✔ | ✔ | ✔ |
| 8 | Luis Ángel Montes | 11 | Pihuamo, Jalisco | "La Charreada" | ✔ | – | ✔ | – |
| 9 | Mía Sofía Veléz | 9 | Mexico City | "Rosas" | – | – | – | – |
| 10 | Daniel Pozo | 9 | La Paz, Baja California | "Terrenal" | – | – | ✔ | – |
| 11 | Sarah Jade | 10 | Mexico City | "A Thousand Years" | ✔ | ✔ | ✔ | ✔ |
| 12 | Dario | 9 | Playa del Carmen, Quintana Roo | "Nunca voy a olvidarte" | – | – | – | – |
| 13 | Sophia Fernanda | 10 | Ciudad Juárez, Chihuahua | "Castillos" | ✔ | ✔ | ✔ | ✔ |
| 14 | Oscar "El Alazán del Sur" | 10 | State of Mexico | "Loco (Tu forma de ser)" | – | – | – | – |
