= La Voz Kids (Mexican TV series) =

- Genre: Reality competition
- Created by: John de Mol Jr.
- Directed by: Miguel Angel Fox; José Luis Romero
- Presented by: Yuri; Eddy Vilard
- Judges: Rosario Flores; Emmanuel; Manuel Mijares; Maluma; Melendi; Lucero; Carlos Rivera; Camilo; Belinda; Mau y Ricky; María José; Joss Favela; Paty Cantú; María León
- Narrated by: Jacqueline Bracamontes; Paola Rojas; Eddy Vilard
- Country of origin: Mexico
- Original language: Spanish
- No. of seasons: 4
- No. of episodes: 43

Production
- Executive producers: Miguel Angel Fox; José Luis Romero
- Production locations: Azteca Estudios; Mexico City (2021–)
- Production companies: Televisa (2017–2019); Talpa Media (2017–2019); TV Azteca (2021–2022); Acunmedya (2021–); ITV Studios (2021–)

Original release
- Network: Las Estrellas; Azteca Uno
- Release: March 12, 2017 – present

Related
- La Voz; La Voz Senior; The Voice Kids franchise

La Voz Kids (Spanish for The Voice Kids) is a Mexican singing competition television series for contestants aged 7 to 15 and is broadcast on Azteca Uno. The show originally premiered March 12, 2017 on Las Estrellas. It is based on The Voice franchise created by television producer John de Mol Jr. The show's rights were acquired by TV Azteca in 2020 for its third season.

== Format ==
The show consists of three phases: Blind audition, Battle phase, and Performance shows. Three judges/coaches (Four from season three and after), all noteworthy recording artists, choose teams of contestants through a blind audition process (18 members in season 1–2, 15 in season 3 and 21 in season 4).

=== First Phase – The Blind Auditions ===
Each judge has the length of the auditioner's performance (about one minute) to decide if he or she wants that singer on his or her team; if two or more judges want the same singer (as happens frequently), the singer has the final choice of coach.

=== Second Phase – The Battles ===
In this phase three artists battle against each other directly by singing the same song together, with the coach choosing which artist advances to the Performance Shows. The losing artists are automatically eliminated. In season four, a 'Save' feature was added. This new twist allowed other coaches to push their button, and the first to do so was allowed to walk backstage and welcome one of the two eliminated artists into their team.

=== Third Phase – The Performance Shows ===
In the Performance Shows, each artist competes to receive their coach's and public's vote. The artists with the highest votes from their team advance to the next round. This repeats throughout the show until the Finale, where one artist per team is voted as the Top 4. In the Finale, the highest voted artist wins the title as their country's The Voice 'Kid', along with their coach.

== Coaches and hosts ==
After five successful seasons of La Voz... México, Televisa confirmed they would also produce the kids version with Maluma, Rosario Flores and Emmanuel & Mijares as the coaches. Coach from the adult version, Yuri was host, alongside Olivia Peralta who served backstage. In September 2019, Televisa announced the official airing of the second season labeling it as ¡La ultima y nos vemós! (The last one and we'll see you!). Carlos Rivera and Lucero who both served as coaches in the adult version were confirmed as the coaches, alongside Melendi. Both hosts returned for the second season.

The third season was set to air in early 2020, but due to the COVID-19 pandemic delays, it was pushed to 2021. Filming for the third season began in October 2020 with Belinda, Mau y Ricky, María José, and Camilo being revealed as the coaches. On January 19, 2022, evening show Ventaneando announced former La Voz Ecuador coach Paty Cantú with debutants María León, Joss Favela and returning coach duo Mau y Ricky as part of the fourth season's coaching panel.

=== Coaches and hosts ===
Season	Coaches			
1	Rosario Flores	Emmanuel & Mijares	Maluma	—
2	Melendi	Lucero	Carlos Rivera	—
3	Camilo	Belinda	Mau y Ricky	Maria José
4	Joss Favela	Paty Cantú	Maria León	Mau y Ricky

Coaches

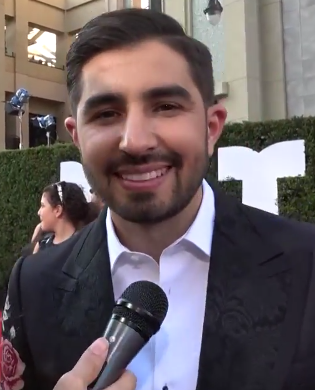
Joss Favela (2022)

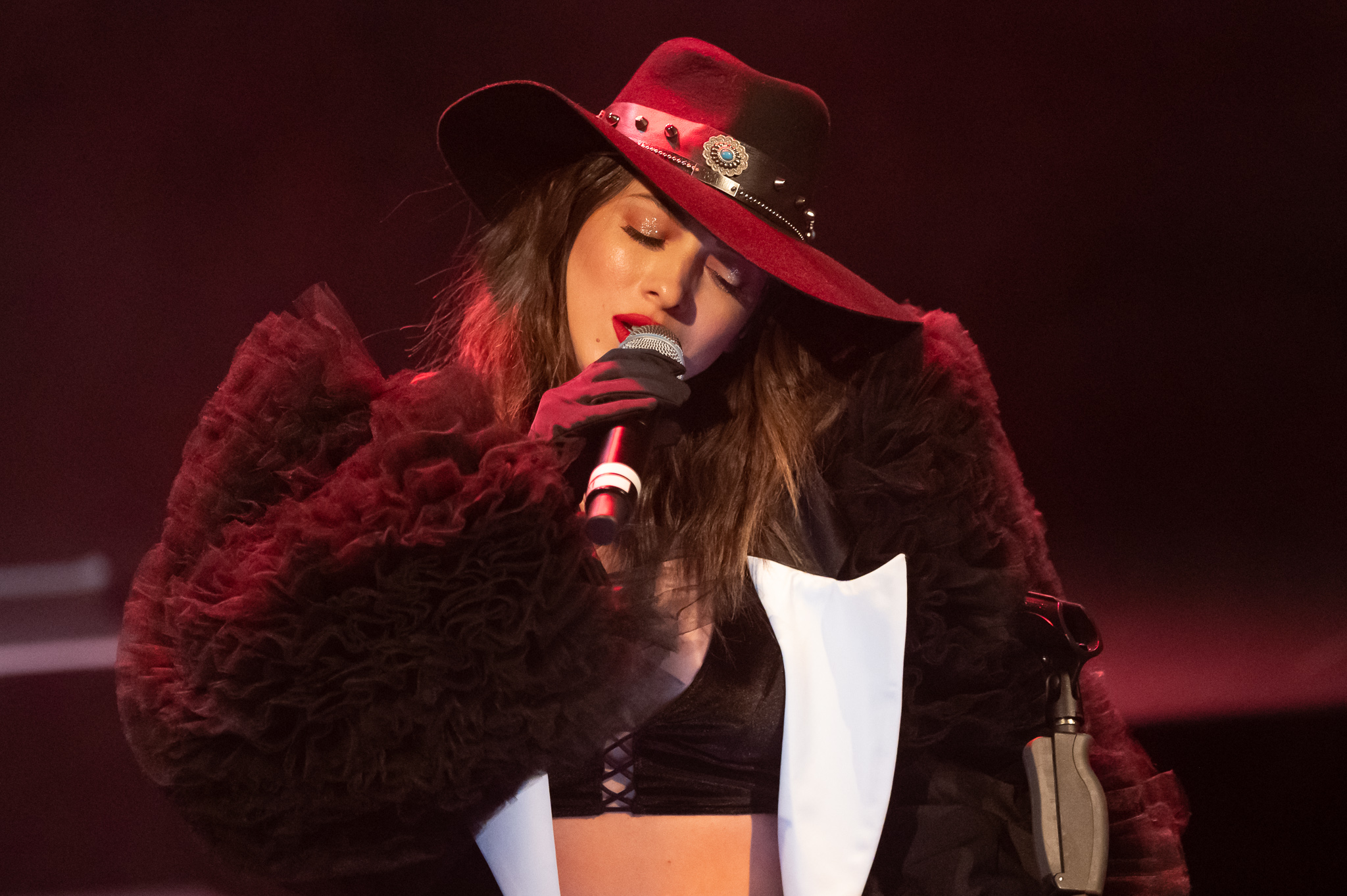
Paty Cantú (2022)

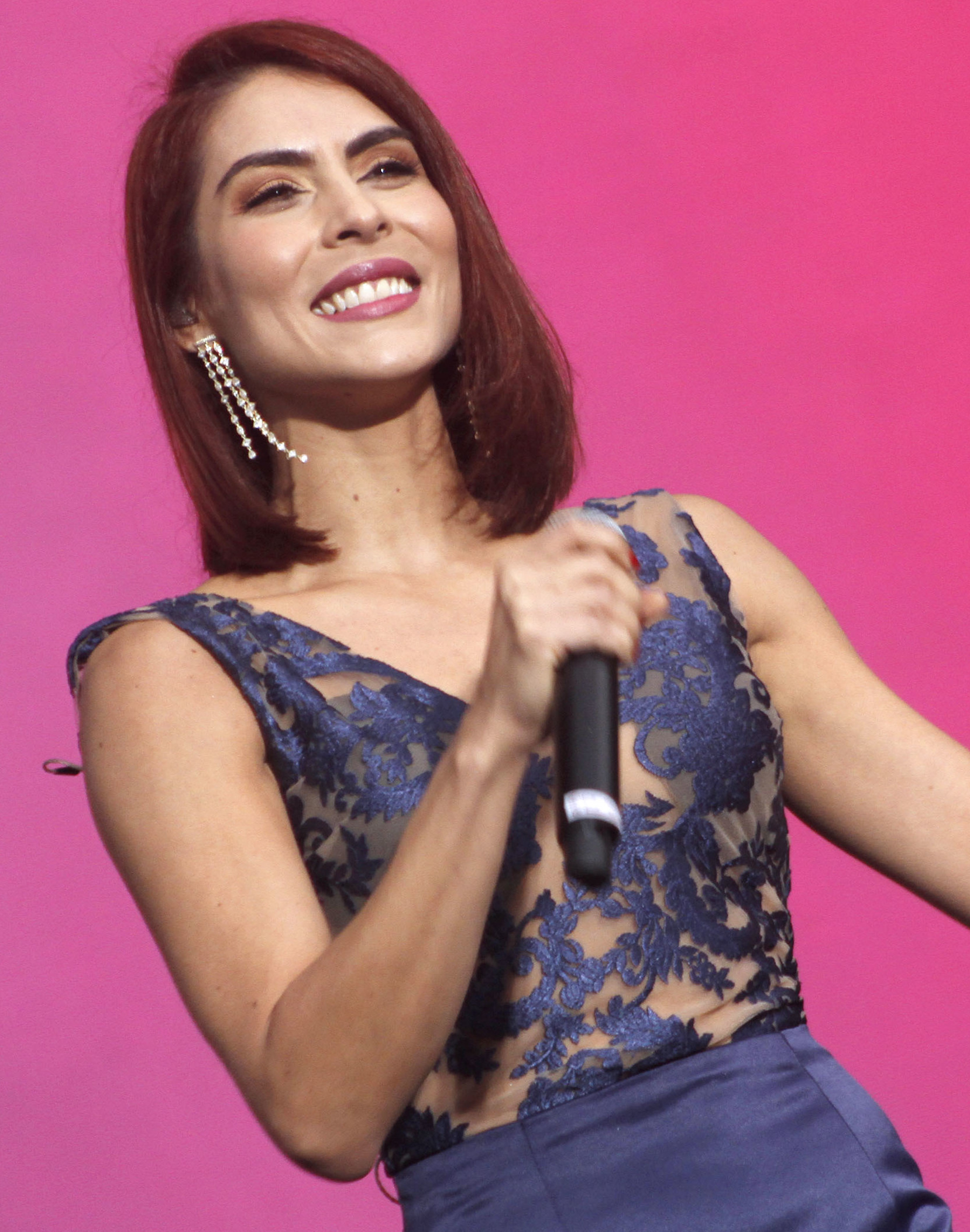
María León (2022)

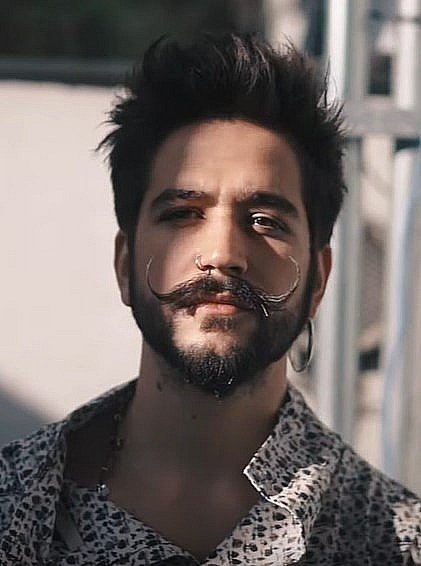
Camilo (2021)

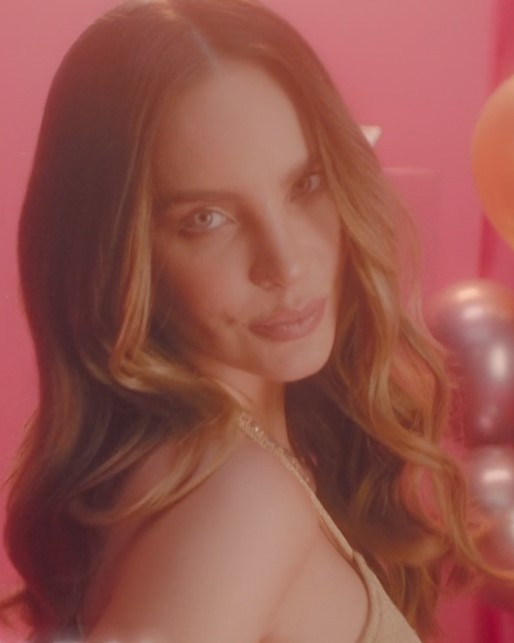
Belinda (2021)

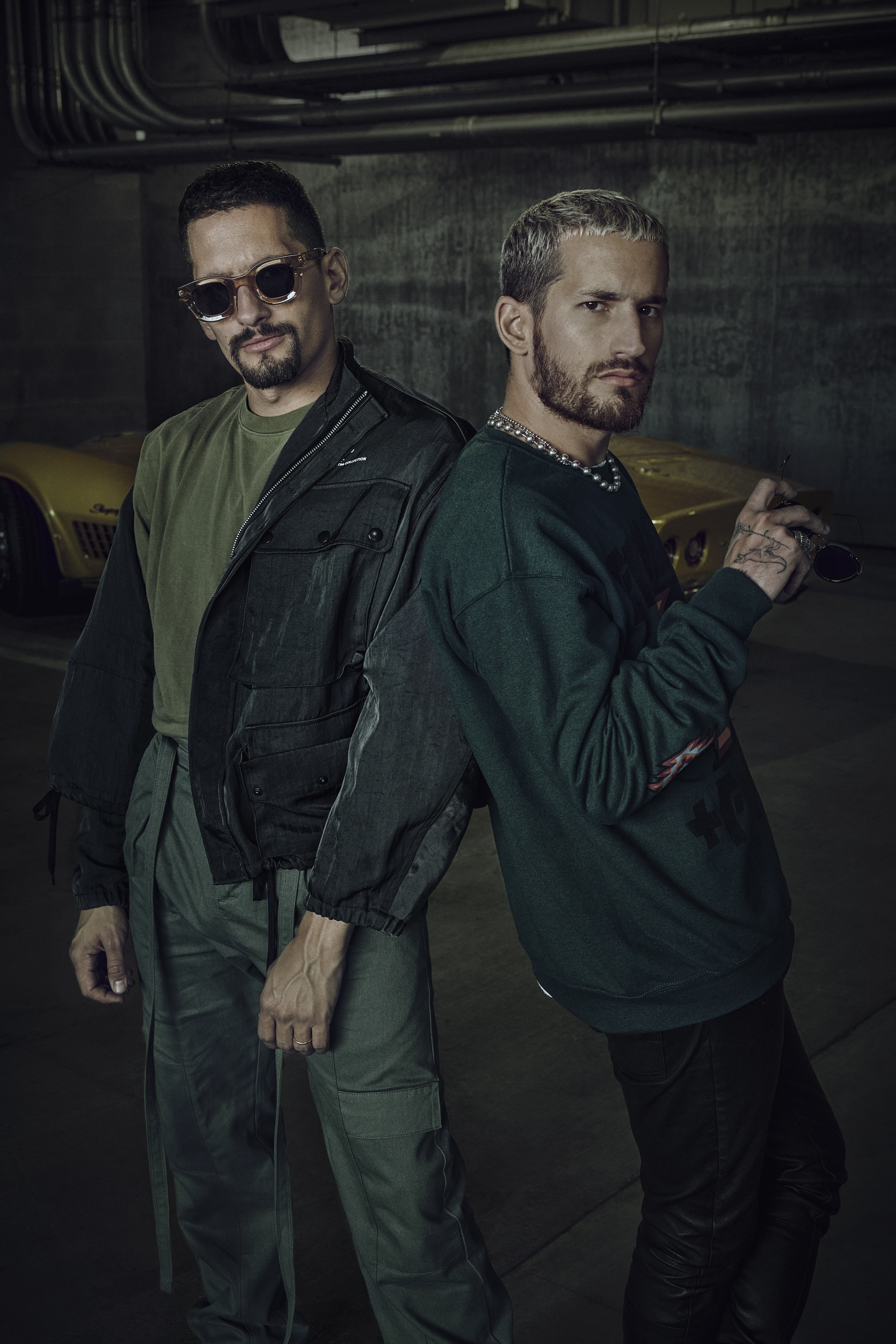
Mau y Ricky (2021–2022)

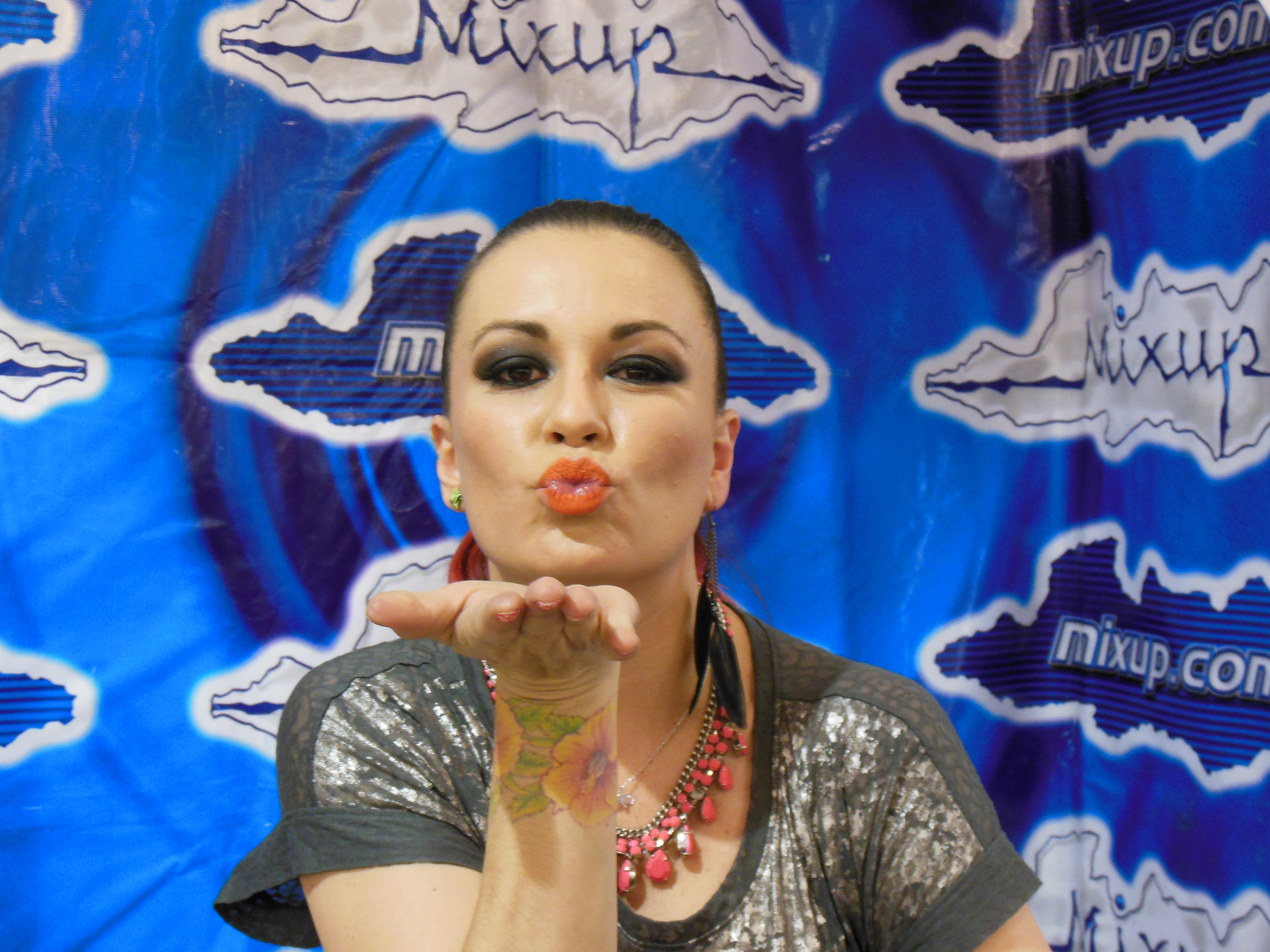
María José (2021)

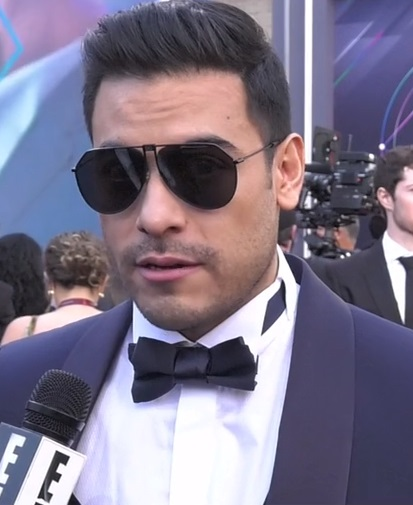
Carlos Rivera (2019)

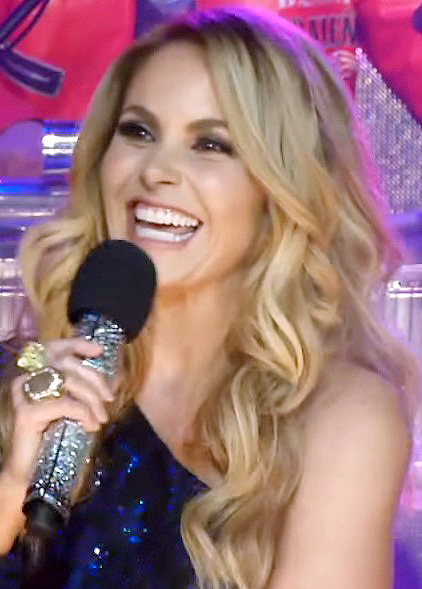
Lucero (2019)

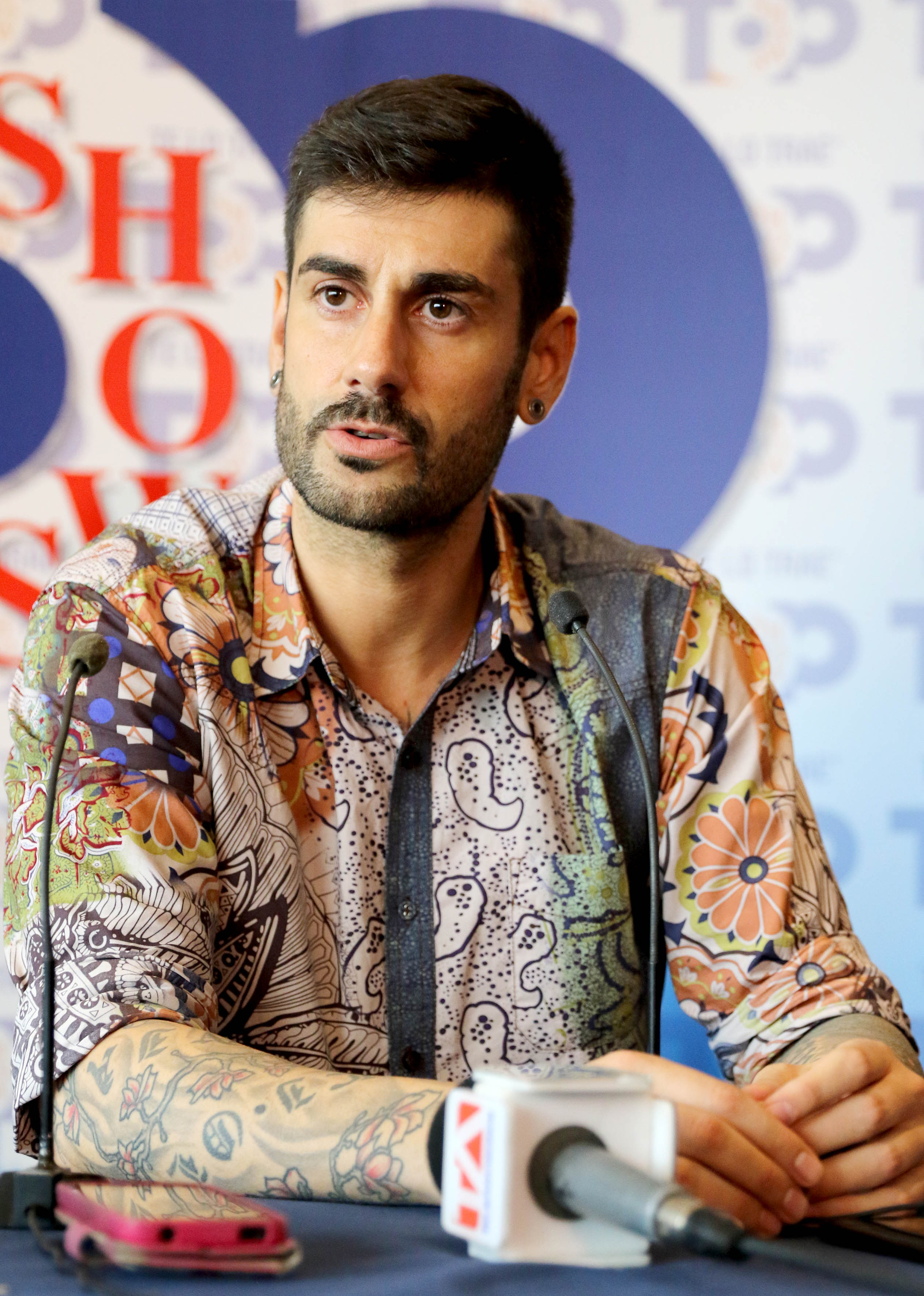
Melendi (2019)

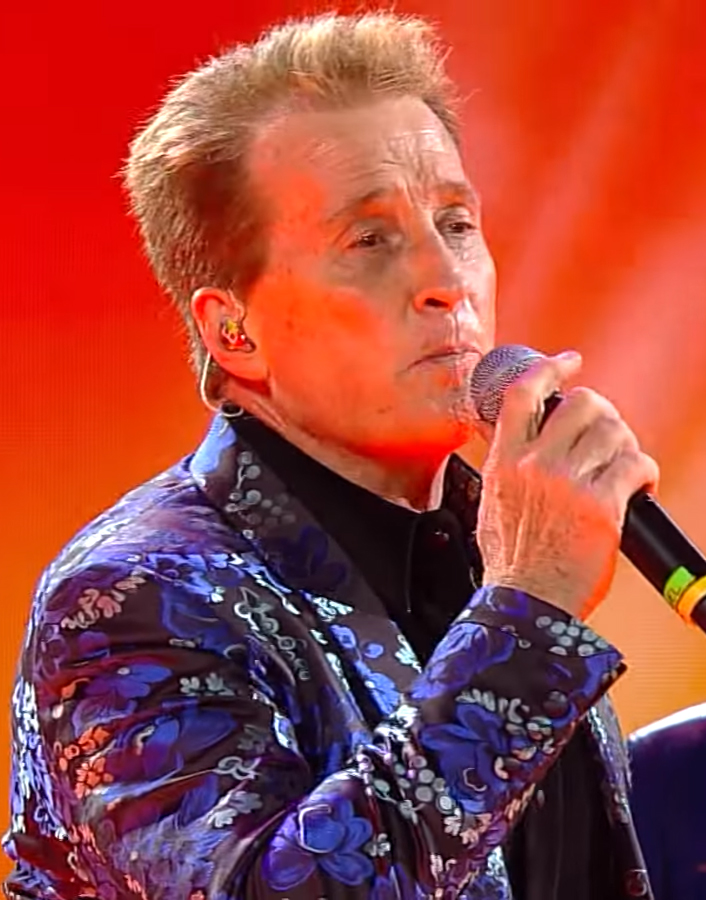
Emmanuel (2017)

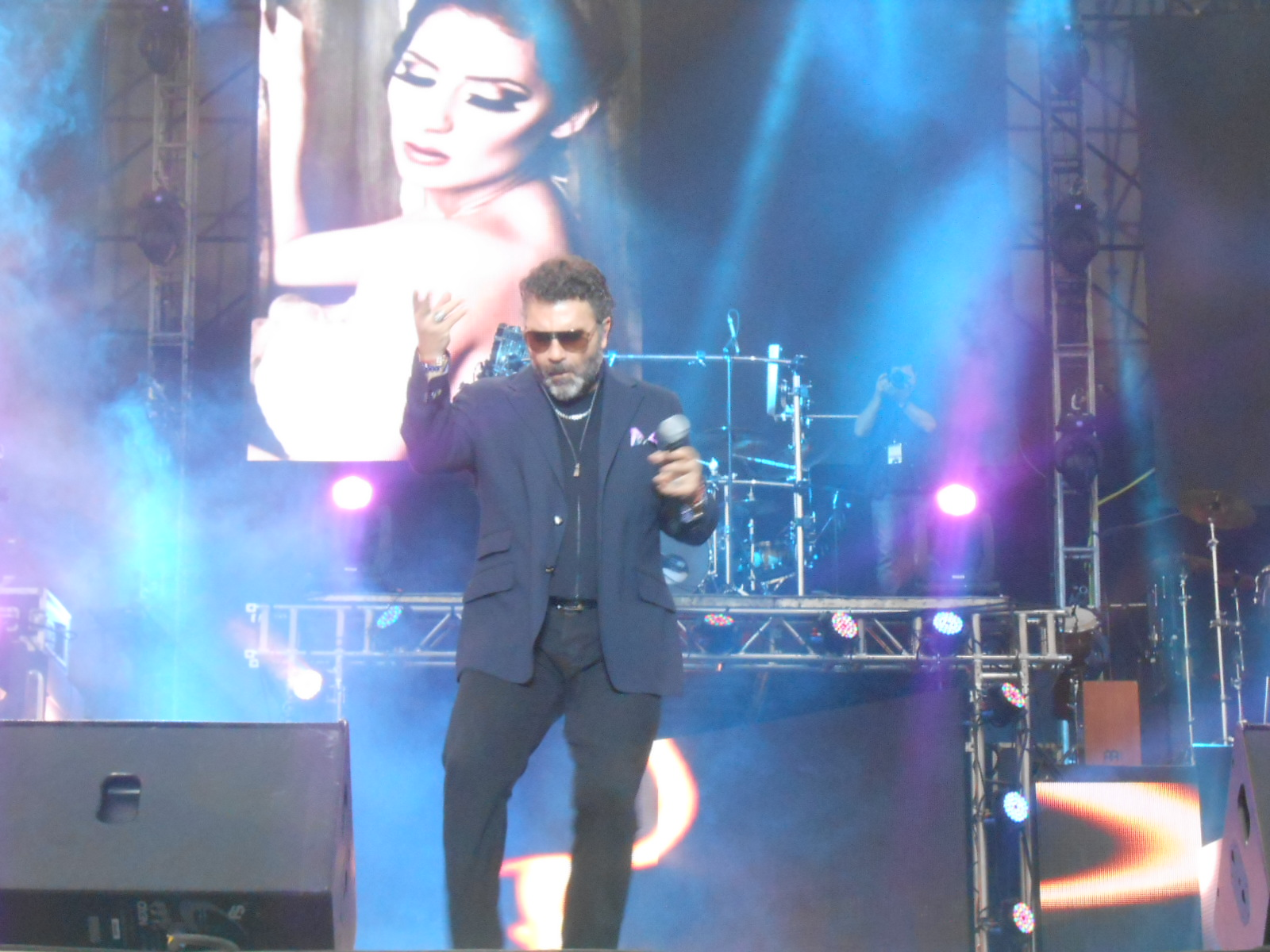
Manuel Mijares (2017)

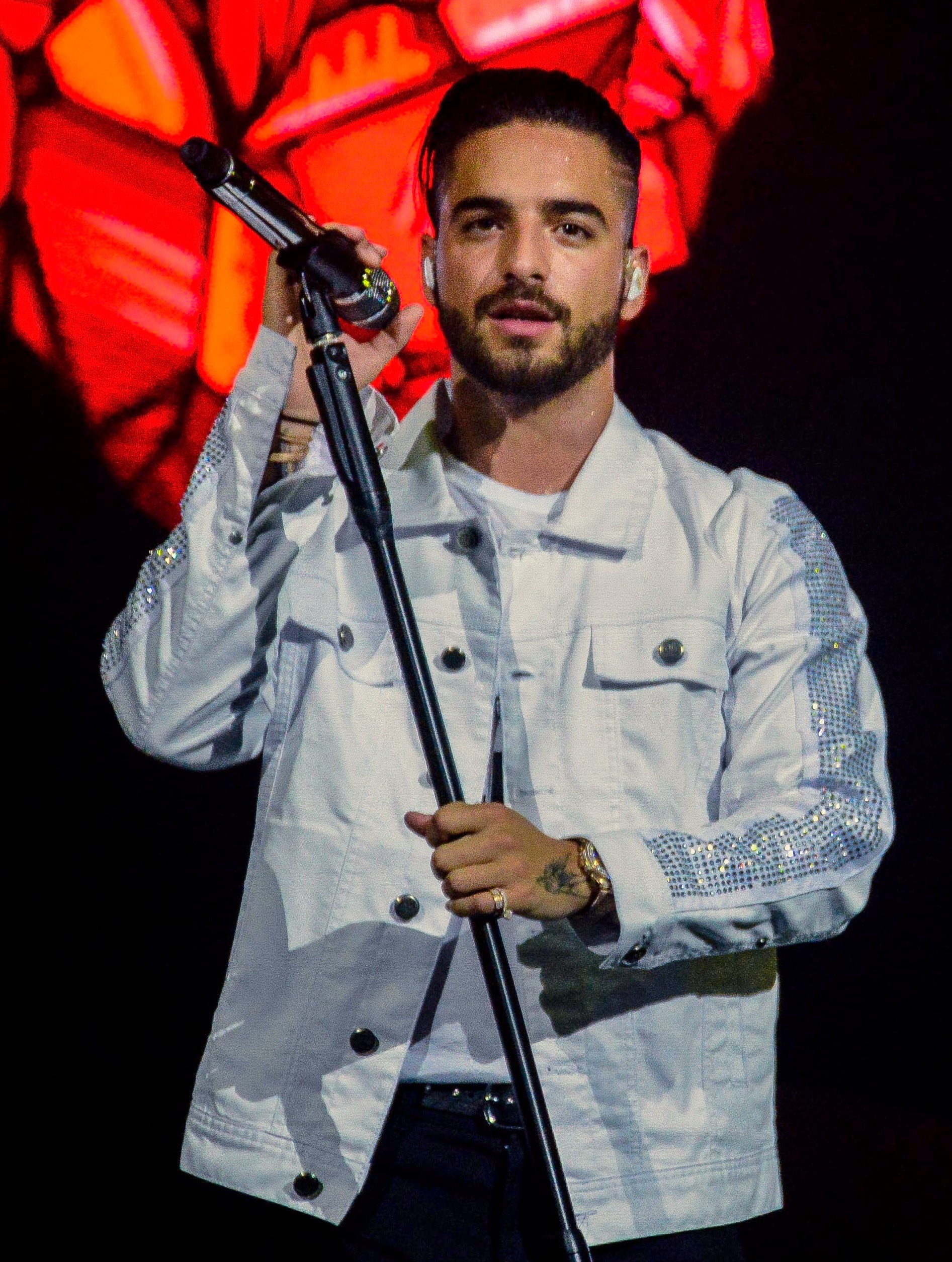
Maluma (2017)

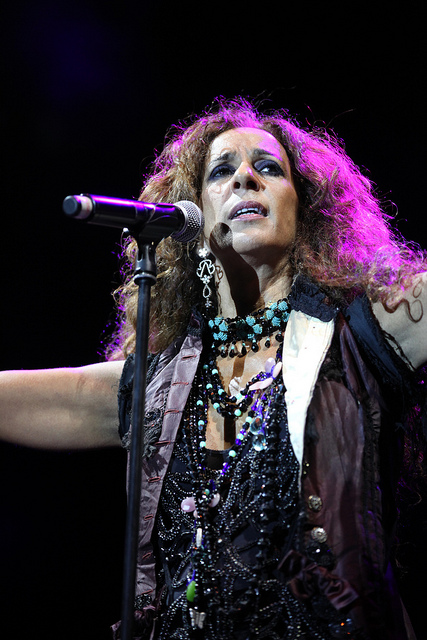
Rosario Flores (2017)

== Coaches and contestants ==
– Winning Coach/Contestant. Winners are in bold.
– Runner-Up Coach/Contestant. Final contestant first listed.
– Third Place Coach/Contestant. Final contestant first listed.
– Fourth Place Coach/Contestant. Final contestant first listed.

Saved contestants from other coaches' teams are italicized.

Season	Coaches			
1	Rosario Flores	Emmanuel & Mijares	Maluma	No Fourth Coach
1	**Deylan López**; Ildikó Lopez; Amadeus Tijerina; Saribeth Castañeda; Regina Tiscareño; Azul Renteria	**Mariana Najera**; Sara Dong; René Ojeda; Saúl Navarro; Johana Siaruqui; Roger Pascoe	**Eduardo Barba**; Leslie Mar; Ponchito Sandoval; André Real; Kymberly Chavarría; Santiago Sánchez	No Fourth Coach
2	Melendi	Lucero	Carlos Rivera	No Fourth Coach
2	**Mónica Plehn**; Nicole Florencia; Adolfo Javier; Emily del Carmen; Nadia; Valeria Victoria	**Roberto Xavier**; María José Hermosillo; Daniel Orlando; Evelyn Yuridia; Danna Lerma; Fátima Bocanegra	**Mario Girón**; Moisés Habib; Ángela Martínez; Max Cervantes; Allison Rivera Ocaña; Anya Meraz	No Fourth Coach
3	Camilo	Belinda	Mau y Ricky	María José
3	**Santiago Flores**; Alex Gricco; Luis Ángel Montes; Hannia; Óscar Patricio	**Randy Ortiz**; Mabel; Damián & Leonardo; Romina Go; Carlos Gael	**Erick Elian**; Daniel Pozo; Alexandra Marie; Jan Pablo; Valentina Guevara	**Renata Tello**; Ángel Galván; Ximena; Andrey Cabrera; Alexis Rodríguez
4	Joss Favela	Paty Cantú	María León	Mau y Ricky
4	**Leonardo Gabriel**; Harald Vera; Keyla Itzel; Santiago Pulido; Alondra Girón; Hugo Emiliano; Alondra Domínguez; Diego Salazar	**José Antonio López**; Yuneisis Mena; Constanza Navarro; Meredit Nicole; Omar Alfonso; Xóchitl Holguín; Alexander Solori; Karim Del Río	**Habana Zoé**; Ximena Rentería; Michelle Quihuis; Job Adán; Jesús Amisday; Isabela Vital; Alondra Olmos; Ian Alonso	**Kevin Aguilar**; Miguel Paredes; Suri Deneb; Ian Ariel; Carlos Paul; Anyeli Campas; Itai Santana; Ángel Santiago

== Series overview ==
Warning: the following table presents a significant amount of different colors.

La Voz Kids series overview
Season	Aired	Winner	Runner-up	Third Place	Fourth Place	Winning coach	Host	Backstge Host	Coaches (chairs' order)				Network
Season	Aired	Winner	Runner-up	Third Place	Fourth Place	Winning coach	Host	Backstge Host	1	2	3	4	Network
1	2017	Eduardo Barba	Mariana Najera	Deylan López	No fourth finalist	Maluma	Yuri	Olivia Peralta	Rosario	Emmanuel & Mijares	Maluma	No fourth coach	Las Estrellas
2	2019	Roberto Xavier	Mario Girón	Mónica Plehn	No fourth finalist	Lucero	Yuri	Olivia Peralta	Melendi	Lucero	Carlos	No fourth coach	Las Estrellas
3	2021	Randy Ortiz	Santiago Flores	Renata Tello	Erick Elian	Belinda	Eddy Vilard		Camilo	Belinda	Mau & Ricky	María José	Azteca Uno
4	2022	Kevin Aguilar	Jose A. López	Leonardo Gabriel	Habana Zoé	Mau & Ricky	Eddy Vilard		Joss	Paty	María	Mau & Ricky	Azteca Uno

== Seasons' summaries ==
=== Season 1 ===
Name	Age	Description	Musical style	Advisor
Maluma	23 years old	Urban Star	Reggaeton, Latin trap, Urban music	María León
Emmanuel & Mijares	61 and 58 years old	International Artists	Latin pop, Balada, New Wave, Pop	Julión Álvarez
Rosario Flores	52 years old	International Artist	Pop, Pop-Rock, Rumba, Flamenco	Maite Perroni

=== Season 2 ===
Name	Age	Description	Musical style	Advisor(s)
Lucero	50 years old	International Artist	Banda sinaloense, Pop, Ranchera, Baladas en español	Fanny Lu
Carlos Rivera	33 years old	International Artist	Latin pop, Balada romántica	Manuel & Julian Turizo
Melendi	40 years old	International Artist	Pop rock, Balada romántica, Pop	Natalia Jiménez

=== Season 3 ===
Name	Age	Description	Musical style
Belinda Peregrín	31 years old	International Artist	Latin pop, pop rock, dance-pop, electropop
Camilo	27 years old	Urban Star	Latin pop, Tropipop, pop
María José	45 years old	International Artist	Latin pop, pop rock, Rock, Balada romántica, soul
Mau y Ricky	27–30 years old	Urban Stars	Reggaeton, Latin pop, pop rock

=== Season 4 ===
Name	Age	Description	Musical style
Mau y Ricky	28–31 years old	Urban Stars	Reggaeton, Latin pop, pop rock
Paty Cantú	38 years old	International Artist	Latin pop, pop rock, Balada romántica, Rock
Joss Favela	31 years old	Regional Artist	Banda sinaloense, Ranchera
María León	35 years old	National Artist	Latin pop, pop, pop rock, Reggaeton
