= Inténtalo =

Studio album by 3Ball MTY
- Released: 6 December 2011
- Recorded: 2011
- Genre: Tribal guarachero
- Length: 44:29
- Label: Fonovisa, Universal Music
- Producer: Toy Selectah, Jose Serrano Montoya

3Ball MTY chronology
Inténtalo (2011)	Globall (2014)

Singles from Inténtalo
- 1. "Inténtalo" Released: August 1, 2011; 2. "Besos al Aire" Released: March 8, 2012

Inténtalo is the debut studio album by Mexican group 3Ball MTY. It was released on December 6, 2011 under Fonovisa Records label.

== Reception ==
=== Commercial performance ===
Inténtalo became a commercial success for the trio. It debuted at No.2 on the Latin Albums chart the week ending 31 December 2011. The same week, it debuted atop the Regional Mexican Albums chart. The album also appeared on the Billboard 200 at No.126 and on the Mexican Albums Chart at No.84.

=== Critical response ===
Professional ratings
Review scores
Source	Rating
Allmusic	4/5 stars

David Jeffries from Allmusic gave a positive review of the album, and awarded it four stars out of five. On his review, he stated that "start with the outstanding title track for a taste and rest assured, the rest of the album is that good, and sometimes even better."

Jon Caramanica from The New York Times called Inténtalo "an album like none of the others" and commented that its music is "as nimble as ever, and as fleet, with chilling drums, winding samples, a robust sense of history and a keen urge to destroy and update it." The album earned the Lo Nuestro Award for Regional Mexican Album of the Year.

== Track listing ==
=== Inténtalo ===
1. "Inténtalo" (featuring América Sierra & El Bebeto) — 3:13
2. "Baile de Amor" (featuring Favela) — 3:10
3. "Solos Tú y Yo" (featuring Smoky) — 3:02
4. "Tipsy" (featuring Milkman) — 3:23
5. "Ritmo Alterado" — 3:39
6. "Mala Mujer" (featuring Horacio Palencia & Smoky) — 3:33
7. "Amantes Guaracheros" — 3:22
8. "Ese Ritmo" (Con Sabor) — 3:43
9. "Tu Carita" (featuring Morenito de Fuego) — 3:38
10. "Te Digo Bye Bye" (featuring Smoky) — 3:03
11. "Besos al Aire" (featuring America Sierra & Smoky) — 3:48
12. "Todos a Bailar" — 3:46
13. "Tribal Guarachoso" — 3:09

== Inténtalo (Deluxe Edition) ==
1. "Hipsters Con Botas" — 3:17
2. "Inténtalo" (feat. América Sierra & El Bebeto) [Mijangos Remix] — 6:40
3. "Inténtalo" (feat. América Sierra & El Bebeto) [Dj Münki Remix] — 5:12

== Personnel ==
- Oscar Botello - Composer
- Alberto Del Castillo - A&R
- Andrea Galván - Stylist
- Toy Hernández - A&R
- José Alberto Inzunza - Composer
- Antonio Hernández Luna - Composer
- Luciano Luna - Composer
- Aaron "La Pantera" - Martínez Bajo Quinto
- Milkman Botello - Stylist
- Jose Serrano Montoya - Executive Producer
- Horacio Palencia - Composer
- Jorge Alberto Presenda - Composer
- Erick Rincon - Composer
- Guillermo Serrano - A&R
- América Sierra - Composer
- Jesús Antonio Torres - Composer
- Alán Tovar - Composer
- Toy Selectah - Producer
- Sergio Zavala - Composer

Source:Allmusic

== Charts ==
=== Weekly charts ===
Chart (2011–2012)	Peak position
Mexican Albums (AMPROFON)	84
US Billboard 200	126
US Top Latin Albums (Billboard)	2
US Regional Mexican Albums (Billboard)	1

=== Year-end charts ===
Chart (2012)	Position
US Top Latin Albums (Billboard)	3

=== Decade-end charts ===
Chart (2010–2019)	Position
US Hot Latin Songs (Billboard)	38

== Certifications ==
Region	Certification	Certified units/sales
Mexico (AMPROFON)	Gold	30,000^{^}
^{^} Shipments figures based on certification alone.

== Release history ==
Country	Date	Format(s)	Label
United States	6 December 2011	CD, Digital download	Fonovisa
Mexico	6 December 2011	CD, Digital download	Fonovisa
