= Me Gustas Tanto =

2011 single by Paulina Rubio

Single by Paulina Rubio

from the album Brava!
- Released: September 6, 2011
- Recorded: 2011
- Genre: Latin pop; dance pop
- Length: 3:45
- Label: Universal Latino
- Songwriters: Paulina Rubio; Nacho; Andrés Recio
- Producer: RedOne

Paulina Rubio singles chronology
"Golpes en el Corazón" (2011)	"Me Gustas Tanto" (2011)	"Me voy" (2012)

Music video
- "Me Gustas Tanto" on YouTube

"Me Gustas Tanto" (English: "I Like You So Much") is a song recorded by Mexican singer Paulina Rubio for her tenth studio album, Brava! (2011). It was released by Universal Latino as the lead single from the album on September 2, 2011. The track was written by Rubio, Nacho and Andrés Recio, whilst production was handled by RedOne.

Musically, "Me Gustas Tanto"" is a dance-pop song with Latin rhythm that is known for its "oe oe eo" hook, the lyrical content focuses on express how much you like someone. Upon its release, the song received mixed reviews from contemporary music critics. Commercially, it was a successful in some regions such as United States, Mexico, Spain and Colombia. It managed to reach the top spot on the US Billboard Hot Latin Songs chart, becoming as her fifth number one song on the chart. The song was nominated for Pop Song of the Year at the Premio Lo Nuestro 2013.

An accompanying music video was directed by Gustavo Lopez Mañas in Little River Studios in Miami, Florida; it featured Rubio dancing, and wearing different costumes. To promote the single, Rubio performed the track at the Premios TVyNovelas 2012, and Premios Telehit 2013, and appeared on the setlist for Rubio's Brava! concert tour.

== Background ==
"Me Gustas Tanto" was written by Rubio herself along with Nacho, from the Venezuelan due Chino & Nacho, and Andrés Recio, and it was produced by RedOne, the man responsible for huge hits of Lady Gaga, Enrique Iglesias, Jennifer Lopez, Pitbull and others. The single has been described as a fresh song with simple lyrics and a catchy beat. It is a dance-pop song with a Latin rhythm touch, and it clearly uses an electronic sound with a pulsating repeat of "OE OE EO!" chorus. Italian platform Notizie Musica describes it as an "unbearably captivating" song that "finds its way between Latin rhythms and purely Latin vocal influences".

== Release ==
Paulina confirmed the release of the single via Twitter saying "I want to be the first one to let you know my NEW single hits radio Sept 13th." While she didn't indicate the genre of the new song, her statement suggested the song might be a dance track. "Are you ready to dance?" Rubio, additionally, did not indicate if the single will be released in both English and Spanish. But her statement to news announcing the track was given in both languages. According to LALATE, a celebrity news site narrowing on Rubio's career, the single, "Me Gustas Tanto" made its debut September 2, 2011 on the same site. The single is available for purchase on Amazon.com and ITunes starting on September 6, 2011, about a week before it was released as a digital single worldwide and sent to radio station globally.

== Music video ==
The music video was directed by Gustavo Lopez Mañas, and was filmed on at Little River Studios in Miami, Florida; in late September 2011, described the first day of shooting the video as "a looong productive, fashionable, exciting, happy, explosive and well worth day!" Rubio got involved in the editing and montage of the music video. It premiered on October 27 on her VEVO channel, on YouTube.

The CromosomaX gay website was very rigorous with the reception of the video and compared some of Rubio's looks with the latest works of the English singer Alison Goldfrapp.

== Chart performance ==
The song debuted at #15 on the Spanish Promusicae Top 50 Songs as the major entry to the list. The song peaked at #4 on the Spanish Promusicae Top 50 Songs. It eventually peaked #1 on the Spanish Airplay Chart. In the US the song has picked up some steam with local radio stations playing the song more, and now it has become Rubio's fifth number-one song on the Billboard Hot Latin Songs component chart and her last #1 to date. The song also moved up from #6 to #2 on the Latin Pop Songs. In Mexico the song peaked at #4. The song also made a huge jump to #1 in Puerto Rico.

== Track listing and formats ==
- CD and Digital Single
1. "Me Gustas Tanto" – 3:42
- Mexican Remixes—Enhanced
1. "Me Gustas Tanto" (Vein Electro) – 2:56
2. "Me Gustas Tanto" (Urban Remix) – 4:32
3. "Me Gustas Tanto" (3Ball) – 3:49
4. "Me Gustas Tanto" Behind the Scenes (Video) – 3:52
- Argentinian Remixes
1. "Me Gustas Tanto" (Disco Remix) Feat. Ez Vargas – 5:27
2. "Me Gustas Tanto" (Urban Dance Remix) Feat. Franco "El Gorila" – 4:49
3. "Me Gustas Tanto" (Electro Hopp Remix) Feat. Gocho – 2:56
4. "Me Gustas Tanto" – 3:42

== Charts ==
=== Weekly charts ===
Chart (2011–2012)	Peak position
Colombia (National-Report)	5
Honduras (Honduras Top 50)	29
Mexico (Monitor Latino)	10
Mexico (Billboard Mexican Airplay)	12
Mexico (Billboard Espanol Airplay)	5
Spain (Promusicae)	4
Spain Digital Song Sales (Billboard)	4
US Hot Latin Songs (Billboard)	1
US Latin Pop Airplay (Billboard)	2
US Tropical Airplay (Billboard)	3
US Latin Pop Digital Songs Sales (Billboard)	9
Venezuela (Record Report)	35

=== Year-end charts ===
Chart (2012)	Position
US Latin Songs Year End 2012	44
US Latin Pop Songs Year End 2012	35

== See also ==
- List of Billboard number-one Latin songs of 2012
