= Me voy (Paulina Rubio song) =

"Me Voy"

Single by Paulina Rubio

from the album Brava! and Bravísima!
- Released: February 14, 2012
- Recorded: 2011
- Genre: Latin pop · mariachi
- Length: 2:46
- Label: Universal
- Songwriters: Paulina Rubio, Espinoza Paz & Marcela De La Garza
- Producer: Casadiego

Paulina Rubio singles chronology
"Me Gustas Tanto" (2011)	"Me Voy" (2012)	"Boys Will Be Boys" (2012)

Music video
- "Me Voy" ft. Espinoza Paz on YouTube

"Me Voy" (English: I'm Leaving) is a song performed by Mexican singer Paulina Rubio. The song was recorded for her tenth studio album, Brava! and was released as the album's second official single in Latin America on February 14, 2012.

A slightly reworked version featuring Paz was released as the standard radio version and was later released on the Mexican edition of Rubio's EP, Bravísima!

== Background ==
The song was composed by Paulina herself, Espinoza Paz and Marcela De La Garza.

== Release ==
The song was officially released on February 14, 2012.

== Promotion ==
Paulina and Espinoza performed the song during Premios Lo Nuestro for the first televised performance of the song. She surprised Espinoza's fans during one of his concerts by appearing on stage and performing the song together for the first time ever. The song is also included in the soundtrack for Univision's soap opera, "El Talismán".

== Music video ==
The video for the song was shot in Mexico Cityin the penthouse of a beautiful, 30s-era, French-style building. It included a special cameo from singer-songwriter Espinoza Paz. It was released on March 20, 2012 and was directed by Paula Falla. The video's director commented on the video: “If you listen closely, it’s actually a sad song, so we wanted to convey this idea that you can suffer from love, but you’ll find a new one and everything will be OK.” Adds Falla: “We also wanted to show that men suffer the same way that women do from a broken heart, that’s why I wanted to do it as two different love stories happening at the same time. They’re [Espinoza and Paulina] two totally different artists, one’s more pop and the other more [regional] Mexican, so I like the idea of two different people suffering from the same thing. But in the end, new people always come into your life.” Falla sums up the video's message in one phrase: “No one is going to die from a broken heart.”

The Colombian video director says the idea to include that bit at the end was actually Rubio's idea. “She thought it would be fun and people are liking it. I’ve been reading all the tweets.” As seen at the end of the video, Rubio and the model Pedro Yuri who participated in the video, staying in character for a little too long after the crew has yelled “Cut!”

According to the music site Jenesaispop, in this music video Rubio "is much more formal than the visual ravings to which we are accustomed."

== Remixes ==
- Me voy (Remix featuring Espinoza Paz)

== Charts ==
Chart (2012)	Peak position
Mexico (Billboard Mexican Airplay)	33
Mexico (Billboard Espanol Airplay)	15
US Latin Digital Songs (Billboard)	29
