= Tribal guarachero =

Music genre

- Other names: Tribal, 3ball, trival, guaracha
- Stylistic origins: Mexican folk, cumbia, techno, electro house, club music
- Cultural origins: Early 2000s in Latin America (mainly Mexico), heavily Latino/Hispanic populated regions of the United States
- Typical instruments: Synthesizer, congas, güira, flute

Tribal guarachero, also known as tribal, is a music genre that fuses electronic dance music with cumbia or certain rhythms from regional Mexican music genres.

Tribal guarachero is sometimes referred to as "3ball". Despite the similarity between the letter "b" and "v" in Spanish, it should not be confused with tribal house or tecnocumbia music.

== History ==
The style originated from the lower and middle-class neighborhoods of Mexico City in 2000 and 2001. It then moved to Monterrey, Nuevo León, in 2007, before expanding to the United States in 2008. The genre's popularity peaked in Mexico and in parts of the United States with large Mexican and Mexican-American populations in the early 2010s. One of the precursors and most popular of tribal guarachero producers is 3Ball MTY from Monterrey.

== Characteristics ==
Tribal guarachero music is a fusion of genres such as regional Mexican music, including technobanda, and EDM genres such as techno, electro house and club music. With a 4/4 time signature, the genre is often made up of cascading triplets and a BPM of 140 to 280. The rhythm employs Afro-Cuban rhythms and Latin synths.

During the 2010s and 2020s the style became popular in Colombia with emerging DJs and musicians like Victor Cardenas, Deyvi, DJ Travesura and others. Some reggaetoneros mixed the style and created very popular songs like Farruko's "Pepas".

== Usage ==
As a dance and EDM music style, tribal guarachero music can be used in solo dances with a unique dance movement, or in dance troupes to compete in danceoffs. Mexican pointy boots are often associated with tribal guarachero music and are worn in these danceoffs.

== See also ==
- List of Mexican tribal guarachero artists and bands
- Séga
