= 3Ball MTY =

Mexican DJ trio

3BallMTY
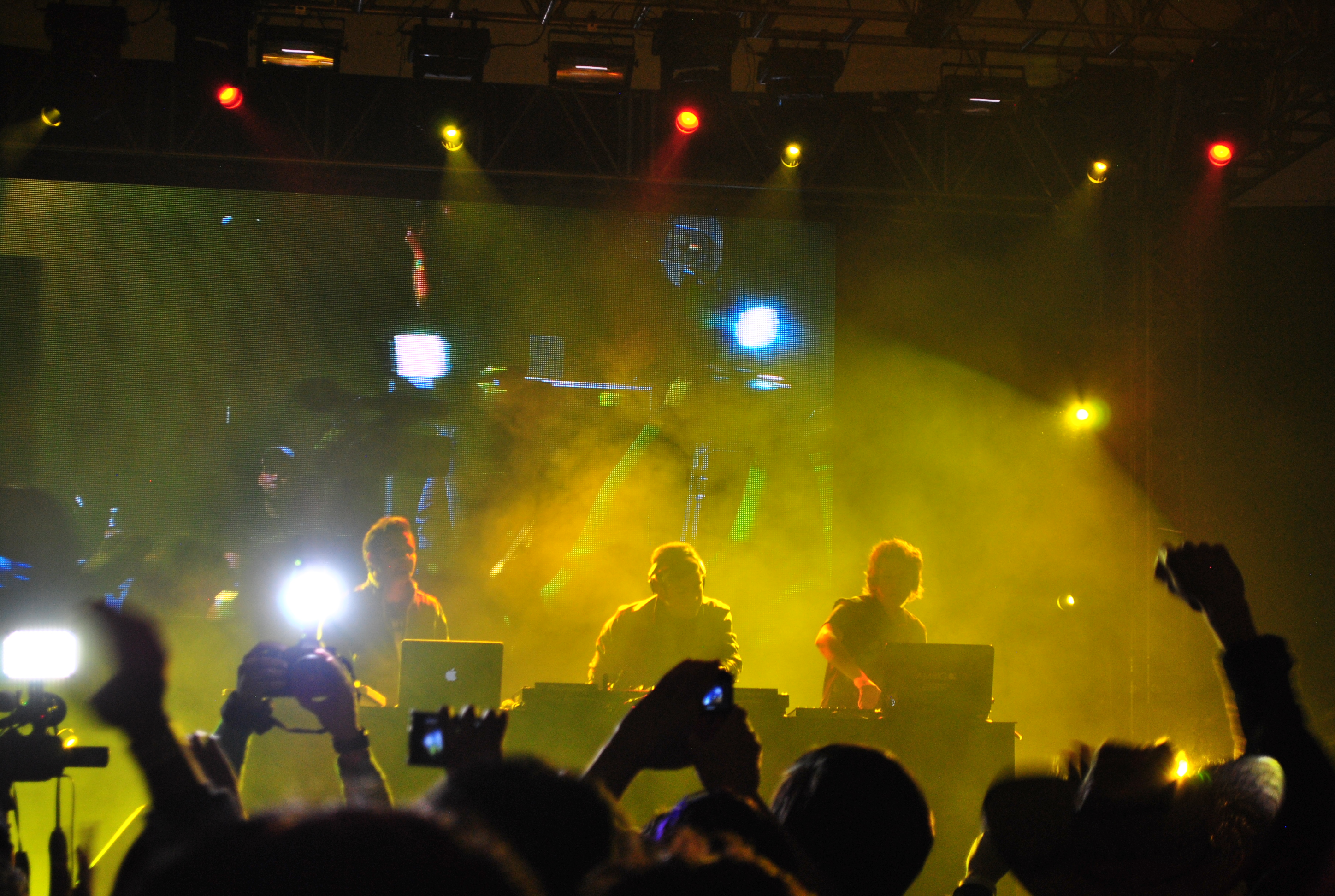
- 3BallMTY live at Mexico City.

Background information
- Also known as: Tribal Monterrey
- Origin: Monterrey, Mexico
- Genres: Tribal guarachero; EDM; Latin house
- Years active: 2009–present
- Labels: Universal Music; Latin Power Music; Penca Records
- Members: Sergio Zavala; Alberto Presenda
- Past members: Erick Rincon
- Website: www.3ballmty.com.mx

3BallMTY (pronounced "Tribal Monterrey") is a Mexican pop DJ group from the city of Monterrey, Nuevo León, Mexico. The "DJ Collective" (the name its members have formally given themselves) was formed in 2009 by two teenage DJs – Sergio Zavala (DJ Sheeqo Beat), and Alberto Presenda (DJ Otto). The name "3Ball" comes from the Spanish word "tribal", which refers to the culture of guaracha tribal music popular in many Spanish-speaking countries around the world.

== History ==
=== 2009: Formation of 3BallMTY ===
In August 2009, teenage Monterrey disc jockey Erick Rincon joined up with fellow DJs Sergio Zavala and Alberto Presenda. Perfectly suited to their synthy, techno-inspired sound, the three DJs connected through the internet. The trio had a vision of combining two fundamental facets of the music industry – production and performance. Rincon has cited that between 2009 and 2010, the group became known as 3BallMTY, and set out to lay a new foundation for "latino electronica", which 3Ball has introduced that year.

In December 2010, they were invited to the Worldtronics festival being held in Germany. It was the first time the group traveled outside Mexico. In 2011, the group signed a record contract with label Latin Power Music, a division of Universal Music. On December 6, they released their debut album, Intentalo, which features collaborations with artists such as Smoky, America Sierra, El Bebeto, Morenito, Favela, Milkman and Horacio Palencia.

=== 2010–2013: Intentalo, Latin Music Awards, touring ===
3Ball MTY rose to prominence in 2012 when their single "Inténtalo", taken from their first studio album of the same name, featuring El Bebeto and America Sierra, reached No.1 on the Billboard Latin Songs chart for two non-consecutive weeks. The song was performed live by the group at the 2012 ceremony of the Billboard Latin Music Awards.

On February 4, 2012, they began their first tour of Mexico.

On October 18, 2012, 3Ball MTY and Gerardo Ortiz dominated the Billboard Mexican Music Awards. At the second annual music awards, 3Ball MTY received 9 awards, with some of those including New Artist of the Year, Artist of the Year, Duo or Group, Song Artist of the Year and Digital Download Artist of the Year.

On November 15, 2012, 3Ball MTY won the Latin Grammy Award for Best New Artist.

In 2013, they released a new single "Quiero Bailar (All Through the Night)" featuring Becky G. It premiered on September 10, 2013 on Univision. It is featured on the PlayStation 4 and Xbox One versions of Need for Speed Rivals.

=== 2014–2015: Globall, and touring ===
On March 24, 2014, 3Ball MTY released their second studio album "Globall" with various artist on the albums; such as Belinda, Far East Movement, Becky G, Gerardo Ortiz, Cowboy Troy, Las Cumbia Girls, and Jotdog.

=== 2016–2017: Erick Rincon's departure, "Bailar Contigo" single ===
On July 5, 2016, it was announced by both members that Erick Rincon decided to leave the group to venture off on individual projects. It was also revealed that he was struggling in keeping up with both individual projects and group projects. That same year, the group released the single "Bailar Contigo" featuring Chyno Miranda and El Jova, and took part in several concert performances.

=== 2018–2019: Various singles and collaborations, touring ===
On November 2, 2018, 3BallMTY released the single "Tequila" featuring Chayin Rubio.

On March 14–15, 2019, 3BallMTY attended the SXSW 2019 in Austin, Texas, alongside Voz de Mando, Vanessa Zamora, and Agrupacion Carino.

=== 2020–present: "Ferrari" single, SOMOS, other projects ===
During the month of January, "Intentalo" was on Billboard's top 100 placing at 38. On January 29, 2020, 3BallMTY released the single "Ferrari" featuring Morenito de Fuego. The following month, 3BallMTY released their third studio album SOMOS with promotions after the release date.

== Members ==
Current Members:

- Alberto Presenda (DJ Otto) — Born on November 5, 1992, Cunduacán, Mexico (Age 33)
- Sergio Zavala (DJ Sheeqo) — Born on March 7, 1992, Monterrey, Mexico (Age 34)

Former Members:

- Erick Rincon — Born on August 17, 1993, Monterrey, Mexico (Age 33)

== Discography ==
=== Albums ===
List of Studio albums, with selected details, chart positions
Title	Album details	Peak chart positions		
Title	Album details	MEX	US	US Latin
Inténtalo	Released: December 6, 2011; Labels: Universal Music; Latin Power Music; Penca Records; Format: digital download; Inténtalo (Deluxe Edition)	1	126	2
Globall	Released: April 8, 2014; Labels: Universal Music; Latin Power Music; Penca Records; Format: digital download	1	—	4
Somos	Released: February 21, 2020; Labels: Universal Music; Latin Power Music; Penca Records; Format: digital download	—	—	—

=== Singles ===
List of singles as lead artist, with selected chart positions and certifications, showing year released and album name
Title	Year	Peak chart positions			Album
Title	Year	US Latin	US Latin Pop	US Latin Digital	Album
"Inténtalo" (featuring El Bebeto and America Sierra)	2011	1	11	3	Inténtalo
"Besos al Airé" (featuring America Sierra and Smoky)	2012	— (Note: "Besos al Airé" did not chart on the Billboard Latin Songs, though did peak at number 46 on the Latin Airplay charts.)	—	22	Inténtalo
"Quiero Bailar (All Though the Night)" (featuring Becky G)	2013	—	34	—	Globall
"La Noche Es Tuya" (featuring Gerardo Ortiz and America Sierra)	2014	—	—	—	Globall
"De las 12 a las 12" (featuring El Bebeto)	2014	—	—	—	Globall
"Bailar Contigo" (feat. Chyno Miranda & El Jova)	2017	—	—	—	Non-album singles
"Tequila" (featuring Chayin Miranda)	2018	—	—	—	Non-album singles
"Quisiera Tenerte" (featuring Chayin Rubio and Lucky Bossi)	2019	—	—	—	Non-album singles
"Ladron" (featuring Shaira and ATL)	2019	—	—	—	Non-album singles
"Bubbly" (Remix)	2019	—	—	—	Non-album singles
"Ferrari"	2020	—	—	—	Non-album singles

=== Remixes ===
- 2012: Steve Aoki & Angger Dimas & Dimitri Vegas & Like Mike - Phat Brahms (3Ball MTY Remix)

== Videography ==
Title	Year	Featured	Album
"Intentalo"	2011	America Sierra	Intentalo
"Besos Al Aire"	2012	America Sierra	Intentalo
"Baile De Amor"	2012		Intentalo
"Tribal Guarachero"	2012		Intentalo
"Quiero Bailar"	2014	Becky G	Globall
"La Noche Es Tuya"	2014	America Sierra	Globall
"OBDC"	2014	Las Cumbia Girls	Globall
"De Las 12 A Las 12"	2014	El Bebeto	Globall
"Bailar Contigo"	2017	Chyno Miranda	
"Tequila"	2018	Chayin Rubio	
"Quisiera Tenerte"	2019	Chayin Rubio, Lucky Bossi	
"Ladrona"	2019	Shaira, ATL	

== Awards and nominations ==
=== Premios Juventud (2012) ===
Year	Category	Song	Results
2012	La Más Pegajosa (Catchiest Tune)	"Inténtalo"	Nominated
2012	Mi Ringtone Favorito (My Ringtone)	"Inténtalo"	Nominated

=== Premios Billboard de la Música Regional Mexicana (2012) ===
Year	Category	Song, Album, Group	Result
2012	Artista del Año, Debut	3BallMTY	Won
2012	Artista del Año, Dúo o Grupo	3BallMTY	Won
2012	Tema del Año	"Inténtalo" (with America Sierra y El Bebeto)	Won
2012	Tema del Año, Colaboración Vocal	"Inténtalo" (with America Sierra y El Bebeto)	Won
2012	Artista del Año, Temas	3BallMTY	Won
2012	Artista del Año, Descarga Digital	3BallMTY	Won
2012	Song of the Year Duranguense/Grupero/Cumbia	"Inténtalo" (with America Sierra y El Bebeto)	Won
2012	Album of the Year Duranguense/Grupero/Cumbia	Inténtalo	Won
2012	Artist of the Year Duranguense/Grupero/Cumbia	3BallMTY	Won
