= Raymix discography =

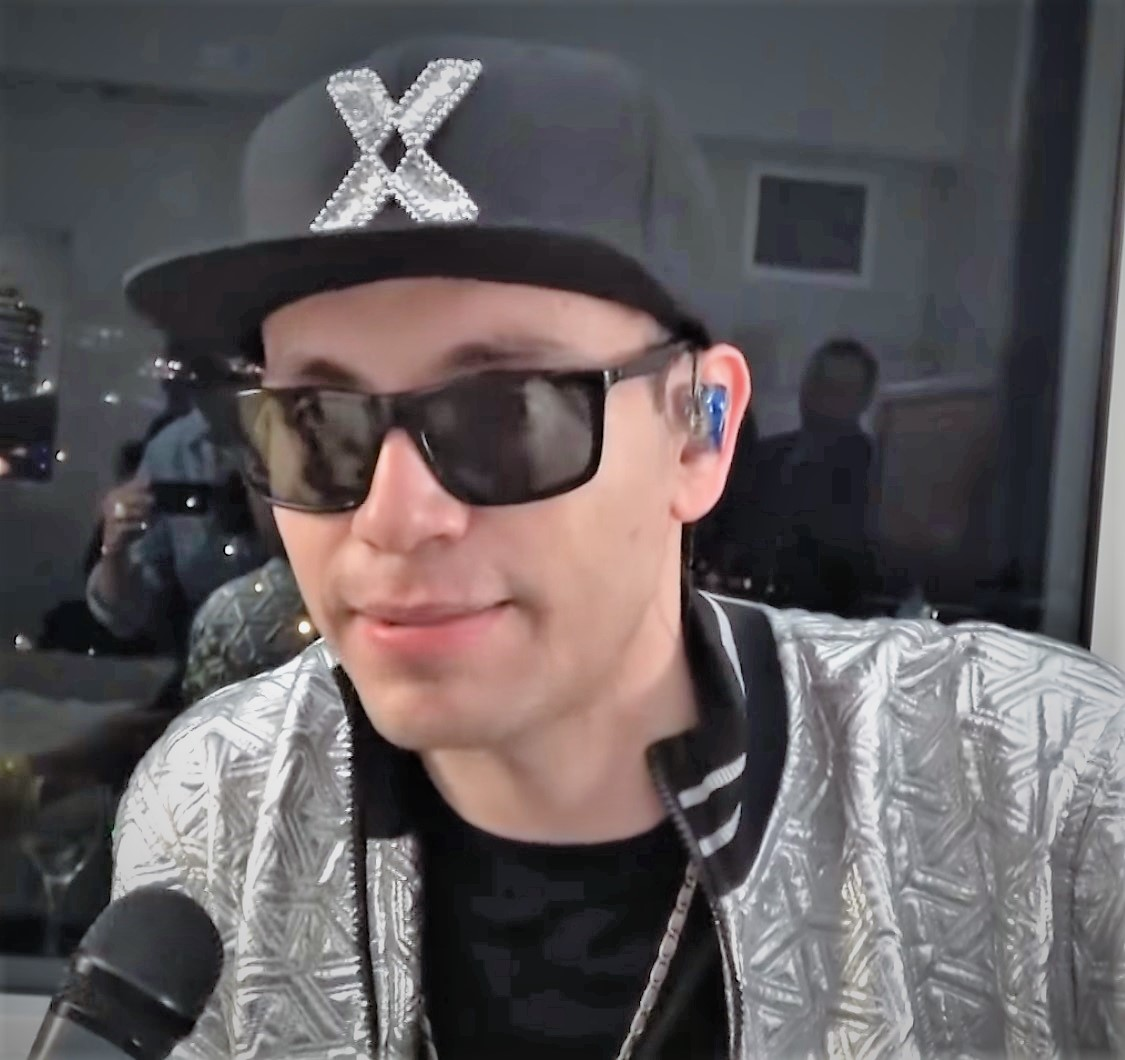
- Raymix during a 2018 interview
- Studio albums: 4
- EPs: 4
- Compilation albums: 3
- Remix albums: 1
- Singles: 20
- Collaborations: 20

Mexican musician Raymix has released four studio album, four extended play (EP), one remix album, three compilation EPs, and 40 singles (including twenty collaborations and guest appearances). Raymix started his music career in the early 2010s when he joined a trance project called Light & Wave with two other Mexican musicians. Around 2015, Raymix gained popularity thanks to his independently released song "Oye Mujer", which he wrote while he was doing a NASA educative internship. Raymix signed with Universal Music Latin Entertainment and in 2018 he released his debut album Oye Mujer, with the title song being re-released as his debut commercial single and also was remixed and launched as a duet with Colombian singer Juanes. The song topped the Billboard Regional Mexican Airplay and Tropical Airplay charts. Additionally, it reached number 6 on the Bubbling Under Hot 100 chart and has been certified 14× multi-platinum (Latin) by the Recording Industry Association of America (RIAA) and Diamond + 2× Platinum by the Asociación Mexicana de Productores de Fonogramas y Videogramas (AMPROFON).

Since then, Raymix has released multiple charting singles, including "Dónde Estarás", "Tú Eres la Razón", "Tú y Yo" (as a duet with Paulina Rubio) and "Llámame".

== Studio albums ==
List of studio albums, with selected chart positions and certifications
Title	Album details	Peak chart positions				Certifications
Title	Album details	US Latin	US Heat	US Trop.	MEX Reg.	Certifications
Oye Mujer	Released: 16 February 2018; Formats: CD, digital download; Label: Universal, Fonovisa	14	3	9	7	AMPROFON: Platinum; RIAA: 8× Platinum (Latin)
Te Voy a Conquistar	Released: 14 January 2022; Formats: CD, digital download; Label: Universal, Fonovisa	—	—	—	—	
Mi Otra Mitad	Released: 17 March 2023; Formats: CD, digital download; Label: Universal	—	—	—	—	
Canto de un Ángel	Released: 24 May 2024; Formats: CD, digital download; Label: Universal	—	—	—	—	
Raymix X	Released: 18 September 2026; Formats: CD, digital download; Label: Universal	—	—	—	—	
"—" denotes items that did not chart or were not released.

== Extended plays ==
Title	Album details
Fake Lover	Released: 31 May 2019; Formats: CD, digital download; Label: Universal, Fonovisa
Oye Mujer	Released: 6 October 2021; Formats: Digital download; Label: Universal
Traviesa	Released: 14 October 2021; Formats: Digital download; Label: Universal
Cumbia	Released: 3 November 2021; Formats: Digital download; Label: Universal
"—" denotes items that did not chart or were not released.

== Remix albums ==
Title	Album details
RAYMIXes	Released: 25 April 2025; Formats: CD, digital download; Label: Universal, Fonovisa

== Singles ==
List of singles, with selected chart positions and certifications, showing year released and album name
Title	Year	Peak chart positions					Certifications	Album
Title	Year	MEX	MEX Reg.	US Bub.	US Latin	US Trop.	Certifications	Album
"Oye Mujer" (solo or with Juanes)	2018	9	1	6	7	1	AMPROFON: Diamond+2× Platinum; RIAA: 53× Platinum (Latin)	Oye Mujer
"Dónde Estarás"	2018	—	3	—	28	—	AMPROFON: Platinum; RIAA: 2× Platinum (Latin)	Oye Mujer
"Perdóname"	2018	—	—	—	—	17	AMPROFON: Platinum	Oye Mujer
"Ángel Malvado"	2018	—	—	—	—	—	AMPROFON: Gold	Oye Mujer
"Primer Beso"	2018	—	—	—	—	—	AMPROFON: Platinum+Gold	Oye Mujer
"Tú Eres la Razón (Electrocumbia Remake)"	2019	19	5	—	36	3		Fake Lover
"El Noa Noa (Remix)" (with Georgel and Esteman, feat. Celso Piña and Mexican Institute of Sound)	2019	—	—	—	—	—		Non-album single
"Te Fuiste"	2019	17	—	—	—	—		Fake Lover
"Tú y Yo" (with Paulina Rubio)	2020	1	16	—	—	3	AMPROFON: Platinum	Te Voy a Conquistar
"Olvídame Tú" (with ICC)	2020	—	—	—	—	—		Te Voy a Conquistar
"Te Quito la Pena" (Karla Vallín feat. Raymix)	2020	—	—	—	—	—		Non-album singles
"Masoquista" (with Juan Solo)	2020	—	—	—	—	—		Non-album singles
"Y Se Dio" (with Juan Magán)	2020	—	—	—	—	—		Non-album singles
"Llámame"	2020	18	9	—	—	3		Te Voy a Conquistar
"Solo (Remix)" (with Esteman)	2020	—	—	—	—	—		Te Voy a Conquistar
"Prisionero (De la Cumbia)" (with Gepe)	2020	—	—	—	—	—		Non-album single
"Traviesa" (with Horacio Palencia and Aczino)	2021	—	—	—	—	—		Te Voy a Conquistar
"Espacial"	2021	—	—	—	—	—		Te Voy a Conquistar
"No Pienso Caer"	2021	—	—	—	—	—		Te Voy a Conquistar
"Te Voy a Conquistar" (with NZO)	2022	5	5	—	—	—		Te Voy a Conquistar
"Supernova"	2022	—	—	—	—	—		Mi Otra Mitad
"Desvelo" (C-Kan and Raymix)	2022	—	—	—	—	—		Mi Otra Mitad
"Corazón Enamorado" (Alberto Pedraza and Raymix)	2022	—	—	—	—	—		Non-album singles
"Nada"	2022	—	—	—	—	—		Mi Otra Mitad
"Cruda" (María León and Raymix)	2022	—	—	—	—	—		Mi Otra Mitad
"Para Levantarme del Suelo" (Patricia Manterola and Raymix)	2022	—	—	—	—	—		Non-album single
"55" (with Chiquis Rivera)	2022	—	—	—	—	—		Mi Otra Mitad
"El Final de Nuestra Historia" (with Grupo Quintanna)	2022	—	7	—	—	—		Mi Otra Mitad
"Los Caminos del Amor"	2022	—	—	—	—	—		Mi Otra Mitad
"Imposible"	2023	—	—	—	—	—		Mi Otra Mitad
"Amor Tóxico" (with Grupo K-L)	2023	—	—	—	—	—		Non-album single
"La Custodia"	2023	—	—	—	—	—		Non-album single
"Si Amas Algo Déjalo Ir" (with Oliver Contreras)	2023	—	—	—	—	—		Non-album single
"¡No Pasa Nada!" (with Marama)	2023	—	—	—	—	—		Canto de un Ángel
"Bailando" (feat. Sonido Pirata PAYA PAKA)	2023	—	—	—	—	—		Canto de un Ángel
"Ay Que Dolor" (with Saulo)	2024	—	—	—	—	—		Canto de un Ángel
"Secreto de Amor"	2024	—	—	—	—	—		Canto de un Ángel
"No Hay Vida Sin Ti"	2024	—	—	—	—	—		Canto de un Ángel
"Tus Jefes No Me Quieren" (with Grupo Ensamble)	2024	—	—	—	—	—		Non-album single
"Ni Tú Te la Crees" (with Los Socios del Ritmo)	2025	—	—	—	—	—		Non-album single
"Amor en Chino"	2025	—	—	—	—	—		Raymix X
"La Cumbia Fresa"	2025	—	—	—	—	—		Raymix X
"Cumbia Eh!" (with Mister Cumbia)	2025	—	—	—	—	—		Non-album single
"No Fui Yo"	2025	—	—	—	—	—		Raymix X
"Soy Migajero"	2026	—	—	—	—	—		Raymix X
"Cosmos" (with Insulini and Los Espantasuegras)	2026	—	—	—	—	—		Non-album single
"Si Tú Te Vas" (with Yulios Kumbia and La Clase Loka)	2026	—	—	—	—	—		Non-album single
"La Solicitud"	2026	—	—	—	—	—		Raymix X
"Me Dolió (Electrosalsa)"	2026	—	—	—	—	—		Raymix X
"Difácil"	2026	—	—	—	—	—		Raymix X
"No Queda Nada" (with Santa Griega and DJ Alexis Nájera)	2026	—	—	—	—	—		Non-album single
"—" denotes items that did not chart or were not released.
