= Lay It on the Line =

Lay It on the Line may refer to:

== Music ==
- Lay It on the Line (band), formed 2012

=== Albums ===
- Lay It on the Line, 1986 album by The Wailing Souls
- Lay It on the Line, 1988 album by Sam Riney featuring David Benoit as a sideman

=== Songs ===
- "Lay It on the Line", 1957 song by Johnny Bond
- "Lay It on the Line", 1969 song by Buddy Hampton, written by Ray Griff
- "Lay It on the Line", 1969 song by Jimmy Hughes, written by Charles Chalmers
- "Lay It on the Line", 1970 song by Teddy Hill, written Richard Law
- "Lay It on the Line", song by The Partridge Family from the 1971 album Up to Date
- "Lay It on the Line", 1974 single by The Crusaders, written by Stix Hooper
- "Lay It on the Line", 1977 song by Pal Rakes
- "Lay It on the Line", 1978 song by Michael Robinson, written by David McWilliams
- "Lay It on the Line", song by The Pointer Sisters from the 1978 album Energy
- "Lay It on the Line", song by Triumph from the 1979 album Just a Game
- "Lay It on the Line", song by Grim Reaper from the 1985 album Fear No Evil
- "Lay It on the Line", song by Elaine Charles from the 1989 album Disco de Oro Vol. 2
- "Lay It on the Line", song by Giant from the 1992 album Time to Burn
- "Lay It on the Line", song by 4Him from their 1999 greatest hits album Best Ones
- "Lay It on the Line", single by Canadian R&B singer Divine Brown from the 2008 album The Love Chronicles
- "Lay It on the Line", song by Matt Andersen from the 2011 album Coal Mining Blues
- "Lay It on the Line", 2011 song by Nick Pride and the Pimptones
