= Oye Mujer =

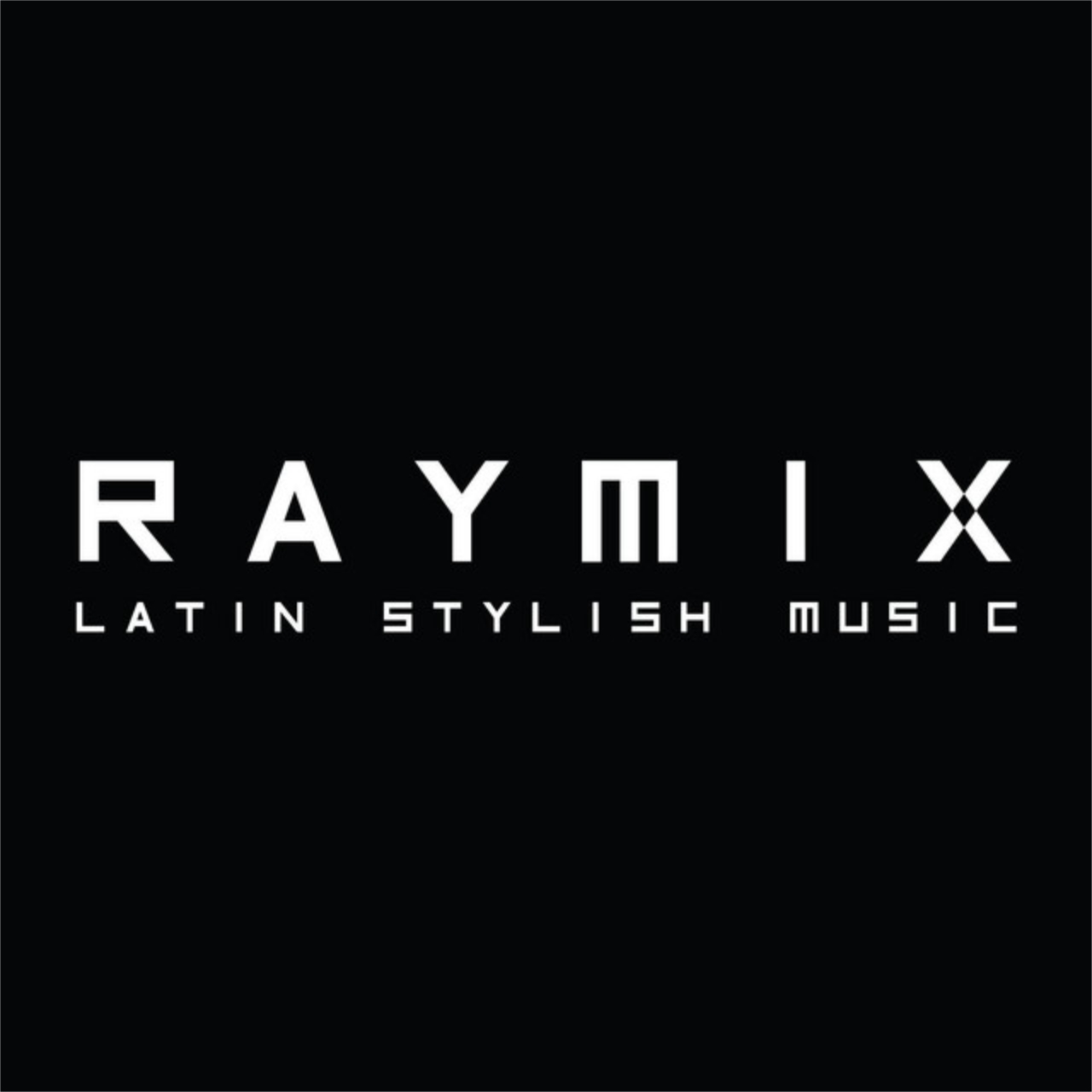

Single by Raymix

from the album Oye Mujer
- Language: Spanish
- English title: "Hey Woman"
- Released: 13 November 2015
- Genre: Electrocumbia
- Length: 4:19
- Label: Universal Music Latin Entertainment
- Songwriter: Edmundo Gómez Moreno
- Producer: Raymix

Raymix singles chronology
"Oye Mujer" (2015)	"¿Dónde Estarás?" (2018)

Audio sample
- Raymix - "Oye Mujer": file; help

Music video
- "Oye Mujer" on YouTube

"Oye Mujer" is the debut single by Mexican musician Raymix, which was originally self-released on 13 November 2015, later re-released through Universal Music Latin Entertainment, as the lead single and title track from his 2018 album of the same name. A remix version with Colombian singer Juanes was released on 24 April 2018.

== Background and release ==
In 2013, while at a NASA education internship, Raymix would start listening to Mexican cumbias and it led to him composing "Oye Mujer", a year later. The song's music video was released on 20 September 2015 and the song was released as a standalone single two months later. Upon release, the song would eventually become popular among sonideros and had been illegally distributed in tianguis markets.

== Critical reception ==
Writing for WARP Magazine, Oscar Adame stated that "Oye Mujer" has an "innovative instrumental base" and compared it with the sound of Celso Piña and Chico Che.

== Commercial performance ==
Following the release of the remix version of "Oye Mujer", with Juanes, the song began debuting on charts in the United States in 2018. It peaked atop the US Regional Mexican Airplay chart, on the issue dated 5 May 2018, while on the US Tropical Airplay chart, it peaked atop on the issue dated 21 May 2018 and stood atop the chart for 12 consecutive weeks. It also peaked at number five on the US Latin Airplay chart. In 2020, the song was certified 14× Platinum, in the Latin field, by the Recording Industry Association of America (RIAA).

In Mexico, "Oye Mujer" was certified Diamond+2× Platinum by the Asociación Mexicana de Productores de Fonogramas y Videogramas (AMPROFON). The song also peaked at number nine on the Billboard Mexico Airplay chart, while it peaked at number two on Mexico Popular Airplay and number 33 on Mexico Español Airplay.

== Charts ==
=== Weekly charts ===
Weekly chart performance for "Oye Mujer"
Chart (2018)	Peak position
Mexico Airplay (Billboard)	9
US Bubbling Under Hot 100 (Billboard)	6
US Hot Latin Songs (Billboard)	7
US Latin Airplay (Billboard)	5
US Regional Mexican Airplay (Billboard)	1
US Tropical Airplay (Billboard)	1

=== Year-end charts ===
Year-end chart performance for "Oye Mujer"
Chart (2018)	Position
US Hot Latin Songs (Billboard)	13

== Certifications ==
Region	Certification	Certified units/sales
Mexico (AMPROFON)	2× Diamond+2× Platinum	720,000^{‡}
United States (RIAA)	53× Platinum (Latin)	3,180,000^{‡}
^{‡} Sales+streaming figures based on certification alone.
