= Raymix =

Mexican musician and aerospace engineer

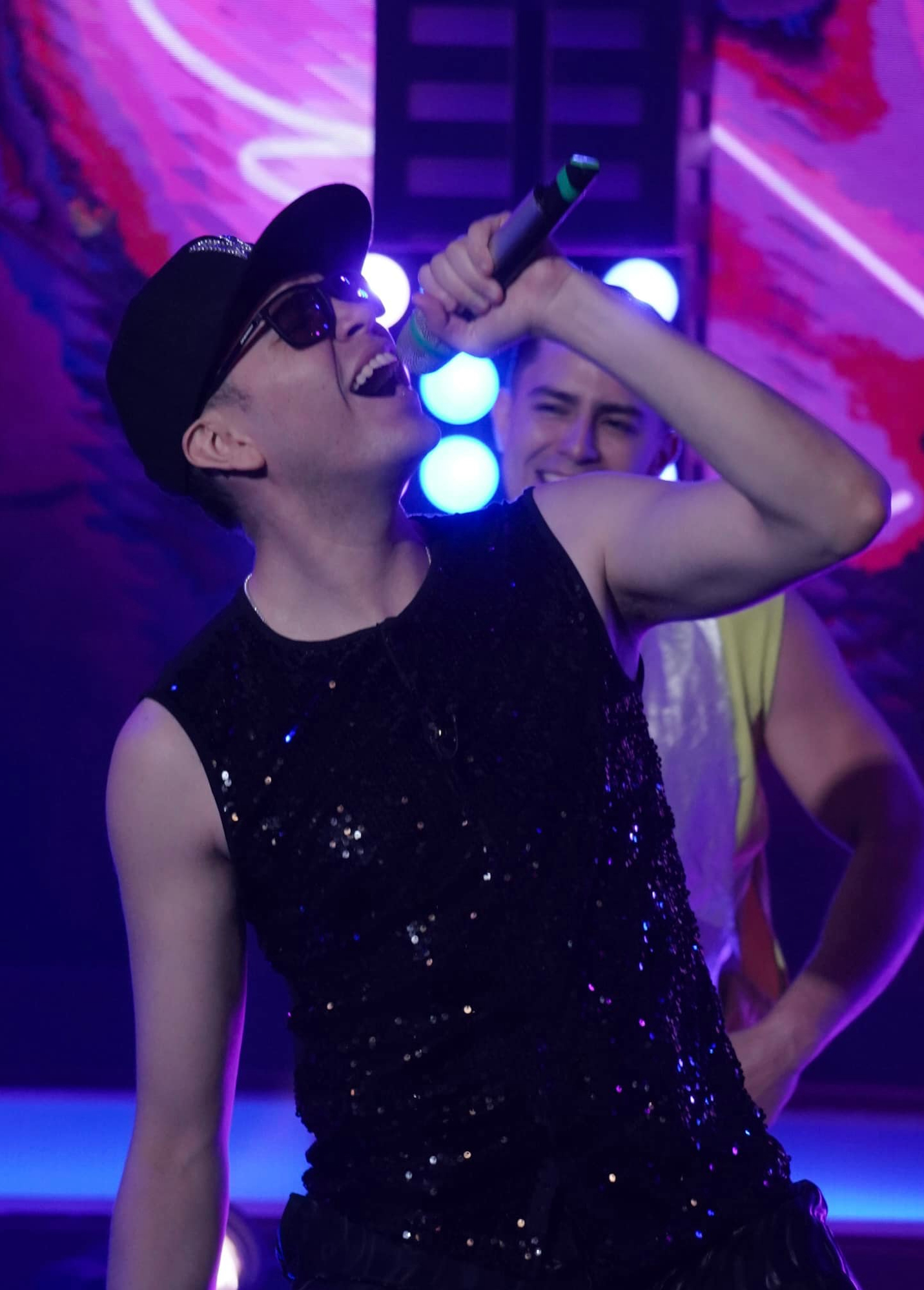
- Raymix during a 2024 concert

Background information
- Born: Edmundo Gómez Moreno; 17 February 1991 (age 35); San José El Vidrio, Nicolás Romero, State of Mexico
- Genres: Electrocumbia; trance
- Occupations: Singer, composer, aerospace engineer
- Instruments: Vocals, keyboard
- Years active: 2011–present
- Label: Universal Music
- Website: YouTube

Edmundo Gómez Moreno (born 17 February 1991), known professionally as Raymix, is a Mexican musician and aerospace engineer. Nicknamed El Rey de la Electrocumbia ("The King of Electrocumbia"), he started his music career in the early 2010s as part of the trance project Light & Wave, alongside two other Mexican musicians. Their song "Feeling the City" was featured on A State of Trance, a radio show Armin van Buuren hosts. In 2013, Raymix participated in an educational internship at NASA, where he contributed to the development of a satellite.

Around 2015, Raymix rose to prominence with the song "Oye Mujer", which became popular among tianguis sellers, sonideros, and illegal music distributors. He later signed with Universal Music Latin Entertainment and, in 2018, released his debut album Oye Mujer. That same year, the title track was re-released Colombian singer Juanes. The song topped both the Billboard Regional Mexican Airplay and Tropical Airplay charts. Additionally, it reached number 6 on the Bubbling Under Hot 100 chart and has been certified 14× Latin multi-platinum by the Recording Industry Association of America (RIAA) and Diamond + 2× Platinum by the Asociación Mexicana de Productores de Fonogramas y Videogramas (AMPROFON). Following Oye Mujer, Raymix has released three additional albums: Te Voy a Conquistar (2022), Mi Otra Mitad (2023) and Canto de un Ángel (2024).

== Early life and artistry ==
Edmundo Gómez Moreno was born on 17 February 1991, in San José El Vidrio, a community located in Nicolás Romero, State of Mexico. Multiple members of his family are musicians, including his grandfather, his cousin, and his father, the latter a grupero musician. As a child, Gómez learned to play the keyboard, and his father taught him Los Tigres del Norte songs. He also learned to sing and to play the drum kit, guitar, and organ at church.

On his 18th birthday, Gómez received a MIDI controller, which he used to begin composing trance music. Between 2011 and 2012, he joined two other Mexican musicians to form the electronic music project Light & Wave. Their song "Feeling the City" was featured in two episodes of Armin van Buuren's radio show A State of Trance.

Around this time, Gómez was studying aerospace engineering at the Instituto Politécnico Nacional, in Mexico City, specializing in space systems. In 2013, he participated in a NASA education internship, where he contributed to the development of an educational satellite. During his time at NASA, he listened to cumbia music and, in 2014, he composed "Oye Mujer". According to Gómez, Alberto Pedraza (composer of "Guaracha sabrosona") lent him his loudspeakers, and with two cellphones and 3,000 pesos he recorded a music video for the song. In 2015, Gómez was unable to secure a job in the US despite his academic credentials.

Raymix defines his music style as a mixture of electronic music subgenres, such as trance, house, chill-out, and ambient, a fusion he refers to as "electrocumbia". His stage name is a combination of a nickname, "Ray", and "Mix", reflecting his interest in electronic music; the name was coined by a friend during their time in college. Raymix is also nicknamed "El Rey de la Electrocumbia" (Spanish for "The King of Electrocumbia").

== Career ==
=== 2015–2019: Breakthrough and Oye Mujer ===
"Oye Mujer"
A 17-second sample of "Oye Mujer". Oscar Adame wrote for WARP Magazine that it has an "innovative instrumental base" and compared it with the sound of Celso Piña and Chico Che.

"Oye Mujer" gained popularity among sonideros and was widely distributed through informal channels, including pirated copies sold in tianguis markets. In 2016, Raymix went on his debut tour in the United States. Although Sony Music Latin, Warner Music Latina and Universal Music Latin Entertainment expressed interest in signing him, Raymix ultimately chose the latter. His debut album, Oye Mujer, was released on 16 February 2018. The album peaked at number three on the Billboard Regional Mexican Albums chart, number seven on the Heatseekers Albums chart, number nine on the Tropical Albums chart, and number fourteen on the Top Latin Albums chart. On 25 February 2020, the Recording Industry Association of America (RIAA) certified Oye Mujer 2× Latin multi-platinum, and in Mexico, the album was certified Platinum by the Asociación Mexicana de Productores de Fonogramas y Videogramas (AMPROFON).

In April 2018, a remixed version of "Oye Mujer" was released as a duet with Colombian singer Juanes. In the United States, "Oye Mujer" topped the Billboard Tropical Airplay and the Regional Mexican Airplay charts, where it stayed for eleven consecutive weeks on the former chart. By the end of the year, the song was the most-performed song on both charts. It also peaked at number seven on the Hot Latin Songs, and number six on the Bubbling Under Hot 100. In Mexico, the song topped the Top 20 chart, and reached number nine on the national Airplay chart. On 25 February 2020, the RIAA certified "Oye Mujer" 14× Latin multi-platinum, certifying 840,000 copies sold.

"Dónde Estarás" was released as the follow-up single in March 2018. It peaked at number three on the Billboard Regional Mexican Airplay, and at number 28 on the Hot Latin Songs. On 25 February 2020, the RIAA certified the song 2× Latin multi-platinum. Other releases off Oye Mujer include "Perdóname", "Ángel Malvado", and "Primer Beso"; all of them received an AMPROFON certification. "Oye Mujer" ranked as the 99th most-listened-to song in Mexico in 2017. The remix of "Oye Mujer" and "Dónde Estarás" became the 12th and 33rd most-played songs of 2018, respectively.

=== 2019–2022: Fake Lover and Te Voy a Conquistar ===
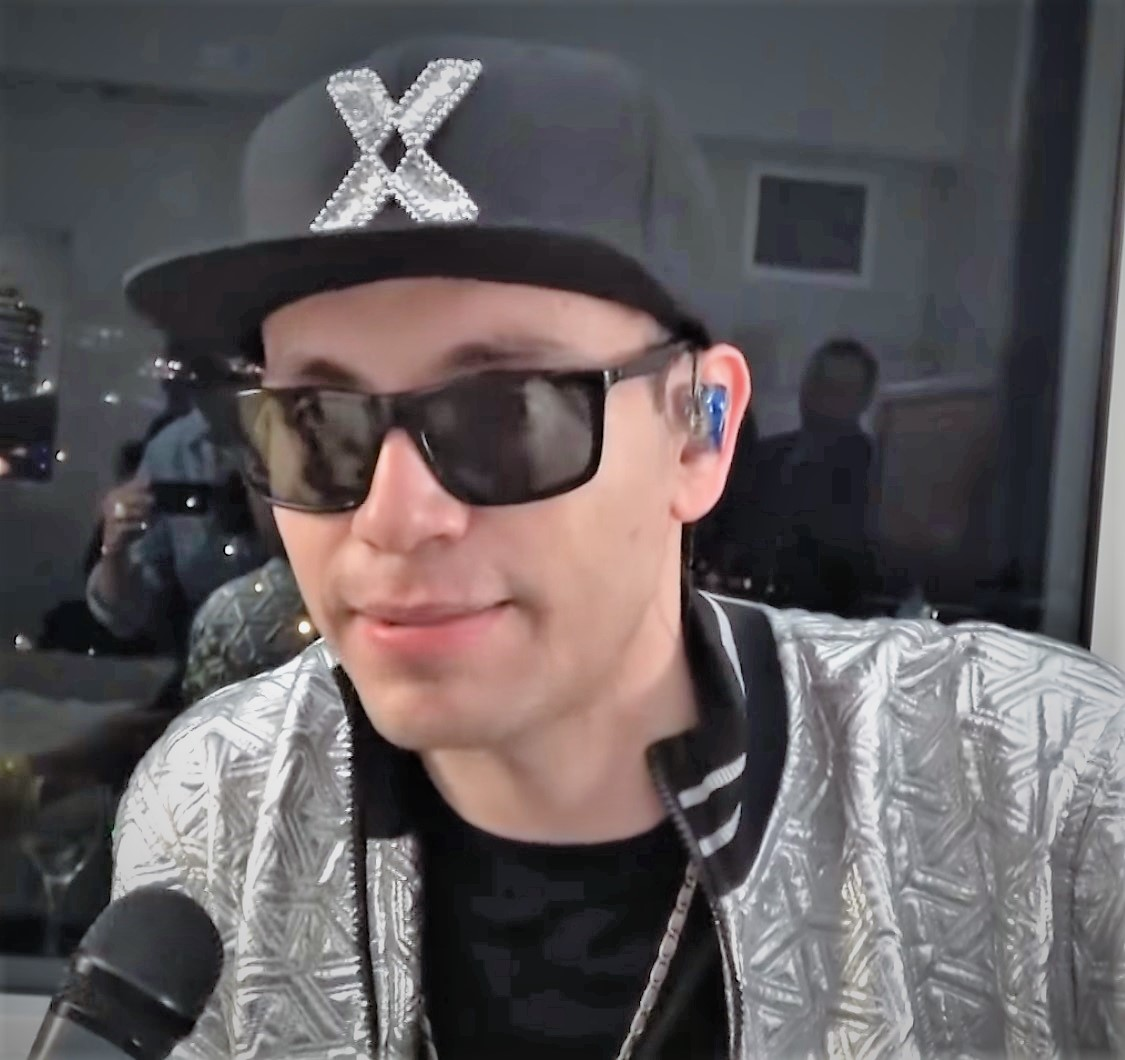
Raymix during a 2018 interview

In 2019, Raymix released his extended play (EP) Fake Lover. "Tú Eres la Razón (Electrocumbia Remake)", originally sung by la Arrolladora Banda El Limón, was launched as the lead single. Later, Raymix joined Georgel, Esteman, Celso Piña and Mexican Institute of Sound (MIS) with a remix of Juan Gabriel's "El Noa Noa". In March 2020, Raymix collaborated with Mexican pop singer Paulina Rubio on the song "Tú y Yo". In the US, it reached number three on the Tropical Airplay chart, number 16 on the Regional Mexican Airplay chart, and number 39 on the Latin Airplay chart. In Mexico, it topped the Top 20 chart, the Popular Airplay chart, and the Airplay chart. In May 2020, Raymix released the song "Olvídame Tú" as a duet with Mexican sonidero ICC. The following month, he worked with Karla Vallín in "Te Quito la Pena".

On 5 June 2020, Raymix came out as gay in a video, saying, "Today I am freer, happier than ever because now I know that I can express myself as I really am", and added that some acquaintances advised him to not do so because they consider that people are not prepared for a gay regional or cumbia musician. Raymix shared that he was young during this relationship, while the other person was not interested in a serious commitment. After their break-up, he came out to his father. Raymix also said he wrote the song because he wanted to build his career on his truth. By the end August 2020, he launched "Llámame", a song he described as an autobiographical, as it recounts his first relationship and how it ended. It reached number 18 on the Mexican Airplay chart, number nine on the Regional Mexican Airplay chart, and number three on the Tropical Airplay chart.

During the National Coming Out Day, on 11 October 2020, he performed at the OutMusik Fest, a festival featuring multiple LGBTQ musicians and their allies. In December of the same year, he remixed "Prisionero" by Chilean singer Gepe; the result was titled "Prisionero (De la Cumbia)" and had a record production by MIS.

Raymix released his second studio album, Te Voy a Conquistar, on 14 January 2022. The album features many of his releases that followed Oye Mujer. The title song, released with NZO, reached number five on both the Mexican Airplay chart and Regional Mexican Airplay chart.

=== 2023–2026: Mi Otra Mitad, Canto de un Ángel, and Raymix X ===
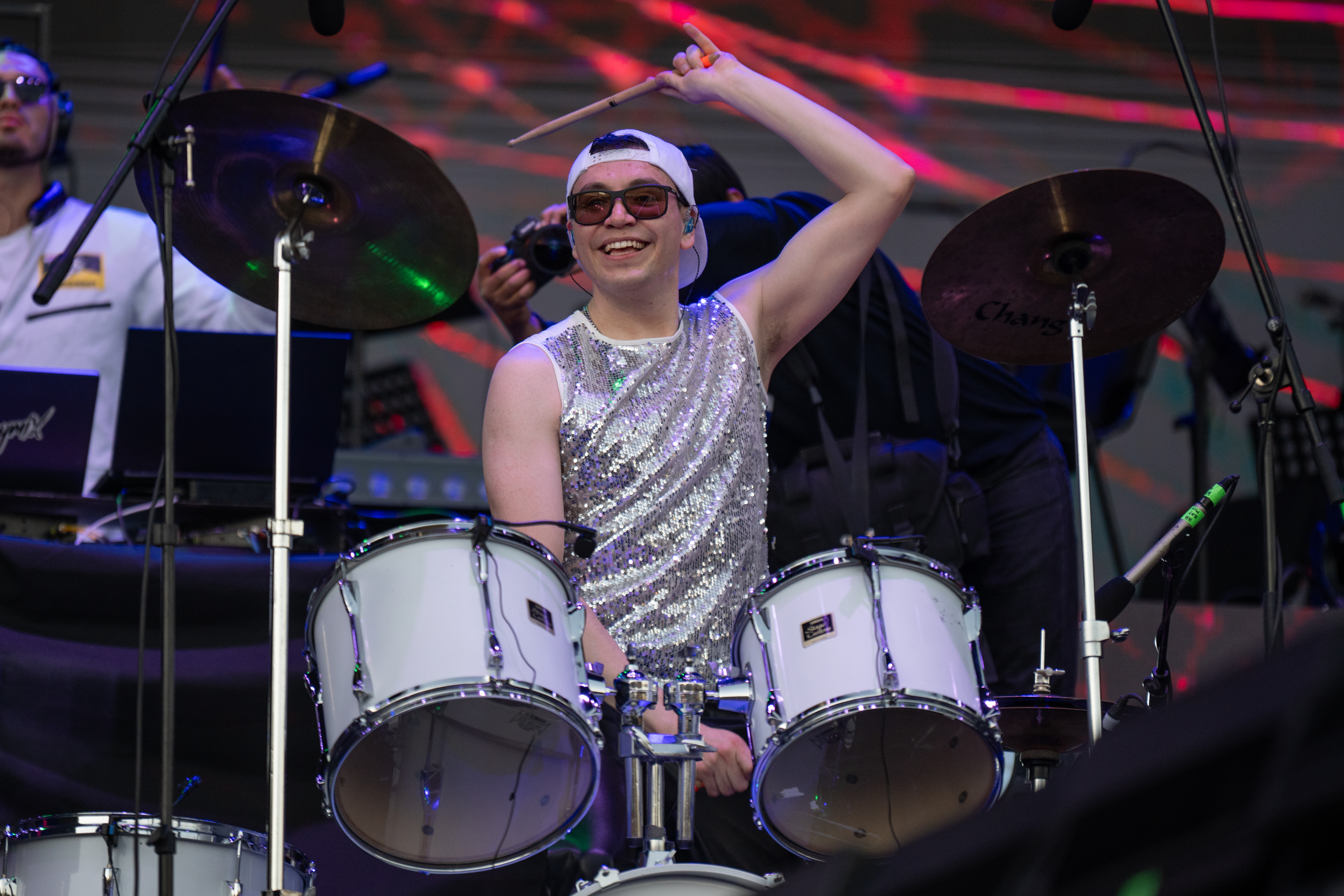
Raymix performing live during a Saint Valentine concert

Raymix released his third album, Mi Otra Mitad on 17 March 2023. The album marked a more personal turn in his music, with lyrics that explored themes of identity and self-acceptance. Drawing on his own experiences, Raymix used Mi Otra Mitad to reflect on emotional growth and relationships, including the complexities of living openly as a gay artist in a traditionally conservative genre as well as the search for connection and completeness, both in romantic terms and in the broader journey of self-discovery. The album included the duet "El Final de Nuestra Historia", performed with Grupo Quintanna. It peaked at number seven on the Regional Mexican Airplay chart.

His fourth studio album, Canto de un Ángel, was released in 2024. It features songs about love, heartbreak, and celebration, with a sound more aligned with the sonidero style, and includes fewer collaborations with other artists than in his previous releases. That year, he also toured the United States and performed at Mexico City Pride.

In September 2026, Raymix released his fifth studio album, Raymix X, and celebrated his tenth anniversary as a mainstream musician.

== Discography ==
- Oye Mujer (2018)
- Te Voy a Conquistar (2022)
- Mi Otra Mitad (2023)
- Canto de un Ángel (2024)
- Raymix X (2026)

== Awards ==
In 2018, Raymix was nominated for New Artist of the Year and Favorite Regional Mexican Song for "Oye Mujer" at the 4th Annual Latin American Music Awards, winning the latter. In 2019, Raymix was nominated at the 31st Lo Nuestro Awards for Revelation Artist of the Year, Regional Mexican Male Artist of the Year and Regional Mexican Song of the Year for "Oye Mujer". He was nominated at the 6th iHeartRadio Music Awards for Best New Latin Artist. At the 26th Billboard Latin Music Awards Raymix won Regional Mexican Song of the Year, and was nominated to New Artist of the Year, Regional Mexican Artist of the Year and Regional Mexican Album of the Year for Oye Mujer. He won Favorite Regional Mexican Album at the 5th Annual Latin American Music Awards for Oye Mujer.

In 2020, Raymix was nominated at the 32nd Lo Nuestro Awards for Regional Mexican Artist of the Year and Video of the Year for "Tú Eres la Razón (Electrocumbia Remake)". In 2021, along with Paulina Rubio, Raymix was nominated for Regional Mexican Cumbia Song of the Year for "Tú y Yo" at the 33rd Lo Nuestro Awards. In 2022, he was nominated for Regional Mexican Cumbia Song of the Year for "Llámame" at the 34th Lo Nuestro Awards.
