= Strange Desire (disambiguation) =

Strange Desire may refer to:

== Film ==
- Her Strange Desire alternative title of Potiphar's Wife, 1931 British romance film starring Nora Swinburne

== Music ==
=== Albums ===
- Strange Desire, a 2014 album by Bleachers
- Strange Desire, album by Georg Kajanus and Tim Dry as Noir, 1995

=== Songs ===
- "Strange Desire", rockabilly song by Jack Scott (singer)
- "Strange Desire", song by INXS from Welcome to Wherever You Are, B-side of "Beautiful Girl" (INXS song)
- "Strange Desire", song by Nacht und Nebel (band) 1983
- "Strange Desire", song by The Black Keys from Magic Potion (album), B-side of "Your Touch"
- "Strange Desire", song by Nicci Cable, in Mexican DJ group Polymarchs List of Polymarchs albums under Musart
