= Polymarchs =

Mexican mobile DJ collective

- Origin: Mexico City, Mexico
- Genres: Disco; electronica; eurobeat; experimental; industrial; italo disco; trance
- Years active: 1978–present
- Labels: Musart; Sony Music
- Members: Apolinar Silva de la Barrera; Victor Estrella
- Past members: Marco Antonio Silva de la Barrera (Tony Barrera); Maria Silva de la Barrera; Elisa Silva de la Barrera; Luis Silva de la Barrera

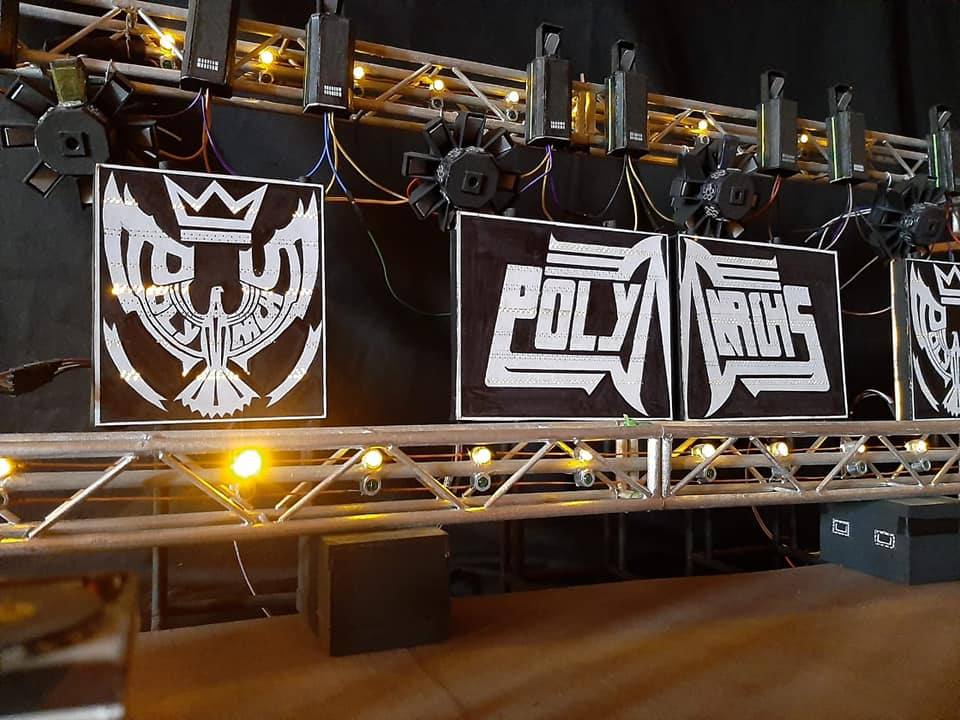
A replica of the original rig used by Polymarchs in the 1990s with the iconic logo in the foreground.

Polymarchs is a mobile DJ collective based in Mexico City, established in 1978 by Apolinar Silva de la Barrera and his sister María. The group is recognized for its contributions to Mexico's electronic dance music scene, transitioning through various musical trends such as disco and electronic dance music over several decades. Polymarchs is known for its large-scale events, innovative sound production, and visually distinctive promotional materials, including flyers designed by Jaime Ruelas, which gained prominence during the 1980s and early 2000s.

Initially performing in local neighborhoods of Mexico City, Polymarchs gained popularity in the early 1980s, eventually headlining sold-out shows. Despite the decline of disco's popularity in Mexico during the late 1980s, the group successfully adapted its musical style to resonate with younger audiences, helping it maintain relevance.

As of today, Polymarchs continues to operate in the Mexico City area, with its resident DJs performing at various events and maintaining its presence in the local music scene.

== The Origins (1978-1980s) ==
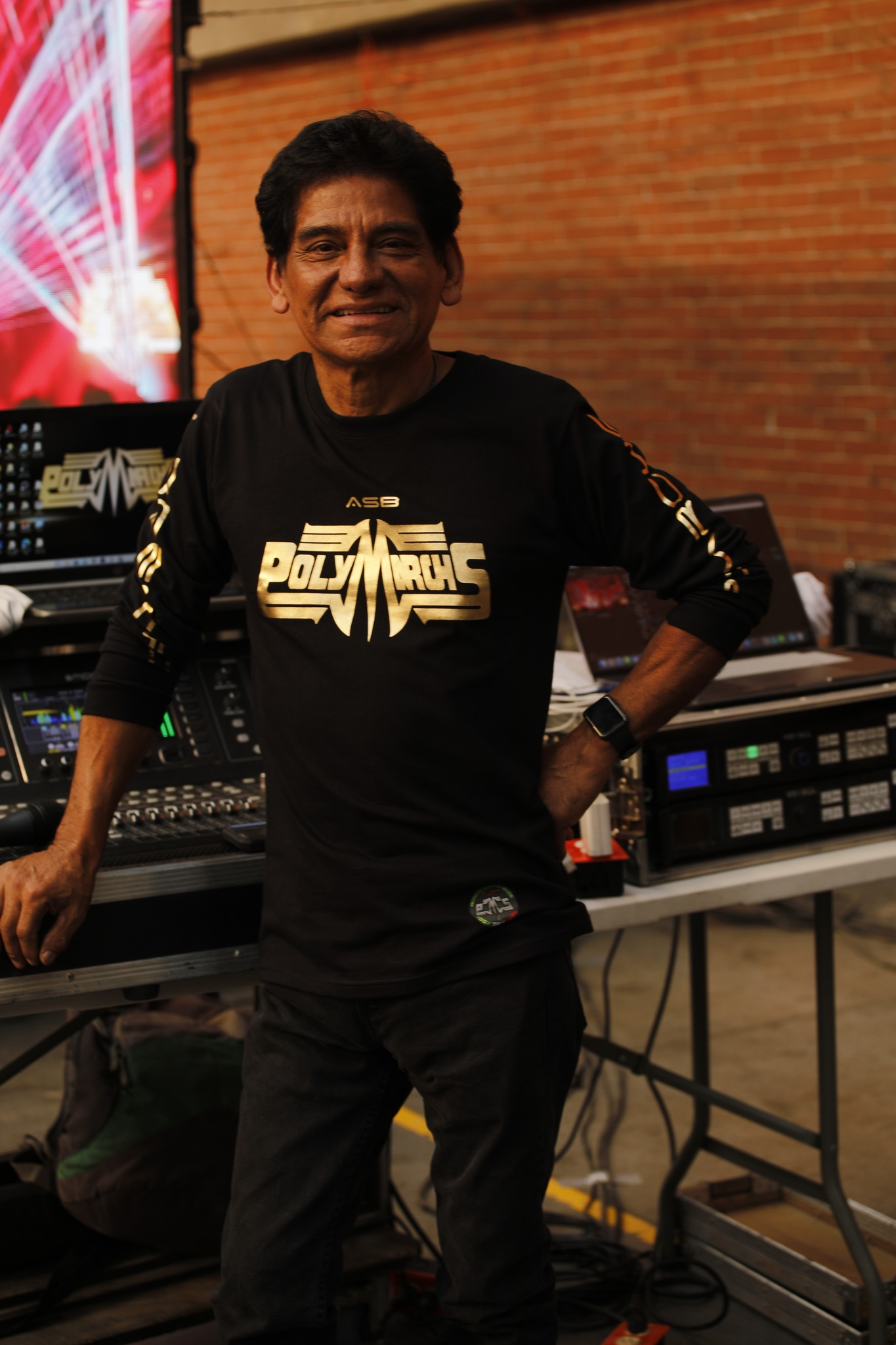
Apolinar Silva de la Barrera, founder, at a Polymarchs show

Polymarchs was established in the late 1970s by Apolinar Silva de la Barrera, a student of electromechanics at Mexico City's IPN with an interest in disco music and the emerging sonidero scene in Mexico City. Together with his sister Maria and siblings Elisa and Luis, Silva began hosting small parties and events in various neighborhoods. The name Polymarchs was derived from their family names: "Poly" for Apolinar, "Mar" for Maria, "Ch" for Lichi, and "S" for their surname, Silva. By 1980, Marco Antonio Silva, also known as Tony Barrera, joined the collective as a DJ, MC, and choreographer for their "show ballet." Barrera later became a recording artist, releasing several dance singles through Discos Musart in the 1990s.

The group became known for its emphasis on high-quality sound and visually striking performances. In the 1980s, Polymarchs introduced professional-grade JBL sound systems, which set them apart in the local music scene. Over time, they upgraded their equipment to include Meyer Sound Laboratories and L-Acoustics systems sourced internationally, as well as lighting designs developed in collaboration with Mexican companies.

== Rise to Fame (Mid to Late 1980s) ==
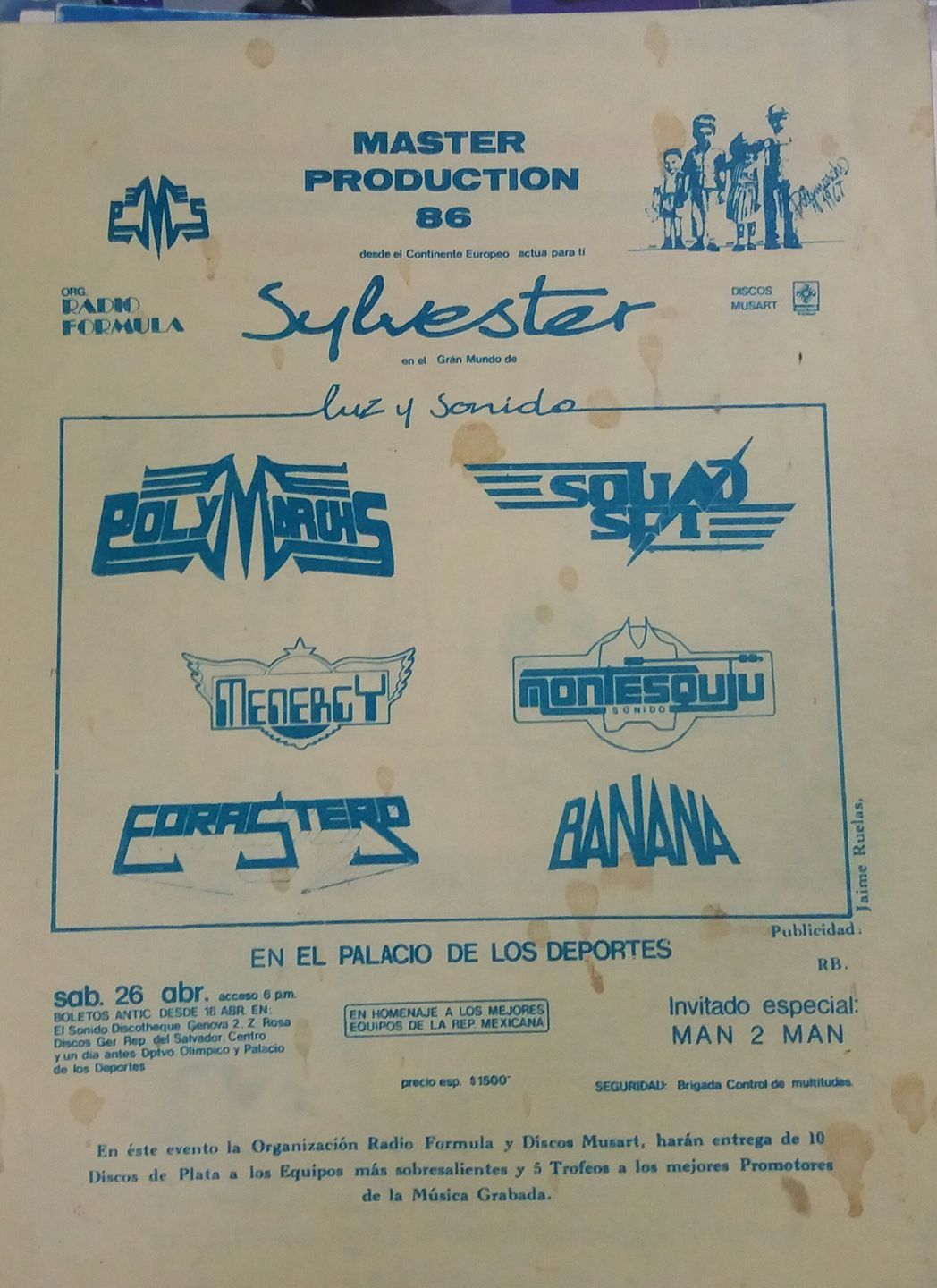
Flyer for the Palacio de los Deportes show in 1986. These flyers have become collectibles among Polymarchs's fanbase.

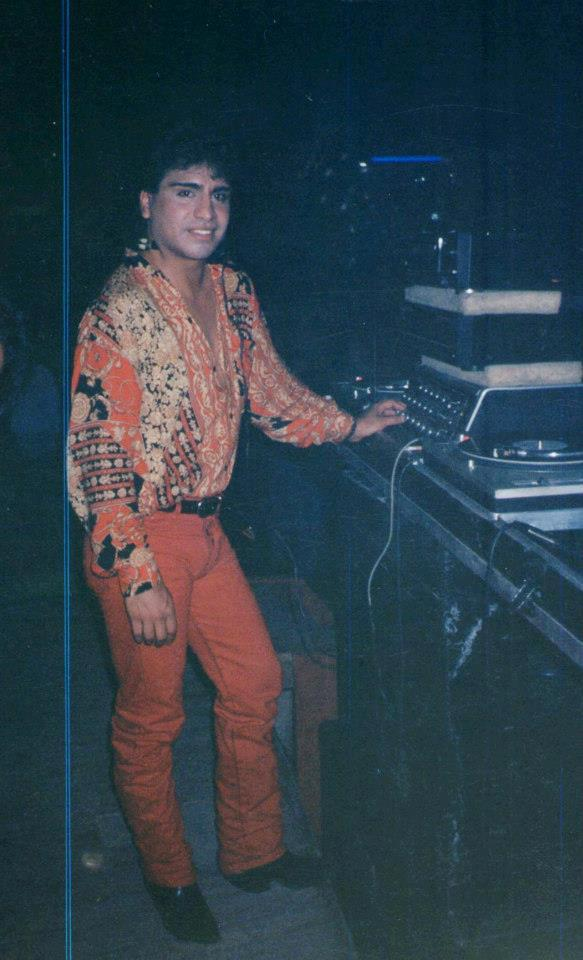
Tony Barrera poses for a photo at a Polymarchs show, late 1980s.

In the mid-1980s, Polymarchs gained prominence in Mexico's music scene with performances at large-scale venues. Their shows at the Palacio de los Deportes in 1986 and 1989 reportedly drew over 30,000 attendees each, marking significant milestones for sonidero-style events. During this period, the collective incorporated Hi-NRG and Euro disco genres into their sets, distinguishing their performances from other acts and building a dedicated fanbase. Polymarchs also brought international performers such as Gloria Gaynor and Sylvester to their events, enhancing their reputation as a major collective in Latin America.

At the 1986 Palacio de los Deportes event, Maria Silva introduced her own collective, Rhamses, which featured branding similar to Polymarchs. Maria served as both the MC and choreographer for Rhamses' dance troupe, the Mary Super Show. Rhamses continued to perform alongside Polymarchs at events through the mid-1990s, expanding the collective's presence in the music scene.

== Musical Shift and Personal Challenges (Early 1990s) ==
By 1990, the popularity of Hi-NRG and Eurobeat music in Mexico began to decline, giving way to genres such as House and New Beat. In response to these changes, Polymarchs adapted their musical direction by reducing their Hi-NRG content in live shows and incorporating the emerging sounds into their sets. While this shift was part of their effort to stay relevant, it was met with resistance from some members of their fanbase, who had developed a strong attachment to their previous musical style.

In 1992, Apolinar Silva experienced a serious accident, and doctors initially predicted that he would be unable to walk again. Despite this, he was able to recover and return to his role within the collective.

== Comeback and International Expansion (Mid 1990s) ==
In 1993, Polymarchs re-released their "Discos de Oro" compilation set, which had originally been issued on vinyl, as a CD. This allowed their earlier hits to reach a new audience while maintaining their connection to their past work.

During this time, the collective gained additional exposure on television through their involvement with TV Azteca, particularly on the show Alfa Dance, where they showcased their visual setups and lighting designs. Polymarchs also began its association with Mexico City's Alfa 91.3, providing a platform for their broadcasts and mixes.

By 1996, Polymarchs expanded internationally with their first U.S. tour, performing in cities with significant Mexican-American populations, such as Los Angeles, New York, and Chicago, bringing their performances to a broader audience. A second U.S. tour followed in 2002.

Tony Barrera, a key figure in Mexico's music and nightlife scenes, continued his work with Polymarchs despite receiving offers from high-profile projects. Additionally, Barrera became involved in humanitarian efforts, including supporting the reconstruction of Puerto Ángel, Oaxaca after Hurricane Pauline in 1997.

== Death of Tony & The Arrival of Victor Estrella (1998) ==
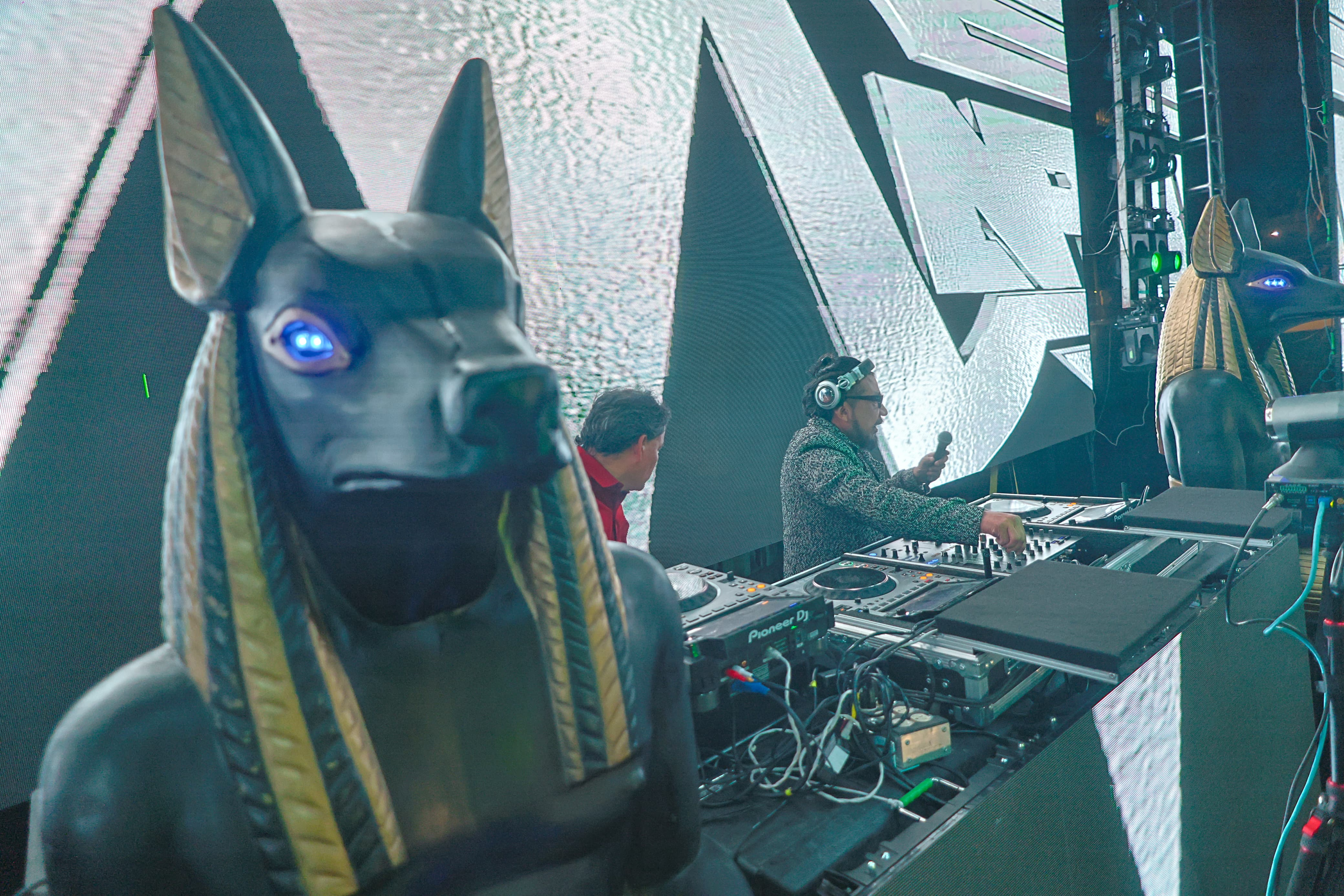
Polymarchs' Víctor Estrella.

On May 26, 1998, Tony Barrera was found deceased in his Culhuacán apartment. His death was ruled a homicide, with evidence suggesting involvement of individuals believed to be acquaintances. While the exact motives remain unclear, speculation surrounding the incident has included suggestions of homophobia, as Tony was rumored to be gay.

Tony's death had a significant impact on the music community. His funeral in Puerto Ángel was attended by many who paid tribute to his contributions to music and his hometown. In remembrance, Alfa Radio 91.3 aired his final mix-show, and Discos Musart released a compilation album, Tony Barrera – 1963–1998, featuring many of his singles. Despite this loss, Apolinar and the collective continued their work to honor his legacy.

Following Tony's passing, Victor Estrella joined Polymarchs as the new resident DJ. Previously a member of Winners, a prominent sonidero collective in Mexico City, Victor introduced new energy and musical innovation to the group. His contributions helped redefine the collective's sound and maintain its relevance, bridging the past with the future. Victor remains the resident DJ of Polymarchs.

== Adapting to New Trends and Expanding Reach (2000s) ==
The 2000s were a period of adaptation and growth for Polymarchs as the collective navigated evolving music trends and expanded its influence.

In the early 2000s, Polymarchs partnered with Top 40 radio station Stereo 97.7 to produce a series of concerts, similar to their earlier collaborations with Alfa 91.3. While these events were not explicitly branded as Polymarchs, the collective contributed dancers, choreography, and their renowned sound and lighting equipment, playing a significant role in their success through the late 2000s. They also worked with classic hits station Mix 106.5 to broadcast a weekly hour-long mix-show, featuring genres such as Hi-NRG, Italo Disco, Eurobeat, and newer Italo Disco tracks.

During this period, Polymarchs launched the Estelares de Polymarchs series in collaboration with Discos Musart. These compilations featured full-length versions of tracks performed at Polymarchs events, becoming sought-after collectibles among DJs and fans.

By 2005, the collective began incorporating more mainstream genres such as Reggaeton and Tribal House, with Victor Estrella leading the transition. Estrella produced several tracks under the Discos Musart label, reflecting Polymarchs' adaptation to a broader musical range. The Polymarchs Latino series, released in 2007, introduced the collective to a wider audience across the United States, Brazil and Latin America through ToCo International.

In 2008, Polymarchs celebrated their 30th anniversary with a major event at the Pepsi Center within Mexico City's World Trade Center. The event featured notable Italo Disco acts Ken Laszlo, Brian Ice, and Fred Ventura, further solidifying Polymarchs' legacy in Mexico's music and nightlife scene.

== Uncertainty (2010s) ==
In the years following, Polymarchs continued to hold a series of smaller shows across the greater Mexico City area, maintaining a presence within the changing musical landscape.

By the mid-2010s, Apolinar Silva expressed uncertainty about the future of the collective, with speculation rising about the possibility of disbandment. This uncertainty was compounded by the end of their partnership with Discos Musart in 2014, marking the release of their final project with the label. Despite these challenges, Polymarchs celebrated their 40th anniversary in 2019 to great fanfare.

== Modern Times (2021-present) ==
In 2021, during the height of the COVID-19 pandemic, Polymarchs adapted to the restrictions by hosting a livestreamed virtual event. The broadcast featured their signature lightshow and several energetic musical sets, demonstrating their ability to maintain their immersive experience even without a live audience.

That same year, John Barrera and DJ Medusas officially joined Polymarchs, marking a new chapter for the collective.

John Barrera, Apolinar's son, had been involved with the collective for several years, performing alongside Victor Estrella. His deep connection to Polymarchs’ legacy and his growth as a DJ made him a natural addition to the team.

DJ Medusas, a prominent figure in the progressive EDM, Hi-NRG, and Techno scenes from the 90s through the 2010s, brought his extensive experience and a fresh perspective to the collective.

In 2024, Polymarchs began an hour-long weekly mix-show titled Estudio Polymarchs on contemporary hit radio station Los 40 Mexico. Hosted by John Barrera and Victor Estrella, the show features Nu-Disco, House and mash-ups.

== New Year's Eve show (2025) ==
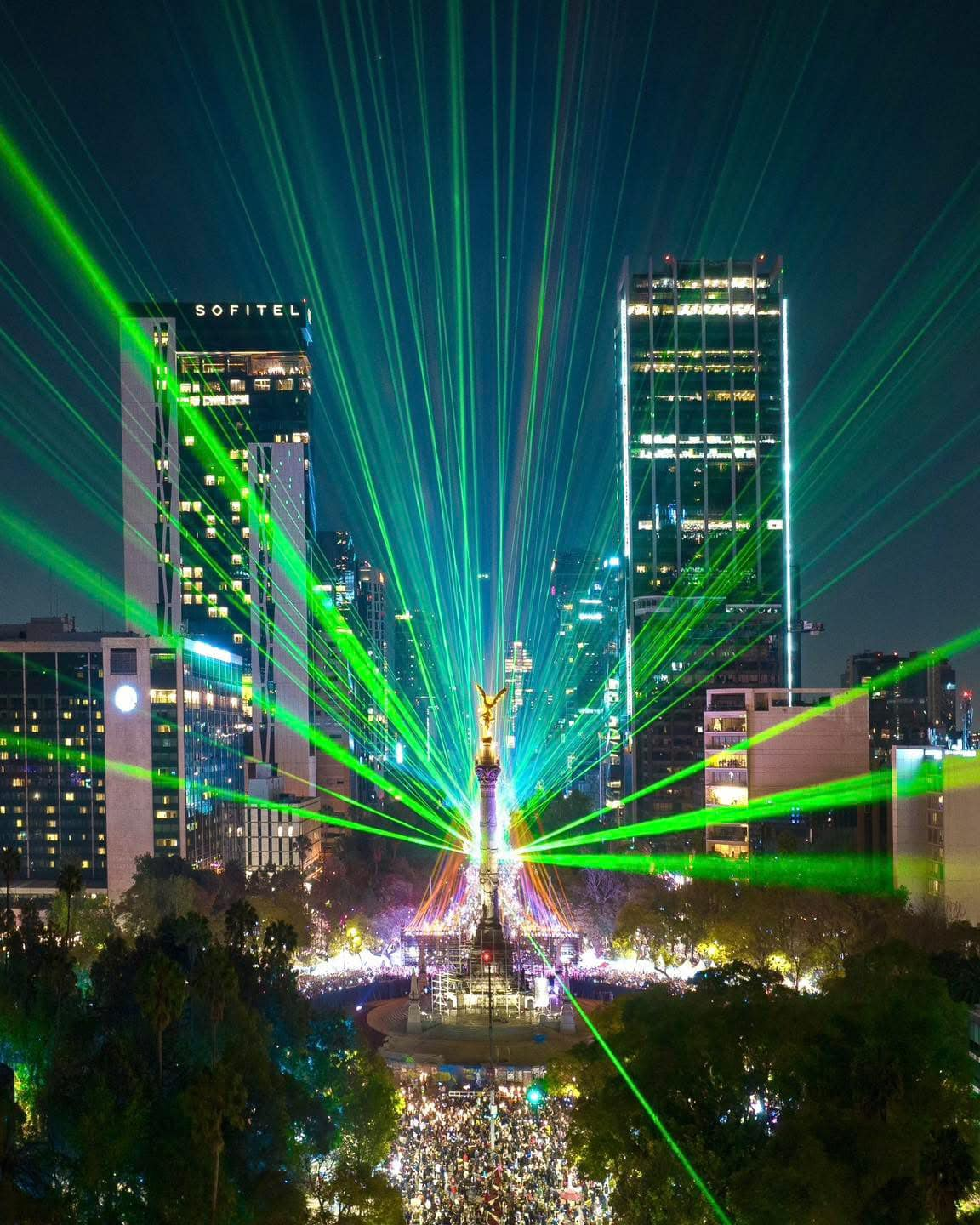
Polymarchs during the New Year's Eve 2025 event at Paseo de la Reforma. The Angel de la Independencia is in the foreground.

In collaboration with the Secretaría de Gobernación, Polymarchs organized a New Year's Eve event on Paseo de la Reforma in Mexico City to welcome 2025. The event attracted over 200,000 attendees and featured five different sound and lighting setups along the boulevard. In addition to Polymarchs, the event included performances from other acts, such as La Changa, a well-known sonidero group, highlighting the country's sound system culture.

The event became the subject of controversy when it was reported that Polymarchs received $12 million MXN for their participation. Some individuals raised questions about the funding, citing concerns over a potential conflict of interest due to the fact that Paulina Silva Rodriguez, the head of communications for Mexican President Claudia Sheinbaum, is the daughter of Apolinar Silva.

At the time of reporting, government officials had not issued a public comment regarding the situation.

== See also ==
- Sonidero
- DJs
- Music of Mexico
