= List of number-one albums of 2020 (Mexico) =

Top 100 Mexico is a record chart published weekly by AMPROFON (Asociación Mexicana de Productores de Fonogramas y Videogramas), a non-profit organization composed by Mexican and multinational record companies. This association tracks record sales (physical and digital) in Mexico. On July 2, the chart was publicly updated for the last time along with the list of 100 best-selling albums for the middle of the year. As of July 9, the chart was discontinued.

== Chart history ==
| Chart date | Album | Artist | Reference(s) |
|---|---|---|---|
| 3 January | Fine Line | Harry Styles | |
| 9 January | Fine Line | Harry Styles | — |
| 16 January | Fine Line | Harry Styles | |
| 23 January | Rare | Selena Gomez | |
| 30 January | Fine Line | Harry Styles | |
| 6 February | Walls | Louis Tomlinson | |
| 13 February | Sie7e | Danna Paola | |
| 20 February | Hecho en México | Alejandro Fernández | |
| 27 February | Hecho en México | Alejandro Fernández | |
| 5 March | Hecho en México | Alejandro Fernández | |
| 12 March | Memoria Futuro | Siddhartha | |
| 19 March | Heartbreak Weather | Niall Horan | |
| 26 March | Hecho en México | Alejandro Fernández | |
| 2 April | After Hours | The Weeknd | |
| 9 April | After Hours | The Weeknd | |
| 16 April | MTV Unplugged/Música de Fondo | Zoé | |
| 23 April | MTV Unplugged/Música de Fondo | Zoé | |
| 30 April | Vessel | Twenty One Pilots | |
| 7 May | Hecho en México | Alejandro Fernández | |
| 14 May | Vessel | Twenty One Pilots | |
| 21 May | — | | |
| 28 May | Fine Line | Harry Styles | |
| 4 June | Fine Line | Harry Styles | |
| 11 June | Fine Line | Harry Styles | |
| 18 June | Chromatica | Lady Gaga | |
| 25 June | Chromatica | Lady Gaga | |
| 2 July | Chromatica | Lady Gaga | |
"—" denotes week with unknown information.

== See also ==
- List of number-one songs of 2020 (Mexico)
