= List of number-one songs of 2020 (Mexico) =

This is a list of the number-one songs of 2020 in Mexico. The airplay chart rankings are published by Monitor Latino, based on airplay across radio stations in Mexico using the Radio Tracking Data, LLC in real time. Charts are compiled from Monday to Sunday.

The streaming charts are published by AMPROFON (Asociación Mexicana de Productores de Fonogramas y Videogramas).

== Chart history (airplay) ==
Besides the General chart, Monitor Latino publishes "Pop", "Popular" (Regional Mexican music) and "Anglo" charts. Monitor Latino provides two lists for each of these charts: the "Audience" list ranked the songs according to the estimated number of people that listened to them on the radio during the week. The "Tocadas" (Spins) list ranked the songs according to the number of times they were played on the radio during the week.

=== General ===
Issue date	Song (Audience)	Song (Spins)	Ref.
5 January	"Que Tire Pa Lante"^{Daddy Yankee}	"Escondidos"^{La Adictiva}	
12 January	"Que Tire Pa Lante"^{Daddy Yankee}	"Escondidos"^{La Adictiva}	
19 January	"Escondidos"^{La Adictiva}	"Que Levante la Mano"^{Remmy Valenzuela}	
26 January	"Muévelo"^{Nicky Jam featuring Daddy Yankee}	"Solo tú"^{Calibre 50}	
2 February	"Muévelo"^{Nicky Jam featuring Daddy Yankee}	"Tusa"^{Karol G featuring Nicki Minaj}	
9 February	"Me Gusta"^{Shakira featuring Anuel AA}	"Te olvidé"^{Alejandro Fernández}	
16 February	"Me Gusta"^{Shakira featuring Anuel AA}	"Te olvidé"^{Alejandro Fernández}	
23 February	"Tequila"^{Juanes featuring Christian Nodal}	"Te olvidé"^{Alejandro Fernández}	
1 March	"Tequila"^{Juanes featuring Christian Nodal}	"Tequila"^{Juanes featuring Christian Nodal}	
8 March	"Te olvidé"^{Alejandro Fernández}	"Te olvidé"^{Alejandro Fernández}	
15 March	"Fantasía"^{Ozuna}	"Te olvidé"^{Alejandro Fernández}	
22 March	"Perdiendo la cabeza"^{Carlos Rivera, Becky G and Pedro Capó}	"Te olvidé"^{Alejandro Fernández}	
29 March	"Perdiendo la cabeza"^{Carlos Rivera, Becky G and Pedro Capó}	"Cuanto a que te olvido"^{Banda Los Sebastianes}	
5 April	"Morado"^{J Balvin}	"Cuanto a que te olvido"^{Banda Los Sebastianes}	
12 April	"Definitivamente"^{Daddy Yankee featuring Sech}	"Cuanto a que te olvido"^{Banda Los Sebastianes}	
19 April	"Definitivamente"^{Daddy Yankee featuring Sech}	"Se me olvidó"^{Christian Nodal}	
26 April	"Si me dices que si"^{Reik featuring Camilo and Farruko}	"Se me olvidó"^{Christian Nodal}	
3 May	"Se me olvidó"^{Christian Nodal}	"Se me olvidó"^{Christian Nodal}	
10 May	"Se me olvidó"^{Christian Nodal}	"Se me olvidó"^{Christian Nodal}	
17 May	"Se me olvidó"^{Christian Nodal}	"Se me olvidó"^{Christian Nodal}	
24 May	"Se me olvidó"^{Christian Nodal}	"Se me olvidó"^{Christian Nodal}	
31 May	"Tu y yo"^{Raymix and Paulina Rubio}	"Se me olvidó"^{Christian Nodal}	
7 June	"ADMV"^{Maluma}	"Tu y yo"^{Raymix featuring Paulina Rubio}	
14 June	"Tu y yo"^{Raymix featuring Paulina Rubio}	"Tu y yo"^{Raymix featuring Paulina Rubio}	
21 June	"Fútbol y Rumba"^{Anuel AA featuring Enrique Iglesias}	"Tu y yo"^{Raymix featuring Paulina Rubio}	
28 June	"Fútbol y Rumba"^{Anuel AA featuring Enrique Iglesias}	"Tu y yo"^{Raymix featuring Paulina Rubio}	
5 July	"Quiereme mientras se pueda"^{Manuel Turizo}	"Tu y yo"^{Raymix featuring Paulina Rubio}	
12 July	"Caramelo"^{Ozuna}	"Tu y yo"^{Raymix featuring Paulina Rubio}	
19 July	"Caramelo"^{Ozuna}	"Tu y yo"^{Raymix featuring Paulina Rubio}	
26 July	"Caramelo"^{Ozuna}	"Aquí Abajo"^{Christian Nodal}	
2 August	"Caramelo"^{Ozuna}	"Aquí Abajo"^{Christian Nodal}	
9 August	"Caramelo"^{Ozuna}	"Aquí Abajo"^{Christian Nodal}	
16 August	"Hawái"^{Maluma}	"Aquí Abajo"^{Christian Nodal}	
23 August	"Hawái"^{Maluma}	"Aquí Abajo"^{Christian Nodal}	
30 August	"Hawái"^{Maluma}	"Aquí Abajo"^{Christian Nodal}	
6 September	"Hawái"^{Maluma}	"Hawái"^{Maluma}	
13 September	"Ella dice"^{Tini featuring Khea}	"Aquí Abajo"^{Christian Nodal}	
20 September	"Que mal te fue"^{Natti Natasha}	"Aquí Abajo"^{Christian Nodal}	
27 September	"No bailes sola"^{Danna Paola featuring Sebastián Yatra}	"Hawái"^{Maluma}	
4 October	"Hawái"^{Maluma}	"Descepciones"^{Alejandro Fernández featuring Calibre 50}	
11 October	"Hawái"^{Maluma}	"Hawái"^{Maluma}	
18 October	"Que se sepa nuestro amor"^{Mon Laferte featuring Alejandro Fernández}	"Ya no quiero andar contigo"^{Joss Favela}	
25 October	"Que se sepa nuestro amor"^{Mon Laferte featuring Alejandro Fernández}	"Descepciones"^{Alejandro Fernández featuring Calibre 50}	
1 November	"Que se sepa nuestro amor"^{Mon Laferte featuring Alejandro Fernández}	"Ya no quiero andar contigo"^{Joss Favela}	
8 November	"Relación (remix)"^{Sech featuring Daddy Yankee, Farruko, J Balvin and Rosalía}	"Ya no quiero andar contigo"^{Joss Favela}	
15 November	"Del Mar"; Ozuna featuring Doja Cat and Sia	"Hawái"^{Maluma featuring The Weeknd}	
22 November	"Hawái"^{Maluma featuring The Weeknd}	"Hawái"^{Maluma featuring The Weeknd}	
29 November	"Hawái"^{Maluma featuring The Weeknd}	"Dime como quieres"^{Christian Nodal featuring Angela Aguilar}	
6 December	"Dime como quieres"^{Christian Nodal featuring Angela Aguilar}	"Dime como quieres"^{Christian Nodal featuring Angela Aguilar}	
13 December	"La nota" Manuel Turizo featuring Myke Towers and Rauw Alejandro	"Dime como quieres"^{Christian Nodal featuring Angela Aguilar}	
20 December	"Dime como quieres"^{Christian Nodal featuring Angela Aguilar}	"Dime como quieres"^{Christian Nodal featuring Angela Aguilar}	
27 December	"Dime como quieres"^{Christian Nodal featuring Angela Aguilar}	"Dime como quieres"^{Christian Nodal featuring Angela Aguilar}	

=== Pop ===
Issue date	Song (Audience)	Song (Spins)	Ref.
5 January	"Que Tire Pa Lante"^{Daddy Yankee}	"Tusa"^{Karol G featuring Nicki Minaj}	
12 January	"Tusa"^{Karol G featuring Nicki Minaj}	"Tusa"^{Karol G featuring Nicki Minaj}	
19 January	"Tusa"^{Karol G featuring Nicki Minaj}	"Tusa"^{Karol G featuring Nicki Minaj}	
26 January	"Tusa"^{Karol G featuring Nicki Minaj}	"Tusa"^{Karol G featuring Nicki Minaj}	
2 February	"Tusa"^{Karol G featuring Nicki Minaj}	"Tusa"^{Karol G featuring Nicki Minaj}	
9 February	"Tusa"^{Karol G featuring Nicki Minaj}	"Tusa"^{Karol G featuring Nicki Minaj}	
16 February	"Tusa"^{Karol G featuring Nicki Minaj}	"Tusa"^{Karol G featuring Nicki Minaj}	
23 February	"Perdiendo la cabeza"^{Carlos Rivera, Becky G and Pedro Capó}	"Tusa"^{Karol G featuring Nicki Minaj}	
1 March	"Perdiendo la cabeza"^{Carlos Rivera, Becky G and Pedro Capó}	"Tusa"^{Karol G featuring Nicki Minaj}	
8 March	"Perdiendo la cabeza"^{Carlos Rivera, Becky G and Pedro Capó}	"Tusa"^{Karol G featuring Nicki Minaj}	
15 March	"Fantasía"^{Ozuna}	"Grande"^{Gloria Trevi featuring Mónica Naranjo}	
22 March	"Perdiendo la cabeza"^{Carlos Rivera, Becky G and Pedro Capó}	"Grande"^{Gloria Trevi featuring Mónica Naranjo}	
29 March	"Perdiendo la cabeza"^{Carlos Rivera, Becky G and Pedro Capó}	"Grande"^{Gloria Trevi featuring Mónica Naranjo}	
5 April	"Imposible amor"^{Matisse featuring Guaynaa}	"Grande"^{Gloria Trevi featuring Mónica Naranjo}	
12 April	"Imposible amor"^{Matisse featuring Guaynaa}	"Grande"^{Gloria Trevi featuring Mónica Naranjo}	
19 April	"Imposible amor"^{Matisse featuring Guaynaa}	"Me enamora"^{Mau y Ricky}	
26 April	"Imposible amor"^{Matisse featuring Guaynaa}	"Me enamora"^{Mau y Ricky}	
3 May	"Lo siento mucho"^{Río Roma featuring Thalía}	"Me enamora"^{Mau y Ricky}	
10 May	"Lo siento mucho"^{Río Roma featuring Thalía}	"Me enamora"^{Mau y Ricky}	
17 May	"Favorito"^{Camilo}	"Me enamora"^{Mau y Ricky}	
24 May	"Favorito"^{Camilo}	"Me enamora"^{Mau y Ricky}	
31 May	"Rojo"^{J Balvin}	"Me enamora"^{Mau y Ricky}	
7 June	"ADMV"^{Maluma}	"Me enamora"^{Mau y Ricky}	
14 June	"ADMV"^{Maluma}	"Me enamora"^{Mau y Ricky}	
21 June	"ADMV"^{Maluma}	"Me enamora"^{Mau y Ricky}	
28 June	"SKR"^{Zoé}	"SKR"^{Zoé}	
5 July	"Quiereme mientras se pueda"^{Manuel Turizo}	"SKR"^{Zoé}	
12 July	"SKR"^{Zoé}	"SKR"^{Zoé}	
19 July	"La bella y la bestia"^{Reik featuring Morat}	"Estoy soltera"^{Leslie Shaw featuring Farina and Thalía}	
26 July	"La bella y la bestia"^{Reik featuring Morat}	"Estoy soltera"^{Leslie Shaw featuring Farina and Thalía}	
2 August	"La bella y la bestia"^{Reik featuring Morat}	"Estoy soltera"^{Leslie Shaw featuring Farina and Thalía}	
9 August	"Bajo la mesa"^{Morat featuring Sebastián Yatra}	"Bajo la mesa"^{Morat featuring Sebastián Yatra}	
16 August	"Nada"^{Matisse featuring Chocquibtown}	"Un Día (One Day)"^{J Balvin, Dua Lipa, Bad Bunny and Tainy}	
23 August	"Nada"^{Matisse featuring Chocquibtown}	"Un Día (One Day)"^{J Balvin, Dua Lipa, Bad Bunny and Tainy}	
30 August	"Hawái"^{Maluma}	"Un Día (One Day)"^{J Balvin, Dua Lipa, Bad Bunny and Tainy}	
6 September	"Hawái"^{Maluma}	"Hawái"^{Maluma}	
13 September	"Un Día (One Day)"^{J Balvin, Dua Lipa, Bad Bunny and Tainy}	"Un Día (One Day)"^{J Balvin, Dua Lipa, Bad Bunny and Tainy}	
20 September	"Hawái"^{Maluma}	"Hawái"^{Maluma}	
27 September	"Hawái"^{Maluma}	"Hawái"^{Maluma}	
4 October	"Hawái"^{Maluma}	"Hawái"^{Maluma}	
11 October	"Hawái"^{Maluma}	"Hawái"^{Maluma}	
18 October	"Lo intenté todo"^{Reik featuring Jessie Reyez}	"Hawái"^{Maluma}	
25 October	"Lo intenté todo"^{Reik featuring Jessie Reyez}	"Hawái"^{Maluma}	
1 November	"Vida de rico"^{Camilo}	"Relación (remix)"^{Sech featuring Daddy Yankee, Farruko, J Balvin and Rosalía}	
8 November	"Vida de rico"^{Camilo}	"Vida de rico"^{Camilo}	
15 November	"Karmadame"; Zoé	"Hawái"^{Maluma featuring The Weeknd}	
22 November	"Chica Ideal"; Sebastián Yatra featuring Guaynaa	"Hawái"^{Maluma featuring The Weeknd}	
29 November	"Hawái"^{Maluma featuring The Weeknd}	"Hawái"^{Maluma featuring The Weeknd}	
6 December	"Hawái"^{Maluma featuring The Weeknd}	"Hawái"^{Maluma featuring The Weeknd}	
13 December	"La nota" Manuel Turizo featuring Myke Towers and Rauw Alejandro	"La nota" Manuel Turizo featuring Myke Towers and Rauw Alejandro	
20 December	"Friend de semana"^{Danna Paola featuring Aitana and Luisa Sonza}	"Chica Ideal"; Sebastián Yatra featuring Guaynaa	
27 December	"Un beso en Madrid"; Tini featuring Alejandro Sanz	"Chica Ideal"; Sebastián Yatra featuring Guaynaa	

=== Popular ===
Issue date	Song (Audience)	Song (Spins)	Ref.
5 January	"Escondidos"^{La Adictiva}	"Escondidos"^{La Adictiva}	
12 January	"Escondidos"^{La Adictiva}	"Escondidos"^{La Adictiva}	
19 January	"Escondidos"^{La Adictiva}	"Que Levante la Mano"^{Remmy Valenzuela}	
26 January	"Escondidos"^{La Adictiva}	"Solo tú"^{Calibre 50}	
2 February	"Escondidos"^{La Adictiva}	"Palabra de hombre"^{El fantasma}	
9 February	"Medalla de plata"^{Alfredo Olivas}	"Vanidosa"^{Espinoza Paz}	
16 February	"En un día como hoy"^{Los Plebes del Rancho de Ariel Camacho}	"Palabra de hombre"^{El Fantasma}	
23 February	"Medalla de plata"^{Alfredo Olivas}	"Vanidosa"^{Espinoza Paz}	
1 March	"En un día como hoy"^{Los Plebes del Rancho de Ariel Camacho}	"Mi arrepentimiento"^{Hijos De Barron}	
8 March	"Mi arrepentimiento"^{Hijos De Barron}	"Mi arrepentimiento"^{Hijos De Barron}	
15 March	"Medalla de plata"^{Alfredo Olivas}	"Mi arrepentimiento"^{Hijos De Barron}	
22 March	"Ahora que me acuerdo"^{La Arrolladora Banda El Limón}	"Mi arrepentimiento"^{Hijos De Barron}	
29 March	"Ahora que me acuerdo"^{La Arrolladora Banda El Limón}	"Cuanto a que te olvido"^{Banda Los Sebastianes}	
5 April	"Otra borrachera"^{Gerardo Ortiz}	"Cuanto a que te olvido"^{Banda Los Sebastianes}	
12 April	"Cuanto a que te olvido"^{Banda Los Sebastianes}	"Cuanto a que te olvido"^{Banda Los Sebastianes}	
19 April	"Otra borrachera"^{Gerardo Ortiz}	"Se me olvidó"^{Christian Nodal}	
26 April	"Dile"^{Jary Franco}	"Se me olvidó"^{Christian Nodal}	
3 May	"Se me olvidó"^{Christian Nodal}	"Se me olvidó"^{Christian Nodal}	
10 May	"Se me olvidó"^{Christian Nodal}	"Se me olvidó"^{Christian Nodal}	
17 May	"Se me olvidó"^{Christian Nodal}	"Se me olvidó"^{Christian Nodal}	
24 May	"Ya no vuelvo contigo"^{Lenin Ramírez featuring Grupo Firme}	"Se me olvidó"^{Christian Nodal}	
31 May	"Que sea"^{Joan Sebastian featuring Calibre 50}	"Que sea"^{Joan Sebastian featuring Calibre 50}	
7 June	"Tu y yo"^{Raymix featuring Paulina Rubio}	"Se me olvidó"^{Christian Nodal}	
14 June	"Tu y yo"^{Raymix featuring Paulina Rubio}	"Se me olvidó"^{Christian Nodal}	
21 June	"Tu y yo"^{Raymix featuring Paulina Rubio}	"Barquillero"^{Calibre 50}	
28 June	"Barquillero"^{Calibre 50}	"Barquillero"^{Calibre 50}	
5 July	"5 minutos"^{Grupo Cañaveral}	"Barquillero"^{Calibre 50}	
12 July	"Barquillero"^{Calibre 50}	"Barquillero"^{Calibre 50}	
19 July	"Igual"^{La Arrolladora Banda El Limón}	"Barquillero"^{Calibre 50}	
26 July	"Volverá"^{Alfredo Olivas}	"Aquí abajo"^{Christian Nodal}	
2 August	"Volverá"^{Alfredo Olivas}	"Aquí abajo"^{Christian Nodal}	
9 August	"Aquí abajo"^{Christian Nodal}	"Aquí abajo"^{Christian Nodal}	
16 August	"Aquí abajo"^{Christian Nodal}	"Aquí abajo"^{Christian Nodal}	
23 August	"Aquí abajo"^{Christian Nodal}	"Aquí abajo"^{Christian Nodal}	
30 August	"Aquí abajo"^{Christian Nodal}	"Aquí abajo"^{Christian Nodal}	
6 September	"Hoy tengo miedo"^{Joan Sebastian}	"Aquí abajo"^{Christian Nodal}	
13 September	"Aquí abajo"^{Christian Nodal}	"Aquí abajo"^{Christian Nodal}	
20 September	"Te quise olvidar"^{El Bebeto}	"Aquí abajo"^{Christian Nodal}	
27 September	"Lo que nunca será"^{La Adictiva}	"Aquí abajo"^{Christian Nodal}	
4 October	"Decepciones"^{Alejandro Fernández featuring Calibre 50}	"Lo que nunca será"^{La Adictiva}	
11 October	"Lo que tu necesitas"^{Alex Fernández}	"Ya no quiero andar contigo"^{Joss Favela}	
18 October	"Ya no quiero andar contigo"^{Joss Favela}	"Ya no quiero andar contigo"^{Joss Favela}	
25 October	"Ya no insistas corazón"^{Vicente Fernández}	"Ya no quiero andar contigo"^{Joss Favela}	
1 November	"Que se sepa nuestro amor"^{Mon Laferte featuring Alejandro Fernández}	"Ya no quiero andar contigo"^{Joss Favela}	
8 November	"Ya no quiero andar contigo"^{Joss Favela}	"Ya no quiero andar contigo"^{Joss Favela}	
15 November	"Llámame"^{Raymix}	"Ya no quiero andar contigo"^{Joss Favela}	
22 November	"Me voy a ir"^{Banda Los Sebastianes}	"Ya no quiero andar contigo"^{Joss Favela}	
29 November	"Te volvería a elegir"^{Calibre 50}	"Dime como quieres"^{Christian Nodal featuring Angela Aguilar}	
6 December	"Dime como quieres"^{Christian Nodal featuring Angela Aguilar}	"Dime como quieres"^{Christian Nodal featuring Angela Aguilar}	
13 December	"Dime como quieres"^{Christian Nodal featuring Angela Aguilar}	"Dime como quieres"^{Christian Nodal featuring Angela Aguilar}	
20 December	"Dime como quieres"^{Christian Nodal featuring Angela Aguilar}	"Dime como quieres"^{Christian Nodal featuring Angela Aguilar}	
27 December	"Dime como quieres"^{Christian Nodal featuring Angela Aguilar}	"Dime como quieres"^{Christian Nodal featuring Angela Aguilar}	

=== Anglo ===
Issue date	Song (Audience)	Song (Spins)	Ref.
5 January	"Dance Monkey"^{Tones and I}	"Dance Monkey"^{Tones and I}	
12 January	"Dance Monkey"^{Tones and I}	"Dance Monkey"^{Tones and I}	
13 January	"Dance Monkey"^{Tones and I}	"Dance Monkey"^{Tones and I}	
26 January	"Dance Monkey"^{Tones and I}	"Dance Monkey"^{Tones and I}	
2 February	"Dance Monkey"^{Tones and I}	"Dance Monkey"^{Tones and I}	
9 February	"Dance Monkey"^{Tones and I}	"Dance Monkey"^{Tones and I}	
16 February	"Dance Monkey"^{Tones and I}	"Dance Monkey"^{Tones and I}	
23 February	"Blinding Lights"^{The Weeknd}	"Dance Monkey"^{Tones and I}	
1 March	"Dance Monkey^{Tones and I}	"Dance Monkey"^{Tones and I}	
8 March	"Blinding Lights"^{The Weeknd}	"Dance Monkey"^{Tones and I}	
15 March	"Blinding Lights"^{The Weeknd}	"Dance Monkey"^{Tones and I}	
22 March	"Blinding Lights"^{The Weeknd}	"Blinding Lights"^{The Weeknd}	
29 March	"Blinding Lights"^{The Weeknd}	"Blinding Lights"^{The Weeknd}	
5 April	"Blinding Lights"^{The Weeknd}	"Blinding Lights"^{The Weeknd}	
12 April	"Say So"^{Doja Cat}	"Say So"^{Doja Cat}	
19 April	"Say So"^{Doja Cat}	"Say So"^{Doja Cat}	
26 April	"Say So"^{Doja Cat}	"Say So"^{Doja Cat}	
3 May	"Blinding Lights"^{The Weeknd}	"Blinding Lights"^{The Weeknd}	
10 May	"Blinding Lights"^{The Weeknd}	"Blinding Lights"^{The Weeknd}	
17 May	"Say So"^{Doja Cat}	"Say So"^{Doja Cat}	
24 May	"Say So"^{Doja Cat}	"Say So"^{Doja Cat}	
31 May	"Say So"^{Doja Cat}	"Say So"^{Doja Cat}	
7 June	"Say So"^{Doja Cat}	"Say So"^{Doja Cat}	
14 June	"Say So"^{Doja Cat}	"Say So"^{Doja Cat}	
21 June	"Say So"^{Doja Cat}	"Say So"^{Doja Cat}	
28 June	"Rain on Me"^{Lady Gaga featuring Ariana Grande}	"Rain On Me"^{Lady Gaga featuring Ariana Grande}	
5 July	"Banana"^{Conkarah featuring DJ Fle and Shaggy}	"Say So"^{Doja Cat}	
12 July	"Banana"^{Conkarah featuring DJ Fle and Shaggy}	"Rain On Me"^{Lady Gaga featuring Ariana Grande}	
19 July	"Watermelon Sugar"^{Harry Styles}	"Watermelon Sugar"^{Harry Styles}	
26 July	"Banana"^{Conkarah featuring DJ Fle and Shaggy}	"Watermelon Sugar"^{Harry Styles}	
2 August	"Banana"^{Conkarah featuring DJ Fle and Shaggy}	"Banana"^{Conkarah featuring DJ Fle and Shaggy}	
9 August	"Banana"^{Conkarah featuring DJ Fle and Shaggy}	"Watermelon Sugar"^{Harry Styles}	
16 August	"Watermelon Sugar"^{Harry Styles}	"Watermelon Sugar"^{Harry Styles}	
23 August	"Savage Love (Laxed – Siren Beat)"^{Jawsh 685 featuring Jason Derulo}	"Savage Love (Laxed – Siren Beat)"^{Jawsh 685 featuring Jason Derulo}	
30 August	"Savage Love (Laxed – Siren Beat)"^{Jawsh 685 featuring Jason Derulo}	"Watermelon Sugar"^{Harry Styles}	
6 September	"Savage Love (Laxed – Siren Beat)"^{Jawsh 685 featuring Jason Derulo}	"Savage Love (Laxed – Siren Beat)"^{Jawsh 685 featuring Jason Derulo}	
13 September	"Dynamite"^{BTS}	"Savage Love (Laxed – Siren Beat)"^{Jawsh 685 featuring Jason Derulo}	
20 September	"Dynamite"^{BTS}	"Savage Love (Laxed – Siren Beat)"^{Jawsh 685 featuring Jason Derulo}	
27 September	"Dynamite"^{BTS}	"Dynamite"^{BTS}	
4 October	"Dynamite"^{BTS}	"Dynamite"^{BTS}	
11 October	"Dynamite"^{BTS}	"Dynamite"^{BTS}	
18 October	"Dynamite"^{BTS}	"Dynamite"^{BTS}	
25 October	"Dynamite"^{BTS}	"Dynamite"^{BTS}	
1 November	"Dynamite"^{BTS}	"Dynamite"^{BTS}	
8 November	"Dynamite"^{BTS}	"Dynamite"^{BTS}	
15 November	"Dynamite"^{BTS}	"Dynamite"^{BTS}	
22 November	"Let´s Love"^{David Guetta featuring Sia}	"Dynamite"^{BTS}	
29 November	"Golden"^{Harry Styles}	"Dynamite"^{BTS}	
6 December	"Golden"^{Harry Styles}	"Dynamite"^{BTS}	
13 December	"Golden"^{Harry Styles}	"Dynamite"^{BTS}	
20 December	"Golden"^{Harry Styles}	"Positions"^{Ariana Grande}	
27 December	"Golden"^{Harry Styles}	"Golden"^{Harry Styles}	

== Chart history (streaming) ==
Issue date	Song	Artist(s)	Ref.
January 2	"Tusa"	Karol G featuring Nicki Minaj	
January 9	"Tusa"	Karol G featuring Nicki Minaj	
January 16	"Tusa"	Karol G featuring Nicki Minaj	
January 23	"Tusa"	Karol G featuring Nicki Minaj	
January 30	"Tusa"	Karol G featuring Nicki Minaj	
February 6	"Tusa"	Karol G featuring Nicki Minaj	
February 13	"Tusa"	Karol G featuring Nicki Minaj	
February 20	"Tusa"	Karol G featuring Nicki Minaj	
February 27	"Tusa"	Karol G featuring Nicki Minaj	
March 5	"Si veo a tu mamá"	Bad Bunny	
March 12	"Si veo a tu mamá"	Bad Bunny	
March 19	"Safaera"	Bad Bunny featuring Ñengo Flow and Jowell & Randy	
March 26	"Safaera"	Bad Bunny featuring Ñengo Flow and Jowell & Randy	
April 2	"Safaera"	Bad Bunny featuring Ñengo Flow and Jowell & Randy	
April 9	"Safaera"	Bad Bunny featuring Ñengo Flow and Jowell & Randy	
April 16	"Safaera"	Bad Bunny featuring Ñengo Flow and Jowell & Randy	
April 23	"Safaera"	Bad Bunny featuring Ñengo Flow and Jowell & Randy	
April 30	"Safaera"	Bad Bunny featuring Ñengo Flow and Jowell & Randy	
May 7	"Que maldición"	Banda MS de Sergio Lizárraga featuring Snoop Dogg	
May 14	"Safaera"	Bad Bunny featuring Ñengo Flow and Jowell & Randy	
May 21	"Safaera"	Bad Bunny featuring Ñengo Flow and Jowell & Randy	
May 28	"Safaera"	Bad Bunny featuring Ñengo Flow and Jowell & Randy	
June 4	"Safaera"	Bad Bunny featuring Ñengo Flow and Jowell & Randy	
June 11	"Safaera"	Bad Bunny featuring Ñengo Flow and Jowell & Randy	
June 18	"Azul"	J Balvin	
June 25	"Azul"	J Balvin	
July 2	"Relación"	Sech	
July 9	"La Jeepeta"	Nio Garcia featuring Anuel AA and Myke Towers	
July 16	"La Jeepeta"	Nio Garcia featuring Anuel AA and Myke Towers	
July 23	"La Jeepeta"	Nio Garcia featuring Anuel AA and Myke Towers	
July 30	"La Jeepeta"	Nio Garcia featuring Anuel AA and Myke Towers	
August 6	"La Jeepeta"	Nio Garcia featuring Anuel AA and Myke Towers	
August 13	"La Jeepeta"	Nio Garcia featuring Anuel AA and Myke Towers	
August 20	"Hawái"	Maluma	
August 27	"Hawái"	Maluma	
September 3	"Hawái"	Maluma	
September 10	"Hawái"	Maluma	
September 17	"Hawái"	Maluma	
September 24	"Hawái"	Maluma	
October 1	"Hawái"	Maluma	
October 8	"Hawái"	Maluma	
October 15	"Hawái"	Maluma	
October 22	"Hawái"	Maluma	
October 29	"Hawái"	Maluma	
November 5	"Dákiti"	Bad Bunny	
November 12	"Dákiti"	Bad Bunny	
November 19	"Dákiti"	Bad Bunny	
November 26	"Dákiti"	Bad Bunny	
December 3	"Dákiti"	Bad Bunny	
December 10	"Dákiti"	Bad Bunny	
December 17	"Dákiti"	Bad Bunny	
December 24	"Dákiti"	Bad Bunny	
December 31	"Dákiti"	Bad Bunny	

== See also ==
- List of number-one albums of 2020 (Mexico)
