= List of Polymarchs albums under Musart =

The following is a list of albums mixed by Mexican DJ group Polymarchs and released on the Musart label. The first eight volumes of the series are High Energy tracks. From 1992 onward, the compilations are Electronica. Tony Barrera DJ mixed all Polymarchs compilations prior to "Polymarchs 99" with the exception of Volumes 4 and 5 (which was mixed by J.F. Rangel). All posthumous albums were mixed by Victor Estrella.

== VOL. 1 ==
Released 1984
Format: LP
Mixed by: Tony Barrera

- "And Dance" - Billy Preston
- "Trouble In Paradise" - Sylvester
- "Desire" - Paul Parker
- "You've Got to Move It On" - Rofo
- "Let's Break" - Master Genius
- "Love Reaction" - Divine
- "I Love Men" - Cinema
- "Love Rocket" - Celi Bee
- "Somebody to Love" - Cafe Society
- "Lucky Tonight" - Sarah Dash
- "Looking Out" - Oh Romeo
- "Beeline" - Miquel Brown
- "High Energy" - Evelyn Thomas

== VOL. 2 ==
Released 1985
Format: LP
Mixed by: Tony Barrera

Side A

- "Relight My Fire" - Cafe Society
- "I'm So Beautiful" - Divine
- "Walk Like a Man" - Divine
- "Strange Desire" - Nicci Gable
- "Invitation" - Life Force
- "Time Bomb" - Jeanie Tracy

Side B

- "Thunder and Lightning" - Heat-x-change
- "High Sex Drive" - Dolmann
- "Dance Party" - Blue Lazer
- "Keep Dancin'" - Touch Of Class
- "Chinese Eyes" - Fancy

== VOL. 3 ==
Released 1985
Format: LP
Mixed by: Tony Barrera

- "Unexpected Lovers" - Lime
- "Nobody's Stopping You" - Peter Batah & Lime
- "Eat You Up" - Angie Gold
- "Remembering Love" - Tiffany
- "Fighting For Our Lives" - Shiraz

== VOL. 4 ==
Released 1985
Format: LP
Mixed by: J.F. Rangel

- "Sex" - Sylvester
- "Don't Leave Me This Way" - Jeanie Tracy
- "Runaway (With My Love)" - Tapps
- "Harmony" - Suzy Q.
- "Turbo Diesel" - Albert One

== VOL. 5 ==
Released 1986
Format: LP
Mixed by: J.F. Rangel

- "Lovin' Is Really My Game" - Sylvester
- "One Shot Lover" - Venus
- "Midnight Lover" - People Like Us
- "Casanova Action" - Latin Hearts/Latin Lovers
- "Saving Myself (For the One that I Love)" - Oh Romeo
- "From a Whisper to a Scream" - Bobby O and Claudja Barry

== VOL. 6 ==
Released 1986
Format: LP
Mixed by: Tony Barrera

- "Tonight" - Ken Laszlo
- "Voulez-Vous" - The Flirts
- "Wake Up" - Stop
- "Starstruck Lover" - Boiling Point
- "I Love My Radio (Midnight Radio)" - Taffy

== VOL. 7 ==
Released 1987
Format: LP
Mixed by: Tony Barrera

- "Rendezvous" - Stop
- "The Night" - Shezoray
- "Fire" - Linda
- "Fantasy" - Bonaventura
- "Miss Liberty" - John Sauli

== VOL. 8 ==
Released 1988
Format: LP
Mixed by: Tony Barrera

- "Two of Hearts" - Bobby Hood and the Much More
- "Love Take Me High" - Frank Loverde
- "Friday Night" - Sabby Rayas
- "One More Time" - Bianca

== Giantes Del High Energy Vol. 1 ==
Released 1987
Format: LP
Mixed by: Tony Barrera

Side A: Primer Mix Ensename

- "Show Me" - San
- "Duri Duri" - Click
- "Deeper N Deeper" - Modern Rocketry
- "I Feel Love Coming" - Modern Rocketry
- "Three Times Lover" - Bardeux
- "My Heart's On Fire" - Patrick L. Myers
- "Bubble Gum Love" - Trisha

Side B: Segundo Mix No Tengo Tiempo

- "So Many Men, So Little Time" - Miquel Brown
- "One Look" - Jackson Moore
- "Be My Delight" - Amante
- "Dance Your Love Away" - Michael Prince
- "Wild Thing" - Nick John
- "One Shot, So Hot" - Michael Bow
- "Three Times Lover (Reprise)" - Bardeaux

== Gigantes Del High Energy Vol. 2 ==
Released 1987
Format: LP
Mixed by: Tony Barrera

Side A: Tercer Mix Sin Parar

- "Can't Stop" - Below Zero
- "Que Te Pasa" - Click
- "Wake Up '88" - Stop
- "Ready Or Not" - Hotline
- "Rofo's Theme" - Rofo
- "Lust Or Love" - Malibu
- "Money" - Mozzart

Side B: Cuatro Mix Corre Hacia Mi

- "Run To Me" - Tony Caso
- "Born To Be Wild" - Jo-Carol & Modern Rocketry
- "Alto Y Peligroso" - Click
- "Keep It Coming" - Boyd Brothers
- "Beatsky Mix" - The Smalltown Boys
- "Bad Love" - Emergency

== Disco de Oro Vol. 1 ==
Released 1989
Format: LP
Mixed by: Tony Barrera

Side 1

- "Gimme The Love" - Kinky Go
- "Crazy For You" - Desire feat. Rae Flores
- "Samba" - Johnny Chingas
- "The Night" - Shezoray
- "Casanova Action" - Latin Lovers/Latin Hearts
- "Dance Your Love Away" - Michael Prince
- "Wake Up" - Stop

Side 2

- "Mirage" - Scotch
- "La Bamba" - Tierra
- "O La La" - Finzy Kontini
- "Come and Dance Ahora" - Stop
- "Dancing in My Sleep" - Secret Ties

== Disco de Oro Vol. 2 ==
Released 1989
Format: LP
Mixed by: Tony Barrera

Side 1

- "Born to be Wild" - Jo Carol & Modern Rocketry
- "I Cry For You" - Shy Rose
- "Money" - Mozzart
- "I Feel Love Coming" - Modern Rocketry
- "Love Obsession" - Bent Passion
- "Deeper and Deeper" - Modern Rocketry
- "Three Times Lover" - Bardeux
- "Desire" - Centron
- "Humpty Dumpty" - Rainbow
- "Duri Duri" - Click

Side 2

- "Playing With Love" - Chapter One
- "Thief in the Nite" - Charlotte McKinnon
- "Meet My Friend" - Eddy Huntington
- "Boom Baam" - Mannequin
- "Freak it Out, Freak it In" - Michael Bow
- "One Shot, So Hot" - Michael Bow
- "Lay it On the Line" - Elaine Charles
- "Americano" - Click
- "Alto y Peligroso" - Click

== Polymarchs 92 ==
Released 1991
Format: CD
Mixed by: Tony Barrera

=== Techno Mix ===
- "Asi Me Gusta A Mi" - Tony B
- "Energetic Mix" - Raf
- "Quadrophonia" - Quadrophonia
- "Rave the Rhythm" - Channel X
- "Le Dormeur" - Pleasure Game
- "In the Evening" - Tragic Error
- "Get Ready 4 This" - 2 Unlimited
- "James Brown Is Dead" - L.A. Style

=== Rap Mix ===
- "Rap De Polymarchs" - Tony B.
- "Everybody's Free" - Rozalla
- "Feel the Groove" - Cartouche
- "Rap Around the World" - T.O.T.B.
- "Rap De Polymarchs" - Tony Barrera

== Polymarchs 93 ==
Released 1992
Format: CD
Mixed by: Tony Barrera

=== Hard Core Mix ===
- "Me Exitas" - Tony Barrera
- "Huga Chaka" - Tribal Force
- "Oink" - De Roze Smoeltjes
- "Criminal Mind" - The Criminal Mind
- "El Punto Final" - Final Analysis
- "Hocus Pocus" - Vicious Delicious
- "Miguel Son Mi" - Pedrito
- "Can Can" - Can Can Gang

=== Techno Industrial Mix ===
- "No Limit" - 2 Unlimited
- "Dildo" - Interactive
- "Hei Tu" - Magic Domingo
- "Expansion" - Control Expansion D.J.P.C.
- "Like Like This" - No Problems
- "Wurstel Tanze" - LZ 92

=== Rock Pop Mix ===
- "With Or Without You" - Double You
- "If You Leave Me Now" - C.C. Peter
- "Ritmo De La Noche" - Mystic
- "Send Me An Angel" - Cyber Funk

== Polymarchs 95 ==
Released 1994
Format: CD
Mixed by: Tony Barrera

=== Hip-Hop Dance Mix ===
- "Chiki Chika" - X-Cite
- "Chiquetere" - Rafa Villalba & DJ Sarna
- "I'd Do Anything 4 Love" - Jam Tronik
- "Eddy Steady Go (Unity Power Edit)" - Rozlyne Clarke
- "U Got 2 Let the Music" - Cappella
- "Bip-Bop" - Tony B.
- "Mr. Vain" - Club Beat ft. Marquise

=== Techno House Mix ===
- "The Rhythm Of The Night" - Corona
- "Think About The Way" - Ice Mc ft. Alexia
- "Get-A-Way" - Maxx
- "Dance To The Beat" - Solid Base
- "What's Up? (Hi-Speed Version)" - Cover Girls
- "Esta Pega'o" - Proyecto Uno

This album was recalled in the mid 1990s because of licensing issues. Newer versions of the album do not contain "Esta Pega'o" by Proyecto Uno.

=== Ultra Mix-Techno-High ===
- "Pessa Pessa" - Masoko Solo
- "Asako" - Lethal
- "Mira Como Apestas" - Teste Sciroppate
- "No More (I Can't Stand It)" - Maxx
- "Midijump" - Proud & Mary
- "Give Love" - Genius Force
- "Vamonos!" - Tridimensional
- "Sube, Sube" - Marchin
- "Russians" - K.R.B.
- "A Pitar" - DJ Roman
- "Al Bote" - Ciber Country Sound
- "Me Exitas" - Tony Barrera

== Polymarchs 96 ==
Released 1995
Format: CD
Mixed by: Tony Barrera

=== Imperio Mix ===
- "Introduction" - Imperio
- "Try Me Out" - Corona
- "The Rhythm" - B-One
- "Do What's Good For Me" - 2 Unlimited
- "All My Life" - X-Pose
- "It's A Rainy Day" - Ice Mc
- "Baby Baby" - Corona

=== Ramses Mix ===
- "Boom Chaka" - Dagon
- "Groovy Beat" - JLM
- "All Right" - Double Vision
- "Telescopic Probe" - Endorian
- "You Got To Be There" - Kadoc
- "Alfa" - Shuilem

=== Tutankamon Mix ===
- "El Ritmo Rapido" - Barabba
- "Deutsch Bass" - Station 27
- "Electronic Brain" - Icon
- "Hey-A-Wa" - Aldus Haza
- "No Hagas El Indo, Haz El Cherokee" - Cherry Coke

=== Amenofis Mix ===
- "Dancing With An Angel" - Double You
- "Subconscious" - B.P.M. System
- "Vamos Al Espacio Exterior" - Chimo Bayo
- "Sonic Trip" - R. Gallery
- "Master Animation" - Egg Situation
- "Obscuridad" - Tony Barrera

== Polymarchs 97 ==
Released 1996
Format: CD
Mixed by: Tony Barrera

=== Fast Dance Mix ===
- "Ooo-La-La-La" - Justine Earp
- "Dabadabiaboo" - Bizz Nizz ft. George Arrendell
- "Me Lay Lo" - D.F.S.
- "Magic Carpet Ride" - Mighty Dub Katz
- "Get Up And Boogie" - Corona
- "Let Me See Yamove" - T.C.

=== Total Move On Mix ===
- "Move Your Body" - Unlimited Nation
- "Summer Is Crazy" - Alexia
- "The Night Is Magic" - Imperio
- "Here I Come" - Captain G.Q.
- "Move Your Body" - Detune
- "Shake Shake Baby Love" - Samtronix
- "King Kong Five" - State 37

=== Androbeat (Performance Mix) ===
- "The Nighttrain" - Kadoc
- "Da Teknogroove" - Kike Boy
- "Muzik (Kike Boy Remix)" - Loopmania
- "Get Up And Jam" - K-TA-K
- "Work That Saturday Jam" - Kalou DJ's
- "I Like Sex" - L.A. Work

=== Backtrax 970's ===
- "It's A Shame" - B-One
- "Step Right Back" - Mezzoforte
- "Rap All Chant" - Mecanic MC's
- "I Don't Wanna Be A Star" - Corona
- "My Radio" - J.K.
- "Funky Town" - Lia

== Polymarchs 98 ==
Released 1997
Format: CD
Mixed by: Tony Barrera

=== Automatic Dance Mix ===
- "Oh La La La" - 2 Eivissa
- "Summer Of Love" - Ondina
- "Uh La La La" - Alexia
- "Encore Une Fois" - Sash!
- "Je T'Aime (A La Folie)" - 2 Lips
- "Looking For My Baby" - Alexia

=== Interactive Mix ===
- "Amour (C'Mon)" - Porn Kings
- "I'm Your Destiny" - Snazzy
- "Dominating" - C. Mania
- "Rock The Bells" - Kadoc
- "Work It Out" - Joan Robinson
- "House Time Is Anytime" - H.H. System
- "Get Ready" - Brainbox

=== Future Rhythm Mix ===
- "Lift Me Up" - Red 5
- "I Wanna Make You..." - Sequential One
- "Give Me Attitude" - Reactor Project
- "Da Lower You Go" - Striking Man
- "Outthere" - Roef
- "I'll Be Good" - Firecracker

=== Latin Samba Mix ===
- "La Gringa" - VIP ft. Joshua
- "Chica Bonita (Levante Las Manos)" - Artie The 1 Man Party
- "Al ritmo de La Noche" - Tony barrera
- "Zumba" - Artie The 1 Man Party
- "Carrilio De Manha" - Carrilio
- "Ecuador" - Sash!
- "Carneval En Rio" - Carrilio
- "Mami" - Artie The 1 Man Party
- "Te Necesito Baby" - Tony Barrera

== Polymarchs 99 ==
Released 1998
Format: CD
Mixed by: Victor Estrella

This album was released after the death of Tony B. As a tribute, the cover art portrays him as a Pharaoh.

=== House Mix ===
- "Horny 98" - Mousse T.
- "All Night Long" - Flickman
- "Free" - Ultra Nate
- "Move Your Body" - 2 Eivissa
- "Wanna Get Up" - 2 Unlimited
- "Girls Just Wanna Have Fun" - Happy Nation
- "Ma Baker" - DJ Alvin
- "I Want You Girl" - Fast Eddie
- "Dream For Reality" - Flickman
- "Discohopping" - Klubbheads
- "Get Up And Boogie" - Bizz Nizz

=== Devil Mix ===
- "Check It Out" - Zycro Meets DJ Silencer
- "Amokk" - 666
- "I Can't Hear You" - Caater
- "Dallas" - J.R.'s Revenge
- "I Love Elvis Presley" - After Hour
- "The Squeeler" - Pat Jam
- "Alarma" - 666
- "Diablo" - 666
- "Like A Monkey" - NRGY
- "Formula" - DJ Visage
- "Crazy" - Ultra Max

=== Bass Mix ===
- "We Want Some Pussy" - Jason Nevins vs. The Krew
- "The Funk Phenomena" - Armand Van Helden
- "Kickin' In The Beat" - Porn Kings vs. Pamela Fernandez
- "It's Like That" - Rappers Mix
- "Shout!" - Clubbastards
- "Badda Bing Badda Boom" - Big Bass
- "Dirty Disco Dubs (Stamp Your Feet)" - DJ Disco
- "Pumped Up Funk" - Itybitty, Boozywoozy, & Greatski
- "Clap Your Hands" - Kadoc
- "Space The Base" - Two Phunky People
- "Knockin' (RMX 2000)" - Double Vision
- "Da Bass" - DJ Red 5

=== Maquina Mix ===
- "One, Two, Three" - B.P.M. System
- "D-Sorden" - Techni-kl
- "We Are Here Today" - In Time
- "Don't Stop The Moby" - Techni-kl
- "Rave Party" - DJ Roy
- "Back To The Stile" - Techni-kl
- "Radical" - D-Project
- "Al Ritmo De La Noche" - Tony Barrera

== Polymarchs: Tony Barrera: 1963 - 1998 ==
Released 1998
Format: CD
The first six tracks were written by Tony B and Allan Coelho, "Asi Me Gusta A Mi" is written by Chimo Bayo and the last track is co-written with Chimo Bayo and Tony B

- "Te Necesito Baby (Radio Mix)" - Tony Barrera
- "Te Necesito Baby (Extended Mix)" - Tony Barrera
- "Al Ritmo De La Noche (Radio Mix)" - Tony Barrera
- "Al Ritmo De La Noche (Extended Mix)" - Tony Barrera
- "Me Exitas" - Tony Barrera
- "Obscuridad" - Tony Barrera
- "Asi Me Gusta A Mi" - Tony Barrera
- "Rap De Polymarchs" - Tony Barrera

== Polymarchs Millenium ==
Released 1999
Format: CD
Mixed by: Victor Estrella

=== Vengamania Mix ===
- "Two Times" - Ann Lee
- "We Like To Party" - Vengaboys
- "Boom, Boom, Boom, Boom !!" - Vengaboys
- "Rosamunda" - Speck ft. Danny Chunga
- "Everybody Jump!" - Anti-Funky
- "Bow" - DJ V.E.
- "Time" - The Groove

=== Millennium Mix ===
- "Boogie Woogie (Dancing Shoes)" - Wordy Club
- "Fresh (All Night Long)" - Strawberry Flavour
- "Spank! Spank!" - Jaydee vs. Bo Horne
- "Tropical Paradise" - Poco Loco Gang
- "Let's Go To The Party" - Poco Loco Gang
- "To Brazil" - Vengaboys

=== Pop House Mix ===
- "Blue (Da Ba Dee)" - Eiffel 65
- "Going Down To Cuba" - Poco Loco Gang
- "Two Times" - Ann Lee
- "We're Going To Ibiza" - Vengaboys
- "Delicious" - T-Spoon
- "Never Surrender" - 2 Unlimited
- "Magic Of Summer" - Zar Dynasty

=== Euro Kick Mix ===
- "Kickin' Hard" - Klubbheads
- "Citizen" - DJ Roy
- "Reach To The Top" - DJ Disco
- "Let's Dance" - DJ Disco
- "The Launch" - DJ Jean
- "Honey, Ride This!" - Club Robbers
- "Bomba!" - 666

== Polymarchs 01 ==
Released 2000
Format: CD
Mixed by: Victor Estrella

=== Euro Mix ===
- "My Heart Goes Boom (La Di Da Da)" - DJ France
- "Eeah Dada" - La Bionda
- "Kiss (When The Sun Don't Shine)" - Vengaboys
- "Welcome" - Mike Ski
- "Hands Up (Fergie and BK Mix)" - Trevor & Simon
- "Yo Deejay" - Anti-Funky
- "The Cavalry (Face Down Ass Up)" - Cisco Kid

=== Alice Mix ===
- "Everyday" - Systematic
- "Everybody Get Up" - Double X Voice
- "I Wanna Be Free" - Mumm vs. Dhany
- "I Can See (See It In Your Eyes)" - Alice Deejay
- "Higher & Higher" - DJ Jurgen

=== Performance Mix ===
- "Sexlife" - Club Caviar
- "Hand's Up! (DJ Jean Mix)" - Trevor & Simon
- "The Disclubber" - Enrico
- "Piano 2000" - B.O.B. LTD.
- "Don't Let Go" - Head Norny's
- "Injected With The Sound" - DJ Peter G. vs. B.O.B. LTD.

=== Electronic Mix ===
- "Kernkraft 400" - Zombie Nation
- "Radioaktiv" - Das Atom
- "Listen To That Fat Bass 2000" - DJ Loving Loop
- "Get Up (Ahh Da Boy Tommy's Jump Cut)" - Drive By Shooters
