= Nick Pride and the Pimptones =

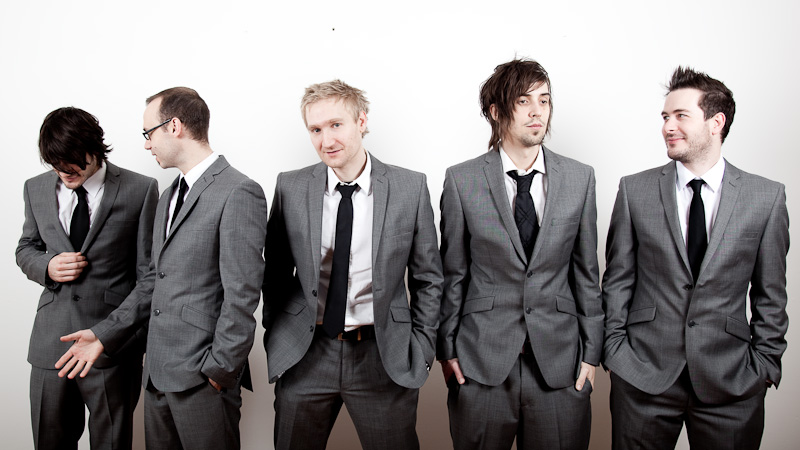
- Nick Pride and the Pimptones in 2011

Background information
- Origin: Newcastle upon Tyne, United Kingdom
- Genres: Funk; jazz; soul; hip-hop
- Years active: 2007–present
- Labels: Légère Recordings; Record Kicks; Wack; Jazz Girl
- Members: Nick Pride; Keith Nicholson; Alex Saxon; Eliza Lawson; Jimmy Brown; Pete Lawson
- Past members: Oscar Cassidy; Ian 'dodge' Paterson; Dave Wilde; Alex Leathard; Tom Quilliam; Beth Macari
- Website: Nick Pride and the Pimptones on Facebook

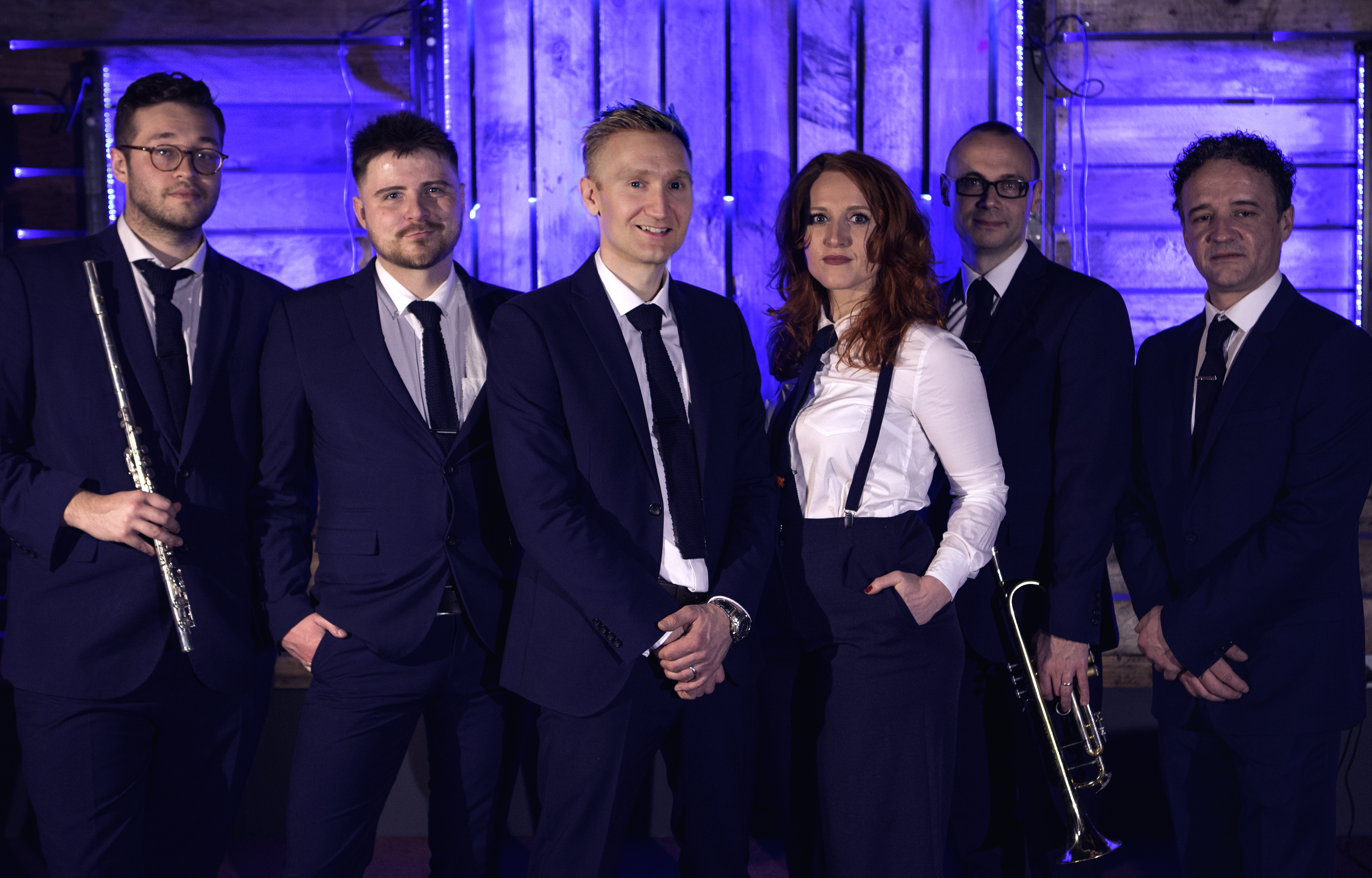
Nick Pride & The Pimptones in 2018

Nick Pride and the Pimptones are a funk/jazz/soul band based in Newcastle upon Tyne. The Pimptones were formed in 2007 by guitarist, composer, and arranger Nick Pride. Their record label Record Kicks describes them as "a deep funk/jazz-dance outfit playing original music in the style of The Meters, JTQ, and Charlie Hunter. "

== Career ==
=== It's the Pimptones ===
In the original line-up, Pride was joined by Oscar Cassidy (drums), Ian 'dodge' Paterson (bass guitar), Dave Wilde (saxophone and flute), and Alex Leathard (trombone). This first incarnation of the band can be heard on the band's debut release, It’s the Pimptones (Jazz Girl Records).

In 2009, the band released the 7" single "Deeper Pimp" on Wack Records, which received radioplay across Europe, including on the The Craig Charles Funk and Soul Show on BBC 6. The success of the single brought live performance opportunities the North-East of England, supporting bands including Maceo Parker, Candi Staton, Youngblood Brass Band and Hot 8 Brass Band.

=== Midnight Feast of Jazz ===
The band was later joined by a new horn section line-up (Keith Nicholson and Tomas Quilliam). The 2011 single "Waitin' So Long" featured Jess Roberts, and the album Midnight Feast of Jazz featured Roberts as well as Susan Hamilton and Zoe Gilby. Basic Soul said the album was "a very strong debut by Nick Pride here that you can dance to or just sit back and groove to".

=== Re-juiced Phat Shake ===
The Pimptones third studio album, Re-juiced Phat Shake, was released on Legere Recordings on 14 February 2014 and featured more guest singers. Basic Soul called it "an album filled with soulfully deep and satisfying recordings that are light on filler, yet heavy on grooves to keep your body shaking to the beat".

At that time, John Waugh replaced Tomas Quilliam as the band's sax player.

=== Go Deep ===
With the departure of John Waugh (sax) to join The 1975, both Alex Saxon (sax) and Beth Macari (vocals) were brought in to join the band. The result was the album Go Deep, recorded live in Newcastle upon Tyne in August 2015 at Loft Studios, and released on Légère Recordings in June 2016.

== Live performances / airplay ==
The group has played in many UK venues known for hosting funk bands, including the 100 Club, The Yardbird in Birmingham, Band on The Wall in Manchester, Hi-Fi Club in Leeds, the Jazzbar in Edinburgh, as well as festivals such as The Mostly Jazz Festival, The North East Funk and Soul Revue, and The Sage Gateshead International Jazz Festival.

Internationally they have played at the Imagina Funk Festival (2015), Novara Jazz Festival (2012) and Swingin' Groningen (2012) along with various gigs in Italy and Spain.

Nick Pride hosts a Pimptones podcast centered on the band as well as other artists in the North East England area.

== Band members ==
The current line-up for Nick Pride and the Pimptones is as follows:

- Nick Pride - guitar, vocals, songwriter
- Pete Lawson - drums
- Jimmy Brown - electric bass
- Keith Nicholson - trumpet / flugel
- Alex Saxon - saxophone / flute
- Eliza Lawson - vocals

=== Discography ===
Albums

- It's The Pimptones!!!!!!! (2009 - Jazz Girl Records)
- Midnight Feast of Jazz (2011 - Record Kicks)
- Remixed Feast of Jazz (2012 - Record Kicks)
- Rejuiced Phat Shake (2014 - Légère Recordings)
- Old School Studios Live Session (Unofficial FREE D/L 2015)
- The Bootleg Project (Unofficial FREE D/L 2015)
- Go Deep (2016 - Légère Recordings)

Singles

- "Deeper Pimp" (2009 - Wack Records)
- "Lay It on the Line" (2011 - Record Kicks)
- "Waitin' So Long" feat Jess Roberts (2011 - Record Kicks)
- "Unfinished Sympathy" 7" (2012 - Badass 45s)
- "Take Care of My Love" (2013 - Légère Recordings )
- "Shimmy" / "Honey" 7" (2013 - Badass 45s)
- "Why Does My Man" (2015 - Légère Recordings)
- "Gotta Leave The Lady Alone" / "Baby Can We Start Again" (2016 - Légère Recordings)

Compilations

- Smoove Presents Mo' Record Kicks (2011 - Record Kicks)
- VA Record Kicks 10 Compilation (2013 - Record Kicks)
- Craig Charles Funk And Soul Classics (2015 - Sony Music TV Comp)
