= Chico Che =

Mexican singer and composer (1945–1989)

- Born: Francisco José Hernández Mandujano; December 7, 1945; Villahermosa, Tabasco, Mexico
- Died: March 29, 1989 (aged 43); Mexico City, Mexico
- Occupations: Musician; Singer; Performer
- Known for: Chico Che y La Crisis

Francisco José Hernández Mandujano (December 7, 1945 – March 29, 1989), better known as Chico Che, was a musician, singer, songwriter, and performer from Villahermosa, Tabasco, Mexico.

Born in 1945, Chico Che was the youngest of three. Though he never received formal training, he mastered the guitar and numerous other instruments. Throughout his career, he founded several notable groups including Los 7 Modernistas, Los Temerarios, and La Crisis. Among his hit songs were "De Quén Chon" and "Quién Pompó".

On March 29, 1989, Chico Che died of a stroke at his home in Mexico City at the age of 43.

== Discography ==
- Paraiso - 1973 EMI Capitol México
- La Flor del Maíz - 1973 EMI Capitol México
- Mi Cafetal - 1974 EMI Capitol México
- El Pachuli - 1974 EMI Capitol Mexico
