= Sonidero =

Term in Mexican popular culture

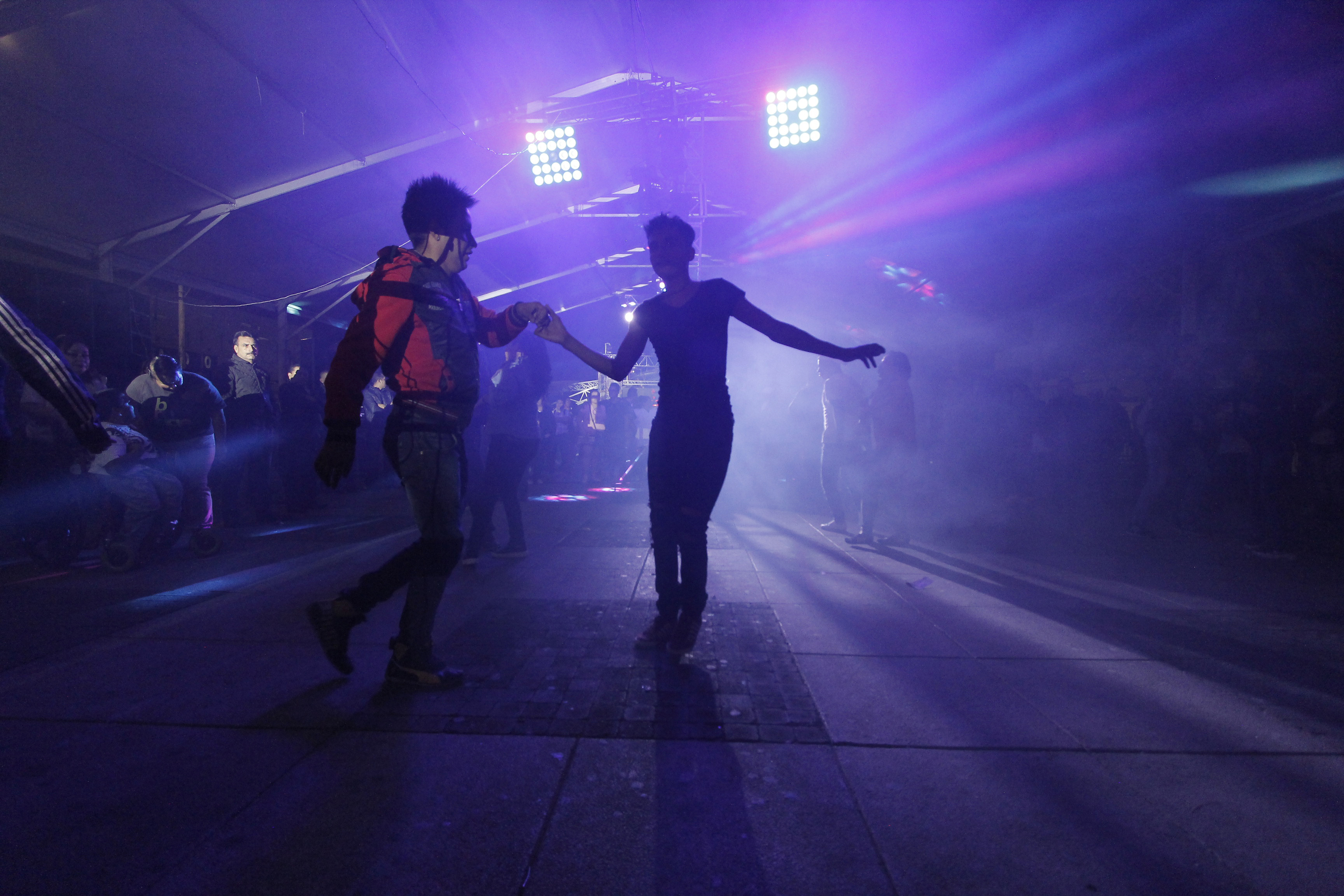
Two people dancing at a baile sonidero in Martín Carrera, Mexico City.

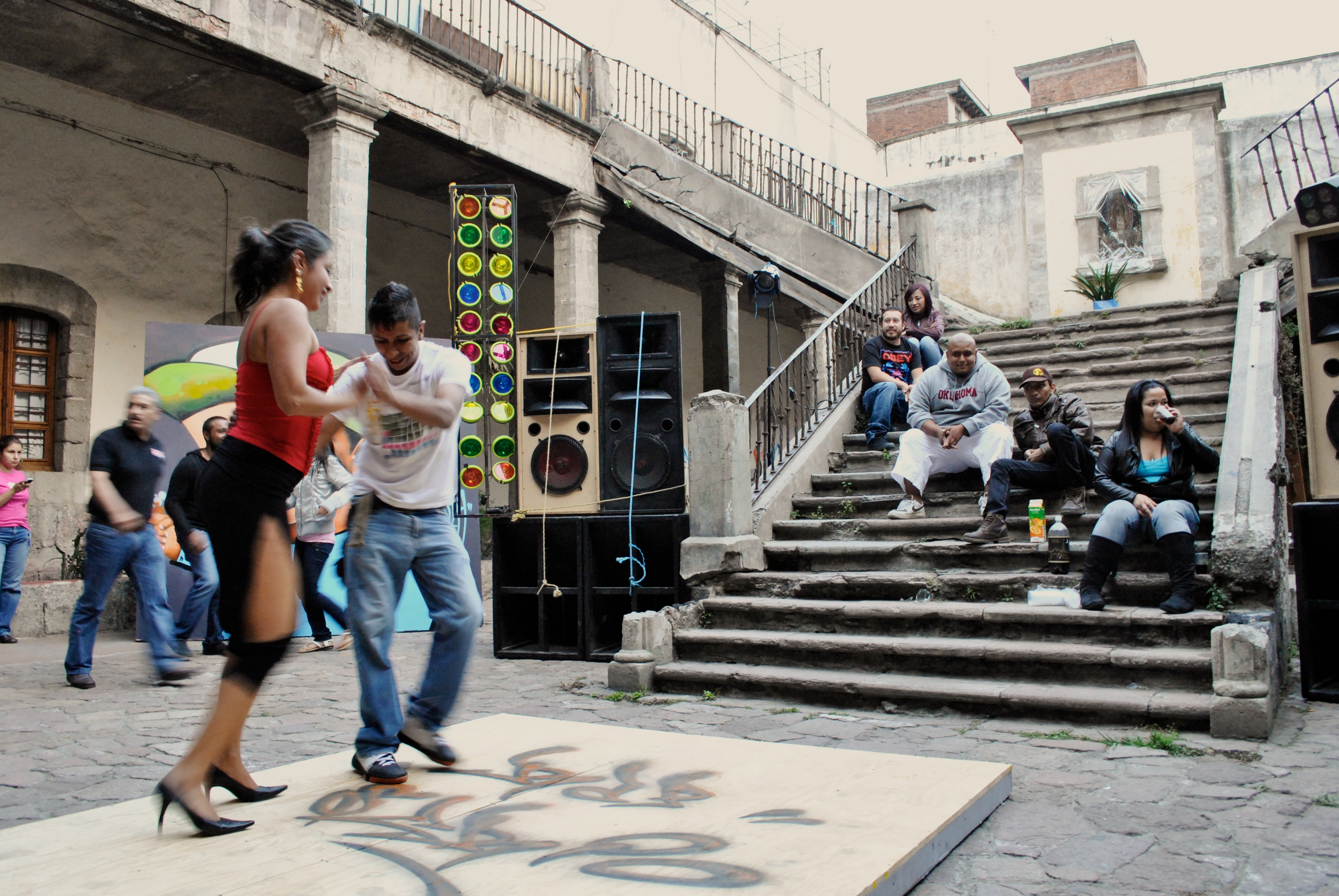
Couple dancing cumbia in the backyard of a vecindad. Behind them are the lights and audio equipment of a sonido.

In Mexican popular culture, a sonidero is a disc jockey, engineer or entertainer that plays recorded music in public, mainly cumbia, salsa, guaracha and their subgenres. The term includes professionals, semiprofessionals and amateur audio, light and video equipment owners (the sonido) used to organize or participate in public dancing events (also called sonidero events) and all the communities behind this urban culture, the sonidero movement.

Some of its distinctive features are the reproduction of recorded music from other genres such as cumbia, salsa, bachata and guaracha, over which the sonidero sends shout-outs and messages to the public simultaneously with the music playing. The advertising and identity of the sounds have their own aesthetic, which is used to announce events permanently in urban spaces in Mexico. In addition to street performances, sonidos are hired for private parties. Likewise sonidero has a strong relationship with Colombian symbols and cultural expressions such as cumbia and vallenato. Sonidero honors Colombian heritage including using names of Colombian cities in their names and the flag of Colombia in their symbols and promotions.

There is no exact source for the sonidero movement tracing the appearance of sonidos in areas such as Tepito, San Juan de Aragón and Peñón de los Baños —named for this reason Colombia Chiquita – and Tacubaya in the mid-20th century. In addition to Mexico City and Greater Mexico City, sonidos and sonideros are present throughout Mexico and the United States due to Mexican immigrant communities.

== See also ==
- Cumbia rebajada
- Mexican cumbia
