= Gran City Pop Tour =

2009–10 concert tour by Paulina Rubio

- Tour by Paulina Rubio
- Associated album: Gran City Pop
- Start date: 18 September 2009
- End date: 28 August 2010
- No. of shows: 44

Paulina Rubio concert chronology
- Amor, Luz y Sonido Tour (2007); Gran City Pop Tour (2009–2010); Brava! Tour (2012)

The Gran City Pop Tour is the fourth solo concert tour by Mexican singer Paulina Rubio in support of her ninth studio album Gran City Pop. The tour began on 18 September 2009, in Primm, Nevada and ended on 28 August 2010 in Medellín, Colombia. The Gran City Pop Tour was considered Rubio's most successful tour to date, visiting over 13 countries in North America, South America and Europe. The last sold out concert was recorded at the Auditorio Nacional's 10,000+ crowd in Mexico CIty.

== Critical response ==
The tour received positive reviews from the entertainment press. The website Elcomercioonline compared the show to Madonna's shows, assuring that it combines "her greatest hits with choreographies along with a corps de ballet and numerous costume changes."

== Set list ==
This set list represents the 21 November 2009 show at the Auditorio Nacional in Mexico. It does not represent all dates throughout the tour.

1. "Algo De Ti"
2. "Ni Una Sola Palabra"
3. "Lo Haré Por Ti"
4. "Todo Mi Amor"
5. "Más Que Amigo"
6. "Yo No Soy Esa Mujer"
7. "El Último Adiós"
8. "Dame Otro Tequila"
9. "Ni Rosas Ni Juguetes"
10. "Nada Puede Cambiarme"
11. "Baila Casanova"
12. "Mío" (duet with Jay de la Cueva from Moderatto) (contains guitars elements of "Beat It" by Michael Jackson)
13. "Algo Tienes"
14. "Melodía De Tu Alma"
15. "Sabor A Miel" / "Enamorada" / "Amor De Mujer"
16. "A Contraluz"
17. "Don't Say Goodbye"

Encore

18. "Causa Y Efecto"
19. "Y Yo Sigo Aquí"
20. "Te Quise Tanto"

Notes

- "Enséñame" was performed at US dates.

== Tour dates ==
| Date | City | Country | Venue | Attendance |
North America
| September 18, 2009 | Primm | United States | Star of the Desert Arena | |
| September 19, 2009 | San Diego | United States | House of Blues | |
| September 24, 2009 | Cabazon | United States | Morongo Casino, Resort & Spa | |
| September 25, 2009 | Los Angeles | United States | Nokia Theatre L.A. Live | |
| September 26, 2009 | Oakland | United States | Fox Oakland Theatre | |
| October 2, 2009 | Tempe | United States | Marquee Theatre | |
| October 3, 2009 | Albuquerque | United States | Sunshine Building | |
| October 5, 2009 | Friant | United States | Table Mountain Rancheria Casino | 3,000 / 3,000 |
| October 7, 2009 | Grand Prairie | United States | Nokia Live | 6,000 / 6,000 |
| October 9, 2009 | Oranjestad | Aruba | Aruba Entertainment Center | 2,800 / 2,800 |
| October 11, 2009 | Houston | United States | Warehouse Live | 2,000 / 2,000 |
| October 17, 2009 | Chicago | United States | Congress Theater | |
| October 20, 2009 | New York City | United States | Nokia Theatre Times Square | |
| October 25, 2009 | Washington D. C. | United States | Warner Theatre | |
| October 30, 2009 | Miami | United States | Gusman Theatre | |
Latin America
| October 31, 2009 | Chía | Colombia | Guaymaral Airport | |
| November 7, 2009 | Ciudad de Victoria | Mexico | | |
| November 13, 2009 | Puebla | Mexico | Auditorio Siglo XXI | |
| November 16, 2009 | Cartagena de Indias | Colombia | Centro de Convenciones de Cartagena; Miss Colombia 2009 | |
| November 18, 2009 | Monterrey | Mexico | Arena Monterrey | 11,500 / 11,500 |
| November 21, 2009 | Mexico City | Mexico | National Auditorium | |
| November 22, 2009 | Zapopan | Mexico | Telmex Auditorium | |
| November 25, 2009 | Mérida | Mexico | Time kart Mérida | |
| November 27, 2009 | Tuxtla Gutierrez | Mexico | Palenque | |
| December 5, 2009 | Querétaro | Mexico | Club Balvanera | |
| December 28, 2009 | Panama City | Panama | Teatro Anayansi | |
| December 30, 2009 | Santo Domingo | Dominican Republic | Altos de Chavon | 4,000 / 5,000 |
| March 21, 2010 | Guatemala City | Guatemala | Estadio Mateo Flores | |
| April 1, 2010 | Punta del Este | Uruguay | Conrad Resort | |
| April 3, 2010 | Buenos Aires | Argentina | Teatro Gran Rex | |
| May 1, 2010 | Tijuana | Mexico | Auditorio Fausto Gutierrez Moreno | |
Europe
| May 7, 2010 | Benidorm | Spain | Plaza de Toros | |
| May 8, 2010 | Valdemoro | Spain | Campo de Fútbol de Vallecas | |
| May 21, 2010 | Málaga | Spain | Málaga Auditorium Club | |
| May 22, 2010 | Almeria | Spain | Estadio de los Juegos Mediterráneos | |
| May 26, 2010 | Madrid | Spain | Palacio de Cristal del Retiro | |
| May 28, 2010 | Galicia | Spain | | |
| May 29, 2010 | Valladolid | Spain | Estadio Nuevo José Zorrilla | |
| May 30, 2010 | Castilla-La Mancha | Spain | | |
Latin America
| June 11, 2010 | Guayaquil | Ecuador | José Joaquín de Olmedo International Airport | |
| August 20, 2010 | Barquisimeto | Venezuela | Estadio Metropolitano de Fútbol de Lara | |
| August 22, 2010 | Caracas | Venezuela | Estadio Universitario | |
| August 27, 2010 | Tocancipá | Colombia | Jaime Duque Park | |
| August 28, 2010 | Medellín | Colombia | Discoteca Palmahia | |

== Cancelled shows ==
List of cancelled concerts, showing date, city, country, venue and reason for cancellation
| Date | City | Country | Venue | Reason |
|---|---|---|---|---|
| November 2, 2009 | Bogotá | Colombia | Gimnasio Moderno High School Auditorium | canceled by two shows near to the city. |
| June 12, 2010 | Lima | Peru | Explanada del Estadio Monumental | Unknown |
| August 30, 2010 | Tunja | Colombia | La Independencia Stadium | Unknown |
| September 2, 2010 | Montería | Colombia | June 18 Baseball Stadium | Unknown |
| September 3, 2010 | Pereira | Colombia | Matecaña City Zoo | Unknown |

== Personnel ==
- Andreas Geck – musical director, bass
- Daniel Mandelman – keys
- Benjamin Hazlett – guitar
- David Salinas – bass
- Mikey Pesante – background vocals
- Melissa Garcia – background vocals

Credits:
