= Gran City Pop: The Remixes =

EP by Paulina Rubio
- Released: April 27, 2010
- Recorded: 2009
- Genres: Pop; dance; electro
- Length: 27:55
- Label: Universal Music Spain

Paulina Rubio chronology
6 Super Hits (2009)	Gran City Pop: The Remixes (2010)	Brava! (2011)

Singles from Gran City Pop: The Remixes
- 1. "Ni Rosas Ni Juguetes (Mr. 305 Remix) feat. Pitbull" Released: November 10, 2009

Gran City Pop: The Remixes is an extended play by Mexican singer Paulina Rubio. It was released only on a digital format by Universal Music Spain on April 27, 2010. It includes all the official remixes of "Causa y Efecto", "Ni Rosas Ni Juguetes" and "Algo De Ti", the three singles from her ninth studio album, Gran City Pop (2009).

== Track listing ==
Gran City Pop: The Remixes
No.	Title	Writer(s)	Length
1.	"Causa Y Efecto"	Mario Domm; Monica Velez; Angel & Khriz	4:04
2.	"Ni Rosas, Ni Juguetes (Mr. 305 Remix) feat. Pitbull"	Claudia Brant; Gian Marco; Noel Schajris; Pitbull	3:35
3.	"Ni Rosas, Ni Juguetes (Juan Magán Remix)"	Brant; Gian Marco; Schajris	3:33
4.	"Algo De Ti (Junior Caldera Radio Remix)"	Paulina Rubio; Rafael Vergara; Mauricio Gasca	3:39
5.	"Algo De Ti (Junior Caldera Club Remix)"	Rubio; Vergara; Gasca	6:03
6.	"Algo De Ti (Remix Urban) feat. Juan Magán"	Rubio; Vergara; Gasca; Juan Magán	3:21
7.	"Algo De Ti (Juan Magan Dance Remix)"	Rubio; Vergara; Gasca	3:36
Total length:			27:55
