= Gran City Pop =

Studio album by Paulina Rubio
- Released: June 23, 2009
- Recorded: January 2008–2009
- Studios: Ananda Studios, Miami; C-Rod Music, Miami; Cubejam, Miami; Midnight Blue Studios, Miami; The Real Studios, Miami; Noisy House, Madrid; Mondomix, Buenos Aires
- Genres: Latin pop; pop rock; dance pop
- Length: 35:14 (standard 10-track edition); 46:49 (U.S. deluxe edition)
- Label: Universal Latino
- Producers: Cachorro López; Fernando Montesinos; Chris Rodríguez; Lester Méndez; Coti; Alberto "Lion King" De León

Paulina Rubio chronology
Paulina Remixes (2007)	Gran City Pop (2009)	Gran City Pop: The Remixes (2010)

Singles from Gran City Pop
- 1. "Causa y Efecto" Released: March 30, 2009; 2. "Ni Rosas Ni Juguetes" Released: August 17, 2009; 3. "Algo De Ti" Released: March 22, 2010

Gran City Pop is the ninth studio album by Mexican singer Paulina Rubio, released by Universal Latino on June 23, 2009. The pop album expanded the Rubio's stylistic palette by combining elements of genres such as rock, ranchera, hip-hop, Eurodisco and arena rock, and she became more involved in songwriting and creative elaboration, extracting influences from various dance-pop-based genres including electropop, synth-pop and eighties British pop.

In 2008, Rubio began working again with Argentinian music producer Cachorro López, who served as the executive producer of her previous album Ananda (2006). The two collaborated with various producers and writers on the album, including Lester Méndez, Mario Domm, Noel Schajris, Gianmarco and Fernando Osorio. Rubio also collaborated again with Colombian songwriter Estéfano after six years, and other songwriters and producers with whom she previously collaborated such as Coti, Chris Rodriguez and Fernando Montesinos.

Gran City Pop received acclaimed reviews from music critics, many of whom complimented it as a return fresh sounds, and received a nomination for a Grammy Award for Best Latin Pop Album. In Mexico, Gran City Pop peaked at number two on the Mexican Albums Chart, and was certified gold by the Asociación Mexicana de Productores de Fonogramas y Videogramas (AMPROFON). In the United States, the album debuted at number forty-four on the Billboard 200, with first-week sales of over 9,400 copies, while it debuted at number two on the Top Latin Albums chart and number one on the Latin Pop Albums chart. Additionally, it sold 100,000 copies in United States, and manage to sell 400,000 copies worldwide.

Three singles were released from Gran City Pop. The lead single, "Causa Y Efecto", peaked at number one in the United States Latin charts, Mexico general chart and Spain airplay chart. Subsequent single "Ni Rosas Ni Juguetes" also was a success in Latin America, and "Algo De Ti" generally underperformed on the charts, but the music video was a hit in the television. To further promote the album, Rubio embarked on the Gran City Pop Tour in 2009.

== Background and production ==
Following take a sabbatical year, Rubio released her eighth studio album, Ananda, in September 2006. Slated to be released as Rubio's comeback album, Ananda was certified twice times platinum in the United States after it atop at number one on the Billboard Top Latin Albums. In Spain, the album peaked at number two on the Spanish Albums Chart and was eventually certified double platinum, becoming her second best-selling album in that territory, after Paulina (2000). Critical reception towards Ananda was favourable, many critics felt it a transition to pop-rock sound, acknowledging Rubio's mature perceptions.

In November 2007, Universal Music announced Rubio's "started recording her next album in her [home]studio in Miami (Florida) which she plans to release in the fall of 2008" She had recently finished her Amor Luz y Sonido tour, so she had already written some songs. During American television and radio host Larry King's 75th birthday charity party, Rubio announced: "I've been recording with Estéfano, Cachorro López for many months ... They are my songs and Coti's, it's rock & roll, pop music, rancheras and those songs that touch your heart at a time when I am very much in love, very full, trying to put down roots." Until then, the production had features compositions by Estéfano, Los Rabanes, Jeremías, Noel Schajris, Gian Marco Zignago, Lester Méndez, and Mario Domm. Paulina prepared her album with her own songs with the help of Coti, who had a big influence in the writing of the album. Speaking to a Mexican radio program, she said that the new material presented many changes. She explained: "[...] at the same time I remain very loyal to my music; my rancheras, boleros, and simple rhythms like the songs we used to listen to as children". She also added: "This new production will have songs by Mario Domm, the leader of Camila, and Estéfano, but there are some songs of mine with Coti; it's an album to get out the child within us".

On December 8, 2008, Rubio performed at the opening of Teleton México to raise funds for the benefit of the Teleton Centers for Children with Different Abilities. She sing a pop-rock version of "Solo Le Pido A Dios", originally performed by Argentine folk rock musician León Gieco. At that time, Universal Music was already preparing the release of the first single, but it was delayed by Rubio's decision because "[I] thought I had finished the album and a person I love very much told me that it was not finished." Rubio explained "the album improved a lot from June to December [2008]. I wrote more songs and when I had 34 love letters, because that's what I call them [the songs], I chose 10 again and went back to redoing verses."

Since Rubio was during those months traveling around the world, especially going to and from Miami, Mexico and Madrid, most of the songs he wrote while giving concerts. She was very inspired by these three cities during the songwriting process.

== Music and concept ==
The standard edition of Gran City Pop is thirty five minutes long, consisting of 10 tracks, while the deluxe adds bonus songs for different editions. A special edition was released on February 17, 2010, exclusively in Spain. This included remixes of "Causa Y Efecto" and "Ni Rosas Ni Juguetes"

=== Concept ===
"Gran City Pop is a city where people speak Spanglish, where freedom reigns and where love prospers and there is no violence, [...] The city itself was inspired by several places, including Mexico, which is my homeland; Madrid, Spain; and Miami in the U.S.

— Paulina Rubio talking about "Gran City Pop"

The album was formed around the conceptual city of "Gran City Pop", created by Rubio and represented through the album's accompanying marketing and music videos. It is an utopic and "enormous city" where Rubio explore through "one vision, some of the life and musical experiences lived during the last years in many cities of the world." She was inspired by the cities of Mexico City, Miami and Madrid for the fictional city name, same cities were the albums was recording.

Gran City Pop is a mix of places, cultures and desires. Rubio describes it as a city "very earthy and very organic where everything is an amalgam; a mixture that allows to unite instead of divide", where borders do not exist; is a place "where people speak Spanglish, where freedom reigns and where love prospers and there is no violence". The metropolis exudes a smell of tequila, roses and red wine. In Gran City Pop, human rights are the fundamental pillar of the social system. There is no hate, no racism, no homophobia. Same-sex marriage is considered to be a human right. Its inhabitants "enjoy literature, music, gastronomy, friendship, family, sunsets and full moons."

In the album's booklet, journalist and writer Boris Izaguirre details how Rubio returns stepping "on the asphalt" of Gran City Pop. He describes her as a "rock soul" who manages to "unite all its bridges, combine its colors and savor its mixes "with the city to which he returns once more. Izaguirre makes the city of Gran City Pop visible with "skyscrapers of multiple colors", some of its streets are called México, Madrid, Miami, Mar y Mirar, which contain a "show of emotions, lights, dreams and hopes", where a mixture of places such as Maya, Hollywood, Bollywood, New York, London, Buenos Aires and Paris. He also cites the cultural influence of Julio Cortázar, Salvador Dalí, Andy Warhol, and Frida Kahlo. In his review of the album from Club Fonograma, Carlos Reyes described Rubio as "a hippy in the fancy pop city she aims to create", and acknowledged that Gran City Pop "not a very enchanting city, but it's got mayor with plenty of personality to win the popular vote."

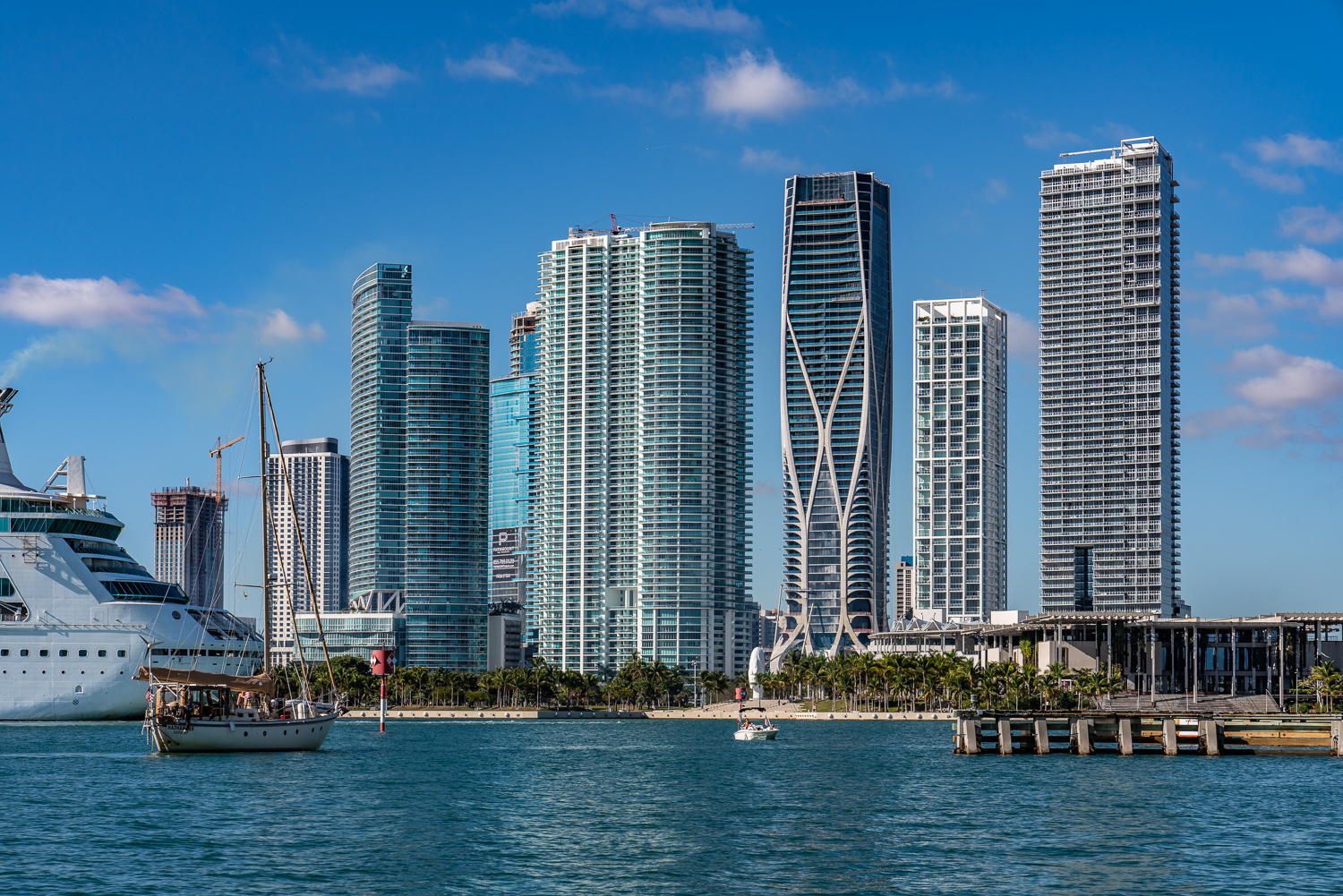
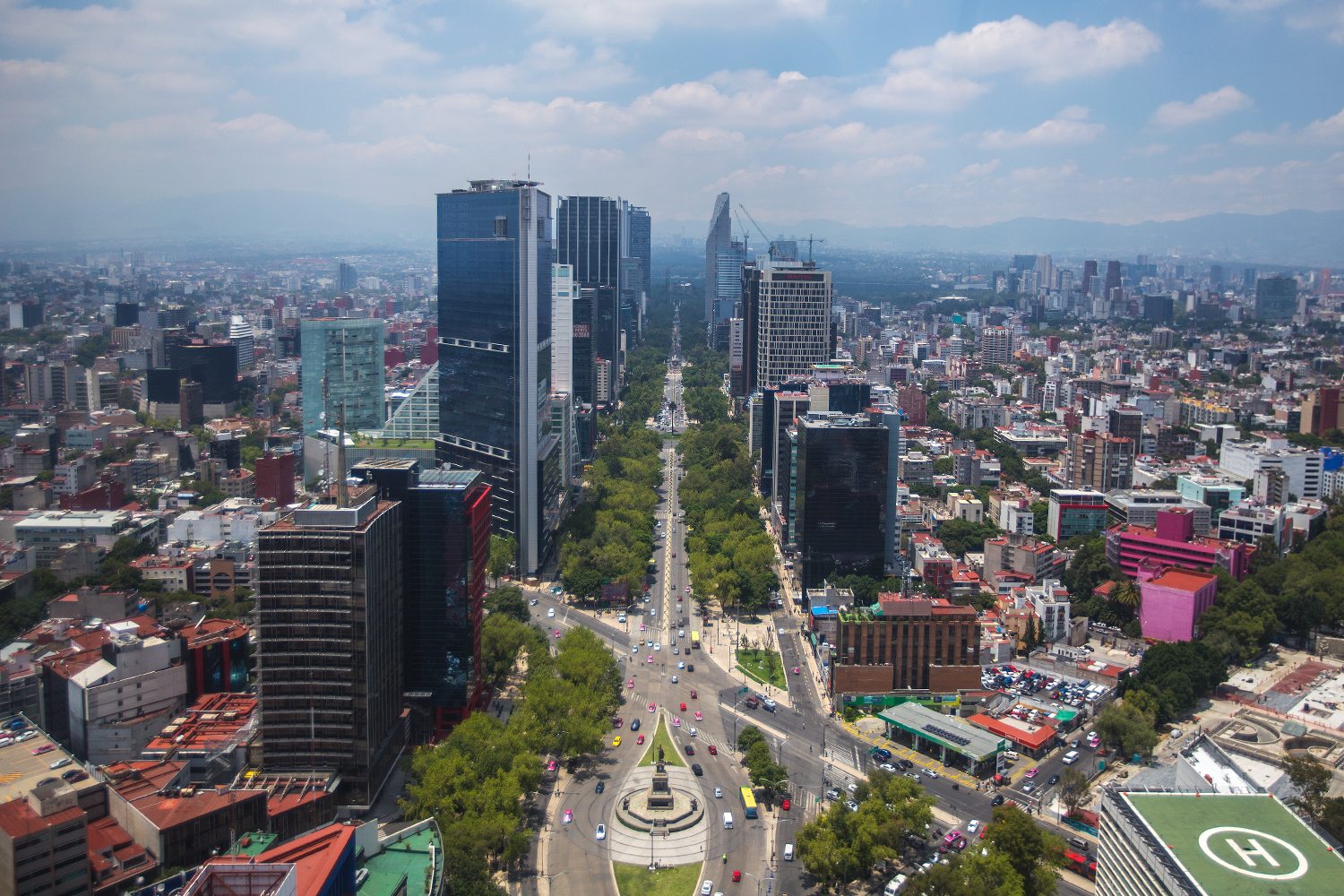
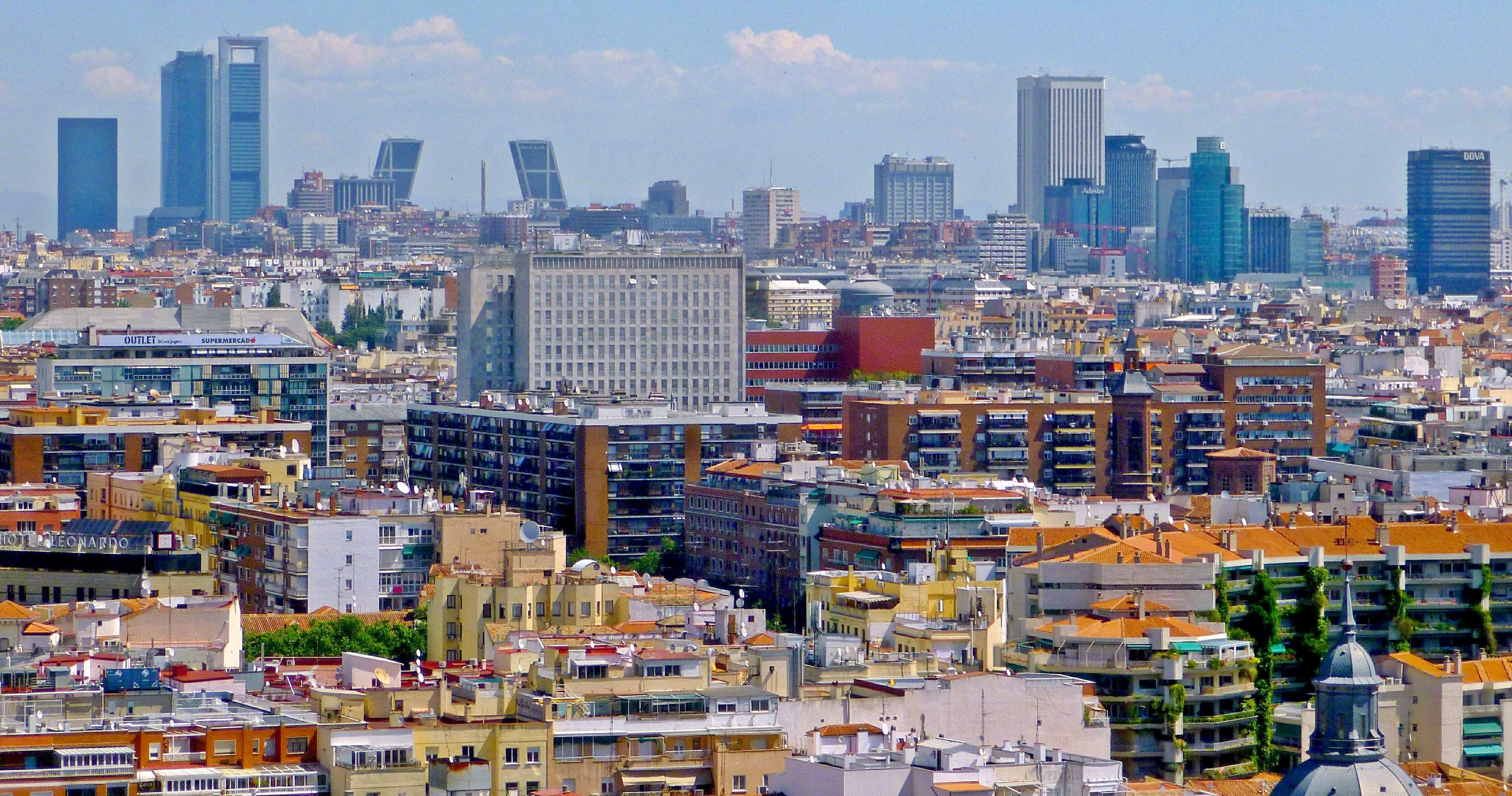
Gran City Pop is inspired by Miami, Mexico City and Madrid.

=== Composition ===
The album highlights to "upbeat sound". with Rubio sounding "like she's having a blast on every song, even the ones that are about the pitfalls of love." She revealed that the songs "reflect the moment she is living and her growth as a person." Like her previous records, contains many different genres of music. Gran City Pop is an "eclectic" album, including pop rock, dance-pop, electropop and Latin pop-styles with 80s-influenced beats such as synth-pop, British pop and city pop. Much of the album discusses principle of karma, spirituality, fantasy, magic and illusion, all from the perspective of love.

Gran City Pop opens with "Causa y Efecto", a big-beat pop song propelled by sampled Gary Glitter's beat "Rock and Roll", which deals with the concepts of karma and causality. The second track "La Danza del Escorpión" was described as a "pungent club anthem" that sticks to distinctives Rubio's Latin guitar riffs. Lyrically it is about a "scorned love" where Rubio alludes to the popular legend of the scorpion and the fire that, when stung with its own sting, ends up poisoning itself. "Enséñame" is a romantic electro-pop and synth-pop song with guitars by Fernando Perdomo. It received positive reviews, but its lyrics were criticized for being cliché. The song was compared to works by the New Order. "Melodía De Tu Alma" is a pop ballad song that provides a glimpse into Rubio's love life with then husband Nicolás "Colate" Vallejo Nájera, recounting her wishes to start a family. The lyrics alluding to the popular concept of soulmate, while sonically it incorporates classical and rock music instrumentation. "Más Que Amigo" is a rhythmic pop song about love and friendship.

Opening as radio station, the feminist anthem "Ni Rosas Ni Juguetes" is hybrid ranchera/hip-hop Latin pop song. Features a "boom-bap" beat and instrumentation similar to that of Tejano music, Rubio "half-raps, half-sings about how flowers and toys [from a man] won't earn her love". It was met with critical acclaim by most music critics, and was declared to be one of the high points tracks on the album. "Amanecí Sin Ti" is a reggae-style and alternative pop song with acoustic guitars, drums, bass, organs, and keyboards. The song channels a stream of overcoming, in which the narrator claims to feel better after a failed relationship. The eighth track, "Algo De Ti", is a pop and electro-disco song with sampled strings rubbing against hard synth lines. The track opens with hazy sirens using a sound effects, with Rubio's whispery and melodious vocals contrast dance-pop beat. Over a ticking arrangement of keyboards, violins, cello, and harp harmonies, the song depicts feeling of living inside a vicious circle of a relationship destined to fail. It was compared to works by Lady Gaga. "A Contraluz" is a dance-pop and electronic track with Rubio whispering away as she moves on and ends the song. Rubio sings about deciding to end a romance without drama in the tenth track, "Escaleras de Arena". It is a pop rock, and arena tune, with hushed tambourine, guitar riffs, drums, and piano, that talks about "a relationship that ends" and the "disappointment of love" but from an optimistic point of view.

== Artwork ==
Spanish design team Pon un Diseñador Gráfico en tu Vida were responsible for the artwork of Gran City Pop. For the album illustration, Paulina Rubio wears an "exotic" purple sequinned mini-dress with a sweetheart neckline, from the Armand Basi One Spring-Summer 2009 line. She completes her outfit with gold platform shoes with fringed bracelet signed by Christian Louboutin; and fingerless gloves. In it, she pretends to be singing, while clutching a silver microphone with a base. Rubio has his eyes closed with an expression of peace and happiness, while covering his half face with a purple "futuristic" face shield style cap. Behind her, a blue daytime sky and visible clouds; buildings; and the sea, reflecting the blue sky are shown. This is a shot of the city of Miami Beach, Florida, one of the cities inspired by "Gran City Pop".

On the back cover of the album, Rubio looks much more rebellious and carefree with the city skyline behind her. She holding her electric guitar while the wind ruffles her blonde hair and she wears a pair of sunglasses. It was compared with City to City album cover by Gerry Rafferty painted by John Patrick Byrne. About the image she wanted to project she said, "My image has always tried to be very glamorous and, at the same time, with a lot of rock; that's what we are trying to reflect because Gran City Pop has a very close collaboration with rock and has different genres within the same album." The photo sessions were done by Gustavo López Mañas, who worked with the singer for the first time. He took the concept of Rubio's album and managed to manifest his own stamp, inspired by comic books.

== Promotion ==
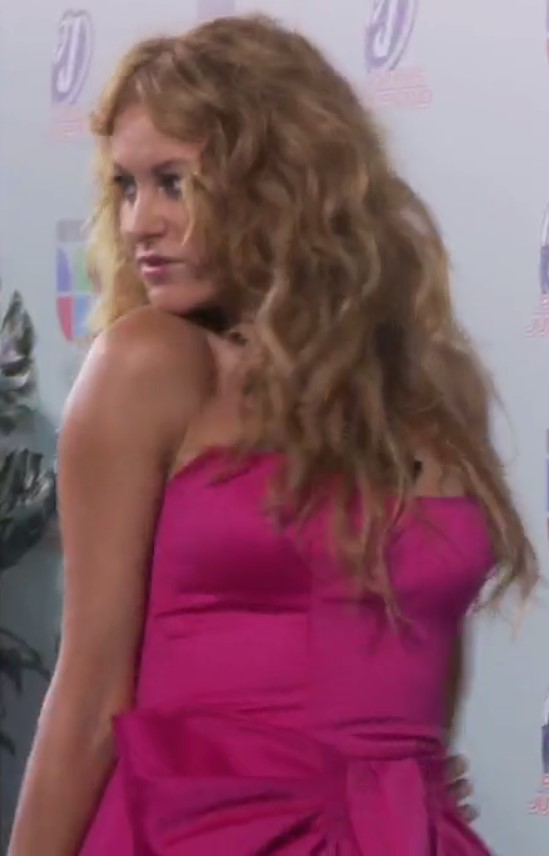
Paulina Rubio at Premios Juventud red carpet in July 2009

Rubio's comeback took place in April 23, at the 2009 Billboard Latin Music Awards, where she performed Gran City Pop's lead single, "Causa y Efecto", for the first time. She wore a pink sequined micro-mini-dress and fingerless gold gloves. According with Billboard, she "presented herself as a woman in command" setting off a stadium-style wave by the dancers and drummers onstage, belonging to Miami Northwestern Senior High School. Rubio also performed live at Univision's Premios Juventud. Rubio made a private concert at Gotham Hall in New York City on May 11 to promote Gran City Pop. The concert was presented by Univision Radio. During her stay in New York, she visited the MTV Tr3s Studios, she taped the show ESL, and presented fans the single "Causa y Efecto". The performance was aired on May 14.

Rubio appeared at Los Premios MTV Latinoamérica 2009 on October 15 along with Cobra Starship performing "Good Girls Go Bad" and "Ni Rosas Ni Juguetes". She was the female performer with the most nominations (and second most overall): "Video of the Year", "Best Artist", "Best Pop Artist", "Best Solo Artist" and "Artist of the Year". She won "Best Solo Artist", which became her first award. Rubio and Cobra Starship won an MTV Award for "Best Live Performance at Los Premios 2009", as voted by the public, beating artists such as Shakira, Nelly Furtado, and Wisin & Yandel. On November 1, Paulina performed "Ni Rosas Ni Juguetes" on ¡Viva el Sueño!, a reality competition show similar to American Idol.

On November 12, she performed at the 2009 Premios Telehit in Mexico and was given the award for being the Mexican female artist with most international fame. Paulina performed at the Miss Colombia 2009 ceremony on November 16. Paulina performed at Premios Oye! and won the "Audience Award", given to her by her mother Susana Dosamantes. On February 5, 2010, Paulina performed at the 2010 Pepsi Super Bowl Fan Jam. On February 18, Paulina performed at the Premios Lo Nuestro 2010. Lastly, Paulina performed "Algo De Ti" for the first time at the 2010 Billboard Latin Music Awards on April 29 as a duet with rapper/singer Wyclef Jean.

=== Singles ===
Three singles were released to promote Gran City Pop. "Causa y Efecto" was released as its lead single on March 30, 2009. The song premiere was performed at the 2009 Latin Billboard Music Awards; it was one of the most expected moments of the night. Commercially, "Causa y Efecto" was a success in America and Spain, where it was certified platinum for selling 40,000 copies. It peaked at number one on the US Billboard Hot Latin Songs, Mexico Singles Chart, and Spanish Airplay Chart, while also reached the top 20 in Venezuela. An accompanying music video for the song was directed by Rudi Dolezal and features Rubio singing the song in different scenarios with an 80's retro vibe. The video shows a Newton's pendulum is observed that refers to the lyrics of the song. "Causa y Efecto" was awarded as Song of the Year Pop/Ballad by ASCAP, as well, received multiple nominations at different award ceremonies.

"Ni Rosas Ni Juguetes" was released as the album's second single on August 17, 2009. It peaked number one on Peru, and reached number three on Spain, where was certified platinum, becoming the album's second consecutive hit in that territory. In the United States, the song reached at number nine on the Billboard Hot Latin Songs chart, while peaked number five on the Latin Pop Songs chart. The accompanying music video, directed by Jessy Terrero, inspired by the movie Mr. & Mrs. Smith, features Rubio as an empowered woman. In November 2009, was released two alternate versions of "Ni Rosas Ni Juguetes"; The first, a duet remix featuring Pitbull, who contributed verses written by himself, the second, a banda version, with vocals by Regional Mexican singer Jenni Rivera.

"Algo De Ti" was released as the third single from the album, in April 2010. The single peaked at number 48 on the Spanish chart, thus becoming the first single release from Gran City Pop to miss charting inside the top 10, while peaking at number 32 on the Mexico Airplay chart. The music video of the song, directed by Steven Oritt, was premiered in June 2010 on Rubio's YouTube channel. It became one of the most watched videos on television in Spain in 2010. Although "Algo De Ti" would be the last single to be released from Gran City Pop, "La Danza Del Escorpión" was released as the only promotional single from the album, in December 2009. The single managed to reach the top 40 in Mexico, peaking at number 40 on the singles chart.

=== Tour ===
To promote the album, Rubio embarked on the Gran City Pop Tour, beginning on September 18, 2009, at the Star of the Desert Arena in Primm, Nevada. The first leg of the tour featured performances in United States, Caribbean and Mexico. The first two shows of the tour was sold out. The second leg consisting of concerts in South America, the third leg ran in May, 2010 in Spain, and the fourth leg close in Latin America. A live concert show, held at the Auditorio Nacional in Mexico City, was broadcast on Las Estrellas.

== Critical reception ==
Professional ratings
Review scores
Source	Rating
Allmusic	4/5 stars
Broadcast Music, Inc.	(Positive)
Club Fonograma	(40/100)
Enelshow.com	4/5 stars

Gran City Pop received generally positive reviews from music critics. Phil Freeman from AllMusic praised Rubio's choice of collaborators and producers, and appreciated the album's cohesion "almost miraculously" despite "style-hopping" of each song "from electro to pop/rock to indefinable blends of whatever works." He also complimented Rubio's "ability to create consistent sound, and commented "she's a pure pop artist, throwing anything and everything at the wall with no goal beyond a hooky melody, and Gran City Pop has plenty of them." Rachel Devitt from Rhapsody gave the album a positive review and found it to be an "a potent reminder of why she is such a mega-star in the Latin pop world", adding that "Rubio's flexible voice and diva charisma allow her to carry off each style with attitude and flair."

Jesús Rodríguez de El País considers Gran City Pop as a "party and romance tailor's drawer; pop rhythms, Latin airs, rock guitars, rancheras and tequila, melodic song and disco sound packaged under the concept of the three cities that have marked her life: Mexico City, Madrid and Miami. " Dan Kimpel from Broadcast Music, Inc. praised the sound of the album and said that "the sonic scope of the songs and the production is vast and varied". He also highlighted Rubio's versatility as a songwriter and singer. David Dorantes from Houston Chronicle also praised the album's production, but felt that it did not contribute anything new and stated that "advancing along paths of fusion already well explored, it reflects a certain turn in his career, with more elaborate mixes than in previous albums." Music journalist Carlos Reyes was a bit more severe in his review from the Club Fonograma music blog, considering "[Gran City Pop] not a very enchanting city", although like most critics, he praised the album production and ended by saying that ay least "[Gran City Pop] got mayor (Rubio) with plenty of personality to win the popular vote."

== Accolades ==
Year	Category	Award	Result	Ref.
2009	Album of the Year	El Disco del Año	Nominated	
2010	Best Latin Pop Album	Grammy Awards	Nominated	

== Commercial performance ==
Based on pre-orders sales alone, the album topped the iTunes' Latino chart. Gran City Pop debuted at number forty-four on the US Billboard 200, with first-week sales of over 9,400 copies; it marked Rubio's third highest-peaking album on the chart, behind Ananda (2006) and Border Girl (2002). The album debuted at number two on the US Billboard Latin Albums chart and number one on the Latin Pop Albums chart. The album sold over 100,000 copies in the United States, and 200,000 in Puerto Rico.

Gran City Pop entered at number three on the Spanish Albums Chart, and peaked it number two. The album debuted at number two on the Mexican Albums Chart where received the Gold certification there for over 40,000 units in its first week. On the Spain Albums Chart, Gran City Pop debuted at number three. This album also earned Paulina five nominations to the MTV Awards.

The album sold over 300,000 copies all around the world in only one week after its release. To December 2009, Gran City Pop sold over 400,000 units.

== Track listing ==
Gran City Pop – Standard edition
No.	Title	Writer(s)	Producer(s)	Length
1.	"Causa y Efecto"	Mario Domínguez; Mónica Vélez	Cachorro López	03:26
2.	"La Danza Del Escorpión"	Paulina Rubio; Fernando Montesinos	Fernando Montesinos	03:12
3.	"Enséñame"	Rubio; Estéfano; David Cabrera	Chris Rodríguez	03:40
4.	"Melodía De Tú Alma"	Rubio; Estéfano; Cabrera	Rodríguez	03:59
5.	"Más Que Amigo"	Rubio; Estéfano; Cabrera	Rodríguez	03:44
6.	"Ni Rosas Ni Juguetes"	Claudia Brant; Nahuel Schajris; Gian Marco	Cachorro López	03:16
7.	"Amanecí Sin Ti"	Ileana Padrón; Fernando Osorio; Andres Levin	López	03:31
8.	"Algo De Ti"	Rubio; Rafael Vergara; Mauricio Gasca	Lester Méndez	04:06
9.	"A Contraluz"	Rubio; Vergara	Méndez	03:59
10.	"Escaleras De Arena"	Domínguez; Vélez	Méndez	02:42
Total length:				35:28

Gran City Pop – iTunes Store pre-order bonus track
No.	Title	Writer(s)	Producer(s)	Length
11.	"Causa Y Efecto" (Acoustic Version)	Domm; Vélez	López	03:49
Total length:				39:36

Gran City Pop – iTunes Store Standard edition
No.	Title	Writer(s)	Producer(s)	Length
12.	"El Tren De La Vida"	Rubio; Estefano; Cabrera	Rodriguez	03:06
Total length:				39:03

Gran City Pop – Spanish iTunes Store Standard edition
No.	Title	Writer(s)	Producer(s)	Length
13.	"Amanecí Sin Ti" (Motor City Version)	Padrón; Osorio; Federico; Wulff	López	04:18
Total length:				40:05

Gran City Pop – Digital Deluxe Edition bonus tracks
No.	Title	Writer(s)	Producer(s)	Length
14.	"Ya Fue"	Rubio; Coti	Coti	03:01
15.	"Causa Y Efecto" (Banda Version)	Domínguez; Vélez	Alberto "Lion King" De León	03:36
16.	"Causa Y Efecto" (DJ George Figares Club Mix Radio Edit)	Domínguez; Vélez		04:50
17.	"El Tren De La Vida"	Rubio; Estefano; Cabrera	Rodriguez	03:06
18.	"Días De Trabajo En Gran City Pop" (Video)			16:34
19.	"Causa Y Efecto" (Music video)			03:25
20.	"Behind The Scenes: Photoshoot" (Video)			03:30
Total length:				72:29

Gran City Pop – Physical Deluxe Edition bonus tracks
No.	Title	Writer(s)	Producer(s)	Length
11.	"Ya Fue"	Rubio; Coti	Coti	03:01
12.	"Causa Y Efecto" (Banda Version)	Domínguez; Vélez	Alberto "Lion King" De León	03:36
13.	"Causa Y Efecto" (DJ George Figares Club Mix Radio Edit)	Domínguez; Vélez		04:50
Total length:				46:50

Gran City Pop – Physical Deluxe Edition (bonus DVD)
No.	Title	Length
1.	"Días De Trabajo En Gran City Pop"	16:34
2.	"Causa Y Efecto" (Music video)	03:25
3.	"Behind The Scenes" (Photoshoot)	03:30
4.	"Photo Gallery"
Total length:		23:34

=== Special Edition ===
The reissue Gran City Pop: Special Edition was released on February 17, 2010, by Universal Music Spain. This included a remix of "Causa y Efecto" a duet with Angel Y Khriz, another remix of "Ni Rosas Ni Juguetes" a duet with Pitbull that served to promote the material, and another remix of Juan Magán. This edition was released in Europe only.

Gran City Pop – Standard edition
No.	Title	Writer(s)	Producer(s)	Length
1.	"Causa Y Efecto"	Domm; Vélez	López	03:26
2.	"La Danza Del Escorpión"	Rubio; Montesinos	Montesinos	03:12
3.	"Enséñame"	Rubio; Estéfano; Cabrera	Rodríguez	03:40
4.	"Melodía De Tú Alma"	Rubio; Estéfano; Cabrera	Rodríguez	03:59
5.	"Más Que Amigo"	Rubio; Estéfano; Cabrera	Rodríguez	3:43
6.	"Ni Rosas Ni Juguetes"	Brant; Schajris; Marco	López	03:16
7.	"Amanecí Sin Ti"	Padrón; Osorio; Levin	López	03:31
8.	"Algo De Ti"	Rubio; Vergara; Gasca	Méndez	04:06
9.	"A Contraluz"	Rubio; Vergara	Méndez	03:59
10.	"Escaleras De Arena"	Domínguez; Vélez	Méndez	02:42
11.	"Causa Y Efecto" (Remix Angel & Khriz)	Domínguez; Vélez; Ángel Rivera; Christian Colon	López	04:09
12.	"Ni Rosas Ni Juguetes" (Mr. 305 Remix feat. Pitbull)	Brant; Schajris; Marco; Armando Christian Perez	Marc Kinchen	03:38
13.	"Ni Rosas Ni Juguetes" (Magan Eurodance Remix)	Brant; Schajris; Marco	Juan Magán	03:36
Total length:				48:53

== Personnel ==
Credits adapted from the liner notes of Gran City Pop.

=== Musicians ===
- Paulina Rubio – lead vocals, backing vocals
- Flor Ciarlo – additional backing vocals (track 1, 6)
- Sebastián Schon – guitar, keyboards, bass programming (track 1, 6, 7)
- Cachorro López – bass guitar, synthesizer programming (track 1, 6, 7)
- Demian Nava – keyboards (track 1, 6, 7)
- Juan Blas Caballero – keyboards (track 1, 6, 7)
- Laura Rubio – additional backing vocals (track 2)
- Fernando Montesinos – guitar, electric guitar, keyboards, bass programming (track 2)
- Ruben Villanueva – arrangements (track 2)
- Fernando Perdomo – guitar, bass guitar, piano (track 3–5, 12)
- Chris Rodriguez – programming, arrangements (track 3–5, 12)
- Tony Smurphio – synthesizer (track 3)
- XTrings – strings (track 4, 12)
- Derek Citron – drum (track 4, 12)
- Jorge Balbi – drum (track 5)
- Dany Avila – drum (track 7)
- Lester Mendez – keyboards, harp, sound effects, string, piano, tambourine, vocoder (track 8–10)
- Sonus Quartet – strings (track 8)
- Vanessa Freebairn-Smith – cello, violin (track 8)
- James Freebarin-Smith – cello (track 8)
- Wendy Pedersen – additional backing vocals (track 8, 10)
- John Fuzessy – additional backing vocals (track 8, 10)
- Lyle Workman – guitar (track 9, 10)
- Dan Warner – bass guitar (track 10)
- Lee Levin – drums, tambourine (track 10)
- Andres Levin – guitar, bass guitar, keyboards (track 11)
- Skoota Warner - drum (track 11)
- Nora Jimenez – additional backing vocals (track 11)
- Rebeca Rods – additional backing vocals (track 11)
- Fani Ela – additional backing vocals (track 11)

=== Technical ===
- Paulina Rubio – executive production
- Cachorro López – production (track 1, 6, 7); executive production
- Sebastián Schon – engineering, recording (track 1, 6, 7)
- Demian Nava – engineering (track 1, 6, 7)
- Juan Blas Caballero – engineering (track 1, 6, 7)
- Cesar Sogbe – mixing, engineering (track 1, 3–10, 12)
- Fernando Montesinos – production (track 2)
- Bori Alarcón – mixing, engineering (track 2)
- Chris Rodriguez – engineering (track 3–5, 12)
- Enrique Larreal – engineering (track 3–5, 8–12)
- Pedro Nameron – engineering (track 3–5, 12)
- Lester Mendez – production, engineering (track 8–10)
- Carlos "El Loco" – engineering (track 8–10)
- Joel Numa – engineering (track 8–10)
- Cody Acosta – engineering, recording (track 8–10)
- Andres Levin – engineering, recording (track 11)
- Ray Aldeco – engineering (track 11)
- Alex Garcia – engineering (track 11)
- Bob Power – mixing, engineering (track 11)
- Chris Gehringer – mastering

=== Artwork ===
- Gustavo López-Mañas – photography
- Pon un Diseñador Gráfico en tu Vida – design
- Eli Tersse – art direction

== Charts ==
=== Weekly charts ===
Chart (2009)	Peak position
Argentinian Albums (CAPIF)	11
European Albums (Billboard)	43
Mexican Albums (AMPROFON)	2
Spanish Albums (Promusicae)	2
US Top Latin Albums (Billboard)	2
US Latin Pop Albums (Billboard)	1
US Billboard 200	44

=== Year-end charts ===
Chart (2009)	Position
Mexican Albums Chart (AMPROFON)	37
US (Billboard Top Latin Albums)	39
US (Billboard Latin Pop Albums)	11

== Certifications and sales ==
Region	Certification	Certified units/sales
Colombia (ACINPRO)	Gold	
Mexico (AMPROFON)	Gold	40,000^{^}
Puerto Rico	2× Platinum	
Spain (Promusicae)	Gold	30,000^{^}
United States	—	100,000
Summaries
Worldwide	—	400,000
^{^} Shipments figures based on certification alone.
