= Nuvo =

Nuvo or NUVO may refer to:

- NUVO (newspaper), a newspaper in Indiana
- NUVO, network unaffiliated virtual operator
- Nuvo (band), Thai pop-rock band
- Nuvo (liqueur), a liqueur
- nuvoTV, former American cable television network
