= List of top 20 songs of 2009 in Mexico =

This is a list of the General Top 20 songs of 2009 in Mexico according to Monitor Latino. Monitor Latino also issued separate year-end charts for Regional Mexican, Pop and Anglo songs.

№	Title	Artist(s)
1	"Te presumo"	Banda el Recodo
2	"Que te quería"	La Quinta Estación
3	"Aquí estoy yo"	Luis Fonsi ft. Aleks Syntek, David Bisbal & Noel Schajris
4	"Ya es muy tarde"	La Arrolladora Banda El Limón
5	"Causa y efecto"	Paulina Rubio
6	"Loba"	Shakira
7	"Tú no eres para mí"	Fanny Lu
8	"Jueves"	La Oreja de Van Gogh
9	"El favor de la soledad"	Gloria Trevi
10	"Ella es bonita"	Natalia Lafourcade
11	"Derecho de antiguedad"	La Original Banda El Limón de Salvador Lizárraga
12	"En su lugar"	Yuridia
13	"Fui"	Reik
14	"Poker Face"	Lady Gaga
15	"Se te olvidó"	Kalimba
16	"En cambio no"	Laura Pausini
17	"No soy una señora"	María José
18	"Ya lo veía venir"	Moderatto
19	"Lo que yo sé de ti"	Ha*Ash
20	"A quien tú decidiste amar"	Sandoval

== See also ==
- List of number-one songs of 2009 (Mexico)
- List of number-one albums of 2009 (Mexico)
