= ¡Viva el Sueño! =

- Starring: Cristián de la Fuente & Carolina Guerra; Ana Isabelle (winner)
- Country of origin: United States

Original release
- Network: Univision
- Release: August 30 – November 22, 2009

¡Viva el Sueño! (Live the Dream!) is a reality competition to find new solo musical talent. Many are those who dream of being big but very few who reach the success in the music world. ¡Viva el Sueño! will give that opportunity to one of the 14 participants who were chosen from hundreds of applicants. They will fight, on stage, to achieve their dream and receive 200 thousand dollars in prizes and sponsorships. The first-of-its-kind reality competition will pit 14 professional artists who have not yet had their big break and give viewers the chance to select Latin music's next big superstar. Some have gained fame in their countries of origin, others have had the opportunity to perform side by side with some of the industry's biggest stars, but they all still struggle in relative anonymity. " Viva el Sueno!" premiered Sunday, August 30 at 8pm ET/PT (7pm Central) on the Univision Network.

¡Viva el Sueño! was a reality competition series in which contestants rehearsed and performed in weekly live shows. Each week, the participants performed popular Latin music songs in staged musical numbers.The winner received a prize package of $200,000 in cash and prizes. The comeptition was won by Ana Isabelle

== Overview ==
The program is hosted by Hollywood actor and Latin American star Cristián de la Fuente. Model/actress Carolina Guerra provides details and reactions from backstage after each artist's performance. In addition, three Latin radio personalities from across the U.S. make up the expert panel of judges who evaluate the contestants’ performances. They help viewers decide which contestants have the star-quality to make it through the competition. They are: Houston's radio host Raúl Brindis from Univision Radio's Estéreo Latino 102.9 FM; Los Angeles’ Regional Mexican DJ Stephanie Himonidis "La Chiquibaby" from Univision's La Nueva 101.9 FM; and Miami's radio personality Enrique Santos from Univision's La Kalle 98.3 FM.

Each Sunday night, the last three contestants face "El Momento Clave de Bud Light" (Bud Light's Key Moment) as viewers anticipate who gets immunity that night and be given another opportunity to sing for the live audience. The last person left in the spotlight is the person eliminated from the competition.

The "Sala de Ensayo de Coca-Cola" (Coca-Cola Rehearsal Studio) highlights contestant practices as well as interviews in which each contestant shares their dreams and aspirations. Additionally, fans can visit an online section of Univision.com (keyword "Coca-Cola") and submit a short video of a singing performance for a chance to win $10,000. Univision.com selects the top five finalists whose videos are featured online where users have a chance to vote for their favorite videos. Users that vote on the videos will be entered into a sweepstakes and have an opportunity to win a $2,000 cash prize.

The contestant, selected by the judges, are given coaching by a celebrity/artist in the "Apoyo y Guia" (Support and Guidance) segment. This helps them become a better competitor and prepare for the following week.

"Salon Rojo de Target" (Target Red Room) is the exclusive backstage lounge where viewers will get an in-depth look at each artist as they prepare to face another night of competition.

== Contestants ==
Name	Birthplace	Eliminated
Ana Isabelle	Caguas, Puerto Rico	Winner
Cristina	Chihuahua, Chihuahua, México	2 place
Fedro	Navojoa, Sonora, México	3 place
Diego Dibós	Lima, Perú	4 place
Ojeda	México D.F.	5 place
Zone D' Tambora	Bayamón, Puerto Rico	6 place
Yessica	Reynosa, Tamaulipas. México	Episode 10
Sergio Antonio	Los Angeles, California	Episode 9 (returned)
Paco de María	Ciudad Obregón, Sonora	Episode 8
Donnatella	Puebla, México	Episode 7
Bárbara	Santiago de Chile	Episode 6
Yarka Miller	Madrid, España	Episode 5
Fela	Ciudad de México, México	Episode 4
Zuly	Ciudad Victoria, Tamaulipas, México.	Episode 3

== Episode Progress ==
#	Contestant	Episodes												
#	Contestant	1	2	3	4	5	6	7	8	9	10	11	12	13
1	Ana Isabelle	SAFE	SAFE	SAFE	SAFE	SAFE	SAFE	SAFE	SAFE	SAFE	SAFE	SAFE	SAFE	WON
2	Cristina	SAFE	SAFE	SAFE	SAFE	SAFE	SAFE	SAFE	SAFE	RISK	RISK	SAFE	SAFE	OUT
3	Fedro	SAFE	SAFE	SAFE	SAFE	SAFE	SAFE	SAFE	SAFE	SAFE	SAFE	SAFE	SAFE	OUT
4	Diego Dibos	SAFE	SAFE	SAFE	SAFE	SAFE	SAFE	SAFE	SAFE	SAFE	RISK	SAFE	SAFE	OUT
5	Ojeda	SAFE	SAFE	SAFE	RISK	SAFE	SAFE	SAFE	SAFE	SAFE	SAFE	SAFE	SAFE	OUT
6	Zone D'Tambora	SAFE	SAFE	SAFE	SAFE	SAFE	SAFE	SAFE	RISK	SAFE	SAFE	SAFE	SAFE	OUT
7	Sergio Antonio	SAFE	SAFE	SAFE	SAFE	SAFE	SAFE	SAFE	SAFE	OUT	SAFE	SAFE	SAFE	OUT
8	Yessica	SAFE	SAFE	SAFE	SAFE	SAFE	RISK	SAFE	SAFE	SAFE	OUT			
9	Paco De Maria	SAFE	SAFE	SAFE	SAFE	RISK	SAFE	RISK	OUT					
10	Donnatella	SAFE	SAFE	RISK	SAFE	SAFE	SAFE	OUT						
11	Barbara	SAFE	SAFE	SAFE	SAFE	SAFE	OUT							
12	Yarka Miller	SAFE	SAFE	SAFE	SAFE	OUT								
13	Fela	SAFE	SAFE	SAFE	OUT									
14	Zuly	SAFE	SAFE	OUT										

The Contestant won the competition.
The Contestant was at risk for elimination.
The Contestant was eliminated.
The Contestant was eliminated but was given the chance to return.

== Judges & Experts ==
Name	Judge/Host
Enrique Santos	Judge
Raúl Brindis	Judge
Stephanie Himonidis	Judge
Cristián de la Fuente	Host
Carolina Guerra	Co-Host

== Episodes ==
=== Episode 1 ===
Premiered August 30, 2009

Artist (in order of presentation)	Song	Originally sang by
Yessica	De Mí Enamórate	Daniela Romo
Sergio Antonio	Se Me Olvidó Otra Vez	Juan Gabriel
Fela	Ahora Quien	Marc Anthony
Fedro	No Me Enseñaste	Thalía
Barbara	Hasta Que Me Olvides	Luis Miguel
Yarka	Tu recuerdo	Ricky Martin, La Mari & Tommy Torres
Zone D' Tambora	Suavemente	Elvis Crespo

- Eliminated: No Elimination
- Saved by the judges for next week: Yessica

=== Episode 2 ===
Premiered September 6, 2009

Artist (in order of presentation)	Song	Originally sang by
Donnatella	No Te Pido Flores	TBA
Zuly	Detrás de Mi Ventana	Yuri
Cristina	Ojala	TBA
Paco de Maria	Pero Te Extraño	TBA
Ojeda	No tengo dinero	TBA
Ana Isabelle	Imaginame Sin Ti	Luis Fonsi

- Eliminated: No Elimination
- Saved by the judges for next week: Ana Isabelle

=== Episode 3 ===
Premiered September 13, 2009

Artist (in order of presentation)	Song	Originally sang by
Sergio Antonio	Por Mujeres Como Tú	Pepe Aguilar
Cristina	Ven Devórame Otra Vez	TBA
Yarka Miller	Que Lloro	TBA
Yessica	Es Demasiado Tarde	TBA
Fedro	Abrázame Muy Fuerte	Juan Gabriel
Zone D' Tambora	Mi Corazoncito	TBA
Ana Isabelle	Hubo Alguien	TBA
Diego Dibós	Labios Compartidos	TBA
Bárbara	A Puro Dolor	TBA
Donnatella	Amor Prohibido	selena
Zuly	Ni una lágrima	TBA

- Eliminated: Zuly
- Saved by the judges for next week: Yarka

=== Episode 4 ===
Premiered September 20, 2009

Artist (in order of presentation)	Song	Originally sang by
Donnatella	Cucurrucucú paloma	TBA
Zone D 'Tambora	Cielito Lindo	TBA
Paco de Maria	Amanecí En Tus Brazos	TBA
Cristina	Corridos de Chihuahua	TBA
Yarka	Cien Años	TBA
Diego Dibós	El Rey	TBA
Fedro	La Differencia	Juan Gabriel
Yessica	Amor Eterno	TBA
Ojeda	Venia Bendita	TBA
Fela	Por Tu Maldito Amor	TBA

- Eliminated: Fela
- Saved by the judges for next week: Diego
- Guest Star: Shaila Dúrcal

=== Episode 5 ===
Premiered September 27, 2009

Artist (in order of presentation)	Song	Originally sang by
Ojeda	La Bomba	TBA
Ana Isabelle	Y Si Te Digo	TBA
Yessica	a Pollera Colora	TBA
Sergio Antonio	No Me Se Rajar	TBA
Zone D'Tambora	La Gota Fria	TBA
Gloria Trevi	Lo Que Una Chica Por Amor Es Capaz	TBA
Barbara	Cada Que	Juan Gabriel
Fedro	Livin 'La Vida Loca	TBA
Christina	Ríe y Llora	TBA
Donnatella	Me Equivoqué	TBA
Paco	Yo No Fui	TBA
Yarka Miller	Condenado sin contestador	TBA

- Eliminated: Yarka Miller
- Saved by the judges for next week: Cristina
- Guest Star: Gloria Trevi

=== Episode 6 ===
Premiered October 4, 2009

The dynamics of competition changed this week and Carolina Guerra, from the balcony, called out the names of four artists. Fedro, Sergio Antonio, Paco de María and Donnatella came down the stage to hear what Cristian de la Fuente had to say to them. Of these four artists, three were safe and one of them was in danger of being eliminated. The first person saved from the night was Paco de María and sang "Te Lo Pido Por Favor", and Donnatella, also saved by the public, sang "El Destino". Fedro, the first artist in danger of elimination, sat in the danger zone while Sergio Antonio was saved and sang "Mi Fracaso". Cristina sang "Ya Lo Se Que Tú Te Vas". Ojeda, Barbara and Zone D 'Tambora came out on stage and one of them was one of the least advantaged with the public's votes. The members of Zone D'Tambora had the opportunity to remain in the competition and sang "Querida". Barbara was the second artist to be in danger of being eliminated and Ojeda, after being safe, sang "He Venido A Pedirte Perdón". Ana Isabelle, Diego Dibos and Yessica, the last artists of the night came before Cristian De La Fuente to hear the results of the public's votes. Diego was saved and sang "Mañana Mañana", Ana Isabelle, the last person saved from last night, sang "Yo Te Recuerdo" and Yessica, meanwhile was in danger of being eliminated. Saved artists supported Fedro who sang "Yo No Nací Para Amar". By having the most votes by the public, Yessica remained in the competition and sang "Hasta Que Te Conocí". And so Barbara had to be eliminated since she was the person who had the least of votes from the public.

- Eliminated: Barbara
- Saved by the judges for next week: Fedro
- Song sang were originally from: Juan Gabriel

=== Episode 7 ===
Premiered October 11, 2009

The first to appear on stage were Zone D 'Tambora, Ojeda, and Sergio Antonio. The group Zone D'Tambora was the first who begin to breathe easiest because they were saved by the public and opened the stage with the song "Tu Carcel". Ojeda followed the Puerto Ricans, who was also saved, and sang "Amor Secreto" from Sergio Antonio but did not have the same fate and was the first artist to reach the danger zone. Fedro, who was saved last week, was awarded a trip to Los Angeles to meet Jenni Rivera, who gave a day of guidance and support. Onstage, Fedro sang "La Plaga". It was Cristina's, Diego's, and Paco De Maria turn to know their fate. Cristina was saved and sang "Entrégate"; Diego Dibós also received support from the public and sang "El Día Que Me Quieras", Paco de Maria did not have the necessary number of votes from the public and accompanied Sergio in the danger zone. Recently arrived onstage were Yessica, Anna Isabelle and Donnatella. Ana Isabelle was saved by the votes of the public and sang "Algo Más", Yessica did remain in the competition and sang "Simplemente Amigos"; Donnatella was not among the artists who were favored by the public for the third time, was in danger of being eliminated. In addition to sharing with the panel of judges and giving their opinion after each of the presentations of artists, Pee Wee took the stage to delight the viewers with his rhythm. Sergio Antonio sang "Yo No Me Doy Por Vencido", Paco de María and Donnatella faced the public's votes to see who had more, and Paco stayed in the competition and he sang "Voy A Apagar La Luz". To leave the stage of ¡Viva el Sueño!, Donnatella performed a song titled "Cuando me vaya".

- Eliminated: Donnatella
- Saved by the judges for next week: Sergio Antonio
- Guest Star: Pee Wee

=== Episode 8 ===
Premiered October 18, 2009

While Sergio Antonio was breathing calmly in the balcony, having been protected of the judges last week, his eight companions descended the stage to hear his fate. First to sing was Anna Isabelle, who sang "Las Avispas", Yessica followed with the song "Como Tu Mujer" and Zone D'Tambora was the first artist to sit in the danger zone. Cristina, Diego, and Fedro came out on stage to know their fate. Diego Dibós was supported by the public and sang "Si No Te Hubieras Ido"; Cristina was also saved by the votes of audience and sang "Como Fui A Enamorarme De Ti". Fedro did not have public support and was in danger of being eliminated. Los Horoscopos de Durango were invited to the Viva el Sueño! scenario to share a little with artists and to delight with their song "La Noche Que Te Fuiste". Paco and Ojeda fought for the last pass of the night. The public supported Ojeda, who sang "Visa Para Un Sueño", while Paco de María was in danger of being eliminated. Sergio Antonio, being the protégé of the week, had the opportunity to meet Laura Pausini who gave an afternoon of guidance and support for your next presentation. As if this were not enough, upon arriving home, he encountered another pleasant surprise. His mother was waiting and she even cooked a rich dish. Sergio Antonio took the stage and sang "Bachata Rosa". Fedro, Paco and Zone D 'Tambora were in the danger zone and the artists saved by the public rescued one of them. The lucky was Fedro who shared the messages he has received on Univision.com and sang "Basta Ya". Paco de María and Zone D'Tambora battled for the votes from the public and for having the most votes, the Puerto Ricans [Zone D 'Tambora] stayed in the competition and sang "Burbujas De Amor", Paco de Maria said goodbye to the competition but before leaving, he sang "Donde Estará Mi Primera". The judges, as every week, had the opportunity to protect one of the participants and this time the judges gave her a week of tranquility to Yessica.

- Eliminated: Paco de Maria
- Saved by the judges for next week: Yessica
- Song sang were originally from: Marco Antonio Solís, Juan Luis Guerra
- Guest Star: Laura Pausini & Los Horóscopos de Durango

=== Episode 9 ===
Premiered October 25, 2009

To kick off the round of eliminations, Ana Isabelle, Zone D'Tambora, Cristina and came out on stage to know their fate. The first saved of the evening were Zone D'Tambora, who celebrated alongside their parents this new victory, then sang "Te Regalo Amores". Ana Isabelle was also saved by the votes of the public and sang "Preciosa". Cristina, for the first time was in the danger zone. For being saved last week, Yessica received an afternoon of guidance and support with Lupillo Rivera and she sang "Víveme". It was turn for Diego and Ojeda to know if the public had supported them with their vote. The fate accompanied Ojeda who sang "Por Ella", while Diego went to the danger zone. Between Fedro and Sergio, was the last artist of the night and the one who was going to be saved from being in danger of being eliminated. Fedro was supported by the public and sang "Volverte A Amar". Sergio Antonio was in danger of being eliminated.The guest artist for the evening was David Bisbal, who after advising participants to keep in mind to win, also advised them to take advantage of having a camera in front of them. The Spanish singer sang Esclavo De Tus Besos on the stage of Viva el Sueño!. Artists saved had the opportunity to save one of those who were in the danger zone. By unanimous decision, Diego was saved by his teammates and sang "Dame Una Señal". Cristina and Sergio Antonio fought for last place in the night and for having the most votes by the public, Cristina was able to continue in the competition. She sang "Costumbres". Carolina Guerra took the stage to say the name of the artist who was protected by the judges and, this time the lucky one was lucky Fedro. Before leaving the stage of Viva el Sueño, Sergio Antonio asked his companions to not be sad and he said that he hadn't died. To end the program, Sergio sang an own song entitled Millones De Cosas.

- Eliminated: Sergio Antonio
- Saved by the judges for next week: Fedro
- Guest Star: David Bisbal

=== Episode 10 ===
Premiered November 1, 2009

The night started with a gender war and as prize winners receive a trip to Las Vegas to see the Latin Grammy and walk the red carpet. The first to sing were the women. They sang a song by Anais, "Lo Que Son Las Cosas" and men sang "Tantita Pena" by Alejandro Fernández. Although there were some disagreement between the judges, two groups received good reviews. Chiquibaby called the three women the three musketeers and Enrique Santos called the men, the Fantastic Seven. In the end, thanks to which the public is involved, the judges scored a draw and all participants are prepared to travel to Las Vegas. For being protected by the judges last week, Fedro had an afternoon of guidance and support of Angélica Vale. For the singer, it was a surprise because Angelica was among the first people who trusted him early in his career. Fedro took the stage to sing El Ultimo Viernes by Espinoza Paz. All the artists came down to the stage to hear the public's vote. Cristina was the first saved by public's vote and sang Una Noche Mas by Jennifer Lopez. Zone D 'Tambora did not have the public's support and thus passed into the danger zone. The public, however, did vote for Ana Isabelle and her challenge was to interpret a song by band: "Culpable O Inocente" by Jenni Rivera. Paulina Rubio came as a special guest to the Viva el Sueño scenario to sing "Ni Rosas Ni Juguetes" de from her album "Gran City Pop". After several weeks of mystery about gold content of the judges, Chiquibaby announced they would give a second chance to a participant who already left the competition. But, the artist won't be named until next week. Ojeda, Diego and Yessica were next. Among them was only one who would be saved and the other two would go to the danger zone. The lucky one was Ojeda to the challenge of the week he sang "Como Fue" by José José. Zone D 'Tambora, Yessica and Diego were in the danger zone and Cristian de la Fuente announced that starting this week there will be no rescue by peers, they only tell the public vote. The members of Zone D 'Tambora received the most votes and therefore remained in the competition and sang "Entra En Mi Vida" by Sin Bandera. Diego and Yessica were with nerves and fought over the votes of the public. The public supported Diego and so, for Yessica, the end came in Viva el Sueño. The Peruvian took the stage, dressed like a cowboy to sing "Por Amarte" by Pepe Aguilar. Carolina Guerra came to give the name of the last protected judges as early as next week, judges will not protect any artist and fight in a dogfight for the votes of the public. The members of Zone D 'Tambora judges fell in love and so were chosen as the protégés of the night. To leave the show, Yessica sang "Ojala Que Llueva Café" by Juan Luis Guerra.

- Eliminated: Yessica(best performer)
- Saved by the judges for next week: Zone D 'Tambora
- Guest Star: Paulina Rubio

=== Episode 11 ===
Premiered on November 8, 2009

- Eliminated: No Elimination
- Saved by the judges for next week:
- Returned: Sergio
- Song sang were originally from: Selena
- Guest Star: Lupillo Rivera

=== Episode 12 ===
Premiered November 15, 2009

- Eliminated: No Elimination
- Saved by the judges for next week:
- Song sang were originally from:
- Guest Star: Anahí

=== Episode 13 ===
To be aired on November 22, 2009

- Winners: Ana Isabelle
- Saved by the judges for next week:
- Song sang were originally from:
- Guest Star: Alejandro Fernández, Luis Fonsi

== See also ==
- Cantando por un sueño
- Bailando por un Sueño
- American Idol
