= Mobile virtual network operator =

Wireless telecom service reseller

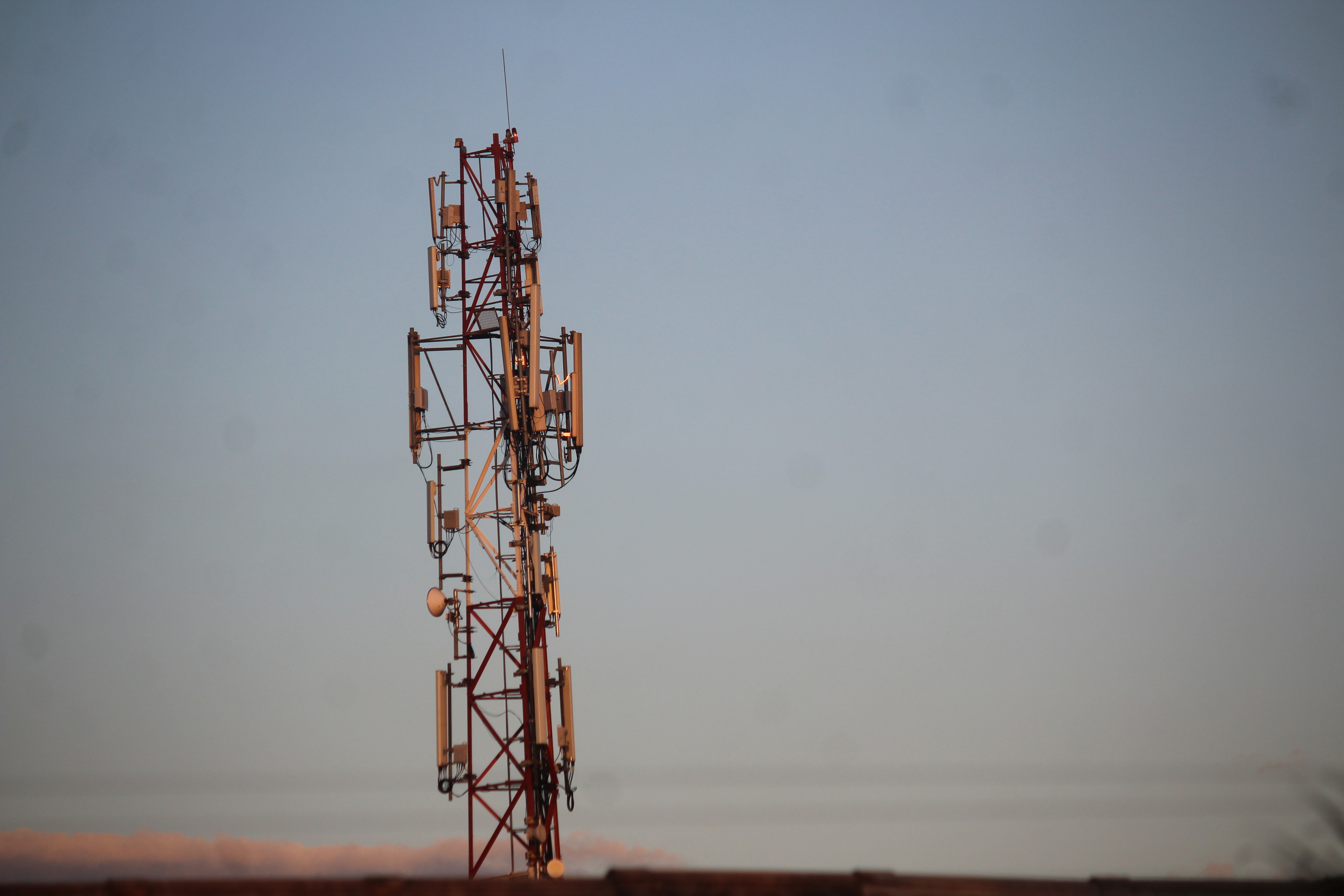
An MVNO does not own spectrum or network infrastructure. Instead, it pays for network capacity access from a Mobile Network Operator (MNO) at wholesale rates, allowing it to resell services under its own brand.

A mobile virtual network operator (MVNO) is a mobile telephony service provider that does not own the cellular network infrastructure over which it provides services to its customers. An MVNO enters into a business agreement with a mobile network operator (MNO) to obtain bulk access to network services at wholesale rates, then sets retail prices independently. Both MVNOs and MNOs are mobile phone operators. An MVNO may use its own customer service, billing support systems, marketing, and sales personnel, or it could employ the services of a mobile virtual network enabler (MVNE).

Several MVNO brands have a presence in multiple countries, either as subsidiaries, joint ventures, or through brand licensing agreements with local entity partners.

== History ==
MVNO agreements with network operators date back to the 1990s, when the European and Australian telecom markets saw market liberalization, new regulatory frameworks, better 2G network technology, and a subsequent jump in wireless subscriber numbers. Though the new 2G networks more efficiently managed the limited frequency bands allocated to wireless service, new mobile entrants were still limited by their ability to access frequency bands in a restricted spectrum.

With European markets newly open to competition and new technology enabling better service and cheaper handsets, there was a massive surge in demand for cellular phones. In the midst of this swell, Sense Communications fought for access to MNO spectrum in Scandinavia in 1997. Sense was able to establish an MVNO agreement with Sonera in Finland, but it failed to persuade MNOs in Sweden, Denmark, and Norway. Sense then appealed to EU regulators, citing provisions that required certain MNOs to allow new entrants interconnection. While Sense's claim was denied, in November 1999, the company signed a service provider agreement with Telia/Telenor Mobile for GSM network capacity access, allowing Sense to offer services to its own customers in Sweden and Norway.

Despite Sense's initial failure, the regulator in Denmark saw the promise in the MVNO model as a cost-effective route for telecom companies to enter the market and in May 2000, legislation passed that required network operators with significant market power to open up access to their infrastructure. By August of that same year, the MNO Sonofon had solidified the first viable MVNO agreement with Tele2. This agreement provided Tele2 with access to Sonofon's network for both mobile and roaming services, the latter of which had been requested by (and denied to) Sense Communications. With the new regulations in place, MVNOs in Scandinavia eventually grew to a market share of above 10%.

By 2008, US wireless subscribers had a choice between around 40 MVNOs. According to the FCC, approximately 7% of all U.S. mobile subscribers were served by resellers, including MVNOs, and analysts found that the 15.1 million wireless subscribers served by resellers by the end of 2006 had increased by 1.6 million over the previous year.

== Types ==
MVNOs are distinguished by their commitment to owning and managing the operational components of the MVNO business model, consisting of:

- Access to basic network infrastructure, like base stations, transceivers, home location registers, and switching centres.
- Service packaging, pricing, and billing systems, including value-added services like voicemail and missed call notifications.
- Consumer-facing aspects like sales, marketing, and customer relationship management activities like customer care and dispute resolution.

Because MVNOs are effectively defined by their lack of spectrum licenses, an MVNO necessarily will need to have agreements in place to access the network of at least one MNO. The type of MVNO is determined by how "thick" or "thin" a technological layer an MVNO adds over its access to its host MNO's network.

=== Branded reseller ===
Sometimes referred to as a "Skinny MVNO" or Reseller. A Branded Reseller, will either operate under its own brand or co-branded with the mobile network operator (MNO). In most cases, the branded reseller brings a brand, distribution channels and/or a large existing customer base to the table, from which it can leverage its sales. It is often the easiest MVNO type for a host network operator (HNO) to accept, as the HNO stays in control over most of the processes. The Reseller MVNO possesses no core elements and only holds the means that ensure the contact and relationship with the customers.

=== Thin MVNO ===
Sometimes referred to as a "Light MVNO" or "Service provider MVNO". The Thin MVNO, provides its own brand and is normally responsible for the customer support, billing processes, tariffs, bundles and promotion packages, costs of marketing, sales and distribution, as well as the OPEX and CAPEX associated with these.

=== Medium MVNO ===
Sometimes referred to as a "Enhanced Service Provider". The Medium MVNO, operates under its own brand with its own SIM cards, marketing, sales, distribution, and can in some countries obtain its own numbering range/mobile network code. The Medium MVNO has the ability to set tariff bundles and packages independently from the retail prices set by the host network operator (MNO). It can add its own value added services (VAS) platform to upsell or differentiate from the competition, on apps, data, and content services.

=== Full MVNO ===
The Full MVNO is responsible for, and has full control over all the services and products it offers in the market, as well as flexibility in designing and deploying new services, either to end-users or for Internet of Things (IoT) / Machine-to-machine (M2M). It operates technically, in a similar way to a mobile network operator, but without spectrum and radio access network (RAN), which it still leases access to from a mobile network operator (MNO).

The Full MVNO has a switching and transmission infrastructure allowing the management of its traffic. It can administer numbering resources, customer service, VAS, Roaming, SIM and device management and other services required for the provision of mobile services.

== Service providers ==
=== Overview and growth ===
As of June 2014, 943 MVNOs and 255 MNO sub-brands were active worldwide, totaling almost 1,200 mobile service providers hosted by MNOs, up from 1,036 in 2012. According to GSMA Intelligence, between June 2010 and June 2015, the number of MVNOs worldwide increased by 70 percent, reaching 1,017 in June 2015.

As of December 2018, there were 1,300 active MVNOs operating in 80 countries, representing more than 220 million mobile connections—approximately 2.46% of the total 8.9 billion mobile connections in the world. The eight countries with the largest number of active MVNOs in 2018 were: the US with 139 MVNOs (4.7% market share), Germany with 135 (19.5% market share), Japan 83 (10.6%), UK 77 (15.9%), Australia 66 (13.1%), Spain 63 (11.5%), France 53 (11.2%) and Denmark 49 (34.6%).

At the end of year 2022, there were 1,986 active MVNOs globally, more than double the amount of traditional telecom network operators. Europe lead in terms of most active MVNOs in operation with 1,012, representing half of the total global MVNO market. It is followed by Americas with 379 MVNOs, Asia with 322, International with 131, Oceania with 84, Africa with 54 and Middle East with 5.

As of August 2025, the number of MVNOs in operation had grown to 2,138, with 283 more expected soon. While the number of traditional Mobile Network Operators (MNOs) has remained relatively stable (hovering between 850 and 950 globally), this growth results in approximately 2.38 MVNOs for every MNO worldwide. MVNOs are currently found in 100 markets. Europe (1,056 MVNOs) and the Asia-Pacific (369 MVNOs) region continue to dominate the market share. Latin America (224 MVNOs) has seen significant growth, expanding at least fivefold over the past 10 years. Top 10 MVNO Markets include the US (179 MVNOs), Germany (136 MVNOs), UK (110 MVNOs), Japan (100 MVNOs), and Mexico (95 MVNOs).

=== Multinational MVNOs ===
Some MVNO brands have a presence in multiple countries, either as subsidiaries, joint ventures, or through brand licensing agreements with local partners, e.g. Lycamobile, Virgin Mobile, Lebara, CMLink, Tesco Mobile, and Aldi Talk.

=== Africa ===
==== Uganda ====
In Uganda, three MVNOs have been registered so far, some having their own network infrastructure within major cities, but acting as an MVNO out of these cities.

==== South Africa ====
In South Africa, the MVNO market has been driven by retailers and banks. In 2015, one of the "big five" banks, FNB, created an MVNO named FNB Connect providing voice, SMS and data services. As of 31 December 2019, FNB Connect had around 670,000 subscribers. The service makes use of Cell C network infrastructure. The move came not necessarily to compete in the telecommunications market, but to offer a greater value to customers of the banking division. There have been several banks in South Africa making this move, like Standard Bank's SB Mobile established in 2019.

==== Nigeria ====
In Nigeria, the MVNO era began in late 2025 with the commercial launch of Vitel Wireless as the nation's first fully-fledged Mobile Virtual Network Operator (MVNO), introducing its 0712 number series. Vitel Wireless operates by leveraging the existing infrastructure of MTN. This launch followed years of regulatory hurdles after the Nigerian Communications Commission (NCC) issued over 45 MVNO licenses, signaling a push for greater competition.

==== Kenya ====
In Kenya, the MVNO market is largely characterized by a telco-finance convergence model. Equitel, a mobile virtual network operator (MVNO) and wholly-owned subsidiary of Equity Group Holdings (Equity Bank), is a major player, leveraging the Airtel Kenya network. Equitel focuses on integrating banking and mobile services, and in February 2024, it became one of the first MVNO in Africa to roll out 5G services.

=== Asia ===
==== Japan ====
Japan has about 80 MVNO brands, and the market share of MVNOs is 12.2% in 2019. The total number of contractors is 22.3 million.

==== Vietnam ====
As of March 2025, Vietnam had six MVNO providers using the networks of the two mobile network operators VinaPhone and MobiFone. The six MVNOs are: iTel (Indochina Telecom), Wintel (Mobicast/Masan Group), myLocal (ASIM Telecom), VNSKY (VNPAY), FPT SIM (FPT Retail), and SkyX (Leeon Group).

=== Europe ===
==== United Kingdom ====
The UK had 77 active MVNOs as of December 2018. The MVNOs combined market share was 15.9% of the total UK mobile market, representing 15.3 million connections.

==== Ireland ====
Ireland has seven active MVNO brands as of February 2021, and the market share of MVNOs in 2022 is 13.4%.

=== Americas ===
==== United States ====
The three US national carriers have partial or full ownership of several large MVNO brands, such as Cricket Wireless (AT&T); TracFone Wireless and Visible by Verizon (Verizon); and Mint Mobile and Metro by T-Mobile (T-Mobile).Multinational MVNOs

== Industry legal regulations ==
=== Africa ===
==== Nigeria ====
In Nigeria, the licensing of telecommunications operators is overseen by the Nigerian Communications Commission (NCC). As of July 2024, the NCC had issued 46 Mobile Virtual Network Operator (MVNO) licenses. As part of its regulatory framework, the NCC reclassified telecommunications licences into class and individual licences. This regulatory structure ensures that all telecom service providers, including MVNOs, comply with national guidelines and operate within the appropriate legal framework for their respective services.

=== Americas ===
==== Brazil ====
In Brazil, MVNOs are regulated by Anatel, the Brazilian Agency of Telecommunications, in November 2010. As of September 2014 the combined market share of all Brazilian MVNOs was just 0.04%.

=== Asia ===
==== India ====
In India, the Telecom Department under the Ministry of Communications and Information Technology, accepted a recommendation from the national telecom regulator, Telecom Regulatory Authority of India, to permit VNOs in the country, and announced the grant of a unified license for Virtual Network Operators on 31 May 2016. VNOs have formed an association to represent current regulatory issues impacting their MVNO business viability.

==== Jordan ====
Jordan's top watchdog issued its first MVNO regulations in 2008, facilitating the creation of the first MVNO in the Arab world in 2010.

==== Saudi Arabia ====
In 2015 the Saudi government made preparations to permit MVNO services in the country. MVNO providers include Virgin Mobile Saudi Arabia.

==== Thailand ====
The MVNO market in Thailand has faced severe challenges due to regulatory issues and failure to enforce network access rules. In 2009, five MVNOs were originally licensed to operate on the 2100 MHz 3G network of state telecom service TOT Public Company Limited (TOT). The vast majority of licensed MVNOs have failed to launch or sustain operations.

As of August 2025, the remaining domestic MVNOs had ceased operations. This collapse has been attributed to the National Broadcasting and Telecommunications Commission's (NBTC) failure to enforce regulations requiring dominant Mobile Network Operators (MNOs) to allocate capacity and provide fair access, leading to an effectively non-competitive market dominated by the remaining major carriers. Despite this, the NBTC announced plans in early 2024 to create four new regional MVNOs by 2026, including a scheme called "One Region, One Mobile Virtual Network Operator," with plans to limit MNO ownership in these new entities to a maximum of 25%.

=== Europe ===
In 2003, the European Commission issued a recommendation to national telecom regulators to examine the competitiveness of the market for wholesale access and call origination on public mobile telephone networks. The study resulted in new regulations from regulators in several countries, including Ireland and France forcing operators to open up their networks to MVNOs.

== Global wireless infrastructure providers ==
- American Tower
- Crown Castle
- Zayo Group

== See also ==
- Voice over LTE
- Generic Access Network
- Competitive local exchange carrier
- List of mobile network operators
- Network Unaffiliated Virtual Operator (NUVO)
