= List of number-one songs of 2009 (Mexico) =

This is a list of the songs that reached number one in Mexico in 2009, according to Monitor Latino.

Monitor Latino's chart rankings are based on airplay across radio states in Mexico utilizing the Radio Tracking Data, LLC in real time. Charts are ranked from Monday to Sunday. Besides the General chart, Monitor Latino published "Pop", "Regional Mexican" and "Anglo" charts.

== Chart history ==
=== General ===
In 2009, eight songs reached number one on the General chart, the lowest amount for a full year since the chart was founded in 2007; all of these songs were entirely in Spanish. Five acts achieved their first General number-one song in Mexico: La 5ª Estación, Paulina Rubio, Shakira, La Arrolladora Banda El Limón and David Bisbal.

"Loba" by Shakira was the longest-running General number-one of the year, staying at the top position for fourteen consecutive weeks, and "Te presumo" by Banda El Recodo was best-performing song of the year.

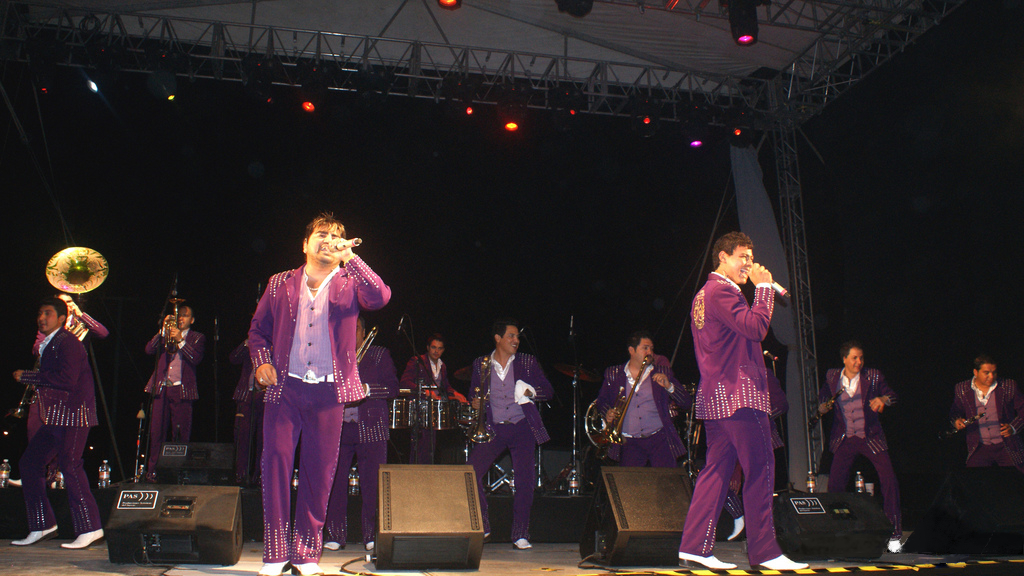
Banda El Recodo (pictured) had two General #1 songs throughout the year.

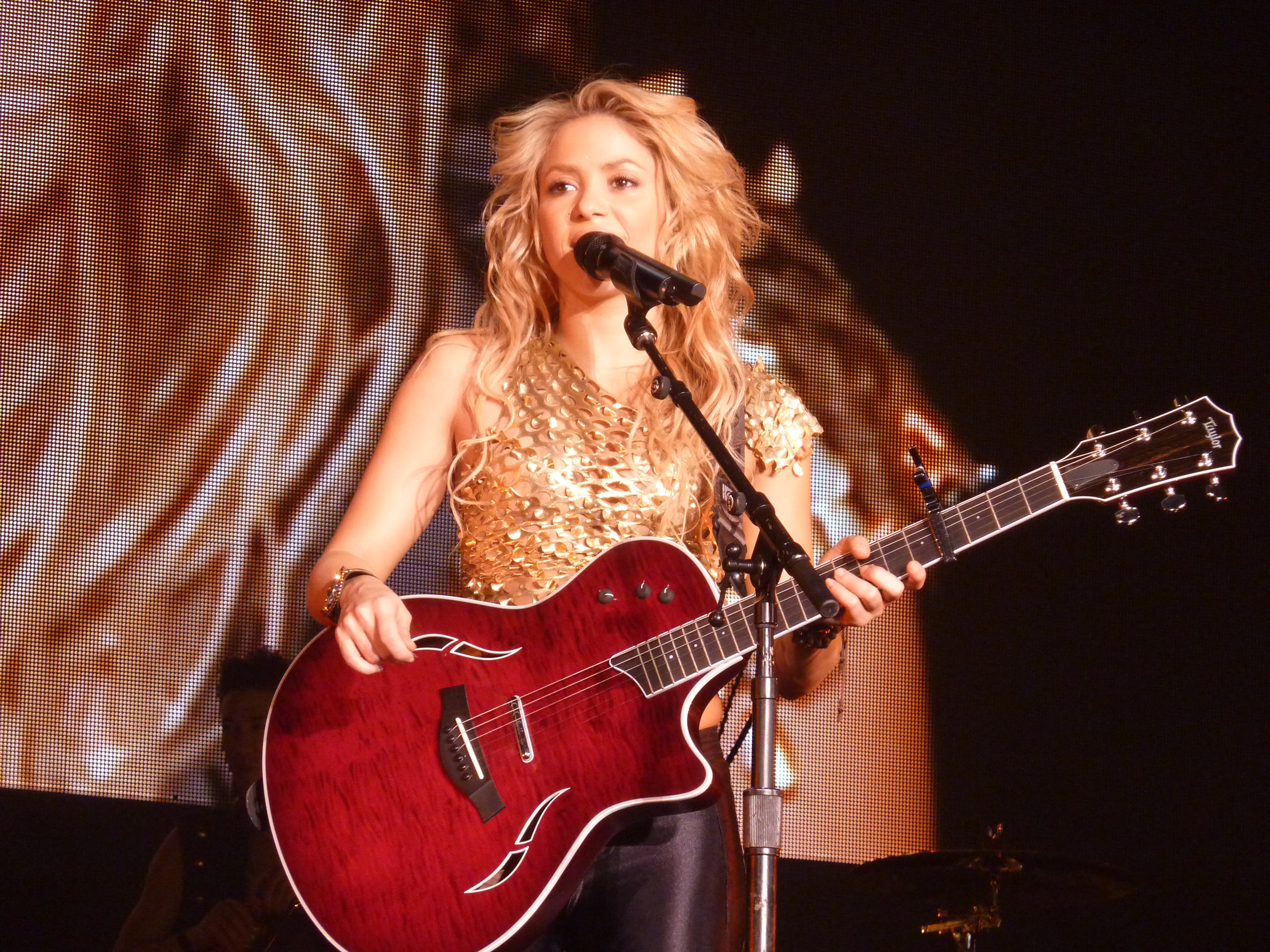
"Loba" by Shakira (pictured) topped the General chart for 14 consecutive weeks.

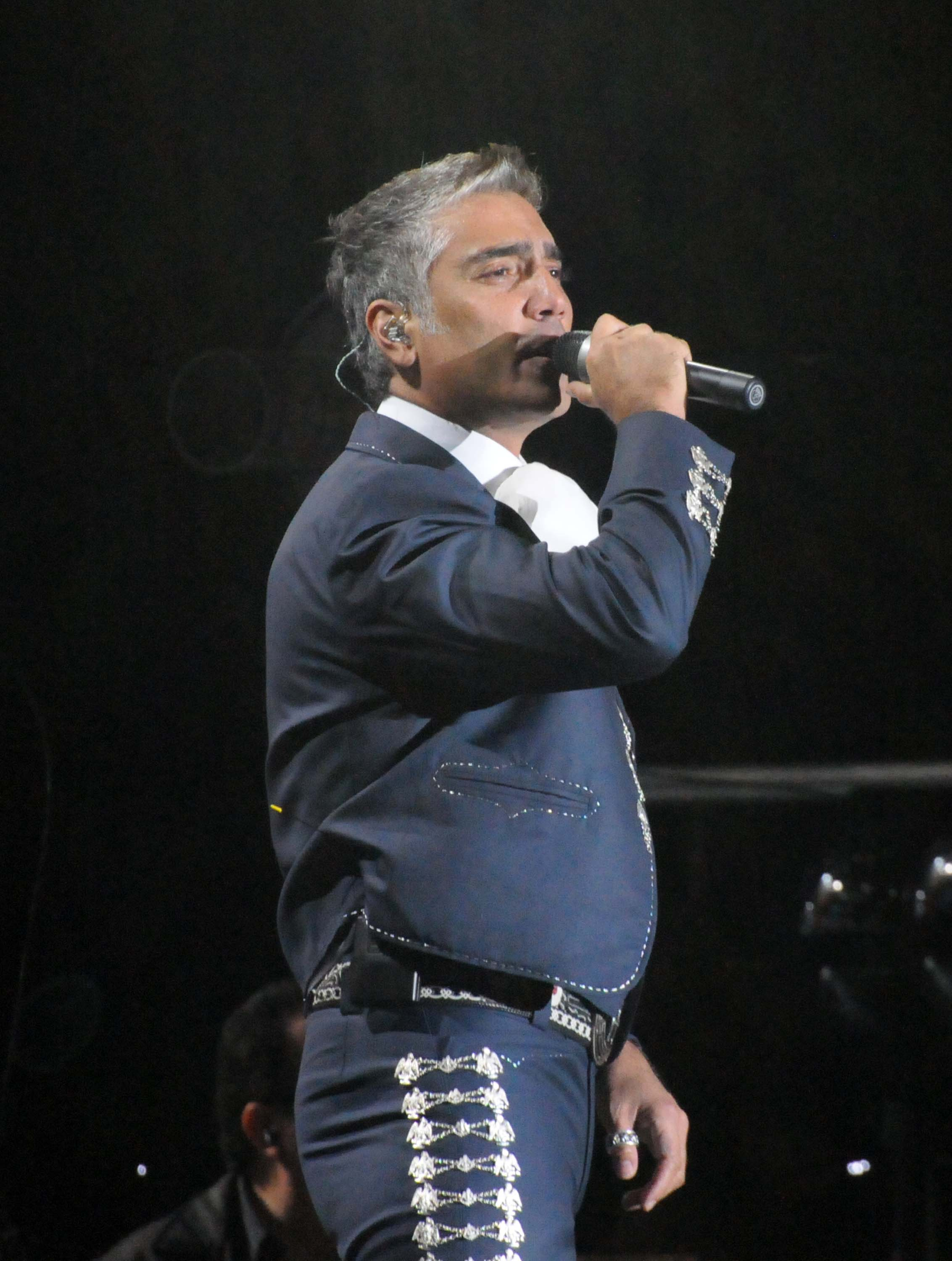
Mexican singer Alejandro Fernández (pictured) simultaneously topped the General, Pop and Regional charts with two different songs ("Estuve" and "Se me va la voz").

The yellow background indicates the best-performing song of 2009.

Issue date	Song	Artist(s)	Ref.
January 4	"Te presumo"	Banda el Recodo	
January 11	"Te presumo"	Banda el Recodo	
January 18	"Te presumo"	Banda el Recodo	
January 25	"Te presumo"	Banda el Recodo	
February 1	"Te presumo"	Banda el Recodo	
February 8	"Te presumo"	Banda el Recodo	
February 15	"Te presumo"	Banda el Recodo	
February 22	"Te presumo"	Banda el Recodo	
March 1	"Te presumo"	Banda el Recodo	
March 8	"Te presumo"	Banda el Recodo	
March 15	"Te presumo"	Banda el Recodo	
March 22	"Te presumo"	Banda el Recodo	
March 29	"Que te quería"	La 5ª Estación	
April 5	"Que te quería"	La 5ª Estación	
April 12	"Que te quería"	La 5ª Estación	
May 10	"Que te quería"	La 5ª Estación	
May 17	"Que te quería"	La 5ª Estación	
May 24	"Causa y efecto"	Paulina Rubio	
May 31	"Causa y efecto"	Paulina Rubio	
June 7	"Causa y efecto"	Paulina Rubio	
June 14	"Causa y efecto"	Paulina Rubio	
June 21	"Causa y efecto"	Paulina Rubio	
June 28	"Causa y efecto"	Paulina Rubio	
July 5	"Causa y efecto"	Paulina Rubio	
July 12	"Causa y efecto"	Paulina Rubio	
July 19	"Loba"	Shakira	
July 26	"Loba"	Shakira	
August 2	"Loba"	Shakira	
August 9	"Loba"	Shakira	
August 16	"Loba"	Shakira	
August 23	"Loba"	Shakira	
August 30	"Loba"	Shakira	
September 6	"Loba"	Shakira	
September 13	"Loba"	Shakira	
September 20	"Loba"	Shakira	
September 27	"Loba"	Shakira	
October 4	"Loba"	Shakira	
October 11	"Loba"	Shakira	
October 18	"Loba"	Shakira	
October 25	"Me gusta todo de ti"	Banda El Recodo	
November 1	"La calabaza"	La Arrolladora Banda El Limón	
November 8	"Esclavo de sus besos"	David Bisbal	
November 15	"Esclavo de sus besos"	David Bisbal	
November 22	"Esclavo de sus besos"	David Bisbal	
November 29	"Esclavo de sus besos"	David Bisbal	
December 6	"Estuve"	Alejandro Fernández	
December 13	"Estuve"	Alejandro Fernández	
December 20	"Estuve"	Alejandro Fernández	
December 27	"Estuve"	Alejandro Fernández	

=== Pop ===
Issue date	Song	Artist(s)	Ref.
January 4	"Se te olvidó"	Kalimba	
January 11	"Se te olvidó"	Kalimba	
January 18	"Se te olvidó"	Kalimba	
January 25	"Se te olvidó"	Kalimba	
March 15	"Que te quería"	La 5ª Estación	
March 22	"Que te quería"	La 5ª Estación	
March 29	"Que te quería"	La 5ª Estación	
April 5	"Que te quería"	La 5ª Estación	
April 12	"Que te quería"	La 5ª Estación	
May 10	"Que te quería"	La 5ª Estación	
May 17	"Que te quería"	La 5ª Estación	
May 24	"Causa y efecto"	Paulina Rubio	
May 31	"Causa y efecto"	Paulina Rubio	
June 7	"Causa y efecto"	Paulina Rubio	
June 14	"Causa y efecto"	Paulina Rubio	
June 21	"Causa y efecto"	Paulina Rubio	
June 28	"Causa y efecto"	Paulina Rubio	
July 5	"Causa y efecto"	Paulina Rubio	
July 12	"Causa y efecto"	Paulina Rubio	
August 2	"Loba"	Shakira	
August 9	"Loba"	Shakira	
September 20	"Loba"	Shakira	
September 27	"Loba"	Shakira	
October 18	"Loba"	Shakira	
October 25	"Loba"	Shakira	
November 1	"Looking for Paradise"	Alejandro Sanz ft. Alicia Keys	
November 22	"Esclavo de sus besos"	David Bisbal	
November 29	"Se me va la voz"	Alejandro Fernández	
December 6	"Mientes"	Camila	
December 13	"Se me va la voz"	Alejandro Fernández	
December 20	"Mientes"	Camila	
December 27	"Mientes"	Camila	

=== Regional ===
Issue date	Song	Artist(s)	Ref.
January 4	"Te presumo"	Banda el Recodo	
January 11	"Te presumo"	Banda el Recodo	
January 18	"Te presumo"	Banda el Recodo	
January 25	"Te presumo"	Banda el Recodo	
March 15	"Te presumo"	Banda el Recodo	
March 22	"Te presumo"	Banda el Recodo	
March 29	"Te presumo"	Banda el Recodo	
April 5	"Te presumo"	Banda el Recodo	
April 12	"Te presumo"	Banda el Recodo	
May 17	"Ya es muy tarde"	La Arrolladora Banda El Limón	
May 24	"Ya es muy tarde"	La Arrolladora Banda El Limón	
June 7	"Ya es muy tarde"	La Arrolladora Banda El Limón	
June 14	"Ya es muy tarde"	La Arrolladora Banda El Limón	
June 21	"Ya es muy tarde"	La Arrolladora Banda El Limón	
June 28	"Ya es muy tarde"	La Arrolladora Banda El Limón	
July 5	"Ya es muy tarde"	La Arrolladora Banda El Limón	
July 12	"Ya es muy tarde"	La Arrolladora Banda El Limón	
August 9	"Que me digan loco"	La Original Banda El Limón	
September 27	"La calabaza"	La Arrolladora Banda El Limón	
October 18	"Me gusta todo de ti"	Banda el Recodo	
October 25	"Me gusta todo de ti"	Banda el Recodo	
November 1	"La calabaza"	La Arrolladora Banda El Limón	
November 22	"Me gusta todo de ti"	Banda el Recodo	
November 29	"Me gusta todo de ti"	Banda el Recodo	
December 6	"Me gusta todo de ti"	Banda el Recodo	
December 20	"Estuve"	Alejandro Fernández	
December 27	"Me gusta todo de ti"	Banda el Recodo	

=== English ===
Issue date	Song	Artist(s)	Ref.
January 4	"Hot n Cold"	Katy Perry	
January 11	"Hot n Cold"	Katy Perry	
January 18	"Hot n Cold"	Katy Perry	
January 25	"Hot n Cold"	Katy Perry	
March 15	"Circus"	Britney Spears	
March 22	"My Life Would Suck Without You"	Kelly Clarkson	
March 29	"My Life Would Suck Without You"	Kelly Clarkson	
April 5	"My Life Would Suck Without You"	Kelly Clarkson	
April 12	"My Life Would Suck Without You"	Kelly Clarkson	
May 10	"Poker Face"	Lady Gaga	
May 17	"Poker Face"	Lady Gaga	
May 24	"Poker Face"	Lady Gaga	
May 31	"Poker Face"	Lady Gaga	
June 7	"Poker Face"	Lady Gaga	
June 14	"Poker Face"	Lady Gaga	
June 21	"Poker Face"	Lady Gaga	
June 28	"Poker Face"	Lady Gaga	
July 12	"Poker Face"	Lady Gaga	
August 2	"Poker Face"	Lady Gaga	
August 9	"I Know You Want Me (Calle Ocho)"	Pitbull	
September 27	"I Gotta Feeling"	The Black Eyed Peas	
October 18	"I Gotta Feeling"	The Black Eyed Peas	
October 25	"I Gotta Feeling"	The Black Eyed Peas	
November 1	"Looking for Paradise"	Alejandro Sanz ft. Alicia Keys	
November 22	"I Gotta Feeling"	The Black Eyed Peas	
November 29	"I Gotta Feeling"	The Black Eyed Peas	
December 6	"I Gotta Feeling"	The Black Eyed Peas	
December 13	"I Gotta Feeling"	The Black Eyed Peas	
December 20	"I Gotta Feeling"	The Black Eyed Peas	
December 27	"I Gotta Feeling"	The Black Eyed Peas	

== See also ==
- List of Top 20 songs for 2009 in Mexico
- List of number-one albums of 2009 (Mexico)
