= Raúl Brindis =

Mexican radio personality (born 1963)

Raúl Brindis (born August 17, 1963) is a Mexican radio and TV personality. His show, "El Show de Raul Brindis" runs weekday mornings on La Ley 92.1 fm in Houston, Texas. His show is broadcast through Glades Media Radio Group from 5:00 AM to 11:00 AM on La Musica App. Raul began his radio career in 1984.

== Early life ==
Brindis was born in Matamoros, Tamaulipas. He has a bachelor's degree in civil engineering from the Instituto Tecnologico de Matamoros.

== Career ==
In addition to being the host of Univision Radio's primary entertainment show in Central United States, Raul is an avid singer and songwriter. He has released several music and reflection albums under Mexican label Disa Records, part of Univision Music Group, including Las Más Solicitadas de la Radio (2003), Otra Noche Más Sin Tí (2004), and Reflexiones, Vol. 2: Las Más Solicitadas de la Radio (2006).

Raul Brindis served as a judge on Univision's ¡Viva el Sueño!, a reality competition to find new solo musical talent during the year 2009. He also served as guest judge in Univision's Objetivo Fama, a singing talent contest that has aired in Telefutura in the United States.

On 15 December 2023, his show, "El Show de Raul Brindis", ended its national broadcast transmission, a decision made by Univision for budgetary purposes. Brindis stated in social media that his show will soon be aired again, without providing further details as to which platform will be used for its broadcast.
