= Yessica =

Yessica is a female given name and may refer to:

- Yessica Chávez (born 1988), Mexican world champion boxer and International Boxing Hall of Famer.
- Yéssica Mouton (born 1987), Bolivian model who was crowned Miss Bolivia 2011, and competed in the 2012 Miss Universe
- Yessica Ramírez, who represented the Mexican state of Baja California in the national pageant Nuestra Belleza Mexico
- Yessica Salazar, woman from the Mexican state of Jalisco who competed in Nuestra Belleza Mexico and obtained the title of Miss Mexico World
