= List of number-one albums of 2009 (Mexico) =

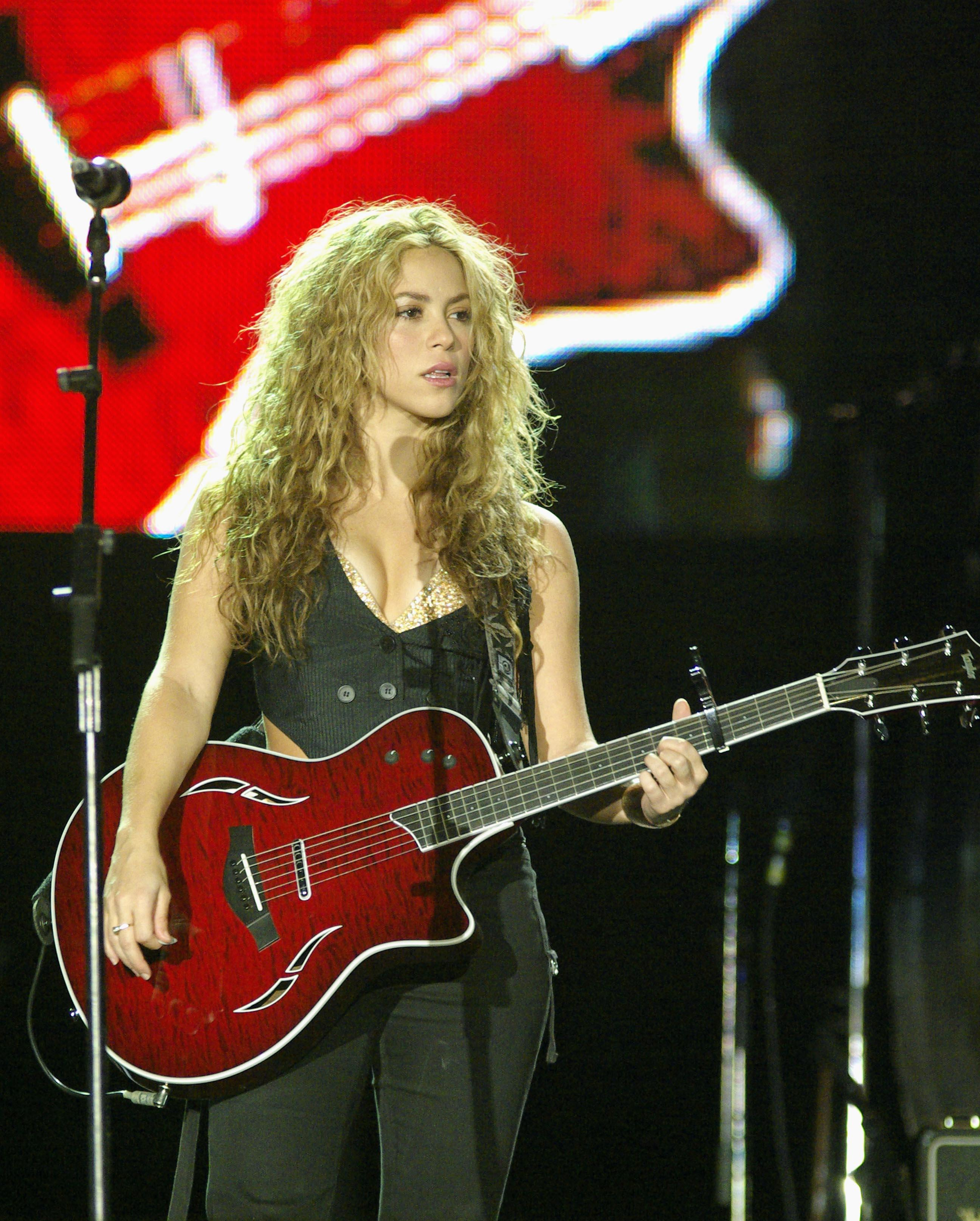
Colombian singer-songwriter Shakira peaked at number-one with her album Loba in 2009.

The highest-selling compact discs and music downloads in Mexico are ranked in the Top 100 Mexico record chart published weekly by AMPROFON (Asociación Mexicana de Productores de Fonogramas y Videogramas), a non-profit organization made up of Mexican and multinational record companies.

In 2009, 20 albums reached number one on the chart, including Primera Fila, a live album recorded by Vicente Fernández that spent seven non-consecutive weeks at the top, and won the Latin Grammy Award for Best Ranchero Album. Lines, Vines and Trying Times by Jonas Brothers and No Line on the Horizon by U2 peaked at number one in the Billboard 200 in the United States and also reached the top position of the Mexican chart. Shakira's seventh studio album Loba debuted at number one and was certified platinum in the first week of sales.

Wisin & Yandel and Alejandro Fernández released the most number one albums of the year with two each. Fernández released the compilation album De Noche: Clásicos a Mi Manera and the double album Dos Mundos. Dos Mundos includes Evolución, a pop music album, and Tradición, a ranchera music album; both albums debuted at the top two spots on this chart, and also in the Billboard Top Latin Albums chart in the United States. Thalía also peaked at the top of the chart with her first live album Primera Fila. The album is her first release with Sony Music Latin after 10 years signed with EMI, and features the singer performing with a 12-piece band.

Thriller 25, the 25th anniversary special-edition reissue of the album recorded by the American singer Michael Jackson in 1982, also reached number one after the singer's death on June 25, with the album also peaking at the top of the American digital sales charts. Madonna's third compilation album Celebration earned the top spot of the chart and received a platinum certification in México for sales of over 80,000 units. The soundtrack for the Mexican soap opera Atrévete a Soñar became the best-selling album of the year in the country.

== Albums ==
The yellow background indicates the best-performing album of 2009.

Chart date	Album	Artist	Reference
January 5	De Noche: Clásicos a Mi Manera	Alejandro Fernández	
January 12	De Noche: Clásicos a Mi Manera	Alejandro Fernández	
January 19	Primera Fila	Vicente Fernández	
January 26	Primera Fila	Vicente Fernández	
February 2	De Noche: Clásicos a Mi Manera	Alejandro Fernández	
February 9	Primera Fila	Vicente Fernández	
February 16	De Noche: Clásicos a Mi Manera	Alejandro Fernández	
February 23	The Bossa Masters	Various Artists	
March 2	Primera Fila	Vicente Fernández	
March 9	No Line on the Horizon	U2	
March 16	No Line on the Horizon	U2	
March 23	No Line on the Horizon	U2	
March 30	Primera Fila	Vicente Fernández	
April 6	Wisin & Yandel Presentan: La Mente Maestra	DJ Nesty and Wisin & Yandel	
April 13	Primera Fila	Vicente Fernández	
April 20	Isa TKM	Soundtrack	
April 27	Sounds of the Universe	Depeche Mode	
May 4	Atrévete a Soñar	Soundtrack	
May 11	Primera Fila	Vicente Fernández	
May 18	Atrévete a Soñar	Soundtrack	
May 25	Atrévete a Soñar	Soundtrack	
June 1	La Revolución	Wisin & Yandel	
June 8	La Revolución	Wisin & Yandel	
June 15	Atrévete a Soñar	Soundtrack	
June 22	Lines, Vines and Trying Times	Jonas Brothers	
June 29	Atrévete a Soñar	Soundtrack	
July 6	Thriller 25	Michael Jackson	
July 13	Thriller 25	Michael Jackson	
July 20	Thriller 25	Michael Jackson	
July 27	Thriller 25	Michael Jackson	
August 3	Thriller 25	Michael Jackson	
August 10	The Essential Michael Jackson	Michael Jackson	
August 17	La Revolución	Wisin & Yandel	
August 24	Atrévete a Soñar	Soundtrack	
August 31	Atrévete a Soñar	Soundtrack	
September 7	Fuerza Natural	Gustavo Cerati	
September 14	Atrévete a Soñar	Soundtrack	
September 21	Atrévete a Soñar	Soundtrack	
September 28	Poetics	Panda	
October 5	Celebration	Madonna	
October 12	Nada es Color de Rosa	Yuridia	
October 19	Loba	Shakira	
October 26	Loba	Shakira	
November 2	Loba	Shakira	
November 9	Loba	Shakira	
November 16	Paraíso Express	Alejandro Sanz	
November 23	Paraíso Express	Alejandro Sanz	
November 30	Paraíso Express	Alejandro Sanz	
December 7	Primera Fila	Thalía	
December 14	Dos Mundos: Evolución	Alejandro Fernández	
December 21	Dos Mundos: Evolución	Alejandro Fernández	
December 28	Dos Mundos: Evolución	Alejandro Fernández	

== See also ==
- List of number-one songs of 2009 (Mexico)
