= Network Unaffiliated Virtual Operator =

Virtual cellular data carrier

A Network Unaffiliated Virtual Operator (NUVO) is similar to a Mobile virtual network operator (MVNO) however it has one key difference — a NUVO is not affiliated with a specific carrier. NUVO's use real telephone numbers, and through these they combine with all other commercial operators, allowing NUVO users to communicate with anyone — not just other people who use a mobile App, for example.

By assigning telephone numbers to their users, NUVO's can transmit text messages and voice call to anyone who has a telephone number.

This allows an app user to communicate with anyone simply by dialing their phone number, rather than limiting their communications to just other app users, as most over the top content (OTT) apps do.

== See also ==
- MVNO
- Over the top content
- Mobile app
- Voice call
- Telephone number
- Onoff telecom
- Thumbtel
