= Ni Rosas Ni Juguetes =

- Original version cover

Single by Paulina Rubio

from the album Gran City Pop
- Released: August 17, 2009
- Recorded: 2008
- Genre: Latin pop; ranchero; hip-hop
- Length: 3:13
- Label: Universal Latino; Universal Spain; Int'l Latin America
- Songwriters: Claudia Brant; Noel Schajris; Gian Marco
- Producer: Cachorro López

Paulina Rubio singles chronology
"Causa y Efecto" (2009)	"Ni Rosas Ni Juguetes" (2009)	"Algo De Ti" (2010)

Pitbull singles chronology
"Future Love" (2009)	"Ni Rosas Ni Juguetes" (2009)	"Now You See It (Shake That Ass)" (2009)

Music videos
- "Ni Rosas, Ni Juguetes" (Video Oficial) on YouTube
- "Ni Rosas, Ni Juguetes" (Dúo Con Pitbull - Mr 305 Remix) on YouTube

Alternative covers
- Mr. 305 Remix feat. Pitbull cover

Alternative cover
- Banda version with Jenni Rivera cover

"Ni Rosas Ni Juguetes" (English: "Neither Roses Nor Toys") is a song recorded by Mexican recording artist Paulina Rubio for her ninth studio album Gran City Pop (2009). It was written by Claudia Brant, Noel Schajris and Gianmarco Zignago, and produced by Cachorro López. Due to popularity, the song was announced as the second single on July 20, 2009, released official worldwide on August 17, 2009 by Universal Music Latin Entertainment. "Ni Rosas Ni Juguetes" is a Latin pop song with ranchera and hip-hop influences. The song's lyrics discusses Rubio's decision to overcome a relationship and her empowerment.

The song received positive reviews from music critics who commended it for its production and lyrics, considering it as a feminist anthem. The song peaked at number one in Peru, and number three in Spain, certified platinum for 50,000 shipments. It performed successfully in the United States; it was a number ninth on the Billboard Hot Latin Songs chart. Universal Music released three alternate versions of "Ni Rosas Ni Juguetes"—a duet remix featuring Cuban-American rapper Pitbull, a banda version with Mexican-American singer Jenni Rivera, and a eurodance version with Spanish DJ and producer Juan Magán.

The first music video for the song was shot in New York, with a concept inspired by Hollywood film Mr. & Mrs. Smith (2005), and was released in October 2009. The second music video is like a narrative sequel, features Rubio and Pitbull in a room performing and dancing to the song. It was released in December 2009. Both music videos was directed by Jessy Terrero.

== Background ==
In June 2009, Rubio released her ninth studio album Gran City Pop. Achieving positive reviews from music critics, the album was a commercial success, peaking inside the top ten of many countries the Latin America. In the United States, the album debuted at number forty four on the Billboard 200, with first-week sales of over 9,400 copies. The lead single, "Causa Y Efecto", was released two months prior, and reached number-one on the Billboard Hot Latin Tracks for five weeks. In Spain, it was certified platinum.

Rubio confirmed that "Ni Rosas Ni Juguetes" would be released as the second single at the 6th Annual Premios Juventud on July 16, 2009. Previously, a poll was added to Rubio' official website to choose the second single, involving ten other songs from Gran City Pop. "Ni Rosas Ni Juguetes" was ahead of the other songs. Rubio explained that the song "is a tribute that I offer to my beautiful Mexico, where it also reflects how we women are in love."

== Critical reception ==
"Ni Rosas Ni Juguetes" received acclaimed reviews from most contemporary music critics. Phil Freeman from Allmusic highlighted the song as the most "surprising" and "high" of Gran City Pop, writing that "over a thunderous boom-bap beat, Rubio half-raps, half-sings about how flowers and toys won't earn her love; it's exactly the kind of culture-blending, boundary-dissolving sound that encapsulates modern Latin pop, and it's brilliant." Also, he said it could have been produced by Camilo Lara of Mexican Institute of Sound.

== Chart performance ==
"Ni Rosas Ni Juguetes" debuted at number 41 on the Hot Latin Songs chart and peaked at number 9, becoming Rubio's second top ten hit from the album. On the Latin Pop Songs chart it peaked at number 5.

In Spain, it debuted at number 37 on the singles chart and peaked at number 3, becoming her first top five hit from Gran City Pop in Spain. The song has been certified Platinum for sales of 40,000 copies in Spain. The single became a huge hit in Spain, charting for more than 40 weeks.

== Music videos ==
=== Original version ===
The accompanying music video for "Ni Rosas Ni Juguetes" was directed by Jessy Terrero, who is known for having previously collaborated with artists such as Puerto Rican reggaeton duo Wisin & Yandel and Carlos Santana among others, and was produced by John Nguyen. It was filmed in "a dream location overlooking the sea was used" on the outside in Bay Shore, New York, on August 26, 2009. The concept and video's story was inspired by Doug Liman's film Mr. & Mrs. Smith (2005), with Rubio and her partner, played by Bulgarian model Dian Hristov, being secret agents. Los 40 website compared Rubio's spy and sensual version to a modern-day Mata Hari.

The video begins with Rubio and her partner receiving couples therapy, with the psychologist asking them: "I get the impression that the subject of honesty makes you feel uncomfortable, are you honest with each other?" Rubio's image is immediately filtered in an armchair fiddling with the rhythm of the song. A flashback manifests itself during the intro. Afterwards, she sits in a fancy dressing room to look at herself in the mirror while singing and drinking a drink of Nuvo. She activates one of the spotlights in the mirror, which also functions as a digital computer and removes her partner from her contact list. The notification reaches him from his car. However, he tries to fix the breakup by bringing her a bouquet of red flowers. When he enters, Rubio breaks the flowers with a knife she used while chopping vegetables. She smiles wryly.

She continues singing the song while the psychologist listens to her. She makes signs of boredom and her partner gives her away. In the next scene, the two find themselves in a romantic situation drinking Nuvo and cuddling, but he spills a pill into Rubio's drink and she notices her. Finally, the psychologist smiles at their respective antics.

=== Mr. 305 Remix ===
Also known as "Pitbull Remix" —in reference to the collaboration with the American rapper— the music video for "Mr. 305 Remix" was directed by Jessy Terrero, just like the original version. On October 23, 2009, Universal Music Spain released a short video on its official YouTube account of Rubio, Pitbull and Terrero behind the scenes. Rubio later posted the same video on her official fan account PauPower.com, officially announcing the collaboration between her and Pitbull. It made its premiere on Telemundo's Al Rojo Vivo on January 18, 2010.

== Promotion ==
Rubio re-recorded "Ni Rosas Ni Juguetes" as a duet with the singer Jenni Rivera on a version in Banda, for promotion of the single on regional Mexican radio stations in the United States, Mexico and Puerto Rico and it was released on November 17, 2009. About her collaboration with the band music artist, she said: "Jenni has incredible human and vocal strength. Being able to collaborate with her and risk singing in another genre like band music has given me a lot of joy." It was also recorded as a remix with the rapper Pitbull called "Ni Rosas Ni Juguetes (Mr. 305 Remix)" and was released on November 10, 2009, via iTunes.

Rubio appeared at Los Premios MTV Latinoamérica 2009 on October 15 with Cobra Starship performing "Good Girls Go Bad" and "Ni Rosas Ni Juguetes". Rubio and Cobra Starship won an MTV Award for "Best Performance", as voted by the public, beating artists such as Shakira, Nelly Furtado, Ashley Tisdale and Wisin & Yandel. On November 1, Rubio performed "Ni Rosas Ni Juguetes" on ¡Viva el Sueño!, a reality competition show similar to American Idol. She also performed the single at the 2009 Premios OYE! in Guanajuato, Mexico. Rubio performed a "western" version of "Ni Rosas Ni Juguetes" at Premios Lo Nuestro on February 18, 2010.

== Other versions ==
Universal Music Latino released three alternate versions of "Ni Rosas Ni Juguetes". The first, a duet remix featuring Cuban-American rapper Pitbull, subtitled "Mr. 305 Remix" or "Pitbull Remix", was released on November 10, 2009. Pitbull contributed verses written by himself, and the remix was produced by Marc Kinchen, who gave the song a total twist, turning it into an "urban" version. The second, a banda version, with vocals American Regional Mexican singer Jenni Rivera. She explained that "although we are from different musical genres we have a lot in common. Our character, our Mexican influences and our pride as a woman." The banda version was released on contemporary hot radio in the United States and Puerto Rico on December 11, 2009, and digital download on December 23, 2009. The third, a remix subtitled "Eurodance Version", remixed by Spanish DJ and producer Juan Magán. It version impacted the electronic dance music radio.

== Track listing ==
Digital download

1. "Ni Rosas Ni Juguetes" – 3:13

Mr. 305 remix

1. "Ni Rosas Ni Juguetes" (Mr. 305 Remix) Feat. Pitbull – 3:37

Mr. 305 remix - extended version

1. "Ni Rosas Ni Juguetes" (Mr. 305 Remix - Extended Version) Feat. Pitbull – 4:41

Banda version

1. "Ni Rosas Ni Juguetes" (Banda Version) Feat. Jenni Rivera – 3:15

Juan Magán remix

1. "Ni Rosas Ni Juguetes" (Juan Magán Remix) – 3:35

== Credits and personnel ==
Credits are adapted from the liner notes of "Gran City Pop".

- Paulina Rubio – backing vocals, lead vocals
- Claudia Brant – songwriting
- Noel Schajris – songwriting
- Gian Marco – songwriting
- Cachorro López – production, bass, synthesizer, programming
- Sebastian Schon – guitar, bass, keyboards, programming, recording
- Martin Garcia Reinoso – guitar
- Demián Nava – keyboards, programming, recording
- Juan Blas Caballero – keyboards, programming, recording
- Flor Ciarlo – additional backing vocals
- Cesar Sogbe – mixing
- Chris Gehringer – mastering

== Charts ==
=== Weekly charts ===
Chart (2009–2010)	Peak position
Bolivia Airplay (Top Latino)	2
Guatemala (EFE)	5
Mexico (Billboard Mexican Airplay)	13
Mexico (Billboard Espanol Airplay)	9
Mexico (Monitor Latino)	9
Panama (EFE)	2
Peru (UNIMPRO)	1
Spain (PROMUSICAE)	3
Puerto Rico Airplay (Top Latino)	4
Spain Digital Song Sales (Billboard)	3
US Hot Latin Songs (Billboard)	9
US Latin Pop Airplay (Billboard)	5
US Latin Digital Songs (Billboard)	24
US Tropical Songs (Billboard)	39
US Latin Rhythm Airplay (Billboard)	12
Venezuela (Record Report)	17

=== Year-end charts ===
Chart (2010)	Position
Spain (PROMUSICAE)	15

== Certifications ==
Region	Certification	Certified units/sales
Spain (Promusicae)	Platinum	40,000^{*}
Spain (Promusicae) Mr. 305 Remix	Platinum	40,000^{*}
^{*} Sales figures based on certification alone.

== Release history ==
Country	Date	Format	Version	Label	Ref.
Various	August 17, 2009	Digital download; CD single; Contemporary hit radio	Original	Universal Music Group	
Various	November 10, 2009	Digital download; CD single; Contemporary hit radio	Mr. 305 Remix feat. Pitbull	Universal Music Spain, S.L.	
Various	November 17, 2009	Digital download; CD single; Contemporary hit radio	Banda Version with Jenni Rivera	Universal Music Spain, S.L.	
Various	December 4, 2009	Digital download; CD single; Contemporary hit radio	Juan Magán remix (eurodance version)	Universal Music Spain, S.L.	
