= Causa y Efecto =

Single by Paulina Rubio

from the album Gran City Pop
- Released: March 30, 2009
- Recorded: 2008
- Genre: Pop; glam rock
- Length: 3:23
- Label: Universal Latino
- Songwriters: Mario Domm; Mónica Vélez
- Producer: Cachorro López

Paulina Rubio singles chronology
"Que Me Voy A Quedar" (2007)	"Causa y Efecto" (2009)	"Ni Rosas Ni Juguetes" (2009)

Music video
- "Causa Y Efecto" on YouTube

"Causa y Efecto" (English: Cause and Effect) is a song by Mexican singer Paulina Rubio from her ninth studio album, Gran City Pop (2009). It was released as the lead single of the album on March 30, 2009, by Universal Latino. The song was produced by Cachorro López, and written by Mario Domm and Mónica Vélez.

"Causa y Efecto" became a hit reaching number 1 in the US Billboard Hot Latin Songs and Latin Pop Airplay. It was Rubio's first number one single on the Hot Latin Songs since Ni Una Sola Palabra in 2006. The song was awarded "Song of the year pop/ballad" by ASCAP.

== Background and composition ==
Paulina Rubio began working on her ninth studio album in January 2008. Frontman of Latin pop group Camila and music producer Mario Domm, announced on late 2008 he wrote a couple of songs for the singer's new album named "Cielo de Papel" and "Causa y Efecto". At Rubio's request, Domm managed to write an "aggressive" song with Mónica Vélez. and he defined it as: "how the woman tells the man that if she no longer loves him it is simply because he asked for it". "He composed the song with me talking and asking: 'What do you mean?', 'What are you up to?'", said Rubio about the songwriting process for "Causa Y Efecto." "I talked to him about all the cause and effect of what we do and that many times things turn around, like in a relationship that there [in the song] suggests that things can change," she mentioned. Rubio also revealed the song contains phrases that she considers part of her life philosophy.,

Finally, Rubio chose "Causa y Efecto" as one of the ten songs to be included on her ninth studio album, and as its lead single. Domm wrote other song for Gran City Pop, "Escaleras de Arena", a song that talks about "a relationship that ends" and the "disappointment of love". The song was produced by Latin Grammy Award-winning Argentine Cachorro López, who along with Rubio was the executive producer of the album.

== Release ==
"Causa y Efecto" on contemporary hit radio in the United States on March 30, 2009, and it was released worldwide one day later. Rubio performed the song at the Wal-Mart Shareholders' Meeting, singing a "spanglish" version of the song. She performed parts of the Spanish version and others of an unreleased English version. An English version of the song was released on a remix of the song, the George Figares Radio Mix.

== Critical reception ==
"Causa Y Efecto" was acclaimed by music critics and audience alike. Spanish website Jenesaispop calling it a "guilty pleasure", and compared with Fangoria works.

== Chart performance ==
In the United States, "Causa Y Efecto" entered at number forty on the Billboard Hot Latin Songs. Ten weeks later, on June 27, 2009, it peaked at number one, leaps 10–1, and with 14 millions of audience. It was the major biggest jump by a female artist on the chart since Jennifer Lopez's "Qué Hiciste" in 2007, that leaps 12–1. It was Rubio's fourth number-one single on the chart of her career. The song spent five weeks atop, and twenty-four weeks inside on the chart. Also, "Causa y Efecto" become longest consecutive running number-one single of the 2009 on the Hot Latin Songs. On the Latin Pop Airplay, it debuted at twenty-two and peaked at number-one in the same week, staying atop for eight consecutive weeks, and thirty weeks inside on the chart; while on the Hot 100 Airplay reached the number seventy-three, and reached number four on the Bubbling Under Hot 100.

In Spain, the single debuted at #43, and has peaked at #7 based on downloads alone. On May 9, 2009, Causa y Efecto entered at the Spanish Airplay Chart at #7 as the highest debut of that week, and peaked at #1 for three consecutive weeks.

== Music video ==
In the music video a Newton's pendulum is observed

The music video for "Causa y Efecto" was directed by the Austrian director Rudi Dolezal and the cinematographic photography by Karsten "Crash" Gopinath. The video was filmed 5–6 April 2009 in Miami, Florida at M3 Studios. The video premiered worldwide on May 7, on the channel MTV Tres.

The official video begins with Rubio leaning on the back of her boyfriend (played by model Buddy Krueger), whom she suspects is unfaithful to her. Rubio and her love interest's pose in the clip is similar to the shot by fashion photographer Mert Alas and Marcus Piggott, who were photographed British supermodel Kate Moss and British actor Jamie Dornan for the 2006 Calvin Klein Jeans campaign. In the same sequence, a Newton's pendulum is observed, which refers to the lyrics of the song. She is then seen her bedazzled face, made up to look like a human mirrorball. Then, she appears on a stage wearing a blue one-sleeved blue sequined mini dress by Balmain, with her musicians vocalizing the song. Throughout the video, there are interspersed of different scenes, including a skating hall and darts. There are also scenes of Rubio playing her electric guitar wearing a purple mini dress— the same dress of Gran City Pop cover artwork —while stocking in front of a curtain with her image. This is followed by a rock performance scene with her musicians in Miami City, where Rubio wears her characteristic sunglasses, her short-brimmed hat and her blonde hair blowing in the wind. The video ends with Rubio pointing to the horizon.

According to Rubio, "Causa Y Efecto" is a '80s-inspired video, "It's all about the performance, and the rock-and-roll [aspect], glam rock and the rhythm." In an interview with Terra, she said wanted to convey a "synergy with the band (her musicians), a little retro The Beatles vibe, and the interaction they had when the[British band] played." Similarity of the scenes and some elements used for the "Causa Y Efecto" music video is similar to "Heart Of Glass" by Blondie.

=== Alternative video ===
A "take two" of the music video was premiered on Universal Music Spain's official YouTube channel. The clip shares similar sequences and scenes to the official video, but instead of appearing with her male musicians at the bar and under the bridge in Miami, Rubio appears with a group of female musicians in a colorful white room that includes huge colorful transparent plates, and hippie symbolism. At the end of the video, she appears having fun with a group of children.

== Remix ==
An official remix of the song was released on June 12. It features reggaeton duo Angel & Khriz.

== Live performance ==
Rubio's first live performance of "Causa Y Efecto" was at the Latin Billboard Music Awards in Miami, Florida on April 23, 2009. For the performance she wore a minidress purple. The stage featured their musicians and choreography alongside students from a local high school, Rubio was one of the most expected artists of the night. She also performed the song in a private concert at the Gotham Hall in New York City on May 11 promoting Gran City Pop. The concert was presented by Univision Radio. On July 16, 2009, Rubio presented the song at the sixth edition of Premios Juventud. She was the first to appear on the show, performing it live. The set design simulated a giant chess set where the dancers were dressed in black and white. Rubio pretended to be a "queen" wearing a sequined mini-dress with a zig-zag stripe pattern, fuchsia fingerless gloves and a silver crown.

== Track listing ==
- CD Single
1. "Causa y Efecto" [Album version] - 3:27

== Charts ==
=== Weekly charts ===
Chart (2009)	Peak position
Bolivia Airplay (Top Latino)	2
Chile Airplay (Top Latino)	5
Colombia (EFE)	10
Costa Rica (EFE)	5
Costa Rica Airplay (Top Latino)	2
Ecuador Airplay (Top Latino)	2
Guatemala (EFE)	1
Honduras Airplay (Top Latino)	1
Mexico (Billboard Mexican Airplay)	1
Mexico (Billboard Espanol Airplay)	1
Mexico (Monitor Latino)	1
Panama (EFE)	1
Paraguay Airplay (Top Latino)	1
Puerto Rico Airplay (Top Latino)	1
Spain (PROMUSICAE)	1
Spain Airplay (PROMUSICAE)	7
Spain Digital Song Sales (Billboard)	5
US Bubbling Under Hot 100 (Billboard)	4
US Hot Latin Songs (Billboard)	1
US Latin Pop Airplay (Billboard)	1
US Radio Songs (Billboard)	73
US Heatseeker Songs (Billboard)	23
US Tropical Songs (Billboard)	6
US Latin Rhythm Airplay (Billboard)	6
Venezuela (Record Report)	11

=== Year-end charts ===
Chart (2009)	Position
Mexico Singles Chart (Monitor Latino)	5
Spanish Singles Chart (PROMUSICAE)	33
Spain Top 20 Radio (PROMUSICAE)	20
US Hot Latin Songs (Billboard)	11
US Latin Pop Airplay Songs (Billboard)	5

== Certifications and sales ==
Region	Certification	Certified units/sales
Spain (Promusicae)	Platinum	40,000^{*}
United States	—	9,000
^{*} Sales figures based on certification alone.

== Release history ==
Country	Date	Format	Version	Label	Ref.
United States	March 30, 2009	Contemporary hit radio	Original	Universal Music Group	
Various	March 31, 2009	Digital download; CD single; Contemporary hit radio	Original	Universal Music Spain, S.L.	
Various	July 21, 2009	Digital download; CD single; Contemporary hit radio	Urban Remix with Angel & Khriz	Universal Music Spain, S.L.	

== See also ==
- List of number-one songs of 2009 (Mexico)
- List of number-one Billboard Hot Latin Songs of 2009
- List of top 20 songs of 2009 in Mexico
