= Star of the Desert Arena =

Indoor arena in Primm, Nevada

- Interactive map of Star of the Desert Arena
- Address: 31900 South Las Vegas Boulevard
- Location: Primm, Nevada, U.S.
- Coordinates: 35.6141540°N 115.3834079°W
- Capacity: 6,500

Construction
- Opened: May 14, 1994; 32 years ago
- Closed: July 7, 2025; 13 months ago

Website
- www.primmvalleyresorts.com/Entertainment.aspx

Star of the Desert Arena is a defunct 6,500-seat indoor arena located in Primm, Nevada, United States. It was used primarily for concerts and was part of the Buffalo Bill's hotel and casino, one of the Primm Valley Resorts.

Although Primm is near the California-Nevada state line, it is considered part of the Las Vegas market because it is located in Clark County and for that reason Star of the Desert Arena was a popular Las Vegas stop for many mid-sized concert tours. Additionally, many Mexican recording artists had performed at the arena whenever they have been in Las Vegas.

Additionally, Star of the Desert Arena was used for boxing, wrestling, trade shows, conventions and other sporting events. The 39-foot (12 m) tall arena contained 31,260 square feet (2,904 m^{2}) of space.

The arena closed in 2025 along with Buffalo Bill's.
