= Claudia Brant =

Argentine composer, producer and singer

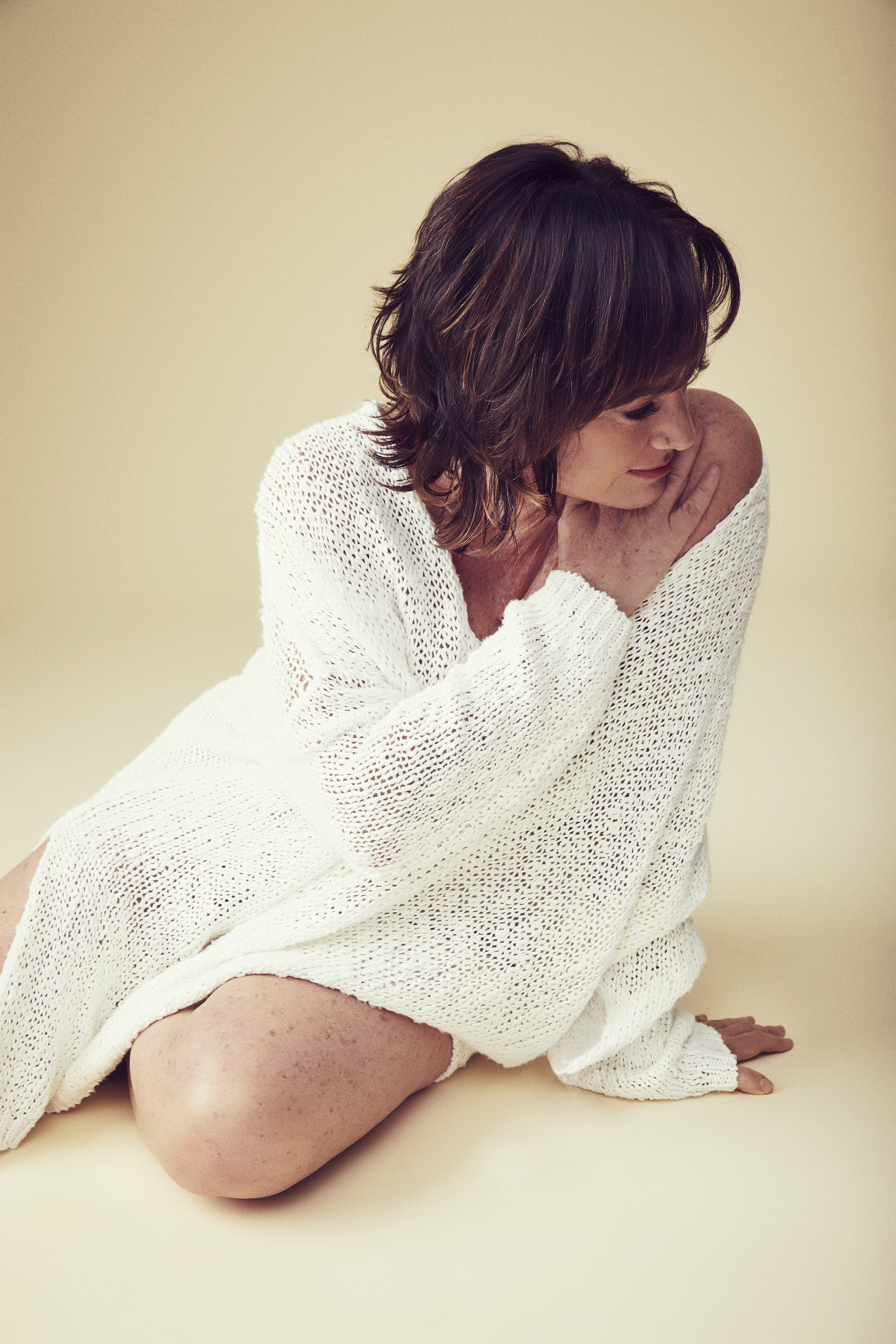

Background information
- Born: Claudia Alejandra Menkarski; July 21, 1966 (age 60); Buenos Aires, Argentina
- Occupations: Composer, producer and singer
- Years active: 1987–present
- Website: www.claudiabrant.com

Claudia Alejandra Menkarski (born July 21, 1966), known as Claudia Brant, is an Argentine composer, producer and singer in diverse genres and multiple languages (Spanish, Portuguese and English).

Approximately 1,200 of her songs have been recorded by different artists in diverse genres and multiple languages (Spanish, Portuguese, English, Korean and French). She was appointed senior vice president of the Latin Songwriters Hall of Fame and named Trustee of the NARAS (National Academy of Recording Arts and Sciences).

== Biography ==
Claudia Brant was born on July 21, 1966, in Buenos Aires, Argentina. Influenced by her parents, she grew up listening to a diverse range of music, and learned to play the guitar and other instruments. Diego Torres and Cristian Castro recorded her songs, which led her to Los Angeles, California. Later, she returned to Buenos Aires, where she studied architecture.

Claudia started professionally composing at age 19 or 20. She signed with Warner Music at the age of 22 and released her first two albums with them. The first of them, "Claudia Brant" released it in 1991. It was in 1991 when she won the Festival OTI in Mexico with the song "¿Dónde estás ahora?" ('Where are you now? )". In 1995, Brant won the Villa del Mar festival. In 1996 she released "Tu marca en el alma", also with Warner Music. Brant moved in Los Angeles in 1998. Between 2006 and 2007 she began working with regional Mexican music exponents. In 2008, Claudia and Luis Fonsi (with whom she has worked since 2005) composed the song; "No me doy por vencido", which he also recorded. The song reached # 1 in the United States' Latin charts, Puerto Rico, Mexico, Spain, Chile, Bolivia, Colombia, Venezuela, Ecuador and most of Central and South America. "No me doy por vencido" was named Billboard Magazine's "Song of the Decade" after holding the #1 spot on the Latin Charts for 19 consecutive weeks, a new record at the time.

She has also released five solo albums that include songs written for other artists. She composed songs like "Más" (More) by Ricky Martin; "Gritar" (Scream) and "Respira" (Breathe) by Fonsi; "Camina conmigo" (Walk with me) by Ha*Ash; or "Hasta el final" (Until the end) by Il Volo.

In 2011, she released the album Manuscrito (Manuscript), an album containing her own versions of musical hits she composed, but previously sung by other artists: "No me doy por vencido", of Fonsi, "Ni Rosas Ni Juguetes", of Paulina Rubio, etc.

Claudia recently opened her new company in LA, Brantones On Demand, to specialize in music for film and TV. Her songs have been featured in numerous films, including Ladron que roba a ladrón and Spare Parts.

In September 2018, she released her sixth album SINCERA through Sony Music Latin, for which she won the Grammy for "Best Latin Pop Album" in January 2019 and her song "Mil e Uma" was nominated for "Best Portuguese Language Song" at the Latin Grammys in November 2019. The album was recorded at East West studios in LA and was produced by Ezequiel "Cheche" Alara and Antonio "Moogie" Canazio. It includes 4 duets featuring Antonio Carmona, Alex Cuba, La Marisoul Hernandez and Arnaldo Antunes.

In March 2020, she started the "Canción de Autor Oficial" initiative, a non-profit organization that seeks to promote songwriters’ craft, defend their rights, and support the education and development of musical talent. In light of the COVID-19 pandemic, “Canción de Autor Oficial“ teamed up with MusiCares for a live event concert series online to raise money for the COVID-19 relief fund, destined for those musicians who have been affected.

In July 2020 she signed a global publishing deal with Sony/ATV and was re-elected as a National Trustee board member for The Recording Academy (LA Chapter, NARAS).

She is currently in the studio working on new material with Piso 21, Ximena Sariñana, Llane, Joey Montana, Sharlene, Luz Casal and Elsa y El Mar.

== Awards and recognitions ==
Claudia won the OTI Festival 1991 with the song "¿Adónde estás ahora?", and the Festival of Viña del Mar in 1994 or 1995 with the song "Como ayer", as author and interpreter. She was the first representative from Argentina to win that festival. She sung both songs. Brant was awarded Songwriter of the Year of Latina SESAC three consecutive times in the United States, between 2007 and 2009. Throughout her career, Claudia Brant has received 7 Latin Grammy nominations as a songwriter, artist, and producer. Brant was nominated for Producer of the Year at the Latin Grammy Awards of 2004. In 2010, Brant was awarded three international awards: the Latin Grammy for "Song of the Year" in 2009 in Las Vegas for her song "Aquí estoy yo" (Here I Am), Premio Oye in 2009 (Academy Mexican Music) by "No me doy por vencido" (I won't give up) (included in the category Song of the Year), and Songwriter of the Year 2009 awarded by the Monitor Latino Convention in Los Angeles, California. The latter was a decision made by a broad panel of representatives from radio and the music industry across the United States.

She was named SESAC “Latina Songwriter of the Year“ and SESAC “Latina Publisher of the year“ in 2007 and 2008. She was named ASCAP Latino “Songwriter of the Year" in 2012 and 2015. Her song “No me doy por vencido“ co-written with Luis Fonsi, was named "Song of the Decade" by Billboard Magazine after the holding the #1 spot at the Billboard Charts in the U.S. for 35 weeks (of which 19 were consecutive).

Claudia received two Latin Grammy nominations for the album Manuscrito in early 2011, for Best Recording's Engineering and Best Female Pop Vocal Album. That same year, she also received her third nomination in the twelfth edition of the Latin Grammys, which she shared with Cuban Desmond Child, for the Song of the Year category with the song "Lo mejor de mi Vida eres tú" (The best of my life is you), performed by Puerto Rican singer Ricky Martin and Spanish singer Natalia Jimenez.

Brant's album SINCERA won the Grammy Award for Best Latin Pop Album at the 2019 Grammy ceremony and her song "Mil e Uma" was nominated for "Best Portuguese Language Song" at the Latin Grammy's Ceremony that same year.

In March 2020, she started the "Canción de Autor Oficial" initiative, a non-profit organization that seeks to promote songwriters’ craft, defend their rights, and support the education and development of musical talent. In light of the COVID-19 pandemic, “Canción de Autor Oficial“ teamed up with MusiCares for a live event concert series online to raise money for the COVID-19 relief fund, destined for those musicians who have been affected.

In 2020 Claudia was re-elected as a National Trustee board member for The Recording Academy (LA Chapter, NARAS).

== Influences ==
- She has named The Carpenters, Charly García, Caetano Veloso, Joaquin Sabina, Joao Gilberto and Joan Manuel Serrat as some of her biggest influences.

== Discography ==
- 1989: Entonces vale la pena - Melopea Discos
- 1992: Claudia Brant - Warner Music Argentina
- 1995: Tu marca en el alma - Melopea Discos
- 2007: Por capricho - Brantones Records
- 2011: Manuscrito - Brantones Records
- 2018: Sincera - Brantones Records

== Singles ==
- 1992: "Juntos / Una más" - Warner Music Argentina
