= Algo de Ti =

"Algo De Ti"

Single by Paulina Rubio

from the album Gran City Pop
- Released: March 22, 2010
- Recorded: 2008
- Genre: Dance-pop; electropop
- Length: 4:04
- Label: Universal Music Latino
- Songwriters: Paulina Rubio; Rafael Vergara; Mauricio Gasca
- Producer: Lester Méndez

Paulina Rubio singles chronology
| "Ni Rosas Ni Juguetes" (2009) | "Algo De Ti" (2010) | "Golpes en el Corazón" (2011) |

Music video
- "Algo De Ti" on YouTube

"Algo De Ti" (transl. "Something About You") is a song recorded by Mexican singer Paulina Rubio for her ninth studio album, Gran City Pop (2009). It was written by Rubio, Rafael Vergara, and Mauricio Gasca, and produced by Lester Méndez. The song was released as the fourth and final single from the album on March 22, 2010.

== Promotion ==
The song was used as the opening track for Rubio's "Gran City Pop Tour".

The song was also performed at the 2010 Pepsi Super Bowl Fan Jam.

The song has two remixes produced by French DJ Junior Caldera; both remixes were released for digital download on April 20, 2010.

Paulina performed the song for the first time at the 2010 Billboard Latin Music Awards on April 29, 2010, as a duet with rapper/singer "Wyclef Jean".

== Critical reception ==
"Algo De Ti" is widely accepted among Rubio's fans calling it a "standout track" from Gran City Pop.

== Music video ==
The music video was filmed in Miami on 26 February 2010, was directed by Steven Oritt of American directing team Terrero Films, and produced by Erin Judd an co-produced by Jessy Terrero (who filmed the two video versions of Rubio's "Ni Rosas Ni Juguetes").

The music video premiered worldwide on April 30, 2010. It premiered on Rubio's official YouTube channel on 1 June 2010.

== Versions & Remixes ==
- Album Version —4:05
- Junior Caldera Remix Club —6:06
- Junior Caldera Remix Edit —3:42
- Juan Magán Remix Urban —3:23
- Juan Magan Remix Dance —3:37

== Chart performance ==
The song debuted at number 50 in Spain on the issue date of week 17. It peaked at number 48 from week 18 to week 19 due to high downloads, as the song was not distributed to radio stations. 'Universal Music Latino' declined to release 'Algo De Ti" to radio outlets, as a result it was unable to chart. It received radio support only from Los Angeles KSSE 107.1 FM Super Estrella station.

== Charts ==
=== Weekly charts ===
| Chart (2010) | Peak position |
|---|---|
| Mexico (Billboard Espanol Airplay) | 32 |
| Spain (PROMUSICAE) | 48 |
| Venezuela (Record Report) | 102 |

=== Year-end charts ===
| Chart (2010) | Position |
|---|---|
| Spain Top 20 TV (PROMUSICAE) | 17 |

== Release history ==
| Region | Date | Format | Label |
|---|---|---|---|
| Worldwide | Video Release Only | Radio premiere | Universal Latino |
| Spain | April 27, 2010 | Digital download (Remixes) | Universal Latino |
