= Nuvo (liqueur) =

Fortified wine made in Paris, France

NUVO L'esprit De Paris
- Type: Liqueur
- Distributor: London Group Co.
- Origin: France
- Introduced: 2004
- Alcohol by volume: 15%
- Proof (US): 30
- Flavor: Tropical Flavor (Pink); Lemon (Yellow)

Pink Nuvo

Nuvo L'esprit De Paris is a fortified wine marketed as a sparkling liqueur. Nuvo is made in Paris, France and imported by the London Group. Nuvo was initially marketed to women; early bottles displayed the words "For Her". Later the company removed the "For Her" print.

== Production ==
The Nuvo bottle looks like a large perfume bottle. Nuvo is made with grain and spring water and then mixed with sparkling wine.

Bottle label : Nuvo

Is a perfect liqueur of French white wine, ultra-premium French Vodka, French Sparkling wine, exotic fruit flavourings and a touch of carbonation.

Product of France

Bottled in Italy by Diageo Operations Italy S.p.A.

== See also ==
- Fortified wine
- Low-end fortified wine
- Malt Liquor
