= Pau Factor =

Greatest hits album by Paulina Rubio
- Released: November 25, 2013
- Recorded: 1999–2012
- Genres: Latin pop; dance-pop
- Length: 50:50
- Label: Universal Music Group
- Producers: RedOne; Alex P; Paulina Rubio; DVLP; Marcello Azevedo; Jodi Marr; Cachorro López; Emilio Estefan; Chris Rodríguez; Estefano; Gen Rubin

Paulina Rubio chronology
Brava! (2011)	Pau Factor (2013)	Deseo (2018)

Professional ratings
Review scores
Source	Rating
Allmusic	3/5 stars

Pau Factor is a greatest hits album by Mexican recording artist Paulina Rubio. It was released on November 25, 2013 to capitalize on the singer’s success as a judge on the American reality television music competition The X Factor. It is her third compilation following the previous compilation albums Top Hits (2000) and I'm So in Love: Grandes Éxitos (2001) released through EMI Music. Pau Factor is Rubio’s first greatest hits featuring material she released through Universal Music Group, consisting of album tracks and singles spanning from 2000’s Paulina through her 2011-2012 effort Bravísima! omitting singles from her first four studio albums.

Following its release, the compilation was well received by most music critics, while other’s criticized the collection from excluding some of her notable single releases or any new material. It peaked at number thirteen in the Billboard Latin Pop Albums chart, while charting inside the top forty in the Top Latin Albums.

== Track listing ==
No.	Title	Writer(s)	Producer(s)	Length
1.	"Boys Will Be Boys"	RedOne; Bilal "The Chef" Hajji; Adam Baptiste; Alexander Papaconstantinou	Paulina Rubio; RedOne; Alexander Papaconstantinou	3:05
2.	"Casanova"	Kevin Colbert; Jeeve Doucornet; Estéfano; Calanit Ledani; Darryl Zero	Marcello Azevedo	3:36
3.	"Fire (Sexy Dance)"	Estéfano	Jodi Marr	3:29
4.	"Say The Word"	RedOne; DVLP; AJ Junior; Hajji; Teddy Sky	AJ Junior; RedOne; Teddy Sky	4:15
5.	"Causa y Efecto"	Mario Domm; Mónica Vélez	Cachorro López	3:25
6.	"Ni Una Sola Palabra"	Xavier San Martin	Cachorro López	3:44
7.	"Te Quise Tanto"	Coti Sorokin; Andahí; Adrian Schinoff	Emilio Estefan	4:05
8.	"Lo Haré Por Ti"	Estéfano	Chris Rodríguez	4:41
9.	"Dame Otro Tequila"	Emilio Estefan; Alberto Gaitán; Ricardo Gaitán; Tony Mardini; Tom McWilliams	Estefan	2:42
10.	"El Último Adiós"	Estéfano; Paulina Rubio	Estéfano	4:45
11.	"Y Yo Sigo Aquí"	Estéfano	Azevedo	4:13
12.	"Yo No Soy Esa Mujer"	Christian De Walden	Azevedo	3:44
13.	"Don't Say Goodbye"	Joshua 'Gen' Rubin; Cheryl Yie	Joshua 'Gen' Rubin	4:54
Total length:				50:50

== Charts ==
Chart (2013)	Peak position
US Top Latin Albums (Billboard)	37
US Latin Pop Albums (Billboard)	13
