= Border Girl =

Studio album by Paulina Rubio
- Released: 18 June 2002
- Recorded: September 2001 – March 2002
- Studio: Various: Battery Studios; ProTopia; Soundtrack Studios; The Hit Factory, New York City; Maximusic Studio; Midnight Blue Studios; South Beach Studios, Miami; The Engine, LA; Stereo Studio 1, Oslo
- Genres: Pop; dance pop; pop rock
- Length: 61:15
- Languages: English, Spanish
- Labels: Universal; Polydor
- Producers: Doug Morris, Bruce Carbone, Sal Guastella, Gen Rubin, David Eriksen, Shep & Kenny, Kenny Flav, Lenio Purry, Marcello Azevedo, Chris Rodríguez, Jodi Marr, Brian Rawling

Paulina Rubio chronology
I'm So in Love: Grandes Éxitos (2001)	Border Girl (2002)	Pau-Latina (2004)

Singles from Border Girl
- 1. "I'll Be Right Here (Sexual Lover)" Released: 29 June 2001; 2. "Don't Say Goodbye" Released: 30 April 2002; 3. "The One You Love" Released: 20 August 2002; 4. "Casanova" Released: 9 October 2002; 5. "Libre" Released: 3 March 2003

Border Girl is the sixth studio album and first English-language album by Mexican recording singer Paulina Rubio. It was released on 18 June 2002 internationally by Universal Records and later launched in Japan on 21 August 2002 by Umvd Labels. For her crossover into the English-language pop market, Rubio worked with writers and producers such as Kenny Flav, Lenio Purry, Doug Morris, Gen Rubin, Richard Marx, Brett James, Troy Verges, Michelle Bell, Jodi Marr and works again with Estefano, Chris Rodríguez and Marcello Acevedo. Its music incorporates genres of pop with influences of dance and pop rock, dived into elements of R&B, disco, ranchera, hip hop, house, and electronica. Its lyrics address the subjects of love, sexuality and self empowerment.

Upon its release, Border Girl received positive reviews from music critics, many of whom praised its production and ability to combine musical genres. The album was a commercial success in America and Spain. In the US, the album peaked at number eleven on the Billboard 200 chart, becoming Rubio's biggest album in the country; it was certified gold by the Recording Industry Association of America (RIAA) for shipments of 500,000 units.

Six singles were released from the album. The lead single, "Don't Say Goodbye" was released in April 2002 and became a commercial success, would become her most successful song in English. Follow-up singles "The One You Love" and "Casanova" also performed well on charts internationally. "I'll Be Right Here (Sexual Lover)" was released before the album was conceived, attracted the expectation of the audience in the Anglo-Saxon market. "Libre" and "Fire (Sexy Dance)" was promoted to airplay radio Spain and US, respectively. As well as English songs on the album, have Spanish-language counterparts that became big hits on Billboard's Hot Latin Songs chart.

== Background and production ==
In 1997, after it released Rubio's fourth studio album Planeta Paulina (1996), EMI Music declined to release Rubio's first English crossover album, which was supposed to be the English version of its production. Some tracks were included on CD and Maxi singles formats from the songs "Solo Por Ti" and "Enamorada", but the promotion was limited. Eventually, Rubio got in a legal battle against EMI Music for not fulfilling what they had already planned and had to pay money through Universal Music to let her leave the record company.

After the success of her previous album Paulina, which was certified four times-platinum in Rubio's native country Mexico for shipment of 600,000 units, and eight times-platinum in the US for shipment of 800,000 units, becoming the best-selling Latin album of 2001, Universal Records decided to launch Rubio's career in the English market. Contributions to the album's production came from a wide range of producers and songwriters, including Cheryl Yie, Gen Rubin, Calanit Ledani, Daryl Zero, Jeeve, Kevin Colbert, Kenny Flav, Lenio Purry, Richard Marx, Marcello Azevedo, Brett James, Troy Verges, Jodi Marr, Rodolfo Castillo, Michelle Bell, Desmond Child, and once again with Estéfano and Christian De Walden. Some of the songs from Paulina were re-recorded in English for the album, including the number one smash-singles "El Último Adiós", "Y Yo Sigo Aquí", "Yo No Soy Esa Mujer", and "Sexi Dance".

== Title and artwork ==
"[With Border Girl] I want to reflect what I am, a girl who has lived in Mexico, Spain, Italy, New York... and who translates all that fusion of styles into music. What I do is global music. It is the result of the cultural contrast of my childhood and adolescence; there is a lot of fusion, ranchera, hip-hop, Mexican guitars that cry or flamenco guitars that laugh."

— Rubio talking about the inspiration behind Border Girl.

The album's name takes the title of the song "Border Girl", written by Richard Marx. Rubio liked it as an album title because she wanted to "reflect who I am". Several media opined it was a pun, and that the singer was referring to her crossover music, since it was her first English-language album. But in every interview, Rubio explained that "Border Girl is Paulina, her story, her life, growing up in different countries of the world, absorbing that culture and putting it on her album", using the parallelism as a musical device between her album and herself.

In reviewing Rubio's impact on U.S. Hispanic culture, Professor Angharad N. Valdivia wrote in her essay Latina/o Communication Studies Today (2008), "The title of the album declares the intention to inhabit that liminal space of the border." She concluded, "Hence she becomes the 'bordergirl' and creates an album that utilizes the polyvocality of her 'bordergirl' identity" as a "hybridity of inspired content and projected self-identidy" about a girl who transgresses the border.

The artwork for Border Girl was shot by Spanish photographer Cesar Urrutia. On the cover, Rubio is seen resting her hand in the back pocket of her short jeans, giving the impression that she is subtly lowering her clothes to show her groin. She wears a crop top nude color and a short jeans. Frank Cogan from The Village Voice stated, "On the album cover she seems to be a dirty blonde" that show her most sexual facet. While Billboard journalist Leila Cobo gave a detailed description of Rubio's image as "part sex kitten, part dance diva", explained that she "comes across as the postcard-perfect party girl."

The cover also served as one of two CD single covers for single of the album, "Don't Say Goodbye" / "Si Tú Te Vas".

== Musical styles and content ==
Border Girl—a compendium of fifteen tracks: eleven in English and another five in Spanish—is "essentially a pop album", with prominent elements of Latino-influenced and dance. Follows predecessor Paulina, "it combines beautiful hooks with vocals and choruses, captivating rhythms and abundant energy." Dan Bova from Stuff wrote that the album is "fiercely danceable", and is characterized by a more cosmopolitan texture where "music to transcend boundaries." A similar opinion conceived musical radio network Los 40. The Village Voice music critic Frank Cogan identified it as "[a collection of] music plays in different ways for different listeners: as unnoticed or detested commercial pop, as pretty radio music on the drive home from work, as yet another Saturday-night beat to dance to, as a transcendent dancefloor moment when the sighs and reverb seem to inhabit all of space, as leisure-time sex and giggle." The album alternating wan ballads with disco-beat dance numbers, and encompasses various elements of other genres as pop rock, ballads, techno, electronic, hip hop, R&B, Hi-NRG and disco. The major lyrical content of Border Girl is about "the power of passion" and "the sparks that erupt from magical relationships best."

The opening track, "Don't Say Goodbye", which starts with a spoken introduction by Rubio, is a dance-pop song "blends buoyant techno beats, sweeping keyboards, jangly guitars and stratospheric vocals." Rolling Stone described it as "a bouncy club anthem." In contrast to the "uplifting" sound, the lyrical content of "Don't Say Goodbye" is about a lost love. The song reminds Rubio "women that we have no problem saying when you really want someone not to leave." The Latin-style-rhythms "Casanova" is a dance-pop driven by salsa-fried instrumentals of Spanish-guitars. The title track and the first ballad of album, "Border Girl", is a "funky and melodic" song "whose underlying hip-hop beats only serve to make the song even more appealing." The love song "The One You Love" is a soft rock ballad with dramatic Latin-strings, and fancy harmonies. MTV described it "an effervescent pop melody colored with flamenco guitar" whose lyrical is "about the fulfillment of satisfying someone else's needs." "Not That Kind of Girl" is the original version of the previously Spanish-version "Yo No Soy Esa Mujer" (from Paulina), the song is a little more arena-pop song that reflects on the tensions following a relationship. It holds the empowered and feminist anthem of the first recording.

"Undeniable" is a folk-tinged ballad song where Rubio "left to her own vocal devices." It considered one of the highlights of the album. Also as other "standout track", "The Last Goodbye", captures the Paulina's Mexican sound. A grandiose production driven by "traditional ranchera instrumentation, hip hop rhythms, and pop smarts." Vibe described it as "a searing kiss-off anthem." "Stereo" is a trip-hop-hued, R&B song that captures the affair between two young lovers. It features a rap by Pretty Willie with Kenny Flav on production. Lyrically, "it's about the rhythms of the streets, the feeling of having friends to share, partying and dancing to the sound of a good DJ." The ninth track, "I'll Be Right Here (Sexual Lover)" —the first song considered for Border Girl— is the English version of Rubio's international smash hit "Y Yo Sigo Aquí". The pop song production grows into "Hi-NRG dance ditties" with the tenth track, "Fire (Sexy Dance)." Over a few bland electronic-disco arrangement of finger-plucked strings, "I Was Made For Lovin' You" highlights as "a high-energy club cover of Kiss's 1979 hit" with a dance-heavy-style sound that differs to "Kiss' pyrotechnic bombast." In a retrospective observation, Mike Wass from Idolator commented that "only queen Paulina could turn this Kiss rock classic into a Hi-NRG dance anthem", and felt that the song "it's weird, wonderful and utterly endearing."

The album close with the Spanish-version songs—"Si Tú Te Vas", "Baila Casanova", "Todo Mi Amor", "Y Yo Sigo Aquí"— and the inedit dance-track "Libre".

== Promotion ==
=== Media appearances ===
Prior to the album's release, Rubio premiered "Don't Say Goodbye" at the Alma Awards on 18 May 2002, where was nominated for Breakthrough Artist/Group of the Year; also played on the Wango Tango radio show in Los Angeles. Rubio's shooting performance on the Wango Tango concert was part of Pollstar cover 's holder of the calendar. In an interview, the senior VP of marketing of Universal Music Group, Kim Garner, said that "[she] is probably Universal's number one pop priority," justifying Universal Music's decision to include Rubio on the cover of Pollstar. Rubio returned to Europe to an interview at the Cadena Dial radio station and talked about the album. Early June, Rubio presented Border Girl at a press conference in Madrid, where the most important media in Spain attended. She wore a long form-fitting dress that had a print based on Sandro Botticelli's painting The Birth of Venus.

To promote the album's release, there were promotional advertisements aired on international television channels. One of the first promotional appearances did Rubio was in The Tonight Show with Jay Leno, where the singer talked about the album and sing "Don't Say Goodbye"; the same evening Border Girl was released, 18 June 2002, after celebrating her birthday her Release Party in Beverly Hills. Rubio covered July issue La Vanguardia, the Spanish magazine cited: "Paulina Rubio heads the new generation of Latin American singers who crowds loves." One month earlier, she starred on the cover of People en Español as the cover star and she was chosen as the "most beautiful" of the list "the 25 Latin beauties" of 2002. Also, she appeared in other publications such as Miami's Ocean Drive and Cosmopolitan, where according to Agustin Gurza from Los Angeles Times, "Rubio assumes the lusty pose of a self-confident temptress, a hint of wildness in her tiger-striped blouse, her wraparound suede skirt with the cave-girl cut, and especially in her exotic, feline eyes." The writer wrote for the publication that "her look says she knows what she wants, a statement punctuated by a tousled mound of hair cascading down her shoulders" very Barbarella or Brigitte Bardot.

Rubio went back to United States during the half time of the MLS All Star match between the US National Team and the MLS All Stars team and performed "The One You Love" on 3 August 2002 at RFK Stadium in Washington, D.C.

=== Singles ===
Preceding the album release, "I'll Be Right Here (Sexua Lover)" was released as a contemporary hit radio single —then still without it being conceived— on 26 June 2001 in United States. The song is the English version of massive success single "Y Yo Sigo Aquí", and was well received by music critics, whom complimented its danceability and Hi-NRG style. The single did not receive any promotion due Universal Music released it while Rubio still promoting Paulina album in Europe, but in 2003 it reached top 50 singles in Czech Republic, and was a hit on dance/electronic radio airplay in Russia and featured on the main cover of various artists compilation album Танцевальный Рай 14 (Dance Paradise 14). An accompanying music video for the single was directed by Simón Brand and features Rubio as a sexual girl, dancing in a party at the beach around several young girls and boys.

"Don't Say Goodbye" was released as the lead single of the album on 30 April 2002. It received generally positive reviews from music critics and was praised for its dance influences. The song was commercially successful internationally and peaked in the top ten of charts in countries like Spain, Netherlands and Canada. In the United States it managed to peak at number forty-one on the Billboard Hot 100 chart, becoming Rubio's best selling single in the region. The Spanish-language version "Si Tú Te Vas" also was a success in the Latin America regions. An accompanying music video for the song was directed by the Brothers Strause, and features Rubio riding a red motorcycle, and performing a dance routine and striking various poses in a colourful neon-lighted futuristic-animation city.

"The One You Love" was released on 20 August 2002. It received positive reviews from music critics, considered a highlights of Border Girl. It managed to entered on the Billboard Hot 100 chart, but was a moderate success. In Estonia was one of the most add airplay songs on SKY Radio. Nevertheless, the Spanish-language version "Todo Mi Amor" achieved bigger commercial impact in Latin America and Spain. An accompanying music video for the single was directed by Wayne Isham and features Rubio roller skates down on the pier of a beach and having fun with her fans.

"Casanova" was released on 9 December 2002. It generated a favourable response from music critics, whom applaud its production. Commercially, the Spanish-lñanguage version single performed fairly well and peaked in Mexico, Spain and Argentina. An accompanying music video for the song was again directed by Simón Brand and features Rubio dancing while her love interest plays an acoustic guitar.

"Fire (Sexy Dance)" and "Libre" was released as the final single from the album in March 2003 to US and Spain airplay radio only, respectively.

== Critical reception ==
Professional ratings
Review scores
Source	Rating
AllMusic	4/5 stars
ABC	3/5 stars
Billboard	positive
Entertainment Weekly	C−
IGN	6.5/10
MTV Asia	5/10
People	favorable
Rolling Stone	favorable
Vibe	3/5 stars
The Village Voice	favorable

Border Girl received generally favourable reviews from music critics. Jose F. Promis from Allmusic gave the album an extremely positive review calling it "one of the most interesting and international pop albums of 2002" and praised the production of the album as "a winning combination of different musical styles, successfully bridging pop, dance, hip-hop, rock, ballads, Latin, and even ranchera into one delicious package." Nick Duerden, in an article for Blender, said that Border Girl "is bright, breezily charming and extremely rhythmic." Joey Guerra from Amazon praised the album "a masterpiece that surpasses any pop album sung in any language." and said that "like its predecessor [Paulina], it combines beautiful hooks with vocals and backing vocals, captivating rhythms and abundant energy that are essential for a great pop album." Frank Kogan from The Village Voice also gave it an acclaimed review and enjoyed the dancepop music and disco-oriented of the album, saying that there is "such music plays in different ways for different listeners", and he excited for Rubio's vocals saying that "[her voiece] is even sexier in English than in Spanish. Or maybe it's not she but her music that's sexier." Ken Micallef from Rolling Stone also showed curiosity about Rubio's voice and noted "with her saucy good looks and rough-and-ready voice, Rubio comes her taste for combining techno, pop and Mexican flavors quickly asserts her unique potential."

Rhapsody positively reviewed the album describing it as "addictive pop music with Latin flourishes, dance beats, and insanely catchy choruses". Leila Cobo from Billboard terming it "a party album, and Rubio comes across as the postcard-perfect party girl". However, noted that "has fashioned her English-language debut more after Cher than Shakira." People Magazine favoured the album's consistency and recognized that some songs "brings to mind Kylie Minogue ’80s-style up-tempo numbers such." and she does "a couple of forays into the pop-R&B territory of Jennifer Lopez." By contrast, Mark Bautz from Entertainment Weekly criticized Border Girl as "short on musical brio and long on lyrical predictability." A similar opinion was given by Joe Ng of MTV Asia, assuring that the album "has terrific pop hooks but like catchy TV commercial jingles, they sell products that are wrapped in fads." He ended saying "Rubio will go the way of Paula Abdul."

== Commercial performance ==
In the United States, the album sold 56,000 copies in its first-week and debuted at number eleven on the Billboard 200 chart, becoming Rubio's highest charting album in the region till date. In this region, the album was certified gold by the Recording Industry Association of America for shipments of 500,000 units. As of December 2006 the album had sold 286,000 copies in United States according to Nielsen SoundScan. In Rubio's native country Mexico, Border Girl was certified platinum for shipments of 150,000 units by the Asociación Mexicana de Productores de Fonogramas y Videogramas. To December 2002, the album sold 154,948 copies in this region.

The album achieved similar success in other regions. In Spain, the album peak at number three on the Top 100 Albums chart, and was certified platinum for sales of 100,000 units by the Productores de Música de España. In Chile, the album was certified gold. The album managed to chart on countries such as Japan, Italy and on the Swedish album charts where Paulina had not charted before. In other regions of North America, it charting in July 2002 at number thirty nine on the Quebecer Albums Chart and number four on the Bay Arena Top 20 Albums.

As of December 2002, Border Girl had sold more than 1 million copies worldwide.

== Impact and legacy ==
Border Girl became the first crossover by a Mexican artist, making Paulina Rubio, "historically [...] the first Mexican artist to transcend in the world singing in English". Following its release, the album reportedly sold half million copies in US, becoming the only Mexican singer with two RIAA-certified Gold record standard type with her crossover album and Paulina (2000). Border Girl also brought Rubio a number of accolades and award nominations. At the 2002 Premios Oye! ceremony, she won the award for Mexican Artist with Greatest International Projection, due the success of the album all around the world and for becoming the first Mexican popstar to achieve highest selling albums early 2000s.

== Track listing ==
Border Girl – International edition
No.	Title	Writer(s)	Producer(s)	Length
1.	"Don't Say Goodbye"	Cheryl Yie, Gen Rubin	Gen Rubin	4:49
2.	"Casanova"	Calanit Ledani, Darryl Zero, Estéfano, Jeeve Ducornet, Kevin Colbert	Marcello Azevedo	3:36
3.	"Border Girl"	Richard Marx, David Eriksen	David Eriksen	3:37
4.	"The One You Love"	Brett James, Troy Verges	Shep & Kenny	3:48
5.	"Not That Kind Of Girl"	Christian De Walden, Jodi Marr	Eriksen	3:26
6.	"Undeniable"	Marr, Rodolfo Castillo	Eriksen	3:30
7.	"The Last Goodbye"	Estéfano, Marr	Chris Rodríguez	3:40
8.	"Stereo" (feat. Pretty Willie)	Michelle Bell	Kenny Flav, Lenio Purry	3:49
9.	"I'll Be Right Here (Sexual Lover)"	Estéfano	Azevedo	3:58
10.	"Fire (Sexy Dance)"	Estéfano, Marr	Jodi Marr	3:29
11.	"I Was Made for Lovin' You"	Desmond Child, Paul Stanley, Vini Poncia	Brian Rawling	3:33
12.	"Si Tú Te Vas"	Yie, Rubin, Luis Gómez-Escolar	Rubin	4:51
13.	"Baila Casanova"	Ledani, Zero, Jeeve, Colbert, Estéfano	Azevedo	3:46
14.	"Todo Mi Amor"	James, Verges, Gómez-Escolar	Shep & Kenny	3:36
15.	"Libre"	Estéfano, Azevedo	Azevedo	3:43
16.	"Y Yo Sigo Aquí"	Estéfano	Azevedo	3:58
Total length:				1:01:15

Border Girl – European edition (except Spain)
No.	Title	Writer(s)	Producer(s)	Length
17.	"Vive El Verano" (Bonus Track)	Richard Daniel Roman, Ignacio Ballesteros	Francisco Pellicer	4:10
Total length:				1:05:25

Border Girl – Japan edition (Enhanced CD)
No.	Title	Length
17.	"Don't Say Goodbye (Spanish Fly Radio Mix)"	3:47
18.	"Don't Say Goodbye (Music Video)" (Interactive Track)	3:40
Total length:		1:08:06

Border Girl – Mexican edition (Enhanced CD)
No.	Title	Length
16.	"Don't Say Goodbye (Music Video)" (Interactive Track)	3:40
17.	"Si Tú Te Vas (Music Video)" (Interactive Track)	3:40
Total length:		1:04:52

== Personnel ==
Credits adapted from AllMusic.

- Katie Agresta – vocal coach
- Marcello Azevedo – arranger, bass, composer, drums, engineer, guitar, guitar (electric), keyboards, producer, programming, background vocals
- Michelle Bell – composer, background vocals
- Andres Bermudez – engineer, horn engineer, overdub engineer, track engineer, vocal engineer
- Edwin Bonilla – percussion
- Sandy Brummels – art direction
- Ed Calle – arranger, guest artist
- Bruce Carbone – executive producer
- Javier Carrion – engineer, guitar
- Rodolfo Castillo – composer
- Desmond Child – composer
- Jessica Chirino – background vocals
- Kevin Colbert – composer
- Tony Concepcion – horn, trumpet
- Gustavo Correa – violin
- Michael "Junno" Cosculluela – background vocals
- Omar Cruz – photography
- Christian De Walden – composer
- DJ Saber – cutting engineer
- Vicky Echeverri – background vocals
- David Eriksen – arranger, composer, drum programming, engineer, producer, keyboards, programming
- Estéfano – composer, Spanish adaptation, background vocals
- Orlando J. Forte – violin
- Nina Freeman – A&R
- Chris Gehringer – mastering
- Jules Gondar – vocal engineer
- Sal Guastella – executive producer
- Hex Hector – mixing, producer, remixing
- Sindre Hotvedt – accordion
- Hitesh Hubner – fender rhodes, programming
- Bill Importico – engineer
- Brett James – composer
- Jeeve – composer
- Jennifer Karr – background vocals
- Calanit Ledani – composer
- Marian Lisland – background vocals
- Jodi Marr – composer
- Audrey Martells – engineer
- Richard Marx – composer
- Lorraine McIntosh – background vocals
- Roderigo Medeiros – guitar electric
- Gary Miller – keyboards, mixing, programming
- Doug Morris – executive producer
- Rey Nerio – horn arrangements, performing ensemble
- Nora – composer
- Alfredo Oliva – violin
- Paulina Rubio – vocals, background vocals, primary artist
- Sal Oristano – guitar
- Oslo Philharmonic Orchestra – strings
- Børge Petersen-Øverleir – guitar
- Vini Poncia – composer
- Pretty Willie – featured vocals on "Stereo"
- Brian Rawling – arranger, drums, producer
- Silvio Richetto – engineer
- Bob Rosa – engineer, mixing, vocal engineer, vocal producer
- Gen Rubin – arranger, composer, drum programming, engineer, guitar acoustic, keyboards, producer
- Shep – bass, engineer, guitar, producer, programming
- Craig Robert Smith – engineer, mixing assistant
- Angela Spellman – A&R
- Joe Spix – design
- Paul Stanley – composer
- Ron Taylor – mixing
- Dana Teboe – horn
- Tommy Torres – vocal producer, background vocals
- Cesar Urrutia – cover photography
- Troy Verges – composer
- Ralf Virguez – studio assistant
- Dan Warner – guitar
- Cheryl Yie – composer
- Ivan Zervigon – percussion

== Charts and certifications ==
=== Charts ===
Chart (2002–2003)	Peak position
Italian Albums (FIMI)	35
Italian Albums (Musica e dischi)	24
Japanese Albums (Oricon)	33
Spanish Albums (Promusicae)	3
Swiss Albums (Schweizer Hitparade)	95
US Billboard 200	11

=== Certifications and sales ===
Region	Certification	Certified units/sales
Chile (IFPI Chile)	Gold	10,000
Japan	—	31,320
Mexico (AMPROFON)	Platinum	154,948
Spain (Promusicae)	Platinum	100,000^{^}
United States (RIAA)	Gold	500,000^{^}
Summaries
Worldwide	—	1,000,000
^{^} Shipments figures based on certification alone.

== Release history ==
Release dates and formats for Border Girl
Region	Date	Format	Edition	Label	Ref.
Europe	17 June 2002	CD	Standard	Universal Records	
Mexico	18 June 2002	CD	Standard	Universal Records	
United States	18 June 2002	CD	Standard	Universal Records	
Spain	18 June 2002	CD	Standard	Universal Records	
Italy	18 June 2002	CD	Standard	Universal Records	
Germany	24 June 2002	CD	Standard	Universal Records	
South Korea	1 July 2002	CD	Standard	Universal Records	
Japan	21 August 2002	CD+VCD	Standard	Universal Records	

== Bibliography ==
- Valdivia, Angharad N. (2008), Latina/o Communication Studies Today, New York, Bern, Berlin, Bruxelles, Frankfurt am Main, Oxford, Wien: (Textbook) Media and Communication, ISBN 978-08-2048-632-1
