= List of awards and nominations received by Paulina Rubio =

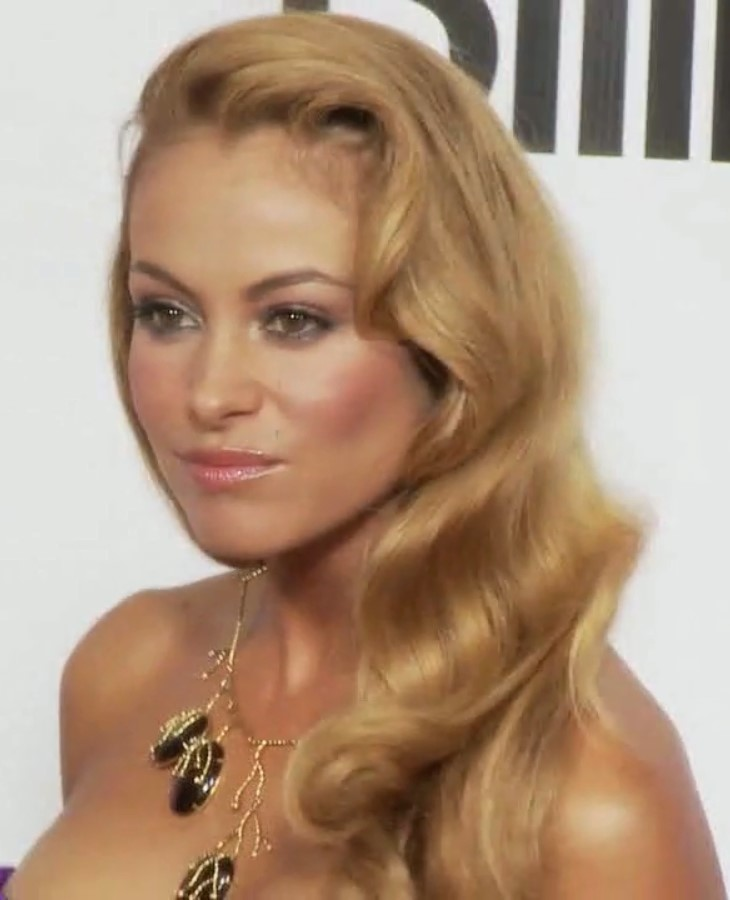
- Rubio during the Billboard Latin Music Awards of 2009
Awards and nominations
Award	Wins	Nominations
American Music Awards	0	1
Billboard Latin Music Awards	6	12
Grammy Awards	0	2
Latin Grammy Awards	0	6
Lo Nuestro Awards	6	29
Premios Amigo	1	3
Premios Juventud	1	12
Premios Oye!	2	5
Premios MTV Latinoamérica	3	13
MTV Video Music Awards	0	4

Totals (Note: Certain award groups do not simply award one winner. They acknowledge several different recipients, have runners-up, and have third place. Since this is a specific recognition and is different from losing an award, runner-up mentions are considered wins in this award tally. For simplification and to avoid errors, each award in this list has been presumed to have had a prior nomination.)
- Wins: 70
- Nominations: 169

Paulina Rubio is a Mexican recording artist, winner of multiple awards at the international level. She began her career in 1982 with the teenage band Timbiriche to later break up a successful solo career in 1992, signing to EMI Music and later with Universal Music in 2000. Referred to as "The Golden Girl" and "Queen of Latin Pop", Rubio is one of the all-time best-selling Latin musicians with sales of over 15 million.

After her musical solo debut in 1992, Rubio was named Breakthrough Female Singer by TVyNovelas Awards in 1993, in addition to receive two nominations for the Lo Nuestro Awards of the same year. Through her career, Rubio has received more nominations and awards from major ceremonies, including a total of six Billboard Latin Music Awards, and nominations to the Grammy Awards and Latin Grammy Awards, as well as the American Music Awards, MTV Video Music Awards and two Premios MTV Latinoamérica. Rubio also won nominations and awards for her live performances, including an Orange Award (Premio Naranja) in the Viña del Mar International Song Festival of 1994, and the Silver Torch from the 2005 edition.

Outside of her works in music, Rubio garnered awards for her acting career, especially for her role in Baila conmigo (1992) which earned her accolades as Best Young Actress. In 2007, she received a medal from the Latino Commission on AIDS for her commitment to AIDS. She was also honored with a Key to the City in Dallas, Texas in 2002.

Rubio's career and success have been recognized at various ceremony awards, including a Sovereign International from Soberano Awards, in addition to be named Mexican Artist with the Most International Exposure during the inaugural Premios Oye! in 2003, and the Best Mexican International Artist on Telehit Awards in 2009. She also received Lifetime Awards from Eres Awards (2001), Telehit Awards (2012), Lo Nuestro Award (2022), and a Lifetime Award nomination on the Orgullosamente Latino Award (2008).

== Awards and nominations ==
Award/organization (Note: Charts are not included, unless they are explicitly described as "awards" or specific trophies are given.)	Year	Nominee/work	Category	Result	Ref.
ACE Award (Argentina)	1990	Paulina Rubio	Best New Act — Television	Won	
ALMA Award	2002	Paulina Rubio	Spanish Language Performance in a Television Special	Nominated	
ALMA Award	2002	Paulina Rubio	Best New Artist/group	Nominated	
American Music Awards	2004	Paulina Rubio	Favorite Latin Music Artist	Nominated	
Asociación Latina de Periodistas de Entretenimiento de Estados Unidos	2006	Paulina Rubio	Less Brightest Star of the Year	Won	
Billboard Latin Music Awards	2001	Paulina	Pop Album of the Year, Female	Nominated	
Billboard Latin Music Awards	2003	"Todo Mi Amor"	Latin Pop Airplay Track of the Year, Female	Nominated	
Billboard Latin Music Awards	2003	"Don't Say Goodbye/Si Tu Te Vas (Remixes)"	Latin Dance Club Play Track of the Year	Nominated	
Billboard Latin Music Awards	2005	Paulina Rubio	Hot Latin Tracks Artist Of The Year	Won	
Billboard Latin Music Awards	2005	Pau-Latina	Pop Album of the Year, Female	Won	
Billboard Latin Music Awards	2005	"Te Quise Tanto"	Latin Pop Airplay Track Of The Year, Female	Won	
Billboard Latin Music Awards	2007	Ananda	Latin Pop Album of the Year, Female	Won	
Billboard Latin Music Awards	2007	"Ni una Sola Palabra"	Latin Pop Airplay Track Of The Year, Female	Won	
Billboard Latin Music Awards	2010	Paulina Rubio	Latin Pop Airplay Artist of the Year, Female:	Won	
Billboard Latin Music Awards	2010	Paulina Rubio	Top Latin Albums Artist of the Year, Female	Nominated	
Billboard Latin Music Awards	2010	Paulina Rubio	Hot Latin Songs - Female Artist of the Year	Nominated	
Billboard Latin Music Awards	2010	"Causa y Efecto"	Latin Pop Airplay Song of the Year:	Nominated	
BMI Latin Awards	2002	"El Último Adiós"	Song List	Won	
BMI Latin Awards	2002	"Y Yo Sigo Aquí"	Song List	Won	
BMI Latin Awards	2003	"Yo No Soy Esa Mujer"	Song List	Won	
BMI Latin Awards	2004	"Todo Mi Amor"	Song List	Won	
BMI Latin Awards	2006	"Dame Otro Tequila"	Song List	Won	
BMI Latin Awards	2013	"Me Gustas Tanto"	Song List	Won	
BMI Latin Awards	2022	"Tú y Yo"	Most-Performed Songs	Won	
BMI London Awards	2003	"Yo No Soy Esa Mujer"	Latin Award	Won	
BMI London Awards	2009	"Nena"	Latin Award	Won	
Cadena Dial Awards	2007	Paulina Rubio	Dial Awards 2006	Won	
E! Entertainment Awards	2000	Paulina Rubio	Celebrity E!	Honoree	
El Heraldo de México Awards	1993	Paulina Rubio	Revelation of the Year, Young	Won	
Eres Awards	1993	"Mío"	Best Video	Nominated	
Eres Awards	1993	Paulina Rubio	Best New Solo Artist	Nominated	
Eres Awards	1994	Paulina Rubio	Best Female Singer	Nominated	
Eres Awards	1994	Paulina Rubio	Best Concert	Nominated	
Eres Awards	2001	Paulina	Album of the Year	Won	
Eres Awards	2001	Paulina Rubio	Lifetime Award	Honoree	
Festival Acapulco	1997	Paulina Rubio	Special Medal	Won	
Furia Musical	2000	Paulina Rubio	Special recognition	Honoree	
Galardón a los Grandes (Mexico) (Note: An award given by Raul Velasco in Siempre en Domingo.)	1993	Paulina Rubio	Revelation of the Year	Won	
Galardón a los Grandes (Mexico)	2010	Paulina Rubio	Pop Female Artist	Nominated	
Galardón a los Grandes (Mexico)	2010	"Causa y Efecto"	Most Watched Video	Nominated	
Galardón a los Grandes (Mexico)	2010	"Causa y Efecto"	Most Popular Song	Nominated	
GQ Awards	2006	Paulina Rubio	Woman of the Year (Note: Awards given by GQ Spain and Mexico, respectively.)	Won	
GQ Awards	2009	Paulina Rubio	Woman of the Year	Won	
Grammy Awards	2005	Pau-Latina	Best Latin Pop Album	Nominated	
Grammy Awards	2010	Gran City Pop	Best Latin Pop Album	Nominated	
International Dance Music Awards	2002	Paulina Rubio	Best New Dance Artist Solo	Nominated	
Juventud Awards	2004	"Paulina"	CD To Die For (Me Muero Sin Ese CD)	Nominated	
Juventud Awards	2004	"Te Quise Tanto"	Party Starter (Canción Rompehielo)	Nominated	
Juventud Awards	2004	Paulina Rubio y José María Torre	Hottest Romance (Tórridos Romances)	Nominated	
Juventud Awards	2004	Paulina Rubio	All Over the Dial (Voz del Momento)	Won	
Juventud Awards	2004	Paulina Rubio	Best Moves (¡Qué Rico se Mueve!)	Nominated	
Juventud Awards	2004	Paulina Rubio	She's Totally Red Carpet (Quiero Vestir Como Ella)	Nominated	
Juventud Awards	2004	Paulina Rubio	Girl that takes the sleep away (Chica Que Me Quita El Sueño)	Nominated	
Juventud Awards	2004	Paulina Rubio	My Idol Is (Mi Idolo Es)	Nominated	
Juventud Awards	2004	Paulina Rubio	Paparazzi's Favorite Target (En la Mira de los Paparazzi)	Nominated	
Juventud Awards	2007	Paulina Rubio	Paparazi's Favorite Target (En la mira del paparazi)	Nominated	
Juventud Awards	2012	"Me Voy" (Paulina Rubio & Espinoza Paz)	The Perfect Combination (Combinación Perfecta)	Nominated	
Juventud Awards	2019	Paulina Rubio	Shoe-Aholic (Apasionado por los Zapatos)	Nominated	
Latin Grammy Awards	2001	Paulina	Album of the Year	Nominated	
Latin Grammy Awards	2001	Paulina	Best Female Pop Vocal Album	Nominated	
Latin Grammy Awards	2002	"Yo No Soy Esa Mujer"	Best Music Video	Nominated	
Latin Grammy Awards	2004	Pau-Latina	Best Female Pop Vocal Album	Nominated	
Latin Grammy Awards	2007	"Nena"	Record of the Year	Nominated	
Latin Grammy Awards	2011	"Golpes en el Corazón"	Record of the Year	Nominated	
Latino Commission on AIDS	2007	Paulina Rubio	Medal	Won	
Lo Nuestro Awards	1993	Paulina Rubio	Female Artist of the Year, Pop	Nominated	
Lo Nuestro Awards	1993	Paulina Rubio	New Pop Artist of the Year	Nominated	
Lo Nuestro Awards	2001	Paulina Rubio	Pop Female Artist	Nominated	
Lo Nuestro Awards	2001	Paulina	Pop Album of the Year	Won	
Lo Nuestro Awards	2002	Paulina Rubio	Pop Female Artist	Won	
Lo Nuestro Awards	2002	"Y Yo Sigo Aquí"	Video of the Year	Nominated	
Lo Nuestro Awards	2002	"Y Yo Sigo Aquí"	Pop Song	Nominated	
Lo Nuestro Awards	2003	"Si Tu Te Vas"	Video of the Year	Nominated	
Lo Nuestro Awards	2005	Paulina Rubio	Pop Female Artist	Won	
Lo Nuestro Awards	2005	Paulina Rubio	Legendary Young Artist Award	Honoree	
Lo Nuestro Awards	2005	Pau-Latina	Pop Album	Nominated	
Lo Nuestro Awards	2005	"Te Quise Tanto"	Song of the Year	Nominated	
Lo Nuestro Awards	2005	"Te Quise Tanto"	Video of the Year	Won	
Lo Nuestro Awards	2006	Paulina Rubio	Pop Female Artist	Nominated	
Lo Nuestro Awards	2008	Paulina Rubio	Pop Female Artist	Nominated	
Lo Nuestro Awards	2010	Gran City Pop	Pop Album of the Year	Nominated	
Lo Nuestro Awards	2010	"Causa y Efecto"	Song of the Year	Nominated	
Lo Nuestro Awards	2010	Paulina Rubio	Pop Female Artist	Nominated	
Lo Nuestro Awards	2011	Paulina Rubio	Pop Female Artist	Nominated	
Lo Nuestro Awards	2012	Paulina Rubio	Pop Female Artist	Nominated	
Lo Nuestro Awards	2013	Paulina Rubio	Pop Female Artist	Nominated	
Lo Nuestro Awards	2013	Brava!	Pop Album of the Year	Nominated	
Lo Nuestro Awards	2013	"Me Gustas Tanto"	Pop Song of the Year	Nominated	
Lo Nuestro Awards	2014	Paulina Rubio	Pop Female Artist	Nominated	
Lo Nuestro Awards	2019	"El Último Adiós"	Replay Song of the Year	Nominated	
Lo Nuestro Awards	2021	"Tú y Yo"	Cumbia Song of the Year - Regional Mexican	Won	
Lo Nuestro Awards	2022	Paulina Rubio	Lifetime Award	Honoree	
Lo Nuestro Awards	2023	Paulina Rubio	Pop Female Artist	Nominated	
Lo Nuestro Awards	2023	"Yo Soy"	Pop Song of the Year	Nominated	
Los 40 Music Awards	2009	Paulina Rubio	Best International Artist In Spanish Language	Nominated	
Los 40 Music Awards	2009	"Causa y Efecto"	Best International Song In Spanish Language	Nominated	
Los 40 Music Awards	2010	"Ni Rosas Ni Juguetes"	Best International Song In Spanish Language	Nominated	
Los 40 Music Awards	2015	"Vuelve"	Best Song — International Spanish-language	Nominated	
Los 40 Music Awards	2015	Paulina Rubio	Best Latin Artist or Group	Nominated	
Lunas del Auditorio	2012	Paulina Rubio	Best Spanish Pop	Nominated	
Miami Life Awards	2007	Paulina Rubio	International Female Singer	Nominated	
Mi TRL Awards	2007	Paulina Rubio	Chica of the Year (Female of the Year)	Won	
Monitor Latino Awards	2010	Paulina Rubio	Pop Artist of the Year	Nominated	
Monitor Latino Awards	2010	Paulina Rubio	Pop Female Artist of the Year	Nominated	
Monitor Latino Awards	2010	"Causa y Efecto"	Pop Song of the Year	Nominated	
Monitor Latino Awards	2010	"Causa y Efecto"	Pop Video of the Year	Nominated	
Monitor Latino Awards	2010	"Causa y Efecto"	Pop Song of the Year, Female	Nominated	
Monitor Latino Awards	2010	"Ni Rosas Ni Juguetes"	Pop Song of the Year, Female	Nominated	
Monitor Latino Awards	2010	Gran City Pop	Pop Album of the Year	Nominated	
Mr. Gay Pride España	2023	Paulina Rubio	Special award	Won	
MTV Video Music Awards	2001	Paulina Rubio	International Viewer's Choice — Latin America (North)	Nominated	
MTV Video Music Awards	2001	Paulina Rubio	International Viewer's Choice — Latin America (Pacific)	Nominated	
MTV Video Music Awards	2001	Paulina Rubio	International Viewer's Choice — Latin America (Atlantic)	Nominated	
MTV Video Music Awards	2002	Paulina Rubio	International Viewer's Choice — Latin America (North)	Nominated	
MTV Video Music Awards Latin America	2002	Paulina Rubio	Best Artist — North	Nominated	
MTV Video Music Awards Latin America	2002	Paulina Rubio	Best Pop Artist	Nominated	
MTV Video Music Awards Latin America	2002	Paulina Rubio	Best Female Artist	Nominated	
MTV Video Music Awards Latin America	2002	"Si Tu Te Vas"	Video of the Year	Nominated	
MTV Video Music Awards Latin America	2003	Paulina Rubio	Best Pop Artist	Nominated	
MTV Video Music Awards Latin America	2004	Paulina Rubio	Best Pop Artist	Nominated	
MTV Video Music Awards Latin America	2007	Paulina Rubio	Fashionista Award	Won	
MTV Video Music Awards Latin America	2009	Paulina Rubio	Artist of the Year	Nominated	
MTV Video Music Awards Latin America	2009	Paulina Rubio	Best Solo Artist	Won	
MTV Video Music Awards Latin America	2009	Paulina Rubio	Best Pop Artist	Nominated	
MTV Video Music Awards Latin America	2009	Paulina Rubio	Best Artist — North	Nominated	
MTV Video Music Awards Latin America	2009	"Causa y Efecto"	Video of the Year	Nominated	
New York Latin ACE Awards	1988	Paulina Rubio in Pasión y poder	Best Young Lead Actress	Won	
New York Latin ACE Awards	2002	Paulina Rubio	Favorite Female Artist	Won	
Nickelodeon Mexico Kids' Choice Awards (Note: Originally known as "Mis Premios Nick Mexico")	2003	Paulina Rubio	Best Group/Solo Mexican Artist	Nominated	
Nickelodeon Mexico Kids' Choice Awards	2012	Paulina Rubio	Favorite Solo Latin Artist	Nominated	
Ondas Awards	2001	Paulina Rubio	Best New Latin Artist of the Year	Won	
Orgullosamente Latino Award	2008	Paulina Rubio	Lifetime Award	Nominated	
People en Español	2005	Paulina Rubio	Star of the Year	Won	
People en Español	2010	Paulina Rubio	Worst Hair Style	Nominated	
People en Español	2010	Paulina Rubio	Most Beautiful Pregnant Star	Nominated	
People en Español	2012	Paulina Rubio	Queen of Twitter	Nominated	
People en Español	2012	Paulina Rubio	Queen of Facebook	Nominated	
Premios Amigo	2001	Paulina	Best Album	Nominated	
Premios Amigo	2001	Paulina Rubio	Best Latin Female Singer	Won	
Premios Amigo	2002	Paulina Rubio	Best Latin Female Singer	Nominated	
Premios Arpa (Puerto Rico) (Note: Also known as simply "Premios Tú Música")	2004	Paulina Rubio	Best International Artist — Audience Award	Won	
Premios Arpa (Puerto Rico)	2004	Best Recording — Female Artist	Pau-Latina	Nominated	
Premios Micrófono de Oro	2007	Paulina Rubio	Female Singer of the Year	Won	
Premios Platino (Uruguay)	2016	Paulina Rubio	Trayectory Award	Honoree	
Premios Oye!	2002	Paulina Rubio	Mexican Artist with the Most International Exposure	Won	
Premios Oye!	2004	Paulina Rubio	Spanish-language Female Pop Solo Artist	Nominated	
Premios Oye!	2004	Pau-Latina	Album of the Year	Nominated	
Premios Oye!	2009	Paulina Rubio	Favorite Artist of the Public	Won	
Premios Oye!	2009	"Causa y Efecto"	Video of the Year	Nominated	
Premios Mixup	2001	Paulina Rubio	Spanish-language Female Artist	Won	
Premios TVyNovelas	1993	Paulina Rubio in Baila conmigo	Best New Actress	Nominated	
Premios TVyNovelas	1993	Paulina Rubio	Breakthrough Female Singer	Won	
Premios TVyNovelas	2002	Paulina Rubio	Singer of the Year	Won	
Quiero Awards (Argentina)	2012	"Me Gustas Tanto"	Best Music Video — Female	Nominated	
Quiero Awards (Argentina)	2015	"Mi Nuevo Vicio"	Best Music Video — Female	Nominated	
Ritmo Latino Awards (Note: Also known as "Premio de la Gente" or Latin Music Fan Awards.)	2001	Paulina Rubio	Best Female Artist	Won	
Ritmo Latino Awards	2001	Paulina	Album of the Year	Won	
Ritmo Latino Awards	2001	"Y Yo Sigo Aquí"	Best Music Video	Won	
Ritmo Latino Awards	2004	Paulina Rubio	Artist of the Year	Won	
Ritmo Latino Awards	2004	Paulina Rubio	Female Pop Artist or Group of the Year	Won	
Ritmo Latino Awards	2004	"Te Quise Tanto"	Song of the Year - Male or Female	Won	
RTVE Disco del Año Gala (Spain)	2009	Gran City Pop	Album of the Year	Nominated	
Shangay Awards	2003	Paulina Rubio	Best International Artist	Nominated	
Soberano Awards	2006	Paulina Rubio	Sovereign International	Honoree	
Soberano Awards	2007	Paulina Rubio	Sovereign International	Honoree	
Tarabú de Oro	2007	Paulina Rubio	Special award: 200,000 downloads	Honoree	
Telehit Awards	2009	Paulina Rubio	Pepsi Award: Best Mexican International Artist	Honoree	
Telehit Awards	2012	Paulina Rubio	Lifetime Award	Honoree	
Viña del Mar International Song Festival	1994	Paulina Rubio	Premio Naranja (Orange Award)	Won	
Viña del Mar International Song Festival	2005	Paulina Rubio	Antorcha de Plata (Silver Torch)	Silver	
Your World Awards (Premios Tú Mundo)	2012	"Boys Will Be Boys"	Best Music Video	Nominated	

== Other accolades ==
Name of country, year given, and name of honor
Country	Year	Honor	Status	Ref.
United States	2002	Key to the City in Dallas, Texas	Honored	
United States		Ritmo Latino Handprints: Latin Music Greats	Won	

Listicles
Year/era	Publication(s)	List or Work	Rank	Ref.
2020	Billboard	Greatest of All Time Latin Artists	41	
2025	Billboard	Best 50 Female Latin Pop Artists of All Time	24	
2012	Forbes Mexico	50 Most Powerful Women in Mexico	n/a	
2013	Forbes Mexico	50 Most Powerful Women in Mexico	n/a	
2011	Univision	25 Most Influential Mexican Singers	8	

=== Vevo Certified Awards ===
Year	Category	Nominated work	Result
—N/a	100,000,000 Views	"Ni Una Sola Palabra"	Won
