= Tal Vez, Quizá =

Single by Paulina Rubio

from the album Paulina
- Released: September 24, 2001
- Recorded: 2000
- Genre: Latin pop
- Length: 4:34
- Label: Universal Latino
- Songwriter: Armando Manzanero
- Producer: Marcello Azevedo

Paulina Rubio singles chronology
"Sexi Dance" (2001)	"Tal Vez, Quizá" (2001)	"I'll Be Right Here (Sexual Lover)" (2001)

Audio video
- "Tal Vez, Quizá" on YouTube

"Tal Vez, Quizá" (transl. "Perhaps, Maybe") is a song performed by Mexican singer Paulina Rubio, taken from her fifth studio album Paulina (2000). The song was written by Armando Manzanero, and produced by Marcello Azevedo. Lyrically, the song talks about a woman who asks her lover to stay with her, narrating from her perspective the feelings and emotions of being the second choice in an extramarital affair.

Universal Latino released the song as Paulina's final single on September 24, 2001. It peaked at number 42 on the US Billboard Hot Latin Songs, and also peaked in the top 20 on Latin Pop Songs.

== Format ==
- Mexican CD Single
1. "Tal Vez, Quizá" – 4:33

== Charts ==
Chart (2002)	Peak position
US Hot Latin Songs (Billboard)	42
US Latin Pop Airplay (Billboard)	20
US Tropical Airplay (Billboard)	32
