= C-Rod =

American musician

- Born: Chris Rodriguez; Miami, Florida, U.S.
- Education: University of Miami
- Occupations: Songwriter; musician; record producer; music arranger; mixer; remixer; recording engineer
- Years active: 1999–present
- Spouse: Patricia Nieto (m. 2002)
- Children: 3
- Musical career
- Genres: Dance; Pop; Latin; R&B; Rock; Soul
- Website: crodmusic.com

Chris Rodriguez better known by C-Rod, is an American songwriter, record producer, music arranger, mixer, engineer, and remixer. He wrote and produced Paulina Rubio's Billboard charting singles, Lo Haré Por Ti, El Último Adiós, and Algo Tienes as well as producing singles for Celia Cruz, Thalía, Ana Cristina, Chayanne, Danna Paola, and Erika Jayne, among others.

He wrote Michael Murphy's #1 charting single So Damn Beautiful, as well as others.

As a recording artist C-Rod's single, Beat Don't Stop, charted at #3 and Stay at #8 on Billboard's Dance charts, among others.

Rodriguez has remixed charting singles for Lady Gaga, Ricky Martin, Jennifer Lopez, Pet Shop Boys, and others. His Spanish remix of Enrique Iglesias's Duele el Corazón charted at #1.

== Early life ==
Chris Rodriguez was born in Miami, Florida. He began playing piano as a teenager. At 18 years old, he began recording songs on his four-track recorder in a small room in his father's warehouse. He graduated from the University of Miami with a bachelor's degree in musical theater.

== Career ==
C-Rod rose to prominence in the early 2000s producing Latin singer, Paulina Rubio's, #1 Billboard single, Algo Tienes, and #7 single, Lo Haré Por Ti, and numerous others.

As a recording artist C-Rod's singles, Beat Don't Stop (featuring Jason Walker) charted at #3, Stay (featuring Brendan O'Hara) at #8, and Raise Your Hands (featuring Jason Walker) at #17 on Billboard's Dance charts, among others.

Rodriguez has remixed charting singles for Lady Gaga, Ricky Martin, Jennifer Lopez, Pet Shop Boys, and others. His Spanish remix of Enrique Iglesias's Duele el Corazón charted at #1.

He has produced singles for Celia Cruz, Thalía (La Super Chica), Ana Cristina (¡Vivan los niños! & A Un Paso De Mi Amor), Chayanne (Boom Boom), Danna Paola (Ruleta), Ednita Nazario (Te Quedarás Hundido), and Erika Jayne (Painkillr), among others.

Rodriguez launched his independent record label, developing new artists and doing remixes for artists Lady Gaga, Jennifer Lopez, and Ricky Martin. He is a signed writer and producer with Sony/ATV Publishing. In 2018, One Horizon Group, Inc. acquired C-Rod, Inc., along with its record label, Velveteen Entertainment and media content division. Rodriguez is now the owner of Mues Media Studio in Miami.

Rodriguez wrote the ¡Vivan los niños!, the closing song for TV show, ¡Vivan los niños! recorded by Ana Cristina. His song, Perfect Picture appeared in the film, Easy A, starring Emma Stone.

== Billboard Singles Chart ==
Year	Single	Peak chart positions				
Year	Single	US Dance	US Latin	Tropical	MX	NZ
2000	Lo Haré Por Ti		7	23	—	―
2000	El Último Adiós		13	24	—	—
2001	Boom Boom	—	—	30	—	—
2001	"La Super Chica"	—	—	—	—	—
2004	Algo Tienes		1	4	—	—
2004	So Damn Beautiful	—	—	—	—	1
2012	Raise Your Hands	17	―	―	—	—
2012	"Ruleta"	―	―	―	—	—
2013	Beat Don't Stop	5	―	―	―	―
2014	Painkillr	25	—	―	—	—
2015	My Religion	41	—	―	—	—
2016	Duele el Corazón (remix English Version featuring Tinashe and Javada)	―	1	―	—	—
2016	Flames	40	―	―	—	—
2016	"Te Quedarás Hundido"	―	―	―	—	—
2017	I Betcha	18	—	―	—	—
2018	So Good	9	—	—	—	—
2019	Stay	8	—	―	—	—
2020	Chess Game	49	—	―	—	—
"—" denotes releases that did not chart or were not released.

== Singles ==
Year	Song	Artist	Credit
2000	Lo Haré Por Ti	Paulina Rubio	Producer
2000	Algo Tienes	Paulina Rubio	Writer, producer
2001	Boom Boom	Chayanne	Music arranger, background vocals
2001	La Super Chica	Thalía	Writer, producer, Music arranger
2002	¡Vivan los niños! (closing song for TV show)	Ana Cristina	Writer
2003	A Un Paso De Mi Amor	Ana Cristina	Musician
2003	Raise Your Hands	C-Rod (featuring Jason Walker)	Writer, co-producer, musician, music arranger
2004	El Último Adiós	Paulina Rubio	Writer, producer
2004	So Damn Beautiful	Michael Murphy	Writer
2010	Perfect Picture (Easy A Soundtrack)	Carlos Bertonatti	Writer, producer
2012	Ruleta	Danna Paola	Producer
2013	Beat Don't Stop	C-Rod (featuring Jason Walker)	Writer, musician, producer, music arranger
2014	Painkillr	Erika Jayne	Writer
2015	My Religion	Alessandro Coli	Producer
2016	Flames	Alessandro Coli	Producer
2016	Te Quedarás Hundido	Ednita Nazario	Producer
2016	The Pop Kids (C-Rod remix)	Pet Shop Boys	Remix producer
2016	Duele el Corazón (remix English Version featuring Tinashe and Javada)	Enrique Iglesias	Remix producer
2017	I Betcha	Alessandro Coli	Producer
2017	Crown and the Girls	Aprilann	Remix producer
2018	So Good	Krys Monique	Writer
2019	Stay	C-Rod (featuring Brendan O'Hara)	Writer, vocals, musician, producer, music arranger
2020	Chess Game	Jasmine Crowe	Producer
