= Don't Say Goodbye (Paulina Rubio song) =

2002 single by Paulina Rubio

- Cover of CD single Mexican edition by "Si Tú Te Vas" / "Don't Say Goodbye"

Single by Paulina Rubio

from the album Border Girl
- Released: 29 April 2002
- Studio: The Engine (Los Angeles); South Beach (Miami Beach, Florida)
- Genre: Dance-pop; Eurobeat
- Length: 3:38 (single version)
- Label: Universal
- Songwriters: Gen Rubin; Cheryl Yie
- Producer: Gen Rubin

Paulina Rubio singles chronology
"I'll Be Right Here (Sexual Lover)" (2001)	"Don't Say Goodbye" (2002)	"The One You Love" (2002)

Audio sample
- "Don't Say Goodbye": file; help

Music video
- "Don't Say Goodbye" on YouTube

"Don't Say Goodbye" is a song by Mexican singer Paulina Rubio, taken from her sixth studio album and crossover album, Border Girl (2002). It was written by Joshua "Gen" Rubin and Cheryl Yie and produced by Rubin. "Don't Say Goodbye" is a dance-pop song and talks about rejecting the idea of saying goodbye to a lover. The song was released through Universal Records on 29 April 2002 as the lead single from the album. In Latin America and France, a Spanish version of the song titled "Si Tú Te Vas" (English: "If You Go") was released, written by Luis Gómez-Escolar.

Critical reception towards "Don't Say Goodbye" was mostly positive, who commended the catchy beat and the production. Commercially, the song debuted at number one in Spain and charted inside the top 20 in Australia, Canada, Italy, and Romania. In the United States, the single peaked at number 41 on the Billboard Hot 100, but the remixes were successful on the Maxi-Singles Sales chart. "Si Tú Te Vas" charted within the five on the Billboard Hot Latin Songs and Latin Pop Airplay charts and reached number 55 in France.

The anime-influenced music video for "Don't Say Goodbye" was directed by the Brothers Strause. It had a total budget of $1 million ($1.4 in 2020 dollars), which made it the most expensive music video made up to that point by a Mexican artist; it is one of the most expensive of all time. The video portrays a futuristic city full of tall skyscrapers and a sophisticated train. It features Rubio driving a red motorcycle and numerous backup dancers, surrounded with LED lights in a club.

== Composition ==
"Si Tú Te Vas" (2002)
The Spanish version of the original track.

"Don't Say Goodbye" was written by Cheryl Yie and Joshua 'Gen' Rubin, and produced by Gen Rubin, who also collaborated to the Spanish-language version "Si Tú Te Vas". Both recordings were included for Paulina Rubio's sixth studio album Border Girl (2002). The song was recorded at The Engine Studios in Los Angeles, California and at South Beach Studios in Miami Beach, Florida, and was mixed by Bob Rosa (Soundtrack Studio, New York City).

The dance-pop and Eurobeat song is backed with breathy and sensually raspy but too wispy vocals by Rubio. According to MTV News, "Don't Say Goodbye" blends buoyant techno beats, sweeping keyboards, jangly guitars and stratospheric vocals. The track is about a former boyfriend of Rubio's who "got goin' just when the goin' was gettin' good". Rubio later explained that the lyrics of the song "remind me a lot to women that we have no problem saying when you really want someone not to leave". Terra noted that even though it's a breakup song, it makes you want to dance to it.

== Critical reception ==
"Don't Say Goodbye" received positive reviews from music critics. Chuck Taylor from Billboard called the song "a pure dance beat, sans any hint of Latin instrumental pepperling". In her review, Mike Trias from Radio & Records considered it one of the highlights of the album "with a sexy, get -up- and -dance beat supporting a catchy hook."

Sterling Clover from Stylus Magazine named it in her list Pop Playground Top 20 Favorite Singles of 2002.

== Music video ==
=== Background and development ===
The music video for "Don't Say Goodbye" was directed by American duo The Brothers Strause and filmed on 1 April 2002, at the Universal City, California. It was inspired by the Japanese animated post-apocalyptic cyberpunk action film Akira (1988). It had a total budget of $1 million ($1.4 million in 2020 dollars), which made it the most expensive music video in history at the time by a Mexican artist, and currently one of the most expensive of all time. The concept of the video was to portray Rubio as a glamorous girl and cosmopolita that conquers her love interest while traveling on a motorcycle through the avenues of a city very similar to Neo-Tokyo, the ficticial city of Akira. About the concept she said:

We did part of it like a Japanese cartoon, and for the dancing, we feel the rhythm of the song because the beat is almost like a heartbeat. The story is about this love that you feel with someone and he just takes one step back. I was riding the motorcycle with him, and at the end, well, he makes his choice. I was riding the bike 'til the end of love. And I was driving, of course. I was in charge.

=== Synopsis ===
The music video for "Don't Say Goodbye" and "Si Tú Te Vas" features a futuristic combination of animation, live action, and dancing shots that loosely convey the narrative of the song. The video opens with Rubio riding her red Akira-style motorcycle on the streets of a futuristic city. She stops in the middle of an avenue and begins to vocalize the song, while wearing a red, long-sleeved zip-up crop top and leather pants. Purple-colored clouds cover the sky, while Tokyo-inspired skyline with many skyscrapers lights up the scene behind. She later travels on the above-ground subway to get to the club. At the club, she performs a choreography with her dancers on a multi-colored floor, wearing a black lace tube top with a long-sleeved glove on her arm and white denim shorts. Rubio enjoys the club atmosphere, and stops to talk to her love interest, and she leads him onto the dance floor. The video progresses inside a golden space ship-style room with white flashing lights. Rubio struts wearing a gold lame mini-skirt and orange halter top, while in another scene at the same place, silhouettes of a couple share a passionate dance. There is also a scene which shows Rubio on a red couch, dressed in a revealing translucent bandeau top, wrapping herself in a white fur and lying down. The next shot shows Rubio and her love interest riding on the motorcycle. She's the driver and is "in charge", while he holds onto her, swaying with her when she makes a turn: the final shot shows Rubio moving her hands in front of the pink PAULINA sign.

=== Reception ===
The music video has received comparisons to Kylie Minogue's works, in the sense that they both incorporate futuristic elements and glamour. According to writer Pam Avoledo from her blog I Want My Pop Culture, who observed the similarities, explained "she seems to be modelling herself off of Kylie Minogue rather than Madonna", who supposedly is her biggest influence. Avoledo also observed "as a way to crossover into the US, it's a complicated one [the success] considering the video is more European than American." The music video was nominated in the category International Viewer's Choice: Latin America (North) at the 2002 MTV Video Music Awards; and for Video of the Year at the MTV Video Music Awards Latinoamérica 2002.

== Track listings ==
US CD single

1. "Don't Say Goodbye" (English) [Radio Edit] – 3:38
2. "Si Tú Te Vas" (Spanish) [Radio Edit] – 3:38

US 12-inch single

1. "Don't Say Goodbye" (LP Version) – 4:54
2. "Don't Say Goodbye" (Radio Edit) – 3:38
3. "Don't Say Goodbye" (Instrumental) – 4:52
4. "Don't Say Goodbye" (Acapella) – 4:28

US 12-inch single (Remixes)

1. "Don't Say Goodbye" (Sharp Boys European Xpress Vox Mix) – 7:26
2. "Don't Say Goodbye" (Mike Rizzo Global Club Mix) – 8:10
3. "Don't Say Goodbye" (Flatline Mix) – 8:58
4. "Don't Say Goodbye" (Sharp Boys European Xpress Dub) – 8:03

Australian CD single

1. "Don't Say Goodbye" (Radio Edit) – 3:40
2. "Si Tú Te Vas" (Radio Edit) – 3:40
3. "Don't Say Goodbye" (Spanish Fly Radio Mix) – 3:56
4. "Fire (Sexy Dance)" – 3:30

Italian 12-inch single

1. "Don't Say Goodbye" (Flatline Mix) – 8:58
2. "Don't Say Goodbye" (Spanish Fly Club Mix) – 6:41
3. "Don't Say Goodbye" (Radio Edit) – 3:38

Japanese maxi-CD single

1. "Don't Say Goodbye" (Radio Edit) – 3:38
2. "Si Tú Te Vas" (Radio Edit) – 3:38
3. "Don't Say Goodbye" (Spanish Fly Club Mix) – 6:38
4. "Don't Say Goodbye" (Flatline Remix) – 8:58

UK maxi-CD single

1. "Don't Say Goodbye" (Radio Edit) – 3:38
2. "Don't Say Goodbye" (Spanish Fly Radio Mix) – 3:54
3. "Don't Say Goodbye" (Flatline Mix) – 8:58
4. "Don't Say Goodbye" (Video)

European and UK CD single ("Si Tú Te Vas")

1. "Si Tú Te Vas" (Radio Edit) – 3:38

European CD single ("Si Tú Te Vas")

1. "Si Tú Te Vas" (Radio Edit) – 3:38
2. "Don't Say Goodbye" (Radio Edi) – 3:38

European maxi-CD single

1. "Don't Say Goodbye" (Spanish Fly Club Mix) – 6:41
2. "Don't Say Goodbye" (Album Version) – 4:51
3. "Don't Say Goodbye" (Sharp Boys European Xpress Vox Mix) – 7:27
4. "Don't Say Goodbye" (Spanish Fly Radio Mix) – 3:56
5. "Don't Say Goodbye" (Flatline Remix) – 8:58
6. "Don't Say Goodbye" (Sharp Boys European Xpress Dub) – 8:03
7. "Si Tú Te Vas" – 4:50

Spanish CD single ("Si Tú Te Vas"/"Don't Say Goodbye")

1. "Si Tú Te Vas" (Radio Edit) – 3:38
2. "Don't Say Goodbye" (Radio Edi) – 3:38

Mexican CD single ("Si Tú Te Vas"/"Don't Say Goodbye")

1. "Si Tú Te Vas" – 3:38
2. "Don't Say Goodbye" – 3:38

Mexican maxi-CD single ("Si Tú Te Vas"/"Don't Say Goodbye")

1. "Si Tú Te Vas" – 3:38
2. "Don't Say Goodbye" – 3:38
3. "Si Tú Te Vas" (Spanish Fly Radio Mix) – 3:58
4. "Don't Say Goodbye" (Sharp Boys European Xpress Vox Mix) – 7:27
5. "Don't Say Goodbye" (Flatline Remix) – 8:58
6. "Si Tú Te Vas" (Spanish Fly Club Mix) – 6:43

== Credits and personnel ==
Credits are taken from the CD single liner notes.

- Lead vocals – Paulina Rubio
- Background vocals – Jennifer Karr
- Writing – Cheryl Yie
- Spanish adaptation – Luis Gómez-Escolar)
- Writing, producing, recording, programming, keyboards & acoustic guitar – Gen Rubin
- Mixing – Bob Rosa at Soundtrack Studios, New York, NY
- Electric guitar – Rodrigo Medeiros
- Photography – Cesar Urrutia

== Charts ==
=== Weekly charts ===
Weekly chart performance for "Don't Say Goodbye"
Chart (2002)	Peak position
Australia (ARIA)	19
Austria (Ö3 Austria Top 40)	61
Belgium (Ultratip Bubbling Under Flanders)	14
Canada (Nielsen SoundScan)	7
Germany (GfK)	70
Italy (FIMI)	18
Italy (Musica e dischi)	21
Netherlands (Dutch Top 40 Tipparade)	2
Netherlands (Single Top 100)	67
New Zealand (Recorded Music NZ)	49
Romania (Romanian Top 100)	19
Scotland Singles (OCC)	67
Spain (Promusicae)	1
Switzerland (Schweizer Hitparade)	47
UK Singles (OCC)	68
US Billboard Hot 100	41
US Dance Club Songs (Billboard)	6
US Dance Singles Sales (Billboard)	3
US Pop Airplay (Billboard)	24
US Rhythmic Airplay (Billboard)	35

Weekly chart performance for "Si Tú Te Vas"
Chart (2002)	Peak position
France (SNEP)	55
Mexico Pop (Monitor Latino)	6
US Hot Latin Songs (Billboard)	5
US Latin Pop Airplay (Billboard)	5
US Tropical Airplay (Billboard)	5

=== Year-end charts ===
Year-end chart performance for "Don't Say Goodbye"
Chart (2002)	Position
Canada (Nielsen SoundScan)	73

Year-end chart performance for "Si Tú Te Vas"
Chart (2002)	Position
US Hot Latin Tracks (Billboard)	18
US Latin Pop Airplay (Billboard)	15

== Sales ==
Sales for "Si Tú Te Vas"
Region	Certification	Certified units/sales
France	—	15,077

== Release history ==
Release dates and formats for "Don't Say Goodbye"
Region	Date	Format(s)	Label	Ref.
United States	29 April 2002	Rhythmic contemporary; contemporary hit radio	Universal	
Europe	27 May 2002	CD	Universal	
Japan	21 August 2002	Maxi-single	Universal	
United Kingdom	16 September 2002	CD; cassette	Universal	
United Kingdom	23 September 2002	12-inch vinyl	Universal	

== See also ==
- List of most expensive music videos
- List of number-one singles of 2002 (Spain)
