= Casanova (Paulina Rubio song) =

Single by Paulina Rubio

from the album Border Girl
- Released: October 9, 2002
- Recorded: 2001–2002
- Genre: Latin pop; dance-pop
- Length: 3:36 (English Version); 3:46 (Spanish Version)
- Label: Universal Records
- Songwriters: Calanit Ledani; Darryl Zero; Jeeve; Kevin Colbert
- Producer: Sal Gaustella

Paulina Rubio singles chronology
"The One You Love" (2002)	"Casanova" (2002)	"Libre" (2003)

Audio video
- "Casanova" on YouTube

Audio video
- "Baila Casanova" on YouTube

"Casanova" is a song recorded by Mexican singer Paulina Rubio for her sixth album Border Girl (2002). It was written by Calanit Ledani, Darryl Zero, Jeeve and Kevin Colbert, whilst it was produced by Sal Gaustella and released as the album's third single on December 9, 2002. A Spanish version titled "Baila Casanova" was also released in Latin American and Spain.

== Music video ==
The video was directed by Colombian director Simón Brand, who in the same week, filmed the music video for the song "I'll Be Right Here (Sexual Lover)". The video was shot at the National Palace of the Dominican Republic. ¡Hola!'s staff wrote that in the video Rubio "appears spectacular a la Marilyn Monroe."

The video premiered in the month of October 2002 on Sol Música.

== Usage in media ==
The song appeared in the 2003 American-Australian film Kangaroo Jack, and also appeared on the film's soundtrack released by Hip-O Records. It also appeared for 15 seconds on the trailer for the 2003 American teen comedy The Lizzie McGuire Movie.

== Charts ==
Chart (2002–2003)	Peak position
Spain (Music & Media)	4
US Hot Latin Songs (Billboard)	37
US Latin Pop Airplay (Billboard)	22
US Latin Tropical/Salsa Airplay (Billboard)	17

=== Year-end charts ===
Chart (2002)	Rank
Spain (AFYVE)	16
