= Paulina (album) =

Studio album by Paulina Rubio
- Released: 23 May 2000
- Recorded: March 1999 – January 2000
- Studios: Midnight Studios (Miami); Code Estudios (Madrid)
- Genres: Latin pop; pop rock; ranchera; hip hop; ballad; dance-pop; Europop; house
- Length: 48:47
- Labels: Universal; Polydor; Muxxic
- Producers: Estéfano; Chris Rodríguez; Marcello Azevedo; Francisco Pellicer

Paulina Rubio chronology
Planeta Paulina (1996)	Paulina (2000)	Top Hits (2000)

Singles from Paulina
- 1. "Lo Haré Por Ti" Released: 11 January 2000; 2. "El Último Adiós" Released: 17 July 2000; 3. "Y Yo Sigo Aquí" Released: 1 November 2000; 4. "Yo No Soy Esa Mujer" Released: 12 April 2001; 5. "Vive El Verano" Released: 9 June 2001; 6. "Sexi Dance" Released: 26 June 2001; 7. "Tal Vez, Quizá" Released: 24 September 2001

Paulina is the fifth studio album by Mexican singer Paulina Rubio, released on 23 May 2000, by Universal Music México and Polydor Records. It marked her first release with the label after leaving EMI and her return following a four-year hiatus. Showcasing a stylistic shift from her earlier works, the album blends contemporary dance-pop and electropop with traditional Latin rhythms such as ranchera and bolero, alongside touches of rock and house, shaping a broader Latin pop sound. Rubio collaborated primarily with Estéfano, as well as Chris Rodríguez, Armando Manzanero, Juan Gabriel, Christian De Walden, and Richard Daniel Roman.

Seven singles were released between 2000 and 2001, including the Hot Latin Songs top 20 hits "Lo Haré Por Ti", "El Último Adiós", "Y Yo Sigo Aquí" and "Yo No Soy Esa Mujer". Paulina topped the Billboard Top Latin Albums chart, was certified eight-times (Latin) platinum by the RIAA, and became the best-selling Latin album of 2001 in the US. It also received multiple platinum certifications across Latin America and Spain, with over three million copies sold worldwide, and ranks among the best-selling albums in Mexico as well as one of the best-selling Latin albums of all time, solidifying Rubio's international breakthrough and her best-selling release to date.

Upon its release, Paulina received widespread critical acclaim, with reviewers highlighting Rubio's artistic maturity and stylistic range. Critics praised its blend of infectious Latin pop and ballads, as well as its diversity compared to her previous work. The album was noted for showcasing different facets of Rubio's vocal performance and femininity, while later retrospectives commended its fusion of contemporary pop with traditional Mexican influences. In 2001, Rubio was honored at the Premios Ondas as Best Latin Revelation Artist or Group, and the album earned three Latin Grammy Award nominations, including Album of the Year.

== Background ==
"I was with the Capitol from 1991 to 1997, but there came a time when I didn't want to record what they proposed to me. What happened was that I started recording this album without having a company to edit it, although then Universal bought my contract in America and I was able to release [the album] with them."

— Paulina Rubio.

After establishing herself in the Latin music industry as "La Chica Dorada", in summer 1996, Paulina Rubio released her fourth studio album, Planeta Paulina. The album represented a drastic change in the singer's musical direction, incorporating elements of dance and electronic music. The public was unimpressed with her new musical direction, despite the fact that critics were convinced by her new sound. The backlash resulted in Planeta Paulina having little impact on commercial performance.

The executives of EMI Music record company proposed to release an album in English, which would mean her crossover in the United States and Europe, but as the months passed, they canceled the musical project, which motivated Rubio to seek a new record label. However, EMI Music did not yield to her request, due two years earlier she signed a contract that provided for the release of three albums with EMI Music over the course of four years. After embarking on a promotional tour for the rest of 1997, Rubio had one album pending to record with that label, because "I didn't want to record what they proposed to me."

Early 1998, Rubio continued work on new music, and sought to terminate the contract with EMI Music. At the end of that year, Universal Music Latino became interested in Rubio's creative process and her new music, so the record company bought the old contract from EMI Music and signed a new one with the division in Latin America. Rubio left EMI Music in November 1998, ending their six-year relationship.

== Development and production ==
Soon after, Rubio began work on her fifth studio album. On it she collaborated with producers and writers such as Spanish singer-songwriter Nacho Cano, from the Spanish band Mecano, and Armando Manzanero. The album was recorded mostly at Midnight Studios in Miami, Florida. Only "Vive El Verano" and an unreleased song titled "Es El Verano" was recorded in Barcelo, Spain, in the period when Rubio was a television host in the show Vive El Verano aired by Antena 3. Rubio took nearly two years to prepare her fifth studio album. The singer updated her music and got ready for this new challenge with new producers and songwriters such as Estéfano, Armando Manzanero, Alejandro García Abad, Ralf Stemmann, Christian De Walden, Richard Daniel Román, Ignacio Ballesteros and Juan Gabriel.

== Promotion ==
The first album of Paulina Rubio's career to bear Universal Music Group label, Paulina was released on May 23, 2000. In Mexico it was released one month before, while in Italy was released in 2001. To promote the album, Rubio appeared on several TV shows. In Argentina, she appeared specially at Telemanias where she performed several songs, including "Lo Haré Por Ti", "El Último Adiós", "Sexi Dance", and "Tal Vez, Quizá". Approaching to greet the audience, she expressed her support for women's liberation movement, effusively shouted "up women's liberation!".

Rubio did an extensive promotion campaign for the album, appearing on various television programs and at music festivals. As well, she embarked on her first concert world tour, called Paulina Tour. She performed in Mexico and United States in Summer 2001.

=== Singles ===
"Lo Haré Por Ti" was released in January 2000 as the album's lead single. It marked Rubio's return to industry music, reached at number one in several countries. The video show Rubio reinvented with a style eclectic and sexy. "El Último Adiós" was then released in July 2000 as the second single in Latin America and reached at number one in Mexico, Colombia and Chile. The controversial music video contained racy love scenes, as well as men and women appearing barely clothed.

In November 2000, "Y Yo Sigo Aquí" was released as the third single in America and the second in Europe. The song reached number one in 30 countries and number three in Billboard Hot Latin Songs chart. An English version titled "Sexual Lover" of the song with released in summer 2001. Rubio performed the song on the British music show Top of the Pops. "Yo No Soy Esa Mujer" was released as the fourth single from Paulina in April 2001 reaching number seven in the Hot Latin Songs chart. It became her fourth number-one single in Mexico.

"Vive El Verano", written by Richard Daniel Roman and Ignacio Ballesteros was released as the album's fifth single on June 9, 2001, charting at number 31 in Italy. The song was released only in Europe as a third single from Paulina. This enabled it to European Albums chart at number 56. "Sexi Dance" was initially issued as a club-only track in America, but was a success where it reached number 34 on the Billboard Hot Latin Songs chart. The song also appeared as an English version titled "Fire (Sexy Dance)" of Rubio's subsequent studio album Border Girl.

"Tal Vez, Quizá", written by Armando Manzanero was released as the album's sixth and final single in September 2001. The song earned critical acclaim.

Paulina spawned official seven singles and other two songs were released as promotional singles. "Sin Aire" was launched in Spain in the summer of 2001 and "Mírame a Los Ojos" in Brazil for the promotion of a soap opera, but it was well accepted that it was launched on radio stations.

== Critical reception ==
Professional ratings
Review scores
Source	Rating
Apple Music	3.5/5 stars
Allmusic	4.5/5 stars
El Tiempo	favourable
MSN Music	4.5/5 stars

At the time of its release, Paulina received universal acclaim from critics; most of them acknowledged Rubio's mature perceptions. Steve Huey of AllMusic gave the album 4.5 out of 5 stars, and considered the album "[a] plenty of infectious Latin pop, plus a few show-stopping ballads". He concluded, "Display a variety that's never been quite so fully realized on a Rubio album before. All in all, it's one of her best to date." Joey Guerra from Amazon highlighted the majority tracks while summing the album up as a "most diverse and mature", and acclaimed Rubio as the "Latin pop for the new millennium." El Tiempo noted that the album sees Rubio "plays to present different feminine facets with various resources: the versatility of her voice, sometimes huskier ("El Último Adiós"), sometimes turned into a subtle thread ("Tal Vez, Quizá"), but energetic in general." In an enthusiastic retrospective review, Apple Music complimented Rubio's fushion of contemporary pop/Traditional Mexican folk music crossover, writing, "[Paulina] shows a mix in an explicit way and is a sonic walk through different styles and intensities, with extracts from ranchera, bolero, electronic pop, ballads and guitar rock."

In December 2001, Rubio received recognition from the Premios Ondas for Best Latin Revelation Artist or Group due "her way of applying spectacularity to Latin rhythms" in the music.

=== Accolades ===
Year	Award	Category	Result	Ref.
2001	Latin Grammy Awards	Album of the Year	Nominated	
2001	Latin Grammy Awards	Best Female Pop Vocal Album	Nominated	
2001	Billboard Latin Music Awards	Pop Album of the Year (Female)	Nominated	
2001	Lo Nuestro Awards	Pop Album of the Year	Won	
2001	ERES Awards	Album of the Year	Won	
2001	Ritmo Latino Music Awards	Album of the Year	Won	
2001	Amigo Awards	Best Latin Album	Nominated	

== Commercial performance ==
Worldwide the album sold 1.6 million copies the first year, the figure increased to 2.5 million in 2002. Since then, worldwide sales stands at 3 million. According to a report from EFE, those sales came mainly from United States, Mexico, Spain, Colombia, Central America and Venezuela. After reaching the 2 million mark worldwide, her record company gave her a double Diamond certification. The presentation to grant these recognitions to Rubio was made in December 2001 during the TV show Otro Rollo. alone Paulina was certified 4× Platinum in Mexico according to AMPROFON after reaching sales of 600,000 units. In the United States, Paulina reportedly sold 255,000 copies in 2001. It reached number one on the Billboard Top Latin Albums chart on February 24, 2001, 33 weeks after its debut on the chart and it stayed there for two consecutive weeks. On May 26, a year after its release, the album topped the chart again at number one. During that period, she received her first standard-type gold certification for shipping 500,000 copies in that country. The album reaching No. 156 on the Billboard 200 and No. 6 Heatseekers Albums. With its success, Rubio held the record for the highest 2001 sales by a Latin artist and in total was certified 8× platinum for the shipping of 800,000 copies in the U.S. alone. As of January 2004, Nielsen SoundScan reported a total of 480,000 units in the US.

Paulina also peaked at number one on the Mexican Albums Chart and reached the number two in Spain. With this album, Paulina achieved international recognition and success, as several of the album's singles entered the Top 10 on Billboard's Hot Latin Songs chart in the US. The album was certified Gold and Platinum in Mexico, U.S., Colombia, Central America, Venezuela, Spain, Argentina and Chile.

== Track listing ==
Paulina – Standard edition
No.	Title	Writer(s)	Producer(s)	Length
1.	"Lo Haré Por Ti"	Estéfano	Chris Rodríguez	4:41
2.	"El Último Adiós"	Estéfano; Paulina Rubio	Rodríguez	4:45
3.	"Tal Vez, Quizá"	Armando Manzanero	Marcello Azevedo	4:33
4.	"Y Yo Sigo Aquí"	Estéfano	Azevedo	4:13
5.	"Sin Aire"	Estéfano	Rodríguez	4:04
6.	"Tan Sola"	Estéfano; Marcello Azevedo; Rubio	Azevedo	5:22
7.	"Sexy Dance"	Estéfano	Azevedo	5:02
8.	"Cancún Y Yo"	Juan Gabriel	Azevedo	3:47
9.	"Mírame A Los Ojos"	Alejandro García Abad	Azevedo	3:55
10.	"Yo No Soy Esa Mujer"	Christian De Walden; Ralf Stemmann; Carlos Toro Montoro	Azevedo	3:44
11.	"Vive El Verano"	Ignacio Ballesteros; Richard Daniel Roman	Francisco Pellicer	4:10
12.	"Baby Paulina"			0:18
Total length:				48:53

Paulina – Brazilian edition
No.	Title	Writer(s)	Producer(s)	Length
1.	"Lo Haré Por Ti"	Estéfano	Rodríguez	4:41
2.	"Tal Vez, Quizá"	Manzanero	Azevedo	4:33
3.	"Y Yo Sigo Aquí"	Estéfano	Azevedo	4:13
4.	"Sin Aire"	Estéfano	Rodríguez	4:04
5.	"Tan Sola"	Estéfano; Azevedo; Rubio	Azevedo	5:22
6.	"Sexy Dance"	Estéfano	Azevedo	5:02
7.	"Cancún Y Yo"	Gabriel	Azevedo	3:47
8.	"Mírame A Los Ojos"	García Abad	Azevedo	3:55
9.	"Yo No Soy Esa Mujer"	De Walden; Stemmann; Toro Montoro	Azevedo	3:44
10.	"Vive El Verano"	Ballesteros; Roman	Pellicer	4:10
11.	"El Último Adiós"	Estéfano; Rubio	Rodríguez	4:45
Total length:				48:35

Paulina – Brazilian edition (bonus tracks)
No.	Title	Writer(s)	Producer(s)	Length
12.	"Lo Haré Por Ti" (Brazilian Remix)	Estéfano	Rodríguez	3:51
13.	"Baby Paulina" (Only Words)			0:18
Total length:				52:01

=== Notes ===
- "Sexy Dance" is stylized as "Sexi Dance".

== Personnel ==
Credits adapted from the liner notes of Paulina.

- Paulina Rubio – lead vocals, composer
- Estéfano – producer, director, composer, acoustic guitar, background vocals
- Marcello Azevedo – composer, electric guitar, bass, programming, background vocals
- Chris Rodriguez – producer, keyboards, programming, background vocals
- Armando Manzanero – composer
- Juan Gabriel – composer
- Christian De Walden – composer
- Carlos Toro Montoro – composer
- Richard Daniel Roman – composer
- Ralf Stemmann – composer
- Alejandro Abad – composer
- Francisco Pellicer – producer

- Javier Carrion – electric guitar, bass, engineering
- Silvio Richetto – keyboards, engineering
- Santi Maspons – engineering
- Rene Luis Toledo – acoustic & electric guitars
- Jonathan Kreisberg – electric guitar
- Tony Concepcion – trumpet
- Brian Lamar – bass
- Ivan Zervigon – percussion
- Marc Martin – programming
- Santi Maspons – programming
- Michael Consculluela – background vocals
- Beth Cohen – background vocals
- Jessica Chirinos – background vocals
- Jori Horivitz – background vocals
- Adriana Mezzadri – background vocals
- Odisa Beltran – background vocals
- Joan Carles Capdevilla – background vocals
- Tulio Tonelli – background vocals

== Charts ==
=== Weekly charts ===
Chart (2000–2001)	Peak position
Colombian Albums (El Siglo de Torreón)	8
European Albums (Music & Media)	53
Italian Albums (FIMI)	50
Italian Albums (Musica e dischi)	49
Spanish Albums (Promusicae)	2
US Billboard 200	156
US Top Latin Albums (Billboard)	1
US Latin Pop Albums (Billboard)	1
US Billboard Hot Heatseekers Albums	6

=== Year-end charts ===
Chart (2001)	Position
Spanish Albums (AFYVE)	5
US Latin Albums (Billboard)	1
US Latin Pop Albums (Billboard)	1

Chart (2002)	Peak position
US Latin Albums (Billboard)	37

=== Decade-end charts ===
Chart (2000s)	Position
US Latin Albums (Billboard)	19
US Latin Pop Albums (Billboard)	9

== Certifications and sales ==
Region	Certification	Certified units/sales
Argentina (CAPIF)	3× Platinum	
Chile (IFPI Chile)	Platinum	
Colombia (ASINCOL)	Platinum+Gold	
Costa Rica	2× Platinum	
Ecuador	Gold	
Mexico (AMPROFON)	4× Platinum	600,000^{^}
Perú (UNIMPRO)	Gold	
Spain (Promusicae)	3× Platinum	400,000
United States (RIAA)	8× Platinum (Latin)	480,000
Venezuela (AVINPRO)	Gold	
Summaries
Central America (CFC)	Platinum	
Worldwide	—	3,000,000
^{^} Shipments figures based on certification alone.

== See also ==
- List of number-one Billboard Top Latin Albums of 2001
- List of number-one Billboard Latin Pop Albums from the 2000s
- Lo Nuestro Award for Pop Album of the Year
- List of best-selling albums in Mexico
- List of best-selling Latin albums
- Latin American music in the United States
- 2000 in Latin music
