= The One You Love (Paulina Rubio song) =

Single by Paulina Rubio

from the album Border Girl
- Released: 20 August 2002
- Studio: Protopia (New York City)
- Genre: Soft rock; power pop
- Length: 3:47 (English version); 3:36 (Spanish version)
- Label: Universal
- Songwriters: Brett James; Troy Verges
- Producers: Shep Goodman; Kenny Gioia

Paulina Rubio singles chronology
"Don't Say Goodbye" (2002)	"The One You Love" (2002)	"Casanova" (2002)

Audio video
- "The One You Love" on YouTube

Audio video
- "Todo Mi Amor" on YouTube

"The One You Love" is a song by Mexican singer Paulina Rubio from her sixth studio album, Border Girl (2002). It was written by Brett James and Troy Verges, and produced by Shep Goodman and Kenny Gioia. The song was released as the third US and second international single from Border Girl on 20 August 2002, by Universal Records. A Spanish version, "Todo Mi Amor" ("All My Love"), was also recorded and released to the Latin American market.

Musically, "The One You Love" is a soft rock and power pop song which, lyrically, describes the singer falling in love, and her desire to satisfying lover's needs. Upon its release, the song received positive reviews from music critics. Commercially, the Spanish version was more successful than the English version. It reached the top ten in several countries, including Ecuador, Mexico, Spain, Paraguay and Venezuela. "The One You Love" peaked at number 97 on the Billboard Hot 100, while "Todo Mi Amor" reached at number 5 on the Hot Latin Songs.

== Composition ==
"The One You Love"
A 40-second sample of "The One You Love" containing a part of the chorus.

Produced by Shep Goodman and Kenny Gioia, "The One You Love" is a soft rock and power pop ballad driven by a Latin beat and flamenco guitar accents. Includes instrumentation of bass, guitar, and drums. Rubio began working on the song at Protopia Studios in New York City in late 2001. She announced in an interview for MTV Latino that she wanted to find a "fresh essence" for the album, which achieved with the help of the producers. Rubio also revealed that she was experimenting with electric and acoustic guitars.

== Reception ==
"The One You Love" received positive reviews from music critics. Chuck Taylor from Billboard praised the song's production. Jon-Wiederhorn from MTV noted the song is an "effervescent pop melody colored with flamenco guitar", while Terra's staff described it as a "fresh song", thanks to the guitar and drum instrumentation.

== Formats and track listings ==
US CD single

1. "The One You Love" – 3:47

Mexican CD single

1. "Todo Mi Amor" – 3:36
2. "The One You Love" – 3:47

Spanish CD single

1. "Todo Mi Amor" – 3:36

== Credits and personnel ==
Credits are lifted from the US CD single liner notes.

- Paulina Rubio – lead vocals, background vocals
- Audrey Martells – background vocals
- Katie Agresta – vocal coach
- Troy Verges – writing
- Brett James – writing
- Shep Goodman – producer, guitars, bass guitar
- Kenny Gioia – producer, drums
- Bob Rosa – mixing at Protopia Studios
- Craig Smith – mixing at Protopia Studios

== Charts ==
=== Weekly charts ===
Weekly chart performance for "The One You Love"
Chart (2002–2003)	Peak position
US Billboard Hot 100	97
Venezuela (El Siglo de Torreón)	3

Weekly chart performance for "Todo Mi Amor"
Chart (2002–2003)	Peak position
Ecuador (El Siglo de Torreón)	4
Mexico (El Siglo de Torreón)	5
Paraguay Airplay	6
Spain (AFYVE)	10
US Hot Latin Songs (Billboard)	5
US Latin Pop Airplay (Billboard)	2
US Tropical Airplay (Billboard)	8

=== Year-end charts ===
Year-end chart performance for "Todo Mi Amor"
Chart (2002)	Position
US Hot Latin Tracks (Billboard)	40
US Latin Pop Airplay (Billboard)	34
