= Vive el Verano =

- Spain "remixes" cover art

Single by Paulina Rubio

from the album Paulina
- B-side: "Lo Haré Por Ti"
- Released: July 4, 1999 (promo released); June 9, 2001 (single released)
- Recorded: 1998
- Studio: Code Estudios (Madrid)
- Genre: Latin pop
- Length: 4:10
- Label: Universal Latino; Muxxic; Mercury Records
- Songwriters: Richard Daniel Roman; Ignacio Ballesteros
- Producer: Francisco Pellicer

Paulina Rubio singles chronology
"Yo No Soy Esa Mujer" (2001)	"Vive el Verano" (1999)	"Sexi Dance" (2001)

Audio video
- "Vive El Verano" on YouTube

"Vive El Verano" (transl. "Live The Summer") is a song by Mexican singer Paulina Rubio from her fifth studio album, Paulina (2000). It was released first as a promotional single on July 4, 1999, by Universal Spain, and then as the fifth single from the album in Europe by Universal Latino, Polydor, Muxxic and Mercury on June 9, 2001. The singer first recorded the vocals for the track in Madrid —which were later re-recorded for the 'album version' of the song— for a television Spanish show by Antena 3 titled of the same name, where Rubio hosted. The Latin pop song was written by Richard Daniel Roman and Ignacio Ballesteros, and was produced by Francisco Pellicer.

"Vive El Verano" received mixed to positive reviews from music critics, who praised its production. The song achieved success in Europe, debuting on the charts in Italy and Spain. Due to demand of the song an unofficial music video was released only in European television channels. It portrays Rubio sings and dances during the majority of the video. Rubio has performed "Vive El Verano" in Festival di Sanremo, Festival of Viña del Mar and Música Sí.

== Background ==
After recording some songs for her fifth studio album during 1998 and 1999, Rubio was asked to host a television show to the Spanish network Antena 3. Entitled Vive El Verano, the show featured a variety of sections from music to fashion. The singer was tasked with performing the TV show's entrance theme, so she got together with Francisco Pellicer to compose the song. She first recorded a track called "Es El Verano", and then another with the same title as the TV show. "Vive El Verano" was composed by British songwriter Richard Daniel Roman and Spanish songwriter Ignacio Ballesteros. Pellicer was in charge of the production, while the recording was done at Code Studios in Madrid, Spain.

== Music and lyrics ==
"Vive El Verano" is a Latin pop song that incorporates elements of dance, disco and salsa. Lyrically, it is an ode to the vitality, joy and freedom that the summer season brings.

== Commercial performance ==
"Vive El Verano" had limited but high success, due to being released in Europe and receiving a limited release in Latin American. In Spain, the song atop on the Los 40 airplay chart in the week of August 31, and became Rubio's second number-one single in the region.

== Track listing and formats ==
- Spanish CD Single (1999 released)
1. "Vive El Verano" (Latin Version) – 4:13
2. "Vive El Verano" (Dance Version) – 4:13
- Spanish CD Single (2001 released)
1. "Vive El Verano" – 4:10
- Spanish CD Single
1. "Vive El Verano" – 4:10
2. "Love Me Forever" – 4:10
- Spanish Remixes
1. "Vive El Verano" (Latin Remix) – 3:57
2. "Vive El Verano" (Dance Remix) – 4:08
3. "Love Me Forever" (Latin Remix) – 3:57
4. "Love Me Forever" (Dance Remix) – 4:08
5. "Vive El Verano" (Album Version) – 4:10
- Italian 12" Vinyl
1. A-1. "Vive El Verano" – 4:10
2. A-2. "Lo Haré Por Ti" (Album Version) – 4:41
3. B-1. "Lo Haré Por Ti" (Mijangos Extended Version) – 10:03
- Italian CD Single
1. "Vive El Verano" – 4:10
2. "Tan Sola" – 5:20
3. "Baby Paulina" – 0:18

== Charts ==
=== Weekly charts ===
Weekly chart performance for "Vive El Verano"
Chart (2001–2002)	Peak position
Italy (FIMI)	31
Italy Airplay (Music & Media)	20
Italy (Musica e Dischi)	32
Spain (Music & Media)	4
Spain Singles Chart	11

=== Year-end charts ===
Year-end performance for "Vive El Verano"
Chart (2001)	Peak position
Spain (AFYVE)	27

== Release history ==
Country	Date	Format	Label
Switzerland	March 9, 2002	Contemporary hit radio	Universal
