= Willie "Pdub" Moore Jr. =

Willie Moore Jr.
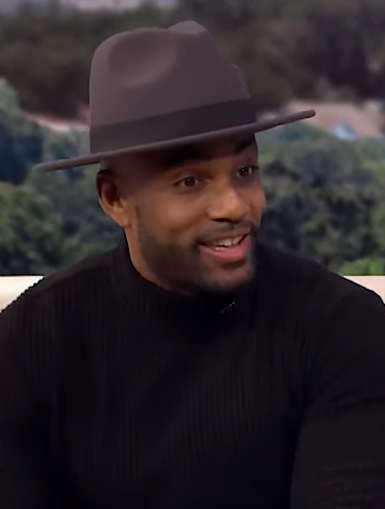
- Moore in 2019

Background information
- Also known as: P-Dub, Pretty Willie
- Born: William Moore Jr. St. Louis County, Missouri, U.S.
- Origin: St. Louis, Missouri, U.S.
- Genres: R&B; hip hop; gospel
- Occupations: Singer, Comedian, Radio host
- Instrument: Vocals
- Years active: 2004–present
- Labels: Universal; Warner Bros
- Website: www.williemoorejr.org

William Moore Jr. (born December 20, 1978), better known by his stage names Pretty Willie, Willie Moore, and P-Dub, is an actor, comedian, producer, speaker, radio host, singer and licensed minister from St. Louis, Missouri.

== Discography ==
=== Studio albums ===
List of studio albums, with selected chart positions
Title	Album details	Peak chart positions		
Title	Album details	US Christ	US Gos	US Heat
Best of Both Worlds: The Album	Released: 2012; CD, digital download	42	27	25
Impress-Single	Released: 2014; digital download			
The Turning Point	Released: 2011; CD, digital download			

== Divorce ==
Divorce

After 15 years of marriage, Moore announced in October 2022 that he and his wife had decided to get divorced. The decision was made following two years of counseling, a year of separation, and a year of legal proceedings. Moore says that this was one of the hardest choices he's ever had to make, and by being open about his experience, he hopes to offer some comfort and understanding to others who might be facing similar struggles.
