= Richard Daniel Roman =

British songwriter and record producer (born 1965)

- Born: 16 March 1965 (age 60); London, England
- Occupation(s): Songwriter, record producer
- Children: One

Richard Daniel Roman (born 16 March 1965 in Kings Cross, London) is a British songwriter and record producer, best known for his collaborations with pop musicians.

== Biography ==
Roman was born in 1965 to Spanish parents. In 1992, he moved to Spain where he established himself as a major Latin pop songwriter and producer, collaborating with some of the biggest names in the entertainment industry.

Roman has worked with artists such as Paulina Rubio (Vive El Verano), Xuxa, Rebeca, Lorena Rojas, Shaila Durcal, Cristian Castro, Jerry Rivera, and others.

== Selected discography ==
- Paulina Rubio - Paulina (Universal Latino)
- Rebeca - Rebelde (Max Music)
- Xuxa - El Mundo Es De Los Dos (Universal Latino)

== Sources ==
- AMG Music Guide
- ASCAP
- RIAA
