= One Horizon Group =

One Horizon Group, Plc
- Type: Public Limited Company
- Industry: Software
- Predecessor: Satcom Group Holdings
- Founder: Brian Collins
- Headquarters: United Kingdom
- Area served: Worldwide
- Products: Blockchain and mobile Voice over IP
- Revenue: ▼US$312 thousand (2016)
- Website: onehorizongroup.co.uk

One Horizon Group, Plc. is a technology company that licenses software.

== History ==
One Horizon Group started in the banking software industry operating as Abbey Technology that developed and licensed its software to banks in Switzerland and also licensed its software through banking software distributor Finnova AG. The core of the Abbey Technology suite of products was a proprietary web application server with customized add-on components designed and delivered to customers requirements.

In November 2010, Abbey Technology merged with Satcom Group Holdings and Brian Collins joined the board of the new company as Chief Technology Officer while continuing as CEO of the wholly owned subsidiary Abbey Technology. The company focused its R&D efforts on developing the Horizon platform for mobile network operators. Shortly after the merger, on 21 January 2011, the Company changed its name from SatCom Group Holdings to One Horizon Group.

In 2012, the company announced plans for an initial public offering in Hong Kong. In October, the company sold the Satcom Global business and all the subsidiaries involved in satellite communications to Broadband Satellite Services Limited. In November, a Securities Exchange Agreement was completed between Intelligent Communication Enterprise Corporation and One Horizon Group. Following this, in December, the American company filed to change its name from Intelligent Communication Enterprise Corporation to One Horizon Group, Inc. FINRA approved this change, effective 31 January 2013. Along with the name change, Intelligent Communication Enterprise Corporation also filed with Finra to change its ticker symbol from ICMC to OHGI, this was also approved.

On 17 September 2013, the company opened a new software research and development office in the Nexus Innovation Centre on the campus of the University of Limerick in Ireland. On 2 July 2014, the company received approval by NASDAQ's Listing Qualifications Department to list its common stock on the NASDAQ Capital Market. The common stock commenced trading on the NASDAQ Capital Market on 3 July 2014 under the same ticker symbol OHGI.

On August 11, 2017, the Company consummated a Stock Purchase Agreement pursuant to which Brian J. Collins, the Company’s previous Chief Executive Officer, acquired the outstanding capital stock in four of the Company’s subsidiaries Horizon Globex GmbH, Horizon Globex Ireland Ltd., One Horizon Group Plc. and Abbey Technology GmbH. Upon conclusion of the Stock Purchase Agreement Mr. Collins resigned from all positions held within One Horizon Group, Inc. and took ownership of One Horizon Group Plc.

On 26 September 2019, One Horizon Group, Inc. has announced it has signed a binding agreement to acquire Midnight Gaming, a leading brand in the entertainment space of Esports, subject to the terms of closing. The Company also announced an immediate effective name change to Touchpoint Group Holdings, Inc. which represents the expanded focus of the Company on digital marketing and entertainment.
