= Lo Haré Por Ti =

Single by Paulina Rubio

Single by Paulina Rubio

from the album Paulina
- B-side: "Y Yo Sigo Aquí"
- Released: January 11, 2000
- Recorded: 1999
- Genre: Latin pop; rock en español
- Length: 4:41
- Label: Universal Latino; Muxxic; Polydor
- Songwriter: Estéfano
- Producer: Chris Rodriguez

Paulina Rubio singles chronology
"Enamorada" (1997)	"Lo Haré Por Ti" (2000)	"El Último Adiós" (2000)

Music video
- "Lo Haré Por Ti" on YouTube

"Lo Haré Por Ti" (transl. "I'll Do It For You") is a song recorded by Mexican singer Paulina Rubio for her fifth studio album Paulina (2000). Written by Estefano and produced by Chris Rodriguez, the bolero-influenced pop rock song was then released as the lead single from Paulina on January 11, 2000, through Universal Music Latin, Polydor Records and Muxxic Records (in Spain). The song marks Rubio's "comeback" single after the dissolution of her contract with EMI in the late 1990s. Lyrically, the song is about a woman who is willing to do anything for the man she loves, with refers to the tangos of the French Argentine artist Carlos Gardel.

== Reception ==
=== Critical ===
Upon its release, "Lo Haré Por Ti" was considered Rubio's "comeback" single after the dissolution of her music contract with EMI in the late 1990s. The song received acclaim reviews from music critics, who singled it out as one of the highlights from the album and praised the singer for her new musical style. Billboard's Leila Cobo said that "[the song is] an edgy, catchy, totally fresh romp". She also appreciated that thanks to this single chosen by the lead single, helped make the album a success.

=== Commercial ===
Commercially, the single was a success in Latin American and some European countries. In Spain, "Lo Haré Por Ti" ascended to the top ten airplay Los 40 Principales, finally peaking at number eight on the week of October 21, 2000.

== Music video ==
The accompanying music video for "Lo Haré Por Ti" was directed by Carlos Somonte and it was filmed in Acapulco, Guerrero in Mexico. As the song was meant to be Rubio's "comeback" single, it marked a clip with "a more innovative style" and different from her previous productions. The video premiered worldwide on March 20, 2000.

In a retrospective review, El Heraldo de México noted the great influence of Rubio's style on the culture, claiming that many girls wanted to imitate her style "with the iconic hat."

== Track listing and formats ==
- US CD Single
1. "Lo Haré Por Ti" (Album Remix) – 3:55
- Spanish CD Single
1. "Lo Haré Por Ti" – 4:41
- Spanish CD Remix
1. "Lo Haré Por Ti" (Single Remix) – 4:02
- Spanish Remixes
1. "Lo Haré Por Ti" (Album Version) – 4:41
2. "Lo Haré Por Ti" (Radio Remix) – 4:02
3. "Lo Haré Por Ti" (Extended Remix) – 5:05
4. "Lo Haré Por Ti" (Single Remix) – 4:31
5. "Lo Haré Por Ti" (Extended Remix) – 6:10
- Mexican Vinyl 7"
1. A. "Lo Haré Por Ti" – 4:41
2. B. "Y Yo Sigo Aquí" – 4:13
- European CD Single
1. "Lo Haré Por Ti" (Album Version) – 4:41
2. "Lo Haré Por Ti" (Mijangos Radio Album Remix) - 4:14
- Brazilian Maxi Single—Remixes
1. "Lo Haré Por Ti" (Album Version) – 4:41
2. "Lo Haré Por Ti" (Hitmakers Radio Edit) – 3:51
3. "Lo Haré Por Ti" (Memé's Radio Hit) – 5:15
4. "Lo Haré Por Ti" (Mijangos Radio Edit) – 4:40
5. "Lo Haré Por Ti" (Single Remix) – 4:30
6. "Lo Haré Por Ti" (Hitmakers Extended Mix) – 4:57
7. "Lo Haré Por Ti" (Hitmakers Extended Club Mix) – 8:54
8. "Lo Haré Por Ti" (Mijangos Extended Mix) – 10:03
9. "Lo Haré Por Ti" (Extended Remix) – 5:08

== Charts ==
=== Weekly charts ===
Weekly chart performance for "Lo Haré Por Ti"
Chart (2000–2001)	Peak position
El Salvador (El Siglo de Torreón)	10
Europe (Border Breakers)	13
Honduras (El Siglo de Torreón)	1
Italy (Music & Media)	1
Italy (FIMI)	31
Italy (Musica e Dischi)	50
Panama (El Siglo de Torreón)	9
Mexico Baladas (Notimex)	4
Spanish Singles Chart	9
US Hot Latin Songs (Billboard)	13
US Latin Pop Airplay (Billboard)	7
US Tropical Songs (Billboard)	23

=== Year-end charts ===
Year-end performance for "Lo Haré Por Ti"
Chart (2001)	Peak position
Spain (PROMUSICAE)	34
