= Sexi Dance =

2001 single by Paulina Rubio

Single by Paulina Rubio

from the album Paulina and Border Girl
- Released: June 27, 2001
- Recorded: 1999
- Genre: Dance · house
- Length: 5:02
- Label: Universal Latino
- Songwriter: Estéfano
- Producer: Marcello Azevedo

Paulina Rubio singles chronology
"Vive El Verano" (2001)	"Sexi Dance" (2001)	"Tal Vez, Quizá" (2001)

Audio video
- "Sexi Dance" on YouTube

Audio video
- "Fire (Sexy Dance)" on YouTube

"Sexi Dance" is a song by Mexican recording artist Paulina Rubio from her fifth studio album, Paulina (2000). The song was written by Estéfano and produced by Marcello Azevedo. "Sexi Dance" is a dance-pop and house track that portrays sexual freedom. It was released as Paulinas sixth single on June 27, 2001 through Universal Latino.

Music critics picked the track as an instant standout from the album, praising its catchy melody and potential for a hit single. The song peaked at number 18 on the Billboard US Latin Pop Songs, while on the Hot Latin Songs peaked at number 34.

An English version of the song titled "Fire (Sexy Dance)" was released in 2002 as part of her crossover album Border Girl. It was a promotional single in USA and Universal Records released a vinyl with the original version.

== Video ==
The song doesn't have an official music video, but Paulina performed the song at the Festival de Viña del Mar in 2002 and 2005.

== Formats and track listings ==
7-inch single

1. "Sexi Dance" – 5:02
2. "Sin Aire" – 4:04

Mexico CD single

1. "Sexi Dance"

USA 12-inch single

1. "Fire (Sexy Dance)"
2. "Fire (Sexy Dance)"

== Charts ==
Chart (2001)	Peak position
US Hot Latin Songs (Billboard)	34
US Latin Pop Airplay (Billboard)	18
US Tropical Airplay (Billboard)	26
