= El Último Adiós =

2000 single by Paulina Rubio

Single by Paulina Rubio

from the album Paulina
- Released: July 17, 2000
- Recorded: 1999
- Genre: Latin pop; ranchera; hip-hop
- Length: 4:44
- Label: Universal Latino; Muxxic
- Songwriters: Estéfano; Paulina Rubio
- Producer: Chris Rodriguez

Paulina Rubio singles chronology
"Lo Haré Por Ti" (2000)	"El Último Adiós" (2000)	"Y Yo Sigo Aquí" (2000)

Alternative cover
- Mexican 1-track Promo CD

Music video
- "El Último Adiós" on YouTube

"El Último Adiós" (transl. "The Last Goodbye") is a song recorded by Mexican singer Paulina Rubio for her fifth studio album Paulina (2000). It was released as the second single from the album on July 17, 2000 by Universal Latino. Rubio co-wrote and co-produced the track with Estéfano, and was originally conceived it as a ranchera-hip-hop-styled song. Lyrically, its a break-up mood.

The song received positive reviews from music critics, who cited the song as one of the album's standouts and praised Rubio's vocals. In his album review from Amazon, Joey Guerra said "['El Último Adiós' is] the album's shining moment." Digital media About en Español included it in the list of the best "heartbreak songs". It attained commercial success, reaching the top of the record charts in Mexico, as well as the top five in several Latin America regions.

An English version of the song was released on Paulina's sixth studio album Border Girl in 2002.

== Composition ==
Paulina Rubio co-wrote and co-produced "El Último Adiós" with Estéfano, who is credited as an only songwriter. Chris Rodriguez produced the song. It is a pop with Mexican ranchera and hip-hop style song. Then Universal Music Mexico president, Marco Bissi, described it as "a fusion that breaks the rules of the game."

== Music video ==
Like many of Paulina's music videos, the music video for "El Último Adiós" was met with heavy criticism from the Latino community and Latin American critics (specifically in Mexico). The controversial video contained racy love scenes, as well as men and women appearing barely clothed. MTV Latin-America only aired the video after 9 pm due to its sexual content. An uncensored version of the video was also released. It contains some slight differences compared to the original version of the video, the major difference being that Rubio appears completely topless in parts of the video, and the racy love scenes are shown for a bit longer and are more explicit. In the video appears the Mariachi Gallos de México.

Billboard staff wrote in a retrospective review that "even in heartbreak, Paulina looks fabulous in tiny shorts and halter-tops."

== Impact ==
Since its release, "El Último Adiós" has been covered on numerous occasions. In 2001, regional Mexican singer Jenni Rivera recorded a banda-style version of the song for their album Déjate Amar. Mexican singer and actress Eiza González took Rubio's ranchera-pop musical style as "reference" in her single "Invisible". She also said that she would "reference" the video of her in her own music video, but it never came out.. Italian band Bagutti re-recorded the song and they often play it live in their shows. It ended to be quite famous in Italy, althought It wasn't released as a single.

== Track listing and formats ==
- Mexican CD Single"
1. "El Último Adiós" – 4:45
- Spanish CD Single"
1. "El Último Adiós" (Radio Edit) – 3:58
- Argentine CD Single"
1. "El Último Adiós" – 4:45
2. "El Último Adiós" (enhanced video) – 4:52

== Charts ==
Chart (2000–2002)	Peak position
Costa Rica (El Siglo de Torreón)	1
El Salvador (El Siglo de Torreón)	1
Honduras (El Siglo de Torreón)	1
Nicaragua (El Siglo de Torreón)	3
Panama (El Siglo de Torreón)	1
Spain Airplay (Music & Media)	20
US Hot Latin Songs (Billboard)	18
US Latin Pop Airplay (Billboard)	13
US Regional Mexican Airplay (Billboard)	40
US Tropical Songs (Billboard)	24
