= Yo No Soy Esa Mujer =

Single by Paulina Rubio

from the album Paulina
- Released: April 2, 2001
- Recorded: 1999
- Studio: Midnight Studios (Miami, Florida)
- Genre: Latin pop; pop rock
- Length: 3:44
- Label: Universal Latino; Muxxic; Polydor
- Songwriters: Christian De Walden; Ralf Stemmann; Carlos Toro Montoro
- Producer: Marcello Azevedo

Paulina Rubio singles chronology
"Y Yo Sigo Aquí" (2000)	"Yo No Soy Esa Mujer" (2001)	"Vive El Verano" (2001)

Music video
- "Yo No Soy Esa Mujer" on YouTube

"Yo No Soy Esa Mujer" (transl. "I'm Not That Woman") is a song recorded by Mexican singer Paulina Rubio for her fifth studio album, Paulina (2000). It was released as the fourth single from Paulina on April 2, 2001. After meeting with its writers Christian De Walden and Ralf Stemmann in Spain, Rubio recorded several versions of the song, including a Spanish version written by Carlos Toro Montoro. The pop rock-inspired Latin pop song, produced by Marcello Azevedo, has self-empowerment lyrics.

Upon its release, "Yo No Soy Esa Mujer" received positive reviews from music critics, who described the song as both musically and lyrically innovative, and it is considered a feminist anthem and recognized as one of Rubio's signature songs. It also achieved commercial success, becoming Rubio's fourth single to reach number one in Mexico. In the United States, it peaked at number four and number seven on Billboard's Latin Pop Airplay and Hot Latin Tracks, respectively.

The accompanying music video for "Yo No Soy Esa Mujer", directed by Gustavo Garzón, was considered as a thematic adventure through Rubio's past videos. It received a "Best Music Video" nomination at the 3rd Annual Latin Grammy Awards. The original version of the song, "Not That Kind of Girl", was included on Rubio's sixth and first English studio album, Border Girl (2002). It not was released as a single, but Universal released the song to Australia, Italy, UK and US contemporary hit radio only.

== Composition and lyrics ==
"Yo No Soy Esa Mujer" incorporates a prominent guitar and bass sound, according to Billboard's staff "the track kicks off with a laid-back guitar loop that serves as the canvas to Rubio’s raspy voice." Lyrically, the song critique of sexism with the social taboo coverture and other marriage regulations. She addresses gender double standards through lines such as, "Nunca fue un contrato ni una imposición (It was never a contract or an imposition) / Yo no soy esa mujer, esa niña perdida, la que firma un papel y te entrega su vida (I am not that woman, that lost girl, the one who signs a paper and gives you her life)", evokes marriage. Many publications interpreted this part as Rubio's response to "the false idea of love" that dictates that women should stay home and be obedient.

The song reflected the social perception of feminism, especially through the lyrics "No me convertiré en el eco de tu voz / En un rincón, yo no soy esa mujer (I will not become the echo of your voice / In a corner, I am not that woman)".

== Music video ==
The accompanying music video for "Yo No Soy Esa Mujer" was directed by Gustavo Garzón. The video includes several action films references, such as Mission: Impossible, Austin Powers and Charlie's Angels.

== Reception and cultural impact ==
In 2003, "Yo No Soy Esa Mujer" received the "Latin Award" at the 2003 BMI London Awards. Spin magazine included "Yo No Soy Esa Mujer" on their The 50 Best Songs of the Year 2000 list. The Ecuadorian news website Expreso highlighted it as a song "that penetrated the souls of the women who saw in its lyrics a hope to get out of submission and oppression, victims of those macho men." Journalist and professor Lourdes Casares de Félix wrote in a column for the Mexican newspaper AM that "Yo No Soy Esa Mujer" represented a cultural change in the perception of machismo. "How good that Paulina Rubio brought us a model of a woman who makes decisions and does not let herself be controlled." Also, the song has been analyzed by members of the King Juan Carlos University in a study of music and gender violence in Spain, choosing it as one of the examples "of songs in which a different female identity [from the patriarchal] is transmitted, far from the subordination and the classic stereotypes assigned to women".

In 2021, Billboard named it one of the 100 Greatest Songs of 2001, by noting it "soundtracked the golden age of Latin pop in the new millennium."

== Track listing and formats ==
Mexico/Spain CD single

1. "Yo No Soy Esa Mujer" – 3:44

Argentina CD single

1. "Yo No Soy Esa Mujer" – 3:44
2. "Yo No Soy Esa Mujer" (music video) – 3:54

== Charts ==
=== Weekly charts ===
Weekly performance for "Yo No Soy Esa Mujer"
Chart (2001)	Peak position
US Hot Latin Tracks (Billboard)	7
US Latin Pop Airplay (Billboard)	4
US Tropical Songs (Billboard)	16

=== Year-end charts ===
Year-end performance for "Yo No Soy Esa Mujer"
Chart (2001)	Peak position
US Hot Latin Songs (Billboard)	25
US Latin Pop Airplay (Billboard)	12
