= Bob Rosa =

American record producer

Bob Rosa is an American record producer who has worked with artists such as Madonna, Janet Jackson, Mariah Carey and Espen Lind. One of his first recording projects was working on the track "Planet Rock" by Afrika Bambaataa & the Soulsonic Force in 1982.

== Overview ==
Rosa's recording career has encompassed every genre of music, mixing pop, rock, dance, R&B and Latin. He has mixed the successful singles "Gonna Make You Sweat" by C&C Music Factory; Whitney Houston's "I'm Every Woman", Mariah Carey's "Emotions", *NSYNC's "God Must Have Spent A Little More Time On You". He also received two Grammy Award nominations for Best Dance Track for remixes of Gloria Estefan's "Heaven's What I Feel" and "Don't Let This Moment End", a Latin Grammy win in 2002 for his work on Alejandra Guzmán's Soy album, and a Grammy win for the Best Reggae Album by Toots & The Maytals in 2005 (True Love).

== Discography ==
- 1981 Gang War Prince Charles & the City Beat Band Engineer, Mixing
- 1982 Stone Killers Prince Charles & the City Beat Band Engineer, Mixing
- 1983 Planet Patrol Planet Patrol Engineer
- 1984 Combat Zone Prince Charles & the City Beat Band
- 1984 No Tellin' Lies Zebra Programming, Engineer
- 1984 Tina B Tina B Engineer
- 1985 9.9 9.9 Drums, Mixing
- 1985 Restless Starpoint Engineer
- 1985 Rock Me Tonight Freddie Jackson Engineer
- 1985 Standing on the Edge [Bonus Track] Cheap Trick Engineer
- 1985 Standing on the Edge Cheap Trick Engineer
- 1986 Book of Love Book of Love Mixing
- 1986 Destiny Chaka Khan Engineer
- 1986 Genobia Genobia Jeter Mixing
- 1986 Just Like the First Time Freddie Jackson Engineer
- 1986 Never Felt So Good James Ingram Drums
- 1987 Control: The Remixes Janet Jackson Remixing
- 1987 Hunger Michael Bolton Engineer, Mixing
- 1987 Let It Be Me Audrey Wheeler Engineer, Mixing
- 1987 Picture Me Ava Cherry Engineer
- 1987 Primitive Cool Mick Jagger Engineer
- 1987 Sensational Starpoint Engineer
- 1987 Walter Beasley [Circuit City Exclusive] Walter Beasley Engineer, Mixing
- 1987 Walter Beasley Walter Beasley Engineer, Mixing
- 1988 New Age Bach: The Goldberg Variations Joel Spiegelman Engineer
- 1988 Tommy Page Tommy Page Mixing
- 1988 Will Downing Will Downing Engineer, Mixing
- 1989 Decade: Greatest Hits Duran Duran Mixing
- 1989 Home Stephanie Mills Mixing
- 1989 Passion in the Heart Shirley Lewis Mixing
- 1990 Fox Akio Dobashi Engineer, Mixing
- 1990 Gonna Make You Sweat C+C Music Factory/Clivilles & Cole Mixing
- 1990 Hack Information Society Engineer, Mixing
- 1990 Remixed Prayers Madonna Remixing
- 1990 Shut Up and Dance: Dance Mixes Paula Abdul Remixing
- 1990 Smart Pack Debbie Gibson Engineer
- 1990 Unison Celine Dion Mixing
- 1990 Vertigo Boxcar Remixing
- 1991 Comfort Zone Vanessa Williams Sampling, Beats, Production Concept, Sample Programming
- 1991 Emotions Mariah Carey Mixing
- 1991 Here We Go [CD Single] C+C Music Factory Mixing
- 1991 Let the Beat Hit 'Em [Single] Lisa Lisa & Cult Jam Engineer, Editing, Mixing
- 1991 Mistaken Identity Donna Summer Engineer
- 1991 Straight Outta Hell's Kitchen Lisa Lisa & Cult Jam Editing, Mixing
- 1992 Bodyguard [Japan Bonus Track] Original Soundtrack Mixing
- 1992 Bodyguard Original Soundtrack Mixing
- 1992 Don't Stop...Planet Rock (The Remix EP) Afrika Bambaataa & the Soulsonic Force Engineer
- 1992 Greatest Hitz: Cash Cash Money Prince Charles & the City Beat Band Engineer
- 1992 Greatest Remixes Vol. 1 Clivillés & Cole Editing, Mixing
- 1992 Healing Stevie B Mixing
- 1992 Salutations from the Ghetto Nation Warrior Soul Engineer, Mixing
- 1992 Salutations from the Ghetto Nation Warrior Soul Engineer, Mixing
- 1993 Hits 1 Prince Mixing
- 1993 Love Remembers George Benson Mixing
- 1993 Music Box [Bonus Track] Mariah Carey Mixing
- 1993 Music Box Mariah Carey Engineer, Mixing
- 1993 Send Me a Lover [Arista #1] Taylor Dayne Mixing
- 1993 Toni Braxton [Bonus Track] Toni Braxton Mixing
- 1993 Toni Braxton Toni Braxton Mixing
- 1994 Anything Goes! C+C Music Factory Producer, Engineer, Mixing
- 1994 Greatest Hits (1980–1994) Aretha Franklin Engineer, Mixing
- 1994 Robi-Rob's Boriqua Anthem C+C Music Factory Featuring Trilogy Producer, Engineer, Mixing
- 1994 Star Funk, Vol. 12 Various Artists Engineer, Mixing
- 1994 Storyteller Crystal Waters Mixing
- 1995 Best of Branigan Laura Branigan Mixing
- 1995 Best of Tina B: Honey to a Bee Tina B Engineer
- 1995 Greatest Hits Laura Branigan Mixing
- 1995 Greatest Hits Taylor Dayne Mixing
- 1995 Greetings from the Gutter Dave Stewart Mixing
- 1995 Sister Act 2: Back in the Habit Original Soundtrack Engineer, Mixing
- 1995 Ultimate C+C Music Factory Engineer
- 1995 We've Got It Goin On [Import] Backstreet Boys Mixing
- 1996 100% Pure Dance Various Artists Mixing
- 1996 Cutting's Ultimate Freestyle Medleys, Vol. 1 Various Artists Mixing
- 1996 For Old Times Sake: The Freddie Jackson Story Freddie Jackson Engineer
- 1996 For Old Times Sake: The Freddie Jackson Story Freddie Jackson Engineer
- 1996 Vibrolush Vibrolush Mixing
- 1996 Vibrolush Vibrolush Mixing
- 1996 Waiting for Your Love Stevie B Mixing
- 1997 Alan, Elvis & God Something Happens Mixing
- 1997 Blood on the Dance Floor [4 Track Single] Michael Jackson Mixing
- 1997 Blood on the Dance Floor: History in the Mix Michael Jackson Producer, Mixing
- 1997 Dame Un Poco Mas Nayobe Remixing
- 1997 Free (Yes I'm Free) Nancey Jackson Mixing
- 1997 I'd Really Love to See You Tonight (Dance Mixes) Barry Manilow Producer, Engineer, Mixing
- 1997 I'd Really Love to See You Tonight [Single] Barry Manilow Engineer, Mixing
- 1997 Like a Star Cynthia Mixing
- 1997 One More Time The Real McCoy Engineer, Mixing
- 1997 Power 106 FM: 10th Anniversary Compilation Various Artists Producer
- 1997 Red Espen Lind Producer, Mixing
- 1997 Samantha Cole Samantha Cole Mixing
- 1997 Secada [Spanish Version] Jon Secada Engineer, Remixing, Mixing
- 1997 Secada Jon Secada Engineer, Remixing, Mixing
- 1997 You Don't Know [US #2] Cyndi Lauper Engineer, Mixing
- 1998 #1's [Import Bonus Tracks] Mariah Carey Engineer, Mixing Engineer
- 1998 #1's Mariah Carey Engineer, Mixing
- 1998 *NSYNC [Australian Bonus Tracks] *NSYNC Mixing
- 1998 *NSYNC [Australia] *NSYNC Mixing
- 1998 *NSYNC [Japan Bonus Tracks] *NSYNC Mixing
- 1998 98° and Rising [Holland Bonus Tracks] 98° Engineer, Mixing
- 1998 98° and Rising 98° Engineer, Mixing
- 1998 Gloria! Gloria Estefan Mixing
- 1998 Greatest Hits [Warlock] The Cover Girls Mixing
- 1998 Greatest Hits: The First Ten Years Vanessa Williams Producer, Sampling, Beats
- 1998 Greatest [Bonus DVD] Duran Duran Mixing
- 1998 Greatest [Deluxe Edition] [Clean] Duran Duran Mixing
- 1998 Greatest [Deluxe Edition] Duran Duran Mixing
- 1998 Greatest Duran Duran Mixing
- 1998 Hard Knock Life [CD5/Cassette Single] Jay-Z Remixing, Audio Production
- 1998 Hello Laila Laila Mixing
- 1998 I Think Too Much Settie Mixing
- 1998 Welcome to the Epidrome Various Artists Remixing
- 1998 Where We Belong [Universal] Boyzone Mixing
- 1999 Celine Dion/Unison Celine Dion Mixing
- 1999 Heat It Up 98° Producer, Engineer, Mixing, Mixing Engineer
- 1999 Smoke This Lynch Mob Mixing
- 2000 Average Day Aztek Trip Mixing
- 2000 Blow It Out Your Ass Flipp Producer, Mixing
- 2000 New R&B Essentials Various Artists Producer
- 2000 Phoenix Stone Phoenix Stone Mixing
- 2000 Revelation [Import Bonus Track] 98° Mixing
- 2000 Revelation 98° Mixing
- 2000 Smooth Jams: New R&B Essentials Various Artists Producer
- 2001 FB Entertainment Presents: The Good Life [Clean] Various Artists Engineer, Mixing
- 2001 FB Entertainment Presents: The Good Life Various Artists Engineer, Mixing
- 2001 Greatest Hits, Vol. 2 [Bonus Track] Gloria Estefan Mixing
- 2001 Greatest Hits, Vol. II Gloria Estefan Mixing
- 2001 Looking for the Perfect Beat: 1980–1985 Afrika Bambaataa Engineer
- 2001 M.Y.O.B Deborah Gibson Arranger, Recorder, Mixing
- 2001 Music Box/Emotions/Mariah Carey Mariah Carey Mixing Engineer
- 2001 No Tellin' Lies/3.V Zebra Programming, Engineer
- 2001 Settie Settie Mixing
- 2001 Soy Alejandra Guzmán Engineer
- 2001 Stranger Than Fiction Ultra Naté Engineer
- 2002 Border Girl by Paulina Rubio Engineer, Mixing, Vocal Engineer, Vocal Producer
- 2002 Collection: Unison/Celine Dion/The Colour of My Love Celine Dion Mixing 2002 Collection 98° Engineer, Mixing
- 2002 Emotions/Vanishing Mariah Carey Mixing
- 2002 Marie Sisters Marie Sisters Mixing
- 2002 Medicine Man Richie Booker Mixing
- 2002 Unison/Celine Dion/The Colour of My Love Celine Dion Mixing
- 2002 Volume Flipp Producer
- 2002 Walk to Remember Original Soundtrack Mixing
- 2003 20th Century Masters - The Millennium Collection: The Vanessa Williams Producer, Sampling, Beats
- 2003 Becstasy Becky Baeling Mixing
- 2003 Ednita Por Ti Ednita Nazario Engineer, Mixing
- 2003 For You Jonathan Pierce Mixing
- 2003 Justin Guarini Justin Guarini Assistant Vocal Engineer
- 2003 MVP M.V.P. (Most Valuable Playas) Mixing, Assistant Producer
- 2003 Roc Ya Body (Mic Check 1, 2) [CD #1] M.V.P. (Most Valuable Playas) Mixing
- 2003 Sunshine After Rain Rita Marley Mixing
- 2003 Universal Smash Hits, Vol. 2 Various Artists Mixing
- 2004 Bangin 3: Progressive Beats DJ Escape Producer
- 2004 Go All Night Del Producer, Mixing
- 2004 Navidad Con Sabor Reggaeton Various Artists Mixing
- 2004 Singles 1986–1995 Duran Duran Mixing
- 2004 Singles 1986–1995 Duran Duran Mixing
- 2004 True Love [Import Version] Toots & the Maytals Engineer
- 2004 True Love Toots & the Maytals Engineer
- 2004 Two Shots Matt Dusk Engineer
- 2004 Wonderful Life Lara Fabian Engineer
- 2005 100% Black Novenoe Volumen [DVD] Various Artists Engineer, Mixing
- 2005 A Mi Manera Inés Gaviria Mixing
- 2005 Apasionada Ednita Nazario Mixing
- 2005 Greatest Hits *NSYNC Mixing
- 2005 Same Dream [Bonus Tracks] Jon Secada Composer, Producer, Engineer, Mixing
- 2005 Why Should I Believe You: The Remixes Jenna Drey Mastering, Mixing
- 2006 Blood on the Dance Floor/Invincible Michael Jackson Producer, Mixing
- 2006 By the Way [6 Tracks] Jenna Drey Mixing
- 2006 Dance Party 2007 The Happy Boys Mixing
- 2006 Hurt Christina Aguilera Mixing
- 2006 One Step Further Jenna Drey Mixing
- 2006 Ultimate Prince Mixing
- 2006 Ultimate Prince Mixing
- 2007 Perfect Playlist Dance, Vol. 3 Various Artists Mixing
- 2007 To Mars from Babylon Big Bang Radio Producer, Engineer, Mixing
- 2007 Transport Systems Ari Gold Executive Producer, Drum Programming, Mastering, Mixing
- 2007 Very Best of Mick Jagger [Limited Deluxe Edition] [CD Mick Jagger Engineer
- 2007 Very Best of Mick Jagger Mick Jagger Engineer
- 2008 All Out of Love Jenna Drey Mixing
- 2008 Greatest [CD/2 DVD] Duran Duran Mixing
- 2008 King of Pop [Australia] Michael Jackson Producer, Mixing
- 2008 King of Pop [UK Deluxe Edition] Michael Jackson Producer
- 2008 King of Pop Michael Jackson Producer, Mixing
- 2008 Music Box/Butterfly Mariah Carey Engineer, Mixing
- 2008 Pacha NY Jonathan Peters Mixing
- 2008 Where the Music Takes You Ari Gold Mastering
- 2009 Human Ari Gold Mixing
- 2009 Party Groove: Gaydays, Vol. 6 DJ Randy Bettis Mixing
