= Jodi Marr =

American songwriter and record producer

Jodi Marr is an American songwriter and record producer. She won a Latin Grammy Award in 2003 for "De Verdad" on the album Soy by Alejandra Guzmán. She is best known for her collaboration on multiple songs with Casablanca/Universal artist MIKA including 'Grace Kelly', 'Love You When I'm Drunk', 'Make You Happy' and more. She also collaborated with UK artist Paloma Faith's 2009 debut album, co-writing and co-producing the single 'New York'.
