= Y Yo Sigo Aquí =

2000 song by Paulina Rubio

Single by Paulina Rubio

from the album Paulina
- Language: Spanish
- English title: "And I'm Still Here"
- Released: 13 November 2000
- Recorded: 1999
- Studio: Midnight Studios (Miami, Florida)
- Genre: Dance pop; electropop; Europop
- Length: 4:13
- Label: Universal Latino; Muxxic; Polydor
- Songwriter: Estéfano
- Producer: Marcello Azevedo

Paulina Rubio singles chronology
"El Último Adiós" (2000)	"Y Yo Sigo Aquí" (2000)	"Yo No Soy Esa Mujer" (2001)

Audio video
- "Y Yo Sigo Aquí" on YouTube

"Y Yo Sigo Aquí" (transl. "And I'm Still Here") is a song recorded by Mexican singer Paulina Rubio for her fifth studio album, Paulina (2000). It was released as the third single from the album on November 13, 2000. Also, it was released in January 2001 in the United States and Europe. Jointly written and composed by Estéfano, "Y Yo Sigo Aquí" is a dance pop and Europop song along pulses with a synthesized house and techno beat. It was one of the most successful songs of the year in the world and is recognized as one of Rubio's signature songs.

== Composition ==
"Y Yo Sigo Aquí" lasts for four minutes and fourteen seconds. It is composed in the key of C♯ major and is set in time signature of common time, with a moderate tempo of 126 beats per minute. Lyrically, the track discusses a female who flirtatiousness to her crush, expressing her romantic interest and sexual.

In their book "The Latin Beat : The Rhythms And Roots Of Latin Music From Bossa Nova To Salsa And Beyond", Ed Morales labelled it a Europop track that follow "vocal trend of a distorted voice that dominates European music, along pulses with a synthesized house beat", while Joey Guerra from Amazon album review claimed that it "showcase pulsing club rhythms." Most music specialists characterized it as a dance-pop song. Writing for the newspaper website El Periodico, the Catalan music critic Jordi Bianciotto identified the song "it mixed an incisive house rhythm with nods to Mexican folklore." He also said "Paulina sings with a distorted voice with ‘autotune’ very Cher," alluding to her song "Believe" of 1998.

== Commercial performance ==
"Y Yo Sigo Aquí" reached number one in several countries. In the United States, the song peaked at number three on the Billboard Hot Latin Songs chart on April 7, 2001, and became Rubio's best-reach US single since "Mío" (1993). In the same week, it reached number two on the Latin Pop Songs.

It is Rubio's strongest commercial breakthrough in the Europe, a region where she had previously achieved limited success. In Spain, "Y Yo Sigo Aquí" reached at number one on the Los 40 airplay chart in the week of April 13, and became Rubio's first number-one single in the region. According to the Sociedad General de Autores y Editores, "Y Yo Sigo Aquí" was the third most programmed song on the radio in 2001 in Spain.

== Music video ==
A music video for "Y Yo Sigo Aquí" was shot by Gustavo Garzón. It premiere in December 2000, on MTV Español.

== Awards and nominations ==
The song received a nomination for the Latin Grammy Award for Song of the Year at the 2001 ceremony. The song and music video received Lo Nuestro Awards nominations in 2002; the same year, "Y Yo Sigo Aquí" ranked third on the poll for the best all-time Spanish song in the United States by Univision, after "Piel Morena" by Mexican singer Thalía and "No Sé Tú" by Mexican-American singer Luis Miguel.

== Cultural impact ==
According to the musical section of the Spanish tabloid Diario AS, "Y Yo Sigo Aqui" is considered one of Rubio's songs from the 2000s that marked a resounding success in Spain. Epik journalist María Lovera mentioned that "both in the melody and in the video clip [Rubio] marked a new stage in her career." Italian newspaper Il Giornale singled out the song as "one of the clearest examples of a summer catchphrase" that marked the summer of the early 2000s, and conquered Europe.

== Use in media ==
The song appear on the video games Black Bean Games Let's Dance With Mel B (2011). "Y Yo Sigo Aquí" is featured on HBO dramedy television series Generation in March 2021.

== Track listing and formats ==
- Mexican CD Single
1. "Y Yo Sigo Aquí" – 4:13
- Spanish CD Single
1. "Y Yo Sigo Aquí" – 4:13
- Spanish Remixes
1. "Y Yo Sigo Aquí" (Album Version) – 4:13
2. "Y Yo Sigo Aquí" (Radio Edit) – 3:15
3. "Y Yo Sigo Aquí" (Radio TV) – 3:13
4. "Y Yo Sigo Aquí" (Radio Instrumental) – 3:13
5. "Y Yo Sigo Aquí" (Club Mix) – 7:07
- Italian 12" Vinyl
1. A-1. "Y Yo Sigo Aquí" (F&M Extended Version) – 4:58
2. A-2. "Y Yo Sigo Aquí" (F&M Radio Version) – 3:33
3. B-1. "Y Yo Sigo Aquí" (Album Version) – 4:16
4. B-2. "Y Yo Sigo Aquí" (F&M Club Version) – 4:58
- Italian Remixes
1. "Y Yo Sigo Aquí" (Album Version) – 4:13
2. "Y Yo Sigo Aquí" (Club Mix) – 7:07
3. "Y Yo Sigo Aquí" (Club Radio Edit) – 3:15
4. "Y Yo Sigo Aquí (Sexual Lover)" (Spanglish) – 3:57
5. "Y Yo Sigo Aquí" (F&M Radio) – 3:32
- European CD Single
1. "Y Yo Sigo Aquí" (Album Version) – 4:13
2. "Y Yo Sigo Aquí" (Club Mix) – 7:27

== Charts ==
=== Weekly charts ===
Weekly chart performance for "Y Yo Sigo Aquí"
Chart (2001–2003)	Peak position
Europe (European Border Breakers)	25
Italy Airplay (Music & Media)	5
Italy (FIMI)	18
Italy (Musica e Dischi)	3
Paraguay	1
Spain (Promusicae)	15
Spain Airplay (Music & Media)	4
US Hot Latin Songs (Billboard)	3
US Latin Pop Airplay (Billboard)	2
US Latin Tropical Airplay (Billboard)	6

=== Year-end charts ===
Year-end performance for "Y Yo Sigo Aquí"
Chart (2001)	Peak position
Spain (PROMUSICAE)	7
US Hot Latin Songs (Billboard)	12
US Latin Pop Airplay (Billboard)	6
US Latin Tropical Airplay (Billboard)	18

== Release history ==
Country	Date	Format	Label
Mexico	November 11, 2000	Contemporary hit radio	Universal Latino
Italy	November 3, 2001	Contemporary hit radio	Universal Latino
Switzerland	November 3, 2001	Contemporary hit radio	Universal Latino

== I'll Be Right Here (Sexual Lover) ==
"I'll Be Right Here (Sexual Lover)"

Single by Paulina Rubio

from the album Border Girl
- Released: June 29, 2001
- Studio: Midnight Blue Studios (Miami, Florida)
- Genre: Dance-pop; Hi-NRG
- Length: 3:58
- Label: Universal Records
- Songwriters: Estéfano; Jodi Marr
- Producer: Doug Morris

Paulina Rubio singles chronology
"Yo No Soy Esa Mujer" (2001)	"I'll Be Right Here (Sexual Lover)" (2001)	"Don't Say Goodbye" (2002)

Music video
- "I'll Be Right Here" (Sexual Lover) on YouTube

Music video
- "Y Yo Sigo Aquí" (Alt. Version) on YouTube

=== Background and released ===
On June 26, 2001, Rubio announced the surprise release of an English version of "Y Yo Sigo Aquí", after the great international success of the song and the wide audience reach around the world. The English-translation was adapted by Jodi Marr. "I'll Be Right Here (Sexual Lover)" was released on June 29, 2001.

Doug Morris, then Universal chairman/CEO, sent the song to WPOW (96.5 FM) Power 96 Miami as a "a first English-language single" and was hugely popular "predominantly female listenership", according to a Billboard article.

Following its commercial release on radio stations in the United States and Canada, the song was released in the United Kingdom and Europe in spring 2002. English electronic dance music record label Almighty Records released a remix of the demo version of and the song changed the titled to "Sexual Lover". They announced:

Paulina Rubio is (we're told) South America's answer to Madonna! Her new single is the rather poptastic and very fun 'Sexual Lover' and Almighty have remixed the track ready for her planned European launch next year [2002]. Meanwhile, all Almighty fans hungry to get this mix will have to head off to Mexico or somewhere similar to grab a copy! — Almighty Records (2002)

Finally, "I'll Be Right Here (Sexual Lover)" was included with Rubio's sixth studio album Border Girl.

=== Reception ===
The music critics agreed that "I'll Be Right Here (Sexual Lover)" was a step towards a more dance sound. Frank Kogan from The Village Voice stated that the song "[is one] of the two great dance-sex tracks on Border Girl." According to Allmusic's Jose F. Promis, the sound capt a "Hi-NRG dance ditties." Joey Guerra from Amazon highlight the track as "the throbbing rhythm-club" of the album.

Commercially, "I'll Be Right Here (Sexual Lover)" reached top 50 singles chart in Czech Republic and becoming a hit on dance/electronic radio airplay in Russia. Rubio featured on the main cover of various artists compilation album Танцевальный Рай 14 (Dance Paradise 14) in 2003.

=== Music video ===
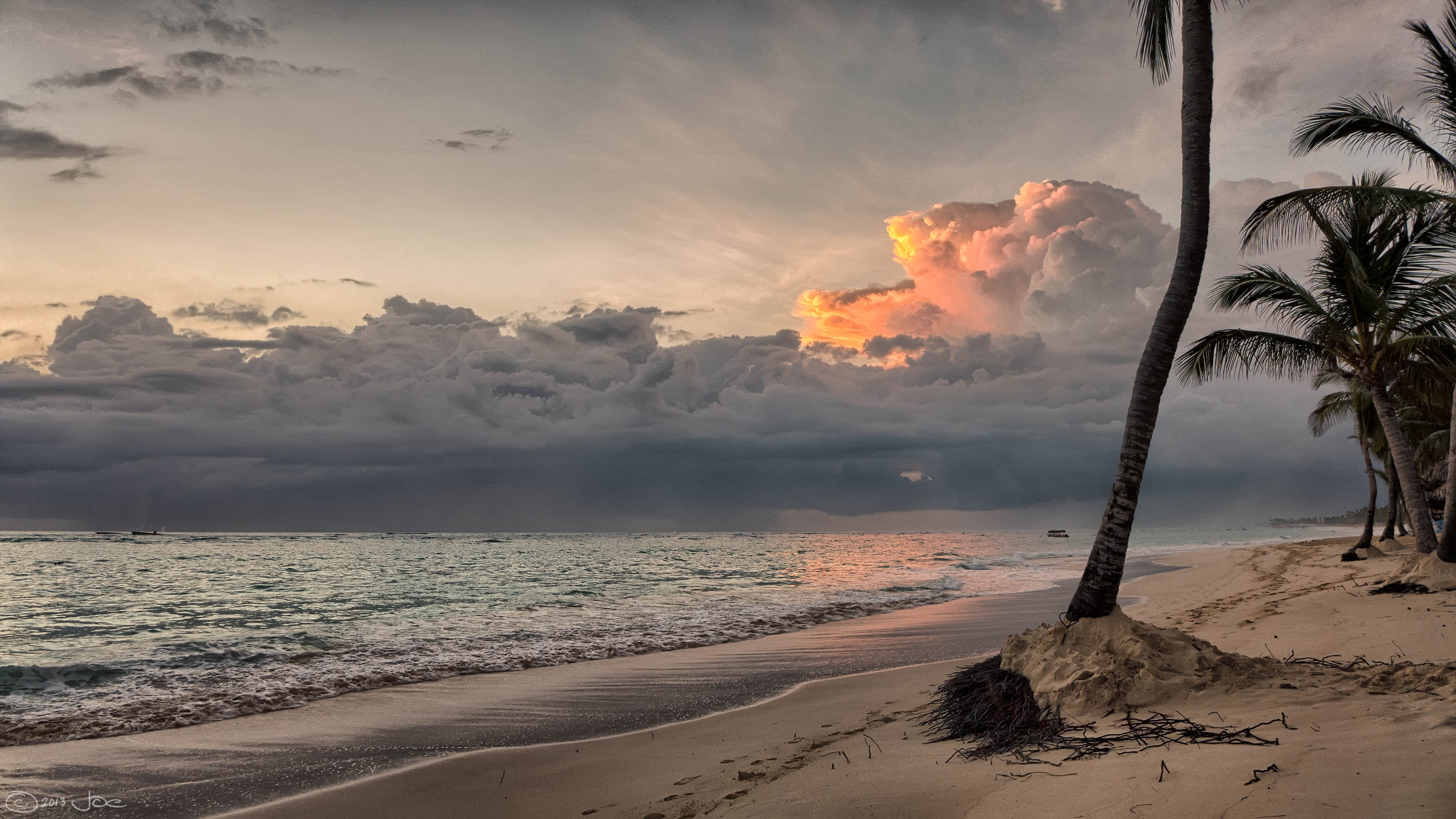
The video was filmed at Punta Cana, Dominican Republic

Colombia director Simón Brand directed the music video for "I'll Be Right Here (Sexual Lover)", was produced by Juan Basanta and filmed in Punta Cana resort town in the easternmost province of the Dominican Republic. Rubio's looks — her youthfulness, slim figure and blonde hair – had attracted comments on her sexual image. Basanta said then that the story of the video is "an oil party that shows the arrival of the sun with music. Erotic and sensual." Rubio is portrayed as a sexual girl to the music, dancing all day until she and the backup people are excited. Music video premiere on MTV Polska in March 2003.

The video begins with a DJ puts a record vinyl on the turntable. The next scene Rubio wake up in a bed around guys and girls while singing the song; they are soon joined by Rubio, who has wavy light-blonde hair and stunning. The setting changes to the beach where Rubio, wearing a leopard print bikini, dances with the guys. Then she goes to the water and starts flirting with the others. Again in the bar, Rubio dances between two girls who begin to put oil on her; now she is wearing an orange top and cutoff shorts. Some people take lollipops while she dances. Rubio and the guys dance and they meet on the floor. It alternates scenes featuring her entangled with a group of half-naked people. The video ends as she laughs and puts her arms around two girls.

In a retrospective review by Billboard staff they wrote, "she has always relished that bad-ass, hard-partying persona" and described her as the "Ultimate Party Girl" while "strutting in a cheetah print bikini." ¡Hola!'s staff wrote "Paulina acts as the host of a great beach party where love and sensuality predominate."

The music video was known as "Sexual Lover" on music television networks. An "uncensored version" was published in English and Spanish and an "alternative version" of the Spanish version only.

=== Track listings and formats ===
- US CD single
1. "I'll Be Right Here (Sexual Lover)" (Radio Edit) – 2:57
- UK CD single
1. "I'll Be Right Here (Sexual Lover)" (Radio Edit) – 2:57
2. "Y Yo Sigo Aquí" (Spanglish Version) – 4:07
3. "Y Yo Sigo Aquí" (Album Version) – 3:59
- European CD, Maxi-Single, Enhanced
1. "I'll Be Right Here (Sexual Lover)" (Radio Edit) – 3:59
2. "I'll Be Right Here (Sexual Lover)" (Baston & Burnz Mix) – 7:22
3. "Y Yo Sigo Aquí" (Berger & Bosh Mix) – 7:58
4. "I'll Be Right Here (Sexual Lover)" (Video) – 3:58
- UK CD 10th anniversary Almighty Records
1. "Sexual Lover" (Almighty Radio Edit) – 3:25
2. "Sexual Lover" (Almighty Club Mix) – 7:27
3. "Sexual Lover" (Almighty Radio Edit 2) – 3:25
4. "Sexual Lover" (Almighty Club Mix) – 7:27

=== Charts ===
Chart (2003)	Peak position
Czech Republic (IFPI)	49

=== Release history ===
Country	Date	Format	Label
United States	June 26, 2001	Contemporary hit radio	Universal
United States	March, 2003	Rhythmic radio	Universal
