= Estéfano =

Colombian musician

Fabio Alonso Salgado, better known as Estéfano (born 19 August 1966) is a Colombian musician, songwriter and record producer. Along with Donato Poveda formed the duo Donato y Estefano, releasing three studio albums through 1995–1999. After the duo disbanded he went on to pursue a solo career with his album Código Personal: A Media Vida released in 2005.

Estéfano has worked with Ricky Martin, Julio Iglesias, Jennifer Lopez, Marc Anthony, Shakira, Malú, Alexandre Pires, Enrique Iglesias, Gloria Estefan, Jon Secada, Paulina Rubio, Anahí, Noelia, Chayanne, Jerry Rivera and Thalía, among others.

== Background ==
Estéfano left his home in Manizales, Colombia for the United States in 1989, arriving as an aspiring songwriter. He signed his first publishing deal in 1992 with Foreign Imported Productions, a Miami-based company owned by Emilio Estefan Jr. His songwriting debut came later that year on Jon Secada's Otro Día Más Sin Verte, namely the number one hits "Cree en Nuestro Amor" and "Sentir." A year later he penned songs for Estefan's wife, Gloria, writing the bulk of her Grammy Award winner Mi Tierra, including a pair of number one singles on the Billboard Hot Latin Tracks chart: the title track and "Mi Buen Amor"

Following this remarkable success right out of the gate, Estéfano teamed with Cuban singer-songwriter Donato Póveda for a pair of albums and a couple of hits for Sony Discos, released as Donato & Estéfano. But the duo broke up soon thereafter, and Estéfano returned to his hitmaking ways as a songwriter and now as a producer also. First came some work for Chayanne, who hadn't recorded an original album in years and the result was "Dejaría Todo", Chayanne's first number one single in over six years. Estéfano continued to write more chart-toppers for him in the years to come. Two other Latin pop artists who greatly benefited from Estéfano's work around this time were Paulina Rubio with her best selling album ever, Paulina, and Thalía with her number-one album on the Billboard Top Latin Albums chart, Thalía.

In 2005, by which time he had been awarded BMI's Latin Songwriter of the Year honor (7) seven times and scored 39 Top 40, 22 Top Ten, and seven number one hits, Estéfano made his solo debut with Código Personal: A Media Vida, a collection of especially personal songs that he'd written for himself to sing. However, this album was not as successful as his previous work for other artists.

For his work on Amar Sin Mentiras by Marc Anthony, the producer won a Grammy Award.

== Discography ==
=== With Donato & Estéfano ===
- Mar Adentro (1995)
- Entre la Línea del Bien y la Línea del Mal (1997)
- De Hombre a Mujer (1999)
- Lo Mejor de Donato & Estéfano (2000)

=== As a solo artist ===
- Código Personal: A Media Vida (2005)
