= Steel Rain (album) =

Studio album by Jay Perez
- Released: September 1994
- Studio: Scruggs Sound (Berry Hill, Tennessee)
- Genre: Tejano; Traditional Mexican
- Length: 33:29
- Language: Spanish
- Label: Sony Discos
- Producer: Wyatt Esterling

Jay Perez chronology
Te Llevo En Mi (1993)	Steel Rain (1994)	The Voice (1995)

Steel Rain is the second studio album by American Tejano music singer Jay Perez. The album peaked at number five on the US Billboard Regional Mexican Albums chart. It garnered Perez a nomination for the Tejano Music Award for Male Entertainer of the Year and Male Vocalist of the Year at the 1995 Tejano Music Awards. The title track was nominated for the Tejano Country Single of the Year. One of the songs on the album, "Corazon", is a cover version of Carole King's song with the same title taken from her album Fantasy (1973).

== Track listing ==
Credits adapted from the liner notes of Steel Rain.

No.	Title	Writer(s)	Length
1.	"Ven a Mi"	Jay Perez	3:34
2.	"Cariñito de Mi Vida"	Héctor Escamilla	3:10
3.	"You Wouldn't Be Gone"	Russ Ballard, Al Spooner	3:32
4.	"Son Tus Miradas"	Perez	2:55
5.	"Corazon"	Carole King	3:08
6.	"Ya Basta"	Jay Perez	3:15
7.	"Nobody Told My Heart"	Wyatt Easterling	3:11
8.	"Amar Asi"	Jay Perez	3:05
9.	"Si Te Portas Mal"		3:34
10.	"Steel Rain"	Kye Fleming	4:05
Total length:			33:29

== Charts ==
Chart (1994)	Peak position
US Top Latin Albums	12
US Regional Mexican Albums	5

== See also ==
- 1994 in Latin music
- Latin American music in the United States
