= The Voice (Jay Perez album) =

Studio album by Jay Perez
- Released: October 24, 1995
- Studio: Q-Zone Studios (Corpus Christi, Texas)
- Genre: Tejano; Traditional Mexican
- Length: 37:09
- Language: Spanish
- Label: Sony Discos
- Producer: Jay Perez, Jerry de la Rosa

Jay Perez chronology
Steel Rain (1994)	The Voice (1995)	No Limits (1996)

The Voice is the third studio album by American Tejano music singer Jay Perez. The album peaked at number seven on the US Billboard Regional Mexican Albums chart. It garnered Perez a nomination for Album of the Year (Orchestra) at the 1996 Tejano Music Awards. Perez recorded "Let's Get it On", originally recorded by Marvin Gaye.

== Track listing ==
Credits adapted from the liner notes of The Voice.

No.	Title	Writer(s)	Length
1.	"Lo Que Yo Tengo"	Jay Perez	3:28
2.	"Hoy Soy Feliz"	Joe Carmona	3:18
3.	"Loco Por Tu Amor"	Vicente Barrera	2:54
4.	"Don't It Break Your Heart"	Mack David, Archie Jordan	2:51
5.	"Es Mi Amor"	Carmona	3:09
6.	"Let's Get It On"	Marvin Gaye, Ed Townsend	3:34
7.	"Cuando La Vea"	Barrera, Alfred Castanadea III	3:23
8.	"Mi Anhelo"	Joe Revelez	2:51
9.	"Ya No Te Extrano"	Jerry de la Rosa	3:20
10.	"Mi Ultimo Adios"	Revelez	3:52
11.	"Squeeze Box Man"	Johnny Salazar	2:58
12.	"Happy Birthday"	Jay Perez, Jerry de la Rosa	1:30
Total length:			37:08

== Charts ==
Chart (1995)	Peak position
US Top Latin Albums	15
US Regional Mexican Albums	7

== See also ==
- 1995 in Latin music
- Latin American music in the United States

== Works cited ==
- Lannert, John (November 25, 1995). "Latin Notas". Billboard. Vol. 107, no. 47.
- "Tejano Nominees Announced". Corpus Christi Caller-Times. February 24, 1996 – via Newspapers.com.
- Perez, Jay (1995). The Voice (Compact disc). Corpus Christi, Texas: Sony Discos.
