= Un Amigo Tendras =

Studio album by Jay Perez
- Released: April 15, 2016
- Genre: Tejano; Traditional Mexican
- Length: 49:15
- Language: Spanish
- Label: Freddie Records

Jay Perez chronology
Anthology — Back in the Day (2013)	Un Amigo Tendras (2016)	Joe Lopez vs. Jay Perez: Battle of the Voices (2016)

Un Amigo Tendras (You Will Have a Friend) is the seventeenth studio album by American Tejano music singer Jay Perez. It is the first album by Perez since New Horizons (2012). Un Amigo Tendras peaked at number 15 on the US Billboard Top Latin Albums chart. The album was nominated for Tejano Album of the Year at the 2016 Latin Grammy Awards. Un Amigo Tendras won Tejano Album of the Year at the 2017 Tejano Music Awards, while the title track won Song of the Year.

== Track listing ==
Credits adapted from the liner notes of Un Amigo Tendras.

No.	Title	Length
1.	"Cuentale en Mi"	3:52
2.	"Un Amigo Tendras"	4:49
3.	"He Venido a Decirte"	3:36
4.	"Quiero Amarte"	3:45
5.	"Hasta El Fin del Tiempo"	4:04
6.	"No Se Me Olvidan"	4:42
7.	"La Ultima Vez (Vuelves a Ser Mia)"	4:08
8.	"El Adios es Asi"	4:23
9.	"Me Sigo Acordando"	3:46
10.	"You Shouldn't Kiss Me Like This"	3:38
11.	"Ya No Puedo Verte"	4:48
12.	"Tu Fiel Amante"	3:38
Total length:		49:15

== Charts ==
Chart (2016)	Peak position
US Top Latin Albums (Billboard)	15
US Regional Mexican Albums (Billboard)	11

== See also ==
- 2016 in Latin music
- Latin American music in the United States

== Works cited ==
- Hackleman, Esther (September 22, 2016). "Corpus Christi Artist Nominated". Corpus Christi Caller-Times – via Newspapers.com.
- "Past Tejano Music Award Winners". TMAs.com. Archived from the original on 27 June 2015.
- "Top Latin Albums > May 13, 2016a". Billboard.
- "Regional Mexican Albums > May 7, 2016b". Billboard.
- Perez, Jay (2016). Un Amigo Tendras (Compact disc). San Antonio, Texas.
