= No Limits (Jay Perez album) =

Studio album by Jay Perez
- Released: December 10, 1996
- Studio: Gilberts Studio (San Antonio, Texas)
- Genre: Tejano; Traditional Mexican
- Length: 45:53
- Language: Spanish
- Label: Sony Discos
- Producer: Chente Barrera, Gilbert Velasquez

Jay Perez chronology
| The Voice (1995) | No Limits (1996) | Toda Mi Vida (1998) |

No Limits is the fourth studio album by American Tejano music singer Jay Perez. The album peaked at number seven on the US Billboard Regional Mexican Albums chart. "Una Vez Mas" received a nomination for Song of the Year at the 1998 Pura Vida Music Awards.

== Track listing ==
Credits adapted from the liner notes of No Limits.

| No. | Title | Writer(s) | Length |
|---|---|---|---|
| 1. | "Una Vez Mas" | Joe Revelez | 3:51 |
| 2. | "Esos Ojitos" | Vicente Barrera | 3:32 |
| 3. | "Si Tu No Estas" | | 4:19 |
| 4. | "Si Tu Ya Tienes Alguien" | Jerry de la Rosa | 3:15 |
| 5. | "Quiero" | Barrera | 3:15 |
| 6. | "Me and Mrs. Jones" | Kenny Gamble, Cary Gilbert, Leon Huff | 5:08 |
| 7. | "Que Bonito Es" | Revelez | 3:22 |
| 8. | "Ojitos Dormilones" | Humberto Ramon | 3:26 |
| 9. | "Eres Tu" | Barrera | 3:48 |
| 10. | "Ya No" | Jay Perez, Barrera | 3:53 |
| 11. | "Pero Ya No Voy a Llorar" | Ramon | 3:36 |
| 12. | "The Day God Cried" | Mike Moroff Burciaga | 4:28 |
| Total length: | | | 45:53 |

== Charts ==
| Chart (1996) | Peak position |
|---|---|
| US Top Latin Albums (Billboard) | 26 |
| US Regional Mexican Albums (Billboard) | 7 |

== See also ==
- 1996 in Latin music
- Latin American music in the United States

== Works cited ==
- Billingsley, Sandra R. (January 26, 1998). "Award Show to Honor Tejano Artists". San Angelo Standard-Times – via Newspapers.com.
- "Top Latin Albums > December 27, 1996". Billboard. Archived from the original on June 18, 2022.
- "Regional Mexican Albums > December 27, 1996". Billboard. Archived from the original on June 18, 2022.
- Perez, Jay (1996). No Limits (Compact disc). San Antonio, Texas: Sony Discos.
