= Mi Estrella =

Studio album by Jay Perez
- Released: May 30, 2000
- Studio: Blue Cat Studios (San Antonio, Texas)
- Genre: Tejano; Traditional Mexican
- Length: 40:36
- Language: Spanish
- Label: Sony Discos
- Producer: Jay Perez, Jerry de la Rosa

Jay Perez chronology
| Always & Forever (2000) | Mi Estrella (2000) | De Mi Cora-Soul (2001) |

Mi Estrella (My Star) is the eighth studio album by American Tejano music singer Jay Perez. The album peaked at number 13 on the US Billboard Regional Mexican Albums chart. The song "Señorita Tequila" received a nomination for Crossover Song of the Year at the 2001 Tejano Music Awards, while the album garnered Perez his first win for the Tejano Music Award for Male Vocalist of the Year after being nominated for five years.

== Track listing ==
Credits adapted from the liner notes of Mi Estrella.

| No. | Title | Writer(s) | Length |
|---|---|---|---|
| 1. | "No Quiero Saber Se Ti" | Art Guillermo | 2:58 |
| 2. | "No Digas Mas" | Beto Ramon | 3:11 |
| 3. | "Nunca En Mi Vida" | | 3:02 |
| 4. | "Señorita Tequila" | | 4:17 |
| 5. | "Mi Estrella" | Jay Perez, Andrew Sanchez | 3:40 |
| 6. | "Vuelve Comigo" | Perez | 3:13 |
| 7. | "El Amor Se Acaba" | Jerry de la Rosa | 3:34 |
| 8. | "Amame" | Perez, De la Rosa | 3:00 |
| 9. | "Vete Con El" | De la Rosa | 3:14 |
| 10. | "Love Won't Let Me Wait" | Vinnie Barrett, Bobby Eli | 4:09 |
| 11. | "Cuando" | Perez | 3:17 |
| 12. | "Mala Mujer" | Chente Barrera | 3:01 |
| Total length: | | | 40:36 |

== Charts ==
| Chart (2000) | Peak position |
|---|---|
| US Top Latin Albums (Billboard) | 38 |
| US Regional Mexican Albums (Billboard) | 13 |

== See also ==
- 2000 in Latin music
- Latin American music in the United States

== Works cited ==
- "Los Garcia Wins Big at Tejano Awards". Abilene News-Reporter. April 8, 2001 – via Newspapers.com.
- Rodriguez, Helena (March 20, 2001). "Tejano Music Award Finalists May Take Genre in New Direction". Abilene News-Reporter – via Newspapers.com.
- "Top Latin Albums > June 24, 2000". Billboard. Archived from the original on June 19, 2022.
- "Regional Mexican Albums > June 24, 2000". Billboard. Archived from the original on June 19, 2022.
- Perez, Jay (2000). Mi Estrella (Compact disc). San Antonio, Texas: Sony Discos.
