= Toda Mi Vida =

Studio album by Jay Perez
- Released: February 3, 1998
- Genre: Tejano; traditional Mexican
- Length: 52:31
- Language: Spanish
- Label: Sony Discos
- Producer: Jerry de la Rosa

Jay Perez chronology
| No Limits (1996) | Toda Mi Vida (1998) | Siempre Contigo (1999) |

Toda Mi Vida (All My Life) is the fifth studio album by American Tejano music singer Jay Pérez. The album peaked at number eight on the US Billboard Regional Mexican Albums chart. The album received a nomination for Album of the Year (Group) at the 1999 Tejano Music Awards.

== Track listing ==
Credits adapted from the liner notes of Toda Mi Vida.

| No. | Title | Writer(s) | Length |
|---|---|---|---|
| 1. | "Dame Tu Corazón" | Jay Pérez | 3:43 |
| 2. | "Si Tú Te Vas" | | 3:41 |
| 3. | "Hombres Y Mujeres" | Jay Pérez, Vicente Barrera | 3:17 |
| 4. | "Mi Unica Ilusión" | | 3:19 |
| 5. | "¿Por Qué Te Fuiste?" | | 3:47 |
| 6. | "Lo Que Es Querer" | | 3:37 |
| 7. | "Solo Contigo" | | 3:42 |
| 8. | "Toda Mi Vida" | Jay Pérez | 3:24 |
| 9. | "Si Quieres" | | 3:31 |
| 10. | "Let's Stay Together" | | 4:46 |
| Total length: | | | 52:31 |

== Charts ==
| Chart (1998) | Peak position |
|---|---|
| US Top Latin Albums (Billboard) | 26 |
| US Regional Mexican Albums (Billboard) | 8 |

== See also ==
- 1998 in Latin music
- Latin American music in the United States

== Works cited ==
- Cabrera, Rene (January 22, 1999). "Tejano Award Nominees". Corpus Christi Caller-Times – via Newspapers.com.
- Lannert, John (July 18, 1998). "Latin Notas > Top Latin Albums". Billboard. Vol. 110, no. 29.
- Pérez, Jay (1998). Toda Mi Vida (Compact disc). San Antonio, Texas: Sony Discos.
