= Te Llevo en Mi =

Studio album by Jay Perez
- Released: June 15, 1993
- Venue: Zaz Recordings (San Antonio, Texas)
- Genre: Tejano; Traditional Mexican
- Length: 33:32
- Language: Spanish
- Label: Sony Discos
- Producer: Luis Silva

Jay Perez chronology
Te Llevo en Mi (1993)	Steel Rain (1994)

Te Llevo en Mi (English: I Carry You in Me) is the debut studio album by American Tejano music singer Jay Perez. The album peaked at number ten on the US Billboard Regional Mexican Albums chart. It garnered Perez the Billboard Latin Music Awards for New Regional Mexican Artist in 1994, as well as a nomination for the Tejano Music Award for Male Entertainer of the Year at the 1994 Tejano Music Awards. His English-language effort "On This Side of the Door" was nominated for the Tejano Country Single of the Year.

== Track listing ==
Credits adapted from the liner notes of Te Llevo en Mi.

No.	Title	Writer(s)	Length
1.	"Yo Tengo Un Amor"	Rene Orenales	2:52
2.	"Cuando Yo Te Amaba Tanto"	Chente Barrera	2:54
3.	"Tengo Que Verte"	Roger Contreras	3:07
4.	"On This Side of the Door"	Kerry Kurt Phillips, Andy Spooner, Michael Higgins	3:53
5.	"Necesito Yo Saber"	Jay Perez	3:28
6.	"Ella Es"	Juan Gomez	3:08
7.	"Si Tu Regresas"	Héctor Escamilla	3:20
8.	"Quiero Tu Amor"	Dimas Garcia	3:40
9.	"Me He Dado Cuenta"	Luis Silva	4:19
10.	"Por Ultima Vez"	Joe Revelez	2:51
Total length:			33:32

== Chart performance ==
=== Weekly charts ===
Chart (1993)	Peak position
US Top Latin Albums	23
US Regional Mexican Albums	10

=== Year-end charts ===
Chart (1993)	Position
US Regional Mexican Albums	16

== See also ==
- 1993 in Latin music
- Latin American music in the United States
