= Jay Pérez =

American Tejano musician

- Born: Jesse Pérez Jr. September 21, 1963 (age 62); San Antonio, Texas, US
- Genres: Tejano, regional Mexican, Latin pop
- Occupations: Singer-songwriter; musician; drummer
- Instruments: Vocals; drums
- Years active: 1987–present
- Label: Freddie Records
- Member of: Jay Pérez and the Band
- Formerly of: Latin Breed; David Lee Garza y los Musicales
- Spouse: Roxane Pérez (m. 2014)

Jay Pérez (born in San Antonio, Texas. September 21, 1963) is an American Tejano musician, who is known for mixing rhythm and blues with traditional Tejano Music, Regional Mexican and Latin pop.

== Career ==
Pérez was born in San Antonio, Texas on September 21, 1963. He attended John Jay High School but dropped out during his junior year to work and provide for his brother and sister. Initially a drummer for the Mysterio Band with Albert Castañeda, he then became a lead vocalist for the groups Latin Breed and David Lee Garza y los Musicales. Pérez began a solo career in the early 1990s, and has released several albums.

He has won several Tejano Music Awards, including Male Vocalist of the Year in 2000, 2003, 2004, 2005, 2006, 2007, 2008, and 2010, Entertainer of the Year in 2008, and Male Vocalist of the Decade Award (2000–2010) for 2010. He was also nominated for Song of the Year for "Nada" (with Gabriel Zavala and Joel Rosario) at the 2025 Tejano Music Awards.

== Discography ==
- Breakin' The Rules (1989) – with The Latin Breed
- Con el Tiempo with (1991) – with David Lee Garza y los Musicales
- 13/92 (1992) – with David Lee Garza y los Musicales
- Te Llevo en Mi (1993)
- Steel Rain (1994)
- The Voice (1995)
- No Limits (1996)
- Toda Mi Vida (1998)
- Siempre Contigo (1999)
- Mi Estrella (2000)
- Always & Forever (2000)
- De Mi Cora-Soul (2001)
- Hombre en la Luna (2002)
- Mi Destino (2003)
- Jay Pérez Christmas (2004)
- Live in Concert (2005)
- All of Me (2006)
- La Voz del 2008 (2007)
- All The Way Live (2009)
- The Voice Of Authority (2011)
- New Horizons (2012)
- Anthology: Back in the Day (2013)
- Un Amigo Tendras (2016)
- 25th Anniversary: Contigo (2019)
- El Maestro (2021)
- El Patron (2023)
- Le Seguiremos (2025)

== DVD ==
Jay Pérez Up Close and Personal (2005)
