= Latin American music in the United States =

Latin American music in the United States encompasses musical traditions originating from Spanish, Portuguese, and occasionally French-speaking countries and territories of Latin America, as well as the distinctive styles that have developed within Latino communities in the United States. Latin American musical traditions have significantly influenced the development of American popular music since the early 20th century, shaping genres including jazz, rhythm and blues, and country music. This cross-cultural exchange has resulted in the emergence of hybrid styles unique to the United States, such as salsa, New Mexico music, Tejano, and Western music. Additionally, fusion genres including Chicano rock, Nuyorican rap, and Chicano rap have developed within Latin American diaspora communities, reflecting their cultural identities and experiences.

The U.S. music industry defines "Latin music" as any musical release with lyrics predominantly in Spanish, regardless of the artist's origin or the music's geographic source, a broader definition than the geographic and cultural understanding of Latin American music. Since the early 21st century, Latin music has experienced substantial commercial growth in the United States, facilitated by streaming platforms, recorded music sales, and live performance revenues. According to the Recording Industry Association of America (RIAA), Latin music revenue grew approximately 24 percent in 2022 compared to 2021, significantly exceeding the overall recording industry growth rate of 6 percent for the same period. By 2022, Latin music represented nearly 7 percent of the total U.S. recorded music market, an increase from approximately 6 percent the previous year, reflecting both expanding domestic audiences within Latino communities and increasing mainstream crossover appeal.

== History ==
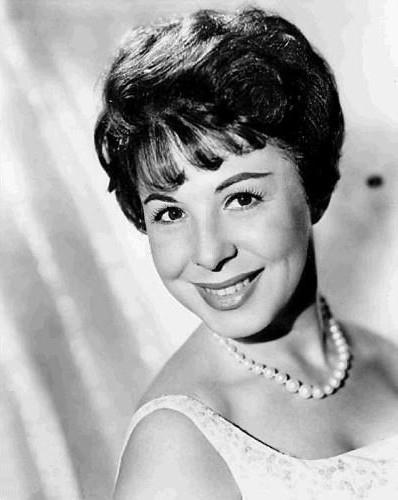
Eydie Gormé an American singer who had hits on the pop and Latin pop charts. Songs performed by Eydie Gormé include: "Sabor a Mí," "Amor," and "Cuando Vuelva a Tu Lado."

The term Latin music originated in the United States due to the increasing influence of Latino Americans in the American music market. Notable pioneers of this genre include Xavier Cugat (1940s) and Tito Puente (1950s), and its popularity accelerated in later decades. As one author explained the rising popularity from the 1940s: "Latin America, the one part of the world not engulfed in World War II, became a favorite topic for songs and films for Americans who wanted momentarily to forget about the conflagration." Wartime propaganda for America's "Good Neighbor Policy" further enhanced the cultural impact. Pérez Prado, known as "The Mambo King," composed famous pieces like "Mambo No. 5" and "Mambo No. 8." At the height of the mambo movement in 1955, Pérez topped the American charts with a cha-cha-chá version of "Cherry Pink and Apple Blossom White." In the 1950s, Perez Prado popularized the mambo, and the Afro-Cuban jazz of Dizzy Gillespie introduced many to the harmonic, melodic, and rhythmic possibilities of Latin American music, which continues to influence the genre of salsa.

Artists like Carmen Miranda and Desi Arnaz were popular with audiences of all cultures. Judy Garland's first hit, as a member of the "Gumm Sisters," was "La Cucaracha."

Although Latin music's influence could be seen far before the 1940s. For example, in the bridge of "St. Louis Blues" (1914) with the lyrics "Saint Louis woman, with her diamond rings," a habanera beat is evident, leading Jelly Roll Morton to comment, 'You've got to have that Spanish tinge.' To capture this essence, many American bands have incorporated a conga player, maracas, or other Latin percussion instruments into their music.

The song Amapola (Pretty Little Poppy), written in 1920 by Spanish American composer José María Lacalle García (later known as Joseph Lacalle), featured original lyrics in Spanish. A recorded version made by the Jimmy Dorsey Orchestra with vocalists Helen O'Connell and Bob Eberly reached Billboard charts staying there for 14 weeks and eventually reaching #1

The Argentine tango was a worldwide success in the 1930s. Tango dancers and records could be found from Los Angeles to Beijing. It was common in dance halls in the late 1930s and 1940s for a Latin orchestra, such as that of Vincent López, to alternate with a big band because dancers insisted on it. Latin American music was extremely popular with dancers, encompassing not only the samba, pasodoble, rhumba, and mambo but also the conga, adapted for the ballroom.

During the 1940s, music from Latin America was introduced to larger audiences throughout the United States via international radio networks such as CBS. Programs like Viva America showcased leading musicians from both North and South America, featuring performances of Mexican boleros. These programs included collaborations by notable musicians, vocalists, and composers, including Alfredo Antonini, Juan Arvizu, Nestor Mesta Chayres, Eva Garza, Elsa Miranda, John Serry Sr., Miguel Sandoval, and Terig Tucci.

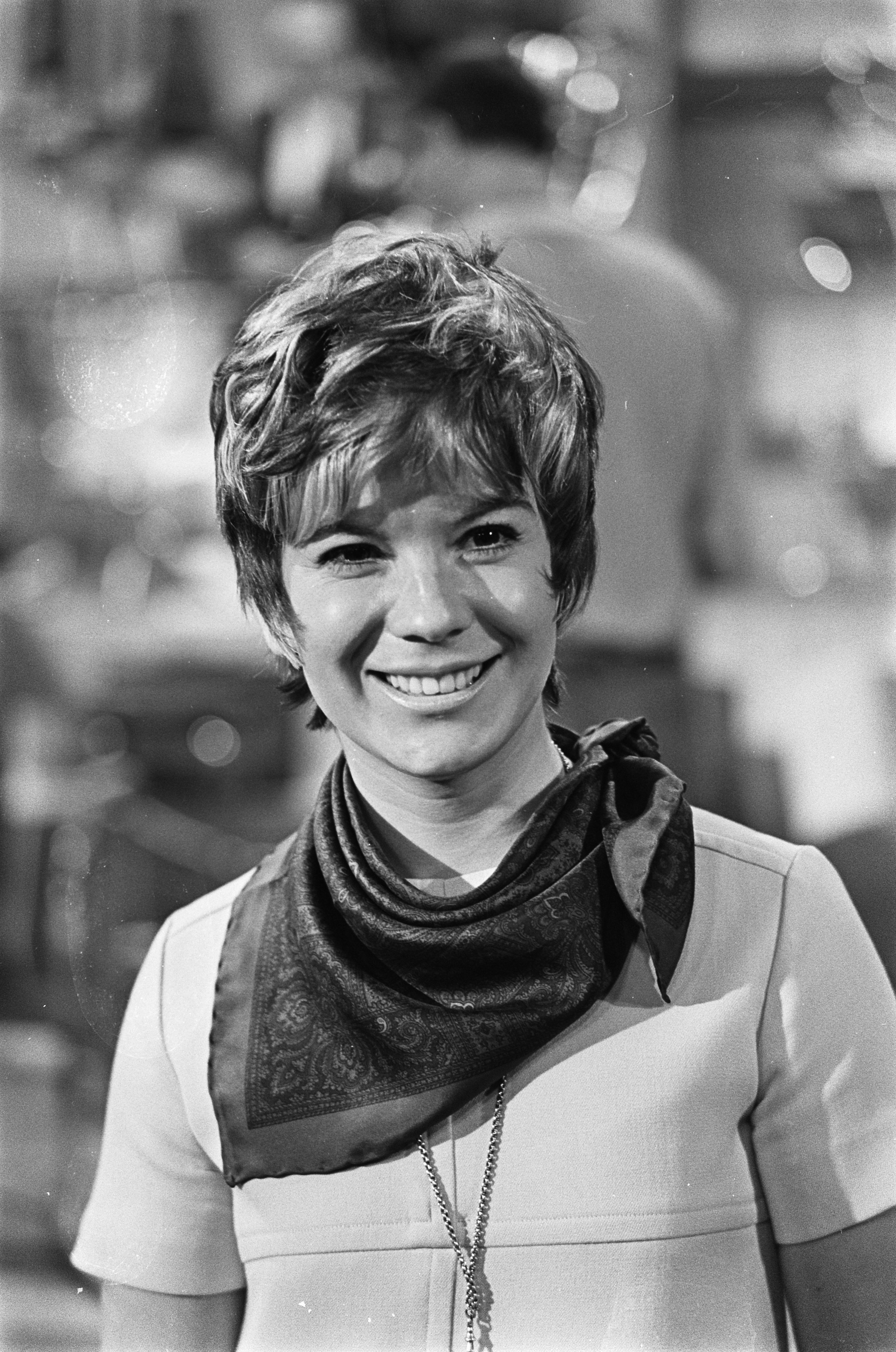
Vikki Carr most popular songs include "It Must Be Him," "With Pen in Hand," and "Can't Take My Eyes Off You." "It Must Be Him" was her biggest hit, reaching No. 3 on the Billboard Hot 100 chart in 1967.

Latin American music imported from Cuba (such as chachachá, mambo, and rhumba) and Mexico (including ranchera and mariachi) had brief periods of popularity during the 1950s. The earliest popular Latin American music in the United States came with the rhumba in the early 1930s, followed by calypso in the mid-1940s, mambo in the late 1940s and early 1950s, chachachá and charanga in the mid-1950s, bolero in the late 1950s, and finally boogaloo in the mid-1960s. During the same period, Latin American music mixed with jazz, resulting in Latin jazz and the fusion of cool jazz with bossa nova.

The first Mexican-Texan pop star was Lydia Mendoza, who started recording music in 1934. However, it wasn't until the 1940s that música norteña was popularized by female duets like Carmen y Laura and Las Hermanas Mendoza, who had a series of regional hits. The following decade witnessed the ascent of Chelo Silva, known as the "Queen of the (Mexican) Bolero," who sang romantic pop songs.

In the 1950s, further innovation took place in the Mexican-Texan community, with the addition of electric guitars, drums, and elements of rock and jazz to conjunto music. Valerio Longoria was the first major performer of conjunto, known for introducing Colombian cumbia and Mexican ranchera to conjunto bands. Later, Tony de la Rosa modernized conjunto big bands by adding electric guitars, an amplified bajo sexto, and a drum kit, while slowing down the frenetic dance rhythms of the style. In the mid-1950s, bandleader Isidro Lopez incorporated an accordion into his band, marking the beginning of the evolution of Tejano music. The rock-influenced Little Joe was the first major star of this scene.

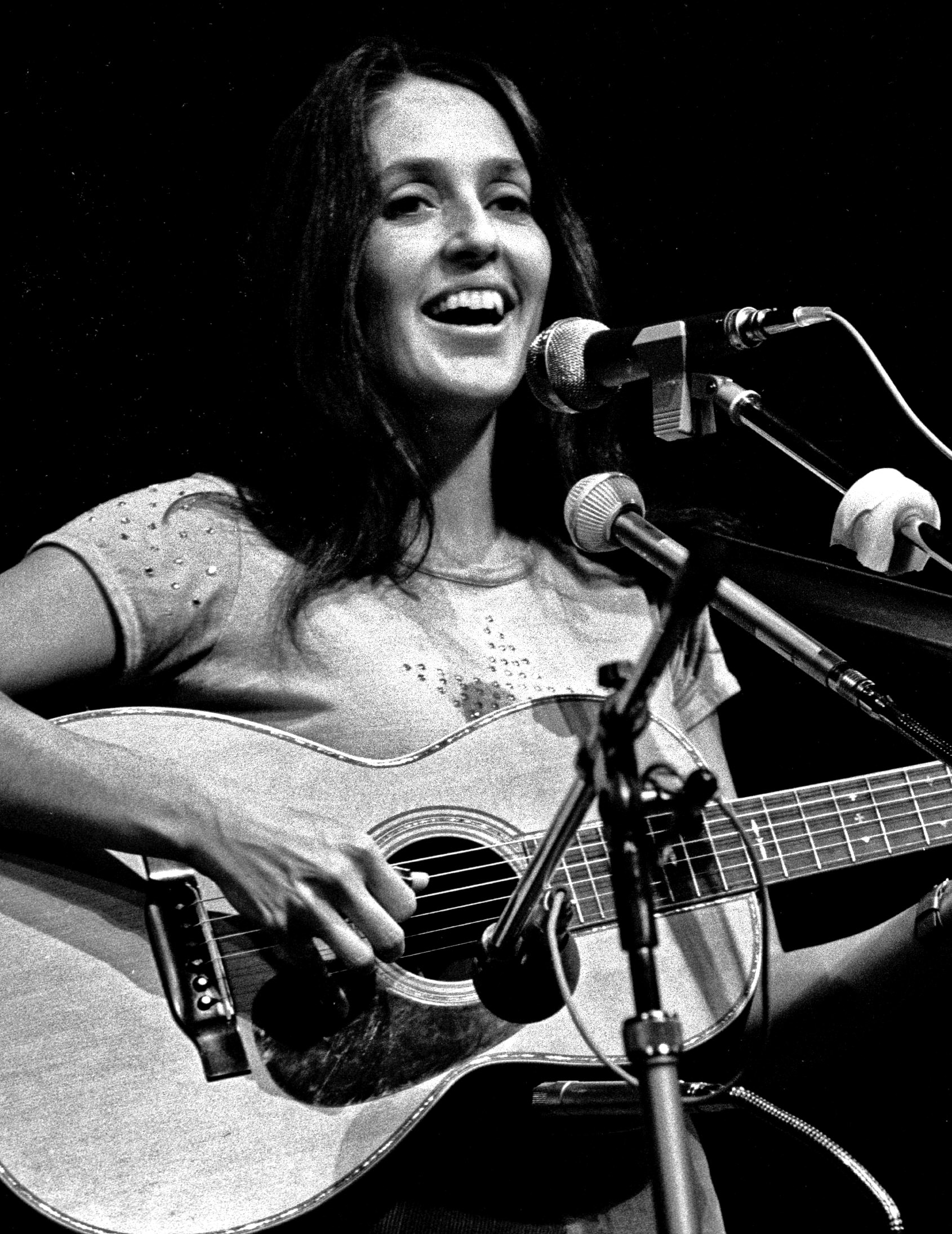
Joan Baez most famous songs include "Diamonds & Rust," "We Shall Overcome," and "The Night They Drove Old Dixie Down."

The "Spanish tinge" was also a common feature in rhythm and blues in the 1950s. The monster hit "Little Darling" was driven by the clave beat, and Chuck Berry's "Havana Moon" achieved great success. Ritchie Valens, born Ricardo Valenzuela, soared to the top of the hit parade with 'La Bamba,' originally a Mexican wedding song. In 1954, Andy Russell relocated to Mexico, where he became a star in radio, television, motion pictures, records, and nightclubs. The Argentinian band Los Cinco Latinos released their first album, "Maravilloso Maravilloso," which found success in Latin America and the United States.

In 1963, Trini Lopez burst onto the scene with his chart-topping album, "Trini Lopez at PJ's." While performing at a popular Los Angeles nightclub frequented by Hollywood stars, Frank Sinatra noticed Trini and signed him to his own record label, Reprise Records. Trini was the first rock act on Reprise Records, which later signed Jimi Hendrix.

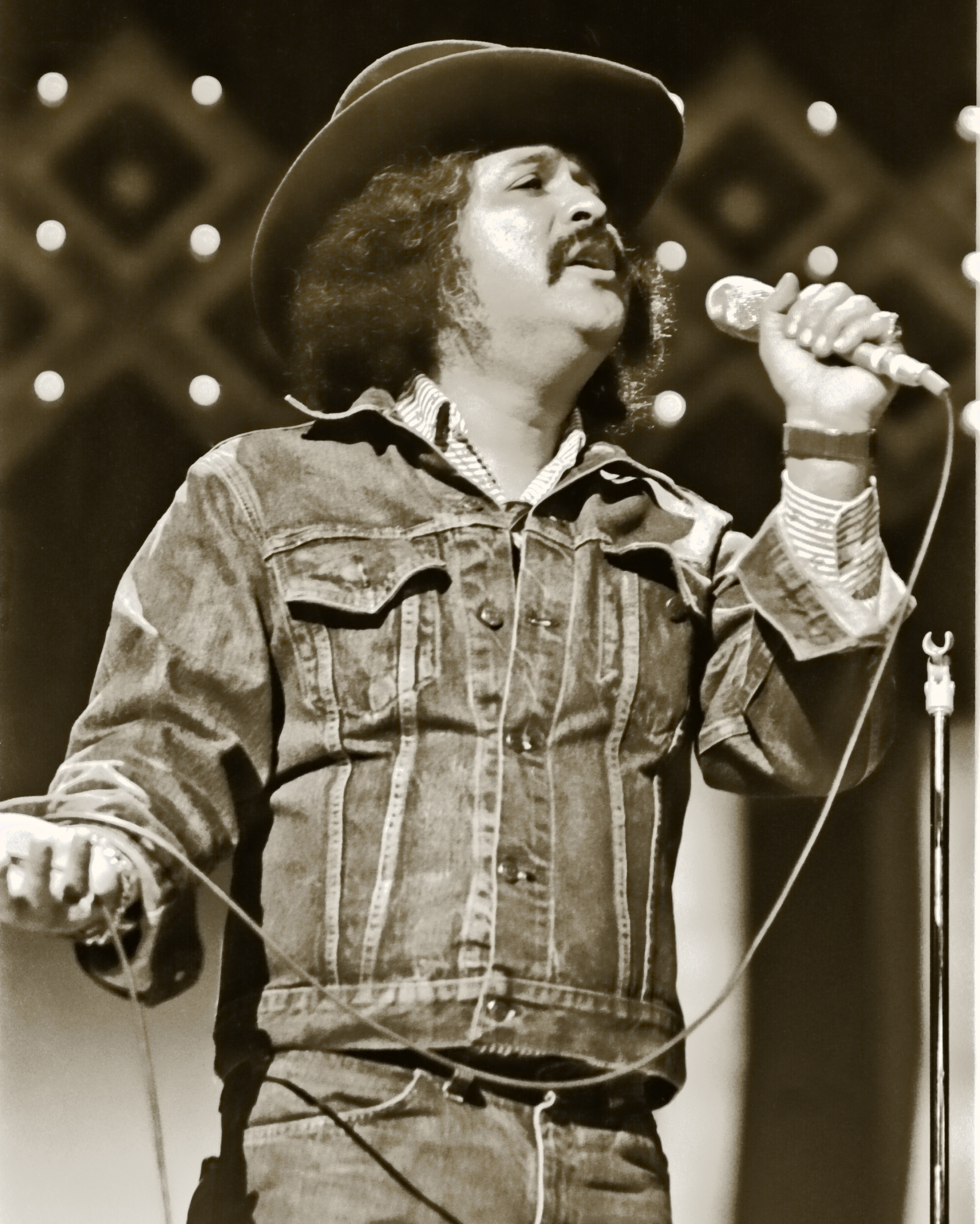
Freddy Fender gained recognition as a rock and roll artist with hits like "Wasted Days and Wasted Nights." He later transitioned into country music and had chart-topping country hits, including "Before the Next Teardrop Falls."

Trini Lopez, the son of immigrant Mexican parents, was born in Houston, Texas. He was chosen to replace Buddy Holly in the Crickets after Holly's tragic death. Growing up in a Mexican and Black neighborhood in Houston, his father bought him a guitar to keep him engaged in a hobby that wasn't associated with gangs. He began his career as a rockabilly artist in Texas.

After relocating to Los Angeles with the goal of meeting his idol, Frank Sinatra, he found himself at PJ's nightclub, where he played solo guitar and sang for a year and a half. He performed popular tunes during 4 or 5 sets every night. At the time, the folk music scene was thriving, and he incorporated well-known folk songs into his sets, along with rock standards ranging from Ray Charles to show tunes from "West Side Story." His infectious energy and ability to captivate an audience and get them in the party spirit were captured live on the two albums recorded at PJ's, with the addition of drums and bass guitar.

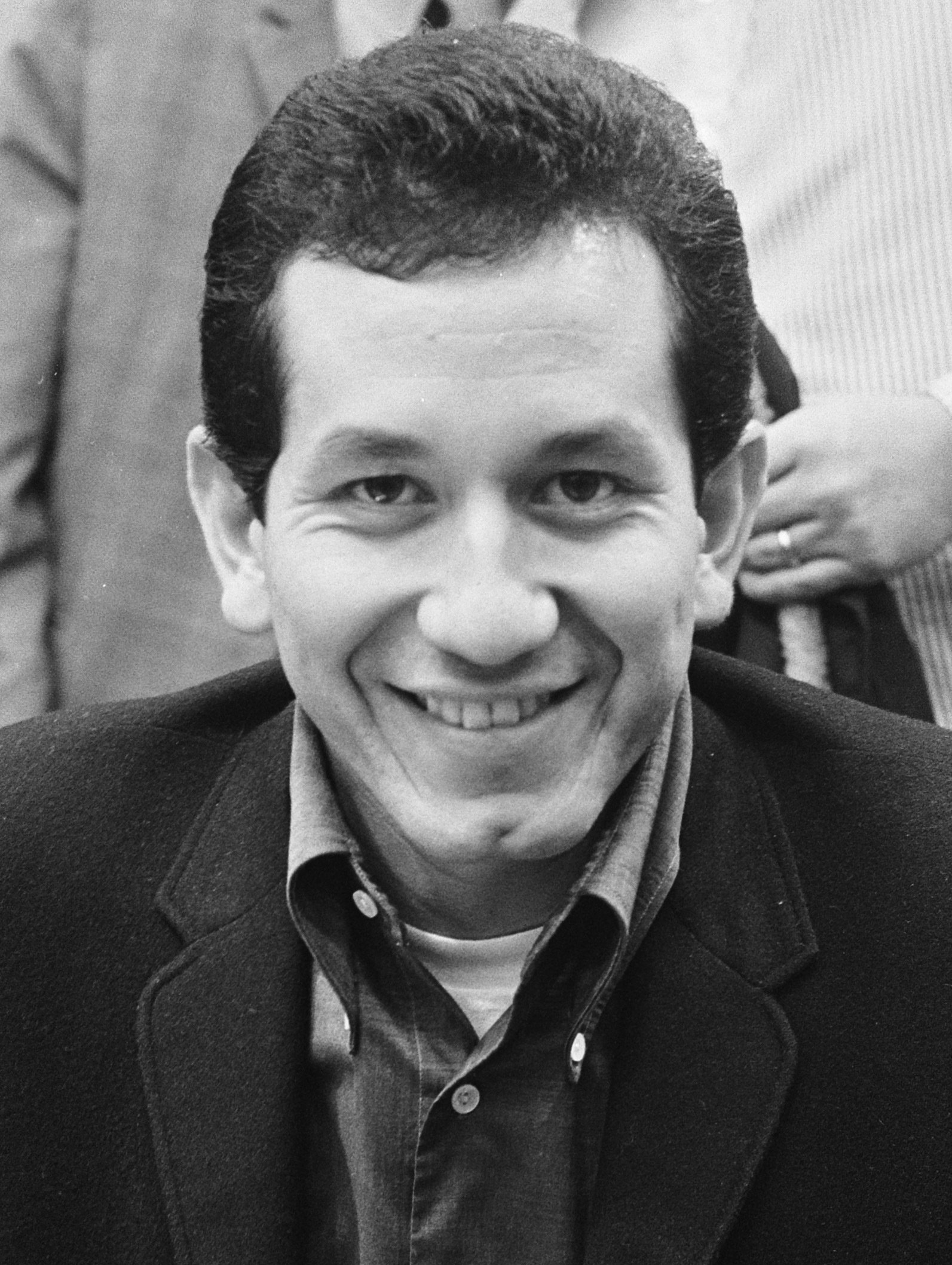
Trini Lopez a versatile singer and guitarist known for songs like "If I Had a Hammer" and "Lemon Tree".

The result was international stardom, marked by several folk-rock hits, including "Lemon Tree" and "If I Had a Hammer," along with a sensational remake of "La Bamba," all recorded live in front of the PJ's crowd. Trini Lopez not only pioneered the folk-rock genre but also paved the way for future generations of Latin stars by refusing to change his last name when early record executives doubted that a Lopez could make a name in the predominantly Anglo radio and TV world.

He later ventured into film acting and became associated with Frank Sinatra's Rat Pack. He was co-billed with the Beatles in Paris just two weeks before they made their iconic appearance on the Ed Sullivan Show.

Similarly, the Tex-Mex and Tejano styles incorporated the conjunto sound, giving rise to important music such as 'Tequila' by The Champs, "96 Tears" by Question Mark and the Mysterians, Sam the Sham & the Pharaohs, Thee Midniters, and the various groups led by Doug Sahm, including the Sir Douglas Quintet and the Texas Tornados. The Texas Tornados included Freddy Fender, who infused Latin soul into country music. Flaco Jiménez, a member of the Tornados, is a genuine conjunto hero, a third-generation accordionist whose grandfather learned the instrument from German settlers in Texas. Johnny Rodriguez is another Latin country star.

In the modern rock and roll era, Carlos Santana featured a full-blown Latin approach. Joe King Carrasco y las Coronas play punk rock in a Tex-Mex style.

Herman Santiago wrote the lyrics to the iconic rock and roll song "Why Do Fools Fall in Love." Another song that became popular in the United States, especially during the holiday season, is "Feliz Navidad" by José Feliciano.

=== 1980s crossover acts ===
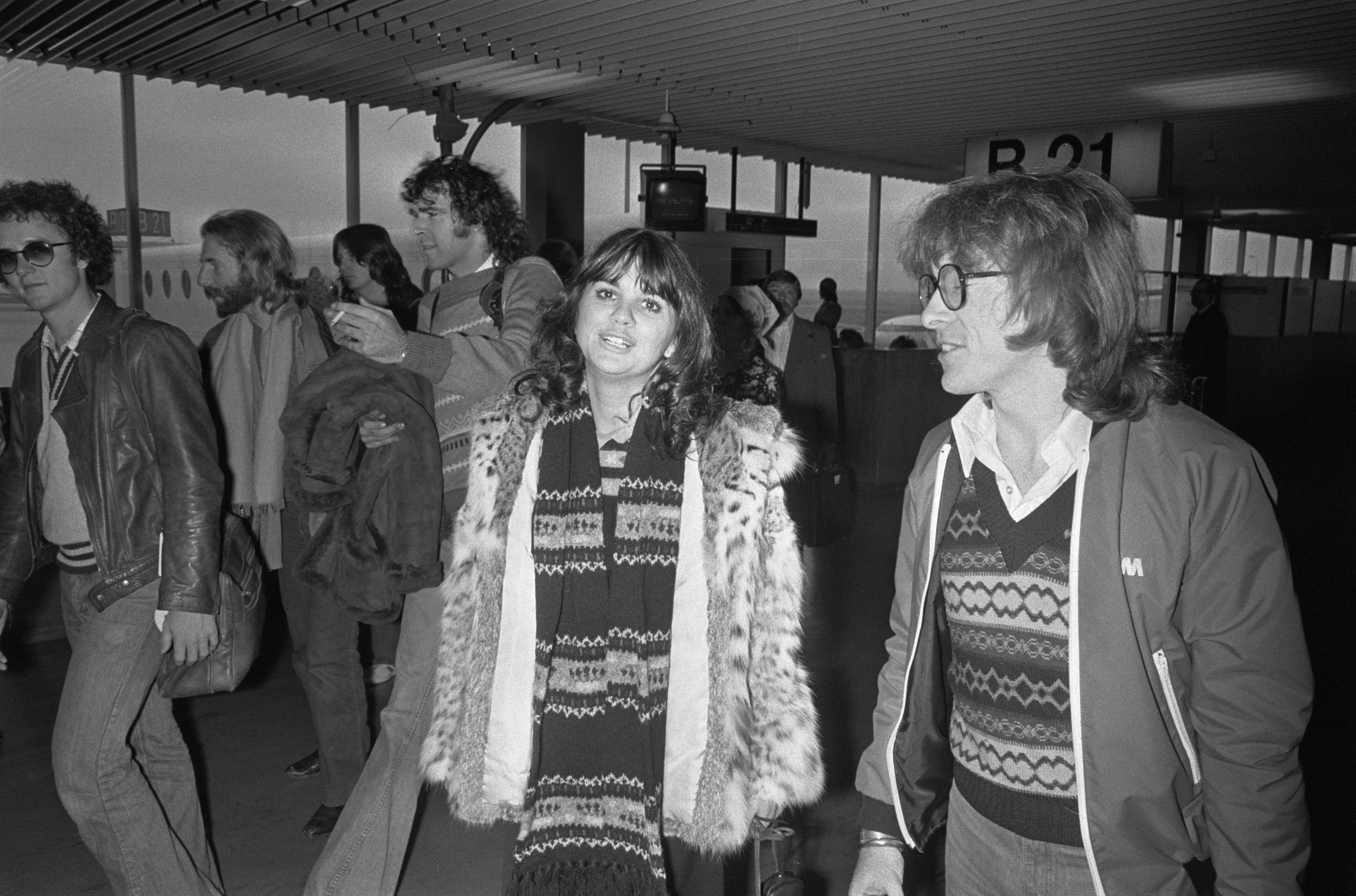
Linda Ronstadt in 1976

Starting in the mid-1980s, Billboard introduced the Top Latin Albums and Hot Latin Tracks charts for Latin music albums and singles. In 1980, Angélica María recorded for the first time in a U. K. studio, making an album of ballads and a single record with two pop songs in English, seeking some kind of crossover. Her singing career spans through 2013, being her most recent album "With Your Love", produced by R. Levaron, and launched by Universal Music. Jose Feliciano was the very first to become known as a "Crossover Artist" and, along with Gloria Estefan, is among the most successful crossover performers in Latin music to date. Puerto Rico's boy band Menudo had several Latin Hits and English songs including 1985's Hold Me #62 on Billboard Hot 100 and #61 on Billboard Hot R&B. Gloria began crossing over to English music in 1984. Estefan at the time was with the Miami Sound Machine. Their more successful follow-up album, Primitive Love, was released in 1985, launching three Top 10 hits on the Billboard Hot 100: "Conga" (U.S. #10), "Words Get in the Way" (U.S. #5), and "Bad Boy" (U.S. #8) became follow–up hits in the U.S. and around the world. "Words Get in the Way" reached No. 1 on the US Hot Adult Contemporary Tracks chart, establishing that the group could perform pop ballads as successfully as dance tunes. The song "Hot Summer Nights" was also released that year and was part of the blockbuster movie Top Gun. Since then Estefan has bridged between both the English and Latin world for the mid to late 1980s, 1990s and 2000s.

=== 1990s Latin explosion ===
In the mid-1990s, Selena was gaining prominence within the Latin American music world. Primarily marketed as a Tejano music artist, Selena's success was met with rhythmic Cumbia recordings. After bypassing several barriers within the Tejano industry, she quickly superseded other Latin artist acts and earned the title "Queen of Tejano Music". After being presented with a Grammy for Selena Live!, Selena became the first Latin artist to release four number–one singles in 1994. With a meteoric rise in popularity, Selena was presented with the opportunity to record an English-crossover album.

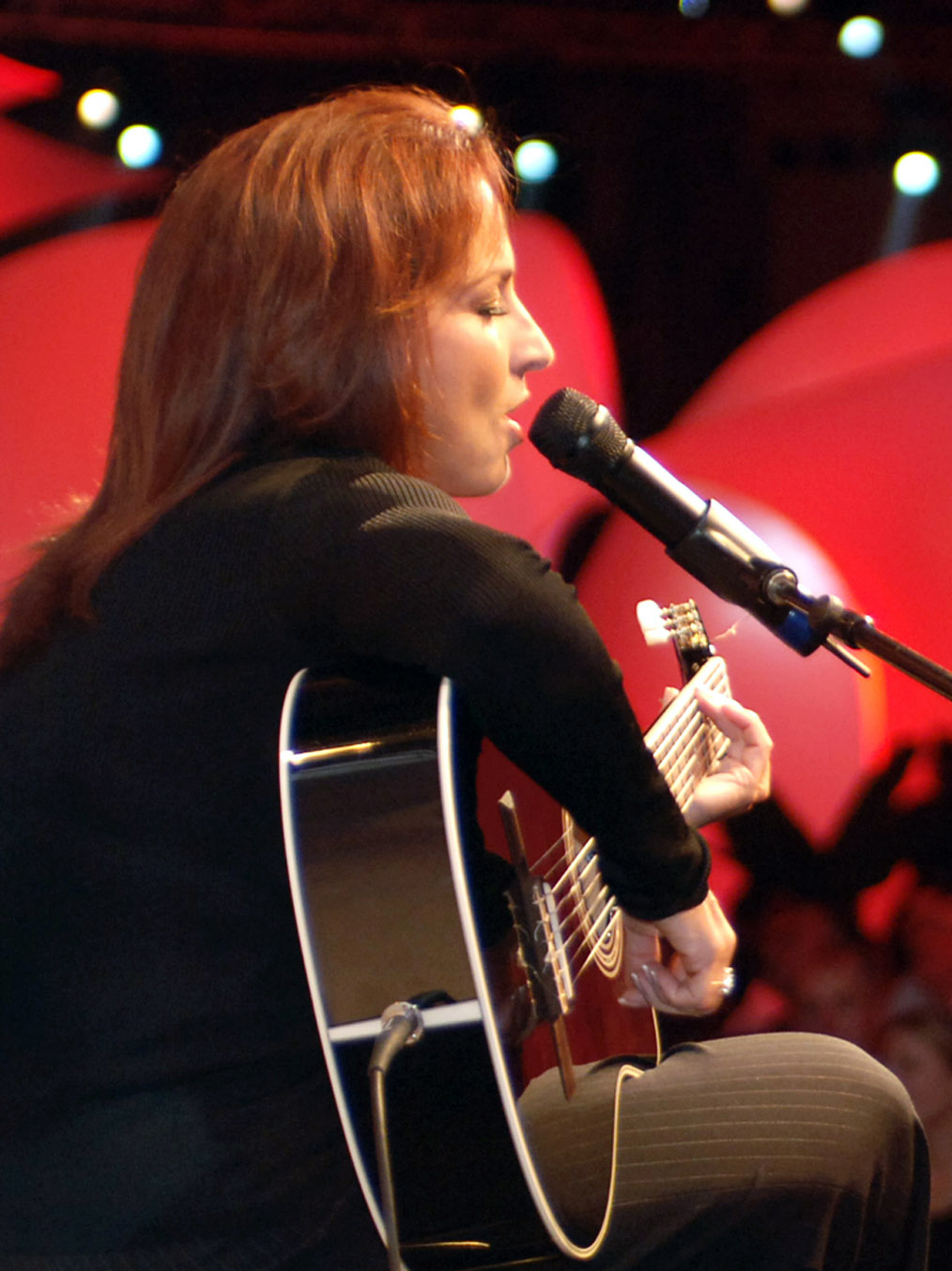
Gloria Estefan in 2016

Months before the release of her English album, Selena was murdered by her fan club president on March 31, 1995, in Corpus Christi, Texas. Selena's incomplete album, titled Dreaming of You, was released in July 1995, topping the Billboard 200. Selena's songs "Dreaming of You" and "I Could Fall In Love" quickly became mainstream hits, and the album became among the top ten best-selling debuts of all time along with being among the best-selling debuts for a female artist. Selena became the first Latin artist, male or female, to have ever debuted with a No. 1 album, partially in Spanish.

Despite, and perhaps fueled by, Selena's death and crossover success, the "Latin explosion" continued in the late 1990s. At that time, a handful of rising stars who shared a Latin heritage were touted as proof that sounds from Latin countries were infiltrating the pop mainstream. These included Ricky Martin, Shakira, Paulina Rubio, Marc Anthony, Enrique Iglesias and Jennifer Lopez, who rendered a Golden-Globe-nominated performance as Selena on film. Like Estefan and Selena, many of these artists, including some who recorded in English after gaining fame singing in Spanish, had been influenced at least as much by American music and culture.

In 1994, Frank Sinatra personally invited Luis Miguel to participate on a duet in the album Duets II. Luis Miguel has been dubbed several times by the press and the media as the "Latin Frank Sinatra". "Come Fly with Me" was the song of the duet with Luis Miguel.

Ricky Martin gained success with "La Copa de la Vida", which Martin made a major hit in an English version when he was chosen to sing the anthem of the 1998 FIFA World Cup. "The Cup of Life" reached number one on the charts in 60 countries and the English version became No. 45 on the Hot 100 charts. The song went Platinum in France, Sweden and in Australia, where it ultimately became the number one single of the year. The song was awarded "Pop Song of the Year" at the 1999 Lo Nuestro Awards.

Martin at the Grammy Awards was booked to sing on the show's live TV broadcast. The now-legendary performance of "The Cup of Life" stopped the show, earning Martin an unexpected standing ovation and introducing the star to the mainstream American audience. Martin capped off the evening by winning the award for Best Latin Pop Performance. Vuelve became Martin's first Top 40 album on Billboard Top 200 Albums chart in the U.S., where it was certified Platinum by the RIAA. The album notably went to No. 1 in Norway for three weeks, going on to sell eight million copies worldwide.

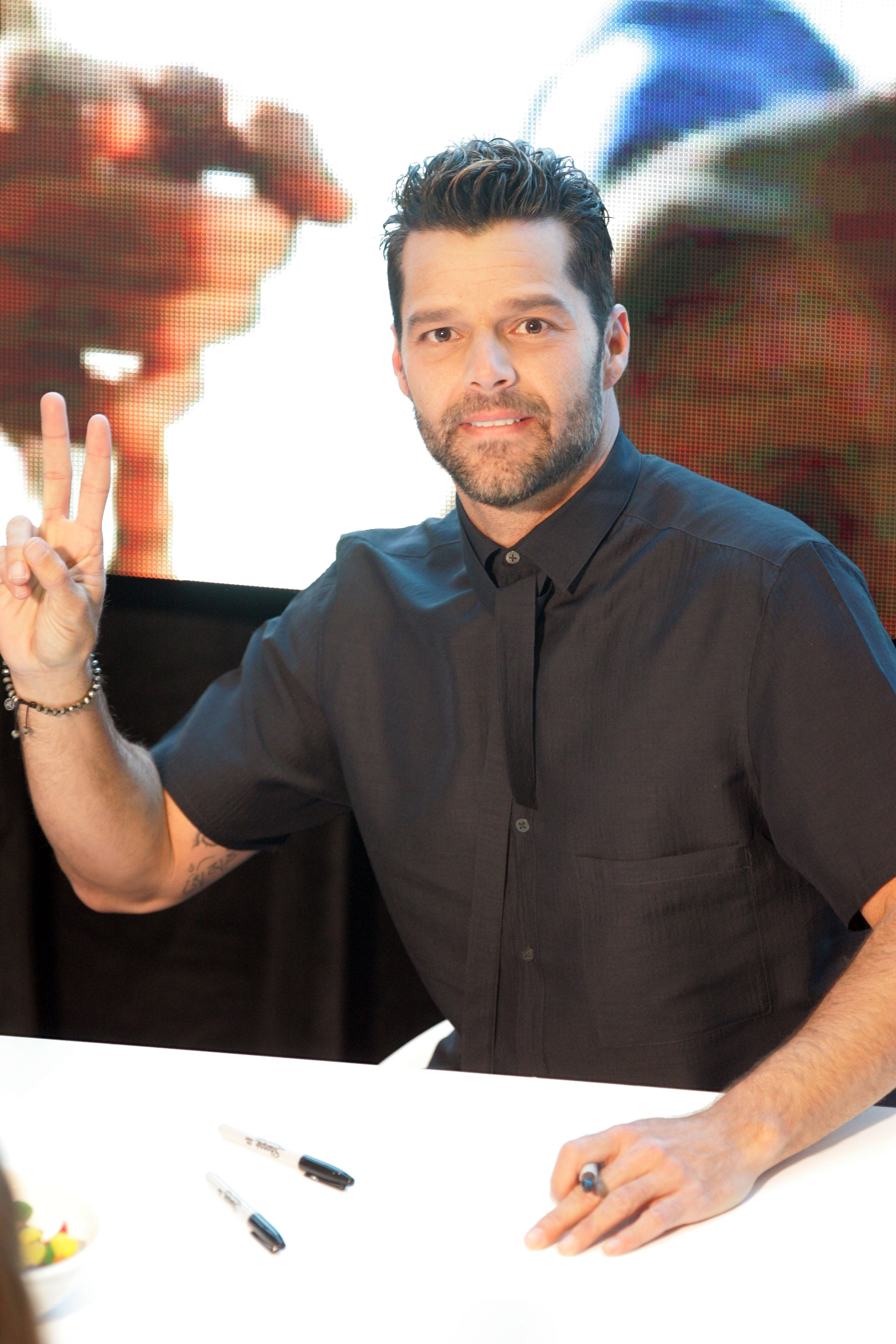
Ricky Martin

Martin prepared his first English album in 1999, as the first and most prominent single was "Livin' la Vida Loca", which reached number one in many countries around the world, including the United States, the United Kingdom, Argentina, Australia, Brazil, France, Greece, India, Israel, Italy, Japan, Guatemala, Mexico, Russia, Turkey, and South Africa. He followed up with the hit "She's All I Ever Had" which peaked at No. 2 on The Billboard Hot 100. This album became one of the top-selling albums of 1999, and was certified seven times platinum, selling over 22 million copies worldwide to date.

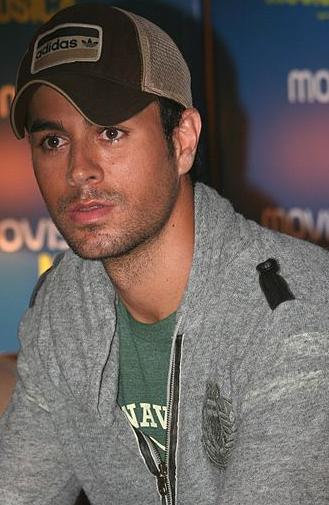
Enrique Iglesias

Also in 1999, attempting to emulate the crossover success of Gloria Estefan, Selena, and Ricky Martin in the anglophone market, Marc Anthony released an English-language Latin Pop self-titled album with the US Top 5 hit single "I Need to Know" and the Spanish version "Dímelo". Other hits include "When I Dream At Night" and "My Baby You". His song "You Sang To Me" was featured in Runaway Bride. The successful dance version was re-mixed by Dutch producer Rene Van Verseveld. The foray was considered a mixed success, partly because it alienated his traditional salsa fans, though "Da La Vuelta" (not a Spanish version of any of the songs) was a salsa song and was a hit.

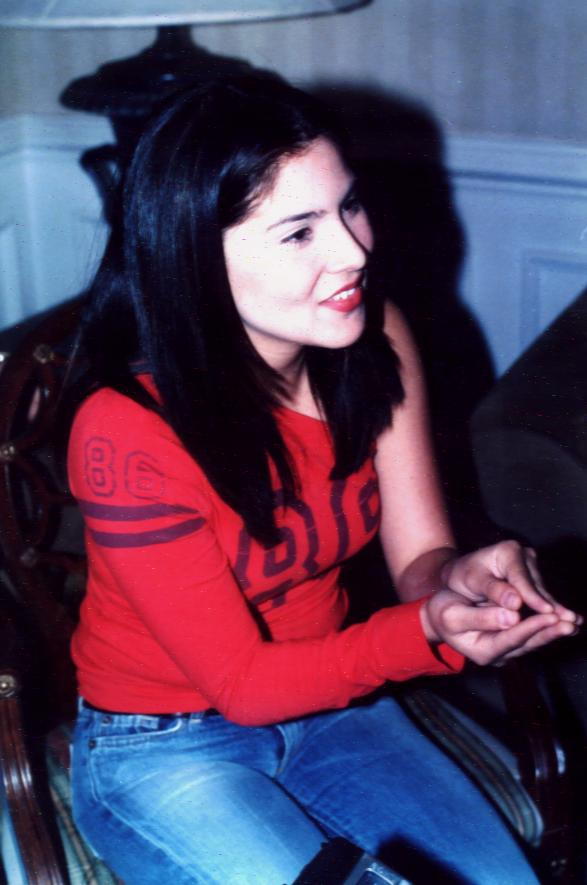
Jaci Velasquez

Enrique Iglesias had begun a successful crossover career into the English language music market. Thanks to other successful crossover acts, Latino artists and music had a great surge in popularity in mainstream music. Iglesias's contribution to the soundtrack of Will Smith's movie Wild Wild West, "Bailamos", became a number–one hit in the US. After the success of "Bailamos", several mainstream record labels were eager to sign Enrique. Signing a multi-album deal after weeks of negotiations with Interscope, Iglesias recorded and released his first full CD in English, Enrique. The pop album, with some Latin influences, took two months to complete and contained a duet with Whitney Houston called "Could I Have This Kiss Forever" and a cover of the Bruce Springsteen song "Sad Eyes". The album's third single, "Be With You", became his second number one.

Jennifer Lopez's debut album On the 6, a reference to the subway line she used to take growing up in Castle Hill, was released on June 1, 1999, and reached the top ten of the Billboard 200. The album featured the Billboard Hot 100 number-one lead single, "If You Had My Love", as well as the top ten hit "Waiting for Tonight", and even the Spanish version of the song "Una Noche Mas" became a hit as well. The album also featured a Spanish language, Latin-flavored duet "No Me Ames" with Marc Anthony, who later would become her husband. Although "No Me Ames" never had a commercial release, it reached number one on the U.S. Hot Latin Tracks.

By the mid-nineties, sales of Spanish language albums in the US by such acts as Luis Miguel, Enrique Iglesias and Ricky Martin had increased to compete with English language acts. To reflect the growing interest in Latin acts the American Music Awards instituted a category for Latin recording artists.

Martin was seen as the forerunner of a trend in pop music of using Latin tropes which the press dubbed a "Latin Pop explosion" or "Latin invasion".

=== 2000s Latin pop boom ===
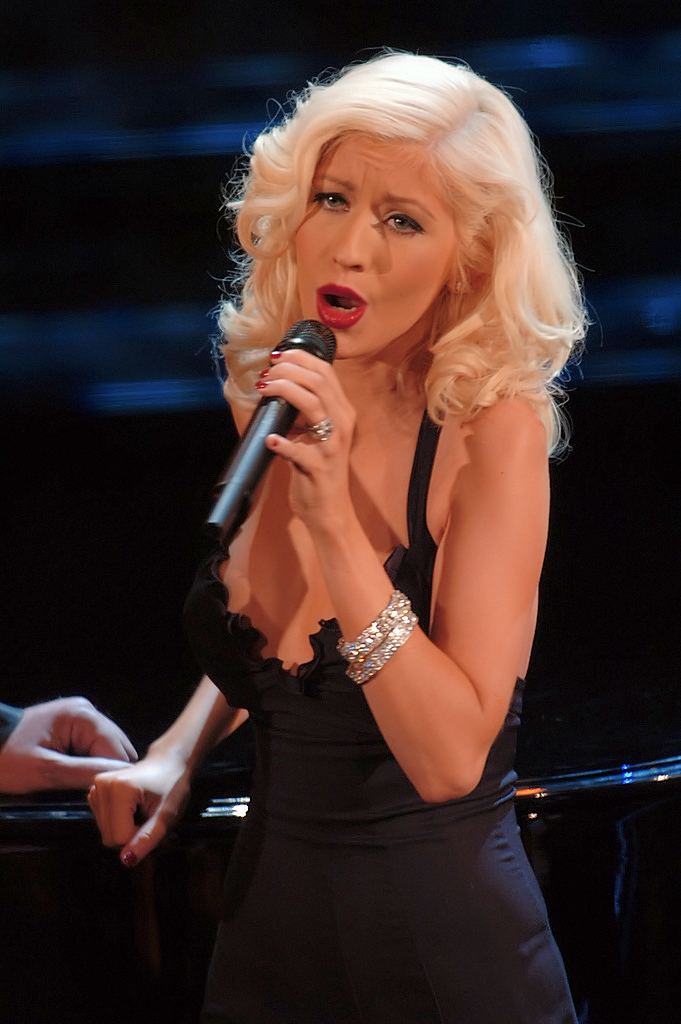
Christina Aguilera

After the 1990s, there were very few crossover acts that became successful in the 2000s. The only ones who proved successful were Shakira, Thalía, Paulina Rubio, Jennifer Lopez and Christina Aguilera, although the latter started at first in English and then turned to Spanish. Both Ricky Martin and Enrique Iglesias retained their roles as one of the most successful crossover artists this decade.

Colombian singer Shakira, who had been successful in the Latin world in the late 1990s, began working on an English crossover album in 2001. Thanks to other successful crossover acts in the 1990s, the crossover of Spanish artists to the English market had a great surge of popularity in mainstream music and it was the next logical step to Shakira and her label for her career, and Shakira worked for over a year on new material for the album. "Whenever, Wherever" ("Suerte" in Spanish countries) was released as the first and lead single from Shakira's first English album and third studio album throughout the period of August 2001 and February 2002. The song took heavy influence from Andean music, including the charango and panpipes in its instrumentation. Produced by Shakira, the track was internationally successful, reaching number one in most countries. It was also her first success in the U.S., reaching No. 6 on the Hot 100.

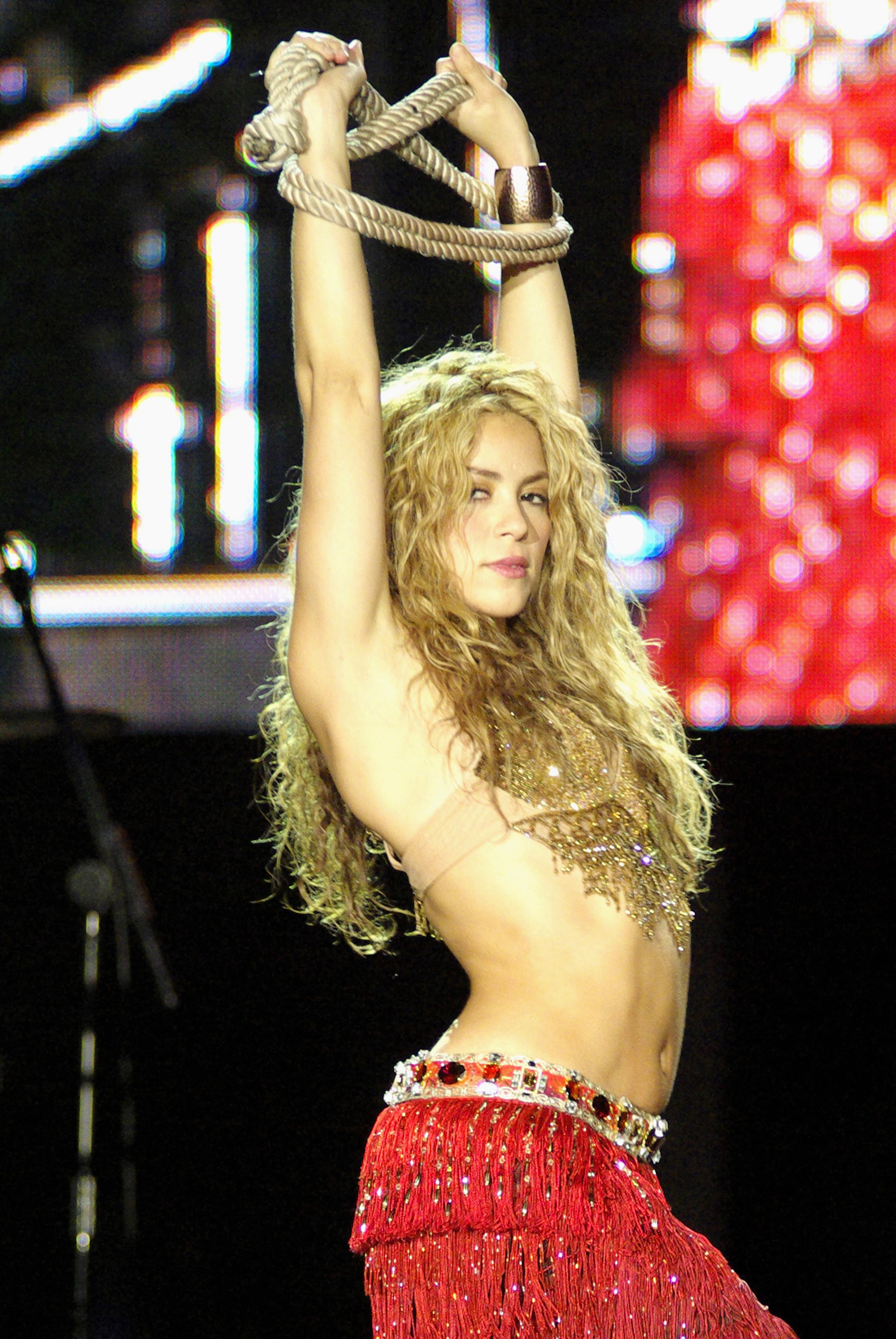
Shakira

Shakira's third studio album and first English language album, Laundry Service (Servicio De Lavandería, in Latin America and Spain) was released on November 13, 2001. The album debuted at number three on the U.S. Billboard 200 chart, selling over 200,000 records in its first week. Laundry Service was later certified triple platinum by the RIAA in May 2002 (six months after the album released) as well and thus helped to establish Shakira's musical presence in the mainstream North American market. Seven songs from the album became international singles and hit mainstream as well: "Whenever, Wherever" ("Suerte"), "Underneath Your Clothes", "Objection (Tango)" ("Te Aviso, Te Anuncio (Tango)"), "The One", "Te Dejo Madrid", "Que Me Quedes Tú", and "Poem to a Horse", with four of the singles becoming largely successful.

Because the album was created for the English language market, the rock and Spanish dance-influenced album gained mild critical success, while some critics claimed that her English skills were too weak for her to write songs for it. Rolling Stone stated "She sounds downright silly", and "Shakira's magic is lost in translation." Shakira's Latin fans also criticized her for seemingly abandoning her folk and rock roots in favor of contemporary American pop music. Despite this fact, the album became the best-selling album of 2002, selling 13 million copies worldwide and becoming the most successful album of her career to date.

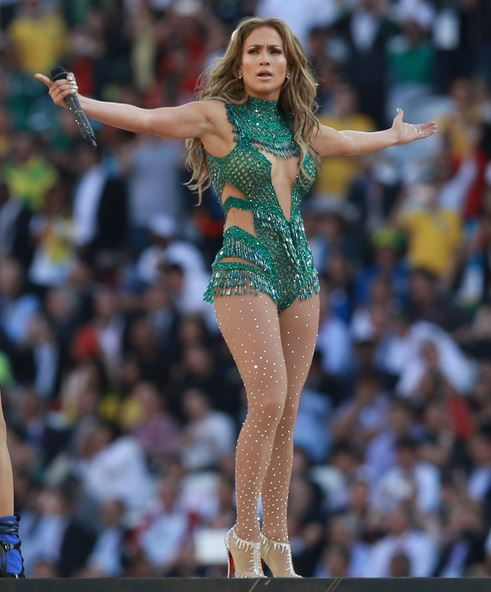
Jennifer Lopez

After that success, Shakira's second English studio album, Oral Fixation Vol. 2, was released on November 29, 2005. The album debuted at number five on the Billboard 200, selling 128,000 copies in its first week. The album has gone on to sell 1.8 million records in the U.S., earning a Platinum certification from the RIAA. Oddly enough, the Spanish counterpart was practically equally successful snatching more than 1.5 million copies to date according to RIAA. Oral Fixation Vol. 2 has also gone on to sell over 8 million copies worldwide. The album, went on to spawn two more singles. "Hips Don't Lie", featuring Wyclef Jean, was released as the album's second single in February 2006. The song went on to become the highest–selling single of the 21st century and became Shakira's first number-one single on the Billboard Hot 100, in addition to reaching number one in over 50 countries. Shakira and Wyclef Jean also recorded a bamboo version of the song to serve as the official theme of the 2006 FIFA World Cup.

In early 2007, Shakira worked with American R&B singer Beyoncé for the track "Beautiful Liar" which was released as the second single from the deluxe edition of Knowles' B'Day. In April 2007, the single jumped ninety-one positions, from ninety-four to three, on the Billboard Hot 100 chart, setting the record for the largest upward movement in the history of the chart at the time.

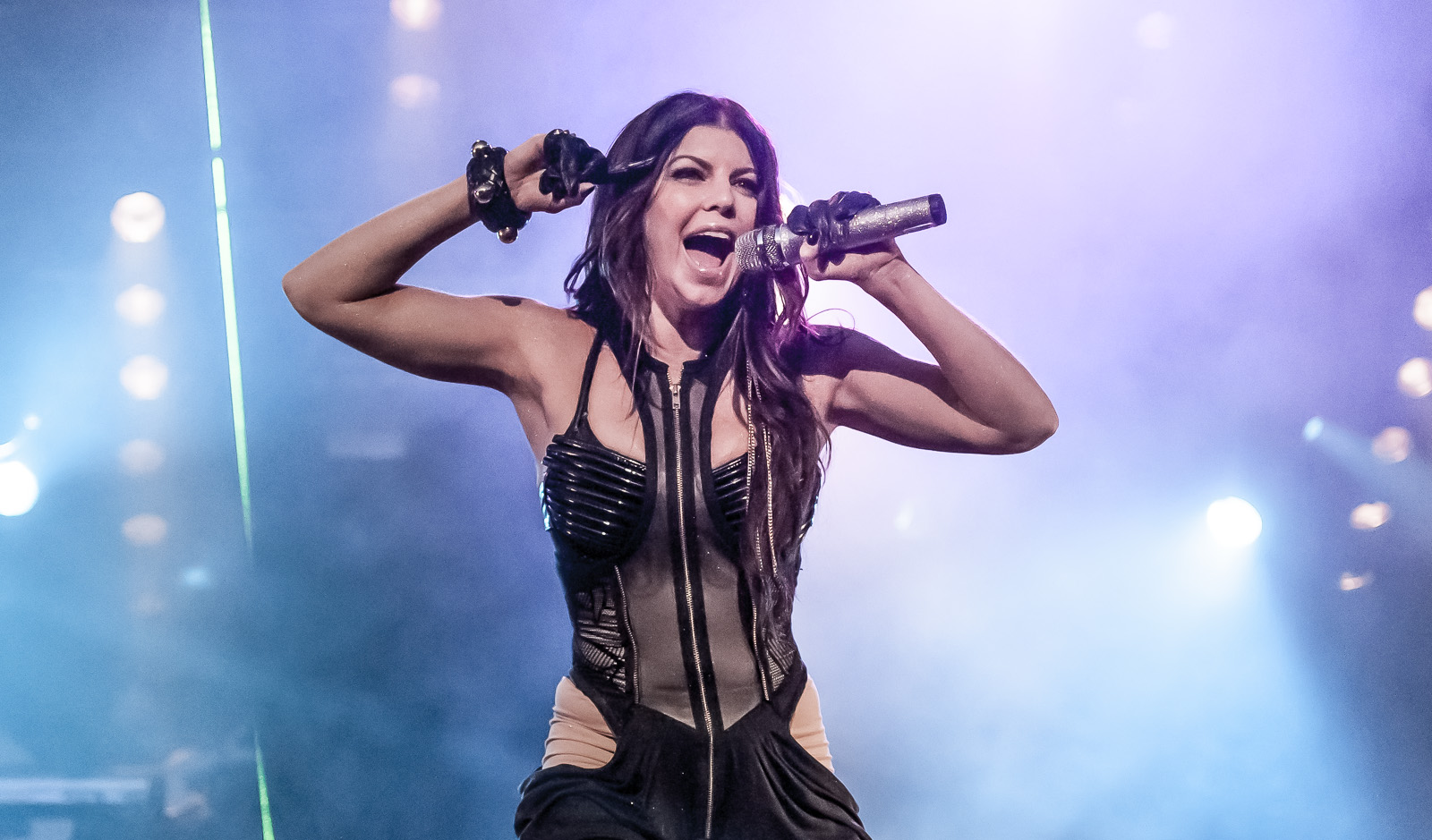
Fergie

After that success, She Wolf was released in October 2009 internationally and then on November 23, 2009, in the U.S. The album received mainly positive reviews from critics, but only managed to sell 89,000 copies in its first week in the U.S., earning the number–15 spot on the Billboard 200. It has gone on to sell only 300,000 records in the U.S., becoming her least successful album there. However, the album has been moderately successful worldwide, having been certified Gold in Russia, Ireland, Switzerland, Poland, France, Argentina, Greece, and Hungary, Platinum in Spain, the United Kingdom, and the Middle East, 2× Platinum in Colombia and Mexico, and 3× Platinum in Taiwan. To date, the album has sold 3 million copies worldwide, becoming Shakira's least commercially successful studio album so far. The lead single, "She Wolf" and "Loba" were successful worldwide, reaching number one in Latin America, number two in Germany, Ireland, Italy, Estonia and Spain, number three in Switzerland and Austria, number four in the UK, France and Greece, number five in Canada and Belgium, number six in Finland, number nine in Japan, and number 11 in the U.S.

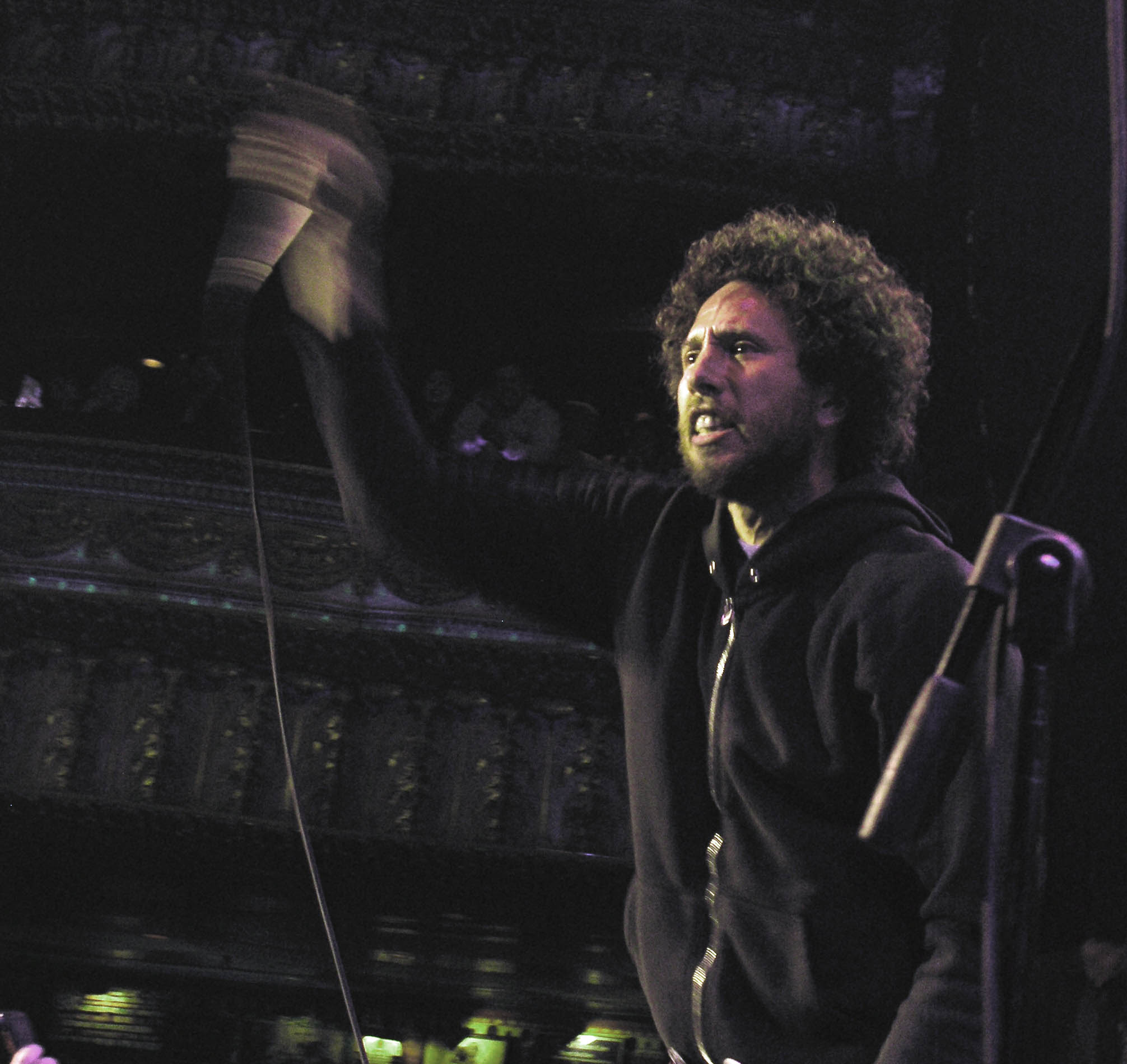
Zack de la Rocha on stage with Rage Against the Machine in 2007

Christina Aguilera had been very successful in English, as in 2000, Aguilera began recording her first Spanish-language album with producer Rudy Pérez in Miami. Later in 2000, Aguilera first emphasized her Latin heritage by releasing her first Spanish album, Mi Reflejo, on 12 September 2000. This album contained Spanish versions of songs from her English debut as well as new Spanish tracks. However, some criticized Aguilera for trying to cash in on the Latin American music boom at the time. According to Pérez, Aguilera was only semi-fluent while recording, but she understood the language, having grown up with her father, a native of Ecuador. He added, "Her Latin roots are undeniable." The album peaked at number 27 on the Billboard 200 and went number one on the Billboard Latin Charts for a record 20 weeks. In 2001, it won Aguilera a Latin Grammy Award for Best Female Pop Vocal Album. The album went Gold in the U.S. She also won the World Music Award as the best selling Latin artist that year.

Jennifer Lopez officially released her first full Spanish-language album, Como Ama una Mujer, in March 2007. Her husband, singer Marc Anthony, produced the album with Estefano, except for "Qué Hiciste", which Anthony co-produced with Julio Reyes. The album peaked at number ten on the Billboard 200 and number one on the U.S. Top Latin Albums for four straight weeks, and on the U.S. Latin Pop Albums for seven straight weeks. The album did well in Europe, peaking at number three on the albums chart, mainly due to the big success in countries such as Switzerland, Italy, Spain, France, Belgium, Greece, Germany, Austria, and Portugal.

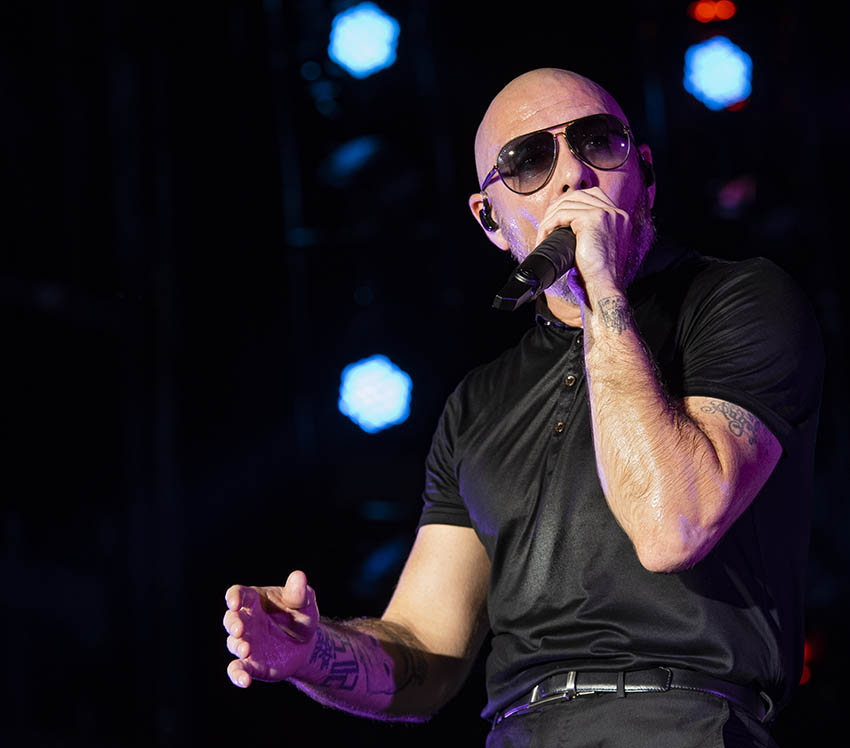
Pitbull

On 24 July 2007, Billboard magazine reported that Lopez and husband Marc Anthony would co-headline a worldwide tour called "Juntos en Concierto" starting in New Jersey on 29 September. Tickets went on sale on August 10. The tour was a mix of her current music, older tunes, and Spanish music. In a later press release, Lopez announced a detailed itinerary. The tour launched 28 September 2007 at the Mark G. Etess Arena and ended on 7 November 2007 at the American Airlines Arena in Miami, Florida. The lead single, "Qué Hiciste", was officially released to radio stations in January 2007. Since then, it has peaked at 86 on the U.S. Billboard Hot 100 and number one on the Hot Latin Songs and the Hot Dance Club Play. It also went top ten on the European chart. The video for the song was the first Spanish-language video to peak at number one on MTV's Total Request Live daily countdown.

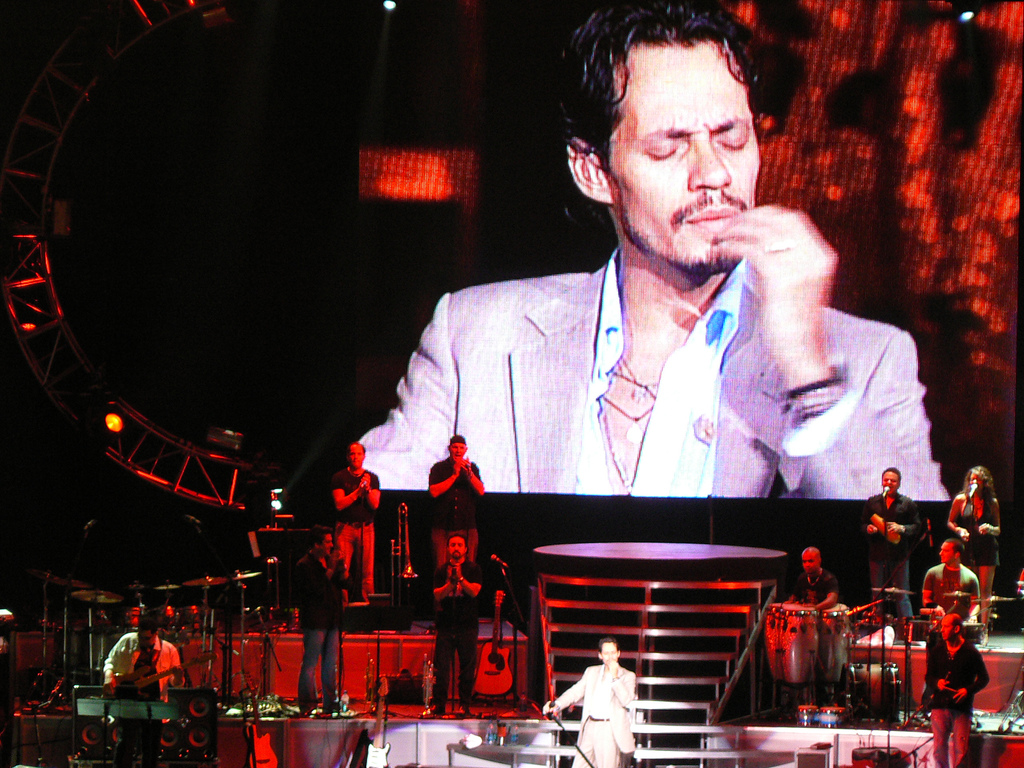
Marc Anthony in 2006

Lopez won an American Music Award as the Favorite Latin Artist in 2007. With Como Ama Una Mujer, Jennifer Lopez is one of the few performers to debut in the top 10 of the Billboard 200 with a Spanish album.

This century also saw the crossover of some of Mexican recording artist like Paulina Rubio and Thalía into the English music industry, with bilingual albums that included hit songs in English and Spanish, and the first solo English-language albums by this Mexican Pop artist. The best recording crossover artist has been Paulina Rubio with her first English-language album being Border Girl released on June 18, 2002. The album's lead single "Don't Say Goodbye" would become her most successful song in English until her second bilingual album Brava! Two of its three singles, "Me Gustas Tanto" (English: I Like You So Much) and "Boys Will Be Boys", became hits for Rubio with "Boys Will Be Boys" being Rubio's most successful English song to date. The other singles released from the Border Girl album were "Casanova" and "I'll Be Right Here (Sexual Lover)". Each of the main single releases, as well as other English songs on the album, have Spanish-language counterparts that became big hits on Billboard's Hot Latin Songs chart and vice versa for songs like "Casanova", which has an English-language counterpart of the same name. The Spanish-language counterpart for the song "I'll Be Right Here (Sexual Lover)" is "Y Yo Sigo Aquí" (English: "And I'm Still Right Here"), the Spanish version of the song by Rubio, taken from her fifth studio album Paulina. Selena Gomez was recognized as the Billboard Woman of the Year in 2017.

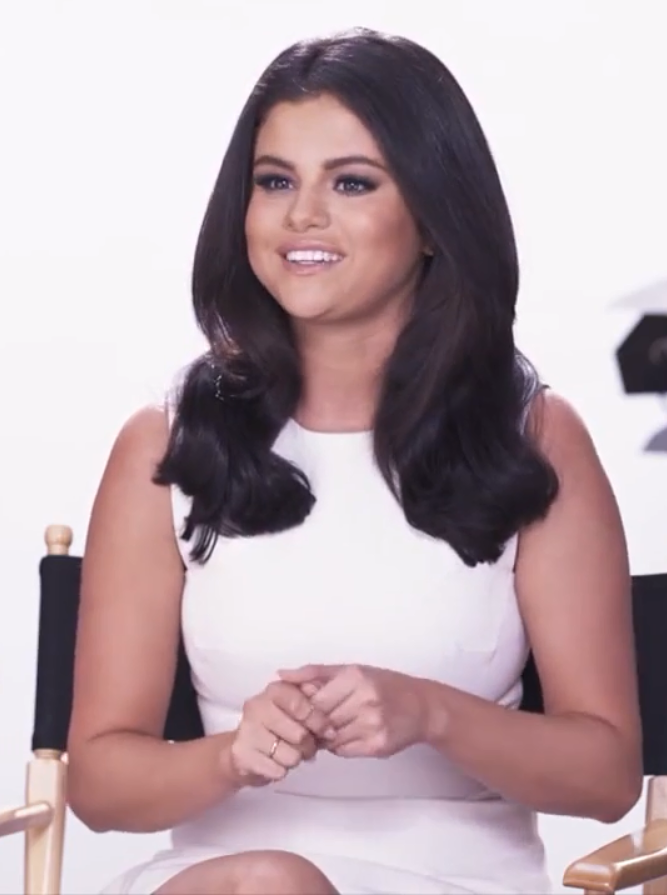
Selena Gomez

In addition to collaborations with English recording artists like Paulina's song "Nada Puede Cambiarme" (English: Nothing Can Change Me), the music video, like the song itself, wouldn't have been complete without presence of the legendary former Guns N' Roses' guitarist, Slash. Thalia collaborated with legendary American pop singer Tony Bennett in the duet "The Way You Look Tonight", which featured on Bennett's album Viva Duets, released in October 2012. Thalía's first English-language album, released in 2003, shares a title with her 1990 and 2002 Spanish-language albums.

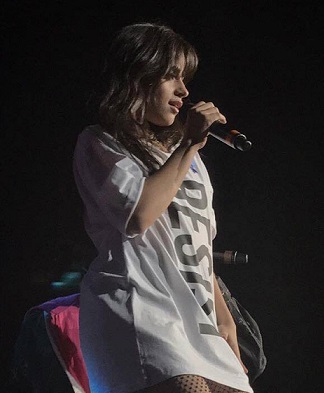
Camila Cabello

"I Want You" was the album's most popular song, peaking at number 22 on the Billboard Hot 100 and number seven in the Mainstream chart. It is her only song to date that has charted within the Billboard Hot 100. In Greece, the song peaked number twenty-six in Top 50 singles sales. The Spanish version of the song, "Me Pones Sexy", was released for the Spanish-language audience and also performed quite well on the Latin charts, peaking within the top ten of the Hot Latin Tracks at number nine. The album's music incorporated Latin pop styles with rock, R&B, dance, and mariachi elements. Vicente Fernandez, Mexican singer of traditional pop ranchera standards and cultural icon, also collaborated with singer Tony Bennett in a duet for Viva Duets with "Return To Me" ("Regresa a Mí").

Shakira collaborated with the South African group Freshlyground to create the official song of the 2010 FIFA World Cup in South Africa, "Waka Waka (This Time for Africa)", which is based on a traditional Cameroonian soldiers' Fang song named "Zangalewa" by the group Zangalewa or Golden Sounds. The song was made popular in her native Colombia in 1987 through west African DJs in Colombia. The single later reached the top 20 in Europe, South America and Africa and the top 40 in the U.S., and was performed by Shakira at the World Cup kick-off and closing. The Spanish version was successful as well.

Sale el Sol was released as Shakira's seventh studio album on 19 October 2010. It has both English and Spanish songs. Shakira and Enrique Iglesias have retained their roles as some of the most successful crossover artists this decade.

In May 2013 Christina Aguilera appeared on Mexican singer Alejandro Fernández's cover of "Hoy Tengo Ganas de Ti" from his album Confidencias.

=== 2010s continued success ===
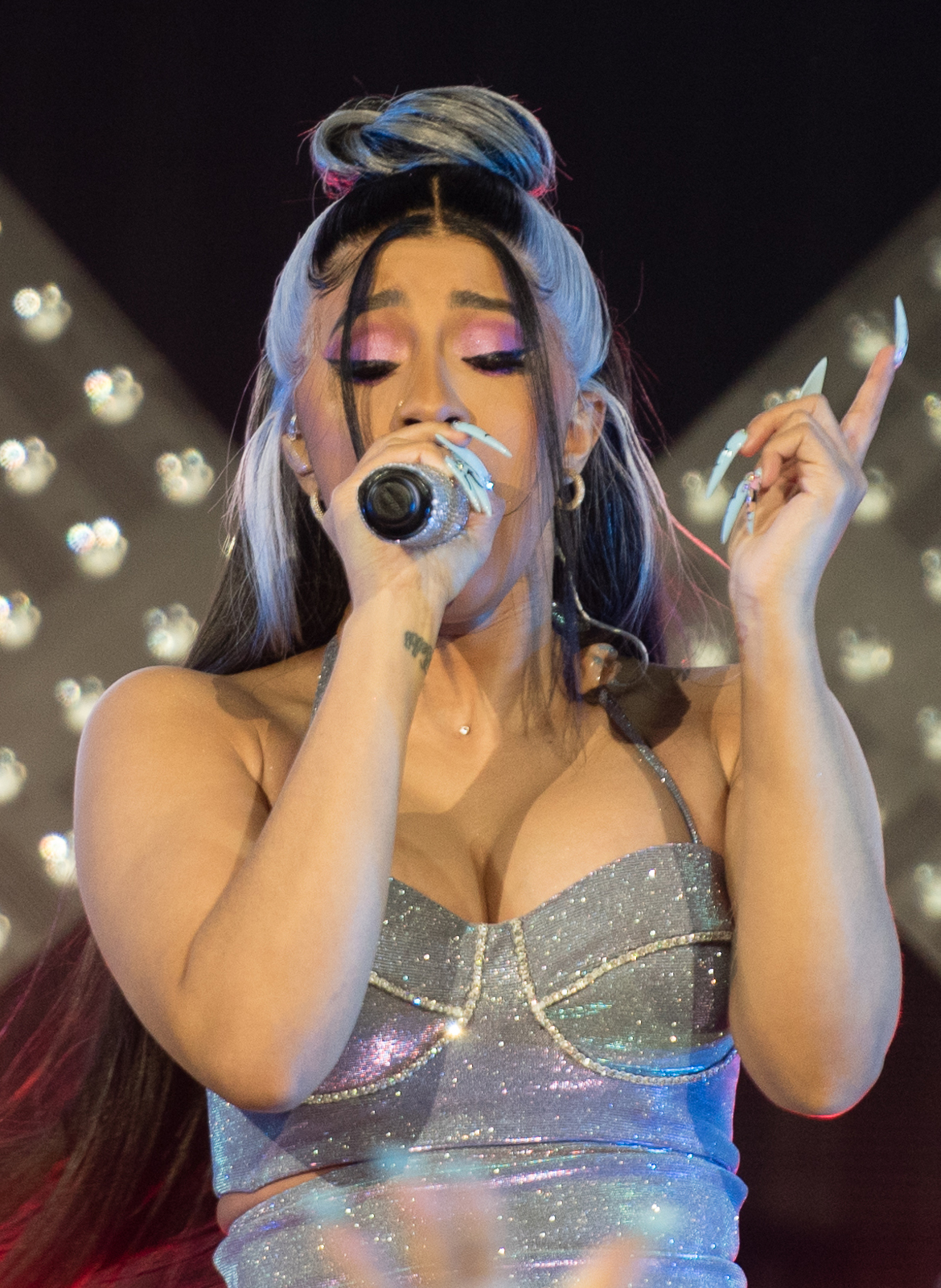
Cardi B

Today, Latin American music has become a term for music performed by Latinos regardless of whether it has a Latin element or not. Acts such as Shakira, Jennifer Lopez, Enrique Iglesias, and Pitbull are prominent on the pop charts. Iglesias, who holds the record for most No. 1s on Billboard's Hot Latin Tracks, released a bilingual album inspired by urban acts, and he frequently releases two completely different songs to Latin and pop formats at the same time. Mainstream artists and producers tend to feature more on songs from Latin artists and it has also become more likely that English language songs crossover to Spanish radio and vice versa.

Viva Duets is a studio album by Tony Bennett, released in October 2012. The album is sung in English, Spanish and Portuguese, and features Latin American singers. Album's adaptations were written by Andres Castro, Edgar Barrera, Miguel Bose, Ricardo Arjona, Kany Garcia, Thalia, Franco De Vita, Dani Martin, and Mario Molina Montez.

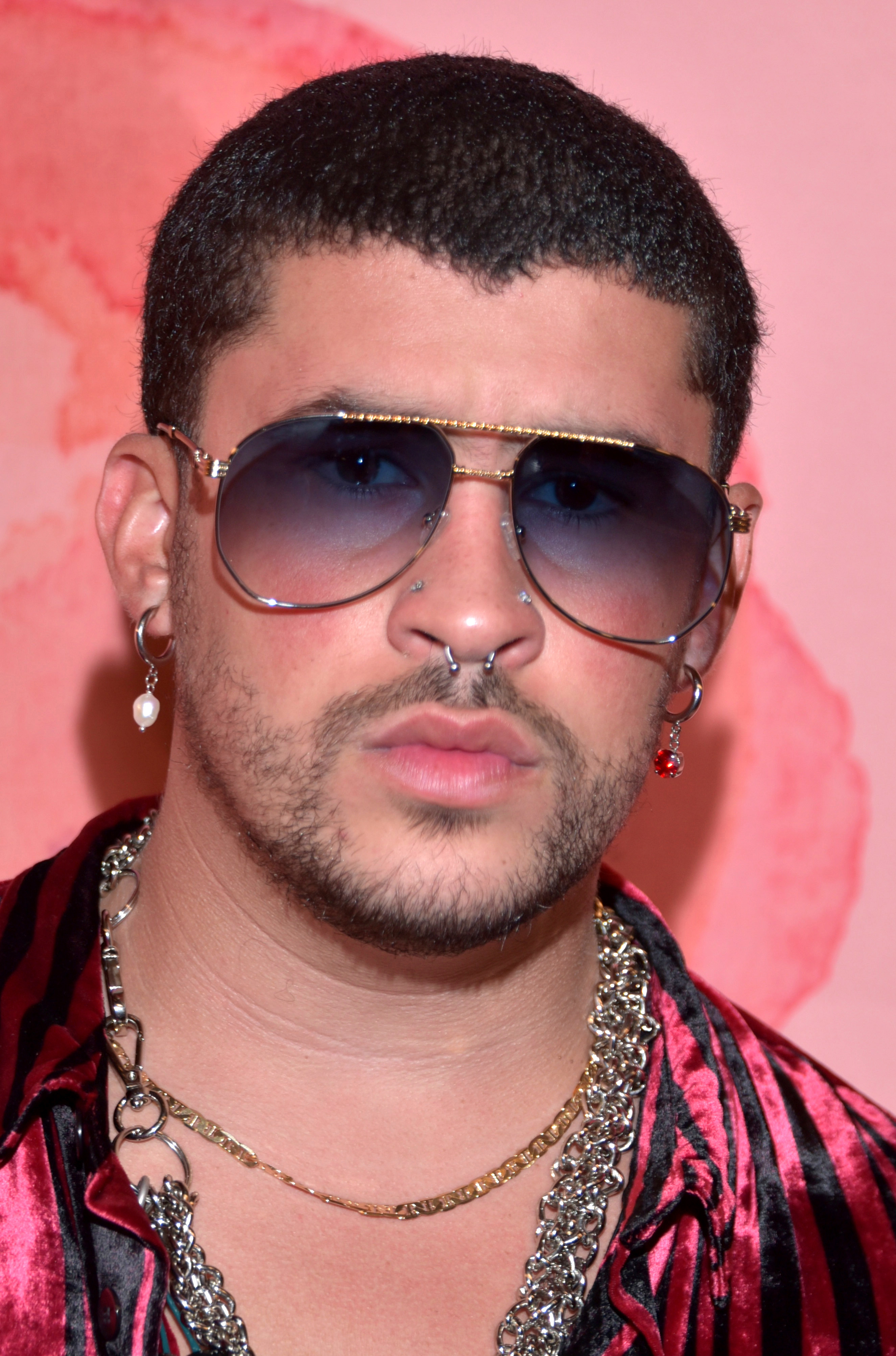
Bad Bunny

The 2014 FIFA World Cup opening ceremony had performers that were dressed as several types of trees and flowers. The entire ensemble performed three separate acts leading up to the finale where the ball opened up to reveal Brazilian singer Claudia Leitte, who sang alone for a few minutes before being joined by Jennifer Lopez and Pitbull, with whom she performed the tournament's official song "We Are One (Ole Ola)", which was co-written and recorded by the three artists. Both the Cuban-American rapper and Mexican-American pop star Pitbull and Becky G were invited to perform at the closing ceremony of the Copa América Centenario soccer tournament at the MetLife Stadium in 2016. After having done English music, with only one song having mainstream success, ever since 2016, Gomez herself has released several Spanish singles: "Sola", "Mangú", "Todo Cambio", and "Mayores". Gomez has confirmed that her debut album will be completely in Spanish. Three-time Grammy nominated Miguel del Aguila has represented the cross-over between Latin and classical with his 45 CDs released and over 125 works.

Plácido Domingo Jr. is the son of Plácido Domingo who released his first album, Latidos, in Spanish in April 2017, followed with the English version, Heartbeat, in the third quarter of 2017.

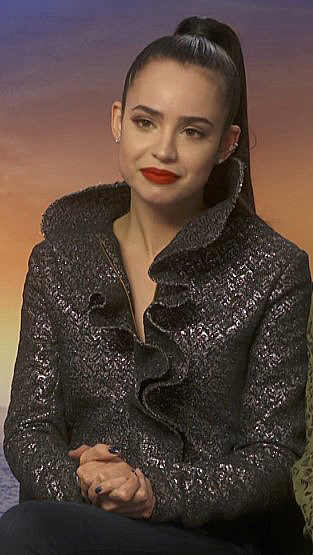
Sofia Carson in October 2017

In 2018, Latin music became the fifth most popular and successful music genre in the U.S., surpassing country and EDM. Nearly 11 percent of song consumption (including streams and digital sales) and 9.4 percent of album consumption (streams, physical and digital sales) in 2018 was from Latin music.

91 percent of the $135 million produced by the Latin music market last year came from either paid subscription platforms such as Spotify, or ad revenue from streaming services like YouTube.

In 2017, Luis Fonsi and Daddy Yankee's "Despacito" (which also became the most viewed video in the site's history), was the most viewed music video on YouTube that year. In 2018, that accolade was passed on to the remix of Nio García, Casper Mágico and Darrell's "Te Boté" featuring Nicky Jam, Bad Bunny, and Ozuna, which currently has 1.8 billion views. Of the top 10 most viewed music videos on YouTube in 2018, eight were from Latin music artists. The Latin pop song "Havana" by Camila Cabello featuring Young Thug reached No. 1 on the Hot 100.

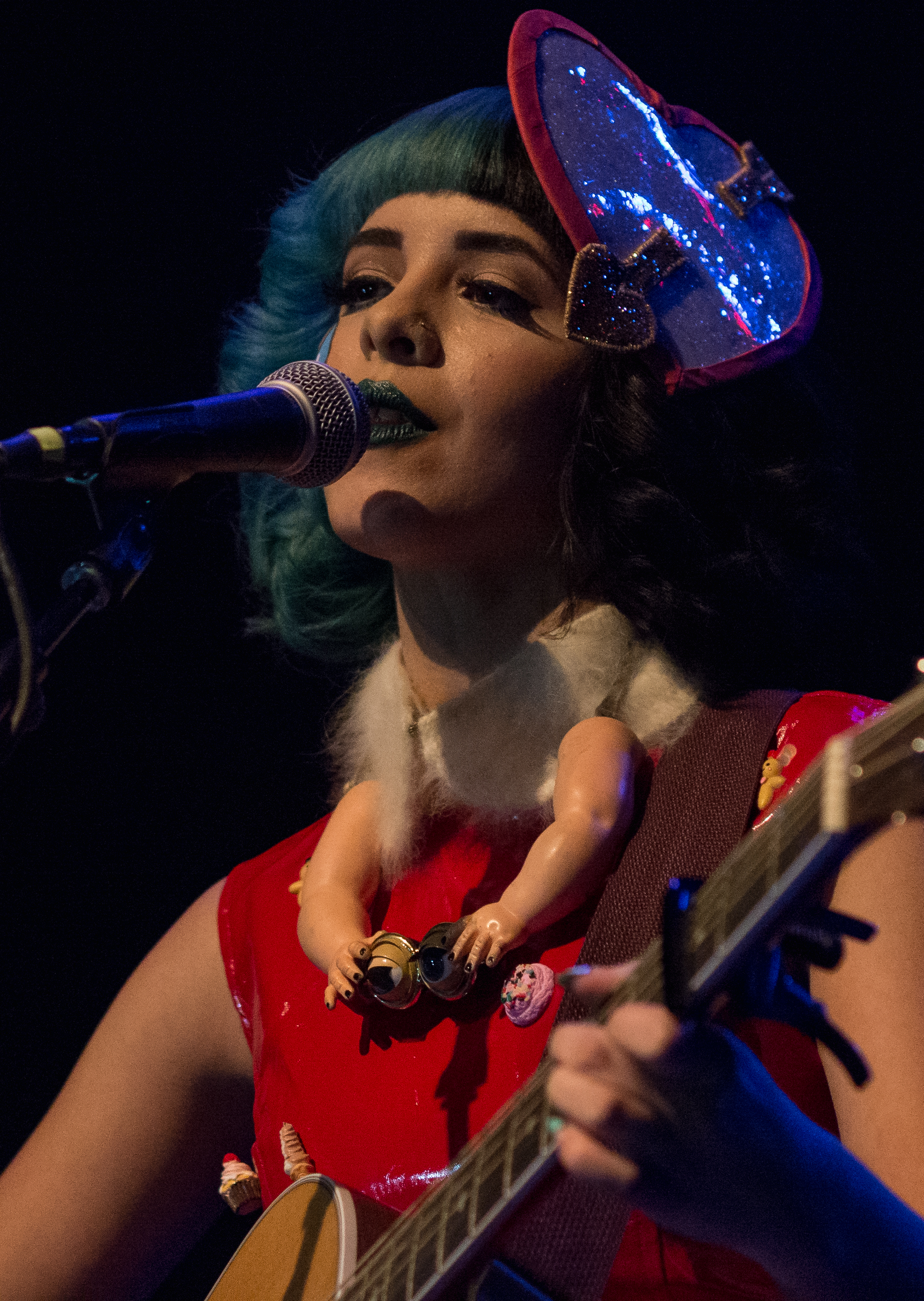
Melanie Martinez in February 2014

Perhaps the biggest subgenre of Latin American Music, Latin Trap has emerged to be one of the most popular genres of music to this day. Latin Trap, also known as Spanish Trap or trapeton, is a style of trap music that is infused and influenced by Latin Hip Hop and Reggaeton.

Bad Bunny started into music in 2016 is a chart-topping Latin trap artist based in San Juan. It gave hit songs like "I Like It" with Cardi B and J Balvin, which became the first Latin trap song to reach No. 1 the Billboard Hot 100, and "MIA" featuring Drake, which debuted at No. 5 on the Hot 100 in October 2018.

The 2018 Top Latin Artist Billboard award was won by Dominican-Puerto Rican reggaeton and Latin trap singer, Ozuna. Ozuna's infectious music has put him on top of Latin song charts and was even named YouTube's most watched artist of 2018.

Ozuna released his first studio album titled Odisea on August 25, 2017. His song, "Me Niego", alongside Reik and Wisin, peaked at number 6 and his song "El Farsante", featuring Romeo Santos, peaked at number 2. In his second studio album, Aura, he took part in one of the most anticipated collaborations of the year with Cardi B, and their song, "La Modelo", debuted at number 3 on the Hot Latin charts. Ozuna's most recent collaboration was with American singer Selena Gomez, Cardi B, and DJ Snake. Their song, "Taki Taki", took the U.S by storm. It debuted at number 1 and then led the Hot Latin chart for 13 weeks.

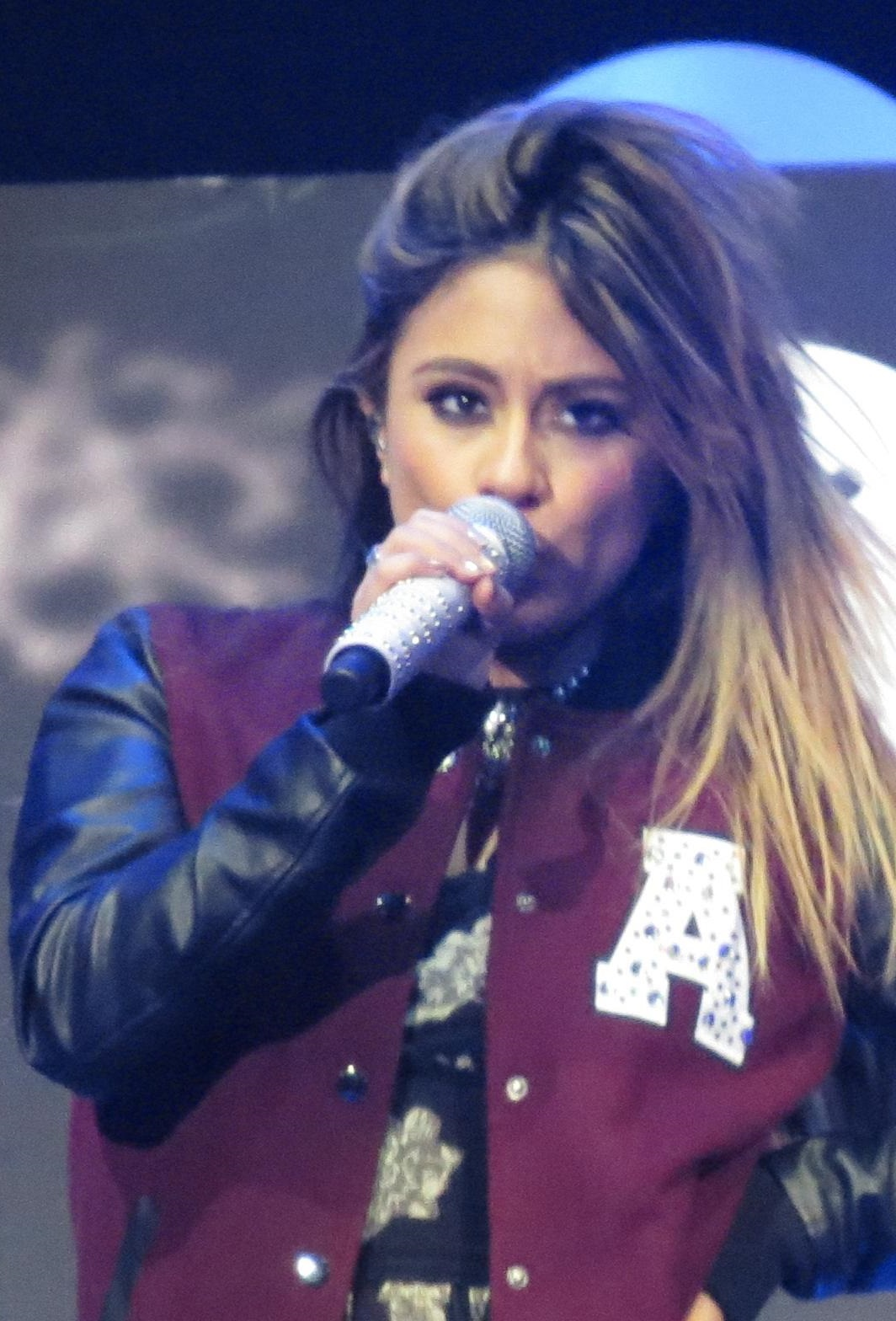
Ally Brooke

The popularity of Latin music has increased over the years. While Latin music has always had a place in the American music industry, there's certainly been a rise of the music and has become mainstream. Its high demand has helped many Spanish speaking artists. It is reaching a greater audience in the United States and outside the Spanish speaking world. The growth of Latin music has resulted for the opportunity for female Latin artists to dominate in the music industry as well.

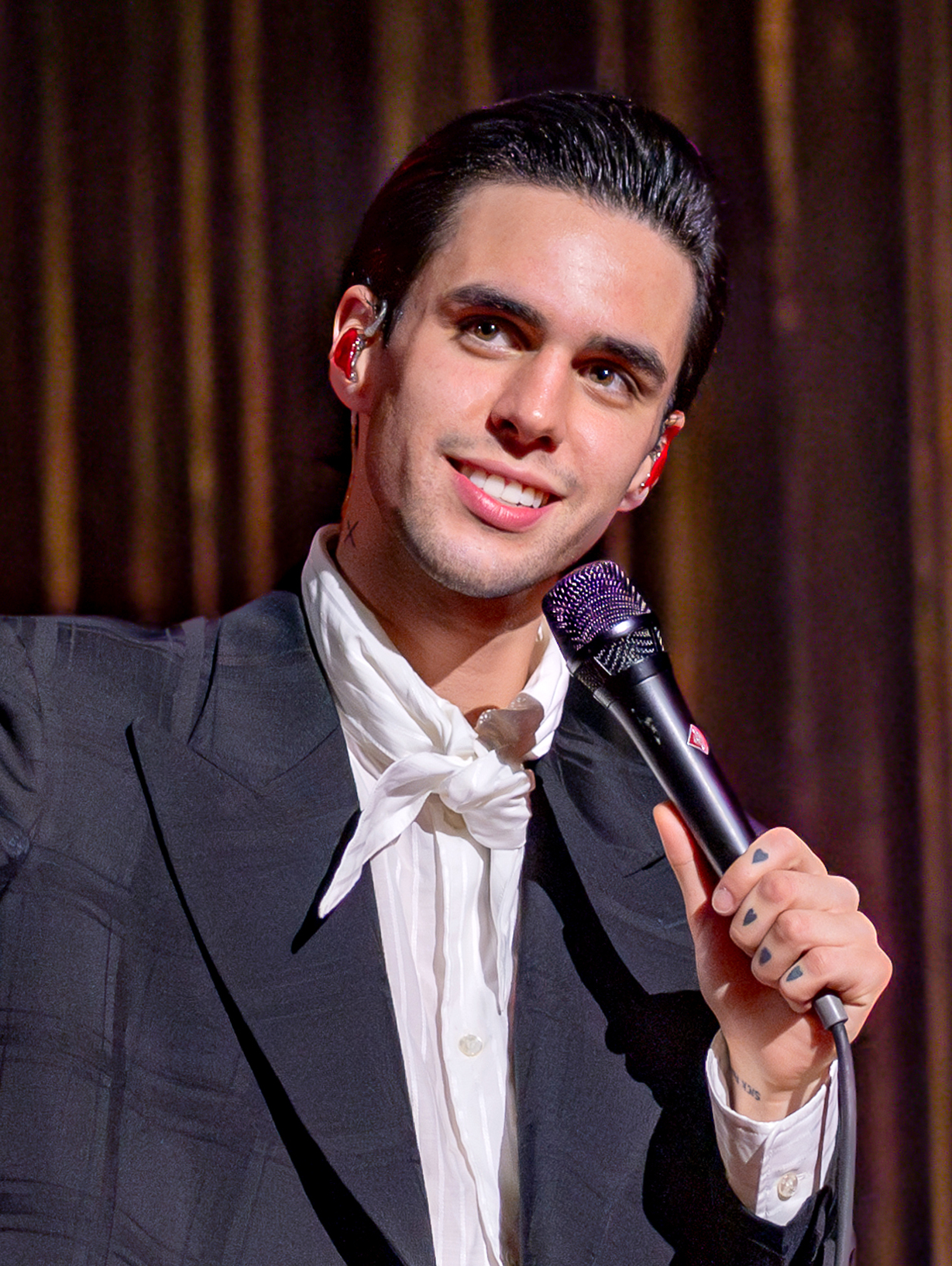
Stephen Sanchez

2018 was a breakthrough year for women in Latin music. Female artists like Dominican singer and songwriter Natti Natasha and singer and actress Becky G are a few of the young Latinas who climbed the male dominated reggaeton music charts in 2018. This was especially true after Becky G and Natti Natasha's song, “Sin Pajamas”, ranked in the top ten most viewed music uploads worldwide, according to Rolling Stone. Latin pop growth has helped non-Latin recording artist as they pair with popular Latin stars, thus increasing collaborations. The collaborative efforts between Spanish speaking and English speaking artist is a testament to how big the genre has gotten. In 2018, Latin pop appears to have been more traction than it did in the 1990s Latin boom.

Latin pop and other Latin music genres such as reggaeton continued to be successful in the 2020s. The Super Bowl LIV halftime show was co-headlined by Jennifer Lopez and Shakira, with guest appearances by J Balvin, Bad Bunny, and Lopez's daughter, Emme Muñiz in 2020. Bad Bunny's YHLQMDLG (2020) achieved the biggest streaming week ever for a Latin album in the United States. Carrie Underwood teamed up with Spanish singer David Bisbal in 2020 for a new single, “Tears of Gold.” The song marks Underwood's first-ever bilingual single, with both vocalists singing in English and in Spanish.

Selena Gomez released her first Spanish-language project, Revelación, in March 2021. It incorporated urbano influences. Anitta's Envolver song became the first song by a Latin female act to reach the number one on Spotify Global Daily chart, reaching the number two on the Billboard Global 200 and the number one in Billboard Global Excl. U.S. The soundtrack of Encanto, Disney's 2021 animated fantasy film, written and produced by American playwright Lin-Manuel Miranda, was a viral phenomenon, enjoying widespread popularity on the internet. It has spent multiple weeks atop the Billboard 200 chart. Far Out called the phenomenon "Encanto-mania". The TikTok videos tagged with the hashtag "#encanto" have received more than 11.5 billion views in total, as of January 23, 2022. The most popular song of the soundtrack was "We Don't Talk About Bruno", a salsa tune which experienced widespread commercial success in 2022. "Dos Oruguitas" was nominated for the Academy Award for Best Original Song at the 94th Academy Awards. Christina Aguilera's Spanish-language extended play La Fuerza (2022) debuted at number two at the Latin Pop Albums chart, and was followed by the critically acclaimed studio album Aguilera the same year.

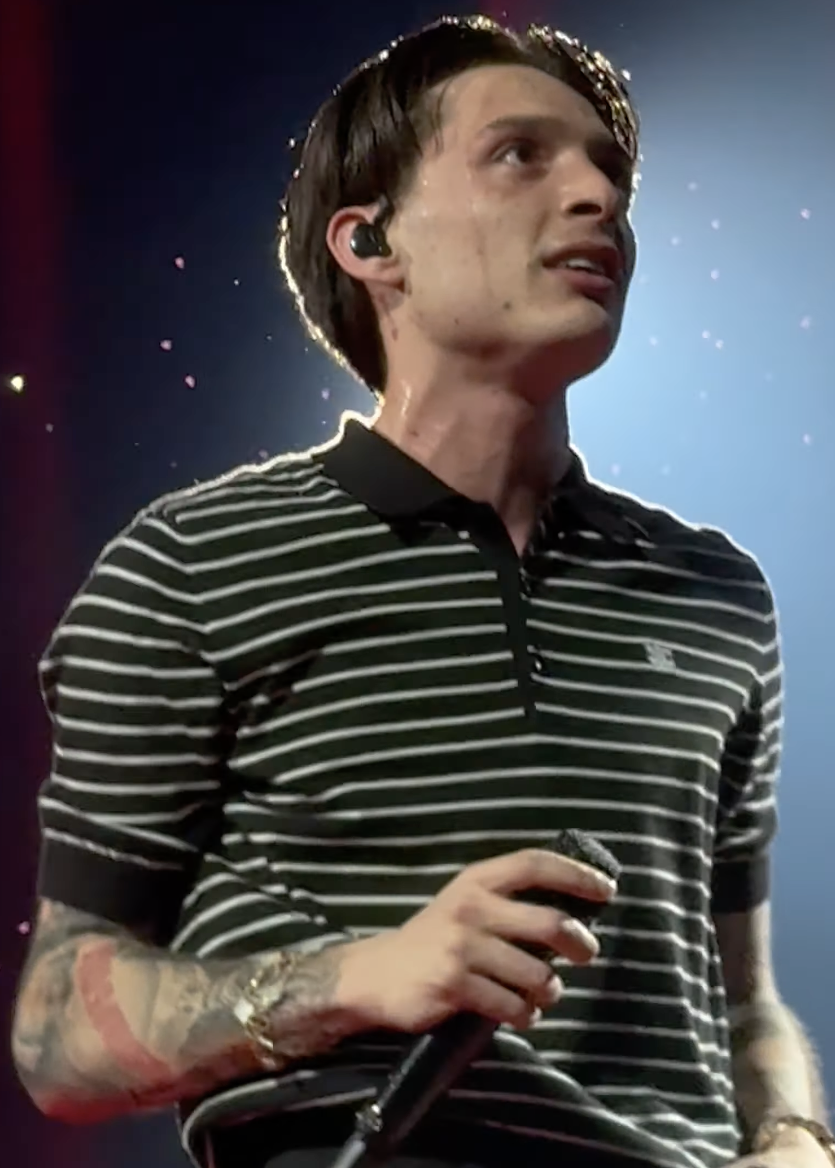
Peso Pluma

Peso Pluma is a Mexican singer known for his contributions to regional Mexican music. He began releasing music on streaming platforms in 2020 and gained wider recognition in the early 2020s. His work draws heavily from regional Mexican genres, which has contributed to the genre’s increased visibility in international music markets. Born in Guadalajara, Mexico, he later reached mainstream audiences in the United States despite longstanding industry perceptions that regional Mexican music had limited crossover appeal beyond traditional audiences.

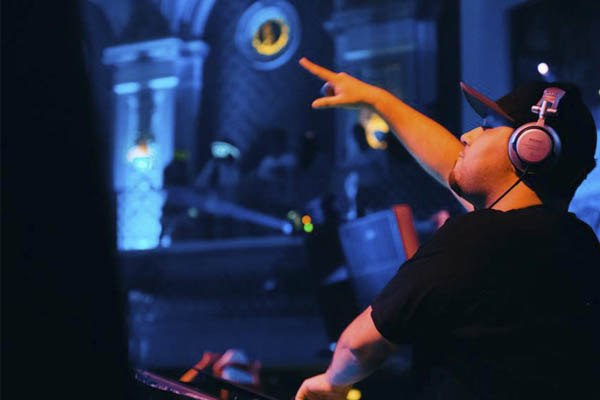
Deorro is an American DJ and producer known for his electronic and Latin-influenced music.

Grupo Frontera is an American regional Mexican band whose members have roots in both Texas and Mexico. The group consists of Adelaido “Payo” Solis III, Juan Javier Cantú, Julián Peña Jr., Alberto “Beto” Acosta, Carlos Guerrero, and Brian Ortega. Formed in 2022, the band performs primarily in regional Mexican styles, including norteño and cumbia-influenced music.

The group gained international recognition through collaborations with other artists, including the single “Un x100to” with Bad Bunny, which reached the top five of the Billboard Hot 100. Grupo Frontera also appeared during Bad Bunny’s headlining performance at the Coachella Music Festival, marking a notable appearance by regional Mexican musicians on the festival’s main stage.

== Awards ==
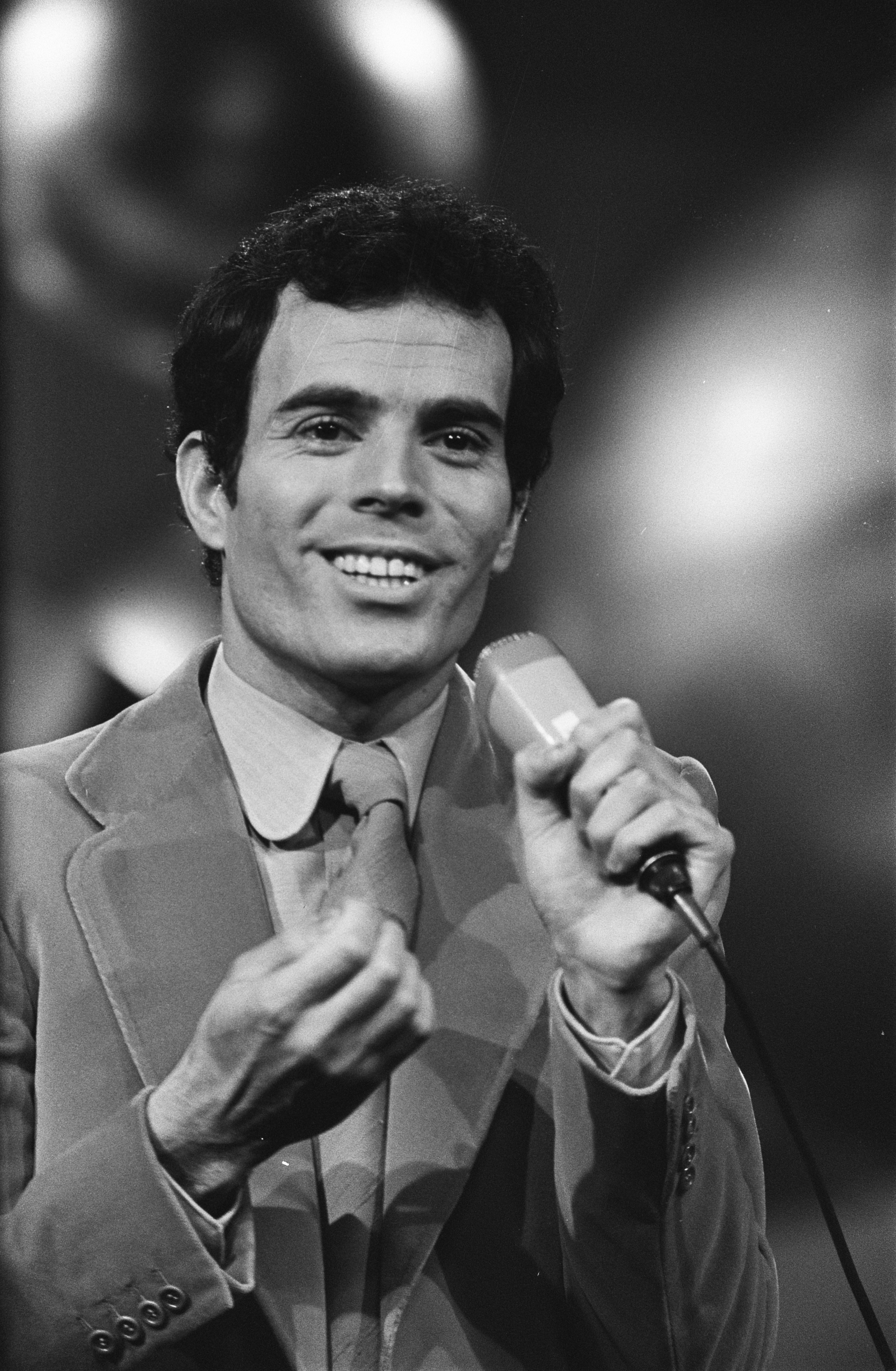
Julio Iglesias moved to Miami, Florida, in the United States, signed a deal with CBS International at the Eurovision Song Contest 1970.

The Grammy Awards, a ceremony that was established in 1958 and originally called the Gramophone Awards, awards Latin performers in four categories as of 2018: The Grammy for Best Latin Pop Album, Best Latin Rock, Urban or Alternative Album, Best Regional Mexican Music Album (including Tejano), and Best Tropical Latin Album. The ALMA Award, also highlighting the best American Latino contributions to music, promote fair and accurate portrayals of Latinos and was first awarded in 1995.

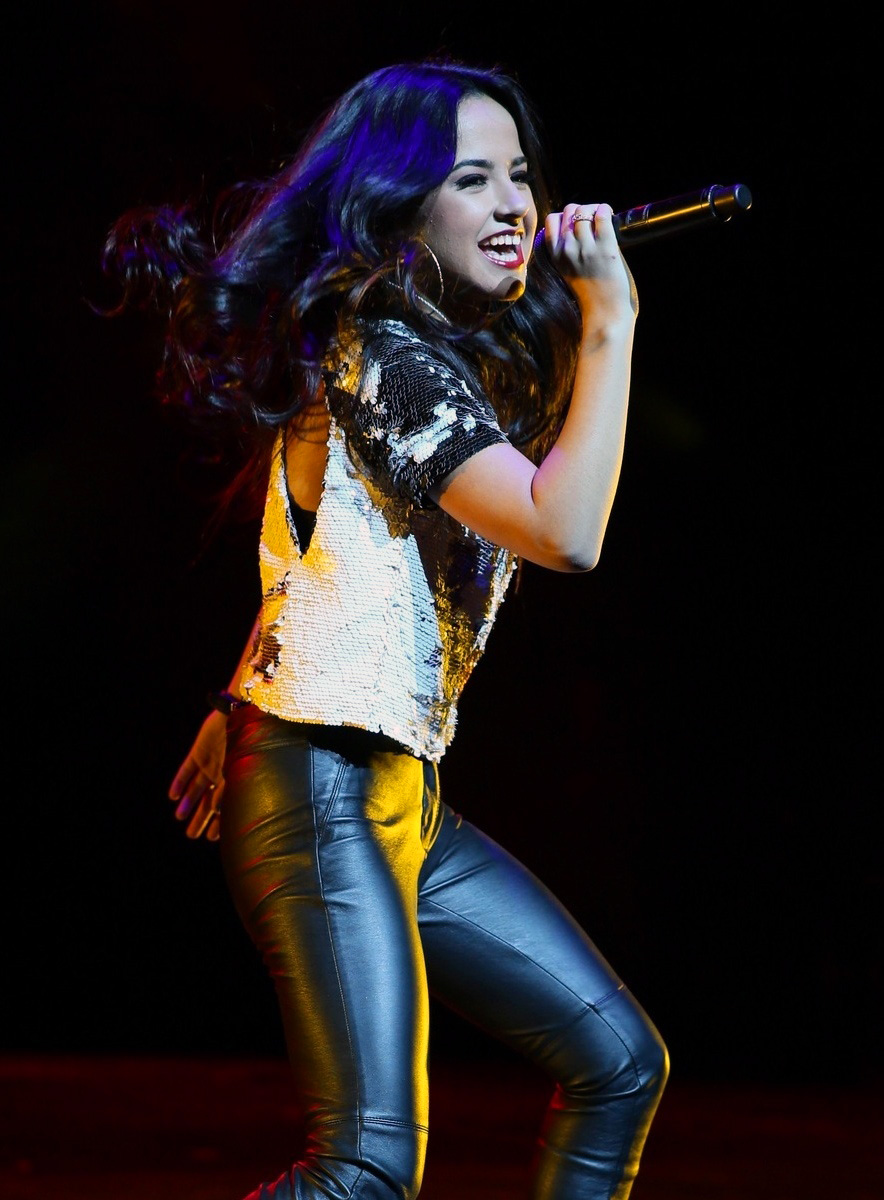
Becky G won favorite female Latin artist at the AMAs in 2020.

The most prestigious Latin American music awards in Spanish in the United States are broadcast by the two biggest Spanish networks Univision and Telemundo. Univision is the broadcaster of the Latin Grammy Awards and Premios Lo Nuestro ("Our Thing Awards"). Before the Latin Grammy Awards inception in 2000, the Lo Nuestro Awards were considered as the Grammy Award equivalent for Latin music. Therefore, the Lo Nuestro ceremony was advanced from May to February since the first Latin Grammy Awards were held in September 2000.

Premios Lo Nuestro was first awarded in 1989 by the network to honor the previous year's top artists in Latin music with nominees initially selected by Univision and Billboard and winners decided by viewers. After Billboard created its own Latin Awards ceremony in 1994, the nominees and winners were selected by a poll conducted among program directors of Spanish-language radio stations throughout the United States, with results were tabulated and certified by Arthur Andersen. In 2004, the network launched Premios Juventud ("Youth Awards"), a viewer-decided awards show (similar in format and identical in target audience to the Teen Choice Awards), honoring Latinos in film, music, sports, fashion and pop culture. On August 24, 2005, Univision acquired the rights to broadcast the Latin Grammy Awards (which aired on the network for the first time exclusively in Spanish on November 3 of that year), after organizers with the Latin Recording Academy chose to end its four-year relationship with CBS, having canceled the 2001 broadcast following the September 11 attacks, were rebuffed by executives with that network in efforts to retool the show to better cater to a Latino audience. The Latin Recording Academy extended its agreement with Univision to televise the Latin Grammys for six years on June 26, 2012. Telemundo is the broadcaster of the Billboard magazine with the Billboard Latin Music Awards first awarded in 1994. In October 2015, through a licensing agreement with Dick Clark Productions signed in July 2014, Telemundo became the originating broadcaster of the Latin American Music Awards (Premios de la Música Latinoamericana), a Latin music-focused version of the American Music Awards. For the 63rd Annual Grammy Awards, the academy announced several changes for different categories and rules: The category Best Latin Pop Album has been renamed Best Latin Pop Or Urban Album, and Latin Rock, Urban Or Alternative Album has been renamed Best Latin Rock Or Alternative Album

While only debuting in 2020, Peso Pluma was nominated twice and won one Grammy for Best Regional Mexican Music Album (including Tejano) for "Genesis". Pluma also won Billboard Music Award for Top Latin Song Ella Baila Sola, New Artist of the Year in the 2023 Billboard Latin Music Awards.

At the 25th Annual Latin Grammy Awards, Grupo Frontera won Best Norteño Album for “El Comienzo”. Frontera also won Best Regional Song for “El Amor de Su Vida”. This achievement marked a significant milestone in their career and further solidified their presence as a prominent group of talented artists in the Regional Mexican music scene.

== See also ==
- Hot Latin Tracks
- Latin music (genre)
- Latin Pop
- List of best-selling Latin albums in the United States
- Chicano rock
- Music of Puerto Rico
- Latin American culture
