= Que Me Voy A Quedar =

Single by Paulina Rubio

from the album Ananda
- Released: October 12, 2007
- Recorded: 2006
- Studio: Ananda Studios (Miami, Florida)
- Genre: Alternative pop
- Length: 3:20
- Label: Universal Latino
- Songwriters: Coti Sorokin; Julieta Venegas
- Producer: Cachorro López

Paulina Rubio singles chronology
"Ayúdame" (2007)	"Que Me Voy A Quedar" (2007)	"Causa y Efecto" (2009)

Music video
- "Que Me Voy A Quedar" on YouTube

"Que Me Voy A Quedar" (English: "What Am I Going to Keep?") is a song recorded for Paulina Rubio's eighth studio album Ananda (2006). Written by singer-songwriters Coti and Julieta Venegas —with whom Rubio collaborated on the 2005 song “Nada Fue Un Error”—and produced by Cachorro López, it was announced by Universal Latino as the fourth and final single from the album, after “Ni Una Sola Palabra”, “Nada Puede Cambiarme”, and “Ayúdame”.

The music video contains excerpts from the Amor, Luz y Sonido Tour (2007), where the artist can be seen promoting Ananda in different countries around the world. It was produced and directed by Paula Falla, and premiered on her YouTube channel.

Unlike Ananda's first three singles, “Que Me Voy A Quedar” did not receive the same promotion as its predecessors, which meant that the song did not make it onto the music charts. Furthermore, Universal Latino did not send the music video to music channels, and the song was only released in digital format.

== Composition ==
“Que Me Voy A Quedar” was composed with Argentine singer-songwriter Coti and Mexican singer Julieta Venegas, marking their second collaboration with Paulina Rubio since 2005 on the song “Nada Fue Un Error,” which was included on Coti's live album Esta Mañana y Otros Cuentos. It is a pop song with touches of dance music that lyrically speaks about the anguish and anxiety generated by being in an uncertain relationship. Although it is a repetitive melody, it invites reflection on courage, determination, and the process of personal empowerment.

After its release, the Los 40 portal praised the collaboration between Coti, Venegas, and Rubio, stating: “The trio of Coti, Julieta Venegas, and Paulina Rubio has the scent of success, and perhaps for that very reason they decided to join forces again in a song.”

== Music video ==
The music video for “Que Me Voy A Quedar” was directed by Paula Falla, who at the time was a regular collaborator with Paulina Rubio's team. Falla produced and directed the clip, which features several excerpts from the Amor, Luz y Sonido Tour, which the singer took throughout Latin America, the United States, Spain, and other European countries. It premiered on Falla's YouTube channel on October 12, 2007, the same day the single was released.

The Spanish newspaper La Voz de Galicia noted that Rubio gives a nod to her childhood with images that evoke Galician summers. "Galicia is her ‘terra nai,’ as Julio Iglesias would say. Or rather, stepfather's land, since Carlos Vasallo, her mother's (Susana Dosamantes) second husband, had and still has a house in Trasanquelos (Cesuras), where the young Paulina spent several summers," wrote Rubén Ventureira in the aforementioned newspaper.
