= Ananda (album) =

Studio album by Paulina Rubio
- Released: September 18, 2006
- Recorded: August 2005 – June 2006
- Studios: Paulina Rubio's home studio (Miami, Florida)
- Genres: Latin; pop rock; dance; folk; electronic; alternative
- Length: 49:28
- Label: Universal Latino
- Producers: Cachorro López; Toy Hernández; Áureo Baqueiro; Ric Wake; Tricky Stewart; Adrián Sosa; Sacha Triujeque; Gush Montalvo; Gustavo Santaolalla; Eric Sanicola

Paulina Rubio chronology
Pau-Latina (2004)	Ananda (2006)	Paulina Remixes (2007)

Singles from Ananda
- 1. "Ni Una Sola Palabra" Released: July 23, 2006; 2. "Nada Puede Cambiarme" Released: January 18, 2007; 3. "Ayúdame" Released: April 4, 2007; 4. "Que Me Voy A Quedar" Released: October 12, 2007

Ananda (Sanskrit: Bliss) is the eighth studio album by Mexican singer-songwriter Paulina Rubio, released on September 18, 2006, through Universal Latino. Its pop rock music incorporates latin, dance, folk, electropop, alternative and flamenco styles with instrumentation from synthpop beats, guitars, drums, synthesizers, strings and Spanish musical instruments. Its themes range from love, empowerment, and dancing. Contributions to the album's production came from a wide range of producers, including Cachorro López, Rick Wake, Tricky Stewart, Áureo Baqueiro, TOY Hernández and Gustavo Santaolalla. Among the songwriters and artist collaborators appear on the album are Xabi San Martín from La Oreja de Van Gogh, Slash from Guns N' Roses, Juanes, Julieta Venegas and Coti.

Ananda was generally acclaimed by most critics, while Cachorro López received a Latin Grammy nomination for Producer of the Year, and Rubio received a Latin Billboard Music Awards for Female Latin Pop Album given in 2007. The record was also a commercial success, reached at number one in Mexico, and top ten in Spain and Finland. In the United States, Ananda reached at number one on the Billboard Top Latin Albums, and on the Latin Pop Albums; it became her second top 40 album on the Billboard 200 with first week sales of 26,000 copies. It was certified double platinum by the Recording Industry Association of America (RIAA), and sold 250,000 copies in the United States; also was certified double platinum in Spain by the Productores de Música de España (PROMUSICAE) for selling 160,000 copies. In Mexico received the "Tarabu de Oro" for selling 200,000 mastertone sales. To April 2007, it sold over 600,000 copies worldwide.

Four singles were released from the album: "Ni Una Sola Palabra" was released as the lead single, which peaked inside top ten in several countries, and was certified triple platinum in Spain; the consecutive singles, "Nada Puede Cambiarme" and "Ayúdame", met Latin American chart success, while the final single, "Que Me Voy A Quedar" underperformed on the charts. On March 20, 2007 Ananda was reissued as a deluxe edition "by public demand for having more material of the artist". The same day, "Me Siento Mucho Más Fuerte Sin Tu Amor" was released as the only album's digital single. To further promote the album, Rubio embarked on the Amor, Luz y Sonido Tour in February 2007, where she travelled around Europe, North America and South America.

== Background and development ==
After critical and commercial success of her album Pau-Latina (2004), Rubio embarked on an extensive concert tour in support of her record. The Pau-Latina Tour finalized in June 2005, while she announced she would take a break from her career. However, throughout that year, different media reported she was still working on new music, including an album in English, and another in Spanish.

In mid-2005, she participated in Coti's live album, Esta Mañana Y Otros Cuentos, performed the song "Otra Vez" in duet with him, and the smash-hit "Nada Fue Un Error", with the Argentine singer-songwriter, and her compatriot Julieta Venegas. During it time, Rubio began a relationship with Spanish socialite Nicolás "Colate" Vallejo-Nájera. Wanting to distract herself from the media frenzy surrounding this news, she concentrated on the development of her eighth studio album, recording new music for the first time in her house. In her residence in Di Lido Island, Miami Beach, in Florida, Rubio met with different songwriters and music producers to make possible collaborations. While secretly working with different musicians and artists, she catered for her role as a supermodel at New York Fashion Week, and the Gaudi catwalk in Spain.

In March 2006, Rubio's official website announced the pre-production of her eighth studio album. At that time, she had already visualized the concept of the album. In June, she did the photo shoot for the album cover. According to Los 40, Rubio got involved in the creation of the album, "intervening in the exchange of ideas between authors and producers." The radio network's website announced that the name of the album would be Ananda, three days after the release of "Ni Una Sola Palabra", which had already been confirmed as the album's first single. It also confirmed the release date.

== Recording and production ==
The recording sessions were carried out through 18 months, and thirteen songs were selected from the eighty contemplated. The recording process of the album was "spontaneously and naturally", which the songwriters and producers did not set a time to finish it. After receiving her first platinum certification in Spain for Ananda, Rubio said, "this circumstance gave us a lot of freedom, it allowed us not to have schedules and, if there was a good run, we did not have to stop; it has been a reflection of everything we did at our bohemian gatherings." During those months, she meet with several top Latin and international writers and producers, including Xabier San Martín from La Oreja de Van Gogh, Fernando Montesinos, Coti, Eric Sanicola, Gustavo Celis, Julieta Venegas, Juanes, Cachorro López, Gustavo Santaolalla, Toy Hernández, Maria Christensen, Adrián Sosa, Áureo Baqueiro, Tricky Stewart, as well as featuring Guns N' Roses ex-guitarist Slash. With all of them, she created a new and experimental sound for the album.

The vocal parts of the album, as well as most of its creative process and the final photo shoots took place at Rubio's Di Lido Island's (Miami Beach) home, which named Ananda, a word means 'bliss, joy' in Pāli and in Sanskrit, and can also refer to Ānanda, the primary attendant of the Buddha and one of his ten principal disciples. It was designed by her ex-boyfriend, the Spanish architect and socialite Ricardo Bofill Jr, in 2000. In Ananda, the singer set up a compact recording studio "similar to a phone booth", where recorded the songs. It was the first time she used her home studio to record music.

Rubio assured working with album's executive producer, Cachorro López, was tough, but "he has a great notion of every genre within Latin music. He was super strong with me, he demanded too much from me. But the result was worth it." By contrast, she explained that working with Toy Hernández was much more "open" and "free". "I think the vocals and arrangements are very original and fresh. I love working with him. He has a very clear sense of success and music", said. Toy Hernández was one of the first producers to reveal to the media a sneak preview of the singer's new album. In an interview to El Universal, he told the songs under his production were "fundamental" for the album, and "these will have a very urban touch", which "fused with pop", as he usually does with his productions.

In March 2006, Rubio began to make the pre-production of her eighth studio album, having already developed the concept of the album, as well the songs that would be part of it. She made sure each song had "its own personality", inasmuch as "each song and each sound has a story, a justification." She envisioned her eighth studio album as a statement of "young adult, in a period of realization" as woman and artist, and with a notorious cosmic consciousness that is reflected in her as a songwriter, inspired mainly by Kabbalah, and her study of Hinduism and Buddhism.

== Title and artwork ==
I decided on that title because what i wanted to exude was happiness, peace and inspiration.

— Rubio on title of Ananda, Billboard

Rubio and her record label team considered titling the album Rubia, which she thought was a "pun with the last name", but they considered it a cliché; they discarded the idea and called it Ananda, because its same Paulina' house name, where almost the entire album was recorded. The album also takes its title to cite the primary attendant of the Buddha, Ānanda, as she felt it touched on the album "mystical" concept "more free and more fresh." Also, it is a Sanskrit word, a classical language of South Asia, which in English means "happiness".

Sergio Burstein from The Houston Chronicle stated that with the album's title "[Rubio] tries to show her spiritual side, after being considered by some of her detractors as a simple representative of mainstream pop", and did a comparison with the titles of her others records "which has names that referred directly to herself." Jason Birchmeier by AllMusic, opined that the album title is upon "a worldwide movement based on the teachings of Paramhansa Yogananda, a spiritual form of yoga"; while Professor M.J. Alonso Seoane affirmed in his sociological analysis, Buddhism and the Media, that the title and concept of the album "seems to return to the spirit of the 60's and the flower power", however, he was outraged, claiming that Rubio uses Buddhism "as a marketing product."

The artwork was shot by French fashion photographer Lionel Deluy in Rubio's residence in Miami Beach, Florida. The main color in the picture are magenta and shades of gold to reinforce the album's title. Features a close-up shot of Rubio positioned herself in a bold pose while wearing pale make up, with the blonde hair fur on her shoulders. Other pictures from the same shoot serve as the artworks for the "Nada Puede Cambiarme" and "Ayúdame" singles, where Rubio looks "Fresh, relaxed and very sensual."

By reflecting Rubio's spiritual motifs, Ananda is considered a "mystical exploration".

== Music style ==
The standard edition of Ananda is about 49 minutes long, consisting of 13 tracks, while the ITunes Store edition adds a bonus song, "Me Siento Mucho Más Fuerte Sin Tu Amor", as the fourteenth track. Ananda was written and produced by successful Latin artists such as Juanes, Julieta Venegas, Coti, Xabier San Martín from La Oreja de Van Gogh, Toy Selectah, Gustavo Santaolalla and Cachorro López, with additional writing credit of Rubio, on "Ayúdame", "Hoy", "Lo Que Pensamos", and "Tú Y Yo".

=== Composition ===
Ananda is a pop rock genre-spanning record, departing from the predominantly Latin sound of Rubio's previous works. It also incorporates dance-pop genre, what gave Rubio "liberty of playing with different rhythms." According to What's Up Magazine staff, the album is "a mixture of dance floor beats, electric guitars, keyboards and the occasional ranchera/cumbia/pop ballad" so the album swims through intricate Latin and folk instrumentation. Music critic, Jason Birchmeier, reviewing for Allmusic, felt Ananda "was a stretch from the relatively straightforward Latin pop of Paulina", launching "fully embrace" pop-rock. Rhapsody said with dance-pop genre, the album "it's quirkier than we've ever heard it" of Rubio. The artist pointed out that all the songs are autobiographical, and represent a part of her personality. "Each one of the songs is a part of me, the themes I deal with are how I am..... they know Paulina as aggressive, strong, but I also have my sweet side, of tenderness," she said.

In some track, between the start of one song and another, the album includes skits and ambience that reflected everyday moments. Terra described them as "everyday, harmonic sounds" that make "a total listening experience for the listener."

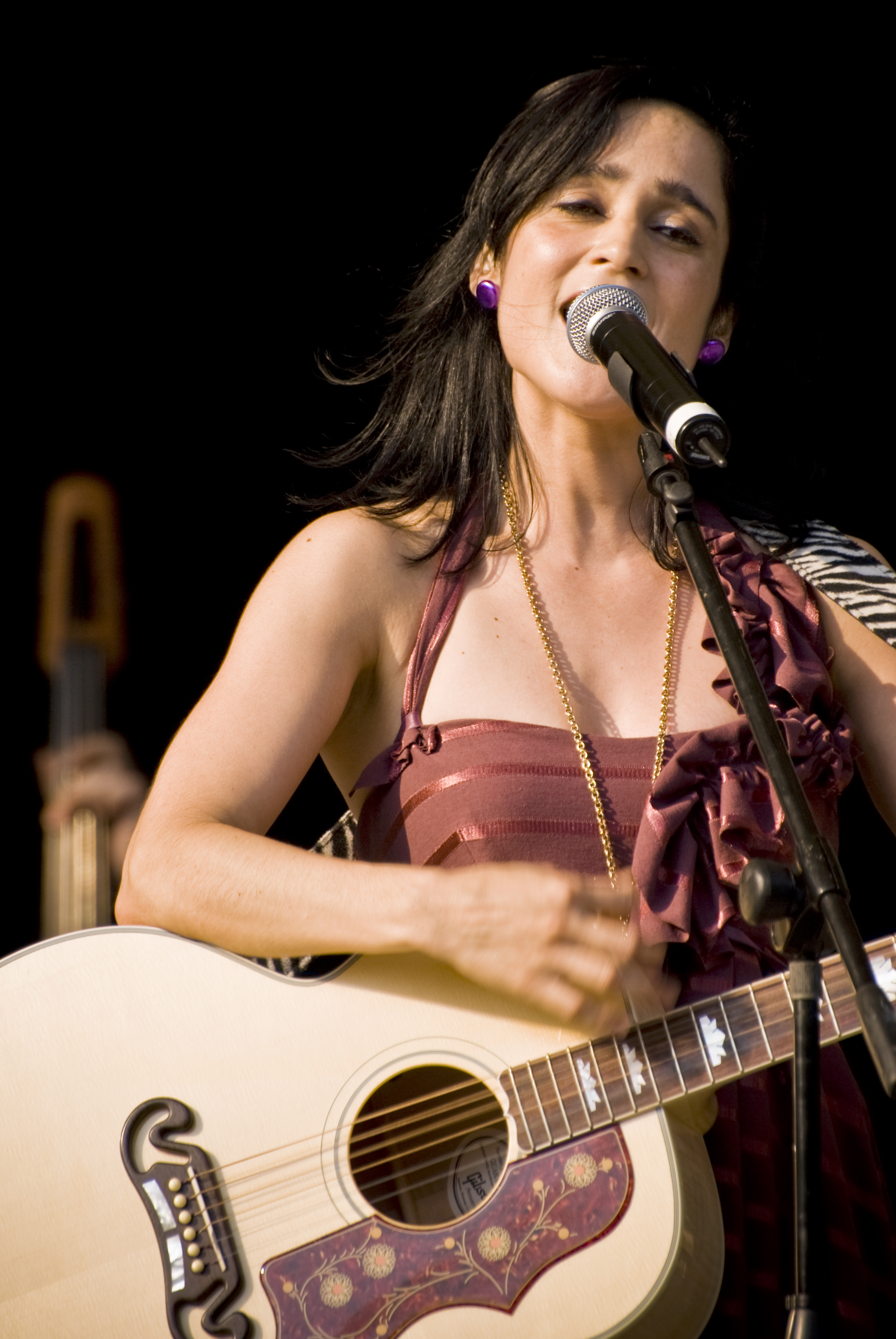
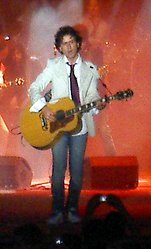
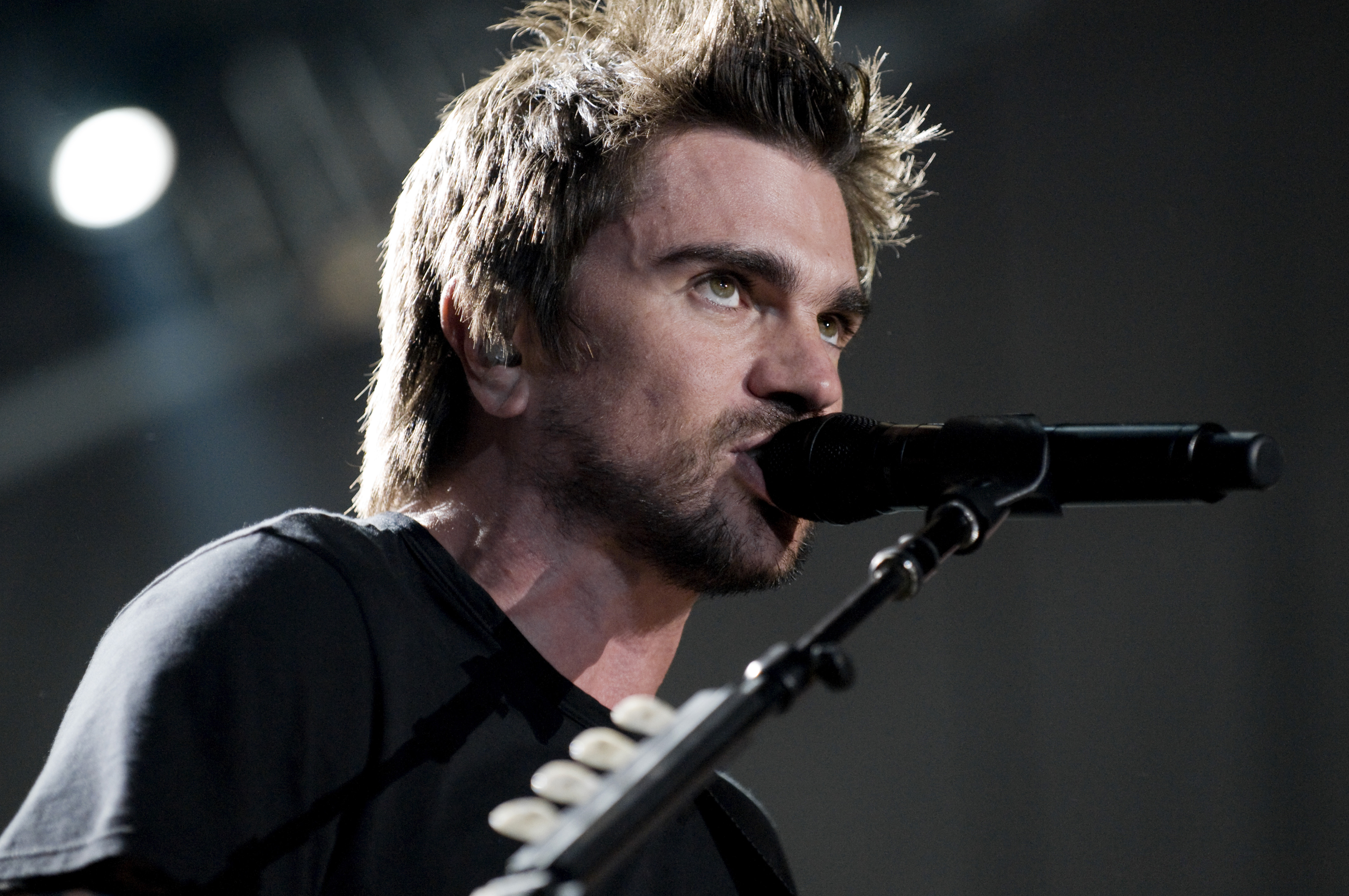
Ananda features contributions from Julieta Venegas, Coti, and Juanes (clockwise).

=== Songs ===
"Ni Una Sola Palabra", the opening track, is an uptempo pop rock tune driven by a "strength of tough guitar-pop", and synth-pop accents with 70's vibes. Its irresistibly new wave chorus give input "Rubio's smoky, expressive voice" over a regular rockbeat. Written by Xabi San Martín from La Oreja de Van Gogh, the song's nostalgic lyrics captures the feelings that persist when love begins to disappear in a relationship, to the extent that nothing is said to each other either with actions or with words. The "hymn" optimistic "Nada Puede Cambiarme" is a pop rock driven by a bouncy arrangement of drums and strongly acoustic and electric guitars, that has Guns N' Roses's Slash on lead guitar. The song describes their positive approach a past love, celebrating herself, despite the breakup.

Written by Paulina Rubio and Coti Sorokin, the third track, "Ayúdame" is a sentimental, indie-influenced, pop rock song, described as a mellow ballad where Rubio's soft vocals serving as a melancholic statement by ask to her lover don't say goodbye. It begins with nostalgic squealing guitars and advances into a climax of whispersed vocals, and harmonies. The fourth track, "N.O." is a pop rock and goth "epic" song that reflects on the tensions about take the next step in a relationship. The narrator questions her lover why he is unwilling to take the risk, while confiding that he will always have her loyalty. "Que Me Voy A Quedar" is a jangle-tinged, pop song, described as a mid-tempo-dance track. The song inspects Rubio's ability to accept a failed relationship and view the experience as a positive. It was written by Coti Sorokin and Julieta Venegas, with whom she collaborated for the song "Nada Fue Un Error" in 2005.

In folk-bolero song "Aunque No Sea Conmigo"—popularized by Celso Piña, Café Tacvba and Enrique Bunbury— Rubio recreates the traditional Mexican song in an upbeat pop rendering. Sings in an erotic tone she is willing to give up her lover, despite still being in love, and wishing him "I hope you are happy" at the cost of her own happiness. Rubio represents the sounds of the "colonia" in a modern production and combines the sounds of Spain and Mexico driven by a trumpet. It has drawn comparisons to her trademark ranchera-hip hop "El Último Adiós" (2000), and the pop-ranchera "Dame Otro Tequila" (2004). "No Te Cambio" is a lovely song that captures the unconditionally love. Its production grows slowly in an acoustic arrangement of finger-plucked strings and flamenco-style vocals, into vallenato rhythms.

The eighth track, "Retrato", is a drowsy Latin pop rock and cumbia song that documents the decision to get away from a narcissistic and vain lover, evoking her through lines "so empty you are, filling you, with your reflection." The power-ballad and alternative rock "Miénteme Una Vez Más" unfolds the emotional pain of a delusional narrator, and metaphorically, she highlights the measures that use her lover to keep her in a toxic relationship, from which she cannot escape. It has drawn comparisons to Evanescence's works by its symphonic rock nature. Rubio performed an English version of the song titled "Beautiful Lie" at the Nobel Peace Prize Concert in Oslo, Norway, played with the Norwegian Radio Orchestra. Also, the song was part of the set list of her Amor, Luz y Sonido Tour.

The followed songs, co-written by Rubio, has a dancefloor production. "Hoy" is a dance-pop "aggressive" song featuring pulsing dance-electro that has a 1970s disco sound. Lyrically, it reflects "being hurt because someone hurts you, and at some point wanting to take revenge." The dance-cut sequel, "Lo Que Pensamos", that opens with enthusiastic whistles and hand claps, lyrically "reveals the chaos that the world lives and we say that armies wear white and that, instead of killing people, make love and peace." By transmit a pacifist and optimistic message, the song is considered the lyrical core of the album, and it fits with the more spiritual concept Rubio wanted to show from Ananda.

The twelfth track, "Tú Y Yo", written by Rubio and Tricky Stewart, is a dance-rock song knitted in expressive gypsy guitar and electro beat. Inspired by a popular Mexican cheer, the song evokes gypsy culture through lines such as "Canto a la gente que está alrededor, la mañana de un día cualquiera (I sing to the people around, the morning of any given day)." The standard edition of the album closes with "Sin Final", a slow ballad with emotionally raw lyrics that detail a flawed but desireting relationship. It opens with a spaghetti Western-esque whistle, and proceeds with folk-style guitars.

== Release and promotion ==
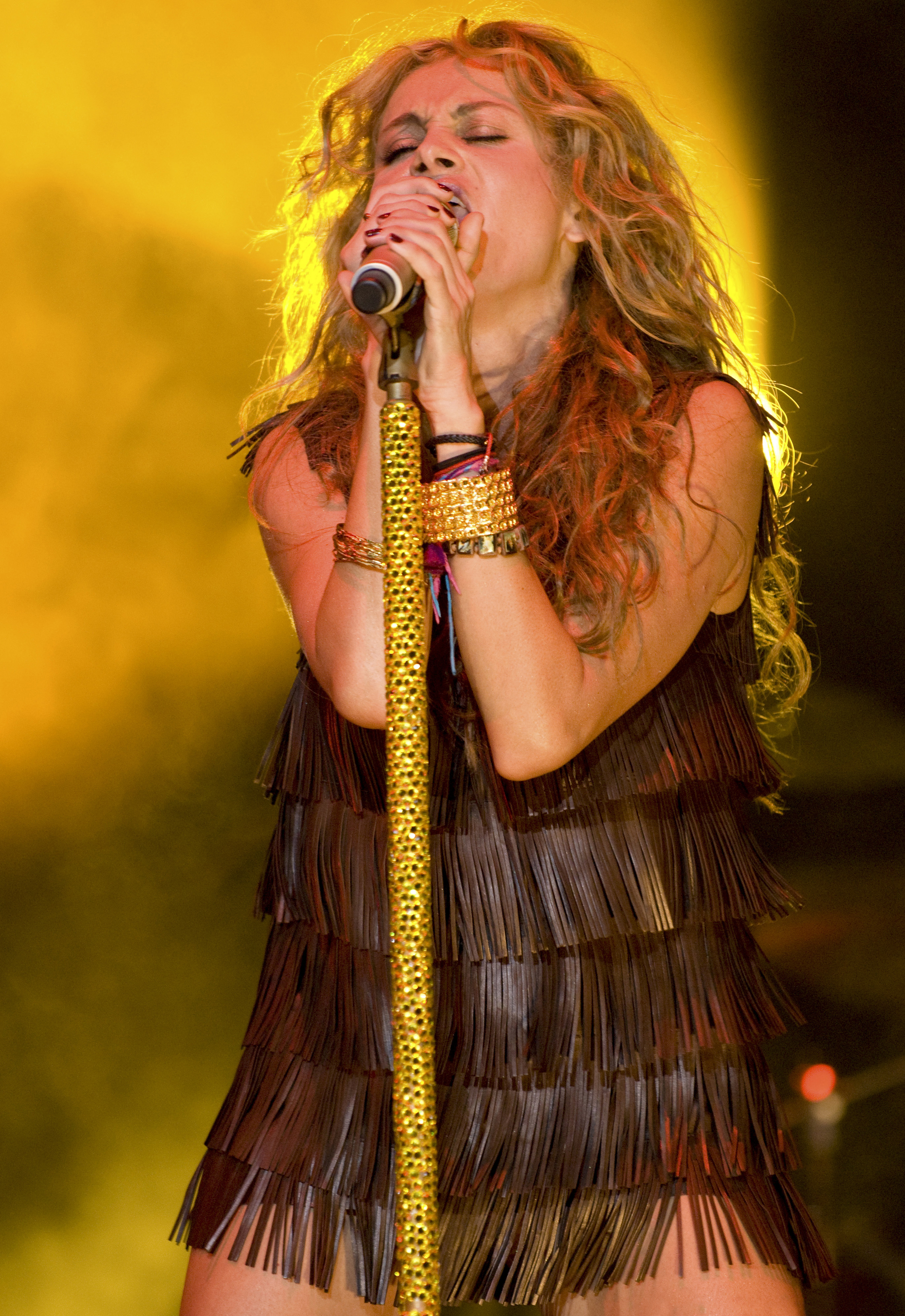
Paulina Rubio performing a live concert at the Asics Music Festival, in Barcelona, as part of her Amor, Luz y Sonido tour

In July 2006, through different media specialized in music, the name of the album and the official release were announced. Ananda was scheduled to be published on September 18 in Mexico and Latin America, but two days before the album's official release date, Mexican stores put the album on sale to avoid piracy; this led the album's leaking that same day. In the United States, the album was released on September 19, 2006.

Rubio went on several television shows in the US to promote the album. On December 6, 2006, she gave an interview and performs on The Tonight Show with Jay Leno inside the NBC Studios in California. It was her first performance on the American TV show in four years. As well, she performed on CD USA, MTV's TRL, a special performs at Universal City for mund2. On December 11, she was one of the artists who performed at the 2006 Nobel Peace Prize concert in Oslo, Norway. She first performed “Ni Una Sola Palabra”, and then an English version of the song “Miénteme Una Vez Más”, entitled “Beautiful Lie”. In both songs she was accompanied by the Norwegian Radio Orchestra. Rubio took advantage of her visit to Norway, where she promoted Ananda, released there at the end of November. She was interviewed by media such as VGTV.

=== Singles ===
"Ni Una Sola Palabra" was released as the lead single from the album on July 24, 2006, by Universal Latino. "Ni Una Sola Palabra" has been praised by contemporary critics. Some compared it with La Oreja de Van Gogh's works, evidencing the influence of the song's composer, Xabier San Martin. "Ni Una Sola Palabra" achieved international success by topping the charts in several countries worldwide. It became Rubio's third number-one single on the US Billboard Hot Latin Songs. At the 2007 Latin Billboard Music Awards, the song was won in the category of Latin Pop Airplay Song of the Year. In Finland, "Ni Una Sola Palabra" peaked at number two on the Suomen virallinen lista, and selling 3,946 copies; while in Spain, selling 60,000 copies, and was certified triple platinum. The music video, directed by Paul Boyd, portrays Rubio as a superhero woman.

"Nada Puede Cambiarme" was released on January 29, 2007, as the second single from the album. It reached at number six on the Billboard Latin Pop Airplay, and number three in Uruguay airplay chart. The song attained top-twenty positions on the charts of many Latin American nations, including countries such as Venezuela and Mexico. In Spain, "Nada Puede Cambiarme" was certified gold. A music video, directed by Dago González, features Slash from Guns N' Roses and Velvet Revolver, shows a glam-rock style wedding, with Rubio portrays a bride. In 2020, the song was listed on ¡Hola! magazine's Most Surprising Duets in Music.

"Ayúdame" was released as the third from the album, on April 4, 2007. The pop rock-ballad song was written by Rubio and Coti; it received positive appreciation from contemporary critics. "Ayúdame" reached the top-twenty on the Billboard Latin Pop Airplay, and it was a success on the Latin American airplay charts. The music video, directed by Gabriel Coss and Israel Lugo, portrays Rubio as an alien on an Earth devastated by global warming.

"Que Me Voy A Quedar" was released as the fourth and final single from the album, on November 13, 2007. The song lost uncharted on the official chart due it wasn't promotional by Universal Latino. A music video was released on Rubio's official website, which contains video footage from her Amor, Luz y Sonido Tour.

"Me Siento Mucho Más Fuerte Sin Tu Amor" —a cover by the Byrds folk rock song, and the lyrics translated into Spanish by Charly García— was released as a digital promotional only single on March 20, 2007. It was a digital single from album's deluxe edition reissue. Around the same time, the promotional single "Hoy" was released on contemporary hit radio. This featured a remixed version of the Mexican rock-dance band Kinky.

== Critical reception ==
Professional ratings
Review scores
Source	Rating
Allmusic	4.5/5 stars
MSN Music	4.5/5 stars

Ananda received generally positive reviews from music critics. La Nación wrote that with this album Rubio "tries to maintain her dominant position in pop". A similar opinion did Jason Birchmeier from AllMusic in her review, saying she "has her career as one of Latin pop's biggest and brightest hitmakers on safe ground." Birchmeier praised it as an album "so enjoyable" and claimed "fully embrace restrained pop/rock, as Rubio does throughout Ananda, is surprising." Joey Guerra from Amazon noted, "the flirty rock-chic vibe suits her and hopefully points to an exciting new direction for Rubio's next studio disc." Panamanian newspaper La Prensa pigeonholed it as a more "experimental" production as opposed to her previous albums, stating that "in addition to adding a spiritual vibe" to the album, "she has taken her electric guitars from rock", making it more evident in "Tú Y Yo" and "Lo Que Pensamos". Rapsody reviewer, Sarah Bardeen, commented that in Ananda "we get to spend more time with Rubio's smoky, expressive voice on lovely songs."

== Accolades ==
"Ni Una Sola Palabra" won for Female Latin Single of the Year and Ananda won for Female Latin Pop Album at the 2007 Latin Billboard Music Awards. Cachorro López was among the producers which nominated for the Producer of the Year at the 8th Annual Latin Grammy Awards for his work in Ananda.

Awards and nominations for Ananda
Year	Award	Category	Nominee(s)	Result	Ref.
2007	Billboard Latin Music Awards	Female Latin Pop Album of the Year	Ananda	Won	
2007	Billboard Latin Music Awards	Female Latin Pop Airplay Song of the Year	"Ni Una Sola Palabra"	Won	

== Commercial performance ==
In the United States, Ananda debuted at number one on the Billboard Top Latin Albums chart with first-week sales of 26,000 copies. It was Rubio's third number-one album there, following Paulina (2000) and Pau-Latina (2004). The album spent 19 weeks on the chart, ultimately earning double platinum (Latin) certification from the Recording Industry Association of America (RIAA) in November, 2006, for shipments in excess of 200,000 copies. Additionally, it also debuted at number one on the Latin Pop Albums chart. It appeared on the year-end Latin album chart on the Top Latin Albums and Latin Pop Albums, at number 41 and number 15, respectively. It charted at number 31 on the Billboard 200, becoming Rubio's second biggest-charted album in the United States, following Border Girl (2002); and the highest debut on the chart for a Rubio Spanish-language album. By March 2007, the album has sold 250,000 units in the US.

In Rubio's native Mexico, Ananda atop on the Mexican Albums Chart on October 10, 2006, just a few days before, it was certified gold by Asociación Mexicana de Productores de Fonogramas y Videogramas (AMPROFON). It appeared on the year-end album chart at number 29. It sold 50,000 copies physicals, while sold 200,000 ringtones and digital copies. In April, 2007 "Tarabú", a music portal and media player developed by Televisa, awarded Rubio with the "Tarabú de Oro" as the artist with the most digital sales, becoming the first artist to receive it award. Ananda peaked at number 15 on the Argentine Albums Chart, and was certified platinum by Argentine Chamber of Phonograms and Videograms Producers in 2007; also was certified platinum in others Latin American territories, like Colombia and Puerto Rico. Ananda was certified gold or platinum in every Spanish-speaking country where it was released.

Ananda debuted and peaked at number two on the Spanish Albums Chart. The album spent 58 weeks on the chart. Within days of release, the Productores de Música de España (PROMUSICAE) certified the album platinum for selling 80,000 copies. It appeared on the Spanish year-end album chart in 2006 and 2007, at number 29 and number 49, respectively. By the time Gran City Pop was released in June 2009, Ananda had sold 160,000 copies, becoming Rubio's second biggest-sold album there, following Paulina (2000). Ananda peaked at number 3 on the Finnish Albums Chart, and stayed there for 11 weeks.

As of December 2006, the album sold 80,000 copies in the United States and more than 500,000 copies worldwide making it Rubio's fastest selling album. As of April 2007, Ananda had sold 600,000 copies worldwide.

== Track listing ==
Ananda – Standard edition
No.	Title	Writer(s)	Producer(s)	Length
1.	"Ni Una Sola Palabra"	Xabi San Martín	Cachorro López	3:44
2.	"Nada Puede Cambiarme"	Fernando Montesinos	Áureo Baqueiro	3:38
3.	"Ayúdame"	Paulina Rubio; Coti	López	3:56
4.	"N.O."	Brooke Ross; Gustavo Celis; Nika García; Eric Sanicola	Rick Wake; Eric Sanicola	3:26
5.	"Que Me Voy A Quedar"	Sorokin; Julieta Venegas	López	3:20
6.	"Aunque No Sea Conmigo"	Alfonso Herrera; Chago Díaz	Toy Hernández; Sacha Triujeque; Gush Montalvo	3:39
7.	"No Te Cambio"	Juanes	Hernández; Triujeque; Montalvo	3:41
8.	"Retrato"	Cachorro López; Sebastian Schon; Sandra Baylac	López	3:13
9.	"Miénteme Una Vez Más"	Maria Christensen; Jonnie Davis; Marc Nelkin; Schon	Wake; Sanicola^{[a]}	3:37
10.	"Hoy"	Adrián Sosa; Rubio^{[b]}	Gustavo Santaolalla; Adrián Sosa; Aníbal Kerpel^{[a]}	3:54
11.	"Lo Que Pensamos"	Rubio; Baqueiro	Baqueiro	3:48
12.	"Tú Y Yo"	Rubio; Christopher Stewart; Marcelo Berestovoy	Tricky Stewart	3:35
13.	"Sin Final"	López; Sebastian Schon	López	5:57
Total length:				49:28

Ananda – US Target edition (bonus track)
No.	Title	Writer(s)	Producer(s)	Length
14.	"Ni Una Sola Palabra" (Don Candiani Reggaeton Remix featuring Trebol Clan)	San Martín	López	3:14
Total length:				52:44

Ananda – iTunes Store edition (bonus tracks)
No.	Title	Writer(s)	Producer(s)	Length
14.	"Me Siento Mucho Más Fuerte Sin Tu Amor"	Gene Clark; Charly García	López	3:09
15.	"Ni Una Sola Palabra" (Music video)			3:48
16.	"Digital booklet - Ananda"
Total length:				56:25

=== Deluxe Edition ===
The reissue Ananda: Deluxe Edition was released on March 20, 2007, by Universal Music Latino nearly six months after the original album. It included three versions of two of the album's singles, a previously unreleased bonus track and a DVD with nearly 50 minutes of never-before seen material. This edition was released in North America only.

Deluxe Edition CD + DVD (CD)
No.	Title	Writer(s)	Producer(s)	Length
1.	"Ni Una Sola Palabra"	Xabier San Martín Beldarían	Cachorro López	3:44
2.	"Nada Puede Cambiarme"	Fernando Montesinos	Áureo Baqueiro	3:38
3.	"Ayúdame"	Paulina Rubio; Coti	López	3:56
4.	"N.O."	Eric Sanicola; Brooke Ross; Gustavo Celis; Nika García	Rick Wake; Eric Sanicola	3:26
5.	"Que Me Voy A Quedar"	Coti; Julieta Venegas	López	3:20
6.	"Aunque No Sea Conmigo"	Chago Díaz; Alfonso Herrera	Toy Hernández; Sacha Triujeque; Gush Montalvo	3:39
7.	"No Te Cambio"	Juanes	Hernández; Triujeque; Montalvo	3:41
8.	"Retrato"	López	Cachorro López; Sebastian Schon; Sandra Baylac	3:13
9.	"Miénteme Una Vez Más"	Maria Christensen; Jonnie Davis; Marc Nelkin; Schon	Wake; Sanicola^{[a]}	3:37
10.	"Hoy"	Adrián Sosa; Rubio^{[b]}	Gustavo Santaolalla; Adrián Sosa; Anibal Kerpel^{[a]}	3:54
11.	"Lo Que Pensamos"	Rubio; Baqueiro	Baqueiro	3:48
12.	"Tú Y Yo"	Rubio; Tricky Stewart; Marcelo Berestovoy	Tricky Stewart	3:35
13.	"Sin Final" (Short Version)	López; Schoon	López	4:30
14.	"Me Siento Mucho Más Fuerte Sin Tu Amor"	Gene Clark; Charly García	López	3:09
15.	"Ni Una Sola Palabra" (Pasito Duranguense Version)	San Martín Beldarían	Alberto "Lion King De León"	3:47
16.	"Ni Una Sola Palabra" (Remix by Belanova)	San Martín Beldarían	Edgar Huerta	4:39
17.	"Nada Puede Cambiarme" (Pasito Duranguense Version)	Fernando Montesinos	"Lion King De León"	3:20
Total length:				1:02:51

Deluxe Edition CD + DVD (DVD)
No.	Title	Length
1.	"EPK Ananda"
2.	"Ni Una Sola Palabra" (Music Video)
3.	"Nada Puede Cambiarme" (Music Video)
5.	"Ni Una Sola Palabra" (Behind The Scenes)
6.	"Nada Puede Cambiarme" (Behind The Scenes)
7.	"Ananda Album Photo Shoot" (Behind The Scenes)
8.	"The Fans" (Behind The Scenes)
9.	"In Málaga, Spain" (Behind The Scenes)

Notes

- Track 6, "Aunque No Sea Conmigo" is a cover of the Mexican musician Celso Piña.
- ^{^a} signifies a co-producer
- ^{^b} signifies a co-songwriter

== Personnel ==
Information is adapted from the album's liner notes.

- Paulina Rubio – vocals, composer
- Xabier San Marín Beldarían – composer
- Slash – guitar (2)
- Fernando Montesinos – composer
- Coti – composer, background vocals (3)
- Eric Sanicola – composer
- Brooke Ross – composer
- Gustavo Celis – composer
- Nika García – composer
- Julieta Venegas – composer
- Juanes – composer
- Chago Díaz – composer
- Sebastian Schon – composer
- Sandra Baylac – composer
- Maria Christensen – composer
- Johnnie Davis – composer
- Marc Nelkin – composer
- Marcelo Berestovoy – composer

- Cachorro López – producer, composer
- Aureo Baqueiro – producer, composer, mixer
- Gustavo Santaolalla – producer, mixer
- Adrián Sosa – composer, mixer
- Tricky Stewart – producer, composer
- Aníbal Kerpel – co-producer, mixer
- Toy Selectah – producer
- Ric Wake – producer
- Sacha Triujeque – producer
- Gush Montalvo – producer
- Peter Mokran – mixer, engineer
- Tony Peluso – mixer, engineer
- Dan Hetzel – mixer, engineer
- Tom Baker – mastering
- Carl Stubner – managing
- Rick Canny – managing
- Lionel Deluy – photography

== Charts ==
=== Weekly charts ===
Chart (2006–2007)	Peak position
Argentine Albums (CAPIF)	15
Finnish Albums (Suomen virallinen lista)	3
Mexican Albums (AMPROFON)	1
Mexican Albums (AMPROFON); Deluxe edition	91
Spanish Albums (Promusicae)	2
US Billboard 200	31
US Top Latin Albums (Billboard)	1
US Latin Pop Albums (Billboard)	1

=== Year-end charts ===
Chart (2006)	Position
Mexican Albums (AMPROFON)	29
Spanish Albums (PROMUSICAE)	29
US Top Latin Albums (Billboard)	41
US Top Latin Pop Albums (Billboard)	15

Chart (2007)	Position
Spanish Albums (PROMUSICAE)	49

== Certifications and sales ==
Region	Certification	Certified units/sales
Argentina (CAPIF)	Platinum	
Colombia (ASINCOL)	Platinum	
Mexico (AMPROFON)	Gold	90,000
Puerto Rico	Platinum	
Spain (Promusicae)	2× Platinum	160,000^{^}
United States (RIAA)	2× Platinum (Latin)	250,000
Summaries
Worldwide	—	600,000
^{^} Shipments figures based on certification alone.

== Release history ==
Release dates and formats for Ananda
Region	Date	Format(s)	Edition	Label	Ref.
Various	September 18, 2006	CD; cassette tape	Standard	Universal Mexico	
United States	September 19, 2006	CD; cassette tape	Standard	Universal Latino	
Ukraine, Russia	December 6, 2006	CD; cassette tape	Standard	Universal Russia	
Various	March 20, 2007	CD; DVD	Deluxe	Universal Latino	

== See also ==
- Sanskrit in pop culture
- List of number-one albums of 2006 (Mexico)
- List of number-one Billboard Top Latin Albums of 2006
- List of number-one Billboard Latin Pop Albums from the 2000s
