= Amor, Luz y Sonido Tour =

2007 concert tour by Paulina Rubio

- Tour by Paulina Rubio
- Associated album: Ananda
- Start date: February 23, 2007
- End date: September 30, 2007
- Legs: 4
- No. of shows: 54

Paulina Rubio concert chronology
- Pau-Latina Tour (2005); Amor, Luz y Sonido Tour (2007); Gran City Pop Tour (2009)

Amor, Luz Y Sonido Tour or (in English) Love, Light & Sound Tour was the third concert tour by Mexican singer Paulina Rubio, in support of her eighth studio album, Ananda (2006). The tour began on 23 February 2007 in Lanzarote, Canary Island at the Campo de Fútbol Arrecife and concluded on 30 September 2007 in Córdoba, Argentina at Orfeo Superdomo, consisting of 14 shows in Europe, 31 in United States and 8 shows in Latin America. It is considered her most extensive tour in Spain.

== Background ==
Rubio revealed she chose the name of the tour, "Amor, Luz y Sonido" or "Love, Light and Sound" (in English) because "represents the bond she and her band share with fans through their music." She called the tour "agile, expressive and aggressive."

== Set list ==
This set list represents the show on the Plaza de Toros La Macarena in Medellín, Colombia.

1. "Ni Una Sola Palabra"
2. "Lo Haré Por Ti"
3. "Todo Mi Amor"
4. "Yo No Soy Esa Mujer"
5. "Algo Tienes"
6. "Baila Casanova"
7. "Sexi Dance" / "I Was Made for Lovin' You" (KISS cover)
8. "Don't Say Goodbye"
9. "No Te Cambio"
10. "Aunque No Sea Conmigo"
11. "Dame Otro Tequila"
12. "El Último Adiós"
13. "My Friend, Mi Amigo"
14. "Hoy"
15. "Perros"
16. "Ayúdame"
17. "Nada Puede Cambiarme"
18. "Te Quise Tanto"
19. "Y Yo Sigo Aquí"

== Tour dates ==
Date	City	Country	Venue	Attendance
Europe
February 23, 2007	Lanzarote	Spain	Campo de Fútbol Arrecife	
February 24, 2007	Santa Cruz	Spain	Plaza de España	
February 25, 2007	Las Palmas	Spain	Estadio Insular	
South America
March 8, 2007	Medellín	Colombia	Plaza de Toros La Macarena	
March 10, 2007	Bogotá	Colombia	Festival Petrobras Música y Energía	50,000
Central America
March 14, 2007	Managua	Nicaragua	Dennis Martínez National Stadium	
March 16, 2007	San Salvador	El Salvador	Centro Internacional de Ferias y Convenciones	
March 17, 2007	Guatemala City	Guatemala	Tikal Futura	
March 25, 2007	San Juan	Puerto Rico	José Miguel Agrelot Coliseum	
March 29, 2007	Santo Domingo	Dominican Republic	Palacio de los Deportes Virgilio Travieso Soto	
North America
March 31, 2007	Orlando	United States	SeaWorld of Florida	
April 1, 2007	Tampa	United States	Busch Gardens Tampa Bay	
Europe
April 20, 2007	Barakaldo	Spain	Bizkaia Arena de Bilbao Exhibition Centre	
April 21, 2007	Castellón	Spain	Plaza de Toros de Castellón	
North America
May 17, 2007	Houston	United States	Escapade 2001	5,900
May 18, 2007	Grand Prairie	United States	Nokia Theatre at Grand Prairie	
May 20, 2007	Atlanta	United States	Fox Theatre	
May 22, 2007	Raleigh	United States	The Ritz	
May 24, 2007	Vienna	United States	Filene Center	
May 25, 2007	Atlantic City	United States	Borgata Event Center	
May 27, 2007	Reading	United States	Sovereign Performing Arts Center	
May 30, 2007	New York City	United States	Beacon Theatre	2,894
June 1, 2007	Mashantucket	United States	Foxwoods Casino	
June 2, 2007	Boston	United States	Opera House	
June 3, 2007	Niagara Falls	United States	Seneca Niagara Event Center	
June 8, 2007	Chicago	United States	Aragon Ballroom	
June 10, 2007	Denver	United States	Paramount Theater	
June 13, 2007	Palm Springs	United States	McCallum Theatre	
June 15, 2007	Reno	United States	Grand Sierra Casino-Grand Theatre	
June 16, 2007	San Jose	United States	San Jose Center for the Performing Arts	
June 19, 2007	Stockton	United States	Bob Hope Theatre	
June 21, 2007	Santa Ynez	United States	Chumash Casino	
June 22, 2007	Fresno	United States	Fresno Convention Center	
June 23, 2007	Los Angeles	United States	Gibson Amphitheatre	
June 26, 2007	Alpine	United States	Viejas Casino	
June 27, 2007	Temecula	United States	The Pechanga Theater	
June 29, 2007	Las Vegas	United States	Pearl Concert Theater	
June 30, 2007	Phoenix	United States	Dodge Theatre	
July 1, 2007	Tucson	United States	Anselmo Valencia Tori Amphitheater	
July 3, 2007	Albuquerque	United States	Tingley Coliseum	
July 5, 2007	San Antonio	United States	Municipal Auditorium	
July 6, 2007	Hidalgo	United States	Dodge Arena	
July 8, 2007	El Paso	United States	El Paso County Coliseum	5,250
Europe
July 12, 2007	Madrid	Spain	Patio del Conde Duque	
July 13, 2007	Burgos	Spain	Estadio El Plantio	
July 14, 2007	Gijón	Spain	Plaza de Toros de El Bibio	
July 18, 2007	Orihuela	Spain	Plaza Glorieta Gabriel Miró	10,000
July 21, 2007	As Somozas	Spain	Campo de Futbol	
July 22, 2007	Vigo	Spain	Castrelos Park	
July 26, 2007	Gandía	Spain	I.E.S. María Enriquez	
July 27, 2007	Montroig del Camp	Spain	Club de Golf Bonmont	
July 30, 2007	Assago	Italy	Mediolanum Forum	
South America
September 28, 2007	Buenos Aires	Argentina	Teatro Gran Rex	
September 30, 2007	Córdoba	Argentina	Orfeo Superdomo	
