= Ayúdame =

Single by Paulina Rubio

from the album Ananda
- Released: April 4, 2007
- Recorded: 2006
- Studio: Ananda Studios (Miami, Florida)
- Genre: Pop rock
- Length: 3:56
- Label: Universal Latino
- Songwriters: Paulina Rubio; Coti Sorokin
- Producer: Cachorro López

Paulina Rubio singles chronology
"Nena" (2007)	"Ayúdame" (2007)	"Que Me Voy A Quedar" (2007)

Music video
- "Ayúdame" on YouTube

"Ayúdame" (English: "Help Me") is a song recorded for Paulina Rubio's eighth studio album Ananda (2006). It was co-written with Argentinian singer-songwriter Coti who Rubio previously collaborated with on his singles "Nada Fue Un Error" and "Otra Vez" the previous year. Also, the track being one of the few songs Rubio has co-written credits on the album.

"Ayúdame" was released on April 4, 2007 as the album's third single, by Universal Latino. The single had moderate success on the charts reaching a peak of number 36 on the Billboard Hot Latin Songs

== Composition ==
"Ayúdame" was written by Paulina Rubio and Coti in Rubio's home-studio, which was set up in Miami, Florida, where other songs (including "Tú Y Yo" and "Lo Que Pensamos") were recorded of Ananda. Musically, is a ballad, pop rock and indie-influenced song. It begins with nostalgic squealing guitars and advances into a climax of whispersed vocals, and harmonies. Although lyrically he talks about asking a romantic interest not to walk away from his life, the theme is a tribute to nature and the feelings of the human being.

== Promotion ==
The song was released as Ananda's third single in early April 2007. Universal Music released "Hoy" as a promotional single for radio at the same time. Both songs were well received by the audience. Rubio performed "Ayúdame" during the Amor, Luz y Sonido Tour in 2007. A few days before the premiere of the music video, on May 29, 2007, she performed the song on MTV Tr3s show Mi TRL in New York. Among the audience were members of the U.S. Navy.

== Music video ==
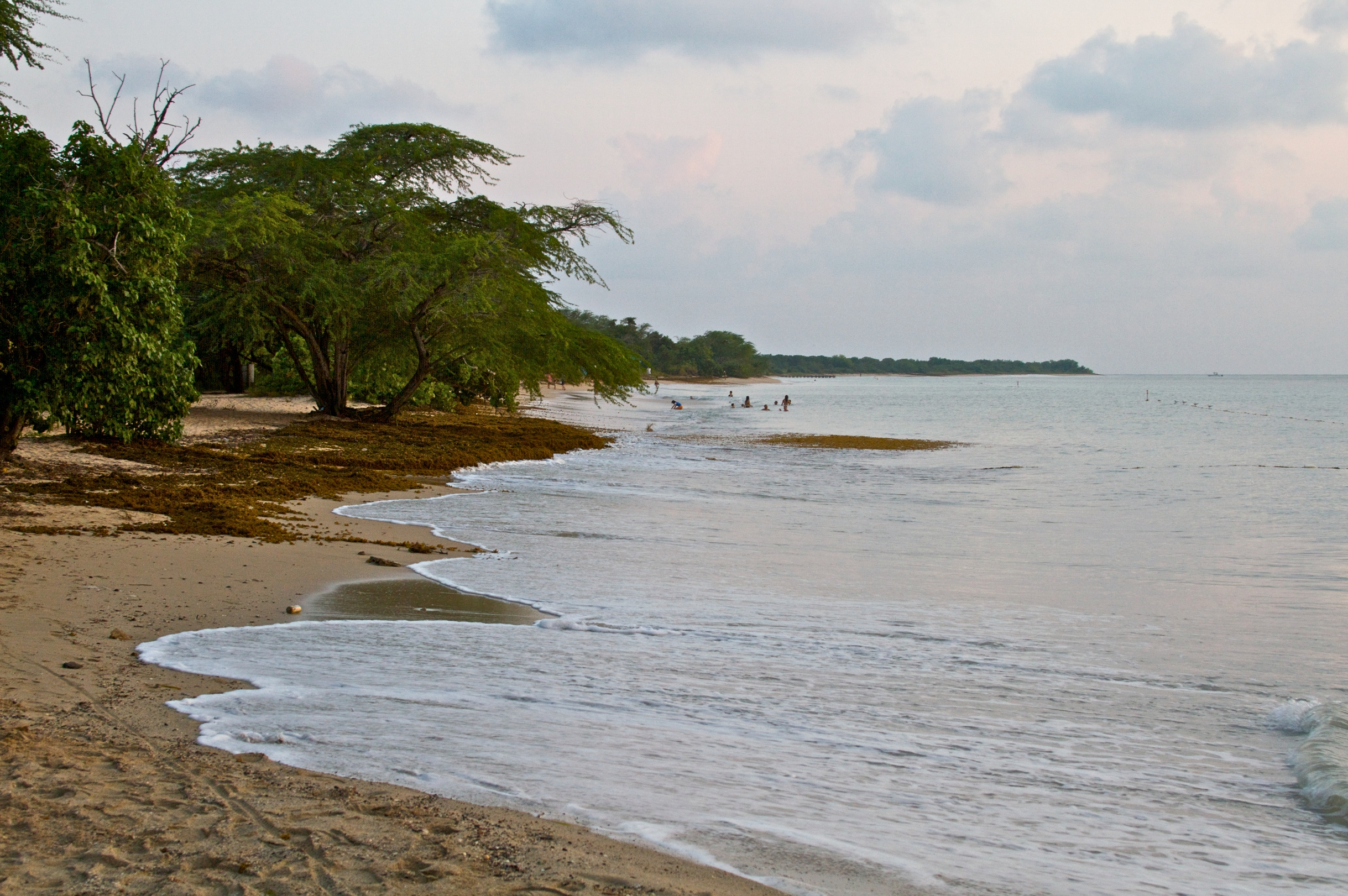
Music video was filmed in Cabo Rojo, Puerto Rico

=== Development and concept ===
The accompanying music video was directed by Israel Lugo and Gabriel Coss and filmed in Cabo Rojo, Puerto Rico. The video was shot in an area "where the sea meets a lush grove of trees that contrasts with semi-desert areas". Rubio was inspired by environmental issues and global warming for the clip. It was premiered on May 30, 2007 on the Ritmoson Latino network. She explained that what she wanted to achieve with the music video is to get "a collective consciousness because I like to participate in all these [environmental] movements, [and do] concerts that have to do with this and other causes."

In the video, Rubio appears singing in an open area with barren trees while meteorites fall from the sky, representing the end of the world, but in the same way, the rebirth of the world, "the new seed". In this sense, an Rubio's alter ego emuling alien visiting an Earth devastated and in ruins. Rubio wears a futuristic-style silicone corset signed by fashion designer José Miró. As the video closes, Rubio heads back to the beach and the planet returns to life as everything turns back to green and animals reappear. The video ends with a Indoamerican proverb that reads: "Only after the last tree has been cut down, and the last river has been poisoned, and the last fish has been caught, will we learn we cannot eat money."

=== Synopsis ===
The video begins with a full shot of Rubio lying on a bed. She is fully dressed in white and a red string, a custom associated with Kabbalah is seen in her wrist. Soon meteorites fall to Earth and an alien (an alter ego of Rubio) emerges in a dry, arid space. Rubio observes that the Earth begins to be hit by the meteors while the alien uses the song's lyric as a poet resource to ask for help. A close-up of a reflective Rubio emerges as the dull rays of sunlight enter her bedroom. She then appears driving her car and arriving at the sea shore, at which point she strips off her clothes and goes for a swim. The alien observes from the same spot, happy that the planet has wildlife again. He climbs a leafy tree that refers to the tree of life.

== Track listing and formats ==
- US CD Single
1. "Ayúdame" – 3:58
- EP
1. "Ayúdame" – 3:58
2. "Ni Una Sola Palabra" – 3:46
3. "Dame Otro Tequila" – 2:49

== Personnel ==
The following people contributed to "Ayúdame":

- Paulina Rubio – lead vocals
- Coti — songwriter
- Cachorro López - production
- Tony Peluso - mixing
- Tom Baker - mastering
- Recorded at Ananda Studios in Di Lido Island, Miami Beach, Florida

== Charts ==
Chart (2007)	Peak position
US Hot Latin Songs (Billboard)	36
US Latin Pop Airplay (Billboard)	11

== Release history ==
Country	Date	Format	Version	Label	Ref.
Various	April 4, 2007	Digital download; CD single; Contemporary hit radio	Original	Universal Latino	
Various	June 19, 2007	Digital download; CD single; Contemporary hit radio	Ayúdame Hit Pack EP	Universal Latino	
