= Adrian Schinoff =

Argentine musician

- Born: Adrian Gonzalo Schinoff Noher; January 7, 1972 (age 54)
- Origin: Rosario, Argentina
- Genre: Latin pop New Flamenco
- Occupations: songwriter, musician, producer
- Website: Facebook page

Adrian Schinoff (born Adrián Gonzalo Schinoff Noher; January 7, 1972) is a musician, producer, and composer. His song "Te Quise Tanto", sung by Paulina Rubio and composed in collaboration with Coti Sorokin, was number one in Top Latin Songs of 2004 and it was awarded by ASCAP at the 13th annual awards in 2005 as The Winner Song in the Pop-Ballad category ASCAP.

== Biography ==
After finishing his studies in music therapy in 1992 in Argentina, he played with the guitarist Luis Salinas, worked with Fabián Gallardo and the rock band Rescate.

In 1998, he moved to Spain to continue his career working as a session musician with, among others, Joaquín Sabina, Marta Sanchez, Julieta Venegas, Coti, M Clan, Carlos Núñez, Chenoa, Nuria Fergó, Chila Lynn, Matias Eisen (Puzzle), while touring with Coti, Hevia, Estopa, Edu y Chipper. Between 2000 and 2004, he worked as a music director for Operación Triunfo (Spain) and Chenoa, he also did demonstrations for Korg.

From 2006, as a result of touring with Niña Pastori, he formed links with several musicians and artists of the New Flamenco genre. He worked with Josemi Carmona and Estrella Morente while touring with Carmen Linares for Blanca Li in 201.0Hhe collaborated with Rosario Flores as musician and producer, and as the music director in the Antonio Carmona tour.

In 2010 he produced the album De Noche by Antonio Carmona together with Gustavo Santolalla and Anibal Kerpel at Capitol Records. A year later he co-produced the single 'Mi Son' by Rosario Flores with Juan Luis Guerra with Antonio Carmona. In 2015 he was the musical director of Pablo Alborán's Tour Terral.

In 2016 he was nominated to a Latin Grammy Award as Mixing Engineer for his work with Spanish Singer/Songwriter Pablo Alborán in the "tres noches en las ventas" album, as best recording of the year.

== Recordings ==
His own recording projects include Adrian Schinoff y los Salvavidas, and Blackdados. Together with the singer Sonia Terol he produced a series of meditation music entitled I Am This. In October 2014 he released the album El Embalao featuring Luis Salinas on guitar.
