= Lionel Deluy =

French photographer

- Born: 15 June 1969 (age 57); Provence, France
- Known for: Photography

Lionel Deluy (born June 15, 1969) is a French fashion photographer, celebrity photographer, and music photographer.

== Life ==
Deluy was born in Salon de Provence, near Marseille, France.

== Work ==
Deluy's work has appeared in every major national and international magazine such as Photo, ELLE, Pavement, Flaunt, Rouge, The Source, VIBE, WIRED, Black and White, Vogue, and GQ Japan. He has shot campaigns for Häagen-Dazs, Reebok, Rampage, Kangol, PF Flyers, Dita Eyewear, Sephora, Thom Browne .

Deluy's photography has been used for the albums of Ray J (All I Feel), Lupe Fiasco (The Cool), Murs (Murs for President), DJ Irene (Royalty), One Block Radius (One Block Radius), Wiz Khalifa ("Say Yeah"), Paulina Rubio (Ananda), Sandra Collins, Ray Cash (Cash on Delivery), The Penfifteen Club (Feel It), Fiona Apple (Extraordinary Machine), Dax Riders.

Actors Deluy has photographed include Ben Foster, Gary Oldman, Kathy Bates, Henry Rollins, Kevin Connelly, Kelly Osbourne, Jeremy Piven, Emily Blunt, John C. Reilly, Denise Richards, Ricky Gervais, Stacey Dash, Kat Von D, Kirk Douglas, Rebecca Romijn, Billy Bob Thornton, Danny Bonaduce, Brittany Murphy, Jimmy Kimmel, Margaret Cho, Tom Green, Lori Petty, Tyrese, Sydney Pollack, Zack Snyder, Gottfried Helnwein, David Lynch, Martin Landau, Julian Schnabel, Roland Joffé, Lina Esco, Christina Ricci, Jessica Alba, Matthew Perry, Jordana Brewster, Dane Cook, Ashton Kutcher, Hugh Hefner, Orlando Bloom, Brittany Snow, James Franco, Ken Watanabe, Paris Hilton, Colin Hanks, Sid Haig, Giovanni Ribisi, Kevin Bacon, Patricia Arquette, Ray Liotta, Jessica Simpson, Angelina Jolie.

Musicians Deluy has photographed include Busta Rhymes, T.I., 50 Cent, Murs, Lil Wayne, The Game, Nikki Sixx, Katy Perry, Ice Cube, will.i.am, Johnny Rotten, Pharrell, Gwen Stefani, Travis Barker, DJ Irene, Lupe Fiasco, Pitbull, Damian Marley, Soulja Boy, 666 Mafia, Sandra Collins, Paulina Rubio, Fiona Apple, Nelly Furtado, Flavor Flav, Outkast, Dax Riders, Mickey Avalon, Trina, Nas, Kelis.

In 2002 Deluy held an exposition on Dita Von Teese in Los Angeles. In 2008, he worked for a year in collaboration with Kat Von D from LA Ink on a book named High Voltage Tattoo- doing all of the photography for the bestselling book.

Deluy has appeared in shows on the MTV and VH1 networks, as well as appearing on Season 9, Episode 4 of America's Next Top Model as a guest judge and photographer.

Deluy now shares his time between, West Hollywood, California and Chinatown, New York City.
