= Mía (Paulina Rubio song) =

Single by Paulina Rubio

from the album Pau-Latina
- Released: April 1, 2005
- Recorded: 2003
- Genre: Pop
- Label: Universal Latino
- Songwriters: Emilio Estefan, Ricardo Gaitán, Alberto Gaitán, Tony Mardini, Tom McWilliams
- Producer: E. Estefan

Paulina Rubio singles chronology
| "Dame Otro Tequila" (2004) | "Mía" (2005) | "Nada Fue Un Error" (2005) |

Audio video
- "Mía" on YouTube

"Mia" (English: Mine) is a song by Mexican pop diva Paulina Rubio from her seventh album Pau-Latina (2004). It was released as the album's fourth and last single in North America and Latin America.

== Background ==
The song was written by Emilio Estefan, who also produced this song, Tom Mc-Williams, the Mexican duo Alberto and Ricardo Gaitán and the American Tony Mardini.

The song was released in April 2005 and got much attention due to its masculine lyrics. However, it quickly entered the charts and peaked #8 at Hot Latin Tracks and #5 at Latin Pop Airplay. To Paulina herself and her fans, this song is considered as her best ballad song in her career with Universal Latino.

== Music video ==
At the beginning, the public could not imagine the official video of "Mia" because the song had masculine lyrics and was supposed to be sung by a man. But when the video came out unexpectedly, it showed a cooler and fallen in love Paulina Rubio.

During the video shooting Paulina said: - "I think the video is a visual image that goes far beyond, perhaps the song can say some lyrics, but what you're looking at can be completely another."-.

The video really has no story. But what the Argentinian director Piko Talarico tried to make was the reflection of a person in the mirror who has different readings. However, although the video was somehow difficult to convey to the public, it achieved wide acceptance by viewers.

== Charts ==
| Chart | Peak position |
|---|---|
| US Hot Latin Songs (Billboard) | 8 |
| US Latin Pop Airplay (Billboard) | 5 |
