= Pavement (magazine) =

New Zealand-culture magazine

- Cover (cropped) of the June/July 2003 issue, with Devon Aoki by Lionel Deluy
- Editor: Bernard McDonald
- Creative director: Glenn Hunt
- Categories: Youth culture
- Frequency: Bimonthly, later quarterly
- Total circulation: 89,000 (2006)
- Founder: Bernard McDonald, Glenn Hunt
- Founded: 1993
- Final issue Number: Summer 2006/2007; 74
- Country: New Zealand
- Based in: Auckland
- Language: English
- ISSN: 1173-0625

Pavement (stylised in all caps) was a New Zealand youth culture magazine founded in 1993 by journalist Bernard McDonald and art director Glenn Hunt. After 13 years defining a generation, the magazine ceased publication in 2006 following a decline in advertising and a changing media landscape.

At the time of closure the magazine was distributed nationwide across New Zealand and Australia, along with limited distribution in London, Los Angeles, New York City, and Paris.

== Background ==
Based in Auckland, New Zealand, Pavement quickly established itself globally as an innovative popular culture title, garnering a reputation for original and exclusive content showcasing both emerging talent and featuring top international names.

Originally published six times per year as a bi-monthly in 2004 the magazine changed to a more substantial quarterly publication.

Magazine cover stars included Naomi Campbell (who posed free of charge), Johnny Depp, Kirsten Dunst, Trish Goff, Shalom Harlow, Ethan Hawke, Paris Hilton, Kylie Minogue, Viggo Mortensen, Anna Paquin, Christy Turlington, and more.

During its existence it was twice awarded New Zealand Magazine of the Year as well as Editor of the Year, Designer of the Year and Advertising Executive of the Year.

=== Readership ===
At the time of closure in 2006 the magazine had a readership of 89,000.

=== Editor ===
Editor	Start year	End year
Bernard "Barney" D. McDonald	1993	2006

== History ==
Pavement was launched in 1993 by journalist Bernard "Barney" M. McDonald. McDonald came up with the idea for the magazine but needed someone to steer its design aesthetic and fashion content. Upon hearing about the new magazine, Hunt saw the potential and approached McDonald to join the publication as art director, going on to partner as co-publisher and creative director.

The first issue had a print run of 5,000 copies and was on newsprint, largely in black and white.

Whilst production of the magazine mainly took place in New Zealand it made use of overseas stylists, models, writers, and photographers. In the early years these were mainly New Zealand and Australian however later included Helmut Newton, Lionel Deluy, Terry Richardson, and more. The magazine was also notable for discovering and spring-boarding new talent launching many a successful career in the process, including some of New Zealand's top models.

One of Gisele Bündchen first photoshots was for the magazine in December 1997. The editorial was shot in New York City by Regan Cameron.

The magazines advertising revenue peaked with its Spring 2005 issue. However by late 2006 advertising had dropped, forcing the magazine to close.

=== Special teen issue and other reports ===
The second to last issue published in October 2006, entitled the "special teen issue" and subtitled "Lost Youth". The issue marked the magazines 13th anniversary of publication and was critisced by ECPAT who lodged a complaint with the censorship compliance unit. The complaint claimed that images of teen girls and one 10-year old were "legally objectionable". Editor Bernard McDonald said that the 10-year old was not sexualised "just as Anna Paquin was not sexualised when she appeared in the very adult film The Piano". The controversy led to bookstore chain Whitcoulls making the issue available only on request. The Office of Film and Literature Classification gave the issue a restriction to persons 13 years of age and over, however by the time the issue was classified it had sold out.

Chief Censor, Bill Hastings felt there was a prima facie case to be answered, however, no action was taken and Pavement was cleared of any wrongdoing.

The magazine had previously been reported to the censorship board for its February/March 1999 "Raw Talent" issue, which included a photo by Terry Richardson of a Japanese prostitute in a schoolgirl uniform; the issue was given an R16 restriction. Two further issues "Au Natural (February/March 2003)" and "69" (Spring 2005) were submitted to the censor however were not deemed offensive.

=== Closure ===
In November 2006 the editor Barney McDonald announced that following the magazine would cease publication with the Winter 2006/07 issue, that issue featured Amber Sainsbury on the cover. McDonald citied the drop in advertising revenue saying that there was not enough money to keep the magazine running. Following the announcement The New Zealand Herald said that "[New Zealand] youth culture is set to lose its... ambassador".

=== 2018 claims of impropriety ===
In the wake of the MeToo movement, The Spinoff published the accounts of three anonymous women who had claims of drug abuse, sexual harassment, and other inappropriate behaviour supposedly committed by Pavement staff. After its publication, former editor, Barney McDonald dismissed the statements and stated that none of the Pavement team used the magazine to be predatory towards young women.
