= Salamandra (album) =

Studio album by Miguel Bosé
- Released: May 20, 1986
- Genre: Latin pop
- Length: 38:30
- Languages: Spanish; English
- Labels: WEA Latina; WEA International
- Producer: Celso Valli

Miguel Bosé chronology
Bandido (1984)	Salamandra (1986)	XXX (1987)

Singles from Salamandra
- 1. "Aire Soy" Released: 1986; 2. "Nena" Released: 1986; 3. "Partisano" Released: 1986; 4. "Salamandra" Released: 1986; 5. "Amapola Besame" Released: 1986

Salamandra (English: Salamander) is the eighth studio album Spanish musician and actor, Miguel Bosé, and his first with Warner Bros. Records (Warner Music Latina in the U.S.). It was released in May 1986 in Spain, but not until 1989 in the U.S.

== Track listing ==
No.	Title	Writer(s)	Length
1.	"Nena"	Elio Aldrighetti; Miguel Bosé; Vittorio Leoravante	4:51
2.	"Salamandra"	Piero Ameli; M. Bosé	4:03
3.	"Aire Soy"	M. Bosé; Riccardo Giagni	4:16
4.	"You Live In Me"	Mike Ogletree; R. Giagni	4:08
5.	"Amazonas"	Andrea Fornili; Gianfranco Fornaciari; M. Bosé	4:40
6.	"Todo Un Hombre"	A. Fornili; G. Fornaciari; M. Bosé	4:25
7.	"Cuanto El Tiempo Quema"	M. Bosé; R. Giagni	4:06
8.	"Partisano"	M. Bosé; R. Giagni	4:17
9.	"Amapola Besame"	Carlos Berlanga; M. Bosé	3:36

== Charts ==
Chart performance for Salamandra
Chart (1986)	Peak position
Italian Albums (Musica e dischi)	17
