= Pau-Latina =

Studio album by Paulina Rubio
- Released: February 10, 2004
- Recorded: April–December 2003
- Genre: Latin pop
- Length: 54:17
- Label: Universal Latino
- Producers: Chris Rodríguez; Marzello Acevedo; Emilio Estefan; Toy Hernández; Sasha Triujeque; Sergio George; Marteen; Richard Vission

Paulina Rubio chronology
Border Girl (2002)	Pau-Latina (2004)	Mio: Paulina Y Sus Éxitos (2006)

Singles from Pau-Latina
- 1. "Te Quise Tanto" Released: December 22, 2003; 2. "Algo Tienes" Released: May 17, 2004; 3. "Dame Otro Tequila" Released: August 23, 2004; 4. "Mia" Released: April 1, 2005

Pau-Latina is the seventh studio album by Mexican singer Paulina Rubio, released on February 10, 2004, by Universal Latino. Musically, Rubio wanted to make a "futuristic folk" or a "cocktail of different music genres", thus incorporating eclectic latin music in its sound with instrumentation from techno beats, guitars, drums, synthesizers, strings and Spanish guitars musical instruments. Its themes range from love, dancing, friendship and feminist. Contributions to the album's production came from a wide range of producers, including Emilio Estefan, Chris Rodríguez, Toy Hernández, Marcello Acevedo and Sergio George.

Upon its release, the album received generally favorable reviews from music critics, who complimented its production and they considered it as the "follow-up" of her album Paulina (2000). Pau-latina debuted atop the Latin Albums Billboard charts in the United States, and was certified double Latin Platinum by the Recording Industry Association of America (RIAA). The album sold at least 500,000 copies worldwide, making Rubio the best-selling Latin artist of 2004.

Four singles were released from the album. It became Rubio's most successful era in the US Latin charts, being her first album to score four top-ten singles on the US Billboard Hot Latin Songs, with "Te Quise Tanto", "Algo Tienes", "Dame Otro Tequila" and "Mía", two of these peaking at numbers one. Rubio promoted the album with television performances and the Pau-Latina Tour.

== Background and production ==
Rubio first expressed her intent to re-record an "entire album in Spanish" at the Spanish press release of her first and only English album to date, Border Girl, in June, 2002. She also revealed she wanted to collaborate with Manu Chao and Armando Manzanero, who composed the ballad "Tal Vez, Quizá", for her fifth studio album, Paulina (2000). Jorge Villamizar, lead member of Bacilos, told Billboard in September 2003, he co-wrote a track with her wife, Sandra Uribe, for Rubio's upcoming album. He revealed the name of the song: "Perros", and said the singer record it in English and Spanish. In January 2004, a month before the album's release, Argentine composer Ferra announced she and Reyli Barba wrote Rubio a song called "Amor Secreto", "a bolero, and the story is tender, very romantic. The song was chosen by Paulina and adaptations were made to it that she suggested."

Pau-Latina marks Rubio's return to the Spanish-language market after her English debut album. For the production of the album, she collaborated with songwriters and producers Chris Rodríguez, M. Benito, Andrés Levin, Ileana Padrón, Coti, Marco Antonio Solís, Jorge Villamizar, Emilio Estefan, Ricardo Gaitán, Alberto Gaitán, Reyli, Tim Mitchell, Claudia Brant, and Richard Vission. Also, it is the second time, since Planeta Paulina, that Rubio participates as a songwriter in three of the album's tracks: "My Friend, Mi Amigo", "Baila Que Baila" and "Dame Tu Amor".

== Promotion ==
Pau-Latina was released on 10 February 2004. The cover art of the album, as well as other promotion shoots, show Rubio covered in intense colors such as Mexican pink, red, orange and purple. She wears folklore skirts, a rose pin in her blonde hair, and shiny rings. Rubio showed a style that highlights her roots as a Latin woman, although she added glamor to her outfits.

=== Singles ===
"Te Quise Tanto" was released on December 22, 2003 as the lead single from Pau-Latina. Universal Latino moved up the release date because the song was illegally leaked on the Internet. It garnered critical acclaim, with Rubio's fresh vocal interpretation delivery receiving particular praise. Commercially, the single was a success, peaking atop the US Billboard Hot Latin Tracks, becoming Rubio's most successful singles to date, which spent six non-consecutive weeks at number one. It also peaked inside the top five in Mexico, Colombia and Venezuela.

"Algo Tienes" was released as the second single on May 17, 2004. Critics praised its dance-pop-friendly sound and hooks. In the United States, the song peak at number one on the US Billboard Latin Pop Songs, however, it peaked at number four on the Hot Latin Songs. As well, the song peaking number one in Mexico charts. The promotional releases, "Ojalá" and "Perros", became very successful in Latin American charts, peaking at number eleven and number fourteen, respectively, in Paraguay airplay chart.

"Dame Otro Tequila" was released as the third and final single on August 23, 2004. It received positive reviews from critics, some of whom praised its Ranchera nature and Rubio's vocals. The song was a success peaking at number one on the US Billboard Hot Latin Songs. "Mía" was released as the fourth and last single from the album in April 2005. The song was a moderate commercial success, peaking at number eight on the US Billboard Hot Latin Songs.

== Critical reception ==
Professional ratings
Review scores
Source	Rating
Apple Music	favourable
AllMusic	3.5/5 stars
Billboard	(positive)

The album received generally positive reviews from music critics. AllMusic editor Johnny Loftus viewed that "throughout Pau-Latina, there's an alluring scratchiness to Rubio's voice.", then compared the beats to Border Girl's and said "is sure to please fans of 2000's Paulina. Leila Cobo of Billboard also praised Rubio's voice, assuring it is "thin and raspy but thoroughly convincing.", she said Pau-Latina "blends a variety of Latin rhythms and pop beats for an overall effect that's fun but not facile", calling the album like the "follow-up" of Paulina as "feel-good pop." Rapsody reviewer Sarah Bardeen considered the album "brilliant" because "Rubio incorporates elements of rap, reggaeton, flamenco and ranchera while maintaining her own consistently feathery pop sensibility." Likewise, Matt Cibula from PopMatters called it as a "fractured fairytale pop from some dimension where everyone gets laid all the time and no one is ever sad." Included it in her "best however-many-it-ends-up-being albums of 2004" list.

The album was nominated for a Latin Grammy Award in 2004 for Best Female Pop Vocal Album, and a Grammy Award for Best Latin Pop Album in 2005.

== Commercial performance ==
Pau-Latina was number one in sales in Mexico as well as the U.S. on the Billboard Top Latin Albums chart. In Rubio's native Mexico, Pau-Latina entered and peaked at number one on the albums chart. One month after its release, it received certified gold on March 10, 2004, for shipments of 50,000 copies. The Asociación Mexicana de Productores de Fonogramas y Videogramas(AMPROFON) certified the album platinum, and sold 100,000 units in the country. In the United States, the album debuted at number one on the Billboard Billboard Top Latin Albums chart. It remained inside the top 10 for many weeks. Pau-Latina was certified double-platinum by the Recording Industry Association of America (RIAA) on March 16, 2004. In April 2004, Rubio received her first certifications from the United States and Mexico, platinum and gold record, respectively, in Miami for selling 400,000 copies three months after the launch of Pau-Latina. In Ecuador, the album sold 19,000 copies through Bellsouth

== Track listing ==
No.	Title	Writer(s)	Length
1.	"Algo Tienes"	Chris Rodríguez, Manny Benito	3:07
2.	"My Friend, Mi Amigo"	Paulina Rubio, Andrés Levin, Ileana Padrón	3:31
3.	"Te Quise Tanto"	Coti, Andahí, Adrian Schinoff	4:05
4.	"Baila Que Baila"	T. Méndez, E. Pérez, José de Jesús, Paulina Rubio, Tea Time	3:36
5.	"Ojalá"	Marco Antonio Solís	3:28
6.	"Perros"	Jorge Villamizar, Xandra Uribe	3:49
7.	"Quiero Cambiarme"	Emilio Estefan, Ricardo Gaitán, Alberto Gaitán, Nicolás Tovar	2:20
8.	"Mía"	Emilio Estefan, Ricardo Gaitán, Alberto Gaitán, Tony Mardini, Tom McWilliams	3:33
9.	"Alma En Libertad"	Jorge Villamizar, Juan Carlos Pérez-Soto	3:54
10.	"Adiosito Corazón"	Jorge Villamizar	3:12
11.	"Amor Secreto"	Reyli	4:12
12.	"Volverás"	Angie Chirino, Tim Mitchell, Clay Ostwald	5:06
13.	"Dame Otro Tequila"	Emilio Estefan, Ricardo Gaitán, Alberto Gaitán, Tony Mardini, Tom McWilliams	2:48
14.	"Dame Tu Amor"	Paulina Rubio, Claudia Brant, Richard Vission, G. Brown, A. Cee	3:52
15.	"Algo Tienes" (Instrumental, hidden track)	Chris Rodríguez, Manny Benito	7:28

== Personnel ==
Gaitán Bros Ricardo Gaitán & Alberto Gaitán — producer, arranger, programming, background vocals, engineers & composers
Archie Peña — producer
Sebastian Krys — mixing
Sergio George — keyboards, drum programming, producer
Marteen — producer
Tom Coyne — mastering
Javier Garza — engineer
Marcello Azevedo — guitar, bajo sexto, arranger, producer, keyboards
Jorge González — engineer
Alfred Figueroa — engineer, mixing
Bob "Bassy" Bob Brackmann — mixing
Toy Hernández — producer, engineer
Tony Mardini — engineer, mixing
Felipe Tichauer — engineer
Tea Time — rap
Mike Weitman — mixing assistant
Max Kolibe — engineer
Sacha Triujeque — producer, engineer

Chris Rodríguez — arranger, producer, programming
Frank Maddocks — graphic design, art direction
Javier Carrión — engineer
Steven Sunset — engineer
Richard McLaren — photography
Tata Bigorra — coros
Jake R. Tañer — engineer
Danita Ruiz — management
Caresse Henry — management
MC Wave — rap
César Nieto — DJ
Paulina Rubio — executive producer
Carlos Alvarez — engineer
Hal Batt — engineer
Scott Canto — engineer
Emilio Estefan — didgeridoo, producer

== Charts ==
=== Weekly charts ===
Chart (2004)	Position
Argentine Albums (CAPIF)	5
Spain albums (Promusicae)	14
US Top Latin Albums (Billboard)	1
US Latin Pop Albums (Billboard)	1
US Billboard 200	105

=== Year-end charts ===
Chart (2004)	Peak position
US Billboard Latin Albums	6
US Billboard Latin Pop Albums	3

== Certifications and sales ==
Region	Certification	Certified units/sales
Ecuador	—	19,000
Mexico (AMPROFON)	Platinum	100,000^{^}
Spain (Promusicae)	Gold	50,000^{^}
United States (RIAA)	2× Platinum (Latin)	200,000^{^}
Summaries
Worldwide	—	500,000
^{^} Shipments figures based on certification alone.
