= Nena (song) =

1986 single by Miguel Bosé

Single by Miguel Bosé

from the album Salamandra
- Released: 1986
- Recorded: 1985
- Genre: Pop
- Length: 4:51
- Songwriters: Miguel Bosé, E. Aldrighetti, V. Ierovante

Miguel Bosé singles chronology
"Aire Soy" (1986)	"Nena" (1986)	"Partisano" (1987)

"Nena"

Single by Miguel Bosé featuring Paulina Rubio

from the album Papito
- Released: January 29, 2007
- Recorded: 2006
- Genre: Pop
- Length: 4:18
- Songwriters: Miguel Bosé, E. Aldrighetti, V. Ierovante

Miguel Bosé singles chronology
"Corazones" (2004)	"Nena" (2007)	"Si Tu No Vuelves" (2007)

Paulina Rubio singles chronology
"Nada Puede Cambiarme" (2007)	"Nena" (2007)	"Ayúdame" (2007)

"Nena" (Spanish for "Baby") is a song released as a single in 1986. It was written by Miguel Bosé, E. Aldrighetti, and V. Ierovante, and was included on Bose's studio album Salamandra.

== Miguel Bosé and Paulina Rubio version ==
The same song was re-recorded, including Mexican singer Paulina Rubio and was released as the first single from Bosé's album Papito. This new version was produced by Carlos Jean.

On August 29, 2007 this new version received a Latin Grammy nomination for Record of the Year.

== Charts ==
=== Solo ===
Chart (1987)	Peak position
US Hot Latin Songs (Billboard)	48

=== with Paulina Rubio ===
Chart (2007)	Peak position
US Hot Latin Songs (Billboard)	27
US Latin Pop Songs (Billboard)	6
Venezuela (Record Report)	7

== Certifications ==
Region	Certification	Certified units/sales
Spain (Promusicae)	Platinum	20,000^{*}
Spain (Promusicae) Ringtone	Gold	10,000^{*}
^{*} Sales figures based on certification alone.
