= Te Quise Tanto =

Single by Paulina Rubio

from the album Pau-Latina
- Released: December 22, 2003
- Recorded: 2003
- Genre: Latin pop
- Length: 4:05
- Label: Universal Latino
- Songwriters: Coti Sorokin; Andahí; Adrian Schinoff
- Producer: Emilio Estefan

Paulina Rubio singles chronology
"When You Say Nothing At All" (2003)	"Te Quise Tanto" (2003)	"Algo Tienes" (2004)

Music video
- "Te Quise Tanto" on YouTube

"Te Quise Tanto" (English: I Loved You So Much) is a song by Mexican singer Paulina Rubio from her seventh studio album Pau-Latina (2004). It was released as the lead single from the album by Universal Latino on December 22, 2003. The song was written by Coti Sorokin, Andahí and Adrian Schinoff, and produced by Emilio Estefan Jr. "The Quise Tanto" is a Latin pop and pop rock song in which Rubio expresses how difficult it is to forget a lover.

Upon its release, "Te Quise Tanto" received positive reviews from music critics. At the 13th ASCAP Awards, the song winner in the category of "Latin Pop-Ballad". Commercially, it was a success and peaked on the Billboard Hot Latin Tracks in the United States for six non-consecutive weeks, the longest stay at the summit by the singer in that chart to date.

In 2024, Cadena Dial included it in its list of "the 20 best songs released in 2004".

== Promotion ==
Paulina performed the song at the 2004 Latin Billboard Awards.

== Chart performance ==
In the United States, "Te Quise Tanto" becoming Rubio's first number one single on the Billboard Hot Latin Tracks chart; it spent a total of six weeks at the top position, while also reaching number one on the Latin Pop Airplay. The song managed to peak at number five on the Bubbling Under Hot 100 chart. Also, as of December 11 of 2009, "Te Quise Tanto" became the 72nd most played song of the past decade amongst the top 100 most popular songs from Billboards, Latin Pop Songs charts. The song peaked within the top 5 on singles charts of Colombia (2), Chile (5) and Venezuela (2).

== Music video ==
A music video was shot by Gustavo Garzón, and it was filmed in December 2003 in Los Angeles. The clip has a cartoonish aesthetic, psychedelic figures and Rubio's timeless glamour. It premiere in January 20, 2004.

== Formats and track listing ==
CD single

1. Te Quise Tanto (Radio Edit) – 3:19
2. Te Quise Tanto (Original Version) – 3:58

Remixes

1. Te Quise Tanto (DJ Hessler 3am Extended Mix) – 6:26
2. Te Quise Tanto (DJ Hessler Trance Extended Mix) – 5:06
3. Te Quise Tanto (DJ Hessler 4am Disco Extended Mix) – 6:26
4. Te Quise Tanto (D'Menace Club Mix) – 6:10
5. Te Quise Tanto (DJ Hessler 3am Disco Radio Mix) – 3:53
6. Te Quise Tanto (DJ Hessler Trance Radio Mix) – 3:31
7. Te Quise Tanto (DJ Hessler 4am Disco Radio Mix) – 3:52
8. Te Quise Tanto (D'Menace Radio Mix) – 3:47
9. Te Quise Tanto (Salsa Mix) – 3:13
10. Te Quise Tanto (Original Version) – 4:05

US 12" promo vinyl

1. A1 Te Quise Tanto (DJ Hessler 3am Extended Mix) – 6:26
2. A2 Te Quise Tanto (DJ Hessler 4am Disco Extended Mix) – 6:26
3. A3 Te Quise Tanto (DJ Hessler Trance Extended Mix) – 5:06
4. B1 Te Quise Tanto (D'Menace Club Mix) – 6:02
5. B2 Te Quise Tanto (Salsa Mix) – 3:47

== Charts ==
=== Weekly charts ===
Chart (2004)	Peak position
Chile (Notimex)	5
Colombia (Notimex)	2
Mexico (Reforma)	2
US Bubbling Under Hot 100 (Billboard)	5
US Hot Latin Songs (Billboard)	1
US Latin Pop Airplay (Billboard)	1
US Tropical Airplay (Billboard)	3
US Regional Mexican Airplay (Billboard)	23
Venezuela (Notimex)	2

=== Year-end charts ===
Chart (2004)	Peak position
US Hot Latin Songs (Billboard)	2
US Latin Pop Airplay (Billboard)	2

== See also ==
- List of number-one Billboard Hot Latin Tracks of 2004
