= Luis Salinas =

Argentine jazz guitarist (born 1957)

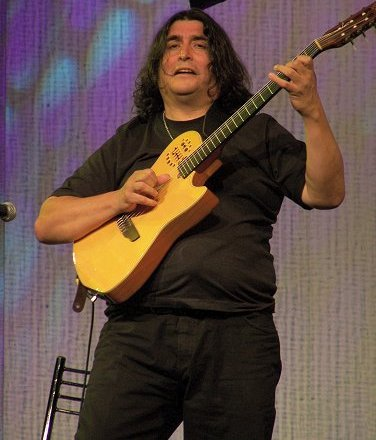

Background information
- Born: June 24, 1957 (age 68); Monte Grande, Argentina
- Genres: Jazz, pop, rock
- Occupation: Musician
- Instrument: Guitar
- Years active: 1990s–present

Luis Salinas (born 24 June 1957) is an Argentine jazz guitarist who plays electric and nylon string guitars. His music includes elements of bossa nova, samba, Afro-Uruguayan candombe, salsa, boleros, and jazz.

== Career ==
From 1985 to 1991, he worked with Egle Martin, an Argentinean singer, dancer, and producer and played on her bossa-nova album El Arte Del Encuentro. In 1993, Swedish pianist Anders Persson invited Salinas to play at the Umeå Jazz Festival, followed by a tour of Sweden. He signed with GRP Records in 1995 and recorded his debut album, Salinas, for that label in March 1996 with musicians from George Benson's group. He played at the 30th edition of the Montreux Jazz Festival.

On August 22, 1997, he played to 30,000 concert-goers at the Palabra de Guitarra Latina show in Palma, Mallorca, Spain. One week later, at the Guitarras del Mundo festival in Buenos Aires (August 26–31), he was one of main attractions, playing three concerts at Buenos Aires's La Trastienda Club.

His second album, Solo Guitarra, included a version of "You Are the Sunshine of My Life" by Stevie Wonder.

== Critical reception ==
Judith Schlesinger writing in AllMusic describes the song "Blue Zamba" on his debut album as "a lovely solo track that belongs squarely in the tradition of the great Latin acoustic players, but with a whiff of Joe Pass as well. All told, a very promising debut."

== Awards ==
Gardel Awards

- 2003 – Best folk album, Música Argentina Vol 1 y 2
- 2004 – Best Jazz album, Ahí va
- 2006 – Best Jazz album, Salinas y amigos en España
- 2007 – Best Instrumental album, Muchas Cosas
- 2008 – Best Conceptual album, Clásicos de música Argentina y algo más...

Latin Grammy nominations

- 2006 – Latin Grammy nomination for Best Instrumental album, Salinas y amigos en España
- 2008 – Latin Grammy nomination for Best Instrumental album, Tango

== Discography ==
- Aire de Tango (Dragon, 1994)
- Salinas (GRP, 1996)
- Sólo Guitarra (Dreyfus, 1999)
- Rosario (Universal, 2001)
- Música Argentina, Vol. 1 (DBN, 2002)
- Música Argentina, Vol. 2 (DBN, 2002)
- Ahí Va (DBN, 2003)
- En Vivo en el Rosedal (Dreyfus, 2005)
- Luis Salinas y Amigos en España (Pimienta, 2005)
- Muchas Cosas (GLD, 2006)
- Folklore, Vol. 1 (Epsa Music, 2007)
- Folklore, Vol. 2 (Epsa Music, 2007)
- Tango (Epsa Music, 2007)
- Sólo Guitarra (Epsa Music, 2007)
- Bonus (Epsa Music, 2007)
- Luis Salinas En Vivo Dia 1 (Epsa Music, 2009)
- Dia 2: Tango (Epsa Music, 2009)
- En Vivo Dia 3 (Epsa Music, 2009)
