= Dax Riders =

French band

- Origin: Paris, France
- Genres: Techno, synth-funk
- Years active: 1994–present
- Members: Oliver "Daxman" Dax; Cédric "Bad Ced" Azencoth; Nicolas "Erman" Berger Vachon
- Website: www.daxriders.com

Dax Riders is a French techno/synth-funk band founded in 1994 by Oliver Dax (also known as "Daxman") and Cédric Azencoth ("Bad Ced"). In 1998, the duo became a trio, when Nicolas Berger Vachon ("Erman") joined them after a successful joint concert tour as the lead singer and keyboardist. Dax Riders are considered a part of the French house movement.

== Discography ==
- Faster than a Dax (EP, 1994)
- Insert Coins (EP, 1995)
- Dax (1998)
- Back in Town (2001)
- Hot (2005)
- Dax 4 Ever (2011)

== Trivia ==
- Their bandname derives from the Honda Dax scooter.
- One of Dax Riders' works, "People", has been used to replace the original opening song of The Vision of Escaflowne (Yakusoku wa Iranai) for the official German translation of the series.
- Another song by the band, "Real Fonky Time", has been included into the EA Sports' FIFA 2003 soundtrack.
