= Ni una Sola Palabra =

"Ni Una Sola Palabra"

Single by Paulina Rubio

from the album Ananda
- Released: July 23, 2006
- Recorded: 2005
- Studio: Ananda Studios (Miami, Florida)
- Genre: Pop rock; synth-pop
- Length: 3:44
- Label: Universal Latino
- Songwriter: Xabier San Martín from La Oreja de Van Gogh
- Producer: Cachorro López

Paulina Rubio singles chronology
"Otra Vez" (2005)	"Ni Una Sola Palabra" (2006)	"Nada Puede Cambiarme" (2007)

Music video
- "Ni Una Sola Palabra" on YouTube

"Ni una Sola Palabra" (Spanish for "Not a Single Word") is a song by Mexican singer Paulina Rubio from her eighth studio album Ananda (2006). It was released on July 23, 2006, by Universal Latino, as the lead single from the album. Written by Xabi San Martín, keyboardist of the Spanish pop band La Oreja de Van Gogh, it was intended to be included in one of the band's albums, but Rubio took an interest in the song, and recorded it in 2005 at her home studio in Miami. The song was produced by Cachorro López. Musically, "Ni una Sola Palabra" is a pop rock song with elements from synth-pop, new wave and electronic.

Music critics praised the track's contemporary production, catchiness and fresh. It became a commercial success, peaking at number-one on the record charts of major markets, including Billboard's charts Hot Latin Songs and Latin Pop Songs. Also, it became Rubio's third charting single on Billboard Hot 100, to date. The song was certified triple platinum in Spain. Rolling Stone named it one of the greatest Spanish-language songs of the 21st century in 2025.

Its accompanying music video, directed by Paul Boyd, portrayed Rubio as a glamorous superhero who saves her alter ego from a gang of thugs. Rubio performed the song such as at The Jay Leno Show, at the 2006 Nobel Peace Prize, and at the 2007 Latin Billboard Music Awards, where it was won in the category of Latin Pop Airplay Song of the Year, Female. Additionally, the song has been a regular staple in the set list of Rubio's concert tours, the first being the Amor, Luz y Sonido Tour (2007–2008).

== Background and production ==
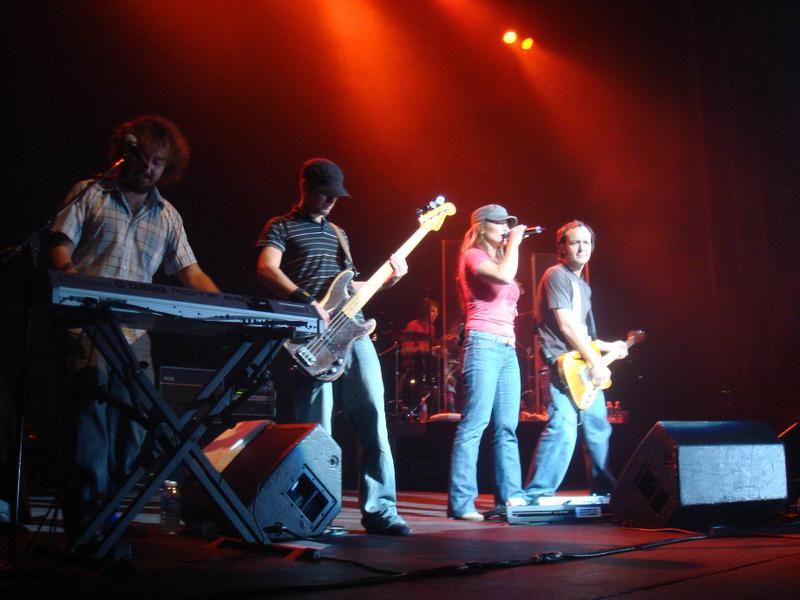
"Ni Una Sola Palabra" was written by Xabi San Martín, initially for La Oreja de Van Gogh.

"Ni Una Sola Palabra" was written by Xabier San Martín, keyboardist and songwriter from Spanish pop band La Oreja de Van Gogh, who written the song under the title "Ni Versos, Ni Miradas" for the album El Viaje de Copperpot (2000) by the band. The vocalist of La Oreja de Van Gogh, Amaia Montero, rejected the song, considering that the album was already complete at that time. San Martín rewrote the song and made it available to Sony Music Publishing to be recorded by other artists, one of them Paulina Rubio, who was fascinated by the demo. When he got the opportunity to work with Rubio, he made two versions of the song: a "superelectronic" one and another demo for her to adapt to her style. Rubio chose the "lighter" and more organic version, which contained only an acoustic guitar and drums. "She definitely fell in love with the song, said she wanted to make it her own and went ahead," says San Martín. They both worked on the production of the song, and added new details to the lyrics.

The song was retitled "Ni Una Sola Palabra," and was recorded at Rubio's home studio in Miami, Florida. It was produced by Cachorro Lopez, who fused "traditional elements" of music such as acoustic guitar, bass, and drums with a "contemporary production". Rubio was very excited to record such a profuse song. "In the process of recording and producing the album" the song "shined from the beginning", adding, "I'm so happy to be able to deliver something I'm so proud" of.

== Composition and lyrics ==
"Ni Una Sola Palabra" is a pop rock song incorporating elements from synth pop, new wave, and electronic. It is set in a moderate energetic pop at a tempo of 130 beats per minute, and was composed in the key of F♯ minor. The melody incorporates an "acoustic-electronic music interplay" whereas the beat has been described by Leila Cobo of Billboard as "uptempo". Staff of Napster described Rubio's vocals as "smoky, expressive voice". Melodically, the lyrics is "about nostalgia" of having shared special moments with a lover, but also reflects how indifference "can end a love relationship, no matter how solid or beautiful it may have been." Isabela Raygoza from Billboard noted Rubio's "poignant narratives delves into the loneliness of love lost, juxtaposing sad girl lyrics with cheerful rhythms".

== Release ==
In July 2006, an incomplete snippet demo of the song leaked onto the internet. It was circulated through fan websites and illegal music download sites. Rubio's team released the song days before to the planned official released. Universal Music Records initially targeted the single to be released to radio in August 2006, but it was advance to July 22, 2006, to contemporary hit radio, and July 24, worldwide, with the commercial release for the CD single and digital download taking place on August 15, becoming Rubio's first digital single after fans petitioned for a legal way to obtain it prior to the album hitting stores.

== Critical reception ==
"Ni Una Sola Palabra" garnered universal acclaim from music critics. El Nuevo Siglo's staff wrote that "Ni Una Sola Palabra" shows a Rubio more "fresh and evolved, totally organic". The editors of the Anodis website noted that the song "reflects a musical maturity of the singer, however, it also does not show a departure from what we have heard recently." In retrospective, Isabela Raygoza from Billboard noted "the song encapsulates a transformative moment, underscoring the evolving sound of Latin pop in the 21st century at a time."

== Chart performance ==
"Ni Una Sola Palabra" debuted on the Billboard Hot Latin Songs chart at number four on 2 September 2006, while the song jump number thirty-five to number two on Latin Pop Airplay chart, in the same week. The song went on to become a huge success peaking at #1 on both the Hot Latin Tracks and Latin Pop Airplay charts for several weeks. It has also managed to chart at #98 on the Billboard Hot 100 becoming her third song to chart there. As of December 11, 2009, "Ni Una Sola Palabra" ranked as the 59th song of the last ten years in the Top Latin Songs Chart from Latin Billboard.

The song was chart-topping radio airplay in España, Chile, Perú y Centroamérica, while reached in the top five in Argentina, Colombia, Venezuela, Uruguay, Paraguay y Bolivia.

According to the Sociedad General de Autores y Editores in Spain, "Ni Una Sola Palabra" became one of the ten songs with the highest rotation on the radio and with the most acceptance in discos, bars and disco-pubs in 2007. It also became one of the ten best-selling songs on ¡Tunes from that same country.

== Music video ==
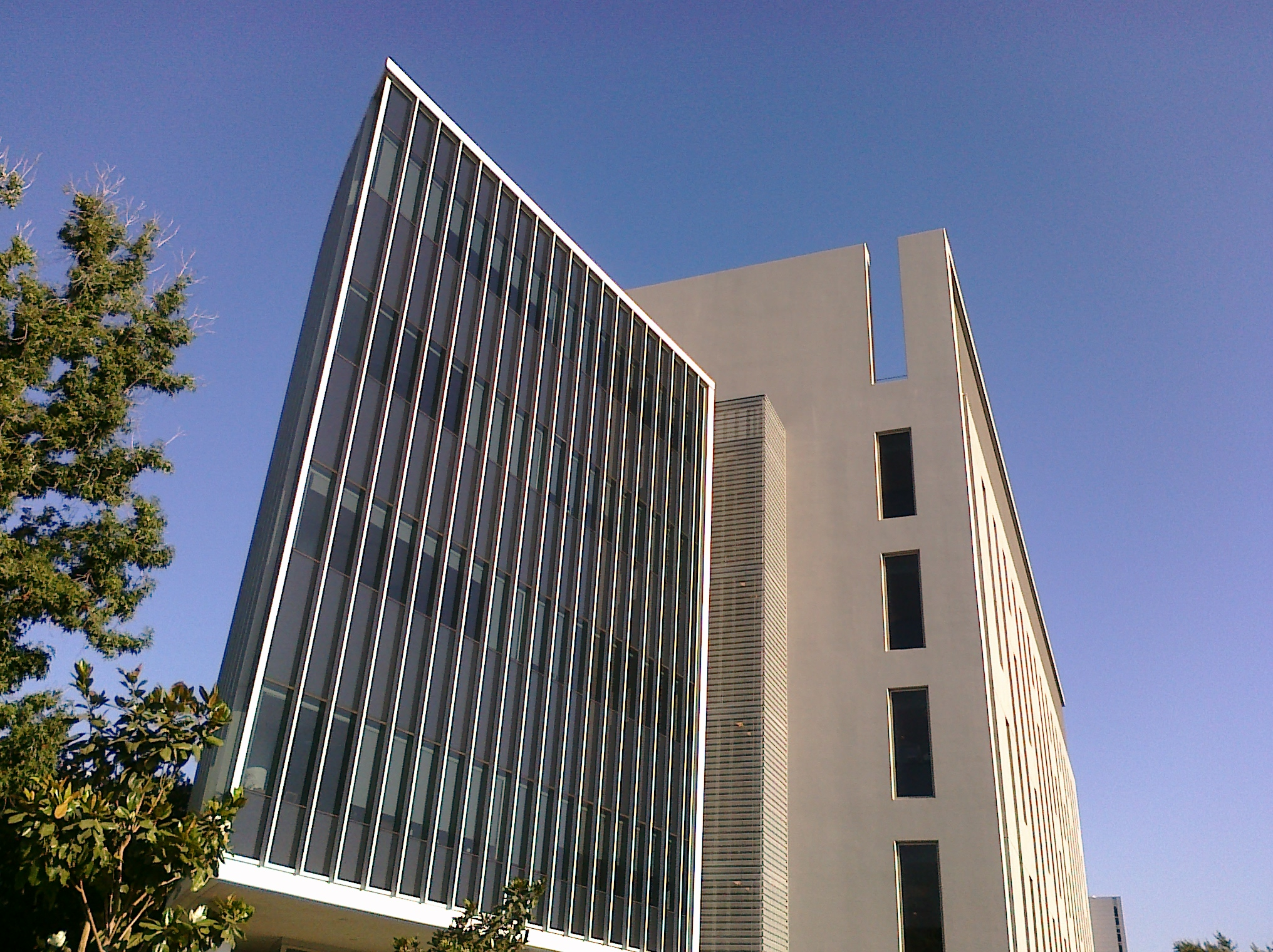
The video was filmed at the City of Hope

The music video for "Ni Una Sola Palabra" was filmed on July 28, 2006, at a building that houses The City of Hope in downtown Los Angeles, California, with additional scenes later being filmed on July 29, 2006, in the same location, for a total of 15 hours. It was directed by Paul Boyd, who work with Rubio for the first time, and produced by Todd Young. A week after filming, the entrepreneur and music executive Steven Gottlieb wrote from the website VideoStatic "Since it's all about action and not words, this video will feature the Mexican pop star Paulina Rubio fighting crime on various rooftops in downtown Los Angeles". The video features Rubio's alter ego Pauwer Woman as superhero, whose habitat includes the skyscrapers. During the video feature her Pomeranian dog, Miranda (since 2001's "Yo No Soy Esa Mujer"). The music video premiered on Univision's Despierta América and Primer Impacto on September 5, 2006. As of December, 2021, the music video of "Ni Una Sola Palabra" has over 100 million views on YouTube.

=== Synopsis and reception ===
The video begins with Paupower Woman watching from a skyscraper and guarding the city from the criminals and villains. She wears a gold-clad outfit that includes a golden cape, bracelets, gadgets and golden platform shoes sophisticated technology. The superheroine stops to look at an ordinary Rubio alter-ego walking on a deserted street in the night light while sucking on a lollipop, wearing fringed camisole and a jeans. Paupower Woman observes that the young girl is being chased by four men aboard a car, and she come down from the skyscraper to help her. When the ordinary Rubio takes shelter in a parking lot, the criminals surround her and try to kidnap her. Then, Paupower Woman begins to fight against them with her out-of-body powers. The video concludes with Rubio making the "silence sign" on the initial skyscraper, and feeding her pet Miranda.

In retrospect, the staff of El Heraldo de México noted that the superheroine's wardrobe honors her nickname "The Golden Girl", also and from a less superficial approach, noted that in the video "as a heroine who imparts justice and puts men in their place who want to take advantage of women, [music video is] a revelation for the time", which further strengthens her work as a feminist artist.

=== Paul Boyd alternate video ===
Paul Boyd leaked an alternative version of the video online on he official website, and included new scenes, which featured Rubio strutting in similar scenes to official video but light of day. The final scene show the superheroine Paupower Woman and the ordinary girl Rubio (alter ego) kissing.

== Live performances ==
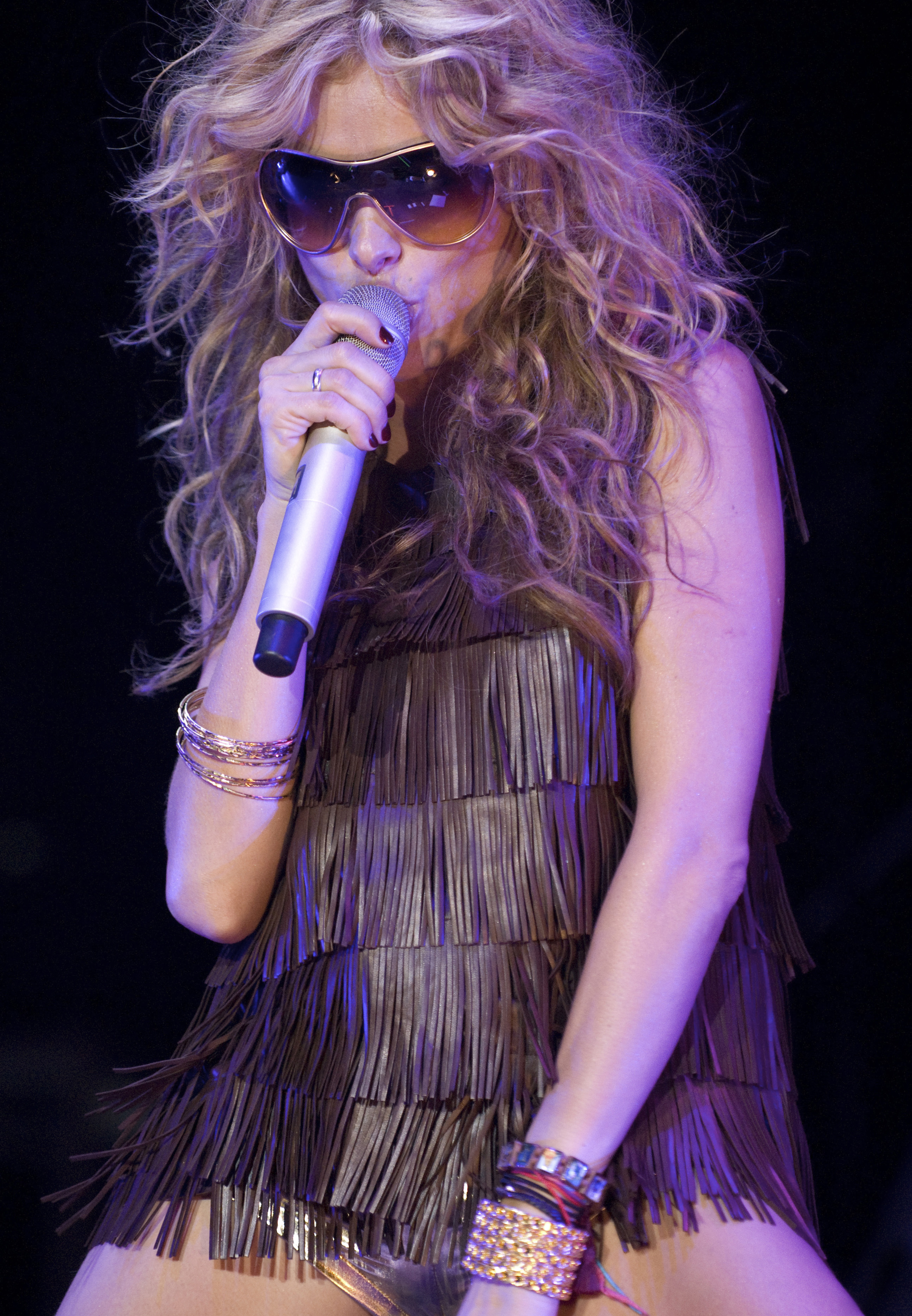
Paulina Rubio performing at the Asics Music Festival in Barcelona.

Rubio first performed "Ni Una Sola Palabra" at the Malaga Summer 2006, a concert special that aired in MTV Spain on August 12, 2006. A performance of the song at The Tonight Show with Jay Leno premiered on September when begin promotional Ananda in America; she sing live with a golden microphone and was surrounded with her musicians and two choristers. Also she performed it on the music television show CD USA. On December 12, Rubio performed the song and the English version of "Miénteme Una Vez Más" ("Beautiful Lie") at the Nobel Peace Prize Concert in Oslo, Norway, to honor laureates Muhammad Yunus and Grameen Bank. She played with the Norwegian Radio Orchestra and became the first Mexican artist performing in a Nobel Prize concert. Three days later, she returned to Spain to perform at Los Premios 40 Principales 2006. She performed the song descending from the roof of the Palacio de Deportes de la Comunidad de Madrid, all dressed in gold, very much in the style of Barbarella.

During the Cadena Dial Awards, held on February 27, 2007, in Spain, Rubio performed the song and received an award as one of the "ambassadors of music in Spanish"; she dressed in a tight silver glitter dress signed by Roberto Cavalli. On April 26, Rubio opened the fourteenth edition of the Latin Billboard Music Awards in Coral Gables, Florida by performing the song with the violin arrangements of "Eleanor Rigby" by The Beatles. She also performed the song "Nena" with Miguel Bosé and received two awards for Best Female Latin Pop Album and Best Female Latin Pop Airplay Song of the Year. In September 2007, during the Argentina leg of her Amor, Luz y Sonido Tour, she performed on the finale of the second season of the talent show Latin American Idol, where she performed "Ni Una Sola Palabra" and "Nada Puede Cambiarme".

== Other versions ==
On March 20, 2007, Rubio released a new remix titled "Ni Una Sola Palabra (Belanova Remix)" from the Ananda's deluxe edition, based an electronic arrangement. The term "Belanova" in the title refers to the Mexican pop band. The remix was positively reviewed by music critics, who described it as "electronic sheen" and dance-leaning than the original version. Two versions ("pasito duranguense" and "norteño") of regional Mexican genre were released to impact the Hispanic audience in the United States. The versions reached number four on the Billboard Regional Mexican Songs chart.

== Legacy and culture impact ==
"Ni Una Sola Palabra" is considered to be one of the best songs of Rubio's career. Isabela Raygoza from Billboard wrote, "it not only solidified Rubio's status as a Latin pop icon but also reinforced the international appel of Latin music well into the new millennium." According to the musical section of the Spanish tabloid Diario AS, the song is considered one of Rubio's songs from the 2000s that marked a resounding success in Spain. Chilean poet and journalist Jorge Montealegre from the book 'Wurlitzer: Cantantes en la Memoria Chilena' opined that it is "the best song of the Mexican popstar." In their publication, he cited the poet Héctor Hernández Montecinos, who used the phrase from the song: "Ni una sola palabra, ni gestos, ni miradas" in his poetic work 'La Divina Revelación', praising the poetic lyrical composition of the title.

In 2021, Mexican edition of Elle noted that the song was "the unexpected anthem of the snowfall in Madrid" after popularity and the viral video where people sang the song while enjoying the unexpected snowfall at Puerta del Sol. The impact was more evident in Latin America, where Rubio was a trending topic and the social media and media marked her as a cultural legacy. That same year, the Universidad Autónoma de Nuevo León approved the publication of a book compiled by writer Elma Correa entitled "Ni una sola palabra", which portrays Rubio as a sui generis of pop culture.

Billboard named the song among the greatest Spanish-language pop songs from 2000 to 2023. Interest in the song experienced a resurgence in 2025 after it went viral on TikTok, particularly in Spain. That same year, Rolling Stone included the song in its list of the 100 greatest Spanish-language songs of the 21st century.

== Cover versions ==
The song was covered on the 2007 Catalonia TV show El Club by Televisió de Catalunya, in a Spanish singer Roger Mas Catalan-inspired performance acoustic renamed "Ni Una Sola Paraula". It was included in his EP Cançons Estranyes (2010). Finland dance-pop group Unelmavävyt recorded a Finnish-language cover of "Ni Una Sola Palabra", renamed "Kanssas kävelen rantaa" for their album, Lauluja Tytöistä Ja Pojista (2011). Spanish musician Yorch covered the song with "more electric and darker overtones than the festive pop of the original" on a promotional single.

== Track listings and formats ==
- US / Europe CD single
1. "Ni Una Sola Palabra" – 3:55
- US Maxi-CD
1. "Ni Una Sola Palabra" (Album Version) – 3:55
2. "Ni Una Sola Palabra" (Pasito Duranguense version) – 3:46
3. "Ni Una Sola Palabra" (Norteña version) – 3:25
4. "Ni Una Sola Palabra" (Don Candiani Reggaton Remix) Feat. Trebol Clan – 3:16
5. "Ni Una Sola Palabra" (Nico Prosen B.A. mix) – 4:55
6. "Ni Una Sola Palabra" (DJ Hessler In Da House Extended Version) – 7:49
7. "Ni Una Sola Palabra" (DJ Hessler In Da House Radio Mix) – 3:42

== Personnel ==
The following people contributed to "Ni Una Sola Palabra":

- Paulina Rubio – lead vocals
- Xabier San Martín Beldarrían - songwriting, all instruments
- Cachorro López — production, backing vocals, vocal production
- Peter Mokran - mixing, additional engineering
- Sebastian Schon - bass (vocal), backing vocals
- Juan Abalos - mastering
- Recorded at Ananda Studios in Di Lido Island, Florida

== Charts ==
=== Weekly charts ===
Chart (2006–2007)	Peak position
Argentina (Associated Press)	7
Chile (Associated Press)	8
European Hot 100 Singles (Billboard)	14
Guatemala (EFE)	5
Finland (Suomen virallinen lista)	2
Nicaragua (EFE)	4
Paraguay (Associated Press)	1
Russia Airplay (Tophit)	234
US Billboard Hot 100	98
US Radio Songs (Billboard)	50
US Hot Latin Songs (Billboard)	1
US Latin Pop Airplay (Billboard)	1
US Tropical Songs (Billboard)	2
US Latin Rhythm Airplay (Billboard)	31
US Regional Mexican Songs (Billboard)	4
Uruguay (Associated Press)	7
Venezuela (Record Report)	7

=== Year-end charts ===
Chart (2006)	Position
US Hot Latin Songs (Billboard)	18
US Hot Latin Pop Airplay Songs (Billboard)	13
US Hot Latin Tropical Airplay Songs (Billboard)	30

Chart (2007)	Position
Finland (Suomen virallinen lista)	33
US Hot Latin Pop Airplay Songs (Billboard)	29

== Certifications and sales ==
Region	Certification	Certified units/sales
Finland	—	3,946
Spain (Promusicae)	3× Platinum	60,000^{^}
Spain (Promusicae) 2015 onwards	Platinum	60,000^{‡}
^{^} Shipments figures based on certification alone.^{‡} Sales+streaming figures based on certification alone.

== Release history ==
Release dates and formats for "Ni Una Sola Palabra"
Region	Date	Format	Version	Label	Ref.
Mexico	July 22, 2006	Contemporary hit radio	Original	Universal	
Various	July 24, 2006	Contemporary hit radio	Original	Universal	
Russia	September 20, 2006	Contemporary hit radio	Original	Universal	

== See also ==
- List of number-one Billboard Hot Latin Songs of 2006
- List of number-one Billboard Latin Pop Airplay songs of 2006
- Billboard Latin Music Award for Latin Pop Song of the Year
