= Nada Puede Cambiarme =

Single by Paulina Rubio

from the album Ananda
- Released: January 18, 2007
- Recorded: 2006
- Studio: Ananda Studios (Miami, Florida)
- Genre: Pop rock
- Length: 3:38
- Label: Universal Latino
- Songwriter: Fernando Montesinos
- Producer: Áureo Baqueiro

Paulina Rubio singles chronology
"Ni Una Sola Palabra" (2006)	"Nada Puede Cambiarme" (2007)	"Nena" (2007)

Music video
- "Nada Puede Cambiarme" on YouTube

"Nada Puede Cambiarme" (English:"Nothing Can Change Me") is a song recorded by Mexican singer Paulina Rubio, features electric guitar by Guns N' Roses's Slash. It is the second track on Rubio's eighth studio album, Ananda (2006), which was written by Fernando Montesinos, with production from Áureo Baqueiro. The song was released as second single from Ananda on January 18, 2007 by Universal Latino.

"Nada Puede Cambiarme" features guitar instrumentation, drums and keyboards. The song is set in a rock environment with electric guitars. Upon its release, the song received mixed reviews from contemporary music critics, who praised the production, while the press and public were upset by Rubio and Slash's collaboration. The song reached the top 10 on the US Latin Pop Airplay chart, in addition to placing in the top 20 in countries such as Mexico, Spain and Venezuela.

The music video for "Nada Puede Cambiarme", directed by Dago Gonzalez, portrays a glam-rock wedding celebration; it shows her dressed as a bride, and different male models walking down a runway. Slash appears in the middle of the video performing his guitar solo.

== Composition ==
"Nada Puede Cambiarme" is a pop rock tune. Lyrically, the song is an anthem of female empowerment, where the narrator decides to optimistically accept an ended relationship, choosing to celebrate herself and move on, albeit with the faint hope of getting back together with her lover.

== Reception ==
=== Critical response ===
The song received mixed reviews from critics, especially for Slash's appearance, which they considered "excellent" and "curious". In a retrospective review, Tony Grassi from Guitar World site deemed the song one of Rubio's most glossiest pop tunes, "but then the two-and-a-half-minute mark hits and Slash injects a healthy dose of electric sting to the mix." However, the song also received negative reviews from music critics. Remezcla's staff was jaded by Rubio's Spanishisms, commenting that it "is pretty bad as it is–a dumb singalong with overblown Spanishisms".

Upon its released, several media and fans of the hard rock genre were outraged. In retrospect, the newspaper La Voz de Galicia listed the song in its list of "the strangest musical duets in history," asserting that "no one can explain why the guitarist of a hard rock band agreed to collaborate on a pop song." As well, it was included in the "most surprising duets in music" list of the Mexican edition of the magazine ¡Hola!.

=== Chart performance ===
"Nada Puede Cambiarme" reached number nine on the Spain Digital Singles chart, based solely on digital download sales. On the Airplay chart, the track reached number twenty-nine on the Los 40. Eventually, it was certified gold. In Rubio's native Mexico, it debuted at number twenty-three on 6 January 2007, and reached at number sixteen three weeks later. The song performed better in South America, mainly in Paraguay, where it reached number three on the Radio Latina chart, while in Venezuela it reached number twelve on the Record Report chart.

In the United States, "Nada Puede Cambiarme" debuted on the Billboard's chart Hot Latin Songs at number thirty-one on 3 February 2007. Three weeks later, the song reached number twenty-one. It one chart performed better on the Latin Pop Airplay, where the song debuted at number twenty-six, then rising to number six.

== Music video ==
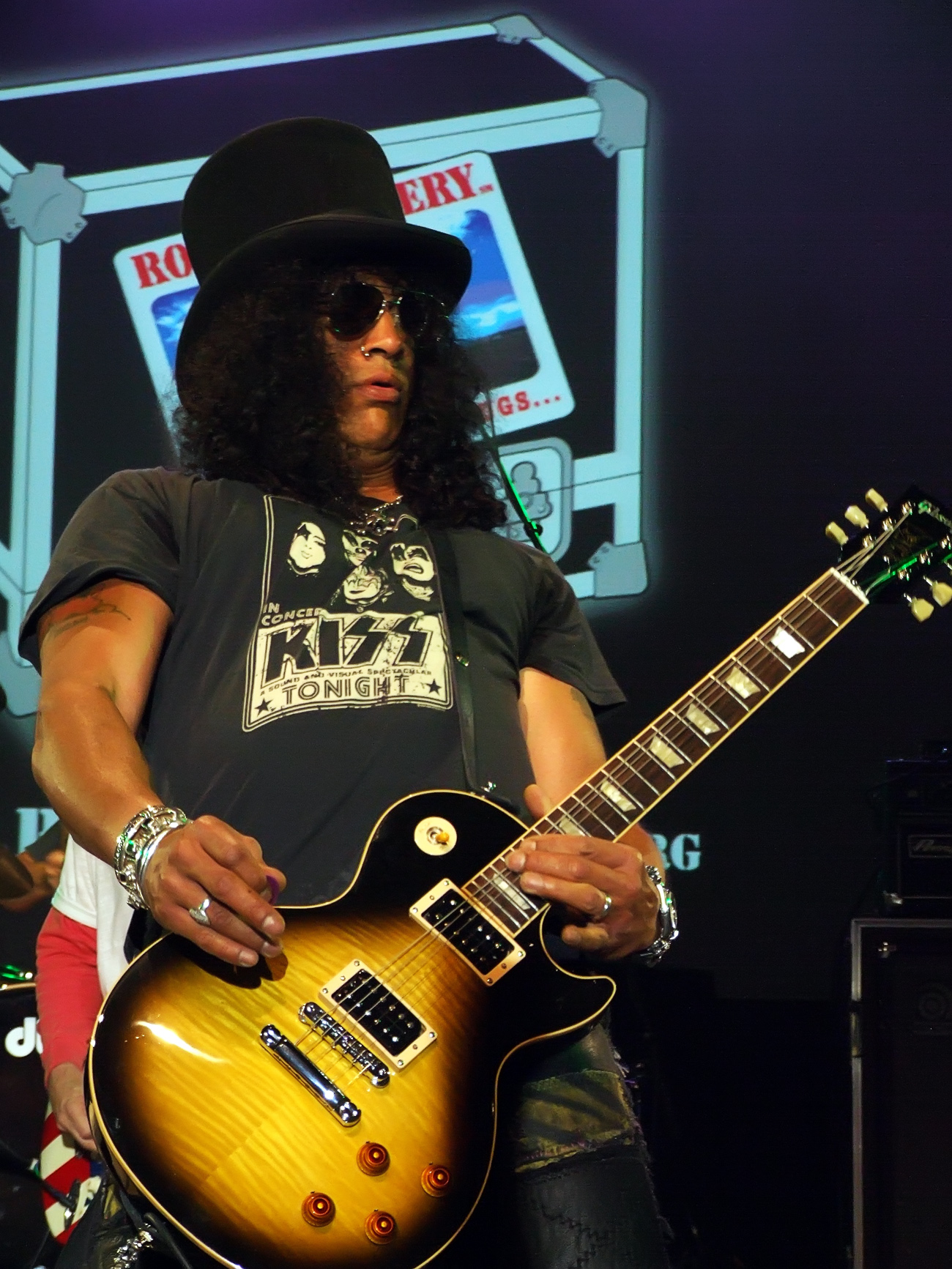
Slash participated in the song and music video for "Nada Puede Cambiarme".

=== Conception and filming ===
The accompanying music video was directed by Dago González, who had previously helmed Rubio's "Algo Tienes" clip in 2004, and was produced by Anke Thommen, with whom she first worked. The video was shot on the Mack Sennett Studios in Los Angeles, California on January 9, 2007, with a total filming of 16 hours. It stars Rubio, Guns N' Roses' guitarist, Slash, who collaborated on the guitar solo in the bridge of the song, as well as dancer Daniel "Cloud" Campos. Music video's atmosphere was described as "a fashion show full of glamrock" in which Rubio is "the sexiest and most daring bride," while Slash's appearance was described as energetic "with his guitar intensifying the energy of the most fun and unusual wedding." Slash confessed that it was Rubio who encouraged him to shoot the clip. Although he didn't have high expectations, he finally said that "it was an interesting session. I never thought it would be as big a deal as it was at the time."

=== Release and reception ===
The music video debuted on Los 40 Principales and Cuatro°. Los 40 Principales official website aired a special material, which included exclusively premiered of the "Making Of" images of the clip, the EPK of Ananda and an interview. In other territories such as Costa Rica, the music video was released on February 8, 2007.

The clip begins with Rubio dressed in a sophisticated corset style purple one-piece bridal gown. Traditional wedding bells are heard in the background. Everything changes in a second, and the atmosphere takes on the look of a fashion show with models parading in dark clothes and black eye makeup. Some models play their violins while the others model. Soon, Rubio comes on stage with a bouquet of flowers and an excess of glitter in her eyes. She wins the applause of the audience, but two models try to take her away unsuccessfully. The cameramen begin to capture Rubio's moment and golden papers in the shape of dollars fall from the ceiling. She then appears dancing on a huge golden Gibson Explorer-style guitar that sits atop a fuchsia-toned replica of a cake. During the beginning of the guitar solo, a voice-over interrupts the wedding celebration as a close-up of a shadowy model emulating the wedding priest emerges. "If anyone present knows of any impediment to celebrating this union, let them speak now or forever hold their peace," is heard in voice-over. Then out comes Slash playing his guitar solo while Rubio joins him dancing in front of him and passing under his legs. The clip ends with Rubio throwing the bouquet of flowers and running towards the cake.

Several fans of the rock genre and Guns N' Roses music were outraged when tle music video was released. The Radio Oasis website wrote that "we don't really know what to think of this wedding. Maybe they wanted to create a song, chewy and repetitive like Paulina's usually are, with the presence of Slash and one of his forceful solos, but definitely not possible." In a similar way, the editors of La Gramola Encendida said that the singer plays at being "a Mercadona pre-Lady Gaga" while Slash is "a guitar God who has remained more like a living myth than the magnificent guitarist he is." In a Rolling Stone en Español article about musical collaborations that took the world by surprise, Barbara Mourinho wrote: "Although it's not a track recorded as a collaboration, the surprise of seeing legendary guitarist Slash in Paulina Rubio's music video still lingers to this day".

== Track listing and formats ==
- Digital download
1. "Nada Puede Cambiarme" (Acoustic Version) – 3:30
2. "Nada Puede Cambiarme" – 3:38
- Finland CD Single
1. "Nada Puede Cambiarme" – 3:38
- Maxi-Single – Remixes
1. "Nada Puede Cambiarme" (Caribbean Nights Remix Edit) – 3:38
2. "Nada Puede Cambiarme" (Caribbean Nights Extended Remix) – 6:45
3. "Nada Puede Cambiarme" (Pasito Duranguense) – 3:20
4. "Nada Puede Cambiarme" (Reggaeton feat. Franco "El Gorilla") – 2:41
- EP
1. "Nada Puede Cambiarme" – 3:38
2. "Nada Puede Cambiarme" (Caribbean Nights Club Edit) – 3:33
3. "Nada Puede Cambiarme" (Pasito Duranguense Version) – 3:20
4. "Nada Puede Cambiarme" (Acoustic Version) – 3:30

== Personnel ==
The following people contributed to "Nada Puede Cambiarme":

- Paulina Rubio – lead vocals
- Fernando Montesinos — songwriter
- Aureo Baqueiro - production
- Peter Mokran - mixing
- Tom Baker - mastering
- Slash - guitar
- Recorded at Ananda Studios in Di Lido Island, Miami Beach, Florida

== Charts ==
Chart (2007)	Peak position
Honduras (EFE)	1
US Hot Latin Songs (Billboard)	21
US Latin Pop Airplay (Billboard)	6
US Tropical Songs (Billboard)	33
Venezuela (Record Report)	12

== Certifications ==
Region	Certification	Certified units/sales
Spain (Promusicae)	Gold	10,000^{^}
^{^} Shipments figures based on certification alone.

== Release history ==
Country	Date	Format	Label	Ref.
Various	January 18, 2007	Contemporary hit radio	Universal Latino	
Various	January 29, 2007	Digital download; CD single	Universal Latino	
Various	February 6, 2007	Digital download; EP	Universal Latino	
Italy	March 5, 2007	Digital download	Universal Music Group	
