= Dame Otro Tequila =

Single by Paulina Rubio

from the album Pau-Latina
- Released: August 23, 2004
- Recorded: 2003
- Genre: Pop, ranchera, latin rock
- Length: 2:42
- Label: Universal Records
- Songwriters: E. Estefan, R. Gaitán, A. Gaitán, T. Mardoni, T. Mcwilliams
- Producer: E. Estefan

Paulina Rubio singles chronology
"Algo Tienes" (2004)	"Dame Otro Tequila" (2004)	"Mia" (2005)

Audio video
- "Dame Otro Tequila" on YouTube

"Dame Otro Tequila" (English: Give Me Another Tequila) is a song written by Emilio Estefan, Ricardo Gaitán, Alberto Gaitán, Tony Mardoni and Tom Mcwilliams for Rubio's seventh album Pau-Latina (2004). It was produced by Emilio Estefan, co-produced by Gaitan Bros and Tony Mardini and released as the album's third single in North America and Latin America (see 2004 in music).

== Formats and track listing ==
These are the formats and track listings of major single releases of "Dame Otro Tequila".

Mexico CD promo

1. "Dame Otro Tequila - Album Version"
2. "Dame Otro Tequila - Quirri Mix"
3. "Dame Otro Tequila - Dance Remix"
4. "Dame Otro Tequila - Reggaeton" (feat. Baby Rasta)
5. "Dame Otro Tequila - Banda Urbana Version"

== Music video ==
The video was released in the MTV VMALA's 2004, in the red carpet.

== Chart performance ==
The song was a success peaking at number one on the Hot Latin Songs as well as the Latin Pop Airplay. It is the album's third consecutive top ten single as well as the second number one from Pau-Latina. The song managed to peak at #105 on the U.S. Also, it was number one Billboard Biz (.biz) charts, such as Top Internet and Top Reggae charts; as well the music video was number one on VHS Sales, Video Rentals and Game Rentals charts.

== Charts ==
Chart (2004)	Peak position
US Bubbling Under Hot 100 Singles (Billboard)	5
US Hot Latin Songs (Billboard)	1
US Latin Pop Airplay (Billboard)	1
US Tropical Songs (Billboard)	2
