= List of songs recorded by Paulina Rubio =

List of recorded songs by Paulina Rubio

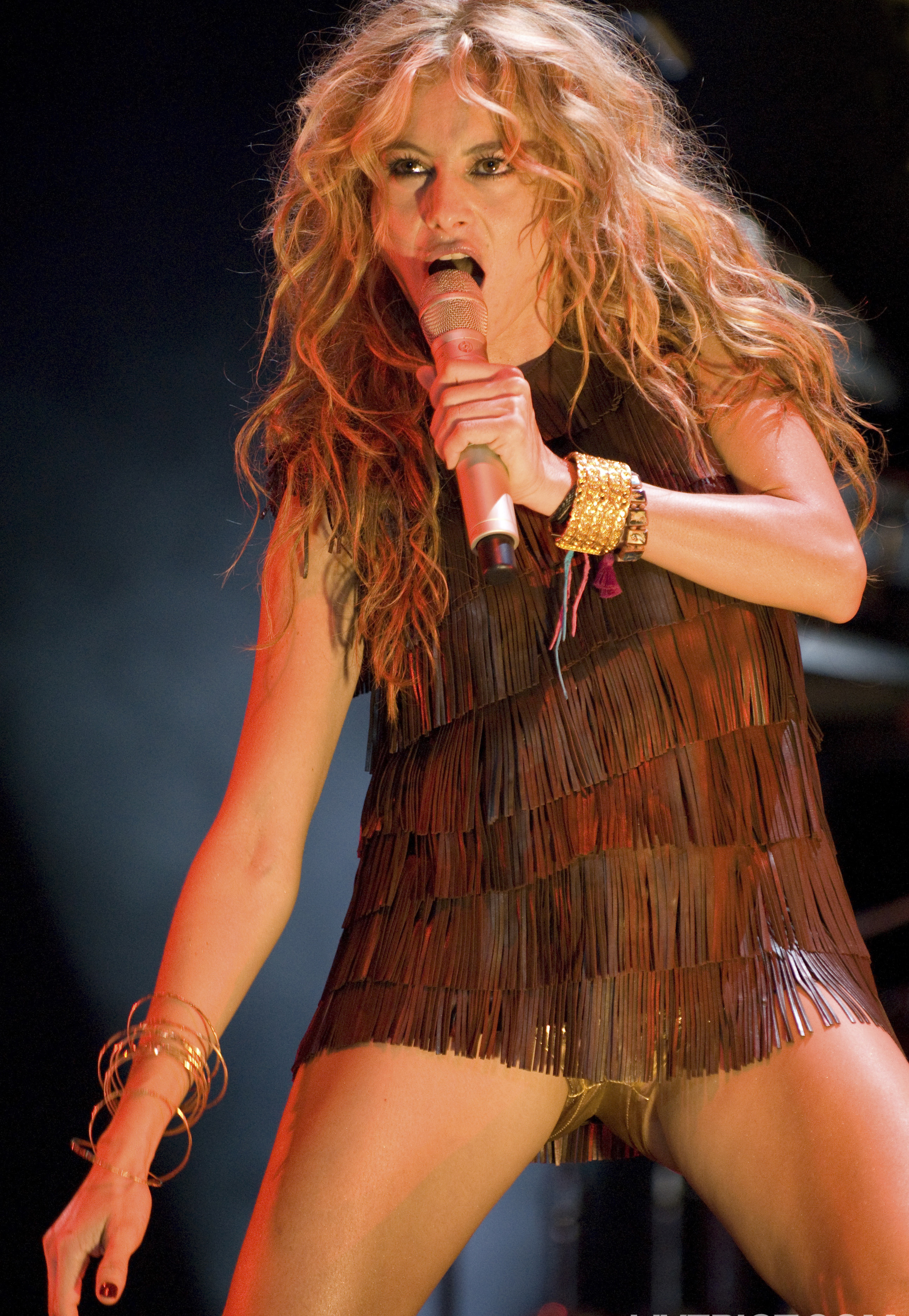
Paulina Rubio performing in 2007.

Paulina Rubio is a Mexican singer and actress who rose to fame in the 1980s as a member of the pop band Timbiriche. After recording 10 studio albums with the group, she left the band to pursue a solo career. She released her debut album La Chica Dorada in 1992. After releasing four albums under EMI Music, she then signed a contract with Universal, releasing Paulina in the year 2000, the most successful record of her career. She released six more albums and then she continued her career as an independent artist with the release of her stand-alone single Si Supieran in 2019.

== Songs ==
Key
†	Indicates a song Paulina Rubio has covered
≠	Indicates the English version of a song originally released in Spanish
±	Indicates the Spanish version of a song originally released in English
‡	Indicates a song that was recorded as part of a super group
÷	Indicates a song that samples and older song
*	Indicates a song that appears On a special version of the album

Released songs recorded by Paulina Rubio
Song	Other performer(s)	Writer(s)	Originating album	Year	Ref.
"A Contraluz"		Paulina Rubio; Rafa Vergara; Lester Méndez	Gran City Pop	2009	
"A Ti, Volver, Regresar"		Claudio Bermúdez	El Tiempo Es Oro	1995	
"Abriendo las puertas al amor"		José Ramón Florez; César Valle; Difelisatti	La Chica Dorada	1992	
"Adentro"		Yasmil Marrufo; Mario Cáceres; Servando Primera	Deseo *	2019	
"Adiosito Corazón"		Jorge Villamizar	Pau-Latina	2004	
"Alma en Libertad"		Jorge Villamizar; Juan Carlos Pérez Soto	Pau-Latina	2004	
"Algo De Ti"		Paulina Rubio; Rafa Vergara; Mauricio Gasca; Lester Méndez	Gran City Pop	2009	
"Algo De Ti (Remix Dance)"	Juan Magán	Paulina Rubio; Rafa Vergara; Mauricio Gasca; Lester Méndez; Juan Magán	Non-album single	2010	
"Algo tienes"		Chris Rodríguez; M. Benito	Pau-Latina	2004	
"Algo Tienes (Instrumental)"		Chris Rodríguez; M. Benito	Pau-Latina	2004	
"All Around the World"		Paulina Rubio; RedOne; Jimmy Joker; Teddy Sky; AJ Junior; Bilal Haiji	Brava!	2011	
"Amanecí Sin Ti"		Andrés Levin; I. Padron; Fernando Osorio; Cuculand Music	Gran City Pop	2009	
"Amarnos No Es Pecado"		Vanessa Méndez; Mario Shajris; Daniel García	El Tiempo Es Oro	1995	
"Amarte en Libertad"		José Ramón Florez; César Valle; Difelisatti	La Chica Dorada	1992	
"Amor de Mujer"		José Ramón Florez; César Valle; Difelisatti	La Chica Dorada	1992	
"Amor Secreto"		Reyli Barba; Ferra	Pau-Latina	2004	
"Asunto De Dos"		Don Matamoros	24 Kilates	1993	
"Aún"		Paulina Rubio	El Tiempo Es Oro	1995	
"Aunque No Sea Conmigo"		Santiago Díaz Vera	Ananda	2006	
"Ayúdame"		Coti	Ananda	2006	
"Baby Paulina"			Paulina	2000	
"Baila Casanova" ±		Kevin Colbert; Jeeve Ducornet; Estéfano; Calanit Ledani; Darryl Zero	Border Girl	2002	
"Baila Conmigo"	Bibi Gaytan; Eduardo Capetillo; Stephanie Salas; El Gato; Gerardo Gallardo; Angélica Ruvalcaba; Rodrigo Vidal	Manuel Pacho; Rosa Salcedo	Baila Conmigo	1992	
"Baila Conmigo el Rock and Roll"	Bibi Gaytan; Eduardo Capetillo; Stephanie Salas; El Gato; Gerardo Gallardo	Ricardo Ochoa; Jaynelle	Baila Conmigo	1992	
"Baila Que Baila"		Paulina Rubio; Teddy Méndez; Edwin Pérez; J. De Jesús; Tea Time	Pau-Latina	2004	
"Bajo la Luna"		Paulina Rubio; Eric López Raya; Álvaro Porqueras Rubio; David Julca; Javier García; Jonathan Julca	Deseo	2018	
"Balada Pop"		Paulina Rubio; Patrick A. Ingunza; Viviana Carolina Nava Ochoa	Non-album single	2024	
"Bésame en la Boca"		Didi Gutman; Adrián Posse	El Tiempo Es Oro	1995	
"Border Girl"		David Eriksen; Richard Marx; Sindre Hotvedt	Border Girl	2002	
"Boys Will Be Boys"		Bilal Haiji; RedOne; Adam Baptiste; Alex Papaconstantinou	Bravísima! and Brava! Reload	2012	
"Cancún y Yo"		Alberto Aguilera Valadez; Marcello Azevedo	Paulina	2000	
"Casanova"		Kevin Colbert; Jeeve Ducornet; Estéfano; Calanit Ledani; Darryl Zero	Border Girl	2002	
"Cásate Con Tu Mamá"		Paulina Rubio; Adriana Lucía	Brava!	2011	
"Causa y Efecto"		Mario Domm; Mónica Vélez Solano	Gran City Pop	2009	
"Causa y Efecto (Banda)"		Mario Domm; Mónica Vélez Solano; Alberto "Lion King" De León	Gran City Pop	2009	
"Causa y Efecto (Urban Remix)"	Angel & Khriz	Mario Domm; Mónica Vélez Solano; Angel & Khriz	6 Super Hits	2009	
"Cómo Me las Maravillaría Yo"	Rosario	Rafael de León; Pedrero Juan Solano	Parte de Mí	2008	
"Compañía"		César Valle; C. Sánchez; Don Matamoros	24 Kilates	1993	
"Corazón Tirano"		José Ramón Florez; Fredy Marugan	24 Kilates	1993	
"Cuánto Te Quiero" ÷		Jonathan Julca; David Julca; Joey Montana; Ritchie Valens	Deseo	2018	
"Dame Más (Afterparty)"		Paulina Rubio; Enrique Larreal; Juan José Covarrubias; Yasmil Jesús Marrufo; Servando Primera; Mario Cáceres	Deseo *	2019	
"Dame Otro Tequila"		Emilio Estefan; Tony Mardini; Alberto Gaitán; Tom McWilliams	Pau-Latina	2004	
"Dame Tu Amor" ÷		Paulina Rubio; Claudia Brant; Richard "Humpty" Vission; Gary Brown; Amanda Cee	Pau-Latina	2004	
"De Qué Sirve"		Paulina Rubio; Andrés Castro; Edgar Barrera	Non-album single	2019	
"Desire (Me Tienes Loquita)"	Nacho	Paulina Rubio; Nacho	Deseo	2018	
"Despiértate"		Paulina Rubio; Bella Morel; Fredrik Lenander; Lars Erlandsson; Per Magnusson; David Kreuger	Planeta Paulina	1996	
"Diamante Puro"		César Valle; C. Sánchez	24 Kilates	1993	
"Dime"		Paulina Rubio; Thomas Grant	Planeta Paulina	1996	
"Dime Si Soy Sexy"		José Ramón Florez; César Valle; Remy Causse	La Chica Dorada	1992	
"Don't Say Goodbye"		Gen Rubin; Cheryl Yie	Border Girl	2002	
"Él Me Engañó"		César Valle; Don Matamoros	24 Kilates	1993	
"El Primer Amor"		Raúl Alejandro Escajadillo Peña	La Chica Dorada	1992	
"El Tren de la Vida"		Paulina Rubio; Estéfano; David Cabrera; Chris Rodríguez	Gran City Pop	2009	
"El Último Adiós"		Estéfano; Chris Rodríguez	Paulina	2000	
"El Último Adiós (The Last Goodbye)" ‡	Various Artists	Gian Marco; Emilio Estefan	Non-album single	2001	
"En el Nombre del Amor"		César Valle; C. Sánchez	El Tiempo Es Oro	1995	
"Entre la Luna y el Sol"		Daniel Carbonell; Tomas Tirtha Rundquist; Toy Hernández; Manuel Rendón	Deseo	2018	
"Enamorada"		Paulina Rubio; César Valle	Planeta Paulina	1996	
"Enséñame"		Paulina Rubio; Estéfano; David Cabrera	Gran City Pop	2009	
"Escaleras de Arena"		Mario Domm; Mónica Vélez Solano; Lester Méndez	Gran City Pop	2009	
"Estas Navidades" ‡	Estrellas de Navidad	G.P. Felisatti	Estrellas de Navidad	1997	
"Fire (Sexy Dance)" ≠		Estéfano	Border Girl	2002	
"Golpes en el Corazón" †	Los Tigres del Norte	Víctor Valencia; Pablo Castro	MTV Unplugged: Los Tigres del Norte and Friends	2011	
"Heat of the Night"		RedOne; Jimmy Joker; AJ Junior; Teddy Sky	Brava!	2011	
"Historia de Navidad"		Aleks Syntek	Estrellas de Navidad	1997	
"Hoy"		Adrián Sosa	Ananda	2006	
"Hoy Eres Ayer"		David Julca; Yoel Henríquez; Jonathan Julca	Deseo	2018	
"Hoy Te Dejé De Amar"		Marco Flores	El Tiempo Es Oro	1995	
"Hoy Me Toca a Mí"	Taboo	Paulina Rubio; Taboo; Sebastian Jacome; Larry Hernández	Brava!	2011	
"I Was Made for Lovin' You" †		Paul Stanley; Desmond Child; Vini Poncia	Border Girl	2002	
"I'll Be Right Here (Sexual Lover)" ≠		Jodi Marr; Estéfano	Border Girl	2002	
"I'm So in Love" ≠		Paulina Rubio; César Valle	I'm So in Love: Grandes Éxitos	2001	
"Introducción"		César Valle; C. Sánchez	El Tiempo Es Oro	1995	
"Introducción"		Paulina Rubio; César Valle	Planeta Paulina	1996	
"La Chica Dorada"		José Ramón Florez; César Valle; Difelisatti	La Chica Dorada	1992	
"La Danza del Escorpión"		Paulina Rubio; Fernando Montesinos; Rubén Villanueva	Gran City Pop	2009	
"La Escoba" †		Los Sirex	La Chica Dorada	1992	
"Late Mi Corazón"	Juan Magán	Juan Magán; Luiggi Giussepe Olivares Gordon; Wender Wagner Kramer; Darlyn Alberto Cuevas Segura	Deseo	2018	
"Libre"		Estéfano; Marcello Azevedo	Border Girl	2002	
"Lo Haré Por Ti"		Estéfano; Chris Rodríguez	Paulina	2000	
"Lo Que Pensamos"		Paulina Rubio; Áureo Baqueiro	Ananda	2006	
"Lo Siento, Mi Amor" †	Rocío Jurado	Ana Magdalena; Manuel Alejandro	Rocío Siempre	2006	
"Los Dioses Se Van"		César Valle; C. Sánchez	24 Kilates	1993	
"Loud"		Paulina Rubio; RedOne; AJ Junior; Teddy Sky; Bigramjhon Zayas; Bilal Haiji	Bravísima! and Brava! Reload	2012	
"Mal de Amores"	Juan Magán	Juan Magán; Agustín Sarasa	Mal de Amores (The Remixes)	2013	
"Maldito Amor"		César Valle; C. Sánchez	24 Kilates	1993	
"Más Que Amigo"		Paulina Rubio; Estéfano; David Cabrera	Gran City Pop	2009	
"Me Estoy Enamorando"		César Valle; C. Sánchez	El Tiempo Es Oro	1995	
"Me Gusta"		Paulina Rubio; Carlos Peralta; Ruben McFadden; Jencarlos; Andy Bazua; LA TINTA STARS	Non-album single	2022	
"Me Gustas Tanto"		Andrés Recio; Carlos Escalona; Miguel Ignacio Mendoza Donatti	Brava!	2011	
"Me Gustas Tanto (3BallMTY Remix)"	3BallMTY	Andrés Recio; Carlos Escalona; Miguel Ignacio Mendoza Donatti	Bravísima! and Brava! Reload	2011	
"Me Quema"		Juan Pablo Isaza; Juan Pablo Villamil; Simón Vargas	Deseo	2016	
"Me Siento Mucho Más Fuerte" †		Charly García; Gene Clark	Ananda	2006	
"Me Voy"		Paulina Rubio; Espinoza Paz; Marcela de la Garza; Casadiego	Brava!	2011	
"Me Voy"	Espinoza Paz	Paulina Rubio; Espinoza Paz; Marcela de la Garza; Casadiego	Bravísima! and Brava! Reload	2012	
"Megahits"		José Ramón Florez; César Valle; Difelisatti; C. Sánchez; Marco Flores; César Lemos; Karla Aponte; Rodolfo Castillo	I'm So in Love: Grandes Éxitos	2001	
"Melodía de Tu Alma"		Paulina Rubio; Estéfano; Chris Rodríguez	Gran City Pop	2009	
"Mi Decisión"	Fangoria	Paulina Rubio; Ignacio Canut Guillen; Juan Sueiro; Olvido Gara	Non-album single	2023	
"Mi Nuevo Vicio" †	Morat	Juan Pablo Villamil; Juan Pablo Isaza; Alejandro Posada; Simón Vargas	Deseo	2016	
"Mía"		Emilio Estefan; Tony Mardini; Ricardo Gaitán; Alberto Gaitán; Tom McWilliams	Pau-Latina	2004	
"Miedo"		Paulina Rubio; César Valle	Planeta Paulina	1996	
"Miel y Sal"		Karla Aponte; César Lemus; Marcello Azevedo	Planeta Paulina	1996	
"Miénteme una Vez Más"		Marc Nelkin; Maria Christensen; Jonnie "Most" Davis; Sebastian Schon	Ananda	2006	
"Mío"		José Ramón Florez; César Valle	La Chica Dorada	1992	
"Mírame a los Ojos"		Alejandro A. García Abad; Marcello Azevedo	Paulina	2000	
"My Friend, Mi Amigo"		Paulina Rubio; Andres Levin; Ileana Padrón	Pau-Latina	2004	
"N.O."		Eric Sanicola; Brooke Ross; Gustavo Celis; Nika García	Ananda	2006	
"Nada De Ti"		Marco Flores	El Tiempo Es Oro	1995	
"Nada Fue un Error"	Coti; Julieta Venegas	Coti	Esta Mañana y Otros Cuentos (Live)	2005	
"Nada Puede Cambiarme"		Fernando Montesinos	Ananda	2006	
"Nada Puedes Hacer"		César Valle; C. Sánchez; Don Matamoros	24 Kilates	1993	
"Nena" †	Miguel Bosé	Elio Aldrighetti; V. Ierovante; Miguel Bosé Dominguín	Papito	2007	
"Ni Rosas Ni Juguetes"		Noel Schajris; Claudia Brant; Gian Marco	Gran City Pop	2009	
"Ni Rosas Ni Juguetes (Banda)"	Jenni Rivera	Noel Schajris; Claudia Brant; Gian Marco	Non-album single	2009	
"Ni Rosas Ni Juguetes (Mr. 305 Remix)"	Pitbull	Noel Schajris; Claudia Brant; Gian Marco; Armando Pérez	Non-album single	2009	
"Ni una Sola Palabra"		Xabier San Martín Beldarrain	Ananda	2006	
"Nieva, Nieva"		César Valle; C. Sánchez	24 Kilates	1993	
"No al Alguacil"	Gloria Trevi	Gloria Trevi; Paulina Rubio; Sebastian Jacome; Kasia Livingston	Gloria	2011	
"No Es Mi Culpa"		Paulina Rubio; Patrick A. Ingunza; Gabriel E. González; Viviana C. Nava Ochoa	Non-album single	2023	
"No Más Traiciones"	Vallin	Sergio Vallín	Bendito Entre Las Mujeres	2009	
"No Me Olvides"		Carolina Cortés; José Luis Campuzano	El Tiempo Es Oro	1995	
"No Te Cambio"		Juanes	Ananda	2006	
"Not That Kind of Girl" ≠		Christian De Walden; Jodi Marr	Border Girl	2002	
"Ojalá" †		Marco Antonio Solís	Pau-Latina	2004	
"Olvídate de Mí"		Paulina Rubio; Casadiego	Brava!	2011	
"Only for You" ≠		Marco Flores	I'm So in Love: Grandes Éxitos	2001	
"Open Up Your Heart" ≠		César Lemos; Karla Aponte; Rodolfo Castillo	I'm So in Love: Grandes Éxitos	2001	
"Otra Vez"	Coti	Coti	Esta Mañana y Otros Cuentos (Live)	2005	
"Perros"		Jorge Villamizar; Xandra Uribe	Pau-Latina	2004	
"Pobre Niña Rica"		Marco Flores	Maxisingle	1995	
"Pobre Niña Rica"		Graciella Carballo; Mario Pupparo; Marco Flores	Planeta Paulina	1996	
"Propiedad Privada"		Paulina Rubio; Eduardo Bladinieres; Gilberto Elguezábal; Marcela de la Garza	Non-album single	2023	
"Que Estuvieras Aquí"		Paulina Rubio; Marcela de la Garza; Julio Reyes Copello; Juan Pablo Vega	Brava!	2011	
"Qué Me Voy a Quedar"		Coti; Julieta Venegas	Ananda	2006	
"Quiero Cambiarme"		Emilio Estefan; Ricardo Gaitán; Alberto Gaitán; Nicolás Tovar	Pau-Latina	2004	
"Retrato"		Cachorro López; Sebastian Schon; Sandra Baylac	Ananda	2006	
"Sabes Que Te Amo"		Paulina Rubio; Casadiego	Brava!	2011	
"Sabor a Miel"		José Ramón Florez; César Valle	La Chica Dorada	1992	
"Sangre Latina"		José Ramón Florez; César Valle	La Chica Dorada	1992	
"Say the Word"		DVLP; RedOne; Bilal Haiji; Teddy Sky	Bravísima! and Brava! Reload	2012	
"Será Entre Tú y Yo"		Marco Flores	Voces Unidas	1996	
"Sexi Dance"		Estéfano; Marcello Azevedo	Paulina	2000	
"Si Supieran"		Paulina Rubio; Antonio Cortés "Barullo"; Óscar Hernández "Oscarito"; Jesús "DalePlay" Herrera	Non-album single	2019	
"Si Te Marchas Con Otra"		César Valle; C. Sánchez	El Tiempo Es Oro	1995	
"Si Te Vas"		Javier García; Juan Fernando Fonseca; Jonathan Julca; Raúl "Alexis" Ortíz; David Julca; Joel Martínez	Deseo	2016	
"Si Te Vas (Reggaeton)"	Alexis & Fido	Javier García; Juan Fernando Fonseca; Jonathan Julca; Raúl "Alexis" Ortíz; David Julca; Joel Martínez	Deseo	2016	
"Si Tú Te Vas" ±		Gen Rubin; Cheryl Yie; Luis Gómez-Escolar	Border Girl	2002	
"Siempre Tuya Desde La Raíz"		César Lemos; Karla Aponte; Rodolfo Castillo	Planeta Paulina	1996	
"Sin Aire"		Estéfano; Chris Rodríguez	Paulina	2000	
"Sin Final"		Cachorro López; Sebastian Schon	Ananda	2006	
"Sola"		César Valle; C. Sánchez	El Tiempo Es Oro	1995	
"Solo Por Ti"		Marco Flores	Planeta Paulina	1996	
"Somos el Mundo 25 por Haití" ‡	Artistas por Haití		Non-album single	2010	
"Stereo"	Pretty Willie	Michelle Bell; Kenny Dickerson	Border Girl	2002	
"Suave y Sutil"		Xabier San Martín Beldarrain	Deseo	2018	
"Sueña y Baila Conmigo"		José Ramón Florez; Giralt Florez	Baila Conmigo	1992	
"Sueño de Cristal"		Marco Flores	Planeta Paulina	1996	
"Tal Vez, Quizá"		Armando Manzanero	Paulina	2000	
"Tan Sola"		Estéfano; Marcello Azevedo	Paulina	2000	
"Te Daría Mi Vida"		César Valle; C. Sánchez	El Tiempo Es Oro	1995	
"Te Quise Tanto"		Coti; Andahí; Adrián Schinoff	Pau-Latina	2004	
"Te Quise y Te Quiero"		Mauricio Rengifo; Juan Pablo Isaza; Juan Pablo Villamil	Deseo *	2019	
"The Last Goodbye" ≠		Estéfano; Jodi Marr	Border Girl	2002	
"The One You Love"		Troy Verges; Brett James	Border Girl	2002	
"Todo Mi Amor" ±		Troy Verges; Brett James; Luis Gómez-Escolar	Border Girl	2002	
"Tú Sólo Tú"		C. Sánchez; Don Matamoros	24 Kilates	1993	
"Tú y Yo"		Marco Flores; K.C. Porter	Planeta Paulina	1996	
"Tú y Yo"		Paulina Rubio; C. "Tricky" Stewart; Marcelo Brestovoy	Ananda	2006	
"Tú y Yo"	Raymix	Paulina Rubio; Yasmil Marrufo; Jorge Luis Chacín; Edmundo Gómez Moreno	Te Voy a Conquistar	2020	
"Un Beso y una Flor" †		José Luis Armenteros; Pablo Herrero; Jacobo Calderón	Niño Bravo – 40 Años Con Niño	2009	
"Un Día Gris"		César Valle; C. Sánchez	El Tiempo Es Oro	1995	
"Una Historia Más"		Paulina Rubio; Marco Flores	Planeta Paulina	1996	
"Undeniable"		Jodi Marr; Rodolfo Castillo; Sindre Hotvedt	Border Girl	2002	
"Vive El Verano"		Ignacio Ballesteros; Richard Daniel Roman; Marc Martin; Santi Maspons	Paulina	2000	
"Volvamos a Empezar"		Paulina Rubio; Marcela de la Garza; Julio Reyes Copello; Casadiego	Brava!	2011	
"Volverás"		Angie Chirino; Tim Mitchell; Clay Ostwald	Pau-Latina	2004	
"Vuelve"	Juan Magán; DCS	Carlos Peralta; Darlyn Cuevas	The King Is Back (#LatinIBIZAte)	2015	
"Vuelve Junto a Mí"		César Valle; C. Sánchez	24 Kilates	1993	
"When You Say Nothing At All (Spanglish Version)"	Ronan Keating	Paul Overstreet; Don Alan Schlitz	Turn It On	2003	
"Xico: Semilla de Paz"		Carlos Alberto Sánchez Azcuaga	Non-album single	2021	
"Y Yo Sigo Aquí"		Estéfano; Marcello Azevedo	Paulina	2000	
"Ya Fue"		Paulina Rubio; Coti; Diego Olivero	Gran City Pop	2009	
"Ya No Me Engañas"		Xabier San Martín Beldarrain	Deseo *	2019	
"Yo No Soy Esa Mujer"		Christian De Walden; Ralf Stemmann; Marcello Azevedo	Paulina	2000	
"Yo Soy"		Paulina Rubio; Felipe González Abad; Andrés Castro; Valentina Rico; Omar Luis Sabino; Andy Clay	Non-album single	2021	

== Timbiriche ==
Paulina Rubio was one of the founding members of Mexican children/teen pop band Timbiriche since 1982 until her departure in 1991. She recorded 10 studio albums with the band plus a live album from their first reunion tour in 1999.

Released songs recorded by Paulina Rubio as a member of Timbiriche
Song	Other performer(s)	Writer(s)	Originating album	Year	Ref.
"Acelerar"		Anahí Van; Guillermo Méndez Guiu	Timbiriche IX	1988	
"Adiós a la Escuela"			Disco Ruido	1983	
"Alma Máter"			Vaselina	1984	
"Ámame Hasta con los Dientes"		Anahí Van; Guillermo Méndez Guiu	Timbiriche VIII	1988	
"Amanda"		Amparo Rubín; Guillermo Méndez Guiu	Timbiriche IX	1988	
"Amazona"		Anahí Van; Guillermo Méndez Guiu	Timbiriche VIII	1988	
"Amor Para Ti"		Pedro Damián; Guillermo Méndez Guiu	Timbiriche	1982	
"Amor Primero"			Vaselina	1984	
"Ay del Chiquirritín"			Esta Navidad	1987	
"Baile del Sapo"		Richard O'Brien Luis de Llano	En Concierto	1983	
"Baile Escolar"			Vaselina	1984	
"Basta Ya"		Anahí Van; Guillermo Méndez Guiu	Timbiriche IX	1988	
"Besos de Ceniza"		Kiko Campos; Fernando Riba	Timbiriche VII	1987	
"Chica Alborotada"		Frank S. Slay Bob Crewe Viscariello J. Glez	En Concierto	1983	
"Chispita"		Álvaro Dávila; Guillermo Méndez Guiu	La Banda Timbiriche	1982	
"Cocorito"		Enzo Feliciati; Foschini; Ceroni; BOSE	La Banda Timbiriche	1982	
"Cómo Te Diré"		Anahí Van; Guillermo Méndez Guiu	Timbiriche X	1990	
"Como Tú"			Disco Ruido	1983	
"Con Todos Menos Conmigo"		Roberto Guido Vitale	Timbiriche VII	1987	
"Concierto de Rock"		Marco Flores La Banda Jerez	Timbiriche Rock Show	1985	
"Confidente de Secundaria"		Lewis Hargrave	En Concierto	1983	
"Corro, Vuelo, Me Acelero"		Amparo Rubín	Timbiriche Rock Show	1985	
"Cosas Peores"			Vaselina	1984	
"Dime"		José Luis Perales	Timbiriche Rock Show	1985	
"Disco Ruido"		Enzo Feliciati; BOSE	Disco Ruido	1983	
"El Autocinema"			Vaselina	1984	
"El Gato Rocanrolero"		Anahí Van; Guillermo Méndez Guiu	Timbiriche	1982	
"El Pregonero"		Álvaro Dávila; Guillermo Méndez Guiu	Timbiriche	1982	
"El Ratón"			Vaselina	1984	
"El Rock Nació Conmigo"			Vaselina	1984	
"Eres un Milagro"		Anahí Van; Guillermo Méndez Guiu	Timbiriche X	1990	
"Escapar de Ti"		Anahí Van; Guillermo Méndez Guiu	Timbiriche X	1990	
"Está Despierto"			El Concierto	1999	
"Esta Navidad"	La Hermandad		Esta Navidad	1987	
"Fin de Semana"		Amparo Rubín; Guillermo Méndez Guiu	Timbiriche	1982	
"Flash"		Kiko Campos; Fernando Riba	Quinceañera	1988	
"Flechado Estoy"			Vaselina	1984	
"Freddy Mi Amor"			Vaselina	1984	
"Gordita"			Disco Ruido	1983	
"Hay Lluvia en la Noche del Baile"			Vaselina	1984	
"Hay Que Entrenar"			Disco Ruido	1983	
"Historia de..."			Disco Ruido	1983	
"Historia de Amor"		Anahí Van; Guillermo Méndez Guiu	Timbiriche X	1990	
"Hoy Tengo Que Decirte Papá"		Pedro Damián; Guillermo Méndez Guiu	Timbiriche	1982	
"Imagina"		John Lennon Pedro Damián (adaptation)	En Concierto	1983	
"Iremos Juntos"			Vaselina	1984	
"Irresistible"		Anahí Van; Guillermo Méndez Guiu	Timbiriche IX	1988	
"Junto a Ti"		Anahí Van; Guillermo Méndez Guiu	Timbiriche IX	1988	
"Juntos"		Marco Flores La Banda Jerez	Timbiriche Rock Show	1985	
"La Banda Timbiriche"		Enzo Feliciati; Foschini; BOSE	La Banda Timbiriche	1982	
"La Fuerza del Amor"			El Concierto	1999	
"La Vida Es Mejor Cantando"		Pedro Damián; Guillermo Méndez Guiu	La Banda Timbiriche	1982	
"Lo Pensé Muy Bien"			Disco Ruido	1983	
"Lo Quiero"		Marco Flores	Timbiriche VIII	1988	
"Los Tristones"			Vaselina	1984	
"Lucila"		R. Penniman A. Collins	En Concierto	1983	
"Luna Llena"		J.V. Sahrenkrog; Peteasen; Carlo Karges; Marco Flores; La Banda Jerez	Non-album single	1987	
"Mágico Amor"		Kiko Campos; Fernando Riba	Timbiriche VII	1987	
"Mamá"		Amparo Rubín; Guillermo Méndez Guiu	La Banda Timbiriche	1982	
"Más Que un Amigo"		Carlos Lara Galván; Jesús Monárrez	Timbiriche VII	1987	
"Máscaras"		J.V. Sahrenkrog; Peteasen; Carlo Karges; Marco Flores; La Banda Jerez	Timbiriche VIII	1988	
"Me Estoy Volviendo Loca"		Anahí Van; Guillermo Méndez Guiu	Timbiriche IX	1988	
"Me Plantó"		Marco Flores La Banda Jerez	Timbiriche Rock Show	1985	
"Me Pongo Mal"		Paulina Carranza; Guillermo Méndez Guiu	Timbiriche X	1990	
"Medley de Cri Cri"		Francisco Gabilondo Soler	Timbiriche	1982	
"México"		Enzo Feliciati; Foschini; BOSE	La Banda Timbiriche	1982	
"Mi Globo Azul"		J.V. Sahrenkrog Peteasen	Timbiriche Rock Show	1985	
"Micky"		Mike Chapman Nicky Chinn Rosalía Valdez	En Concierto	1983	
"Mírame (Cuestión de Tiempo)"		Kiko Campos; Fernando Riba	Timbiriche VII	1987	
"Muriendo Lento"			El Concierto	1999	
"No"		Marco Flores	Timbiriche VII	1987	
"No Crezcas Más"			Disco Ruido	1983	
"No Me Canso de Rockear"		Craig Chaquico M. Thomas Marco Flores	Timbiriche Rock Show	1985	
"No Sé Si Es Amor"		Anahí Van; Guillermo Méndez Guiu	Timbiriche IX	1988	
"No Seas Tan Cruel Conmigo"		Alejandro Zepeda Cervantes	Timbiriche VII	1987	
"Noches de Verano"		J. Jacobs Casey Julia I. De Llano	En Concierto	1983	
"Ojos de Miel"		Amparo Rubín; Guillermo Méndez Guiu	La Banda Timbiriche	1982	
"Paranoia"		Anahí Van; Guillermo Méndez Guiu	Timbiriche VIII	1988	
"Pasos"		Jesús Domínguez; Guillermo Méndez Guiu	Timbiriche IX	1988	
"Payasos"		Silvia Pasquel (Spanish adaptation)	En Concierto	1983	
"Persecución en la Ciudad"		Amparo Rubín Tagle	Timbiriche VII	1987	
"Pólvora"		Ray Charles Chucho González	En Concierto	1983	
"Popotitos"		Larry Williams	En Concierto	1983	
"Por Ti"		Omar Jasso; Samuel Zarzosa; Raúl G. Biestro	Los Clásicos de Timbiriche	1989	
"Por Tu Amor"		Álvaro Dávila; Guillermo Méndez Guiu	La Banda Timbiriche	1982	
"Presentación"		Marco Flores La Banda Jerez	Timbiriche Rock Show	1985	
"Princesa Tibetana"		Anahí Van; Guillermo Méndez Guiu	Timbiriche X	1990	
"Problema"		Lindsay Buckingham Luis de Llano	En Concierto	1983	
"Quinceañera"		Álvaro Dávila; Guillermo Méndez Guiu	Quinceañera	1988	
"Rayo Rebelde"			Vaselina	1984	
"Reina de la Fiesta"			Vaselina	1984	
"Reprise de Sandra Dee"			Vaselina	1984	
"Rocanrolero Soy"			Disco Ruido	1983	
"Rock del Amor"		Álvaro Dávila; Guillermo Méndez Guiu	La Banda Timbiriche	1982	
"Rock del Angelito"		Rogers Francisco Domínguez	En Concierto	1983	
"Rock del Manicomio"			Disco Ruido	1983	
"Rococococococococococanrol"		Pedro Damián; Guillermo Méndez Guiu	La Banda Timbiriche	1982	
"Rompecabezas"		Kiko Campos; Fernando Riba	Timbiriche VII	1987	
"Sacúdete"		Aleks Syntek	Timbiriche X	1990	
"Sandra Dee"			Vaselina	1984	
"Si No Es Ahora"		Kiko Campos; Fernando Riba	Timbiriche VII	1987	
"Solo"		Marco Flores; La Banda Jerez	Timbiriche IX	1988	
"Solo en Mi Cuarto"			Disco Ruido	1983	
"Sólo para Ti"		Marco Flores; Áureo Baqueiro	Timbiriche IX	1988	
"Sólo Tú, Sólo Yo"		Enzo Feliciati; Foschini; Ceroni; BOSE	La Banda Timbiriche	1982	
"Somos Amigos"		Erick Vonn; Guillermo Méndez Guiu	Timbiriche	1982	
"Somos Uno"		Anahí Van; Guillermo Méndez Guiu	Timbiriche X	1990	
"Soy Como Soy"		Marco Flores	Timbiriche VIII	1988	
"Soy un Desastre"		Carlos Lara Jesús Monárrez	Timbiriche Rock Show	1985	
"Sueño Con Volverte a Ver"		Lloyd O. Weber Tim Rice Julia I. De Llano	En Concierto	1983	
"Suma Cósmica"			El Concierto	1999	
"Teléfono"		G. Mathienson T.V. J.C.C. Slapsh	Timbiriche Rock Show	1985	
"Timbiriche"		Pedro Damián; Guillermo Méndez Guiu	Timbiriche	1982	
"Todo Cambia"		Áureo Baqueiro	Timbiriche VIII	1988	
"Todo o Nada"		Áureo Baqueiro	Timbiriche VIII	1988	
"Tú Me Vuelves Loco"		Carlos Lara Galvan; Jesús Monárrez	Timbiriche IX	1988	
"Tú y Yo Somos uno Mismo"		Marco Flores; Luca Carboni	Timbiriche VIII	1988	
"Un Día en el Campo"		Pedro Damián; Guillermo Méndez Guiu	Timbiriche	1982	
"Ven, Ven, Ven"		A.B. Waohams A. González	Timbiriche Rock Show	1985	
"Vive la Vida"		Marco Flores; La Banda Jerez	Timbiriche VIII	1988	
"Vivirás"		Marco Flores; La Banda Jerez	Timbiriche Rock Show	1985	
"Vuelve a la Escuela"			Vaselina	1984	
"Y la Fiesta Comenzó"		Alejandro Fidel; Guillermo Méndez Guiu	Timbiriche	1982	
"Ya Estaba Escrito"		D.A.R. Fernando Riba	Timbiriche VII	1987	
"Yo No Soy una Más"		Anahí Van; Guillermo Méndez Guiu	Timbiriche X	1990	
"Yo por Ti"		Anahí Van; Guillermo Méndez Guiu	Timbiriche X	1990	

== Unreleased songs ==
Unreleased songs recorded by Paulina Rubio
Song	Other performer(s)	Writer(s)	Notes	Year	Ref.
"Beautiful Lie"			It was included on the setlist of Rubio's Amor, Luz y Sonido Tour as well as some televised performances.	2006	
"Es por Amor" *	Alejandra Guzmán	Alfredo Toth; Osvaldo Marzullo	Rubio and Guzmán performed the song together on their Perrísimas Tour.	2022	
"Fotos y Recuerdos"		Chrissie Hynde; Ricky Vela	Performed at the Selena televised tribute Selena ¡Vive!	2005	
"Ni Tú Ni Nadie" *	Alejandra Guzmán	Carlos Berlanga; Ignacio Canut	Rubio and Guzmán covered the song for their joint tour, but the release was cancelled when the tour was postponed in 2020. However, a low quality version of the music video they had filmed leaked through YouTube that same year. They eventually performed the song live during their Perrísimas Tour in 2022, but the single never saw an official release.	2020	

== See also ==
- Paulina Rubio discography
