= Diego Schoening =

Mexican singer, actor and television host

- Birth name: Diego Schoening
- Born: August 5, 1969 (age 56)
- Origin: Mexico City, Mexico
- Genres: Latin Pop; Mexican pop; Alternative rock
- Occupations: Actor; Singer; TV host
- Years active: 1981–present
- Formerly of: Timbiriche

Diego Schoening (born August 5, 1969 in Mexico City), is a Mexican singer, actor and television host.

Schoening started his career in the band Timbiriche in 1981, where he remained until its disbanding in 1994. In Timbiriche, he recorded 19 records; he also performed in soap operas such as "Acompañame" (1977),"Nosotras las Mujeres" (1981) "La Pasion de Isabela" (1984), Angélica (1985), Muchachitas (1991), Agujetas de color de rosa (1994), Confidente de secundaria (1996) and Soñadoras (1998) and participated in episodes of Mujer casos de la vida real, among others and in the movie Embrujo del rock, also he was the television host of 'Nuevas Tardes" Hoy 100% Mujer'Super Sabado' . In 1998, he joined with the old members of Timbiriche Paulina Rubio, Alix Bauer, Erik Rubin, Sasha Sokol, Mariana Garza and Benny Ibarra. In 1999, he released his first solo album Voy a mí. In 2007, he rejoined with Timbiriche to celebrate 25 years since the beginning of the group. In 2009, he released his second album Lo que soy.

== Filmography ==
=== Telenovelas ===
- Acompañame (1977)
- Nosotras las mujeres (1981)
- La pasion de Isabela (1984)
- Angélica (1985)
- Muchachitas (1991) As Rodrigo.
- Agujetas de color de rosa (1994) As Tavo.
- Confidente de secundaria (1996) As Roberto.
- Soñadoras (1998) En el papel de Benjamín "El terco".

=== TV episodes ===
- Mujer casos de la vida real
- Anabel
- La hora marcada
- Al derecho y al Derbez
- Papa Soltero
- TVO
- Dr. Candido Perez
- Mi generacion
- Noche a noche
- Mala noche no
- Otro Rollo
- Familia Peluche
- La vida es una cancion
- Lo que callamos las mujeres
- Si se puede

=== Filmography ===
- Embrujo del rock (1995)
- Brother Bear (2003) voice of Denahi
- Timbiriche: La misma piedra (2008)

=== Television ===
- Hoy (1998) (Host on 2000)
- 100% mujer (2003) TV Host (2003–2005)
- Super Sabado (2005)(Host)
- Te regalo mi cancion (2005)(vocal coach)
- Buscando a la Nueva Banda Timbiriche (2007) (Judge)

== Discography with Timbiriche ==
- Timbiriche (1982)
- La Banda Timbiriche (1982)
- La banda Timbiriche: En concierto (1983)
- Timbiriche Disco Ruido (1983)
- Que no acabe Navidad (1983)
- Timbiriche Vaselina (1984)
- Timbiriche Rock Show (1985)
- Timbiriche VII (1987)
- Quinceañera (1988)
- Timbiriche VIII & IX (1988)
- Los Clásicos de Timbiriche (1989)
- Timbiriche X (1990)
- Timbiriche 11 (1992)
- Timbiriche XII (1993)
- Timbiriche: El concierto (1998)
- Timbiriche 25 (2007)
- Somos Timbiriche 25 (2007)
- Timbiriche: Vivo en vivo (2008)

== Discography as solo ==
- Voy a mí (1999)
- Lo que Soy (2009)

== Solo singles ==
- Quiero Darme Tiempo (1999)
- Nena Peligrosa (1999)
- Estás dentro de mi (1999)
- Enamorado de Ti (2009)
- No Puedo (2009)
- Amar es un arte (2010)

=== Musical theatre ===
- La maravilla de crecer (1980)
- Jesucristo Superestrella (1982)
- Vaselina (1984)
- Snoopy y la Pandilla (2000)
- Francisco (2002)
- Ana Verdad? (2003)
- Timbiriche el musical (2010)

=== Spoke celebrity for commercials and advertising campaigns ===
- Ace Procter & Gamble From 2001 to this date
- Codet Aris Vision (2003)
- Nokia Timbiriche special edition (2007-2008)
- Umano Cards (2011)

== Motivational speaker ==
- Conferencias pareja Congreso internacional Gente Nueva
- Congreso Familia DIF Cd Victoria Tamps
- Primer congreso valores juveniles monclova
- “Influencias positivas y negativas en la juventud”
- GIRA DE LA GRAN CRUZADA “LÁNZATE” CONTRA LAS ADICCIONES, SI QUIERES… ¡ SI PUEDES!
- XVII Congreso Internacional Gente Nueva 2006 “Sin Mascaras”
- Homenaje a Juan Pablo II Puebla, PueblaChetumal, Qroo
- Encuentro de valorES Sonora
- Master de Liderazgo Gente Nueva
- Congreso Teleton, Edo de Mex, Guadalajara, Irapuato, Tampico, Coahuila
- Campaña Presidencial Felipe Calderon
- Congreso Reynosa
