= Luis de Llano =

Mexican TV and musical producer (born 1945)

- Born: Luis de Llano Macedo; June 9, 1945 (age 81); Mexico City, Mexico
- Occupations: TV producer
- Years active: 1969–present

Luis de Llano Macedo (born June 9, 1945) is a Mexican TV and musical producer.

== Life and career ==
Born in Mexico City in 1945, he is the son of television producer Luis de Llano Palmer and actress Rita Macedo. His older sister is the actress and singer Julissa. He started as a technician in a TV station in San Antonio, Texas at the early age of 17. In 1969 he became director of promotions for channels 2, 4 and 5 for Televisa. By 1971 he became Creative Director, and by 1973 he was producer and director for this same company.

Since 1992 he's been the VP of musical programming for Televisa and has been in charge of production for a variety of TV shows such as: Premios TVyNovelas, Nuestra Belleza México and Acafest. Throughout this time, he produced numerous soap operas and other weekly TV shows such as Cachun Cachun Ra Ra, Papá soltero, Sábados del Rock, Música futura.

=== Legal issues ===
At age 39, de Llano was in a relationship with 14-year-old Sasha Sokol, which she later described as abusive and non-consensual. In 2026, a court ordered de Llano to issue a public apology for moral damage caused to Sokol.

== Soap operas ==
- 2017: Alcanzar una estrella with Paula Marcellini and Eleazar Gómez
- 2011: Esperanza del Corazón with Lucía Méndez, Bianca Marroquin and Patricio Borghetti
- 2010: Atrévete a soñar with René Strickler and Danna Paola
- 2000: DKDA with Alessandra Rosaldo and Ernesto D'Alessio
- 1997: Mi generación with Laisha Wilkins and Aylín Mújica
- 1996: Canción de amor with Lorena Rojas and Eduardo Capetillo
- 1996: Confidente de Secundaria with Iran Catillo and Flavio Cesar
- 1994: Agujetas de color de rosa with Natalia Esperón and Flavio Cesar
- 1992: Baila conmigo with Bibi Gaytán and Eduardo Capetillo
- 1991: Alcanzar una estrella II with Ricky Martin and Sasha Sokol
- 1990: Alcanzar una estrella with Eduardo Capetillo and Mariana Garza
- 1980: Colorina with Lucía Méndez and his sister Julissa

== Television shows ==
1982 to 1983 Chulas fronteras with Edna Bolcan y Cepillin

- 1986 to 1994: Papá soltero with César Costa and Edith Marquez
- 1981 to 1987: Cachún cachún ra ra! with Daniela Castro, Ernesto Laguardia and Lupita Sandoval

== Movies ==
1988 Cachún Cachún RaRa with Fernando Arau, Alfredo Alegria, Alma Delfina, Lili Garza, Lupita Sandoval, Rodolfo Rodriguez, Tito de Mara, Roberto Huicochea, Pepe Magaña, Arian Metcalf, Alejandro Chiangueroti, El Jager, etc...

- 1992: Más que alcanzar una estrella (film)
- 1992: Donde Quedo la Bolita with Garibaldi

== Annual TV shows ==
1982 to 1987 Premios el Heraldo de México

- 2000 to present: Premios TVyNovelas
- 2004 to present: Nuestra Belleza México
- 2005 to present: Acafest

== Musical groups ==
- 1988: Micro Chips
- 1991: Muñecos de papel with Ricky Martin, Sasha Sokol, Erik Rubin, Bibi Gaytán, Angélica Rivera, and Pedro Fernández.
- 1988: Garibaldi with Patricia Manterola, Pilar Montenegro, Luisa Fernanda, Katia Llanos, Victor Noriega, Sergio Mayer, Xavier Ortiz, and Charly López
- 1982: Timbiriche with Sasha Sokol, Erik Rubin, Paulina Rubio, Benny Ibarra, Mariana Garza, Diego Schoening, and Alix Bauer
