= Sasha Sokol =

Mexican singer

Sasha Sökol
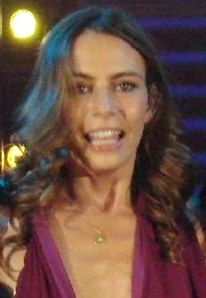
- Sasha Sökol

Background information
- Also known as: Sasha Diez Barroso
- Born: Sasha Sökol Cuillery; 17 June 1970 (age 56)
- Origin: Mexico City, Mexico
- Genres: Latin pop; Alternative pop; Mariachi; Folk
- Years active: 1981-present
- Labels: Fonovisa Records; Sony Music Entertainment; V2 Records; OCESA Seitrack
- Formerly of: Timbiriche
- Website: sashasokol.mx

Sasha Sökol Cuillery (born 17 June 1970), also known simply as Sasha, is a Mexican singer, actress, and songwriter. She rose to fame in 1982 as a member of Timbiriche, a prominent Mexican pop group that evolved from children's music to teen pop during her tenure. She left the group in 1986.

She began her solo career with the pop album Sasha (1987), featuring the hit single "Rueda mi mente," and released four subsequent albums through 1992. She made her acting debut in the telenovela Alcanzar una estrella and its sequel (1990–1991), which led to her participation in the musical group Muñecos de Papel. She later starred in El premio mayor (1995), returned to music with the alternative pop album 11:11 (1997), featuring "Serás el aire", and starred in La vida en el espejo (1999).

In 2005, she won the fourth season of the reality show Big Brother VIP México. She later participated in Timbiriche reunion tours and concerts and, from 2012 to 2016, was part of the supergroup Sasha, Benny y Erik. The group released the multiplatinum album Primera fila: Sasha Benny Erik (2012).

In 2022, she sued producer Luis de Llano over their relationship, which began when she was 14 and he was 39. She won the case in 2023, and the Supreme Court upheld the ruling in 2025, establishing a precedent that civil claims for damages resulting from childhood sexual abuse do not expire. The judgment ordered De Llano to pay damages and issue a public apology, which led to further disputes.

== Biography ==
Sökol was born in Mexico City to a half-Mexican/half-Ukrainian father and a French mother. When she was still a toddler, her parents (Miguel "Happy" Sökol Garcia and Magdalena Cuillery) divorced and her mother married Fernando Diez Barroso, an executive at Televisa. As a child, she was known as Sasha Diez Barroso, but now goes by her paternal name, Sökol. She studied at the Colegio Peterson and later at the Centro de Educación Artística (CEA) of Televisa. At that time, the music and television producer Luis de Llano Macedo was seeking to create a Mexican version of the band Parchís, and Sökol held castings at the CEA.

=== Timbiriche ===
Sökol was selected as one of the original seven members and that is how she started her singing career in 1982. Sökol recorded seven albums with Timbiriche, which earned 25 gold albums and ten platinum albums. Timbiriche earned her awards from El Heraldo and the TVyNovelas Awards. In 1984, with Timbiriche, Sökol participated in Vaselina as Sandy, the Spanish-language version of Grease. In 1986, she left Timbiriche and moved to Boston, Massachusetts, US to continue her acting studies.

=== Solo career ===
In 1986, Sökol enrolled at the Walnut Hill School for the Performing Arts. The following year, she released her first LP album, Sasha, which sold over a million copies in Mexico, making it one of Mexico's best-selling albums in 1987. Her first single was "No Me Extraña Nada", which was released with a music video. She was nicknamed "La Dama de Negro" (The Lady in Black) for her habit of dressing in said color. The biggest hit of the album was "Rueda Mi Mente", which peaked at number one on Mexican radio and remained there for several weeks. Sökol made her television solo debut in Siempre En Domingo, the biggest variety show in Ibero-America at the time.

In 1988, she released the maxi-single "Diamante," which went double platinum and was chosen as the theme song for the music magazine Eres. The title track of this EP was one of the year's biggest hits in Mexico. As the artists of the moment, Sasha and Mexican superstar Luis Miguel appeared together on the cover of the first issue of Eres magazine. In 1988, she also launched a television career with the series Tres Generaciones (TV Show) (Three Generations), also starring Carmen Montejo and Angélica María.

In 1989, she recorded a song titled "Detrás del Amor" for the compilation album Nos Vamos de Vacaciones, which also featured Alejandra Guzmán and Alix Bauer (another ex-Timbiriche). In November of 1989, Sasha released her second LP album, Trampas de Luz, which reached gold status.

In 1990, she recorded the song "Amor Amor" for the compilation album Juntos Ayer y Hoy, and the song "Noche de Ronda" for the compilation album El Estudio de Lara.

In November of 1991, Sökol released her third LP album, Siento. Earlier that year, she appeared in the Mexican soap opera Alcanzar Una Estrella II. The soap opera was such a tremendous hit that its fictional musical group, called Muñecos de Papel (Paper Dolls), which included Sökol, Ricky Martin, Pedro Fernandez, Erik Rubin, Bibi Gaytan and Angélica Rivera, released two soundtrack albums with music from the series. Because of demand from fans, the fictional musical group went on a 3-month national tour throughout Mexico and were nominated as "Revelation of the Year" at the second annual awards show for Premios Eres, where they won the coveted honor. Sasha was nominated as best actress in a leading role for Alcanzar Una Estrella II at the Premios TV y Novelas. Siento was one the best selling albums in Mexico in 1992, where it was nominated for female album of the year and album of the year (all album categories) at the Premios Eres.

In November of 1992, Sökol released her fourth LP album, Numero Uno, also known as Amor Sin Tiempo in the US market.

From the late 1980s to the 1990s, Sökol was among the most popular singers in Mexico and a few other Hispanic countries. Her most successful album has been her first, Sasha (1987). At that time, she was considered the top female pop icon in Mexico and her style was imitated by teenagers throughout Mexico, and led to the release of her own jewelry line and a perfume labeled "Fama."

In 1993, Sökol put her career on hold and put herself in rehabilitation for a cocaine addiction and an eating disorder (anorexia and bulimia). Months later, she formally made statements to the Mexican media about her drug addiction and rehabilitation. She publicly apologized to her fans for her disappearance and for all the rumors that were brought forth while out of the spotlight.

In 1995, Sasha starred in the Mexican soap opera, El Premio Mayor.

In 1997, she returned to the music scene with an album titled 11:11 (Once Once) that was released by Sony Mexico. The first single, Seras el Aire, was a huge hit and is one of her signature songs. Other hit singles included "Ya No Te Extraño" and "En la Ciudad." Music videos were recorded for Seras el Aire and Ya No Te Extraño. Not only was the album a success in Mexico, it was also a success in Spain, where it was also released. Sasha appeared on the cover of one of Spain's biggest magazines, ¡Hola!, where they referred to her as having conquered Spain because of the commercial success of 11:11 in said country. Right before she started a 1998 tour titled 11:11 Acustico (11:11 Acoustic), which was to take place throughout Mexico and several countries in Central and South America, her international tour was cancelled because of her mother's hospitalization and eventual death.

In 1998, Sökol joined all original founding members of the Mexican pop group Timbiriche in an international tour, and they recorded a double album titled El Concierto.

In 1999, Sasha starred in the Mexican soap opera, La Vida en el Espejo.

In 2004, she returned once again to the music scene, after a long absence, with the album Por un Amor. This album is distinct to her fans as it is not of the pop music genre, but one that belongs to the traditional Mexican music genre, rancheras.

In 2005, Sokol participated in the reality show Big Brother VIP and won the grand prize.

In 2006, she recorded the song "No Encuentro un Momento Pa' Olvidar" with the Spanish singer Miguel Bosé.

In 2007, she joined the original founding members of Timbiriche (except Paulina Rubio because of an international solo tour) to celebrate the 25th anniversary of the group.

In 2010, Sökol returned to the pop music genre with her seventh pop album, and eighth album overall, Tiempo Amarillo. Up to 2010, Sasha had earned five platinum albums, four gold albums and one diamond album in her solo career.

In 2012, Sökol joined Erik Rubin and Benny Ibarra, fellow members of the pop group Timbiriche, and released Primera Fila: Sasha Benny Erik, a live album featuring their greatest hits as a musical trio called Sasha, Benny y Erik. The album includes three hits from each artist, three cover songs and one new track. The unique aspect of this live album is that they sing all 13 tracks together. At the end of 2013, the album Primera Fila: Sasha Benny Erik was officially recognized by AMPROFON as the best-selling album in Mexico that year, but was only the third best selling album overall when accounting for the cumulative sales of other top albums since their original release dates. In late 2014, Sasha, Benny y Erik released their first studio album "Vuelta al Sol" with "Esta Noche" as their first single.

In 2017, Sasha joined the original founding members of Timbiriche (line up included Sasha Sokol, Benny Ibarra, Alix Bauer, Erik Rubin, Mariana Garza and Diego Schoening) to celebrate the 35th anniversary of the group. The tour continued into 2018.

== Discography ==
=== Solo albums ===
- 1987: Sasha
- 1988: Diamante
- 1989: Trampas de Luz
- 1991: Siento
- 1992: Numero Uno (Amor Sin Tiempo)
- 1997: 11:11
- 2004: Por Un Amor
- 2010: Tiempo Amarillo
- 2020: Yo Soy

=== Singles ===
Sasha (1987–1988)

- "No Me Extraña Nada"
- "Rueda Mi Mente"
- "La Leyenda"
- "Guerra Total"
- "Tipico"

Diamante (1988)

- "Diamante"

Trampas de Luz (1989–1990)

- "Algo de Mi"
- "Muevete a Mi Alrededor"
- "Olvidalo"
- "Amante Sin Amor"
- "Detras Del Amor (Nos Vamos De Vacaciones)"

Siento (1991–1992)

- "Corriendo Peligro"
- "Siento"
- "Todos Mis Caminos Van a Ti" (with Ricky Martin)
- "Justo en el Momento"
- "Tengo Miedo"
- "Cartas"

Sasha (1992–1993)

- "Numero Uno"
- "Pica y Repica"
- "Piensame Sola"
- "Dimelo"
- "No Pagare"

11:11 (1997–1998)

- "Seras el Aire"
- "Ya No Te Extraño"
- "En la Ciudad"
- "Me Faltas Tu"

Por Un Amor (2004)

- "Por Un Amor"
- "El Gustito"
- "La Cucaracha"

Tiempo Amarillo (2010)

- "La Ultima Vez"
- "Luna de París"
- "Dulce Veneno"
- "Agua"

=== Compilations ===
- Combo de Exitos: Somos la Historia (2006)
- Solamente Sasha: Sus Exitos (2004)
- Lo Mejor de Sasha (2002)
- Cara a Cara (1997)
- No Me Extraña Nada: Linea de Oro (1995)
- Personalidad (1994)
- Sus Exitos (1991)
- La Coleccion (1990)

=== DVD ===
- Combo de Exitos: Somos la Historia (2006)
- Legado Musical (2005)

=== Reissues ===
- Sus Exitos (2004)
- No Me Extraña Nada (Sasha "1987") (2003)
- 11:11 (2009)
- 11:11 (2001)
- Siento (2001)
- Sus Exitos (1999)
- Sus Exitos (1996)
- Personalidad (1995)

=== Various artists compilations ===
- Esta Navidad – Various Artists ("En el Portal de Belen") (1987)
- Estrellas de Navidad – Various Artists ("Adelante Adelante") (1988)
- Tambien Para Ti Es Navidad – Various Artists (1989)
- Nueva Navidad – Various Artists ("Adelante Adelante")
- Nos Vamos de Vacaciones – Various Artists ("Detras del Amor" ) (1989)
- Juntos Ayer y Hoy – Various Artists ("Amor Amor") (1990)
- El Estudio de Lara – Various Artists ("Noche de Ronda") (1990)
- Mexico: Voz y Sentimiento – Various Artists ("Tu Desvario")(1991)
- Feliz Navidad Te Desean – Various Artists ("Rodolfo el Reno de la Nariz Roja") (1991)
- Muñecos de Papel – Various Artists (1991)
- Alcanzar Una Estrella II - Various Artists (1991)
- Boleros: Voz y Sentimiento – Various Artists ("Sorpresa") (1992)
- De Epoca: La Era de los 80's – Sasha, Timbiriche, Alejandra Guzman, Lucero, Flans ("Remix Medley: Con Todos Menos Conmigo / Las Mil y Una Noches / Eternamente Bella / Cuentame / Timido / Tu y Yo Somos Uno Mismo / Bazar / No Me Extraña Nada / Vete Con Ella / Me He Enamorado de Un Fan / Reina de Corazones / Corro, Vuelo, Me Acelero / Soy Un Desastre / No Controles / Besos de Ceniza") (1994)
- Navidad de las Estrellas – Various Artists ("Medley: Alegres Cantada / Se Feliz / Santa Claus de Noche Vendra – Sasha, Yuri, Alejandra Avalos, Susana Zabaleta") (1995)
- El Premio Mayor – Various Artists ("El Premio Mayor") (1996)
- Sony Dance Mix Vol. 3 – Various Artists ("Seras el Aire": Mijangos Club Edit) (1997)
- Vuelveme a Querer – Various Artists ("Noche de Ronda") (1998)

=== Collaborations ===
- Hey Tu – Aleks Syntek ("Te Quiero Asi" – Aleks Syntek with Sasha) (1990)
- Eres – Calo / Sasha ("Eres: Version Original" – Calo with Sasha) ("Eres: Techno Mix" – Calo with Sasha) (1991)
- Mixes y Remixes – Calo ("Eres: Techno Mix" – Calo with Sasha) (1992)
- Realidad – Fratta ("Las Flores – Fratta with Sasha) (1999)
- Basico 3 – Revolver ("Ay Amor" – Carlos Goñi with Sasha) (2006)
- Papito – Miguel Bosé ("No Encuentro Un Momento Pa´ Olvidar" Miguel Bosé with Sasha) (2007)

=== With Timbiriche ===
- 1982: Timbiriche
- 1982: La Banda Timbiriche
- 1983: En Concierto
- 1983: Disco Ruido
- 1983: Que No Acabe Navidad
- 1984: Vaselina
- 1985: Rock Show

=== With Reencuentro Timbiriche ===
- 1989: Los Clásicos de Timbiriche
- 1998: Timbiriche Clasico
- 1999: El Concierto
- 2007: Timbiriche 25
- 2007: Somos Timbiriche 25 en Vivo
- 2007: Timbiriche 25 Vivo en Vivo
- 2017: Timbiriche: Juntos

=== With Muñecos de Papel ===
- Muñecos de Papel ("Muñecos de Papel" – Sasha, Ricky Martin, Angelica Rivera, Pedro Fernandez, Alex Ibarra) ("Siento" – Sasha) – Various Artists (1991)
- Alcanzar Una Estrella II ("No Quiero Dejar de Brillar" – Sasha, Ricky Martin, Bibi Gaytan, Erick Rubin, Angelica Rivera, Pedro Fernandez) – Various Artists (1991)

=== Unedited tracks ===
- "El Breve Espacio"
- "El Premio Mayor" (ballad version)
- "Ser Es Humano"
- "Fama" (with Muñecos de Papel)

=== Unedited remixes ===
- "Tengo Miedo": radio remix (available on 12" promo) (1992)
- "Pica Y Repica": dance single (available on CD promo) (1993)
- "Pica Y Repica": dance mix (available on CD promo) (1993)
- "Sasha Mix": extended edit (available on CD promo) (2002)
- "La Cucaracha": Iguana mix (available on CD promo) (2004)

== Acting ==
=== Theater ===
- Vaselina (Grease), as Sandy
- La Flauta Mágica, Narrator

=== Films ===
- Ámbar (1994), as Angélica
- Una Historia Viva (short)

=== Television shows ===
- Tres Generaciones (1988–1989), as Andrea (lead actress)
- Cultura en Línea (2001–2002), as herself (host)
- Big Brother VIP México (2005), as herself (contestant)
- Buscando a Timbiriche: La Nueva Banda (2007), as herself (jury member)

=== Telenovelas ===
- 1991: Alcanzar Una Estrella II as Jessica Lascurain (first-billed actress)
- 1995: El Premio Mayor as Rosario Dominguez (lead actress)
- 1999: La Vida en el Espejo as Gabriela Muñoz (lead actress)
- 2002: El País de las Mujeres as Ana (lead actress)
