= Timbiriche VII =

Studio album by Timbiriche
- Released: June 29, 1987
- Recorded: 1986
- Genre: Latin pop; pop rock; dance-pop
- Length: 36:17
- Label: Melody
- Producer: Fernando Riba; Kiko Campos; Raúl González

Timbiriche chronology
Timbiriche Rock Show (1985)	Timbiriche VII (1987)	Timbiriche VIII & IX (1988)

Singles from Timbiriche VII
- 1. "Mírame (Cuestión de Tiempo)" Released: 1987; 2. "Besos de Ceniza" Released: 1987; 3. "Con Todos Menos Conmigo" Released: 1987; 4. "Si No Es Ahora" Released: 1987

Timbiriche VII (also known as Rompecabezas) is the seventh studio album by Mexican pop group Timbiriche, released on June 29, 1987, by Discos Melody. At the time, the group consisted of Paulina Rubio, Alix Bauer, Mariana Garza, Eduardo Capetillo, Erik Rubin, Diego Schoening and Thalía Sodi, who joined as a replacement for Sasha Sökol. The album marked Thalía's debut with the band; that same year, she also appeared in the telenovela Quinceañera.

The album became Timbiriche's most commercially successful release, selling over one million copies. It spawned several hit singles, including "Con Todos Menos Conmigo" and "Mírame (Cuestión de Tiempo)".

== Background and production ==
After the release of the album Timbiriche Rock Show, which earned the group a gold record, the member of the group Sasha announced her departure to start her solo career, the producer of the group Luis de Llano invited the singer Thalía, whom he knew since the time of the Din Din group and the musical Vaselina, in which Thalía replaced Sasha in some performances, to replace the singer. The group was formed by: Eduardo Capetillo, Thalía, Diego Schoening, Erik Rubín, Paulina Rubio, Alix Bauer and Mariana Garza. For the production of the album were chosen Fernando Riba, Kiko Campos and Raul Gonzáles Biestro.

== Singles and commercial permofance ==
A year before the album's release, while Sasha was still a member, the group issued the song "No Seas Tan Cruel", which was later included on the album. The album's lead single, "Mírame", peaked at number four on the Notitas Musicales chart. The second single, "Besos de Ceniza", entered the Mexican charts while "Mírame" was still performing well; it reached number one, becoming the album's biggest hit. The third single, "Con Todos Menos Conmigo", reached number nine on the charts. The song later became popular in Brazil through a cover by the group Dominó, also titled "Con Todos Menos Conmigo". The fourth and final single, "Si No Es Ahora", reached number six in Mexico. Concurrently with the album's release, member Thalía starred in Televisa's telenovela Quinceañera; for its soundtrack the group recorded the title track, which reached number two on the charts.

On May 15, 1988, the Notitas Musicales magazine reported that the album sold 800,000 in Mexico, four months later on September 16, 1988 Mexican magazine Eres published that the album surpassed the 1 million copies sold becoming one of the best selling Mexican albums of all time.

== Track listing ==
Original 1987 release
No.	Title	Writer(s)	Vocals	Length
1.	"Rompecabezas"	Fernando Riba, Kiko Campos	All members	2:49
2.	"Besos de Ceniza"	Campos, Alex Zepeda	Mariana Garza	2:53
3.	"Con Todos Menos Conmigo"	Riba, Campos	Erik Rubin, Eduardo Capetillo and Diego Schoening	2:59
4.	"Mírame (Cuestión de Tiempo)"	Riba, Campos	Alix Bauer	3:18
5.	"No"	Marco A. Flores	Schoening, Bauer (second voice)	2:37
6.	"Persecución en la Ciudad"	Amparo Rubin	Paulina Rubio	3:42
7.	"Si No Es Ahora" (features uncredited sample of "All I Need Is a Miracle" by Mike + the Mechanics)	Riba, Campos	Schoening and Thalía Sodi	3:48
8.	"No Seas Tan Cruel"	Campos, Zepeda	Capetillo	2:37
9.	"Más Que un Amigo"	Riba, Campos	Sodi	3:08
10.	"Mágico Amor"	Riba, Campos	Rubin	3:36
11.	"Ya Estaba Escrito" (Spanish version of "Thought You Were On My Side")	Peter Kingsbery, Riba, Campos	Bauer, Schoening, Garza and Capetillo	4:09
Total length:				36:17

CD re-issue
No.	Title	Vocals	Length
1.	"Rompecabezas"	All members	2:49
2.	"Besos de Ceniza"	Mariana Garza	2:53
3.	"Mágico Amor"	Erik Rubin	3:36
4.	"Mírame (Cuestión de Tiempo)"	Alix Bauer	3:18
5.	"No"	Diego Schoening, Bauer (second voice)	2:37
6.	"No Seas Tan Cruel"	Eduardo Capetillo	2:37
7.	"Si No Es Ahora"	Schoening and Thalía Sodi	3:48
8.	"Persecución en la Ciudad"	Paulina Rubio	3:42
9.	"Ya Estaba Escrito"	Bauer, Schoening, Garza and Capetillo	4:09
10.	"Más Que un Amigo"	Sodi	3:08
11.	"Con Todos Menos Conmigo"	Rubin, Capetillo and Schoening	2:59

== See also ==
- List of best-selling albums in Mexico
