= En Concierto =

En Concierto may refer to:

- En Concierto (1983 Timbiriche album)
- En Concierto (1999 Timbiriche album)
- En Concierto (Ska-P album)
- En concierto (Julio Iglesias album), 1983
