= Chispita =

Chispita (English: little spark) may refer to:

- Chispita (TV series), a Mexican telenovela
  - Chispita (album), the soundtrack album to the TV series
  - "Chsipita" (song), from the soundtrack album

== See also ==
- Chispitas mariposa, a brand of sparklers
