= Timbiriche VIII & IX =

Studio album by Timbiriche
- Released: May 7, 1988
- Recorded: 1987–88
- Genre: Latin pop; pop rock
- Length: 72:26
- Label: Discos Melody; Fonovisa
- Producer: Marco A. Flores; Memo Méndez; Alfonso González; Raúl González

Timbiriche chronology
Timbiriche VII (1987)	Timbiriche VIII & IX (1988)	Timbiriche X (1990)

Singles from Timbiriche VIII & IX
- 1. "Tú y Yo Somos uno Mismo" Released: April 1988; 2. "Ámame Hasta con los Dientes" Released: June 1988; 3. "No Sé Si Es Amor" Released: August 1988; 4. "Acelerar" Released: October 1988; 5. "Me Estoy Volviendo Loca" Released: December 1988

Timbiriche VIII & IX is the eighth and ninth studio album by Mexican pop group Timbiriche, released on May 7, 1988, by Fonovisa Records. It was the first album that Edith Márquez recorded with the group after Mariana Garza left to start a solo career, and the last for Alix Bauer, Eduardo Capetillo and Thalía Sodi. In 1989, the album was certified Platinum, it sold over one million copies in Mexico.

== Production details ==
In 1988 goes on sale the double album Timbiriche VIII & IX. Originally the album would be released as Timbiriche VIII, but not agreeing to choose between the 22 songs already recorded, the two producers (Marco Flores and Memo Méndez Guiú) attach all and split the album in two. At that time, the double discs were a novelty in Latin America and few artists were encouraged to produce them. Edith Márquez was about to resign three times and not record the album due to the ill-treatment of some of the group members. The rivalry between Thalía and Paulina Rubio came to blows in a presentation in Ciudad Guzman, Jalisco. Alix no longer felt comfortable in the group and at that time her parents divorced, a situation that affected her, as she began to miss several presentations and commitments the group had and finally chose to leave Timbiriche in November 1988. In February 1989 Bibi Gaytán enters as her replacement. The single "Tú y Yo Somos uno Mismo" appears in the number two position on the list of the "100 Greatest Songs of the 80's in Spanish", count realized by VH1. The song "Por Ti" was originally to be included on the album as an introduction of Edith Márquez in the band, but the producers decided to record the song with all seven members and was saved for the upcoming album, Los Clásicos de Timbiriche (1989).

== Singles ==
Five singles were released from the record. The first of them, "Tú y Yo Somos uno Mismo" was #1 for eleven fortnights in the Mexican music chart Notitas Musicales. The second single "Ámame Hasta con los Dientes" appeared in the charts while the previous single still charted and reached #2 on the charts. In the same week that "Ámame Hasta con los Dientes" reached its peak, the song "No Sé Si Es Amor", the album's third single, appeared at #9, weeks later reached its peak in the chart, at the position of #4. The song "Accelerar", which features Paulina Rubio as the lead vocal of the song, was the fourth single to be released and the second biggest hit of the album, reaching #1 for three weeks. "Me Estoy Volviendo Loca" was the fifth and final single and peaked at #4. That said, Timbiriche VIII & IX managed to be more successful on the singles chart than the previous album Timbiriche VII. A promotional single with the songs "Basta Ya" and "Máscaras" was released, but without any impact on the hit charts.

== Commercial performance ==
Although the disc is double, which increases the final price in stores, the album managed to earn a platinum disc in Mexico. According to the Mexican newspaper El Siglo de Torreón, sales exceeded 500,000 copies, while the journal El Tiempo claimed 800,000 copies. The Televisa's special Timbiriche VIII y IX on Canal 5, aired on Christmas 1988, claimed more than a million of copies were sold in Mexico only, being the group's second album to achieve such a feat.

== Track listing ==
=== Timbiriche VIII ===
Side A

No.	Title	Writer(s)	Lead vocalist(s)	Length
1.	"Vive la Vida"	Marco A. Flores	All members	3:16
2.	"Solo"	Flores	Erik	3:29
3.	"Acelerar"	Anahí Van; Memo Méndez	Paulina	3:20
4.	"Tú Me Vuelves Loco"	Carlos Lara; Jesús Monárrez	Diego; Eduardo; Erik	2:52
5.	"Solo Para Mí"	Aureo Baqueiro; Flores	Alix	2:43
Total length:				14:06

Side B

No.	Title	Writer(s)	Lead vocalist(s)	Length
1.	"Pasos"	Méndez; Jesús Domínguez	Edith	3:06
2.	"Junto a Ti"	Van; Méndez	Eduardo; Alix; Thalía; Diego	3:42
3.	"Soy Como Soy"	Flores	Paulina	2:49
4.	"Amazona"	Van; Méndez	All members	3:43
5.	"Irresistible"	Van; Méndez	Diego	3:26
Total length:				15:66

=== Timbiriche IX ===
Side C

No.	Title	Writer(s)	Lead vocalist(s)	Length
1.	"Ámame Hasta Con Los Dientes"	Van; Méndez	Erik	2:51
2.	"Tú y Yo Somos Uno Mismo"	Luca Carboni; Flores	Diego	4:13
3.	"No Sé Si Es Amor"	Van; Méndez	Thalía	4:14
4.	"Máscaras"	J.V. Sahrenkrog; Peteasen; C. Karges; Flores	All members	3:51
5.	"Todo Cambia"	Baqueiro	Eduardo	3:01
Total length:				17:03

Side D

No.	Title	Writer(s)	Lead vocalist(s)	Length
1.	"Paranoia"	Van; Méndez	Alix	3:38
2.	"Lo Quiero"	Flores	Edith	2:36
3.	"Me Estoy Volviendo Loca"	Van; Méndez	Thalía; Paulina; Edith; Alix	3:02
4.	"Amanda"	Amparo Rubín; Méndez	Eduardo	3:29
5.	"Basta Ya"	Van; Méndez	All members	4:50
6.	"Todo o Nada"	Baqueiro	Thalía	2:59
Total length:				19:14
