= Sobrenatural =

Sobrenatural—supernatural in Spanish, Portuguese, and Catalan—may refer to:

- Sobrenatural (film) or All of Them Witches, a 1996 Mexican film
- Sobrenatural (album), by Alexis & Fido, or the title song, 2007
- Sobrenatural, an album by Marcos Witt, 2008
- "Sobrenatural", a song by Juan Magán, Álvaro Soler, and Marielle, 2019
