= Primera Fila: Sasha Benny Erik =

Live album by Sasha, Benny y Erik
- Released: November 6, 2012
- Recorded: June 2012; Mexico City, Igloo Music Los Angeles, California
- Genres: Latin music, pop rock
- Labels: Sony Music Latin, Sony BMG
- Producer: Áureo Baqueiro

Singles from Habítame Siempre
- 1. "Cada Beso" Released: August 2012; 2. "Sin Ti" Released: March 2013; 3. "Como Hemos Cambiado" Released: May 2013

Primera Fila: Sasha Benny Erik (English: Front row: Sasha Benny Erik) is the first album by Mexican pop trio Sasha, Benny y Erik released on November 6, 2012 by Sony Music Latin. The live recording was taken from the concert performed in June 2012, and it includes two new songs "Cada Beso" (first single) and "Sólo Tú", three hits from each one, and two cover versions of Presuntos Implicados and Fito Paez

== Background and concept ==
The idea of joining the talents of three friends was suggested by themselves and the recording suggested them to make a "Primera Fila" concept recording with hits from each one. So nine songs are from solo hits from Sasha Sokol ("Serás el Aire", "No Me Extraña Nada", "Rueda Mi Mente"), Benny Ibarra ("Sin Ti", "Cielo", "Tonto Corazon") and Erik Rubin ("Dame Amor", "Cuando Mueres por Alguien", "Tu Voz"). They added two new songs, first single "Cada Beso" and "Sólo Tú", and two versions of "Como Hemos Cambiado" and "El Amor Después del Amor".

=== Singles ===
The lead single from Primera Fila: Sasha Benny Erik, "Cada Beso", was released digitally on August 28, 2012. The song peaked at the first position in Mexico's airplay chart and in iTunes Mexico, remaining for many weeks within the top 5 positions and becoming a huge radio hit. Before the album release some tracks were digitally released, including "Serás el Aire", "Cuando Mueres por Alguien" and "Tonto Corazon", but none was an official single. In 2013, "Sin Ti" was released as second single of the album."Como Hemos Cambiado" was chosen as third airplay single.

=== Tour ===
The tour started in October 2012 and has continued through 2013 inside Mexico. In February they performed three shows at Teatro Metropólitan", and they opened a date in the National Auditorium by April, but due to the success they had to add a second date the next day. They have played in cities as Guadalajara, Monterrey, Puebla, León, Mérida, among others. They will perform again in the National Auditorium in September.

=== Commercial performance ===
Primera Fila: Sasha Benny Erik was certified gold one week after its release in Mexico for shipments of over 30,000 copies, according to the AMPROFON, According to AMPROFON, the physical format of the album debuted in the position #1 in Mexico, certified as gold. The same month was certified as Platinum, subsequently as Double Platinum, then as Double Platinum+ Gold for exceeding sales of 150, 000 sold copies in 2013. In May, the album was certified as Triple Platinum. In November 2013, Primera Fila: Sasha Benny Erik was certified Triple Platinum + Gold. Primera Fila: Sasha Benny Erik is officially recognized as the best-selling Spanish-language album in Mexico for 2013.

== Track listing ==
No.	Title	Writer(s)	Length
1.	"Tonto Corazón"	Memo Méndez Giui, Paulina Carraz
2.	"Cuando Mueres por Alguien"	Erik Rubin, Philip Kuys, Raal Villafañe
3.	"No Me Extraña Nada"	Fernando Riba, Kiko Campos
4.	"Sólo Tú"	Erik Rubin, César Miranda, Manuel Martinez Solorio, Sasha Sokol, Benny Ibarra
5.	"Serás el Aire"	Juan Pablo Manzanero, Sasha Sokol, Mildred Villafañe
6.	"Cada Beso"	Erik Rubin, Dany Thomas
7.	"Tributo a Soda Estereo"	Gustavo Ceratti, Soda Estereo
8.	"El baile del sapo"	Richard O'Brien/Trad. Julia I. de Llano
9.	"Tu Voz (Stay On)"	Peter Kvint, Manuel Moreno
10.	"Rueda mi Mente"	Fernando Riba / Kiko Campos
11.	"Cielo"	Benny Ibarra; Memo Mendez Guiu, Paulina Carraz
12.	"Llueve luz"	L: Paulyna Carraz M: Benny, Memo Mendez Guiu
13.	"Si no es ahora"	Fernando Riba/Kiko Campos
14.	"Cómo Hemos Cambiado"	Soledad Giménez, Juan Luis Giménez
15.	"Princesa tibetana"
16.	"El Amor Después del Amor"	Rodolfo Paez
17.	"Sin Ti"	Memo Mendez Guiu
18.	"Con todos menos conmigo"	Guido Vitale; Robert
19.	"Dame Amor"	Erik Rubin, Aureo Baqueiro, Jorge Luis Amaro

== Charts and certifications ==
=== Weekly charts ===
Chart	Peak position
Mexican Albums Chart	1

=== Certifications ===
Region	Certification	Certified units/sales
Mexico (AMPROFON)	4× Platinum	240,000^{^}
^{^} Shipments figures based on certification alone.
