= Mariana Garza =

Mexican singer and actress

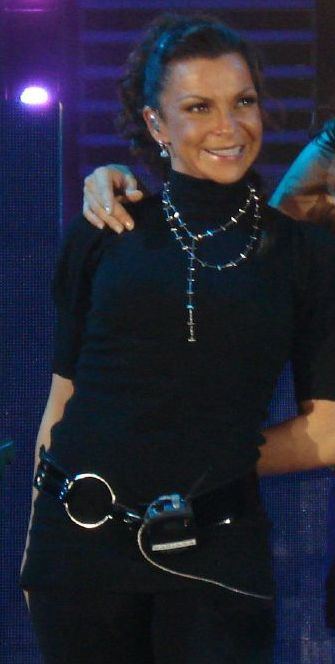

Background information
- Born: Mariana Garza Alardín; October 19, 1970 (age 55); Madrid, Spain
- Genres: Latin Pop; Mexican pop
- Occupations: Actress; singer
- Years active: 1979–present
- Formerly of: Timbiriche

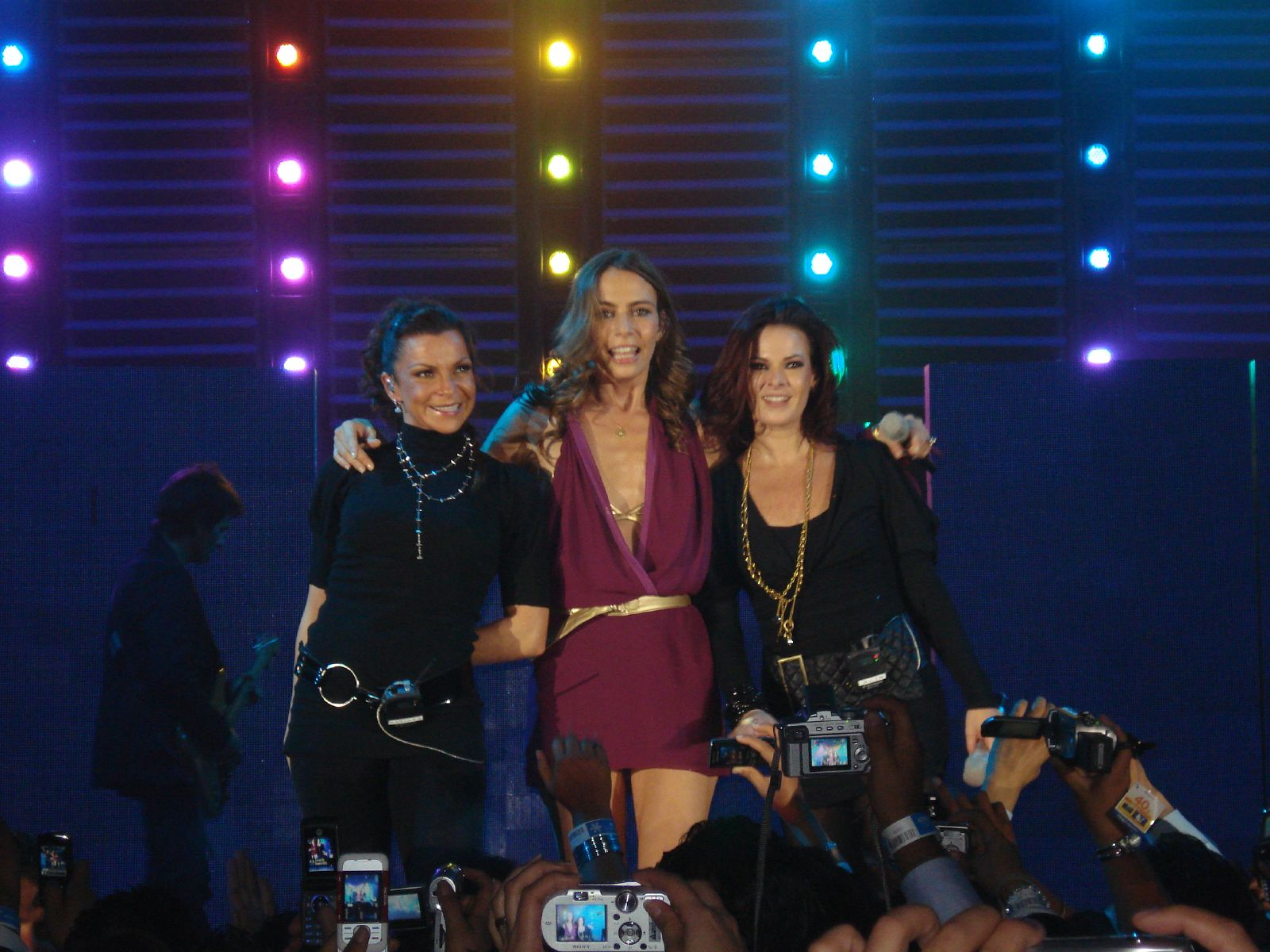
Mariana Garza (left) with Sasha Sokol (centre) and Alix Bauer.

Mariana Garza Alardín (born October 19, 1970, in Madrid, Spain) is a Mexican singer and actress.

== Biography ==
Mariana Garza is the daughter of Ana Silvia Garza, (and the granddaughter of Ramiro Garza and Mexican poet Carmen Alardín). She has a brother, Sebastián.

Her first work was "Elisa" in 1979. Next year, Mariana debuted on theater, in the play "La Maravilla de crecer". Her success started in 1982, when Mariana joined the band "Timbiriche".

In 1987, with the greater success of the band, Mariana decided to leave to concentrate on her career as an actress.

Mariana has performed in several soap operas such as "Flor y Canela" and Alcanzar Una Estrella, her big success. As a TV host, Mariana participated in the popular Mexican program "Mi barrio" (My Neighborhood) for almost two years.

In her personal life, Mariana is married with actor Pablo Perroni and is the mother of two daughters, Shamadhi (from her first marriage) and Maria.

In 2001, she released her only record as a solo artist, called "Todo Tiene Tambor". However her most remembered hit was "Alcanzar una Estrella" from the soap opera of same title.

Mariana during 2013 co-starred in Mentir para Vivir (Lying to Live), as Maria Jiménez Flores, Sebastián's mother, a "lunatic, suffers from epilepsy, dies because of tumor".

In 2017, Mariana joined the original founding members of Timbiriche (current line up includes original members Sasha Sokol, Benny Ibarra, Alix Bauer, Erik Rubin, Mariana Garza and Diego Schoening) to celebrate the 35th anniversary of the group. The tour will continue into 2018.

== Discography with Timbiriche ==
- Timbiriche (1982)
- La Banda Timbiriche (1982)
- La banda Timbiriche: En concierto (1983)
- Timbiriche Disco Ruido (1983)
- Timbiriche Vaselina (1984)
- Timbiriche Rock Show (1985)
- Timbiriche 7 (1987)
- En Concierto (1999)
- Somos Timbiriche 25 en Vivo (2007)
- Vivo En Vivo (2008)
- Timbiriche Juntos (2017)

== Discography ==
- Alcanzar Una Estrella (1990)
- Solidaridad (1991)
- Más que alcanzar una estrella (1992)
- Ellas cantan a Cri Cri (1999)
- Todo tiene tambor (2001)

== Filmography ==
=== Film ===
- Amor a la mexicana (1979)
- Más que alcanzar una estrella (1992)...Rosita
- Timbiriche: La misma piedra (2008)...Mariana Garza (Película de la historia de Timbiriche)

=== Telenovelas ===
- Elisa (1979)
- Dos vidas (1988)
- Flor a canela (1989)...Marianela
- Alcanzar una estrella (1990)...Lorena Caetano
- Alcanzar una estrella II (1991)...Lorena Caetano
- Tenías que ser tú (1993)...Santa
- A flor de piel (1996)...Mariana
- Alborada (2005)... Esperanza de Corsa de Manrique
- Mentir para Vivir (2013)... Maria Jimenez Flores

=== TV programs ===
- Hola México!! (1984) As Guest Star
- Mi Barrio (1990) As young host together Ricky Luis
- Las cosas simple (1993)
- Timbiriche: El concierto (1998) (Reencuentro con Timbiriche)
- Hoy (1998) (Guest Star)
- Mujer casos de la vida real (Guest Star)
- Dilo, dilo VIP (2004) As Host
- Buscando a Timbiriche, la nueva banda (2007) (Reencuentro con Timbiriche)
- Como dice el dicho (2012) 2 Episodes

=== Theatre ===
- La maravilla de crecer (1980)
- Vaselina (1984)
- Oz, el mago de Oz (1989)
- El soldadito de plomo (1993)
- Él y sus mujeres (1994)
- Todo tiene tambor (2000)
- Musical, "Regina" (2003)
- Yo madre, yo hija (2004)
- Musical "Pinocho" (2004)
- Sherezada (2005)
- Aquí y Ahora (2014)
- Los Monólogos de la Vagina (2014)
