= A flor de piel (TV series) =

Spanish-language telenovela

A Flor De Piel (English Title: To Flower of Skin) is a short-lived Spanish-language telenovela (daily hour-long dramatic show) first broadcast in 1996 in many Spanish-speaking countries and in the US. It starred Mariana Garza as Mariana, a student struggling to deal with a difficult life.

The series was produced by Television Azteca (TV Azteca), a Mexican company.

The show's theme-song was also titled "A Flor De Piel", and was sung by Mariana Garza.
