= Sasha, Benny y Erik =

Mexican pop band

- Origin: Mexico City, Mexico
- Genres: Pop, Art Pop, Pop rock
- Years active: 2012-2016
- Labels: Sony
- Members: Sasha Sokol, Benny Ibarra, Erik Rubin

Sasha, Benny y Erik are a pop-supergroup from Mexico. The group was formed by 3 former members of the Mexican pop group Timbiriche, consisting of Sasha Sokol, Benny Ibarra, and Erik Rubin, who are close friends in real life. With much anticipation by their fans, Sasha, Benny y Erik released the live album Primera Fila: Sasha Benny Erik. The project enjoyed much success with a national tour that started in late 2012 and continued through 2014. The album has been certified four times platinum in Mexico. Originally, the band performed 2 concerts at Mexico City's National Auditorium in April 2013. Due to the demand, they did 2 more concerts there in September of that same year. In 2013, they released En Vivo desde el Auditorio Nacional, which got certified platinum by Amprofon. At the end of 2013, the album Primera Fila: Sasha Benny Erik was officially recognized by AMPROFON as the best-selling album in Mexico that same year. If you include sales from 2012, it was the third best-selling album in overall sales. In late 2014, Sasha, Benny y Erik released their first studio album "Vuelta al Sol" and released "Esta Noche" as their first single. The next singles were "Todo tiene su lugar," "Japi" and "Punto de partida." The album Vuelta al Sol was certified platinum by Amprofon. In 2015, they performed at the National Auditorium four times (two concerts in May and another two in November). In early 2016, they released a new live album titled "Entre Amigos" with various songs featuring collaborations with famous Latin pop and rock artists. The first single, "Lo Siento," featuring Pepe Aguilar, was released on February 19. In May, "Entre Amigos" was released and certified platinum by Amprofon. After more than 200 concerts in 4 years, Sasha, Benny y Erik announced their breakup on December 31, 2016 through their official social media accounts, including Twitter and Instagram.

== Discography ==
=== Albums ===
- 2012: Primera Fila: Sasha Benny Erik
- 2013: En Vivo desde el Auditorio Nacional
- 2014: Vuelta Al Sol
- 2016: Entre Amigos

=== Singles ===
- 2012: "Cada Beso (Live Primera Fila)"
- 2013: "Sin Ti (Live Primera Fila)"
- 2013: "Como Hemos Cambiado (Live Primera Fila)"
- 2013: "Serás El Aire (En Vivo Desde El Auditorio Nacional)"
- 2014: "Esta Noche"
- 2015: "Todo Tiene Su Lugar"
- 2015: "Japi"
- 2015: "Japi (Versión Banda) (Ft. Edwin Luna Y La Trakalosa De Monterrey)"
- 2015: "Punto De Partida"
- 2016: "Lo Siento" (Ft. Pepe Aguilar )
- 2016: "Ay Amor" (Ft. Playa Limbo)
