= Timbiriche X =

Timbiriche 10

Studio album by Timbiriche
- Released: 1990
- Recorded: 1989
- Genre: Pop; alternative rock; dance
- Label: Fonovisa

Timbiriche chronology
Timbiriche VIII & IX (1988)	Timbiriche 10 (1990)	Timbiriche 11 (1992)

Singles from Timbiriche X
- 1. "Me Pongo Mal" Released: January 1989; 2. "Historia de Amor" Released: June 1990; 3. "Yo No Soy Una Más" Released: September 1990

Timbiriche X is the tenth album released by Mexican pop and rock band Timbiriche. The first single "Me Pongo Mal" was released in late 1989 and by the time the full album debuted in April 1990, the single was at the top of the charts.

Timbiriche in 1990 featured Paulina Rubio, Bibi Gaytán, Edith Márquez, Erik Rubin, Diego Schoening and Claudio Bermúdez. Patty Tanus was the seventh member during the recording of the album and participated in the initial promotion, but was replaced by Silvia Campos by the time the album was released. Despite four member changes over the course of a year, the album sold 250,000 and was certified as platinum, the group went on to fulfill a heavy tour schedule.

== Background, production and promotion ==
The year of 1988 was a successful one for the group Timbiriche, the album Timbiriche VIII & IX, yielded several successful singles and the album achieved platinum certification, selling over a million copies in Mexico. However, two of the most popular members broke up with the group, seeking to launch themselves as solo artists, namely: Eduardo Capetillo and Thalía. The producers did not give up on the band, and sought two new members to record and release the tenth album, newcomers Bibi Gaytán, Cláudio Bermúdez and Patty Tanús (who remained in the group for only six months) were hired to join Diego Schoening, Erik Rubín, Paulina Rubio and Edith Marquez. There was a lot of speculation as to Patty's separation from the group, but rumor has it that she lied about being married when she entered the group, plus the supposed inclination on behalf of Paulina Rubio that Patty was to mature for the group.

To promote an album, a promotional tour was made, which featured shows in Mexico, the United States, Central America and South America.

== Commercial performance ==
=== Singles ===
The first single from the album was "Me Pongo Mal", it was released in the early of 1990, the song peaked at #11 on the biweekly list of the most played songs on Mexican radio, made by the magazine Notitas Musicales. The second single was released months later, being it the song "Historia de Amor", the song managed to surpass the peak of the previous single, peaking the position of number nine. One last single was released, "Yo No Soy Una Más", however, it didn't appear on the music charts.

=== Certification ===
Region	Certification	Certified units/sales
Mexico (AMPROFON)	Platinum	250,000^{^}
^{^} Shipments figures based on certification alone.

== Track listing ==
The U.S. version by Fonovisa transposed tracks 5 and 10 and the original Mexican album included lyrics. Tracks 1, 2, 4, 5, 6, and 8 were released as singles. Timbiriche X, by Melody in Mexico, featured the following songs:

Timbiriche X
No.	Title	Writer(s)	Performer(s)	Length
1.	"Princesa Tibetana"	Memo Méndez	Erik	5:51
2.	"Yo No Soy Una Más"	Anahí Van; Méndez	Edith	4:13
3.	"Yo Por Ti"	Van; Méndez	Patty	2:46
4.	"Sacúdete"	Aleks Syntek	Paulina	2:45
5.	"Historia de Amor"	Van; Méndez	All members	3:57
6.	"Me Pongo Mal"	Paulina Carranza; Méndez	Diego	3:34
7.	"Eres Un Milagro"	Van; Méndez	Eduardo; Claudio	4:58
8.	"Cómo Te Diré"	Van; Méndez	Bibi	3:58
9.	"Escapar de Ti"	Syntek	All members	3:20
10.	"Somos Uno"	Van; Méndez	All members	3:27
Total length:				39:42
