= List of number-one hits of 1989 (Mexico) =

This is a list of the songs that reached number one in Mexico in 1989, according to the Notitas Musicales magazine with data provided by Radio Mil(which also provided charts for Billboard's "Hits of the World" between 1969 and 1981).

Notitas Musicales was a bi-weekly magazine that published two record charts:

- "Canciones que México canta" ("Songs that Mexico sings"), which listed the Top 10 most popular Spanish-language songs in Mexico, and
- "Hit Parade", which was a Top 10 of the most popular songs in Mexico that were in languages other than Spanish. For reasons unknown, the magazine stopped publishing the "Hit Parade" chart in 1988 and wouldn't feature it again until 1993.

== Chart history ==
Issue Date	Spanish-language songs		Ref.
Issue Date	Song	Artist(s)	Ref.
1 January	"Acelerar"	Timbiriche	
15 January	"No voy a mover un dedo"	Bla Bla Bla	
1 February	"Acelerar"	Timbiriche	
15 February	"Orgullosa nena"	Pablo Ruiz	
1 March	"Orgullosa nena"	Pablo Ruiz	
15 March	"Orgullosa nena"	Pablo Ruiz	
1 April	"Orgullosa nena"	Pablo Ruiz	
15 April	"Orgullosa nena"	Pablo Ruiz	
1 May	"La incondicional"	Luis Miguel	
15 May	"La incondicional"	Luis Miguel	
1 June	"La incondicional"	Luis Miguel	
15 June	"La incondicional"	Luis Miguel	
1 July	"La incondicional"	Luis Miguel	
15 July	"La incondicional"	Luis Miguel	
1 August	"Cachetada"	Pablo Ruiz	
15 August	"Cachetada"	Pablo Ruiz	
1 September	"Cachetada"	Pablo Ruiz	
15 September	"Cachetada"	Pablo Ruiz	
1 October	"Cachetada"	Pablo Ruiz	
15 October	"La incondicional"	Luis Miguel	
1 November	"La incondicional"	Luis Miguel	
15 November	"La incondicional"	Luis Miguel	
1 December	"Louis"	Franco De Vita	
15 December	"Louis"	Franco De Vita	

== See also ==
- 1989 in music

== Sources ==
- Print editions of the Notitas Musicales magazine.
