= Maravillas de Colombia S.A. =

Colombian fireworks manufacturer

Maravillas de Colombia S.A is a Colombian manufacturer of fireworks located in the city of Bucaramanga. The company traces its roots to 1899 when Leopoldo Nuñez Ortiz began making fireworks in Bogotá. The company is known for its Chispitas Mariposa brand of sparklers. At the height of its activity in 1994, Maravillas de Colombia had 500 employees before major Colombian cities such as Bogotá, Cali, and Barranquilla started regulating the production, use and sale of pyrotechnics.

== Gallery ==
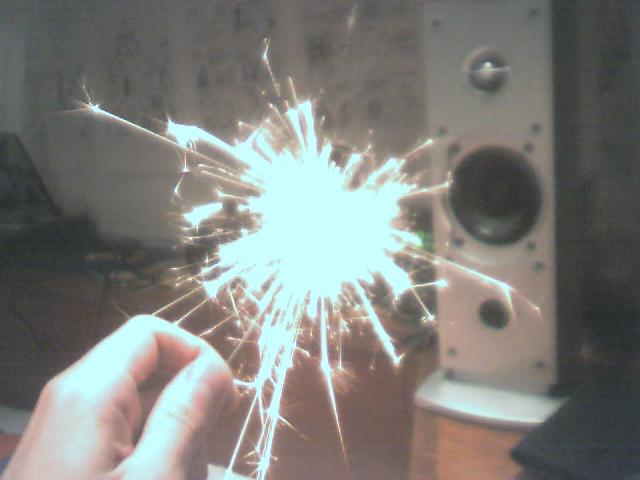
Chispitas Mariposa sparkler

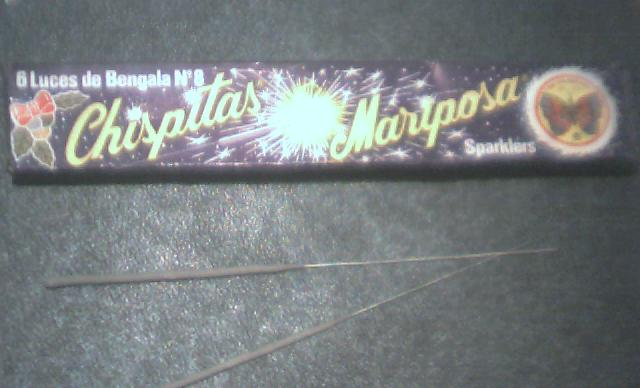
Chispitas Mariposa box
