= Yo Soy (song) =

Single by Paulina Rubio
- Released: October 14, 2021
- Genre: Latin pop
- Length: 2:49
- Label: Sony Music Mexico
- Songwriters: Paulina Rubio; Felipe González; Valentino Rico; Omar Koonze; Andy Clay; Andres Castro
- Producer: Andres Castro

Paulina Rubio singles chronology
"Tú y Yo" (2020)	"Yo Soy" (2021)	"Me Gusta" (2022)

Music video
- "Yo Soy" on YouTube

"Yo Soy" (I Am) is a song by Mexican singer Paulina Rubio, released by Sony Music Mexico on October 14, 2021. It marks her first song recorded and released by the Sony Music label, after two decades on Universal Music. Rubio wrote the song with Felipe González, Valentina Rico, Omar Koonze, Andy Clay and Andres Castro, who also produced. "Yo Soy" is a Latin pop, ranchera-mariachi-inspired and trap song which features acoustic guitar harks back to Rubio’s Mexican roots. Lyrically, Rubio "manifest" her independent self as a single mom and artist.

The accompanying music video for "Yo Soy" was directed by Roxana Baldovin and was filmed in Laguna Beach, California. It shows Rubio travelling through a sailboat with some boys dressed as sailors.

== Background and writing ==
In August 2021, Rubio posted a message on her Instagram announcing her participation in the Miami Beach Pride. On the event image, which included an easter egg with the name of the song: "Yo Soy". On September 18, after her show at Miami Beach Pride, Rubio confirmed officially the name of her new song in other Instagram post, and shared a small part of the music video, and unveiled the artwork of the single that would be released in October.

"Yo Soy" was written by Rubio with Felipe González, Valentina Rico, Omar Koonze, Andy Clay and Andres Castro, who also produced. Rubio told to Mexican edition of GQ Magazine that the song's inspiration came from "various sources", but especially from Eckhart Tolle's book, The Power of Now, a reading that made her feel "empowered", and helped her "grow. Despite the obstacles that life puts up, it strengthens me and I feel fully. " When Rubio wrote the song, she wanted to convey that authenticity that has so characterized it, although she assured that "it is as dramatic as an Almodóvar film."

== Composition ==
"Yo Soy" is a Latin pop song with an electronica beat, which features an acoustic guitar intro and mariachi-inspired strumming, harks back to her Mexican roots. The song sounds similar to a country trip-hop, although Rubio defined it as a "trap ranchero". Lyrically, "Yo Soy" has an autobiographical character; Rubio sings lines such as "No debo nada a nadie (I owe nothing to anyone) / A tus besos yo he caído (To your kisses I have fallen) / Por eso es que a mis hijos yo les pongo mi apellido (That is why I give my children my last name), referring to the legal custody battle for their children against their ex-partners, Nicolás "Colate" Vallejo-Nájera and Gerardo Bazúa. Also, the song has an empowering message. According to Billboard, "it’s all about Rubio’s independent self as a single mom and famously frankly spoken artist." GQ Magazine Mexico considered it as a song that "appeals to empowerment regardless of gender or ideology."

Alicia Civita, from Los Angeles Times, noted a similar ranchera style to her singles "El Último Adiós" (2000) and "Ni Rosas Ni Juguetes" (2009).

== Release ==
After Rubio signed a record deal with Sony Music Mexico, on October 7, 2021, the label announced the release of "Yo Soy" to fans to pre-order the song and listen to it before the official release. She also advertised on her social platforms, and announced that the release date would be the same as the release date of the music video on YouTube, October 14, 2021.

== Track listing ==
Digital download

1. "Yo Soy" – 2:49

== Charts ==
=== Weekly charts ===
Chart performance for "Yo Soy"
Chart (2021)	Peak position
Mexico Pop (Monitor Latino)	11
Mexico Pop Español Airplay (Billboard)	8
Mexico Airplay (Billboard)	26
Puerto Rico Pop (Monitor Latino)	10

=== Year-end charts ===
Chart (2022)	Position
Puerto Rico Pop (Monitor Latino)	85
