= Alix Bauer =

Mexican singer

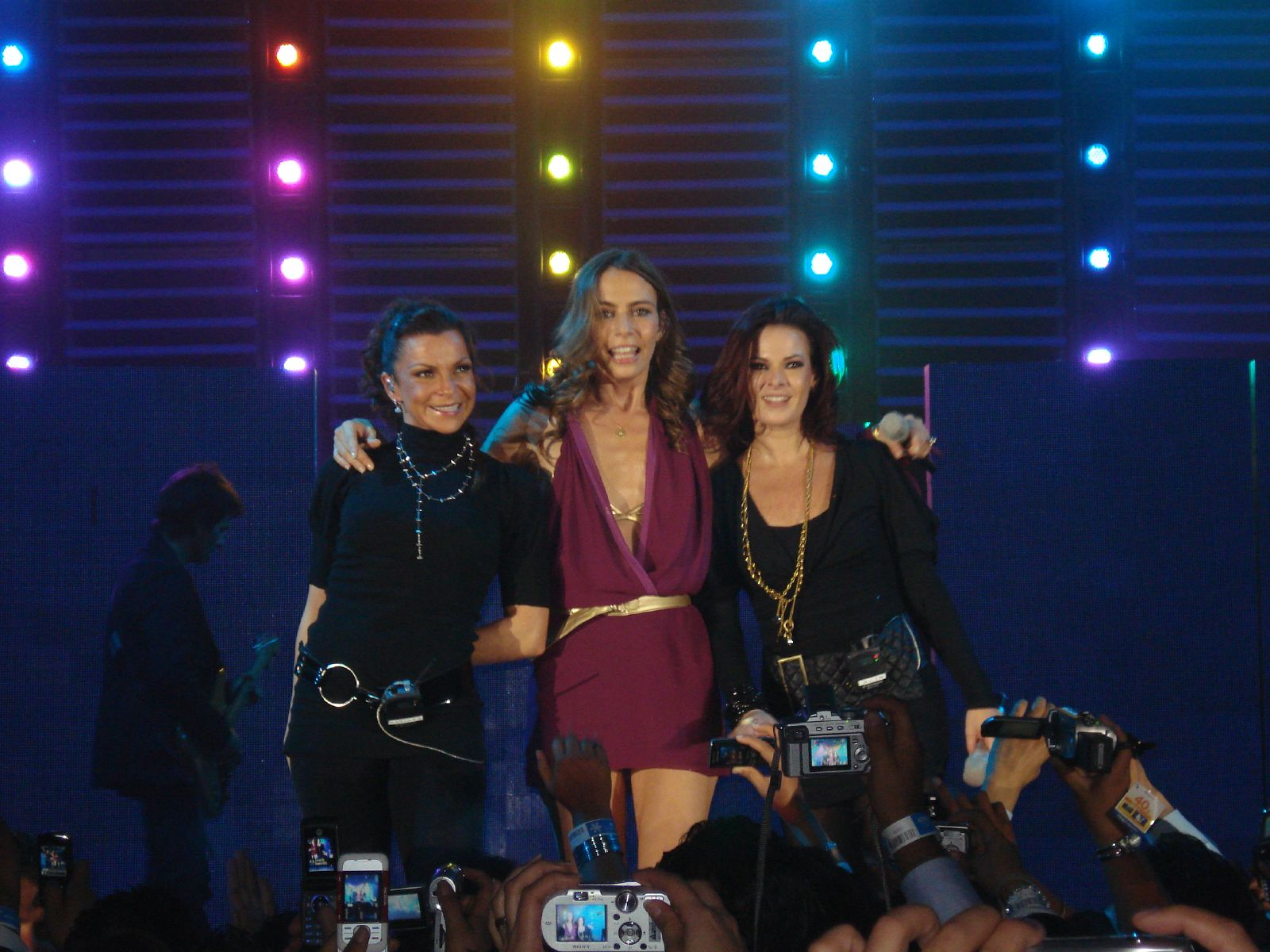
- Alix Bauer (right) with Mariana Garza (left) and Sasha Sokol

Background information
- Born: Alix Bauer Tapuach; December 16, 1971 (age 54)
- Origin: Mexico City, Mexico
- Genres: Latin Pop; Mexican pop
- Years active: 1980–present
- Formerly of: Timbiriche

Alix Bauer Tapuach (born December 16, 1971) is a Mexican singer of Ashkenazi Jewish origin. She was a member of the pop music band Timbiriche from its formation in 1982 until her departure in 1989. She released her only solo album, Por Vez Primera, in 1991, and she participated in the supergroup Giratour Pop & Rock in 2019. She also had a brief acting career with a role in the soap opera Prisionera de Amor in 1994.

== Career ==
=== 1980s ===
In 1980, Alix Bauer entered the "Centro de Capacitación Infantil" of Televisa. The following year, she performed in the play "Las Maravillas de Crecer."

In 1982, she joined Timbiriche, a successful pop music band in Mexico, during the 1980s, together with Diego Schoening, Sasha Sokol, Benny Ibarra, Mariana Garza, Paulina Rubio, Erik Rubín, They recorded 10 albums and 2 max-singles, and she performed in the play Vaselina, produced by Julissa. Her best known hit was "Mírame (Cuestión de Tiempo)" from the album Timbiriche 7. Bauer left the band in February 1989, and was replaced by Bibi Gaytán, who is married to Eduardo Capetillo, another member of Timbiriche.

In the late 1989, she participated in the radionovela Nos Vamos de Vacaciones, featuring Alejandra Guzmán, Chao, Charlie Massó, Héctor Suárez Jr., and Bauer's former bandmate Sasha Sokol. The soundtrack included the song "Siempre en mi Corazón", performed by Bauer.

=== Solo career and personal life ===
After leaving the band, she traveled in Europe and returned to Mexico in 1991. She released her first single album, Por Vez Primera, which included the radio hit "Nos Podemos Escapar." This record contained songs written by Bauer, as well as collaborations with artists including Adrián Possé, José María Purón, and others. Subsequently, she wrote a poetry book, and composites by Rocío Banquells.

In 1994, she had a role in the soap opera Prisionera de Amor produced by Pedro Damián, together with Silvia Derbez, Maribel Guardia, Irán Eory, Saúl Lisazo, Julieta Egurrola, and Karla Álvarez, among others. That year, when she had been planning to release her second album, her fiancé proposed and she left her solo career. In 1995, Alix married Jack Derzavich.

In 1998, she joined ex-bandmates from Timbiriche (Diego, Mariana, Paulina, Benny, Sasha and Erick), for a series of concerts in Auditorio Nacional in México.

On March 22, 1999, she had twin children, Moisés and Danna. Alix participated in the tribute record "Ellas cantan a Cri-Cri" with the song "La Cacería".

In 2001, she composed the song "Uno" with Benny Ibarra, performed by him. It was hosted on the radio program "El Aleph", about Jewish culture on Radio Red AM. On March 11, 2003, her third child, Mijal, was born.

In 2007, she rejoined Diego Schoening, Mariana Garza, Benny Ibarra, Erik Rubín and Sasha Sokol, to celebrate the 25th anniversary of Timbiriche, with a tour with dates in México, Central America and USA. They recorded three albums and broke their own record in Auditiorio Nacional. The tour ended on May 5, 2008 in the Foro Sol.

In 2008, she appeared in the short film/ documentary La Misma Piedra about the 25th anniversary of Timbiriche. After the 25 year reunion tour concluded, she became Fratta's and Diego Schoening's manager. She will release a second poetry book, which includes an official history of Timbiriche.

In October 2011 Alix recorded an unplugged session on the show "En Privado" in Austin TX produced by Ruben Robledo. Fratta and Santiago long friends of the singer performed with her on stage her hit songs like "Nos podemos escapar" and "Mirame" in an acoustic setting.

In 2017, Alix joined the original founding members of Timbiriche (original members included Sasha Sokol, Benny Ibarra, Alix Bauer, Erik Rubin, Mariana Garza and Diego Schoening) to celebrate the 35th anniversary of the group. A live version of the show was recorded and called Timbiriche Juntos. They released a new single called El Ciclo. The very successful tour concluded in February 2019.

In September 2019, Alix joined Giratour Pop & Rock. Giratour Pop & Rock is a musical tour that unites multiple successful music artists from Latin bands from the 1980s. Alix Bauer & Diego Schoening from Timbiriche (band) perform alongside Parchis, the well-known Spanish kids band from the 80's. Other formal group members from Flans, Los Chamos, Fandango, Menudo & MDO are also part of the tour.

== Track listing for Por Vez Primera ==
1. "Por Vez Primera" (L: Alix Bauer, M: Manuel Pacho)
2. "Nos Podemos Escapar" (José María Puron)
3. "Juan" (L: Alix Bauer, M:Manuel Pacho) –
4. "Marzo Entre Dos" (L: Alix Bauer, M:Manuel Pacho) –
5. "Mona, Monalisa " (L: Alix Bauer, M:A.Posse)-
6. "Te Extrañándote" (Alejandro Lerner) –
7. "Dama Por Ti" (Braz, Amerol, Boero, Amerio, Spanish Adapt. Alix Bauer)
8. "Absolutamente Todo" (L: J.Oristell, M: Pacho)
9. "Tómame" (Alejandro Filio)
10. "El Amor No Tiene Edad"(Ivano Fossati, Spanish Version Alix Bauer)
