= Timbiriche (album) =

Somos Amigos

Studio album by Timbiriche
- Released: 30 April 1982
- Recorded: 1981
- Genre: Latin pop
- Length: 32:35
- Label: Melody Internacional, Fonovisa

Timbiriche chronology
Somos Amigos (1982)	La Banda Timbiriche (1982)

Timbiriche is the debut album from Mexican pop music group Timbiriche. It was released on 30 April 1982. It is also known as Timbiriche "Somos Amigos".

== Track listing ==
No.	Title	Writer(s)	Length
1.	"Somos Amigos"	Guillermo Méndez Guiú and Erick Vonn	03:03
2.	"Y La Fiesta Comenzó"	Alejandro Fidel and Méndez Guiú	03:06
3.	"Amor Para Ti"	Pedro Damián and Méndez Guiú	03:04
4.	"El Gato Rocanrolero"	Méndez Guiú and Anahí Van	02:51
5.	"Medley De Cri Cri"	Francisco Gabilondo Soler	04:58
6.	"Timbiriche"	Damián and Méndez Guiú	03:02
7.	"Fin De Semana""	Méndez Guiú and Amparo Rubín	02:54
8.	"Un Día En El Campo"	Damián and Méndez Guiú	03:06
9.	"Hoy Tengo Que Decirte Papá"	Damián and Méndez Guiú	03:31
10.	"El Pregonero"	Álvaro Dávila and Méndez Guiú	03:05
Total length:			32:35
