= Edith Márquez =

Mexican singer and actress (born 1973)

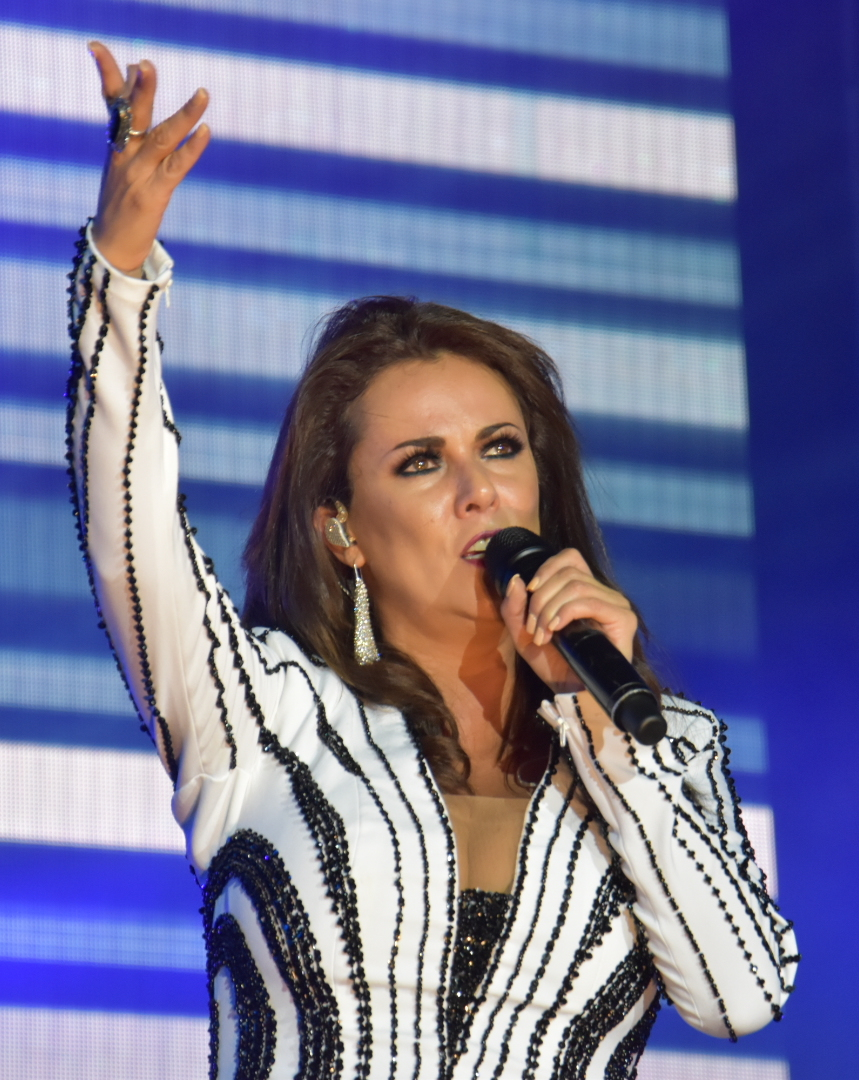
- Márquez in 2016

Background information
- Born: Edith Márquez Landa; 27 January 1973 (age 53); Puebla City, Mexico
- Genre: Latin pop
- Occupations: Singer; actress
- Instrument: Vocals
- Formerly of: Timbiriche

Edith Márquez Landa (Spanish pronunciation: [eˈðit ˈmaɾkes]; born 27 January 1973) is a Mexican singer and actress.

== Life ==
She is a dramatic mezzo-soprano.

She started her professional career by winning the television musical contests "Juguemos a cantar" (1978) and "Canta, Canta" (1984). She later attended some courses in the Artistic Educational Training Centre of Televisa and she was a member of the musical band Timbiriche.

She has taken part in several soap operas and she represented Mexico in 2001 Viña del Mar International Song Festival.

In 2003, she became the first member of Timbiriche to have her handprints imbedded onto the Paseo de las Luminarias in her hometown of Mexico City. Her handprints were imbedded for her work in television and as a recording artist.

== Television ==
Year	Title	Character	Note
1987–94	Papá soltero	Alejandra Costa	TV series
1994	Agujetas de color de rosa	Edith del Castillo	Supporting Role
1995	Me tengo que casar/Papá soltero	Alejandra Costa	Film
1996	Sentimientos ajenos	Marcela	Supporting Role
1998	El privilegio de amar	Luciana(Young)	Special Appearance
2009	Mañana es para siempre	Julieta Sotomayor	Supporting Role
2013	Nueva Vida	On Vitro	TV series
2018	La Academia	Herself	Judge
2021	La Voz	Herself	Coach

2010 camaleones

== Discography ==
- 1987, Timbiriche VIII & IX, Melody (Mexico)
- 1989, Los Clásicos de Timbiriche, Melody (Mexico)
- 1990, Timbiriche 10, Melody (Mexico)
- 1998, Frente a Ti, Warner Music & ARDC Music Division USA
- 2000, Caricias del Cielo, Warner Music (Mexico)
- 2001, Extravíate, Warner Music (Mexico)
- 2003, ¿Quién Te Cantará?, Warner Music (Mexico)
- 2005, Cuando Grita La Piel, Warner Music (Mexico)
- 2007, Memorias del Corazón, EMI Music (Mexico)
- 2008, Pasiones de Cabaret, EMI Music (Mexico)
- 2008, En Concierto desde el Metropólitan (CD), Warner Music (Mexico)
- 2009, Duele, EMI Music(México), ARDC Music Division USA
- 2011, Amar No ES Suficiente, Sony Music (Mexico)
- 2011, "No Te Preocupes Por Mi"
- 2012, Mi Error, Mi Fantasía, (Edición Especial 2 CDs + DVD) Sony Music (México) and Televisa Música (México)
- 2013, Emociones, Sony Music (México)
- 2018, Contigo, Universal Music (México)
