= Juan Magán discography =

The discography of Spanish house DJ Juan Magán consists of three studio albums, a compilation album, three EPs and some singles.

== Studio albums ==
Year	Album	Chart positions	Certification
Year	Album	SPA	Certification
2012	The King of Dance	5	
2014	The King Is Back – #LatinIBIZAte	18	AMPROFON: Gold
2019	4.0	—	

== Compilation albums ==
Year	Album	Chart positions		Certification
Year	Album	SPA	US Latin Albums	Certification
2012	Juan Magan Presents... Bailando Por El Mundo	—	50	

== Record labels collaborations ==
- 2009: Magan & Rodriguez: Suave

== EPs ==
- 2003: Logical Progression
- 2008: Juan Magan & Cesar del Rio: Midnite Rumors
- 2009: Juan & Victor Magan: A Family Affaire

== Singles ==
as Magan & Rodriguez

Year	Title	Chart positions
Year	Title	SPA
2007	"No daré ni un paso atrás"	—
2008	"Suave"	19
2008	"Bora Bora"	—
2009	"Suck My..."	2

Solo and collaborative

Year	Single	Chart positions								Certifications
Year	Single	SPA	BEL (Fl)	BEL (Wa)	FR	MEX	NED	SWI	US Latin Songs	Certifications
2009	"Verano azul"	4	—	—	—	—	—	—	—	
2009	"Mariah"	18	39 (Ultratop)	1 (Ultratip)	—	—	—	—	—	
2010	"BigBen" (Juan Magan, Victor Magan, Josepo feat. Lisa Rose)	43	—	—	—	—	—	—	—	
2010	"Te gusta"	34	—	—	—	—	—	—	—	
2010	"Un Momento" (Inna feat. Juan Magan)	46	12 (Ultratip)	31	42	—	98	—	—	
2010	"Never Enough" (Juan Magan, Rivero & Majorkings feat. Bobby Alexander)	—	—	—	—	—	—	—	—	
2011	"Bailando por ahi"	1	—	16 (Ultratip)	—	—	—	—	—	
2011	"Bailando Por El Mundo" (Juan Magan feat. Pitbull & El Cata)	22	—	—	—	—	—	15	1	
2011	"No Sigue Modas"	4	—	—	—	—	—	—	—	
2012	"Me enamoré" (Juan Magan / Grupo Extra)	24	—	—	—	—	—	—	—	
2012	"Chica Latina" (Juan Magan & Salgado)	45	—	—	—	—	—	—	—	
2012	"Se vuelve loca"	3	—	—	—	—	—	—	49	
2012	"Como yo" (Juan Magan / Buxxi)	41	—	—	—	—	—	—	—	
2012	"No Sigue Modas (Ella No Sigue Modas)" (Don Omar featuring Juan Magan)	—	—	—	—	—	—	—	18	
2012	"Lo que me pasa" (Juan Magan & Peewee)	46	—	—	—	—	—	—	—	
2012	"Angelito sin alas (Remix)" (DCS feat. Juan Magan)	9	—	—	—	—	—	—	—	
2012	"Te Voy A Esperar" (Juan Magan / Belinda)	1	—	—	—	—	—	—	—	
2012	"Tu y yo"	24	—	—	—	—	—	—	—	
2012	"Enamorada de Ti" (duet with Selena)	—	—	—	—	—	—	—	—	
2013	"Mal de Amores"	2	—	—	—	24	—	—	40	RIAA: Gold (Latin)
2014	"Spotlight" (Victor Magan featuring Vassy & Juan Magan)	—	—	—	—	—	—	—	—	
2014	"Falling in Love" (Juan Magan featuring Zion and Lennox)	18	—	—	—	—	—	—	—	
2014	"Si No Te Quisiera" (Juan Magan featuring Belinda & Lapiz Conciente)	1	—	—	—	32	—	—	—	AMPROFON: Gold; RIAA: Gold (Latin)
2014	"Noche y De Día" (Enrique Iglesias featuring Yandel & Juan Magan)	5	—	—	—	—	—	—	27	PROMUSICAE: Platinum
2015	"He llorado (Como un niño)" (Juan Magan featuring Gente de Zona)	12	—	—	—	26	—	—	—	RIAA: Gold (Latin)
2015	"Vuelve" (Juan Magan featuring Paulina Rubio and DCS)	—	—	—	—	43	—	—	—	
2015	"Por fin te encontré" (Cali & El Dandee featuring Juan Magan and Sebastrian Yatra)	2	—	—	—	45	—	—	47	RIAA: 5× Platinum (Latin)
2016	"Quiero Que Sepas"	9	—	—	—	—	—	—	—	
2016	"Baila Conmigo" (Juan Magan featuring Luciana)	—	—	—	—	—	—	—	27	
2016	"Rápido, brusco, violento" (Juan Magan featuring BnK)	6	—	—	—	—	—	—	—	
2017	"Sígueme Bailando" (with Nacho featuring Pasabordo)	81	—	—	—	—	—	—	—	
2017	"Déjate llevar" (with Belinda, Manuel Turizo, Snova, and B-Case)	8	—	—	—	—	—	—	—	
2017	"Bum Bum Tam Tam (Remix)" (with MC Fioti, Future, J Balvin and Stefflon Don	—	—	—	—	—	—	—	—	RIAA: 6× Platinum (Latin)
2018	"Le encanta" (with B-Case)	29	—	—	—	—	—	—	—	
2018	"Usted" (with Mala Rodríguez)	4	—	—	—	—	—	—	—	
2018	"Se vive mejor" (with Antonio José)	57	—	—	—	—	—	—	—	
2018	"#Idiota"	74	—	—	—	—	—	—	—	
2018	"Ni la hora" (with Ana Guerra)	2	—	—	—	—	—	—	—	
2018	"Muñequita Linda" (with Deorro and MAKJ, featuring YFN Lucci)	—	—	—	—	—	—	—	—	RIAA: Gold (Latin)
2019	"Diablo" (with Ilira)	—	—	—	—	—	—	—	—	
2019	"Bésame" (with David Bisbal)	22	—	—	—	—	—	—	—	
2019	"Sobrenatural" (with Álvaro Soler and Marielle)	92	—	—	—	—	—	—	—	
2019	"Solo Quiero (Somebody to Love)" (with Leona Lewis and Cali y El Dandee)	—	—	—	—	—	—	—	1	
2019	"Fuera de Mi Mente" (with Lérica)	20	—	—	—	—	—	—	—	
2020	"Rueda" (Remix) (with Chimbala and Omar Montes)	55	—	—	—	—	—	—	—	

== Collaborations and remixes ==
- Ni Rosas Ni Juguetes (Remix) (with Paulina Rubio and Pitbull)
- Algo De Ti (Remix) (with Paulina Rubio)
- Oh Baby (with Dero and Robbie Rivera)
- Se Me Va La Voz (Remix) (with Alejandro Fernandez)
- Sun Is Up (Remix) (with Inna)
- Lady Loca (with Crossfire)
- Hotel Nacional (Remix) (with Gloria Estefan)
- Odio Por Amor (Remix) (with Juanes)
- Get High (Remix) (with Ruby)
- Un Momento (with Inna)
- Rabiosa (Remix) (with Shakira)
- Inevitable (Remix) (with Dulce Maria)
- Manos al Aire (with Nelly Furtado)
- Yerbatero (Remix) (with Juanes)
- Pegate Mas (Remix) (with Dyland and Lenny)
- Give You Up (with Soraya Arnelas)
- Now Or Never (Remix) (with Emilia De Poret)
- Me Rio De Ti (Remix) (with Gloria Trevi)
- Enamorada De Ti (Merengue Remix) (with Selena)
- No Me Digas Que No (Remix) (with Enrique Iglesias and Wisin & Yandel)
- Kingsize Heart (with Javi Mula)
- Some Love 2.0 (with Marsal Ventura, Surrender DJs and Medussa)
- Amarte Bien (with Carlos Baute)
- El Cielo No Entiende (Remix) (with OBK)
- Ella No Sigue Modas (with Don Omar)
- Join The Party (In My Boat) (with Leticia)
- Be My Lover (Remix) (with Inna)
- Sólo Contigo (with Topic and Lena)
- Claro Que Si (with Mohombi, Yasiris and Hyenas)
- Esa Carita (with María Isabel)
