= En Concierto (1983 Timbiriche album) =

La Banda Timbiriche en Concierto

Live album by Timbiriche
- Released: 1983
- Recorded: 1983
- Genre: Pop
- Label: Melody

Timbiriche chronology
La Banda Timbiriche (1982)	La Banda Timbiriche en Concierto (1983)	Timbiriche Vaselina (1984)

La Banda Timbiriche: En Concierto or simply En Concierto is the third album from Mexican pop music group Timbiriche. It was released in 1983.

== Background and production ==
After the release of two studio albums in 1982 and a TV special that were well received, the group went on their first international tour and soon started selecting songs for the new album to come. One of the selected songs was Mickey's version of the song Mickey by Tony Basil. The track was chosen because it was one of the most popular in the tour's performances. After a break from the shows to perform their final exams at school, the group returned to the studio to record the song and then promote it on TV. The album marks the debut of new member Erik and to promote the album a TV special was made called "La Banda Timbiriche en concierto".

== Commercial reception ==
The group won the cover of the magazine Notitas Musicales from May 15, 1983, due to the group's success that year. According to the magazine, En Concierto was gold-certified.

== Track listing ==
No.	Title	Length
1.	"Presentacion De La Banda Timbiriche Por "Lenguardo""
2.	"Popurri Timbiriche" (La Fiesta Comenzo / Somos Amigos / Amor Para Ti / El Gato Rocanrolero / El Gato Rocanrolero / Medley De Cri Cri: El Ropero, Di Por Que, Los Tres Cochinitos / Un Dia En El Campo / El Pregonero / Hoy Tengo Que Decirte Papa / Timbiriche)
3.	"Noches De Verano" (Summer Nights)
4.	"Problema" (Trouble)
5.	"Baile Del Sapo" (Time Warp)
6.	"Sueño Con Volver A Verte"
7.	"Payasos" (One Step)
8.	"Micky" (Mickey)
9.	"Popurri Grandes Años Del Rock" (Confidente De Secundaria (High School Confidential) / Chica Alborotada / Lucila / Rock Del Angelito / Popotitos (Boney Moroney) / Polvora (Dinamite))
10.	"Imagina" (Imagine)
11.	""Popurri Banda Timbiriche"" (Chispita / Ojos De Miel / Por Tu Amor / Solo Tu, Solo Yo / México / La Vida Es Mejor Cantando / Rocococococanrol / La Banda Timbiriche)
