= Chispita (album) =

1984 album from the soap opera Chispita

Studio album by Various Artists
- Released: 1984
- Recorded: 1983 & 1984
- Genre: Pop music, Children's music
- Label: RGE

Alternative cover
- The second edition of the Portuguese album (1992)

Chispita (English: Little Spark) is an album from the soap opera Chispita starring Lucerito. The album was inspired by the huge success of the eponymous soap opera. The album has two versions: a Spanish-language version by Timbiriche, and a Portuguese-language version featuring various artists made by the Brazilian channel SBT, that broadcast the telenovela in Brazil.

The first Spanish edition of the album was released in 1983, and the second one was released in 1984. Also there are two editions of the Portuguese version of the album. The first one was released in 1983, in its first exhibition and the second one was released in 1992, during the seventh exhibition of the telenovela on the channel SBT. The album was a success in Brazil. The song "Chispita" by Timbiriche reached #2 on the Mexican charts.

== Spanish track list ==
1. "Chispita" featured on the album La Banda Timbiriche

== Brazilian track list ==
1. Anjo Bom - Sarah Regina e a Turminha Levada da Breca
2. Festa dos Insetos - Gilliard
3. Docinho, Docinho - Gugu
4. Vamos a la Playa - Novo Nuevo
5. Garota Sapeca - Carlinhos Borba Gato
6. Comer, Comer - Brazilian Genghis Khan
7. Music Box Dancer - Bruno Carezza
8. Baile dos Passarinhos - Gugu
9. Amigo É - Harmony Cats
10. O Rei da Festa - Carlinhos Borba Gato
11. A Família - Sarah Regina e a Turminha Levada da Breca
12. 40 Grados (Que calor de loco!) - Los Maneros
13. Chispita - Algazarra
