= Timbiriche, El concierto =

Live album by Timbiriche
- Released: 1999
- Recorded: 1999
- Genre: Pop
- Label: Fonovisa

Timbiriche chronology
'Timbiriche XII' (1993)	Timbiriche, El concierto (1999)

Timbiriche, El concierto is a two-disc live album from Mexican pop music group Timbiriche. It was released in 1999. The album is a live recording from their reunion in 1999. The album was certified Platinum + Gold by AMPROFON for sales of over 350,000.

== Track listing ==
CD 1

1. "TIMBIRICHE"
2. "SOMOS AMIGOS"
3. "JUNTOS"
4. "SOLO TU SOLO YO"
5. "ROCK Medley (Concierto de Rock/Telefono/Me Planto/Mickey)"
6. "PRINCESA TIBETANA" (featuring Erik)
7. "SI NO ES AHORA" (featuring Erik & Paulina)
8. "ADIOS A LA ESCUELA" (featuring Benny, Alix & Mariana)
9. "BAILE DEL SAPO"
10. "GREASE Medley"
11. "PAYASOS" (featuring Alix & Mariana)
12. "MAMA" (featuring Benny)
13. "MIRAME" (featuring Alix)

CD 2

1. "MURIENDO LENTO" (featuring Sasha & Benny)
2. "SOY UN DESASTRE" (featuring Diego)
3. "ACELERAR" (featuring Paulina)
4. "AMAME HASTA CON LOS DIENTES" (featuring Erik)
5. "BESOS DE CENIZA" (featuring Mariana)
6. "TU Y YO SOMOS UNO MISMO" (featuring Diego)
7. "LA VIDA ES MEJOR CANTANDO" (featuring Sasha)
8. "CON TODOS MENOS CONMIGO" (featuring Erik, Diego & Benny)
9. "HOY TENGO QUE DECIRTE PAPA"
10. "CORRO VUELO ME ACELERO" (featuring Mariana, Alix, Paulina & Sasha)
11. "LA BANDA TIMBIRICHE"
12. "MEXICO" (featuring Mariana & Paulina)
13. "ESTA DESPIERTO"
14. "SUMA COSMICA"
15. "LA FUERZA DEL AMOR"
