= Timbiriche Rock Show =

Studio album by Timbiriche
- Released: July 1, 1985
- Recorded: 1984–85
- Genre: Latin pop; pop rock; bubblegum pop
- Length: 36:06
- Label: Discos Melody; Fonovisa

Timbiriche chronology
Timbiriche Vaselina (1984)	Timbiriche Rock Show (1985)	Timbiriche VII (1987)

Timbiriche Rock Show is the sixth studio album by Mexican pop group Timbiriche. It was released in July 1985 and contains Spanish-language covers of notable pop hits during the 1980s, such as "99 Luftballons" ("Mi Globo Azul"), "Layin' It On The Line" (No Me Canso de Rockear) and "Telefone (Long Distance Love Affair)" ("Teléfono").

With this album Timbiriche evolved into a new sound, aimed at teenagers. They stopped being a children's group and became a teen group. The songs on this album and the promotional videos shot for them were more commercially-oriented and more marketable than before. The album spawned several hit singles, including "Soy un Desastre", "Corro, Vuelo, Me Acelero", "Teléfono" and "Me Plantó". The album was certified Gold in Mexico.

== Track listing ==
No.	Title	Length
1.	"Presentación"	(0:52)
2.	"Rock Show"	(3:01)
3.	"Mi Globo Azul"	(3:34)
4.	"No Me Canso de Rockear"	(3:10)
5.	"Me Plantó"	(2:40)
6.	"Vivirás"	(2:53)
7.	"Corro, Vuelo, Me Acelero"	(3:51)
8.	"Soy un Desastre"	(3:55)
9.	"Teléfono"	(4:19)
10.	"Dime"	(4:09)
11.	"Ven, Ven, Ven"	(3:47)
12.	"Juntos"	(3:40)
