= Timbiriche Vaselina =

1984 album by Timbiriche

Studio album / cast recording by Timbiriche
- Released: 1984
- Recorded: 1984
- Genres: Pop, Musical
- Label: Fonovisa

Timbiriche chronology
En Concierto (1983)	Timbiriche Vaselina (1984)	Timbiriche Rock Show (1985)

Timbiriche Vaselina is the 5th album from Mexican pop music group Timbiriche. It was released in 1984 and is based on the musical Grease (musical). It is presented by Luis De Llano and produced by Julissa.

== Track listing ==
1. "Alma mater"
2. "El raton"
3. "Noches de verano" Summer Nights
4. "Amor primero" (Those Magic Changes)
5. "Freddy mi amor" (Freddy, My Love)
6. "Rayo rebelde" (Greased Lighting)
7. "Los tristones" (Mooning)
8. "Sandra Dee" (Look at Me, I'm Sandra Dee)
9. "Iremos juntos" (We Go Together)
10. "Baile escolar" (Rock 'N' Roll Is Here To Stay)
11. "Hay lluvia en la noche del baile" (It's Raining on Prom Night)
12. "El rock nacio conmigo" (Born To Hand Jive)
13. "Vuelve a la escuela" (Beauty School Drop Out)
14. "El autocinema" (Alone At The Drive-In-Movie)
15. "Reina de la fiesta" (Rock 'N' Roll Party Queen)
16. "Cosas peores" (There Are Worse Things I Could Do)
17. "Reprise de Sandra dee" (Look at Me, I'm Sandra Dee (Reprise))
18. "Flechado estoy"
