= La Banda Timbiriche =

Studio album by Timbiriche
- Released: 1982
- Recorded: 1982
- Studio: Estudios Lagab
- Genre: Pop
- Label: Fonovisa
- Producer: Memo Méndez Guiú

Timbiriche chronology
Timbiriche (1982)	La Banda Timbiriche (1982)	En Concierto (1983)

La Banda Timbiriche is the second album from Mexican pop music group Timbiriche, released in 1982. The song "Chispita" is the title track for the Telenovela Chispita.

== Track listing ==
1. "Rock Del Amor" (03:07)
2. "La Banda Timbiriche" (03:14)
3. "Ojos De Miel" (03:15)
4. "Por Tu Amor" (02:58)
5. "Sólo Tú, Sólo Yo" (03:09)
6. "Chispita" (02:54)
7. "La Vida Es Mejor Cantando" (02:54)
8. "México" (03:00)
9. "Mamá" (03:02)
10. "Cocorito" (03:13)
11. "Rocococococanrol" (03:05)
