= Erik Rubín =

Mexican singer and actor (born 1971)

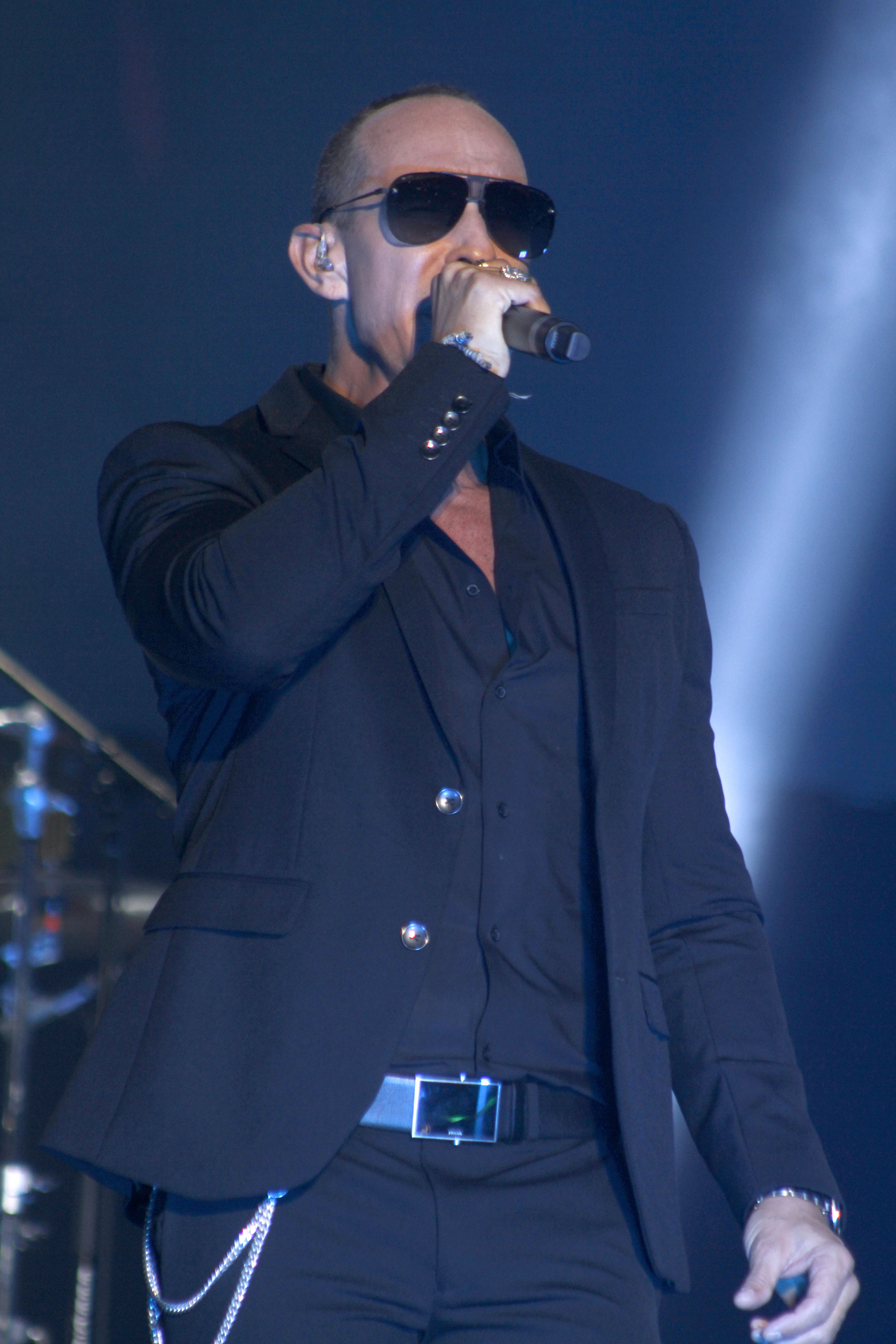

Background information
- Born: Erik Rubín Milanszenko; 30 January 1971 (age 55)
- Origin: Puebla, Mexico
- Genres: Latin pop; Mexican pop; alternative rock
- Occupations: Musician; singer; producer; actor
- Years active: 1982–present
- Labels: Fonovisa Records; Sony Music Entertainment; Universal Records
- Formerly of: Timbiriche
- Spouse: Andrea Legarreta (m. 2001; sep. 2023)

Erik Rubín Milanszenko (born 30 January 1971) is a Mexican singer and actor. He was a member of the Mexican teen pop group Timbiriche.

== Early career ==
At the age of 12, Rubín joined the group Timbiriche, one of the most important and influential pop bands of the 1980s on the Spanish language charts. His entry into the group transformed it into a septet. His first album with the group was their fourth album. While with the group, he recorded more than 10 albums, participated in several television specials, and visited various countries during their concert tours. He is best known for hits such as "Mágico amor", "Ámame hasta con los dientes" and "Princesa Tibetana".

Rubín remained with Timbiriche until 1991. The last Timbiriche album he worked on was their tenth. In 1998 he joined on Timbiriche reunion and he wrote new songs for the album El Concierto, which he co-produced. In 2002, he sang the Latin American Spanish soundtrack for Spirit: Stallion of the Cimarron. In 2007, for the 25th anniversary of Timibiriche, he rejoined the band and produced their new album. He also performed with former band mate Paulina Rubio as part of the Mexican Bicentennial Celebrations.

== Solo work ==
He has released several solo albums since leaving Timbiriche, including the Gold Certified Aquí y Ahora He is the primary songwriter for most of his solo work, and has produced or co-produced his own albums as well.

He has from time to time lent his voice to broader pop culture activities, such as Mexico's Council for Communications-sponsored campaign singing in the all-star track "Por los Buenos Mexicanos"

== Acting and other work ==
Rubín has made several television appearances as an actor over the course of his career, including small roles in telenovelas Lazos de Amor (1995) and the first season of Rebelde (2004), for which he also sang one of its theme songs. He starred alongside Ricky Martin in the musical-romance telenovela Alcanzar una estrella II (1991). For his acting in live theater, he has won two "Premios Heraldos" (the annual pop culture awards sponsored by the Mexican newspaper El Heraldo de Mexico): playing Roger in the Mexican production of Rent, and playing Judas in the Mexican production of Jesus Christ Superstar. He is also frequently invited to appear as a performer or awards presenter at various Spanish-language pop culture ceremonies, in Mexico and in the United States.

== Personal life ==
He married Andrea Legarreta in 2001 and later in 2023 they separated. They have two daughters: Mia and Nina.

== Discography ==
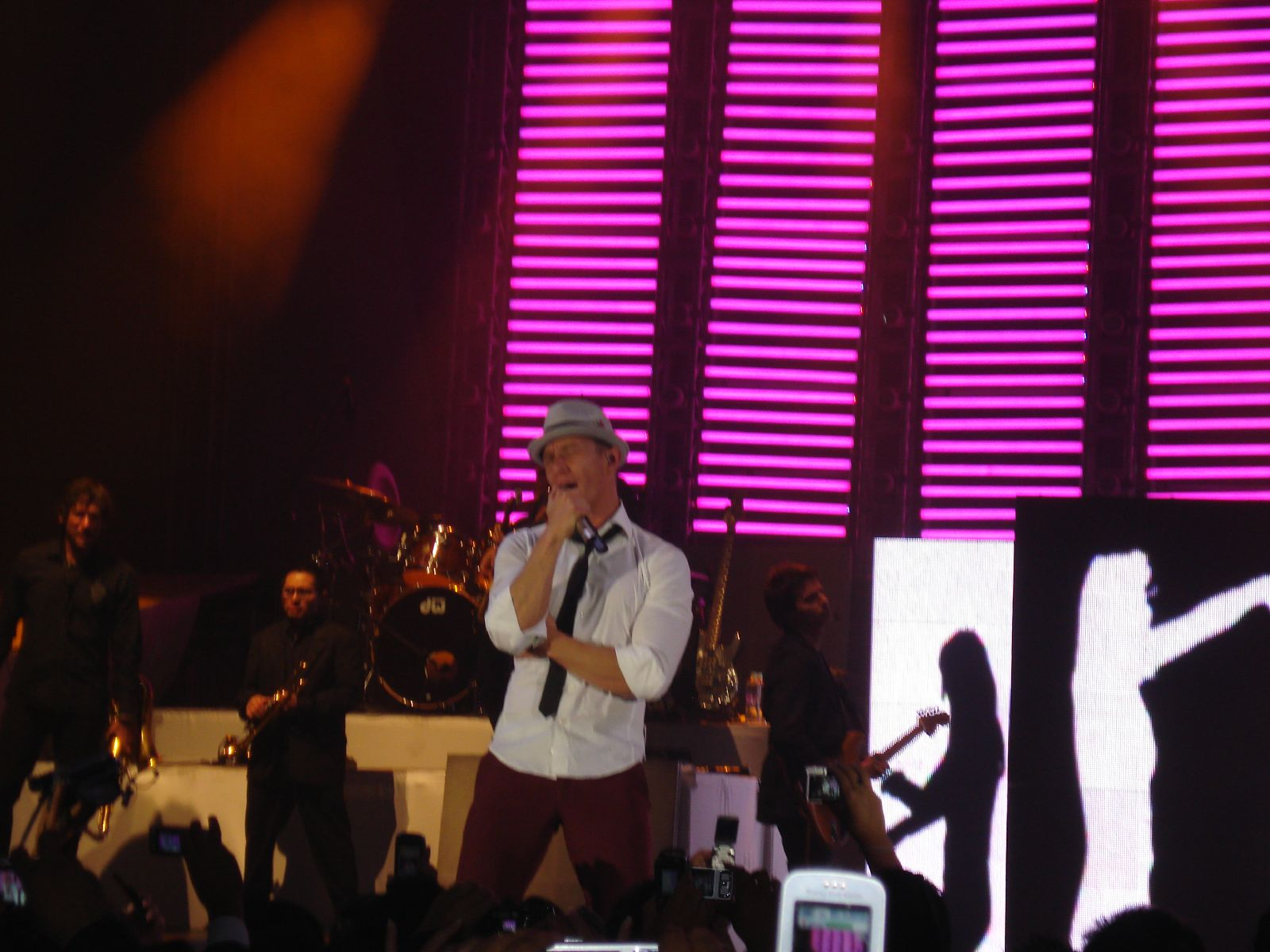
Rubín performing in 2007

=== With Timbiriche ===
- Timbiriche Disco Ruido, 1984
- Timbiriche Rock Show, 1985
- Timbiriche VII, 1987
- Timbiriche VIII & IX, 1988
- Timbiriche X, 1990

=== Solo works ===
- La Casa del Amor, 1993
- Sueño de Fantasía, 1995
- Frecuencia Continental, 1997
- Quadrasónico, 2002
- Erik, 2004
- Aquí y Ahora, 2009

== See also ==
- Sasha, Benny y Erik
