= Wow 87*04 =

WOW 87/04

Greatest hits album by Fobia
- Released: 20 April 2004
- Genre: Alternative Rock
- Label: Sony BMG Latin

Fobia chronology
Fobia on Ice (1997)	WOW 87/04 (2004)	Rosa Venus (2006)

Wow 1987-2004 is a Spanish language rock and roll greatest hits album by Mexican band Fobia. This is Fobia's first recording of any type since 1997's Fobia on Ice. This anthology compiles Fobia's greatest hits from their first five albums Fobia (1990), Mundo Feliz (1991), Leche (1993), Amor Chiquito (1995), and Fobia on Ice (1997), along with two new songs.

Original members Leonardo de Lozanne (voice), Paco Huidobro (guitar), Cha! (bass), and Iñaki (keyboards) returned, along with new drummer Jay de la Cueva and recorded two new singles: "Más caliente que el sol" and "Hoy tengo miedo". It represents their come back from a long pause of the group, the members took a brake pursuing new projects and joined to record this album.

== Track listing ==
1. "Más caliente que el sol"
2. "Descontrol" (from Amor Chiquito)
3. "Hoy tengo miedo"
4. "El diablo" (from Mundo Feliz)
5. "Plástico" (from Leche)
6. "La iguana" (from Fobia)
7. "El cerebro" (from Mundo Feliz)
8. "Veneno vil" (from Amor Chiquito)
9. "Camila" (from Mundo Feliz)
10. "Dios bendiga a los gusanos" (from Fobia)
11. "Vivo" (from Amor Chiquito)
12. "Miel de escorpión" (from Fobia)
13. "Crucifijo" (from Fobia)
14. "Regrésame a Júpiter" (from Leche)
15. "Revolución sin manos" (from Amor Chiquito)
16. "Under Pressure" (Queen cover)
17. "Hipnotízame" (from Amor Chiquito)
18. "El microbito" (from Fobia)
