= Alcanzar una estrella II =

Mexican telenovela

- Genre: Telenovela
- Created by: Carlos Enrique Aguilar; Carlos Diez
- Directed by: Marco Flavio Cruz; Manolo García
- Starring: Sasha Sokol; Ricky Martin; Angélica Rivera; Erik Rubin; Bibi Gaytán; Pedro Fernández; Óscar Vallejo; José Alonso
- Opening theme: Estrella de Ilusión by Zarabanda; Muñecos de Papel by Muñecos de papel No Quiero Dejar De Brillar by Muñecos de papel
- Country of origin: Mexico
- Original language: Spanish
- No. of episodes: 100

Production
- Executive producer: Luis de Llano Macedo
- Production locations: Mexico City, Mexico
- Running time: 41-44 minutes
- Production company: Televisa

Original release
- Network: Canal de las Estrellas
- Release: January 21 – June 7, 1991

Related
- Alcanzar una estrella (1990)

Alcanzar una estrella II (English title: To reach a star II) is a Mexican telenovela produced by Luis de Llano Macedo for Televisa in 1991. It is the sequel to Alcanzar una estrella.

Sasha Sokol, Ricky Martin, Angélica Rivera, Erik Rubín, Bibi Gaytan and Pedro Fernández starred as protagonists, while José Alonso, Silvia Pasquel and Eduardo Palomo starred as antagonists. Eduardo Capetillo and Mariana Garza starred as special participation.

Two soundtrack albums were released for the series in 1991: Muñecos de Papel with the start of the series and Alcanzar una estrella II as it ended.

== Plot ==
Eduardo puts out a call to all of Mexico's youth to find members for his new musical group, Muñecos de papel ("Paper Dolls"), but at last minute he cancels everything to go on tour with his beloved Lorena. The group decides to forge ahead without Eduardo, and thus six young people get to live their dreams of achieving fame and fortune. The series addresses many problems facing today's youth in the anecdotes about the lives of the members of the band.

== Cast ==
- Sasha Sokol as Jessica Lascurain Conti
- Ricky Martin as Pablo Loredo Muriel
- Angélica Rivera as Silvana Vélez
- Erik Rubín as Miguel Ángel Castellar
- Bibi Gaytán as María del Mar "Marimar" Pérez
- Pedro Fernández as Jorge Puente
- José Alonso as Leonardo Lascurain
- Silvia Pasquel as Paulina Muriel de Loredo
- Otto Sirgo as Alejandro Loredo
- Eduardo Palomo as Gabriel Loredo Muriel
- Luis Gimeno as Don Odiseo Conti
- Anel as Verónica Vélez
- Angélica Ruvalcaba as Aurora Rueda
- Oscar Traven as Roque Escamilla
- Marcos Valdés as Amadeus Silva
- Andrea Legarreta as Adriana Matresta del Castillo Lugo
- Héctor Suárez Gomiz as Pedro Lugo
- Daniel Martín as Joaquín de la Fuente
- Alejandro Ibarra as René/Felipe Rueda (flashback scenes)
- Lorena Rojas as Sara del Río
- Gabriela Goldsmith as Cristina Carrillo
- Dacia González as María de la Luz "Lucha" Rueda
- Luis Bayardo as Gustavo Rueda
- Carlos Monden as Servando
- Ernesto Yáñez as Martín Negrete "El Colorado"
- Mayra Rojas as Liliana Rojas
- Octávio Galindo as Octavio de la Parra
- Luis Couturier as Gonzalo Castellar
- Rosángela Balbó as Mariana Castellar
- María Prado as Clara de Puente
- Pedro Weber "Chatanuga" as Ricardo Puente
- Nancy Tamez as Trixi
- Amara Villafuerte as Laura Vélez
- Florencia Ferret as Claudia Loredo Muriel
- Lina Santos as Lina
- Paola Santoni as Beti
- David Ostrosky as Roberto Uribe
- Yuyú as Flora de Pérez
- Polo Ortín as Anselmo Pérez
- Marisa De Lille as Delfina
- Sergio Sendel as Ricardo "Rico" Puente Jr.
- Mary Paz Banquells as Ivonne
- Benjamín Islas as Genaro
- Germán Novoa as Carlos Rueda
- Fernando Arau as Bernardo "Barrabas"
- Ada Croner
- Alejandra Israel
- Sergio Jurado
- Alexandra Loretto
- Ricardo Mondragón
- Beatriz Monroy
- René Quiroz
- Tito Resendiz
- Wanda Seux as Lucrecia Magaña/Layla Soraya
- Óscar Vallejo as Gaspar "Gasparin" Silva
- Marisol Santacruz as Shubanely Silva
- José Luis Salazar as Pedro Lugo del Castillo
- Eduardo Capetillo as Eduardo Casablanca
- Mariana Garza as Lorena Gaitán Roca/Melissa

== Muñecos de Papel ==
Muñecos de Papel (Paper Toys) was a Mexican pop group that appeared on the telenovela. Its members were Sasha Sokol, at the time a former member from real life pop group Timbiriche, that also "shared" members Bibi Gaytán and Erik Rubin. The group was also formed by Ricky Martin (post-Menudo), soloist singer Pedro Fernández, soprano singer Marisa de Lille and the actress Angélica Rivera, the latter whom later became the First Lady of Mexico.

The group transitioned outside the show, touring in Mexico and recording 2 albums for 2 different music labels. The first one for Sony Music, titled Muñecos de Papel, included: Siento performed by Sasha Sokol, Juego de Ajedrez performed by Ricky Martin, Para Llegar performed by Angélica Rivera, Oro performed by Pedro Fernández, and the famous track performed by the group, Muñecos de Papel, among others. The second album was recorded for Melody Music, titled Alcanzar Una Estrella II, included: Tan Solo Una Mujer performed by Bibi Gaytán, Hacia El Viento performed by Erik Rubin, Rebeldía performed by Marisa de Lille and the famous track performed by the group, No Quiero Dejar De Brillar, among others.

They had a national tour visiting many cities in Mexico. The Creative Producer and director of the Concept was Luis de Llano Macedo, former creative producer and director of such vocal groups as: Timbiriche, Kabah (band) and Micro Chips. This group, and the 1991 telenovela they starred in, could be the prototype of the now famous 2004 telenovela, Rebelde and the RBD phenomenon.

Some of the actors were cast in the 1992 Mexican movie Más que alcanzar una estrella, inspired on the telenovelas.

== Soundtracks ==
=== Muñecos de Papel album ===
Muñecos de Papel (Album)

Soundtrack album by Alcanzar una estrella
- Released: 1991
- Recorded: 1991
- Genre: Pop
- Label: Sony Music

Alcanzar una estrella chronology
Alcanzar una estrella (1990)	Muñecos de Papel (Album) (1991)	Alcanzar una estrella II (1991)

Muñecos de Papel is the first soundtrack album to Alcanzar una estrella II, released in 1991. It includes the first opening song for the telenovela, "Estrella de Ilusion", performed by Zarabanda, as well as the second opening song "Muñeco de Papel", performed by the fictional band Muñecos de Papel (Sasha, Ricky Martin, Bibi Gaytan, Marisa de Lille, Pedro Fernández, Angelica Rivera and Erick Rubin).

The album version of "Muñeco de Papel" is different from the one that served as the opening song for the telenovela; Bibi Gaytán and Erick Rubín were then signed to Melody and due to differences between the record companies, their voices - which can be heard in the TV version (Sasha at 0:01, Bibi 0:13, Erick 0:40, Ricky 0:47, Pedro 0:54, Angelica 1:53)- were replaced by Sasha and Alejandro Ibarra, respectively.

Despite the title, this record was not a full Muñecos de Papel album; instead, it served to promote songs from the band members' solo albums ("Siento", "Juego de Ajedrez", "Oro") as well as other Sony Music artists such as Garibaldi that were not even featured in the telenovela. Songs such as Chantal Andere's "Musculo", which was often used in the TV show, are not present in this album - Chantal was also under contract with Melody.

==== Track listing ====
1. "Siento" - Sasha Sokol
2. "Estrella de Ilusion" - Zarabanda
3. "Fan-Piras" - Gerardo Garcia
4. "Muñeco de Papel" - Artistas Varios
5. "Deja" - Gibrann
6. "Para Llegar" - Angélica Rivera
7. "Oro" - Pedro Fernández
8. "Juego de Ajedrez" - Ricky Martin
9. "Enciendo Una Vela" - Marianne
10. "Banana" - Garibaldi (group)
11. "Harto de Extrañarte" - Alejandro Ibarra
12. "Amiga" - Ulisses

=== Alcanzar una estrella II ===
Alcanzar una estrella II

Studio album by Alcanzar una estrella
- Released: 1991
- Recorded: 1991
- Genre: Pop
- Label: Fonovisa

Alcanzar una estrella chronology
Muñecos de Papel (1991)	Alcanzar una estrella II (1991)	Mas que alcanzar una estrella (1992)

Alcanzar una estrella II is the second soundtrack album from Alcanzar una estrella II. It was released by Discos Melody in June 1991 as the telenovela was coming to an end.

The telenovela's fictional pop band Muñecos de Papel was formed by Sasha, Ricky Martin, Bibi Gaytan, Pedro Fernandez, Erick Rubin and Angelica Rivera.

This album includes the voices of Bibi Gaytan and Erick Rubin - both Bibi and Erick had been omitted from the Muñecos de Papel album, released months earlier by Sony. It is, however, unclear whether Sasha, Pedro Fernandez and Angelica Rivera contributed backing vocals to the only group song in Alcanzar una estrella II, "No quiero dejar de brillar" - Bibi Gaytan, Erick Rubin and Ricky Martin all have solo verses but the other members do not, and the credits do not include this information. The third opening song for the series, "No quiero dejar de brillar", is included in this album.

"No quiero dejar de brillar" did not achieve the success of the group's previous single "Muñeco de Papel". The song is not attributed to the fictional band Muñecos de Papel, but instead it's credited to "Estrellas de Alcanzar una Estrella" (Stars from Alcanzar una Estrella) - which might indicate that it was not recorded by all six members of the group. Further evidence is the fact that there are no Muñecos de Papel photos in the artwork, and the back cover only features Gaytan and Rubin (then under contract with Melody), as well as other cast members who were not part of Muñecos de Papel but did contribute songs: Angelica Ruvalcaba, Marisa De Lille and Hector Suarez Gomis. There are no images of Sasha, Martin, Fernandez or Rivera.

The album was not as successful as Muñecos de Papel; still, Bibi Gaytan had her first solo hit with the single "Tan solo una mujer". No further singles were released.

==== Track listing ====
1. "NO QUIERO DEJAR DE BRILLAR" – Estrellas de Alcanzar una Estrella
2. "TAN SOLO UNA MUJER" – Bibi Gaytán
3. "ASÍ QUIERO QUE SEA MI VIDA" – Marisa De Lile
4. "REBELDÍA" – Marisa De Lille
5. "HACIA EL VIENTO" Erick Rubin
6. "EXTRAÑO SER NIÑA" – Angélica Ruvalcaba
7. "CONTAMINACIÓN" Erick Rubin
8. "UN LUGAR DONDE VIVIR" – Hector Suarez Gomis
9. "SOLO QUIERO QUE ME VUELVAS A QUERER" Bibi Gaytán
10. "ENERGÍA ES AMOR" – Microchips
11. "EN UN METRO" Erick Rubin
12. "FÍJATE EN MI" Bibi Gaytán

== Awards ==
Year	Award	Category	Nominee	Result
1992	10th TVyNovelas Awards	Best Supporting Actor	Otto Sirgo	Won
