= Fobia on Ice =

Live album

Fobia

Live album by Fobia
- Released: 16 December 1997
- Genre: Rock en español
- Label: RCA International

Fobia chronology
Amor Chiquito (1995)	Fobia (1997)	Wow (2004)

Fobia on Ice is a live album released by the Mexican rock band Fobia in 1997. After Fobia's first live album, band members Leonardo de Lozanne, Paco Huidobro, Cha!, and Iñaki, Jay de la Cueva, would part ways without formally breaking up until recording together again in 2004.

== The band ==
- Paco Huidobro: Guitars, chorus
- Leonardo de Lozanne: Vocals, chorus
- Iñaki: Keyboards
- Cha!: Bass
- Jay de la Cueva: Drums

== Track listing ==
1. El microbito (The little microbe, from Fobia)
2. Veneno vil (Vile poison, from Amor Chiquito)
3. Fiebre (Fever, from Leche)
4. El diablo (The devil, from Mundo Feliz)
5. Camila (Camila, from Mundo Feliz)
6. Regrésame a Júpiter (Take me back to Jupiter, from Leche)
7. Descontrol (Descontrol, from Amor Chiquito)
8. Puedo rascarme solo (I can scratch myself, from Fobia)
9. Dios bendiga a los gusanos (God bless the worms, from Fobia)
10. Los cibernoides (The cibernoids, from Leche)
11. Mira Teté (Mientras más fumo más te quiero) (Look Teté (the more I smoke, the more I love you), from Amor Chiquito)
12. Perra policía (Bitch police, from Leche)
13. Revolución sin manos (Revolution without hands, from Amor Chiquito)
14. El crucifijo (The crucifix, from Fobia)
15. Hipnotízame (Hypnotize me, from Amor Chiquito)
16. Vivo (Alive, from Amor Chiquito)
