= Mucha mujer para ti =

Bibi Gaytan

Studio album by Bibi Gaytán
- Released: 1992
- Recorded: 1992
- Genre: Latin pop

Bibi Gaytán chronology
Bibi Gaytan (1992)	Manzana verde (1994)

Bibi Gaytan is the first album by Mexican pop singer Bibi Gaytán. This album is also (incorrectly) known as 'Mucha Mujer Para Ti', and it was released in 1992.

== Track listing ==
1. "Y Se Marcha Diciendo Perdón" (Marco Flores)
2. "No Me Importa" (Marco Flores)
3. "Ritmo Caliente" (Omar Flores, Gerardo Flores)
4. "Desearía" (Marco Flores)
5. "Como un tatuaje" (Gerardo Flores)
6. "Ya Nada Sera Igual" (Manuel Mene, C. Rodriguez)
7. "Brujo de amor" (Marco Flores)
8. "Muriendo lento" (Karen Guindi, Gerardo Flores, Marco Flores)
9. "Quiero Irme de Aquí" (Gerardo Flores)
10. "Más Allá de un Simple Beso" (Marco Flores)
11. "Mucha Mujer Para Ti" (Gerardo Lopez)
12. "Rock Café" Hard Rock Cafe(Carole King), Lopez Lee
13. "Contigo y Con el Viento" (Carole King), Lopez Lee)

== Singles ==
#	Title
1.	"No Me Importa"
2.	"Mucha Mujer Para Ti"
3.	"Y Se Marcha Diciendo Perdón"
4.	"Rock Café"
