= Rosa Venus =

Studio album by Fobia
- Released: 26 July 2005
- Genre: Rock en español
- Label: Sony International

Fobia chronology
| Wow (2004) | Rosa Venus (2005) | XX (2008) |

Rosa Venus is a Rock en español album recorded by Mexican rock band Fobia. The album was released on July 26, 2005. Songs include "Hoy tengo miedo", previously recorded for their album Wow 87*04, "No eres yo", and "200 Sabados". This is Fobia's first full-length studio album since Amor Chiquito of 1995.

== Track listing ==
1. "Rosa Venus (Venus Rose)
2. "No Eres Yo" (You are Not Me)
3. "200 sábados" (200 Saturdays)
4. "No soy un buen perdedor" (I Am Not a Good Loser)
5. "12 Pasos" (12 Steps)
6. "1 Camino y un Camión" (1 road and one truck)
7. "2 corazones" (2 hearts)
8. "Todas las estrellas" (All the Stars)
9. "Una vida sencilla" (An Easy Life)
10. "Muy Maniaco de mi Parte" (So Maniacal of Me)
11. "Sembrando Estrellas" (Sowing stars)
12. "Hoy Tengo Miedo" (bonus track) (Today I'm afraid)
