= Manzana verde (album) =

Manzana Verde

Studio album by Bibi Gaytán
- Released: 1994
- Recorded: 1994
- Genre: Latin pop

Bibi Gaytán chronology
Mucha Mujer Para Ti (1992)	Manzana Verde (1994)

Manzana Verde (Green Apple) is the second album by Mexican pop singer Bibi Gaytán. It was released in 1994.

Bibi Gaytán was filming the telenovela Dos mujeres, un camino alongside former CHiPs star, Erik Estrada, who played Johnny and Laura León. When production was finished Gaytán married Eduardo Capetillo.

== Track listing ==
1. "¿Qué Cambió?"
2. "Manzana Verde"
3. "Tócame de Amor"
4. "Ya No Hay Más"
5. "Dos Mujeres, un Camino" (Fernando Riba; Kiko Campos)
6. "Lago Azul"
7. "Vas a Llorar"
8. "Eco de Mi Vida"
9. "Igual Que Tú"
10. "Sueño de Mujer"

== Singles ==
#	Title
1.	"Dos Mujeres, un Camino"
2.	"Manzana Verde"
