= Titán (band) =

Mexican band

Titan
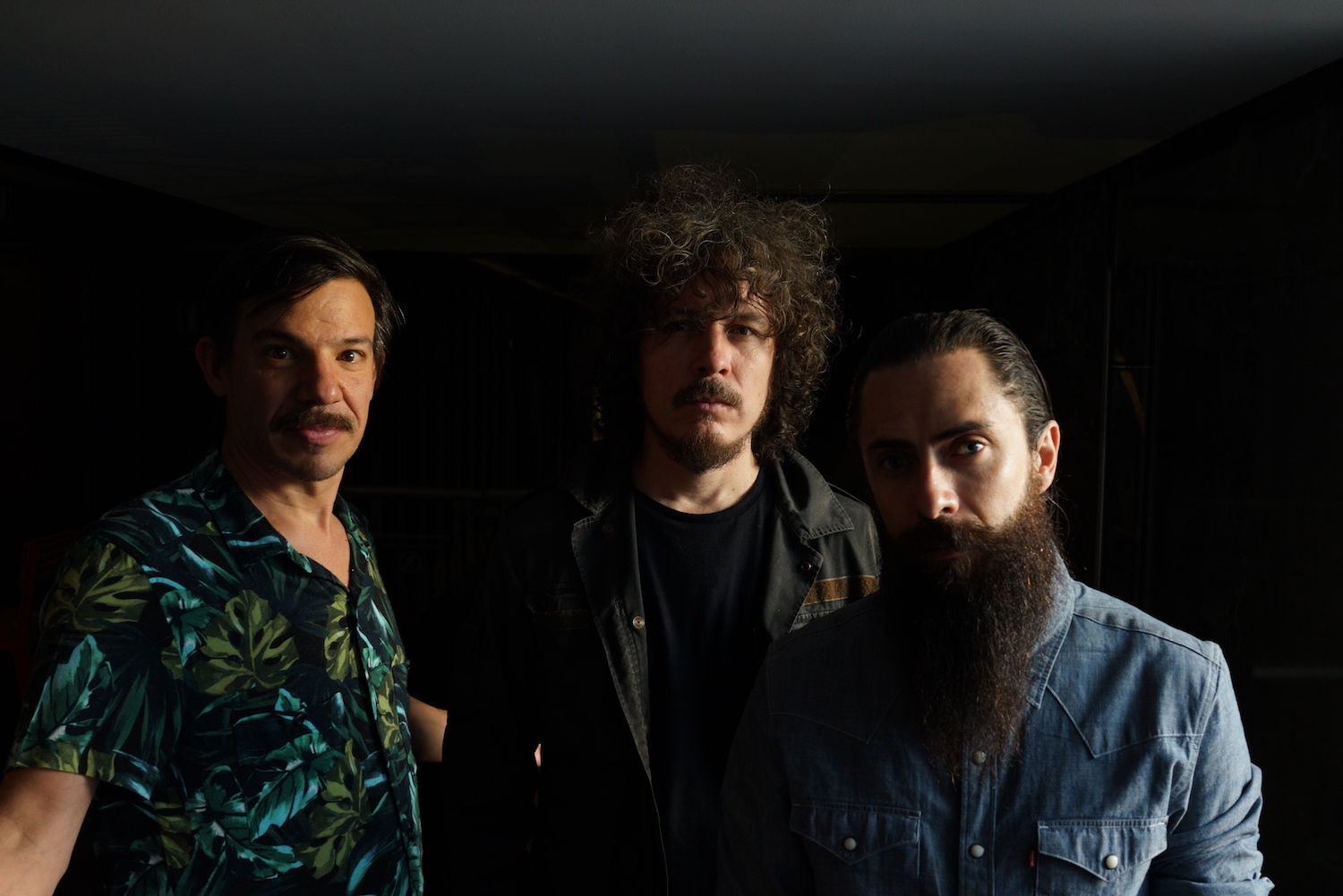
- Titán in 2016

Background information
- Origin: Mexico City, Mexico
- Genres: Lo-fi, rock, electro
- Years active: 1992-present
- Labels: Culebra, Tómbola Recordings, Nuevos Ricos, Épico
- Members: Jay de la Cueva
- Past members: Andrés Sánchez

Titán or TITAN is a Mexican electronic band formed in 1992 from the industrial band Melamina Ponderosa, where Emilio Acevedo and Julián Lede first met each other, later Jay de la Cueva (Molotov, Microchips, Fobia, Moderatto) joined the band. They have released four albums, the most recent, Dama in 2016.

== Career ==
The band was formed in 1992 after two members from the industrial band Melamina Ponderosa, Emilio Acevedo and Julián Lede split and recruited Andrés Sánchez. Later Jay de la Cueva (Molotov, Microchips, Fobia, Moderatto) joined the band.

In 1995, the trio made their debut with the Terrodisco EP. It was followed by the single "C'mon Feel the Noise". They moved to Virgin Records for the album Elevator that was produced by Michael Franti, Craig Borrell and Ross Harris. If featured the singles "1,2,3,4" and "Corazón", whose videos were directed by Evan Bernard.

In 2005, they released their self-titled album Titán through the new Mexican indie label Nuevos Ricos.

The band released their fourth album Dama on 28 August 2016 through ATP Recordings, which was produced by English producer Nick Launay. It features vocals by Gary Numan, Siobhan Fahey, Egyptian Lover, Church and El Columpio Asesino.

== Band members ==
Jay de la Cueva - Bass
Emilio Acevedo - Keyboard
Julián Lede - Guitar

Past members

Andrés Sánchez - Bass, fue remplazado en 1997 por Jay de la Cueva

== Discography ==
- 1995 - Terrodisco
- 1999 - Corazón EP
- 1999 - Elevator
- 2005 - Titán
- 2016 - Dama

== Terrodisco ==
=== Tracks ===
1. Cuin
2. Alto Impacto
3. La Chica de ULA ULA
4. Jaguar 83
5. CUIN (RADIO MIX)
6. ULA ULA (RADIO MIX)
7. SAFARI MIX
8. KARATE MIX
9. Bonus Track

== Elevator ==
=== Tracks ===
1. 1, 2, 3, 4
2. Corazón
3. Honey
4. Battle Love
5. The Future
6. King Kong
7. C'mon Feel the Noise
8. La Frecuencia del Amor
9. 1000 Ninjas
10. Vaquero
11. Sawrite
12. P.E.C.

The song "1,2,3,4" was included in the album for the Mexican movie "Todo el poder".

Then, the next album they released, self-titled included these songs:

== Titán ==
=== Tracks ===
1. Space Chemo
2. Pasion y Amor
3. Odisea 2001
4. Placa Acero
5. Chemix
6. Araña
7. Mi Chica
8. Back in Jail
9. Bonanza Edomex
10. Estampida

== Dama Fina ==
In 2016, Titan returns after almost ten years of absence. This new production was recorded in the studios of Sonic Ranch, Texas, United States. The sound of the album is characterized by its dark atmosphere and for having important collaborations such as the participation of Siobhan Fahey, El Columpio Asesino, Church, Egyptian Lover y uno de los precursores del synth-pop, la leyenda Gary Numan.

=== Tracks ===
1. Dama Fina
2. Hella.A. (Feat. Siobha Fahey)
3. Tchaikovsky
4. Sangre
5. Dama Negra (Feat. El Columpio Asesino)
6. Dark Rain (Feat. Gary Numan)
7. El Rey del Swing
8. Apache
9. Arahant (Feat. Church)
10. Soldado
11. She Likes De Music (Feat. Egyptian Lover)
12. Himno
