= Bibi Gaytán =

Mexican singer and actress (born 1972)

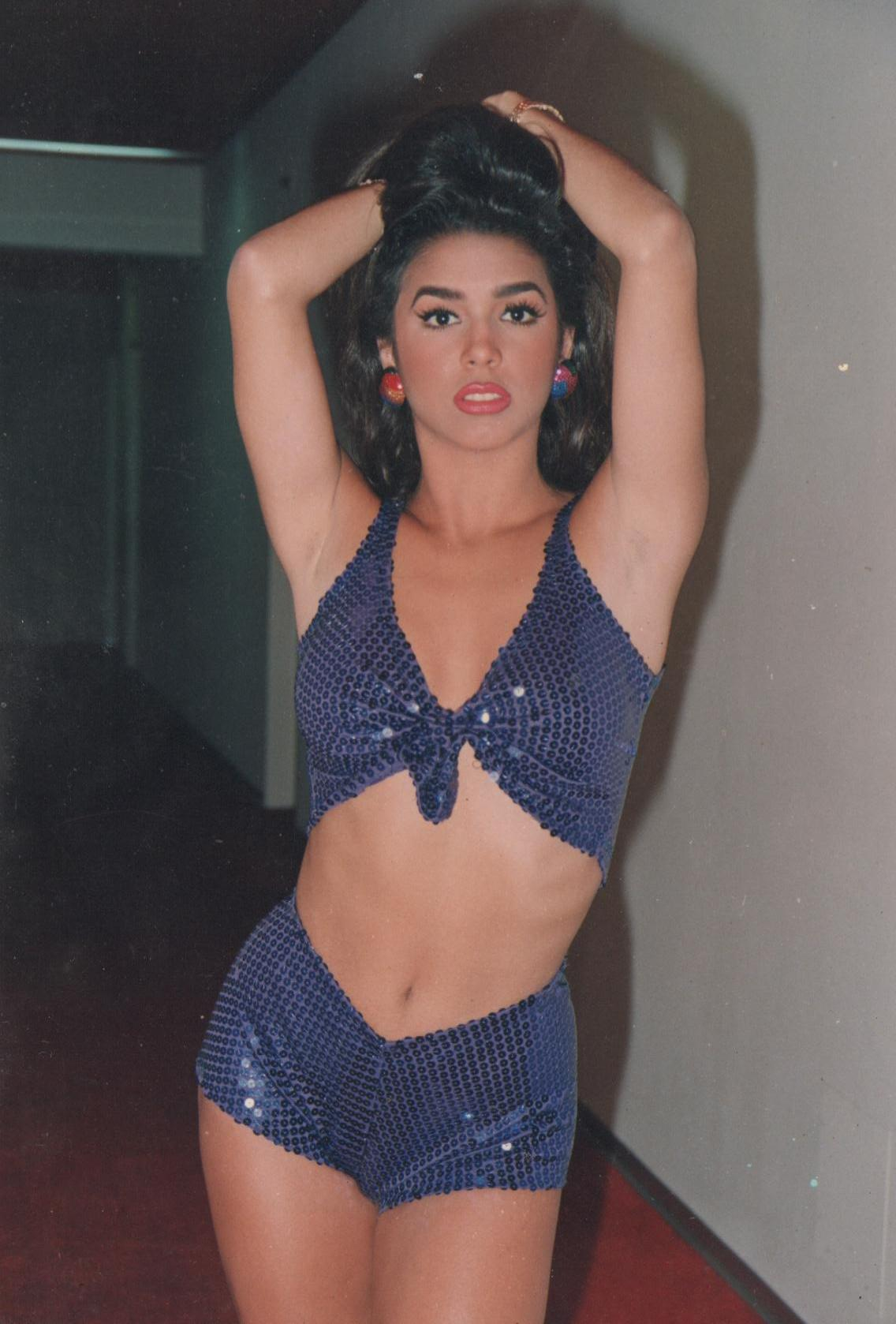

Background information
- Born: Silvia Gaytán Barragán; January 27, 1972 (age 54); Villahermosa, Tabasco, Mexico
- Occupations: Singer; actress
- Years active: 1989–present
- Formerly of: Timbiriche
- Spouse: Eduardo Capetillo (m. 1994)
- Children: 5
- Relatives: Chacho Gaytán (brother)

Silvia "Bibi" Gaytán Barragán (born January 27, 1972) is a Mexican singer and actress. Since she was born, she has lived in Villahermosa, Tabasco and she considers herself "Tabasqueña".

== Career ==
She is the only female among five brothers: musician Gonzalo "Chacho" Gaytán, retired actor Alejandro Gaytán, Timbiriche's Daniel "Mano" Gaytán and Rodrigo "Ruy' Gaytán. Bibi Gaytán started her career in 1989 when she joined the musical group Timbiriche, taking the place of original band member Alix Bauer. When she was in Timbiriche, she finished the tour for the "Timbiriche 8/9" album, and later recorded and toured for the "Timbiriche 10" album.

In 1991, she was cast in the Televisa telenovela, Alcanzar Una Estrella II, co-starring Sasha Sokol, Ricky Martin, Erik Rubin, Angélica Rivera, Pedro Fernández, among other known actors, as part of a fictional musical group called Muñecos de papel. Her solo song, Tan Sólo Una Mujer written by Ricardo Arjona, hit the charts and was a success in her singing career. She later left Timbiriche in May and her place was taken by Tanya Velasco.

1992 was an important year in Bibi's career. She starred in what became the box office hit of the year, the film Mas Que Alcanzar Una Estrella as part of the "Alcanzar una estrella" saga. That same year, she got one of the leads in the soap opera, Baila Conmigo, along with singer Paulina Rubio, and Eduardo Capetillo with whom she started a romantic relationship by the end of the telenovela. In September 1992, she released her first solo album, Bibi Gaytán. That album included the singles, Y Se Marcha Diciendo Perdon, No Me Importa, Mucha Mujer Para Ti, and Rock Cafe. She also released a 1993 calendar that was a hit.

After intense promotion of her debut album in Latin America, in mid-1993, she was cast for another telenovela. One of the most popular telenovelas in television history in Mexico, Dos Mujeres, Un Camino, alongside Erik Estrada and Laura Leon. It was the first telenovela that included "grupero artists" such as Grupo Bronco and the late Selena. The telenovela lasted one year.

In 1994, Bibi released her second studio album titled Manzana Verde. The promotion of this album did not even start because Bibi was pregnant. On 25 June 1994, Bibi and Eduardo Capetillo got married in the State of Morelos in Hacienda de Chiconcuac, an estate built in the 16th century by Martín Cortés, son of Hernán Cortés and La Malinche. The wedding was televised and was a historic event in Mexican Pop Culture.

On 17 August 1994, Eduardo Capetillo Gaytán was born and later, on 13 May 1997, Ana Paula Capetillo Gaytán was born.

In 1998, both Bibi and Capetillo starred in the telenovela, Camila alongside Adamari Lopez. It was the new version of 80s hit "Viviana". This is the last telenovela where Bibi has worked as a lead protagonist.

A third child was born on 4 November 1999, Alejandra Capetillo Gaytán.

In the 2000s, we saw Bibi do television ads, she even starred in 5 episodes of En Nombre del Amor, she was a guest judge in Bailando por un sueño. In late 2010 Eduardo and Bibi moved from Televisa to Television Azteca. Bibi did La Academia as a co-host and later Mexico Baila as a dance judge.

The Capetillo Gaytán family kept growing, and on 20 June 2014, twin brothers Manuel Capetillo Gaytán and Daniel Capetillo Gaytán were born.

Bibi is active on social media, with official Instagram and Twitter accounts.

== Discography ==
- 1992: Bibi Gaytan
- 1994: Manzana verde

== Appearances ==
- 1990: Timbiriche 10 ("Como Te Dire")
- 1991: Muñecos de Papel – appears on the cover, but her vocals were not recorded due to differences with the record label
- 1991: Alcanzar una estrella II – Various Artists ("Tan Solo Una Mujer", "Solo Quiero Que Me Vuelvas a Querer", "Fijate En Mi" – Bibi Gaytán, "No Quiero Dejar De Brillar" – Muñecos de Papel)
- 1992: Baila conmigo – Various Artists ("Olvidame", "El Primer Adios")
- 1992: Más que alcanzar una estrella – Various Artists ("Sha La La y Apertura" – Bibi Gaytán, Ricky Martin, Alex Ibarra, Lorena Rojas)
- 1999: Ellas Cantan a Cri Cri – Various Artists ("Di Por Que")
- 2007: Un Vaquero en la ciudad – Eduardo Capetillo ("Una de Vaqueros" – trio con Joan Sebastian y Bibi Gaytán, "Si no es ahora" – duo con Bibi Gaytán)

== Filmography ==
=== Film ===
Year	Title	Role	Notes
1992	Más que alcanzar una estrella	Lisa	Film debut

=== Television ===
Year	Title	Role	Notes
1991	Alcanzar una estrella II	María del Mar "Marimar" Pérez	Lead role
1992	Baila conmigo	Pilar Armendia	Lead role
1993–1994	Dos mujeres, un camino	Tania García	Lead role
1998–1999	Camila	Camila Flores	Lead role
2008	En nombre del amor	Sagrario Díaz de Espinoza de los Monteros	Guest Appearance

== Awards and nominations ==
=== Premios TVyNovelas ===
Year	Category	Telenovela	Result
1993	Best Young Lead Actress	Baila Conmigo	Nominated
