= The Madness of Love =

The Madness of Love may refer to:

- The Madness of Love (play); 1855 Spanish historical drama play
- The Madness of Love (film); 1922 American silent drama film
- Madness of Love
