= La Consentida =

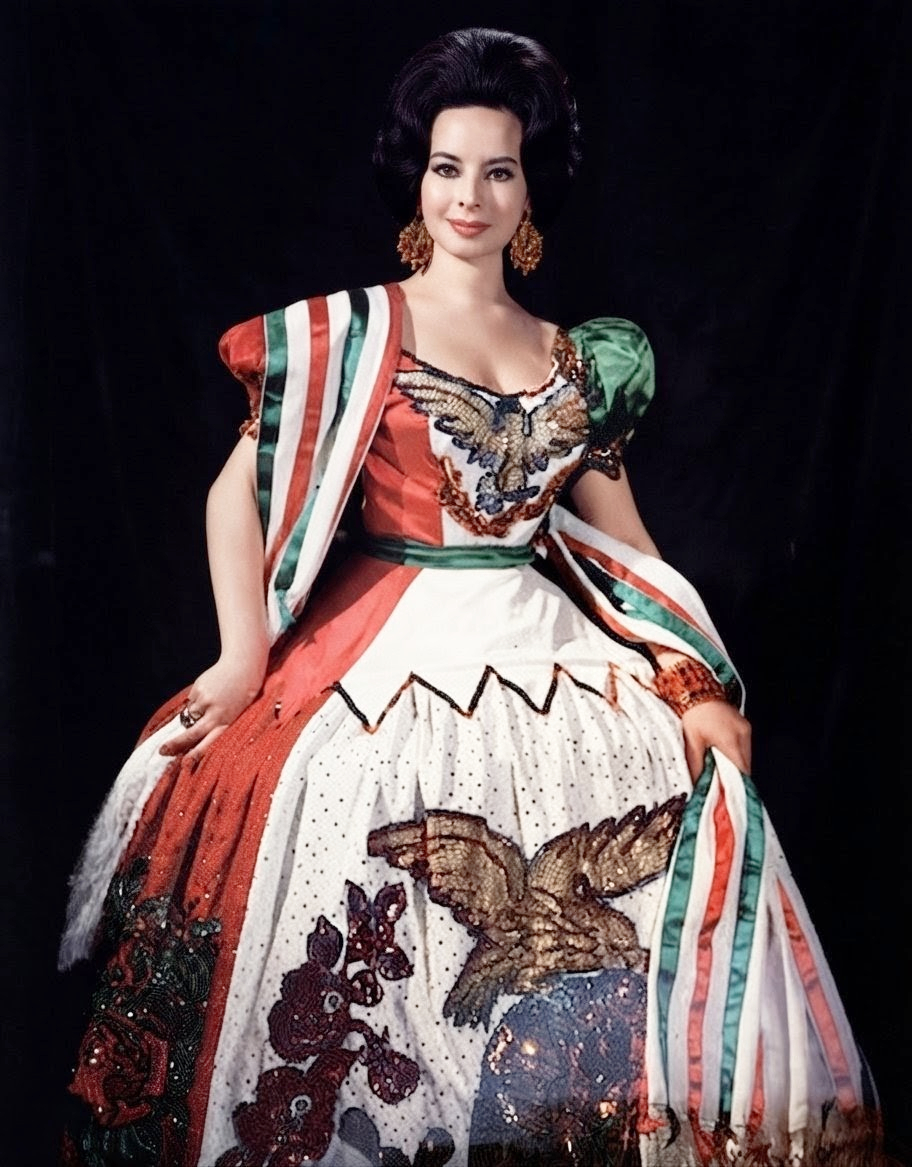
- La Consentida in the 1960s
- Born: María de los Ángeles Loya Sáenz; 1 October 1941 (age 84); Parral, Chihuahua, Mexico
- Occupations: Singer, actress
- Years active: 1953–1968
- Musical career
- Genre: Ranchera
- Instruments: Vocals
- Label: RCA Víctor

María de los Ángeles Loya Sáenz (born 1 October 1941), known by her stage name La Consentida, is a Mexican singer and actress, specialized in the musical genre of ranchera.

== Career ==
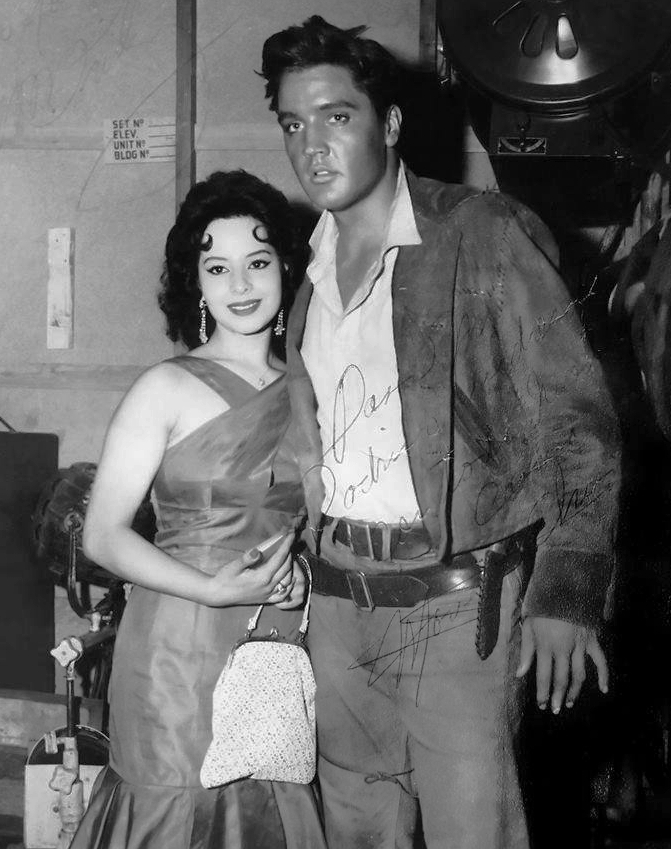
La Consentida with Elvis Presley in 1959. The two were in a relationship between that year and 1960

Born in Parral, Chihuahua, she began her career in 1953 when she recorded her first hit single, "Gorrioncillo pecho amarillo". She recorded exclusively for RCA Víctor, and her recordings featured accompaniment by the Mariachi Vargas de Tecalitlán.

She made her film debut as a musical guest in the film El hombre inquieto (1954), starring Germán Valdés "Tin-Tan", Martha Valdés, Joaquín Pardavé and Sara García. She acted in Lupe Balazos, starring Lucha Moreno and Julio Aldama.

== Discography ==
=== Studio albums ===
- La Consentida, vol. 1
- La Consentida, vol. 2
