= Baila conmigo (TV series) =

- Genre: Telenovela
- Created by: Susan Crowley; Gabriela Ortigoza
- Directed by: Marco Flavio Cruz
- Starring: Eduardo Capetillo; Bibi Gaytán; Paulina Rubio; Rafael Rojas; Claudia Islas
- Theme music composer: Luis Guzmán; Ignacio Pérez; David Rojo
- Opening theme: "Baila conmigo el Rock and Roll" by Eduardo Capetillo, Bibi Gaytán, Paulina Rubio, Stephanie Salas and Gerardo Gallardo
- Country of origin: Mexico
- Original language: Spanish
- No. of episodes: 100

Production
- Executive producer: Luis de Llano M
- Cinematography: Manuel Ruiz Esparza

Original release
- Network: Canal de las Estrellas
- Release: March 30 – August 14, 1992

Baila conmigo, is a youth telenovela produced by Luis de Llano M for Televisa in 1992.

Eduardo Capetillo and Bibi Gaytán star as the main protagonists, while Paulina Rubio, Rafael Rojas and Claudia Islas star as the main antagonists.

== Plot ==
The story is set at the end of the 1950s in the era of the birth of rock and roll. The beautiful and popular Pilar falls for the ambitious Bruno, who only seeks adventure and fame. Andrea, Pilar's closest friend is also interested in him and decides to pursue a romance with him despite not being as attractive as Pilar. Also pursuing Pilar is handsome and kind-hearted singer, Eddy Lopez.

== Cast ==
- Bibi Gaytán as Pilar Armendia
- Eduardo Capetillo as Eddy López
- Paulina Rubio as Andrea de la Reguera
- Rafael Rojas as Bruno Ventura
- Alexis Ayala as Tomás de la Reguera
- Joaquín Cordero as Germán de la Reguera
- Claudia Islas as Nelly Moll
- Maria Victoria as Refugio
- Lucha Moreno as Johanna
- Stephanie Salas as Clarita / Clarissa
- Angelina Peláez as Rebeca
- Andrea Legarreta as Rebeca
- Mónica Prado as Cristina
- Rodrigo Vidal as Samuel
- Emilia Carranza as Julia
- Lorena Rojas as Rosario
- Sergio Jiménez as El Tuerto
- Anna Silvetti as Magdalena
- Rosario Zúñiga as Carolina
- Alicia Montoya as Marcela
- Magda Karina as Catalina
- José Juan as Plácido
- Abraham Stavans as Jacobo
- Mimí as Rosita
- Dacia González as Teresa
- Martha Ofelia Galindo as Lupe
- Martha Resnikoff as Sara
- Amparo Arozamena as Consuelo
- Margarita Isabel as Catalina
- Mayra Rojas as Lety
- Giorgio Palacios as Sebastián Martínez
- Héctor Gómez as Fidel Guzmán
- Arturo Adonay as Sebastián "El Jairo"
- Alejandro Treviño as Esteban "El Popotes"
- Angélica Ruvalcaba as Mary Jean (#1)
- María Rebeca as Mary Jean (#2)
- Gerardo Gallardo as Ricardo
- Oscar Traven as Adolfo
- Leonardo Daniel as Óscar del Prado

== Music ==
Baila conmigo

Soundtrack album by Various Artists
- Released: 1992
- Recorded: 1992
- Genre: Pop
- Label: Fonovisa

Various Artists chronology
Mas que alcanzar una estrella (1992)	Baila conmigo (1992)

The soundtrack was released in 1992. It features various artists such as Eduardo Capetillo, Bibi Gaytán, Paulina Rubio and Stephanie Salas.

=== Track listing ===
1. "BAILA CONMIGO EL ROCK AND ROLL" Eduardo Capetillo, Bibi Gaytán, Paulina Rubio, Stephanie Salas, El Gato, Gerardo Gallardo
2. "BAILA CONMIGO (DE CACHETITO)" Andrea Legarreta, Rodrigo Vidal
3. "OLVÍDAME" Bibi Gaytán
4. "MARY JEAN" Gerardo Gallardo
5. "TONTERÍAS (Sweet Nothings)" Stephanie Salas
6. "QUE TRISTE ES EL PRIMER ADIÓS (Breaking up is hard to do)" Bibi Gaytán
7. "TE QUIERO AMAR" El Gato (Rafael Rojas)
8. "BAILA CONMIGO"
9. "ALGUIEN NOS QUIERE JUNTOS" Angélica Ruvalcaba
10. "SI ES AMOR"
11. "SUEÑA Y BAILA CONMIGO" Paulina Rubio
12. "COMO LA VAMOS A PASAR" Rafael Rojas
