= Chacho Gaytán =

Mexican musician

Gonzalo "Chacho" Gaytán is a Mexican music composer, producer, musical arranger, musical director and conductor. He is best known for being the co-founder and keyboardist of the Mexican pop band Sentidos Opuestos, along with colleague Alessandra Rosaldo. He is also the brother of actress and singer Bibi Gaytan and brother-in-law of actor and singer Eduardo Capetillo.

== Career ==
As a musical producer, he was nominated for a Latin Grammy Award in 2000 for Best Latin Children's Album for Ellas Cantan a Cri-Cri. As musical director, he is best known for his musical direction in West Side Story and for his musical arrangement, orchestration and conducting of orchestras in Mexico, having presented his work at The Palace of Fine Arts in Mexico City with the National Philharmonic Orchestra. He has worked with Fernando de la Mora, in concert with the Campeche Philharmonic Orchestra.

Gaytán is the founder of Mexican jazz band, Manzana Jazz Band. He is currently director of Azteca Music, a TV network in Mexico. He is also a co-founder and the musical producer and director of MYST.

== Discography ==
- Un día después (2007)
