= Valdés family =

Mexican family

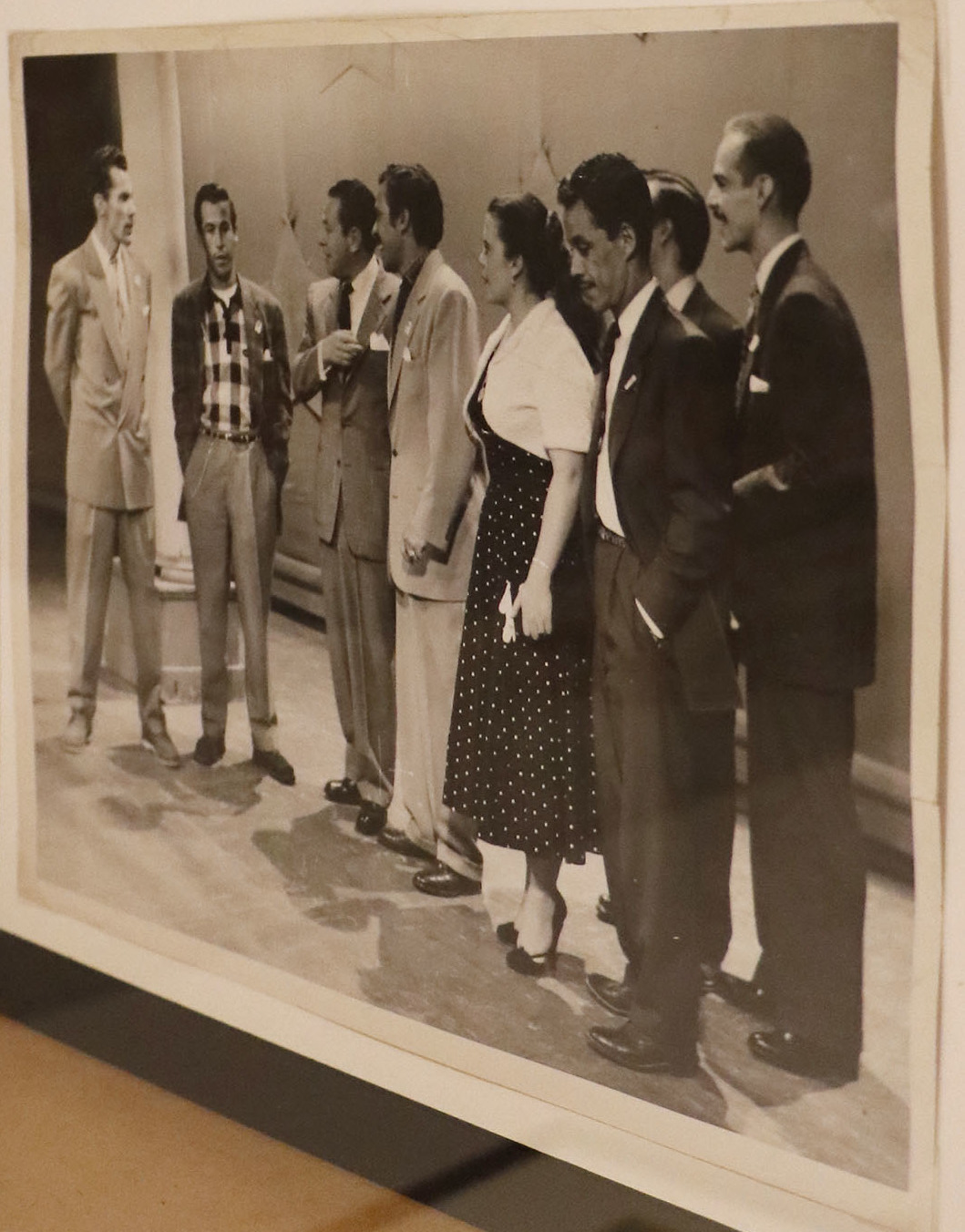
The Valdés brothers; Ramón (gray suit, first on the left), Antonio (plaid shirt), Germán (gray suit, center) and Manuel (black suit, last in the second row from the right) in 1958

The Valdés family is Spanish descent consisting of a number of famous comedians and singers.

Some notable members are:

- Germán Valdés, a comedian (a.k.a. "Tin Tán").
  - Rosalía Valdés, an actress and singer daughter of Germán.
- Manuel Valdés, a comedian brother of Germán (a.k.a. "el loco Valdés").
  - Cristian Castro, a famous singer son of Manuel and Verónica Castro (He has never used the name Valdés).
  - Marcos Valdés, an actor and singer son of Manuel.
- Antonio Valdés, a comedian brother of Germán, Ramón and Manuel (a.k.a. "el ratón Valdés").
- Ramón Valdés, a comedian brother of Germán, Antonio and Manuel (a.k.a. "Moncho" or "Monchito").
