= Manuel Valdés =

Mexican actor and comedian (1931–2020)

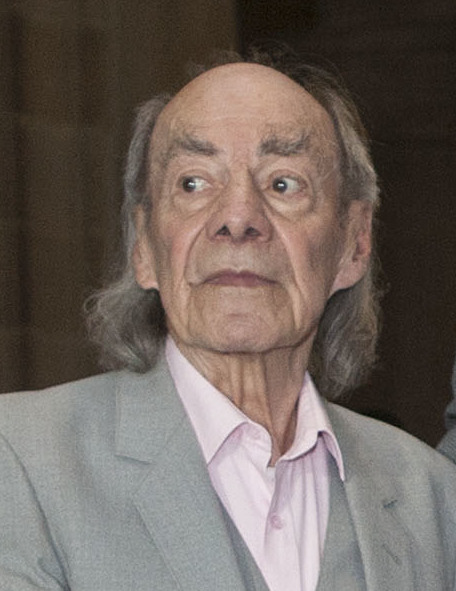
- Manuel Valdes in 2015
- Born: Fernando Manuel Alfonso Gómez de Valdés y Castillo; 29 January 1931; Ciudad Juárez, Chihuahua, Mexico
- Died: 28 August 2020 (aged 89); Mexico City, Mexico
- Other name: El Loco Valdés
- Notable work: La Carabina de Ambrosio
- Children: 12, including Cristian Castro and Marcos Valdés
- Family: Valdés family

Fernando Manuel Alfonso Gómez de Valdés y Castillo (29 January 1931 – 28 August 2020), known as El Loco Valdés, was a Mexican actor and comedian. A member of the Valdés family, he was the brother of Germán Valdés "Tin-Tan", a prolific comic film actor, and of Ramón Valdés, who portrayed Don Ramón on the sitcom El Chavo del Ocho. He was also the father of singers Cristian Castro and Marcos Valdés.

== Personal life ==
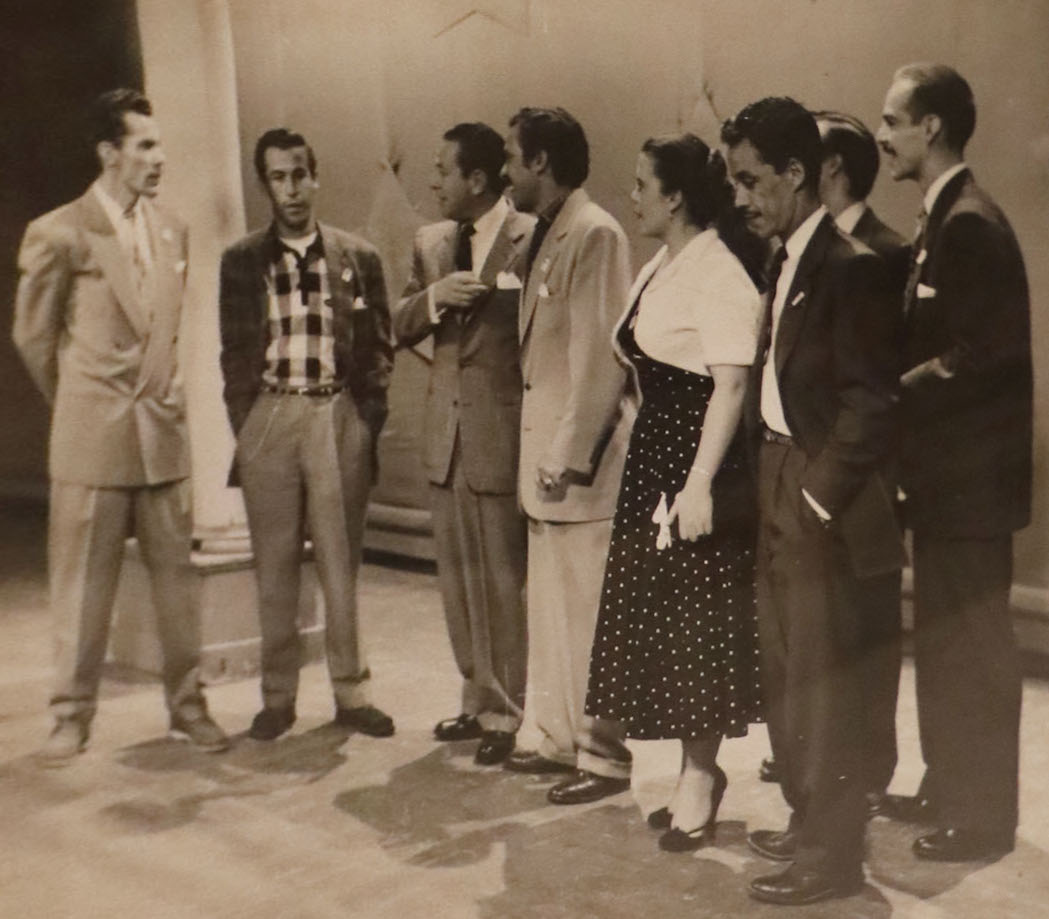
The Valdés brothers; Ramón (gray suit, first on the left), Antonio (plaid shirt), Germán (gray suit, center) and Manuel (black suit, last in the second row from the right) in 1958

Manuel Valdés was born on 29 January 1931 in Ciudad Juárez, in the Mexican state of Chihuahua. His parents were Rafael Gómez-Valdés Angellini and Guadalupe Castillo. Valdés had eight siblings: Rafael, Guadalupe, Pedro, Armando, Cristóbal, Ramón Valdés "Don Ramón", Germán Valdés "Tin-Tan" and Antonio "El Ratón" Valdés.

Near the end of his life he clarified that his last name was actually double-barrelled (being Gómez-Valdés) but that he and his family decided to take off the Gómez part in order to not confuse the audience into thinking Valdés was their mother's maiden name (per Spanish naming customs.)

The Valdés-Castillo family moved to Nuevo Laredo when Manuel was seven years old because the elder Valdés worked for the Mexican customs agency and had to move frequently. Germán Valdés was already successful as Tin-Tan. He wanted to buy the family a house, but his father turned him down and they moved to Mexico City.

At the age of 13, Manuel had his first film experience, working as an extra in El hijo desobediente and receiving a payment of 12 pesos. He took up dancing and at the age of 19 and became a dancer with Televicentro. His first experience as a comedian was on Variedades de medio día alongside Héctor Lechuga. "El Loco" Valdés is considered the first true television comedian.

Valdés had twelve children, including Norma, Arcelia, Manuel, Jorge, Fernando, Alejandro, Norma, Oscar, Marcos, and Cristian. Cristian is the son of actress Verónica Castro.

== Filmography ==
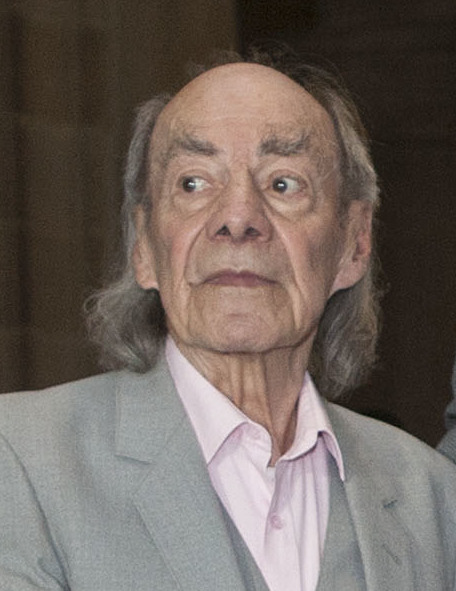
Manuel Valdés in 2015

=== Films ===
- Music, Poetry and Madness (1948)
- Tender Pumpkins (1949)
- The Mark of the Skunk (1950)
- Oh Darling! Look What You've Done! (1951)
- They Say I'm a Communist (1951)
- You've Got Me By the Wing (1953)
- Madness of Love (1953)
- It Is Never Too Late to Love (1953)
- The Unknown Mariachi (1953)
- The Viscount of Monte Cristo (1954)
- The Cha Cha Cha Widows (1955)
- Look What Happened to Samson (1955)
- Trip to the Moon (1958)
- Música de siempre (1958)
- A Thousand and One Nights (1958)
- Dangers of Youth (1960)
- The Phantom of the Operetta (1960)
- Tom Thumb and Little Red Riding Hood (1962)
- The Loving Ones (1979)
- Midnight Dolls (1979)
- La leyenda de la Nahuala (2007)

=== Television ===
- La Carabina de Ambrosio (1978–1984)
- ¡Vivan los niños! (2002)
- Siempre te amaré (2000)
- Entre el amor y el odio (2002)
- Amy, la niña de la mochila azul (2004)
- Como dice el dicho (2012)

== Death ==
Valdés died on 28 August 2020 from complications of brain cancer. He was wearing a jersey of Club América when he was cremated the following day.
