= Antonio Valdés =

Mexican actor (1930–2021)

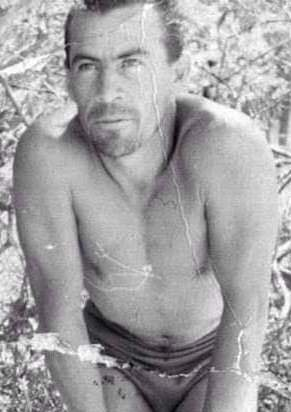
- Born: Antonio José Luis Gómez Valdés y Castillo; January 4, 1930; Mexico City, Mexico
- Died: January 6, 2021 (91 years); Mexico City, Mexico
- Other name: Ratón Valdés
- Years active: 1952-2021
- Family: Valdés family

Antonio José Luis Gómez Valdés y Castillo (January 4, 1930 – January 6, 2021), known as El Ratón Valdés, was a Mexican actor and comedian, brother of the also comedian actors, Ramón Valdés "Don Ramón", Germán Valdés "Tin-Tan", Manuel "El Loco" Valdés. He was participated in the programs La Cosa and Puro Loco, tracing the origin of his career during the Golden Age of Mexican cinema, where he participated in several films with his brothers.

== Filmography ==
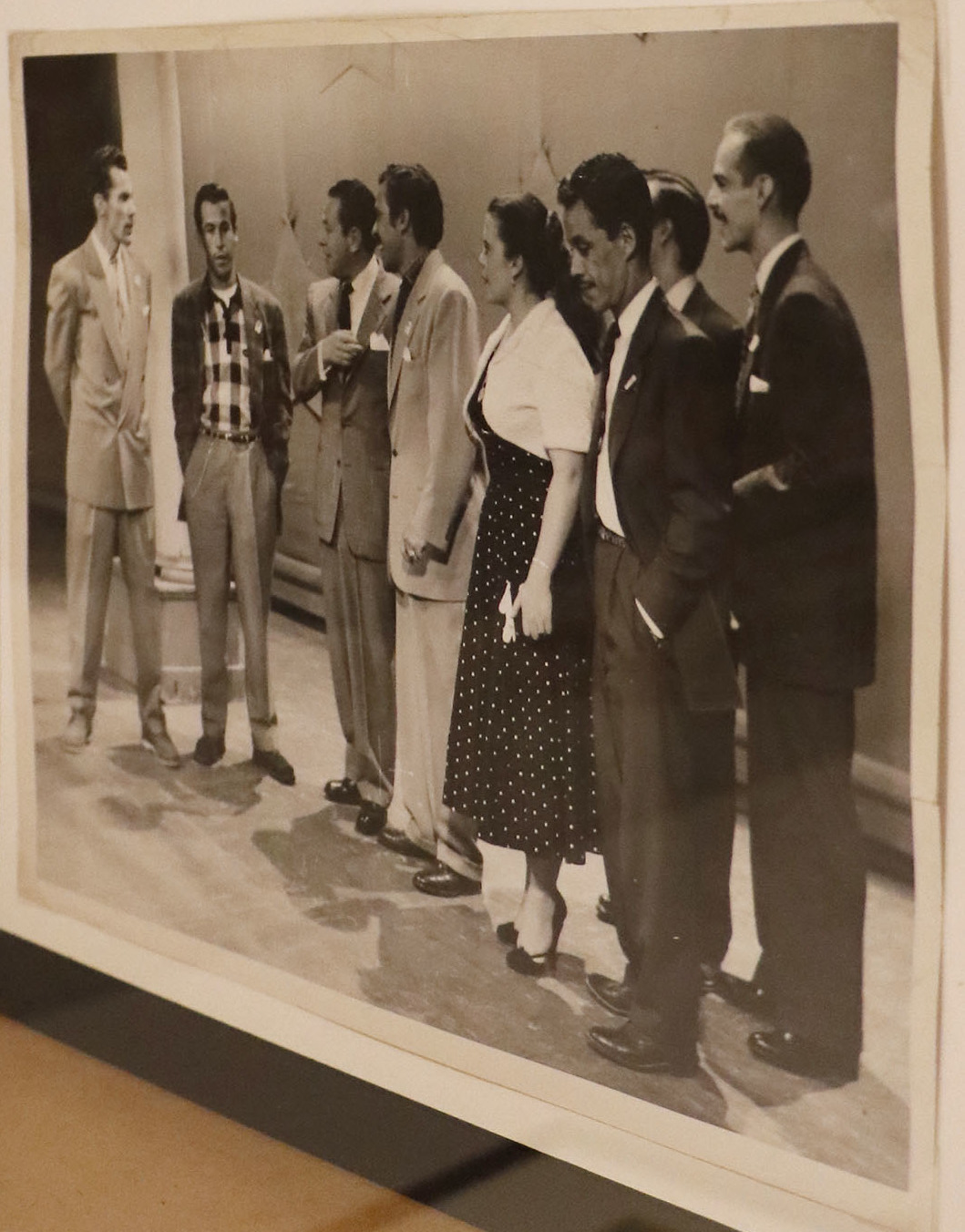
The Valdés brothers; Ramón (gray suit, first on the left), Antonio (plaid shirt), Germán (gray suit, center) and Manuel (black suit, last in the second row from the right) in 1958

=== Series ===
- Club de Cuervos (2019) - Season 4, Episode 9.
- A la mexicana...(1997)
- Puro loco...(1995 to 2002) several

=== Films ===
- El alegre divorciado...(1976)
- Bikinis y rock...(1972)
- ¡Ahí madre!...(1970)
- Gregorio y su ángel...(1970)
- El aviso inoportuno...(1969)
- Operación Ja Ja...(1966) (TV series)
- Tintansón Crusoe...(1965)
- Las mil y una noches...(1958) (as José A. Valdés)
- Refifí entre las mujeres...(1958)
- Variedades de mediodía...(1955)
- Maldita ciudad...(1954)
- Los chamacones... (as Antonio Valdez)
- Me traes de un' ala...(1953) (uncredited)
- Apasionada...(1952)

=== Documentaries ===
- Ni Muy, Muy... ni Tan, Tan... simplemente Tin Tan ...(2005)
- Tin Tan, un documental de Francesco Taboada Tabone ...(2010)

== Death ==
Antonio died on Wednesday, January 6, 2021, at the age of 91, from a heart attack that occurred while he was sleeping. His death marked the end of the Valdes dynasty
