= Ladrón de corazones =

- Genre: Telenovela
- Based on: Poliladron by Adrián Suar
- Written by: Guillermo Ríos; Ricardo García; Leonardo Bechini; Epigmenio Ibarra; Mauricio Somjano; Roberto Stopello; Óscar Tabernise; Luis Zelkowicz
- Directed by: Walter Doehner; Silvana Zuanetti
- Starring: Manolo Cardona; Lorena Rojas; Humberto Zurita
- Opening theme: "Ladrón de corazones" by Elefantes
- Country of origin: United States
- Original language: Spanish
- No. of episodes: 141

Production
- Executive producers: Carlos Bardasano; Sachiko Uzeta
- Producers: Carlos Payán; Epigmenio Ibarra; Mónica Skorlich; Ana Urquidi
- Cinematography: Esteban de Llaca
- Editor: Horacio Valle
- Camera setup: Multi-camera
- Production companies: Argos Comunicación; Telemundo Studios

Original release
- Network: Telemundo
- Release: May 19 – December 10, 2003

Related
- La venganza; El alma herida

Ladrón de Corazones, It is an American telenovela produced by Telemundo and Argos Comunicación in 2003. It was a remake of the hit 1995 Argentine series Poliladron created and starring Adrian Suar.

== Cast ==
- Lorena Rojas as Verónica Vega
- Manolo Cardona as Gustavo Velasco
- Humberto Zurita as Antonio Vega
- Roberto Mateos as Esteban de Llaca
- Fabiola Campomanes as Inés Santoscoy
- Claudia Lobo as Celia Tapia de Velasco
- Marcos Valdés as Ramiro Barrientos
- Raúl Arrieta as Froylan Narváez
- Roberto Medina as Padre Anselmo Tapia
- Marco Treviño as Mateo
- Sergio Ochoa as Tarta
- Lisa Owen as Magdalena Tapia
- Wendy de los Cobos as María Castillo
- Teresa Selma as Doña Francisca Zambrano de Velasco
- Paola Ochoa as Refugio
- Enoc Leaño as Ibañez
- Aarón Beas as Gabriel
- Carlos Coss as El Chino
- Alberto Guerra as Tony Castillo
- Marisol Centeno as Claudia Barrientos
- Teresa Tuccio as Susan Estévez
- Daniela Bolaños as Nancy Barrera
- Marisol del Olmo as Marcela
- Álvaro Guerrero as José Salvador Martínez 'Chepe'
- Marcelo Buquet as Patricio Benítez
- Luis Gerardo Méndez as Raúl
- Patricia Marrerro as Teresa
- Angélica Celaya as Renata
- Gabriel Porras as Román
- Alfredo Ahnert as Charles
- Rubén Cristiany as Obispo
- Rodolfo Arias as Carlos
- Luis Cárdenas as Secretario Manuel
- Alfonso Diluca as Leonardo de la Lama
- Emilio Guerrero as Leyva
- Eugenio Montessoro as Hernán Ferreira
- Irineo Alvarez as Secretario
- Roberto Montiel as Presidente
- Guillermo Ríos as Manuel Martínez
- Marco Antonio Aguirre as Chetas
- Candela Ferro as Elena Aragón
- Seraly Morales as Doctor
- Raúl Ortiz as Doctor
- Erwin Veytia as Virgilio
- Hugo Albores as Islas
- Adrian Alonso as Niño
- Fernando Banda as Fernando
- Moisés Cardez as Sicario
- José Antonio Coro as Doctor
- Ignacio Flores de la Lama as Jugador
- Marcela Espeso as Vendedora
- Jaime Estrada as Gerente de Boxeo
- John Gertz as Bill Carson
- Aurora Gil as Acompañante
- Antonio Gozat as El Chato
- Héctor Holten as. El director de la cárcel
- César Izaguirre as Testigo protegido
- Paco Mauri as Juez
- David Rencoret as Francisco Santoscoy
- Patricia Rozitchner as Silvia
- Juan Ríos Cantú as Emilio Escobar
- Alejandro Usigli as Narco
- Jorge Victoria as Espinoza
- Keyla Wood as Anna
- Luis Yeverino as Secuestrador
- Antonio Zagaceta as Ugalde
- Marco Zetina as Narco
