= El hombre inquieto =

- Directed by: Rafael Baledón
- Written by: Fernando Galiana
- Produced by: Rafael Valdés, Jacobo Derechin, Paul Castelain, Armando Solís
- Starring: Germán Valdés, Martha Valdés, Sara García, Joaquín Pardavé, Joaquín García
- Edited by: Rafael Ceballos
- Music by: Manuel Esperón y Enrique Rodríguez
- Distributed by: Filmex
- Release date: 1954
- Running time: 89 minutes
- Country: Mexico
- Language: Spanish

El hombre inquieto (English: "The Restless Man") is a 1954 Mexican film directed by Rafael Baledón and starring Germán Valdés "Tin-Tan", Martha Valdés, Sara García, Joaquín Pardavé and Joaquín García "Borolas". This film marked the film debut of the actress and singer María de los Ángeles Loya "La Consentida", and also features the musical participation of Trío Los Panchos.

== Plot ==
A poor newspaper-selling man, Germán, is hired by a greedy man, Roque, to impersonate the long dead son of a wealthy Arab, Cain Rafful. While doing so, Germán falls in love with Cain Rafful's only daughter, Elena, who is the girlfriend of Roque. When Mr. Rafful discovers the scam, he still accepts Germán as his adopted son and allows him to marry his daughter.
