= Sentidos Opuestos =

Mexican musicians

- Origin: Mexico
- Genre: Latin pop
- Years active: 1993–2001; 2012–present
- Labels: Warner Music, EMI
- Members: Alessandra Rosaldo; Chacho Gaytán
- Website: sentidosopuestos.com.mx

Sentidos Opuestos is a Mexican Latin pop music duo, formed by singer Alessandra Rosaldo and keyboardist Chacho Gaytán. Its career started in the early 1990s under the instructions of local producer Miguel Blasco.

Rosaldo had been a support singer for some pop acts in México, before starting what would be her first lead singing act. The group released a self-titled debut album in 1993, with their songs "Historias de Amor" and "Escribeme en el Cielo" appearing on local charts.

A year later, Sentidos Opuestos recorded Al Sol Que Mas Calienta. They then moved to Barcelona, Spain, to record their third album Viviendo del Futuro, produced by Eduardo Posada and released in 1997.

Following their fourth studio album Viento a Favor in 1998, Chacho Gaytán began working as a producer and arranger while Rosaldo was making her debut as an actress in a soap opera called DKDA: Sueños de Juventud. In the year 2000, Sentidos Opuestos returned with Movimiento Perpetuo. They announced the separation of the group and released a live album called En Vivo in 2001.

In 2012, they started a reunion tour, and released a new album.

In 2024, they released a song under the name "Y Me Llegaste Tu".

== Musical style ==
Techno, Electronic POP, House, Dance

== Discography ==
- Sentidos Opuestos (1993)
- Al Sol Que Mas Calienta (1994)
- Viviendo del Futuro (1996)
- Viento a Favor (1998)
- Movimiento Perpetuo (2000)
- En Vivo (2001)
- Historias de Amor - Lo Mejor de Sentidos Opuestos (2003)
- Zona Preferente (2012)
- Únete a La Fiesta (2017)
