= A Tailored Gentleman =

1954 film by Miguel M. Delgado

- Directed by: Miguel M. Delgado
- Written by: Miguel M. Delgado; Jaime Salvador
- Story by: Jaime Salvador
- Produced by: Jacques Gelman
- Starring: Mario Moreno «Cantinflas» Martha Valdés; Ángel Garasa; Domingo Soler; Wolf Ruvinskis; Anabelle Gutiérrez
- Cinematography: Víctor Herrera
- Edited by: Jorge Bustos
- Music by: Raúl Lavista
- Production company: Posa Films
- Distributed by: Columbia Pictures
- Release date: 1 September 1954
- Running time: 100 minutes
- Country: Mexico
- Language: Spanish

A Tailored Gentleman (Spanish: Caballero a la medida) is a 1954 Mexican comedy film, directed by Miguel M. Delgado and starring Mario Moreno «Cantinflas», Martha Valdés, Domingo Soler, Wolf Ruvinskis, Anabelle Gutiérrez and Ángel Garasa. The film's art direction was by Gunther Gerszo.

== Plot ==
Cantinflas is a model of tuxedos for a tailor shop, wandering around in the streets wearing the tuxedos while also wearing an ad put on his back. In the meantime, he also works as a tailor for his neighbors, and collaborates with Lita (Martha Valdés) and Father Feliciano (Domingo Soler) in the neighborhood's dispensary, where Lita works as a nurse. At the same time, the life of Don Pascual Lachica (Ángel Garasa), an anguished millionaire whose family only respects him as a provider, is shown. One day after work, Cantinflas arrives to return the tuxedo, but the store was closed, so he takes the ad off his back and returns home while still well-dressed, running on his way home into the wedding of Don Pascual's daughter. Don Pascual, seeing him elegantly dressed, confuses him with a millionaire and likes the sincerity with which Cantinflas treats him and offers him his friendship.

Through Cantinflas, Don Pascual discovers that his money and himself can be useful to the poor, and provides money for the charitable works Cantinflas does. However, when Simón Sicario, the evil villain of Cantinflas's neighborhood, is murdered and robbed, Cantinflas is believed to be the culprit.

== Cast ==
- Mario Moreno as Cantinflas
- Martha Valdés as Lita
- Ángel Garasa as Don Pascual Lachica
- Domingo Soler as Padre Feliciano
- Wolf Ruvinskis as Chucho the Sacristan
- Miguel Arenas as Don Simón Sicario
- Carlota Solares as Señora de Lachica
- Arturo Martínez as El chivato
- Anabelle Gutiérrez as Luisa, hija de Pascual
- Emma Roldán as Doña Pelos, portera
- Ernesto Finance as Señor Ortiz
- Conchita Gentil Arcos as Doña Manuelita (as Concha Gentil Arcos)
- Amparo Arozamena as María, sirvienta
- Roberto Meyer as Comisario
- Daniel Arroyo as Invitado en fiesta (uncredited)
- León Barroso as Hijo de Ortiz (uncredited)
- Victorio Blanco as Mendigo (uncredited)
- Josefina Burgos as Mujer en hipódromo (uncredited)
- Lupe Carriles as María, clienta de Cantinflas (uncredited)
- Enrique Carrillo as Policía (uncredited)
- Alfonso Carti as Policía (uncredited)
- Manuel Casanueva as Invitado en fiesta (uncredited)
- María Luisa Cortés as Mujer en hipódromo (uncredited)
- Pedro Elviro as Secretario de comisaría (uncredited)
- Lidia Franco as Vecina (uncredited)
- Salvador Godínez as Elevadorista (uncredited)
- Jesús Gómez as Policía (uncredited)
- Leonor Gómez as Vecina (uncredited)
- Guillermo Hernández as Kid Gorila (uncredited)
- Patricia de Morelos as Marta, hija de Pascual (uncredited)
- José Muñoz as Entrenador de Kid Gorila (uncredited)
- Antonio Padilla "Pícoro" as Anunciador del ring (uncredited)
- José Pardavé as Asistente de boxeador (uncredited)
- Salvador Quiroz as Espectador (uncredited)
- Paula Rendón as Vecina (uncredited)
- Salvador Terroba as José, cliente de Cantinflas (uncredited)

== Bibliography ==
- Lentz III, Harris M. Obituaries in the Performing Arts, 2009: Film, Television, Radio, Theatre, Dance, Music, Cartoons and Pop Culture. McFarland, 2016.
- Anuario del cine español. Sindicato Nacional del Espectáculo (SNE), Servicio de Estadística y Publicaciones (SEP), 1955.
- Hernández-Girbal, F. Los que pasaron por Hollywood. BPR Publishers, 1992.
- Historia documental del cine mexicano: 1953-1954. University of Guadalajara, 1992.
- Pilcher, Jeffrey M. Cantinflas and the Chaos of Mexican Modernity. Rowman & Littlefield, 2001.
