= Alcanzar una estrella =

Mexican telenovela

- Genre: Telenovela
- Created by: Jesús Calzada
- Screenplay by: Gabriela Ortigoza
- Directed by: Marco Flavio Cruz; Manolo García
- Creative director: Juan José Urbini
- Starring: Eduardo Capetillo; Mariana Garza; Enrique Lizalde; Rita Macedo
- Country of origin: Mexico
- Original language: Spanish
- No. of episodes: 160

Production
- Executive producer: Luis de Llano
- Production locations: Mexico City, Mexico
- Cinematography: Darío Rangel
- Production company: Televisa

Original release
- Network: Canal de las Estrellas
- Release: May 14 – December 21, 1990

Related
- Hollywood Heights

Alcanzar una estrella ("To reach a star") is a Mexican telenovela first broadcast on Canal de las Estrellas in 1990. Also broadcast in Latin America and on Univision in the United States, the telenovela tells the story of an introverted girl's infatuation with her teen idol. The leading roles were played by singers Mariana Garza and Eduardo Capetillo, ex-members of the Mexican pop band Timbiriche. The two also sang the theme songs, which were written by Ricardo Arjona. Arjona and other singers such as Patricia Manterola (from the group Garibaldi) also made acting cameos. The story was produced by Luis de Llano, producer and manager of Timbiriche and Garibaldi, and written by actress Rita Macedo, de Llano's mother. Alcanzar una estrella turned out to be Macedo's last credit as an actress before she committed suicide in the mid-1990s.

Alcanzar una estrella won a TVyNovelas Award for "Best Telenovela of the Year" in 1991. Its success led to the making of a film, Más que alcanzar una estrella, and a sequel telenovela Alcanzar una estrella II starring Sasha Sokol and Ricky Martin. In 2012, American network Nick at Nite remade it as Hollywood Heights.

== Plot ==
Lorena (Mariana Garza) is an introverted girl who dreams of "reaching a star" - that star being singer Eduardo Casablanca (Eduardo Capetillo). She gets to meet him at a press conference to present his latest album and his first telenovela. Lorena begins to write anonymous letters to Eduardo while her classmates ridicule her bad looks. Eduardo struggles to maintain a relationship with his gold digger girlfriend Déborah (Kenia Gazcón).

== Cast ==
- Eduardo Capetillo as Eduardo Casablanca/Ramón Sánchez
- Mariana Garza as Lorena Gaitán Roca/Melissa
- Ana Silvia Garza as Norma Roca Vda. de Gaitán
- Angélica Ruvalcaba as Aurora Rueda
- Enrique Lizalde as Mariano Casablanca
- Kenia Gazcón as Déborah Lavalle/Guadalupe "Lupita" Patiño
- Oscar Traven as Roque Escamilla
- Marcos Valdés as Amadeus Silva
- Andrea Legarreta as Adriana Mastreta del Castillo
- Héctor Suárez Gomis as Pedro Lugo
- Marcela Páez as Irene de la Fuente
- Daniel Martín as Joaquín de la Fuente
- Alejandro Montoya as Norberto
- Alejandro Ibarra as Felipe Rueda
- Lorena Rojas as Sara del Río
- Dacia González as María de la Luz "Lucha" Rueda
- Luis Bayardo as Gustavo Rueda
- Ernesto Yáñez as Martín Negrete "El Colorado"
- Mayra Rojas as Liliana Rojas
- Octavio Galindo as Octavio Estrada
- Cita Hudgens as Cecilia "Cita" Lugo
- Darío T. Pie as Mario Casablanca
- Adrián Ramos as Manuel Lugo
- Margarita Isabel as Rita del Castillo
- Sergio Klainer as Fernando Mastreta
- Alicia Montoya as Doña Julia Mastreta
- Gabriela Hassel as Tanya de la Riva #1
- Deborah Reisenweber as Tanya de la Riva #2
- Perla de la Rosa as Elisa
- Leonorilda Ochoa as Soledad "Mama Chole" Patiño
- Rita Macedo as Virginia
- Frances Ondiviela as Lola
- Alejandra Israel as Ofelia
- Carlos García as Edgar Navarro
- Gloria Izaguirre as María del Pilar "Pilita" Patiño
- Luz Gracia Lascurain as Sofía
- Botellita de Jerez as Grupo "El Pilón"
- Fernando Arau as Bernardo "Barrabás"
- Wanda Seux as Lucrecia Magaña/Layla Soraya
- Belén Balmori as Vanessa
- Sérgio Ochoa as Alonso
- Ricardo Dalmacci as Dalmacci
- Luis de Llano Macedo as Sr. Estrada
- Tiaré Scanda as herself, Festival de la Canción's contestant
- Héctor Yaber as himself, Festival de la Canción's contestant
- Martha Aguayo as herself, Festival de la Canción's host
- Guillermo Zarur as Juiz
- Maya Ramos as Felicia de la Riva
- Enrique Pais as Enrique de la Riva
- Elena Silva as Isabel
- Zandokan as Palmer
- Cecilia Toussaint as Lic. Cuevas
- David Ostrosky as Lic. del Valle
- Begoña Palacios as Irene's mother
- German Novoa as Carlos Rueda
- Anna Ciocchetti as Sharon

== Soundtrack ==
Alcanzar una estrella

Studio album by Alcanzar una estrella
- Released: 1990
- Recorded: 1989
- Genre: Pop
- Label: Fonovisa

Alcanzar una estrella chronology
Alcanzar una estrella (1990)	Muñecos de Papel (1991)

Alcanzar una estrella is the soundtrack to the telenovela Alcanzar una estrella. It was released in 1990 and contains the first two opening songs for the telenovela "Quiero estar contigo", and "La mujer que no soñe", as well as the closing song "Alcanzar una estrella".

The third opening song "Contra tu cuerpo", performed by Mariana Garza, would not be released until 1992 on the Mas que alcanzar una estrella film soundtrack.

The hit singles off this album were "Alcanzar una estrella" and "La mujer que no soñe".

=== Track listing ===
1. "Alcanzar una estrella" – Mariana Garza
2. "Quiero estar contigo" – Eduardo Capetillo
3. "Reencarnación" – Cita
4. "Deseos intimos" – Eduardo Capetillo & Mariana Garza
5. "Ya ni hablar" – Eduardo Capetillo
6. "Rock, rap de la carcel"
7. "La mujer que soñe" – Eduardo Capetillo - 3:11
8. "Las calles obscuras" – Cita
9. "Voy a cambiar por ti" – Hector Suarez Gomis
10. "Éxito Y Amor" – Eduardo Capetillo
11. "Maldicion gitana" – Marcos Valdes
12. "Tu eres un sueño para mi" – Mariana Garza

== Awards ==
Year	Award	Category	Nominee	Result
1991	9th TVyNovelas Awards	Best Telenovela of the Year	Luis de Llano Macedo	Won
1991	9th TVyNovelas Awards	Best Leading Actress	Rita Macedo	Nominated
1991	9th TVyNovelas Awards	Best Leading Actor	Enrique Lizalde	Nominated
1991	9th TVyNovelas Awards	Best Co-lead Actress	Ana Silvia Garza	Nominated
1991	9th TVyNovelas Awards	Best Co-lead Actress	Andrea Legarreta	Nominated
1991	9th TVyNovelas Awards	Best Co-lead Actress	Marcela Páez	Nominated
1991	9th TVyNovelas Awards	Best Co-lead Actor	Marcos Valdés	Nominated
1991	9th TVyNovelas Awards	Best Co-lead Actor	Héctor Suárez Gomis	Nominated
1991	9th TVyNovelas Awards	Best Female Revelation	Angélica Ruvalcaba	Nominated
1991	9th TVyNovelas Awards	Best Female Revelation	Mariana Garza	Won
1991	9th TVyNovelas Awards	Best Male Revelation	Eduardo Capetillo	Won
1991	9th TVyNovelas Awards	Best Male Revelation	Alejandro Ibarra	Nominated
