= A Thousand and One Nights (1958 film) =

- Directed by: Fernando Cortés
- Written by: María Luisa Algarra (dialogue), Josefina Vicens
- Produced by: Fernando de Fuentes, Gonzalo Elvira, Ramón Pereda
- Starring: Germán Valdés; María Antonieta Pons; Martha Valdés; Mapita Cortés
- Cinematography: Jack Draper
- Edited by: Carlos Savage
- Music by: Manuel Esperón
- Release date: 17 September 1958 (Mexico)
- Running time: 90 min
- Country: Mexico
- Language: Spanish

A Thousand and One Nights (Spanish:Las mil y una noches) is a 1958 Mexican comedy film produced by Fernando de Fuentes, directed by Fernando Cortés and starring Germán Valdés "Tin-Tan", María Antonieta Pons, Martha Valdés and Mapita Cortés. This is Tin-Tan's first color film (filmed in Eastmancolor, also considered as Mexico's Technicolor) and was followed by a sequel filmed the same year, La odalisca No. 13. This film marked the film debut of the Puerto Rican-American actress and model, Mapita Cortés.

== Cast ==
- Germán Valdés "Tin-Tan" - Ven Aquí
- María Antonieta Pons - Ven Acá
- Óscar Pulido - Sultán Ali Pus
- Martha Valdés - Soberana Sobeyra
- Mapita Cortés - Yamirka
- Marcelo Chávez
- Manuel "El Loco" Valdés
- Miguel Arenas - Sultán de Basora
- Elena Julián
- Ramón Valdés
- Silvia Carrillo - Odalisca
- Roberto Y. Palacios
- Leticia Julián
- Antonio "El Ratón" Valdés

== Production ==
The production of the film took place in 1957.
