= El vendedor de muñecas =

El Vendedor de muñecas
- Directed by: Chano Urueta
- Produced by: Andrés Jullian (associate producer); Adolfo Lagos (producer)
- Music by: Gonzalo Curiel
- Release date: 1955
- Running time: 105 min
- Country: Mexico
- Language: Spanish

El Vendedor de muñecas ("The Seller of Dolls") is a 1955 Mexican film directed by Chano Urueta.

== Plot ==
Roberto (Pedro López Lagar) is dedicated to recruiting young beautiful women for using them in a financial scam. He asks them to pretend that they are married to him but then offers them to rich men, who are willing to pay large amounts of money for these women. Roberto's business runs smoothly until he meets Diana (Silvia Pinal), a young singer who falls in love with him.

== Cast ==
- Eduardo Alcaraz
- Miguel Córcega
- Bárbara Gil
- José María Linares-Rivas
- Pedro López Lagar
- Mary López
- Pilar Pellicer
- Silvia Pinal
- Elvira Quintana
- Raúl Ramírez
- Jorge Reyes
- Eliana Silly
- Martha Valdés
