= Mundo Feliz =

Studio album by Fobia
- Released: 1 January 1991
- Genre: Rock en español
- Label: RCA International

Fobia chronology
Fobia (1990)	Mundo Feliz (1991)	Leche (1993)

Mundo Feliz was the second album released by Mexican rock band Fobia in 1991.

== Track listing ==
1. Brincas (Jump)
2. El Pepinillo Marino (The sea cucumber)
3. Camila (Camila)
4. El cerebro (The brain)
5. Caminitos hacia el Cosmos (Little roads towards the Cosmos)
6. El diablo (The devil)
7. La fecha especial (The special date)
8. Sacúdeme (Shake me)
9. Mi pequeño corazón (My little heart)
10. Mundo feliz (Happy world)
11. Apachurrar el corazón (Smashing the heart)

== Personnel ==
- Leonardo de Lozanne: vocals
- Cha!: bass
- Francisco Huidobro: guitar
- Gabriel: drums
- Iñaki: keyboards
