= It Is Never Too Late to Love =

1953 film by Tito Davison

- Directed by: Tito Davison
- Written by: Tito Davison; Ricardo López Méndez; Ulises Petit de Murat; Gregorio Walerstein
- Produced by: Gregorio Walerstein
- Starring: Libertad Lamarque; Roberto Cañedo; José Elías Moreno
- Cinematography: José Ortiz Ramos
- Edited by: Rafael Ceballos
- Production company: Cinematográfica Filmex
- Release date: 31 July 1953
- Running time: 96 minutes
- Country: Mexico
- Language: Spanish

It Is Never Too Late to Love (Spanish: Nunca es tarde para amar) is a 1953 Mexican drama film directed by Tito Davison and starring Libertad Lamarque, Roberto Cañedo and José Elías Moreno.

== Partial cast ==
- Libertad Lamarque as Malisa Morales
- Roberto Cañedo as Claudio Pérez de Castro
- José Elías Moreno as Doctor Zamora
- José Baviera as Señor Rodríguez
- Dolores Tinoco as Rosario
- Jesús Valero as Lic. Bustamante
- Andrés Velázquez as Quique
- Martha Valdés as Amelia
- Manuel 'Loco' Valdés

== Bibliography ==
- María Luisa Amador. Cartelera cinematográfica, 1950-1959. UNAM, 1985.
