= Leche (Fobia album) =

Studio album by Fobia
- Released: 14 September 1993
- Genre: Rock en español
- Label: RCA International

Fobia chronology
Mundo Feliz (1991)	Leche (1993)	Amor Chiquito (1995)

Leche is an album released by Mexican rock band Fobia. The word "Leche" means milk in Spanish. This was their third album.

== Track listing ==
1. Plástico (Plastic)
2. Los cibernoides (The cibernoids)
3. Fiebre (Fever)
4. No me amenaces (Don't threaten me)
5. "_____"
6. Miel del escorpión (The scorpion's honey)
7. Perra policía (Bitch police)
8. Regrésame a Júpiter (Take me back to Jupiter)
9. Maten al D.J. (Kill the DJ)
10. Tú me asustas (You scare me)
11. Los cibernoides (The cibernoids)
12. Jonathan Bonus track

== Personnel ==
- Paco Huidobro: Guitar
- Leonardo de Lozanne: Vocals
- Cha!: Bass
- Iñaki: Keyboards
- Gabriel Kuri: Drums
