= Micro Chips =

Mexican rock band (1987–1993)

Microchips
- Origin: Torreón, Mexico
- Genres: Latin rock, pop rock
- Years active: 1987–1993
- Website: instagram.com/micro_chips

Microchips (also styled Micro Chips and M.I.C.R.O. C.H.I.P.S.) was a Mexican children's rock music group active from 1987 to 1993.

== History ==
In 1987 Javier Willy (keyboard) and Daniel Willy (drums) from Torreón, Mexico, decided to start a band. Soon after, Ricardo Villa (lead guitar) and Sergio Robles (bass guitar) joined them under the name Explotion. Later they were joined by Jay de la Cueva. To expand their regional musical career and supported by their parents, they moved to Mexico City, where TV and record producer Luis de Llano Macedo, recognizing their potential he signed them and added his son, Tito de Llano. Finally, the Willy brothers invited their sister, Toti Willy, and this lineup became Micro Chips. (TV interview)

Their first album, Niños Eléctricos, (Electric Children) with original music by Spanish composer Miguel Rios, was recorded in early 1988 with the advice and help from Ricardo Ochoa (musician and producer). They released three singles. No quiero (I don't want to), Angello which was composed specially for one of the "Menudo" members (Angelo Garcia) and gained popularity on the radio, and Boomerang, a track for a roller coaster ride in Mexico City. This record received a gold award for its high sales.

In 1989 the band radically changed when Javier, Daniel and Toti Willy decided to return to Torreón, in order to continue their studies. They later formed Rock Kids which signed with Polygram Records and released two albums.

Microchips continued and looked for new band members, and found them in Mariana Navarro (Vocals), Jorge Mercado (Keyboards) and Tomás Pérez-Ascencio (Drums and Vocals). A single was released simply called Batimix (Batmix) while preparing the next album. This was during the 1989 Tim Burton's "Batman" craze.

De Película (Movielike) from 1989 was the group's second album. Produced again by Ricardo Ochoa. With participation by Aleks Syntek and Jorge "Chiquis" Amaro as composers. Engineered and recorded by Juan Switalski. Several singles were released, "Grandes Años Del Rock And Roll", a cover of Jive Bunny's "Swing the Mood". Perro Lanudo (Fluffy Dog) was also released as a single. At the end of the subsequent tour Mariana Navarro left the group.

In 1990 Energía es Amor was released, produced by Marco Flores and recorded at Dallas Sound Lab studios., this time two new female singers join, Yani Contreras from Mexico City and Jessica Herreman from Guadalajara. Several singles were released from this album, Including Quiero Ser (I Want To Be) and Tiempo al Tiempo (Give Time the Time). This album also has songs written by Marco Flores, Ricardo Arjona, and band members Jay de la Cueva, Ricardo Villa and Tomás Pérez-Ascencio.

1992 brought No Somos Números. Produced by Óscar Flores was the fourth and final album, again there were band member changes. Anna Borrás (Vocals) formerly at La Onda Vaselina/OV7 comes in place of Yani, and Alejandro Santoyo (Keyboards) comes in place of Jorge. The album is recorded in New York City and includes two cover songs from Jovanotti which also became two hit singles. Números-I Numeri (Numbers) and Sácalo-Diritti E Doveri (Rights and Duties). They toured extensively in Mexico and also did some concerts in the US.

In 1993 the band decided to record a new album and started looking for a new name, since they were no longer children. However this never happened, and the musicians continued their musical careers separately.

In April 2014 the band's Facebook page announced the re-release, on April 22, 2014, of the Niños Eléctricos album, celebrating its 25th anniversary and the Mexican holiday, Children's Day, on April 30.

On February 23, 2024, on the band's Facebook page was announced the 35th Anniversary release by Universal Music México, of the Album "Niños Electricos" on March 8, 2024, featuring 3 bonus tracks, never released.

== Band members ==
=== Original lineup (Mark I) ===
- Javier Willy (Keyboards and Vocals)
- Daniel Willy (Drums and Vocals)
- Toti Willy (Vocals)
- Ricardo Villa (Lead Guitar and Vocals)
- Jay de la Cueva (Bass and Vocals)
- Tito De Llano (Guitar and Vocals)

=== Second generation (Mark II) ===
- Ricardo Villa (Lead Guitar and Vocals)
- Jay de la Cueva (Bass and Lead Vocals)
- Tito de Llano (Guitar and Vocals)
- Tomás Pérez-Ascencio (Drums and Vocals)
- Jorge Mercado (Keyboards)
- Mariana Navarro (Vocals)

=== Third generation (Mark III) ===
- Ricardo Villa (Lead Guitar and Vocals)
- Jay de la Cueva (Bass and Lead Vocals)
- Tito de Llano (Guitar and Vocals)
- Tomás Pérez-Ascencio (Drums and Vocals)
- Jorge Mercado (Keyboards)
- Jessica Herreman (Vocals)
- Yani Contreras (Vocals)

=== Fourth Generation (Mark IV) ===
- Ricardo Villa (Lead Guitar and Vocals)
- Jay de la Cueva (Bass and Lead Vocals)
- Tito de Llano (Guitar and Vocals)
- Tomás Pérez-Ascencio (Drums and Vocals)
- Jessica Herreman (Vocals)
- Anna Borrás (Vocals)
- Alejandro Santoyo (Keyboards and Vocals)

== Discography ==
From:

- 1988: Niños Eléctricos (Melody MITV-176, LP)
1. No Quiero
2. Las Máquinas
3. Angello
4. Perdidos En La Distancia
5. Boomerang
6. Rock de La Cárcel
7. Niños Eléctricos
8. Quiero Cantar Rock And Roll
9. Ser Feliz
10. Horrible Pesadilla
11. Recuerdos
12. La Pared
- 1989: Batimix (Melody SU/082, 12 in Extended Single)
- 1989: De Película (Melody MEPR/7010, LP)
1. Grandes Años Del Rock And Roll
2. No Digas Para Nada
3. Rock En El Universo
4. Despertar
5. Juguemos a Batman
6. Microtecnochips
7. Quiero Que Sepas
8. Perro Lanudo
9. Un Sueño Para Ti
10. Batimix
- 1990: Energia Es Amor (Melody LMD/613, LP)
1. Energia
2. Quiero Ser
3. Tiempo Al Tiempo
4. Oyendo Tu Voz
5. Tu Amor Mi Vitamina
6. A La Hora de Cantar
7. A La Luz de La Luna
8. Ganas
9. Por Eso Te Quiero
10. No Me Puedo Dejar Derribar

1992: No Somos Números (Melody LMD/746, LP)

1. Sirena
2. Números
3. Playa
4. Sombra
5. Ángeles
6. Miente
7. Lugar
8. Sácalo
9. Destino
10. Chipicucu
- 2024: Niños Eléctricos 35 Aniversario
1. No Quiero
2. Las Máquinas
3. Angello
4. Perdidos En La Distancia
5. Boomerang
6. Rock de La Cárcel
7. Niños Eléctricos
8. Quiero Cantar Rock And Roll
9. Ser Feliz
10. Horrible Pesadilla
11. Recuerdos
12. La Pared
13. Rock Queremos - 2024
14. Televisor - Bonus Track 1988
15. Soldedad - Bonus Track 1988
