= Madness of Love =

- Directed by: Rafael Baledón
- Written by: Ramón Obón; Gregorio Walerstein
- Produced by: Alfredo Ripstein hijo Gregorio Walerstein
- Starring: Niní Marshall; Óscar Pulido; Yolanda Montes "Tongolele"
- Cinematography: Agustín Jiménez
- Edited by: Juan José Marino
- Music by: Sergio Guerrero
- Production company: Cinematográfica Filmex
- Release date: 19 February 1953
- Running time: 100 minutes
- Country: Mexico
- Language: Spanish

Madness of Love (Spanish: Amor de locura) is a 1953 Mexican comedy film directed by Rafael Baledón and starring Niní Marshall and Yolanda Montes "Tongolele".

== Cast ==
- Niní Marshall as Juana / Juana La Loca / Catalina
- Óscar Pulido as Don Felipe Hermosillo
- Yolanda Montes "Tongolele" as Aldara
- Antonio Aguilar as Álvaro
- Pedro de Aguillón as Don Filiberto
- Rafael Banquells as Representante
- Lupe Carriles as Elvira
- Alfonso Iglesias Padre as Don Fidencio
- Hermanos Reyes
- Luz María Aguilar as Chica en la corte de la reina
- Daniel Arroyo as Cliente en cabaret
- Stephen Berne as Hombre en fiesta de palacio
- Manuel Casanueva as Pintor
- Cecilia Leger as Clienta en cabaret
- Concepción Martínez as Clienta en restaurante
- Luis Manuel Pelayo as Mesero en cabaret
- Carlos Robles Gil as Cliente en cabaret
- Félix Samper as Cliente en cabaret
- Manuel 'Loco' Valdés as Bailarín
- Hernán Vera as Portero
- Acela Vidaurri as Chica vende cigarillos

== Bibliography ==
- María Luisa Amador. Cartelera cinematográfica, 1950-1959. UNAM, 1985.
