= Martha Valdés =

Mexican actress (1928–2014)

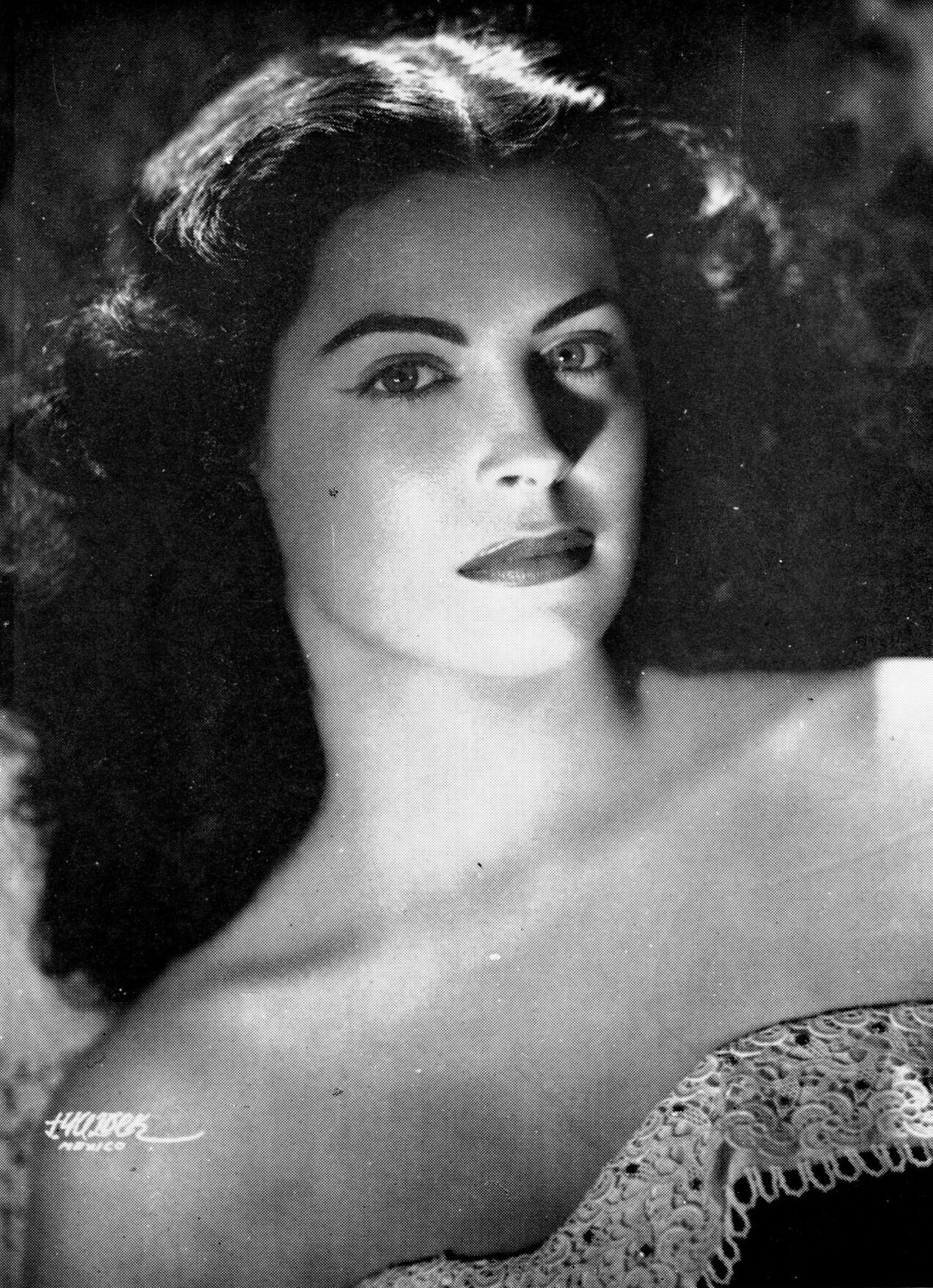
- Martha Valdés in 1954
- Born: 1 January 1928; Tijuana, Baja California, Mexico
- Died: 20 November 2014 (aged 86)
- Occupation: Actress
- Years active: 1953–1959
- Spouse: Carlos Mariscal Martinez
- Children: Adriana Roel Silva, Carlos Mariscal, Mauricio Mariscal

Martha Valdés (1 January 1928 – 20 November 2014) was a Mexican actress. She is known for her work in several films during the Golden Age of Mexican cinema in the 1950s before disappearing from the scene at the end of those decade, such as Espaldas mojadas (1955), Cómicos de la legua (1957), Música de siempre (1958), and Vagabundo y millonario (1959).

== Filmography ==
Year	Title	Role	Notes
1953	The Unfaithful	Consuelo	
1953	It Is Never Too Late to Love	Amelia	
1954	The Three Elenas	Esther	
1954	A Tailored Gentleman	Lita	
1954	El hombre inquieto	Elena Caim	
1955	El vendedor de muñecas		
1955	Magdalena	Lucila	
1955	Espaldas mojadas	Mary	
1957	Cómicos de la Legua	Celeste Luna	
1957	Puss Without Boots	Laura del Castillo	
1957	Three and a Half Musketeers	Lady Winter	
1958	Las tres pelonas	Lucy	
1958	Música de siempre		
1958	Ladrones de niños	Carmen	
1958	El águila negra vs. los diablos de la pradera	Patricia	
1958	La marca del cuervo		
1958	A Thousand and One Nights	Soberana Sobeyra	
1958	El águila negra contra los enmascarados de la muerte	Patricia	
1959	Vagabundo y millonario	Carterista	(final film role)

== Bibliography ==
- Ayala Blanco, Jorge. Aventura del cine mexicano. Ediciones Era, 1968.
- Sánchez, Francisco. Crónica antisolemne del cine mexicano. Universidad Veracruzana, 1989.
- García Riera, Emilio. Historia documental del cine mexicano: 1955. Ediciones Era, 1969.
- Amador, María Luisa. Cartelera cinematográfica, 1950–1959. UNAM, 1985.
- García Riera, Emilio. Historia documental del cine mexicano: 1958. Ediciones Era, 1975.
