= Lorena Rojas =

Mexican actress and singer (1971–2015)

Seidy Lorena Rojas
- Born: Seydi Lorena Rojas Gonzalez; 10 February 1971; Mexico City, Mexico
- Died: 16 February 2015 (aged 44); Miami, Florida, U.S.
- Occupations: Actress, singer
- Years active: 1990–2015
- Spouse: Patrick Shaas (m. 2001; div. 2005)
- Partner(s): Armando Araiza (2010–2012); Jorge Monje (2013–2015)
- Children: 1 (adopted)

Lorena Rojas (born Seydi Lorena Rojas Gonzalez; 10 February 1971 – 16 February 2015) was a Mexican actress and singer, best known for her leading roles in popular telenovelas.

== Biography ==
Seydi Lorena Rojas Gonzalez was born in Mexico City, Mexico and began her artistic career in 1990 when she participated in the telenovela Alcanzar Una Estrella produced by Televisa. This telenovela was so successful that she went on to record a sequel Alcanzar Una Estrella II the following year. Between 1992 and 1997 she starred in several Televisa productions including Buscando El Paraiso, Bajo Un Mismo Rostro and El Alma No Tiene Color until she signed to TV Azteca in 1998.

This same year, she starred in the period drama Azul Tequila, sharing credits with Mauricio Ochmann, with whom she would later star in 2001's Como En El Cine. 2001 also saw the release of Rojas's debut album as a singer Como Yo No Hay Ninguna, recording songs by legendary songwriter/producer Richard Daniel Roman. In 2003, Rojas signed to Telemundo, later taping in that same year the telenovela Ladrón De Corazones besides Manolo Cardona. In 2005, she starred in her most acclaimed telenovela El cuerpo del deseo, beside Andrés García, Mario Cimarro, Erick Elías, and Sonia Noemí, among others, which proved to be an international success, broadcast by Telemundo. In 2006 she released her second album, Deseo.

== Death ==
On 16 February 2015, Rojas died of breast cancer, six days after her 44th birthday, in Miami, Florida. She had been battling the disease since 2008, and it had spread to other organs, including her liver.

== Filmography ==
Year	Title	Role	Notes	Ref.
1990	Alcanzar una estrella	Sara del Río	Antagonist	
1991	Alcanzar una estrella II	Sara del Río	Antagonist	
1992	Baila conmigo	Rosario	Supporting Role	
1993–1994	Buscando el paraíso	Lolita	Supporting Role	
1995	Bajo un mismo rostro	Carolina	Supporting Role	
1996	Canción de amor	Ana	Protagonist	
1997	El alma no tiene color	Ana Luisa Roldán	Antagonist	
1998	Tentaciones	Julia Muñóz	Protagonist	
1998	Azul tequila	Catalina	Special Appearance	
1999–2000	El candidato	Beatriz Manrique	Protagonist	
2001–2002	Como en el cine	Isabel "Chabela" Montero	Protagonist	
2003	Ladrón de corazones	Verónica Vega	Protagonist	
2004	Zapata: Amor en rebeldía	Rosa Escandón	TV-Series	
2005–2006	El cuerpo del deseo	Isabel Arroyo	Main Protagonist / Antagonist	
2007	Decisiones	Lorena	Episode: "Bloque de hielo"	
2007–2008	Pecados ajenos	Natalia Ruiz	Protagonist	
2010–2011	Entre el amor y el deseo	Claudia Fontana Martínez	Protagonist	
2013	Rosario	Priscila Pavón	Antagonist	
2015	Demente criminal	Verónica García	TV-Series	

== Discography ==
- Como Yo No Hay Ninguna (Azteca Music) (2001)
- Deseo (Big Moon Records) (2006)
