= Eduardo Capetillo =

Mexican actor and singer

- Born: Eduardo Capetillo Vázquez; April 13, 1970 (age 56); Mexico City, Mexico
- Occupations: Actor, singer
- Years active: 1983–present
- Spouse: Bibi Gaytán (1994–present)
- Children: 5
- Parent(s): Manuel Capetillo; María del Carmen Vázquez Alcaide

Eduardo Capetillo Vázquez (born April 13, 1970) is a Mexican actor and singer.

== Life ==
He was born in Mexico City, Mexico. He belongs to the Capetillo family, who have a long tradition of being bullfighters.

While still very young, he participated in some courses of preparation with the actress Martha Zabaleta and some courses of jazz in the center of qualification of Televisa. His career started when he participated at the Juguemos a Cantar festival, where he won the second place with the song Mi grupo toca Rock (My band plays rock, not to be confused with Menudo's similarly named "Mi Banda Toca Rock"), later launched by.

He participated in the Spanish theater version of Grease, Vaselina, and recorded his first telenovela in 1983 called Martín Garatuza.

In 1986, Eduardo entered Timbiriche, replacing Benny Ibarra. Success followed through Rock Shows, on Timbiriche VI album, and subsequently recording more hits with albums Timbiriche VII, Timbiriche VIII and Timbiriche lX. Capetillo sang various solos that became hits, such as No seas tan cruel, Todo Cambia, Con todos menos conmigo. He then toured Mexico and some Latin American countries.

In 1989, Capetillo left the group and began his career as a solo artist. In 1991 he sold more than a million copies of the album of five songs, sound track of the telenovela Alcanzar una estrella.

That same year he launched his album Dame Una Noche. In 1992 he returned as an actor and singer thanks to another telenovela, Baila conmigo, and to his second album, Estoy Aquí.

Later he released a new album, Piel Ajena (1995), and a career in which the formula is mixed actor-singer in telenovelas, that strengthens him as an idol in the Latin world thanks to titles like Marimar, together with Thalía, that was seen in more than 150 countries, or Canción de amor, Camila or El secreto, in which he and Yadhira Carrillo are the only Mexican actors of a Spanish cast.

Thanks to the telenovela El secreto, seen on Spanish television (the TVE), Capetillo has returned to record a new album, with Horus-Muxxic, registered in diverse studios of Mexico and Spain, with a production directed and made by his brother-in-law Chacho Gaytán. The album includes the hit song "El Secreto", the main theme of the telenovela, composed, arranged and produced by Federico Vaona in 2001–2002. In 2003 he also interpreted one of the songs of the telenovela Bajo la misma piel. In 2004 he appeared in Amy, la niña de la mochila azúl. His most recent telenovela is Peregrina, a story of an 18-year-old circus girl who discovers her real family.

Capetillo is married to actress and singer Bibi Gaytán, his partner from the Timbiriche years. They have five children: Eduardo (born August 17, 1994), Ana Paula (born 1997), Alejandra (born 1999), Manuel and Daniel Capetillo (born June 20, 2014).

== Telenovelas ==
Year	Title	Character	Note
2022	Donde hubo fuego	Ricardo Urzúa Lozano	Protagonist
2012–13	La Otra Cara del Alma	Roberto Cano	Protagonist
2010	Soy tu dueña	Horacio Acosta	Co-Protagonist
2009	Pecadora	Bruno Alcocer / Bernny Alcocer	Protagonist
2008	En Nombre del Amor	Javier Espinosa de los Monteros	Special appearance
2008	Fuego en la sangre	Pedro Reyes	Special appearance
2005–06	Peregrina	Rodolfo Alcocer/Aníbal Alcocer	Protagonist and Antagonist
2005	La Madrastra	Leonel Ibáñez	Co-Protagonist
2004	Amy, la niña de la mochila azul	Payaso Cuqui/Octavio Betancourt	Adult Protagonist
2002–03	¡Vivan los niños!	Emiliano Leal	Adult Protagonist
2001	El Secreto	Fernando Salazar	Protagonist
1998	Camila	Miguel Gutiérrez	Protagonist
1996	Canción de amor	Renzo	Protagonist
1994	Marimar	Sergio Santibañez	Protagonist
1992	Baila conmigo	Eddy López	Protagonist
1991	Alcanzar una estrella II	Eduardo Casablanca	Special appearance
1990	Alcanzar una estrella	Eduardo Casablanca	Protagonist
1989	Morir para vivir	Víctor	Protagonist
1986	Martín Garatuza	Román Garatuza	Co-Protagonist
