= Amor Chiquito =

Studio album by Fobia
- Released: December 22, 1995
- Genre: Rock en español
- Label: RCA International

Fobia chronology
Leche (1993)	Amor Chiquito (1995)	Fobia on Ice (1997)

Amor Chiquito is the fourth album released by Mexican rock band Fobia in 1995. Of previous albums, "Amor Chiquito" possesses a broader range of melodies, from Hard Rock tunes ("Revolución sin manos", "Descontrol"), to more melodic themes ("Hipnotízame", "Vivo"), to pop songs like "Sin querer". Fobia's signature sound does not change, staying true to its eclectic lyrics full of surreal imagery. Ten more years would pass before Fobia would sit together again to record another LP.

== The band ==
- Paco Huidobro: Guitars, Chorus
- Leonardo de Lozanne: Vocals, Chorus
- Iñaki: Keyboards, Programming, Chorus
- Cha!: Bass

=== Guest artists ===
- Jorge Amaro "Chiquis": Drums, Percussions
- Jay de la Cueva: Drums, Percussions

== Track listing ==
1. Revolución Sin Manos
2. Descontrol
3. Vestida Para Matar
4. Hipnotízame
5. Ai Kan Bugui
6. Veneno Vil
7. Mira Teté (Mientras Más Fumo, Más Te Quiero)
8. Sin Querer
9. Casi Amor
10. Vivo
11. Casa Vacía
12. Estrellas En La Panza
