= Fobia =

Mexican rock band

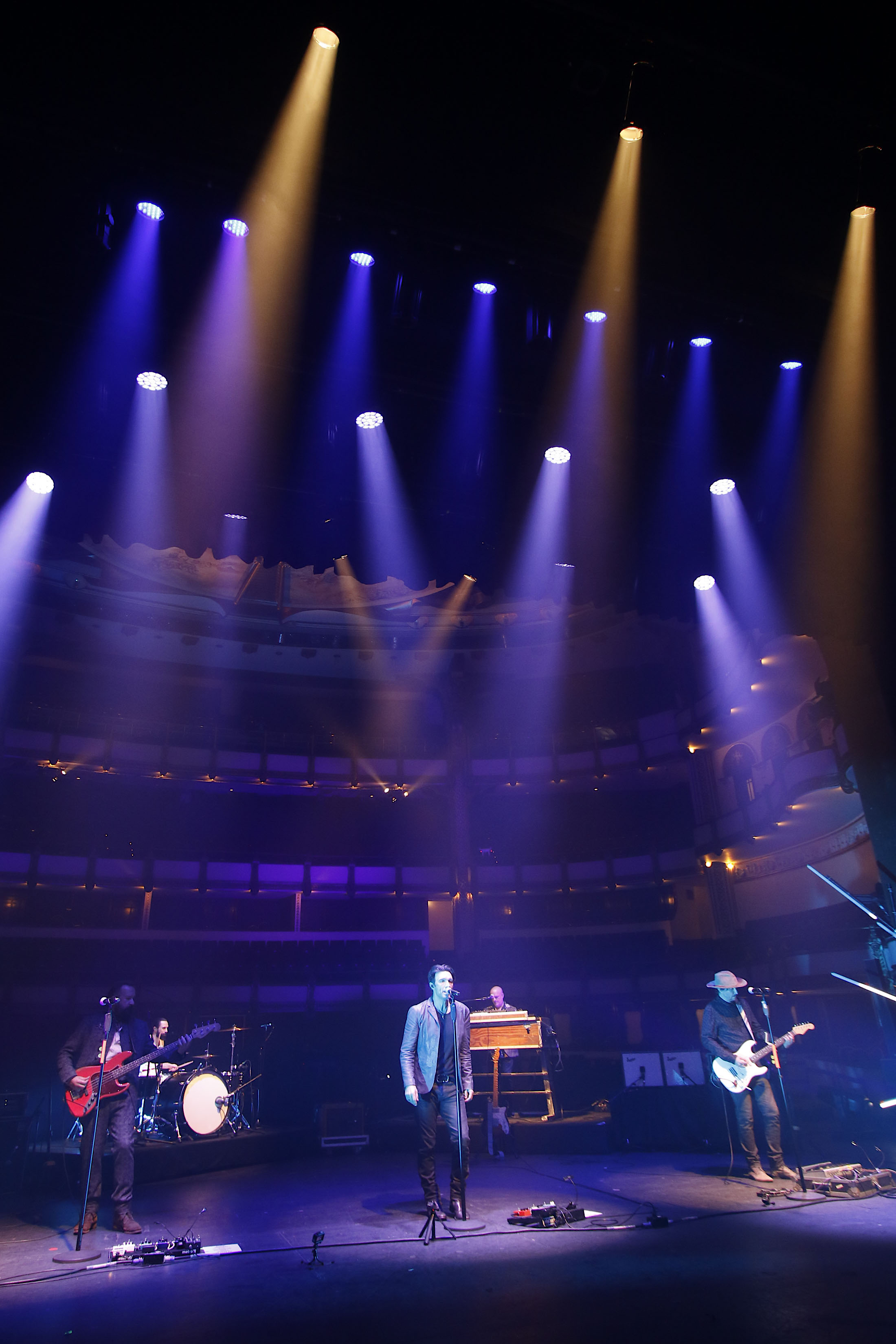

Background information
- Origin: Mexico City, Mexico
- Genres: Rock en español Alternative rock
- Years active: 1987–1997 and 2003–Present
- Labels: Sony Music; BMG Records; RCA Records
- Members: Leonardo de Lozanne; Francisco "Paco" Huidobro; Javier Ramírez "El Cha!"; Jay de la Cueva; Iñaki Vazquez
- Past members: Gabriel Kuri; Jorge 'La Chiquis' Amaro
- Website: https://www.fobia30.com/

Fobia is a Mexican rock en español band from Mexico City.

== History ==
The band was formed in 1987 by Leonardo de Lozanne and Francisco "Paco" Huidobro, brother of Micky Huidobro of Molotov. The original lineup consisted of Lozanne, Huidobro, bassist Javier Ramírez "El Cha!", keyboardist Iñaki Vazquez, and Gabriel Kuri on drums. Kuri was later replaced by Jorge ‘Chiquis’ Amaro who was followed by multi-instrumentalist Jay de la Cueva, (lead singer of the Mexican glam metal band Moderatto).

Fobia was one of the original bands to emerge from the rock en español / Rock en tu idioma (Rock in your language) boom of the late 1980s, alongside Caifanes, Maná, Neón, Maldita Vecindad y los Hijos del Quinto Patio and Los Amantes de Lola; all of which followed in the footsteps of Soda Stereo – who by the late 1980s had amassed a huge following in the Americas. In December 1987, RCA Ariola de México held a "Rock en tu idioma" battle of the bands contest in Mexico City. Fobia was eliminated early on and Los Amantes de Lola went on to win the contest. In spite of their early elimination, executives from Ariola decided to schedule an appointment with Fobia. According to legend, the band missed their meeting with Ariola because they weren't able to enter the building due to problems with security. Following the incident, the band's luck improved. Saúl Hernández of Caifanes produced their first demos and Ariola eventually signed them.

Fobia's early sound, like many of the genre, was heavily influence by 80's new wave with a few notable exceptions: David Bowie and Kiss. Fobia's music has always embraced the fantastic and eccentric and contains large doses of irony and humor. Fobia steered clear of the political and cultural themes that were embraced by their contemporaries. According to Lozanne, "I think it was more of a strategy of the record companies. We never felt like we were part of a movement. We didn't dress like the other bands. We didn't sing about the things they were singing about".

The name Fobia was chosen because it described the insecurities, fears, and personal obsessions of the band members. These were transformed into melodies and music, and materialized into their first songs; "El microbito", "La iguana" and "El crucifijo", which they played in small bars and at house parties.

Fobia's self-titled debut album Fobia cemented their reputation as an innovative and original rock en español act. Produced by Oscar López, their self-titled album yielded classics such as "El Microbito", "El Crucifijo", and "La Iguana". In 1990, Fobia toured with Caifanes, Maná, and Maldita Vecindad y los Hijos del Quinto Patio as part as a promotional tour for the emerging batch of Mexican rock bands.

The following year Fobia released Mundo Feliz (Happy World) which was recorded in Mexico City and at the Power Station in New York City, again with Marteen. Mundo Feliz yielded "Camilla" and "El Diablo". The album featured a cameo by Mexican rock/pop diva Alejandra Guzmán.

In 1993 Fobia release Leche (Milk), a decidedly more experimental album, infusing Latin rhythms and alternative rock. The self-produced album became Fobia's least successful album to date. The lead single, "Los Cibernoides" (Cybernoids) was a critique of the Mexican media conglomerate Televisa. Regardless of sales, Leche was a critical success. Leche saw the departure of original drummer Gabriel Kuri.

For 1995's Amor Chiquito (Small Love) Fobia enlisted famed Argentine producer and composer Gustavo Santaolalla who had a long string of production credits during the 1990s, producing albums for Mexican acts such as Café Tacuba, Caifanes, Molotov, and Julieta Venegas. The album was mixed by Jim Kerr and Tony Peluso, ex guitarist of The Carpenters. For Amor Chiquito, original drummer Gabriel Kuri was replaced by Jorge (Chiquis) Amaro, former drummer of Neón.

Amor Chiquito was a more direct sounding album. The lead single “Revolucion sin Manos” was a guitar driven 4/4 stomper. Amor put Fobia back on top of the rock en español food chain. Fobia toured the U.S. and Latin America. Following the release of the album Kuri was replaced by Jay de la Cueva, currently of Moderatto, who at the time had worked with teen pop group Micro Chips and played drums for Las Víctimas del Doctor Cerebro.

In 1997 Fobia participated in a Queen tribute album with "Under Pressure" ("Presionando"). That same year Fobia released the live album Fobia on Ice. Fobia disbanded in 1997.

== Reunion ==
In 2004 Fobia reunited and released a greatest hits compilation album titled Wow 87*04. Wow 87*04 was followed by Fobia's fifth studio album Rosa Venus (Venus Rose). To promote the record, Fobia toured the U.S. and Latin America. Following the release of Rosa Venus and the subsequent tour Fobia returned to Mexico City to play a series of shows including an opening slot for the Rolling Stones held at El Foro Sol. To honor their 20th anniversary in 2007 Fobia released XX a compilation of live tracks recorded during their 2005 tour. The album included acoustic versions as well as new arrangements of old songs. This disc was accompanied by a documentary/music video DVD.

In April 2011, Fobia gave a rousing performance at the 11th Vive Latino – Festival Iberoamericano de Cultura Musical, one of the most important music festivals in Latin America. Fobia previewed "La Búsqueda" a song from their upcoming album. Since then, the band released Destruye Hogares in 2012.

In early 2019 Fobia played in 'El Palacio de los deportes' field for 17,000 fans to celebrate its 30th years anniversary and played 32 songs and releasing 'Pastel' on march the 1st with their main hits and many other songs live.

== Members ==
- Leonardo de Lozanne: Lead singer
- Francisco "Paco" Huidobro: Lead guitar
- Javier 'Cha!' Ramírez: Bass Guitar
- Jay de la Cueva: Drums
- Iñaki Vázquez: Keyboards

Former Members

- Gabriel Kuri: Drums
- Jorge 'Chiquis' Amaro: Drums

== Discography ==
- Fobia (1990)
- Mundo Feliz (1991)
- Leche (1993)
- Amor Chiquito (1995)
- Fobia on Ice (1997), live album
- Wow 87*04 (2004)
- Rosa Venus (2005)
- XX (2007), live album
- Destruye Hogares (2012)
- Pastel (live album, includes two CD's and one DVD) (2019)
- MTV Unplugged (Live acoustic album) (2020)
