= Manzana verde =

Liqueur made of wild apples

A bottle of manzana verde

Manzana, also known as manzanita and manzana verde, is a liqueur generally made of wild apples. The name verde refers to the apples and not the alcoholic beverage which is usually clear in color. It has Spanish origins, more precisely of the Basque country. Its name manzana is apple in Spanish; verde is Spanish for "green".

Manzana contains from 15 to 20% per volume of alcohol. It is sweet and tastes like green apples, similar in taste to pucker.

== See also ==
- Apple
- Cider
