= Fobia (album) =

Album by Fobia

Studio album by Fobia
- Released: June 30, 1990
- Recorded: 1990
- Genre: Rock en español
- Label: RCA International

Fobia chronology
Fobia (1990)	Mundo Feliz (1991)

Fobia is an album released by Mexican pop rock band Fobia. Their self-titled debut album was released in 1990.

The band received critical and commercial success.

== Track listing ==
- All songs written by Francisco "Paco" Huidobro, except track 4 (Huidobro, Cha! and Kuri)
1. Los muñecos (The Dolls)
2. Dios bendiga a los gusanos (God bless the worms)
3. Las moscas (Flies)
4. El cumpleaños (The birthday)
5. Corazón en caracol (Heart in snail)
6. La iguana (The iguana)
7. Pudriendo (Rotting)
8. Puedo rascarme solo (I can scratch myself)
9. El microbito (The little microbe)
10. El crucifijo (The crucifix)

== Personnel ==
- Leonardo de Lozanne: vocals, acoustic guitar and harmonica
- Francisco "Paco" Huidobro: rhythm, lead and acoustic guitars, bouzouki, backing vocals
- Iñaki: keyboards, backing vocals
- Cha!: bass
- Gabriel Kuri: drums, percussion, drum programming, backing vocals
