= Marisa de Lille =

Mexican singer and actress (born 1966)

- Born: Marisa de Lille Buenfil; April 15, 1966 (age 58); Mexico City, Mexico
- Occupations: Singer; Actress
- Years active: 1979–present
- Website: www.marisadelille.org

Marisa de Lille (born Marisa de Lille Buenfil April 15, 1966) is a Mexican singer and actress. She is the sister of fellow artist Luis de Lille. She is known for performing the songs for the Latin-American Spanish dubs of anime tv shows like Dragon Ball, Sailor Moon and Digimon.

== Biography ==
Marisa began her career very young. She first sang at 9 months of age. At age 13, she debuted as a soloist in the Palacio de Bellas Artes. Among the public was the television presenter Jorge Saldaña. He was so impressed that he decided to invite her to his TV show. There, she was presented as a "youthful revelation". In the coming years, Marisa offer opera concerts.

=== Professional singing career ===
In 1986, would record their first album and video entitled "No soy igual", pop rock genre, with the help of the discographic "Perless". Since 1994, Marisa worked with the company dubbing Intertrack as a performer of songs of animated series like Dragon Ball, Sailor Moon, Digimon, Dr. Slump, Bikkuriman, Slam Dunk, and Sally the Witch, among others.

Many of these themes have been re-recorded by herself in an "extended version " and subsequently published by "Anison Latino", in 2011. She has shared the stage with bands like Mecano, El Tri, Soda Stereo, Kenny y los electrónicos, among others. Her extensive career has been offering tours in countries like Peru, Ecuador, Colombia, Spain, Chile, among others.
