= Marcos Valdés =

Mexican actor and singer

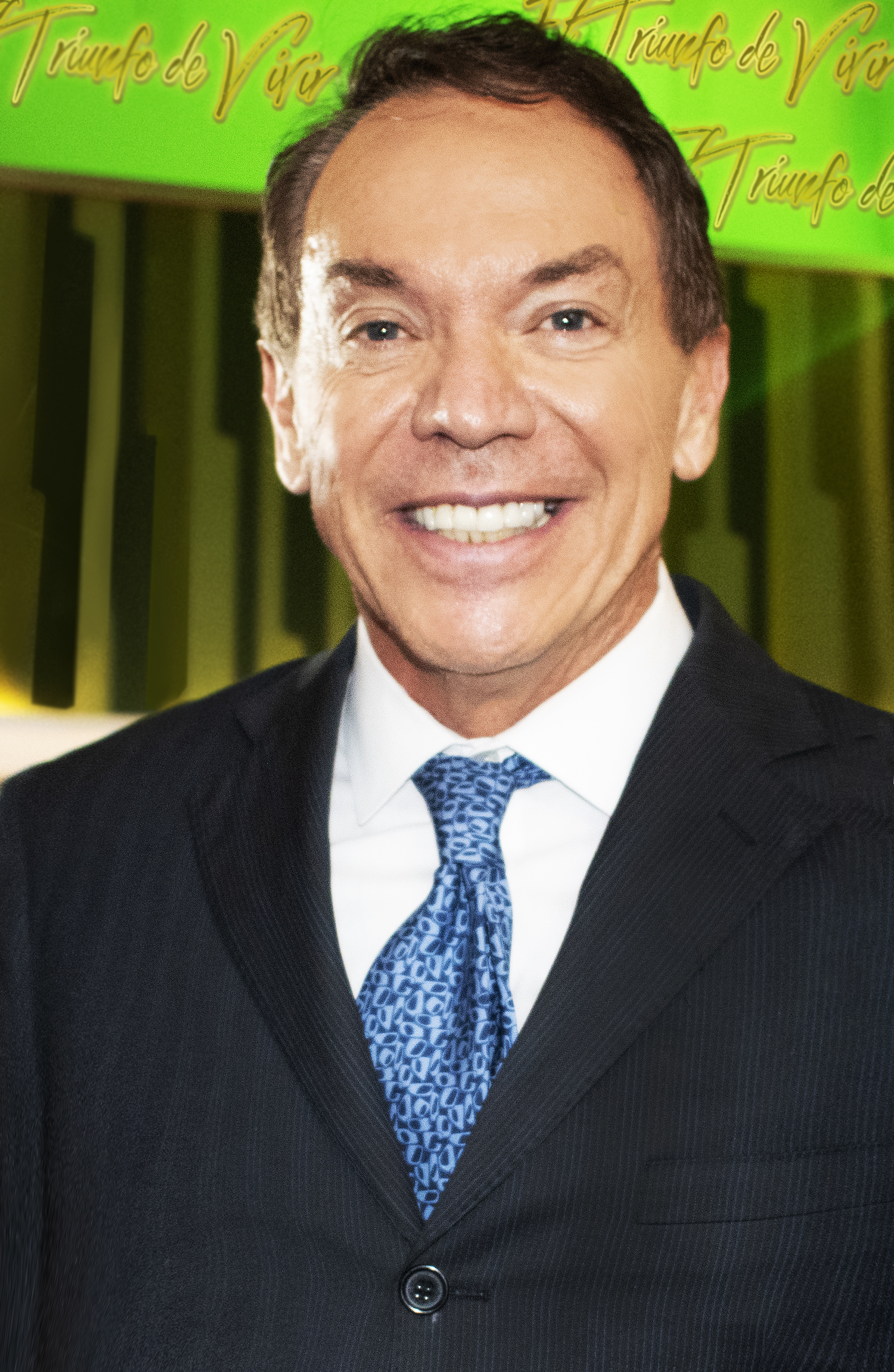
- Marcos Valdés in 2019.
- Born: Marcos Valdés Bojalil
- Citizenship: Mexican
- Education: CEA
- Occupations: Actor, Singer
- Organization: Televisa
- Known for: The Jungle Book 2
- Father: Manuel Valdés
- Relatives: Cristian Castro (half-brother)

Marcos Valdés Bojalil is a Mexican television actor and singer in Mexico. He is best known for his starring role in the series Ladrón de corazones.

He is the son of Manuel Valdés and half-brother of Cristian Castro.

== Movies ==
- Dr. Abel in The Triumph of Living By Glat Entertainment (2019)
- Philoctetes in Hercules By Disney (1997)
- Baloo in Jungle Book 2 By Disney (2003)
- Crazy Joe in Shark Tale By DreamWorks (2004)

== See also ==
- Valdés family
