= Jay de la Cueva =

Mexican musician (born 1978)

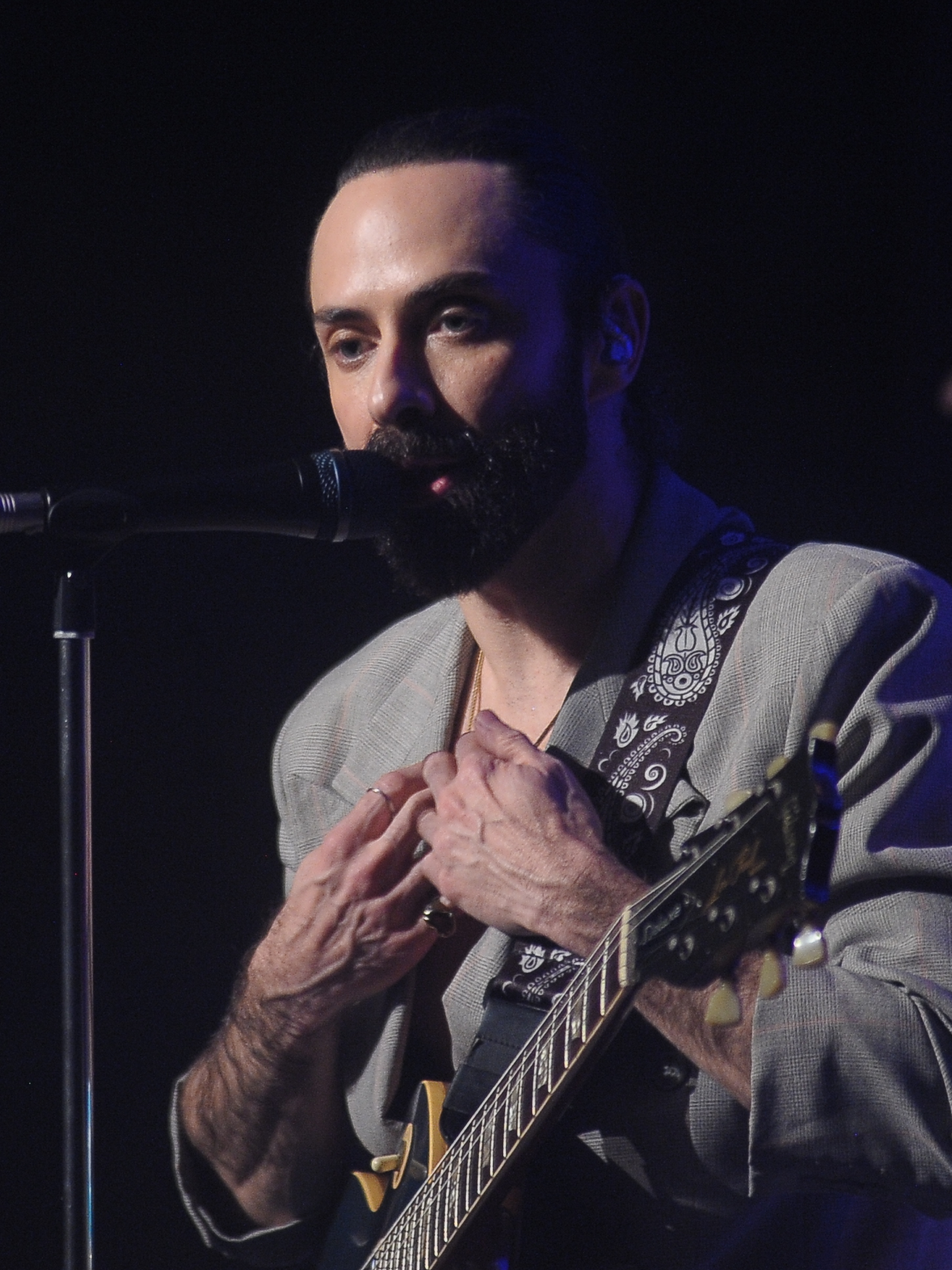
- de la Cueva at the Teatro de la Ciudad in November 2024

Background information
- Born: Javier Fernando de la Cueva Rosales; January 5, 1978 (age 48)
- Origin: Mexico City, Mexico
- Genres: Pop rock, glam rock, glam metal, alternative rock, electronica, pop metal, latin rock
- Occupations: Singer, record producer
- Instruments: Vocals, guitar, bass guitar, piano, drums

Javier Fernando de la Cueva Rosales (born January 5, 1978), known professionally as Jay de la Cueva, or Bryan Amadeus Moderatto, is a Mexican multi-instrumentalist musician, model and actor. He has participated in several bands throughout his career, including Micro Chips, Fobia, Molotov and Moderatto.

== Career ==
Jay de la Cueva's professional musical carrer began with the children's rock group Micro Chips, where he played bass. He later joined Victimas del Dr. Cerebro for about a year and a half, before joining Los Odio! and, later, founding Molotov with Micky Huidobro and Tito Fuentes. In 1995, Jay de la Cueva left Molotov to join the band Fobia.

In 1999, Jay de la Cueva joined the electronic band Titán. He is also a member of the supergroup Mexrrissey.

From 2001 to 2023, Jay de la Cueva, under the artistic persona Bryan Amadeus Moderatto, was the founding member and lead guitarist of Moderatto.

In 2024, Jay de la Cueva released his first solo album, the self-titled Jay de la Cueva.

== Bands ==
- Micro Chips – bass
- Victimas del Dr. Cerebro – drums
- Los Odio! – guitar
- Molotov – bass
- Titán – bass
- Fobia – drums, bass
- Moderatto – lead singer, guitar, piano
- Mexrrissey – guitar, bass, vocals
- Santo Ritual – bass, guitar, vocals
- The Guapos – guitar, vocals
