= Leonardo de Lozanne =

Mexican singer

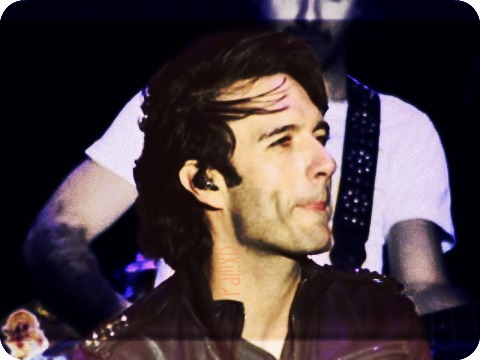
Leonardo de Lozanne

Leonardo de Lozanne is a Mexican model, fashion designer and singer-songwriter. He is the lead vocalist and frontman of the Mexican rock band Fobia. He was born in Mexico City on 19 December 1970. In 2014 he married actress Sandra Echeverria, with whom he has a son, but they divorced in 2022.

== Albums ==
- Turistas (2002)
- Series de Ficción (1999).
