= Perra =

Perra may refer to:

Spanish word for 'bitch' (female dog) but used more often as slang, see Spanish profanity.

Perra or perras may also refer to:

== People ==
- Athanasia Perra (born 1983), Greek triple jumper
- Clara Perra (1954–2015), Italian percussionist, pianist and composer

== Arts and media ==
=== Film ===
- La Perra, a 1967 Argentine film
- Perras, a 2011 Mexican film

=== Music ===
- "Perra", a J Balvin song

== See also ==
- Perras (surname)
