= R2D3 =

Brazilian pop Band

R2*D3
- Origin: Rio de Janeiro, Brazil
- Genres: Pop, teen pop
- Years active: 2009–2016
- Label: Universal Music
- Members: Douglas Teixeira; Davi Moraes; Roberta Mitidieri; Brendha Lú

R2D3 (stylized as R2*D3) was a Brazilian pop band formed in 2009, consisting of Brendha Lu, Davi Moraes, Roberta Mitidieri and Dodô Teixeira. The band was put together by Natália Subtil and produced by Güido Laris.

== History ==
The band was formed on April 4, 2009, by Natália Subtil with the mission to bring joy, fun and pop his followers. Later that year the band went to Mexico to record their first album, Nasci Pra Te Amar. The band was produced by Güido Laris, who also produced music for the bands RBD, OV7, Timbiriche and singer Belinda. The album contains tracks like "Talk Talk", "On My Way" and "Here". The band was featured on several Mexican TV shows and their music also gained airplay in the country.

== Members ==
Name	Data
Dodô Teixeira	January 21, 1990 (age 36)
Davi Morax	November 8, 1991 (age 34)
Roberta Mitidieri	February 3, 1992 (age 34)
Brendha Lú	May 20, 1993 (age 33)
Duanna	March 20, 1992 (age 34)
Rafa Ben	December 11, 1987 (age 38)
