= Arath de la Torre =

Mexican actor (born 1975)

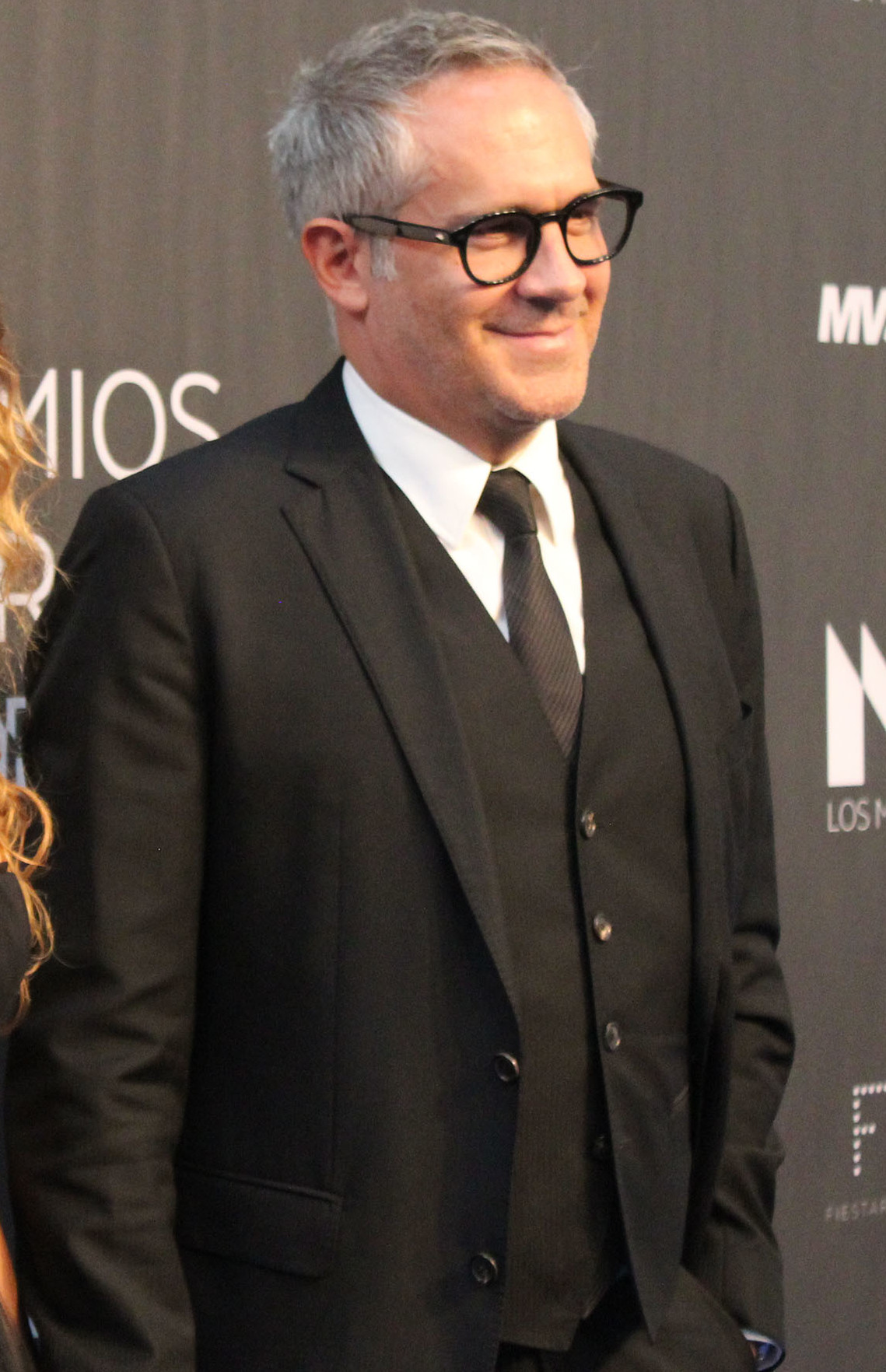
- De la Torre at the 2019 Metropolitan Theatre Awards
- Born: Arath De La Torre Balmaceda; March 20, 1975 (age 51); Cancún, Quintana Roo, Mexico
- Occupations: Actor, comedian
- Years active: 1994–present
- Spouse: Susy Lu (m. 2007)
- Children: 3
- Relatives: Ulises de la Torre (brother)

Arath De La Torre Balmaceda (born 20 March 1975) is a Mexican actor and comedian, best known for his roles in the telenovelas Soñadoras, Amigas y rivales, and Una familia con suerte.

== Career ==
At the age of 17, he moved from Cancún to Mexico City to study at the Centro de Educación Artística (CEA). In 1996, he made his acting debut in the telenovela Tú y yo, produced by Televisa, one of the main broadcasters in Mexico. In 2003, he began appearing in the sketch comedy show La parodia, followed by El Privilegio de Mandar in 2004. In 2007, he hosted the program La Hora de la Papa alongside Galilea Montijo.

In October 2020, de la Torre participated in the Mexican version of The Masked Singer, ¿Quién es la máscara? on the second season as "Xolo", and was eliminated on the fifth episode.

== Filmography ==
=== Film ===
Year	Title	Role	Notes
1999	La tregua	Esteban Santomé	
2000	Inspiración	Gabriel	
2004	Magos y Gigantes	Titán Caradura	Voice role
2008	Veritas, Prince of Truth	Danny	
2010	Plaza Sésamo: Los monstruos feos más bellos	Himself	
2011	El secreto del medallón de Jade	Derek	Voice role
2014	La dictadura perfecta	Speaker Poncho	
2016	Busco novio para mi mujer	Paco	
2018	Plan V	Professor Limón	
2019	Cómplices	Juan	
2021	The Puzzle Factory	Dr. Alejandro	
2022	Huevitos congelados	Barba Jan	Voice role
2022	Two Plus Two	Enrique	

=== Television ===
Year	Title	Role	Notes
1994	Agujetas de color de rosa	Customer	
1995	Caminos cruzados	Rubén	
1995	La Paloma	Paco	
1996	Tú y yo	Javier	
1996	Para toda la vida	Amadeo	
1997–1998	Salud, dinero y amor	Francisco José "Pancho" Martínez	
1997–1998	Mujer, Casos de la Vida Real	Various roles	Episodes "Guárdame el secreto"; "La despedida"
1998–1999	Soñadoras	Adalberto "Beto" Roque	
1998	Mi pequeña traviesa	Hugo #2	
1999	Cuento de Navidad	José / Bryan	
2001	Amigas y rivales	Roberto de la O	
2002–2007	La parodia	Various	9 episodes
2003–2004	Alegrijes y rebujos	Matías Sánchez	
2006	La fea más bella	Jaimito Conde	
2006	El privilegio de mandar	Various	Episode "Final"
2008–2009	Los simuladores	Emilio Vargas	Main role (seasons 1–2); 17 episodes
2010	Zacatillo, un lugar en tu corazón	Carretino Carretas / Gino Capuccino	Main cast; 130 episodes
2011–2012	Una familia con suerte	Francisco "Pancho" López	Main role; 266 episodes
2012–2013	Te presento a Valentín	Valentín	Main role (seasons 1–4); 77 episodes
2013	Porque el amor manda	Francisco "Pancho" López	3 episodes
2013	Cásate conmigo, mi amor	Marcelo Tablas	
2015–2016	Antes muerta que Lichita	Roberto Duarte	Main role; 131 episodes
2016	Hada Madrina	Presidente del Consejo de Magia	4 episodes
2017–2018	Caer en tentación	Andrés Becker	Main cast; 90 episodes
2018–2019	Simón dice	Simón Gutiérrez	Main role
2018–2019	Mi marido tiene familia	Francisco "Pancho" López	season 2
2019	El corazón nunca se equivoca	Francisco "Pancho" López	
2020	Relatos macabrones	Necio	
