= La Hora de la Papa =

Spanish language television program

La Hora de la Papa logo

La Hora de la Papa is a family-oriented entertainment program produced by Televisa and broadcast on Canal de Las Estrellas and Galavision. The show featured sketches, humor, videos and interviews with famous artists.

The show was hosted by Arath de la Torre and Galilea Montijo. La Hora de la Papa went off-air on October 5, 2007; the reasons are still unknown.

== Producers ==
The show's writers were Cesar Gonzales "El Pollo" and Manuel Rodiguez, both of whom previously worked on El Privilegio de Mandar and are current writers of La Hora Pico and La Parodia. Reynaldo López, producer of the previously mentioned TV shows, was in charge of the production.

== Plot ==
The show usually started with Claudio Herrera "El Hacker" segment called "Los Videos de La Web", showing online video content. It was first in this program when the video "La caida de Edgar" Edgar's fall was shown. Carlos Trejo was invited at least twice a week to talk about his paranormal investigations. They also invited many famous Mexican artists for interviews. Live music was also part of the show, bringing many music artists like RBD. Gustavo Murguía "Paul Yester" was the joker of the show, often telling black jokes and children jokes.

For some time, they held contests and games such as "El Rompecabezas" or the "puzzle" where two people had to answer questions and whoever had the right one had to choose a puzzle piece, and they had to guess who the artist was. "La Papa Caliente" was also a popular game, often played by famous artists like Liliana Arriaga "La Chupitos".

Galilea and Jackie Garcia had their own segments discussing health and beauty tips. Carlos Gallegos "El Inspector" often showed his investigations on corruption, crimes and other city problems.

Every day, they offered a variety of fresh material and during special events like Elvis Presley's birthday, every one on the show wore rock-n-roll costumes.

== Cancellation ==
A few days before the show was cancelled, Arath de la Torre announced that the show would be canceled for unknown reasons. Many people on the internet speculated that the show had low ratings. La Hora de la Papa was last aired on Friday, October 5, 2007. The show was replaced by La familia P. Luche in Mexico and Humor es Los Comediantes and Chiquitibum in the USA.
