= Gabriela Sánchez =

Gabriela Sánchez may refer to:

- Gabriela Sánchez (singer) (born 1987), contestant on the Mexican reality show Buscando a Timbiriche, La Nueva Banda
- Gabriela Sánchez (field hockey) (born 1962), retired field hockey player from Argentina
