= Timbiriche =

Mexican pop music group

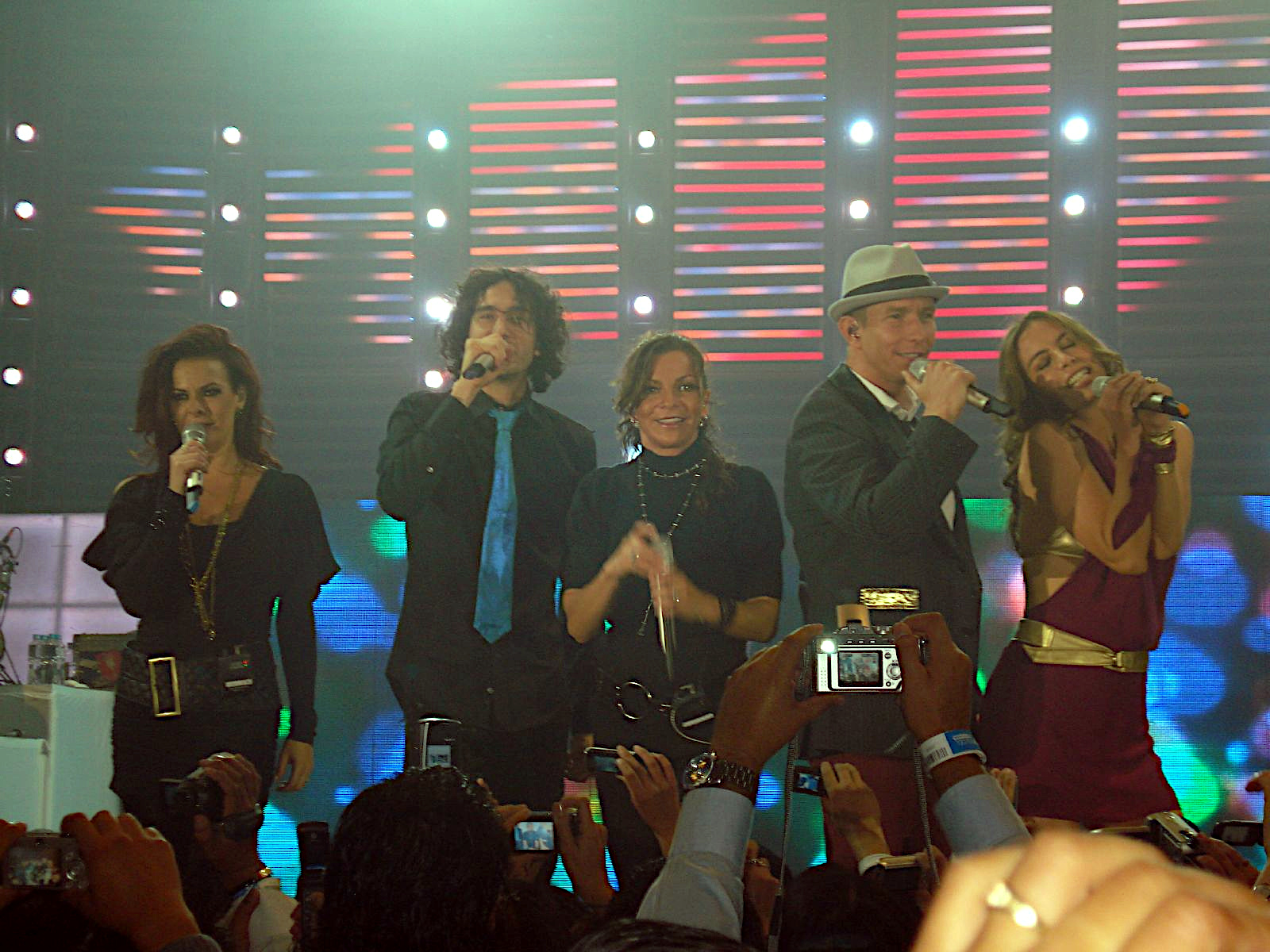
- Timbiriche in Fiesta Telcel 2007

Background information
- Also known as: La Banda Timbiriche
- Origin: Mexico City, Mexico
- Genres: Pop; synth-pop; Latin pop; teen pop; children's
- Years active: 1982-1994; 1998-1999; 2007-2008; 2017-2020
- Labels: Discos Melody; Fonovisa; EMI
- Past members: Thalía; Benny Ibarra; Sasha Sökol; Mariana Garza; Alix Bauer; Paulina Rubio; Diego Schoening; Erik Rubin; Eduardo Capetillo; Edith Márquez; Bibi Gaytán; Claudio Bermúdez; Patty Tanús; Silvia Campos; Lorena Shelley; Alexa Lozano; Daniel "Mano" Gaytán; Tanya Velasco; Kenya Hijuelos; Jean Duverger

Timbiriche (briefly known as La Banda Timbiriche) was a Mexican Latin pop group formed in 1981 as a children's music project, created in response to the Spanish group Parchís. Over time, the band transitioned into teen pop and later to a more mature pop sound. It is regarded as one of the most influential Latin pop groups of the 1980s and early 1990s.

The original lineup consisted of Benny Ibarra, Sasha Sokol, Diego Schoening, Alix Bauer, Paulina Rubio, and Mariana Garza. Other members joined the group during its lifetime, including Erik Rubín, Thalía, Eduardo Capetillo, Edith Márquez, and Bibi Gaytán, many of whom later established successful careers in music and entertainment in Mexico and Latin America. Their discography includes twelve studio albums released between 1981 and 1993, along with two compilation albums and three live recordings. The group reunited on three occasions: in 1998, in 2007 for its 25th anniversary, and in 2017 to celebrate its 35th anniversary.

== History ==
=== Name ===
Timbiriche (known in the United States as dots and boxes), is a paper-and-pencil game of mathematical structure. The objective of the game is to complete squares using points, and thus claim as many of these as possible on paper. The idea of naming the musical group comes in response to the Spanish children's musical group Parchís, whose name is also inspired by a table game.

=== Origin ===
The idea of forming the musical group goes back to the founding of the children's area of the Centro de Educación Artística (CEA) of the Mexican television network Televisa. The responsibility of recruiting a group of children for the ranks of the school was in charge of the Mexican actress and producer Martha Zavaleta. The children chosen to join the institution were Mariana Garza, Alix Bauer, Paulina Rubio and Diego Schoening. They were eventually joined by Benny Ibarra and Sasha Sokol. The group of children were trained in singing, dancing and acting in the institution. Eventually they staged a play. It was thanks to this work that the executives of Televisa had the idea of forming a children's musical group with the six children.

At that time, the Spanish musical group Parchís caused a sensation in Mexico and several countries of Spanish Speaking. Televisa formed Timbiriche as a Mexican response to Parchís. The creative team in charge of launching this group was formed by Victor Hugo O'Farril, former partner, producer and creative director of the television station, and by producer Luis de Llano Macedo. María Eugenia La Gorda Galindo, was selected as manager of the group.

=== Children's Band (1982-1984) ===
After a few months of preparation, Timbiriche made its official debut on 30 April 1982 on the Mexican television show Siempre en Domingo, featuring Spanish singer Miguel Bosé as its godfather. The group launches their first record production titled Timbiriche, which included the hit singles Amor para tí, Hoy tengo que decirte Papá, Y la fiesta comenzó and Somos amigos.

Due to the success obtained, and in order to have a wider repertoire in their presentations, the group recorded a second album titled La Banda Timbiriche, which included the hit singles La Banda Timbiriche, La vida es mejor cantando, México and Mamá . The group is also chosen to interpret the musical theme of the children's telenovela Chispita. In that same year, the group participates in a special of television where it shares scene with the group Parchís.

In 1983, the group released the album La Banda Timbiriche: En Concierto an album that was released under the concept of being a live album, although in fact the sound effects of the public were added in the recording studio. The album includes covers of songs in English and of musicals famous at that time like Time Warp of The Rocky Horror Picture Show, One Step (cover of Liza Minnelli and Goldie Hawn' song), Summer Nights (from the musical Grease) and Mickey (cover by Toni Basil). In this third album, the group already enjoyed a great acceptance in Mexico, receiving several disks of gold by the high sales of its albums.

At that moment of the group, the voices of the only two male members of the group were confused with those of the female members due to their young age. Because of this, the producers considered the idea of integrating a third male member into the group. The chosen one was Erik Rubín, who joins the band in December 1983. The band launches its fourth disc, titled Timbiriche Disco Ruido. The album was the first big challenge of the band, because it was not known what the public reaction would be to the new member, who had to go through many conflicts to adapt with his peers. However, the album had a good reception and contained hits such as Disco ruido and Adiós a la escuela.

=== Teen Band (1985-1987) ===
In 1984, Timbiriche, along with several other children actors and singers, starred in a version of the play Grease (called Vaselina in Mexico). The play was produced by the actress and producer Julissa. From this staging comes the album Timbiriche Vaselina, which was another success of the grouping. The album released the hit singles Amor primero (Those Magic Changes), Rayo Rebelde (Grease Lightnin'), Freddy mi amor (Freddy My love) and Iremos juntos (We Go Together).

For 1985, the group begins an evolution. They were no longer a children's group, and this situation leads to a new, fresher sound aimed at teenagers. This change is evident in the record Timbiriche Rock Show, released in 1985.

But in the middle of the success, Benny decides to leave the group in September of that same year, after the recording of the album and after to have participated only in the promotion of the first two singles. His reason was that he wanted to prepare in music by enrolling in a school in the United States. The singer chosen to replace him was Eduardo Capetillo, who already had become known for his stellar participation in the play Grease. Eduardo was the one who performed the rest of the album's promotion. From this production stand out songs like Teléfono (cover of Sheena Easton's song Telefone (Long Distance Love Affair)), Juntos, Soy un desastre, Corro, vuelo, me acelero, Me planto y Mi globo azul (cover of Nena' s song 99 Luftballons).

In August 1986 Sasha, another founding member, announced her departure from the group in order to become independent and launch herself as a solo singer. A month later, her place is occupied by Thalía, who had been announced a few years ago in a children's musical group called Din-Din, and also served as a substitute for Sasha in the Grease play.

In 1987, Timbiriche released the album Timbiriche VII. With this album, the group obtains a success superior to that of the previous disc, consolidating like one of the youthful groups leaders of Latin America and Spain. The album included hits like No seas tan cruel, Besos de ceniza, Mírame (Cuestión de tiempo), Si no es ahora, Con todos menos conmigo, Rompecabezas, Mágico amor and Ya estaba escrito.

In that same year, Timbiriche interprets the main theme of the telenovela Quinceañera, that was carried out by Thalía and the actress Adela Noriega.

In December of that same year, the group is invited to participate in the Christmas album Esta navidad, next to another artists. Timbiriche interprets the song ¡Ay del Chiquirritín!. In that same month, Mariana Garza, another of the founding members of the group, announces her departure from the group to enter as a television actress. It is Mariana herself who chooses for her replacement Edith Márquez, another young girl who was also part of Greases cast. In addition, Edith already was well-known for her participation in the TV sitcom Papá soltero. Edith lived a difficult process of adaptation when arriving at the group.

=== Adult Band (1988-1991) ===
The double album Timbiriche VIII & IX was released on 7 May 1988. The record was produced as a double album, as producers did not decide to choose the repertoire of songs that would include in the new album. At the time, the double discs were a novelty in Latin America and few artists were encouraged to produce them. The album (which was also released for sale separately) included the hit singles Tú y yo somos uno mismo, Ámame hasta con los dientes, Acelerar, Yo no se si es amor, Me estoy volviendo loca, Junto a tí, Máscaras, Pasos and Tú me vuelves loco. This period is considered as the zenith in the trajectory of the group and gives another step in its evolution, positioning itself as a young adult band.

In November 1988, Alix, another of the founders, decides to leave the group to prepare her solo career. After a series of auditions, in February 1989 her place is occupied by Bibi Gaytán, who ends next to the rest of the members the tour corresponding to the double album.

In February 1989 goes out for sale the first compilation album of the group titled Los Clásicos de Timbiriche. The album contains a compilation of the group's greatest hits, accompanied by the Symphony Orchestra of Mexico City, and was recorded in the Sala Netzahualcoyotl of Mexico City. The disc included an unpublished song, titled Por tí, and counted with the participation of Benny, Sasha and Mariana, the former members of the group. The production was recorded at the end of 1988, when Alix was still part of the group, but was released on sale until February 1989. That's why Bibi was not included in the album.

In July 1989, Eduardo Capetillo and Thalía also opt to leave the group to prepare their solo careers. After new auditions, their places are occupied by Claudio Bermúdez and Patty Tanús respectively.

The album Timbiriche X is considered by many as the last album that retains the original style of the band that, at the moment, already had only three of the original members: Paulina, Diego and Erik, besides Edith and Bibi, who were joined by Claudio and Patty. However, after only a few months, Patty is expelled from the group for having lied to producers regarding her age and marital status, being replaced by Silvia Campos, who although she did not record the album, if she toured and promoted it . The disc contained a strong influence of the dance music, that at that moment enjoyed enormous popularity in the dance floors of the world. The album included the successful singles Princesa Tibetana, Me pongo mal, Historia de amor, Yo no soy una más, Sacudete and Como te diré. With this record, Timbiriche receives his first Eres Award as Best Pop Group. In 1991, the group celebrates its 10th anniversary.

But at the end of the tour, Paulina, another of the founding members, leaves the group to open a career as a soloist. Just two weeks later, Erik, Edith and Bibi also announce their departure from the group to pursue a career as soloists. This situation leaves Diego as the only original member of the band, in addition to Claudio and Silvia.

=== The Second Generation (1991-1994) ===
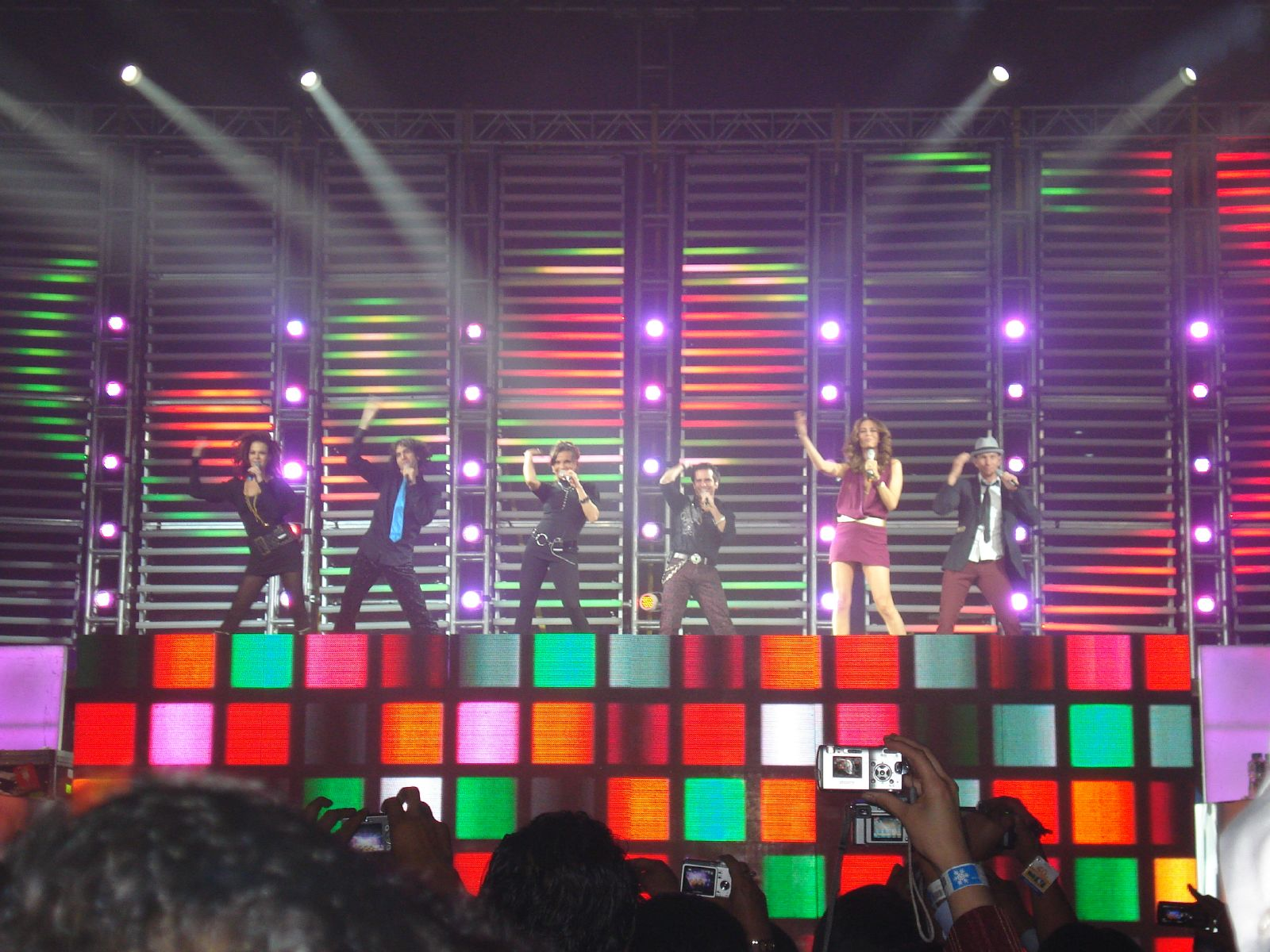
Timbiriche

Without the majority of its original members, the group was in decline, but the producers decided to continue with the concept and bet on launching a new generation. Surprisingly, in the midst of production, Claudio is fired from the group.

By the end of 1991, the band returns with five new members: Lorena Shelley, Daniel Gaytan, Tannya Velasco, Kenya Hijuelos and Alexa Lozano. Together with Diego and Silvia they record the album Timbiriche XI. In 1992, Kenya leaves the group before the official presentation of the disc by decision of the creators of the group by conflicts between the new members, being replaced by Jean Duverger. This second generation is officially presented during a broadcast of Siempre en domingo, in which all former members were invited to introduce the new members. This meeting was unique, since it had almost all the members of the group, being the only ones missing Diego, due to health problems and Thalía, who was working in Spain.

Despite retaining the name and concept in general, there was a new musical style that mixed dance and tropical rhythms. Although the album was not so popular with fans of the first generation, it began to appeal to younger generations, thanks to hits like Vanidosa, Sólo te quiero a tí, Tierra dorada, and Piel a piel, receiving disc of Gold and platinum by high sales. Thanks to this the group could survive another year.

For 1993 they record Timbiriche XII, disc of which it was detached like the last success of the group: Muriendo Lento (cover of Slowly original song of the ex-singer of the Swedish group ABBA, Anni-Frid Lyngstad). But at the beginning of 1994 Alexa decided to leave the group, announcing it in a concert in Monterrey to the fans without having said before to the managers and companions. This was one of the reasons that led to the final disintegration.

=== First Reunion (1998-1999) ===
In 1998, in the frame of the Festival Acapulco '98, the original six members reunited in the scene in a historical night that broke record of hearing. After the success obtained, it reissues the disc Los Clásicos de Timbiriche, now with the name of Timbiriche Symphonic that generated great stir among the followers.

Plans for a formal reunion crystallized in late November 1998, when the group performed a concert at the Auditorio Nacional of Mexico City. This concert also included Erik Rubín. For 1999, the group initiated a tour that was developed by all Mexico and part of Latin America. The reunion established in the Auditorio Nacional a record of hearing with more than 20 consecutive concerts. The tour would conclude with a massive concert at Foro Sol, also in Mexico City.

From that tour a double album titled Timbiriche, El concierto, was recorded that was recorded live in the Auditorio Nacional on 20 December 1998. This album also included three new songs: Esta Despierto, Suma Cósmica and La Fuerza del Amor.

=== 25th Anniversary Reunion (2007-2008) ===
The original members of the group (including Erik, and with the exception of Paulina Rubio, who can not participate for personal commitments), reunited in 2007 to celebrate the 25th anniversary of the band (30 April 2007). The celebration took place through a tour of concerts and three albums: one before the concerts, titled Timbiriche 25, with new versions of 12 classic songs of the group, a live album with some songs of the concert titled Somos Timbiriche 25 and finally the live album Timbiriche Vivo en Vivo (cd double + DVD) with the full version of the concert. The album also includes three unpublished songs: Vuelvo a Comenzar, Atado a tí and Domar el Aire. These themes are a gift and thanks to the fans who helped make Timbiriche's 25th anniversary a great success.

Timbiriche broke its record in the Auditorio Nacional with more than 20 consecutive performances with full masses and more than 30 concerts throughout Mexico. On Monday, 5 May 2008 Timbiriche closed the celebration of its 25 years at Foro Sol.

On 17 May 2008, the group participated at the Mexico City ALAS concert, benefitting poor children in Latin America. The group performed alongside singers like Miguel Bosé, Ricky Martin, Maná, and Chayanne, among others.

In addition, film director Carlos Marcovich who accompanied the group for much of the tour, announced the production of a documentary feature on Timbiriche, which was called La misma Piedra and premiered on Friday, 21 November 2008 in all Mexico cinemas.

=== The Reality Show ===
To celebrate the group's 25th anniversary, Televisa launched a great call for the formation of a new Band Timbiriche, this time formed by seven young people between 15–22 years old. The process was carried out through a reality show called Buscando a Timbiriche, La Nueva Banda. It was attended by 30 young people, and was endorsed by some of the original creators of the concept and other personalities of the show (Luis de Llano, Memo Méndez Guiú, Marco Flavio Cruz, Marta Zavaleta, Amparo Rubin and Kiko Campos). The six members of the project Timbiriche 25 (Diego, Erick, Sasha, Alix, Mariana and Benny) who participated as a jury evaluating the performance of the candidates. The band would be called The New Timbiriche Band.

Brissia, Fernanda, Gabriela, Taide, Alberto, Eduardo and Yurem, were chosen to form this new group. But the concept did not have the expected success. Only the single Tú, tú, tú achieve some acceptance of the public. The group disbanded in April 2009.

=== The Musical ===
In October 2007, producer Pedro Damián announced that he was planning to make a feature film based on Timbiriche's songs.

The script was written by Martha Carrillo and Cristina García (who wrote the script for the telenovela Tres Mujeres) which tells the story of adolescent love through the music of Sasha, Benny, Diego, Mariana, Álix, Érick, and Paulina.

About the project, Damián said, "It's like the play Hoy No Me Puedo Levantar (with music from Mecano) or like the Abba play Mamma Mia! — plays that used the music from the groups with different stories."

Carrillo told a Mexican newspaper that the plot deals with "the life of some kids who are trying to move forward with music, but not as a band; the main character is a composer, but she's not the one who sings."

The idea for a movie has been put on hiatus and the project has been initiated as a theatrical touring musical. The musical began auditions in January 2010 and is called Timbiriche: El Musical (Timbiriche: The Musical). The musical play is a love story that uses Timbiriche's songs as expressions but does not tell the story of the Timbiriche band.

=== 35th Anniversary Reunion (2017) ===
On 30 April 2017, Timbiriche celebrated its 35th anniversary. After several rumors and requests from fans through social networks, on 29 May 2017, Erik Rubin held a press conference where he announced the group's third reunion to commemorate its anniversary. As revealed by Rubin, this reunion started in September 2017 with an initial tour of 30 shows. The reunion tour featured the six original members of the band: Benny Ibarra, Sasha Sokol, Erik Rubin, Alix Bauer, Mariana Garza and Diego Schoening.

== Members ==
Original Members
Member	Years	First Members
Benny Ibarra	1982–1985	Original Member
Sasha Sokol	1982–1986	Original Member
Mariana Garza	1982–1987	Original Member
Alix Bauer	1982–1989	Original Member
Paulina Rubio	1982–1991	Original Member
Diego Schoening	1982–1994	Generation Member
Erik Rubín	1983–1991	Seventh Member
Replacements
Member	Years	Replaced
Eduardo Capetillo	1985–1989	Benny Ibarra
Thalía Sodi	1986–1989	Sasha Sokol
Edith Márquez	1988–1991	Mariana Garza
Patty Tanús	1989–1990	Thalía Sodi
Bibi Gaytán	1989–1991	Alix Bauer
Claudio Bermúdez	1989–1991	Eduardo Capetillo
Silvia Campos	1990–1994	Patty Tanúz
Tannya Velasco	1991–1994	Paulina Rubio
Daniel Gaytán	1991–1994	Erick Rubín
Lorena Shelley	1991–1994	Bibi Gaytán
Alexa Lozano	1991–1994	Claudio Bermudez
Kenya Hijuelos	1991-1992	Edith Márquez
Jean Duverger	1992–1994	Kenya Hijuelos
New Generation Band Members
Member	Years	Order of Entry
Brissia Mayagoitia	2007–2008; 2023–present	First Member
Fernanda Arozqueta	2007–2009; 2023–present	Second Member
Alberto Dogre	2007–2009 (did not rejoin when group reunited)	Third Member
Gabriela Sanchez	2007–2009; 2023–present	Fourth Member
Eduardo Brito	2007–2009; 2023–present	Fifth Member
Taide Rodriguez	2007–2009; 2023–present	Sixth Member
Yurem Rojas	2007–2009; 2023–present	Seventh Member

== Discography ==
=== Studio albums ===
Title	Album details	Certifications	Sales
Timbiriche	Released: 16 April 1982; Label: Fonovisa; Formats: LP		
La Banda Timbiriche	Released: 1982; Label: Fonovisa; Formats: LP, K7		
Timbiriche Disco Ruido	Released: 1983; Label: Fonovisa; Formats: LP, K7		
Timbiriche Vaselina	Released: 1984; Label: Fonovisa; Formats: LP		
Timbiriche Rock Show	Released: 1985; Label: Fonovisa; Formats: LP, K7	MEX: Gold	
Timbiriche VII	Released: 3 March 1987; Label: Fonovisa; Formats: LP, K7, CD		MEX: 1,000,000
Timbiriche VIII & IX	Released: 1988; Label: Fonovisa; Formats: LP, K7, CD	MEX: Platinum	MEX: 1,000,000
Timbiriche X	Released: 1989; Label: Fonovisa; Formats: LP, K7, CD	MEX: Platinum	MEX: 250,000
Timbiriche 11	Released: 1992; Label: Fonovisa; Formats: LP, K7, CD	MEX: Gold	
Timbiriche XII	Released: 1993; Label: Fonovisa; Formats: LP, K7, CD	MEX: Gold	

=== Live albums ===
Title	Album details	Peak chart positions		Certifications
Title	Album details	MEX	US Latin	Certifications
En Concierto	Released: 1983; Label: Discos y Cintas Melody; Formats: LP	—	—	
Timbiriche, El concierto	Released: 1999; Label: Fonovisa Records; Formats: CD	—	—	AMPROFON: Platinum + Gold
Somos Timbiriche 25 en Vivo	Released: 2007; Label: EMI; Formats: CD	21	—	AMPROFON: Gold
Vivo En Vivo	Released: 2008; Label: EMI; Formats: CD	3	—	AMPROFON: Gold
Timbiriche Juntos	Released: 2017; Label: EMI; Formats: CD+DVD	—	—	

=== Compilation albums ===
Title	Album details	Peak chart positions			Certifications
Title	Album details	MEX	US Latin	US Latin Pop	Certifications
Los Clásicos de Timbiriche	Released: 29 January 1989; Label: Discos y Cintas Melody; Formats: LP	—	—	—	
Timbiriche Symphonic	Released: 17 November 1998; Label: Universal Latino; Formats: CD	—	42	—	
25 Años	Released: 2007; Label: Fonovisa Records; Formats: CD	5	—	—	AMPROFON: Gold
Timbiriche 25	Released: 2007; Label: EMI; Formats: CD	1	24	8	AMPROFON: Platinum + Gold
Todo el reencuentro	Released: 2008; Label: EMI; Formats: CD	34	—	—	
La Historia	Released: 2011; Label: EMI; Formats: CD	89	—	—	
20 Super Temas: La Historia De Los Exitos	Released: 2011; Label: Universal Music; Formats: CD	—	—	16	

=== Singles ===
Year	Title	Peak chart positions		Album
Year	Title	US Hot Latin Songs	US Latin Pop Airplay	Album
1982	"Timbiriche"	—	—	Timbiriche
1982	"Hoy Tengo Que Decirte Papá"	—	—	Timbiriche
1982	"Amor Para Ti"	—	—	Timbiriche
1982	"Somos Amigos"	—	—	Timbiriche
1982	"Y La Fiesta Comenzo"	—	—	Timbiriche
1982	"El Gato Rocanrolero"	—	—	Timbiriche
1982	"La Banda Timbiriche"	—	—	La Banda Timbiriche
1982	"Chispita"	—	—	La Banda Timbiriche
1982	"La Vida Es Mejor Cantando"	—	—	La Banda Timbiriche
1982	"México"	—	—	La Banda Timbiriche
1982	"Mamá"	—	—	La Banda Timbiriche
1983	"Micky"	—	—	En Concierto
1983	"Problema"	—	—	En Concierto
1983	"Rock Del Manicomio"	—	—	Disco Ruido
1983	"Lo Pensé Muy Bien"	—	—	Disco Ruido
1983	"Disco Ruido"	—	—	Disco Ruido
1983	"Solo En Mi Cuarto"	—	—	Disco Ruido
1983	"Adiós A La Escuela"	—	—	Disco Ruido
1984	"Noches De Verano"	—	—	Timbiriche Vaselina
1984	"El Autocinema"	—	—	Timbiriche Vaselina
1984	"Sandra Dee"	—	—	Timbiriche Vaselina
1984	"Rayo Rebelde"	—	—	Timbiriche Vaselina
1984	"Amor Primero"	—	—	Timbiriche Vaselina
1984	"Cosas Peores"	—	—	Timbiriche Vaselina
1985	"Teléfono"	—	—	Timbiriche Rock Show
1985	"Juntos"	—	—	Timbiriche Rock Show
1985	"Soy Un Desastre"	—	—	Timbiriche Rock Show
1985	"Vivirás"	—	—	Timbiriche Rock Show
1985	"Corro, Vuelo, Me Acelero"	—	—	Timbiriche Rock Show
1986	"Ven, Ven, Ven"	—	—	Timbiriche Rock Show
1986	"Me Plantó"	—	—	Timbiriche Rock Show
1986	"Mi Globo Azul"	—	—	Timbiriche Rock Show
1986	"No Seas Tan Cruel"	—	—	Timbiriche VII
1987	"Besos De Ceniza"	45	—	Timbiriche VII
1987	"Mírame (Cuestión De Tiempo)"	—	—	Timbiriche VII
1987	"Si No Es Ahora"	—	—	Timbiriche VII
1987	"Con Todos Menos Conmigo"	—	—	Timbiriche VII
1987	"Mágico Amor"	—	—	Timbiriche VII
1988	"Rompecabezas"	—	—	Timbiriche VII
1988	"Ya Estaba Escrito"	—	—	Timbiriche VII
1988	"Quinceañera"	33	—	Quinceañera
1988	"Tu Y Yo Somos Uno Mismo"	—	—	Timbiriche VIII & IX
1988	"Ámame Hasta Con Los Dientes"	—	—	Timbiriche VIII & IX
1988	"Acelerar"	—	—	Timbiriche VIII & IX
1988	"No Se Si Es Amor"	—	—	Timbiriche VIII & IX
1988	"Me Estoy Volviendo Loca"	—	—	Timbiriche VIII & IX
1989	"Junto A Ti"	—	—	Timbiriche VIII & IX
1989	"Máscaras"	—	—	Timbiriche VIII & IX
1989	"Tu Me Vuelves Loco"	—	—	Timbiriche VIII & IX
1989	"Pasos"	—	—	Timbiriche VIII & IX
1989	"Basta Ya"	—	—	Timbiriche VIII & IX
1989	"Lo Quiero"	—	—	Timbiriche VIII & IX
1990	"Me Pongo Mal"	—	—	Timbiriche X
1990	"Princesa Tibetana"	—	—	Timbiriche X
1990	"Historia De Amor"	—	—	Timbiriche X
1990	"Yo No Soy Una Más"	—	—	Timbiriche X
1991	"Sacúdete"	—	—	Timbiriche X
1991	"Como Te Diré"	—	—	Timbiriche X
1992	"Vanidosa"	—	—	Timbiriche 11
1992	"Solo Te Quiero A Ti"	—	—	Timbiriche 11
1992	"Ay Amor... Amor"	—	—	Timbiriche 11
1992	"Tierra Dorada"	—	—	Timbiriche 11
1993	"Piel A Piel"	—	—	Timbiriche 11
1993	"Muriendo Lento"	—	—	Timbiriche XII
1993	"Volver A Comenzar"	—	—	Timbiriche XII
1993	"Cómplice"	—	—	Timbiriche XII
1994	"Como Pude Amarte"	—	—	Timbiriche XII
1994	"Mira Alrededor"	—	—	Timbiriche XII
1998	"Muriendo Lento"	—	—	En Concierto
2007	"Tú y Yo Somos Uno Mismo"	—	32	Timbiriche 25
2007	"Princesa Tibetana"	—	—	Timbiriche 25
2017	"El ciclo"	—	—	Timbiriche Juntos
"—" denotes the single failed to chart or was not released.

== Videography ==
=== Video albums ===
Year	Video details	Certifications	Details
1994	La Trayectoria: Release date: 1994; Studio: Fonovisa; Format: VHS		2 VHS release, with 60 minutes each one. The VHS 1 includes: El Amor Para Ti, El Gato Rockanrolero, Hoy Tengo Que Decirte Papa, Persecusion En La Ciudad, Somos Amigos, Disco Ruido, Me Planto, Juntos, Tu Y Yo Somos Uno Mismo, No, Amor Primero. VHS 2 includes: Besos De Ceniza, Corro, Vuelo Me Acelero, El Baile Del Sapo, Magico Amor, Mirame, No Seas Tan Cruel, Rompecabezas, Si No Es Ahora, Con Todos Menos Conmigo, Soy Un Desastre, Cocorito, Solo Tu, Solo Yo, 24.-Rococorocanroll, La Banda Timbiriche, Mexico, La Historia De... (documentary).
2004	Timbiriche Trayectoria Vol. I: Release date: 22 March 2004; Studio: Univision Music Group; Format: DVD	AMPROFON: Gold	A collection of Timbiriche's videos and live performances, it includes: "Timbiriche", "Hoy Tengo que Decirte Papa", "La Banda Timbiriche", "Chispita", "Payasos", "Noches de Verano", "El Baile del Sapo", "Micky (Mickey)", "Disco Ruido", "Rock del Manicomio", "Juntos", "Corro, Vuelo, me Acelero", "Soy un Desastre", "Mexico", "Quinceañera", "Soy un desastre" (Live).
2004	Timbiriche Trayectoria Vol. II: Release date: 22 March 2004; Studio: Univision Music Group; Format: DVD	AMPROFON: Gold	A collection of Timbiriche's videos and live performances, it includes: "Rompecabezas", "No Seas Tan Cruel", "Con Todos Menos Conmigo", "Mirame (Cuestion de Tiempo)", "Si No Es Ahora", "Besos de Ceniza", "Tu y Yo Somos Uno Mismo", "Amame Hasta Con Los Dientes" "No Se Si Es Amor", "Princesa Tibetana", "Vanidosa", "Piel a Piel", "Ay Amor", "Muriendo Lento", "Volver a Comenzar", "Mickey" (Live),
2004	El Concierto: Release date: 21 September 2004; Studio: Univison; Format: VHS, DVD	AMPROFON: Gold	Live concert released previously in double CD. It doesn't include all the songs from the live CD released. The concert: "Timbiriche", "Somos Amigos", "Princesa Tibetiana", "Si No Es Ahora", "Mama", "Mirame", "Soy Un Desastre", "Tu y Yo Somos Uno Mismo", "La Vida Es Mejor Cantando", "Hoy Tengo Que Decirte Papa", "Corro, Vuelo, Me Acelero". Plus: Esta Despierto (video), Interviews.
2008	25 Vivo En Vivo: Release 2008; Studio: EMI Music; Format: DVD		Live show recorded in 2007. Track listing: "Y La Fiesta Comenzó", "Somos Amigos", "La Banda Timbiriche", "Muriendo Lento"", Si No Es Ahora", "Soy Un Desastre", "Medley Vaselina", "Medley Rockero", "Sólo En Mi Cuarto" / "Solo Tú, Solo Yo", "Ojos De Miel" / "Amor Para Tí", "Mamá", "Junto A Ti", "Mírame (Cuestión De Tiempo)", "Besos De Ceniza", "Princesa Tibetana", "La Vida Es Mejor Cantando", "Tú Y Yo Somos Uno Mismo", "Corro, Vuelo, Me Acelero", "Con Todos Menos Conmigo", "Timbiriche", "Medley 80ero", "Juntos" / "Hoy Tengo Que Decirte Papá", "México".
2008	La Misma Piedra: Release 2008; Studio: EMI Music; Format: DVD		Documentary about the 25 Vivo En Vivo tour.
2017	Timbiriche Juntos: Release 2017; Studio: EMI Music; Format: DVD		Live show recorded in 2017.
