= Buscando a Timbiriche, La Nueva Banda =

- Starring: Galilea Montijo, Host. See Below for judges and contestants
- Country of origin: Mexico

Production
- Running time: 4 hours (Mexico), 3 hours (US)

Original release
- Network: Canal de las Estrellas
- Release: June 24 – October 14, 2007

Buscando a Timbiriche, La Nueva Banda was a Mexican reality show set to look for the new, re-make of the '80s and '90s Mexican band Timbiriche, hosted by Galilea Montijo. The show premiered on June 24, 2007, in Mexico on Canal de las Estrellas and on July 1, 2007 in the United States on Univision a week later from its original live air in Mexico. The show concluded on October 14, 2007, in Mexico, having Brisia, Fernanda, Alberto, Gaby, Eduardo, Taide, and Yurem as the seven new members of the brand new re-made band Timbiriche. Their first CD was released on November 30, 2007. The band announced their decision to split at their final concert in Nuevo Laredo in May 2009.

== Contestants ==
The red color on contestants signifies their expulsion from the show. The blue signifies the 7 winners of the show.

Place	Guys	Age, origin	Girls	Age, origin
1st	Alberto Dogre (3rd Mem.)	22, Mérida	Brissia Mayagoitia (1st Mem.) (quit band 3 months later to go solo)	16, Saltillo
1st	J. Eduardo Brito(5th Mem.)	18, Puebla	Fernanda Arozqueta (2nd Mem.)	19, Distrito Federal
1st	Yurem Rojas (7th Mem.)	17, Distrito Federal	Gabriela Sanchez (4th Mem.)	21, Guadalajara
1st	--	--	M. Taide Rodríguez (6th Mem.)	19, Guadalajara
2nd	--	--	Ana Sophía Sanchez	16, Hermosillo
2nd	Sergio Villa	21, Distrito Federal	Verónica	20, Colima
3rd	Fabián	20, Distrito Federal	--	--
4th	Gustavo	17, Villahermosa	--	--
5th	Diego	21, Mérida	Tamara	16, Monterrey
6th	David	21, Tamaulipas	Mariana	17, Puebla
7th	Alfonso	16, Tepic	Marcela	18, Monterrey
8th	Naín	21, Puebla	Daffne	17, Chihuahua
9th	Willie	21, Villa Úrsula Galván	Karla	17, Monterrey
10th	Jorge	22, Distrito Federal	Ingrid	18, Guadalajara
11th	Manuel	18, Distrito Federal	Cristy	19, Aguascalientes
12th	Alejandro	20, Guadalajara	Zelma	15, Distrito Federal
13th	Santiago	20, Puebla	María	16, Culiacán

== Format ==
=== Participants ===
30 participants (15 guys and 15 girls) ranging from ages 15–22 were chosen to enter the reality show and will live in "Escuela Timbiriche (Timbiriche School)".

=== Judging ===
Each week each will be scored on their singing and dancing performance by 3 tables of judges. The scores range from 1-10.

=== Honor Roll ===
From episodes 1-9, the 6 contestants (3 guys and 3 girls) that receive the highest GPA will be placed in the "Cuadro de Honor (Spanish for Honor Roll)". And the 2 that come in first will receive a special privilege for the week. Starting from episode 10, there will be only one scoreboard (for all contestants, guys and girls), and the top two will compete to be selected as a new member of the new band.

=== Reported ===
On the other hand, from episodes 1-9 the bottom 3 males and the bottom 3 females that receive the lowest GPA will be "Reportado (Reported)" and will be up for expulsion from the show.

Starting from episode 10 until the 14th, all contestants were reported. Since the 14th, no remaining contestant was eliminated, therefore no more reported students.

=== Expulsions ===
From episodes 1-9, on the day of the expulsions, two of the six Reported will be saved by the Timbiriche Council. The four still Reported will depend on the public vote, the two that receive the higher number of votes will be saved and the other two will be expelled. Starting from episode 10 until the 14th, the student at the bottom of the overall scoreboard (with the lower GPA and public votes) will be automatically expelled at the end of each episode.

=== Total number of members ===
The show was supposed to end with three guys and three girls as the new members of the newly re-made Timbiriche, but after much consideration of the show and the original members of the band, the newly formed band consists of seven members, with the final members being four girls and three guys.

=== Prize ===
The chosen members of the band will not only receive a record deal, but will go on tour throughout Mexico and starr in a telenovela (Mexican soap opera).

== Judges ==
=== Creators ===
These are the people that in their own ways helped create Timbiriche:

- Marco Flavio Cruz
- Martha Zavaleta
- Luis de Llano
- Amparo Rubín (who replaced Memo Méndez Guiú)

=== Consejo Timbiriche (Timbiriche Council) ===
These are the original members of Timbiriche (except Paulina Rubio) and each will have a vote.

- Benny Ibarra
- Alix Bauer
- Erik Rubín
- Sasha Sokol
- Diego Schoening
- Mariana Garza

=== Table of fans ===
This is made up of lifelong fans of the original band. They, as a group, cast one vote for each contestant.

== Results ==
These are the results that were announced at the end of each episode of Timbiriche.

Episode 1				Episode 2				Episode 3				Episode 4			
Girls	# of times	Guys	# of times	Girls	# of times	Guys	# of times	Girls	# of times	Guys	# of times	Girls	# of times	Guys	# of times
Brissia	1	Diego	1	Brissia	2	Eduardo	1	Brissia	3	Diego	2	Fernanda	3	Diego	3
Fernanda	1	Gustavo	1	Fernanda	2	Fabián	1	Sophia	2	Sergio	2	Marcela	1	Eduardo	2
Sophía	1	Sergio	1	Taide	1	Willie	1	Verónica	1	Yurem	1	Tamara	1	Jorge	1

Episode 5				Episode 6				Episode 7				Episode 8			
Girls	# of times	Guys	# of times	Girls	# of times	Guys	# of times	Girls	# of times	Guys	# of times	Girls	# of times	Guys	# of times
Brissia	4	Diego	4	Fernanda	4	Alberto	1	Brissia	5	Alberto	2	Gaby	3	Alberto	3
Gaby	1	Gustavo	2	Gaby	2	Eduardo	3	Fernanda	5	Eduardo	4	Fernanda	6	Fabián	3
Tamara	2	Naín	1	Taide	2	Fabian	2	Taide	3	Sergio	3	Taide	4	Sergio	4

Episode 9				Episode 10				Episode 11			
Girls	# of times	Guys	# of times	Girls	# of times	Guys	# of times	Girls	# of times	Guys	# of times
Fernanda	7	Alberto	4	Gaby**	5	Alberto**	5	Gaby**	6	Alberto**	6
Gaby	4	Fabián	4								
Sophía	3	Gustavo	3								

Episode 12				Episode 13				Episode 14				Episode 15			
Winner (First member)	# of times	Second candidate	# of times	Winner (Second member)	# of times	Second candidate	# of times	Winner (Third member)	# of times	Second candidate	# of times	Winner (Fourth member)	# of times	Second candidate	# of times
BRISSA	6	Sophia	4	FERNANDA	8	Yurem	2	ALBERTO	6	YUREM	3	GABY	7	Taide	5

Episode 16 (Test 1)				Episode 16 (Test 2)				Episode 16 (Test 3)			
Winner (Fifth member)	# of times	Second candidate	# of times	Winner (Sixth member)	# of times	Second candidate	# of times	Winner (Seventh member)	# of times	Second candidate	# of times
EDUARDO	5	Yurem	4	TADIE	6	Sophia	5	Yurem	5	Verónica, Sergio, Sophia	6 / 2 / 5

- Ep 10 - This was the first episode to have two (Alberto and Gaby) in the honor roll, due to changed rules. Gaby, Brissia and Sophia were tied in points (8,8), but Gaby got the lead due to decimals (8,875)
- Ep 11 - There was no honor roll in this episode. The contestants had limited appearance in spite of 'Copa Timbiriche VIP'.
- Ep 12 - As of this episode, the considered honor roll are the two people with the highest points and that will face off to become a member.

== Reported ==
The reported are announced at the end of each show, while the expulsions are held the following week. The Timbiriche Council saves two contestants first, then the public vote results are revealed toward the end of the show and announce who stays and who is expelled.

Episode 1				Episode 2				Episode 3				Episode 4			
Girl	# of times	Guy	# of times	Girl	# of times	Guy	# of times	Girl	# of times	Guy	# of times	Girl	# of times	Guy	# of times
Ingrid	1	David	1	Cristy	1	Alejandro	1	Cristy	2	David	2	Ingrid	2	Alfonso	1
Karla	1	Santiago	1	Marcela	1	Manuel	1	Gaby	1	Eduardo	1	Mariana	1	David	3
María	1	Yurem	1	Zelma	1	Yurem	2	Marcela	2	Manuel	2	Taide	1	Yurem	3

Episode 5				Episode 6				Episode 7				Episode 8			
Girl	# of times	Guy	# of times	Girl	# of times	Guy	# of times	Girl	# of times	Guy	# of times	Girl	# of times	Guy	# of times
Karla	2	Alfonso	2	Daffne	1	Naín	1	Marcela	3	Alfonso	3	Mariana	4	David	5
Sophia	1	Willie	1	Mariana	2	Sergio	1	Mariana	3	David	4	Sophia	2	Gustavo	1
Taide	2	Yurem	4	Verónica	1	Yurem	5	Tamara	1	Diego	1	Verónica	2	Yurem	6

- Ep 6 - David was put up for expulsion the night of the results due to behavior issues towards Mariana, a current contestant, not to mention Mariana felt he had touched her indecently.

Episode 9				Episode 10				Episode 11			
Girl	# of times	Guy	# of times	Girl	# of times	Guy	# of times	Girl	# of times	Guy	# of times
Taide	3	Diego	2	Brissia	1	Alberto	1	Brissia	2	Alberto	2
Tamara	2	Eduardo	2	Fernanda	1	Eduardo	3	Fernanda	2	Eduardo	4
Verónica	3	Yurem	7	Gaby	2	Fabian	1	Gaby	3	Fabian	2
				Sophia	3	Gustavo	2	Sophia	4	Gustavo	3
				Taide	4	Sergio	2	Taide	5	Sergio	3
				Veronica	4	Yurem	8	Veronica	5	Yurem	9

- Ep 11 - There were no expulsions on this episode

Episode 12				Episode 13			
Girl	# of times	Guy	# of times	Girl	# of times	Guy	# of times
Fernanda	3	Alberto	3	Gaby	5	Alberto	4
Gaby	4	Eduardo	5	Sophia	6	Eduardo	6
Sophia	5	Fabian	3	Taide	7	Sergio	5
Taide	6	Sergio	4	Veronica	6	Yurem	10
Veronica	7	Yurem	11				

== Results ==
Episode 1	Episode 2			Episode 3			Episode 4		
	Saved by	Girls	Guys	Saved by	Girls	Guys	Saved by	Girls	Guys
	Timbiriche Council	Ingrid	David	Timbiriche Council	Cristy	Manuel	Timbiriche Council	Marcela	Eduardo
	Public	Karla	Yurem	Public	Marcela	Yurem	Public	Gaby	David
	Expelled	María	Santiago	Expelled	Zelma	Alejandro	Expelled	Cristy	Manuel

Episode 5			Episode 6			Episode 7			Episode 8		
Saved by	Girls	Guys	Saved by	Girls	Guys	Saved by	Girls	Guys	Saved by	Girls	Guys
Timbiriche Council	Taide	David	Timbiriche Council	Sophia	Alfonso	Timbiriche Council	Mariana	Sergio	Timbiriche Council	Tamara	Diego
Public	Mariana	Alfonso, Yurem	Public	Taide	Yurem	Public	Verónica	Yurem, David**	Public	Mariana	David
Expelled	Ingrid	Jorge**	Expelled	Karla	Willie	Expelled	Daffne	Naín	Expelled	Marcela	Alfonso

- Ep 5 - Jorge was put up for expulsion after an incident that happened and was his second warning, therefore putting him up for expulsion the night of the results.

Episode 9			Episode 10			Episode 11			Episode 12		
Saved by	Girls	Guys	Saved by	Girls	Guys	Saved by	Girls	Guys	Saved by	Girls	Guys
Timbiriche Council	Verónica	Gustavo	Timbiriche Council	Taide	Eduardo				All	Fernanda	Alberto
Public	Sophía	Yurem	Public	Veronica	Yurem				All	Gaby	Eduardo
									All	Sophia	Fabian
									All	Taide	Sergio
									All	Veronica	Yurem
Expelled	Mariana	David	Expelled	Tamara	Diego				Expelled	--	Gustavo

Episode 13			Episode 14		
Saved by	Girls	Guys	Saved by	Girls	Guys
All	Gaby	Alberto	All	Gaby	Eduardo
All	Sophia	Eduardo	All	Sophia	Sergio
All	Taide	Sergio	All	Taide	Yurem
All	Veronica	Yurem	All	Veronica	
Expelled	--	Fabián	Expelled	--	--

• Ep 14 - * From this episode on, there will be no more expulsions.

=== Episode 16 ===
==== Results ====
- This episode featured the competition for the last 3 spots in the band, with 6 contestants remaining, the three that do not make the band are automatically eliminated.

Status	Contestant
Member	Eduardo
Member	Taide
Member	Yurem

Eliminated	Sophia	Eliminated	Sergio	Eliminated	Verónica
