= Fernando Reina Iglesias =

Mexican businessman and water skier

Fernando Reina Iglesias (Acapulco, Guerrero; March 6, 1978) is a Mexican athlete, businessman and politician.

== Biography ==
Fernando Reina studied marketing at the Monterrey Institute of Technology and Higher Education. He also pursued postgraduate studies at the Universidad Internacional de Cuernavaca, and obtained a master's degree in international business administration at the Universidad Internacional (Uninter) and a master's degree in public policy management (ITESM).

On August 6, 2011, he married Mexican actress and host Galilea Montijo in the port of Acapulco, Guerrero. The civil ceremony was presided over by the judge and mayor of the city, Manuel Añorve Baños.

== Water skiing competitions ==
On March 7, 2011, Fernando Reina Iglesias broke the world record in barefoot water skiing, this record was 22 years old and belonged to the American skier Scott Pellaton.
