= Fernanda Arozqueta =

- Born: María Fernanda Arozqueta Chahin; January 16, 1989 (age 37); Mexico City, Mexico
- Origin: Mexico City, Mexico
- Occupations: Singer, actress, TV hostess
- Instruments: vocals, piano
- Years active: 2007–present
- Label: EMI Televisa

María Fernanda Arozqueta Chahin (born 16 January 1989 in Mexico City, Mexico), known professionally as Fernanda Arozqueta is a Mexican singer, psychologist, actress and member of the Mexican pop group, "La Nueva Banda Timbiriche".

== Early life ==
Fernanda Arozqueta was born and raised in Mexico City. She is the oldest of 3 sisters. Her parents divorced during her childhood. She started singing as a child and participated in dance competitions for ballet, flamenco, and modern dance. She is of Syrian descent on her father's side and Lebanese descent on her mother's side. Her paternal grandparents settled in Mexico after arriving from Syria. Her maternal grandmother sailed to Mexico from Lebanon at age 14.

== Music career ==
=== La Nueva Banda Timbiriche (2007–2009) and relaunch (2023-present) ===
When she was 18 years old, she began her music career as a contestant on the Mexican reality television program, Buscando a Timbiriche, La Nueva Banda in 2007. Televisa held auditions throughout Mexico to find members for an updated line-up of the iconic singing group, Timbiriche. The show premiered on Canal de las Estrellas on June 24, 2007. Arozqueta was one of 30 finalists chosen from across Mexico. The competition aired live each week in Mexico and concluded after four months. The contestants trained with vocal coaches and dance teachers while living together in a house. She earned a place in the group's lineup along with six other contestants.

Arozqueta was one of the lead vocalists in "La Nueva Banda Timbriche". The band released their first single, Tú, Tú, Tú on October 25, 2007. The single landed in the top 10 radio charts in Mexico. Their debut self-titled album was released on November 25, 2007, in Mexico. It was released on February 12, 2009, in the U.S. The album debuted at number 49 on the top Mexican album charts and eventually peaked at #18. In February 2008, the album was certified gold in Mexico for more than 50,000 sales. The group toured extensively throughout Mexico and Latin America in 2008 and 2009. They were the opening act at 20 shows for the US leg of RBD's Empezar desde Cero tour in 2008. In 2008, their third single, Solo Tú, was chosen as the theme song for the Mexican telenovela, Cuidado con el ángel, starring Maite Perroni and William Levy. The band filmed a special appearance on an episode of the popular telenovela, En Nombre Del Amor in 2008. Production on their sophomore album began in early 2009, but it was never released. In June 2009, the group announced their separation at a concert in Nuevo Laredo, Mexico due to some of the members' separate projects outside of the band.

In 2023, she rejoined La Nueva Banda Timbiriche and embarked on a multi-city tour of Mexico for the El Pop 2000's tour. The tour included popular telenovela actors and performers who first gained notoriety in Mexico in the 2000s. The tour's initial success led to a second leg of shows in Mexico for 2024. The tour was the first time she had performed in over a decade with the band.

=== Fridas (2011–2014) ===
In 2011, Arozqeuta formed Fridas, an electro-pop singing duo with her friend and fellow Centro de Educación Artística classmate, Denisse Gares Aragón. The duo performed at various showcases and clubs in Mexico City in late 2011 to early 2012. They started recording their debut album in 2012. Their first and only single, Pruébame was released on November 5, 2012, for iTunes in Mexico. A music video was filmed in November 2012 and premiered exclusively on Telehit in December 2012. To promote the single, they performed at radio festivals and México Suena, a televised concert, featuring popular Mexican performers in 2013. They performed an acoustic set featuring songs from their debut album for fans on Lunadas, a music program for Televisa on March 6, 2013. Their music was also featured on the television shows, Como dice el dicho and Gossip Girl: Acapulco. Their untitled debut album was recorded in Mexico City and completed in November 2012. It consisted of songs composed by Arozqueta, Aragón, and some of their producers. The proposed album was to include 10 Spanish songs and 1 English-language cover of "Pruébame". An album title nor release date was never given and the album was never released commercially. The album later leaked online in its entirely. Gares later formed another singing duo without Arozqueta and appeared as a contestant on the music reality competition, La Voz... México in late 2014. The duo split up for unknown reasons in 2014.

== Acting career ==
=== Early career ===
Following La Nueva Banda Timbiriche's disbandment in June 2009, Arozqueta was accepted into Centro de Educación Artística, the acting school run by media giant, Televisa, in Mexico City. For three years, she studied voice, acting, and dance and performed in various school plays. She graduated from CEA in 2011. During her time at CEA, she acted in small roles on television programs such as Esperanza del corazón and Cachito de Cielo from 2010 to 2011. In 2013, she auditioned for and earned a spot as one of four co-hosts on "P.M.", a late night pop-cultured oriented television show produced by Televisa. The show targeted a young adult audience using various social media platforms. The program premiered on Canal 5 on September 2, 2013. It aired weeknights from 9 p.m. to 12 a.m. in Mexico.

=== 2014 to 2016 ===
In February 2014, she auditioned for a recurring role in El color de la pasión, Televisa's newest telenovela. In March, she was confirmed as a cast member, playing the younger version of one of telenovela's main characters, "Brígida". The telenovela premiered on Canal de las Estrellas on March 17, 2014. She also appeared in the second and third seasons of the musical, Vaselina (Grease in English) from January to July 2014, replacing actress Geraldine Galván, who played "Chiquis" in the play's first season. The play toured multiple cities in Mexico including Guadalajara and Puebla. Its third season ended in July 2014.

In early July 2014, she began filming Hostel D.F., an exclusive web mini-series produced jointly in Mexico and with the Colombian production company, "Mimosa TV". The series filmed in Mexico City. Its first episode premiered on August 3, 2014, on "Mimosatv.com". In late March 2015, she was confirmed as a cast member for the telenovela, Amor de barrio, and portrayed "Dora Luz" on the program. She also joined the cast of ¡Sábados de foro! where she served as a co-hostess on the news-related program for FORO TV in Mexico.

In January 2016, she began filming the television drama, Yago, in Mexico City. The series premiered on May 2, 2016, on Univision in the U.S. She appeared in several episodes of the telenovela series, Como dice el dicho, from 2011 to 2018, playing various roles. In 2021, she appeared in the television drama series, Esta historia me siena.

=== 2024 to present ===
Following the conclusion of the tour for La nueva banda, Arozqueta revealed on her Instagram account that she had begun filming a new television series. The show called Regalo de amor was filmed in 2024 and is scheduled to premiere in Mexico on Televisa in 2025. Arozqueta plays a character named Elena in the series.

== Personal life ==
In a 2022 interview, she revealed that realized she was gay at age 14 and was supported by her immediate family when she came out. She has publicly stated that she does not want to have children. She was raised in a traditional Catholic household. During breaks in her acting career, she opened a marketing agency and worked with various Mexican companies due to her interest in psychology. She resides in Mexico City, where she works as a psychologist at Doctor Fauch, a holistic, online psychology company she founded. Her specialty includes clinical psychology training with an approach to cognitive behavioral therapy. She studied psychology at Universidad del Valle de México.

== Filmography ==
Television
Year	Title	Role	Notes
2007	Buscando a Timbiriche, La Nueva Banda	Contestant	Reality show (Winner/Joined group)
2008	En nombre del amor	Herself	Musical guest with La Nueva Banda Timbiriche
2011–2018	Como dice el dicho	Julieta / Vanessa	"Nada mejor en la vida" (Season 1, Episode 37) "El que esté libre de culpa" (Season 2, Episode 7) "A grandes males" (Season 3, Episode 1)
2011–2012	Esperanza del corazón	Alejandra	Telenovela
2012	La rosa de Guadalupe		Episode: "Una segunda oportunidad de amar"
2012	Miss XV	Doris Gascón	Television series
2013–14	P.M.	Co-host	News/entertainment show
2014	Hostal D.F.	Re	Web series
2014	El color de la pasión	Brígida de Zuñiga (young)	Telenovela (Episodes 1–5)
2015	¡Sábados de foro!	Co-host	Morning news program
2015	Amor de barrio	Dora Luz Márquez Lopezreina / Dora Luz Cruz Lopezreina	Telenovela
2016	Yago	Alejandra	Television series
2019	La Bandida	Valentina (joven)	Television series (14 episodes)
2021	Esta historia me suena	Melina	Television series (1 episode)
2025	Regalo de amor	Elena	Telenovela

=== Theatre ===
Year	Production	Role
2014	Vaselina	Chiquais (Seasons 2 & 3)
2014	En brazos de otra	

== Discography ==
=== Studio Album ===
With "La Nueva Banda Timbiriche"

Year	Album details	Peak chart positions	
Year	Album details	MEX	US
2007	La Nueva Banda Timbiriche: Released: November 25, 2007 (Mexico); Released: February 12, 2008 (United States); Label: EMI Televisa; Formats: Physical and digital	18	—
"—" denotes releases that did not chart or not released to that country

=== Singles ===
"With "La Nueva Banda Timbiriche"

Year	Single
2007	"Tú, tú, tú
2008	"Aunque digas"
2008	"Solo tú"

With "Fridas"

Year	Single	Notes
2012	"Pruébame"	Single from unreleased album

=== Music video appearances ===
Year	Song	Band
2008	"Tú, tú, tú	La Nueva Banda Timbiriche
2012	"Pruébame	Fridas
