= Te presento a Valentín =

- Genre: Telenovela comedy
- Starring: Arath de la Torre; Marisol Gonzalez; Carlos de la Mota; Tania Vazquez; Marcelo Cordoba
- Theme music composer: Natalia Jimenez
- Opening theme: Yo solo puedo (Only I Can)
- Country of origin: Mexico
- Original language: Spanish
- No. of episodes: 15 (Season 1); 20 (Season 2)

Production
- Producer: Ignacio Ortiz
- Running time: 8–9 minutes

Original release
- Network: El Canal de las Estrellas
- Release: October 29, 2012 – June 2013

Te Presento a Valentín (international title: This Is Valentin) is a Mexican soap opera produced by Ignacio Ortiz for Televisa.

== Plot ==
Valentin is a fun, hardworking, passionate man who dreams of becoming editor of a magazine. He wishes to be able to find true love and form a family, but has yet to find the right woman.

What he doesn't know is that his life is about to change when, through fate, he meets Monserrat, a beautiful and noble woman who runs a charity called Fundación Aplícate.

Valentin and Monserrat are immediately attracted to one another and everything seems to be going smoothly until, in an act of desperation, Valentin creates an imaginary twin brother named Leo.

This white lie gets out of control, when Monserrat's sister, Karen, falls for Leo and is determined to fight for her love.

Although Valentin wishes to admit the truth, his kind spirit, economic pressures, and endless problems make this impossible. In an effort to help Piojito, the grandson of the caretaker of the building, Valentin is forced to continue his lie.

However, Valentin knows that his love for Monserrat is true, and he puts his best effort into their relationship with the constant support of his best friend, Manuel, a handsome, honest graphic designer. Valentin continues to fight for his love, even when this causes problems with Bruno, the finance manager at Fundación Aplícate, who is also in love with Monserrat.

Between constant bathroom trips, short breaks and several misunderstandings, Valentin still manages to pull off his double life as Leo. But as time passes, his need to tell the truth grows as the identity of Leo begins jeopardizing what he most desires: to live a happy life with Monserrat at his side.

== Cast ==
Actor/Actress	Character	Season	
Actor/Actress	Character	1	2
Arath de la Torre	Valentin/Leo	Main character	Main character
Marisol González	Monserrat	Main character	Main character
Carlos de la Mota	Manuel Díaz	Main character	Main character
Tania Vazquez	Karen	Main character	Main character
Marcelo Cordoba	Bruno	Antagonist	Antagonist
Ingrid Martz	Liliana	Antagonist	Antagonist
Eugenio Cobo	Editor	Secondary character	Secondary character
Tania Lizardo	America	Antagonist	Antagonist
