= Gerardo Flores (footballer) =

Mexican footballer (born 1986)

Personal information
- Full name: Gerardo Flores Zúñiga
- Date of birth: 5 February 1986 (age 40)
- Place of birth: Xochitepec, Morelos, Mexico
- Height: 1.80 m (5 ft 11 in)
- Position: Right-back

Youth career
- 2003–2004: Zacatepec

Senior career*
Years	Team	Apps	(Gls)
2004	Zacatepec	0	(0)
2004	Celaya (loan)	1	(0)
2005–2007	Monterrey 1 "A"	45	(4)
2007	Monterrey	6	(0)
2007–2008	Académicos	11	(2)
2007–2011	Atlas	59	(2)
2009	→ Jaguares de Tapachula (loan)	1	(0)
2009–2010	→ Chiapas (loan)	38	(0)
2011–2019	Cruz Azul	128	(10)
2016	→ Toluca (loan)	25	(1)
Total		314	(15)

International career
2003	Mexico U17	4	(1)
2013–2016	Mexico	15	(0)
- * Club domestic league appearances and goals

Gerardo Flores Zúñiga (born 5 February 1986) is a Mexican former professional footballer who played as a right-back.

== Personal life ==
Flores is married to Mexican singer, professional sports trainer, and model, Gaby Sanchez, who is a member of the Mexican pop group, La Nueva Banda Timbirirche. The couple met in 2015, announced their engagement after six months of dating, and later married in a civil ceremony in early 2016. They live in Guadalajara, Mexico.

== Club career ==
=== Zacatepec ===
Flores began his football career with cross town club Zacatepec FC in Morelos, Mexico. During his stay at Zacatepec, he would be called to the Mexican squad that would participate in the 2003 FIFA U-17 World Championship held in Finland by coach Julio Grondona.

Flores played only one match with Zacatepec, in a quarter final game of the Clausura 2004 season versus Club Leon.

=== Cajeteros de Celaya ===
Flores played a single match for Cajeteros de Celaya in the Primera A's Apertura 2004 season.

=== Monterrey ===
Flores came to CF Monterrey in 2005. He began playing with Monterrey's B team in the Primera A, but eventually rose to the first team. During the Clausura 2007 season Gerardo Flores made his professional debut for CF Monterrey under Coach Miguel Herrera, on February 17, 2007, in a 2–2 draw against Necaxa, Flores started and played the entire match. After one season with Monterrey Flores was Transferred to Atlas for the Apertura 2007 season.

=== Atlas ===
Being transferred to Atlas, Flores got to play in the 2008 Copa Libertadores. He also played for Académicos, Atlas' B team in Primera A. He was loaned for two years to Jaguares. When he returned from Chiapas, he would play two more seasons with Atlas before signing with Cruz Azul in 2011 .

=== Jaguares ===
Flores was loaned to Jaguares, where he would stay on loan for 2 years. During his stay, he and his teammates helped Jaguares reach the quarter final of the Clausura 2009 playoffs, losing to Pachuca.

=== Cruz Azul ===
He was transferred in June 2011 to Cruz Azul. During his time in Cruz Azul he won the Copa MX twice, as well as the CONCACAF Champions League once in 2013 and 2014 respectively. He also made three appearances in the 2014 FIFA Club World Cup losing to Real Madrid in the semifinals and losing for third place against New Zealand team Auckland City FC. He was also given the chance to play in the 2015 Copa America with Mexico but it was cut short as they failed to advance from the group stages. In the Apertura 2018 Liga MX Final vs Club America in the 87th minute he received a red card as a substitute when he grabbed a ball and pushed a player from Club America.

=== Toluca ===
On December 16, 2015, it was made official that Flores would be joining Deportivo Toluca in a season-long loan deal from Cruz Azul. On January 6, Flores made his debut with Toluca against Tigres de la UANL, he played 75 minutes and the team won with a single goal from Colombian striker Fernando Uribe in stoppage time.

On 23 February 2021, Flores announced his retirement from professional football. After not being in a club for nearly two years.

== International ==
=== Youth ===
In 2003, Flores was chosen by coach Julio Grondona to be part of the Mexican squad participating in the 2003 FIFA U-17 World Championship in Finland. Flores played every single game in the tournament. Flores scored once in the tournament against China. Mexico reached the quarterfinal losing 2–0 against Argentina.

=== Senior ===
Mexico coach José Manuel de la Torre called up Flores to participate in the 2014 FIFA World Cup Qualifiers and the 2013 FIFA Confederations Cup.

Flores received his first cap in a friendly against Peru in San Francisco, California.

==== 2013 FIFA Confederations Cup ====
When Oribe Peralta was forced to withdraw from the Mexico squad because of injury, Mexico coach José Manuel de la Torre turned to Flores to replace him.

He started in only the two first games of Mexico in the 2013 FIFA Confederations Cup.

== Career statistics ==
=== International ===
As of match played 11 February 2016

National team	Year	Apps	Goals
Mexico	2013	7	0
Mexico	2015	7	0
Mexico	2016	1	0
Total		15	0

== Honours ==
Cruz Azul

- Copa MX: Clausura 2013, Apertura 2018
- CONCACAF Champions League: 2013–14

== See also ==
- List of people from Morelos
