= Antonio Buonomo =

Italian composer (1932–2025)

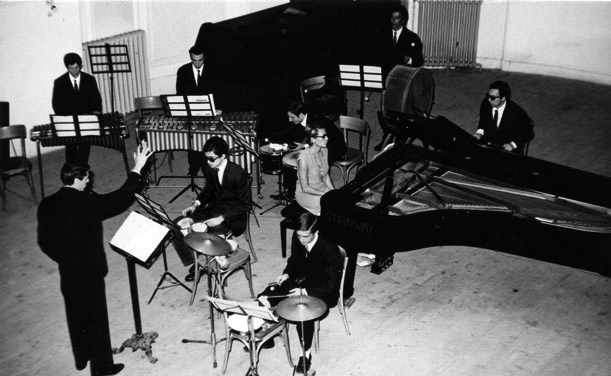
Buonomo conducting one of Europe's first percussion instrument ensembles (Naples Scarlatti Hall 1966)

Antonio Buonomo (13 December 1932 – 23 November 2025) was an Italian composer, solo percussionist, and music educator. A professor of percussion at the conservatories of "S.Pietro a Majella in Naples" of Naples and "S.Cecilia" of Rome, Buonomo's professional experience included performing as timpani soloist in various orchestras (such as the "San Carlo" of Naples and "La Fenice" of Venice), and director of one of Europe's first all-percussion instrument groups. His many compositions and transcriptions for percussion instruments have been published by the main houses of this sector and include teaching materials as well as music for plays and television documentaries. They have been performed for the occasion of prestigious avant-garde musical events, and television and radio programs as well as in public concerts.

== Life and career ==
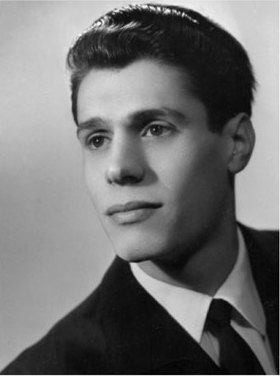
Buonomo in a typical photograph (50 years) to distribute to fans

Buonomo was born in Naples in December 1932. In the preface to his biography, he said that "being born into a family of musicians doesn't give you much choice".

The fifth of ten children, he began studying music before he even knew how to read or write. He was already performing at the age of 12 (as a conservatory student), playing the trumpet and drums with his father in many nightclubs in Naples in front of an audience of American soldiers from the Allied Forces. A career that was built on “coming up through the ranks” and playing just about any musical genre, from popular music and marching bands to jazz and contemporary music.

"His career is immense, and he has come a long way" as Il Centro (Abruzzo's newspaper) wrote. He was director of one of the first contemporary rhythmic music bands and a professor at the conservatories N.Piccinni in Bari, S.Pietro a Majella in Naples, Luisa D'Annunzio in Pescara, and Santa Cecilia in Rome. His didactic works were used as exams in national and international competitions and were adopted by high musical culture institutions in Italy and abroad.

He held seminars and specialization courses on an international level, training an entire generation of musicians with his method that are now featured soloists in orchestras and conservatory professors.

Buonomo is credited with being the first in Italy to prove that percussion instruments had a life of their own, since they include all parameters of the triple music root: rhythm, melody and harmony. So, these instruments were not (as many people used to think) a rhythm section to accompany other instruments or to simulate weather phenomena such as thunder or storms.

He continued his cultural operation until percussion courses were established inside Italian conservatories. He carried it out by writing ad hoc compositions and participating in radio and TV programs, as well as by playing pieces for percussion that had never been performed in Italy, during the concerts he conducted.

Having achieved great success among young people through daily concerts that were even held in schools (from middle schools to universities), in 1975 he recorded the first classical, pop, and contemporary all-percussion Italian music record in which he gathered the outcome of his studies and ideas.

Italy's newspaper, the Corriere della Sera, stated in November 1987: “He is a real authority on rhythm: as an internationally known percussionist and virtuoso, Antonio Buonomo is a versatile and passionate teacher who has published many works on his favorite subject, from pure percussion technique and rhythm perspectives.”

The most significant steps of his career, during which he knew and collaborated with music legends like Stravinsky, Hindemith and others, can be summarized as follows:

- he participated in major European festivals, like the International Contemporary Music Festival at the Venice Biennial (1960/61) and the Edinburgh International Festival (1963);
- he participated in the Italy on Stage in New York City with Irene Papas (1986);
- solo performances of contemporary music premiered in Italy;
- tours outside of Europe.

In 1983, the Minister of Public Education invited him to be part of the commission that drafted the program for percussion and solfège study for percussionists; he was called by the Opera Theatre in Rome during the Jubilee year to act as assistant conductor and music consultant, contributing to the creation of the Missa Solemnis pro Jubileo, by Franco Mannino, which had its world premiere at the Colosseum. His debut as author, together with his brother Aldo, dates back to 1965 with L’arte della percussione (The art of the percussion): the first European treatise, in three volumes (with guiding records) on classical, jazz and African-Latin-American percussion. It was a huge international success and probably the first time that an American publisher (Leeds Music Corporation in New York) showed an interest in Italian didactic books, requesting of editor Suvini-Zerboni that they be translated into English.

Buonomo died on 23 November 2025.

== Books ==
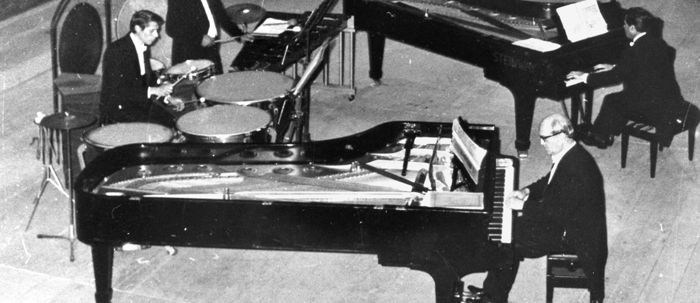
Performing as first percussion in Bartok's Sonata for Two Pianos and Percussion (Teatro San Carlo premiere - November 1969)

1965 - Aldo and Antonio Buonomo - L’Arte della percussione (The art of the percussion) - three volumes Suvini-Zerboni editions SZ6361/a - 6361/b - 6361/c;
1967 - Aldo and Antonio Buonomo - 'Il batterista autodidatta (Self-taught drum playing) - Suvini-Zerboni editions SZ 661;
1969 - Aldo and Antonio Buonomo - La tecnica del vibrafono (The technique of the vibraphone) - Suvini-Zerboni editions SZ 6882;
1973 - Aldo and Antonio Buonomo - Studi d’orchestra from Beethoven to Stockhausen - Suvini-Zerboni editions SZ698;
1979 - Antonio Buonomo - Musica d’insieme per strumenti a percussione (Collective music) - Curci editions EC10314;
1982 - Antonio Buonomo - Il suono della percussione (The sound of percussion) - Curci editions EC 10503;
1989 - Antonio Buonomo Clara Perra - La musica tra ritmo e creatività (Music between rhythm and creativity) - 2 volumes Curci editions EC 10644 EC 10645;
1991 - Antonio Buonomo - Timpani* (study and application of fundamental techniques) - Curci editions EC 10894;
1996 - Antonio Buonomo - Sapere per suonare (Music theory) - Curci edition ISBN 88-485-0723-9;
1998 - Antonio Buonomo - The Marimba* (Grip, sound, technique) - Curci editions EC 11299;
2001 - Antonio Buonomo - Born for the drum set * (Instinctive study of the drum set for children and beginners) book with CD - BMG Ricordi Editions ISMN M-2151-0569-0;
2004 - Antonio Buonomo - Beyond the rudiments** When technique becomes music (book with CD) - Carisch Editions; ISBN 88-507-0592-1;
2009 - Antonio Buonomo - Nati per la musica (Born for the music) book with audio book - Curci editions. ISMN 979-0-2159-0114-8, ISMN 9790215 105690;
2012 - Buonomo - The vibraphone* technique - Italian melodies - jazz improvisation - Suvini-Zerboni editions;
2013 - Antonio Buonomo - The innate instinct of the drums (when to play becomes a spontaneous gesture - book with CD - Curci editions;
2014 - Aldo e Antonio Buonomo - Method for drum and drum-set - Simeoli editions.
2018 - Antonio Buonomo - Davide Summaria - I CLASSICI DELLA MUSICA ETNICA** (Classics of ethnic music) The rhythms of dance in piano teaching - MP3 download - Simeoli editions.
2019 - Antonio Buonomo - Davide Summaria - DANZE ETNICHE per ensemble di percussioni ** (Ethnic dances for percussion ensemble) - MP3 download - Simeoli editions.
2019 - Antonio Buonomo - Biancaneve e le note parlanti* (Snow White and the talking notes) Musical fairytale to read, tell and recite - Simeoli Kids Editions.
2019 - Antonio Buonomo - Le mani - Lo strumento naturale per suonare e accompagnare* (Hands The natural instrument for playing and accompanying ) - Simeoli Kids Editions.
2020 - Antonio Buonomo - Quando il jazz lo facevano i tamburi* (When jazz was played by drums) History, analysis and learning of rhythmic music and the rhythm of words - Simeoli Editions.
2021 - Antonio Buonomo - Battute e frasi celebri di musicisti * (Diary of phrases and mottos from Bach to Schömberg ) - Simeoli Editions.
2022 - Antonio Buonomo - L'alfabeto del batterista percussionista * (The Percussionist-Drummer's Alphabet) Methodology from A to Z with video examples - Simeoli Editions.
2023 - Antonio Buonomo - From the studio to the limelight - Simeoli Editions.
2023 - Antonio Buonomo - Solfeggio and musical interpretation of classical, jazz and contemporary genres - Curci Editions.
2023 - List of didactic works, compositions and narrative.

(*) Italian-English text
(**) Italian, English, German and Spanish text

== Autobiography ==
2010 - Antonio Buonomo - L’arte della fuga in tempo di guerra (The art of the fugue during wartime) - Effepilibri editions. ISBN 978-88-6002-020-8
2020 - Antonio Buonomo - Dichiarazioni d'amore e di guerra (Special Centenary Edition) - Simeoli editions. ISBN 978-88-31317-04-7

== Main compositions – performed and published ==
- Spazio zero to search by vocal chords and object-instruments ( RAI premiere 1975);
- Vuoto for mimes, narrator and audience (premiere at the Exhibition on Avant-garde and Musical Research in Naples during the 1970s);
- Akwadum work recommended by the jury of the National Contest of Children's Music composition, by the province of Como, world premiere performance in the concert hall of the Conservatory G. Verdi in Como (Curci editions EC 11352);
- Afrikania premiere at the Opening “Agimus” season, Naples 1975 (Curci editions EC 11355);
- Leggenda Valacca elaboration in contemporary style of the famous Angel's Serenade by Gaetano Braga, commissioned to Buonomo by the author's hometown Administration, for the centenary of his death. (Curci editions ISBN 88-485-0793-X);
- Bach for percussion instruments RAI premiere 1976 (Curci editions EC 9867);
- Kluster premiere in the Concert Season of the Pescara's Music Academy (Curci editions EC11353);
- La strada del ritorno premiere “Ravello Concerts” (Curci editions EC 11458);
- Metallo dolce premiere Scarlatti Hall of the Conservatory of Naples;
- Latino classico premiere Concert Hall S. Cecilia Conservatory - Rome (Curci editions EC 11354);
- The Battle of Jericho premiere at the Theatre of Arts - Rome (Curci editions EC9908);
- Skin-deep sounds premiere at the international drum contest of the Conservatory “N. Piccinni” in Bari (Curci editions EC 11548 ISBN 88-485-0665-8);
- 4 antiche danze ungheresi (transcription) premiere at the Cilea Theatre Naples (Curci editions EC10314);
- Deep River premiere at the Theatre of Arts - Rome (Piccola Vela editions);
- Go Down Moses premiere at the Theatre of Arts - Rome (Piccola Vela editions);
- Alla turca (transcription - Curci editions EC10314);
- Oro Cristof* 5 sheets for a timpanist - Curci editions.

== Pop music compositions ==
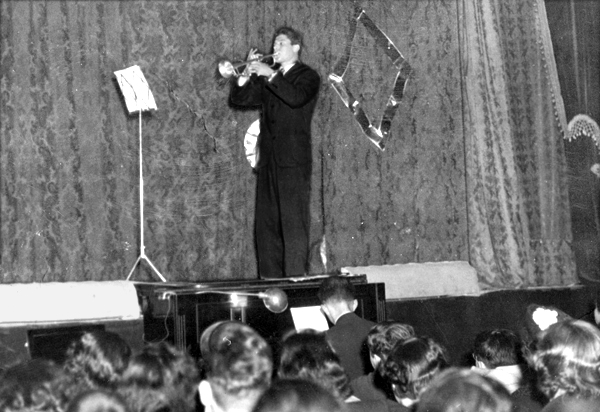
Antonio Buonomo playing Paganini's Carnevale di Venezia during a concert for the “Casa dello scugnizzo” (April 1952)

Occhi sognanti (slow song)
Tango del veliero
Bolero classico
Marialù

== Videos and slideshows ==
- Percussion and drums school: The future of technique for percussion instruments. DVD and Master Notes (an e-book in pdf format) - Curci editions ISMN 9790215912489;
- "Percussion and drums" on YouTube (trailer);
- Kluster on YouTube for 5 performers;
- Spazio zero on YouTube for vocal chords and object-instruments;
- Afrikania on YouTube (fragment) Ritual dances for percussion sextet;
- The Battle of Jericho on YouTube for voice solo, chorus and percussion;
- Deep river on YouTube for voice solo, chorus and percussion;
- Angel's Serenade on YouTube for percussion instruments;
- La strada del ritorno on YouTube for narrator (voice), percussion and Cello;
- Marialuì on YouTube for vibraphone, grand piano drums, and celesta;
- "Latino classico" on YouTube Rhythm variations on Mozartian themes for percussion instruments;
- "Suoni a fior di pelle" on YouTube Concert study for Snare Drum;
- "Nati per la musica" on YouTube (trailer);
- "L'innato istinto della batteria" on YouTube (trailer);
- "Il vibrafono" on YouTube (trailer).

(*) Italian-English text
(**) Italian, English, German and Spanish text

== Poems ==
The two souls of the drum
La strada del ritorno
Vuoto
Primavera all’antica (set to music by D. Summaria)
Ritmo amico
Foglie di lacrime (set to music by D. Summaria);

== Aphorisms ==
- "Rhythm is music's life."
- "A simple performer can become an artist by turning stage fright into an emotion to convey to the listener."
- "True music is not what we play or hear, but what gets to the listener without interference."
- "Everybody can create sounds by beating on any percussion, but only those produced by an expert touch can be called sounds."
- "A musician must find the real rhythm inside himself: it's the only thing that will lead him to a humanized performance where the metronome is of no use."
- "Forbidding spontaneous, by ear performance, is the same as to force a child to learn to read before he has learned to speak."
- "Rhythm is the principle of life and of all arts. Rhythmic music accompanies us in our daily activities, and even babies, as soon as they come into the world, have already assimilated it by inheritance."

== Main collaborations ==
- Teatro San Carlo Naples (trumpet, timpanist and solo percussionist)
- Teatro La Fenice Venice (timpanist)
- Teatro dell’Opera Rome (assistant conductor)
- Ensemble Tempo di percussione (conductor and solo percussionist)
- Italian Symphony Orchestra (timpanist)
- Orchestra Pomeriggi Musicali Milan (timpanist)
- Corpo Musicale Aeronautica Rome (principal trumpet)
- Orchestra Stabile Napoletana (principal trumpet)
- Orchestra Scarlatti RAI Naples (percussionist)
- Big band “Melodie di mezzo mondo” (principal trumpet)
- Havana orquesta (principal trumpet)
- RAI Orchestra Neapolitan Music (trumpet)

== News Rudiments ==
A technique needs constant and appropriate study in order to preserve all its potential intact
through time.
Rudiments is a study based upon the classics (outdated) that consists of repeating rhythmic models by heart over and over again, gradually gaining speed.
There is no rhythmic control of the execution of this kind of monotonous and repetitive practice because the drummer is playing by memory and practically by ear. There is no music being read and practice is aimed solely at one type of execution: “in rhythm”, accentuating the downbeat (which is always the loudest) like when one begins speaking.
With new rudiments - developed as exercises to be read and practiced through constant and precise acceleration of movements (made possible by the change in figuration) -, drummers will study technique, reading and rhythm at the same time. This way, not only will they put an end to that monotonous “in rhythm” practice, they will also develop control of the speed of the beats.

Just by studying the sequences and the various fingering, practicing will prepare the drummer for:

- fundamental rhythmic figures from two to fifteen beats (downbeats and off-beats)
- single, double and triple stroke rolls with accentuated downbeats and off-beats;
- single, double, and triple paradiddles;
- paradiddles with final triple beats and acciaccaturas (flam, drag etc.).

Lastly, the advantage of practicing without missing a beat: going from division accents to subdivision accents: an exercise that will come in very handy when playing in an orchestra where the conductor is holding the rhythm by beating the main accents and will also hold the secondary rhythm of the subdivision.

Sequences for drums and drum sets can be read or listened to in CD or practiced with the help of an animated video: a kind of Karaoke that allows drummers to check rhythm because the notes light up on the screen on the beat while playing.

== Sources ==
Reviews and testimonials of the world of music
Editors’ catalogues: Curci, Ricordi, Carisch, Effepilibri

- Curci in the world
- “Press notes” from p. 6 of the book Sapere per suonare, Curci editions
- Autobiography (Effepilibri editions)
- Encyclopedia of Neapolitan Music (Magmata Edition)
- Artistic acknowledgements
- Click on Photo gallery
