= Sergio Villa =

Sergio Villa (born c. 1986), better known as Sergio was a contestant on the Mexican reality show Buscando a Timbiriche, La Nueva Banda where he was one of 30 participants made up of 15 boys and 15 girls ranging in ages from 15 to 22. The contestants all lived in the "Escuela Timbiriche" in order to compete to become one of 7 members of the new band. Sergio, however, was eliminated from the show in the October 14, 2007 finale. Sergio was 21 years old at the time he was a contestant. He was born in Mexico City.

Despite his elimination in the show's finale (Episode 16), Sergio was consistently congratulated by the Timbiriche creators and Timbiriche Council as having one of the best voices on the show; In fact, Sergio had the greatest number of fans in Mexico and Latin America in comparison to all of the other Timbiriche contestants. In addition to his singing talent, he is also an ice skater, climber and swimmer.

Sergio plans to pursue a musical career. A rumor that an alternate band of Timbiriche is to be created by producer Eduardo Capetillo, has been published on several websites. This alternate band is said to include Sophia, Sergio, Marcela, Nain, Fabián and Verónica, all former contestants of Buscando a Timbiriche, La Nueva Banda. This information is not yet confirmed, however.
