= Jean Duverger =

Mexican actor (born 1973)

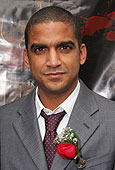
- Born: Jean Duverger; April 5, 1973 (age 53); Cosamaloapan, Veracruz, Mexico
- Occupations: Actor; dancer; TV presenter
- Years active: 1989–present
- Musical career
- Formerly of: Timbiriche

Jean Duverger (born 5 April 1973) is a Mexican actor and entertainer.

== Life and career ==
He is of French-Haitian ancestry. From 1981 to 1983, he studied at the Centro de Educacion Artística. Between 1988 and 1991, he was a backup dancer for the singer Yuri. Duverger was a member of Timbiriche from 1992-1993. He appeared in various telenovelas of Televisa from 1989 to 1999. In 2000 he began working for TV Azteca. He worked for Fox Sports in Mexico and was the host of the television show "Fox Para Todos" (Fox for Everyone). After leaving Fox, Duverger became a host of the morning show Sale el Sol. He currently runs his own agency, Agencia Libre.

In June 2015, Duverger revealed that he was contacted by various "agencies" that offered monetary compensation for favorable tweets of the Green Party, which he refused. This revelation came after speculation that unusually supportive tweets by celebrities and sports figures in the days prior to the 2015 elections had been bought by the Partido Verde.

== Filmography ==
=== Film and television ===
Year	Title	Role	Notes
1996	Última llamada	Tony	
1996-1998	Ritmoson Latino	Presenter	
1998	¿Qué nos pasa?	-	
2000-2001	Mejores amigos	Presenter	
2003	Zurdo	Capullo	
2005	Elektrízate	Presenter	
2005	Bailando por un millón	Contestant	Reality show
2008	Fútbol para todos	Presenter	
2009, 2012	Nocturninos	Presenter	
2012	The Fantastic World of Juan Orol	Black Baseball Player	
2014	El Ultimo Pitazo	Presenter	
2014	Fox para todos	Presenter	
