= Perras =

- Directed by: Guillermo Ríos
- Screenplay by: Guillermo Ríos
- Produced by: Tita Sánchez
- Starring: Claudia Zepeda; Scarlet Dergal; Eva Luna Marenco; Galilea Montijo; Karen de la Hoya; Steph Bumelcrownd; Alenka Ríos; Andrea Pedrero; Natalia Zurita; Denis Montes; Kariam Castro
- Cinematography: Juan Bernardo Sánchez Mejia
- Edited by: Elise Du-Rant; Guillermo Ríos; Tita Sánchez; Juan Bernardo Sánchez Mejía
- Music by: Daniel Hidalgo Valdés; Tomás Barreiro Guijosa; Pablo Chemor Nieto
- Production companies: Pelearán Diez Rounds Films; Fondo de Inversión y Estímulos al Cine
- Distributed by: Artecinema
- Release date: March 4, 2011
- Running time: 96 minutes
- Country: Mexico
- Language: Spanish

Perras (lit. Bitches) is a 2011 Mexican drama film directed by Guillermo Ríos based on the play of the same name. Its plot revolves around 10 schoolgirls who are all suspects of something terrible that happened at school, focusing in the memories and feelings of each girl. This is the device that gives us a glimpse of the ethics, games, aesthetics and eroticism of these girl-women.

The movie was heavily promoted as a thriller in trailers, posters and other media, but some critics found it misleading, since fits most in the drama category due to its content. The film premiered in theaters in Mexico City on March 4, 2011.

== Plot ==
A group of private secondary schoolgirls have to remain in their classroom and wait for the police to arrive and interrogate them, since they all are suspects of something terrible that had just happened at their school. The movie begins as the initial narrator quietly sits in the back of the classroom, separated from the rest, while the others simply ignore her. As they wait, the memories and feelings of each girl are explored. Each one has a story to tell, which explains how they become connected as the movie progresses, it is gradually revealed that Maria and Sofía, although they have opposite personalities, became best friends over time, and despite Maria's initial introverted nature, she was dazzled by Sofia's free way of life, gradually accepting it as her own, to the point where she agrees to have sex with her best friend's father. As a result, she becomes pregnant, and in a desperate attempt to terminate her pregnancy, she tries to perform an abortion in the school's bathroom. The abortion results in Maria's death due to blood loss, finally revealing that she has been dead from the beginning. It is not the real Maria, but her memory that is one who has been narrating, directing the story only to Diana, who being blind, has the ability to "spot her". One girl can be seen running away in panic from the area where the corpse is found, but it is unclear if she just found the body, or assisted Maria.

== Cast ==
- Claudia Zepeda as María del Mar Solís, a.k.a. "La Matada" (The Dead one). 15 years old, Aries. She loves to dance, she dreams of being a model and love is a main topic in her life. At first, she disliked being pointed out as a "good girl" due to her sweet and fragile appearance, but then she realized she could use it to her own advantage. She lives with her mother, who is a radio host. She's a good friend of Sofía, whom she admires and frequently visits at her home.
- Karen de la Hoya as Lourdes "Tora" Valenzuela, a.k.a. "La Gorda" (The Chubby one). 14 years old, Cancer. A fat and insecure girl who loves to party. She's known by every person in her neighborhood and she will soon celebrate her fifteen years birthday party, the Mexican equivalent of Sweet Sixteen. She's somewhat poor and is on a scholarship. Due to a car accident, she has to wear an orthopedic device on her leg. She's often bullied by the other girls, especially by Sofía, and her only true friend seems to be Frida. When she was little (played by Gema Nicte-Ha) she would spend a lot of time with her grandfather, who promised to organize her party.
- Scarlet Dergal as Sofía Ibar, a.k.a. "La Manchada" (The Motherfucker). 16 years old, Scorpio. A spoiled and mean girl who gets anything she wants. She's been expelled from many schools. She lives with her father, who is a judge and spends the weekends with her mother. She has no aspirations in life, so she picks on the other girls to distract herself. Deep down, she has a sweet nature, but she prefers to play as a bitch in order to impose respect to others.
- Steph Bumelcrownd as Iris Hernández, a.k.a. "La Ñoña" (The Airhead). 14 years old, Taurus. A ditzy and fresa girl who only wants to be pretty and dreams to be like Sofía. She loves to read all sorts of magazines. Her father is a doctor. She often carries with her a tiny pink purse where she keeps everything she needs. She considers herself to be Sofía's best friend.
- Andrea Pedrero as Diana Fragoso, a.k.a. "La Ciega" (The Blind). 15 years old, Pisces. A softspoken girl who was blinded at a young age after accidentally spilling antifreeze on her eyes. She has clairvoyance, which she tries to keep secret. However, from time to time she reveals her classmates secrets, reason why the other girls find her antipathetic, and often turns against her. She lives with her grandmother. Her mother is an alcoholic and her father lives with his other family.
- Eva Luna Marenco as Frida Gómez, a.k.a. "La Amiga" (The Friendly). 15 years old, Capricorn. She feels somewhat ashamed of her body development, which she hides by wearing baggy clothes. Her father is a corrupt policeman, so her family is well off. She loves to read and seems to be Tora's only true friend. She's the only character in the movie who is also presented 20 years later, as a middle age woman played by Actress Galilea Montijo. She talks about the events at the school as part of her past.
- Natalia Zurita as Patricia Gaytán, a.k.a. "La Zorra" (The Slut). 17 years old, Virgo. An extroverted and easygoing girl. Her family used to be wealthy and she attended to a private school, but after pictures of her having sex with a senator were spread, she was expelled. She has a weakness for expensive cars and dreams to move to New York to become a dancer.
- Denis Montes as Alejandra Suárez, a.k.a. "La Valemadres" (The 'I don't give a shit' girl). 16 years old, Sagittarius. A rude, but friendly rebellious girl. She loves to watch soap-operas and has a big Star Wars collection. She's bisexual. She lives with her family at her grandmother's apartment. Her family often mistreats her grandmother. Her father often travels around the world and brings souvenirs to his family.
- Kariam Castro as Andrea Romero, a.k.a. "La Rara" (The Weirdo). 14 years old, Libra. A lonely and eccentric girl. She has no real motivation in life, although she likes to dance. She likes to get obsessed with boys, until they become her boyfriends, then she loses any interest in them. Her mother is an alcoholic and she lives with her father and his family. She hates her new family and prefers to spend time with her mother, even though they get into terrible arguments.
- Alenka Ríos as Ana Ceci Flores, a.k.a. "La Mustia" (The Gloomy). 17 years old, Gemini. A troubled girl. She has a black sense of humor. Her parents are teachers who think she's a troublemaker, but actually the troublemaker is her sister, who Ana Ceci admires. She often hangs out with Sofía and Iris.

The main cast of the movie created Facebook profiles for their respective characters where they explain some aspects of their characters that weren't explored in the movie.

== Original stage play ==
Previously, around 2008, there was a stage play of Perras written by Guillermo Ríos with the following cast:

- Karen De La Hoya – Tora "La Gorda"
- Kariam Castro – Andrea "La Rara"
- Natalia Zurita – Patricia "La Zorra"
- Eva Luna Marenco – Frida "La Amiga"
- Galilea Montijo – Frida (as a middle age adult) "La Más Perra"
- Andrea Pedrero – Diana "La Ciega"
- Denis Montes – Alejandra "La Valemadres"
- Claudia Zepeda – María del Mar "La Matada"
- Scarlet Dergal – Sofía "La Manchada"
- Alenka Ríos – Ana Ceci "La Mustia". She's the only actress who appeared in both the stage play and movie, although she played different characters.
- Steph Boumelcroud – Iris "La Ñoña"

== Reception ==
The movie has received mixed to bad critics. On IMDb has received an average rating of 5.3, with similar ratings on other rating movie databases such as Letterboxd and TMDB. The critics questioned mostly the participation of adult women as the main characters, playing as secondary school girls, instead of casting true teenage actress (a common practice in Mexican TV shows), and the frequent and unnecessary allusions to old Mexican soap operas and some connotations not according to the age the main characters supposedly have. At some point in the movie the girls mention their favorite singer is an old ballad Mexican singer, instead of any pop star of their age, and their favorite TV shows are the kind middle age or senior adults watch, as if the screenwriter had no clue of the likes of an actual teenager. The girls also seem to be very familiar with real life events that happened 20–30 years ago, before they even were born. The presence of an adult version of Frida talking about her past may indicate the complete story is actually a memory, which may explain those time issues, but the furniture, cars, clothes and other media present in the movie indicates it is happening in actual times. The movie has also been criticized for being written from a misogynous perspective, which frequently remarks "that all girls just want to do it", and it is not easy to say what the real subject of the movie is, since there are so many: the discovery of sexuality, discrimination, chance, drugs, maternity, traditions, betrayals, power, love. A mural of a complex reality from the point of view of twenty-something women in the skin of 14 to 17-year-old girls.

== Home video releases ==
The DVD and Blu-ray were released in late 2011.
