= Clara Perra =

Italian composer

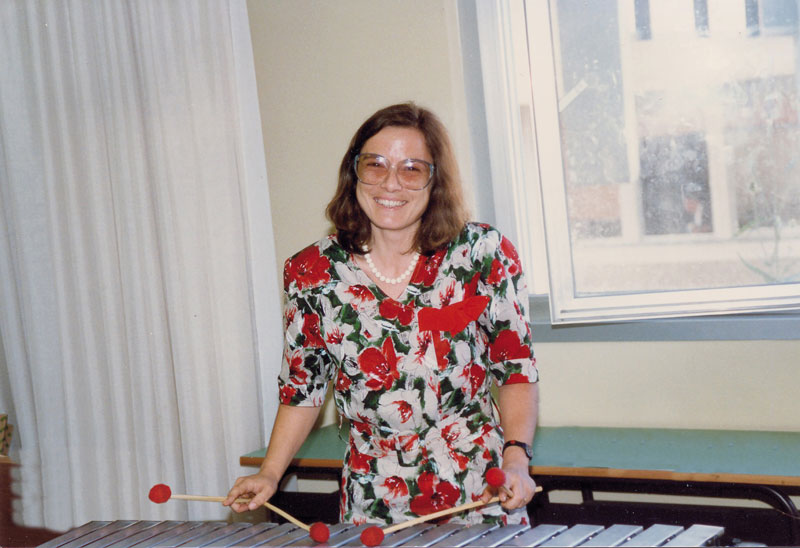
Clara Perra Naples Teatro di San-Carlo 1983

Clara Perra (Naples November 1954 - Roseto degli Abruzzi - August 2015) was an Italian solo percussionist, music educator, pianist and composer.

She was the first Italian woman to hold concerts of percussion instruments and to teach them in State conservatories. Author of compositions and educational works, Clara Perra won several national auditions and an international competition, at the Orchestra of the Teatro di San Carlo in Naples. She played at the Italy on Stage festival in New York and in several concert tours she performed in repertoires ranging from classics transcribed for vibraphone, like Schumann, Bach and Mozart to the "classics" of contemporary music such as Varese and Cage (which, among other things, included the percussion part and the prepared piano of "Amores" performed for the first time ever in Naples).

== Biography ==
=== Early life ===
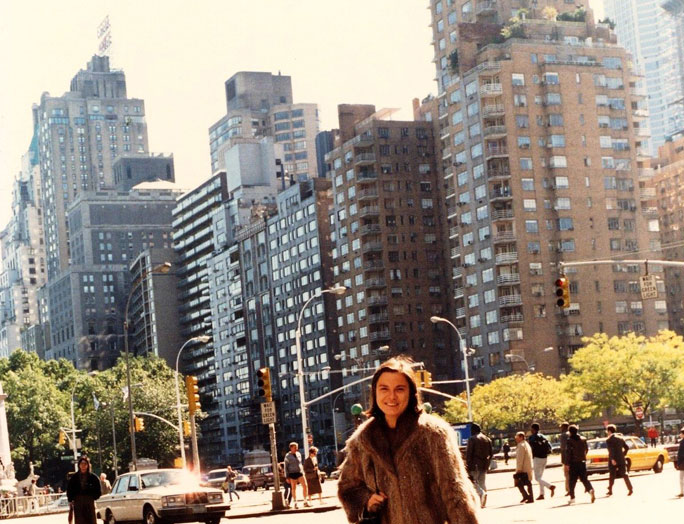
Clara Perra New York Italy on stage festival1987

Despite having started to study piano at the age of six, she did not expect to pursue a career in music until much later in life. After listening to a concert of percussion instruments as a young adult, she “succumbed” to the "rataplan" rhythms, an event that convinced her to leave medical school and enrol in the music conservatory. In a short time, she graduated in piano and percussion instruments (the latter degree with honours and a special academic mention) and began studying composition with Aladino Di Martino, director of the "San Pietro a Majella " Conservatory in Naples.

=== Career ===
In 1984 she was the only Italian percussionist to become part of the Orchestre des Jeunes de la Mediterranee (with which she performed in major European capitals). Later, she won four national auditions and an international competition at the Orchestra of the Teatro di San Carlo in Naples. She played in this theatre for over a decade, collaborating with world renowned conductors and performers. She was recognised and praised for both her work as a percussionist and as a conductor, and had to overcome some cultural bias against women playing percussion instruments.

She played at the Italy on stage festival in New York (1987); at the Wiesbaden festival (1983) and several International Festivals of Ravello; she directed various groups of percussionists and participated in numerous recordings of contemporary and experimental music.

Before completing her musical studies, she was already part of the Franco Ferrara Orchestra, the Scarlatti RAI, the jazz-symphonic Italian Symphony Orchestra and the soloists of the Tempo di Percussione Ensemble, a formation with which she also performed during the concert season at the Teatro di San Carlo.

Regarding her teaching material, she illustrated the technique contained in the DVD "Percussion and Drums School" (Curci 1995); she participated in the recording of the CD accompanying the book "Beyond the Rudiments" (Carisch 2004); she wrote essays, compositions and methods. Particular highlights include the work released in two volumes "Music Between Rhythm and Creativity" (Curci 1987): a project in collaboration with Antonio Buonomo, for which the newspaper "Corriere della Sera" devoted a full page review) and "Il Braccio del Tempo" (Simeoli 2015): a handbook that reveals the "secrets" of the orchestra pit, with amusing anecdotes about the conductors. It clarifies the concept of "visual rhythm" and concludes with polyrhythm exercises for two and three voices.

Her profession as a soloist and orchestra conductor always ran alongside her work as a teacher and conductor of percussion ensembles. After teaching at conservatories in Benevento, Foggia, Potenza and Salerno, in compliance with a law that prohibited people who played in an orchestra to teach, in 1991 she was forced by the law to leave the orchestra of the Teatro di San Carlo, to maintain her role as a teacher. Becoming a tenured professor at the "A. Casella" Conservatory in Aquila, and later at the "Luisa D'Annunzio" Conservatory in Pescara, she trained an entire generation of soloists, conductors and teachers. In her spare time, Clara Perra was a voluntary for blood donor association AVIS (Italian Association for Blood Donation) and the C.R.I. (Italian Red Cross). For this reason, due to a mild illness, she was taken to the hospital by her own colleagues where she was observed for a long time. She was transferred to a more suitable hospital only when the symptoms of encephalitis became more evident, and she died before treatment could be effective.

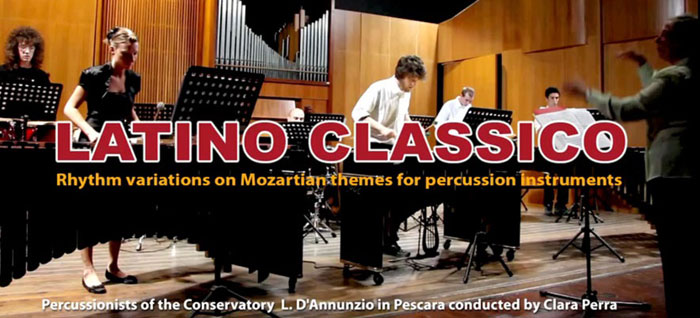
Clara Perra Pescara 2011

== Main publications ==
- IL BRACCIO DEL TEMPO - From a visual rhythm to the polyrhythm (Simeoli Edition);
- I CLASSICI PER STRUMENTI A PERCUSSIONE (Cembalo Edition);
- ASSONANZE DEL PASSATO - For vibraphone (Simeoli Edition);
- MINUETTO DEL TIMPANISTA (Simeoli Edition);
- LA MUSICA TRA RITMO E CREATIVITÀ
  (Music between rhythm creativity) - vol I - il sistema batteria jazz ( Curci Edition);
- LA MUSICA TRA RITMO E CREATIVITÀ - vol II - Musica e Musik
  Study on the traditional rhythmic problems and interpretation of new contemporary writing. (Curci Edition)

== Main collaborations ==
- Teatro di San Carlo - Naples - Marimbist, vibraphonist and solo percussionist
- "Orchestra Franco Ferrara - Timpanist"
- "Orchestre Des Jeunes De La Mediterranée - Xilofonist and solo percussionist"
- "Orchestra Scarlatti RAI-TV - Vibrafonist and solo percussionist"
- "Italian Symphony Orchestra - Solo percussionist"
- Ensemble Tempo di percussione - Solo percussionist, pianist, marimbist and vibrafonist

== Some prizes and awards ==
- Ensemble Winner of the international competition “orchestra Teatro di San Carlo
- Shield of thanks from the Ministry of Education Conservatory of Vibo Valentia (April 2000);
- "Shield concert "Musical Folklore in the world" (May 1978);"
- Poem The two souls of the drum (2009) on YouTube;
