= Galilea Montijo =

Mexican entertainer (born 1973)

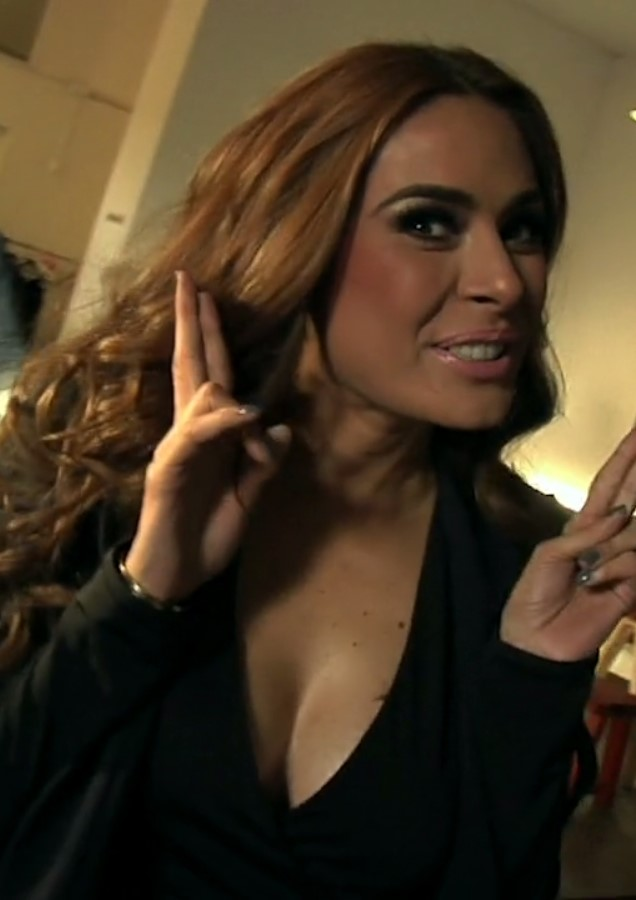
- Montijo in 2015
- Born: Martha Galilea Montijo Torres; June 5, 1973 (age 53); Guadalajara, Jalisco, Mexico Mexico
- Occupations: Actress; comedian; model; TV presenter
- Years active: 1993–present
- Spouse: Fernando Reina Iglesias (m. 2011; div. 2023)
- Children: 1

Galilea Montijo (born Martha Galilea Montijo Torres on June 5, 1973) is a Mexican actress, comedian, model, and TV presenter. She currently hosts Hoy, a morning show of Televisa that airs on Mondays through Fridays in Mexico (on Las Estrellas) and in the United States (on Univision). Montijo hosted the talent-reality show Pequeños Gigantes, which was a success in Mexico and in the United States (again shown by Univision) in its 1st and 2nd editions (2011 and 2012 respectively). In 2014, she hosted "Va Por Ti" - a co-production of Univision and Televisa that first aired on Univision, beating the competition in the ratings. In 2015, she hosts "Me Pongo De Pie" which will air in Mexico and the United States.

== Career ==
Montijo started her career after winning La Chica TV in 1993. She has participated in several telenovelas. From 2001 to 2005, Galilea hosted the show VidaTV. In 2002, she participated in the reality show Big Brother VIP and won. In 2005, she also participated in the second season of Bailando por un Sueño. In 2006, Montijo starred in the Mexican telenovela La Verdad Oculta, opposite Gabriel Soto.

== Personal life ==
In November 2020, she announced that she had tested positive for COVID-19 and had to cancel a number of professional engagements.

She is accused by journalist Anabel Fernández in her books having relationship with Mexican drug lord Arturo Beltrán Leyva, and received the gifts from him

== Filmography ==
=== Television ===
- El premio mayor (1995) as Lilí
- Azul (1996) as Mara
- Tú y yo (1996) as Resignación
- Tres mujeres (1999) as Maricruz Ruiz
- Fantástico amor (1999)
- Hoy (1999, 2004–2007, 2008-)
- El precio de tu amor (2000) as Valeria Ríos
- Vida TV (2001-2005) Host
- Big Brother VIP (2002) Contestant, winner.
- Hospital el paisa (2004)
- Bailando por un sueño (2005) Contestant, fourth place.
- La verdad oculta (2006) as Gabriela Guillén de Genovés / Martha Saldívar de Guzmán
- La Hora de la Papa (2007) Host
- Buscando a Timbiriche, La Nueva Banda (2007) Host
- Teleton Mexoamerica (2007-2008) Host, on Galavision
- ¿Cuanto quieres perder? (2008) Host
- Los simuladores (2008–2009) as herself (two episodes)
- Hazme reír y serás millonario (2009) Contestant, third place.
- Mujeres Asesinas (2009) as Lorena Garrido (Episode: "Las Garrido, codiciosas")
- Hasta que el dinero nos separe (2010) as herself (special episode)
- Pequeños Gigantes (2011–2020) Host
- El gran show de los Peques (2011) Host
- Lo que más quieres (2013) Judge of Emotions
- Cásate conmigo, mi amor (2013) as Valeria
- Va por ti (2014) Host
- Me pongo de pie (2015) Host
- Teleton Mexico (2011–Present) Host, on Televisa El Canal De Las Estrellas
- Teleton USA (2012–Present) Host, on Univision
- La Más Draga: Solo Las Más (2026) Host

=== Films ===
- Perras (2011) as adult Frida
- La muerte de un Cardenal (1993)
