= Edgar's Fall =

2006 viral video from Mexico

La Caída de Edgar
- Starring: Edgardo "Edgar" Martínez
- Release date: May 8, 2006 (uploaded)
- Running time: 0:42
- Country: Mexico
- Language: Spanish

Edgar's Fall (Spanish: La Caída de Edgar) is a video that was uploaded to YouTube on May 8, 2006, from Mexico. This internet meme went viral on YouTube, with over 87 million views as of March 2026.

== History ==
The video clip features Mexican boys Edgar Martínez and Fernando, hiking in a ranch near their hometown of Monterrey with their uncle, Raúl, who serves as the cameraman and tour companion. It starts with Edgar expressing fear on using a makeshift bridge made from two long branches that crosses a small stream when Fernando makes a joke about pushing Edgar off the bridge into the water. Fernando assures the still-hesitant Edgar that he wouldn't fall, which temporarily consoles the latter, who then commences the crossing. Once Edgar is at the middle of the bridge, Fernando starts moving one of the branches, causing the former to curse angrily in a Mexican norteño (more specifically, northeastern) accent, saying "¡Ya wey!, ¡pinche pendejo wey!, ¡ya!" After Edgar calls Fernando an "idiota" (idiot) while begging for him to stop, Fernando drops the branch and Edgar finally loses his balance, plunging into the stream. Edgar curses more intensively as he emerges from the water, while Fernando asks for forgiveness.

In a video uploaded in 2017 in his channel Edgar cleared up some misconceptions, including the fact that his name is actually Edgardo and that Fernando, the boy who threw him in the stream is actually a friend of his cousin and not a cousin of his.

== Impact on Mexico's popular media ==
Edgar's Fall was the subject of much media exposure in Mexico, including in newspapers and on the TV news.

There are ringtones, games, parodies, remixes and even a web page where Edgar is proposed for Mexico's presidency. There are over 20 versions of the video including Star Wars, Mario Brothers, Street Fighter, Counter Strike, Naruto, Mortal Kombat, Fall Guys and Pokémon. Some publicity campaigns have made use of the video without concern for copyright issues, for example Nike's Joga Bonito campaign.

=== Edgar's Revenge ===
In 2007, Edgar, Fernando and Raúl were featured in a commercial called La Venganza de Edgar (Edgar's Revenge), which was made by a Mexican cookie company, Gamesa, as part of a series of commercials for the company's Emperador (Emperor) brand of cookies. The Emperador commercials showed people acting like they were a Roman Emperor, calling their guards to turn things in their favor.

The Edgar's Revenge commercial, which also became a viral video, re-enacts the situation seen in the original video, with the curse words Edgar uttering being beeped out. Instead of Edgar falling in the river, he screams "Guardias!" and suddenly Roman soldiers appear, to the shock of Fernando. Edgar orders the Roman guards to throw Fernando in the water by saying, "Al río, güey" and, despite Fernando's protests, they do so. At Edgar's command, Raúl is also thrown into the water. The video was made by Gamesa's ad agency in Mexico, Olabuenaga Chemistri, and was aired for a short time.

=== YouTube México ===
In 2007, YouTube launched the Mexican version of its website, with content oriented towards Mexicans. During the launch, Edgar was present with Coyoacán Joe where he filmed a welcome video for YouTube México.
