= Perras (surname) =

Perras is a French surname. Notable people with the surname include:

- Anita Perras (born 1960), Canadian country music singer
- Dominique Perras (born 1974), Canadian cyclist
- Fizalam-William Perras (1876–1936), Canadian politician
- Margherita Perras (1908–1984), Greek soprano
- Mike Perras (born 1963), Canadian DJ
- Scott Perras (born 1983), Canadian biathlete
