= Brissia Mayagoitia =

Mexican singer and actress

- Born: Brissia Daniela Mayagoitia Orta; August 3, 1991 (age 35); Saltillo, Coahuila, Mexico
- Genre: Pop
- Occupations: Singer, actress
- Instrument: Vocals
- Years active: 2004–present
- Label: EMI Televisa

Brissia Daniela Mayagoitia Orta better known as Brissia (born August 3, 1991, in Saltillo, Coahuila) is a Mexican singer, reality television star, and actress. She gained national popularity in Mexico during her childhood as a singer on reality TV and later as a member of Mexican pop band La Nueva Banda. Mayagoitia left the band to become a solo artist in 2008. The remaining band members continued without her, but split in the spring of 2009. In 2023, the band reunited for a series of concerts across Mexico as part of the El 2000's Pop Tour. She rejoined the group in 2023.

== Career ==
When she was twelve years old, Mayagoitia participated in the second season of the Mexican reality TV show for children, Código F.A.M.A. She placed fifth and received a silver medal.

In 2006, Mayagoitia participated in the Telemundo reality singing competition Quinceañera: Mamá Quiero Ser Artista in the United States. On the show, she competed with female teenage singers from across Latin American and the US, including pre American Idol alum Allison Iraheta for the main prize of $50,000 and a recording contract. Mayagoitia finished in second place with Iraheta taking the grand prize.

In 2007, she took part in a reality show called Buscando a Timbiriche, La Nueva Banda. She selected as the first member of the band. She sang the first song on their album, along with teammate Eduardo. Mayagoitia left the band in 2009 to pursue a solo career. In 2011, Mayagoitia was cast in a lead role in the Mexican theatre production of Hairspray with friend and former La Nueva Banda bandmate, Eduardo Brito. The pair were invited to perform at festivals throughout Mexico in late 2010. In August 2011, Mayagoitia was cast in an episode of the Mexican television series, Como Dice El Dicho. The episode aired in September 2011. This appearance marked her debut appearance as an actress as well as her first television appearance since Buscando a Timbiriche, La Nueva Banda.

In 2013, Mayagoitia posed for Playboy Mexico magazine in the January issue. In 2021, she appeared as a contestant on Survivor Mexico. The show was filmed in the Dominican Republic. The competition aired in Mexico and ended its run in August 2021. She was the fifth contestant eliminated from the show. She appeared as a vocalist on the reality singing competition, Quiero Cantar, which aired on TV Azteca in Mexico in 2021. She contracted COVID-19 during the taping of Quiero Cantar and was temporarily removed from the competition until she tested negative for the virus.

== Personal life ==
Mayagoitia was raised by her mother and maternal grandmother. Her father was not involved in her upbringing. She suffered from bullying during her childhood due to her artistic career aspirations. She is a supporter of LGBTQ rights and dedicated her 2013 Playboy Mexico photos to the gay and lesbian community in Mexico, who were bullied. Shortly after winning a spot in La Nueva Banda Timbiriche, Mayagoitia began dating César D'Alessio, son of Mexican singer and actress Lupita D'Alessio. The couple split up in 2010. She resides in Mexico City.

== Discography ==
- La Nueva Banda Timbiriche (2007)

=== Singles ===
- "Tú, tú, tú" (2008)
- "Aunque Digas" (2009)
- Sales: 85,000

== Filmography ==
=== Theatre ===
- 2010: Hairspray (Mexican version)

==== Television ====
- 2011: Como dice el dicho ('El Que Es Buen Gallo Donde Quiera Canta') as Mayte.
- 2011: Tengo Talento Mucho Talento ('Estrella TV')
