= Gabriela Sánchez (singer) =

Mexican singer

Gabriela Sánchez (born June 1, 1987), better known as "Gaby Sánchez", is a Mexican singer and model. She was a contestant on the 2007 Mexican reality show, Buscando a Timbiriche, La Nueva Banda and is a member of the pop group, La Nueva Banda Timbiriche.

== Career ==
She moved from Guadalajara to Mexico City in 2007 following a successful casting in a new reality music competition. She competed on the reality show, Buscando a Timbiriche, La Nueva Banda in 2007. She was later named as the fourth member to the band, alongside six other contestants. During the reality show she dated contestant and later bandmate, Alberto Dogre. She sang the theme song of the 2009 Mexican telenovela, Cuidado con el Angel (Beware of the Angel). The song, "Sólo Tú", was later released as the third single from La Nueva Banda, from their debut album. The song was one of their most successful singles. La Nueva Banda Timbiriche split in 2009; she rejoined the band in 2023 and embarked on a multi-city tour of Mexico that same year as part of the El 2000's Pop Tour. The tour's popularity led to a second leg of concerts in Mexico which began in March 2024.

== Personal life ==
She is married to former Mexican professional footballer, Gerardo "Jerry" Flores, who previously played with Cruz Azul. The couple met in 2015 and after 6 months of dating, they were engaged. She is a professional fitness trainer, who received her training certification from Sport City University de México and specializes in strength training. She is an avid football fan and worked as a model for local football advertisements in Guadalajara, after La Nueva Banda Timbiriche first disbanded in 2009. It was revealed in 2009 that she suffered from anorexia after leaving Guadalajara for Mexico City in 2007 in pursuit of her music career. She has since recovered. She and Flores married 2016 and reside in Guadalajara, Mexico. She is a fan of the Mexican football team, Cruz Azul.

== Discography ==
- 2007: La Nueva Banda Timbiriche (Debut album)

Singles:

- "Tú,Tú,Tú" (2008)
- "Aunque digas" (2008; re-released as a live tour version in 2024)
