= ASI =

Asi or ASI may refer to:

== Asi ==
- Asii, ancient people of Central Asia
- Asi, another name for the Orontes River
- Asi language, a language spoken in Southern Philippines, mainly in the islands comprising the province of Romblon
- Asi, Muscogee language for the black drink brewed by Native Americans of the Southeastern United States
- Así, album by Benny Ibarra
- Asi (Mahabharata), a sword in the Sanskrit epic poem Mahabharata
- Asi (TV series), a Turkish TV series
- Asi Taulava (born 1973), Filipino-Tongan professional basketball player

== Acronyms ==
=== Technology ===
- Artificial superintelligence
- AS-Interface (written "AS-i"), or Actuator Sensor Interface, a type of fieldbus
- Airspeed indicator
- Asynchronous serial interface, standardised transport interface for the broadcast industry
- Advanced Switching Interconnect, a peer-to-peer enhancement of PCI Express
- Area-specific impedance, a measure of Acoustic impedance
- Automatic Semicolon Insertion in JavaScript
- Autonomous Solutions, Inc., technology company

=== Organizations ===
- Acta Slavica Iaponica, a Japanese Slavistics journal
- Adam Smith Institute, a neoliberal think tank in the United Kingdom
- Advertising Specialty Institute, an American company serving the advertising specialty industry
- Albert Shanker Institute, American labor organization
- Animals & Society Institute, a scholarly society for human-animal studies
- Anthropological Survey of India, agency for anthropological studies of India
- Applied Spectral Imaging, a biomedical company
- Archaeological Services Inc., Canadian archaeological and cultural company
- Archaeological Survey of India, agency for archaeological research and preservation in India
- Artemis Society International, a 1990s lunar colonization effort connected to the Moon Society
- Agenzia Spaziale Italiana (Italian Space Agency)
- Asian Social Institute, a social sciences research institute and graduate school in Manila, the Philippines
- American Strategic Insurance, an American insurance company

=== Other uses ===
- Ancestral South Indian, in genetics and archaeogenetics of South Asia
- Anjuman Serfaroshan-e-Islam
- Anti-suit injunction, a legal injunction
- Arrêt sur images, a French television program
- Assistant Sub-Inspector of Police, a rank in the Indian police
- RAF Ascension Island (IATA airport code ASI)

== See also ==
- Asia
- Asia (disambiguation)
