= Grumpy Christmas =

- Poster
- Spanish: Una navidad no tan padre
- Directed by: Raúl Martínez
- Starring: Renata Notni; Angélica María; Alex Rose Wiesel
- Distributed by: Netflix
- Release date: December 21, 2021
- Running time: 87 minutes
- Country: Mexico
- Language: Spanish

Grumpy Christmas (Spanish: Una navidad no tan padre) is a 2021 Mexican comedy film directed by Raúl Martínez and starring Renata Notni, Angélica María and Alex Rose Wiesel. It was released on Netflix on December 21, 2021. It is a sequel to the 2016 theatrical film Un padre no tan padre.

== Cast ==
- Renata Notni
- Angélica María
- Alex Rose Wiesel as Gala (voice)
- Héctor Bonilla as Don Servando
- Jacqueline Bracamontes as Alma
- Juan Pablo de Santiago
- Tina Romero
- Benny Ibarra as Fran
- Eduardo Tanus as Memo
- Natália Subtil as Gio
- Tina French as Gina
- Yulian Diaz as Joao
