= ASY =

ASY or Asy may refer to:

== Places ==
- Anstey railway station (station code), Australia
- Ashley Municipal Airport (IATA code), United States
- Ashley railway station (National Rail code), England
- Asy, Kazakhstan, a village and the administrative center of Jambyl District, Jambyl

== Computing ==
- .asy, source code file extension of Asymptote (vector graphics language)
- ASY, a software articulatory synthesizer in articulatory synthesis

== Other uses ==
- Asmat language (ISO 639-3 code), Yaosakor dialect of West Papua
- Annual sustainable yield, in sustainable yield in fisheries
- ASy, several Messerschmitt Bf 109 variants
- Asy (Asya Saavedra), musician in the girl band Chaos Chaos

== See also ==
- Eman El-Asy (born 1985), Egyptian actress
- Asi (disambiguation)
