= Vapor Apparel =

- Company type: Private
- Industry: Textile - Apparel Clothing
- Founded: 2004
- Founder: Chris Bernat, Jackson Burnett
- Headquarters: Hanahan, SC, United States
- Key people: Chris Bernat (CRO), Jackson Burnett (President)
- Parent: Source Substrates, LLC
- Website: www.vaporapparel.com

Vapor Apparel is a d/b/a (doing business as) of Source Substrates, LLC. It is a manufacturer and decorator of performance apparel, specializing in apparel engineered for dye sublimation and sublimation print services using a heat press. The company was founded in 2004 and is headquartered in Hanahan, South Carolina, with distributors located in Canada, Europe, New Zealand, and Australia.

Vapor Apparel is recognized by the Specialty Graphic Imaging Association (SGIA), Impressions and Wearables magazines, and the Advertising Specialty Institute (ASI) for award-winning product development and print quality.

== Founding & Growth ==
Founded in 2004 in the garage of the owners, Vapor Apparel moved in 2008 into larger facilities located at the Navy Yard at Noisette, a mixed-use development on the campus of what used to be the Charleston Naval Shipyard. The following year, Vapor Apparel expanded its head office again, moving from a 2,200 square feet office into its current location of 22,000 square feet, which houses a production facility, warehouse, and front office.

Even through the Great Recession, Vapor Apparel saw steady growth. In 2008, it experienced a sales increase of 20 percent from the previous year. Two years later, the Charleston Business Journal listed Vapor Apparel as part of its “Roaring 20” – a list of the 20 fastest-growing companies in the Charleston region. That same year, The Capital Corporation listed Vapor Apparel as the 18th fastest growing company in the state of South Carolina. Vapor Apparel was also a “Roaring 20” winner in 2011.

In 2013, Vapor Apparel announced the launch of cut and sew services, in addition to its current service offerings of dye sublimation printing, screen printing, direct to garment printing, and all over printing.

== Environmental Sustainability ==
Vapor Apparel's North American headquarters are in a planned, environmentally friendly urban center. The facilities are LEED-Certified (Leadership in Energy and Environmental Design) as outlined by the US Green Building Council.

Vapor Apparel manufactures most of its apparel in Colombia. As a nation, Colombia generates a high percentage of its power from non-fossil fuels because of access to hydro and geothermal electricity sources. More than 67.3 percent of Vapor Apparel's manufacturing facility's power was generated via hydro-electric from 2003 through 2006.

Colombia has also maintained its ranking as one of the top 30 countries on Yale University's EPI index (Environmental Performance Index). This index measures the efforts of 163 countries worldwide.

In partnership with UNIFI Inc. of Greensboro, North Carolina, Vapor Apparel has begun developing products from Eco-Friendly yarns. The yarn, named Repreve, is made from 100 percent recycled materials, including post-consumer and post-industrial polyester fibers. In 2008 the company debuted its first garment utilizing these recycled materials named the "Vapor ECO."

== Awards ==
2013: Wearables magazine "Apparel Design Awards: Leading Products in the Industry"

2012: Impressions magazine “Outstanding Achievement,” 2nd Place (Sublimation on Finished Apparel)

2011: SGIA “Outstanding Service Award”

2011: Impressions magazine “Outstanding Achievement,” 2nd Place (Sublimation on Finished Apparel)

2011: Charleston Business Journal “Roaring 20” Winner

2010: SGIA “Product of the Year Award” (Digital Textile)

2010: Impressions magazine “Outstanding Achievement,” 3rd Place (Digital Apparel Decoration)

2010: Impressions magazine “Outstanding Achievement,” 1st Place (Eco-Friendlier Apparel Decoration)

2010: Charleston Business Journal “Roaring 20” Winner

2010: “South Carolina’s Fastest-Growing Companies for 2010” listing from The Capital Corp.

2010: SGIA “Best in Category” Golden Image Award (Light Garment Digital)

2010: SGIA “Best in Category” Golden Image Award (Digital Transfer)

2009: Impressions magazine “Outstanding Achievement,” 2nd Place (Digital Decoration)

2009: DPI “Product of the Year” (Micro Performance Repreve)

2008: SGIA “Outstanding Service Award”

2008: Impressions magazine “Outstanding Achievement,” 2nd Place (Digital Garment Decoration)

2007: SGIA “Outstanding Service Award”

2007: Impressions magazine “Outstanding Achievement,” 1st Place (Digital Garment Decoration)

2006: Impressions magazine “Outstanding Achievement,” Honorable Mention (Digital Decoration)
