= Fan-gating =

Form of promotion on Facebook

Fan-gating (also known as "Like-gating") is the practice of acquiring more fans for a Facebook page by requiring Facebook users to "like" the page in order to access specific content associated with the page. This content is typically exclusive features, promotional offers, games or other material.

On August 8, 2014, Facebook updated their platform policies to forbid businesses and developers from using like-gating on new apps, while existing apps will need to comply by November 5, 2014.

== Issues with overuse ==
If fan-gating is overused with an inadequate payoff for users who agree, it can lead to Like fatigue. Further, users may become bored if they encounter fan-gates frequently.

The main problem is that there is no interest in the content of the brand. Using the method of the "Fan-gating" you confuse Facebook statistics. Damage the user experience, resulting less time to your fan page. This affects advertisers.

== Response from Facebook ==
In August 2014 Facebook updated its platform policy to combat fan-gating, with an explanation that artificial incentives do not benefit people nor advertisers. Since then a lot of webmasters and app developers shifted away from the practice of like-gating.
