= Berendsohn =

Berendsohn AG
- Company type: Aktiengesellschaft
- Industry: promotional products
- Founded: 1833, 1948
- Headquarters: Hamburg, Germany
- Products: promotional products
- Revenue: approx. € 80 million annually
- Number of employees: approx. 850
- Website: www.berendsohn.com

Berendsohn AG is a company active on the promotional products market with its headquarters in Hamburg and markets in 14 European states. According to the company, the annual turnover amounts to approx. EUR 80 million. Berendsohn AG maintains business relationships with more than 100,000 clients. The company exclusively sells its products b2b. There are no business relationships to private end-users. The majority of clients originates from small and medium-sized enterprises. Approximately 850 employees work for Berendsohn. The products are refined in three company-owned production centres, namely Hamburg, Brüsewitz and Milan.

== History ==
The company was founded in 1833 as publishing house „B. S. Berendsohn“ by Bernhard Salomon Berendsohn. In the second half of the 19th century they sold mostly premium-quality copperplate engravings showing views of the city (so-called „Hamburgensien“). After World War II, holocaust-survivor Günther Berendsohn (11 January 1916 – 20 September 1992; arrested 1944 – 1945 in the KZ Buchenwald) refounded the company. From then on they sold advertising material. The businessman extended the company from a one-man-business to a company with 50 employees and an annual turnover of 5 million DM. In the course of the company's expansion, in 1964 new markets in France, Italy, Norway, Austria, Sweden, and Switzerland where created. In the years before 2008, they created new markets in Denmark, Belgium, Luxemburg, the Netherlands, Poland, Slovenia, and Spain. 2007 the company extended its business segment into the sale of staff clothes.

== Design Awards ==
Since 1999, Berendsohn AG has been awarded a number of international prizes for its products. The IMPULS corkscrew received the iF Design Award in 1999. The following year, the key-ring BLUE POINT received the red dot design award. The combined salt and pepper mill SALZ & PFEFFER and the champagne bottle top FOCUS won the iF Design Award in 2002. The latter also received the red dot design award of that year. In 2004, the vase ICE AZURE also received the red dot design award. Design award winners of recent years are the candelabrum LICHTSTRECKE (2005), the massage device Dr. FEEL GOOD (2006) as well as the decanter VINO and the combined salt and pepper mill SIEGER (2007). They all received the iF Design Awards.
