= Promotional Products Association International =

American trade association

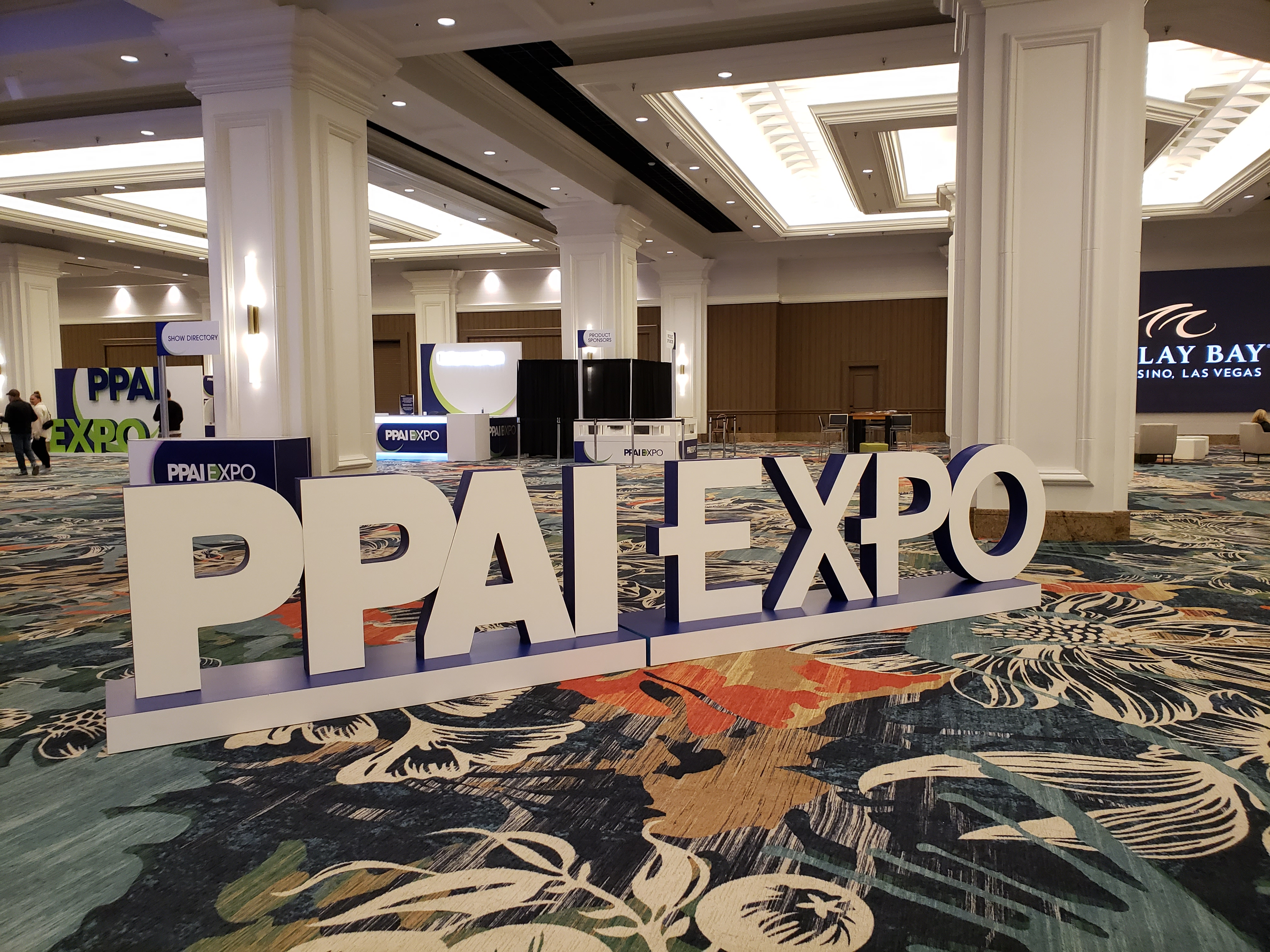
- Formation: 1903; 123 years ago
- Type: not-for-profit membership organization
- Headquarters: Irving, Texas, United States
- Region served: Worldwide
- Members: 14,000 members
- Official language: English
- President and CEO: Drew Holmgreen
- Website: www.ppai.org
- Formerly called: Specialty Association Advertising International

Promotional Products Association International (PPAI) is an international not-for-profit trade association serving the promotional products industry. The association was founded in 1903 and presently has more than 14,000 members.

== History ==
In 1903, a group of 12 manufacturers of promotional products formed an industry trade association. The organization was initially called the National Association of Advertising Novelty Manufacturers. Its initial members discussed matters such as pricing, innovation, business setbacks, and managing sales representatives, and established bylaws and operating procedures for the organization. Benjamin S. Whitehead, who owned a promotional products manufacturing company in Newark, New Jersey, became the association's first president.

By 1906, the association had 56 members, including one honorary member, Henry S. Bunting, who published the official publication of the association. Mr. Bunting's publication and book on promotional products and their impact on business expansion had contributed to the recognition of the industry.

In 1914, trade shows became a part of the association's conventions, with 32 exhibitors present at the first event. In 1928, PPAI celebrated its 25th anniversary with more than 132 members. The association's milestones in its first 25 years includes standardization of terms and trade practices and establishing advertising specialties as a recognized advertising medium.

The industry faced challenges during the great depression, but business rebounded in the late 1940s with industry sales of $124 million recorded in 1947. In 1961, the association started offering executive development seminars and continued to provide educational opportunities to assist members in improving their businesses.

In 1966, PPAI had 1,211 members and more than 300 exhibitors. In 2020, PPAI membership reached approximately 15,000. The PPAI Expo, held annually in Las Vegas, is a trade show for promotional-products professionals and companies.

== See also ==
- Advertising Specialty Institute
- Promotional merchandise
