= Todo O Nada =

Studio album by Benny Ibarra
- Released: May 2001
- Recorded: 2000
- Genre: Latin Pop
- Label: WEA Latina

Benny Ibarra chronology
Om (1996)	Todo O Nada (2001)	Grandes Exitos: 1992-2002 (2002)

Singles from Todo O Nada
- 1. "Uno"; 2. "Inspiración"; 3. "Todo O Nada"; 4. "Hiéreme"

Todo O Nada is a 2001 album by Mexican singer Benny Ibarra. The album features collaborations with Erik Rubin, Alix, Dougie Bowne, musicians from Café Tacuba, and Alex González from the Mexican Rock band Maná.

The first single, "Uno", was top of the charts for eight weeks, became a gold record in two weeks and later went to Platinum. The second single was "Inspiración", which was also used in the soundtrack of the film of the same name.

== Track listing ==
1. "Uno" ( L: Alix Bauer M: Benny) –
2. "Hiéreme (L: Ruy García M:Benny, Dougie Borne, Vico Gutiérrez)" –
3. "Por Tu Amor" (L: Vico M:Benny, Dougie Borne, Vico Gutiérrez ) –
4. "Vuelo" (L: Ruy García M:Benny, Dougie Borne, Vico Gutiérrez) –
5. "María" ( L: Benny M: Billy Mendez, Memo Mendez Guiu, Benny)-
6. "Una Palabra" (L: Ruy García M:Benny, Dougie Borne, Vico Gutiérrez) –
7. "Todo O Nada" (L: Ruy García M: Benny) –
8. "Unico" (L: Memo Mendez Guiu M: Memo Mendez Guiu, Benny) –
9. "Fuego" (L: Ruy García M:Benny, Dougie Borne, Vico Gutiérrez) –
10. "Aire " (L: Ruy García M:Benny, Dougie Borne, Vico Gutiérrez )–
11. "Inspiración" (Memo Mendez Guiu) –
