= Renata Notni =

Mexican actress

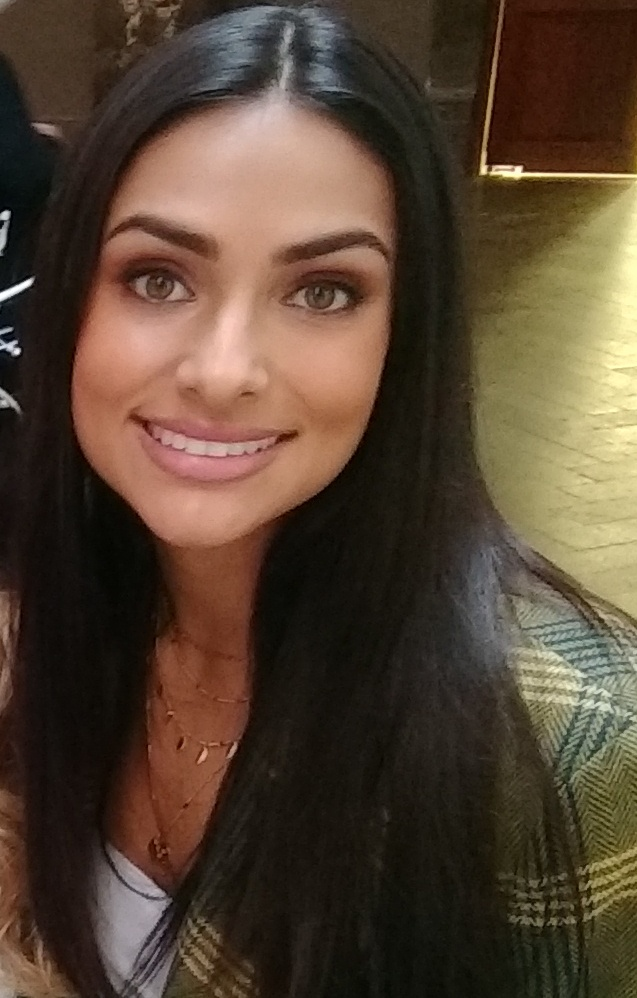
- Notni in 2020
- Born: Renata Martínez Notni; January 2, 1995 (age 31); Cuernavaca, Morelos, Mexico
- Occupation: Actress
- Years active: 2006–present
- Partner: Diego Boneta

Renata Martínez Notni (born January 2, 1995, in Cuernavaca, Morelos) is a Mexican actress.

== Early life ==
Notni was born in Cuernavaca, Morelos. As a child, she attended acting lessons at CEA Infantil, the children's version of drama school, Centro de Educación Artística, run by Televisa in Mexico City.

== Career ==
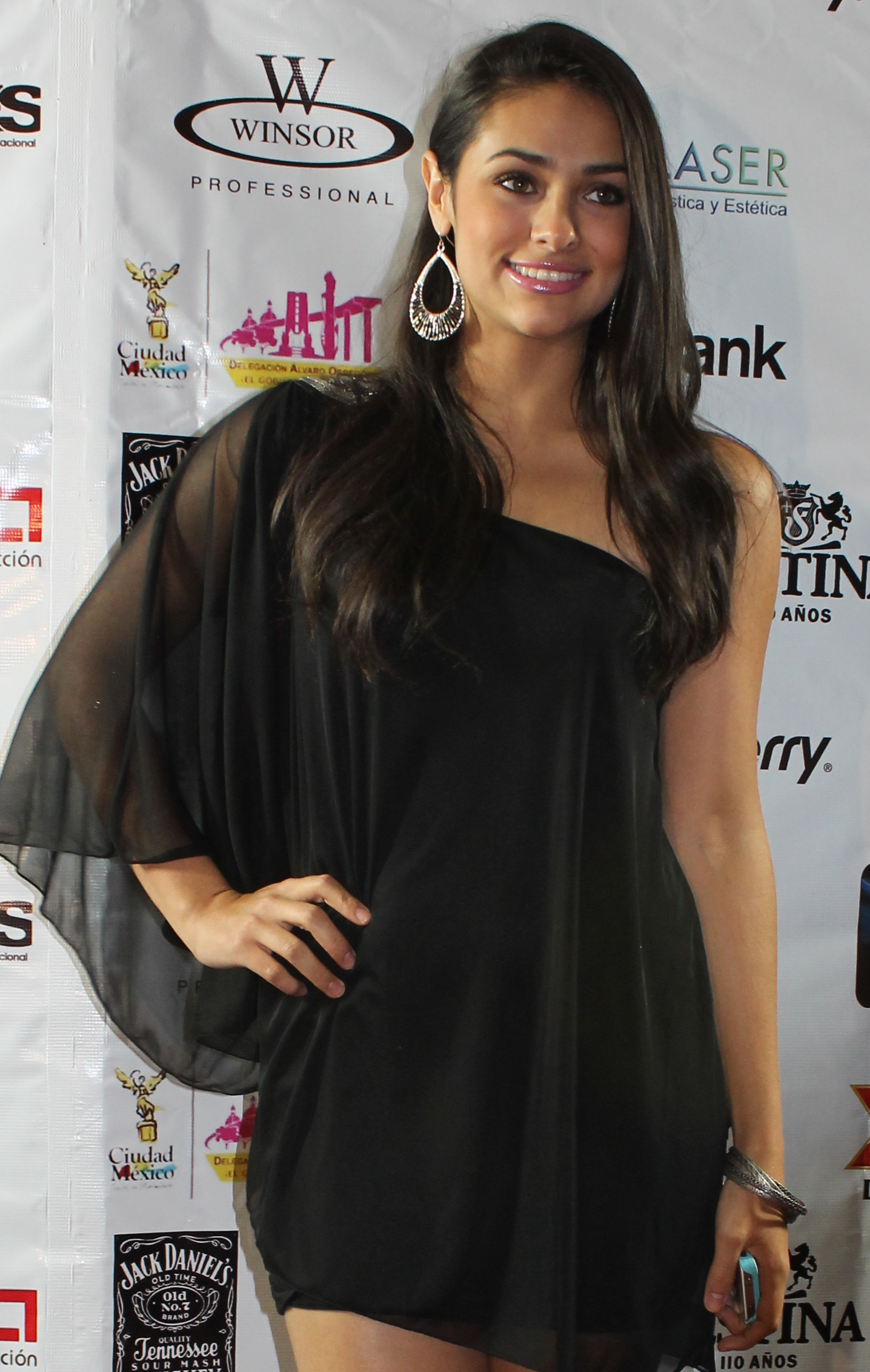
Notni in 2012

Notni made her acting debut in the 2006 telenovela, Código Postal, when she was 10 years old. Since then, she has had roles in eight telenovelas including Mar de amor and Amorcito Corazón. She has also participated in the Mexican television series, La rosa de Guadalupe and Como dice el dicho. In 2014, she briefly relocated to New York City and enrolled in an acting course at Stella Adler Acting Studio. In November 2014, she travel to Madrid to film, Yo quisiera, a youth-oriented television series, serving as her first acting role outside of Mexico. She received word that she had been cast as the lead in Televisa's upcoming telenovela, Amor de barrio, shortly after finishing her acting class. Her participation in the telenovela was official confirmed in March 2015. The part was Notni's first starring role. Amor de barrio aired weekdays on Canal de las Estrellas beginning June 4, 2015. The telenovela's finale aired on November 8, 2015.

Following the conclusion of Amor de barrio, Notni was cast in a role in the psychological thriller play, Las que no sienten. The play premiered in November 2015 in at Teatro en Corto in Mexico City on November 5, 2015. It ran until December 15, 2015. On November 18, 2015, she attended an open casting call for a role in producer Juan Osorio's telenovela, Sueño de amor. On November 26, 2015, Notni was confirmed for one of the lead youth roles in the telenovela. Filming began in late December 2015, and the telenovela premiered in Mexico on February 22, 2016. It premiered in the U.S on Univision on March 8, 2016.

In 2017 she was the main role at the series Mi adorable maldición (English: My Sweet Curse). She played part as Aurora a girl showered by misfortunes and everybody used to believe she was cursed.

== Personal life ==
Notni resides in Mexico City. She is fluent in English. She was in a relationship with actor Diego Boneta from 2021 to 2026..

== Filmography ==
=== Film ===
List of films and roles
Title	Year	Role	Ref.
Grandma's Wedding	2019	Julieta	
Grumpy Christmas	2021		
¿Qué culpa tiene el Karma?	2022	Lucy	
Malcriados	2023	Camila	

=== Television ===
List of television appearances and roles
Title	Year	Role	Notes
Código Postal	2006–2007	Andrea Garza Durán	Television debut; 200 episodes
La rosa de Guadalupe	2008–2010	Various	4 episodes
Un gancho al corazón	2008–2009	Luisa Hernández / Luisa Sermeño Lerdo de Tejada	Supporting role; 13 episodes
Mar de amor	2009–2010	Carmen "Carmita" Bracho	Supporting role; 100 episodes
La fuerza del destino	2011	Lucía Lomelí Curiel (young)	8 episodes
Como dice el dicho	2011	Sofía	Episode: "Nadie sabe lo que tiene"
Amorcito corazón	2011	María Soledad "Marisol" Lobo Ballesteros	Supporting role; 205 episodes
Qué bonito amor	2012–2013	Paloma Mendoza García	Supporting role; 133 episodes
Quiero amarte	2013–2014	Mariana Valdez Morales	Supporting role; 153 episodes
Amor de barrio	2015	Paloma Madrigal	Main role; 110 episodes
Yo quisiera	2015–2016	Camila	48 episodes
Sueño de amor	2016	Patricia Guerrero	Main role; 132 episodes
Mi adorable maldición	2017	Aurora Sánchez	Main role; 121 episodes
Érase una vez	2017	Blanca Valle	Episode: "Blanca Nieves"
Por amar sin ley	2018	Sol	Special guest star; 4 episodes
Vecinos	2019	Guadalupe	Episode: "Telenovela"
El Dragón: Return of a Warrior	2019–2020	Adela Cruz	Main role; 81 episodes
La venganza de las Juanas	2021	Juana Valentina	Main role; 18 episodes
Zorro	2024	Lolita Márquez	Main role; 10 episodes
Day One	2026	Biran	Main role; 6 episodes

=== Theatre ===
Title	Year	Role
Las que no sienten	2015	Marcela

=== Music videos ===
Title	Year	Artist
"Eso No Va a Suceder"	2018	Ha*Ash
"Pendejo"	2021	Enrique Iglesias

== Awards and nominations ==
Premios TVyNovelas

Year	Category	Nominated work	Result
2011	Best Young Lead Actress	Mar de amor	Nominated
2017	Best Young Lead Actress	Sueño de amor	Won

Kid Choice Awards Mexico

Year	Category	Nominated work	Result
2017	Best Actress	Mi adorable maldición	Nominated

== See also ==
- List of people from Morelos
