= Un padre no tan padre =

- Directed by: Raúl Martínez
- Written by: Alberto Bremer
- Starring: Héctor Bonilla; Benny Ibarra; Jacqueline Bracamontes
- Cinematography: Alejandro Martínez
- Edited by: Adrián Parisi
- Music by: Benny Ibarra
- Distributed by: Pantelion Films; Cinépolis Distribución
- Release date: 21 December 2016 (Mexico)
- Country: Mexico
- Language: Spanish

Un padre no tan padre is a 2016 Mexican comedy film directed by Raúl Martínez, from a screenplay by Alberto Bremer. The film stars Héctor Bonilla, Benny Ibarra, and Jaqueline Bracamontes. It premiered on 21 December 2016, and the plot revolves around Don Servando (Bonilla), a bitter 85-year-old man who has been evicted from the nursing home where he lived; So he is forced to move in with his son Francisco (Ibarra) and his friends. It was followed by a sequel, Grumpy Christmas, in 2021.

== Cast ==
- Héctor Bonilla as Don Servando
- Benny Ibarra as Francisco
- Jacqueline Bracamontes as Alma
- Arturo Barba as Bill
- Natália Subtil as Gio

== Awards and nominations ==
Year	Award	Category	Work	Result	Ref
2017	Diosas de Plata	Best Newcomer – Male	Sergio Mayer Mori	Nominated	
2017	Diosas de Plata	Best Original Song	Benny Ibarra	Nominated	
