= Asian Social Institute =

Private college in Manila, Philippines

- Motto: "Prosperity through Justice"
- Motto in English: An Asian Graduate School with a Difference
- Type: Private, graduate school, non-sectarian
- Established: 1962
- President: Mina M. Ramirez
- Location: Manila, Philippines; 14°34′39″N 120°59′19″E
- Website: asinet-online.org
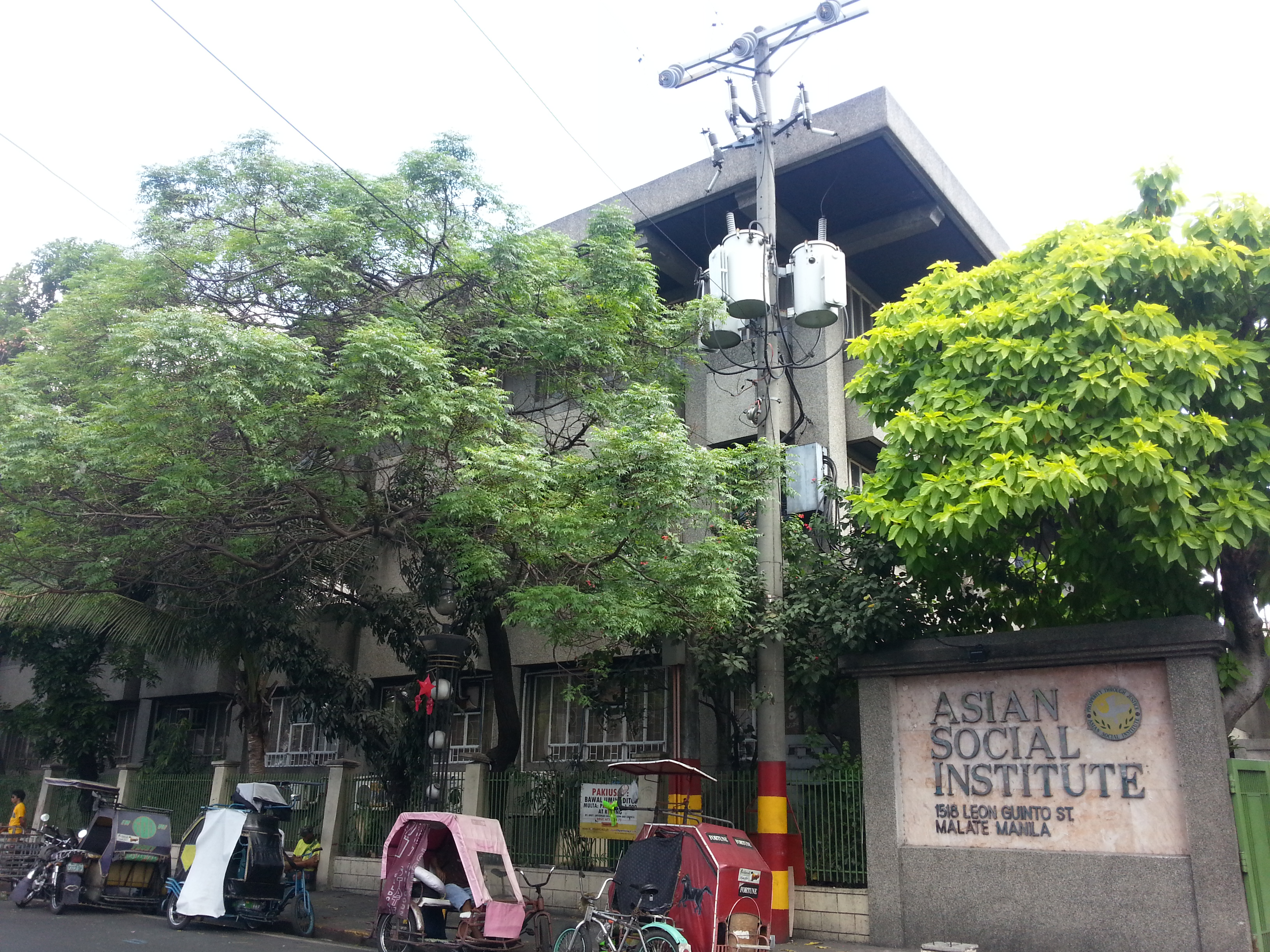

- Location in Manila Location in Metro Manila Location in Luzon Location in the Philippines

The Asian Social Institute (ASI) is a graduate school and research institution in Manila, Philippines. It is one of the few graduate institutes specializing in economics, Anthropology, sociology, social work and social services and development in the country.

== Background ==
Asian Social Institute (ASI), a Manila-based Graduate School of Social Transformative Praxis was established in 1962 by a Dutch Catholic Missionary of the Congregation of the Immaculate Heart of Mary (CICM), Francis Senden.

With the blessings of Cardinal Rufino Santos of the Archdiocese of Manila, the ASI's purpose is to form and train social science-based social development managers for Asia and the Pacific, thereby implementing the social teachings of the Catholic Church.

Since the death of its founder in 1973, ASI has provided a learning environment which is structured in two departments – Academe-Research, and Social Development. On top of these two departments is the President's Office to whom the Communication and Publication, MIS, Promotions and Public Relations, and administrative units report. The president of ASI is Mina M. Ramirez. Academe-Research is headed by the vice president for Academe-Research and academic dean, Prisinia C. Arcinue. The vice president of the Social Development Department is Dennis Batoy.

The Academe-Research integrates theory and practice, while the Social Development Department grounds the students' learning in marginal communities through ASI's Action Subsidiaries – Family Center, Urban Community Desk, Tent School, Diocesan Accompaniment, Youth Accompaniment, ASI Enterprise Center and its NGO networks. ASI's Communication and Publication activities provide for approaches to communicating ideas.
