= Así =

Studio album by Benny Ibarra
- Released: 2005
- Recorded: 2005
- Genre: Pop
- Label: WEA Latina
- Producer: Benny, Vico, Chetes, Santiago Ojeda, Memo Mendez Guiu

Benny Ibarra chronology
Llueve Luz (2003)	Así (2005)	Estoy (2006)

Así is the fifth studio album by Mexican singer Benny Ibarra, in which he worked with different musicians such as Erik Rubin. It was certified Gold in the first week. The singles were "Cada Paso" and "Dejalo Ir". A limited edition contained a DVD with the videoclip of "Cada Paso", behind the scenes and making of the album.

== Track listing ==
1. "Canción Pop" (Benny Ibarra)
2. "A Veces" (Chetes)
3. "Cada Paso" (L:Paulyna Carraz M: Emil Billy Mendez)
4. "Tu Voz" (L: Nuria Domenech M: Santiago Ojeda)
5. "Déjalo Ir" (L: Ruy García M:Vico, Eric Rubin)
6. "Te Me Escapas"(Benny Ibarra)
7. "Tal Vez" (Benny Ibarra)
8. "Así" (L: Memo Mendez Guiu, M: Memo Mendez, Valeria González Camarena)
9. "Detrás de Ti" (L: Bernardo Ibarra Sánchez, Urdus, Vico M: Benny, Eric Rubin)
10. "No me Hace Bien”(Memo Mendez Guiu)
11. "Algo Sigue Vivo Aquí (L: Ruy García M: Vico, Benny)
12. "No Demos Paso Atrás" (L: Ruy García M: Benny)
13. "Donde Nace el Sol" (L: Benny M: Benny, Memo Mendez Guiu)

=== DVD ===
1. "Detrás del Album"
2. "Cada Paso" (Video)
3. "Extras"
