= Benny Ibarra =

Mexican singer

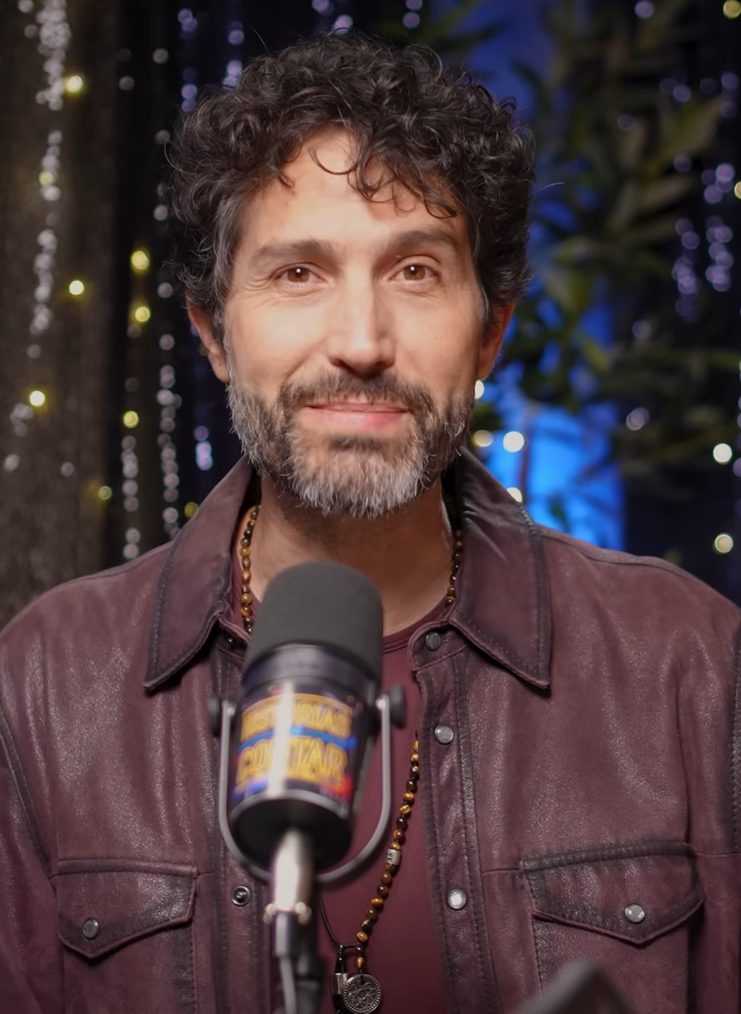
- Ibarra in 2025

Background information
- Born: Benny Ibarra de Llano; September 8, 1970 (age 56)
- Origin: Mexico City, Mexico
- Genres: Latin Pop; Mexican pop; Alternative rock
- Years active: 1981–present
- Labels: Warner Music; EMI Music
- Formerly of: Timbiriche
- Website: www.benny.tv archived

Benny Ibarra de Llano (born September 8, 1970) is a Mexican singer, musician, producer and actor. He was born into a family of artists. His mother, Julissa, was a singer and actress in the 1960s; and his father, Benny, an actor and 1960s rock singer in the Mexican band Los Yaki. His brother, Alejandro Ibarra, is a singer and actor.

Ibarra started his music career in the pop band Timbiriche (1981), and began working as a solo artist in 1992. He reunited with Timbiriche for the 1999 Reunion and again for the 25th Anniversary Tour in 2007- 2008. Between 2012-2016 he was part of the trio Sasha, Benny y Erik, along with two other former members of the Mexican pop group Timbiriche, Sasha Sokol and Erik Rubin. In 2017, Benny joined the original founding members of Timbiriche to celebrate the 35th anniversary of the group.

== Pre-solo career ==
As part of Timbiriche, he recorded 7 albums. He also starred in Vaselina (Grease). Ibarra left Timbiriche in 1986, and from 1985 to 1989 he studied jazz, guitar, classical music, and composition at the Walnut Hill School in Boston. In 1998, Timbiriche reunited to tour Mexico and Central America, and in 1999 released a live album El Concierto. Ibarra recorded the album Mar Adentro en la Sangre with Guadalajara-based progressive rock band Santa Sabina the same year.

== Solo discography ==
- 1992 Hablame Como La Lluvia
  - The first album includes the singles Dame un Poco de tu Amor and Tonto Corazón.
- 1994 El Tiempo
  - The second album went platinum and included the hits Sin Tí, Cielo and Mía. All of them became number one hits in Latin America.
- 1996 Om
  - On this third album, Benny wrote more songs about himself, but it was not the commercial success of its predecessor. The singles were Cada Mañana, Mas de Tí and Sutil Dolor.
- 2001 Todo O Nada
  - After a five-year absence, this album featured collaborations with Erik Rubin, Alix Bauer, Dougie Bowne and musicians from Café Tacuba and Alex González from the Mexican Rock band Maná. The first single Uno was top of the charts for eight weeks, became a gold record in two weeks and later went to platinum. the second single was Inspiraciòn, also included in the film soundtrack of same name.
- 2002 Grandes Exitos: 1992-2002
  - His first Greatest Hits release included a new single Irremediable from the film soundtrack La Habitación Azul, a duet with Edith Màrquez entitled La Otra, a new version of Cielo, live tracks and his chart hits. A limited edition CD included a DVD with 9 video clips. The first edition included Como un Ángel and the second Cielo 2002. The compilation became a gold record.
- 2003 Llueve Luz
  - This album went gold and was made with Chetes and Miguel Bosé, among others. Miguel Bosé sings on the second single Si Puedo Volverte a ver. The other singles were Llueve Luz and Vives en Mì.
- 2003 Cielo
  - A "best of" compilation for the US market.
- 2005 Así
  - His most recent album in the studio went gold in 48 hours and includes the singles Cada Paso and Dejalo Ir. A limited edition includes a digipack with DVD bonus with the music video of Cada Paso, and extras such as the making of the record.
- 2006 Estoy
  - A live album recorded in the Auditorio Nacional during November 2005, which includes "Tonto Corazòn" and a new track, "Siempre Mas", and other live songs from 1996 and 2002.
- 2006 Sus Baladas
- 2010 La Marcha de la Vida
  - Includes the hit song "Calaveras" featuring Mexican/American singer songwriter Lila Downs and the first single "Perder Para Encontrar". In 2011, it was reissued with new songs and a DVD with videos and a documentary.

=== Music DVD ===
- 2003 En Vivo
  - The DVD captures his first Auditorio Nacional show in 2002, though the concert is not complete. Included are features on his father, Moderatto, Erik Rubin and Alix Bauer
- 2006 Estoy
  - This DVD captures his 2005 concert in Auditorio Nacional, and also includes two videos, "Tonto Corazon 2006" and "Siempre Mas".

== Filmography ==
Films
Year	Movie	Character	Note
1991	She-Bat	Hawk	
1991	Ciudad de ciegos		
2006	Amor xtremo		
2011	Hop	E.B.	Spanish Voice
2016	Sing!	Buster Moon	Spanish Voice
2016	Un padre no tan padre	Francisco "Fran" Villegas	
2020	Trolls World Tour	Branch	Spanish Voice
2021	Sing 2	Buster Moon	Spanish Voice

Telenovelas
Year	Telenovela	Character	Note
2004	Amarte es mi pecado	Benny	Episode 17
2006	La fea más bella	Benny	
2009	Atrévete a soñar	Amado Cuevas	

Series
Year	TV Series	Character
1986	¡¡Cachún Cachún Ra Ra!!	
1987	Papá soltero	
2007-2008	S.O.S.: Sexo y otros secretos	Gabriel

Theater
Year	Title	Note
1981	Las maravillas de crecer	
1984	Vaselina con Timbiriche	Centro Cultural Telmex
1987	Godspell	Teatro de los Insurgentes
1998	Hermanos de Sangre	Lalo at Teatro de los Insurgentes
2016	El hombre de La Mancha	Don Quijote at Teatro de los Insurgentes
2019	Novecento	Tim Tooney at Teatro Milán

== See also ==
- Sasha, Benny y Erik
