= Applied Spectral Imaging =

- Industry: Biomedical digital diagnostics
- Founded: 1993; 32 years ago
- Headquarters: Carlsbad, California, United States
- Area served: World-wide
- Key people: Limor Shiposh (CEO)
- Products: HiPath Pro; PathFusion; HiBand; HiFISH; CytoPower; Rainbow
- Website: spectral-imaging.com

Applied Spectral Imaging or ASI is a multinational biomedical company that develops and manufactures microscopy imaging and digital analysis tools for hospitals, service laboratories and research centers. The company provides cytogenetic, pathology, and research laboratories with bright-field, fluorescence and spectral imaging in clinical applications. Test slides can be scanned, captured, archived, reviewed on the screen, analyzed with computer-assisted algorithms, and reported. ASI system platforms automate the workflow process to reduce human error in the identification and classification of chromosomal disorders, genome instability, various oncological malignancies, among other diseases.

== History ==
Founded in 1993, ASI initially focused on spectral imaging devices for the research community.

In 2002, ASI made a strategic move to expand into the clinical cytogenetics market and thereby, introduced its CytoLabView system for karyotyping and FISH imaging.

In 2005, ASI launched its automated scanning system in order to increase throughput for case analysis, compensating for higher sample volumes and helping laboratories to better cope with a deficit of laboratory technicians and other professions. As the demand increased for more diagnostics, ASI focused on providing faster imaging and analysis to improve turn-around-time for patient results. Scanning automation and algorithms enabled laboratory technologists to spend more time on results and analysis rather than manual labor.

In 2011, ASI launched a proprietary software platform named GenASIs. The software automates the diagnostic manual process. Physicians, medical scientists and laboratory technicians integrate digital technology to manage the visualization of the slide and compute the analysis. Through algorithms, tissue suspension cell and chromosomes are analyzed for aberrations, cell classification, tumor proportion score etc. ASI's high throughput tray loader, introduced the same year, was manufactured to automate the sample and scanning process.

In 2017, ASI introduced PathFusion and HiPath Pro- the company's full pathology imaging suite for H&E, IHC, and FISH visualization and analysis software including tissue matching and whole slide imaging.

=== FDA Clearances ===
ASI has a wide FDA cleared portfolio. Its products and Quality System (QS) are compliant with IVD medical Device Standards and Regulations.

- 2001: FDA cleared for BandView product
- 2005: FDA cleared for FISHView product
- 2007: FDA cleared for SpotScan application for CEP XY
- 2010: FDA cleared for SpotScan application for HER2/neu
- 2011: FDA cleared for SpotScan application for UroVysion
- 2013: FDA cleared for SpotsScan application for ALK
- 2015: FDA cleared for HiPath system for IHC family HER2, ER, PR and Ki67

=== Patents ===
ASI patents cover methods and instrumentation for general fields in the life sciences. Some of the claims are specific to a special type of hardware. Others have a more general scope and refer to the application rather than the instrument. Some of the original patents are related to spectral imaging systems based on interferometry and other spectral imaging instrumentation.

== Functionalities ==
The functionalities that Applied Spectral Imaging provides laboratories and hospitals include automated slide scanning, applications interface, whole slide imaging, scoring and analysis, sharing capabilities for team review and final sign off, database management, secure archiving of reports, connectivity to the LIS and standardized testing.

=== Clinical applications ===
ASI's clinical applications for laboratories include the scoring of chromosome analysis and karyotyping, fluorescent karyotyping, spectral karyotyping, karyotyping of multiple species, scanning and detection of metaphases and interphases, FISH review and analysis, matching of tissue FISH with H&E/ IHC, Brightfield whole slide imaging, IHC quantitative scoring, Cytokinesis-blocked micronucleus, region of interest annotating and measuring, tissue matching and FISH imaging, analysis and documentation of membrane IHC stain, analysis and documentation of nuclear IHC stain, chromosome comparison modules, Whole Slide Image viewing, enhancement and documentation, data case management and network connectivity of multiple systems in a network.

=== Products ===
- ASI HiPath Pro - Brightfield imaging analysis system for a variety of histopathology needs, including IHC scoring and Whole Slide Imaging of H&E and IHC samples.
- ASI PathFusion - Bridges the gap between Brightfield pathology and FISH. Combines Whole Slide Imaging, computational Tissue FISH and digital tissue matching of FISH with Haemotoxylin and Eosin (H&E) or Immunohistochemistry (IHC) samples.
- ASI HiBand - Digital chromosome analysis for counting, indexing and karyotyping.
- ASI HiFISH - Computational FISH diagnostics for classification, scanning and imaging analysis.
- ASI CytoPower - Complete chromosomes' analysis, Karyotyping and FISH cell classification platform.
- ASI Rainbow - Analysis & multicolor imaging solution for Fluorescence and Brightfield samples
