= Promotional merchandise =

Products distributed to promote a brand

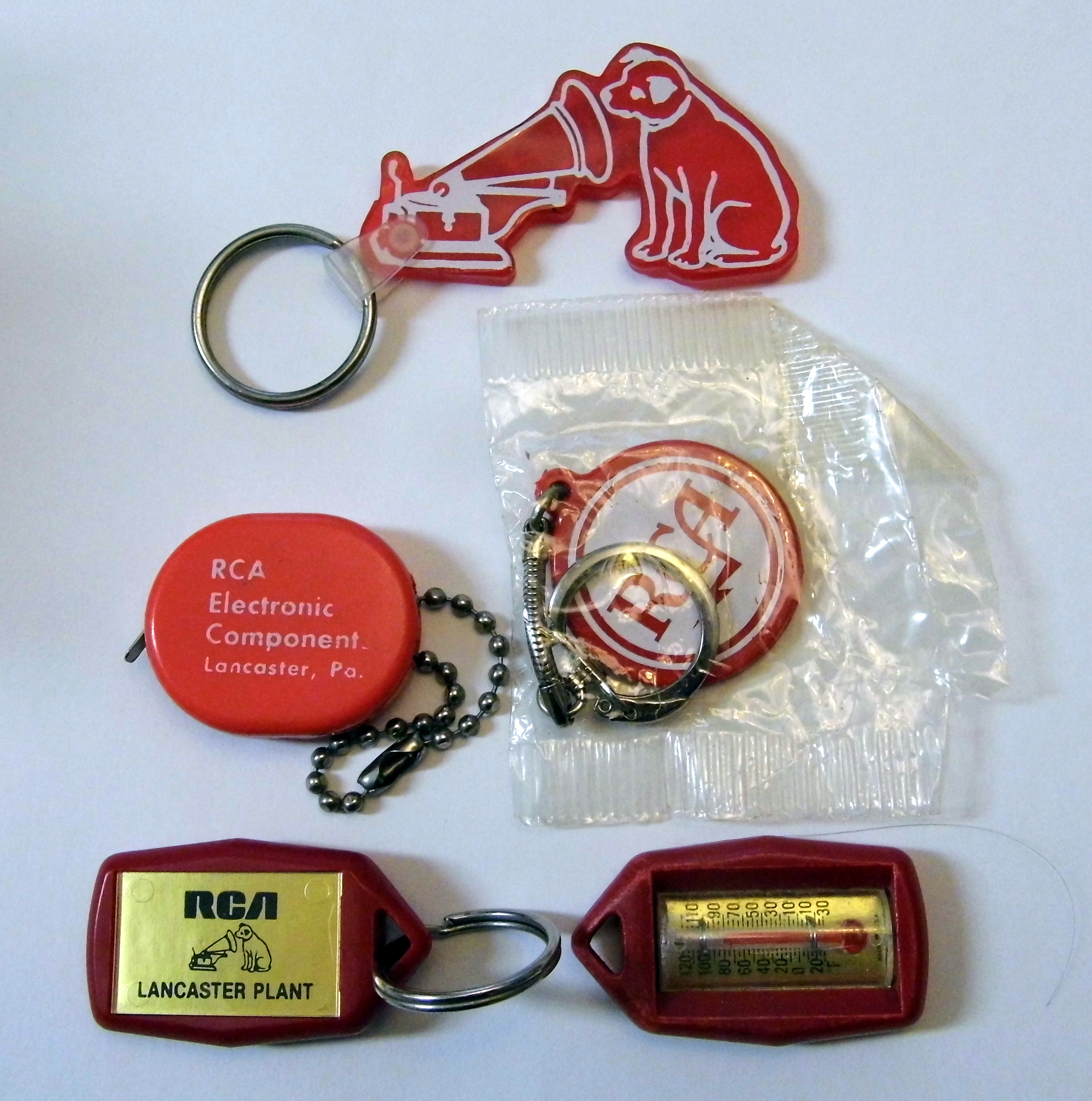
Promotional RCA key fobs

Promotional merchandise are products branded with a logo or slogan and distributed at little or no cost to promote a brand, corporate identity, or event. Such products, which are often informally called promo products, swag (mass nouns), or freebies (count nouns), are used in marketing and sales. Often they are of the tchotchke type. They are given away or sold at a loss to promote a company, corporate image, brand, or event. They are often distributed as handouts at trade shows, at conferences, on sales calls (that is, visits to companies that are purchasing or might purchase), and as bonus items in shipped orders. They are often used in guerrilla marketing campaigns. Ones for video games are often called feelies.

== History ==
The first known promotional products in the United States were commemorative buttons dating back to the election of George Washington in 1789. During the early 19th century, there were some advertising calendars, rulers, and wooden specialties, but there was no organized industry for the creation and distribution of promotional items until later in the 19th century.

Jasper Meek, a printer in Coshocton, Ohio, is considered by many to be the originator of the industry when he convinced a local shoe store to supply book bags imprinted with the store name to local schools. Henry Beach, another Coshocton printer and a competitor of Meek, picked up on the idea, and soon the two men were selling and printing marble bags, buggy whips, card cases, hand fans, calendars, cloth caps, aprons, and even hats for horses.

In 1904, 12 manufacturers of promotional items got together to found the first trade association for the industry. That organization is now known as the Promotional Products Association International or PPAI, which currently has more than 10,000 global members. PPAI represents the promotional products industry of more than 22,000 distributors and approximately 4,800 manufacturers.

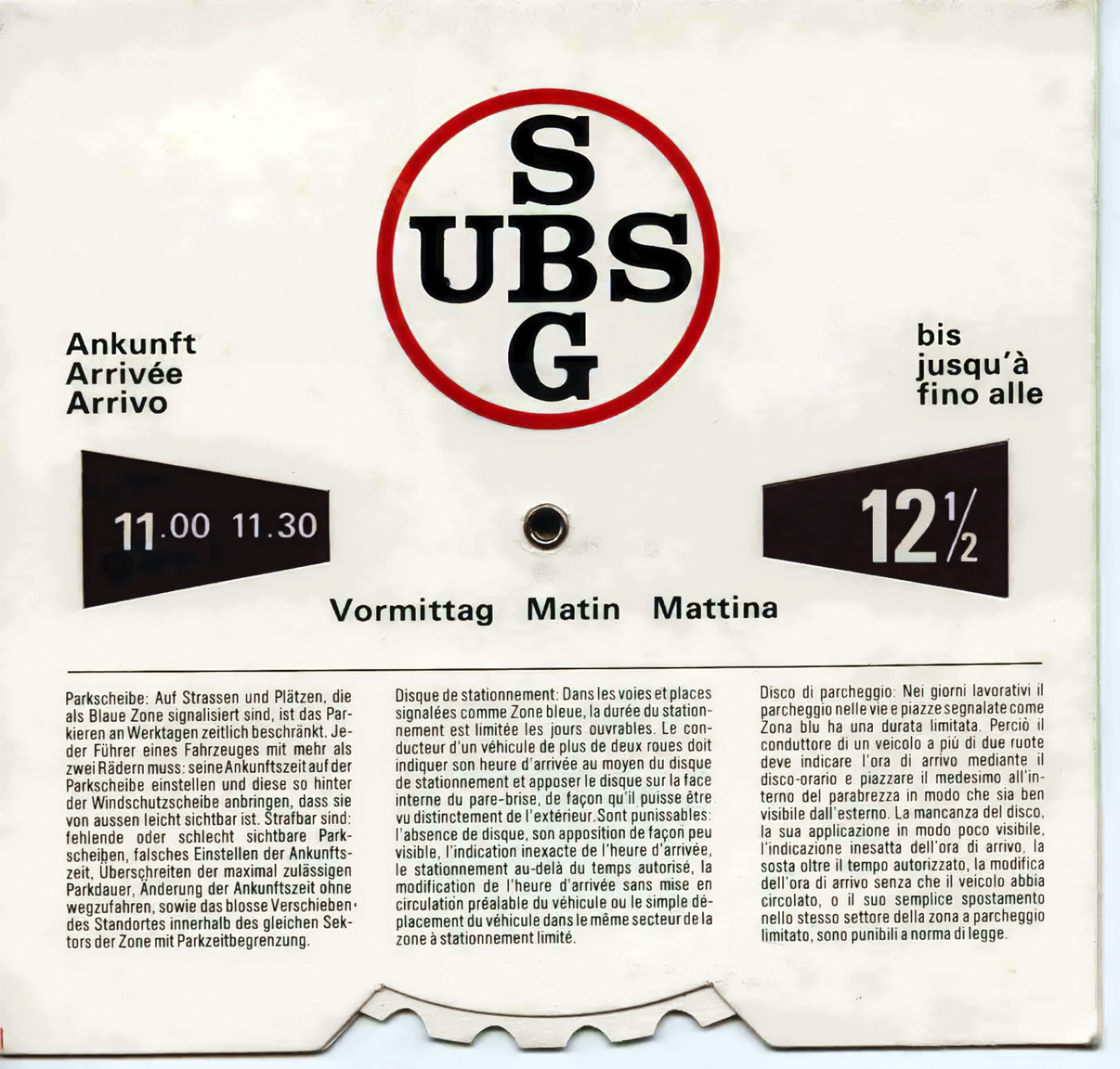
Swiss parking disk (early 1970s). Selected arrival time shows at the left window, departure at the right. Other side of disk is used for afternoon parking. Disk was a sales promotion for UBS bank.

The UK and Ireland promotional merchandise industry formally emerged as corporate marketing became more sophisticated during the late 1950s. Before this, companies may have provided occasional gifts, but there was no recognised promotional merchandise industry. The real explosion in the growth of the promotional merchandise industry took place in the 1970s. At this time an ever-increasing number of corporate companies recognised the benefits gained from promoting their corporate identity, brand or product, with the use of gifts featuring their own logo. In the early years, the range of products available was limited.

Giorgio Armani is credited as being the first fashion brand designer who offered clothes to celebrated people and public figures. This did not prevent the brand from promoting Armani suits in popular films and thereby bringing designer clothing to a broader consumer audience. In the early 1980s demand grew from distributors for a generic promotional product catalogue they could brand as their own and then leave with to their corporate customers. In later years, these catalogues could be over-branded to reflect a distributor's corporate image. Distributors could then give them to their end user customers as their own. In the early years, promotional merchandise catalogues were very much sales tools and customers would buy the products offered on the pages.

In the 1990s, new catalogue services emerged for distributors from various sources. The nineties also saw the emergence of ‘catalogue groups’ - groups that offered a unique catalogue to a limited geographical group of promotional merchandise distributor companies. Membership in a Catalogue Group could also offer improved buying terms, a network of fellow distributor companies, and provide other support services. Examples of catalogue groups include Trade Only Spectrum Catalogue, Page Group and the Envoy Group, offering discounted products to a select group of distributors who have all been in the industry for over three years. Members of the Envoy Group have regional exclusivity as one of their perks providing some protection to the low entry barrier of the market

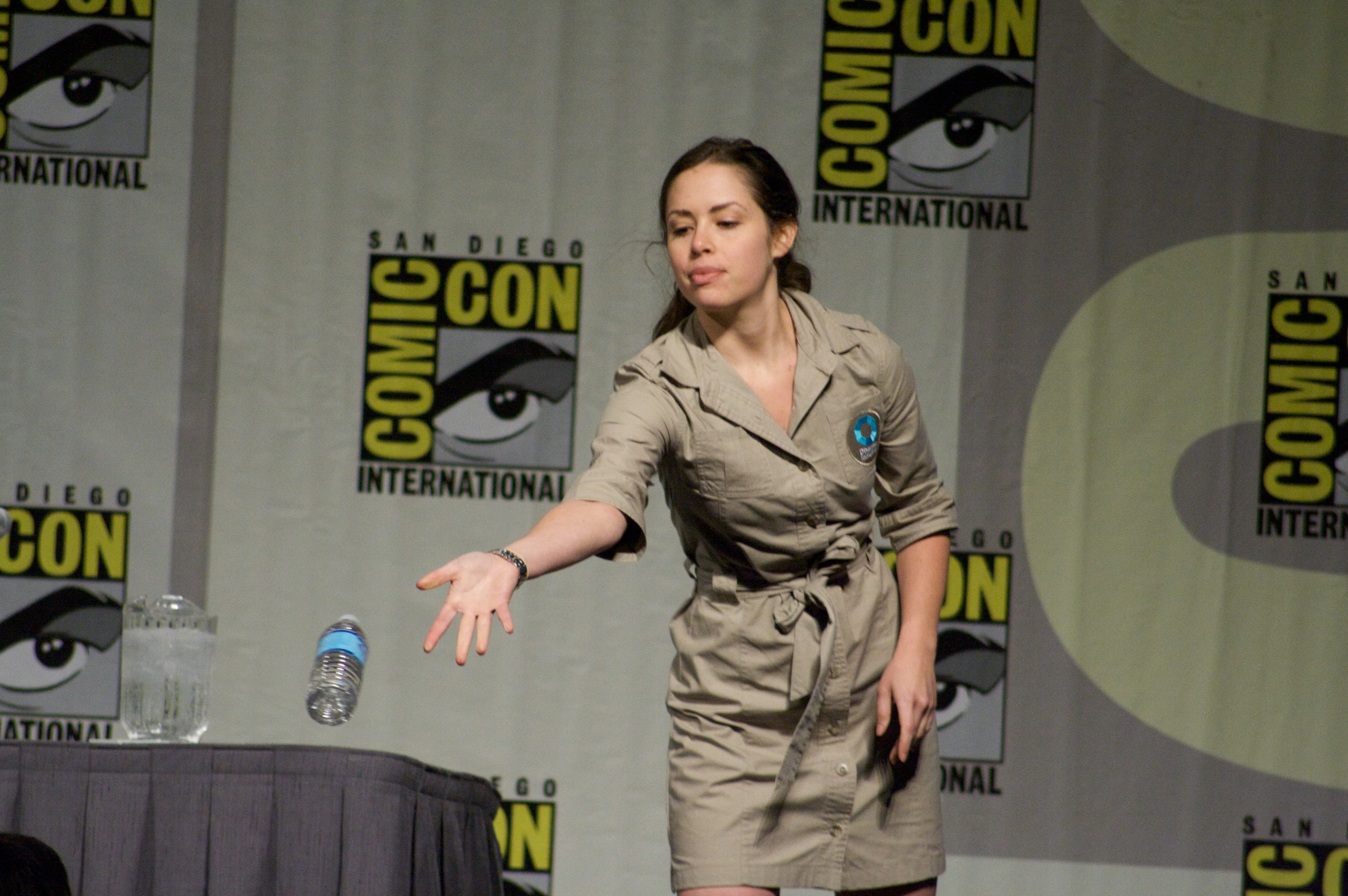
A woman dressed as a member of the fictional Dharma Initiative from TV series Lost throws a water bottle branded with the series' Oceanic Airlines logo to attendees at a 2008 convention.

Before the 1990s, the industry had a peak season in which the majority of promotional products were sold. The season featured around Christmas and the giving of gifts. This changed significantly in the early 1990s as Christmas gifts became less appropriate in a multicultural society. Companies were also becoming more inventive in their marketing and were now using promotional merchandise throughout the year to support the promotion of brands, products and events. In the early 21st century the role of a promotional merchandise catalogue started to change, as it could no longer fully represent the vast range of products in the market place. By 2007, catalogues were being mailed to targeted customer lists, rather than the blanket postal mailings that had taken place before. The catalogue had now become seen more as a ‘business card’ demonstrating the concept of what a company did, rather than a critical sales tool. In 2009 published results from research involving a representative group of distributor companies, which indicated the usage of hard copy catalogues was expected to fall up to 25% in 2010.

Distributor companies are experts in sourcing creative promotional products. Traditionally, to ensure that they had an effective manufacturer network, they kept themselves aware of the trade product ranges available from mailings received from manufacturers themselves and by attending trade exhibitions across the world, for example the Trade Only National Show in the UK, the Promotional Product Service Institute (PSI) show in Europe and the Promotional Products Association International (PPAI) Show in Las Vegas.

In 2004, the way the trade sourced promotional products began to change with the launch an online trade sourcing service, which united distributors with manufacturers worldwide. This service is purely for vetted trade promotional merchandise distributor companies and is not available to corporate end user companies.

By 2008 almost every distributor had a website demonstrating a range of available promotional products. Very few offer the ability to order products online mainly due to the complexities surrounding the processes to brand the promotional products required.

== Sourcing ==
In the United States, Canada, the United Kingdom, Ireland, Australia and New Zealand companies and corporations mainly purchase their merchandise through promotional merchandise distributor companies. These distributors are called "promotional consultants" or "promotional product distributors".

Promotional products by definition are custom printed with a logo, company name, or message usually in specific PMS colors. Distributors help end-users gather artwork in the correct format, and in some cases also create artwork for end-users. Distributors then send the artwork to the manufacturers, printers, or suppliers along with instructions on where and how to print the logo.

Many distributors operate on the internet and/or in person. Many suppliers wish not to invest in the staffing to service end-users' needs, which is the purpose of merchandise distributor companies.

== Products and uses ==
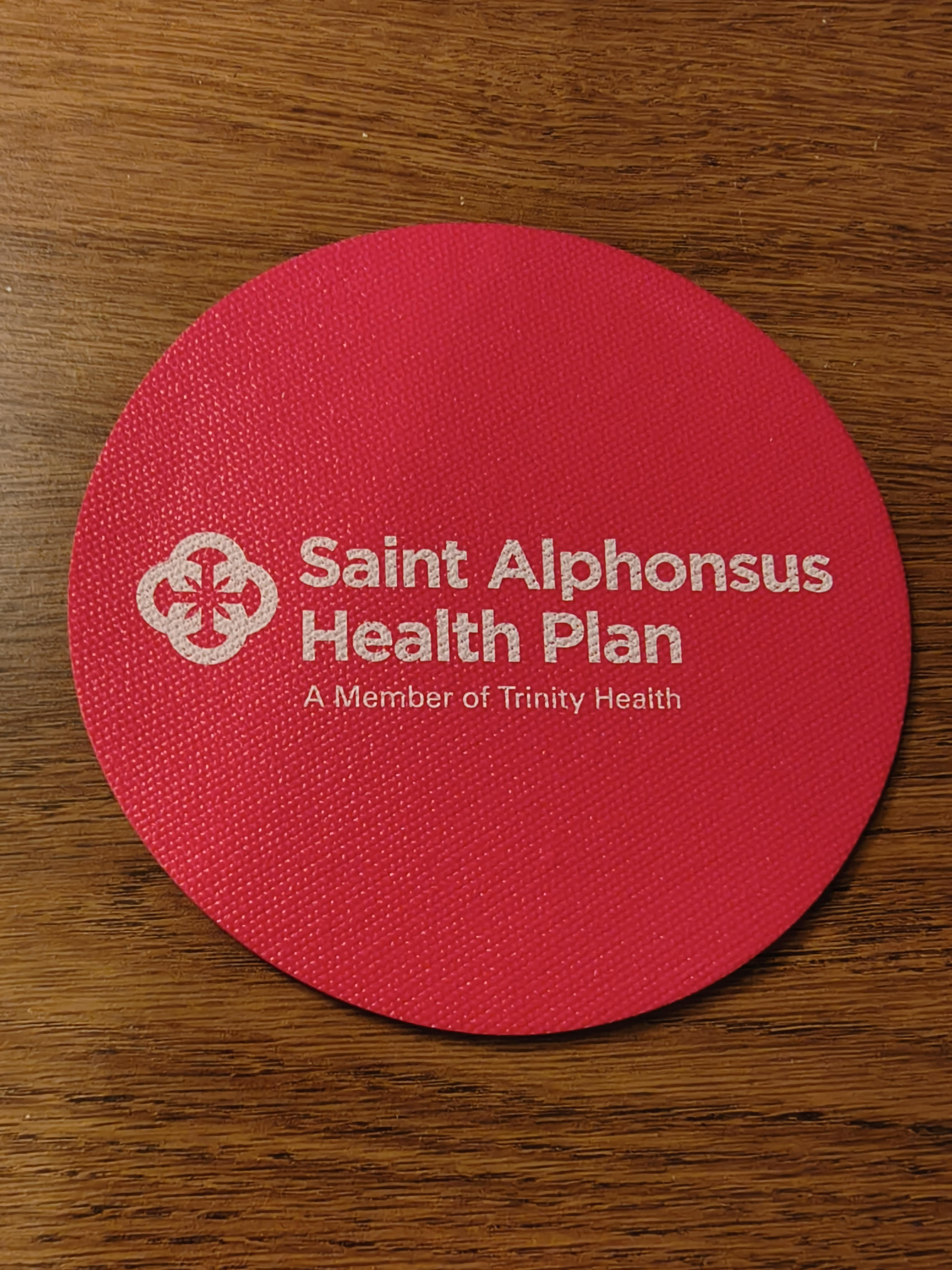
Jar opener for a non-profit Catholic hospital during the Medicare Advantage open enrollment beginning October 2025

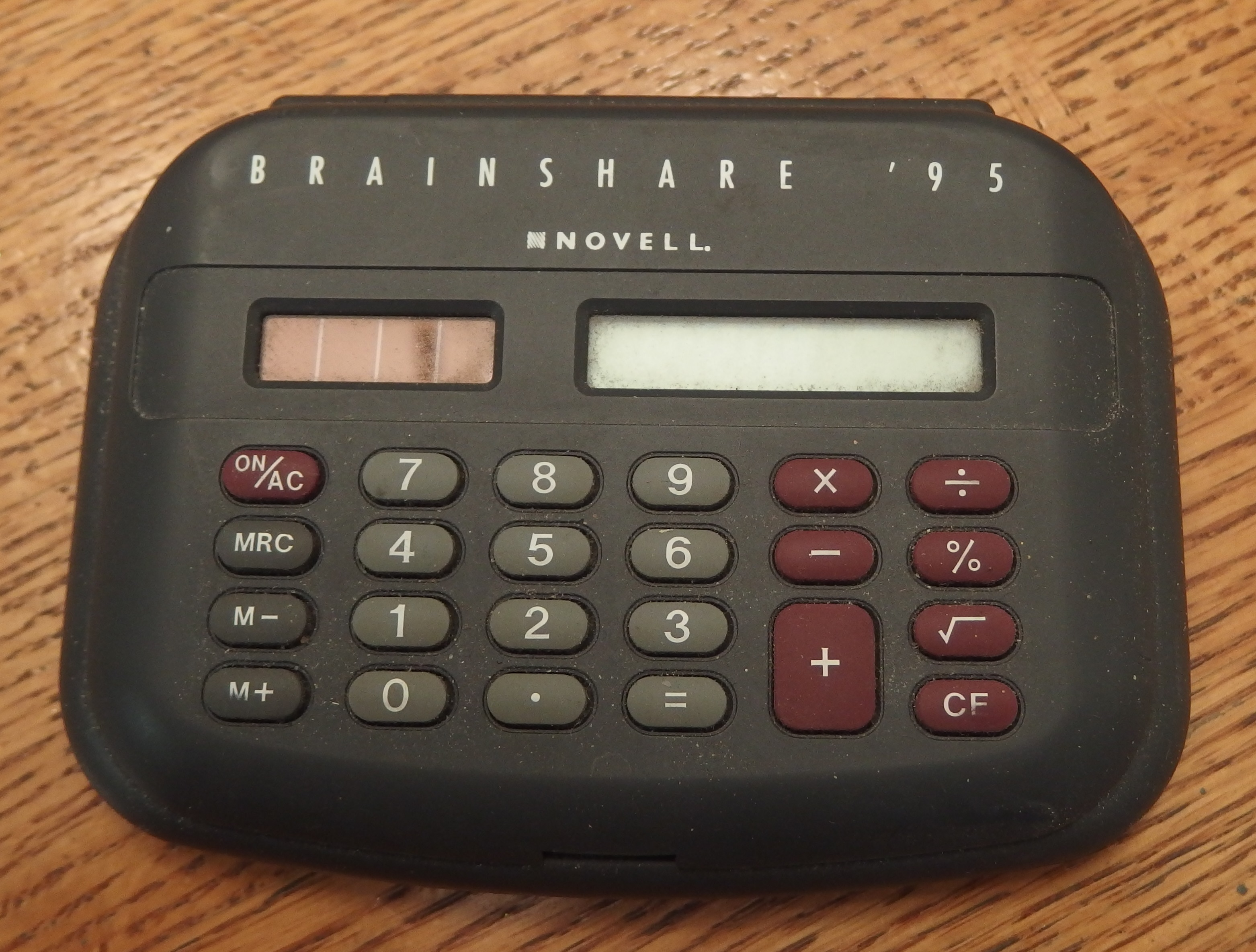
Calculator,Novell BrainShare computer conference, 1995

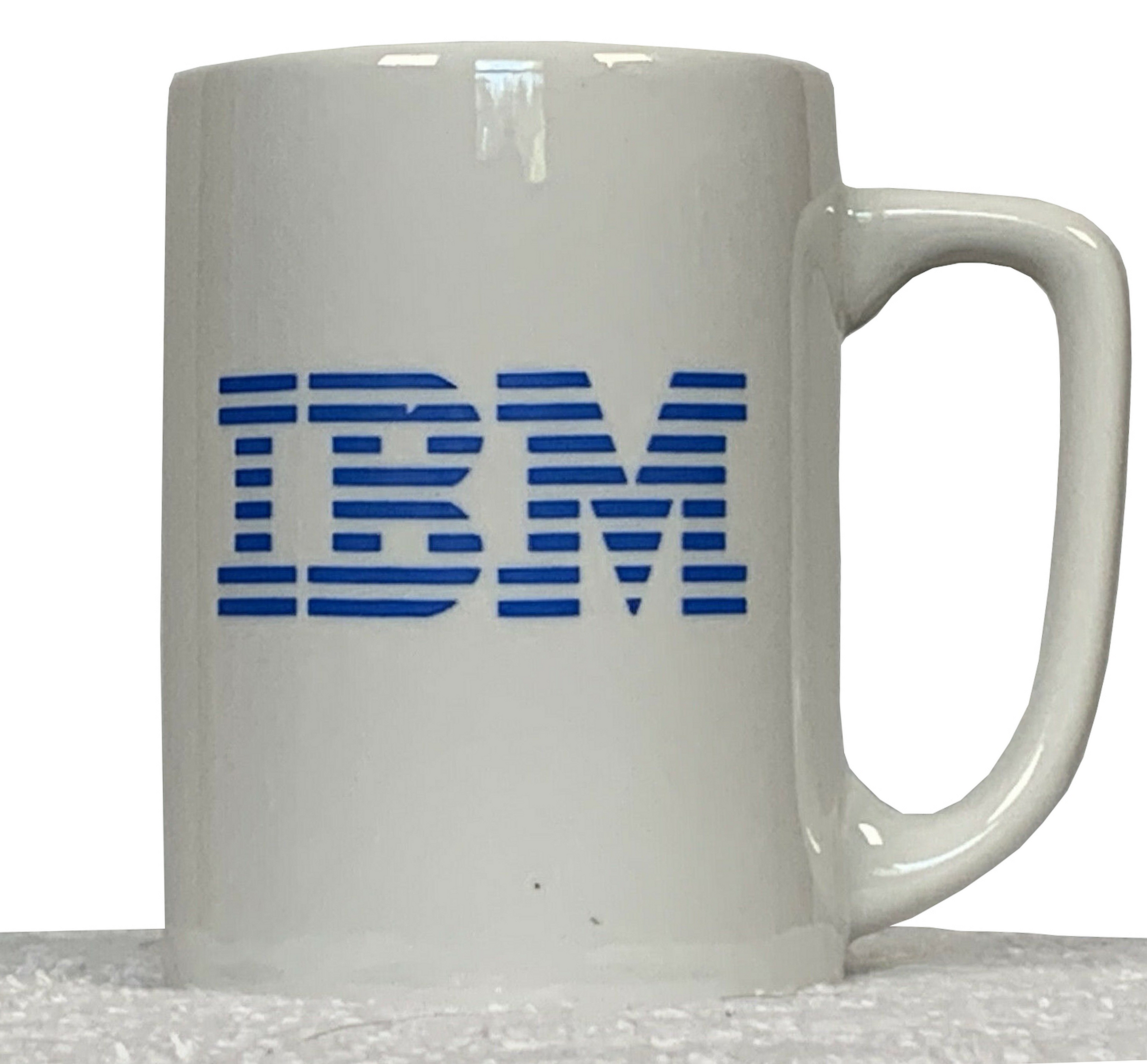
A coffee mug is a classic merchandising article employed by a broad range of entities from very small businesses up to multinational corporations like IBM; they are also frequently used by musical groups.

Promotional merchandise is used globally to promote brands, products, and corporate identity. They are also used as giveaways at events, such as exhibitions and product launches. Promotional products can be used for non-profit organizations to promote their cause, as well as promote certain events that they hold, such as walks or any other event that raises money for a cause.

Almost anything can be branded with a company's name or logo and used for promotion. Common utilitarian items include T-shirts, caps, keychains, posters, bumper stickers, pens, mugs, koozies, toys or mouse pads. The largest product category for promotional products is wearable items, which make up more than 30% of the total. Eco-friendly promotional products such as those created from recycled materials and renewable resources have been experiencing a significant surge in popularity.

Most promotional items are relatively small and inexpensive, but can range to higher-end items; for example celebrities at film festivals and award shows are often given expensive promotional items such as expensive perfumes, leather goods, and electronics items. Companies that provide expensive gifts for celebrity attendees often ask that the celebrities allow a photo to be taken of them with the gift item, which can be used by the company for promotional purposes. Other companies provide luxury gifts such as handbags or scarves to celebrity attendees in the hopes that the celebrities will wear these items in public, thus garnering publicity for the company's brand name and product.

Brand awareness is the most common use for promotional items. Other objectives that marketers use promotional items to facilitate include employee relations and events, tradeshow traffic-building, public relations, new customer generation, dealer and distributor programs, new product introductions, employee service awards, not-for-profit programs, internal incentive programs, safety education, customer referrals, and marketing research.

Promotional items are also used in politics to promote candidates and causes. Promotional items as a tool for non-commercial organizations, such as schools and charities are often used as a part of fund raising and awareness-raising campaigns. A prominent example was the Livestrong wristband, used to promote cancer awareness and raise funds to support cancer survivorship programs and research.

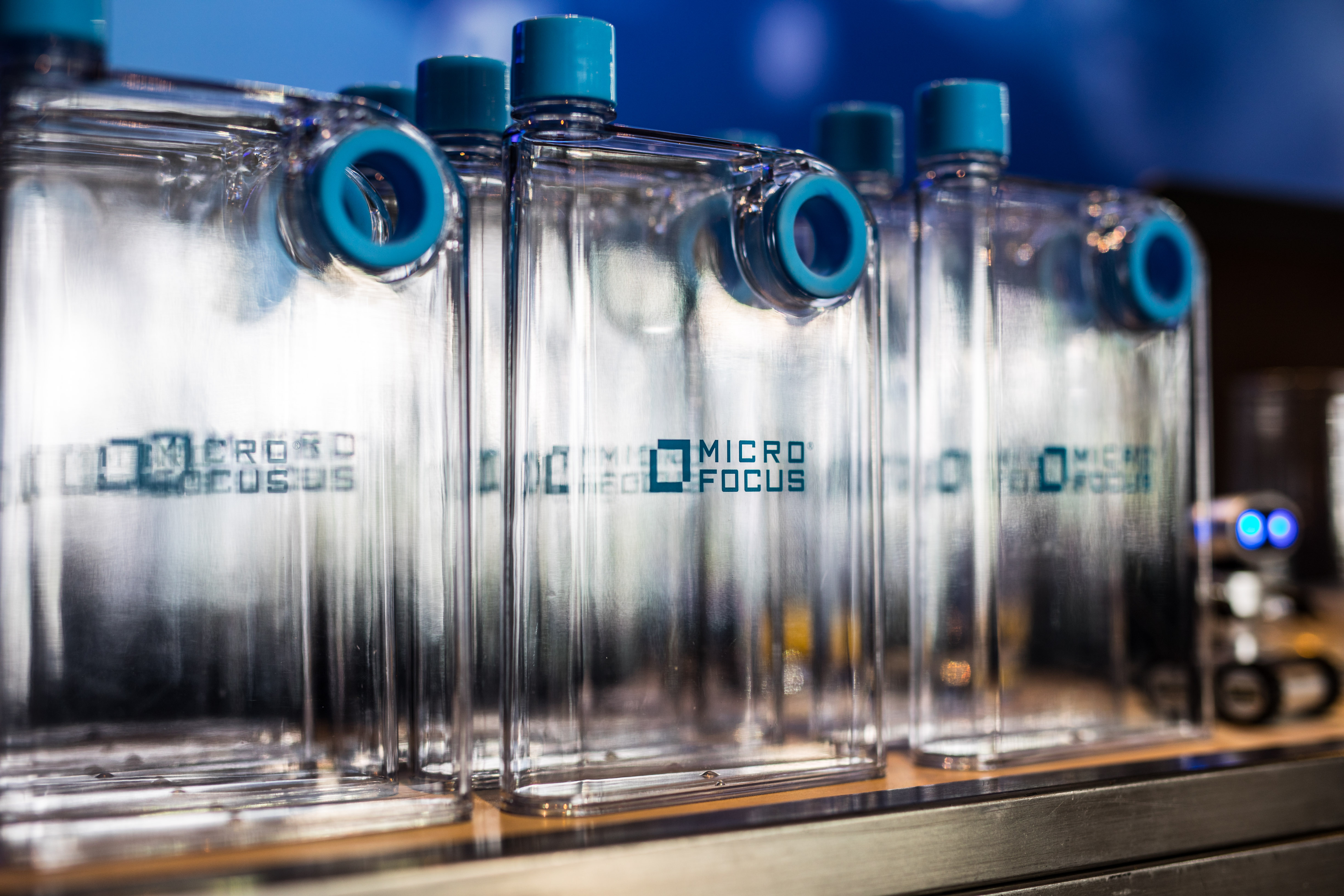
Unusual water bottle-like promotional item showcased by Micro Focus at their exhibitor booth during a 2017 conference

Using promotional merchandise in guerrilla marketing involves branding in such a way as to create a specific visual effect, attracting more attention.

The giving of corporate gifts vary across international borders and cultures, with the type of product given often varying from country to country.

Promotional merchandise is rarely bought directly by corporate companies from the actual manufacturers of promotional products. A manufacturer's expertise lies in the physical production of the products, but getting a product in front of potential customers is a completely different skill set and a complex process. Within the UK and Ireland, the promotional merchandise industry a comprehensive network of promotional merchandise distributor companies exist. A promotional merchandise distributor is defined as a company who "has a dedicated focus to the sale of promotional merchandise to end-users". (An 'end-user' is a corporate company or organization that purchases promotional merchandise for their own use.) These distributor companies have the expertise to not only take the product to market but are also to provide the expert support required. The unique aspect of promotional merchandise is that on most occasions the product is printed with the logo, or brand, of a corporate organization. The actual manufacturers rarely have the set up to actually print the item. Promotional merchandise distributor companies are experts in artwork and printing processes. In addition to this, the promotional merchandise distributors also provide full support in processing orders, artwork, proofing, progress chasing and delivery of promotional products from multiple manufacturing sources.

== Trade associations ==
In the UK, the industry has two main trade bodies, Promota (Promotional Merchandise Trade Association) founded in 1958, and the BPMA (British Promotional Merchandise Association) established in 1965. These trade associations represent the industry and provide services to both manufacturers and distributors of promotional merchandise. The BPMA provides a range of services including market research into the UK promotional merchandise industry. Since 2010 the BPMA has partnered with Trade Only, A UK company that organizes the primary UK Trade Show for the Promotional Product Industry, this takes place at the Ricoh Arena in Coventry usually the third week of January. The BPMA host an awards dinner and banquet on the middle night of the exhibition which is called the Trade Only National Show.

In the United States, PPAI (the Promotional Products Association International) is the not for profit association, offering the industry's largest tradeshow (The PPAI Expo), as well as training, online member resources, and legal advocacy. Another organization, the Advertising Specialty Institute, promotes itself as the largest media and marketing organization serving the advertising specialty industry.

In Europe, the existing EPPA will be replaced by a new organization setup by the key countries welcoming all other countries to join. The new umbrella organization will be called EPMO or PME (Product Media Europe).

== Market statistics ==
=== United Kingdom ===
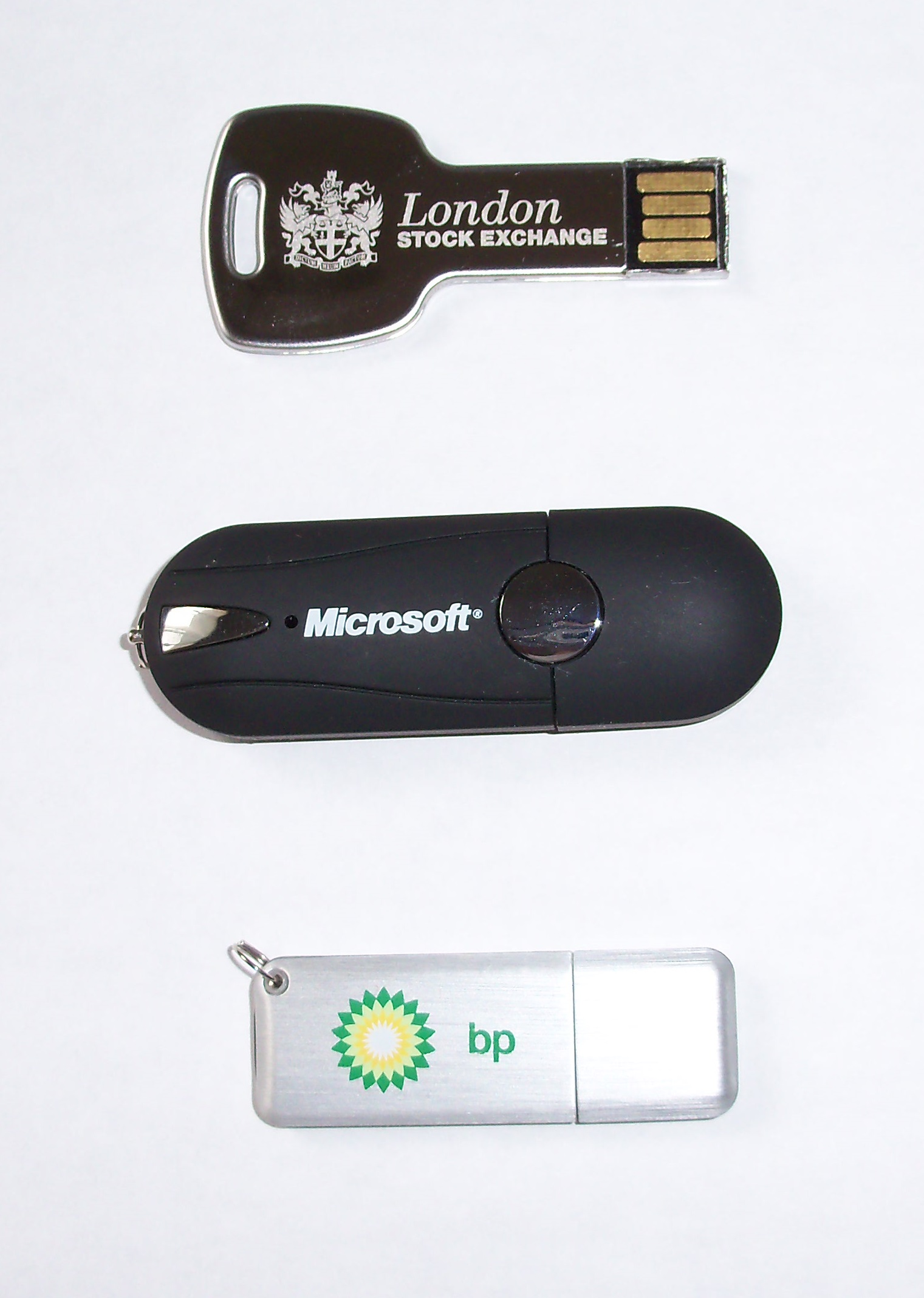
Promotional USB flash drives

According to research published by IBISWorld in 2025, the United Kingdom's promotional merchandise industry reached an estimated £1.2 billion in annual revenue, supported by steady growth at a compound annual rate of 2.8% over the previous five years. The sector employs approximately 25,000 people across more than 2,400 businesses nationwide. Industry growth has been driven by increased promotional activity linked to major sporting events and rising demand for unique, high-quality branded products. Price competitiveness remains a key factor, while the continued expansion of online platforms and e-marketing services is expected to further shape the market and attract new business clients in the coming years.

=== United States ===
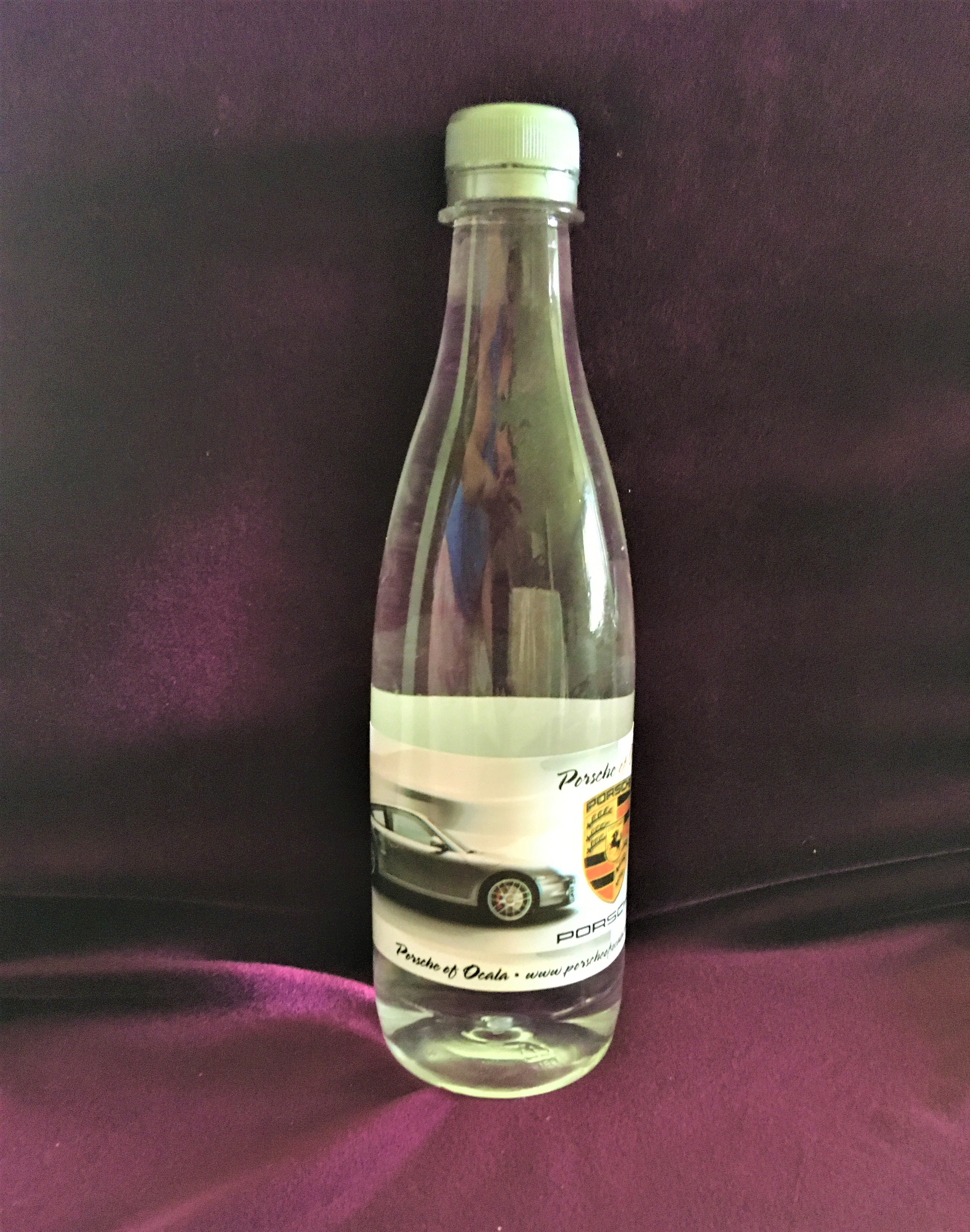
A promotional bottle of water from Porsche of Ocala in Ocala, Florida

In 2024, the U.S. promotional products industry experienced steady growth, with total distributor sales increasing by 2.63% to reach USD 26.78 billion, according to the Promotional Products Association International (PPAI). Online sales accounted for 25.5% of total revenue (USD 6.83 billion), representing a 35.85% increase as distributors expanded digital platform usage. Sustainable products comprised 13.77% of total sales (USD 3.69 billion), up 20% from the previous year, reflecting increased demand for environmentally and ethically sourced merchandise. Distributors also diversified sourcing strategies, with USD 4.3 billion (16% of total sales) attributed to non-industry providers, while apparel and drinkware remained leading product categories. Education, business services, and construction were identified as the top purchasing sectors.

Looking ahead to 2025, 65% of distributors surveyed anticipated continued sales growth, supported by ongoing digital expansion, sustainability initiatives, and sourcing diversification amid broader economic uncertainty.

The most common promotional items include T-shirts (25% of the market), writing instruments, tech accessories, bags, keychains, brochures, bookmarks and notebooks.

=== Australia and New Zealand ===
Australasia's promotional merchandise sector is represented by the Australasian Promotional Products Association (APPA), the regional trade body for suppliers and distributors. Industry research indicates that branded, tangible products are widely regarded as effective, low-cost advertising tools. Studies report that 82% of consumers respond positively to companies that provide promotional products; 80% have an immediate reaction when receiving an item from a previously unknown brand; and 75% would prefer to receive a promotional product over other forms of advertising. Consumers are reported to be 2.5 times more likely to hold a positive opinion of a brand after receiving a promotional product compared with online advertising, 79% subsequently research the company, and 95% of recipients of promotional apparel can recall the advertiser’s name. Longevity is also cited as a factor, with 81% retaining promotional products for more than one year, office workers keeping items for over two years on average, and 70% indicating they would like to receive promotional products more frequently.

According to Cognitive Market Research, the promotional products market has an estimated annual turnover of AUD $1.071 billion in Australia and NZD $144 million in New Zealand.

== See also ==
- Promotion (marketing)
- Loyalty marketing
- Loss leader
- Showbag
