= Advertising Specialty Institute =

U.S. industry association

Advertising Specialty Institute (ASI)
- Type: Privately held company
- Headquarters: Trevose, Pennsylvania, United States
- Key people: ASI Co-Chairs Matthew Cohn and Stephanie Schaeffer; ASI CEO Ashish Mittal
- Website: ASICentral.com

The Advertising Specialty Institute (ASI) is a privately held technology, media, and membership organization headquartered in Trevose, Pennsylvania. It serves as the largest trade membership organization in the promotional products industry — a sector comprising businesses that produce and distribute branded merchandise such as logoed apparel, drinkware, pens, bags, and other items used for marketing and brand promotion.

ASI serves a network of tens of thousands of suppliers, distributors, and decorators operating within what it describes as the promotional products industry. The promotional products industry reached a record $27.7B in 2025 North American sales – a 4.2% increase from the previous year.

In addition to its cataloging service, ASI publishes magazines and informational literature for the promotional products industry and also holds conventions each year. The "ASI Show" is held in a few major U.S. cities throughout the year, and features a keynote address by a well-known marketer, celebrity, or other well-known figure.

== Products and services ==
ASI's core offering is ESP+, an electronic product-sourcing platform used by promotional-products suppliers and distributors. The platform allows distributors to search supplier product listings, place orders, create client-facing websites and manage business operations.

In addition to ESP+, ASI offers:

- ESP+ Websites — e-commerce-enabled, customizable websites for distributors to sell promotional products directly to end-buyers
- Catalogs — print and digital product catalogs distributors can share with clients
- Research and data — including the annual Counselor State of the Industry report, the Counselor Power 50 ranking of industry leaders, and the Counselor Confidence Index measuring distributor financial outlook
- Education — webinars, online courses, and industry training resources
- Trade shows — the ASI Show, held annually in Orlando, Fort Worth, and Chicago, brings suppliers and distributors together to showcase new products and build business relationships

== Industry Role ==
ASI functions as the connective infrastructure of the promotional products supply chain. Suppliers — companies that manufacture or source branded merchandise — use ASI to list their products and reach distributors. Distributors — companies that sell promotional products to end-buyer clients such as corporations, nonprofits, schools, and government agencies — use ASI's tools to source products, manage orders, and market their services. ASI is widely described as the world's largest membership organization serving the promotional products industry.

Promotional products themselves, also called swag specialties, are physical items imprinted with a company's name, logo, or message and distributed for marketing, employee recognition, event giveaways, or customer retention purposes. Publications ASI publishes the major industry trade magazine:

- Counselor Magazine — the flagship publication covering the promotional products industry broadly, including sales data, rankings, and business trends

Previous publications include:

- Advantages — targeted at promotional product salespeople and distributors
- Stitches — focused on the custom embroidery segment
- Wearables — covering the branded apparel sector

== History ==
Before ASI, there was no paper-based resource for finding promotional products or their suppliers. Small salespeople relied on separate paper catalogs from individuals from each individual supplier.

In 1949, Maurice and Bess Cohn of Iowa entered the industry as distributors, or sellers, of promo items. Four years later, they decided to become food gift suppliers instead, growing into the industry's largest. In 1962, their 29-year-old son Norman encouraged them to buy ASI.

The Cohns soon sold their supplier business to focus on ASI and unifying the distributor and supplier network. Norman and his wife Suzanne relocated their family to Philadelphia to run the company and all five of their children, as they became old enough, worked at ASI, contributing to the success of the company and industry.

The company is currently led by CEO Ashish Mittal and ASI Co-Chairs Matthew Cohn and Stephanie Schaeffer, members of the third generation.

== Other ASI features ==
=== ASI Show ===
Started in 1998, the ASI show is one of the many annual industry trade shows that brings suppliers and distributors together to showcase the latest promotional products of the year. ASI also brings in keynote speakers and holds workshops and seminars for ASI members. ASI Shows are held in Orlando, Fort Worth and Chicago.
